= Santiago de Aller CF =

Spanish football club

Santiago de Aller
- Full name: Santiago de Aller Club de Fútbol
- Founded: 2 July 1952; 73 years ago (as Santiago de Caborana)
- Ground: Campo Federico Mulas, Morea, Asturias, Spain
- Capacity: 700
- President: Guillermo Agustiño
- League: Tercera Asturfútbol – Group 3
Home colours	Away colours

Santiago de Aller Club de Fútbol is a Spanish football club based in Morea, Aller, Asturias. Founded in 1952, they play in Tercera Asturfútbol – Group 3, holding home matches at the Campo Federico Mulas.

== Season to season ==
Season	Tier	Division	Place	Copa del Rey
1952–53	5	2ª Reg.	1st	
1953–54	5	2ª Reg.	1st	
1954–55	4	1ª Reg.	7th	
1955–56	4	1ª Reg.	3rd	
1956–57	4	1ª Reg.	6th	
1957–58	4	1ª Reg.	1st	
1958–59	3	3ª	5th	
1959–60	3	3ª	7th	
1960–61	3	3ª	10th	
1961–62	3	3ª	10th	
1962–63	3	3ª	10th	
1963–64	3	3ª	12th	
1964–65	3	3ª	15th	
1965–66	4	1ª Reg.	9th	
1966–67	4	1ª Reg.	14th	
1967–68	4	1ª Reg.	16th	
1968–69	5	2ª Reg.	8th	
1969–70	5	2ª Reg.	10th	
1970–71	5	2ª Reg.	6th	
1971–72	5	2ª Reg.	14th	

Season	Tier	Division	Place	Copa del Rey
1972–73	5	2ª Reg.	5th	
1973–74	6	2ª Reg.	12th	
1974–75	6	2ª Reg.	9th	
1975–76	6	2ª Reg.	7th	
1976–77	6	2ª Reg.	10th	
1977–78	7	2ª Reg.	1st	
1978–79	6	1ª Reg.	8th	
1979–80	6	1ª Reg.	10th	
1980–81	6	1ª Reg.	(R)	
1981–82	DNP			
1982–83	7	2ª Reg.	14th	
1983–84	7	2ª Reg.	10th	
1984–85	7	2ª Reg.	4th	
1985–86	7	2ª Reg.	1st	
1986–87	6	1ª Reg.	1st	
1987–88	5	Reg. Pref.	6th	
1988–89	5	Reg. Pref.	2nd	
1989–90	4	3ª	16th	
1990–91	4	3ª	7th	
1991–92	4	3ª	13th	

Season	Tier	Division	Place	Copa del Rey
1992–93	4	3ª	6th	
1993–94	4	3ª	13th	First round
1994–95	4	3ª	20th	
1995–96	5	Reg. Pref.	1st	
1996–97	4	3ª	18th	
1997–98	5	Reg. Pref.	13th	
1998–99	5	Reg. Pref.	5th	
1999–2000	5	Reg. Pref.	8th	
2000–01	5	Reg. Pref.	17th	
2001–02	5	Reg. Pref.	20th	
2002–03	6	1ª Reg.	6th	
2003–04	6	1ª Reg.	15th	
2004–05	6	1ª Reg.	15th	
2005–06	6	1ª Reg.	8th	
2006–07	6	1ª Reg.	3rd	
2007–08	6	1ª Reg.	3rd	
2008–09	5	Reg. Pref.	16th	
2009–10	5	Reg. Pref.	18th	
2010–11	DNP			
2011–12	DNP			

Season	Tier	Division	Place	Copa del Rey
2012–13	DNP			
2013–14	7	2ª Reg.	3rd	
2014–15	6	1ª Reg.	15th	
2015–16	6	1ª Reg.	18th	
2016–17	7	2ª Reg.	8th	
2017–18	7	2ª Reg.	9th	
2018–19	7	2ª Reg.	8th	
2019–20	7	2ª Reg.	10th	
2020–21	7	2ª Reg.	5th	
2021–2025	DNP			
2025–26	8	3ª Astur.		

- 14 seasons in Tercera División
