= CD Juventud del Círculo Católico =

Juventud del Círculo
- Full name: Club Deportivo Juventud del Círculo Católico
- Nickname: Juve
- Founded: 14 April 1928; 98 years ago
- Ground: José Manuel Sedano, Burgos, Castile and León, Spain
- Capacity: 1,000
- President: Víctor Manuel González
- Manager: Javier Lara
- League: Primera Provincial – Burgos
- 2025–26: Primera Provincial – Burgos, 5th of 13
- Website: https://www.juventudcirculo.com
Home colours	Away colours

Club Deportivo Juventud del Círculo Católico is a Spanish football team based in Burgos, in the autonomous community of Castile and León. Founded in 1928, they play in Primera Provincial – Burgos, holding home games at Campo de Fútbol José Manuel Sedano, with a capacity of 1,000 people.

== Season to season ==
Season	Tier	Division	Place	Copa del Rey
1928–1948	—	Regional	—	
1948–49	4	1ª Reg.	4th	
1949–50	5	2ª Reg.	3rd	
1950–51	4	1ª Reg.		
1951–52	4	1ª Reg.		
1952–53	4	1ª Reg.		
1953–54	4	1ª Reg.	5th	
1954–55	4	1ª Reg.	2nd	
1955–56	4	1ª Reg.	1st	
1956–57	3	3ª	6th	
1957–58	3	3ª	13th	
1958–59	3	3ª	14th	
1959–60	3	3ª	11th	
1960–61	3	3ª	6th	
1961–62	3	3ª	10th	
1962–63	3	3ª	7th	
1963–64	3	3ª	7th	
1964–65	3	3ª	5th	
1965–66	3	3ª	9th	
1966–67	3	3ª	7th	

Season	Tier	Division	Place	Copa del Rey
1967–68	3	3ª	13th	
1968–69	4	1ª Reg.	2nd	
1969–70	4	1ª Reg.	1st	
1970–71	4	Reg. Pref.	11th	
1971–72	4	Reg. Pref.	15th	
1972–73	5	1ª Reg.	4th	
1973–74	5	1ª Reg.	7th	
1974–75	5	1ª Reg.	12th	
1975–76	5	1ª Reg.	10th	
1976–77	5	1ª Reg.	4th	
1977–78	6	1ª Reg.	2nd	
1978–79	6	1ª Reg.	1st	
1979–1989	DNP			
1989–90	6	1ª Reg.	3rd	
1990–91	5	Reg. Pref.	15th	
1991–92	5	Reg. Pref.	8th	
1992–93	6	1ª Reg.	5th	
1993–94	6	1ª Reg.	8th	
1994–95	6	1ª Reg.	11th	
1995–96	6	1ª Reg.	3rd	

Season	Tier	Division	Place	Copa del Rey
1996–97	5	Reg. Pref.	15th	
1997–98	6	1ª Reg.	8th	
1998–99	6	1ª Reg.	12th	
1999–2000	6	1ª Prov.	11th	
2000–01	6	1ª Prov.	11th	
2001–02	6	1ª Prov.	16th	
2002–03	6	1ª Prov.	12th	
2003–04	6	1ª Prov.	9th	
2004–05	6	1ª Prov.	13th	
2005–06	6	1ª Prov.	10th	
2006–07	6	1ª Prov.	7th	
2007–08	6	1ª Prov.	6th	
2008–09	6	1ª Prov.	10th	
2009–10	6	1ª Prov.	4th	
2010–11	6	1ª Prov.	3rd	
2011–12	6	1ª Prov.	1st	
2012–13	5	1ª Reg.	13th	
2013–14	5	1ª Reg.	13th	
2014–15	5	1ª Reg.	14th	
2015–2021	DNP			

Season	Tier	Division	Place	Copa del Rey
2021–22	7	1ª Prov.	3rd	
2022–23	7	1ª Prov.	5th	
2023–24	7	1ª Prov.	2nd	
2024–25	7	1ª Prov.	4th	
2025–26	7	1ª Prov.	5th	
2026–27	7	1ª Prov.		

- 12 seasons in Tercera División
