= Mequinenza CD =

Association football club in Spain

Mequinenza
- Full name: Mequinenza Club Deportivo
- Founded: 1922
- Ground: Las Rías, Mequinenza, Aragon, Spain
- Capacity: 2,000
- President: Francisco José Montull
- Head coach: Édgar Baños
- League: Primera Regional – Group 2
- 2025–26: Primera Regional – Group 2, 10th of 18
Home colours	Away colours

Mequinenza Club Deportivo is a Spanish football team based in Mequinenza, in the autonomous community of Aragon. Founded in 1922, they play in Primera Regional – Group 2, holding home games at Campo Municipal de Fútbol Las Rías, with a capacity of 2,000 people.

== Season to season ==
Season	Tier	Division	Place	Copa del Rey
1929–1944	—	Regional	—	
1944–45	4	1ª Reg.	3rd	
1945–46	4	1ª Reg.	3rd	
1946–47	3	3ª	7th	
1947–48	4	1ª Reg.	1st	
1948–49	4	1ª Reg.	1st	
1949–50	4	1ª Reg.	5th	
1950–51	4	1ª Reg.	1st	
1951–52	DNP			
1952–53	DNP			
1953–54	5	2ª Reg.	1st	
1954–55	4	1ª Reg.	4th	
1955–56	4	1ª Reg.	5th	
1956–57	3	3ª	15th	
1957–58	3	3ª	11th	
1958–59	3	3ª	9th	
1959–60	3	3ª	14th	
1960–61	3	3ª	8th	
1961–62	3	3ª	14th	
1962–63	3	3ª	9th	

Season	Tier	Division	Place	Copa del Rey
1963–64	3	3ª	8th	
1964–65	3	3ª	8th	
1965–66	3	3ª	12th	
1966–67	3	3ª	9th	
1967–68	3	3ª	9th	
1968–69	4	Reg. Pref.	8th	
1969–70	4	Reg. Pref.	17th	
1970–71	5	1ª Reg.	4th	
1971–72	4	Reg. Pref.	3rd	
1972–73	4	Reg. Pref.	13th	
1973–74	4	Reg. Pref.	6th	
1974–75	4	Reg. Pref.	20th	
1975–76	5	1ª Reg.	13th	
1976–77	5	1ª Reg.	8th	
1977–78	6	1ª Reg.	1st	
1978–79	5	Reg. Pref.	14th	
1979–80	5	Reg. Pref.	14th	
1980–81	5	Reg. Pref.	10th	
1981–82	5	Reg. Pref.	13th	
1982–83	5	Reg. Pref.	15th	

Season	Tier	Division	Place	Copa del Rey
1983–84	5	Reg. Pref.	17th	
1984–85	5	Reg. Pref.	7th	
1985–86	5	Reg. Pref.	4th	
1986–87	4	3ª	16th	
1987–88	4	3ª	19th	
1988–89	5	Reg. Pref.	7th	
1989–90	5	Reg. Pref.	3rd	
1990–91	5	Reg. Pref.	3rd	
1991–92	5	Reg. Pref.	5th	
1992–93	5	Reg. Pref.	18th	
1993–94	6	1ª Reg.	2nd	
1994–95	5	Reg. Pref.	16th	
1995–96	6	1ª Reg.	5th	
1996–97	6	1ª Reg.	5th	
1997–98	5	Reg. Pref.	16th	
1998–99	6	1ª Reg.	1st	
1999–2000	5	Reg. Pref.	9th	
2000–01	5	Reg. Pref.	6th	
2001–02	5	Reg. Pref.	6th	
2002–03	5	Reg. Pref.	15th	

Season	Tier	Division	Place	Copa del Rey
2003–04	6	1ª Reg.	2nd	
2004–05	5	Reg. Pref.	10th	
2005–06	5	Reg. Pref.	10th	
2006–07	5	Reg. Pref.	8th	
2007–08	5	Reg. Pref.	15th	
2008–09	6	1ª Reg.	9th	
2009–10	6	1ª Reg.	12th	
2010–11	6	1ª Reg.	5th	
2011–12	6	1ª Reg.	3rd	
2012–13	5	Reg. Pref.	14th	
2013–14	5	Reg. Pref.	12th	
2014–15	5	Reg. Pref.	14th	
2015–16	5	Reg. Pref.	10th	
2016–17	5	Reg. Pref.	7th	
2017–18	5	Reg. Pref.	3rd	
2018–19	5	Reg. Pref.	11th	
2019–20	5	Reg. Pref.	18th	
2020–21	5	Reg. Pref.	6th	
2021–22	6	Reg. Pref.	12th	
2022–23	7	1ª Reg.	3rd	

Season	Tier	Division	Place	Copa del Rey
2023–24	6	Reg. Pref.	16th	
2024–25	7	1ª Reg.	13th	
2025–26	7	1ª Reg.		

- 15 seasons in Tercera División
