= CD Iliturgi =

Spanish football team (1922–2007)

Iliturgi
- Full name: Club Deportivo Iliturgi
- Founded: 1922; 1994 (refounded)
- Dissolved: 2007
- Ground: Santa Úrsula; Andújar, Jaén, Andalusia, Spain
- Capacity: 1,000
- 2006–07: 1ª Andaluza – Group 3, 1st of 16
Home colours

Club Deportivo Iliturgi was a Spanish football team based in Andújar, Jaén, in the autonomous community of Andalusia. Founded in 1922 and dissolved in 2007, they played in the Tercera División for 25 seasons, and held home matches at Campo Municipal de Fútbol Santa Úrsula, with a capacity of 1,000 people.

== History ==
Founded in 1922, Iliturgi first reached the Tercera División in 1947, and played for 23 consecutive seasons in the category before folding in 1970. Four years later, a new club was founded in the city, under the name of Iliturgi CF, and played senior football for 20 years (13 of them in Tercera) before also disappearing.

In 1994, shortly after Iliturgi CF's dissolution, CD Iliturgi returned to an active status, returning to a national division in 2000. Relegated in 2002, they played for a further five campaigns before achieving promotion back to the fourth division in 2007, after winning their group in the Primera Andaluza. In September 2007, after two no-shows in the first two fixtures of the 2007–08 Tercera División, the club was dissolved.

In 2008, a new club was founded in the city under the name of CD Iliturgi CF, but they folded in 2015. One year later, Iliturgi CF 2016 was created.

== Season to season ==
Season	Tier	Division	Place	Copa del Rey
1941–1947	—	Regional	—	
1946–47	5	1ª Reg. I.	1st	
1947–48	3	3ª	6th	
1948–49	3	3ª	11th	
1949–50	3	3ª	5th	
1950–51	3	3ª	9th	
1951–52	3	3ª	2nd	
1952–53	3	3ª	10th	
1953–54	3	3ª	12th	
1954–55	3	3ª	2nd	
1955–56	3	3ª	5th	
1956–57	3	3ª	2nd	
1957–58	3	3ª	2nd	
1958–59	3	3ª	8th	
1959–60	3	3ª	5th	
1960–61	3	3ª	14th	
1961–62	3	3ª	10th	
1962–63	3	3ª	11th	
1963–64	3	3ª	13th	
1964–65	3	3ª	5th	

Season	Tier	Division	Place	Copa del Rey
1965–66	3	3ª	6th	
1966–67	3	3ª	9th	
1967–68	3	3ª	9th	
1968–69	3	3ª	16th	
1969–70	3	3ª	19th	
1970–1994	DNP			
1994–95	6	1ª Reg.	1st	
1995–96	5	Reg. Pref.	2nd	
1996–97	5	Reg. Pref.	4th	
1997–98	5	Reg. Pref.	3rd	
1998–99	5	Reg. Pref.	3rd	
1999–2000	5	Reg. Pref.	1st	
2000–01	4	3ª	16th	
2001–02	4	3ª	21st	
2002–03	5	Reg. Pref.	4th	
2003–04	5	Reg. Pref.	3rd	
2004–05	5	1ª And.	4th	
2005–06	5	1ª And.	11th	
2006–07	5	1ª And.	1st	

- 25 seasons in Tercera División
