= Arenas SD =

Association football club in Spain

Arenas
- Full name: Arenas Sociedad Deportiva
- Founded: 10 March 1927; 99 years ago
- Ground: San Gregorio, Zaragoza, Aragon, Spain
- Capacity: 1,000
- 2023–24: Tercera Regional Domingos – Group 1, 10th of 11
Home colours

Arenas Sociedad Deportiva is a Spanish football team based in San Gregorio, Zaragoza, in the autonomous community of Aragon. Founded on 10 March 1927, the club played for 27 seasons in the Tercera División.

== History ==
=== Club background ===
- Arenas Sport Club — (1927–41)
- Arenas Sociedad Deportiva — (1941–)

== Season to season ==
Season	Tier	Division	Place	Copa del Rey
1929–1933	—	Regional	—	
1933–34	3	3ª	3rd	
1934–1940	—	Regional	—	
1940–41	4	1ª Reg.	2nd	
1941–42	3	1ª Reg.	3rd	
1942–43	3	1ª Reg.	1st	
1943–44	3	3ª	2nd	
1944–45	3	3ª	1st	
1945–46	3	3ª	1st	
1946–47	3	3ª	2nd	
1947–48	3	3ª	8th	
1948–49	3	3ª	10th	Fifth round
1949–50	3	3ª	4th	
1950–51	3	3ª	10th	
1951–52	3	3ª	5th	
1952–53	3	3ª	12th	
1953–54	3	3ª	10th	
1954–55	3	3ª	1st	
1955–56	3	3ª	2nd	
1956–57	3	3ª	1st	

Season	Tier	Division	Place	Copa del Rey
1957–58	3	3ª	3rd	
1958–59	3	3ª	2nd	
1959–60	3	3ª	2nd	
1960–61	3	3ª	2nd	
1961–62	3	3ª	10th	
1962–63	3	3ª	14th	
1963–64	3	3ª	13th	
1964–65	3	3ª	10th	
1965–66	3	3ª	9th	
1966–67	3	3ª	7th	
1967–68	3	3ª	10th	
1968–69	3	3ª	20th	
1969–70	4	Reg. Pref.	6th	
1970–71	4	Reg. Pref.	9th	
1971–72	4	Reg. Pref.	20th	
1972–73	5	1ª Reg.	11th	
1973–74	5	1ª Reg.	20th	
1974–75	6	2ª Reg.	4th	
1975–76	5	1ª Reg.	17th	
1976–77	6	2ª Reg.	2nd	

Season	Tier	Division	Place	Copa del Rey
1977–78	6	1ª Reg.	3rd	
1978–79	6	1ª Reg.	2nd	
1979–80	5	Reg. Pref.	12th	
1980–81	5	Reg. Pref.	13th	
1981–82	5	Reg. Pref.	10th	
1982–83	5	Reg. Pref.	12th	
1983–84	5	Reg. Pref.	19th	
1984–85	6	1ª Reg.	8th	
1985–86	6	1ª Reg.	9th	
1986–87	6	1ª Reg.	15th	
1987–88	7	2ª Reg.	5th	
1988–89	7	2ª Reg.	5th	
1989–90	DNP			
1990–91	DNP			
1991–92	6	1ª Reg.	9th	
1992–93	6	1ª Reg.	16th	
1993–94	7	2ª Reg.	1st	
1994–95	6	1ª Reg.	8th	
1995–96	6	1ª Reg.	7th	
1996–97	6	1ª Reg.	2nd	

Season	Tier	Division	Place	Copa del Rey
1997–98	5	Reg. Pref.	13th	
1998–99	5	Reg. Pref.	15th	
1999–2000	6	1ª Reg.	14th	
2000–01	6	1ª Reg.	14th	
2001–02	6	1ª Reg.	17th	
2002–03	7	2ª Reg.	1st	
2003–04	6	1ª Reg.	2nd	
2004–05	5	Reg. Pref.	15th	
2005–06	6	1ª Reg.	15th	
2006–07	6	1ª Reg.	8th	
2007–08	6	1ª Reg.	16th	
2008–09	7	2ª Reg.	2nd	
2009–10	6	1ª Reg.	18th	
2010–11	7	2ª Reg.	5th	
2011–12	6	1ª Reg.	5th	
2012–13	6	1ª Reg.	6th	
2013–14	6	1ª Reg.	17th	
2014–15	7	2ª Reg.	14th	
2015–16	7	2ª Reg.	16th	
2016–17	8	2ª Reg. B	18th	

Season	Tier	Division	Place	Copa del Rey
2017–18	DNP			
2018–19	9	3ª Reg.	11th	
2019–20	9	3ª Reg.	9th	
2020–21	9	3ª Reg.	(R)	
2021–22	DNP			
2022–23	DNP			
2023–24	10	3ª Reg.	10th	

- 27 seasons in Tercera División
