= Club Imperio de Ceuta SD =

Multi-sports club in Spain

Imperio de Ceuta
- Full name: Club Imperio de Ceuta Sociedad Deportiva
- Founded: 1958
- Ground: José Martínez Pirri
- Capacity: 1,500
Home colours

Club Imperio de Ceuta Sociedad Deportiva is a Spanish multi-sports club based in the autonomous city of Ceuta. Founded in 1958, their football team plays holds home games at Estadio José Martínez Pirri, with a capacity of 1,500 people.

== History ==
Founded in 1958 after the merger of Club Imperio Riffien (founded in 1942) and Hércules CF (founded in 1941) under the name of Club Deportivo Riffien Jadú, the club immediately started playing in Tercera División. They remained in the category until 1967, and went on to feature a single season there in the 1970s and a further five in the 1980s before only playing in the regional leagues.

=== Club background ===
Imperio Riffien

- Club Imperio Jadú (1942–1947)
- Club Imperio Riffien (1947–1954; 1957–1958)
- Club Riffien Castillejos (1954–1957)

Hércules

- Club de Fútbol Betis Jadú (1941–1944)
- Sociedad Deportiva Jadú (1944–1957)
- Hércules Club de Fútbol (1957–1958)

Imperio de Ceuta

- Club Deportivo Riffien Jadú (1958–1964)
- Club Imperio de Ceuta Sociedad Deportiva (1964–present)

==== Other clubs from Ceuta ====
- Agrupación Deportiva Ceuta — (1969–91)
- Club Ceutí Atlético – (1996–97)
- Asociación Deportiva Ceuta (1997–2012)
- Agrupación Deportiva Ceuta Fútbol Club (2013–)

== Season to season ==
=== Imperio Riffien ===
Season	Tier	Division	Place	Copa del Rey
1942–1956	4	1ª Reg.		
1956–57	3	3ª	6th	
1957–58	3	3ª	15th	

- 2 seasons in Tercera División

=== Hércules ===
Season	Tier	Division	Place	Copa del Rey
1941–1957	4	1ª Reg.		
1957–58	3	3ª	18th	

- 1 season in Tercera División

=== Imperio de Ceuta ===
Season	Tier	Division	Place	Copa del Rey
1958–59	3	3ª	9th	
1959–60	3	3ª	12th	
1960–61	3	3ª	14th	
1961–62	3	3ª	12th	
1962–63	3	3ª	14th	
1963–64	3	3ª	14th	
1964–65	3	3ª	13th	
1965–66	3	3ª	13th	
1966–67	3	3ª	16th	
1967–68	4	1ª Reg.	2nd	
1968–69	4	1ª Reg.	3rd	
1969–70	4	1ª Reg.	2nd	
1970–71	4	1ª Reg.	4th	
1971–72	4	1ª Reg.	3rd	
1972–73	4	1ª Reg.	1st	
1973–74	4	1ª Reg.	3rd	
1974–75	4	Reg. Pref.	1st	
1975–76	3	3ª	20th	First round
1976–77	4	Reg. Pref.	4th	
1977–78	5	Reg. Pref.	2nd	

Season	Tier	Division	Place	Copa del Rey
1978–79	5	Reg. Pref.	5th	
1979–80	5	Reg. Pref.	2nd	
1980–81	5	Reg. Pref.	1st	
1981–82	4	3ª	20th	
1982–83	5	Reg. Pref.	1st	
1983–84	4	3ª	7th	
1984–85	4	3ª	12th	
1985–86	4	3ª	19th	
1986–87	5	Reg. Pref.	1st	
1987–88	4	3ª	21st	
1988–89	5	Reg. Pref.	3rd	
1989–90	5	Reg. Pref.	8th	
1990–91	5	Reg. Pref.	6th	
1991–92	5	Reg. Pref.	5th	
1992–93	5	Reg. Pref.	9th	
1993–94	5	Reg. Pref.	5th	
1994–95	5	Reg. Pref.	2nd	
1995–96	5	Reg. Pref.	6th	
1996–97	5	Reg. Pref.	4th	
1997–98	5	Reg. Pref.	(R)	

Season	Tier	Division	Place	Copa del Rey
1998–2004	DNP			
2004–05	5	Reg. Pref.	10th	
2005–06	5	Reg. Pref.	13th	
2006–07	5	Reg. Pref.	3rd	
2007–08	5	Reg. Pref.	7th	
2008–2012	DNP			
2012–13	5	Reg. Pref.	7th	
2013–14	5	Reg. Pref.	11th	
2014–15	DNP			
2015–16	DNP			
2016–17	5	Reg. Pref.	3rd	

- 15 seasons in Tercera División
