= UD Carcaixent =

Carcaixent
- Full name: Unión Deportiva Carcaixent
- Nickname: Blanquinegros (White-and-blacks)
- Founded: 1935
- Ground: Quatre Camins, Carcaixent, Valencia, Spain
- Capacity: 3,000
- Chairman: José Vidal Ribero
- Manager: Xesco Ortíz
- League: Primera FFCV – Group 3
- 2025–26: Lliga Comunitat – South, 14th of 16
Home colours	Away colours

Unión Deportiva Carcaixent is a Spanish football team based in Carcaixent, in the Valencian Community. Founded in 1935, for the 2024-2025 season they play in Primera FFCV – Group 3, holding home games at Camp de Fútbol Quatre Camins, which has a capacity of 3,000 spectators.

== History ==
Founded in 1935, the club first reached the Tercera División in 1943. On 14 September 2012, UD Carcaixent merged with CF Atlètic Carcaixent, with the latter club being a part of their structure.

== Season to season ==
Season	Tier	Division	Place	Copa del Rey
1940–41	4	1ª Reg.	3rd	
1941–42	3	1ª Reg.	2nd	
1942–43	3	1ª Reg.	3rd	
1943–44	3	3ª	2nd	
1944–45	4	1ª Reg.	2nd	
1945–46	3	3ª	7th	
1946–47	3	3ª	9th	
1947–48	4	1ª Reg.	4th	
1948–49	4	1ª Reg.	4th	
1949–50	4	1ª Reg.	6th	
1950–51	4	1ª Reg.	6th	
1951–52	4	1ª Reg.	5th	
1952–53	4	1ª Reg.	10th	
1953–54	4	1ª Reg.	3rd	
1954–55	4	1ª Reg.	4th	
1955–56	4	1ª Reg.	4th	
1956–57	3	3ª	3rd	
1957–58	3	3ª	6th	
1958–59	3	3ª	12th	
1959–60	3	3ª	16th	

Season	Tier	Division	Place	Copa del Rey
1960–61	4	1ª Reg.	10th	
1961–62	4	1ª Reg.	1st	
1962–63	3	3ª	7th	
1963–64	3	3ª	13th	
1964–65	3	3ª	6th	
1965–66	3	3ª	7th	
1966–67	3	3ª	15th	
1967–68	3	3ª	15th	
1968–69	4	1ª Reg.	5th	
1969–70	4	1ª Reg.	20th	
1970–71	5	1ª Reg.	11th	
1971–72	5	1ª Reg.	18th	
1972–73	6	2ª Reg.		
1973–74	5	1ª Reg.	8th	
1974–75	5	1ª Reg.	3rd	
1975–76	5	1ª Reg.	3rd	
1976–77	5	1ª Reg.	3rd	
1977–78	5	Reg. Pref.	5th	
1978–79	5	Reg. Pref.	2nd	
1979–80	4	3ª	6th	Second round

Season	Tier	Division	Place	Copa del Rey
1980–81	4	3ª	2nd	First round
1981–82	4	3ª	12th	First round
1982–83	4	3ª	17th	
1983–84	4	3ª	18th	
1984–85	4	3ª	7th	
1985–86	4	3ª	20th	
1986–87	5	Reg. Pref.	18th	
1987–88	5	Reg. Pref.	5th	
1988–89	5	Reg. Pref.	1st	
1989–90	4	3ª	3rd	
1990–91	4	3ª	14th	Second round
1991–92	4	3ª	7th	
1992–93	4	3ª	15th	
1993–94	5	Reg. Pref.	4th	
1994–95	5	Reg. Pref.	5th	
1995–96	5	Reg. Pref.	5th	
1996–97	5	Reg. Pref.	8th	
1997–98	5	Reg. Pref.	1st	
1998–99	5	Reg. Pref.	2nd	
1999–2000	5	Reg. Pref.	7th	

Season	Tier	Division	Place	Copa del Rey
2000–01	5	Reg. Pref.	2nd	
2001–02	4	3ª	17th	
2002–03	4	3ª	20th	
2003–04	5	Reg. Pref.	9th	
2004–05	5	Reg. Pref.	5th	
2005–06	5	Reg. Pref.	6th	
2006–07	5	Reg. Pref.	10th	
2007–08	5	Reg. Pref.	4th	
2008–09	5	Reg. Pref.	16th	
2009–10	6	1ª Reg.	3rd	
2010–11	6	1ª Reg.	1st	
2011–12	5	Reg. Pref.	12th	
2012–13	5	Reg. Pref.	13th	
2013–14	5	Reg. Pref.	16th	
2014–15	6	1ª Reg.	3rd	
2015–16	6	1ª Reg.	2nd	
2016–17	5	Reg. Pref.	11th	
2017–18	5	Reg. Pref.	14th	
2018–19	5	Reg. Pref.	12th	
2019–20	5	Reg. Pref.	4th	

Season	Tier	Division	Place	Copa del Rey
2020–21	5	Reg. Pref.	6th	
2021–22	6	Reg. Pref.	3rd	
2022–23	6	Reg. Pref.	10th	
2023–24	7	1ª FFCV	1st	
2024–25	6	Lliga Com.	9th	
2025–26	6	Lliga Com.	14th	
2026–27	7	1ª FFCV		

- 26 seasons in Tercera División
