= Barbate CF =

- Full name: Barbate Club de Fútbol
- Nickname: Bajunos
- Founded: 1945; 81 years ago
- Ground: Estadio Municipal de Barbate, Barbate, Andalusia, Spain
- Capacity: 2,000
- President: (Spain) Antonio Malia
- Head coach: (Spain) Jose Manuel Reyes
- League: Primera Andaluza Cádiz
- 2025–26: Primera Andaluza Cádiz, 11th of 16
Home colours	Away colours

Barbate Club de Fútbol is a Spanish football team based in Barbate. Founded in 1945, the team plays in Primera Andaluza Cádiz. The club's home ground is Municipal de Barbate. As of 2026, Barbate CF plays against Cádiz in Club Friendly Games.

== Season to season ==
Season	Tier	Division	Place	Copa del Rey
1945–1953	—	Regional	—	
1954–55	4	1ª Reg.	9th	
1955–56	4	1ª Reg.	4th	
1956–57	3	3ª	5th	
1957–58	3	3ª	11th	
1958–59	3	3ª	8th	
1959–60	3	3ª	14th	
1960–61	3	3ª	10th	
1961–62	3	3ª	14th	
1962–63	3	3ª	14th	
1963–64	3	3ª	16th	
1964–65	DNP			
1965–66	DNP			
1966–67	DNP			
1967–68	5	2ª Reg.		
1968–69	4	1ª Reg.	4th	
1969–70	4	1ª Reg.	10th	
1970–71	4	1ª Reg.	14th	
1971–72	4	1ª Reg.	16th	
1972–73	4	1ª Reg.	11th	

Season	Tier	Division	Place	Copa del Rey
1973–74	4	1ª Reg.	17th	
1974–75	4	1ª Reg.	11th	
1975–76	5	1ª Reg.	4th	
1976–77	5	1ª Reg.	21st	
1977–78	6	1ª Reg.	22nd	
1978–79	7	2ª Reg.	17th	
1979–80	7	2ª Reg.		
1980–81	6	1ª Reg.	1st	
1981–82	5	Reg. Pref.	13th	
1982–83	5	Reg. Pref.	15th	
1983–84	5	Reg. Pref.	9th	
1984–85	5	Reg. Pref.	7th	
1985–86	5	Reg. Pref.	6th	
1986–87	5	Reg. Pref.	4th	
1987–88	5	Reg. Pref.	14th	
1988–89	5	Reg. Pref.	3rd	
1989–90	5	Reg. Pref.	4th	
1990–91	5	Reg. Pref.	6th	
1991–92	5	Reg. Pref.	8th	
1992–93	5	Reg. Pref.	7th	

Season	Tier	Division	Place	Copa del Rey
1993–94	5	Reg. Pref.	7th	
1994–95	5	Reg. Pref.	17th	
1995–96	6	1ª Reg.	3rd	
1996–97	6	1ª Reg.	5th	
1997–98	5	Reg. Pref.	18th	
1998–99	6	1ª Reg.	3rd	
1999–2000	5	Reg. Pref.	10th	
2000–01	5	Reg. Pref.	12th	
2001–02	5	Reg. Pref.	13th	
2002–03	5	Reg. Pref.	14th	
2003–04	5	Reg. Pref.	9th	
2004–05	5	1ª And.	3rd	
2005–06	5	1ª And.	4th	
2006–07	5	1ª And.	8th	
2007–08	5	1ª And.	16th	
2008–09	6	Reg. Pref.	4th	
2009–10	6	Reg. Pref.	3rd	
2010–11	5	1ª And.	7th	
2011–12	6	Reg. Pref.	10th	
2012–13	6	Reg. Pref.	9th	

Season	Tier	Division	Place	Copa del Rey
2013–14	6	Reg. Pref.	11th	
2014–15	6	2ª And.	8th	
2015–16	6	2ª And.	12th	
2016–17	7	2ª And.	11th	
2017–18	7	2ª And.	12th	
2018–19	7	2ª And.	4th	
2019–20	6	1ª And.	16th	
2020–21	6	1ª And.	(R)	
2021–22	8	2ª And.	2nd	
2022–23	7	1ª And.	14th	
2023–24	8	2ª And.	2nd	
2024–25	7	1ª And.	6th	
2025–26	7	1ª And.		

- 8 seasons in Tercera División

== Notable former players ==
- (Spain) Pejiño
- (Spain) Chico Cebolla
- (Spain) Bryan Gil
- (Spain) Francis Pérez
- (Spain) Juan "Melli"
