= CD Soledad =

Spanish football club

Soledad
- Full name: Club Deportivo Soledad
- Founded: 17 December 1930
- Dissolved: 29 June 2010
- Ground: Son Malferit, Palma, Balearic Islands, Spain
- Capacity: 3,500
- 2009–10: Regional Preferente – Mallorca, 6th of 20
Home colours	Away colours

Club Deportivo Soledad was a Spanish football team based in Palma, Majorca, in the autonomous community of Balearic Islands. Founded in 1930, it played its last season in Regional Preferente – Mallorca, holding home games at Estadio Son Malferit, with a capacity of 3,500 seats.

== History ==
In 2005, Soledad was merged with CD Paguera, which had just promoted to Tercera División. In July 2010, CD Soledad was forced to dissolved due to not be able to pay fully debts with its players.

=== Club background ===
- Club Deportivo Soledad - (1930–2005; 2006–10)
- Club Deportivo Soledad-Paguera - (2005–06)

== Season to season ==
Season	Tier	Division	Place	Copa del Rey
1931–32	6	3ª Reg.	(R)	
1932–33	6	3ª Reg.	4th	
1933–34	6	3ª Reg.	2nd	
1934–35	4	2ª Reg.	2nd	
1935–36	4	2ª Reg.	2nd	
1939–40	4	2ª Reg.	1st	
1940–41	4	2ª Reg.	1st	
1941–42	4	2ª Reg.	1st	
1942–43	4	2ª Reg.	3rd	
1943–44	4	1ª Reg.	5th	
1944–45	4	1ª Reg.	2nd	
1945–46	4	1ª Reg.	2nd	
1946–47	4	1ª Reg.	2nd	
1947–48	4	1ª Reg.	2nd	
1948–49	4	1ª Reg.	5th	
1949–50	4	1ª Reg.		
1950–51	4	1ª Reg.	1st	
1951–52	4	1ª Reg.	4th	
1952–53	4	1ª Reg.	3rd	
1953–54	4	1ª Reg.	9th	

Season	Tier	Division	Place	Copa del Rey
1954–55	4	1ª Reg.	3rd	
1955–56	3	3ª	6th	
1956–57	3	3ª	7th	
1957–58	3	3ª	15th	
1958–59	3	3ª	10th	
1959–60	3	3ª	11th	
1960–61	3	3ª	3rd	
1961–62	3	3ª	4th	
1962–63	3	3ª	9th	
1963–64	3	3ª	6th	
1964–65	3	3ª	3rd	
1965–66	3	3ª	5th	
1966–67	3	3ª	4th	
1967–68	3	3ª	8th	
1968–69	3	3ª	18th	
1969–70	3	3ª	20th	
1970–71	4	1ª Reg.	2nd	
1971–72	4	1ª Reg.	12th	
1972–73	5	1ª Reg.	5th	
1973–74	5	1ª Reg.	3rd	

Season	Tier	Division	Place	Copa del Rey
1974–75	4	Reg. Pref.	8th	
1975–76	4	Reg. Pref.	16th	
1976–77	5	1ª Reg.	12th	
1977–78	6	1ª Reg.	9th	
1978–79	6	1ª Reg.	11th	
1979–80	6	1ª Reg.	9th	
1980–81	6	1ª Reg.	15th	
1981–82	6	1ª Reg.	10th	
1982–83	6	1ª Reg.	8th	
1983–84	6	1ª Reg.	3rd	
1984–85	6	1ª Reg.	4th	
1985–86	6	1ª Reg.	6th	
1986–87	6	1ª Reg.	7th	
1987–88	6	1ª Reg.	4th	
1988–89	5	Reg. Pref.	7th	
1989–90	5	Reg. Pref.	17th	
1990–91	6	1ª Reg.	15th	
1991–92	6	1ª Reg.	4th	

Season	Tier	Division	Place	Copa del Rey
1992–93	6	1ª Reg.	1st	
1993–94	5	Reg. Pref.	14th	
1994–95	5	Reg. Pref.	11th	
1995–96	5	Reg. Pref.	15th	
1996–97	5	Reg. Pref.	16th	
1997–98	5	Reg. Pref.	6th	
1998–99	4	3ª	18th	
1999–2000	5	Reg. Pref.	8th	
2000–01	5	Reg. Pref.	14th	
2001–02	5	Reg. Pref.	9th	
2002–03	5	Reg. Pref.	20th	
2003–04	6	1ª Reg.	17th	
2004–05	7	2ª Reg.	6th	
2005–06	4	3ª	19th	
2006–07	5	Reg. Pref.	5th	
2007–08	4	3ª	13th	
2008–09	4	3ª	5th	
2009–10	5	Reg. Pref.	6th	

- 19 seasons in Tercera División
