= 1963–64 Tercera División =

Tercera División
- Season: 1963–64

The 1963–64 Tercera División season was the 28th since its establishment.

== League tables ==
=== Group I ===
Pos	Team	Pld	W	D	L	GF	GA	GD	Pts
1	Compostela	30	23	4	3	91	19	+72	50
2	Fabril	30	20	8	2	77	22	+55	48
3	Racing de Ferrol	30	21	6	3	106	25	+81	48
4	Lugo	30	16	7	7	60	32	+28	39
5	Arsenal	30	14	6	10	42	44	−2	34
6	Turista	30	12	5	13	44	52	−8	29
7	Foz	30	12	5	13	42	57	−15	29
8	Couto	30	12	4	14	45	49	−4	28
9	Choco	30	12	4	14	38	44	−6	28
10	Alondras	30	10	6	14	38	52	−14	26
11	Gran Peña	30	8	7	15	38	60	−22	23
12	Arosa	30	8	7	15	29	48	−19	23
13	Lemos	30	8	6	16	35	61	−26	22
14	Coruxo	30	7	5	18	32	86	−54	19
15	Bueu	30	6	6	18	33	64	−31	18
16	Marín	30	6	4	20	27	62	−35	16

=== Group II ===
Pos	Team	Pld	W	D	L	GF	GA	GD	Pts
1	Caudal	30	22	5	3	90	32	+58	49
2	Real Avilés	30	20	8	2	75	21	+54	48
3	La Camocha	30	16	9	5	61	34	+27	41
4	Llanares	30	16	4	10	61	43	+18	36
5	Turón	30	12	6	12	66	57	+9	30
6	Praviano	30	11	8	11	50	47	+3	30
7	San Martín	30	10	9	11	44	51	−7	29
8	Candás	30	9	11	10	42	40	+2	29
9	Siero	30	11	7	12	50	54	−4	29
10	Pelayo	30	12	5	13	44	49	−5	29
11	Luarca	30	11	7	12	34	42	−8	29
12	Santiago de Aller	30	12	2	16	34	57	−23	26
13	Vetusta	30	9	8	13	38	57	−19	26
14	Santa Marina	30	7	7	16	35	57	−22	21
15	Calzada	30	6	4	20	29	72	−43	16
16	Somió	30	4	4	22	41	81	−40	12

=== Group III ===
Pos	Team	Pld	W	D	L	GF	GA	GD	Pts
1	Barakaldo	30	24	3	3	67	30	+37	51
2	Gimnástica de Torrelavega	30	20	7	3	69	22	+47	47
3	Arenas de Getxo	30	20	4	6	62	24	+38	44
4	Santurtzi	30	13	10	7	44	32	+12	36
5	Getxo	30	14	6	10	59	47	+12	34
6	Sestao	30	13	7	10	42	30	+12	33
7	Baskonia	30	12	5	13	44	45	−1	29
8	Erandio	30	11	5	14	40	52	−12	27
9	Rayo Cantabria	30	10	7	13	43	48	−5	27
10	Amorebieta	30	10	7	13	46	53	−7	27
11	Portugalete	30	10	7	13	27	40	−13	27
12	Guarnizo	30	8	8	14	36	49	−13	24
13	Unión Club	30	8	7	15	45	57	−12	23
14	Barreda	30	7	6	17	31	63	−32	20
15	Galdakao	30	9	1	20	47	67	−20	19
16	Naval	30	4	4	22	24	67	−43	12

=== Group IV ===
Pos	Team	Pld	W	D	L	GF	GA	GD	Pts
1	Real Unión	30	19	6	5	72	35	+37	44
2	Eibar	30	19	5	6	82	28	+54	43
3	Logroñés	30	19	4	7	71	30	+41	42
4	Chantrea	30	16	6	8	51	39	+12	38
5	San Sebastián	30	14	6	10	60	42	+18	34
6	Mirandés	30	15	2	13	51	56	−5	32
7	Beasain	30	12	6	12	53	56	−3	30
8	Touring	30	13	3	14	47	46	+1	29
9	Alfaro	30	12	4	14	50	64	−14	28
10	Euskalduna	30	11	6	13	60	57	+3	28
11	Oberena	30	12	3	15	49	63	−14	27
12	Aurrerá Ondarroa	30	10	7	13	56	60	−4	27
13	Azkoyen	30	8	9	13	34	48	−14	25
14	Mondragón	30	11	1	18	43	67	−24	23
15	Tolosa	30	10	2	18	28	60	−32	22
16	Iruña	30	4	0	26	22	78	−56	8

=== Group V ===
Pos	Team	Pld	W	D	L	GF	GA	GD	Pts
1	Calvo Sotelo Andorra	30	22	5	3	98	10	+88	49
2	Numancia	30	24	1	5	98	18	+80	49
3	Calatayud	30	17	5	8	44	31	+13	39
4	Huesca	30	15	7	8	61	31	+30	37
5	Tarazona	30	16	5	9	49	30	+19	37
6	Ejea	30	14	7	9	53	34	+19	35
7	Caspe	30	15	4	11	47	40	+7	34
8	Mequinenza	30	14	4	12	59	43	+16	32
9	Amistad	30	12	8	10	47	41	+6	32
10	Calvo Sotelo Escatrón	30	9	5	16	35	57	−22	23
11	Barbastro	30	9	4	17	31	71	−40	22
12	Alcañiz	30	7	8	15	33	59	−26	22
13	Arenas	30	9	3	18	34	74	−40	21
14	Atlético Monzón	30	5	8	17	32	88	−56	18
15	Teruel	30	6	5	19	27	65	−38	17
16	Sabiñánigo	30	4	5	21	23	79	−56	10 (Note: 3 points deducted)

=== Group VI-VII ===
Pos	Team	Pld	W	D	L	GF	GA	GD	Pts
1	Sabadell	38	27	4	7	92	42	+50	58
2	Lleida	38	25	4	9	82	37	+45	54
3	Gimnàstic de Tarragona	38	21	10	7	74	42	+32	52
4	Terrassa	38	19	7	12	67	51	+16	45
5	Sant Andreu	38	17	10	11	65	47	+18	44
6	Girona	38	18	6	14	86	63	+23	42
7	Tortosa	38	18	3	17	66	68	−2	39
8	Condal	38	15	8	15	58	50	+8	38
9	Calella	38	14	10	14	54	64	−10	38
10	Granollers	38	14	8	16	64	63	+1	36
11	Reus	38	14	7	17	51	54	−3	35
12	Vilafranca	38	12	10	16	71	82	−11	34
13	Mataró	38	12	10	16	65	77	−12	34
14	Manresa	38	13	8	17	59	77	−18	34
15	Sants	38	12	9	17	49	61	−12	33
16	Fabra y Coats	38	13	6	19	54	67	−13	32
17	Vic	38	10	12	16	60	76	−16	32
18	Atlètic Gironella	38	11	7	20	54	89	−35	29
19	Vilanova	38	9	10	19	48	78	−30	28
20	Puig-Reig	38	7	9	22	55	86	−31	21 (Note: 2 points deducted)

=== Group VIII ===
Pos	Team	Pld	W	D	L	GF	GA	GD	Pts
1	Menorca	14	8	4	2	25	10	+15	20
2	Atlético Baleares	14	8	3	3	20	9	+11	19
3	Mahón	14	8	3	3	31	16	+15	19
4	Manacor	14	5	4	5	23	14	+9	14
5	Atlètic de Ciutadella	14	5	4	5	12	21	−9	14
6	Soledad	14	3	5	6	11	17	−6	11
7	Alaior	14	2	4	8	10	32	−22	8
8	Ibiza	14	2	3	9	17	30	−13	7

=== Group IX ===
Pos	Team	Pld	W	D	L	GF	GA	GD	Pts
1	Castellón	30	20	7	3	70	29	+41	47
2	Alzira	30	18	6	6	56	26	+30	42
3	Acero	30	17	4	9	61	43	+18	38
4	Atlético Saguntino	30	15	7	8	49	40	+9	37
5	Onda	30	14	8	8	42	34	+8	36
6	Gandía	30	12	7	11	45	43	+2	31
7	Requena	30	14	3	13	45	60	−15	31
8	Olímpic de Xàtiva	30	13	4	13	64	48	+16	30
9	Alcoyano	30	11	7	12	43	40	+3	29
10	Buñol	30	9	9	12	47	50	−3	27
11	Canals	30	11	4	15	38	43	−5	26
12	Sueca	30	11	4	15	35	53	−18	26
13	Carcaixent	30	10	5	15	43	52	−9	25
14	Oliva	30	9	3	18	44	61	−17	21
15	Tavernes	30	5	10	15	40	61	−21	20
16	Cullera	30	5	4	21	44	83	−39	14

=== Group X ===
Pos	Team	Pld	W	D	L	GF	GA	GD	Pts
1	Albacete	30	24	4	2	67	20	+47	52
2	Cartagena	30	20	8	2	73	16	+57	48
3	Jumilla	30	14	5	11	48	37	+11	33
4	Atlético Cartagena	30	14	4	12	57	45	+12	32
5	Imperial	30	13	5	12	56	39	+17	31
6	Cieza	30	14	2	14	52	34	+18	30
7	Rayo Ibense	30	13	3	14	43	55	−12	29
8	Alicante	30	9	11	10	29	31	−2	29
9	La Roda	30	12	4	14	51	59	−8	28
10	Almansa	30	12	3	15	47	55	−8	27
11	Orihuela	30	11	5	14	36	53	−17	27
12	Ilicitano	30	10	6	14	53	58	−5	26
13	Lorca	30	10	5	15	35	50	−15	25
14	Monóvar	30	10	4	16	44	71	−27	24
15	Águilas	30	7	7	16	38	65	−27	21
16	Madrigueras	30	8	2	20	26	67	−41	18

=== Group XI ===
Pos	Team	Pld	W	D	L	GF	GA	GD	Pts
1	Atlético Malagueño	30	16	8	6	39	15	+24	40
2	Atlético Cordobés	30	15	9	6	58	24	+34	39
3	Real Jaén	30	15	5	10	42	34	+8	35
4	Antequerano	30	15	5	10	43	32	+11	35
5	Juan Sebastián Elcano	30	15	5	10	38	31	+7	35
6	Atlético Marbella	30	15	4	11	54	37	+17	34
7	Ronda	30	14	3	13	50	46	+4	31
8	Fuengirola	30	13	5	12	46	47	−1	31
9	Recreativo de Granada	30	13	3	14	45	43	+2	29
10	Atlético Prieguense	30	11	7	12	36	36	0	29
11	Hispania	30	11	6	13	38	41	−3	28
12	Adra	30	12	1	17	43	48	−5	25
13	Iliturgi	30	8	7	15	26	40	−14	23
14	Riffien Jadú	30	8	6	16	22	58	−36	22
15	Linares	30	8	6	16	31	52	−21	22
16	Veleño	30	7	8	15	23	50	−27	22

=== Group XII ===
Pos	Team	Pld	W	D	L	GF	GA	GD	Pts
1	Jerez Industrial	30	22	5	3	68	25	+43	49
2	Xerez	30	22	4	4	82	21	+61	48
3	Balompédica Linense	30	21	5	4	63	23	+40	47
4	Portuense	30	21	4	5	72	19	+53	46
5	Riotinto	30	17	6	7	51	31	+20	40
6	Ayamonte	30	14	8	8	39	41	−2	36
7	Sevilla Atlético	30	11	7	12	59	43	+16	29
8	Balón de Cádiz	30	11	5	14	44	48	−4	27
9	Kimber Utrera	30	8	11	11	47	47	0	27
10	Chiclanero	30	9	6	15	41	50	−9	24
11	Puerto Real	30	9	6	15	32	48	−16	24
12	Écija	30	9	4	17	36	63	−27	22
13	Coria	30	6	6	18	29	57	−28	18
14	La Palma	30	7	1	22	32	77	−45	15
15	Cañamera	30	5	5	20	25	76	−51	15
16	Barbate	30	4	5	21	24	75	−51	13

=== Group XIII ===
Pos	Team	Pld	W	D	L	GF	GA	GD	Pts
1	Béjar Industrial	30	23	4	3	86	18	+68	50
2	Ponferradina	30	21	4	5	70	28	+42	46
3	Cultural Leonesa	30	20	4	6	58	21	+37	44
4	Europa Delicias	30	20	3	7	81	30	+51	43
5	Salmantino	30	15	6	9	38	36	+2	36
6	La Bañeza	30	14	5	11	42	50	−8	33
7	Juventud	30	13	5	12	38	50	−12	31
8	Hullera Vasco-Leonesa	30	12	5	13	55	43	+12	29
9	Júpiter Leonés	30	11	6	13	55	46	+9	28
10	Arandina	30	10	5	15	41	54	−13	25
11	Gimnástica Medinense	30	10	5	15	46	58	−12	25
12	Peñaranda	30	7	8	15	25	56	−31	22
13	Ciudad Rodrigo	30	10	1	19	42	80	−38	21
14	Astorga	30	7	5	18	37	67	−30	19
15	Palencia	30	7	5	18	26	55	−29	16 (Note: 3 points deducted)
16	San Pedro	30	2	5	23	16	64	−48	7 (Note: 2 points deducted)

=== Group XIV ===
Pos	Team	Pld	W	D	L	GF	GA	GD	Pts
1	Plus Ultra	30	21	8	1	79	15	+64	50
2	Toledo	30	20	7	3	82	37	+45	47
3	Rayo Vallecano	30	18	6	6	84	33	+51	42
4	Talavera	30	15	9	6	57	43	+14	39
5	Carabanchel	30	17	4	9	65	39	+26	38
6	Gimnástica Segoviana	30	15	7	8	71	46	+25	37
7	Real Ávila	30	10	11	9	49	47	+2	31
8	Femsa	30	12	3	15	52	64	−12	27
9	Getafe	30	8	9	13	34	58	−24	25
10	Guadalajara	30	10	5	15	43	44	−1	25
11	Conquense	30	9	7	14	33	44	−11	25
12	Alcalá	30	7	9	14	40	60	−20	23
13	Leganés	30	7	6	17	43	68	−25	20
14	Santa Bárbara	30	7	5	18	38	74	−36	19
15	Torrijos	30	8	1	21	32	82	−50	17
16	Real Aranjuez	30	5	5	20	35	83	−48	15

=== Group XV ===
Pos	Team	Pld	W	D	L	GF	GA	GD	Pts
1	Calvo Sotelo	28	18	6	4	73	28	+45	42
2	Extremadura	28	15	11	2	66	28	+38	41
3	Badajoz	28	16	6	6	68	33	+35	38
4	Cacereño	28	13	7	8	57	37	+20	33
5	Villarrobledo	28	13	5	10	47	36	+11	31
6	Socuéllamos	28	10	9	9	34	51	−17	29
7	Manchego	28	10	8	10	38	39	−1	28
8	Díter Zafra	28	11	6	11	35	41	−6	28
9	Don Benito	28	12	3	13	51	59	−8	27
10	Tomelloso	28	10	7	11	37	47	−10	27
11	Emeritense	28	7	12	9	43	43	0	26
12	Alcázar	28	6	9	13	35	52	−17	21
13	Madrileño	28	6	8	14	41	52	−11	20
14	Pedro Muñoz	28	5	6	17	35	75	−40	16
15	Plasencia	28	3	7	18	27	66	−39	13

== Promotion playoff ==
=== Champions ===
==== First round ====
Team 1	Agg.	Team 2	1st leg	2nd leg
Plus Ultra	3–2	Lleida	2–1	1–1
Calvo Sotelo Andorra	4–3	Compostela	3–0	1–3
Calvo Sotelo	(t) 2–2	Atlético Malagueño	1–0	1–2
Sabadell	3–2	Castellón	3–1	0–1
Real Unión	(t) 3–3	Béjar Industrial	2–0	1–3
Albacete	3–2	Jerez Industrial	2–0	1–2
Menorca	7–3	Caudal	2–0	5–3

==== Final Round ====
Team 1	Agg.	Team 2	1st leg	2nd leg
Barakaldo	4–3	Calvo Sotelo Andorra	3–1	1–2
Albacete	0–4	Sabadell	0–1	0–3
Real Unión	(t) 3–3	Plus Ultra	3–1	0–2
Calvo Sotelo	(t) 3–3	Menorca	3–0	0–3

=== Runners-up ===
==== First round ====
Team 1	Agg.	Team 2	1st leg	2nd leg
Ponferradina	3–4	Fabril	2–2	1–2
Gimnástica de Torrelavega	5–2	Atlético Cordobés	4–1	1–1
Numancia	2–4	Gimnàstic de Tarragona	2–0	0–4
Cartagena	3–1	Terrassa	2–0	1–1
Real Avilés	3–4	Atlético Baleares	2–1	1–3
Extremadura	5–1	Alzira	3–1	2–0
Xerez	5–2	Toledo	3–0	2–2

==== Second round ====
Team 1	Agg.	Team 2	1st leg	2nd leg
Fabril	3–3 (t)	Gimnástica de Torrelavega	2–1	1–2
Eibar	4–4 (t)	Gimnàstic de Tarragona	4–1	0–3
Cartagena	4–1	Atlético Baleares	2–0	2–1
Extremadura	3–2	Xerez	2–0	1–2

==== Final Round ====
Team 1	Agg.	Team 2	1st leg	2nd leg
Gimnástica de Torrelavega	2–9	Badalona	1–3	1–6
Gimnàstic de Tarragona	3–3 (t)	L'Hospitalet	3–1	0–2
Cartagena	1–3	Atlético Ceuta	1–1	0–2
Extremadura	2–4	Abarán	1–2	1–2

== Season records ==
- Most wins: 27, Sabadell.
- Most draws: 12, Vic and Emeritense.
- Most losses: 26, Iruña.
- Most goals for: 106, Racing de Ferrol.
- Most goals against: 89, Atlètic Gironella.
- Most points: 58, Sabadell.
- Fewest wins: 2, Alaior, Ibiza and San Pedro.
- Fewest draws: 0, Iruña.
- Fewest losses: 1, Plus Ultra.
- Fewest goals for: 10, Alaior.
- Fewest goals against: 9, Atlético Baleares.
- Fewest points: 7, Ibiza and San Pedro.
