= Adra CF =

Spanish football team (1946–1970)

Adra
- Full name: Adra Club de Fútbol
- Founded: 1946
- Dissolved: 1970
- Ground: Estadio Miramar, Adra, Andalusia, Spain
- Capacity: 4,000
- 1969–70: 3ª – Group 6, 20th of 20 (relegated)
Home colours	Away colours

Adra Club de Fútbol was a Spanish football team based in Adra, in the autonomous community of Andalusia. Founded in 1946, the club was dissolved in 1970.

== History ==
Founded in 1946 as Trafalgar Club de Fútbol, the club achieved promotion to Tercera División in 1956. In that season, the club managed to reach the promotion play-offs, but were knocked out in the semifinals by Coria CF.

In 1957, Trafalgar changed name to Adra Club de Fútbol. The club won their group in the 1958–59 season, but also missed out promotion in the play-offs. They also played in the 1969–70 Copa del Generalísimo, but were dissolved at the end of that campaign.

Football in the city of Adra would continue in the following years, with AD Adra (founded in 1975 and dissolved in 2011), CF Adra (founded in 2011 as CD Adra Milenaria) and CD Adra Trafalgar (founded in 2023).

== Season to season ==
Season	Tier	Division	Place	Copa del Rey
1946–1956	—	Regional	—	
1956–57	3	3ª	2nd	
1957–58	3	3ª	3rd	
1958–59	3	3ª	1st	
1959–60	3	3ª	7th	
1960–61	3	3ª	9th	
1961–62	3	3ª	9th	
1962–63	3	3ª	4th	

Season	Tier	Division	Place	Copa del Rey
1963–64	3	3ª	12th	
1964–65	3	3ª	9th	
1965–66	3	3ª	7th	
1966–67	3	3ª	13th	
1967–68	3	3ª	10th	
1968–69	3	3ª	17th	
1969–70	3	3ª	20th	First round

- 14 seasons in Tercera División
