= Luarca CF =

Spanish football club

Luarca
- Full name: Luarca Club de Fútbol
- Founded: 1912
- Ground: La Veigona, Luarca, Asturias, Spain
- Capacity: 1,500
- President: (Spain) Jesús Pérez-Villamil
- Head coach: (Spain) Pablo Lago
- League: Primera Asturfútbol
- 2024–25: Primera Asturfútbol, 8th of 20
| Home colours | Away colours |

Luarca Club de Fútbol is a Spanish football team based in Luarca, in the autonomous community of Asturias. Founded in 1912, it plays in Primera Asturfútbol, holding home games at Estadio La Veigona, which has a capacity of 1,500 spectators.

== Season to season ==
| Season | Level | Division | Place | Copa del Rey |
|---|---|---|---|---|
| 1949–50 | 5 | 2ª Reg. | | |
| 1950–51 | 4 | 1ª Reg. | 3rd | |
| 1951–52 | 4 | 1ª Reg. | 3rd | |
| 1952–53 | DNP | | | |
| 1953–54 | 4 | 1ª Reg. | 8th | |
| 1954–55 | 4 | 1ª Reg. | 4th | |
| 1955–56 | 4 | 1ª Reg. | 2nd | |
| 1956–57 | 4 | 1ª Reg. | 1st | |
| 1957–58 | 3 | 3ª | 3rd | |
| 1958–59 | 3 | 3ª | 6th | |
| 1959–60 | 3 | 3ª | 8th | |
| 1960–61 | 3 | 3ª | 9th | |
| 1961–62 | 3 | 3ª | 12th | |
| 1962–63 | 3 | 3ª | 12th | |
| 1963–64 | 3 | 3ª | 11th | |
| 1964–65 | 3 | 3ª | 9th | |
| 1965–66 | 3 | 3ª | 9th | |
| 1966–67 | 3 | 3ª | 15th | |
| 1967–68 | 4 | 1ª Reg. | 11th | |
| 1968–69 | 4 | 1ª Reg. | 8th | |

| Season | Level | Division | Place | Copa del Rey |
|---|---|---|---|---|
| 1969–70 | 4 | 1ª Reg. | 7th | |
| 1970–71 | 4 | 1ª Reg. | 16th | |
| 1971–72 | 4 | 1ª Reg. | 6th | |
| 1972–73 | 4 | 1ª Reg. | 5th | |
| 1973–74 | 4 | Reg. Pref. | 10th | |
| 1974–75 | 4 | Reg. Pref. | 10th | |
| 1975–76 | 4 | Reg. Pref. | 17th | |
| 1976–77 | 5 | 1ª Reg. | 1st | |
| 1977–78 | 5 | Reg. Pref. | 18th | |
| 1978–79 | 5 | Reg. Pref. | 14th | |
| 1979–80 | 5 | Reg. Pref. | 5th | |
| 1980–81 | 5 | Reg. Pref. | 9th | |
| 1981–82 | 5 | Reg. Pref. | 12th | |
| 1982–83 | 5 | Reg. Pref. | 4th | |
| 1983–84 | 5 | Reg. Pref. | 6th | |
| 1984–85 | 5 | Reg. Pref. | 10th | |
| 1985–86 | 5 | Reg. Pref. | 8th | |
| 1986–87 | 5 | Reg. Pref. | 3rd | |
| 1987–88 | 4 | 3ª | 17th | |
| 1988–89 | 4 | 3ª | 14th | |

| Season | Level | Division | Place | Copa del Rey |
|---|---|---|---|---|
| 1989–90 | 4 | 3ª | 15th | |
| 1990–91 | 4 | 3ª | 20th | |
| 1991–92 | 5 | Reg. Pref. | 13th | |
| 1992–93 | 5 | Reg. Pref. | 15th | |
| 1993–94 | 5 | Reg. Pref. | 19th | |
| 1994–95 | 6 | 1ª Reg. | 14th | |
| 1995–96 | 6 | 1ª Reg. | 9th | |
| 1996–97 | 6 | 1ª Reg. | 19th | |
| 1997–98 | 7 | 2ª Reg. | 3rd | |
| 1998–99 | 7 | 2ª Reg. | 1st | |
| 1999–2000 | 6 | 1ª Reg. | 8th | |
| 2000–01 | 6 | 1ª Reg. | 9th | |
| 2001–02 | 6 | 1ª Reg. | 10th | |
| 2002–03 | 6 | 1ª Reg. | 8th | |
| 2003–04 | 6 | 1ª Reg. | 4th | |
| 2004–05 | 6 | 1ª Reg. | 2nd | |
| 2005–06 | 5 | Reg. Pref. | 13th | |
| 2006–07 | 5 | Reg. Pref. | 16th | |
| 2007–08 | 6 | 1ª Reg. | 3rd | |
| 2008–09 | 5 | Reg. Pref. | 3rd | |

| Season | Level | Division | Place | Copa del Rey |
|---|---|---|---|---|
| 2009–10 | 4 | 3ª | 17th | |
| 2010–11 | 4 | 3ª | 13th | |
| 2011–12 | 4 | 3ª | 7th | |
| 2012–13 | 4 | 3ª | 10th | |
| 2013–14 | 4 | 3ª | 19th | |
| 2014–15 | 5 | Reg. Pref. | 16th | |
| 2015–16 | 5 | Reg. Pref. | 11th | |
| 2016–17 | 5 | Reg. Pref. | 19th | |
| 2017–18 | 6 | 1ª Reg. | 2nd | |
| 2018–19 | 6 | 1ª Reg. | 2nd | |
| 2019–20 | 6 | 1ª Reg. | 1st | |
| 2020–21 | 5 | Reg. Pref. | 1st | |
| 2021–22 | 5 | 3ª RFEF | 11th | |
| 2022–23 | 5 | 3ª Fed. | 13th | |
| 2023–24 | 5 | 3ª Fed. | 17th | |
| 2024–25 | 6 | 1ª Astur. | 8th | |
| 2025–26 | 6 | 1ª Astur. | | |

- 19 seasons in Tercera División
- 3 seasons in Tercera Federación/Tercera División RFEF
