= SC Requena =

Requena
- Full name: Sporting Club Requena
- Founded: 1928; 98 years ago
- Ground: Tomás Berlanga, Requena, Valencia, Spain
- Capacity: 3,200
- President: Emilio García
- Manager: Agustín González
- League: Primera FFCV – Group 2
- 2025–26: Lliga Comunitat – North, 14th of 16 (relegated)
Home colours	Away colours

Sporting Club Requena is a Spanish football team based in Requena, in the Valencian Community. Founded in 1928, they play in Primera FFCV – Group 2, holding home games at Estadio Municipal Tomás Berlanga, with a capacity of 3,200 people.

== History ==
Founded in 1928 as Unión Deportiva Requena, the club merged with Club Deportivo Requena in 1948 to form Sporting Club Requena. The club played in the regional leagues until 1963, when they achieved promotion to Tercera División.

=== Club background ===
- Unión Deportiva Requena (1928–1948)
- Sporting Club Requena (1948–)

== Season to season ==
Season	Tier	Division	Place	Copa del Rey
1929–1945	—	Regional	—	
1945–46	5	2ª Reg.	1st	
1946–47	4	1ª Reg.	9th	
1947–48	5	2ª Reg.	1st	
1948–49	5	2ª Reg.	3rd	
1949–50	6	3ª Reg.		
1950–51	6	3ª Reg.		
1951–52	6	3ª Reg.		
1952–53	6	3ª Reg.		
1953–54	6	3ª Reg.		
1954–55	6	3ª Reg.	1st	
1955–56	6	3ª Reg.		
1956–57	6	3ª Reg.		
1957–58	6	3ª Reg.		
1958–59	6	3ª Reg.		
1959–60	5	2ª Reg.	1st	
1960–61	4	1ª Reg.	3rd	
1961–62	4	1ª Reg.	4th	
1962–63	4	1ª Reg.	2nd	
1963–64	3	3ª	7th	

Season	Tier	Division	Place	Copa del Rey
1964–65	3	3ª	11th	
1965–66	3	3ª	10th	
1966–67	3	3ª	14th	
1967–68	3	3ª	14th	
1968–69	4	1ª Reg.	20th	
1969–70	5	2ª Reg.	5th	
1970–71	5	1ª Reg.	8th	
1971–72	5	1ª Reg.	12th	
1972–73	5	1ª Reg.	6th	
1973–74	5	1ª Reg.	16th	
1974–75	5	1ª Reg.	8th	
1975–76	5	1ª Reg.	13th	
1976–77	5	1ª Reg.	14th	
1977–78	6	1ª Reg.	8th	
1978–79	6	1ª Reg.	15th	
1979–80	6	1ª Reg.	18th	
1980–81	6	1ª Reg.	8th	
1981–82	6	1ª Reg.	4th	
1982–83	6	1ª Reg.	5th	
1983–84	6	1ª Reg.	1st	

Season	Tier	Division	Place	Copa del Rey
1984–85	5	Reg. Pref.	2nd	
1985–86	4	3ª	13th	
1986–87	4	3ª	11th	
1987–88	4	3ª	17th	
1988–89	4	3ª	19th	
1989–90	4	3ª	18th	
1990–91	5	Reg. Pref.	7th	
1991–92	5	Reg. Pref.	7th	
1992–93	5	Reg. Pref.	10th	
1993–94	5	Reg. Pref.	12th	
1994–95	5	Reg. Pref.	12th	
1995–96	5	Reg. Pref.	9th	
1996–97	5	Reg. Pref.	2nd	
1997–98	5	Reg. Pref.	1st	
1998–99	5	Reg. Pref.	1st	
1999–2000	5	Reg. Pref.	6th	
2000–01	5	Reg. Pref.	16th	
2001–02	6	1ª Reg.	3rd	
2002–03	6	1ª Reg.	1st	
2003–04	5	Reg. Pref.	14th	

Season	Tier	Division	Place	Copa del Rey
2004–05	5	Reg. Pref.	4th	
2005–06	5	Reg. Pref.	1st	
2006–07	4	3ª	22nd	
2007–08	5	Reg. Pref.	9th	
2008–09	5	Reg. Pref.	9th	
2009–10	5	Reg. Pref.	10th	
2010–11	5	Reg. Pref.	1st	
2011–12	4	3ª	18th	
2012–13	5	Reg. Pref.	5th	
2013–14	5	Reg. Pref.	3rd	
2014–15	4	3ª	20th	
2015–16	5	Reg. Pref.	11th	
2016–17	5	Reg. Pref.	4th	
2017–18	5	Reg. Pref.	14th	
2018–19	5	Reg. Pref.	8th	
2019–20	5	Reg. Pref.	5th	
2020–21	5	Reg. Pref.	12th	
2021–22	6	Reg. Pref.	5th	
2022–23	6	Reg. Pref.	8th	
2023–24	6	Lliga Com.	11th	

Season	Tier	Division	Place	Copa del Rey
2024–25	6	Lliga Com.	8th	
2025–26	6	Lliga Com.	14th	
2026–27	7	1ª FFCV		

- 13 seasons in Tercera División
