= Alcañiz CF =

Alcañiz
- Full name: Alcañiz Club de Fútbol
- Founded: 1923
- Ground: Ciudad Deportiva Santa María, Alcañiz, Aragón, Spain
- Capacity: 2,800
- Chairman: Concha Tello
- Manager: Francisco Román
- League: Regional Preferente – Group 2
- 2024–25: Regional Preferente – Group 2, 4th of 18
Home colours	Away colours

Alcañiz Club de Fútbol is a Spanish football team based in Alcañiz, in the autonomous community of Aragón. Founded in 1923, it plays in Regional Preferente – Group 2, holding home matches at Ciudad Deportiva Santa María, with a 2,800-seat capacity.

== Season to season ==
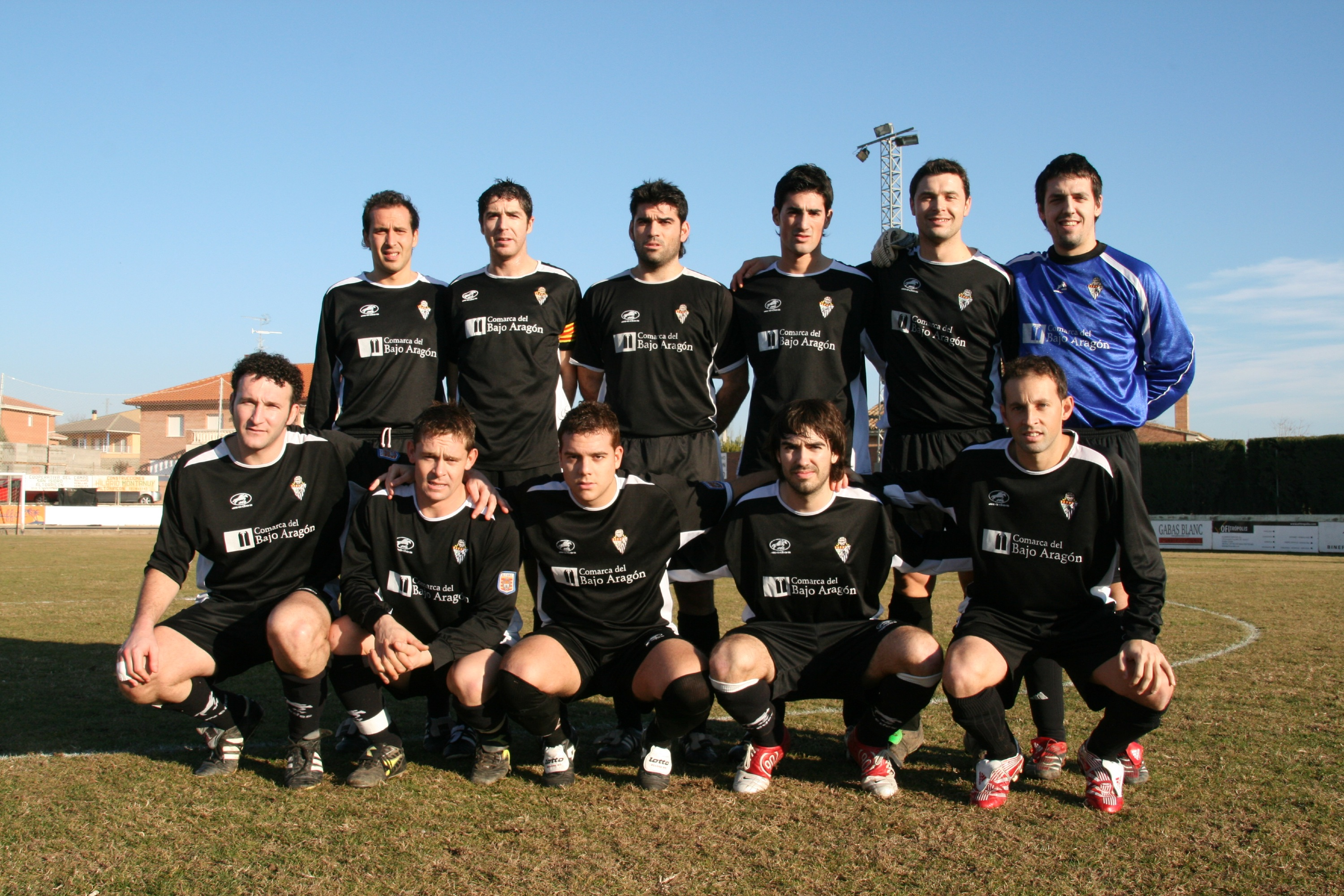
Alcañiz CF 2008

Season	Tier	Division	Place	Copa del Rey
1948–49	4	1ª Reg.	6th	
1949–50	4	1ª Reg.	7th	
1950–51	4	1ª Reg.	6th	
1951–52	4	1ª Reg.	11th	
1952–1956	DNP			
1956–57	5	2ª Reg.	1st	
1957–58	4	1ª Reg.	4th	
1958–59	4	1ª Reg.	3rd	
1959–60	4	1ª Reg.	2nd	
1960–61	3	3ª	6th	
1961–62	3	3ª	5th	
1962–63	3	3ª	15th	
1963–64	3	3ª	12th	
1964–65	3	3ª	16th	
1965–66	3	3ª	(R)	
1966–67	DNP			
1967–68	5	2ª Reg.	2nd	
1968–69	5	1ª Reg.	10th	
1969–70	5	1ª Reg.	12th	
1970–71	5	1ª Reg.	14th	

Season	Tier	Division	Place	Copa del Rey
1971–72	5	1ª Reg.	12th	
1972–73	5	1ª Reg.	10th	
1973–74	5	1ª Reg.	2nd	
1974–75	4	Reg. Pref.	11th	
1975–76	4	Reg. Pref.	11th	
1976–77	4	Reg. Pref.	16th	
1977–78	5	Reg. Pref.	5th	
1978–79	5	Reg. Pref.	15th	
1979–80	5	Reg. Pref.	16th	
1980–81	5	Reg. Pref.	3rd	
1981–82	5	Reg. Pref.	3rd	
1982–83	5	Reg. Pref.	3rd	
1983–84	5	Reg. Pref.	3rd	
1984–85	5	Reg. Pref.	6th	
1985–86	5	Reg. Pref.	2nd	
1986–87	4	3ª	15th	
1987–88	4	3ª	5th	
1988–89	4	3ª	8th	
1989–90	4	3ª	4th	
1990–91	4	3ª	17th	First round

Season	Tier	Division	Place	Copa del Rey
1991–92	5	Reg. Pref.	2nd	
1992–93	4	3ª	17th	
1993–94	4	3ª	15th	
1994–95	4	3ª	14th	
1995–96	4	3ª	11th	
1996–97	4	3ª	11th	
1997–98	4	3ª	12th	
1998–99	4	3ª	8th	
1999–2000	4	3ª	19th	
2000–01	5	Reg. Pref.	1st	
2001–02	4	3ª	7th	
2002–03	4	3ª	19th	
2003–04	5	Reg. Pref.	2nd	
2004–05	4	3ª	10th	
2005–06	4	3ª	9th	
2006–07	4	3ª	17th	
2007–08	5	Reg. Pref.	2nd	
2008–09	4	3ª	11th	
2009–10	4	3ª	18th	
2010–11	5	Reg. Pref.	9th	

Season	Tier	Division	Place	Copa del Rey
2011–12	5	Reg. Pref.	10th	
2012–13	5	Reg. Pref.	13th	
2013–14	5	Reg. Pref.	12th	
2014–15	5	Reg. Pref.	11th	
2015–16	5	Reg. Pref.	15th	
2016–17	6	1ª Reg.	1st	
2017–18	5	Reg. Pref.	8th	
2018–19	5	Reg. Pref.	5th	
2019–20	5	Reg. Pref.	4th	
2020–21	5	Reg. Pref.	5th	
2021–22	6	Reg. Pref.	10th	
2022–23	6	Reg. Pref.	6th	
2023–24	6	Reg. Pref.	4th	
2024–25	6	Reg. Pref.	4th	
2025–26	6	Reg. Pref.		

- 25 seasons in Tercera División
