= Tomelloso CF (1927) =

Spanish football club

Tomelloso
- Full name: Tomelloso Club de Fútbol
- Founded: 1927
- Dissolved: 1972
- Ground: Estadio Municipal, Tomelloso, Castile-La Mancha, Spain
- Capacity: 5,000
- 1971–72: Segunda Regional Ordinaria Castellana, 14th of 20
Home colours

Tomelloso Club de Fútbol was a Spanish football team based in Tomelloso, in the autonomous community of Castile-La Mancha. Founded in 1927, it played its home games at Estadio Municipal de Tomelloso, which has a capacity of 5,000 seats.

Founded as Tomelloso Foot-ball Club, the club changed name to Tomelloso Club de Fútbol in 1940. Back to an active status in 1944, the club played in 15 Tercera División seasons before folding in 1972. In 1979, Atlético Tomelloso was founded.

== Season to season ==
Season	Tier	Division	Place	Copa del Rey
1944–45	4	1ª Reg.		
1945–46	3	3ª	5th	
1946–47	3	3ª	2nd	
1947–48	3	3ª	9th	Fifth round
1948–49	3	3ª	7th	Fourth round
1949–50	3	3ª	7th	
1950–51	3	3ª	7th	
1951–52	3	3ª	6th	
1952–53	3	3ª	(R)	
1953–54	4	1ª Reg.	8th	
1954–55	4	1ª Reg.	7th	
1955–56	DNP			
1956–57	DNP			
1957–58	4	1ª Reg.	5th	

Season	Tier	Division	Place	Copa del Rey
1958–59	4	1ª Reg.	3rd	
1959–60	4	1ª Reg.	1st	
1960–61	4	1ª Reg.	1st	
1961–62	3	3ª	8th	
1962–63	3	3ª	4th	
1963–64	3	3ª	10th	
1964–65	3	3ª	4th	
1965–66	3	3ª	5th	
1966–67	3	3ª	6th	
1967–68	3	3ª	9th	
1968–69	3	3ª	20th	
1969–70	4	1ª Reg.	14th	
1970–71	5	2ª Reg.	16th	
1971–72	5	2ª Reg.	14th	

- 16 seasons in Tercera División
