= Club Arsenal de El Ferrol =

Defunct Spanish football club

Arsenal Ferrol
- Full name: Club Arsenal de El Ferrol
- Founded: 1936
- Dissolved: 1993
- Ground: Ferrol, Galicia, Spain
- 1992–93: Primera Regional de Galicia – Group 1, 16th of 20 (relegated)

Club Arsenal de El Ferrol, also known as Ferrol Atlético, was a Spanish football team based in Ferrol, in the autonomous community of Galicia. Founded in 1936 as Club Galicia de El Ferrol, the team disappeared in 1993.

== History ==
The origins of the team can be found in 1936, when Club Galicia de El Ferrol was born. In 1947, it was renamed Arsenal Club de Fútbol de El Ferrol and after, in 1956, Club Arsenal de El Ferrol.

In 1981, it became the reserve team of Racing de Ferrol, being thus renamed Ferrol Atlético. At the end of the 1992–93 season, the team was disbanded.

=== Club names ===
- Club Galicia de El Ferrol – (1936–1947)
- Arsenal Club de Fútbol de El Ferrol – (1947–1956)
- Club Arsenal de El Ferrol – (1956–1981)
- Ferrol Atlético – (1981–1993)

== Season to season ==
- As an independent club

Season	Tier	Division	Place	Copa del Rey
1940–41	4	Serie A	2nd	
1941–42	3	Serie A	3rd	
1942–43	3	Serie A	5th	
1943–44	4	Serie A		
1944–45	3	3ª	7th	
1945–46	3	3ª	10th	
1946–47	3	3ª	8th	
1947–48	3	3ª	9th	Second round
1948–49	3	3ª	13th	First round
1949–50	3	3ª	14th	
1950–51	3	3ª	12th	
1951–52	3	3ª	8th	
1952–53	3	3ª	4th	
1953–54	3	3ª	9th	
1954–55	3	3ª	1st	
1955–56	3	3ª	3rd	
1956–57	3	3ª	6th	
1957–58	3	3ª	8th	
1958–59	3	3ª	7th	
1959–60	3	3ª	2nd	

Season	Tier	Division	Place	Copa del Rey
1960–61	3	3ª	6th	
1961–62	3	3ª	6th	
1962–63	3	3ª	10th	
1963–64	3	3ª	5th	
1964–65	3	3ª	14th	
1965–66	4	Serie A	1st	
1966–67	3	3ª	9th	
1967–68	3	3ª	12th	
1968–69	4	Serie A	2nd	
1969–70	4	Serie A	2nd	
1970–71	4	Serie A	9th	
1971–72	4	Serie A	3rd	
1972–73	4	Serie A	7th	
1973–74	4	Serie A	10th	
1974–75	4	Serie A	10th	
1975–76	4	Serie A	14th	
1976–77	4	Serie A	17th	
1977–78	5	Serie A	2nd	
1978–79	5	Reg. Pref.	9th	
1979–80	5	Reg. Pref.	19th	

Season	Tier	Division	Place	Copa del Rey
1980–81	6	1ª Reg.	5th	

- As Ferrol Atlético (Racing de Ferrol's reserve team)

Season	Tier	Division	Place	Copa del Rey
1981–82	5	Reg. Pref.	5th	
1982–83	5	Reg. Pref.	14th	
1983–84	5	Reg. Pref.	15th	
1984–85	5	Reg. Pref.	16th	
1985–86	5	Reg. Pref.	18th	
1986–87	6	1ª Reg.	9th	

Season	Tier	Division	Place	Copa del Rey
1987–88	6	1ª Reg.	4th	
1988–89	6	1ª Reg.	2nd	
1989–90	6	1ª Reg.	3rd	
1990–91	6	1ª Reg.	2nd	
1991–92	5	Reg. Pref.	16th	
1992–93	6	1ª Reg.	16th	

- 23 seasons in Tercera División
