= CD Ourense B =

Spanish football club

Ourense B
- Full name: Club Deportivo Ourense "B", S.A.D.
- Nickname: Atlético Ourense
- Founded: 1953 (as AD Couto)
- Dissolved: 2014
- Ground: Os Remedios, Ourense, Galicia (Spain), Spain
- Chairman: (Spain) Juan Pérez Gómez
- Manager: (Spain) Antonio Dacosta
- 2013–14: Preferente Autónomica – South, 15th of 20
Home colours	Away colours

Club Deportivo Ourense "B", S.A.D. was a football team based in Ourense in the autonomous community of Galicia. They were the reserve team of CD Ourense. Founded in 1953, the team last played in Preferente Autonómica. The club's home ground was Estadio Os Remedios.

== History ==
Founded in 1953 as Agrupación Deportiva Couto, the club was renamed to Club Atlético Orense in 1996 and began an affiliation with CD Orense. After changing name to Club Deportivo Ourense B in 1992, Ourense and Ourense B were dissolved in 2014.

== Season to season ==
- As an independent club

Season	Tier	Division	Place	Copa del Rey
1953–1956	—	Regional	—	
1956–57	4	Serie A	7th	
1957–58	4	Serie A	4th	
1958–59	4	Serie A	3rd	
1959–60	4	Serie A	8th	
1960–61	4	Serie A	1st	
1961–62	3	3ª	5th	
1962–63	3	3ª	3rd	
1963–64	3	3ª	8th	
1964–65	3	3ª	12th	
1965–66	3	3ª	3rd	
1966–67	3	3ª	4th	
1967–68	3	3ª	7th	
1968–69	3	3ª	18th	
1969–70	3	3ª	16th	First round
1970–71	4	Serie A	5th	
1971–72	4	Serie A	13th	
1972–73	4	Serie A	3rd	
1973–74	4	Serie A	7th	

Season	Tier	Division	Place	Copa del Rey
1974–75	4	Serie A	11th	
1975–76	4	Serie A	11th	
1976–77	4	Serie A	9th	
1977–78	5	Serie A	8th	
1978–79	5	Reg. Pref.	19th	
1979–80	6	1ª Reg.	11th	
1980–81	6	1ª Reg.	13th	
1981–82	6	1ª Reg.	2nd	
1982–83	6	1ª Reg.	2nd	
1983–84	5	Reg. Pref.	8th	
1984–85	5	Reg. Pref.	7th	
1985–86	5	Reg. Pref.	3rd	
1986–87	4	3ª	13th	
1987–88	4	3ª	12th	
1988–89	4	3ª	20th	
1989–90	5	Reg. Pref.	6th	
1990–91	5	Reg. Pref.	8th	
1991–92	5	Reg. Pref.	16th	

- As the reserve team of CD Ourense

Season	Tier	Division	Place
1992–93	5	Reg. Pref.	9th
1993–94	5	Reg. Pref.	18th
1994–95	6	1ª Reg.	2nd
1995–96	5	Reg. Pref.	3rd
1996–97	5	Reg. Pref.	4th
1997–98	5	Reg. Pref.	1st
1998–99	4	3ª	11th
1999–2000	4	3ª	20th
2000–01	5	Reg. Pref.	16th
2001–02	5	Reg. Pref.	18th
2002–03	6	1ª Reg.	11th

Season	Tier	Division	Place
2003–04	6	1ª Reg.	1st
2004–05	5	Reg. Pref.	6th
2005–06	5	Reg. Pref.	1st
2006–07	4	3ª	11th
2007–08	4	3ª	19th
2008–09	5	Pref. Aut.	16th
2009–10	6	1ª Aut.	2nd
2010–11	5	Pref. Aut.	13th
2011–12	5	Pref. Aut.	20th
2012–13	6	1ª Aut.	2nd
2013–14	5	Pref. Aut.	15th

- 16 seasons in Tercera División
