= 1964–65 Tercera División =

Tercera División
- Season: 1964–65

The 1964–65 Tercera División (3rd level of the Spanish football league system) season was the 29th since its establishment.

== League tables ==
=== Group I ===
Pos	Team	Pld	W	D	L	GF	GA	GD	Pts
1	Racing de Ferrol	30	25	2	3	73	18	+55	52
2	Compostela	30	22	4	4	85	30	+55	48
3	Lugo	30	18	5	7	61	26	+35	41
4	Fabril	30	17	5	8	51	30	+21	39
5	Gran Peña	30	13	4	13	43	43	0	30
6	Alondras	30	12	4	14	49	62	−13	28
7	Arenteiro	30	8	9	13	34	56	−22	25
8	Choco	30	9	7	14	46	56	−10	25
9	Arosa	30	9	7	14	30	45	−15	25
10	Coruxo	30	10	4	16	38	55	−17	24
11	Lemos	30	10	4	16	29	48	−19	24
12	Arsenal	30	8	8	14	34	36	−2	24
13	Turista	30	9	6	15	32	49	−17	24
14	Couto	30	10	4	16	38	57	−19	24
15	Calvo Sotelo	30	9	6	15	47	63	−16	24
16	Foz	30	10	3	17	47	63	−16	23

=== Group II ===
Pos	Team	Pld	W	D	L	GF	GA	GD	Pts
1	Real Avilés	30	24	4	2	74	15	+59	52
2	Praviano	30	18	7	5	57	32	+25	43
3	Caudal	30	19	5	6	62	28	+34	43
4	La Camocha	30	15	7	8	60	42	+18	37
5	San Martín	30	14	5	11	46	32	+14	33
6	Vetusta	30	15	2	13	58	43	+15	32
7	Llaranes	30	13	4	13	50	43	+7	30
8	Luarca	30	10	10	10	35	44	−9	30
9	Turón	30	11	8	11	49	48	+1	30
10	Candás	30	9	9	12	32	44	−12	27
11	Siero	30	8	9	13	40	53	−13	25
12	Lieres	30	11	2	17	55	72	−17	24
13	Pelayo	30	10	4	16	41	55	−14	24
14	Santa Marina	30	8	5	17	37	69	−32	21
15	Santiago de Aller	30	7	5	18	34	65	−31	19
16	San Esteban	30	4	2	24	30	75	−45	8 (Note: 2 points deducted)

=== Group III ===
Pos	Team	Pld	W	D	L	GF	GA	GD	Pts
1	Gimnástica de Torrelavega	30	20	4	6	87	34	+53	44
2	Sestao	30	18	4	8	53	37	+16	40
3	Unión Club	30	12	11	7	47	38	+9	35
4	Portugalete	30	14	5	11	48	43	+5	33
5	Arenas de Getxo	30	15	2	13	47	34	+13	32
6	Laredo	30	12	8	10	38	47	−9	32
7	Amorebieta	30	13	4	13	54	44	+10	30
8	Rayo Cantabria	30	11	7	12	43	49	−6	29
9	Santurtzi	30	10	9	11	44	45	−1	29
10	Baskonia	30	12	5	13	46	57	−11	29
11	Getxo	30	12	5	13	46	48	−2	29
12	Erandio	30	12	3	15	54	60	−6	27
13	San Vicente	30	11	5	14	47	55	−8	27
14	Guarnizo	30	8	8	14	39	60	−21	24
15	Deusto	30	9	6	15	44	63	−19	24
16	Villosa	30	5	6	19	34	57	−23	16

=== Group IV ===
Pos	Team	Pld	W	D	L	GF	GA	GD	Pts
1	Alavés	30	20	7	3	65	31	+34	47
2	Eibar	30	21	4	5	75	21	+54	46
3	Euskalduna	30	17	6	7	49	30	+19	40
4	Logroñés	30	12	9	9	57	41	+16	33
5	Mutriku	30	14	5	11	48	48	0	33
6	Oberena	30	13	5	12	48	35	+13	31
7	Touring	30	12	5	13	49	61	−12	29
8	Chantrea	30	12	5	13	47	42	+5	29
9	Alfaro	30	12	3	15	47	55	−8	27
10	Mirandés	30	11	5	14	44	54	−10	27
11	Mondragón	30	11	4	15	63	68	−5	26
12	Calahorra	30	10	6	14	36	53	−17	26
13	San Sebastián	30	9	8	13	48	46	+2	26
14	Aurrerá Ondarroa	30	10	3	17	34	53	−19	23
15	Beasain	30	10	3	17	35	64	−29	23
16	Azkoyen	30	4	6	20	28	71	−43	14

=== Group V ===
Pos	Team	Pld	W	D	L	GF	GA	GD	Pts
1	Calvo Sotelo Andorra	30	23	3	4	107	18	+89	49
2	Huesca	30	18	8	4	64	28	+36	44
3	Numancia	30	17	6	7	61	32	+29	40
4	Barbastro	30	18	3	9	43	38	+5	39
5	Tarazona	30	15	4	11	66	40	+26	34
6	Calatayud	30	14	6	10	57	45	+12	34
7	Aragón	30	15	4	11	40	32	+8	34
8	Mequinenza	30	15	3	12	64	58	+6	33
9	Caspe	30	11	8	11	48	47	+1	30
10	Arenas	30	11	2	17	39	66	−27	24
11	Atlético Monzón	30	9	6	15	38	58	−20	24
12	Ejea	30	9	5	16	46	54	−8	23
13	Calvo Sotelo Escatrón	30	8	5	17	33	63	−30	21
14	Teruel	30	6	9	15	34	62	−28	21
15	Renfe	30	5	7	18	29	60	−31	17
16	Alcañiz	30	3	7	20	24	92	−68	13

=== Group VI-VII ===
Pos	Team	Pld	W	D	L	GF	GA	GD	Pts
1	Condal	38	19	10	9	86	44	+42	48
2	Lleida	38	18	11	9	66	38	+28	47
3	Gimnàstic de Tarragona	38	20	6	12	71	50	+21	46
4	Sants	38	18	9	11	56	38	+18	45
5	Balaguer	38	17	11	10	59	42	+17	45
6	Calella	38	19	4	15	52	49	+3	42
7	Girona	38	17	7	14	64	48	+16	41
8	Reus	38	16	9	13	67	47	+20	41
9	Granollers	38	14	12	12	66	60	+6	40
10	Terrassa	38	15	9	14	54	57	−3	39
11	Sant Andreu	38	15	9	14	65	60	+5	39
12	Tortosa	38	16	7	15	53	46	+7	39
13	Vic	38	14	9	15	59	54	+5	37
14	Mataró	38	14	9	15	45	46	−1	37
15	Manresa	38	14	7	17	43	61	−18	35
16	Palafrugell	38	15	3	20	57	70	−13	33
17	Fabra y Coats	38	12	8	18	50	68	−18	32
18	Olot	38	12	8	18	61	69	−8	32
19	Vilafranca	38	11	8	19	43	80	−37	30
20	Atlètic Gironella	38	3	6	29	29	119	−90	12

=== Group VIII ===
Pos	Team	Pld	W	D	L	GF	GA	GD	Pts
1	Atlético Baleares	16	11	3	2	36	8	+28	25
2	Menorca	16	12	1	3	34	8	+26	25
3	Soledad	16	8	3	5	30	19	+11	19
4	Atlètic de Ciutadella	16	7	1	8	24	25	−1	15
5	Mahón	16	7	1	8	32	20	+12	15
6	Ibiza	16	5	3	8	15	29	−14	13
7	Manacor	16	6	1	9	17	25	−8	13
8	Poblense	16	4	3	9	14	29	−15	11
9	Alaior	16	1	6	9	6	45	−39	8

=== Group IX ===
Pos	Team	Pld	W	D	L	GF	GA	GD	Pts
1	Castellón	30	23	4	3	80	18	+62	50
2	Gandía	30	14	8	8	52	43	+9	36
3	Alcoyano	30	14	8	8	43	33	+10	36
4	Sueca	30	15	5	10	55	40	+15	35
5	Olímpic de Xàtiva	30	14	5	11	55	40	+15	33
6	Carcaixent	30	14	4	12	55	50	+5	32
7	Acero	30	13	6	11	39	43	−4	32
8	Burriana	30	11	7	12	49	44	+5	29
9	Onda	30	11	7	12	25	34	−9	29
10	Atlético Saguntino	30	12	2	16	36	51	−15	26
11	Requena	30	10	6	14	39	50	−11	26
12	Atlético Levante	30	8	9	13	30	36	−6	25
13	Oliva	30	9	7	14	39	50	−11	25
14	Alzira	30	8	9	13	35	47	−12	25
15	Buñol	30	9	7	14	32	54	−22	25
16	Canals	30	6	4	20	34	65	−31	16

=== Group X ===
Pos	Team	Pld	W	D	L	GF	GA	GD	Pts
1	Albacete	30	19	9	2	68	24	+44	47
2	Cartagena	30	18	6	6	65	21	+44	42
3	Imperial	30	18	5	7	58	30	+28	41
4	Eldense	30	16	6	8	62	31	+31	38
5	Alicante	30	14	5	11	49	35	+14	33
6	Jumilla	30	13	5	12	38	45	−7	31
7	Rayo Ibense	30	11	8	11	47	53	−6	30
8	Ilicitano	30	12	6	12	49	52	−3	30
9	La Roda	30	12	3	15	42	59	−17	27
10	Atlético Cartagena	30	10	4	16	43	52	−9	24
11	Cieza	30	11	2	17	40	55	−15	24
12	Lorca	30	10	4	16	37	70	−33	24
13	Orihuela	30	9	5	16	39	56	−17	23
14	Almansa	30	9	5	16	41	48	−7	23
15	Aspense	30	8	7	15	36	57	−21	23
16	Monóvar	30	7	6	17	40	66	−26	20

=== Group XI ===
Pos	Team	Pld	W	D	L	GF	GA	GD	Pts
1	Real Jaén	30	21	2	7	52	24	+28	44
2	Almería	30	17	6	7	43	25	+18	40
3	Atlético Marbella	30	14	9	7	49	36	+13	37
4	Atlético Malagueño	30	14	7	9	51	27	+24	35
5	Iliturgi	30	14	4	12	46	46	0	32
6	Fuengirola	30	12	7	11	48	37	+11	31
7	Recreativo de Granada	30	12	6	12	40	41	−1	30
8	Antequerano	30	13	4	13	42	48	−6	30
9	Adra	30	13	3	14	43	46	−3	29
10	Ronda	30	11	5	14	42	59	−17	27
11	Atlético Cordobés	30	10	7	13	38	45	−7	27
12	Juventud de Torremolinos	30	11	4	15	48	50	−2	26
13	Imperio de Ceuta	30	10	6	14	42	50	−8	26
14	Juan Sebastián Elcano	30	11	3	16	38	45	−7	25
15	Atlético Prieguense	30	8	7	15	31	46	−15	23
16	Puerto Malagueño	30	6	6	18	26	54	−28	18

=== Group XII ===
Pos	Team	Pld	W	D	L	GF	GA	GD	Pts
1	Xerez	28	21	3	4	65	16	+49	45
2	Balompédica Linense	28	19	6	3	64	26	+38	44
3	Jerez Industrial	28	20	3	5	65	22	+43	43
4	Portuense	28	17	3	8	49	31	+18	37
5	Sevilla Atlético	28	15	7	6	62	36	+26	37
6	Triana	28	13	8	7	47	28	+19	34
7	Atlético Onubense	28	13	7	8	49	28	+21	33
8	San Fernando	28	9	5	14	51	55	−4	23
9	Balón de Cádiz	28	6	8	14	36	55	−19	20
10	Puerto Real	28	6	7	15	39	64	−25	19
11	Riotinto	28	7	5	16	25	63	−38	19
12	Coria	28	8	3	17	34	60	−26	19
13	Utrera	28	4	8	16	30	64	−34	16
14	Ayamonte	28	5	6	17	30	53	−23	16
15	Chiclanero	28	5	5	18	35	80	−45	15
16	Écija (Note: Team withdrawn from the competition)	0	-	-	-	-	-	—	0

=== Group XIII ===
Pos	Team	Pld	W	D	L	GF	GA	GD	Pts
1	Salamanca	30	24	4	2	75	17	+58	52
2	Béjar Industrial	30	22	3	5	87	23	+64	47
3	Ponferradina	30	17	7	6	81	37	+44	41
4	Hullera Vasco-Leonesa	30	16	6	8	56	31	+25	38
5	Juventud	30	15	3	12	49	36	+13	33
6	Cultural Leonesa	30	12	7	11	43	39	+4	31
7	La Bañeza	30	12	7	11	43	49	−6	31
8	Arandina	30	10	7	13	43	55	−12	27
9	Hulleras	30	9	8	13	28	49	−21	26
10	Gimnástica Medinense	30	11	4	15	37	50	−13	26
11	Ciudad Rodrigo	30	9	7	14	48	47	+1	25
12	Júpiter Leonés	30	10	5	15	35	46	−11	25
13	Europa Delicias	30	7	9	14	48	50	−2	23
14	Astorga	30	6	8	16	36	69	−33	20
15	Peñaranda	30	8	2	20	35	114	−79	18
16	Salmantino	30	5	7	18	26	58	−32	17

=== Group XIV ===
Pos	Team	Pld	W	D	L	GF	GA	GD	Pts
1	Rayo Vallecano	30	26	4	0	102	14	+88	56
2	Talavera	30	21	5	4	60	23	+37	47
3	Plus Ultra	30	18	6	6	77	27	+50	42
4	Toledo	30	15	6	9	53	38	+15	36
5	Gimnástica Segoviana	30	15	4	11	58	38	+20	34
6	Conquense	30	13	7	10	43	41	+2	33
7	Real Ávila	30	13	5	12	49	41	+8	31
8	Guadalajara	30	11	9	10	44	36	+8	31
9	Carabanchel	30	12	6	12	45	47	−2	30
10	Femsa	30	13	3	14	45	48	−3	29
11	Boetticher y Navarro	30	10	5	15	48	64	−16	25
12	Colonia Moscardó	30	8	5	17	36	59	−23	21
13	Getafe	30	6	6	18	27	66	−39	18
14	Alcalá	30	7	4	19	30	61	−31	18
15	Santa Bárbara	30	6	4	20	46	99	−53	16
16	Leganés	30	4	5	21	25	86	−61	13

=== Group XV ===
Pos	Team	Pld	W	D	L	GF	GA	GD	Pts
1	Badajoz	30	17	9	4	69	26	+43	43
2	Cacereño	30	17	7	6	74	22	+52	41
3	Villarrobledo	30	17	5	8	57	28	+29	39
4	Tomelloso	30	15	6	9	43	28	+15	36
5	Díter Zafra	30	15	5	10	65	36	+29	35
6	Socuéllamos	30	15	4	11	55	51	+4	34
7	Manchego	30	12	9	9	50	37	+13	33
8	Extremadura	30	14	4	12	46	36	+10	32
9	Emeritense	30	11	7	12	41	53	−12	29
10	Plasencia	30	12	5	13	45	41	+4	29
11	Don Benito	30	10	9	11	37	39	−2	29
12	Madrileño	30	7	15	8	39	37	+2	29
13	Alcázar	30	9	6	15	46	56	−10	24
14	Bolañego	30	8	3	19	26	74	−48	19
15	Morante	30	5	5	20	29	79	−50	15
16	Pedro Muñoz	30	4	5	21	20	99	−79	13

== Promotion playoff ==
=== Champions ===
==== First round ====
Team 1	Agg.	Team 2	1st leg	2nd leg
Real Avilés	2–11	Condal	2–3	0–8
Real Jaén	2–1	Castellón	2–0	0–1
Alavés	2–9	Lleida	1–2	1–7
Albacete	1–2	Calvo Sotelo Andorra	1–2	0–0
Rayo Vallecano	5–4	Xerez	4–2	1–2
Salamanca	3–3	Racing de Ferrol	2–2	1–1
Atlético Baleares	1–3	Badajoz	1–1	0–2

===== Tiebreaker =====
Team 1	Score	Team 2
Salamanca	2–3	Racing de Ferrol

==== Final Round ====
Team 1	Agg.	Team 2	1st leg	2nd leg
Condal	2–1	Real Jaén	0–1	2–0
Lleida	5–3	Calvo Sotelo Andorra	2–1	3–2
Rayo Vallecano	4–0	Racing de Ferrol	3–0	1–0
Gimnástica de Torrelavega	3–3	Badajoz	2–0	1–3

===== Tiebreaker =====
Team 1	Score	Team 2
Gimnástica de Torrelavega	0–2	Badajoz

=== Runners-up ===
==== First round ====
Team 1	Agg.	Team 2	1st leg	2nd leg
Huesca	1–1	Praviano	0–1	1–0
Talavera	0–6	Eibar	0–1	0–5
Sestao	4–3	Gandía	4–0	0–3
Cartagena	2–0	Cacereño	2–0	0–0
Almería	2–2	Sants	2–0	0–2
Balompédica Linense	6–2	Menorca	4–1	2–1
Compostela	1–1	Béjar Industrial	1–0	0–1

===== Tiebreakers =====
Team 1	Score	Team 2
Huesca	1–0	Praviano
Almería	1–0	Sants
Compostela	1–3	Béjar Industrial

==== Second round ====
Team 1	Agg.	Team 2	1st leg	2nd leg
Huesca	1–7	Eibar	0–3	1–4
Gimnàstic de Tarragona	3–2	Sestao	3–0	0–2
Cartagena	1–0	Almería	1–0	0–0
Balompédica Linense	1–2	Béjar Industrial	1–1	0–1

==== Final Round ====
Team 1	Agg.	Team 2	1st leg	2nd leg
Gimnàstic de Tarragona	3–5	Europa	2–4	1–1
Cartagena	4–5	Badalona	3–1	1–4
Béjar Industrial	1–1	Constància	1–0	0–1
Eibar	2–2	Cádiz	2–0	0–2

===== Tiebreakers =====
Team 1	Score	Team 2
Béjar Industrial	1–2	Constància
Eibar	1–4	Cádiz

== Season records ==
- Most wins: 26, Rayo Vallecano.
- Most draws: 15, Madrileño.
- Most losses: 29, Atlètic Gironella.
- Most goals for: 107, Calvo Sotelo Andorra.
- Most goals against: 119, Atlètic Gironella.
- Most points: 56, Rayo Vallecano.
- Fewest wins: 1, Alaior.
- Fewest draws: 1, Menorca, Atlètic de Ciutadella, Mahón and Manacor.
- Fewest losses: 0, Rayo Vallecano.
- Fewest goals for: 6, Alaior.
- Fewest goals against: 8, Atlético Baleares and Menorca.
- Fewest points: 8, San Esteban and Alaior.
