= CD Peñaranda de Bracamonte =

Spanish football team

Peñaranda de Bracamonte
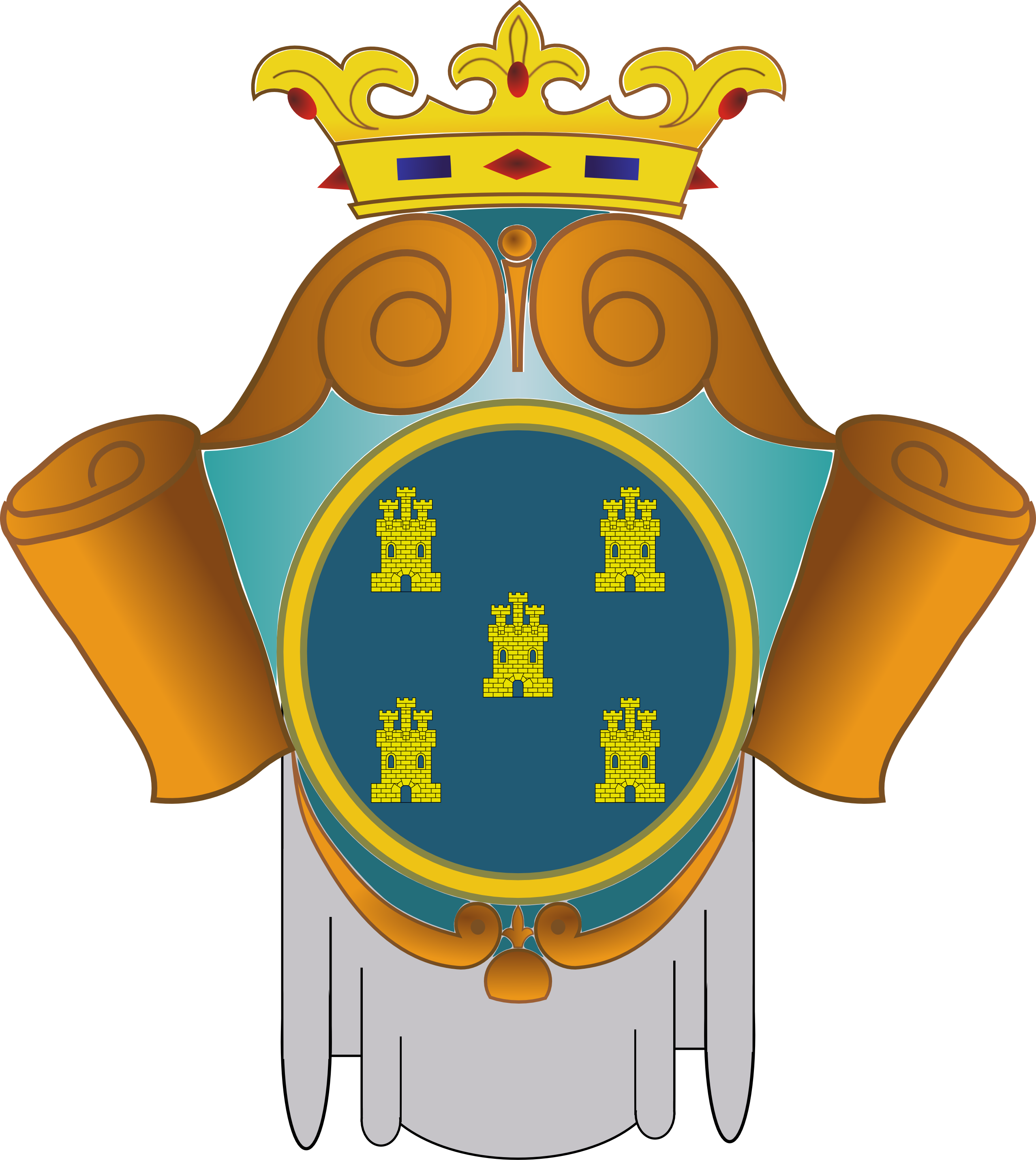
- Full name: Club Deportivo Peñaranda de Bracamonte
- Founded: 4 March 1956; 70 years ago
- Ground: Luis García García, Peñaranda de Bracamonte, Castile and León, Spain
- Capacity: 1,200
- President: Isidro Rodríguez Plaza
- Manager: José Crespo
- League: Primera Provincial – Salamanca
- 2025–26: Primera Provincial – Salamanca, 4th of 14
Home colours	Away colours

Club Deportivo Peñaranda de Bracamonte is a football team based in Peñaranda de Bracamonte, in the autonomous community of Castile and León. Founded in 1956, they play in Primera Provincial – Salamanca, holding home matches at the Campo de Fútbol Municipal Luis García García, with a capacity of 1,200 spectators.

== History ==
Founded on 4 March 1956, Peñaranda achieved a first-ever promotion to Tercera División in 1961. Relegated after four consecutive seasons in the division, the club ceased activities in 1989, only returning in 1998 under the name of Agrupación Deportiva Peñaranda de Bracamonte.

In 2004, Peñaranda merged with RCD Ribert and returned to the original name of Club Deportivo Peñaranda de Bracamonte.

== Season to season ==
Season	Tier	Division	Place	Copa del Rey
1956–1961	—	Regional	—	
1961–62	3	3ª	14th	
1962–63	3	3ª	14th	
1963–64	3	3ª	12th	
1964–65	3	3ª	15th	
1965–66	4	1ª Reg.	3rd	
1966–67	4	1ª Reg.		
1967–68	4	1ª Reg.		
1968–69	4	1ª Reg.	1st	
1969–70	4	1ª Reg.	(R)	
1970–71	5	2ª Reg.	5th	
1971–72	5	1ª Reg.		
1972–73	5	1ª Reg.		
1973–74	5	1ª Reg.		
1974–75	4	Reg. Pref.	15th	
1975–76	5	1ª Reg.		
1976–77	4	Reg. Pref.	14th	
1977–78	5	Reg. Pref.	17th	
1978–79	6	1ª Reg.		
1979–80	6	1ª Reg.	6th	

Season	Tier	Division	Place	Copa del Rey
1980–81	6	1ª Reg.	3rd	
1981–82	5	Reg. Pref.	4th	
1982–83	5	Reg. Pref.	9th	
1983–84	5	Reg. Pref.	11th	
1984–85	5	Reg. Pref.	10th	
1985–86	6	1ª Reg.		
1986–87	5	Reg. Pref.	17th	
1987–88	6	1ª Reg.	1st	
1988–89	5	Reg. Pref.	17th	
1989–1998	DNP			
1998–99	6	1ª Prov.	4th	
1999–2000	6	1ª Prov.	3rd	
2000–01	6	1ª Prov.	4th	
2001–02	6	1ª Prov.	1st	
2002–03	5	1ª Reg.	15th	
2003–04	DNP			
2004–05	6	1ª Prov.	4th	
2005–06	6	1ª Prov.	5th	
2006–07	6	1ª Prov.	7th	
2007–08	6	1ª Prov.	8th	

Season	Tier	Division	Place	Copa del Rey
2008–09	6	1ª Prov.	9th	
2009–10	6	1ª Prov.	2nd	
2010–11	6	1ª Prov.	2nd	
2011–12	5	1ª Reg.	11th	
2012–13	5	1ª Reg.	8th	
2013–14	5	1ª Reg.	10th	
2014–15	5	1ª Reg.	15th	
2015–16	5	1ª Reg.	10th	
2016–17	5	1ª Reg.	9th	
2017–18	5	1ª Reg.	7th	
2018–19	5	1ª Reg.	2nd	
2019–20	5	1ª Reg.	1st	
2020–21	4	3ª	10th / 10th	
2021–22	6	1ª Reg.	12th	
2022–23	6	1ª Reg.	17th	
2023–24	7	1ª Prov.	1st	
2024–25	6	1ª Reg.	15th	
2025–26	7	1ª Prov.	4th	

- 5 seasons in Tercera División
