= AD Adra =

Spanish football team

Adra
- Full name: Asociación Deportiva Adra
- Founded: 1975
- Dissolved: 2011
- Ground: Estadio Miramar, Adra, Andalusia, Spain
- 2010–11: 3ª – Group 9, withdrew
Home colours	Away colours

Asociación Deportiva Adra was a Spanish football team based in Adra, in the autonomous community of Andalusia. Founded in 1975, the club was dissolved in 2011.

== History ==
Founded in 1975 as a replacement to Adra CF (dissolved in 1970), Adra never played in higher than Tercera División, returning to that level for the last time in 2006. On 26 January 2011 the team withdrew from competition, due to little financial support from the administration.

In 2011, a new club named CD Adra Milenaria was founded, being the heir of AD Adra. That club was renamed CF Adra in the start of the 2020–21 season.

== Season to season ==
Season	Tier	Division	Place	Copa del Rey
1976–77	6	2ª Reg.	2nd	
1977–78	6	1ª Reg.	13th	
1978–79	6	1ª Reg.	3rd	
1979–80	6	1ª Reg.	18th	
1980–81	6	1ª Reg.	2nd	
1981–82	5	Reg. Pref.	15th	
1982–83	6	1ª Reg.	10th	
1983–84	6	1ª Reg.	14th	
1984–85	6	1ª Reg.	1st	
1985–86	5	Reg. Pref.	10th	
1986–87	5	Reg. Pref.	7th	
1987–88	5	Reg. Pref.	1st	
1988–89	5	Reg. Pref.	9th	
1989–90	5	Reg. Pref.	5th	
1990–91	5	Reg. Pref.	1st	
1991–92	4	3ª	9th	
1992–93	4	3ª	11th	
1993–94	4	3ª	12th	

Season	Tier	Division	Place	Copa del Rey
1994–95	4	3ª	14th	
1995–96	4	3ª	20th	
1996–97	5	Reg. Pref.	17th	
1997–98	6	1ª Reg.	2nd	
1998–99	5	Reg. Pref.	14th	
1999–2000	5	Reg. Pref.	15th	
2000–01	6	1ª Reg.	3rd	
2001–02	5	Reg. Pref.	11th	
2002–03	5	Reg. Pref.	2nd	
2003–04	5	Reg. Pref.	2nd	
2004–05	5	1ª And.	4th	
2005–06	5	1ª And.	2nd	
2006–07	4	3ª	6th	
2007–08	4	3ª	16th	
2008–09	4	3ª	15th	
2009–10	4	3ª	13th	
2010–11	4	3ª	(R)	

- 10 seasons in Tercera División
