= 1962–63 Tercera División =

Tercera División
- Season: 1962–63

The 1962–63 Tercera División season was the 27th since its establishment.

== League tables ==
=== Group I ===
Pos	Team	Pld	W	D	L	GF	GA	GD	Pts
1	Racing de Ferrol	30	25	3	2	92	21	+71	53
2	Lugo	30	21	5	4	71	20	+51	47
3	Couto	30	15	6	9	55	37	+18	36
4	Alondras	30	13	8	9	58	42	+16	34
5	Arosa	30	15	4	11	53	47	+6	34
6	Turista	30	13	8	9	41	35	+6	34
7	Bueu	30	12	6	12	39	45	−6	30
8	Fabril	30	12	5	13	39	34	+5	29
9	Lemos	30	10	8	12	40	36	+4	28
10	Arsenal	30	11	5	14	48	42	+6	27
11	Gran Peña	30	11	4	15	46	55	−9	26
12	Marín	30	8	8	14	33	53	−20	24
13	Coruxo	30	8	7	15	33	52	−19	23
14	Foz	30	8	5	17	29	76	−47	21
15	Viveiro	30	6	7	17	25	64	−39	19
16	Zeltia	30	5	5	20	33	76	−43	13 (Note: 2 points deducted)

=== Group II ===
Pos	Team	Pld	W	D	L	GF	GA	GD	Pts
1	Caudal	30	19	6	5	50	23	+27	44
2	Llaranes	30	16	8	6	60	32	+28	40
3	Real Avilés	30	17	3	10	61	30	+31	37
4	Vetusta	30	14	8	8	61	31	+30	36
5	El Entrego	30	16	4	10	44	37	+7	36
6	Siero	30	12	7	11	55	52	+3	31
7	Pelayo	30	12	7	11	46	45	+1	31
8	La Camocha	30	11	9	10	45	34	+11	31
9	Calzada	30	12	7	11	43	47	−4	31
10	Santiago de Aller	30	10	11	9	39	47	−8	31
11	San Martín	30	12	3	15	48	52	−4	27
12	Luarca	30	11	3	16	43	45	−2	25
13	Turón	30	10	5	15	23	41	−18	25
14	Candás	30	9	6	15	32	53	−21	24
15	Marino de Luanco	30	10	3	17	28	47	−19	23
16	Lieres	30	3	2	25	29	91	−62	8

=== Group III ===
Pos	Team	Pld	W	D	L	GF	GA	GD	Pts
1	Barakaldo	30	17	8	5	58	26	+32	42
2	Arenas de Getxo	30	14	11	5	53	28	+25	39
3	Amorebieta	30	15	8	7	76	42	+34	38
4	Santurtzi	30	16	4	10	64	40	+24	36
5	Sestao	30	15	6	9	68	41	+27	36
6	Galdakao	30	15	4	11	44	33	+11	34
7	Rayo Cantabria	30	14	6	10	60	46	+14	34
8	Getxo	30	15	3	12	58	58	0	33
9	Gimnástica de Torrelavega	30	12	8	10	50	46	+4	32
10	Erandio	30	12	5	13	62	55	+7	29
11	Guarnizo	30	9	7	14	46	62	−16	25
12	Naval	30	9	7	14	28	55	−27	25
13	Laredo	30	10	4	16	37	51	−14	24
14	Deusto	30	9	4	17	49	76	−27	22
15	Santoña	30	7	4	19	39	77	−38	18
16	Larramendi	30	5	3	22	28	84	−56	13

=== Group IV ===
Pos	Team	Pld	W	D	L	GF	GA	GD	Pts
1	Eibar	32	23	5	4	78	34	+44	51
2	Real Unión	32	20	6	6	75	32	+43	46
3	Logroñés	32	18	7	7	61	36	+25	43
4	Mondragón	32	18	7	7	76	48	+28	43
5	Mirandés	32	18	6	8	69	41	+28	42
6	Chantrea	32	13	8	11	51	48	+3	34
7	Alfaro	32	14	6	12	50	44	+6	34
8	Touring	32	11	9	12	54	63	−9	31
9	San Sebastián	32	12	7	13	58	49	+9	31
10	Iruña	32	11	8	13	50	51	−1	30
11	Euskalduna	32	11	7	14	49	45	+4	29
12	Tolosa	32	11	4	17	46	70	−24	26
13	Azkoyen	32	10	4	18	38	64	−26	24
14	Beasain	32	9	5	18	44	84	−40	23
15	Villafranca	32	8	7	17	47	71	−24	23
16	Bergara	32	9	5	18	43	61	−18	21 (Note: 2 points deducted)
17	Vitoria	32	2	7	23	30	78	−48	11

=== Group V ===
Pos	Team	Pld	W	D	L	GF	GA	GD	Pts
1	Numancia	28	24	2	2	93	22	+71	50
2	Huesca	28	17	5	6	59	40	+19	39
3	Ejea	28	17	2	9	64	41	+23	36
4	Calatayud	28	16	2	10	61	50	+11	34
5	Tarazona	28	16	2	10	53	44	+9	34
6	Amistad	28	15	3	10	61	42	+19	33
7	Calvo Sotelo Andorra	28	15	2	11	61	33	+28	32
8	Caspe	28	13	2	13	48	50	−2	28
9	Mequinenza	28	10	4	14	57	74	−17	24
10	Teruel	28	10	3	15	46	58	−12	23
11	Atlético de Monzón	28	7	8	13	39	59	−20	22
12	Sabiñánigo	28	8	4	16	49	82	−33	20
13	Barbastro	28	8	4	16	46	52	−6	18 (Note: 2 points deducted)
14	Arenas	28	5	4	19	32	71	−39	14
15	Alcañiz	28	4	3	21	24	75	−51	11

=== Group VI ===
Pos	Team	Pld	W	D	L	GF	GA	GD	Pts
1	Fabra y Coats	30	19	6	5	80	35	+45	44
2	Badalona	30	18	6	6	88	53	+35	42
3	Mataró	30	17	6	7	68	51	+17	40
4	Girona	30	15	6	9	63	46	+17	36
5	Manresa	30	14	7	9	57	37	+20	35
6	Puig-Reig	30	13	9	8	58	47	+11	35
7	Granollers	30	15	4	11	73	62	+11	34
8	Calella	30	13	7	10	60	48	+12	33
9	Terrassa	30	11	6	13	45	48	−3	28
10	Vic	30	13	2	15	74	70	+4	28
11	Atlètic Gironella	30	10	8	12	56	56	0	28
12	Figueres	30	9	8	13	52	63	−11	26
13	Berga	30	9	7	14	52	75	−23	25
14	Gramenet	30	7	9	14	50	83	−33	23
15	Guíxols	30	5	7	18	48	75	−27	17
16	Artiguense	30	1	4	25	34	109	−75	6

=== Group VII ===
Pos	Team	Pld	W	D	L	GF	GA	GD	Pts
1	Europa	30	19	8	3	62	21	+41	46
2	L'Hospitalet	30	15	11	4	68	27	+41	41
3	Condal	30	18	4	8	73	46	+27	40
4	Lleida	30	17	5	8	78	31	+47	39
5	Sant Andreu	30	16	3	11	59	45	+14	35
6	Gimnàstic de Tarragona	30	15	5	10	53	41	+12	35
7	Sants	30	11	9	10	44	40	+4	31
8	Reus	30	13	4	13	43	49	−6	30
9	Vilafranca	30	12	5	13	51	77	−26	29
10	Tortosa	30	10	6	14	52	62	−10	26
11	Vilanova	30	12	1	17	44	62	−18	25
12	Iberia	30	9	6	15	51	58	−7	24
13	Igualada	30	10	4	16	53	75	−22	24
14	Martinenc	30	7	6	17	41	72	−31	20
15	Poble Sec	30	6	7	17	41	80	−39	19
16	Balaguer	30	6	4	20	24	51	−27	16

=== Group VIII ===
Pos	Team	Pld	W	D	L	GF	GA	GD	Pts
1	Mahón	16	11	3	2	37	11	+26	25
2	Atlètic de Ciutadella	16	9	4	3	32	17	+15	22
3	Ibiza	16	10	2	4	39	22	+17	22
4	Menorca	16	7	1	8	29	25	+4	15
5	Manacor	16	6	4	6	24	18	+6	13 (Note: 3 points deducted)
6	Alaior	16	5	1	10	16	29	−13	11
7	Juventud Sallista	16	4	3	9	16	29	−13	11
8	Felanitx	16	3	5	8	20	49	−29	11
9	Soledad	16	4	3	9	21	34	−13	11

=== Group IX ===
Pos	Team	Pld	W	D	L	GF	GA	GD	Pts
1	Ontinyent	30	15	10	5	57	28	+29	40
2	Alcoyano	30	16	8	6	75	37	+38	40
3	Atlético Saguntino	30	16	8	6	56	46	+10	40
4	Oliva	30	16	7	7	65	39	+26	39
5	Gandía	30	14	8	8	58	43	+15	36
6	Olímpic de Xàtiva	30	15	4	11	61	44	+17	34
7	Carcaixent	30	13	7	10	52	41	+11	33
8	Canals	30	13	6	11	48	50	−2	32
9	Onda	30	12	7	11	45	46	−1	31
10	Castellón	30	10	11	9	43	39	+4	31
11	Alzira	30	12	6	12	51	50	+1	30
12	Sueca	30	10	6	14	45	50	−5	26
13	Acero	30	9	6	15	40	62	−22	24
14	Tavernes	30	8	8	14	40	50	−10	24
15	Cullera	30	4	6	20	32	69	−37	14
16	L'Alcúdia	30	1	4	25	25	99	−74	6

=== Group X ===
Pos	Team	Pld	W	D	L	GF	GA	GD	Pts
1	Abarán	30	19	5	6	75	31	+44	43
2	Orihuela	30	19	4	7	59	30	+29	42
3	Jumilla	30	15	9	6	69	33	+36	39
4	Albacete	30	15	6	9	60	32	+28	36
5	Almansa	30	15	5	10	50	46	+4	35
6	Cieza	30	13	7	10	52	55	−3	33
7	Imperial	30	13	3	14	55	44	+11	29
8	Lorca	30	12	5	13	46	58	−12	29
9	Alicante	30	10	7	13	47	43	+4	27
10	Rayo Ibense	30	12	3	15	51	57	−6	27
11	La Roda	30	9	7	14	44	57	−13	25
12	Madrigueras	30	8	9	13	42	65	−23	25
13	Monóvar	30	10	5	15	47	74	−27	25
14	Águilas	30	8	7	15	59	64	−5	23
15	Crevillente Industrial	30	9	5	16	50	59	−9	23
16	Almoradí	30	7	5	18	30	88	−58	19

=== Group XI ===
Pos	Team	Pld	W	D	L	GF	GA	GD	Pts
1	Hispania	28	18	3	7	59	30	+29	39
2	Atlético Malagueño	28	13	10	5	40	16	+24	36
3	Antequerano	28	15	6	7	53	27	+26	36
4	Adra	28	15	5	8	38	27	+11	35
5	Écija	28	14	4	10	51	32	+19	32
6	Recreativo de Granada	28	12	6	10	52	41	+11	30
7	Linares	28	13	3	12	51	44	+7	29
8	Fuengirola	28	12	5	11	35	42	−7	29
9	Atlético Prieguense	28	11	6	11	37	35	+2	28
10	Atlético Cordobés	28	12	3	13	50	37	+13	27
11	Iliturgi	28	11	5	12	43	65	−22	27
12	Ronda	28	11	4	13	39	43	−4	26
13	Veleño	28	9	8	11	26	41	−15	26
14	Riffien Jadú	28	5	7	16	29	51	−22	17
15	Alhaurino	28	0	3	25	20	92	−72	3
16	Peñarroya Pueblonuevo (Note: Team withdrawn from the competition)	0	0	0	0	0	0	0	0

=== Group XII ===
Pos	Team	Pld	W	D	L	GF	GA	GD	Pts
1	Atlético Ceuta	30	22	2	6	87	20	+67	46
2	Algeciras	30	21	3	6	86	19	+67	45
3	Balón de Cádiz	30	19	4	7	65	28	+37	42
4	Portuense	30	17	6	7	69	43	+26	40
5	Kimber Utrera	30	15	6	9	52	41	+11	36
6	Ayamonte	30	14	4	12	45	44	+1	32
7	Balompédica Linense	30	13	6	11	52	41	+11	32
8	Coria	30	14	3	13	45	56	−11	31
9	Jerez Industrial	30	13	3	14	41	38	+3	29
10	Puerto Real	30	10	7	13	42	50	−8	27
11	Riotinto	30	11	5	14	42	53	−11	27
12	Xerez	30	10	5	15	42	49	−7	25
13	La Palma	30	9	2	19	27	67	−40	20
14	Barbate	30	8	5	17	38	72	−34	19 (Note: 2 points deducted)
15	Tarifa	30	6	4	20	26	67	−41	16
16	Bollullos	30	2	7	21	23	94	−71	11

=== Group XIII ===
Pos	Team	Pld	W	D	L	GF	GA	GD	Pts
1	Béjar Industrial	30	21	5	4	71	25	+46	47
2	Palencia	30	20	5	5	87	27	+60	45
3	Cacereño	30	20	4	6	86	26	+60	44
4	Cultural Leonesa	30	17	5	8	64	35	+29	39
5	Europa Delicias	30	14	6	10	64	37	+27	34
6	Salmantino	30	13	5	12	40	44	−4	31
7	Juventud	30	10	9	11	36	38	−2	29
8	Hullera Vasco-Leonesa	30	12	4	14	59	63	−4	28
9	Plasencia	30	10	6	14	46	63	−17	26
10	Ponferradina	30	10	6	14	51	50	+1	26
11	La Bañeza	30	11	4	15	34	56	−22	26
12	Ciudad Rodrigo	30	8	7	15	55	80	−25	23
13	Arandina	30	10	3	17	43	84	−41	23
14	Peñaranda	30	9	4	17	34	71	−37	22
15	Astorga	30	6	10	14	31	52	−21	22
16	San Pedro	30	4	7	19	20	70	−50	15

=== Group XIV ===
Pos	Team	Pld	W	D	L	GF	GA	GD	Pts
1	Calvo Sotelo	30	24	2	4	75	26	+49	50
2	Rayo Vallecano	30	14	13	3	53	30	+23	41
3	Badajoz	30	19	1	10	59	31	+28	39
4	Tomelloso	30	13	8	9	50	31	+19	34
5	Madrileño	30	14	5	11	41	37	+4	33
6	Extremadura	30	11	9	10	51	38	+13	31
7	Villarrobledo	30	12	7	11	36	43	−7	31
8	Alcalá	30	9	10	11	36	44	−8	28
9	Emeritense	30	12	3	15	40	48	−8	27
10	Gimnástica Segoviana	30	10	7	13	38	44	−6	27
11	Manchego	30	10	5	15	38	46	−8	25
12	Alcázar	30	12	1	17	43	58	−15	25
13	Conquense	30	7	11	12	47	50	−3	25
14	Carabanchel	30	8	8	14	42	61	−19	24
15	Real Aranjuez	30	8	6	16	37	62	−25	22
16	Getafe	30	5	8	17	30	67	−37	18

== Promotion playoff ==
=== Champions ===
==== First round ====
Team 1	Agg.	Team 2	1st leg	2nd leg
Atlético Ceuta	4–2	Barakaldo	4–0	0–2
Calvo Sotelo	7–1	Numancia	6–0	1–1
Ontinyent	(t) 2–2	Eibar	1–0	1–2
Racing de Ferrol	2–2 (t)	Abarán	1–0	1–2
Béjar Industrial	4–3	Fabra y Coats	3–1	1–2
Europa	6–2	Mahón	4–0	2–2

==== Final round ====
Team 1	Agg.	Team 2	1st leg	2nd leg
Atlético Ceuta	3–1	Calvo Sotelo	3–0	0–1
Hispania	2–2 (t)	Ontinyent	2–1	0–1
Abarán	(t) 1–1	Béjar Industrial	0–0	1–1
Caudal	3–7	Europa	1–1	2–6

=== Runners-up ===
==== First round ====
Team 1	Agg.	Team 2	1st leg	2nd leg
Huesca	2–5	Arenas de Getxo	1–0	1–5
Llanares	1–11	Rayo Vallecano	1–5	0–6
Badalona	3–1	Palencia	3–1	0–0
Atlético Malagueño	5–2	Orihuela	3–1	2–1
L'Hospitalet	6–5	Alcoyano	4–1	2–4
Algeciras	5–0	Lugo	3–0	2–0

==== Second round ====
Team 1	Agg.	Team 2	1st leg	2nd leg
Real Unión	2–4	Arenas de Getxo	1–1	1–3
Rayo Vallecano	2–5	Badalona	2–4	0–1
Atlético Malagueño	3–3 (t)	L'Hospitalet	0–1	3–2
Algeciras	6–0	Atlètic de Ciutadella	4–0	2–0

==== Final round ====
Team 1	Agg.	Team 2	1st leg	2nd leg
Arenas de Getxo	0–2	Langreo	0–0	0–2
Algeciras	(t) 3–3	Atlético Baleares	3–1	0–2
L'Hospitalet	3–2	Real Jaén	3–0	0–2
Badalona	4–2	Cartagena	3–1	1–1

== Season records ==
- Most wins: 25, Racing de Ferrol.
- Most draws: 13, Rayo Vallecano.
- Most losses: 25, Lieres, Artiguense, L'Alcúdia and Alhaurino.
- Most goals for: 93, Numancia.
- Most goals against: 109, Artiguense.
- Most points: 53, Racing de Ferrol.
- Fewest wins: 0, Alhaurino.
- Fewest draws: 1, 5 teams.
- Fewest losses: 2, Racing de Ferrol, Numancia and Mahón.
- Fewest goals for: 16, Alaior and Juventud Sallista.
- Fewest goals against: 11, Mahón.
- Fewest points: 3, Alhaurino.
