= Tiebreaker =

Means of deciding a single winner of an otherwise-tied contest (e.g. sports)

In games and sport, a tiebreaker or tiebreak is any method used to determine a winner or to rank participants when there is a tie - meaning two or more parties have achieved a same score or result. A tiebreaker provides the additional criterion or set of criteria to distinguish between the tied participants and establish a clear ranking or winner. In some sports, it is known as a countback.

== General operation ==
=== In matches ===
In some situations, the tiebreaker may consist of another round of play. For example, if contestants are tied at the end of a quiz game, they each might be asked one or more extra questions, and whoever correctly answers the most from that extra set is the winner. In many sports, teams that are tied at the end of a match compete in an additional period of play called "overtime" or "extra time". The extra round may also not follow the regular format, e.g. a tiebreak in tennis or a penalty shootout in association football. In the Super Smash Bros. series of platform fighting games published by Nintendo, if at least two fighters have an equal amount of points or stocks when time runs out, then a tiebreaker will occur as "Sudden Death", in which the tied players receive 300% damage and whoever delivers the final hit wins the match.

=== In tournaments and playoffs ===
In some sports, tournaments, and playoffs, the tiebreaker is a statistic that is compared between different contestants who have the same win–loss record, number of points scored, or other measure. Some competitions, such as the FIFA World Cup, the EuroLeague, the National Basketball Association, the National Hockey League and the National Football League, have a whole set of tiebreaking rules in which a group of statistics are compared between the tied teams, one at a time, to determine the seeding in their respective knockout or playoff tournament.

The statistics that are compared may include total goals scored, the record between the two tied teams, and other factors. In many of these tiebreaking rules, if the teams remain tied after comparing all of these statistics, then the tie is broken at random using a coin toss or a drawing of lots.

Swiss-system tournaments use a variety of criteria not found in other types of tournament which exploit features specific to the Swiss system.

In some sports leagues, a one-game playoff, or occasionally a "best-of" series format, may be played instead to break the tie.

=== In promotion/relegation and draft order ===
Some sports leagues may use tiebreaking rules to help determine which teams that have the same win–loss record are promoted and relegated, or have the higher pick in their respective draft. These tiebreaking rules may be the same ones used in their respective knockout or playoff tournament, except that the tied team with the worse statistic is the one that is relegated or receives a higher draft pick. In some sports leagues, such as the National Football League, however, the set of tiebreaking rules used to compare the worst-ranked teams is completely different from the rules used to select the playoff teams.

== By sport ==
=== Association football ===
In association football contests, many matches are allowed to end in a draw, particularly when played in a round-robin tournament ("league format", or "Group Stage" in a tournament). In cases where a winner must be chosen, such as play-offs, a tournament's final or a single-elimination tournament, there are several methods of deciding this: extra time, penalty shoot-out, match replay, and the away goals rule in a two-legged tie.

For a league or group stage, where two teams have the same number of points at the end, the common tiebreakers are usually overall goal difference, or a head- to- head comparison of points between the involved teams. A typical system works as follows:

Points: Teams earn points during the tournament (3 points for a win, 1 point for a draw, and 0 points for a loss).

Tiebreaker - Goal Difference: If teams end up with the same number of points, the team with the higher goal difference (more goals scored than conceded) is ranked higher.

Further Tiebreakers: If the teams are still tied after using goal difference, other factors like the total number of goals scored, head-to-head results, or fair play points might be considered.

For example, in the 2018 FIFA World Cup, both South Korea and Germany finished with 3 points in Group F. However, South Korea had a better goal difference (-1 compared to Germany's -2), so South Korea was ranked above Germany. This method of tiebreaker does not involve any extra gameplay, and instead only uses pre-existing statistics. Though comparing goals scored is a common method of tiebreak, other tiebreaks can entail a drawing of lots ( as happened between Ireland and the Netherlands in the 1990 FIFA World Cup), or a "Fair Play Table" where teams are ranked according to how many yellow and red cards each team accumulated.

==== Extra time tiebreaker ====
After regular time or 90 minutes, the usual method is extra time, in which the teams play two 15-minute periods. The team that leads at the end of these 30 minutes wins the tie. If, at the end of extra time, after 120 minutes, no winner can be decided, the match goes to a penalty shoot-out.

==== Penalty shoot-out tiebreaker ====
Occasionally, in matches such as the Community Shield in England, the match can go straight to a penalty shootout after 90 minutes of play have been completed.

==== Match replay ====
Alternatively, in tournaments such as the English FA Cup, the match is replayed in its entirety, going through the aforementioned stages of extra time and penalties if the second match is drawn. This method is no longer used from the quarter-finals onwards. In league matches, when two or more teams are tied on points, a series of tiebreakers is used, of which goal difference and head-to-head points are the most common. Some competitions (including FIFA competitions) use goal difference as the first tiebreaker, while others (including UEFA and AFC competitions) use head-to-head points.

=== American football ===
In the National Football League of professional American football, if both teams are tied at the end of regulation, an overtime period is played under modified "sudden death" rules. Before the 2017 season, this period was 15 minutes in all games. Since 2017, a 15-minute period has been used only in playoff games (in which a winner must be decided); overtime in regular-season games consists of a 10-minute period, no overtime in preseason up to 1973 & since 2021. If the team that receives the ball first scores a field goal, then the opponent must receive a chance at equalising that score of their own; the first team to score a touchdown or safety wins the game; and once both teams have had possession of the ball in overtime, the first team to score under any legal means, touchdown (offensive or defensive), field goal or safety, wins. If neither team scores before the end of the overtime period, or both teams score one field goal each, the game is considered a draw and ends, and counts as a "half-win" in the standings for purposes of winning percentage for both draft order and playoff positioning. However, in the playoffs, true sudden death rules apply from double overtime onwards.

=== Australian rules football ===
There is no tiebreak for regular season matches in Australian rules football, and each team earns two points.

In the AFL, new rules were introduced for finals in 2016 and modified in 2020: if there is a tie at the expiry of regulation time, including in the Grand Final, two three- minute halves of extra time are played, with the teams swapping ends after each half. If the match is still tied when extra time has expired, the procedure is repeated (but in true golden point) until a winner is determined.

==== Previous systems ====
Prior to 1991, if the scores were tied in a finals match after the final siren, the drawn final would be replayed on the following weekend, thus delaying all other finals by one week.

Due to various logistical issues that arose following the drawn 1990 Qualifying Final, the AFL replaced this procedure with extra time (with the exception of the Grand Final) in 1991. Until 2015, if the scores in a finals match were tied when regulation time expired, two five-minute halves of extra time were played until a winner was determined. This procedure was used twice: in the 1994 Second Qualifying Final between North Melbourne and Hawthorn (won by North Melbourne), and the 2007 Second Semi-final between West Coast and Collingwood (won by Collingwood).

If the scores were tied after the final siren in the Grand Final, the match would be replayed on the following weekend.

=== Baseball ===
If a baseball game is tied at the end of the usual nine innings, the game continues into extra innings until an inning ends with one team ahead. Games are occasionally ended as ties on account of weather or darkness (the latter happened much more often before lights were installed on most professional baseball fields in the 1940s), and some leagues (including Nippon Professional Baseball) allow only a limited number of extra innings before a game ends as a tie; professional baseball in the United States, however, has no such limit. The longest Major League game in history (on May 1, 1920) lasted 26 innings, and a minor-league game in 1981 lasted 33 innings. In some venues, including international baseball, the second extra inning may begin with a full reset of the batting order to the coach's choice, with up to two runners already on base, in order to increase the chances of a resolution.

Major League Baseball used the term "tiebreaker" to refer to one or more additional games played after the scheduled end of the regular season between teams with identical win–loss records in order to determine participants in postseason play. This tiebreaker game format was abolished in the 2022 season, when the postseason was expanded.

=== Chess ===
In chess, when two players play a match against each other and the score is even after the scheduled number of games, a tiebreak is often played using games with faster time controls. In tournaments, when two or more players have the same final score, there can be a play-off, but usually an auxiliary scoring system is used.

=== Cricket ===
Most cricket matches do not feature tiebreakers. The most common tiebreaking method in limited overs cricket matches is the Super Over, wherein each team plays an additional over of six balls to determine the result. Subsequent Super Overs may be played if the first Super Over ends in a tie.

In a tournament, the most common way to separate two teams tied on points gained from matches won and lost is Net Run Rate, which is a measure of the margin by which a team wins or loses each game of the tournament.

=== Field events ===
==== High jump and pole vault ====
World Athletics, the international governing body for athletics, uses the following criteria to break ties (rule 26.8 in the 2020 edition of the World Athletics competition and technical rules):

1. Fewest misses at the tie height cleared

2. Fewest misses throughout the competition (passes are not counted)

3. If the competitors are not tied for first place, a tie is declared. For first place, a jump-off may be run. However, the competitors have the option to not jump any more, either before or during the jump-off, in which case they would remain tied. This occurred in the men's high jump at the 2020 Summer Olympics. Mutaz Essa Barshim and Gianmarco Tamberi both cleared 2.37 m without a single miss in the event and both failed to clear 2.39. Rather than go to a jump-off, Barshim asked, "Can we have two golds?" Both were declared Olympic champions.

==== Other field events ====
Per rule 25.22 of the 2020 edition of the World Athletics competition and technical rules, the second-best result is used to determine placements. If the competitors are still tied, then the third-best is checked, and so on. If the tie is still not broken after all results are compared, a tie is declared.

In the men's long jump at the 2020 Summer Olympics, Miltiadis Tentoglou and Juan Miguel Echevarría both reached 8.41 m, but Tentoglou was awarded the gold medal because his second-best result was 8.15, to Echevarría's 8.09.

=== Golf ===
During golf tournaments, players often finish tied with each other. If players are tied after the final round, governing bodies such as the USGA use a "Last Played Option" tiebreaker, comparing the total number of strokes on the back nine, back six, back three or even the final hole. In the rare event that there is still a tie after all of these comparisons, the golfers are ranked in alphabetical order.

=== Motorsports ===
If at the end of a Formula 1 season several drivers have the same number of points, the individual placings are used as a tiebreaker: first the number of race wins, then the number of second places, and so on. If these are also the same, the positions in qualifying are used. As of 2025, no Formula 1 championship has yet been decided by the tiebreaker. The closest was the 1984 season, when Niki Lauda won the championship by half a point over Alain Prost. The half points came from the fact that the race in Monaco was shortened and therefore only half points were awarded. The IndyCar Series uses essentially the same procedure, but if the drivers' finishing positions in all races are identical, a draw is held instead of using qualifying. In 1996, 1999, 2006 and 2015, there was a tie between the top two places. In the first IRL season in 1996, both drivers (Scott Sharp and Buzz Calkins) were declared co-champions because there was no tiebreaker rule at that time. In 1999, J.P. Montoya won by winning more races than Dario Franchitti; in 2006, Sam Hornish Jr. also won by winning more races than Dan Wheldon; and in 2015, Scott Dixon won by winning more races than Montoya.

In NASCAR, due to the current playoff system, a tie in points cannot occur at the end of the season. If there is a tie in points for cut-off positions during the playoff rounds, the best finish in that round counts instead of the best finishes from all previous races. If the drivers have the same finish positions in the respective playoff round, the driver who reached the best of the three finishes first will advance. However, under the old Chase format, there was a points tie between Tony Stewart and Carl Edwards in 2011. Stewart won by virtue of five individual race wins to Edwards' one victory. The closest title race in the pre-Chase era was 1992, when Alan Kulwicki won the championship by ten points over Bill Elliott.

=== Pickleball ===
Pickleball leagues that use the MLP team format can result in a tie after two games of gender doubles and two games of mixed doubles. When such a tie occurs, a game of singles, called a dreambreaker or dillbreaker, is played.

=== Shooting ===
Field target — a precision air rifle shooting sport — uses either a sudden-death or shot count tiebreaker. The sudden-death tiebreaker (usually used to determine a single place, such as 3rd when 3 awards are to be given, or between two shooters) consists of each tied shooter (in an order dictated or decided by coin toss or another technique) shooting at a target (typically a difficult shot such as ½" at 35 yards). If all shooters in the tie fail, the target is moved closer. If one shooter hits, the next shooter(s) who miss are out of the competition. If a round is complete with multiple ties remaining, the target is moved out (made more difficult) and the same procedure is repeated until only one shooter remains. This procedure can then be repeated to determine further placings among the losers of the previous round.

In cases where multiple places are to be determined (as in five people tied for first place), one approach is to have each shooter make several shots (n − 1 or more with n being the number of tied shooters). If all shooters miss all shots, the target is moved in (made easier); similarly, if all shooters hit on all shots, the target is moved out (made more difficult). If some variation in hits exists after a round, the top score gets the highest placing while those with identical scores can have a sudden-death shootout or a repeat of the multiple shot shootout (typically with a more difficult target) to determine other placings.

=== Snooker ===
If the scores are level when all the balls are potted in a frame of snooker, the black is "respotted" (placed back on the table, on its designated spot) and the cue ball put "in hand". The referee will then toss a coin, and the winner of the coin toss decides who will take the first shot. Play then continues until the black is potted or another frame-ending situation occurs.

=== Sumo ===
At the conclusion of a professional sumo tournament (本場所, honbasho), the winner of a division is the wrestler (力士, rikishi) with the best record at the end of the 15-day tournament. If two or more wrestlers are tied for the lead within a division, a series of additional playoff bouts will be held on the final day to determine the divisional champion. Restrictions against bouts between close relatives, members of the same stable, and previously faced opponents are lifted during a playoff situation.

== See also ==
- Overtime (sport)
- Tie (draw)
- One-game playoff
