= 1958–59 Tercera División =

Tercera División
- Season: 1958–59

The 1958–59 Tercera División season was the 23rd since its establishment.

== League table ==
=== Group 1 ===
Pos	Team	Pld	W	D	L	GF	GA	GD	Pts	Qualification or relegation
1	Orense	30	23	2	5	110	31	+79	48	Promotion play-offs (champions)
2	Turista	30	22	1	7	88	34	+54	45	Promotion/relegation play-offs
3	Lugo	30	21	2	7	90	37	+53	44	
4	Juvenil	30	17	4	9	66	50	+16	38	
5	Órdenes	30	14	6	10	44	49	−5	34	
6	Gran Peña	30	12	7	11	61	61	0	31	
7	Arsenal Ferrol	30	14	3	13	46	53	−7	31	
8	Zeltia	30	13	4	13	67	66	+1	30	
9	Pontevedra	30	12	5	13	54	48	+6	29	
10	Arosa	30	9	9	12	42	57	−15	27	
11	Flavia	30	11	2	17	53	64	−11	24	
12	Cambados	30	9	6	15	49	68	−19	24	
13	Fabril	30	10	4	16	58	66	−8	24	
14	Santiago	30	7	6	17	43	76	−33	20	
15	Vivero	30	8	4	18	39	88	−49	20	
16	Puenteareas	30	5	1	24	29	91	−62	11	Relegation to Regional

=== Group 3 ===
Source:

== Promotion play-off ==
Source:
