= 1960–61 Segunda División =

30th season of the second-tier football league in Spain

Segunda División
- Season: 1960–61
- Champions: Osasuna; Tenerife
- Promoted: Osasuna; Tenerife
- Relegated: Condal; Castellón; Sestao; Baracaldo; Extremadura; Tarrasa; Rayo Vallecano
- Matches: 480
- Goals: 1,430 (2.98 per match)
- Top goalscorer: José Luis Veloso (26 goals)
- Best goalkeeper: Ñito (0.67 goals/match)
- Biggest home win: Plus Ultra 11–0 Jaén (6 November 1960)
- Biggest away win: Castellón 0–4 Plus Ultra (23 October 1960); Extremadura 0–4 Rayo Vallecano (6 November 1960)
- Highest scoring: Osasuna 11–1 Indauchu (9 October 1960); Mestalla 9–3 Cádiz (30 April 1961)

The 1960–61 Segunda División season was the 30th since its establishment and was played between 10 September 1960 and 30 April 1961.

== Overview before the season ==
32 teams joined the league, including two relegated from the 1959–60 La Liga and 6 promoted from the 1959–60 Tercera División.

Relegated from La Liga

- Las Palmas
- Osasuna

Promoted from Tercera División

- Pontevedra
- San Sebastián
- Hércules
- Málaga
- Castellón
- Salamanca

== Group North ==
=== Teams ===
Location of teams in Segunda División 1960-61 Group North

Club	City	Stadium
Baracaldo Altos Hornos	Baracaldo	Lasesarre
CD Basconia	Basauri	Pedro López Cortázar
RC Celta de Vigo	Vigo	Balaídos
CD Condal	Barcelona	Les Corts
Cultural y Deportiva Leonesa	León	La Puentecilla
RC Deportivo La Coruña	La Coruña	Riazor
Real Gijón CF	Gijón	El Molinón
SD Indauchu	Bilbao	Garellano
CD Orense	Orense	José Antonio
Osasuna	Pamplona	San Juan
Pontevedra CF	Pontevedra	Pasarón
CD Sabadell FC	Sabadell	Cruz Alta
Salamanca	Salamanca	El Calvario
San Sebastián CF	San Sebastián	Atocha
Club Sestao	Sestao	Las Llanas
CD Tarrasa	Tarrasa	Obispo Irurita

=== League table ===
Pos	Team	Pld	W	D	L	GF	GA	GD	Pts	Promotion, qualification or relegation
1	Osasuna (P)	30	21	4	5	83	25	+58	46	Promotion to La Liga
2	Celta Vigo	30	17	6	7	56	30	+26	40	Qualification for the promotion playoffs
3	Deportivo La Coruña	30	15	6	9	68	47	+21	36 (Note: Deportivo La Coruña finished ahead of Ourense on head-to-head points: Ourense–Deportivo La Coruña 0–3, Deportivo La Coruña–Ourense 2–1)	
4	Ourense	30	14	8	8	45	36	+9	36	
5	Pontevedra	30	11	9	10	39	40	−1	31 (Note: Pontevedra finished ahead of Sabadell on overall goal difference)	
6	Sabadell	30	11	9	10	30	40	−10	31	
7	Cultural Leonesa	30	11	8	11	39	42	−3	30	
8	Basconia	30	14	1	15	41	57	−16	29 (Note: Basconia finished ahead of San Sebastián and Salamanca on head-to-head points: Basconia 5 pts, San Sebastián 4 pts, Salamanca 3 pts)	
9	San Sebastián	30	11	7	12	51	50	+1	29	
10	Salamanca	30	11	7	12	42	36	+6	29	
11	Indauchu	30	12	3	15	46	59	−13	27	
12	Condal (Note: Condal quit Segunda División at the end of the season) (R)	30	8	10	12	44	49	−5	26	Relegation to Tercera División
13	Real Gijón (Note: Real Gijón, relegated in the playoffs, maintained the second tier after winning a tournament in Palma with other teams from the Tercera División) (O)	30	10	5	15	41	53	−12	25	Qualification for the relegation playoffs
14	Sestao (R)	30	8	8	14	35	51	−16	24	Qualification for the relegation playoffs
15	Baracaldo (R)	30	7	8	15	33	51	−18	22	Relegation to Tercera División
16	Tarrasa (R)	30	5	9	16	33	60	−27	19	Relegation to Tercera División

Source: BDFútbol
Rules for classification: 1) points; 2) head-to-head points; 3) head-to-head goal difference; 4) goal difference; 5) number of goals scored
(O) Play-off winners; (P) Promoted; (R) Relegated

=== Top goalscorers ===
Goalscorers	Goals	Team
(Spain) José Luis Veloso	26	Deportivo La Coruña
(Spain) Félix Ruiz	21	Osasuna
(Spain) Lolo Gómez	21	Celta Vigo
(Spain) Josep Maria Fusté	18	Osasuna
(Spain) José Antonio Hormaeche	17	Osasuna

=== Top goalkeepers ===
Goalkeeper	Goals	Matches	Average	Team
(Spain) Juan Antonio Celdrán	25	30	0.83	Osasuna
(Spain) José Ramón Ibarreche	26	22	1.18	Ourense
(Spain) Miguel Mambrilla	36	29	1.24	Cultural Leonesa
(Spain) José Ginesta	34	25	1.36	Sabadell
(Spain) Agustín Estévez	32	22	1.45	Pontevedra

=== Results ===
Home \ Away	BAR	BAS	CEL	CON	CUL	DEP	GIJ	IND	ORE	OSA	PON	SAB	SAL	SSE	SES	TAR
Baracaldo	—	3–1	1–1	3–1	1–0	3–3	2–3	0–2	0–1	0–2	2–2	0–1	0–0	2–0	1–1	5–2
Basconia	2–1	—	5–4	1–0	0–2	3–1	0–2	1–0	3–1	0–2	2–1	2–0	2–2	3–4	3–1	0–1
Celta Vigo	5–0	5–0	—	3–0	3–0	3–0	2–0	3–0	1–1	4–1	1–1	2–0	0–0	1–0	4–2	2–1
Condal	1–1	2–0	0–0	—	1–3	2–2	5–0	3–1	3–0	0–2	1–2	1–2	2–1	4–2	3–1	2–1
Cultural Leonesa	1–2	3–1	2–0	6–1	—	0–0	1–1	2–0	1–0	0–0	3–1	1–1	1–0	0–0	0–0	3–1
Deportivo La Coruña	3–0	0–1	0–1	1–1	2–3	—	0–1	3–1	2–1	2–1	2–0	4–1	3–2	5–1	6–1	5–1
Gijón	0–0	2–4	0–1	1–0	3–0	1–4	—	4–1	2–2	1–1	6–2	1–1	3–2	3–0	2–0	1–2
Indauchu	3–1	2–1	5–2	0–0	6–1	4–3	4–0	—	3–4	0–1	2–1	3–1	0–3	2–1	0–0	2–0
Orense	3–0	2–1	2–0	2–2	3–0	0–3	3–0	2–0	—	3–1	2–0	4–1	0–0	1–1	2–0	1–1
Osasuna	1–1	9–0	3–1	2–1	3–0	4–2	2–0	11–1	6–0	—	2–2	6–0	3–0	3–0	4–0	4–0
Pontevedra	1–0	1–0	1–0	2–0	4–1	0–1	2–1	3–1	0–1	1–0	—	0–0	2–2	1–1	1–0	6–2
Sabadell	2–1	2–1	0–1	1–1	0–0	1–1	3–1	1–0	1–0	0–1	1–1	—	0–0	1–0	4–2	2–0
Salamanca	3–0	0–1	0–2	3–1	1–0	1–3	2–0	1–2	1–0	2–0	4–0	4–2	—	3–1	0–2	1–0
San Sebastián	1–0	0–1	3–1	3–3	3–2	8–3	3–1	3–0	1–1	2–3	1–0	0–1	2–1	—	3–1	6–2
Sestao	3–0	4–1	0–1	2–2	2–1	0–3	2–1	2–0	1–1	1–2	1–1	2–0	1–1	1–1	—	1–0
Tarrasa	2–3	0–1	2–2	1–1	2–2	1–1	2–0	1–1	1–2	1–3	0–0	0–0	3–2	0–0	3–1	—

Source: BDFútbol
Legend: Blue = home team win; Yellow = draw; Red = away team win.

== Group South ==
=== Teams ===
Location of teams in Segunda División 1960-61 Group South
Canary Islands

Club	City	Stadium
Cádiz CF	Cádiz	Ramón de Carranza
CD Castellón	Castellón de la Plana	Castalia
CA Ceuta	Ceuta	Alfonso Murube
Córdoba CF	Córdoba	El Arcángel
CF Extremadura	Almendralejo	Francisco de la Hera
Hércules CF	Alicante	La Viña
Real Jaén CF	Jaén	La Victoria
UD Las Palmas	Las Palmas	Insular
Levante UD	Valencia	Vallejo
CD Málaga	Málaga	La Rosaleda
CD Mestalla	Valencia	Mestalla
Real Murcia	Murcia	La Condomina
AD Plus Ultra	Madrid	Campo de Ciudad Lineal
AD Rayo Vallecano	Madrid	Vallecas
CD San Fernando	San Fernando	Marqués de Varela
CD Tenerife	Santa Cruz de Tenerife	Heliodoro Rodríguez López

=== League table ===
Pos	Team	Pld	W	D	L	GF	GA	GD	Pts	Promotion, qualification or relegation
1	Tenerife (P)	30	17	6	7	45	23	+22	40	Promotion to La Liga
2	Atlético Ceuta	30	17	4	9	51	35	+16	38	Qualification for the promotion playoffs
3	Hércules	30	16	4	10	53	40	+13	36	
4	Cádiz	30	16	3	11	55	54	+1	35	
5	Las Palmas	30	13	6	11	33	32	+1	32 (Note: Las Palmas finished ahead of Levante on head-to-head points: Levante–Las Palmas 0–1, Las Palmas–Levante 2–1)	
6	Levante	30	13	6	11	58	40	+18	32	
7	Plus Ultra	30	15	1	14	58	41	+17	31 (Note: Plus Ultra finished ahead of Murcia on head-to-head points: Murcia–Plus Ultra 2–3, Plus Ultra–Murcia 1–0)	
8	Murcia	30	13	5	12	45	39	+6	31	
9	Córdoba	30	14	2	14	40	34	+6	30 (Note: Córdoba finished ahead of Mestalla on head-to-head goal difference: Córdoba–Mestalla 3–0, Mestalla–Córdoba 3–1)	
10	Mestalla	30	12	6	12	55	48	+7	30	
11	San Fernando	30	9	9	12	33	37	−4	27	
12	Málaga	30	10	6	14	42	52	−10	26	
13	Castellón (R)	30	8	8	14	36	50	−14	24 (Note: Castellón finished ahead of Jaén on head-to-head goal difference: Jaén–Castellón 1–0, Castellón–Jaén 3–0)	Qualification for the relegation playoffs
14	Jaén (O)	30	10	4	16	31	61	−30	24	Qualification for the relegation playoffs
15	Extremadura (R)	30	9	5	16	31	63	−32	23	Relegation to Tercera División
16	Rayo Vallecano (R)	30	8	5	17	38	55	−17	21	Relegation to Tercera División

Source: BDFútbol
Rules for classification: 1) points; 2) head-to-head points; 3) head-to-head goal difference; 4) goal difference; 5) number of goals scored
(O) Play-off winners; (P) Promoted; (R) Relegated

=== Top goalscorers ===
Goalscorers	Goals	Team
(Spain) Josep Mauri	19	Levante
(Spain) Vicente Guillot	17	Mestalla
(Spain) Miguel Sánchez	15	Cádiz
(Spain) Manuel Gijón	14	Hércules
(Spain) Luis Lax	14	Murcia

=== Top goalkeepers ===
Goalkeeper	Goals	Matches	Average	Team
(Spain) Ñito	18	27	0.67	Tenerife
(Spain) Antonio Betancort	23	23	1	Las Palmas
(Spain) Antonio Ramírez	29	25	1.16	Hércules
(Spain) José Puche	26	22	1.18	San Fernando
(Spain) Lorenzo Zúnica	25	21	1.19	Atlético Ceuta

=== Results ===
Home \ Away	CÁD	CAS	CEU	CÓR	EXT	HÉR	JAÉ	LPA	LEV	MGA	MES	MUR	PLU	RAY	SFE	TEN
Cádiz	—	3–1	1–0	2–0	3–1	0–1	6–0	2–0	3–1	5–2	1–1	2–1	3–0	0–0	1–0	1–0
Castellón	0–3	—	1–2	2–0	0–0	2–0	3–0	2–2	1–1	3–1	3–1	0–0	0–4	5–1	2–1	1–2
Atlético Ceuta	1–2	6–0	—	2–1	1–0	0–3	4–0	2–0	2–1	1–0	1–0	4–2	3–2	2–0	2–0	0–0
Córdoba	0–1	3–1	1–0	—	4–0	4–0	0–2	1–0	2–1	0–1	3–0	1–0	1–0	3–2	3–0	2–0
Extremadura	1–3	2–0	2–2	3–2	—	1–0	2–1	3–2	2–2	2–0	1–0	2–1	2–1	0–4	1–1	0–0
Hércules	8–2	2–1	2–2	1–0	3–0	—	5–1	1–2	2–1	4–0	4–3	3–1	1–0	1–0	2–0	1–0
Real Jaén	2–1	1–0	0–3	2–1	2–0	4–0	—	0–1	0–1	3–1	2–1	2–1	3–0	2–2	0–0	0–0
Las Palmas	1–0	1–0	0–1	1–1	6–2	1–0	3–1	—	2–1	0–0	1–1	0–1	2–1	2–1	2–0	0–0
Levante	3–0	6–1	2–4	2–0	3–1	1–1	2–1	0–1	—	2–1	3–1	4–0	2–1	7–1	1–1	1–2
Málaga	4–1	0–2	2–2	1–0	6–0	3–0	3–0	0–0	1–3	—	4–2	0–0	4–2	4–1	2–2	2–1
Mestalla	9–3	1–1	2–0	3–1	6–2	2–2	1–0	1–0	1–4	4–0	—	3–0	2–1	3–1	1–1	3–0
Real Murcia	4–1	0–0	5–0	4–2	2–0	3–2	2–0	2–1	0–0	4–0	2–0	—	2–3	2–1	3–2	0–0
Plus Ultra	4–0	1–0	2–0	1–1	3–1	3–1	11–0	1–2	2–0	2–0	1–3	1–0	—	3–1	3–2	3–0
Rayo Vallecano	4–3	0–0	1–3	0–1	1–0	0–2	2–2	3–0	2–2	1–0	3–0	2–0	0–1	—	3–0	0–2
San Fernando	2–2	2–2	1–0	1–2	2–0	3–1	1–0	3–0	1–0	0–0	0–0	0–1	2–1	3–0	—	2–1
Tenerife	3–0	4–2	2–1	1–0	2–0	0–0	4–0	1–0	3–1	5–0	3–0	3–2	3–0	2–1	1–0	—

Source: BDFútbol
Legend: Blue = home team win; Yellow = draw; Red = away team win.

== Promotion playoffs ==
=== First leg ===
4 June 1961	Atlético Ceuta	1–0	Elche	Ceuta
	Ayala 50'	Report		Stadium: Alfonso Murube; Referee: López Zaballa

4 June 1961	Oviedo	1–0	Celta Vigo	Oviedo
	Aragonés 44'	Report		Stadium: Carlos Tartiere; Referee: Novella Barco

=== Second leg ===
11 June 1961	Celta Vigo	2–2 (2–3 agg.)	Oviedo	Vigo
	Sampedro 61'; Pais 72'	Report	Ansola 23'; Artabe 37'	Stadium: Balaídos; Referee: Simó Fiol

11 June 1961	Elche	4–0 (4–1 agg.)	Atlético Ceuta	Elche
	Romero 36'; Ré 63', 82'; Iborra 87'	Report		Stadium: Altabix; Referee: Plaza Pedraz

== Relegation playoffs ==
=== First leg ===
18 June 1961	Galdácano	1–1	Jaén	Galdakao
	Olabarrieta 69'	Report	Arteaga 38'	Stadium: Santa Bárbara; Referee: Varas Gómez

18 June 1961	Castellón	1–0	Villarrobledo	Castellón de la Plana
	Badenes 15'	Report		Stadium: Castalia; Referee: Rigo Sureda

18 June 1961	Real Gijón	2–3	Burgos	Gijón
	Arbaizar 6' (pen.); Silvestre 23'	Report	Zamanillo 15'; Ceresuela 51'; Girón 70'	Stadium: El Molinón; Referee: García Orbegozo

18 June 1961	Cartagena	3–0	Sestao	Cartagena
	Hermoso 57', 63'; Cortés 88'	Report		Stadium: El Almarjal; Referee: Ruiz Alciturri

=== Second leg ===
24 June 1961	Sestao	1–1 (1–4 agg.)	Cartagena	Bilbao
	Izaguirre 12'	Report	Suárez 57'	Stadium: San Mamés; Referee: Modol Solé

25 June 1961	Burgos	2–1 (5–3 agg.)	Real Gijón	Burgos
	Martínez 2'; Fausti 21'	Report	Ortiz 4'	Stadium: Zatorre; Referee: Rey Otero

25 June 1961	Villarrobledo	3–0 (3–1 agg.)	Castellón	Villarrobledo
	Pepín 5'; Gallardo 13' (pen.), 19'	Report		Stadium: La Caridad; Referee: Infante Mendieta

25 June 1961	Jaén	5–2 (6–3 agg.)	Galdácano	Jaén
	Arteaga 16'; Arregui 25', 56'; Achotegui 26', 39'	Report		Stadium: La Victoria; Referee: Clausí
