= Callosa Deportiva CF =

Spanish football club

Callosa Deportiva
- Full name: Callosa Deportiva Club de Fútbol
- Nickname: Callosa Deportiva
- Founded: 1933
- Ground: El Palmeral, Callosa de Segura, Valencian Community, Spain
- Capacity: 1,090
- Chairman: Jose Manuel Ballester
- Manager: Jose Antonio Palomino
- League: Primera FFCV – Group 4
- 2024–25: Primera FFCV – Group 4, 9th of 16
Home colours	Away colours

Callosa Deportiva Club de Fútbol is a Spanish football club that based in Callosa de Segura, in the Valencian Community. Founded in 1933, it plays in Primera FFCV – Group 4, holding home matches at the Estadio El Palmeral, with a capacity of 1,090 people.

== Season to season ==
Season	Tier	Division	Place	Copa del Rey
1933–34	5	2ª Reg.	4th	
1934–35	DNP			
1935–36	DNP			
1939–40	DNP			
1940–41	5	2ª Reg.	1st	
1941–42	5	2ª Reg.	3rd	
1942–43	5	2ª Reg.	3rd	
1943–1951	DNP			
1951–52	4	1ª Reg.	4th	
1952–53	4	1ª Reg.	10th	
1953–54	4	1ª Reg.	1st	
1954–55	4	1ª Reg.	2nd	
1955–56	3	3ª	7th	
1956–57	3	3ª	7th	
1957–58	3	3ª	14th	
1958–59	3	3ª	11th	
1959–60	3	3ª	13th	
1960–61	3	3ª	16th	
1961–62	3	3ª	16th	
1962–1966	DNP			

Season	Tier	Division	Place	Copa del Rey
1966–67	4	1ª Reg.	7th	
1967–68	4	1ª Reg.	14th	
1968–69	5	2ª Reg.	10th	
1969–70	5	2ª Reg.	11th	
1970–71	5	2ª Reg.	7th	
1971–72	6	2ª Reg.	7th	
1972–73	6	2ª Reg.	1st	
1973–74	5	1ª Reg.	7th	
1974–75	4	Reg. Pref.	16th	
1975–76	5	1ª Reg.	1st	
1976–77	4	Reg. Pref.	4th	
1977–78	5	Reg. Pref.	4th	
1978–79	5	Reg. Pref.	11th	
1979–80	5	Reg. Pref.	15th	
1980–81	4	3ª	8th	
1981–82	4	3ª	20th	
1982–83	5	Reg. Pref.	9th	
1983–84	5	Reg. Pref.	4th	
1984–85	5	Reg. Pref.	3rd	
1985–86	4	3ª	17th	

Season	Tier	Division	Place	Copa del Rey
1986–87	4	3ª	8th	
1987–88	4	3ª	16th	
1988–89	4	3ª	20th	
1989–90	5	Reg. Pref.	7th	
1990–91	5	Reg. Pref.	10th	
1991–92	5	Reg. Pref.	13th	
1992–93	6	1ª Reg.	6th	
1993–94	6	1ª Reg.	19th	
1994–95	DNP			
1995–96	DNP			
1996–97	7	2ª Reg.	2nd	
1997–98	6	1ª Reg.	14th	
1998–99	6	1ª Reg.	9th	
1999–2000	6	1ª Reg.	3rd	
2000–01	6	1ª Reg.	12th	
2001–02	6	1ª Reg.	4th	
2002–03	6	1ª Reg.	7th	
2003–04	6	1ª Reg.	14th	
2004–05	7	2ª Reg.	8th	
2005–06	6	1ª Reg.	9th	

Season	Tier	Division	Place	Copa del Rey
2006–07	6	1ª Reg.	4th	
2007–08	6	1ª Reg.	6th	
2008–09	6	1ª Reg.	11th	
2009–10	6	1ª Reg.	3rd	
2010–11	6	1ª Reg.	1st	
2011–12	5	Reg. Pref.	5th	
2012–13	5	Reg. Pref.	5th	
2013–14	5	Reg. Pref.	9th	
2014–15	5	Reg. Pref.	5th	
2015–16	5	Reg. Pref.	14th	
2016–17	5	Reg. Pref.	12th	
2017–18	5	Reg. Pref.	4th	
2018–19	5	Reg. Pref.	11th	
2019–20	5	Reg. Pref.	5th	
2020–21	5	Reg. Pref.	1st	
2021–22	5	3ª RFEF	16th	
2022–23	6	Reg. Pref.	1st	
2023–24	6	Lliga Com.	15th	
2024–25	7	1ª FFCV	9th	
2025–26	7	1ª FFCV	5th	

Season	Tier	Division	Place	Copa del Rey
2026–27	7	1ª FFCV		

- 13 seasons in Tercera División
- 1 season in Tercera División RFEF
