= CE Alaior =

Alaior
- Full name: Club Esportiu Alaior
- Founded: 1934
- Ground: Los Pinos, Alaior, Menorca, Balearic Islands, Spain
- Capacity: 2,500
- Chairman: Antonio Alzina
- Manager: Ramón Melià
- League: División de Honor – Menorca
- 2025–26: División de Honor – Menorca, 3rd of 11
Home colours	Away colours

Club Esportiu Alaior is a Spanish football team based in Alaior, Menorca, in the autonomous community of Balearic Islands. Founded in 1934, it plays in División de Honor – Menorca, holding home games at Estadio Los Pinos, with a capacity of 2,500 seats.

== History ==
Alaior is one of several teams that have played most seasons in the fourth division, appearing a total of 47 seasons in the category.

The club has never qualified for the promotion playoffs to the third level since those were introduced in 1991. Their highest position was second, in the 1989–90 season.

== Season to season ==
Season	Tier	Division	Place	Copa del Rey
1934–1943	—	Regional	—	
1943–44	4	1ª Reg.	1st	
1944–45	4	1ª Reg.	1st	
1945–46	4	1ª Reg.	4th	
1946–47	4	1ª Reg.	6th	
1947–48	4	1ª Reg.	1st	
1948–49	4	1ª Reg.	7th	
1949–50	4	1ª Reg.		
1950–51	4	1ª Reg.	5th	
1951–52	4	1ª Reg.		
1952–53	4	1ª Reg.	3rd	
1953–54	4	1ª Reg.		
1954–55	3	3ª	5th	
1955–56	3	3ª	3rd	
1956–57	3	3ª	12th	
1957–58	3	3ª	12th	
1958–59	3	3ª	11th	
1959–60	3	3ª	12th	
1960–61	3	3ª	13th	
1961–62	3	3ª	4th	

Season	Tier	Division	Place	Copa del Rey
1962–63	3	3ª	6th	
1963–64	3	3ª	7th	
1964–65	3	3ª	9th	
1965–66	3	3ª	9th	
1966–67	3	3ª	9th	
1967–68	3	3ª	12th	
1968–69	4	1ª Reg.	2nd	
1969–70	4	1ª Reg.		
1970–71	4	1ª Reg.	5th	
1971–72	4	1ª Reg.	3rd	
1972–73	4	Reg. Pref.		
1973–74	4	Reg. Pref.		
1974–75	4	Reg. Pref.	2nd	
1975–76	4	Reg. Pref.	6th	
1976–77	4	Reg. Pref.	4th	
1977–78	5	Reg. Pref.		
1978–79	5	Reg. Pref.		
1979–80	4	3ª	18th	
1980–81	4	3ª	16th	
1981–82	4	3ª	14th	

Season	Tier	Division	Place	Copa del Rey
1982–83	4	3ª	13th	
1983–84	4	3ª	9th	
1984–85	4	3ª	11th	
1985–86	4	3ª	16th	
1986–87	4	3ª	7th	
1987–88	4	3ª	5th	
1988–89	4	3ª	3rd	
1989–90	4	3ª	2nd	
1990–91	4	3ª	5th	First round
1991–92	4	3ª	11th	First round
1992–93	4	3ª	7th	
1993–94	4	3ª	15th	
1994–95	4	3ª	15th	
1995–96	4	3ª	16th	
1996–97	4	3ª	15th	
1997–98	4	3ª	10th	
1998–99	4	3ª	7th	
1999–2000	4	3ª	14th	
2000–01	4	3ª	12th	
2001–02	4	3ª	13th	

Season	Tier	Division	Place	Copa del Rey
2002–03	4	3ª	7th	
2003–04	4	3ª	17th	
2004–05	4	3ª	16th	
2005–06	4	3ª	14th	
2006–07	4	3ª	14th	
2007–08	4	3ª	16th	
2008–09	4	3ª	13th	
2009–10	4	3ª	13th	
2010–11	4	3ª	17th	
2011–12	4	3ª	20th	
2012–13	5	Reg. Pref.	4th	
2013–14	5	Reg. Pref.	3rd	
2014–15	5	Reg. Pref.	2nd	
2015–16	5	Reg. Pref.	1st	
2016–17	5	Reg. Pref.	5th	
2017–18	5	Reg. Pref.	7th	
2018–19	5	Reg. Pref.	5th	
2019–20	5	Reg. Pref.	2nd	
2020–21	5	Reg. Pref.	3rd	
2021–22	6	Reg. Pref.	2nd	

Season	Tier	Division	Place	Copa del Rey
2022–23	6	Reg. Pref.	1st	
2023–24	5	3ª Fed.	15th	
2024–25	6	Div. Hon.	2nd	
2025–26	6	Div. Hon.		

- 47 seasons in Tercera División
- 1 season in Tercera Federación
