= Racing San Lorenzo =

Spanish football club

- Full name: Racing San Lorenzo
- Founded: 1928 (as Racing Club San Lorenzo)
- Ground: Campo de la USC, Santiago de Compostela, A Coruña, Galicia, Spain
- Capacity: 1,000
- League: Primera Futgal – Group 2
- 2024–25: Segunda Futgal – Santiago Group 1, 2nd of 16 (promoted via play-offs)
Home colours	Away colours

Racing San Lorenzo is a football team based in Santiago de Compostela, A Coruña, in the autonomous community of Galicia. Founded in 1928, they play in Primera Futgal – Group 2.

== History ==
Founded in 1928 as Racing Club San Lorenzo, the club was renamed Club Santiago in 1941, one year after their first senior season in the Serie A, the top tier of Galician regional football. They first achieved promotion to Tercera División two years later, and spent 12 consecutive seasons in the third tier before suffering relegation.

After an immediate return to Tercera in 1956, Santiago played six more seasons in the division before suffering relegation in 1962 and being renamed Racing Club San Lorenzo Club de Fútbol. The club only played another senior season in 2008, playing for three years in the Terceira Autonómica de Galicia, before subsequently focusing only on youth football.

In 2014, the senior squad returned to an active status.

== Season to season ==
Season	Tier	Division	Place	Copa del Rey
1929–1940	—	Regional	—	
1940–41	4	Serie A	5th	
1941–42	3	Serie A	2nd	
1942–43	3	Serie A	1st	
1943–44	3	3ª	5th	First round
1944–45	3	3ª	5th	
1945–46	3	3ª	7th	
1946–47	3	3ª	4th	
1947–48	3	3ª	10th	Third round
1948–49	3	3ª	12th	First round
1949–50	3	3ª	11th	
1950–51	3	3ª	16th	
1951–52	3	3ª	11th	
1952–53	3	3ª	14th	
1953–54	3	3ª	17th	
1954–55	3	3ª	10th	
1955–56	4	Serie A	3rd	
1956–57	3	3ª	11th	
1957–58	3	3ª	6th	
1958–59	3	3ª	14th	

Season	Tier	Division	Place	Copa del Rey
1959–60	3	3ª	13th	
1960–61	3	3ª	12th	
1961–62	3	3ª	16th	
1962–2005	DNP			
2005–06	8	3ª Reg.	5th	
2006–07	8	3ª Aut.	9th	
2007–08	DNP			
2008–09	8	3ª Aut.	16th	
2009–10	8	3ª Aut.	13th	
2010–11	8	3ª Aut.	10th	
2011–12	DNP			
2012–13	DNP			
2013–14	DNP			
2014–15	8	3ª Aut.	14th	
2015–16	8	3ª Aut.	12th	
2016–17	8	3ª Gal.	7th	
2017–18	8	3ª Gal.	7th	
2018–19	8	3ª Gal.	8th	
2019–20	8	3ª Gal.	3rd	
2020–21	DNP			

Season	Tier	Division	Place	Copa del Rey
2021–22	8	2ª Gal.	9th	
2022–23	9	3ª Gal.	6th	
2023–24	9	3ª Gal.	3rd	
2024–25	8	2ª Futgal	2nd	
2025–26	7	1ª Futgal		

- 19 seasons in Tercera División
