= CD Murense =

Spanish association football club

Murense
- Full name: Club Deportivo Murense
- Founded: 1944
- Ground: Municipal, Muro, Mallorca; Balearic Islands, Spain
- Capacity: 3,000
- President: Andreu Cantarellas
- Head coach: Toni Font
- League: Preferente Regional – Mallorca
- 2025–26: Preferente Regional – Mallorca, 2nd of 18
Home colours	Away colours

Club Deportivo Murense is a Spanish football team based in Muro, Mallorca, in the autonomous community of the Balearic Islands. Founded in 1944, they currently play in Preferente Regional – Mallorca, holding home matches at the Camp Municipal de Muro, with a capacity of 3,000 people.

== Season to season ==
Season	Tier	Division	Place	Copa del Rey
1944–45	6	3ª Reg.	1st	
1945–46	6	3ª Reg.		
1946–47	6	3ª Reg. I.	2nd	
1947–48	5	3ª Reg.	3rd	
1948–49	4	1ª Reg.	4th	
1949–50	4	1ª Reg.	1st	
1950–51	4	1ª Reg.	8th	
1951–52	5	3ª Reg.	6th	
1952–53	5	3ª Reg.	5th	
1953–54	5	3ª Reg.		
1954–55	4	1ª Reg.	9th	
1955–56	4	1ª Reg.	1st	
1956–57	3	3ª	13th	
1957–58	3	3ª	13th	
1958–59	3	3ª	16th	
1959–60	3	3ª	13th	
1960–61	3	3ª	16th	
1961–62	4	1ª Reg.		
1962–63	DNP			
1963–64	DNP			

Season	Tier	Division	Place	Copa del Rey
1964–65	4	1ª Reg.	7th	
1965–66	DNP			
1966–67	DNP			
1967–68	4	1ª Reg.	1st	
1968–69	4	1ª Reg.	2nd	
1969–70	4	1ª Reg.	12th	
1970–71	4	1ª Reg.	1st	
1971–72	4	1ª Reg.	2nd	
1972–73	4	Reg. Pref.	1st	
1973–74	5	1ª Reg.	2nd	
1974–75	5	1ª Reg.	1st	
1975–76	4	Reg. Pref.	3rd	
1976–77	4	Reg. Pref.	3rd	
1977–78	5	Reg. Pref.	1st	
1978–79	5	Reg. Pref.	4th	
1979–80	4	3ª	6th	First round
1980–81	4	3ª	5th	First round
1981–82	4	3ª	9th	Second round
1982–83	4	3ª	6th	
1983–84	4	3ª	5th	First round

Season	Tier	Division	Place	Copa del Rey
1984–85	4	3ª	2nd	Second round
1985–86	4	3ª	12th	First round
1986–87	4	3ª	12th	
1987–88	4	3ª	8th	
1988–89	4	3ª	21st	
1989–90	5	Reg. Pref.	15th	
1990–91	5	Reg. Pref.	16th	
1991–92	5	Reg. Pref.	9th	
1992–93	5	Reg. Pref.	8th	
1993–94	5	Reg. Pref.	5th	
1994–95	5	Reg. Pref.	20th	
1995–96	6	1ª Reg.	15th	
1996–97	6	1ª Reg.	7th	
1997–98	6	1ª Reg.	3rd	
1998–99	6	1ª Reg.	1st	
1999–2000	5	Reg. Pref.	11th	
2000–01	5	Reg. Pref.	20th	
2001–02	6	1ª Reg.	18th	
2002–03	7	2ª Reg.	9th	
2003–04	7	2ª Reg.	1st	

Season	Tier	Division	Place	Copa del Rey
2004–05	6	1ª Reg.	2nd	
2005–06	5	Reg. Pref.	12th	
2006–07	5	Reg. Pref.	17th	
2007–08	5	Reg. Pref.	6th	
2008–09	5	Reg. Pref.	10th	
2009–10	5	Reg. Pref.	11th	
2010–11	5	Reg. Pref.	7th	
2011–12	5	Reg. Pref.	10th	
2012–13	5	Reg. Pref.	12th	
2013–14	5	Reg. Pref.	17th	
2014–15	5	Reg. Pref.	13th	
2015–16	5	Reg. Pref.	9th	
2016–17	5	Reg. Pref.	11th	
2017–18	5	Reg. Pref.	2nd	
2018–19	4	3ª	21st	
2019–20	5	Reg. Pref.	13th	
2020–21	5	Reg. Pref.	2nd	
2021–22	5	3ª RFEF	20th	
2022–23	6	Reg. Pref.	13th	
2023–24	6	Reg. Pref.	10th	

Season	Tier	Division	Place	Copa del Rey
2024–25	7	Pref. Reg.	5th	
2025–26	7	Pref. Reg.		

- 16 seasons in Tercera División
- 1 season in Tercera División RFEF
