= Ordizia KE =

Spanish football club

Coordinates: 43.052700°N 2.172598°W

Ordizia
- Full name: Ordizia Kirol Elkartea
- Founded: 1941
- Ground: Estadio Municipal de Altamira, Ordizia, Basque Country, Spain
- Capacity: 2,000
- Chairman: Migel Jauregi
- Manager: Rubén Vázquez
- League: Preferente – Group 2
- 2024–25: Preferente – Group 2, 3rd of 16
Home colours	Away colours

Ordizia Kirol Elkartea is a football team based in Ordizia in the autonomous community of Basque Country. Founded in 1941, the team plays in Preferente – Group 2. The club's home ground is Altamira, which has a capacity of 2,000 spectators.

== History ==
- Villafranca Unión Club - (1941-1991)
- Ordizia Kirol Elkartea - (1991-currently)

== Season to season ==
Season	Tier	Division	Place	Copa del Rey
1941–42	4	2ª Reg.	2nd	
1942–43	3	1ª Reg.	5th	
1943–44	4	1ª Reg.	1st	
1944–45	4	1ª Reg.	1st	
1945–46	4	1ª Reg.	1st	
1946–47	3	3ª	6th	
1947–48	4	1ª Reg.	4th	
1948–49	4	1ª Reg.	4th	
1949–50	4	1ª Reg.	3rd	
1950–51	4	1ª Reg.	7th	
1951–52	4	1ª Reg.	5th	
1952–53	4	1ª Reg.	5th	
1953–54	4	1ª Reg.	2nd	
1954–55	3	3ª	4th	
1955–56	3	3ª	2nd	
1956–57	3	3ª	3rd	
1957–58	3	3ª	14th	
1958–59	3	3ª	10th	
1959–60	3	3ª	10th	
1960–61	3	3ª	11th	

Season	Tier	Division	Place	Copa del Rey
1961–62	3	3ª	9th	
1962–63	3	3ª	15th	
1963–64	4	1ª Reg.	4th	
1964–65	4	1ª Reg.	1st	
1965–66	3	3ª	16th	
1966–67	4	1ª Reg.	3rd	
1967–68	4	1ª Reg.	5th	
1968–69	4	1ª Reg.	7th	
1969–70	4	1ª Reg.	7th	
1970–71	4	1ª Reg.	8th	
1971–72	4	1ª Reg.	8th	
1972–73	4	1ª Reg.	16th	
1973–74	5	2ª Reg.	17th	
1974–75	DNP			
1975–76	5	1ª Reg.	12th	
1976–77	6	2ª Reg.	3rd	
1977–78	6	1ª Reg.	3rd	
1978–79	5	Reg. Pref.	17th	
1979–80	5	Reg. Pref.	6th	
1980–81	5	Reg. Pref.	10th	

Season	Tier	Division	Place	Copa del Rey
1981–82	5	Reg. Pref.	5th	
1982–83	5	Reg. Pref.	3rd	
1983–84	5	Reg. Pref.	3rd	
1984–85	5	Reg. Pref.	13th	
1985–86	5	Reg. Pref.	12th	
1986–87	5	Reg. Pref.	16th	
1987–88	5	Reg. Pref.	16th	
1988–89	5	Reg. Pref.	18th	
1989–90	6	1ª Reg.	2nd	
1990–91	5	Reg. Pref.	8th	
1991–92	5	Reg. Pref.	15th	
1992–93	5	Reg. Pref.	18th	
1993–94	6	1ª Reg.	3rd	
1994–95	5	Reg. Pref.	15th	
1995–96	5	Reg. Pref.	13th	
1996–97	5	Reg. Pref.	11th	
1997–98	5	Reg. Pref.	19th	
1998–99	6	1ª Reg.	15th	
1999–2000	7	2ª Reg.	1st	
2000–01	6	1ª Reg.	1st	

Season	Tier	Division	Place	Copa del Rey
2001–02	5	Reg. Pref.	16th	
2002–03	5	Reg. Pref.	15th	
2003–04	5	Reg. Pref.	17th	
2004–05	5	Reg. Pref.	4th	
2005–06	5	Reg. Pref.	5th	
2006–07	5	Reg. Pref.	5th	
2007–08	5	Reg. Pref.	1st	
2008–09	4	3ª	18th	
2009–10	5	Div. Hon.	15th	
2010–11	5	Div. Hon.	18th	
2011–12	6	Pref.	7th	
2012–13	6	Pref.	3rd	
2013–14	6	Pref.	1st	
2014–15	5	Div. Hon.	13th	
2015–16	5	Div. Hon.	14th	
2016–17	5	Div. Hon.	4th	
2017–18	5	Div. Hon.	2nd	
2018–19	4	3ª	18th	
2019–20	5	Div. Hon.	14th	
2020–21	5	Div. Hon.	9th	

Season	Tier	Division	Place	Copa del Rey
2021–22	6	Div. Hon.	16th	
2022–23	7	Pref.	2nd	
2023–24	6	Div. Hon.	18th	
2024–25	7	Pref.	3rd	
2025–26	7	Pref.		

- 13 seasons in Tercera División
