= CD Cieza =

Spanish football club

Cieza
- Full name: Club Deportivo Cieza
- Founded: 1923; 1952 (refounded); 1969 (refounded)
- Ground: La Arboleja, Cieza, Murcia, Spain
- Capacity: 3,500
- Chairman: (Spain) Antonio García
- Manager: (Serbia) Ranko Despotović
- League: Segunda Federación – Group 3
- 2025–26: Tercera Federación – Group 13, 1st of 18 (champions)
Home colours	Away colours

Club Deportivo Cieza is a Spanish football team based in Murcia, in the autonomous community of Region of Murcia. Founded in 1969 it plays in Segunda Federación – Group 3, holding home games at Estadio Municipal La Arboleja, with a capacity of 3,500 seats.

== History ==
Founded in 1923, the club played its first match on 15 of april 1923 against Caravaca FC, the local team scored 2-1. In 1924 the club played in the Federación Murciana de Fútbol. Later the club played in one Tercera División season in 1932–33 before ceasing activities in 1936 due to the Spanish Civil War. Four years later, after the war ended, the club returned to an active status, and returned to the third tier in 1943.

After eight consecutive seasons in Tercera, Cieza folded in 1951. The following year, the club was refounded as Educación y Descanso Cieza, returning to the third division in 1955 (already renamed to Cieza Club de Fútbol) and remaining in the category for 13 campaigns.

In 1969, after Cieza's dissolution in the previous year, the club was refounded, but only started playing in a senior competition in 1970. They achieved promotion to Tercera División in 1980, and achieved a first-ever promotion to Segunda División B in 1987.

In the season 2025–26 the club finished first and won the Tercera Federación Group XIII and got promoted to Segunda Federación for its first time in history.

=== Club background ===
- Club Deportivo Cieza (1923–1936; 1940–1951; 1962–1968; 1969–)
- Educación y Descanso Cieza (1952–1954)
- Cieza Club de Fútbol (1954–1962)

== Season to season ==
Season	Tier	Division	Place	Copa del Rey
1930–31	6	3ª Reg.	1st	
1931–32	5	2ª Reg.	2nd	
1932–33	3	3ª	2nd	
1933–34	5	2ª Reg.	2nd	
1934–35	5	2ª Reg.	3rd	
1935–36	5	2ª Reg.		
1940–41	5	2ª Reg.	1st	
1941–42	3	1ª Reg.	2nd	
1942–43	3	1ª Reg.	7th	
1943–44	3	3ª	7th	
1944–45	3	3ª	5th	
1945–46	3	3ª	8th	
1946–47	3	3ª	7th	
1947–48	3	3ª	9th	
1948–49	3	3ª	14th	
1949–50	3	3ª	11th	
1950–51	3	3ª	17th	
1951–52	DNP			
1952–53	4	1ª Reg.	3rd	
1953–54	4	1ª Reg.	17th	

Season	Tier	Division	Place	Copa del Rey
1954–55	4	1ª Reg.	1st	
1955–56	3	3ª	12th	
1956–57	3	3ª	13th	
1957–58	3	3ª	12th	
1958–59	3	3ª	12th	
1959–60	3	3ª	10th	
1960–61	3	3ª	9th	
1961–62	3	3ª	9th	
1962–63	3	3ª	6th	
1963–64	3	3ª	6th	
1964–65	3	3ª	11th	
1965–66	3	3ª	12th	
1966–67	3	3ª	6th	
1967–68	3	3ª	16th	
1968–69	DNP			
1969–70	DNP			
1970–71	5	2ª Reg.	4th	
1971–72	5	1ª Reg.	1st	
1972–73	4	Reg. Pref.	6th	
1973–74	4	Reg. Pref.	13th	

Season	Tier	Division	Place	Copa del Rey
1974–75	4	Reg. Pref.	6th	
1975–76	4	Reg. Pref.	11th	
1976–77	4	Reg. Pref.	13th	
1977–78	5	Reg. Pref.	14th	
1978–79	5	Reg. Pref.	3rd	
1979–80	5	Reg. Pref.	1st	
1980–81	4	3ª	13th	
1981–82	4	3ª	5th	
1982–83	4	3ª	11th	First round
1983–84	4	3ª	15th	
1984–85	4	3ª	2nd	
1985–86	4	3ª	10th	First round
1986–87	4	3ª	1st	
1987–88	3	2ª B	20th	First round
1988–89	4	3ª	7th	First round
1989–90	4	3ª	12th	
1990–91	4	3ª	16th	
1991–92	4	3ª	11th	
1992–93	4	3ª	1st	
1993–94	3	2ª B	19th	First round

Season	Tier	Division	Place	Copa del Rey
1994–95	4	3ª	11th	First round
1995–96	4	3ª	18th	
1996–97	5	Terr. Pref.	4th	
1997–98	4	3ª	11th	
1998–99	4	3ª	12th	
1999–2000	4	3ª	10th	
2000–01	4	3ª	20th	
2001–02	5	Terr. Pref.	7th	
2002–03	5	Terr. Pref.	11th	
2003–04	5	Terr. Pref.	3rd	
2004–05	4	3ª	18th	
2005–06	5	Terr. Pref.	6th	
2006–07	5	Terr. Pref.	2nd	
2007–08	4	3ª	10th	
2008–09	4	3ª	7th	
2009–10	4	3ª	7th	
2010–11	4	3ª	5th	
2011–12	4	3ª	5th	
2012–13	4	3ª	2nd	
2013–14	4	3ª	11th	

Season	Tier	Division	Place	Copa del Rey
2014–15	4	3ª	18th	
2015–16	5	Pref. Aut.	4th	
2016–17	4	3ª	11th	
2017–18	4	3ª	15th	
2018–19	4	3ª	22nd	
2019–20	5	Pref. Aut.	11th	
2020–21	5	Pref. Aut.	5th	
2021–22	6	Pref. Aut.	2nd	
2022–23	5	3ª Fed.	9th	
2023–24	5	3ª Fed.	3rd	
2024–25	5	3ª Fed.	2nd	
2025–26	5	3ª Fed.	1st	Second round
2026–27	4	2ª Fed.		First round

- 2 seasons in Segunda División B
- 2 seasons in Segunda Federación
- 52 seasons in Tercera División
- 4 seasons in Tercera Federación

== Honours ==
- Tercera División: 1986–87, 1992–93
- Tercera Federación: 2025–26

== Famous players ==
- (Spain) David Karanka
