= Alcázar CF =

Spanish football team

Alcázar
- Full name: Alcázar Club de Fútbol
- Founded: 1953
- Dissolved: 1975
- Ground: Municipal, Alcázar de San Juan, Castilla–La Mancha, Spain
- Capacity: 5,000
- 1974–75: Primera Regional Ordinaria Castellana, 20th of 20
Home colours

Alcázar Club de Fútbol was a Spanish football team based in Alcázar de San Juan, Ciudad Real, in the autonomous community of Castilla–La Mancha. Founded in 1953 and dissolved in 1975, they last played in Primera Regional Ordinaria Castellana, holding home games at Estadio Municipal de Alcázar, with a capacity of 5,000 seats.

== History ==
Alcázar CF was founded in 1953, taking the vacant place of Gimnástico CF which ceased activities in 1949. The club played in the regional leagues until 1956, when they achieved a first-ever promotion to Tercera División.

In 1967, the club was renamed Askar CF after being sponsored by home appliances company Askar. The sponsorship ended in 1969 as the club suffered relegation, and Alcázar ceased activities in 1975. In the meantime, CF Gimnástico de Alcázar was refounded in 1972 and began to rise the categories afterwards.

== Season to season ==
Season	Tier	Division	Place	Copa del Rey
1953–54	4	1ª Reg.	7th	
1954–55	DNP			
1955–56	4	1ª Reg.	1st	
1956–57	3	3ª	11th	
1957–58	3	3ª	5th	
1958–59	3	3ª	7th	
1959–60	3	3ª	5th	
1960–61	3	3ª	7th	
1961–62	3	3ª	9th	
1962–63	3	3ª	12th	
1963–64	3	3ª	12th	

Season	Tier	Division	Place	Copa del Rey
1964–65	3	3ª	13th	
1965–66	3	3ª	15th	
1966–67	3	3ª	10th	
1967–68	3	3ª	7th	
1968–69	3	3ª	20th	
1969–70	4	1ª Reg.	5th	
1970–71	4	1ª Reg.	16th	
1971–72	4	1ª Reg.	(R)	
1972–73	4	1ª Reg.	7th	
1973–74	4	Reg. Pref.	10th	
1974–75	5	1ª Reg.	20th	

- 13 seasons in Tercera División
