= CD Béjar Industrial =

Spanish football team

Béjar Industrial
- Full name: Club Deportivo Béjar Industrial
- Founded: 1951
- Ground: Mario Emilio, Béjar, Castile and León, Spain
- Capacity: 2,000
- Chairman: Ildefonso Sánchez Vicente
- Manager: Manolo Gallego
- League: Primera Regional – Group B
- 2025–26: Primera Regional – Group B, 10th of 16
Home colours	Away colours

Club Deportivo Béjar Industrial is a Spanish football team based in Béjar, in the autonomous community of Castile and León. Founded in 1951, it plays in Primera Regional – Group B, holding home matches at Campo de Fútbol Mario Emilio.

== Season to season ==
Season	Tier	Division	Place	Copa del Rey
1953–54	4	1ª Reg.	2nd	
1954–55	4	1ª Reg.		
1955–56	3	3ª	9th	
1956–57	3	3ª	11th	
1957–58	3	3ª	6th	
1958–59	3	3ª	9th	
1959–60	3	3ª	9th	
1960–61	3	3ª	11th	
1961–62	3	3ª	1st	
1962–63	3	3ª	1st	
1963–64	3	3ª	1st	
1964–65	3	3ª	2nd	
1965–66	3	3ª	11th	
1966–67	3	3ª	4th	
1967–68	3	3ª	5th	
1968–69	3	3ª	19th	
1969–70	4	1ª Reg.	1st	
1970–71	4	Reg. Pref.	3rd	
1971–72	4	Reg. Pref.	1st	
1972–73	3	3ª	19th	First round

Season	Tier	Division	Place	Copa del Rey
1973–74	4	Reg. Pref.	1st	
1974–75	3	3ª	17th	Second round
1975–76	4	Reg. Pref.	8th	
1976–77	4	Reg. Pref.	6th	
1977–78	5	Reg. Pref.	2nd	
1978–79	5	Reg. Pref.	1st	
1979–80	4	3ª	8th	First round
1980–81	4	3ª	3rd	First round
1981–82	4	3ª	18th	First round
1982–83	5	Reg. Pref.	6th	
1983–84	5	Reg. Pref.	2nd	
1984–85	4	3ª	15th	
1985–86	4	3ª	16th	
1986–87	4	3ª	18th	
1987–88	5	Reg. Pref.	4th	
1988–89	5	Reg. Pref.	5th	
1989–90	5	Reg. Pref.	2nd	
1990–91	5	Reg. Pref.	2nd	
1991–92	4	3ª	14th	
1992–93	4	3ª	15th	

Season	Tier	Division	Place	Copa del Rey
1993–94	4	3ª	18th	
1994–95	5	Reg. Pref.	13th	
1995–96	5	Reg. Pref.	1st	
1996–97	4	3ª	17th	
1997–98	4	3ª	16th	
1998–99	4	3ª	13th	
1999–2000	4	3ª	4th	
2000–01	4	3ª	13th	
2000–01	4	3ª	13th	
2001–02	4	3ª	15th	
2002–03	4	3ª	19th	
2003–04	5	1ª Reg.	12th	
2004–05	5	1ª Reg.	7th	
2005–06	5	1ª Reg.	3rd	
2006–07	5	1ª Reg.	7th	
2007–08	5	1ª Reg.	11th	
2008–09	5	1ª Reg.	12th	
2009–10	5	1ª Reg.	5th	
2010–11	5	1ª Reg.	3rd	
2011–12	4	3ª	20th	
2012–13	5	1ª Reg.	11th	

Season	Tier	Division	Place	Copa del Rey
2013–14	5	1ª Reg.	9th	
2014–15	5	1ª Reg.	11th	
2015–16	5	1ª Reg.	6th	
2016–17	5	1ª Reg.	6th	
2017–18	5	1ª Reg.	12th	
2018–19	5	1ª Reg.	7th	
2019–20	5	1ª Reg.	8th	
2020–21	5	1ª Reg.	6th	
2021–22	6	1ª Reg.	15th	
2022–23	7	1ª Prov.	1st	
2023–24	6	1ª Reg.	7th	
2024–25	6	1ª Reg.	5th	
2025–26	6	1ª Reg.		

- 33 seasons in Tercera División
