= Puerto Real CF =

Puerto Real
- Full name: Puerto Real Club de Fútbol
- Nickname: Castellanos
- Founded: 1931
- Ground: Ciudad Deportiva Bahía de Cádiz, Puerto Real, Spain
- Capacity: 2,500
- President: (Spain) Antonio Bohórquez
- Head coach: (Spain) Juan Manuel Cruz
- League: Primera Andaluza Cádiz
- 2024–25: Primera Andaluza Cádiz, 11th of 16
Home colours	Away colours

Puerto Real Club de Fútbol is a football team based in Puerto Real, Province of Cádiz, Spain. Founded in 1948, the team plays in Primera Andaluza Cádiz.

The club's home ground is Ciudad Deportiva Bahía de Cádiz.

== Season to season ==
Season	Tier	Division	Place	Copa del Rey
1931–1942	—	Regional	—	
1942–43	4	2ª Reg.	3rd	
1943–44	3	1ª Reg.	2nd	
1944–45	4	1ª Reg.	5th	
1945–46	4	1ª Reg.		
1946–47	4	1ª Reg.		
1947–48	4	1ª Reg.	12th	
1948–49	4	1ª Reg.	13th	
1949–50	4	1ª Reg.	12th	
1950–51	4	1ª Reg.		
1951–52	4	1ª Reg.	10th	
1952–53	4	1ª Reg.	14th	
1953–54	4	1ª Reg.	13th	
1954–55	4	1ª Reg.	2nd	
1955–56	4	1ª Reg.	1st	
1956–57	3	3ª	9th	
1957–58	3	3ª	8th	
1958–59	3	3ª	12th	
1959–60	3	3ª	7th	
1960–61	3	3ª	13th	

Season	Tier	Division	Place	Copa del Rey
1961–62	3	3ª	7th	
1962–63	3	3ª	10th	
1963–64	3	3ª	11th	
1964–65	3	3ª	10th	
1965–66	3	3ª	15th	
1966–67	4	1ª Reg.		
1967–68	4	1ª Reg.		
1968–69	4	1ª Reg.	1st	
1969–70	4	1ª Reg.	4th	
1970–71	4	1ª Reg.	4th	
1971–72	4	1ª Reg.	3rd	
1972–73	4	1ª Reg.	2nd	
1973–74	4	1ª Reg.	5th	
1974–75	4	1ª Reg.	6th	
1975–76	4	Reg. Pref.	4th	
1976–77	4	Reg. Pref.	5th	
1977–78	4	3ª	11th	First round
1978–79	4	3ª	9th	First round
1979–80	4	3ª	16th	First round
1980–81	4	3ª	8th	

Season	Tier	Division	Place	Copa del Rey
1981–82	4	3ª	9th	
1982–83	4	3ª	8th	
1983–84	4	3ª	13th	
1984–85	4	3ª	7th	
1985–86	4	3ª	20th	
1986–87	5	Reg. Pref.	5th	
1987–88	5	Reg. Pref.	1st	
1988–89	4	3ª	14th	
1989–90	4	3ª	17th	
1990–91	4	3ª	20th	
1991–92	5	Reg. Pref.	5th	
1992–93	5	Reg. Pref.	3rd	
1993–94	5	Reg. Pref.	5th	
1994–95	5	Reg. Pref.	6th	
1995–96	5	Reg. Pref.	3rd	
1996–97	5	Reg. Pref.	1st	
1997–98	4	3ª	13th	
1998–99	4	3ª	14th	
1999–2000	4	3ª	3rd	
2000–01	4	3ª	14th	

Season	Tier	Division	Place	Copa del Rey
2001–02	4	3ª	11th	
2002–03	4	3ª	21st	
2003–04	5	Reg. Pref.	2nd	
2004–05	4	3ª	10th	
2005–06	4	3ª	13th	
2006–07	4	3ª	11th	
2007–08	4	3ª	2nd	
2008–09	4	3ª	7th	
2009–10	4	3ª	13th	
2010–11	4	3ª	7th	
2011–12	5	1ª And.	2nd	
2012–13	5	1ª And.	6th	
2013–14	5	1ª And.	15th	
2014–15	6	2ª And.	10th	
2015–16	6	2ª And.	13th	
2016–17	7	2ª And.	5th	
2017–18	7	2ª And.	7th	
2018–19	7	2ª And.	2nd	
2019–20	6	1ª And.	1st	
2020–21	5	Div. Hon.	9th	

Season	Tier	Division	Place	Copa del Rey
2021–22	7	1ª And.	9th	
2022–23	7	1ª And.	4th	
2023–24	7	1ª And.	5th	
2024–25	7	1ª And.	11th	
2025–26	7	1ª And.	16th	
2026–27	8	2ª And.		

- 35 seasons in Tercera División

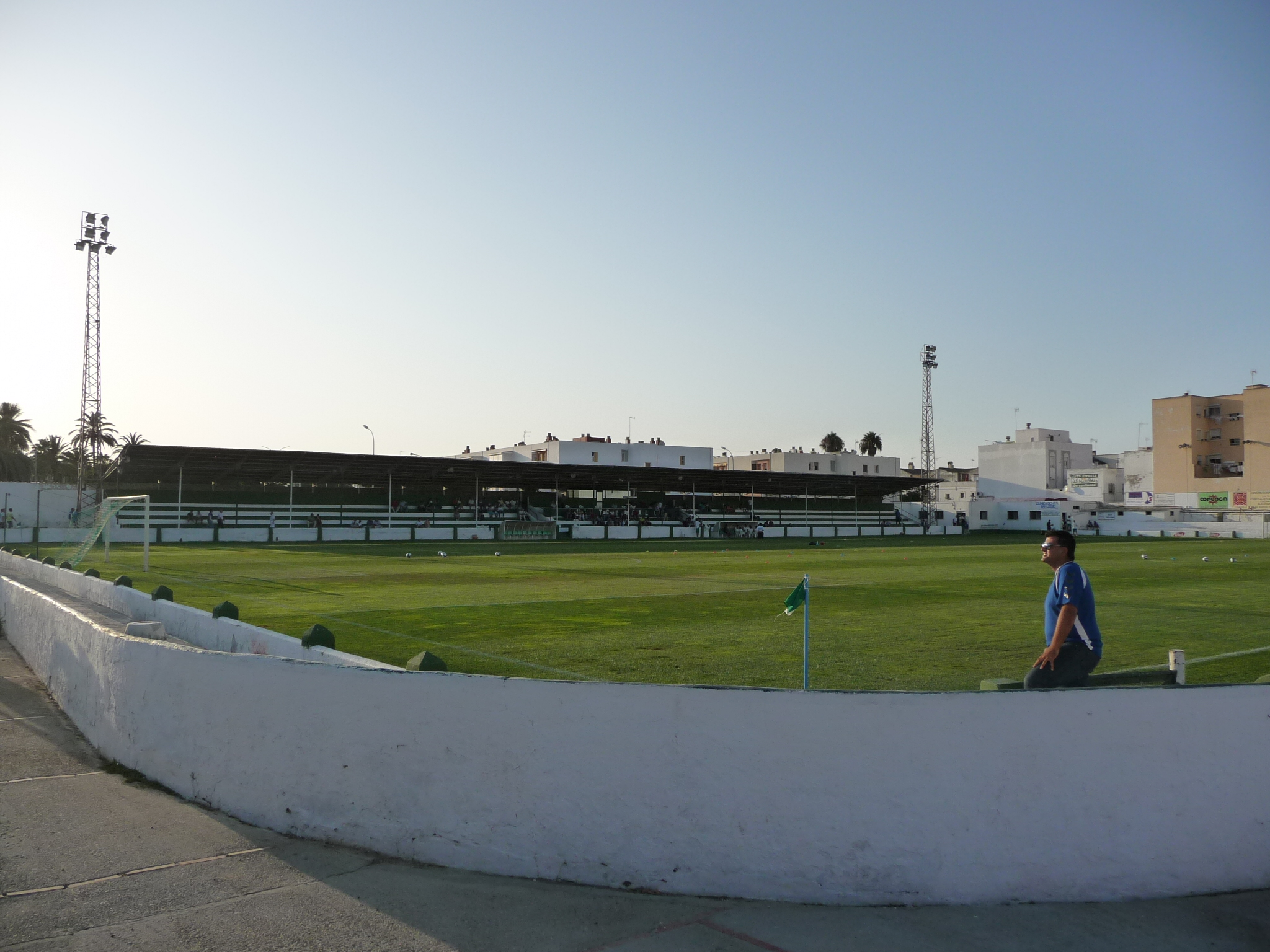
Estadio Sancho Dávila

== Notable former players ==
- (Spain) Francisco Luna
