= CD Galdakao =

Association football club in Spain

Galdakao
- Full name: Club Deportivo Galdakao
- Founded: 1914 (as Elexalde Club)
- Ground: Santa Bárbara, Galdakao, Biscay, Basque Country, Spain
- Capacity: 2,000
- President: Iñaki Larrea
- Head coach: Igor Núñez
- League: Preferente
- 2024–25: División de Honor, 16th of 18 (relegated)
Home colours	Away colours

Club Deportivo Galdakao is a Spanish football team based in Galdakao, in the autonomous community of Basque Country. Founded in 1914, it plays in Preferente, holding home games at Campo de Fútbol de Santa Bárbara, which has a capacity of 2,000 spectators.

== Season to season ==
Season	Tier	Division	Place	Copa del Rey
1928–29	5	2ª Reg. P.	2nd	
1929–30	5	2ª Reg. P.	5th	
1930–31	5	2ª Reg. P.	3rd	
1931–32	5	2ª Reg. P.	5th	
1932–33	5	2ª Reg. P.	8th	
1933–34	6	2ª Reg.	2nd	
1934–35	5	2ª Reg. P.	7th	
1935–36	5	2ª Reg. P.	3rd	
1939–40	DNP			
1940–41	6	2ª Reg.	2nd	
1941–42	4	1ª Reg. B	1st	
1942–43	3	1ª Reg.	7th	
1943–44	4	1ª Reg.	4th	
1944–45	4	1ª Reg.	4th	
1945–46	4	1ª Reg.	6th	
1946–47	4	1ª Reg.	7th	
1947–48	4	1ª Reg.	2nd	
1948–49	4	1ª Reg.	9th	
1949–50	4	1ª Reg.	8th	
1950–51	4	1ª Reg.	9th	

Season	Tier	Division	Place	Copa del Rey
1951–52	4	1ª Reg.	9th	
1952–53	4	1ª Reg.	12th	
1953–54	4	2ª Reg.	2nd	
1954–55	4	2ª Reg.	2nd	
1955–56	4	1ª Reg.	3rd	
1956–57	4	1ª Reg.	1st	
1957–58	3	3ª	2nd	
1958–59	3	3ª	3rd	
1959–60	3	3ª	4th	
1960–61	3	3ª	2nd	
1961–62	3	3ª	2nd	
1962–63	3	3ª	6th	
1963–64	3	3ª	15th	
1964–65	4	1ª Reg.	1st	
1965–66	3	3ª	12th	
1966–67	3	3ª	11th	
1967–68	3	3ª	16th	
1968–69	4	Reg. Pref.	12th	
1969–70	4	Reg. Pref.	2nd	
1970–71	4	Reg. Pref.	17th	

Season	Tier	Division	Place	Copa del Rey
1971–72	5	1ª Reg.	6th	
1972–73	4	Reg. Pref.	10th	
1973–74	4	Reg. Pref.	18th	
1974–75	5	1ª Reg.	4th	
1975–76	4	Reg. Pref.	16th	
1976–77	4	Reg. Pref.	10th	
1977–78	5	Reg. Pref.	4th	
1978–79	5	Reg. Pref.	18th	
1979–80	6	1ª Reg.	1st	
1980–81	5	Reg. Pref.	12th	
1981–82	5	Reg. Pref.	13th	
1982–83	5	Reg. Pref.	10th	
1983–84	5	Reg. Pref.	13th	
1984–85	5	Reg. Pref.	17th	
1985–86	6	1ª Reg.	1st	
1986–87	5	Reg. Pref.	2nd	
1987–88	4	3ª	16th	
1988–89	4	3ª	10th	
1989–90	4	3ª	13th	
1990–91	4	3ª	8th	

Season	Tier	Division	Place	Copa del Rey
1991–92	4	3ª	17th	First round
1992–93	4	3ª	19th	
1993–94	5	Terr. Pref.	16th	
1994–95	6	1ª Terr.	15th	
1995–96	6	1ª Terr.	11th	
1996–97	6	1ª Terr.	5th	
1997–98	6	1ª Terr.	6th	
1998–99	6	1ª Terr.	3rd	
1999–2000	6	1ª Terr.	16th	
2000–01	6	1ª Terr.	10th	
2001–02	6	1ª Terr.	8th	
2002–03	6	Pref.	10th	
2003–04	6	Pref.	15th	
2004–05	6	Pref.	2nd	
2005–06	5	Div. Hon.	14th	
2006–07	6	Pref.	5th	
2007–08	6	Pref.	3rd	
2008–09	5	Div. Hon.	16th	
2009–10	5	Div. Hon.	7th	
2010–11	5	Div. Hon.	13th	

Season	Tier	Division	Place	Copa del Rey
2011–12	5	Div. Hon.	17th	
2012–13	6	Pref.	17th	
2013–14	7	1ª Div.	4th	
2014–15	7	1ª Div.	2nd	
2015–16	6	Pref.	11th	
2016–17	6	Pref.	1st	
2017–18	5	Div. Hon.	7th	
2018–19	5	Div. Hon.	11th	
2019–20	5	Div. Hon.	17th	
2020–21	5	Div. Hon.	3rd	
2021–22	6	Div. Hon.	7th	
2022–23	6	Div. Hon.	15th	
2023–24	6	Div. Hon.	7th	
2024–25	6	Div. Hon.	16th	
2025–26	7	Pref.		

- 16 seasons in Tercera División
