= 1960–61 Tercera División =

Tercera División
- Season: 1960–61
- Champions: 14 teams
- Promoted: 7 teams
- Relegated: 31 teams

The 1960–61 Tercera División season was the 25th since its establishment.

== League tables ==
=== Group I ===
Pos	Team	Pld	W	D	L	GF	GA	GD	Pts
1	Racing de Ferrol	30	24	3	3	103	27	+76	51
2	Lugo	30	20	3	7	73	35	+38	43
3	Turista	30	15	6	9	56	42	+14	36
4	Lemos	30	15	4	11	37	34	+3	34
5	Viveiro	30	13	7	10	47	41	+6	33
6	Arsenal	30	13	6	11	49	37	+12	32
7	Marín	30	13	6	11	49	49	0	32
8	Choco	30	11	6	13	52	57	−5	28
9	Arosa	30	12	4	14	54	46	+8	28
10	Gran Peña	30	12	3	15	47	52	−5	27
11	Santiago	30	11	5	14	36	44	−8	27
12	Fabril	30	11	5	14	39	62	−23	27
13	Coruxo	30	9	8	13	50	69	−19	26
14	Zeltia	30	11	2	17	53	69	−16	24
15	Órdenes	30	6	10	14	37	54	−17	22
16	Flavia	30	3	4	23	20	84	−64	10

=== Group II ===
Pos	Team	Pld	W	D	L	GF	GA	GD	Pts
1	La Felguera	30	23	3	4	67	22	+45	49
2	Real Avilés	30	24	1	5	87	30	+57	49
3	Langreano	30	16	4	10	65	48	+17	36
4	El Entrego	30	15	3	12	57	48	+9	33
5	Siero	30	14	5	11	60	50	+10	33
6	Caudal	30	15	3	12	52	40	+12	33
7	Lenense	30	11	7	12	42	63	−21	29
8	Turón	30	12	4	14	48	53	−5	28
9	Luarca	30	12	3	15	53	52	+1	27
10	Santiago de Aller	30	12	3	15	58	58	0	27
11	Calzada	30	10	6	14	50	52	−2	26
12	San Martín	30	9	8	13	58	62	−4	26
13	Pelayo	30	8	9	13	48	62	−14	25
14	Real Titánico	30	7	7	16	47	85	−38	21
15	Marino de Luanco	30	7	6	17	36	76	−40	20
16	Praviano	30	7	4	19	42	69	−27	18

=== Group III ===
Pos	Team	Pld	W	D	L	GF	GA	GD	Pts
1	Rayo Cantabria	30	21	5	4	79	20	+59	47
2	Galdakao	30	14	12	4	52	27	+25	40
3	Arenas de Getxo	30	15	6	9	48	36	+12	36
4	Laredo	30	14	8	8	44	30	+14	36
5	Getxo	30	14	8	8	59	46	+13	36
6	Durango	30	12	9	9	43	43	0	33
7	Gimnástica de Torrelavega	30	11	6	13	44	50	−6	28
8	SD Izarra	30	9	10	11	40	44	−4	28
9	Deusto	30	11	6	13	40	49	−9	28
10	Santoña	30	11	6	13	50	56	−6	28
11	Larramendi	30	10	7	13	42	44	−2	27
12	Erandio	30	10	7	13	57	62	−5	27
13	Unión	30	8	10	12	36	46	−10	26
14	Peña	30	9	7	14	34	44	−10	25
15	Balmaseda	30	10	3	17	34	59	−25	23
16	Naval	30	3	6	21	18	64	−46	12

=== Group IV ===
Pos	Team	Pld	W	D	L	GF	GA	GD	Pts
1	Alavés	30	20	5	5	87	25	+62	45
2	Vitoria	30	18	5	7	74	52	+22	41
3	Eibar	30	18	3	9	82	50	+32	39
4	Touring	30	15	7	8	60	36	+24	37
5	Real Unión	30	13	8	9	58	41	+17	34
6	Logroñés	30	14	3	13	50	51	−1	31
7	Alfaro	30	12	7	11	59	45	+14	31
8	Iruña	30	12	7	11	54	62	−8	31
9	Bergara	30	12	6	12	50	55	−5	30
10	Mirandés	30	12	5	13	53	58	−5	29
11	Villafranca	30	13	2	15	51	47	+4	28
12	Elgoibar	30	11	6	13	44	58	−14	28
13	Tolosa	30	12	3	15	51	63	−12	27
14	Beasain	30	5	7	18	47	79	−32	17
15	Recreación de Logroño	30	5	9	16	40	82	−42	16 (Note: 3 points deducted)
16	CD Izarra	30	5	3	22	30	86	−56	13

=== Group V ===
Pos	Team	Pld	W	D	L	GF	GA	GD	Pts
1	Amistad	30	19	5	6	76	31	+45	43
2	Arenas	30	18	5	7	68	34	+34	41
3	Numancia	30	16	6	8	64	46	+18	38
4	Juventud	30	16	5	9	69	50	+19	37
5	Triasú	30	16	4	10	51	49	+2	36
6	Alcañiz	30	16	3	11	57	32	+25	35
7	Atlético de Monzón	30	15	4	11	61	43	+18	34
8	Mequinenza	30	17	2	11	65	50	+15	33 (Note: 3 points deducted)
9	Caspe	30	14	3	13	35	40	−5	31
10	Ejea	30	14	2	14	51	57	−6	30
11	Calvo Sotelo Andorra	30	13	4	13	44	50	−6	30
12	Sabiñánigo	30	9	6	15	46	64	−18	24
13	Teruel	30	9	4	17	52	72	−20	22
14	Fraga	30	8	2	20	43	72	−29	18
15	Jaca	30	5	5	20	31	62	−31	13 (Note: 2 points deducted)
16	Calatayud	30	4	2	24	29	90	−61	10

=== Group VI ===
Pos	Team	Pld	W	D	L	GF	GA	GD	Pts
1	Badalona	30	21	5	4	85	46	+39	47
2	Manresa	30	18	7	5	85	30	+55	43
3	Mataró	30	17	5	8	64	48	+16	39
4	Girona	30	14	10	6	75	37	+38	38
5	Fabra y Coats	30	16	5	9	59	50	+9	37
6	Puig-Reig	30	15	4	11	64	48	+16	34
7	Figueres	30	13	7	10	66	50	+16	33
8	Artiguense	30	12	6	12	54	77	−23	30
9	Gramenet	30	14	2	14	62	60	+2	30
10	Manlleu	30	12	4	14	48	64	−16	28
11	Olot	30	10	7	13	59	48	+11	27
12	Sant Andreu	30	10	3	17	42	63	−21	23
13	Montcada	30	8	4	18	58	88	−30	20
14	Granollers	30	6	7	17	45	76	−31	19
15	Adrianense	30	6	4	20	37	77	−40	16
16	Vic	30	6	4	20	39	80	−41	16

=== Group VII ===
Pos	Team	Pld	W	D	L	GF	GA	GD	Pts
1	Gimnàstic de Tarragona	30	18	10	2	74	30	+44	46
2	L'Hospitalet	30	18	6	6	78	32	+46	42
3	Reus	30	15	8	7	57	38	+19	38
4	Martinenc	30	13	5	12	59	57	+2	31
5	Europa	30	12	6	12	59	46	+13	30
6	Lleida	30	13	4	13	61	56	+5	30
7	Rapitenca	30	12	5	13	50	71	−21	29
8	Júpiter	30	12	5	13	60	71	−11	29
9	Sants	30	11	7	12	62	54	+8	29
10	Vilanova	30	10	8	12	54	53	+1	28
11	Balaguer	30	11	5	14	56	69	−13	27
12	Gavà	30	11	5	14	51	55	−4	27
13	Iberia	30	9	9	12	41	50	−9	27
14	Amposta	30	9	6	15	42	63	−21	24
15	La Cava	30	9	6	15	38	69	−31	24
16	Santboià	30	7	5	18	47	75	−28	19

=== Group VIII ===
Pos	Team	Pld	W	D	L	GF	GA	GD	Pts
1	Atlético Baleares	28	23	2	3	82	23	+59	48
2	Constància	28	22	3	3	96	22	+74	47
3	Soledad	28	20	3	5	73	34	+39	43
4	Mahón	28	17	3	8	61	39	+22	37
5	Felanitx	28	15	6	7	56	36	+20	36
6	Menorca	28	13	3	12	61	52	+9	29
7	Manacor	28	10	8	10	52	45	+7	28
8	Poblense	28	10	5	13	50	67	−17	25
9	Atlètic de Ciutadella	28	9	4	15	66	76	−10	22
10	Andratx	28	9	4	15	49	68	−19	22
11	Alaró	28	9	3	16	64	68	−4	21
12	Pollença	28	9	2	17	36	69	−33	20
13	Alaior	28	6	3	19	35	72	−37	15
14	Cardessar	28	6	2	20	37	112	−75	14
15	Sóller	28	5	3	20	39	74	−35	13
16	Murense (Note: Team withdrawn from the competition)	0	0	0	0	0	0	0	0

=== Group IX ===
Pos	Team	Pld	W	D	L	GF	GA	GD	Pts
1	Olímpic de Xàtiva	30	23	1	6	86	29	+57	47
2	Ontinyent	30	19	5	6	64	38	+26	43
3	Alcoyano	30	17	5	8	65	44	+21	39
4	Cullera	30	17	4	9	69	49	+20	38
5	Gandía	30	16	4	10	82	43	+39	36
6	Sueca	30	17	2	11	66	51	+15	36
7	Alzira	30	13	8	9	59	49	+10	34
8	Canals	30	11	10	9	52	39	+13	32
9	Acero	30	12	3	15	43	51	−8	27
10	Pego	30	10	6	14	43	59	−16	26
11	Portuarios	30	9	6	15	47	61	−14	24
12	Atlético Saguntino	30	8	7	15	40	74	−34	23
13	Onda	30	7	8	15	32	46	−14	22
14	Villarreal	30	10	2	18	29	68	−39	22
15	Catarroja	30	8	5	17	45	60	−15	21
16	Alginet	30	3	4	23	21	82	−61	10

=== Group X ===
Pos	Team	Pld	W	D	L	GF	GA	GD	Pts
1	Albacete	30	24	2	4	101	27	+74	50
2	Cartagenera	30	22	5	3	99	29	+70	49
3	Imperial	30	21	4	5	79	37	+42	46
4	Eldense	30	17	5	8	85	49	+36	39
5	Alicante	30	16	3	11	59	35	+24	35
6	Orihuela	30	14	6	10	65	53	+12	34
7	Lorca	30	12	4	14	47	55	−8	28
8	Abarán	30	14	0	16	55	60	−5	28
9	Cieza	30	13	1	16	55	63	−8	27
10	Almoradí	30	10	5	15	46	71	−25	25
11	Rayo Ibense	30	10	4	16	52	80	−28	24
12	Novelda	30	10	4	16	48	75	−27	24
13	Madrigueras	30	10	3	17	38	65	−27	23
14	Crevillente Industrial	30	10	2	18	51	86	−35	22
15	Águilas	30	8	2	20	55	76	−21	18
16	Callosa	30	3	2	25	20	94	−74	6 (Note: 2 points deducted)

=== Group XI ===
Pos	Team	Pld	W	D	L	GF	GA	GD	Pts
1	Sevilla Atlético	30	23	5	2	79	18	+61	51
2	Melilla	30	20	4	6	62	19	+43	44
3	Linares	30	18	2	10	57	36	+21	38
4	Algeciras	30	15	4	11	51	38	+13	34
5	Balompédica Linense	30	13	6	11	67	52	+15	32
6	Peñarroya Pueblonuevo	30	15	1	14	56	55	+1	31
7	Atlético Malagueño	30	12	5	13	51	45	+6	29
8	Ronda	30	13	3	14	42	55	−13	29
9	Adra	30	12	4	14	51	55	−4	28
10	Veleño	30	11	5	14	32	56	−24	27
11	Recreativo de Granada	30	10	5	15	51	42	+9	25
12	Atlético Cordobés	30	10	4	16	52	63	−11	24
13	Antequerano	30	11	2	17	31	43	−12	24
14	Iliturgi	30	9	4	17	38	77	−39	22
15	Baeza	30	8	5	17	28	66	−38	21
16	Écija	30	9	3	18	39	67	−28	21

=== Group XII ===
Pos	Team	Pld	W	D	L	GF	GA	GD	Pts
1	Recreativo de Huelva	30	23	5	2	98	13	+85	51
2	Xerez	30	20	5	5	62	26	+36	45
3	Ayamonte	30	17	5	8	55	39	+16	39
4	La Palma	30	16	5	9	66	44	+22	37
5	Jerez Industrial	30	12	11	7	60	43	+17	35
6	Balón de Cádiz	30	13	6	11	54	33	+21	32
7	Portuense	30	13	6	11	59	49	+10	32
8	Kimber Utrera	30	11	8	11	62	55	+7	30
9	Bollullos	30	11	7	12	34	43	−9	29
10	Barbate	30	9	9	12	55	69	−14	27
11	Coria	30	10	3	17	56	72	−16	23
12	Victoria	30	7	9	14	40	69	−29	23
13	Puerto Real	30	9	5	16	42	82	−40	23
14	Riffien Jadú	30	9	3	18	37	55	−18	21
15	Olímpica Valverdeña	30	5	8	17	39	74	−35	18
16	Atlético Sanluqueño	30	4	7	19	34	87	−53	15

=== Group XIII ===
Pos	Team	Pld	W	D	L	GF	GA	GD	Pts
1	Cacereño	30	23	2	5	83	41	+42	48
2	Burgos	30	19	7	4	73	26	+47	45
3	Palencia	30	19	2	9	83	44	+39	40
4	Europa Delicias	30	18	3	9	55	36	+19	39
5	Hullera Vasco-Leonesa	30	18	3	9	53	44	+9	39
6	Juventud	30	17	3	10	60	37	+23	37
7	Plasencia	30	13	5	12	60	47	+13	31
8	Salmantino	30	14	3	13	55	58	−3	31
9	Júpiter Leonés	30	12	3	15	48	57	−9	27
10	Ponferradina	30	11	3	16	59	48	+11	25
11	Béjar Industrial	30	10	5	15	49	63	−14	25
12	Atlético Zamora	30	8	5	17	49	71	−22	21
13	Arandina	30	7	7	16	52	86	−34	21
14	Astorga	30	8	4	18	39	66	−27	20
15	Ciudad Rodrigo	30	6	6	18	34	80	−46	18
16	San Pedro	30	6	1	23	31	79	−48	13

=== Group XIV ===
Pos	Team	Pld	W	D	L	GF	GA	GD	Pts
1	Calvo Sotelo	32	22	5	5	84	24	+60	49
2	Villarrobledo	32	19	6	7	81	34	+47	44
3	Badajoz	32	18	7	7	72	37	+35	43
4	Getafe	32	17	5	10	58	46	+12	39
5	Toledo	32	15	6	11	59	53	+6	36
6	Madrileño	32	15	6	11	61	45	+16	36
7	Alcázar	32	12	11	9	61	54	+7	35
8	Manchego	32	15	3	14	57	51	+6	33
9	Real Aranjuez	32	11	9	12	47	44	+3	31
10	Alcalá	32	14	2	16	56	68	−12	30
11	Don Benito	32	12	6	14	50	63	−13	30
12	Villaverde Boetticher	32	10	9	13	45	55	−10	29
13	Guadalajara	32	12	5	15	42	47	−5	29
14	Manzanares	32	11	6	15	53	61	−8	28
15	Emeritense	32	11	4	17	45	56	−11	26
16	San Lorenzo	32	6	2	24	24	112	−88	14
17	Manufacturas Metálicas	32	4	4	24	35	80	−45	12

== Promotion playoff ==
=== Champions ===
==== First round ====
Team 1	Agg.	Team 2	1st leg	2nd leg
Gimnàstic de Tarragona	1–4	Sevilla Atlético	0–1	1–3
Rayo Cantabria	2–5	Alavés	2–0	0–5
Amistad	(t) 3–3	Cacereño	1–0	2–3
Olímpic de Xàtiva	1–3	Atlético Baleares	1–0	0–3
La Felguera	1–3	Albacete	1–2	0–1
Recreativo de Huelva	(t) 4–4	Calvo Sotelo	4–1	0–3

==== Final Round ====
Team 1	Agg.	Team 2	1st leg	2nd leg
Sevilla Atlético	2–3	Alavés	2–0	0–3
Amistad	2–8	Atlético Baleares	1–2	1–6
Albacete	2–1	Badalona	1–0	1–1
Racing de Ferrol	2–3	Recreativo de Huelva	1–2	1–1

=== Runners-up ===
==== First round ====
Team 1	Agg.	Team 2	1st leg	2nd leg
Melilla	4–6	Galdakao	2–4	2–2
Manresa	3–4	L'Hospitalet	2–2	1–2
Vitoria	2–6	Burgos	2–2	0–4
Ontinyent	4–1	Arenas	2–0	2–1
Constància	3–3 (t)	Xerez	2–0	1–3
Villarrobledo	4–3	Real Avilés	3–2	1–1

==== Second round ====
Team 1	Agg.	Team 2	1st leg	2nd leg
Galdakao	4–2	L'Hospitalet	4–1	0–1
Cartagenera	7–1	Lugo	6–0	1–1
Burgos	(t) 3–3	Ontinyent	3–1	0–2
Xerez	4–8	Villarrobledo	2–1	2–7

==== Final Round ====
Team 1	Agg.	Team 2	1st leg	2nd leg
Sporting de Gijón	3–5	Burgos	2–3	1–2
Cartagenera	4–1	Sestao	3–0	1–1
Castellón	1–3	Villarrobledo	1–0	0–3
Galdakao	3–6	Real Jaén	1–1	2–5

== Season records ==
- Most wins: 24, Racing de Ferrol, Real Avilés and Albacete.
- Most draws: 11, Jerez Industrial and Alcázar.
- Most losses: 25, Callosa.
- Most goals for: 103, Racing de Ferrol.
- Most goals against: 112, Cardessar and San Lorenzo.
- Most points: 51, Racing de Ferrol, Sevilla Atlético and Recreativo de Huelva.
- Fewest wins: 3, Flavia, Naval, Alginet and Callosa.
- Fewest draws: 0, Abarán.
- Fewest losses: 2, Gimnàstic de Tarragona, Sevilla Atlético and Recreativo de Huelva.
- Fewest goals for: 18, Naval.
- Fewest goals against: 13, Recreativo de Huelva.
- Fewest points: 6, Callosa.
