= CD Villarrobledo =

Spanish football club based in Albacete

Villarrobledo
- Full name: Club Deportivo Villarrobledo
- Nickname(s): Villa
- Founded: 1942; 1956 (refounded)
- Dissolved: 1968
- Ground: N. Señora de la Caridad, Villarrobledo, Castile-La Mancha, Spain
- Capacity: 6,000
Home colours	Away colours

Club Deportivo Villarrobledo was a Spanish football club based in Villarrobledo, Albacete, in the autonomous community of Castile-La Mancha.

== History ==
Originally founded in 1942, the club was dissolved in 1945, but refounded in 1956 under the name of Villarrobledo Frente de Juventudes. The club played two seasons before achieving promotion to Tercera División. It subsequently changed name to Club Deportivo Villarrobledo, and promoted to Segunda División in 1961.

After suffering immediate relegation, the club went on to play six more campaigns before folding. In 1971, CP Villarrobledo was founded and took CD Villarrobledo's colours and crest.

== Season to season ==
Season	Tier	Division	Place	Copa del Rey
1944–45	5	2ª Reg.	(R)	
1945–1956	DNP			
1956–57	4	1ª Reg.	1st	
1957–58	4	1ª Reg.	1st	
1958–59	3	3ª	2nd	
1959–60	3	3ª	3rd	
1960–61	3	3ª	2nd	

Season	Tier	Division	Place	Copa del Rey
1961–62	2	2ª	16th	First round
1962–63	3	3ª	7th	
1963–64	3	3ª	5th	
1964–65	3	3ª	3rd	
1965–66	3	3ª	6th	
1966–67	3	3ª	9th	
1967–68	3	3ª	17th	

- 1 season in Segunda División
- 9 seasons in Tercera División
