= 1985–86 Tercera División =

Tercera División
- Season: 1985–86

The 1985–86 Tercera División season is the 9th season since establishment the tier four.

== League tables ==
=== Group I ===
Pos	Team	Pld	W	D	L	GF	GA	GD	Pts
1	Lugo	38	24	10	4	57	18	+39	58
2	Endesa As Pontes	38	19	16	3	73	28	+45	54
3	Fabril Deportivo	38	16	14	8	57	33	+24	46
4	Gran Peña	38	17	12	9	65	37	+28	46
5	Viveiro	38	15	13	10	44	32	+12	43
6	Portonovo	38	15	11	12	42	42	0	41
7	Alondras	38	16	9	13	47	34	+13	41
8	Racing de Ferrol	38	14	13	11	40	32	+8	41
9	Coruxo	38	15	9	14	42	48	−6	39
10	Barco	38	11	17	10	32	31	+1	39
11	Boiro	38	11	16	11	38	38	0	38
12	Vista Alegre	38	11	15	12	46	53	−7	37
13	Céltiga	38	14	8	16	48	52	−4	36
14	Arenteiro	38	12	11	15	31	40	−9	35
15	Flavia	38	12	10	16	35	41	−6	34
16	Tyde	38	11	12	15	31	46	−15	34
17	Lemos	38	11	9	18	38	49	−11	31
18	Marín	38	8	13	17	29	44	−15	29
19	Turista	38	8	8	22	33	65	−32	24
20	San Martín	38	2	10	26	14	79	−65	14

=== Group II ===
Pos	Team	Pld	W	D	L	GF	GA	GD	Pts
1	Langreo	38	25	11	2	95	21	+74	61
2	Caudal	38	26	9	3	76	14	+62	61
3	Real Avilés	38	26	9	3	93	21	+72	61
4	Rayo Cantabria	38	23	10	5	73	34	+39	56
5	Laredo	38	19	11	8	63	42	+21	49
6	Mosconia	38	20	8	10	65	45	+20	48
7	Siero	38	19	9	10	66	35	+31	47
8	Gimnástica de Torrelavega	38	16	13	9	61	42	+19	45
9	Lenense	38	14	13	11	54	46	+8	41
10	Marino de Luanco	38	14	12	12	48	48	0	40
11	Real Oviedo Aficionado	38	12	11	15	50	51	−1	35
12	Turón	38	9	16	13	43	54	−11	34
13	San Martín	38	12	9	17	38	63	−25	33
14	Hispano	38	11	7	20	49	65	−16	29
15	Guarnizo	38	9	11	18	54	83	−29	29
16	Castro	38	10	5	23	33	67	−34	25
17	Santoña	38	6	7	25	21	67	−46	19
18	Naval	38	7	3	28	26	86	−60	17
19	Atlético Camocha	38	1	13	24	29	79	−50	15
20	Barquereño	38	5	5	28	17	91	−74	15

=== Group III ===
Pos	Team	Pld	W	D	L	GF	GA	GD	Pts
1	Eibar	38	25	8	5	85	23	+62	58
2	Barakaldo	38	24	10	4	63	22	+41	58
3	Santurtzi	38	19	13	6	51	28	+23	51
4	Baskonia	38	19	12	7	77	47	+30	50
5	Amorebieta	38	22	5	11	80	40	+40	49
6	Durango	38	18	8	12	60	41	+19	44
7	Erandio	38	16	9	13	58	49	+9	41
8	Portugalete	38	13	13	12	38	51	−13	39
9	Zalla	38	13	13	12	42	44	−2	39
10	Gernika	38	17	5	16	64	53	+11	39
11	Tolosa	38	12	12	14	41	44	−3	36
12	Real Unión	38	14	8	16	52	50	+2	36
13	Arenas de Getxo	38	11	13	14	37	51	−14	35
14	Santutxu	38	11	11	16	46	62	−16	33
15	Anaitasuna	38	12	9	17	36	49	−13	33
16	Mutriku	38	13	5	20	43	72	−29	31
17	Hernani	38	8	11	19	35	59	−24	27
18	Elgoibar	38	5	12	21	33	74	−41	22
19	Bergara	38	6	8	24	27	68	−41	20
20	Ortuella	38	5	9	24	25	66	−41	19

=== Group IV ===
Pos	Team	Pld	W	D	L	GF	GA	GD	Pts
1	Osasuna Promesas	38	18	14	6	61	32	+29	50
2	Huesca	38	19	11	8	70	44	+26	49
3	Teruel	38	18	12	8	62	42	+20	48
4	Arnedo	38	19	9	10	75	42	+33	47
5	Oberena	38	21	5	12	66	52	+14	47
6	Atlético Monzón	38	17	8	13	65	52	+13	42
7	Fraga	38	18	6	14	72	64	+8	42
8	Mirandés	38	16	9	13	52	53	−1	41
9	Sabiñánigo	38	16	7	15	68	63	+5	39
10	Izarra	38	14	10	14	52	48	+4	38
11	Numancia	38	15	8	15	53	48	+5	38
12	Ejea	38	14	8	16	57	58	−1	36
13	Peña Sport	38	12	12	14	44	56	−12	36
14	Corellano	38	13	7	18	56	66	−10	33
15	Alsasua	38	10	13	15	34	49	−15	33
16	Berceo	38	10	11	17	42	64	−22	31
17	Atlético Cirbonero	38	12	6	20	51	81	−30	30
18	Tudelano	38	10	8	20	39	60	−21	28
19	Calahorra	38	8	10	20	49	66	−17	26
20	Noain	38	11	4	23	40	68	−28	26

=== Group V ===
Pos	Team	Pld	W	D	L	GF	GA	GD	Pts
1	Mollerussa	38	21	8	9	65	40	+25	50
2	Girona	38	20	7	11	81	54	+27	47
3	Sant Andreu	38	19	8	11	66	43	+23	46
4	Manlleu	38	19	7	12	67	46	+21	45
5	Manresa	38	16	12	10	64	38	+26	44
6	Terrassa	38	18	8	12	81	60	+21	44
7	Granollers	38	18	7	13	64	51	+13	43
8	Banyoles	38	15	14	9	69	44	+25	42 (Note: 2 points deducted)
9	Prat	38	12	15	11	55	57	−2	39
10	Igualada	38	15	9	14	57	56	+1	39
11	Júpiter	38	14	11	13	45	46	−1	39
12	Blanes	38	13	12	13	43	45	−2	38
13	Lloret	38	14	10	14	55	51	+4	38
14	Martinenc	38	15	7	16	45	53	−8	37
15	Europa	38	14	9	15	46	60	−14	37
16	Masnou	38	12	8	18	54	79	−25	32
17	Horta	38	10	11	17	45	61	−16	31
18	Vilafranca	38	8	13	17	60	65	−5	29
19	Badalona	38	8	13	17	36	62	−26	29
20	Gavà	38	1	7	30	28	115	−87	9

=== Group VI ===
Pos	Team	Pld	W	D	L	GF	GA	GD	Pts
1	Alzira	38	23	11	4	64	28	+36	57
2	Gandía	38	24	8	6	62	23	+39	56
3	Nules	38	14	15	9	52	33	+19	43
4	Olímpic de Xàtiva	38	17	9	12	56	39	+17	43
5	Mestalla	38	14	14	10	63	38	+25	42
6	Villarreal	38	16	9	13	51	39	+12	41
7	Ontinyent	38	15	10	13	47	45	+2	40
8	Burriana	38	14	11	13	51	46	+5	39
9	Benidorm	38	10	17	11	48	48	0	37
10	Villajoyosa	38	12	13	13	49	50	−1	37
11	Castellón Aficionados	38	13	10	15	48	49	−1	36
12	Alicante	38	15	6	17	46	49	−3	36
13	Requena	38	13	9	16	41	55	−14	35
14	Novelda	38	13	8	17	39	46	−7	34
15	Catarroja	38	11	11	16	46	57	−11	33
16	Rayo Ibense	38	14	5	19	41	65	−24	33
17	Benicarló	38	10	11	17	43	58	−15	31
18	Vinaròs	38	10	11	17	33	59	−26	31
19	Villena	38	8	12	18	33	68	−35	28
20	Carcaixent	38	8	12	18	37	55	−18	28

=== Group VII ===
Pos	Team	Pld	W	D	L	GF	GA	GD	Pts
1	Leganés	38	23	7	8	74	42	+32	53
2	Valdepeñas	38	20	9	9	54	36	+18	49
3	Atlético Valdemoro	38	18	13	7	46	30	+16	49
4	Real Madrid Aficionados	38	16	12	10	74	53	+21	44
5	Gimnástica Segoviana	38	16	11	11	65	51	+14	43
6	Conquense	38	16	11	11	46	37	+9	43
7	Daimiel	38	14	15	9	58	47	+11	43
8	Real Ávila	38	15	12	11	51	47	+4	42
9	Pegaso	38	13	13	12	43	40	+3	39
10	Alcorcón	38	14	9	15	40	39	+1	37
11	Manchego	38	12	12	14	58	58	0	36
12	Guadalajara	38	13	9	16	41	48	−7	35
13	San Sebastián de los Reyes	38	11	12	15	39	39	0	34
14	Móstoles	38	11	12	15	42	53	−11	34
15	Real Aranjuez	38	11	11	16	40	50	−10	33
16	Azuqueca	38	10	13	15	33	52	−19	33
17	Tomelloso	38	10	11	17	45	58	−13	31
18	San Fernando de Henares	38	12	7	19	43	61	−18	31
19	Colonia Moscardó	38	11	7	20	31	55	−24	29
20	Fuensalida	38	4	14	20	32	59	−27	22

=== Group VIII ===
Pos	Team	Pld	W	D	L	GF	GA	GD	Pts
1	Cultural Leonesa	38	27	8	3	91	18	+73	62
2	Ponferradina	38	24	10	4	73	30	+43	58
3	Real Valladolid Promesas	38	20	14	4	63	19	+44	54
4	Salmantino	38	22	8	8	86	39	+47	52
5	Cultural de León	38	19	13	6	64	37	+27	51
6	Atlético Astorga	38	18	10	10	65	37	+28	46
7	Toreno	38	14	11	13	40	45	−5	39
8	Cristo Olímpico	38	13	13	12	54	42	+12	39
9	Briviesca	38	15	8	15	61	64	−3	38
10	Atlético Bembibre	38	14	8	16	60	49	+11	36
11	Racing Lermeño	38	15	5	18	57	64	−7	35
12	Gimnástica Medinense	38	15	4	19	51	66	−15	34
13	Dulciora Universidad	38	10	14	14	53	57	−4	34
14	Arandina	38	12	8	18	42	50	−8	32
15	Guardo	38	11	10	17	38	53	−15	32
16	Béjar Industrial	38	11	7	20	43	77	−34	29
17	Toresana	38	11	5	22	50	80	−30	27
18	Coyanza	38	8	9	21	42	71	−29	25
19	Venta de Baños	38	8	8	22	48	92	−44	24
20	Olmedo	38	2	9	27	26	117	−91	11 (Note: 2 points deducted)

=== Group IX ===
Pos	Team	Pld	W	D	L	GF	GA	GD	Pts
1	Polideportivo Almería	38	23	8	7	67	30	+37	54
2	Atlético Marbella	38	20	12	6	70	35	+35	52
3	Ronda	38	20	10	8	71	33	+38	50
4	Martos	38	21	7	10	94	42	+52	49
5	Atlético Malagueño	38	16	14	8	62	41	+21	46
6	Roquetas	38	18	8	12	55	40	+15	44
7	Baza	38	18	7	13	64	52	+12	43
8	UD Melilla	38	16	10	12	37	34	+3	42
9	Antequerano	38	17	7	14	50	40	+10	41
10	Juventud de Torremolinos	38	14	10	14	54	59	−5	38
11	Villanueva	38	16	6	16	52	64	−12	38
12	Atlético Coín	38	12	11	15	47	52	−5	35
13	Atlético La Zubia	38	14	7	17	38	60	−22	35
14	Mijas	38	13	7	18	54	63	−9	33
15	Estepona	38	9	15	14	33	51	−18	33
16	Atlético Macael	38	8	16	14	39	49	−10	32
17	Alhaurino	38	10	11	17	40	65	−25	31
18	Iliturgi	38	10	7	21	40	51	−11	27
19	Fuengirola	38	8	7	23	38	77	−39	23
20	Melilla FC	38	4	6	28	30	97	−67	14

=== Group X ===
Pos	Team	Pld	W	D	L	GF	GA	GD	Pts
1	Sevilla Atlético	40	31	8	1	112	22	+90	70
2	Coria	40	29	5	6	80	31	+49	63
3	Utrera	40	19	12	9	54	36	+18	50
4	Atlético Sanluqueño	40	18	12	10	50	38	+12	48
5	Pozoblanco	40	20	8	12	73	57	+16	48
6	Pilas	40	17	13	10	58	24	+34	47
7	Mairena	40	18	10	12	56	36	+20	46
8	San Fernando	40	17	11	12	47	45	+2	45
9	Cádiz B	40	17	10	13	68	40	+28	44
10	Atlético Palma del Río	40	15	8	17	54	40	+14	38
11	Portuense	40	14	9	17	49	57	−8	37
12	Bollullos	40	12	13	15	32	59	−27	37
13	Rota	40	13	9	18	55	59	−4	35
14	Moguer	40	12	10	18	39	66	−27	34
15	Brenes	40	12	10	18	39	52	−13	34
16	Egabrense	40	11	10	19	44	61	−17	32
17	Jerez Industrial	40	11	10	19	43	61	−18	32
18	Chiclana	40	10	8	22	40	60	−20	28
19	Imperio de Ceuta	40	8	11	21	42	68	−26	27
20	Puerto Real	40	8	7	25	37	66	−29	23
21	Rute	40	5	12	23	29	123	−94	22

=== Group XI ===
Pos	Team	Pld	W	D	L	GF	GA	GD	Pts
1	Mallorca Atlético	38	21	15	2	77	24	+53	57
2	Atlético Baleares	38	24	8	6	82	27	+55	56
3	Badía-Cala Millor	38	19	11	8	61	30	+31	49
4	Sporting Mahonés	38	19	10	9	61	34	+27	48
5	Constància	38	19	7	12	62	40	+22	45
6	Hospitalet Isla Blanca	38	18	9	11	48	48	0	45
7	Ibiza	38	14	13	11	45	38	+7	41
8	Peña Deportiva	38	15	10	13	47	43	+4	40
9	Santanyí	38	15	8	15	53	64	−11	38
10	Portmany	38	14	9	15	57	57	0	37
11	Ferreries	38	15	6	17	39	52	−13	36
12	Murense	38	11	13	14	56	63	−7	35
13	Sóller	38	9	17	12	39	47	−8	35
14	Montuïri	38	13	6	19	49	65	−16	32
15	Alaró	38	10	11	17	46	62	−16	31
16	Alaior	38	12	6	20	40	51	−11	30
17	Costa Calvià	38	10	10	18	50	65	−15	30
18	Atlètic de Ciutadella	38	10	10	18	39	50	−11	30
19	Felanitx	38	9	10	19	33	70	−37	28
20	Margaritense	38	5	7	26	18	72	−54	17

=== Group XII ===
Pos	Team	Pld	W	D	L	GF	GA	GD	Pts
1	Maspalomas	40	27	6	7	99	32	+67	60
2	Las Palmas Atlético	40	22	13	5	86	39	+47	57
3	Mensajero	40	21	11	8	67	32	+35	53
4	Tenisca	40	21	9	10	78	42	+36	51
5	San Andrés	40	21	8	11	75	57	+18	50
6	Lanzarote	40	19	8	13	63	52	+11	46
7	Güímar	40	15	15	10	54	48	+6	45
8	Telde	40	21	2	17	94	66	+28	44
9	Marino	40	18	8	14	71	62	+9	44
10	Puerto de la Cruz	40	14	10	16	52	66	−14	38
11	Icodense	40	14	10	16	50	54	−4	38
12	Orotava	40	14	9	17	58	65	−7	37
13	Salud	40	14	9	17	56	69	−13	37
14	Tacoronte	40	13	7	20	48	62	−14	33
15	Laguna	40	12	9	19	58	70	−12	33
16	Arucas	40	13	7	20	63	80	−17	33
17	Juventud Silense	40	11	11	18	35	63	−28	33
18	Tenerife Aficionado	40	12	7	21	58	76	−18	31
19	Realejos	40	9	12	19	43	77	−34	30
20	Santa Brígida	40	11	5	24	43	77	−34	27
21	Racing	40	6	8	26	58	120	−62	18 (Note: 2 points deducted)

=== Group XIII ===
Pos	Team	Pld	W	D	L	GF	GA	GD	Pts
1	Eldense	38	23	7	8	78	33	+45	53
2	Bigastro	38	21	10	7	63	34	+29	52
3	Torrevieja	38	22	7	9	76	42	+34	51
4	Ilicitano	38	16	13	9	58	40	+18	45
5	Villarrobledo	38	17	11	10	60	46	+14	45
6	Águilas	38	17	10	11	53	45	+8	44
7	Imperial	38	17	10	11	58	37	+21	44
8	Torreagüera	38	16	10	12	53	47	+6	42
9	Yeclano	38	16	10	12	83	60	+23	42
10	Cieza	38	12	16	10	49	37	+12	40
11	Torre Pacheco	38	15	9	14	55	48	+7	39
12	Atlético Albacete	38	15	9	14	58	58	0	39
13	Naval	38	14	9	15	48	52	−4	37
14	La Roda	38	11	12	15	51	64	−13	34
15	Dolores	38	12	9	17	50	54	−4	33
16	Horadada	38	11	9	18	51	70	−19	31
17	Callosa	38	8	11	19	44	76	−32	27
18	Olímpico de Totana	38	9	6	23	52	84	−32	24
19	Caravaca	38	8	8	22	39	78	−39	24
20	Alcantarilla	38	4	6	28	20	94	−74	14

=== Group XIV ===
Pos	Team	Pld	W	D	L	GF	GA	GD	Pts
1	Badajoz	38	32	4	2	110	10	+100	68
2	Don Benito	38	24	10	4	78	29	+49	58
3	Cacereño	38	26	6	6	86	27	+59	58
4	Extremadura	38	20	11	7	70	27	+43	51
5	Montijo	38	22	7	9	61	34	+27	51
6	Moralo	38	21	6	11	64	35	+29	48
7	Mérida	38	15	18	5	57	34	+23	48
8	La Estrella	38	18	7	13	60	56	+4	43
9	Díter Zafra	38	16	6	16	62	49	+13	38
10	Sanvicenteño	38	13	9	16	52	59	−7	35
11	Fuente de Cantos	38	12	10	16	36	53	−17	34
12	Aceuchal	38	14	4	20	47	74	−27	32
13	Villanovense	38	12	8	18	32	44	−12	32
14	Guareña	38	11	6	21	55	85	−30	28
15	Azuaga	38	11	6	21	43	73	−30	28
16	Puebla Patria	38	9	9	20	37	80	−43	27
17	Olivenza	38	7	11	20	26	59	−33	25
18	Villafranca	38	7	11	20	38	67	−29	25
19	Castuera	38	4	8	26	27	80	−53	16
20	Calamonte	38	6	3	29	37	103	−66	15

== Promotion playoff ==
=== First round ===
Team 1	Agg.	Team 2	1st leg	2nd leg
Huesca	0–2	Maspalomas	0–0	0–2
Caudal	3–4	Polideportivo Almería	1–0	2–4
Las Palmas Atlético	1–2	Badajoz	0–2	1–0
Eibar	3–2	Coria	1–1	2–1
Gandía	3–2	Langreo	3–1	0–1
Osasuna Promesas	1–2	Atlético Baleares	1–1	0–1
Barakaldo	3–4	Mallorca Atlético	3–1	0–3
Endesa As Pontes	(p) 1–1	Cultural Leonesa	1–1	0–0
Ponferradina	(p) 1–1	Eldense	1–0	0–1
Alzira	3–0	Bigastro	3–0	0–0
Mollerussa	(p) 2–2	Sevilla Atlético	2–2	0–0
Leganés	3–4	Lugo	1–1	2–3

=== Final Round ===
Team 1	Agg.	Team 2	1st leg	2nd leg
Lugo	2–0	Atlético Baleares	2–0	0–0
Ponferradina	2–2 (p)	Mallorca Atlético	1–1	1–1
Endesa As Pontes	1–2	Polideportivo Almería	1–0	0–2
Maspalomas	1–5	Gandía	1–0	0–5
Mollerussa	2–3	Alzira	1–0	1–3
Eibar	3–1	Badajoz	2–0	1–1

== Season records ==
- Most wins: 32, Badajoz.
- Most draws: 18, Mérida.
- Most losses: 30, Gavà.
- Most goals for: 112, Sevilla Atlético.
- Most goals against: 123, Rute.
- Most points: 70, Sevilla Atlético.
- Fewest wins: 1, Atlético Camocha and Gavà.
- Fewest draws: 2, Telde.
- Fewest losses: 1, Sevilla Atlético.
- Fewest goals for: 14, San Martín.
- Fewest goals against: 10, Badajoz.
- Fewest points: 9, Gavà.
