= CF Gimnástico Alcázar =

Spanish football team

Gimnástico Alcázar
- Full name: Club de Fútbol Gimnástico Alcázar
- Nickname(s): Nástico, Rojillos
- Founded: 1922; 1972 (refounded)
- Dissolved: 2015
- Ground: Estadio Municipal, Alcázar de San Juan, Castilla–La Mancha, Spain
- Capacity: 5,000
- President: Juan José Sánchez
- Head coach: Ángel García
- 2014–15: Tercera División – Group 18, 19th of 20
- Website: http://www.gimnastico.com/
| Home colours | Away colours |

Club de Fútbol Gimnástico Alcázar was a Spanish football team based in Alcázar de San Juan, Ciudad Real, in the autonomous community of Castilla–La Mancha. Founded in 1972 and dissolved in 2015, it last played in Tercera División – Group 18, holding home games at Estadio Municipal de Alcázar, with a capacity of 5,000 seats.

== History ==
Gimnástico Club de Fútbol was founded in 1922, but only played their first match outside the city in 1929. However, the club's foundation date is set in March 1930, with the club playing their first official season in 1930–31. The club played in two Tercera División seasons until their disbandment in 1949.

In the 1950s, as Gimnástico were without activities, Alcázar CF was founded in 1953 and played in the third division afterwards. Gimnástico returned to an active status in 1972, under the name of Club de Fútbol Gimnástico Alcázar.

== Season to season ==
=== Gimnástico CF ===
| Season | Tier | Division | Place | Copa del Rey |
|---|---|---|---|---|
| 1930–1943 | — | Regional | — | |
| 1943–44 | 4 | 1ª Reg. | 4th | |
| 1944–45 | 4 | 1ª Reg. | 1st | |
| 1945–46 | 4 | 1ª Reg. | 1st | |
| 1946–47 | 3 | 3ª | 8th | |
| 1947–48 | 3 | 3ª | 10th | First round |
| 1948–49 | 4 | 1ª Reg. | 5th | |

- 2 seasons in Tercera División

=== CF Gimnástico Alcázar ===
| Season | Tier | Division | Place | Copa del Rey |
|---|---|---|---|---|
| 1973–74 | 8 | 3ª Reg. | 1st | |
| 1974–75 | 7 | 3ª Reg. P. | 5th | |
| 1975–76 | 6 | 2ª Reg. | 11th | |
| 1976–77 | 6 | 2ª Reg. | 3rd | |
| 1977–78 | 6 | 1ª Reg. | 13th | |
| 1978–79 | 6 | 1ª Reg. | 8th | |
| 1979–80 | 6 | 1ª Reg. | 5th | |
| 1980–81 | 5 | Reg. Pref. | 10th | |
| 1981–82 | 5 | Reg. Pref. | 7th | |
| 1982–83 | 5 | Reg. Pref. | 4th | |
| 1983–84 | 5 | Reg. Pref. | 1st | |
| 1984–85 | 4 | 3ª | 19th | |
| 1985–86 | 5 | Reg. Pref. | 3rd | |
| 1986–87 | 5 | Reg. Pref. | 2nd | |
| 1987–88 | 4 | 3ª | 5th | |
| 1988–89 | 4 | 3ª | 3rd | |
| 1989–90 | 4 | 3ª | 2nd | |
| 1990–91 | 4 | 3ª | 5th | |
| 1991–92 | 4 | 3ª | 4th | Fourth round |
| 1992–93 | 4 | 3ª | 5th | Fourth round |
| 1993–94 | 4 | 3ª | 6th | First round |

| Season | Tier | Division | Place | Copa del Rey |
|---|---|---|---|---|
| 1994–95 | 4 | 3ª | 6th | |
| 1995–96 | 4 | 3ª | 13th | |
| 1996–97 | 4 | 3ª | 11th | |
| 1997–98 | 4 | 3ª | 13th | |
| 1998–99 | 4 | 3ª | 15th | |
| 1999–2000 | 4 | 3ª | 10th | |
| 2000–01 | 4 | 3ª | 10th | |
| 2001–02 | 4 | 3ª | 14th | |
| 2002–03 | 4 | 3ª | 15th | |
| 2003–04 | 4 | 3ª | 7th | |
| 2004–05 | 4 | 3ª | 3rd | |
| 2005–06 | 4 | 3ª | 4th | |
| 2006–07 | 4 | 3ª | 13th | |
| 2007–08 | 4 | 3ª | 10th | |
| 2008–09 | 4 | 3ª | 8th | |
| 2009–10 | 4 | 3ª | 18th | |
| 2010–11 | 5 | Aut. Pref. | 3rd | |
| 2011–12 | 4 | 3ª | 7th | |
| 2012–13 | 4 | 3ª | 7th | |
| 2013–14 | 4 | 3ª | 14th | |
| 2014–15 | 4 | 3ª | 19th | |

- 28 seasons in Tercera División

== Copa del Rey ==
| Season | Date | Round | Local | | | Visitor |
| 1990–91 | 1990 | 1ª | Gimnástico de Alcázar | 3 | 3 | Montilla |
| | 1990 | 1ª | Montilla | 3 | 1 | Gimnástico de Alcázar |
| 1991–92 | 1991 | 1ª | Villarrobledo | 1 | 2 | Gimnástico de Alcázar |
| | 1991 | 1ª | Gimnástico de Alcázar | 1 | 1 | Villarrobledo |
| | 1991 | 3ª | Gimnástico de Alcázar | 3 | 0 | Oliva |
| | 1991 | 3ª | Oliva | 1 | 0 | Gimnástico de Alcázar |
| | 1991 | 4ª | Gimnástico de Alcázar | 1 | 1 | Castellón |
| | 1991 | 4ª | Castellón | 2 | 0 | Gimnástico de Alcázar |
| 1992–93 | 1992 | 1ª | Gimnástico de Alcázar | 1 | 0 | Toledo |
| | 1992 | 1ª | Toledo | 1 | 3 | Gimnástico de Alcázar |
| | 1992 | 2ª | Gimnástico de Alcázar | 3 | 2 | Valdepeñas |
| | 1992 | 2ª | Valdepeñas | 1 | 0* | Gimnástico de Alcázar |
| | 1992 | 3ª | Gimnástico de Alcázar | 3 | 1 | Eibar |
| | 1992 | 3ª | Eibar | 3 | 2 | Gimnástico de Alcázar |
| | 1992 | 4ª | Gimnástico de Alcázar | 0 | 2 | Sevilla |
| | 1992 | 4ª | Sevilla | 5 | 0 | Gimnástico de Alcázar |
| 1993–94 | 1993 | 1ª | Gimnástico de Alcázar | 0 | 3 | Tomelloso |
| | 1993 | 1ª | Tomelloso | 3 | 0 | Gimnástico de Alcázar |

*winner on penalties.
