= SD Lenense =

Association football club in Spain

Coordinates: 43.149117°N 5.822800°W

Lenense
- Full name: Sociedad Deportiva Lenense
- Founded: 4 August 1953; 73 years ago
- Stadium: Estadio El Sotón
- Capacity: 3,000
- President: Manuel Ángel García Rodríguez
- Head coach: Borja Blanco Vega
- League: Primera Asturfútbol
- 2025–26: Tercera Federación – Group 2, 15th of 18 (relgated)
- Website: http://www.sdlenense.es
| Home colours | Away colours |

Sociedad Deportiva Lenense, also known as Lenense Proinastur by sponsorship reasons, is a football team based in Pola de Lena in the autonomous community of Asturias. Founded in 1953, the team plays in Primera Asturfútbol. The club played their home games at Estadio El Sotón, which has a capacity of 3,000 spectators.

== History ==
Sociedad Deportiva Lenense was founded on 4 August 1953 by a local group of friends who had the aim of managing a football club in Pola de Lena. The club quickly consolidated in the region and promoted to Tercera División for the first time in 1959, but it was relegated to the Regional leagues only two years later.

After this relegation, Lenense spent 22 years in the Regional divisions before promoting again to Tercera, in 1984, starting its golden years. In the 1987–88 season, Lenense finished in the sixth position, the best one in the club's history. It was finally relegated in 1990 and started alternating seasons between Tercera División and the Regional Preferente.

After a come back to Tercera in 2003, where the club only achieved 22 points, Lenense started its decline that ended with two consecutive relegations, that left the club in the last division of the Asturian football. It was twice eliminated in the promotion playoffs to Primera Regional, sixth tier, in 2008 and 2009, but a restructuring of this league allowed Lenense to be promoted.

In 2010, the arrival of Miguel Marcos as president of the club changed the club, that was immersed in a financial crisis since 2005. Lenense created again the youth teams and also a futsal one, after an agreement with local club CD Zurea. Despite not being a priority, the 2010–11 season finished with a promotion to Regional Preferente.

On 5 May 2013, Lenense ended its worst years by promoting again to Tercera División. Since this date, the club again alternates Tercera División and Regional Preferente.

== Season by season ==
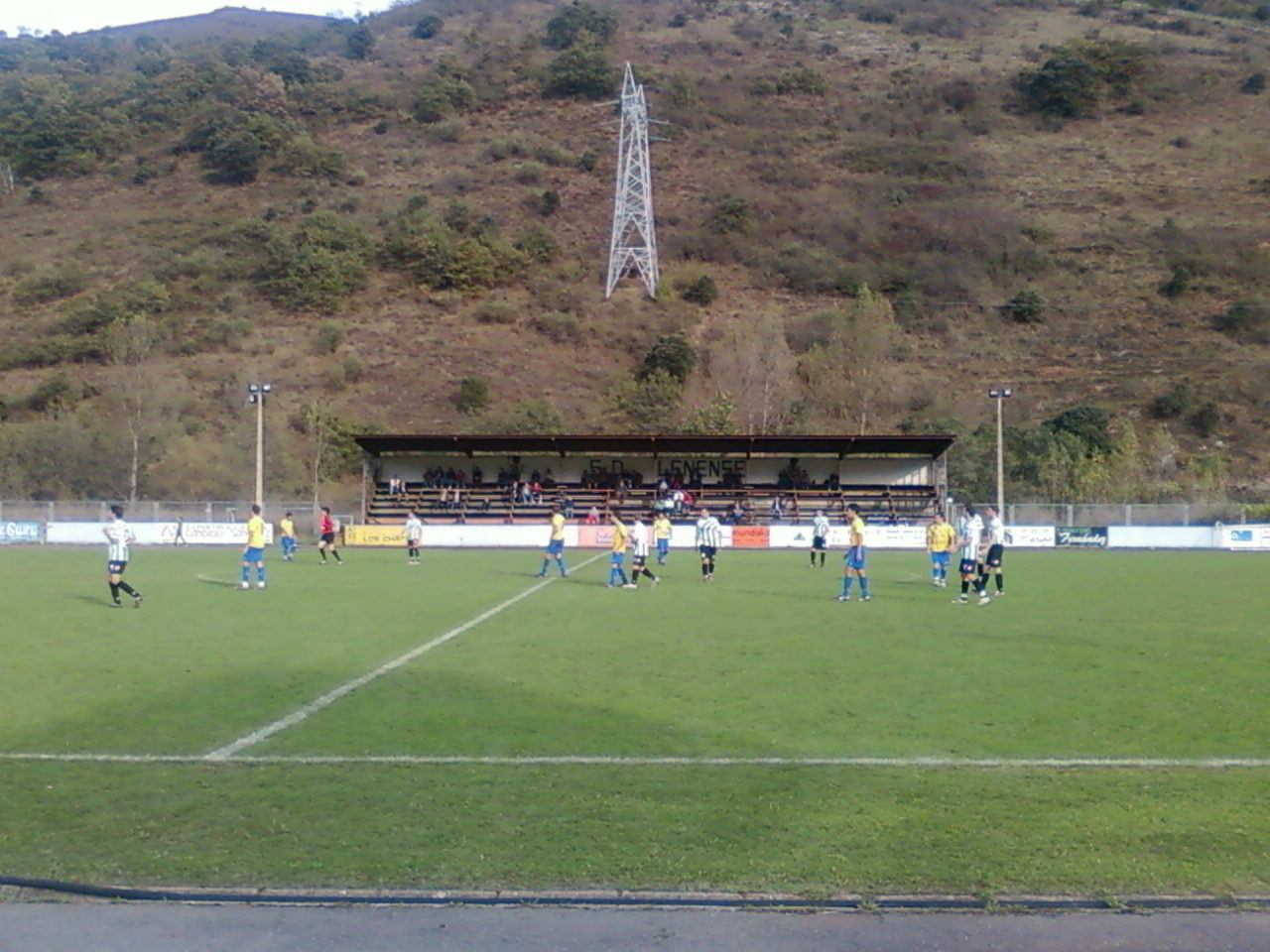
Estadio El Sotón

| Season | Level | Division | Place | Copa del Rey |
|---|---|---|---|---|
| 1953–54 | 5 | 2ª Reg. | 7th | |
| 1954–55 | 5 | 2ª Reg. | 2nd | |
| 1955–56 | 4 | 1ª Reg. | 8th | |
| 1956–57 | 4 | 1ª Reg. | 2nd | |
| 1957–58 | 4 | 1ª Reg. | 7th | |
| 1958–59 | 4 | 1ª Reg. | 11th | |
| 1959–60 | 4 | 1ª Reg. | 2nd | |
| 1960–61 | 3 | 3ª | 7th | |
| 1961–62 | 3 | 3ª | 15th | |
| 1962–63 | 4 | 1ª Reg. | 10th | |
| 1963–64 | 4 | 1ª Reg. | 13th | |
| 1964–65 | 5 | 2ª Reg. | | |
| 1965–66 | 5 | 2ª Reg. | 7th | |
| 1966–67 | 5 | 2ª Reg. | 1st | |
| 1967–68 | 4 | 1ª Reg. | 8th | |
| 1968–69 | 4 | 1ª Reg. | 17th | |
| 1969–70 | 4 | 1ª Reg. | 16th | |
| 1970–71 | 5 | 2ª Reg. | 11th | |
| 1971–72 | 5 | 2ª Reg. | 9th | |
| 1972–73 | 5 | 2ª Reg. | 4th | |

| Season | Level | Division | Place | Copa del Rey |
|---|---|---|---|---|
| 1973–74 | 6 | 2ª Reg. | 2nd | |
| 1974–75 | 5 | 2ª Reg. P. | 4th | |
| 1975–76 | 5 | 2ª Reg. P. | 8th | |
| 1976–77 | 5 | 2ª Reg. P. | 12th | |
| 1977–78 | 6 | 2ª Reg. P. | 6th | |
| 1978–79 | 6 | 1ª Reg. | 4th | |
| 1979–80 | 5 | Reg. Pref. | 14th | |
| 1980–81 | 5 | Reg. Pref. | 11th | |
| 1981–82 | 5 | Reg. Pref. | 2nd | |
| 1982–83 | 5 | Reg. Pref. | 6th | |
| 1983–84 | 5 | Reg. Pref. | 2nd | |
| 1984–85 | 4 | 3ª | 10th | |
| 1985–86 | 4 | 3ª | 9th | |
| 1986–87 | 4 | 3ª | 8th | |
| 1987–88 | 4 | 3ª | 6th | |
| 1988–89 | 4 | 3ª | 15th | |
| 1989–90 | 4 | 3ª | 18th | |
| 1990–91 | 5 | Reg. Pref. | 10th | |
| 1991–92 | 5 | Reg. Pref. | 3rd | |
| 1992–93 | 4 | 3ª | 14th | |

| Season | Level | Division | Place | Copa del Rey |
|---|---|---|---|---|
| 1993–94 | 4 | 3ª | 11th | |
| 1994–95 | 4 | 3ª | 19th | |
| 1995–96 | 5 | Reg. Pref. | 12th | |
| 1996–97 | 5 | Reg. Pref. | 5th | |
| 1997–98 | 5 | Reg. Pref. | 7th | |
| 1998–99 | 5 | Reg. Pref. | 8th | |
| 1999–2000 | 5 | Reg. Pref. | 20th | |
| 2000–01 | 6 | 1ª Reg. | 3rd | |
| 2001–02 | 5 | Reg. Pref. | 14th | |
| 2002–03 | 5 | Reg. Pref. | 3rd | |
| 2003–04 | 4 | 3ª | 20th | |
| 2004–05 | 5 | Reg. Pref. | 8th | |
| 2005–06 | 5 | Reg. Pref. | 18th | |
| 2006–07 | 6 | 1ª Reg. | 16th | |
| 2007–08 | 7 | 2ª Reg. | 3rd | |
| 2008–09 | 7 | 2ª Reg. | 3rd | |
| 2009–10 | 6 | 1ª Reg. | 9th | |
| 2010–11 | 6 | 1ª Reg. | 5th | |
| 2011–12 | 5 | Reg. Pref. | 7th | |
| 2012–13 | 5 | Reg. Pref. | 2nd | |

| Season | Level | Division | Place | Copa del Rey |
|---|---|---|---|---|
| 2013–14 | 4 | 3ª | 15th | |
| 2014–15 | 4 | 3ª | 18th | |
| 2015–16 | 5 | Reg. Pref. | 3rd | |
| 2016–17 | 4 | 3ª | 19th | |
| 2017–18 | 5 | Reg. Pref. | 6th | |
| 2018–19 | 5 | Reg. Pref. | 4th | |
| 2019–20 | 4 | 3ª | 14th | |
| 2020–21 | 4 | 3ª | 6th / 4th | |
| 2021–22 | 5 | 3ª RFEF | 16th | |
| 2022–23 | 6 | 1ª RFFPA | 3rd | |
| 2023–24 | 5 | 3ª Fed. | 11th | |
| 2024–25 | 5 | 3ª Fed. | 15th | |
| 2025–26 | 5 | 3ª Fed. | | |

- 17 seasons in Tercera División
- 4 seasons in Tercera Federación/Tercera División RFEF
