= 1961–62 Tercera División =

Tercera División
- Season: 1961–62

The 1961–62 Tercera División season was the 26th since its establishment.

== League tables ==
=== Group I ===
Pos	Team	Pld	W	D	L	GF	GA	GD	Pts
1	Lugo	30	23	2	5	88	24	+64	48
2	Racing de Ferrol	30	19	4	7	74	27	+47	42
3	Arosa	30	16	5	9	65	49	+16	37
4	Lemos	30	16	4	10	48	43	+5	36
5	Couto	30	16	1	13	63	47	+16	33
6	Arsenal	30	14	5	11	49	38	+11	33
7	Turista	30	13	5	12	56	55	+1	31
8	Fabril	30	13	3	14	54	44	+10	29
9	Viveiro	30	11	6	13	39	46	−7	28
10	Alondras	30	10	7	13	40	57	−17	27
11	Coruxo	30	9	9	12	46	46	0	27
12	Zeltia	30	11	5	14	50	52	−2	27
13	Gran Peña	30	10	6	14	44	53	−9	26
14	Marín	30	10	5	15	41	67	−26	25
15	Choco	30	10	4	16	54	65	−11	24
16	Santiago	30	1	5	24	30	128	−98	2 (Note: 5 points deducted)

=== Group II ===
Pos	Team	Pld	W	D	L	GF	GA	GD	Pts
1	Langreo	30	25	1	4	108	28	+80	51
2	Real Avilés	30	18	7	5	82	35	+47	43
3	Caudal	30	16	10	4	58	28	+30	42
4	Turón	30	12	9	9	52	46	+6	33
5	Pelayo	30	13	6	11	50	55	−5	32
6	Llaranes	30	12	8	10	53	56	−3	32
7	El Entrego	30	15	2	13	65	64	+1	32
8	Calzada	30	12	8	10	57	48	+9	32
9	Siero	30	11	9	10	41	36	+5	31
10	Santiago de Aller	30	13	4	13	48	36	+12	30
11	Candás	30	14	2	14	40	59	−19	30
12	Luarca	30	12	5	13	61	47	+14	29
13	San Martín	30	10	6	14	42	55	−13	26
14	Recreativo Arnao	30	8	4	18	38	62	−24	20
15	Lenense	30	3	5	22	21	81	−60	7 (Note: 4 points deducted)
16	Real Titánico	30	1	4	25	19	99	−80	6

=== Group III ===
Pos	Team	Pld	W	D	L	GF	GA	GD	Pts
1	Gimnástica de Torrelavega	30	18	7	5	62	26	+36	43
2	Galdakao	30	18	7	5	62	27	+35	43
3	Arenas de Getxo	30	19	2	9	52	26	+26	40
4	Rayo Cantabria	30	17	4	9	75	47	+28	38
5	Sestao	30	13	11	6	54	32	+22	37
6	Getxo	30	11	11	8	63	50	+13	33
7	Larramendi	30	11	8	11	44	51	−7	30
8	Erandio	30	12	3	15	58	58	0	27
9	Barakaldo	30	11	4	15	53	45	+8	26
10	Laredo	30	9	8	13	35	52	−17	26
11	Santoña	30	9	8	13	33	55	−22	26
12	Santurtzi	30	8	9	13	33	54	−21	25
13	Guarnizo	30	8	8	14	38	71	−33	24
14	Deusto	30	8	6	16	25	49	−24	22
15	Durango	30	7	7	16	37	54	−17	21
16	SD Izarra	30	5	9	16	37	64	−27	19

=== Group IV ===
Pos	Team	Pld	W	D	L	GF	GA	GD	Pts
1	Eibar	32	22	5	5	80	26	+54	49
2	Logroñés	32	22	2	8	73	38	+35	46
3	Bergara	32	16	6	10	73	58	+15	38
4	Real Unión	32	16	5	11	70	41	+29	37
5	Beasain	32	16	5	11	57	57	0	37
6	Mirandés	32	15	6	11	65	56	+9	36
7	Alfaro	32	13	9	10	53	44	+9	35
8	Iruña	32	13	7	12	60	61	−1	33
9	Villafranca	32	14	3	15	58	76	−18	31
10	Euskalduna	32	14	2	16	65	52	+13	30
11	Tolosa	32	11	7	14	48	58	−10	29
12	Touring	32	11	6	15	61	56	+5	28
13	Azkoyen	32	12	3	17	44	61	−17	27
14	Vitoria	32	9	7	16	40	66	−26	25
15	Calahorra	32	7	8	17	38	71	−33	22
16	Recreación de Logroño	32	9	3	20	38	69	−31	21
17	Elgoibar	32	8	4	20	40	73	−33	20

=== Group V ===
Pos	Team	Pld	W	D	L	GF	GA	GD	Pts
1	Numancia	30	21	8	1	72	20	+52	50
2	Juventud	30	20	5	5	95	37	+58	45
3	Amistad	30	20	4	6	67	31	+36	44
4	Calvo Sotelo Andorra	30	16	5	9	69	50	+19	37
5	Alcañiz	30	13	7	10	43	37	+6	33
6	Barbastro	30	12	7	11	56	43	+13	31
7	Tarazona	30	12	7	11	65	50	+15	31
8	Ejea	30	12	5	13	61	58	+3	29
9	Atlético de Monzón	30	13	2	15	58	65	−7	28
10	Arenas	30	11	4	15	42	46	−4	26
11	Huesca	30	9	7	14	40	61	−21	25
12	Teruel	30	10	5	15	45	62	−17	25
13	Caspe	30	9	7	14	34	48	−14	25
14	Mequinenza	30	9	4	17	41	71	−30	22
15	Sabiñánigo	30	5	9	16	44	74	−30	19
16	Delicias	30	0	5	25	20	111	−91	5

=== Group VI ===
Pos	Team	Pld	W	D	L	GF	GA	GD	Pts
1	Terrassa	32	17	9	6	57	34	+23	43
2	Girona	32	17	8	7	92	52	+40	42
3	Figueres	32	17	7	8	59	48	+11	41
4	Fabra y Coats	32	16	8	8	68	46	+22	40
5	Mataró	32	15	9	8	73	52	+21	39
6	Badalona	32	18	2	12	78	50	+28	38
7	Manresa	32	16	5	11	64	48	+16	37
8	Puig-Reig	32	14	5	13	55	70	−15	33
9	Granollers	32	15	2	15	62	68	−6	32
10	Sant Andreu	32	11	9	12	39	50	−11	31
11	Guíxols	32	11	8	13	62	54	+8	30
12	Gramenet	32	10	7	15	60	70	−10	27
13	Manlleu	32	9	7	16	50	79	−29	25
14	Artiguense	32	8	9	15	45	65	−20	25
15	Olot	32	8	6	18	52	73	−21	22
16	Sant Celoni	32	8	4	20	40	66	−26	20
17	Montcada	32	7	5	20	47	78	−31	19

=== Group VII ===
Pos	Team	Pld	W	D	L	GF	GA	GD	Pts
1	Europa	30	21	4	5	76	29	+47	46
2	Condal	30	17	7	6	86	54	+32	41
3	Gimnàstic de Tarragona	30	17	7	6	74	39	+35	41
4	Reus	30	16	6	8	78	46	+32	38
5	L'Hospitalet	30	13	9	8	55	42	+13	35
6	Lleida	30	14	7	9	53	39	+14	35
7	Iberia	30	11	10	9	44	47	−3	32
8	Igualada	30	12	5	13	46	62	−16	29
9	Vilanova	30	12	4	14	59	65	−6	28
10	Sants	30	10	7	13	55	56	−1	27
11	Tortosa	30	11	4	15	49	55	−6	26
12	Balaguer	30	11	4	15	41	57	−16	26
13	Martinenc	30	8	6	16	49	74	−25	22
14	Júpiter	30	7	8	15	42	65	−23	22
15	Rapitenca	30	8	4	18	45	81	−36	20
16	Gavà	30	4	4	22	44	85	−41	9 (Note: 3 points deducted)

=== Group VIII ===
==== Mallorca ====
Pos	Team	Pld	W	D	L	GF	GA	GD	Pts
1	Constància	20	16	0	4	61	12	+49	32
2	Ibiza	20	14	3	3	52	17	+35	31
3	Manacor	20	13	3	4	48	22	+26	29
4	Soledad	20	10	1	9	40	24	+16	21
5	Juventud Sallista	20	8	4	8	37	36	+1	20
6	Escolar	20	8	2	10	29	47	−18	18
7	Alaró	20	7	2	11	25	38	−13	16
8	Felanitx	20	7	2	11	28	40	−12	16
9	Poblense	20	5	3	12	21	50	−29	13
10	Andratx	20	5	2	13	21	48	−27	12
11	Pollença	20	4	4	12	24	52	−28	12

==== Menorca ====
Pos	Team	Pld	W	D	L	GF	GA	GD	Pts
1	Menorca	12	8	2	2	36	15	+21	18
2	Atlètic de Ciutadella	12	7	1	4	21	21	0	15
3	Mahón	12	6	2	4	29	20	+9	14
4	Alaior	12	0	1	11	9	39	−30	1

=== Group IX ===
Pos	Team	Pld	W	D	L	GF	GA	GD	Pts
1	Gandía	30	20	6	4	75	42	+33	46
2	Alcoyano	30	16	6	8	59	41	+18	38
3	Castellón	30	15	7	8	68	35	+33	37
4	Tavernes	30	14	4	12	58	63	−5	32
5	Olímpic de Xàtiva	30	13	5	12	60	56	+4	31
6	Oliva	30	12	7	11	49	50	−1	31
7	Ontinyent	30	12	6	12	57	45	+12	30
8	Acero	30	12	5	13	58	65	−7	29
9	Sueca	30	12	5	13	58	58	0	29
10	Atlético Saguntino	30	12	5	13	54	54	0	29
11	Onda	30	12	6	12	47	49	−2	27 (Note: 3 points deducted)
12	Cullera	30	11	4	15	49	61	−12	26
13	Canals	30	8	9	13	52	66	−14	25
14	Alzira	30	9	7	14	39	54	−15	25
15	Pego	30	8	8	14	40	54	−14	24
16	Portuarios	30	6	6	18	46	76	−30	18

=== Group X ===
Pos	Team	Pld	W	D	L	GF	GA	GD	Pts
1	Eldense	30	22	4	4	81	24	+57	48
2	Imperial	30	19	6	5	77	38	+39	44
3	Lorca	30	17	7	6	77	29	+48	41
4	Abarán	30	14	9	7	67	36	+31	37
5	Orihuela	30	16	3	11	50	37	+13	35
6	Alicante	30	15	4	11	59	47	+12	34
7	Crevillente Industrial	30	13	7	10	56	65	−9	33
8	Almansa	30	13	3	14	71	64	+7	29
9	Cieza	30	12	3	15	52	59	−7	27
10	Águilas	30	12	3	15	57	79	−22	27
11	Almoradí	30	11	3	16	47	61	−14	25
12	Rayo Ibense	30	9	6	15	52	69	−17	24
13	Madrigueras	30	10	3	17	41	60	−19	23
14	Monóvar	30	8	5	17	38	78	−40	21
15	Novelda	30	6	5	19	33	69	−36	17
16	Callosa	30	4	7	19	37	80	−43	15

=== Group XI ===
Pos	Team	Pld	W	D	L	GF	GA	GD	Pts
1	Algeciras	30	22	5	3	69	20	+49	49
2	Melilla	30	19	7	4	61	15	+46	45
3	Balompédica Linense	30	16	7	7	58	40	+18	39
4	Atlético Malagueño	30	16	6	8	60	34	+26	38
5	Hispania	30	16	6	8	60	42	+18	38
6	Linares	30	14	5	11	48	44	+4	33
7	Antequerano	30	14	5	11	50	45	+5	33
8	Veleño	30	13	3	14	45	45	0	29
9	Adra	30	11	5	14	35	44	−9	27
10	Iliturgi	30	12	2	16	47	54	−7	26
11	Ronda	30	9	5	16	38	54	−16	23
12	Peñarroya Pueblonuevo	30	11	1	18	52	80	−28	23
13	Atlético Prieguense	30	10	2	18	39	55	−16	22
14	Alhaurino	30	9	3	18	39	75	−36	21
15	Recreativo de Granada	30	7	5	18	43	61	−18	19
16	Atlético Cordobés	30	5	5	20	43	79	−36	15

=== Group XII ===
Pos	Team	Pld	W	D	L	GF	GA	GD	Pts
1	Sevilla Atlético	30	23	4	3	102	21	+81	50
2	Xerez	30	22	4	4	69	17	+52	48
3	Jerez Industrial	30	23	2	5	74	32	+42	48
4	Kimber Utrera	30	17	5	8	60	40	+20	39
5	Balón de Cádiz	30	11	8	11	51	43	+8	30
6	Riotinto	30	11	8	11	46	47	−1	30
7	Puerto Real	30	12	4	14	39	49	−10	28
8	Olímpica Valverdeña	30	12	4	14	45	53	−8	28
9	Portuense	30	13	2	15	42	48	−6	28
10	La Palma	30	12	4	14	37	47	−10	28
11	Ayamonte	30	11	4	15	47	50	−3	26
12	Riffien Jadú	30	8	8	14	36	54	−18	24
13	Coria	30	9	5	16	46	59	−13	23
14	Barbate	30	9	4	17	27	69	−42	22
15	Bollullos	30	6	3	21	29	75	−46	15
16	Victoria	30	6	1	23	38	84	−46	13

=== Group XIII ===
Pos	Team	Pld	W	D	L	GF	GA	GD	Pts
1	Béjar Industrial	30	20	3	7	72	31	+41	43
2	Europa Delicias	30	18	7	5	62	34	+28	43
3	Cacereño	30	18	6	6	66	36	+30	42
4	Palencia	30	18	4	8	81	30	+51	40
5	Ponferradina	30	17	3	10	66	36	+30	37
6	Hullera Vasco-Leonesa	30	16	3	11	65	51	+14	35
7	Salmantino	30	11	7	12	50	52	−2	29
8	Plasencia	30	12	2	16	48	55	−7	26
9	Astorga	30	11	3	16	37	52	−15	25
10	Juventud	30	10	5	15	45	57	−12	25
11	Arandina	30	10	5	15	33	64	−31	25
12	Ciudad Rodrigo	30	9	6	15	51	72	−21	24
13	San Pedro	30	10	4	16	45	68	−23	24
14	Peñaranda	30	10	3	17	43	67	−24	23
15	Atlético Zamora	30	7	7	16	37	63	−26	21
16	Júpiter Leonés	30	6	6	18	25	58	−33	18

=== Group XIV ===
Pos	Team	Pld	W	D	L	GF	GA	GD	Pts
1	Calvo Sotelo	30	23	4	3	85	27	+58	50
2	Manchego	30	21	6	3	71	21	+50	48
3	Rayo Vallecano	30	20	5	5	53	20	+33	45
4	Extremadura	30	15	6	9	56	41	+15	36
5	Getafe	30	13	4	13	50	55	−5	30
6	Carabanchel	30	10	10	10	43	43	0	30
7	Real Aranjuez	30	13	3	14	42	43	−1	29
8	Tomelloso	30	12	4	14	44	56	−12	28
9	Alcázar	30	12	4	14	33	43	−10	28
10	Alcalá	30	11	5	14	40	53	−13	27
11	Madrileño	30	10	6	14	46	49	−3	26
12	Badajoz	30	10	6	14	49	49	0	26
13	Don Benito	30	10	6	14	39	57	−18	26
14	Guadalajara	30	7	8	15	30	57	−27	22
15	Toledo	30	6	6	18	33	54	−21	18
16	Villaverde Boetticher	30	3	5	22	22	68	−46	11

== Promotion playoff ==
=== Champions ===
==== First round ====
Team 1	Agg.	Team 2	1st leg	2nd leg
Europa	2–2 (t)	Langreo	2–1	0–1
Calvo Sotelo	2–3	Béjar Industrial	1–2	1–1
Gandía	1–3	Algeciras	0–2	1–1
Eibar	3–7	Eldense	3–0	0–7
Numancia	2–3	Gimnástica de Torrelavega	1–1	1–2
Sevilla Atlético	4–2	Terrassa	2–0	2–2

==== Final Round ====
Team 1	Agg.	Team 2	1st leg	2nd leg
Langreo	6–3	Béjar Industrial	5–0	1–3
Algeciras	3–4	Constància	3–2	0–2
Eldense	4–3	Gimnástica de Torrelavega	2–1	2–2
Lugo	1–5	Sevilla Atlético	1–1	0–4

=== Runners-up ===
==== First round ====
Team 1	Agg.	Team 2	1st leg	2nd leg
Condal	(t) 1–1	Logroñés	1–0	0–1
Juventud	3–5	Alcoyano	2–1	1–4
Manchego	7–2	Menorca	5–0	2–2
Europa Delicias	2–3	Galdakao	2–0	0–3
Imperial	(t) 2–2	Girona	2–1	0–1
Racing de Ferrol	3–4	Xerez	2–1	1–3

==== Second round ====
Team 1	Agg.	Team 2	1st leg	2nd leg
Manchego	2–4	Alcoyano	2–1	0–3
Melilla	4–2	Imperial	2–0	2–2
Condal	7–2	Galdakao	5–0	2–2
Xerez	3–6	Real Avilés	2–1	1–5

==== Final Round ====
Team 1	Agg.	Team 2	1st leg	2nd leg
Condal	1–4	Indautxu	0–3	1–1
Alcoyano	1–2	Baskonia	0–0	1–2
Real Avilés	4–8	San Fernando	2–3	2–5
Melilla	(t) 0–0	Albacete	0–0	0–0

== Season records ==
- Most wins: 25, Langreo.
- Most draws: 11, Sestao and Getxo.
- Most losses: 25, Titánico and Delicias.
- Most goals for: 108, Langreo.
- Most goals against: 128, Santiago.
- Most points: 51, Langreo.
- Fewest wins: 0, Delicias and Alaior.
- Fewest draws: 0, Constància.
- Fewest losses: 1, Numancia.
- Fewest goals for: 9, Alaior.
- Fewest goals against: 12, Constància.
- Fewest points: 1, Alaior.
