= 1959–60 Tercera División =

Tercera División
- Season: 1959–60

The 1959–60 Tercera División season was the 24th since its establishment.

== League table ==
=== Group 1 ===
Pos	Team	Pld	W	D	L	GF	GA	GD	Pts	Qualification or relegation
1	Pontevedra	30	21	4	5	89	28	+61	46	Promotion play-offs (champions)
2	Arsenal Ferrol	30	18	4	8	60	35	+25	40	Promotion/relegation play-offs
3	Turista	30	15	9	6	56	34	+22	39	
4	Zeltia	30	17	5	8	73	48	+25	39	
5	Lugo	30	15	7	8	53	27	+26	37	
6	Arosa	30	13	9	8	49	37	+12	33	
7	Vivero	30	12	7	11	42	53	−11	31	
8	Flavia	30	13	4	13	55	59	−4	30	
9	Gran Peña	30	13	4	13	49	51	−2	30	
10	Corujo	30	11	6	13	42	54	−12	28	
11	Fabril	30	7	10	13	34	53	−19	24	
12	Órdenes	30	8	7	15	40	59	−19	23	
13	Santiago	30	7	9	14	38	53	−15	23	
14	Lemos	30	8	6	16	42	62	−20	22	
15	Juvenil	30	8	3	19	34	76	−42	19	Relegation to Regional
16	Cambados	30	4	6	20	31	58	−27	14	Relegation to Regional

=== Group 4 ===
Source:

== Promotion play-off ==
Source:

== See also ==
- 1955–56 Tercera División
- 1956–57 Tercera División
- 1957–58 Tercera División
- 1958–59 Tercera División
