= 1957–58 Tercera División =

Tercera División
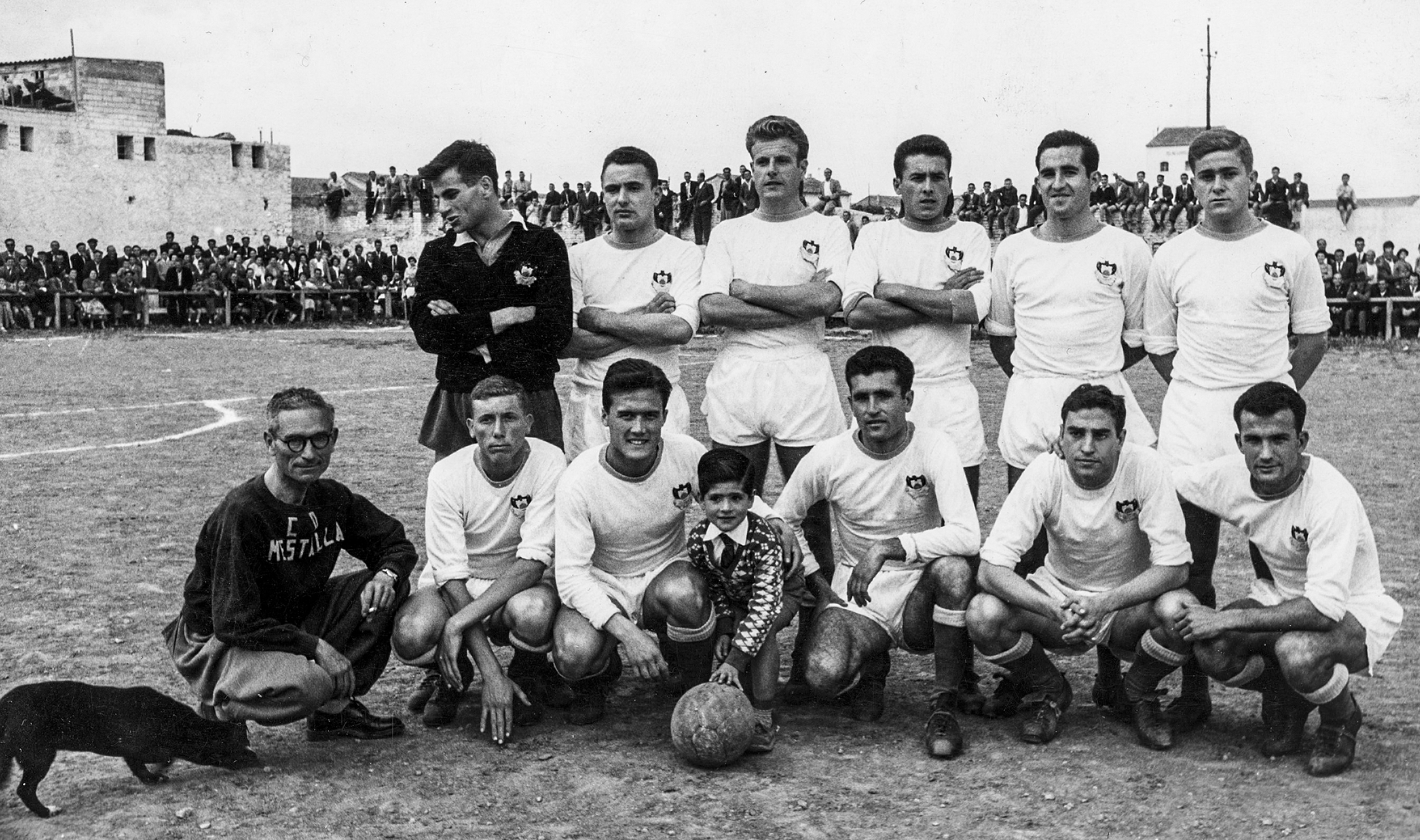
- CD Mestalla team, leader of the IX Group.
- Season: 1957–58

The 1957–58 Tercera División season was the 22nd since its establishment.

== League table ==
=== Group 1 ===
Pos	Team	Pld	W	D	L	GF	GA	GD	Pts	Qualification or relegation
1	Turista	30	24	4	2	89	19	+70	52	Promotion play-offs (champions)
2	Orense	30	20	6	4	87	30	+57	46	Promotion/relegation play-offs
3	Gran Peña	30	19	5	6	88	42	+46	43	
4	Lugo	30	16	7	7	71	35	+36	39	
5	Santiago	30	14	4	12	48	57	−9	32	
6	Juvenil	30	14	4	12	58	47	+11	32	
7	Fabril	30	11	8	11	47	55	−8	30	
8	Arsenal Ferrol	30	13	3	14	50	34	+16	27	
9	Cambados	30	10	7	13	44	65	−21	27	
10	Órdenes	30	11	5	14	45	63	−18	27	
11	Puenteareas	30	10	6	14	49	62	−13	26	
12	Arosa	30	9	7	14	50	59	−9	25	
13	Zeltia	30	11	3	16	38	72	−34	25	
14	Flavia	30	10	3	17	46	64	−18	23	
15	Lemos	30	5	4	21	37	84	−47	14	Relegation to Regional
16	Arenal	30	4	2	24	40	99	−59	10	Relegation to Regional

=== Group 3 ===
Source:

=== Group 4 ===
Source:

== Promotion play-offs ==
Source:
