= Basque football derbies =

Football rivalries in the Basque Country, Spain

Basque derbies
- Location: (Basque Country (autonomous community)) Basque Country
- Teams: Deportivo Alavés; Athletic Bilbao; SD Eibar; Real Sociedad (Navarre) CA Osasuna (professional level)

Statistics
- Total meetings: 576 (domestic league only)
- Most wins: Athletic Bilbao (129)
- Location of the professional teams' stadia in the Basque Autonomous Community

The term Basque derbies refers to the various local derbies between the football teams based in the Basque Country. Sometimes it can also refer to teams only part of the Basque Autonomous Community in Spain, which excludes teams from the French Basque Country and Navarre, most notably Osasuna. It specifically refers to individual matches between the teams, but can also be used to describe the general ongoing rivalry between the clubs and fans.

== Background ==
Map of the Basque Country within Europe

As of the 2025–26 season, there are four clubs in La Liga that play in the Basque Country area. The major rivalry is between Athletic Bilbao and Real Sociedad, representing their home provinces of Biscay and Gipuzkoa, known as 'the' Basque derby, which has been played over 140 times in the league alone. They also met in the 2020 Copa del Rey Final, won by Real Sociedad after being postponed for a year.

The third club, Deportivo Alavés, has not won any major honours, coming closest by finishing runners-up in the 2000–01 UEFA Cup and the 2016–17 Copa del Rey. The Babazorros, based in the regional capital Vitoria-Gasteiz, have spent 16 seasons in the top division across their history (they formed in 1921). Alavés were the highest-ranked Basque team for the first time in 1999–2000 when they finished 6th, and repeated the feat two years later with 7th place.

A dramatic match between Alavés and Real Sociedad took place in June 2008 at Mendizorrotza, with both clubs involved in battles at either end of the second division table going into the penultimate round. Real looked to have done enough to secure a win until the final minutes when two late goals turned the result (3–2) and gave Alavés all three points, which proved crucial as they escaped relegation by one point; Real Sociedad finished fourth and missed out on promotion. Nine years earlier, with both teams in the top tier, Alavés had again stayed clear of the drop zone with a 2–1 win at home to Real Sociedad on the last day.

The fourth club is Club Atlético Osasuna based in the province of Navarre. The Rojillos have spent 44 seasons in the top flight, with their best La Liga finishes being fourth place in 1990–91 and 2005–06, and have twice finished runners-up in the Copa del Rey, in 2004–05 and 2022–23. Their long-standing rivalry with Athletic Club dates back to 1923, when the two first met at San Mamés; they have since faced each other 199 times in official matches and friendlies.

A fifth club, SD Eibar, was also a fixture in the top division for much of the 2010s. A smaller organisation historically than Álaves reflected in fanbase and stadium, their home town of Eibar has a population of under 30,000 and is located midway between Bilbao and San Sebastián with many of the residents supporting either Athletic or Real Sociedad. The club's first ever campaign in the Primera was in 2014–15 (they clinched their promotion the previous year with a 1–0 win over Alavés which also seemed destined to relegate their opponent, though ultimately Alavés won their final two games and stayed up by one point). Despite finishing the first campaign in a relegation place after a dramatic final day, they were reprieved due to another club's administrative demotion. Their stadium is of a modest stature (Ipurua holds just over 7,000 even after improvements since the Armeros remained in the top division). Despite these limitations, Eibar's 9th place in the 2017–18 La Liga campaign made them the highest-ranking Basque club for the first time ever. Their top-division run eventually halted at the end of their seventh season in 2020–21.

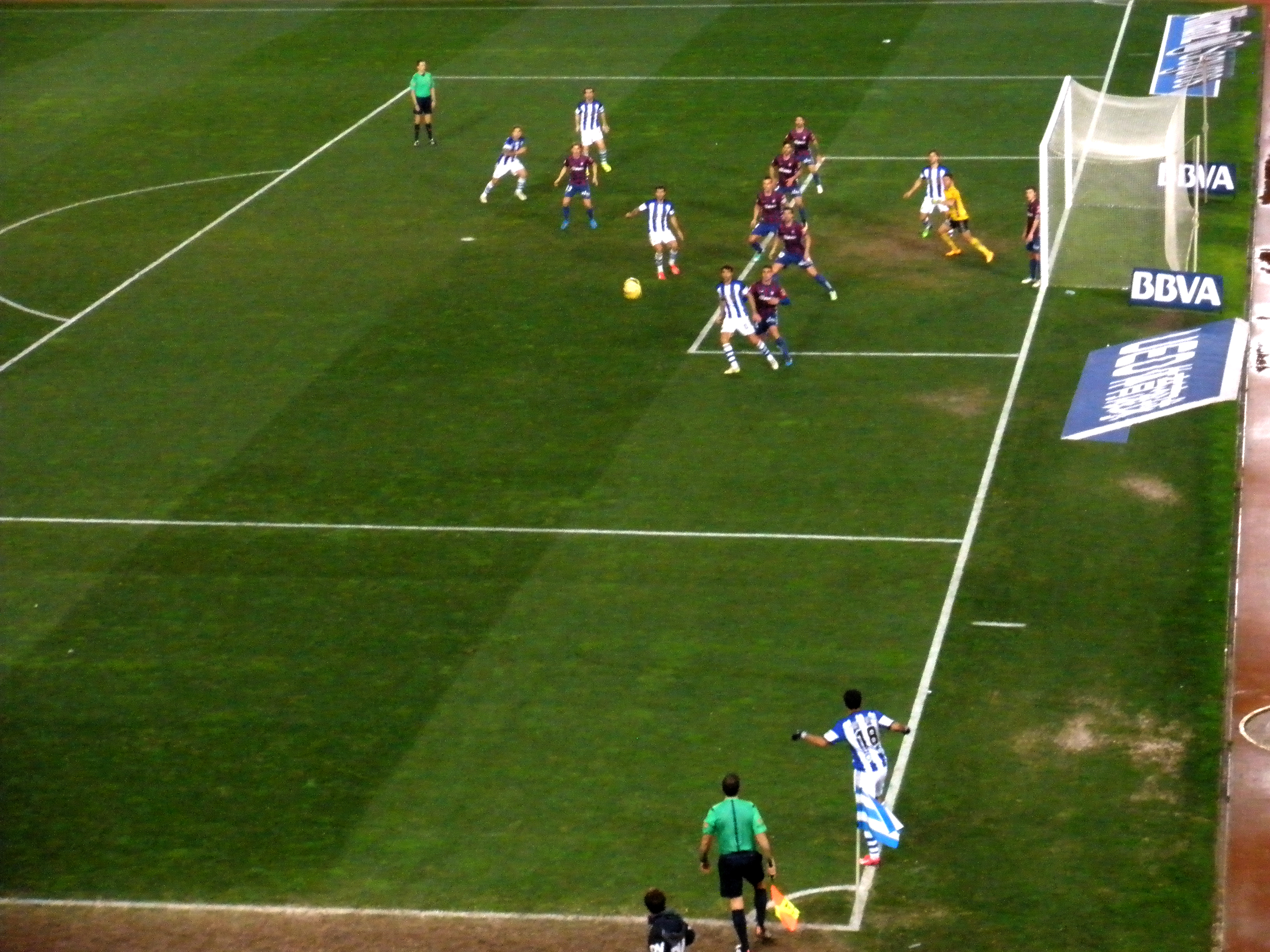
A derby match in La Liga between Real Sociedad and Eibar at Anoeta Stadium, 2015

Having never previously met in a competitive match during their 70-year coexistence, Eibar (then in the third tier, although they would gain promotion via the play-offs at the end of the season) achieved a shock victory in November 2012 when they eliminated Athletic Bilbao, the previous season's finalists, from the 2012–13 Copa del Rey on away goals; the Eibar scorer was Mikel Arruabarrena, an unsuccessful Athletic youth graduate. The second leg at the original San Mamés was also the last cup tie (of 268 in total) played at the stadium.

The relationship between Alavés and Eibar became more strained in 2017 when CD Vitoria, Eibar's recently incorporated farm team (based in Alavés' home town, previously an affiliate of that club and now competing directly with their reserve team) gained promotion and upgraded to municipally owned facilities in the city. A short time beforehand, Alavés had acquired the services of Eibar's youth academy director. With Alavés having also been relegated a year after Eibar in 2022, the two clubs both finished in the 2023 Segunda División play-offs positions and faced off in the semi-finals: Alavés prevailed over two legs, and then defeated Levante (the only goal scored in the last minute of extra time by Asier Villalibre, a loan player from Athletic) to secure promotion.

=== Other minor rivalries ===
While they were minnows in La Liga, Eibar have been very much at the head of the food chain of small-town Basque football since the 1980s and have habitually competed at a higher level than their geographical neighbours from the territory's numerous inland mountain valley communities (Elgoibar, Lagun Onak, Amorebieta, Beasain, Durango, Tolosa, Mondragón, Bergara, Gernika, Anaitasuna and Aretxabaleta). Until their rapid rise to the top tier, Eibar's closest battle at a provincial level was with Real Unión from Irun – albeit the two towns are on opposite sides of Gipuzkoa – with both operating well below local heavyweights Real Sociedad in the regional pecking order and on friendly terms with them due to the clear disparity in their statures. Amorebieta gained promotion to the second tier in 2020–21 – their organisational stature is reflected in the fact that their Urritxe ground had such basic facilities that home fixtures had to be played at Lezama, Athletic's training centre and B-team ground. After being relegated immediately, they went up again in 2022–23 (coincidentally clinching the promotion against Athletic B at Lezama) but then suffered consecutive relegations to the fourth level in 2024 and 2025.

=== Outside rivalries ===
Something of a rivalry developed between Alavés and CD Mirandés during the 2010s due to the teams sharing divisions for much of the decade. However, while this is certainly a matter of local interest (the towns are about 30 km apart), it is not a Basque derby as Miranda de Ebro is just over the Álava border into the Province of Burgos (Castile–León region), therefore regional pride is at stake when the sides meet.

The regional dimension is also present when Athletic Bilbao meet the biggest club in the Cantabria region, Racing de Santander, but that historic and unpredictable rivalry, which has been referred to in the past as 'the duel of the North' is dormant as Racing have not played in the top tier since 2012; a cup tie in 2016 resulted in a straightforward Athletic win but fans of both teams were reminded of a previous meeting in 2008 when the opposite outcome occurred.

=== Historic clubs ===
As well as the reserve teams of Athletic Bilbao and Real Sociedad (and sometimes Alavés), several smaller Basque teams play in the semi-professional fourth tier, third until 2021, which is organised on a regional basis; therefore local derbies occur between them regularly. The squads of these clubs are composed mainly of former Athletic and Real youth and reserve trainees who failed to make the grade at the top level.

Two of the teams, Real Unión and Arenas Club from Getxo, were among the strongest in Spain during the early decades of football in the country. Each won several editions of their respective regional tournaments in the 1910s and 1920s – Arenas battling with Athletic in the Biscay Championship and Real Unión with Real Sociedad in the Gipuzkoa Championship – and also appeared in a number of Copa del Rey finals: Arenas played in four, winning one (1919), while Real Unión were victorious in four of their five finals. Their last win in 1927 was against Arenas, with the match in Zaragoza being one of the first to be broadcast over radio; this is the only all-Basque Copa final which did not involve Athletic Bilbao.

Due to this strong performance, both were invited to participate in the inaugural season of La Liga in 1929, Real Unión surviving for the first four years of the competition and Arenas for seven. Due to the small scale of the clubs and the communities they represented, they were soon overshadowed by big-city teams as the game became professionalised and spread in popularity around the country. Neither Arenas nor Real Unión would appear again in the top division or make it back to the cup final beyond the 1930s, although they have survived into the 21st century competing at lower levels. Real Unión had a brief experience in the 2009–10 Segunda División, and when a new third level of 40 teams – Primera División RFEF – was created in 2021, they were one of the few from the territory to be included, along with Athletic Bilbao B. On the other hand, participation at a higher level increased: three Basque teams would be involved in 2021–22 Segunda División (from there being none the previous season) as Eibar's relegation coincided with the promotion of Amorebieta (for the first time ever) and Real Sociedad B, after an absence of 59 years.

The Basque team which spent the most time in the second division without ever being promoted – 28 seasons – is Barakaldo, and from the 1990s to the 2020s they were also almost perpetually in the third tier. They are one of a number of teams from the settlements lining either bank of the Estuary of Bilbao north of the city proper, along with Arenas and others including Erandio (who also faded from a greater prominence in the game's early decades), Portugalete, Sestao, Santurtzi and Leioa.

== Players and managers ==
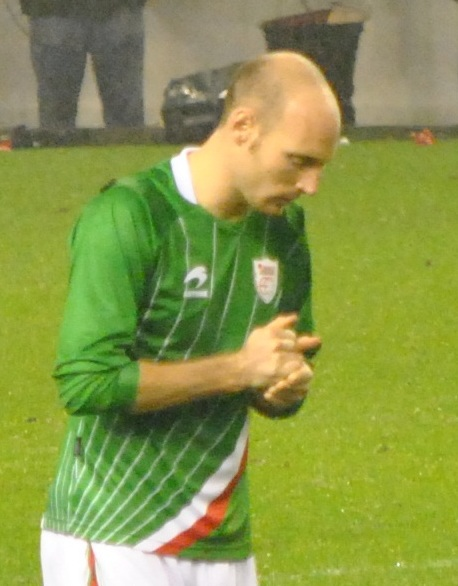
Gaizka Toquero played for several clubs in the region as well as the Basque representative team, seen here

The canteras (youth academies) of Athletic Bilbao and Real Sociedad have been analysed as being among the most productive in Europe, with the vast majority of the players originating from the Basque region (population approximately three million). By contrast, Alavés and Eibar have used few locals in their periods of relative success due to there being an insufficient number Basque players of the required quality – almost all who show potential at a young age are recruited by the larger duo; over the decades there is a regular pattern of Alavés losing emerging talent to Athletic, including Zubizarreta, Estíbariz, Karanka, de Marcos and Vesga.

in the modern era, no player has appeared for the first team of all four clubs in the league, although several have featured for three, including José Félix Guerrero, Xabier Castillo, Gaizka Toquero, Gaizka Garitano, Yuri Berchiche, Borja Viguera, Jon Moya, Joseba Arriaga, Luis Prieto, Edu Alonso, Luciano Iturrino, Ricardo Arrien, Xabier Guruzeta, Elías Querejeta, César and Josu Sarriegi. Toquero and Garitano were also youth players at the fourth club, and the latter was the manager who led Eibar from the third tier to the first in consecutive seasons between 2012 and 2014. In 2019, Garitano (now head coach of Athletic) faced up to Eibar with three former Armeros players, all signed the previous summer, in his team: Berchiche, Dani García and Ander Capa.

No coaches have taken charge of all four clubs, but Rafael Iriondo, José María Amorrortu and Baltasar Albéniz managed three (Albéniz also coached Osasuna).

== Osasuna and Navarre ==
Location of Navarre, with the Basque Autonomous Community to the west and Aragón to the east

CA Osasuna based in Pamplona, is often considered to be a Basque team and a participant in the region's derby matches as their homeland of Navarre is an integral part of the Greater Basque Country and many cultural ties exist; their ultras group Indar Gorri is favourable towards Basque nationalism. Nevertheless, at times their relationship with the neighbouring teams, particularly Athletic Bilbao, has been hostile. The two clubs have a mutual foe in Real Madrid, and Osasuna have their own inter-regional and ideological rivalry with Real Zaragoza, the only major club in neighbouring Aragón.

One reason for the animosity among the supporters of Athletic and Osasuna is the long list of players who have featured for both clubs, with many involved in direct transfers (Ziganda, Larrainzar, Lacruz, Tiko, Orbaiz, David López, Muñoz, Javi Martínez) born in or near Pamplona but signed by Athletic as they fit their selective player recruitment criteria. In the 21st century, Athletic have also trained several Pamplona natives (Iraizoz, Gurpegui, Llorente, San José, Muniain, Iñaki Williams, Nico Williams) from a young age in their youth setup when in the past they would have been likely to join Osasuna's cantera, at least during their formative years.

In the summer of 2017, Athletic's approach to sign 18-year-old Jesús Areso from Osasuna's youth team (making it impossible to reject by paying his contractual release clause amount) led to the Pamplona club temporarily breaking relations with their Bilbao neighbours in annoyance due to the impolite manner in which their board felt the business was conducted. That closely resembled a previous situation in 2005 when Osasuna objected to Athletic recruiting Isma López and Javier Eraso from their cantera. In 2020, Osasuna received two payments relating to Athletic players: approximately €150,000 in development fees came from sporting milestones achieved by Oihan Sancet who had moved to Bilbao in 2015 as a juvenile under freedom of contract, and €1.5 million from Torino who sold Álex Berenguer to Athletic whilst having a clause in his contract triggering an additional payment – specifically designed to hinder such a move and agreed at the height of the Areso dispute. In a rare move in the opposite direction, Areso was welcomed back to Osasuna in the summer of 2021, still looked upon as a good prospect but never used by Athletic's first team and frozen out in the reserve squad after he and the club failed to agree contractual terms.

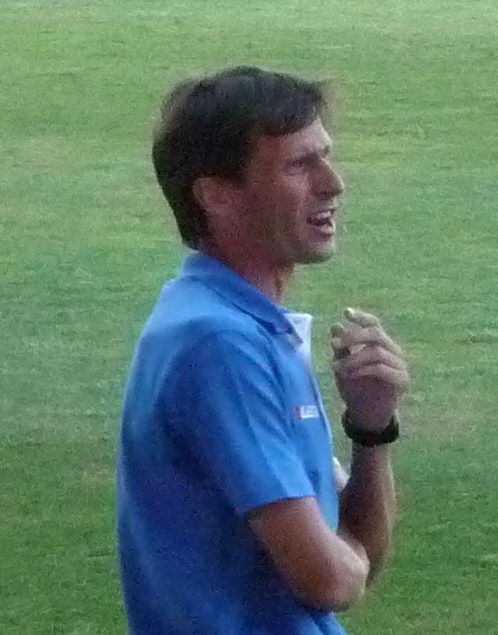
José Ángel Ziganda played for and managed both Osasuna and Athletic Bilbao

Like Alavés and Eibar, Osasuna have never won a major trophy. They have spent 35 seasons in the top tier, far more than the other smaller clubs, and have been ranked as the highest-placed Basque club in La Liga on four occasions (1957–58, 1990–91, 2005–06, 2011–12), but also had several spells playing at lower levels. The population of their home city is similar to that of Alavés, as is the capacity of their stadium (El Sadar). They were Copa finalists in 2005, losing to Real Betis who had defeated Athletic Bilbao on penalties in the semi-final to end the possibility of a rare all-Basque final. In the 2022–23 Copa del Rey, the two clubs met in the semi-final: Osasuna progressed thanks to a late goal from youth product Pablo Ibáñez in extra time of the second leg at San Mamés after both legs had finished 1–0 to the home side after 90 minutes. Los rojillos were defeated by Real Madrid in the final.

The most famous player to have featured for Osasuna, Athletic and Real Sociedad is Jon Andoni Goikoetxea, and Vicente Biurrun also did so. Asier Riesgo played for Real, Eibar and Osasuna, Kike García for Eibar, Osasuna and Alavés, and Tiko, Aitor Ocio, Pizo Gómez, Mikel Kortina and Asier García for Osasuna, Eibar and Athletic.

At the semi-professional Primera Federación and Segunda Federación levels (two and five groups respectively), clubs from Navarre (including Osasuna's reserves) are sometimes placed in the same section as teams from the Basque Autonomous Community, depending on the preferred method of distributing the teams evenly each year geographically. Below that, each autonomous community is allocated a section in the amateur fifth tier, the Tercera División, with the regional federations operating their own leagues further down the pyramid. At youth level, Basque and Navarrese clubs are grouped together in the top under-19 league, the División de Honor, but separately in the second-tier Liga Nacional and in younger age groups.

== Friendly trophy ==
In 2016, the Euskal Herria Kirola (Basque Country Sport) organisation announced they would create a friendly trophy for the teams in the territory, based on a similar existing idea for the equivalent women's teams. The results of the Basque derby league matches (20 relevant fixtures during 2016–17, including Osasuna in the consideration) would be collated, with the top two clubs playing off in a match at the start of the following season to determine the winner of the trophy and thus the 'best' Basque club for that year.

In the first edition of the Euskal Herriko Futbol Txapelketa (Basque Country Football Championship), the participants were Athletic Bilbao and Alavés; in a somewhat embarrassing outcome, the match in Barakaldo was abandoned by the referee in the closing minutes due to disorder among the players with the score at 2–2, and no winner was declared. The second edition in 2018 was contested between Real Sociedad and Athletic Bilbao, with the latter winning 1–0 to provide the competition with its first outright champion. Eibar won the third edition final in 2019, with Real Sociedad again runners-up having achieved the best results between the clubs in the preceding season. La Real were again the best performing team in the COVID-19-interrupted 2020 season in which all five teams were in the top division and survived, this time facing Osasuna in the final (played at their stadium, but behind closed doors due to the ongoing pandemic) and claiming the trophy at the third attempt.

== All-time meetings table (Spanish league) ==
The seven major clubs in the Basque region have met each other in the domestic league a varied number of times in various divisions. As Osasuna is not always considered to be a Basque club, their results have been recorded separately with a grand total for all seven clubs. Updated to end of 2021–22 season (Note: Applies to either team playing at home, includes all La Liga, Segunda División and Tercera División seasons from 1929, and Segunda División B from 1976)

Teams involved	GP	ALA	ARE	ATH	EIB	OSA	RSO	RUN	DRAW
Alavés vs. Arenas	30	12	9	N/A	N/A	N/A	N/A	N/A	9
Alavés vs. Athletic Bilbao	34	6	N/A	21	N/A	N/A	N/A	N/A	7
Alavés vs. Eibar	61	20	N/A	N/A	23	N/A	N/A	N/A	18
Alavés vs. Real Sociedad	46	12	N/A	N/A	N/A	N/A	25	N/A	9
Alavés vs. Real Unión	56	28	N/A	N/A	N/A	N/A	N/A	14	14
Arenas vs. Athletic Bilbao	14	N/A	6	7	N/A	N/A	N/A	N/A	1
Arenas vs. Eibar	16	N/A	1	N/A	10	N/A	N/A	N/A	5
Arenas vs. Real Sociedad	20	N/A	6	N/A	N/A	N/A	12	N/A	2
Arenas vs. Real Unión	70	N/A	23	N/A	N/A	N/A	N/A	23	24
Athletic Bilbao vs. Eibar	14	N/A	N/A	7	1	N/A	N/A	N/A	6
Athletic Bilbao vs. Real Sociedad	150	N/A	N/A	60	N/A	N/A	51	N/A	39
Athletic Bilbao vs. Real Unión	8	N/A	N/A	5	N/A	N/A	N/A	2	1
Eibar vs. Real Sociedad	18 (Note: the source incorrectly counts two matches between Eibar and Real Sociedad B in 1986–87)	N/A	N/A	N/A	4	N/A	7	N/A	7
Eibar vs. Real Unión	54	N/A	N/A	N/A	27	N/A	N/A	12	15
Real Sociedad vs. Real Unión	18	N/A	N/A	N/A	N/A	N/A	10	5	3
Total (BAC)	609	78	45	100	65	N/A	105	56	160
Osasuna vs. Alavés	58	16	N/A	N/A	N/A	31	N/A	N/A	11
Osasuna vs. Arenas	14	N/A	8	N/A	N/A	3	N/A	N/A	3
Osasuna vs. Athletic Bilbao	84	N/A	N/A	41	N/A	20	N/A	N/A	23
Osasuna vs. Eibar	30	N/A	N/A	N/A	6	12	N/A	N/A	12
Osasuna vs. Real Sociedad	84	N/A	N/A	N/A	N/A	23	44	N/A	17
Osasuna vs. Real Unión	28	N/A	N/A	N/A	N/A	16	N/A	8	4
Osasuna total	297	16	9	41	6	105	44	8	70
Grand total (GBC)	907	94	54	141	71	105	149	64	230

== Teams in the Basque Country ==
- Highest level reached by Basque teams

Division	Team(s)	Navarre	French Basque Country
Level 1	Alavés; Arenas; Athletic Bilbao; Eibar; Real Sociedad; Real Unión	Osasuna	---
Level 2	Amorebieta; Barakaldo; Bilbao Athletic; Erandio; Gernika; Indautxu; Sestao SC; Real Sociedad B	---	---
Level 3	Abanto; Alavés B; Amurrio; Anaitasuna; Apurtuarte; Aurrerá Ondarroa; Aurrerá Vitoria; Balmaseda; Basconia; Beasain; Begoña; Bergara; Bermeo; Deusto; Durango; Eibar B; Elgoibar; Euskalduna Galdakao; Garellano; Getxo; Hernani; Lagun Onak; Juventud Mondragón; Laudio; Larramendi; Leioa; Lemona; Llodio; Mutriku Padura; Pasaia; Peña; Portugalete; San Vicente; Santurtzi; Sestao RC; Tolosa; Touring; Vasconia; Villafranca; Vitoria; Zalla; Zamudio	Alesves; Atlético Aurora; Azkoyen; Castejón; Iruña; Izarra; Mutilvera; CD Oberena; Osasuna B; Peña Sport; Rochapeano; Tudelano; Txantrea	Aviron Bayonnais

- Accurate for season 2023–24

Division	Team(s)	Navarre
La Liga	Alavés; Athletic Bilbao; Real Sociedad	Osasuna
Segunda División	Amorebieta; Eibar	---
Primera División RFEF	Real Sociedad B; Real Unión; Sestao River	Osasuna B
Segunda División RFEF	Alavés B; Arenas Club; Barakaldo; Bilbao Athletic; Gernika; Real Sociedad C	Egüés; Izarra; Mutilvera; San Juan; Tudelano
