= 1983–84 Tercera División =

Season of the fourth tier of the Spanish football league

Tercera División
- Season: 1983–84

The 1983–84 Tercera División season is the 7th season since establishment the tier four. Was organised in fourteen regional groups. The best performing teams in each group went into a two-round promotion playoff, from which six teams were promoted to the Segunda División B.

== League tables ==
=== Group I ===
Pos	Team	Pld	W	D	L	GF	GA	GD	Pts
1	Pontevedra	38	29	7	2	86	15	+71	65
2	Ourense	38	20	13	5	48	17	+31	53
3	Fabril Deportivo	38	21	10	7	60	34	+26	52
4	Lugo	38	20	8	10	62	35	+27	48
5	Gran Peña	38	17	11	10	52	38	+14	45
6	Lalín	38	16	10	12	39	31	+8	42
7	Barco	38	13	15	10	49	39	+10	41
8	Céltiga	38	16	7	15	46	38	+8	39
9	Arenteiro	38	12	14	12	28	32	−4	38
10	Viveiro	38	10	16	12	44	49	−5	36
11	Noia	38	12	12	14	32	42	−10	36
12	Turista	38	12	11	15	40	38	+2	35
13	Lemos	38	12	10	16	46	49	−3	34
14	San Martín	38	12	9	17	46	64	−18	33
15	Tyde	38	12	8	18	44	64	−20	32
16	Alondras	38	14	4	20	40	60	−20	32
17	Vista Alegre	38	11	10	17	35	45	−10	32
18	Flavia	38	10	10	18	27	45	−18	30
19	Atlético Riveira	38	9	6	23	37	66	−29	24
20	Eume	38	3	7	28	22	82	−60	13

=== Group II ===
Pos	Team	Pld	W	D	L	GF	GA	GD	Pts
1	Caudal	38	25	9	4	74	25	+49	59
2	Siero	38	26	5	7	86	42	+44	57
3	Langreo	38	18	12	8	63	35	+28	48
4	Turón	38	17	12	9	50	30	+20	46
5	Real Oviedo Aficionado	38	16	14	8	67	44	+23	46
6	Gimnástica de Torrelavega	38	16	12	10	52	41	+11	44
7	San Martín	38	14	14	10	59	46	+13	42
8	Laredo	38	14	12	12	52	53	−1	40
9	Santoña	38	14	11	13	40	42	−2	39
10	Titánico	38	13	10	15	48	44	+4	36
11	Europa de Nava	38	15	6	17	55	67	−12	36
12	Naval	38	12	12	14	41	49	−8	36
13	Cayón	38	12	10	16	46	58	−12	34
14	Barquereño	38	10	14	14	40	63	−23	34
15	Castro	38	12	10	16	39	49	−10	34
16	Mosconia	38	12	7	19	48	63	−15	31
17	Rayo Cantabria	38	10	10	18	56	68	−12	30
18	Piloñesa	38	12	4	22	51	64	−13	28
19	Unión Club	38	8	8	22	33	67	−34	24
20	Buelna	38	4	8	26	30	80	−50	16

=== Group III ===
Pos	Team	Pld	W	D	L	GF	GA	GD	Pts
1	Santurtzi	38	22	15	1	64	23	+41	59
2	Eibar	38	23	8	7	55	25	+30	54
3	Durango	38	22	10	6	81	31	+50	54
4	Real Unión	38	23	3	12	74	45	+29	49
5	Getxo	38	17	12	9	48	36	+12	46
6	Arenas de Getxo	38	18	9	11	47	35	+12	45
7	Aurrerá de Ondarroa	38	16	13	9	56	37	+19	45
8	Baskonia	38	18	7	13	58	44	+14	43
9	Amorebieta	38	13	16	9	47	45	+2	42
10	Lemona	38	14	13	11	50	45	+5	41
11	Santutxu	38	16	9	13	42	46	−4	41
12	Deusto	38	11	10	17	36	51	−15	32
13	Bergara	38	10	11	17	36	48	−12	31
14	Gernika	38	7	14	17	25	47	−22	28
15	Anaitasuna	38	8	11	19	38	62	−24	27
16	Tolosa	38	7	13	18	33	55	−22	27
17	Aretxabaleta	38	8	11	19	35	61	−26	27
18	Ilintxa	38	10	7	21	41	62	−21	27
19	Mondragón	38	8	6	24	47	79	−32	22
20	Touring	38	7	6	25	36	72	−36	20

=== Group IV ===
Pos	Team	Pld	W	D	L	GF	GA	GD	Pts
1	Tudelano	38	23	10	5	80	29	+51	56
2	Numancia	38	17	16	5	68	35	+33	50
3	Corellano	38	15	16	7	61	34	+27	46
4	Calahorra	38	17	11	10	65	45	+20	45
5	Arnedo	38	18	8	12	67	45	+22	44
6	Sabiñánigo	38	16	11	11	58	51	+7	43
7	Atlético Monzón	38	15	12	11	70	50	+20	42
8	Alfaro	38	17	8	13	53	44	+9	42
9	Barbastro	38	17	8	13	64	55	+9	42
10	Mirandés	38	13	14	11	43	43	0	40
11	Atlético Cirbonero	38	14	9	15	54	56	−2	37
12	Tarazona	38	13	11	14	51	51	0	37
13	Alsasua	38	12	13	13	52	49	+3	37
14	Izarra	38	13	8	17	46	66	−20	34
15	Peña Sport	38	12	9	17	56	86	−30	33
16	Chantrea	38	12	7	19	52	64	−12	31
17	Utrillas	38	10	10	18	37	50	−13	30
18	Burladés	38	9	10	19	37	63	−26	28
19	Haro	38	9	10	19	49	69	−20	28
20	Jacetano	38	5	5	28	35	113	−78	15

=== Group V ===
Pos	Team	Pld	W	D	L	GF	GA	GD	Pts
1	FC Barcelona Aficionados	38	23	9	6	83	41	+42	55
2	Lloret	38	19	13	6	72	43	+29	51
3	Badalona	38	19	9	10	73	54	+19	47
4	Sant Andreu	38	17	13	8	59	36	+23	47
5	Granollers	38	18	9	11	59	51	+8	45
6	Europa	38	18	7	13	52	44	+8	43
7	Manresa	38	17	9	12	59	50	+9	43
8	Banyoles	38	17	8	13	63	52	+11	42
9	Girona	38	15	11	12	56	42	+14	41
10	Júpiter	38	12	16	10	49	40	+9	40
11	Santboià	38	12	11	15	50	52	−2	35
12	Olot	38	12	11	15	41	53	−12	35
13	Vilafranca	38	13	8	17	51	53	−2	34
14	Reus	38	11	12	15	41	53	−12	34
15	Horta	38	13	7	18	47	61	−14	33
16	Gavà	38	14	3	21	47	76	−29	31
17	Igualada	38	12	6	20	53	64	−11	30
18	Terrassa	38	7	16	15	41	56	−15	30
19	Tortosa	38	8	12	18	38	69	−31	28
20	Vic	38	5	6	27	44	88	−44	16

=== Group VI ===
Pos	Team	Pld	W	D	L	GF	GA	GD	Pts
1	Alzira	38	30	6	2	104	17	+87	66
2	Levante	38	27	4	7	70	15	+55	58
3	Mestalla	38	24	7	7	86	36	+50	55
4	Burriana	38	19	13	6	54	38	+16	51
5	Gandía	38	20	9	9	67	39	+28	49
6	Aspense	38	19	8	11	55	42	+13	46
7	Villajoyosa	38	17	8	13	53	40	+13	42
8	Ontinyent	38	12	13	13	44	52	−8	37
9	Vinaròs	38	13	9	16	45	61	−16	35
10	Novelda	38	12	10	16	35	52	−17	34
11	Catarroja	38	13	7	18	45	58	−13	33
12	Torrente	38	14	5	19	39	69	−30	33
13	Villarreal	38	11	11	16	43	47	−4	33
14	Rayo Ibense	38	11	11	16	52	56	−4	33
15	Benidorm	38	9	13	16	39	52	−13	31
16	Alicante	38	9	12	17	38	52	−14	30
17	Benicarló	38	12	5	21	40	62	−22	29
18	Carcaixent	38	9	9	20	40	69	−29	27
19	Vall de Uxó	38	8	8	22	37	77	−40	24
20	Paterna	38	4	6	28	26	78	−52	14

=== Group VII ===
Pos	Team	Pld	W	D	L	GF	GA	GD	Pts
1	Pegaso	38	24	7	7	71	42	+29	55
2	Real Madrid Aficionados (Note: Real Madrid Aficionados chose not to enter the promotion playoff)	38	18	17	3	58	26	+32	53
3	Manchego	38	20	12	6	60	36	+24	52
4	Conquense	38	19	11	8	51	37	+14	49
5	Ciempozuelos	38	17	8	13	70	61	+9	42
6	Real Ávila	38	16	9	13	65	50	+15	41
7	Leganés	38	14	12	12	62	39	+23	40
8	Móstoles	38	11	16	11	43	40	+3	38
9	Alcorcón	38	14	10	14	64	58	+6	38
10	Real Aranjuez	38	14	9	15	47	52	−5	37
11	Gimnástica Segoviana	38	14	9	15	45	55	−10	37
12	Guadalajara	38	11	14	13	61	71	−10	36
13	Atlético Madrileño	38	14	7	17	50	58	−8	35
14	Arganda	38	9	15	14	45	55	−10	33
15	Valdepeñas	38	11	10	17	48	56	−8	32
16	San Fernando de Henares	38	9	12	17	46	57	−11	30
17	Daimiel	38	9	12	17	35	61	−26	30
18	Carabanchel	38	10	9	19	33	62	−29	29
19	Torrejón	38	9	10	19	53	71	−18	28
20	Tarancón	38	7	11	20	48	68	−20	25

=== Group VIII ===
Pos	Team	Pld	W	D	L	GF	GA	GD	Pts
1	Burgos	38	28	6	4	111	21	+90	62
2	Cultural Leonesa	38	24	8	6	71	27	+44	56
3	Atlético Astorga	38	22	9	7	70	39	+31	53
4	Atlético Bembibre	38	21	8	9	61	33	+28	50
5	Ponferradina	38	21	8	9	61	37	+24	50
6	Real Valladolid Promesas	38	19	9	10	78	30	+48	47
7	Salmantino	38	16	14	8	56	35	+21	46
8	Toreno	38	15	10	13	40	39	+1	40
9	Salas	38	13	10	15	63	73	−10	36
10	Arandina	38	13	9	16	46	49	−3	35
11	Cristo Olímpico	38	13	9	16	43	66	−23	35
12	Universitario	38	10	13	15	53	61	−8	33
13	Toresana	38	13	5	20	38	65	−27	31
14	La Bañeza	38	10	10	18	41	54	−13	30
15	Coyanza	38	9	10	19	45	67	−22	28
16	Gimnástica Medinense	38	9	9	20	36	75	−39	27
17	Venta de Baños	38	8	10	20	38	63	−25	26
18	Cacabelense	38	7	12	19	34	74	−40	26
19	Guardo	39	11	4	24	43	74	−31	26
20	Ejido	38	7	9	22	32	78	−46	23

=== Group IX ===
Pos	Team	Pld	W	D	L	GF	GA	GD	Pts
1	Fuengirola	38	26	7	5	60	27	+33	59
2	Atlético Marbella	38	25	5	8	68	22	+46	55
3	San Pedro	38	22	5	11	67	43	+24	49
4	Villanueva	38	20	8	10	49	32	+17	48
5	Estepona	38	20	7	11	55	44	+11	47
6	Atlético Malagueño	38	19	9	10	65	35	+30	47
7	Alhaurino	38	19	8	11	73	45	+28	46
8	Atlético Benamiel	38	19	7	12	54	29	+25	45
9	Martos	38	19	6	13	75	42	+33	44
10	Melilla	38	17	8	13	48	41	+7	42
11	Atlético La Zubia	38	15	8	15	50	53	−3	38
12	Baza	38	16	4	18	58	61	−3	36
13	Industrial de Melilla	38	11	11	16	49	60	−11	33
14	Juventud de Torremolinos	38	10	12	16	50	65	−15	32
15	Atlético Macael	38	12	8	18	43	65	−22	32
16	Úbeda	38	10	12	16	51	62	−11	32
17	Loja	38	9	10	19	31	54	−23	28
18	Torreperogil	38	7	5	26	28	76	−48	19
19	Recreativo de Bailén	38	2	12	24	22	81	−59	16
20	Motril	38	4	4	30	31	99	−68	10 (Note: 2 points deducted)

=== Group X ===
Pos	Team	Pld	W	D	L	GF	GA	GD	Pts
1	Sevilla Atlético	38	25	6	7	88	36	+52	56
2	Betis Deportivo	38	24	6	8	79	31	+48	54
3	Atlético Sanluqueño	38	24	6	8	61	32	+29	54
4	Coria	38	20	7	11	50	28	+22	47
5	Mairena	38	18	10	10	55	33	+22	46
6	Iliturgi	38	19	7	12	61	49	+12	45
7	Imperio de Ceuta	38	17	8	13	45	39	+6	42
8	Rota	38	14	13	11	44	47	−3	41
9	Pozoblanco	38	16	8	14	62	44	+18	40
10	Huelva Promesas	38	13	13	12	63	56	+7	39
11	Brenes	38	14	9	15	50	45	+5	37
12	Moguer	38	12	12	14	36	45	−9	36
13	Puerto Real	38	14	8	16	46	51	−5	36
14	Rute	38	11	11	16	46	49	−3	33
15	Jerez Industrial	38	11	11	16	50	61	−11	33
16	Chiclana	38	7	17	14	41	61	−20	31
17	Ayamonte	38	9	10	19	28	63	−35	28
18	Alcalá	38	6	15	17	33	51	−18	27
19	Lucentino Industrial	38	2	15	21	33	83	−50	19
20	Riotinto	38	6	4	28	33	100	−67	16

=== Group XI ===
Pos	Team	Pld	W	D	L	GF	GA	GD	Pts
1	Constància	38	23	9	6	72	32	+40	55
2	Manacor	38	23	8	7	76	34	+42	54
3	Badía-Cala Millor	38	22	8	8	63	37	+26	52
4	Atlético Baleares	38	17	15	6	53	27	+26	49
5	Murense	38	21	7	10	72	55	+17	49
6	Sporting Mahonés	38	19	10	9	62	38	+24	48
7	Mallorca Atlético	38	18	11	9	63	40	+23	47
8	Portmany	38	18	8	12	67	45	+22	44
9	Alaior	38	15	8	15	49	49	0	38
10	Porreres	38	14	9	15	58	53	+5	37
11	Margaritense	38	15	6	17	51	55	−4	36
12	Ferreries	38	12	12	14	44	40	+4	36
13	Felanitx	38	12	8	18	53	62	−9	32
14	Porto Cristo	38	11	9	18	49	66	−17	31
15	Calvià	38	11	7	20	59	73	−14	29
16	Artà	38	11	7	20	37	55	−18	29
17	Xilvar	38	10	7	21	32	69	−37	27
18	Ses Salines	38	8	10	20	40	91	−51	26
19	Santanyí	38	6	13	19	44	77	−33	25
20	Binissalem	38	6	4	28	34	80	−46	16

=== Group XII ===
Pos	Team	Pld	W	D	L	GF	GA	GD	Pts
1	Güímar	38	27	6	5	98	35	+63	60
2	Mensajero	38	24	10	4	76	17	+59	56 (Note: 2 points deducted)
3	Las Palmas Atlético	38	24	3	11	91	39	+52	51
4	Maspalomas	38	22	5	11	80	40	+40	49
5	Puerto de la Cruz	38	21	6	11	67	44	+23	48
6	Icodense	38	19	8	11	62	48	+14	46
7	Unión Tejina	38	16	7	15	61	60	+1	39
8	Realejos	38	15	9	14	56	57	−1	39
9	Tenisca	38	14	10	14	54	50	+4	38
10	Lanzarote	38	14	10	14	44	55	−11	38
11	San Andrés	38	13	12	13	50	62	−12	38
12	Las Torres	38	14	8	16	46	52	−6	36
13	Telde	38	14	8	16	52	66	−14	36
14	Marino	38	11	13	14	48	64	−16	35
15	Orotava	38	10	11	17	52	73	−21	31
16	Estrella	38	11	8	19	45	60	−15	30
17	Salud	38	10	10	18	51	59	−8	30
18	San Antonio	38	11	3	24	52	79	−27	25
19	Tamaraceite	38	4	9	25	33	116	−83	17
20	Real Artesano	38	6	4	28	40	82	−42	16

=== Group XIII ===
Pos	Team	Pld	W	D	L	GF	GA	GD	Pts
1	Eldense	38	25	8	5	72	25	+47	58
2	Orihuela	38	21	11	6	75	33	+42	53
3	Torre Pacheco	38	18	13	7	70	43	+27	49
4	Yeclano	38	20	7	11	90	64	+26	47
5	Ilicitano	38	20	6	12	70	44	+26	46
6	Torrevieja	38	15	14	9	40	42	−2	44
7	Almansa	38	17	7	14	62	45	+17	41
8	Villarrobledo	38	14	13	11	59	42	+17	41
9	Torreagüera	38	16	7	15	50	46	+4	39
10	Imperial	38	13	13	12	56	39	+17	39
11	Jumilla	38	15	8	15	55	58	−3	38
12	Alcantarilla	38	14	10	14	57	58	−1	38
13	Olímpico Juvenil	38	14	9	15	59	52	+7	37
14	Caravaca	38	12	12	14	51	50	+1	36
15	Cieza	38	13	9	16	50	58	−8	35
16	Atlético Albacete	38	12	8	18	48	55	−7	32
17	Águilas	38	12	5	21	44	65	−21	29
18	Atlético Muleño	38	6	10	22	28	66	−38	22
19	Molinense	38	6	9	23	30	94	−64	21
20	Huercalense	38	4	7	27	30	117	−87	15

=== Group XIV ===
Pos	Team	Pld	W	D	L	GF	GA	GD	Pts
1	Díter Zafra	38	27	5	6	99	28	+71	59
2	Plasencia	38	26	6	6	78	15	+63	58
3	Cacereño	38	22	10	6	88	25	+63	54
4	Extremadura	38	25	4	9	74	26	+48	54
5	Don Benito	38	20	8	10	74	48	+26	48
6	Mérida Industrial	38	18	11	9	51	26	+25	47
7	Moralo	38	17	10	11	53	40	+13	44
8	Montijo	38	13	15	10	51	43	+8	41
9	Villanovense	38	14	12	12	45	33	+12	40
10	Villafranca	38	15	8	15	52	58	−6	38
11	La Estrella	38	15	6	17	66	52	+14	36
12	Azuaga	38	12	9	17	37	63	−26	33
13	Olivenza	38	10	11	17	45	77	−32	31
14	Calamonte	38	10	11	17	51	83	−32	31
15	Badajoz Promesas	38	13	3	22	50	65	−15	29
16	Sanvicenteño	38	9	10	19	34	70	−36	28
17	Fuente de Cantos	38	9	9	20	35	80	−45	27
18	Puebla Patria	38	7	10	21	23	63	−40	24
19	Quintana	38	8	5	25	34	92	−58	21
20	Llerenense	38	3	11	24	26	79	−53	17

== Promotion playoff ==
=== First round ===
Team 1	Agg.	Team 2	1st leg	2nd leg
Cultural Leonesa	1–0	Eldense	0–0	1–0
Fuengirola	1–6	Levante	0–0	1–6
Eibar	3–1	Constància	1–0	2–1
Manacor	4–3	Díter Zafra	0–1	4–2
Tudelano	1–2	Atlético Marbella	1–0	0–2
Manchego	4–4 (p)	Caudal	2–1	2–3
Orihuela	4–3	Sevilla Atlético	3–0	1–3
Siero	5–3	Güímar	2–0	3–3
Mensajero	2–6	Pontevedra	2–1	0–5
Santurtzi	0–3	Ourense	0–0	0–3
Alzira	2–3	Pegaso	1–1	1–2
Burgos	1–4	FC Barcelona Aficionados	1–0	0–4

=== Final Round ===
Team 1	Agg.	Team 2	1st leg	2nd leg
Pontevedra	3–0	Eibar	3–0	0–0
Caudal	0–3	Orihuela	0–1	0–2
Atlético Marbella	3–1	Siero	3–0	0–1
Manacor	6–1	Pegaso	4–0	2–1
Levante	2–1	Ourense	1–0	1–1
Cultural Leonesa	1–3	FC Barcelona Aficionados	1–1	0–2

== Season records ==
- Most wins: 30, Alzira.
- Most draws: 17, Chiclana.
- Most losses: 30, Motril.
- Most goals for: 111, Burgos.
- Most goals against: 117, Huercalense.
- Most points: 66, Alzira.
- Fewest wins: 2, Recreativo de Bailén and Lucentino Industrial.
- Fewest draws: 3, 5 teams.
- Fewest losses: 1, Santurtzi.
- Fewest goals for: 22, Eume and Recreativo de Bailén.
- Fewest goals against: 15, Pontevedra, Levante and Plasencia.
- Fewest points: 10, Motril.
