= Santutxu FC =

Association football club in Spain

Coordinates: 43.260919°N 2.919909°W

Santutxu
- Full name: Santutxu Fútbol Club
- Founded: 1918; 108 years ago
- Stadium: Estadio Maiona
- Capacity: 4,000
- President: José María Ruiz
- Head coach: Juan Carlos Marco
- League: División de Honor
- 2025–26: División de Honor, 6th of 18
Home colours	Away colours

Santutxu Fútbol Club (Basque: Santutxu Futbol Kluba) is a Spanish football team based in Bilbao, in the autonomous community of Basque Country. Founded in 1918, it plays in División de Honor, holding home matches at Estadio Maiona, which has a capacity of 4.000 spectators.

Ibai Gómez, of Athletic Bilbao and Alavés, began his footballing career at Santutxu.

== Season to season ==
Season	Tier	Division	Place	Copa del Rey
1928–29	6	2ª Reg.	2nd	
1929–30	6	2ª Reg.	7th	
1930–31	6	2ª Reg.	6th	
1931–32	6	2ª Reg.	7th	
1932–33	6	2ª Reg.	7th	
1933–34	6	2ª Reg.	4th	
1934–35	5	2ª Reg. P.	3rd	
1935–36	5	2ª Reg. P.	3rd	
1939–40	6	2ª Reg.	2nd	
1940–41	6	2ª Reg.	5th	
1941–42	DNP			
1942–43	DNP			
1943–44	DNP			
1944–45	5	2ª Reg.	1st	
1945–46	5	2ª Reg.	6th	
1946–47	5	2ª Reg.	5th	
1947–48	5	2ª Reg.	2nd	
1948–49	5	2ª Reg.	7th	
1949–50	6	3ª Reg.	4th	
1950–51	6	3ª Reg.	5th	

Season	Tier	Division	Place	Copa del Rey
1951–52	6	3ª Reg.	6th	
1952–53	6	3ª Reg.	6th	
1953–54	6	3ª Reg.	6th	
1954–55	6	3ª Reg.	3rd	
1955–56	6	3ª Reg.	5th	
1956–57	5	2ª Reg.	5th	
1957–58	5	2ª Reg.	5th	
1958–59	5	2ª Reg.	8th	
1959–60	5	2ª Reg.	12th	
1960–61	5	2ª Reg.	13th	
1961–62	5	2ª Reg.	9th	
1962–63	5	2ª Reg.	1st	
1963–64	4	1ª Reg.	10th	
1964–65	4	1ª Reg.	15th	
1965–66	5	2ª Reg.	8th	
1966–67	5	2ª Reg.	9th	
1967–68	5	2ª Reg.	6th	
1968–69	5	1ª Reg.	8th	
1969–70	5	1ª Reg.	4th	
1970–71	4	Reg. Pref.	6th	

Season	Tier	Division	Place	Copa del Rey
1971–72	4	Reg. Pref.	5th	
1972–73	4	Reg. Pref.	3rd	
1973–74	4	Reg. Pref.	9th	
1974–75	4	Reg. Pref.	14th	
1975–76	4	Reg. Pref.	10th	
1976–77	4	Reg. Pref.	8th	
1977–78	5	Reg. Pref.	9th	
1978–79	5	Reg. Pref.	3rd	
1979–80	5	Reg. Pref.	1st	
1980–81	4	3ª	15th	
1981–82	4	3ª	11th	
1982–83	4	3ª	10th	
1983–84	4	3ª	11th	
1984–85	4	3ª	16th	
1985–86	4	3ª	14th	
1986–87	4	3ª	20th	
1987–88	5	Reg. Pref.	14th	
1988–89	5	Reg. Pref.	10th	
1989–90	5	Reg. Pref.	12th	
1990–91	5	Terr. Pref.	1st	

Season	Tier	Division	Place	Copa del Rey
1991–92	4	3ª	7th	
1992–93	4	3ª	20th	First round
1993–94	5	Terr. Pref.	3rd	
1994–95	5	Terr. Pref.	17th	
1995–96	6	1ª Terr.	3rd	
1996–97	6	1ª Terr.	2nd	
1997–98	5	Terr. Pref.	4th	
1998–99	5	Terr. Pref.	8th	
1999–2000	5	Terr. Pref.	8th	
2000–01	5	Terr. Pref.	19th	
2001–02	6	1ª Terr.	1st	
2002–03	5	Div. Hon.	4th	
2003–04	5	Div. Hon.	10th	
2004–05	5	Div. Hon.	11th	
2005–06	5	Div. Hon.	1st	
2006–07	4	3ª	18th	
2007–08	5	Div. Hon.	10th	
2008–09	5	Div. Hon.	3rd	
2009–10	5	Div. Hon.	3rd	
2010–11	4	3ª	11th	

Season	Tier	Division	Place	Copa del Rey
2011–12	4	3ª	15th	
2012–13	4	3ª	16th	
2013–14	4	3ª	11th	
2014–15	4	3ª	13th	
2015–16	4	3ª	7th	
2016–17	4	3ª	16th	
2017–18	4	3ª	13th	
2018–19	4	3ª	11th	
2019–20	4	3ª	9th	
2020–21	4	3ª	5th / 3rd	
2021–22	5	3ª RFEF	16th	
2022–23	6	Div. Hon.	8th	
2023–24	6	Div. Hon.	6th	
2024–25	6	Div. Hon.	11th	
2025–26	6	Div. Hon.	6th	
2026–27	6	Div. Hon.		

- 21 seasons in Tercera División
- 1 season in Tercera División RFEF

== See also ==
- Category:Santutxu FC players
