= CD Torre Pacheco =

Spanish football club

Torre Pacheco
- Full name: Club Deportivo Torre Pacheco
- Founded: 1956
- Dissolved: 1997
- Ground: Municipal Virgen del Pasico; Torre Pacheco, Murcia, Spain
- Capacity: 1,000
- 1996–97: Tercera División - Group 13, retired
Home colours

Club Deportivo Torre Pacheco was a Spanish football club based in Torre Pacheco, in the Region of Murcia. Founded in 1956 and dissolved in 1997, it held home games at Polideportivo Municipal Virgen del Pasico.

== Season to season ==
Season	Tier	Division	Place	Copa del Rey
1956–57	5	2ª Reg.	1st	
1957–58	4	1ª Reg.	2nd	
1958–59	4	1ª Reg.	2nd	
1959–60	4	1ª Reg.	10th	
1960–61	4	1ª Reg.	15th	
1961–1966	DNP			
1966–67	4	1ª Reg.	10th	
1967–68	4	1ª Reg.	6th	
1968–69	4	1ª Reg.	12th	
1969–70	4	1ª Reg.	8th	
1970–71	4	1ª Reg.	13th	
1971–72	4	Reg. Pref.	17th	
1972–73	4	Reg. Pref.	20th	
1973–74	5	1ª Reg.	17th	
1974–75	5	1ª Reg.	17th	
1975–76	6	2ª Reg.	1st	
1976–77	5	1ª Reg.	4th	
1977–78	5	Reg. Pref.	20th	
1978–79	6	1ª Reg.	5th	

Season	Tier	Division	Place	Copa del Rey
1979–80	6	1ª Reg.	5th	
1980–81	5	Reg. Pref.	2nd	
1981–82	4	3ª	6th	
1982–83	4	3ª	8th	Second round
1983–84	4	3ª	3rd	
1984–85	4	3ª	15th	First round
1985–86	4	3ª	11th	
1986–87	4	3ª	5th	
1987–88	4	3ª	10th	First round
1988–89	4	3ª	13th	
1989–90	4	3ª	8th	
1990–91	4	3ª	20th	
1991–92	5	Reg. Pref.	4th	
1992–93	4	3ª	7th	
1993–94	4	3ª	3rd	
1994–95	4	3ª	9th	
1995–96	4	3ª	12th	
1996–97	4	3ª	(R)	

- 15 seasons in Tercera División
