= Bergara KE =

Bergara
- Full name: Bergara Kirol Elkartea
- Founded: 1952
- Ground: Agorrosin, Bergara, Basque Country, Spain
- Capacity: 2,000
- President: Iosu Elorza
- Manager: Iker Ruiz de Larramendi
- League: División de Honor
- 2025–26: División de Honor, 12th of 18
Home colours	Away colours

Bergara Kirol Elkartea is a Spanish football team based in Bergara, Gipuzkoa, in the autonomous community of Basque Country. Founded in 1952, they play in División de Honor, holding home games at Campo Polideportivo de Agorrosin, which has a capacity of 2,000 spectators.

== History ==
=== Club background ===
- Club Deportivo Vergara (1952–1982)
- Club Deportivo Bergara (1982–1993)
- Bergara Kirol Elkartea (1993–)

== Season to season ==
Season	Tier	Division	Place	Copa del Rey
1952–53	4	1ª Reg.	14th	
1953–54	4	1ª Reg.	13th	
1954–55	4	1ª Reg.	6th	
1955–56	4	1ª Reg.	5th	
1956–57	4	1ª Reg.	5th	
1957–58	4	1ª Reg.	1st	
1958–59	3	3ª	4th	
1959–60	3	3ª	3rd	
1960–61	3	3ª	9th	
1961–62	3	3ª	3rd	
1962–63	3	3ª	16th	
1963–64	4	1ª Reg.	11th	
1964–65	4	1ª Reg.	2nd	
1965–66	4	1ª Reg.	6th	
1966–67	4	1ª Reg.	3rd	
1967–68	4	1ª Reg.	6th	
1968–69	4	1ª Reg.	16th	
1969–70	5	2ª Reg.	5th	
1970–71	5	2ª Reg.	1st	
1971–72	4	1ª Reg.	13th	

Season	Tier	Division	Place	Copa del Rey
1972–73	4	1ª Reg.	9th	
1973–74	4	1ª Reg.	1st	
1974–75	4	Reg. Pref.	8th	
1975–76	4	Reg. Pref.	18th	
1976–77	5	1ª Reg.	3rd	
1977–78	5	Reg. Pref.	14th	
1978–79	5	Reg. Pref.	13th	
1979–80	5	Reg. Pref.	3rd	
1980–81	4	3ª	8th	
1981–82	4	3ª	14th	
1982–83	4	3ª	16th	
1983–84	4	3ª	13th	
1984–85	4	3ª	9th	
1985–86	4	3ª	19th	
1986–87	5	Reg. Pref.	12th	
1987–88	5	Reg. Pref.	12th	
1988–89	5	Reg. Pref.	10th	
1989–90	5	Reg. Pref.	11th	
1990–91	5	Reg. Pref.	19th	
1991–92	6	1ª Reg.	3rd	

Season	Tier	Division	Place	Copa del Rey
1992–93	5	Reg. Pref.	5th	
1993–94	5	Reg. Pref.	4th	
1994–95	5	Reg. Pref.	9th	
1995–96	5	Reg. Pref.	9th	
1996–97	5	Reg. Pref.	17th	
1997–98	6	1ª Reg.	1st	
1998–99	5	Reg. Pref.	1st	
1999–2000	4	3ª	16th	
2000–01	4	3ª	19th	
2001–02	5	Reg. Pref.	5th	
2002–03	5	Reg. Pref.	3rd	
2003–04	5	Reg. Pref.	13th	
2004–05	5	Reg. Pref.	19th	
2005–06	6	1ª Reg.	2nd	
2006–07	6	1ª Reg.	10th	
2007–08	6	1ª Reg.	3rd	
2008–09	6	1ª Reg.	1st	
2009–10	5	Div. Hon.	13th	
2010–11	5	Div. Hon.	9th	
2011–12	5	Div. Hon.	11th	

Season	Tier	Division	Place	Copa del Rey
2012–13	5	Div. Hon.	8th	
2013–14	5	Div. Hon.	15th	
2014–15	5	Div. Hon.	16th	
2015–16	6	Pref.	3rd	
2016–17	6	Pref.	1st	
2017–18	5	Div. Hon.	5th	
2018–19	5	Div. Hon.	14th	
2019–20	5	Div. Hon.	15th	
2020–21	5	Div. Hon.	2nd	
2021–22	6	Div. Hon.	7th	
2022–23	6	Div. Hon.	13th	
2023–24	6	Div. Hon.	4th	
2024–25	6	Div. Hon.	5th	
2025–26	6	Div. Hon.		

- 13 seasons in Tercera División
