= Alfonso del Barrio =

Spanish footballer (born 1957)

Personal information
- Full name: Luis Alfonso del Barrio Michelena
- Date of birth: 23 September 1957 (age 69)
- Place of birth: Barakaldo, Spain
- Height: 1.77 m (5 ft 10 in)
- Position: Midfielder

Team information
- Current team: Somorrostro (president)

Senior career*
Years	Team	Apps	(Gls)
1977–1978	Bilbao Athletic	22	(2)
1978–1981	Sestao River	88	(7)
1981–1982	Linares	50	(3)
1982–1986	Real Murcia	103	(7)
1986–1989	Elche	64	(3)
1989–1991	Sestao River	34	(5)
Total		361	(27)

Managerial career
- 1997–1999: Barakaldo
- 1999–2000: Recreativo Huelva
- 2000–2001: Barakaldo
- 2001: Alavés B
- 2002–2003: Gimnástica Torrelavega
- 2000–2001: Barakaldo
- 2004: Palencia
- 2004: Novelda
- 2006–2008: Palencia
- 2009–2010: Sestao River
- 2010–2011: Barakaldo
- 2019–2020: Gimnástica Torrelavega
- * Club domestic league appearances and goals

Luis Alfonso del Barrio Michelena (born 23 September 1957) is a Spanish former football player and manager. He is the current president of JD Somorrostro.

After a playing career as a midfielder, he began managing in 1997, in the first of three spells at Barakaldo. He spent most of his managerial career in Segunda División B, and had a brief spell in the Segunda División with Recreativo de Huelva. From 2013 to 2018 he was director of football at Sestao River Club.

== Playing career ==
Born in Barakaldo in the Basque Country, Del Barrio came through the youth ranks of local Athletic Bilbao, but only made it to the reserve team. He made 67 La Liga appearances and scored 3 goals for Real Murcia and Elche, as well as 184 Segunda División games and 15 goals for Linares, Murcia, Elche and Sestao River. He won the second division title with Murcia in 1982–83 and 1985–86.

== Managerial career ==
Del Barrio began managing his hometown club Barakaldo CF, twice falling at the promotion playoffs in Segunda División B. He then joined Recreativo de Huelva in the second tier in 1999–2000; he was sacked in January and his run included a five-game losing streak.

After a return to Barakaldo and a brief spell at Alavés B, Del Barrio was hired at Gimnástica de Torrelavega in 2002–03. He then joined Palencia in January 2004, beating Real Madrid Castilla in his first home match. Later in the year he signed for Novelda, leaving by mutual consent in December with the team in the relegation places.

In 2006, Del Barrio returned to Palencia, reaching the playoffs (semi-final defeat to Huesca) in his first season. He was sacked in March 2008 after a 3–1 home loss to Logroñés, with the club having the significant expense of paying out the final two years of his contract.

Del Barrio joined Sestao River as manager in February 2009, with the club three points from the relegation zone. He helped the team avoid the drop in what remained of the season, but their four-year spell in the third tier ended with relegation in 2009–10, despite a 1–0 win at Lugo on the last day.

In December 2010, Del Barrio returned for a third spell at Barakaldo. He was dismissed in March having no wins and six draws from his 13 games, with the team nine points inside the relegation zone.

Del Barrio went back to Sestao in 2013, just before the end of the season, and one of his first acts was to fire manager José Luis Ribera. He then hired Ángel Viadero, who won the group in 2013–14 but fell at the play-offs. Financial problems led to players being sold, and the team were relegated to the Tercera División in 2017, with the subsequent failure to be promoted back leading to Del Barrio's dismissal in May 2018.

After 16 years away, Del Barrio returned to Gimnástica Torrelavega in June 2019. Early in the new year he left by mutual consent, having won 12 and lost 3 of his 19 league games, and reached the final of the Copa Federación before defeat to Tropezón.
