= Divisiones Regionales de Fútbol in the Basque Country =

The Divisiones Regionales de Fútbol in the Basque Country are ultimately overseen by the Basque Football Federation which operates Group 4 of the Tercera Federación, the fifth tier of the Spanish football league system divided among each of the country's autonomous regions. However, unlike most of the regions, the leagues in the sixth tier and below are organised by three separate federations, corresponding to the provinces of Álava, Biscay and Gipuzkoa. The other region with this arrangement is the Canary Islands which has two provincial forks to its amateur setup, while Andalusia and the Balearic Islands have two and three parallel divisions respectively under the same umbrella.

== League chronology ==
Timeline – Álava

- The regional categories of Álava were included in Gipuzkoa until 1987

Timeline – Gipuzkoa

Timeline – Biscay

== Álava ==

=== División de Honor de Álava ===
Arabako Ohorezko Maila Preferente de Álava
- Founded: Unknown
- Country: Spain
- Number of clubs: 16
- Level on pyramid: 6
- Promotion to: 3ª Federación - Group 4
- Relegation to: Regional Preferente
- Domestic cup: None
- Website: Official website

The División de Honor de Álava or Arabako Ohorezko Maila is at the sixth level of Spanish football. All of the clubs are based in the province of Álava. The league consists of 18 teams. At the end of the season, the top club is promoted automatically to the Tercera Federación - Group 4. The teams finishing second play a promotion play-off depending on the number of vacancies in the Tercera División. Two clubs are relegated to Primera Regional.

==== 2025–26 season teams ====
Teams
- Abetxuko
- Alegría
- Amurrio
- Arambizkarra
- Ariznabarra
- Colegio San Prudencio
- Ipar Arriaga
- Iru-Bat Santa Lucía
- Lakua Arriaga
- Laudio
- Marianistas
- Mercedarias
- Salvatierra
- San Ignacio B
- San Viator
- Zuia

=== Regional Preferente de Álava ===
Primera Regional de Álava
- Founded: Unknown
- Country: Spain
- Number of clubs: 20
- Level on pyramid: 7
- Promotion to: Preferente
- Relegation to: None
- Domestic cup: None
- Website: Official website

The Regional Preferente is the seventh and lowest level of competition in Álava.

==== 2025–26 season teams ====
Teams
- Abetxuko B
- Amurrio B
- Arambizkarra B
- Askiola Okondo
- Aurrerá de Vitoria B
- Batzarre
- Ayuda Condado Treviño
- Campezo
- Colegio San Prudencio B
- Giltzarrapo
- Ipar Arriaga B
- Iru-Bat Santa Lucía B
- Izarra Gorri
- Lakua Arriaga B
- Lakua Vitoria
- Lantarón
- Marianistas KEB
- Mariturrikoak
- Mercedarias B
- Nanclares
- San Martín
- Urgatzi
- Zaramaga

== Gipuzkoa ==

=== División de Honor de Guipúzcoa ===
Gipuzkoako Ohorezko Maila División de Honor de Guipúzcoa
- Founded: Unknown
- Country: Spain
- Number of clubs: 18
- Level on pyramid: 6
- Promotion to: 3ª Federación - Group 4
- Relegation to: Regional Preferente
- Domestic cup: None
- Website: Official website

The División de Honor de Guipúzcoa or Gipuzkoako Ohorezko Maila is at the sixth level of Spanish football. All of the clubs are based in the province of Gipuzkoa. The league consists of 18 teams. At the end of the season, the first team is promoted automatically to Tercera Federación - Group 4. The team finishing second plays a promotion play-off depending on the number of vacancies seats in the Tercera División. Four clubs are relegated to Regional Preferente.

==== 2025–26 season teams ====
Teams
- CD Amaikak Bat
- Anaitasuna FT
- SD Beasain B
- Bergara KE
- Beti Gazte KJKE
- Deusto Donostia FT
- CD Elgoibar
- SD Euskalduna
- CD Hernani
- Mondragón CF
- Mutriku FT
- Oiartzun KE
- Orioko FT
- Real Unión B
- Tolosa CF
- CD Urki
- SD Urola KE
- Zumaiako FT

=== Preferente de Guipúzcoa ===
Preferente de Guipúzcoa
- Founded: Unknown
- Country: Spain
- Number of clubs: 32; 2 groups of 16
- Level on pyramid: 7
- Promotion to: División de Honor
- Relegation to: Primera Regional
- Domestic cup: None
- Website: Official website

The Preferente is played in two groups of 16 teams. At the end of the season, the champions and the winner of the playoff between the runners-up are promoted to División de Honor. Three clubs in each group are relegated to Primera Regional.

==== Some teams playing in this level ====
- Mondragón CF
- CD Vasconia
- Zestoa KB

=== Primera Regional de Guipúzcoa ===
Primera Regional
- Founded: Unknown
- Country: Spain
- Number of clubs: 40; 5 groups
- Level on pyramid: 8
- Promotion to: División de Honor
- Relegation to: None
- Domestic cup: None
- Website: Official website

The Primera Regional is played with five groups of 8 teams. At the end of the season, the top four from each group advance to Fase de Ascenso while the other 16 teams play in Copa de Gipuzkoa. The Fase de Ascenso has two groups of 10 with the two winners and runners-up being promoted to Regional Preferente. The two 3rd placed finishers playoff to fill any vacancies.

== Biscay ==

=== División de Honor de Vizcaya ===
Bizkaiko Ohorezko Maila División de Honor de Vizcaya
- Founded: Unknown
- Country: Spain
- Number of clubs: 18
- Level on pyramid: 6
- Promotion to: 3ª Federación - Group 4
- Relegation to: Territorial Preferente
- Domestic cup: None
- Website: Official website

The División de Honor de Vizcaya or Bizkaiko Ohorezko Maila is at the sixth level of Spanish football. All of the clubs are based in the province of Biscay. The league consists of 18 teams. At the end of the season, the top club is promoted automatically to the Tercera Federación - Group 4. The teams finishing second play a promotion play-off depending on the number of vacancies in the Tercera División. Two clubs are relegated to Territorial Preferente.

==== 2026–27 season teams ====
Teams
- Abanto Club
- SD Amorebieta B
- Aurrerá Ondarroa
- CD Basconia B
- SD Balmaseda FC
- Bermeo FT
- SD Deusto
- CD Getxo
- SD Indautxu
- SD Iturrigorri
- CD Padura
- SD San Pedro
- Santutxu FC
- JD Somorrostro
- Urduliz FT
- CD Uritarra
- Zalla UC
- Zamudio SD

=== Preferente de Vizcaya ===
Preferente
- Founded: Unknown
- Country: Spain
- Number of clubs: 18
- Level on pyramid: 7
- Promotion to: División de Honor
- Relegation to: Primera División
- Domestic cup: None
- Website: Official website

The Preferente de Vizcaya is at the seventh level of Spanish football. All of the clubs are based in the province of Biscay. The league consists of 18 teams. At the end of the season, the top three clubs are promoted to División de Honor. Three clubs are relegated to the Primera División de Bizkaia.

==== Some teams playing in this level ====
- Apurtuarte Club

=== Primera División de Bizkaia ===
Primera División de Bizkaia
- Founded: Unknown
- Country: Spain
- Number of clubs: 36; two groups of 18
- Level on pyramid: 8
- Promotion to: Preferente
- Relegation to: Segunda División
- Domestic cup: None
- Website: Official website

The Primera División de Bizkaia is played in two groups of 18 teams. the champion and runner-up of both groups are promoted to Preferente de Bizkaia. The 3rd placed finishers play off to fill any vacancies. Two clubs in each group are relegated to the Segunda División de Bizkaia.

=== Segunda División de Bizkaia ===
Segunda División de Bizkaia
- Founded: Unknown
- Country: Spain
- Number of clubs: 36; 2 groups of 18
- Level on pyramid: 9
- Promotion to: Primera División
- Relegation to: Tercera División
- Domestic cup: None
- Website: Official website

The Segunda División de Bizkaia is played in two groups of 16. At the end of the season, the two champions and runners-up are promoted to the Primera División de Bizkaia. the 3rd placed teams playoff to fill any vacancies. three clubs in each group are relegated to Tercera División de Bizkaia.

=== Tercera División de Bizkaia ===
Tercera División de Bizkaia
- Founded: 2009
- Country: Spain
- Number of clubs: 74; 5 groups
- Level on pyramid: 10
- Promotion to: Segunda División
- Relegation to: None
- Domestic cup: None
- Website: Official website

The Tercera División de Bizkaia is played with 74 teams in one group of 14 and five groups of 15. At the end of the season, the champions and runners-up are promoted. the 3rd placed teams advance to playoff league to fill any vacancies.

== See also ==
- Basque Football Federation
- Biscay Championship
- Gipuzkoa Championship
