= SD San Pedro =

Spanish football club from Basque Country

Coordinates: 43.310790°N 3.009775°W

San Pedro
- Full name: Sociedad Deportiva San Pedro
- Founded: 1923
- Ground: Las Llanas, Sestao, Basque Country, Spain
- Capacity: 8,900
- Chairman: Juan Antonio Lazkano
- Manager: Jose Luis Pérez
- League: División de Honor
- 2024–25: División de Honor, 14th of 18
Home colours	Away colours

Sociedad Deportiva San Pedro is a Spanish football team based in Sestao, in the autonomous community of Basque Country. Founded in 1923 it plays in División de Honor, holding home games at Estadio Las Llanas, with a capacity of 8,000 seats.

The kit manufacturer is Umbro.

== History ==
The club was founded in 1923. It has a curious story of their equipment choice. When the SD San Pedro was founded, it was agreed to choose as their colors those of the winning club of the 1923 Spanish Championship, which happened to be Barcelona.

== Season to season ==
Season	Tier	Division	Place	Copa del Rey
1939–40	6	2ª Reg.	2nd	
1940–41	6	2ª Reg.	4th	
1941–42	5	2ª Reg.	3rd	
1942–43	5	2ª Reg.	2nd	
1943–44	5	2ª Reg.	1st	
1944–45	4	1ª Reg.	3rd	
1945–46	4	1ª Reg.	6th	
1946–47	5	2ª Reg.	8th	
1947–48	5	2ª Reg.	5th	
1948–49	5	2ª Reg.	4th	
1949–50	6	3ª Reg.	2nd	
1950–51	6	3ª Reg.	3rd	
1951–52	6	3ª Reg.	4th	
1952–53	6	3ª Reg.	4th	
1953–54	6	3ª Reg.	2nd	
1954–55	5	2ª Reg.	11th	
1955–56	5	2ª Reg.	9th	
1956–57	5	2ª Reg.	4th	
1957–58	5	2ª Reg.	13th	
1958–59	5	2ª Reg.	6th	

Season	Tier	Division	Place	Copa del Rey
1959–60	5	2ª Reg.	5th	
1960–61	5	2ª Reg.	11th	
1961–62	5	2ª Reg.	3rd	
1962–63	4	1ª Reg.	11th	
1963–64	4	1ª Reg.	14th	
1964–65	4	1ª Reg.	13th	
1965–66	5	2ª Reg.	5th	
1966–67	5	2ª Reg.	7th	
1967–68	5	2ª Reg.	3rd	
1968–69	6	2ª Reg.	2nd	
1969–70	5	1ª Reg.	9th	
1970–71	5	1ª Reg.	11th	
1971–72	5	1ª Reg.	3rd	
1972–73	4	Reg. Pref.	15th	
1973–74	4	Reg. Pref.	10th	
1974–75	4	Reg. Pref.	19th	
1975–76	5	1ª Reg.	9th	
1976–77	5	1ª Reg.	2nd	
1977–78	5	Reg. Pref.	20th	
1978–79	6	1ª Reg.	11th	

Season	Tier	Division	Place	Copa del Rey
1979–80	6	1ª Reg.	11th	
1980–81	6	1ª Reg.	11th	
1981–82	6	1ª Reg.	4th	
1982–83	5	Reg. Pref.	13th	
1983–84	5	Reg. Pref.	11th	
1984–85	5	Reg. Pref.	14th	
1985–86	5	Reg. Pref.	14th	
1986–87	5	Reg. Pref.	18th	
1987–88	6	1ª Reg.	5th	
1988–89	6	1ª Reg.	5th	
1989–90	6	1ª Reg.	2nd	
1990–91	5	Terr. Pref.	7th	
1991–92	5	Terr. Pref.	6th	
1992–93	5	Terr. Pref.	9th	
1993–94	5	Terr. Pref.	8th	
1994–95	5	Terr. Pref.	9th	
1995–96	5	Terr. Pref.	2nd	
1996–97	4	3ª	12th	
1997–98	4	3ª	5th	
1998–99	4	3ª	9th	

Season	Tier	Division	Place	Copa del Rey
1999–2000	4	3ª	17th	
2000–01	4	3ª	12th	
2001–02	4	3ª	11th	
2002–03	4	3ª	18th	
2003–04	5	Div. Hon.	2nd	
2004–05	4	3ª	12th	
2005–06	4	3ª	7th	
2006–07	4	3ª	15th	
2007–08	4	3ª	18th	
2008–09	5	Div. Hon.	8th	
2009–10	5	Div. Hon.	5th	
2010–11	5	Div. Hon.	12th	
2011–12	5	Div. Hon.	13th	
2012–13	5	Div. Hon.	18th	
2013–14	6	Pref.	8th	
2014–15	6	Pref.	4th	
2015–16	6	Pref.	2nd	
2016–17	5	Div. Hon.	2nd	
2017–18	5	Div. Hon.	1st	
2018–19	4	3ª	19th	

Season	Tier	Division	Place	Copa del Rey
2019–20	5	Div. Hon.	5th	
2020–21	5	Div. Hon.	14th	
2021–22	6	Div. Hon.	4th	
2022–23	6	Div. Hon.	7th	
2023–24	6	Div. Hon.	12th	
2024–25	6	Div. Hon.	14th	
2025–26	6	Div. Hon.		

- 11 seasons in Tercera División
