= JD Somorrostro =

Spanish football team

Somorrostro
- Full name: Juventud Deportiva Somorrostro
- Founded: 1943
- Ground: El Malecón, Muskiz, Basque Country, Spain
- Capacity: 364
- President: Alfonso del Barrio
- Manager: Borja Gómez
- League: División de Honor
- 2024–25: División de Honor, 8th of 18
| Home colours | Away colours |

Juventud Deportiva Somorrostro is a Spanish football team based in Muskiz, Biscay, in the autonomous community of Basque Country. Founded in 1943, they play in División de Honor, holding home matches at Estadio El Malecón, with a 364-seat capacity.

== History ==
Founded in 1943, Somorrostro played in the regional leagues until 2017, when the club achieved a first-ever promotion to Tercera División.

== Season to season ==
| Season | Tier | Division | Place | Copa del Rey |
|---|---|---|---|---|
| 1946–47 | 5 | 2ª Reg. | 5th | |
| 1947–48 | 5 | 2ª Reg. | 4th | |
| 1948–49 | 5 | 2ª Reg. | 8th | |
| 1949–50 | 6 | 3ª Reg. | 1st | |
| 1950–51 | 6 | 3ª Reg. | 4th | |
| 1951–52 | 6 | 3ª Reg. | 3rd | |
| 1952–53 | 6 | 3ª Reg. | 2nd | |
| 1953–54 | 5 | 2ª Reg. | 7th | |
| 1954–55 | 5 | 2ª Reg. | 7th | |
| 1955–56 | 5 | 2ª Reg. | 11th | |
| 1956–57 | 5 | 2ª Reg. | 2nd | |
| 1957–58 | 4 | 1ª Reg. | 4th | |
| 1958–59 | 4 | 1ª Reg. | 17th | |
| 1959–60 | 5 | 2ª Reg. | 7th | |
| 1960–61 | 5 | 2ª Reg. | 3rd | |
| 1961–62 | 5 | 2ª Reg. | 1st | |
| 1962–63 | 4 | 1ª Reg. | 5th | |
| 1963–64 | 4 | 1ª Reg. | 6th | |
| 1964–65 | 4 | 1ª Reg. | 16th | |
| 1965–66 | 5 | 2ª Reg. | 1st | |

| Season | Tier | Division | Place | Copa del Rey |
|---|---|---|---|---|
| 1966–67 | 4 | 1ª Reg. | 9th | |
| 1967–68 | 4 | 1ª Reg. | 9th | |
| 1968–69 | 4 | Reg. Pref. | 10th | |
| 1969–70 | 4 | Reg. Pref. | 10th | |
| 1970–71 | 4 | Reg. Pref. | 12th | |
| 1971–72 | 4 | Reg. Pref. | 11th | |
| 1972–73 | 4 | Reg. Pref. | 16th | |
| 1973–74 | 4 | Reg. Pref. | 15th | |
| 1974–75 | 4 | Reg. Pref. | 11th | |
| 1975–76 | 4 | Reg. Pref. | 7th | |
| 1976–77 | 4 | Reg. Pref. | 19th | |
| 1977–78 | 6 | 1ª Reg. | 2nd | |
| 1978–79 | 5 | Reg. Pref. | 15th | |
| 1979–80 | 5 | Reg. Pref. | 18th | |
| 1980–81 | 5 | Reg. Pref. | 20th | |
| 1981–82 | 6 | 1ª Reg. | 13th | |
| 1982–83 | 6 | 1ª Reg. | 4th | |
| 1983–84 | 6 | 1ª Reg. | 6th | |
| 1984–85 | 6 | 1ª Reg. | 4th | |
| 1985–86 | 6 | 1ª Reg. | 1st | |

| Season | Tier | Division | Place | Copa del Rey |
|---|---|---|---|---|
| 1986–87 | 5 | Reg. Pref. | 13th | |
| 1987–88 | 5 | Reg. Pref. | 17th | |
| 1988–89 | 6 | 1ª Reg. | 13th | |
| 1989–90 | 6 | 1ª Reg. | 11th | |
| 1990–91 | 6 | 1ª Terr. | 3rd | |
| 1991–92 | 6 | 1ª Terr. | 6th | |
| 1992–93 | 6 | 1ª Terr. | 4th | |
| 1993–94 | 6 | 1ª Terr. | 2nd | |
| 1994–95 | 5 | Terr. Pref. | 14th | |
| 1995–96 | 5 | Terr. Pref. | 15th | |
| 1996–97 | 5 | Terr. Pref. | 16th | |
| 1997–98 | 5 | Terr. Pref. | 17th | |
| 1998–99 | 6 | 1ª Terr. | 8th | |
| 1999–2000 | 6 | 1ª Terr. | 5th | |
| 2000–01 | 6 | 1ª Terr. | 1st | |
| 2001–02 | 5 | Terr. Pref. | 8th | |
| 2002–03 | 5 | Div. Hon. | 2nd | |
| 2003–04 | 5 | Div. Hon. | 3rd | |
| 2004–05 | 5 | Div. Hon. | 14th | |
| 2005–06 | 5 | Div. Hon. | 3rd | |

| Season | Tier | Division | Place | Copa del Rey |
|---|---|---|---|---|
| 2006–07 | 5 | Div. Hon. | 13th | |
| 2007–08 | 5 | Div. Hon. | 8th | |
| 2008–09 | 5 | Div. Hon. | 6th | |
| 2009–10 | 5 | Div. Hon. | 6th | |
| 2010–11 | 5 | Div. Hon. | 2nd | |
| 2011–12 | 5 | Div. Hon. | 3rd | |
| 2012–13 | 5 | Div. Hon. | 6th | |
| 2013–14 | 5 | Div. Hon. | 3rd | |
| 2014–15 | 5 | Div. Hon. | 3rd | |
| 2015–16 | 5 | Div. Hon. | 7th | |
| 2016–17 | 5 | Div. Hon. | 1st | |
| 2017–18 | 4 | 3ª | 7th | |
| 2018–19 | 4 | 3ª | 8th | |
| 2019–20 | 4 | 3ª | 5th | |
| 2020–21 | 4 | 3ª | 10th / 7th | |
| 2021–22 | 6 | Div. Hon. | 10th | |
| 2022–23 | 6 | Div. Hon. | 3rd | |
| 2023–24 | 6 | Div. Hon. | 13th | |
| 2024–25 | 6 | Div. Hon. | 8th | |
| 2025–26 | 6 | Div. Hon. | | |

- 4 seasons in Tercera División
