= SD Salvatierra =

Salvatierra
- Full name: Sociedad Deportiva Salvatierra
- Founded: 1964
- Ground: Municipal, Salvatierra/Agurain, Basque Country, Spain
- Capacity: 900
- Chairman: Rafael Erro
- Manager: Jonathan Marrero
- League: División de Honor
- 2024–25: Regional Preferente – Group 2, 3rd of 10 (promoted)
Home colours	Away colours

Sociedad Deportiva Salvatierra is a football team based in Salvatierra/Agurain, Álava in the autonomous community of Basque Country. Founded in 1964, it plays in División de Honor. The club's stadium is Estadio Municipal de Salvatierra with a capacity of 1,000 seats.

It is a partner club of the local professional team Deportivo Alavés.

== Season to season ==
Season	Tier	Division	Place	Copa del Rey
1970–71	5	2ª Reg.	7th	
1971–72	5	2ª Reg.	9th	
1972–73	5	2ª Reg.	10th	
1973–74	5	2ª Reg.	15th	
1974–75	5	1ª Reg.	13th	
1975–76	5	1ª Reg.	15th	
1976–77	6	2ª Reg.	3rd	
1977–78	7	2ª Reg.	1st	
1978–79	6	1ª Reg.	20th	
1979–80	7	2ª Reg.	7th	
1980–81	6	1ª Reg.	4th	
1981–82	6	1ª Reg.	6th	
1982–83	6	1ª Reg.	6th	
1983–84	6	1ª Reg.	5th	
1984–85	6	1ª Reg.	9th	
1985–86	6	1ª Reg.	7th	
1986–87	6	1ª Reg.	6th	
1987–88	6	1ª Reg.	4th	
1988–89	5	Reg. Pref.	9th	
1989–90	6	1ª Reg.	6th	

Season	Tier	Division	Place	Copa del Rey
1990–91	6	1ª Reg.	2nd	
1991–92	5	Reg. Pref.	15th	
1992–93	5	Reg. Pref.	16th	
1993–94	5	Reg. Pref.	8th	
1994–95	5	Reg. Pref.	11th	
1995–96	5	Reg. Pref.	4th	
1996–97	5	Reg. Pref.	7th	
1997–98	5	Reg. Pref.	6th	
1998–99	5	Reg. Pref.	9th	
1999–2000	5	Reg. Pref.	2nd	
2000–01	5	Reg. Pref.	4th	
2001–02	5	Reg. Pref.	3rd	
2002–03	5	Reg. Pref.	6th	
2003–04	5	Reg. Pref.	5th	
2004–05	5	Reg. Pref.	1st	
2005–06	4	3ª	20th	
2006–07	5	Reg. Pref.	4th	
2007–08	5	Reg. Pref.	11th	
2008–09	5	Reg. Pref.	1st	
2009–10	4	3ª	20th	

Season	Tier	Division	Place	Copa del Rey
2010–11	5	Reg. Pref.	3rd	
2011–12	5	Reg. Pref.	3rd	
2012–13	5	Reg. Pref.	2nd	
2013–14	5	Reg. Pref.	3rd	
2014–15	5	Reg. Pref.	5th	
2015–16	5	Reg. Pref.	5th	
2016–17	5	Reg. Pref.	4th	
2017–18	5	Reg. Pref.	12th	
2018–19	5	Reg. Pref.	2nd	
2019–20	5	Reg. Pref.	12th	
2020–21	5	Reg. Pref.	4th	
2021–22	6	Reg. Pref.	6th	
2022–23	6	Div. Hon.	16th	
2023–24	7	Reg. Pref.	5th	
2024–25	7	Reg. Pref.	3rd	
2025–26	6	Div. Hon.		

- 2 seasons in Tercera División
