= 1981–82 Tercera División =

Tercera División
- Season: 1981–82

The 1981–82 Tercera División season is the 5th season since establishment the tier four.

== League tables ==
=== Group I ===
Pos	Team	Pld	W	D	L	GF	GA	GD	Pts
1	Pontevedra	38	25	10	3	78	25	+53	60
2	Ourense	38	23	10	5	70	24	+46	56
3	Lugo	38	23	9	6	72	30	+42	55
4	Arosa	38	16	14	8	46	33	+13	46
5	Gran Peña	38	14	17	7	51	40	+11	45
6	Turista	38	15	15	8	42	33	+9	45
7	Viveiro	38	16	11	11	57	35	+22	43
8	Vista Alegre	38	16	8	14	40	44	−4	40
9	Flavia	38	12	15	11	35	39	−4	39
10	Alondras	38	14	9	15	48	51	−3	37
11	Fabril Deportivo	38	10	16	12	47	50	−3	36
12	Lalín	38	12	9	17	35	45	−10	33
13	San Martín	38	12	8	18	37	54	−17	32
14	Arenteiro	38	11	10	17	41	50	−9	32
15	Lemos	38	10	12	16	40	34	+6	32
16	Atlético Riveira	38	7	18	13	34	53	−19	32
17	Porriño Industrial	38	8	14	16	42	48	−6	30
18	Juventud de Cambados	38	11	7	20	49	66	−17	29
19	Finisterre	38	7	8	23	29	93	−64	22
20	Verín	38	4	8	26	19	66	−47	16

=== Group II ===
Pos	Team	Pld	W	D	L	GF	GA	GD	Pts
1	Langreo	38	22	9	7	83	37	+46	53
2	Siero	38	20	9	9	72	37	+35	49
3	Santoña	38	17	12	9	48	26	+22	46
4	Cayón	38	18	7	13	63	41	+22	43
5	Europa de Nava	38	16	10	12	43	46	−3	42
6	Titánico	38	18	5	15	45	46	−1	41
7	Castro	38	16	9	13	46	43	+3	41
8	Real Avilés	38	16	9	13	46	39	+7	41
9	Real Oviedo Aficionado	38	16	8	14	44	47	−3	40
10	Turón	38	14	11	13	51	53	−2	39
11	Naval	38	16	7	15	47	50	−3	39
12	Caudal	38	15	9	14	49	42	+7	39
13	Deportiva Piloñesa	38	12	14	12	51	50	+1	38
14	Gimnástica de Torrelavega	38	16	4	18	49	54	−5	36
15	San Martín	38	15	6	17	48	62	−14	36
16	Unión Club	38	14	7	17	43	53	−10	35
17	Atlético de Lugones	38	12	10	16	53	56	−3	34
18	Buelna	38	11	9	18	41	61	−20	31
19	Gijón Industrial	38	5	11	22	33	67	−34	21
20	Barreda	38	4	8	26	21	67	−46	16

=== Group III ===
Pos	Team	Pld	W	D	L	GF	GA	GD	Pts
1	Eibar	38	20	11	7	56	25	+31	51
2	Aurrerá de Ondarroa	38	20	11	7	56	30	+26	51
3	Baskonia	38	19	10	9	62	36	+26	48
4	Deusto	38	19	9	10	58	43	+15	47
5	Amorebieta	38	17	12	9	56	41	+15	46
6	Real Unión	38	18	7	13	60	42	+18	43
7	Lemona	38	15	8	15	49	47	+2	38
8	Alavés Aficionados	38	15	7	16	50	55	−5	37
9	Gernika	38	17	3	18	44	44	0	37
10	Lagun Onak	38	15	7	16	54	69	−15	37
11	Santutxu	38	11	13	14	33	35	−2	35
12	Anaitasuna	38	13	9	16	43	54	−11	35
13	Zorrotza	38	10	15	13	35	44	−9	35
14	Bergara	38	13	8	17	33	39	−6	34
15	Touring	38	11	11	16	39	53	−14	33
16	Tolosa	38	11	11	16	41	49	−8	33
17	Getxo	38	14	4	20	50	61	−11	32
18	Arenas de Getxo	38	9	13	16	47	59	−12	31
19	Balmaseda	38	10	9	19	39	61	−22	29
20	Mungia	38	12	4	22	42	60	−18	28

=== Group IV ===
Pos	Team	Pld	W	D	L	GF	GA	GD	Pts
1	Binéfar	38	24	4	10	82	37	+45	52
2	Osasuna Promesas	38	21	9	8	79	46	+33	51
3	Deportivo Aragón	38	19	11	8	65	36	+29	49
4	Numancia	38	18	11	9	68	44	+24	47
5	Tudelano	38	18	10	10	62	47	+15	46
6	Corellano	38	21	4	13	70	59	+11	46
7	Peña Sport	38	16	13	9	61	40	+21	45
8	Utrillas	38	16	13	9	40	31	+9	45
9	Sangüesa	38	15	8	15	72	62	+10	38
10	Arnedo	38	15	6	17	42	52	−10	36
11	Calahorra	38	14	8	16	58	59	−1	36
12	Atlético Monzón	38	10	14	14	57	66	−9	34
13	Sabiñánigo	38	11	11	16	43	45	−2	33
14	Tauste	38	8	17	13	40	54	−14	33
15	Tarazona	38	11	10	17	44	61	−17	32
16	Alsasua	38	10	12	16	46	56	−10	32
17	Alfaro	38	11	7	20	41	71	−30	29
18	Burladés	38	10	9	19	29	56	−27	29
19	Ejea	38	9	6	23	43	76	−33	24
20	Chantrea	38	6	11	21	42	86	−44	23

=== Group V ===
Pos	Team	Pld	W	D	L	GF	GA	GD	Pts
1	L'Hospitalet	38	21	12	5	66	30	+36	54
2	Badalona	38	24	5	9	67	35	+32	53
3	Figueres	38	20	7	11	67	43	+24	47
4	FC Barcelona Aficionados	38	17	12	9	76	46	+30	46
5	Júpiter	38	20	5	13	71	44	+27	45
6	Igualada	38	18	7	13	52	48	+4	43
7	Vilafranca	38	19	4	15	60	51	+9	42
8	Olot	38	15	11	12	46	38	+8	41
9	Sant Andreu	38	18	5	15	67	54	+13	41
10	Vic	38	15	9	14	49	59	−10	39
11	La Cava	38	14	10	14	47	43	+4	38
12	Lloret	38	12	12	14	45	52	−7	36
13	Europa	38	14	8	16	51	50	+1	36
14	Canovelles	38	15	6	17	49	48	+1	36
15	Mataró	38	11	11	16	41	64	−23	33
16	Santboià	38	10	9	19	50	55	−5	29
17	Horta	38	9	8	21	34	67	−33	26
18	Girona	38	9	8	21	42	69	−27	26
19	Malgrat	38	8	10	20	42	89	−47	26
20	Gavà	38	5	13	20	42	79	−37	23

=== Group VI ===
Pos	Team	Pld	W	D	L	GF	GA	GD	Pts
1	Alcoyano	38	21	12	5	60	25	+35	54
2	Catarroja	38	22	9	7	68	34	+34	53
3	Mestalla	38	20	9	9	67	35	+32	49
4	Alicante	38	18	11	9	46	31	+15	47
5	Ontinyent	38	16	14	8	58	40	+18	46
6	Gandía	38	19	8	11	57	34	+23	46
7	Villarreal	38	16	11	11	55	44	+11	43
8	Vinaròs	38	15	12	11	63	47	+16	42
9	Benicarló	38	15	9	14	50	57	−7	39
10	Dénia	38	15	8	15	52	54	−2	38
11	Aspense	38	12	12	14	54	56	−2	36
12	Carcaixent	38	13	10	15	35	48	−13	36
13	Paterna	38	12	10	16	45	63	−18	34
14	Novelda	38	11	12	15	42	45	−3	34
15	Alginet	38	13	6	19	38	59	−21	32
16	Puçol	38	9	13	16	35	52	−17	31
17	Alzira	38	9	12	17	27	38	−11	30
18	Olímpic de Xàtiva	38	11	8	19	41	57	−16	30
19	Español de San Vicente	38	10	8	20	44	71	−27	28
20	Quart de Poblet	38	2	8	28	29	86	−57	12

=== Group VII ===
Pos	Team	Pld	W	D	L	GF	GA	GD	Pts
1	Parla	38	19	12	7	51	34	+17	50
2	Talavera	38	20	10	8	57	39	+18	50
3	Manchego	38	16	14	8	59	41	+18	46
4	Valdepeñas	38	18	9	11	68	41	+27	45
5	Pegaso	38	15	12	11	63	45	+18	42
6	Leganés	38	18	6	14	64	39	+25	42
7	Real Madrid Aficionados	38	15	11	12	59	37	+22	41
8	Real Ávila	38	13	14	11	63	40	+23	40
9	Alcorcón	38	14	12	12	61	55	+6	40
10	Carabanchel	38	14	11	13	47	55	−8	39
11	Ciempozuelos	38	14	9	15	47	41	+6	37
12	Real Aranjuez	38	11	15	12	42	53	−11	37
13	Daimiel	38	10	16	12	34	45	−11	36
14	San Fernando de Henares	38	9	15	14	44	59	−15	33
15	Colonia Moscardó	38	12	9	17	34	49	−15	33
16	Conquense	38	9	14	15	35	43	−8	32
17	Atlético de Pinto	38	11	10	17	40	59	−19	32
18	Alcobendas	38	12	7	19	42	72	−30	31
19	Móstoles	38	9	13	16	33	55	−22	31
20	Guadalajara	38	5	13	20	33	74	−41	23

=== Group VIII ===
Pos	Team	Pld	W	D	L	GF	GA	GD	Pts
1	Real Valladolid Promesas	38	23	11	4	90	27	+63	57
2	Salmantino	38	21	11	6	64	21	+43	53
3	Atlético Bembibre	38	21	8	9	69	39	+30	50
4	Toresana	38	22	6	10	66	29	+37	50
5	Ponferradina	38	18	7	13	83	44	+39	43
6	Arandina	38	16	11	11	58	47	+11	43
7	Toreno	38	16	7	15	63	61	+2	39
8	Laguna	38	15	8	15	52	59	−7	38
9	Gimnástica Medinense	38	14	8	16	46	48	−2	36
10	Cultural Leonesa Promesas (Note: Due to Cultural Leonesa relegation from Segunda División B to this group, the reserve team, Cultural Leonesa Promesas, was relegated)	38	12	11	15	50	60	−10	35
11	Cacabelense	38	14	7	17	49	55	−6	35
12	Atlético Astorga	38	14	6	18	54	61	−7	34
13	Venta de Baños	38	13	8	17	41	60	−19	34
14	Guardo	38	11	12	15	56	59	−3	34
15	Fabero	38	12	9	17	47	59	−12	33
16	Benavente	38	11	11	16	40	53	−13	33
17	Salas	38	13	6	19	54	64	−10	32
18	Béjar Industrial	38	12	7	19	41	74	−33	31
19	Ejido	38	8	14	16	40	70	−30	30
20	Ciudad Rodrigo	38	9	2	27	39	112	−73	20

=== Group IX ===
Pos	Team	Pld	W	D	L	GF	GA	GD	Pts
1	Fuengirola	38	21	8	9	71	37	+34	50
2	Martos	38	23	3	12	83	50	+33	49
3	Juventud de Torremolinos	38	19	9	10	54	44	+10	47
4	Atlético Malagueño	38	20	6	12	62	49	+13	46
5	Alhaurino	38	18	9	11	73	54	+19	45
6	Atlético Benamiel	38	16	11	11	48	43	+5	43
7	Baza	38	16	9	13	47	47	0	41
8	Melilla	38	15	8	15	57	49	+8	38
9	Atlético Marbella	38	15	8	15	46	46	0	38
10	Recreativo de Bailén	38	13	12	13	45	49	−4	38
11	San Pedro	38	14	9	15	56	47	+9	37
12	Estepona	38	15	7	16	51	46	+5	37
13	Vélez	38	14	9	15	45	46	−1	37
14	Úbeda	38	12	10	16	53	62	−9	34
15	Motril	38	11	12	15	34	47	−13	34
16	Carolinense	38	13	7	18	48	64	−16	33
17	Iliturgi	38	8	16	14	29	37	−8	32
18	Ronda	38	11	9	18	46	65	−19	31
19	Atarfe Industrial	38	11	8	19	43	65	−22	30
20	Recreativo de Granada	38	6	8	24	26	70	−44	20

=== Group X ===
Pos	Team	Pld	W	D	L	GF	GA	GD	Pts
1	Cacereño	38	24	7	7	71	29	+42	55
2	Mérida Industrial	38	21	13	4	56	26	+30	55
3	Sevilla Atlético	38	23	8	7	86	40	+46	54
4	Díter Zafra	38	18	12	8	46	36	+10	48
5	Coria	38	16	14	8	57	45	+12	46
6	Jerez Industrial	38	19	7	12	62	42	+20	45
7	Plasencia	38	18	6	14	47	43	+4	42
8	Betis Deportivo	38	13	13	12	38	33	+5	39
9	Puerto Real	38	13	12	13	49	48	+1	38
10	Balompédica Linense	38	12	14	12	37	37	0	38
11	Don Benito	38	14	9	15	59	60	−1	37
12	Atlético Sanluqueño	38	11	12	15	35	44	−9	34
13	Extremadura	38	12	9	17	45	57	−12	33
14	Rota	38	8	16	14	38	49	−11	32
15	Moralo	38	10	12	16	35	55	−20	32
16	Pozoblanco	38	11	7	20	46	53	−7	29
17	Alcalá	38	11	6	21	32	52	−20	28
18	Villanovense	38	9	10	19	47	61	−14	28
19	La Estrella	38	6	14	18	32	60	−28	26
20	Imperio de Ceuta	38	5	11	22	31	79	−48	21

=== Group XI ===
Pos	Team	Pld	W	D	L	GF	GA	GD	Pts
1	Poblense	38	26	10	2	88	18	+70	62
2	Constància	38	23	8	7	59	23	+36	54
3	Manacor	38	21	5	12	66	47	+19	47
4	Sporting Mahonés	38	20	4	14	65	49	+16	44
5	Porreres	38	18	7	13	65	51	+14	43
6	Atlètic de Ciutadella	38	16	10	12	66	49	+17	42
7	Portmany	38	19	4	15	83	50	+33	42
8	Felanitx	38	17	5	16	53	62	−9	39
9	Murense	38	14	10	14	42	45	−3	38
10	Porto Cristo	38	14	10	14	55	51	+4	38
11	Binissalem	38	13	9	16	37	53	−16	35
12	Collerense	38	12	11	15	48	60	−12	35
13	Ses Salines	38	14	6	18	45	69	−24	34
14	Alaior	38	10	13	15	35	49	−14	33
15	Xilvar	38	10	12	16	40	60	−20	32
16	Andratx	38	12	8	18	39	71	−32	32
17	Margaritense	38	11	9	18	49	54	−5	31
18	Calvià	38	13	4	21	54	76	−22	30
19	Santanyí	38	8	10	20	37	60	−23	26
20	Sóller	38	7	9	22	35	64	−29	23

=== Group XII ===
Pos	Team	Pld	W	D	L	GF	GA	GD	Pts
1	Telde	38	24	10	4	80	35	+45	58
2	Güímar	38	27	4	7	61	26	+35	58
3	Realejos	38	20	8	10	64	48	+16	48
4	Tenisca	38	16	15	7	81	47	+34	47
5	San Andrés	38	19	4	15	69	44	+25	42
6	Orotava	38	16	10	12	59	44	+15	42
7	Marino	38	15	11	12	51	44	+7	41
8	Real Artesano	38	15	7	16	57	60	−3	37
9	Real Unión de Tenerife	38	12	12	14	65	63	+2	36
10	Lanzarote	38	15	5	18	49	49	0	35
11	CD Estrella	38	13	9	16	56	63	−7	35
12	Tenerife Aficionado	38	11	12	15	57	56	+1	34
13	Unión Tejina	38	15	4	19	54	64	−10	34
14	Puerto de la Cruz	38	14	6	18	59	73	−14	34
15	Sporting San José	38	13	8	17	54	60	−6	34
16	Tamaraceite	38	11	12	15	43	65	−22	34
17	Mensajero	38	15	3	20	44	49	−5	33
18	Estrella CF	38	14	5	19	52	64	−12	33
19	Unión Moral	38	12	8	18	42	58	−16	32
20	Toscal	38	3	7	28	31	116	−85	13

=== Group XIII ===
Pos	Team	Pld	W	D	L	GF	GA	GD	Pts
1	Albacete	38	27	7	4	79	19	+60	61
2	Orihuela	38	23	10	5	71	18	+53	56
3	Torrevieja	38	19	11	8	61	36	+25	49
4	Eldense	38	19	10	9	48	33	+15	48
5	Cieza	38	19	10	9	56	34	+22	48
6	Torre Pacheco	38	17	10	11	44	47	−3	44
7	Caravaca	38	15	13	10	54	32	+22	43
8	Molinense	38	13	15	10	49	41	+8	41
9	Villarrobledo	38	15	9	14	51	53	−2	39
10	Pinatar	38	14	11	13	43	32	+11	39
11	Yeclano	38	13	12	13	54	48	+6	38
12	Olímpico Juvenil	38	14	8	16	53	45	+8	36
13	Horadada	38	13	10	15	41	49	−8	36
14	Águilas	38	13	7	18	46	59	−13	33
15	Ilicitano	38	12	8	18	49	65	−16	32
16	Imperial	38	12	5	21	53	74	−21	29
17	Atlético Muleño	38	11	6	21	47	68	−21	28
18	Jumilla	38	11	4	23	40	61	−21	26
19	Almoradí	38	7	4	27	30	90	−60	18
20	Callosa	38	3	10	25	23	88	−65	16

== Promotion playoff ==
=== First round ===
Team 1	Agg.	Team 2	1st leg	2nd leg
Cacereño	4–3	Badalona	4–2	0–1
Eibar	0–3	Catarroja	0–2	0–1
Real Valladolid Promesas	0–5	Talavera	0–2	0–3
Fuengirola	1–3	Ourense	1–1	0–2
Parla	1–0	Mérida Industrial	1–0	0–0
L'Hospitalet	4–0	Güímar	4–0	0–0
Osasuna Promesas	3–2	Telde	3–0	0–2
Alcoyano	2–4	Orihuela	2–2	0–2
Pontevedra	2–0	Constància	2–0	0–0
Salmantino	1–4	Binéfar	1–0	0–4
Poblense	4–2	Langreo	3–1	1–1
Albacete	6–2	Aurrerá de Ondarroa	2–0	4–2

=== Final Round ===
Team 1	Agg.	Team 2	1st leg	2nd leg
Talavera	3–6	Albacete	2–1	1–5
Ourense	2–6	Binéfar	1–3	1–3
Parla	5–3	Orihuela	3–1	2–2
Catarroja	1–4	Poblense	1–2	0–2
Cacereño	3–5	Osasuna Promesas	3–1	0–4
L'Hospitalet	3–2	Pontevedra	2–0	1–2

== Season records ==
- Most wins: 27, Güímar and Albacete.
- Most draws: 18, Atlético Riveira.
- Most losses: 28, Quart de Poblet and Toscal.
- Most goals for: 90, Real Valladolid Promesas.
- Most goals against: 116, Toscal.
- Most points: 62, Poblense.
- Fewest wins: 2, Quart de Poblet.
- Fewest draws: 2, Ciudad Rodrigo.
- Fewest losses: 2, Poblense.
- Fewest goals for: 19, Verín.
- Fewest goals against: 18, Poblense and Orihuela.
- Fewest points: 12, Quart de Poblet.
