= CD Elgoibar =

Spanish football club

Coordinates: 43.20892°N 2.41127°W

Elgoibar
- Full name: Club Deportivo Elgoibar
- Nickname: Haundi
- Founded: 1917; 109 years ago
- Stadium: Estadio Mintxeta
- Capacity: 4,000
- President: Eduardo Arrieta
- Head coach: Omar Aizpuru
- League: División de Honor
- 2025–26: División de Honor, 7th of 18
Home colours	Away colours

Club Deportivo Elgoibar is a football team based in Elgoibar in the autonomous community of Basque Country. Founded in 1917, it plays in the División de Honor. The club played their home games at Estadio Mintxeta with a capacity of 4,000 seats.

== Season to season ==
Season	Tier	Division	Place	Copa del Rey
1944–45	5	2ª Reg.	3rd	
1945–46	4	1ª Reg.	1st	
1946–47	4	1ª Reg.	1st	
1947–48	4	1ª Reg.	1st	
1948–49	4	1ª Reg.	1st	
1949–50	4	1ª Reg.	7th	
1950–51	4	1ª Reg.	2nd	
1951–52	4	1ª Reg.	1st	
1952–53	4	1ª Reg.	2nd	
1953–54	4	1ª Reg.	1st	
1954–55	3	3ª	2nd	
1955–56	3	3ª	1st	
1956–57	3	3ª	1st	
1957–58	3	3ª	10th	
1958–59	3	3ª	13th	
1959–60	3	3ª	5th	
1960–61	3	3ª	12th	
1961–62	3	3ª	17th	
1962–63	4	1ª Reg.	6th	
1963–64	4	1ª Reg.	12th	

Season	Tier	Division	Place	Copa del Rey
1964–65	4	1ª Reg.	5th	
1965–66	4	1ª Reg.	8th	
1966–67	4	1ª Reg.	1st	
1967–68	3	3ª	13th	
1968–69	4	1ª Reg.	11th	
1969–70	4	1ª Reg.	4th	
1970–71	4	1ª Reg.	10th	
1971–72	4	1ª Reg.	12th	
1972–73	4	1ª Reg.	10th	
1973–74	4	1ª Reg.	5th	
1974–75	4	Reg. Pref.	11th	
1975–76	4	Reg. Pref.	13th	
1976–77	4	Reg. Pref.	17th	
1977–78	5	Reg. Pref.	18th	
1978–79	5	Reg. Pref.	10th	
1979–80	5	Reg. Pref.	13th	
1980–81	5	Reg. Pref.	5th	
1981–82	5	Reg. Pref.	4th	
1982–83	5	Reg. Pref.	6th	
1983–84	5	Reg. Pref.	4th	

Season	Tier	Division	Place	Copa del Rey
1984–85	5	Reg. Pref.	1st	
1985–86	4	3ª	18th	
1986–87	5	Reg. Pref.	5th	
1987–88	5	Reg. Pref.	7th	
1988–89	5	Reg. Pref.	1st	
1989–90	4	3ª	6th	
1990–91	4	3ª	2nd	First round
1991–92	4	3ª	3rd	
1992–93	3	2ª B	19th	
1993–94	4	3ª	5th	Withdrew
1994–95	4	3ª	8th	
1995–96	4	3ª	4th	
1996–97	4	3ª	2nd	
1997–98	3	2ª B	8th	
1998–99	3	2ª B	20th	
1999–2000	4	3ª	18th	
2000–01	5	Reg. Pref.	8th	
2001–02	5	Reg. Pref.	3rd	
2002–03	5	Reg. Pref.	4th	
2003–04	5	Reg. Pref.	1st	

Season	Tier	Division	Place	Copa del Rey
2004–05	4	3ª	14th	
2005–06	4	3ª	11th	
2006–07	4	3ª	12th	
2007–08	4	3ª	12th	
2008–09	4	3ª	3rd	
2009–10	4	3ª	4th	
2010–11	4	3ª	17th	
2011–12	4	3ª	12th	
2012–13	4	3ª	15th	
2013–14	4	3ª	18th	
2014–15	5	Div. Hon.	8th	
2015–16	5	Div. Hon.	11th	
2016–17	5	Div. Hon.	15th	
2017–18	6	Pref.	3rd	
2018–19	5	Div. Hon.	10th	
2019–20	5	Div. Hon.	9th	
2020–21	5	Div. Hon.	3rd	
2021–22	6	Div. Hon.	3rd	
2022–23	6	Div. Hon.	5th	
2023–24	6	Div. Hon.	7th	

Season	Tier	Division	Place	Copa del Rey
2024–25	6	Div. Hon.	13th	
2025–26	6	Div. Hon.		

- 3 seasons in Segunda División B
- 28 seasons in Tercera División

== Famous players ==
- (Spain) José Araquistáin
- (Spain) Juan Cruz Sol
- (Spain) Joseba Etxeberria
