= Apurtuarte Club =

Spanish football club

Apurtuarte
- Full name: Apurtuarte Club
- Founded: 1926
- Ground: Arteaga, Erandio, Vizcaya, Spain
- Chairman: (Spain) Juan Ignacio Bilbao
- Manager: (Spain) Asier Petralanda
- League: Preferente
- 2025–26: Preferente, 11th of 18
Home colours	Away colours

Apurtuarte Club is a Spanish football team based in Erandio in the autonomous community of Vizcaya. Founded in 1926, the team plays in Preferente. The club's home ground is Campo de Fútbol Arteaga.

== Season to season ==
Season	Tier	Division	Place	Copa del Rey
1943–44	5	2ª Reg.	3rd	
1944–45	5	2ª Reg.	2nd	
1945–46	4	1ª Reg.	2nd	
1946–47	4	1ª Reg.	6th	
1947–48	4	1ª Reg.	3rd	
1948–49	4	1ª Reg.	2nd	
1949–50	4	1ª Reg.	6th	
1950–51	4	1ª Reg.	10th	
1951–52	4	1ª Reg.	12th	
1952–53	5	2ª Reg.	3rd	
1953–54	5	2ª Reg.	1st	
1954–55	4	1ª Reg.	6th	
1955–56	4	1ª Reg.	7th	
1956–57	4	1ª Reg.	2nd	
1957–58	3	3ª	8th	
1958–59	3	3ª	5th	
1959–60	3	3ª	16th	
1960–61	DNP			
1961–62	DNP			
1962–63	5	2ª Reg.	7th	

Season	Tier	Division	Place	Copa del Rey
1963–64	5	2ª Reg.	9th	
1964–65	5	2ª Reg.	11th	
1965–66	5	2ª Reg.	10th	
1966–67	5	2ª Reg.	15th	
1967–68	5	2ª Reg.	4th	
1968–69	5	1ª Reg.	13th	
1969–70	5	1ª Reg.	16th	
1970–71	6	2ª Reg.	15th	
1971–72	6	2ª Reg.	1st	
1972–73	5	1ª Reg.	13th	
1973–74	5	1ª Reg.	5th	
1974–75	5	1ª Reg.	15th	
1975–76	5	1ª Reg.	2nd	
1976–77	4	Reg. Pref.	12th	
1977–78	5	Reg. Pref.	18th	
1978–79	6	1ª Reg.	8th	
1979–80	6	1ª Reg.	14th	
1980–81	6	1ª Reg.	13th	
1981–82	6	1ª Reg.	12th	
1982–83	6	1ª Reg.	17th	

Season	Tier	Division	Place	Copa del Rey
1983–84	7	2ª Reg.	2nd	
1984–85	6	1ª Reg.	18th	
1985–86	7	2ª Reg.	1st	
1986–87	6	1ª Reg.	16th	
1987–88	6	1ª Reg.	13th	
1988–89	6	1ª Reg.	17th	
1989–90	6	1ª Reg.	13th	
1990–91	6	1ª Terr.	13th	
1991–92	6	1ª Terr.	14th	
1992–93	6	1ª Terr.	6th	
1993–94	6	1ª Terr.	8th	
1994–95	6	1ª Terr.	3rd	
1995–96	6	1ª Terr.	2nd	
1996–97	5	Terr. Pref.	19th	
1997–98	6	1ª Terr.	15th	
1998–99	6	1ª Terr.	14th	
1999–2000	6	1ª Terr.	13th	
2000–01	6	1ª Terr.	20th	
2001–02	7	2ª Terr.	2nd	
2002–03	7	1ª Div.	8th	

Season	Tier	Division	Place	Copa del Rey
2003–04	7	1ª Div.	3rd	
2004–05	7	1ª Div.	8th	
2005–06	7	1ª Div.	3rd	
2006–07	7	1ª Div.	1st	
2007–08	6	Pref.	1st	
2008–09	5	Div. Hon.	5th	
2009–10	5	Div. Hon.	2nd	
2010–11	5	Div. Hon.	12th	
2011–12	5	Div. Hon.	6th	
2012–13	5	Div. Hon.	7th	
2013–14	5	Div. Hon.	6th	
2014–15	5	Div. Hon.	7th	
2015–16	5	Div. Hon.	5th	
2016–17	5	Div. Hon.	13th	
2017–18	5	Div. Hon.	15th	
2018–19	5	Div. Hon.	15th	
2019–20	6	Pref.	10th	
2020–21	DNP			
2021–22	7	Pref.	6th	
2022–23	7	Pref.	11th	

Season	Tier	Division	Place	Copa del Rey
2023–24	7	Pref.	17th	
2024–25	8	1ª Div.	1st	
2025–26	7	Pref.	11th	
2026–27	7	Pref.		

- 3 seasons in Tercera División

== Famous players ==
- Rafael Eguzkiza
