= Padura Club =

Association football club in Spain

Padura
- Full name: Padura Club
- Founded: 20 February 1920; 106 years ago
- Ground: Santo Cristo
- Capacity: 1,560
- President: Joseba Andoni Laiseka Zabala
- Manager: Toño Vadillo
- League: División de Honor
- 2025–26: División de Honor, 5th of 18
- Website: https://www.padura.org/
Home colours	Away colours

Padura Club (sometimes referred as Club Deportivo Padura) is a Spanish football club based in Arrigorriaga, Biscay, in the autonomous community of Basque Country. Founded in 1920, it plays in División de Honor, holding home games at Estadio Santo Cristo, with a capacity of 1,560 people.

== History ==
Founded in 1920, Padura was renamed to Arrigorriaga Club in 1939, only returning to its previous name in 1950. In 1955, the club achieved promotion to Tercera División for the first time ever, and remained in the category for three seasons.

Back to the regional leagues in 1958, Padura returned to a national division in May 2022, after winning their División de Honor group and achieving promotion to Tercera Federación.

== Season to season ==
Season	Tier	Division	Place	Copa del Rey
1928–29	5	2ª Reg. P.	5th	
1929–30	6	2ª Reg.	4th	
1930–31	6	2ª Reg.	5th	
1931–32	6	2ª Reg.	1st	
1932–33	5	2ª Reg. P.	3rd	
1933–34	5	2ª Reg. P.	8th	
1934–35	5	2ª Reg. P.	1st	
1935–36	4	1ª Reg.	3rd	
1939–40	5	1ª Reg. B	4th	
1940–41	4	1ª Reg. A	4th	
1941–42	3	1ª Reg. A	10th	
1942–43	4	1ª Reg. B	1st	
1943–44	4	1ª Reg.	1st	
1944–45	4	1ª Reg.	1st	
1945–46	4	1ª Reg.	1st	
1946–47	4	1ª Reg.	3rd	
1947–48	4	1ª Reg.	7th	
1948–49	4	1ª Reg.	7th	
1949–50	4	1ª Reg.	4th	
1950–51	4	1ª Reg.	4th	

Season	Tier	Division	Place	Copa del Rey
1951–52	4	1ª Reg.	3rd	
1952–53	4	1ª Reg.	6th	
1953–54	4	1ª Reg.	3rd	
1954–55	4	1ª Reg.	3rd	
1955–56	3	3ª	9th	
1956–57	3	3ª	12th	
1957–58	3	3ª	15th	
1958–59	4	1ª Reg.	15th	
1959–60	5	2ª Reg.	4th	
1960–61	5	2ª Reg.	4th	
1961–62	5	2ª Reg.	2nd	
1962–63	5	2ª Reg.	2nd	
1963–64	5	2ª Reg.	1st	
1964–65	4	1ª Reg.	7th	
1965–66	4	1ª Reg.	13th	
1966–67	5	2ª Reg.	4th	
1967–68	5	2ª Reg.	3rd	
1968–69	5	1ª Reg.	1st	
1969–70	4	Reg. Pref.	4th	
1970–71	4	Reg. Pref.	19th	

Season	Tier	Division	Place	Copa del Rey
1971–72	5	1ª Reg.	13th	
1972–73	5	1ª Reg.	17th	
1973–74	6	2ª Reg.	3rd	
1974–75	6	2ª Reg.	1st	
1975–76	5	1ª Reg.	11th	
1976–77	5	1ª Reg.	11th	
1977–78	6	1ª Reg.	9th	
1978–79	5	1ª Reg.	4th	
1979–80	5	Reg. Pref.	9th	
1980–81	5	Reg. Pref.	13th	
1981–82	5	Reg. Pref.	10th	
1982–83	5	Reg. Pref.	9th	
1983–84	5	Reg. Pref.	7th	
1984–85	5	Reg. Pref.	4th	
1985–86	5	Reg. Pref.	7th	
1986–87	5	Reg. Pref.	8th	
1987–88	5	Reg. Pref.	10th	
1988–89	5	Reg. Pref.	5th	
1989–90	5	Reg. Pref.	9th	
1990–91	5	Terr. Pref.	4th	

Season	Tier	Division	Place	Copa del Rey
1991–92	5	Terr. Pref.	5th	
1992–93	5	Terr. Pref.	10th	
1993–94	5	Terr. Pref.	6th	
1994–95	5	Terr. Pref.	3rd	
1995–96	5	Terr. Pref.	10th	
1996–97	5	Terr. Pref.	4th	
1997–98	5	Terr. Pref.	10th	
1998–99	5	Terr. Pref.	12th	
1999–2000	5	Terr. Pref.	6th	
2000–01	5	Terr. Pref.	5th	
2001–02	5	Terr. Pref.	13th	
2002–03	5	Div. Hon.	7th	
2003–04	5	Div. Hon.	17th	
2004–05	6	Pref.	3rd	
2005–06	5	Div. Hon.	12th	
2006–07	5	Div. Hon.	11th	
2007–08	5	Div. Hon.	16th	
2008–09	6	Pref.	13th	
2009–10	6	Pref.	7th	
2010–11	6	Pref.	11th	

Season	Tier	Division	Place	Copa del Rey
2011–12	6	Pref.	8th	
2012–13	6	Pref.	1st	
2013–14	5	Div. Hon.	8th	
2014–15	5	Div. Hon.	16th	
2015–16	5	Div. Hon.	2nd	
2016–17	5	Div. Hon.	6th	
2017–18	5	Div. Hon.	14th	
2018–19	5	Div. Hon.	13th	
2019–20	5	Div. Hon.	9th	
2020–21	5	Div. Hon.	12th	
2021–22	6	Div. Hon.	1st	
2022–23	5	3ª Fed.	13th	
2023–24	5	3ª Fed.	14th	
2024–25	5	3ª Fed.	17th	
2025–26	6	Div. Hon.		

- 3 seasons in Tercera División
- 3 seasons in Tercera Federación
