= CD Aurrerá Ondarroa =

Spanish football team

Coordinates: 43.31930°N 2.42805°W

Aurrerá Ondarroa
- Full name: Club Deportivo Aurrerá Ondarroa
- Founded: 1921
- Ground: Zaldupe, Ondarroa, Basque Country, Spain
- Capacity: 1,000
- President: Mikel Santiso
- Head coach: Josue Atela
- League: División de Honor
- 2025–26: División de Honor, 7th of 18
Home colours	Away colours

Club Deportivo Aurrerá Ondarroa (Ondarroako Aurrera Kirol Elkartea in Basque) is a Spanish football team based in Ondarroa, in the autonomous community of Basque Country. Founded in 1921, it plays in División de Honor, holding home matches at Zaldupe.

== Development fee ==
In February 2018, the club received a €600,000 windfall resulting from the transfer of their former youth player Iñigo Martínez who moved between the region's biggest clubs Real Sociedad and Athletic Bilbao. Although less than 10% of the €32 million fee (the standard youth development payment percentage) due to a prior agreement between Aurrerá and Real in the event of a big move involving the player, it represented three times their annual budget and allowed for significant improvements to be made to facilities.

== Season to season ==
Season	Tier	Division	Place	Copa del Rey
1945–46	4	1ª Reg.	11th	
1946–47	5	2ª Reg.	3rd	
1947–48	4	1ª Reg.	6th	
1948–49	4	1ª Reg.	8th	
1949–50	5	2ª Reg.	2nd	
1950–51	4	1ª Reg.	15th	
1951–52	4	1ª Reg.	7th	
1952–53	4	1ª Reg.	4th	
1953–54	4	1ª Reg.	12th	
1954–55	4	1ª Reg.	10th	
1955–56	4	1ª Reg.	9th	
1956–57	4	1ª Reg.	6th	
1957–58	4	1ª Reg.	5th	
1958–59	4	1ª Reg.	7th	
1959–60	4	1ª Reg.	6th	
1960–61	4	1ª Reg.	5th	
1961–62	4	1ª Reg.	10th	
1962–63	4	1ª Reg.	3rd	
1963–64	3	3ª	12th	
1964–65	3	3ª	14th	

Season	Tier	Division	Place	Copa del Rey
1965–66	4	1ª Reg.	1st	
1966–67	4	1ª Reg.	8th	
1967–68	4	1ª Reg.	7th	
1968–69	5	2ª Reg.	2nd	
1969–70	4	1ª Reg.	6th	
1970–71	4	1ª Reg.	15th	
1971–72	5	2ª Reg.	3rd	
1972–73	5	2ª Reg.	2nd	
1973–74	4	1ª Reg.	12th	
1974–75	4	Reg. Pref.	10th	
1975–76	4	Reg. Pref.	8th	
1976–77	4	Reg. Pref.	6th	
1977–78	5	Reg. Pref.	1st	
1978–79	4	3ª	8th	
1979–80	4	3ª	11th	Second round
1980–81	4	3ª	4th	First round
1981–82	4	3ª	2nd	Second round
1982–83	4	3ª	5th	Second round
1983–84	4	3ª	7th	First round
1984–85	4	3ª	17th	

Season	Tier	Division	Place	Copa del Rey
1985–86	5	Reg. Pref.	1st	
1986–87	4	3ª	9th	
1987–88	4	3ª	2nd	
1988–89	4	3ª	13th	
1989–90	4	3ª	2nd	
1990–91	4	3ª	7th	First round
1991–92	4	3ª	9th	
1992–93	4	3ª	5th	
1993–94	4	3ª	9th	
1994–95	4	3ª	14th	
1995–96	4	3ª	9th	
1996–97	4	3ª	6th	
1997–98	4	3ª	12th	
1998–99	4	3ª	10th	
1999–2000	4	3ª	11th	
2000–01	4	3ª	4th	
2001–02	4	3ª	5th	
2002–03	4	3ª	9th	
2003–04	4	3ª	15th	
2004–05	4	3ª	10th	

Season	Tier	Division	Place	Copa del Rey
2005–06	4	3ª	19th	
2006–07	5	Reg. Pref.	13th	
2007–08	5	Reg. Pref.	5th	
2008–09	5	Reg. Pref.	12th	
2009–10	5	Div. Hon.	2nd	
2010–11	5	Div. Hon.	10th	
2011–12	5	Div. Hon.	8th	
2012–13	5	Div. Hon.	15th	
2013–14	5	Div. Hon.	6th	
2014–15	5	Div. Hon.	1st	
2015–16	4	3ª	17th	
2016–17	4	3ª	18th	
2017–18	5	Div. Hon.	13th	
2018–19	5	Div. Hon.	4th	
2019–20	5	Div. Hon.	1st	
2020–21	4	3ª	8th / 4th	
2021–22	5	3ª RFEF	15th	
2022–23	5	3ª Fed.	9th	
2023–24	5	3ª Fed.	17th	
2024–25	6	Div. Hon.	12th	

Season	Tier	Division	Place	Copa del Rey
2025–26	6	Div. Hon.		

- 32 seasons in Tercera División
- 3 seasons in Tercera Federación/Tercera División RFEF
