= CD Hernani =

Association football club in Spain

Hernani
- Full name: Club Deportivo Hernani
- Founded: 1940
- Ground: Zubipe, Hernani; Gipuzkoa, Basque Country, Spain
- Capacity: 6,000
- President: Martxelo Ezponda
- Manager: Igor San Miguel
- League: División de Honor
- 2024–25: División de Honor, 15th of 18
Home colours	Away colours

Club Deportivo Hernani is a Spanish football club based in Hernani, Gipuzkoa, in the autonomous community of Basque Country. Founded in 1940, it plays in División de Honor, holding home games at Campo de Fútbol Zubipe, with a capacity of 6,000 people.

== Season to season ==
Season	Tier	Division	Place	Copa del Rey
1949–50	5	2ª Reg.	3rd	
1950–51	5	2ª Reg.	2nd	
1951–52	4	1ª Reg.	4th	
1952–53	4	1ª Reg.	1st	
1953–54	4	1ª Reg.	4th	
1954–55	4	1ª Reg.	2nd	
1955–56	4	1ª Reg.	1st	
1956–57	3	3ª	8th	
1957–58	3	3ª	9th	
1958–59	3	3ª	14th	
1959–60	4	1ª Reg.	4th	
1960–61	4	1ª Reg.	5th	
1961–62	4	1ª Reg.	6th	
1962–63	4	1ª Reg.	8th	
1963–64	4	1ª Reg.	5th	
1964–65	4	1ª Reg.	11th	
1965–66	4	1ª Reg.	6th	
1966–67	4	1ª Reg.	2nd	
1967–68	4	1ª Reg.	1st	
1968–69	4	1ª Reg.	4th	

Season	Tier	Division	Place	Copa del Rey
1969–70	4	1ª Reg.	11th	
1970–71	4	1ª Reg.	6th	
1971–72	4	1ª Reg.	10th	
1972–73	4	1ª Reg.	15th	
1973–74	5	2ª Reg.	2nd	
1974–75	4	Reg. Pref.	12th	
1975–76	4	Reg. Pref.	17th	
1976–77	5	1ª Reg.	1st	
1977–78	5	Reg. Pref.	4th	
1978–79	5	Reg. Pref.	19th	
1979–80	6	1ª Reg.	3rd	
1980–81	5	Reg. Pref.	18th	
1981–82	5	Reg. Pref.	13th	
1982–83	5	Reg. Pref.	4th	
1983–84	5	Reg. Pref.	2nd	
1984–85	4	3ª	10th	
1985–86	4	3ª	17th	
1986–87	4	3ª	15th	
1987–88	4	3ª	3rd	
1988–89	4	3ª	14th	

Season	Tier	Division	Place	Copa del Rey
1989–90	4	3ª	1st	
1991–92	3	2ª B	14th	Second round
1992–93	3	2ª B	17th	
1993–94	4	3ª	12th	
1994–95	4	3ª	3rd	
1995–96	4	3ª	12th	
1996–97	4	3ª	16th	
1997–98	4	3ª	9th	
1998–99	4	3ª	5th	
1999–2000	4	3ª	8th	
2000–01	4	3ª	18th	
2001–02	5	Reg. Pref.	8th	
2002–03	5	Reg. Pref.	12th	
2003–04	5	Reg. Pref.	19th	
2004–05	6	1ª Reg.	2nd	
2005–06	5	Reg. Pref.	10th	
2006–07	5	Reg. Pref.	2nd	
2007–08	5	Reg. Pref.	10th	
2008–09	5	Reg. Pref.	2nd	

Season	Tier	Division	Place	Copa del Rey
2009–10	5	Reg. Pref.	12th	
2010–11	5	Reg. Pref.	1st	
2011–12	4	3ª	19th	
2012–13	5	Div. Hon.	2nd	
2013–14	5	Div. Hon.	7th	
2014–15	5	Div. Hon.	3rd	
2015–16	5	Div. Hon.	6th	
2016–17	5	Div. Hon.	2nd	
2017–18	5	Div. Hon.	4th	
2018–19	5	Div. Hon.	11th	
2019–20	5	Div. Hon.	3rd	
2020–21	5	Div. Hon.	2nd	
2021–22	6	Div. Hon.	5th	Preliminary
2022–23	6	Div. Hon.	4th	
2023–24	6	Div. Hon.	13th	
2024–25	6	Div. Hon.	15th	
2025–26	6	Div. Hon.		

- 2 seasons in Segunda División B
- 19 seasons in Tercera División
