= SD Deusto =

Association football club in Spain

Coordinates: 43.271523°N 2.956336°W

Deusto
- Full name: Sociedad Deportiva Deusto
- Nickname: Tomateros
- Founded: 1913
- Ground: Etxezuri, Deusto, Basque Country, Spain
- Capacity: 1,000
- President: Aner Sánchez Basaguren
- Head coach: Aritza Escandón
- League: División de Honor
- 2025–26: Tercera Federación – Group 4, 18th of 18 (relegated)
| Home colours | Away colours |

Sociedad Deportiva Deusto is a Spanish football team based in Deusto (Greater Bilbao), in the autonomous community of Basque Country. Founded in 1913, it plays in the División de Honor, holding home games at Campo de Fútbol de Etxezuri, with a capacity of 1,000 seats.

== History ==
=== Club names ===
- Sociedad Deportiva Deusto (1913–1950, 1964–)
- Sociedad Deportiva Deusto-Universidad (1950–1964)

== Season to season ==
| Season | Tier | Division | Place | Copa del Rey |
|---|---|---|---|---|
| 1928–29 | 5 | 2ª Reg. P. | 6th | |
| 1929–30 | 5 | 2ª Reg. P. | 3rd | |
| 1930–31 | 5 | 2ª Reg. P. | 5th | |
| 1931–32 | 5 | 2ª Reg. P. | 7th | |
| 1932–1939 | DNP | | | |
| 1939–40 | 5 | 1ª Reg. B | 1st | |
| 1940–41 | 4 | 1ª Reg. | 5th | |
| 1941–42 | 3 | 1ª Reg. | 5th | |
| 1942–43 | 3 | 1ª Reg. | 8th | |
| 1943–44 | 4 | 1ª Reg. | 2nd | |
| 1944–45 | 4 | 1ª Reg. | 4th | |
| 1945–46 | 4 | 1ª Reg. | 3rd | |
| 1946–47 | 4 | 1ª Reg. | 2nd | |
| 1947–48 | 4 | 1ª Reg. | 1st | |
| 1948–49 | 4 | 1ª Reg. | 10th | |
| 1949–50 | 4 | 1ª Reg. | 9th | |
| 1950–51 | 4 | 1ª Reg. | 12th | |
| 1951–52 | 5 | 2ª Reg. | 7th | |
| 1952–53 | 5 | 2ª Reg. | 6th | |
| 1953–54 | 5 | 2ª Reg. | 2nd | |

| Season | Tier | Division | Place | Copa del Rey |
|---|---|---|---|---|
| 1954–55 | 4 | 1ª Reg. | 10th | |
| 1955–56 | 4 | 1ª Reg. | 2nd | |
| 1956–57 | 3 | 3ª | 5th | |
| 1957–58 | 3 | 3ª | 11th | |
| 1958–59 | 3 | 3ª | 4th | |
| 1959–60 | 3 | 3ª | 8th | |
| 1960–61 | 3 | 3ª | 9th | |
| 1961–62 | 3 | 3ª | 14th | |
| 1962–63 | 3 | 3ª | 14th | |
| 1963–64 | 4 | 1ª Reg. | 2nd | |
| 1964–65 | 3 | 3ª | 15th | |
| 1965–66 | 4 | 1ª Reg. | 3rd | |
| 1966–67 | 3 | 3ª | 8th | |
| 1967–68 | 3 | 3ª | 13th | |
| 1968–69 | 4 | Reg. Pref. | 4th | |
| 1969–70 | 4 | Reg. Pref. | 7th | |
| 1970–71 | 4 | Reg. Pref. | 4th | |
| 1971–72 | 4 | Reg. Pref. | 13th | |
| 1972–73 | 4 | Reg. Pref. | 6th | |
| 1973–74 | 4 | Reg. Pref. | 11th | |

| Season | Tier | Division | Place | Copa del Rey |
|---|---|---|---|---|
| 1974–75 | 4 | Reg. Pref. | 9th | |
| 1975–76 | 4 | Reg. Pref. | 5th | |
| 1976–77 | 4 | Reg. Pref. | 9th | |
| 1977–78 | 5 | Reg. Pref. | 11th | |
| 1978–79 | 5 | Reg. Pref. | 1st | |
| 1979–80 | 4 | 3ª | 16th | First round |
| 1980–81 | 4 | 3ª | 13th | |
| 1981–82 | 4 | 3ª | 4th | |
| 1982–83 | 4 | 3ª | 12th | Second round |
| 1983–84 | 4 | 3ª | 12th | |
| 1984–85 | 4 | 3ª | 20th | |
| 1985–86 | 5 | Reg. Pref. | 2nd | |
| 1986–87 | 5 | Reg. Pref. | 9th | |
| 1987–88 | 5 | Reg. Pref. | 6th | |
| 1988–89 | 5 | Reg. Pref. | 11th | |
| 1989–90 | 5 | Reg. Pref. | 6th | |
| 1990–91 | 5 | Terr. Pref. | 10th | |
| 1991–92 | 5 | Terr. Pref. | 2nd | |
| 1992–93 | 5 | Terr. Pref. | 6th | |
| 1993–94 | 5 | Terr. Pref. | 12th | |

| Season | Tier | Division | Place | Copa del Rey |
|---|---|---|---|---|
| 1994–95 | 5 | Terr. Pref. | 19th | |
| 1995–96 | 6 | 1ª Terr. | 1st | |
| 1996–97 | 5 | Terr. Pref. | 9th | |
| 1997–98 | 5 | Terr. Pref. | 13th | |
| 1998–99 | 5 | Terr. Pref. | 5th | |
| 1999–2000 | 5 | Terr. Pref. | 11th | |
| 2000–01 | 5 | Terr. Pref. | 15th | |
| 2001–02 | 5 | Terr. Pref. | 18th | |
| 2002–03 | 6 | Pref. | 13th | |
| 2003–04 | 6 | Pref. | 13th | |
| 2004–05 | 6 | Pref. | 6th | |
| 2005–06 | 6 | Pref. | 2nd | |
| 2006–07 | 5 | Div. Hon. | 14th | |
| 2007–08 | 5 | Div. Hon. | 15th | |
| 2008–09 | 5 | Div. Hon. | 9th | |
| 2009–10 | 5 | Div. Hon. | 9th | |
| 2010–11 | 5 | Div. Hon. | 6th | |
| 2011–12 | 5 | Div. Hon. | 4th | |
| 2012–13 | 5 | Div. Hon. | 10th | |
| 2013–14 | 5 | Div. Hon. | 10th | |

| Season | Tier | Division | Place | Copa del Rey |
|---|---|---|---|---|
| 2014–15 | 5 | Div. Hon. | 1st | |
| 2015–16 | 4 | 3ª | 16th | |
| 2016–17 | 4 | 3ª | 7th | |
| 2017–18 | 4 | 3ª | 8th | |
| 2018–19 | 4 | 3ª | 15th | |
| 2019–20 | 4 | 3ª | 18th | |
| 2020–21 | 4 | 3ª | 4th / 2nd | |
| 2021–22 | 5 | 3ª RFEF | 13th | |
| 2022–23 | 5 | 3ª Fed. | 5th | |
| 2023–24 | 5 | 3ª Fed. | 4th | |
| 2024–25 | 5 | 3ª Fed. | 5th | |
| 2025–26 | 5 | 3ª Fed. | | |

- 22 seasons in Tercera División
- 5 seasons in Tercera Federación/Tercera División RFEF
