= CD Anaitasuna =

Spanish football team

Coordinates: 43.17393°N 2.30011°W

Anaitasuna
- Full name: Club Deportivo Anaitasuna
- Founded: 1944
- Ground: Txerloia, Azkoitia, Basque Country, Spain
- Capacity: 1,500
- President: Pedro Urdapilleta
- Head coach: Xabier Artetxe
- League: División de Honor
- 2025–26: División de Honor, 2nd of 18
Home colours	Away colours

Club Deportivo Anaitasuna is a Spanish football team based in Azkoitia, in the Autonomous Community of the Basque Country. Founded in 1934, it plays in the División de Honor, holding home games at Campo Txerloia which has a capacity of 1,500 spectators. The team's name in Basque means brotherhood. Their closest rivals are Lagun Onak from Azpeitia.

== History ==
Having won the Campeonato de Aficionados (national amateur cup) in 1973, their most successful period was in the 1980s when they were members of the Tercera División across the decade. In 1980–81 and 1982–83, their 6th-place league finish earned entry to the following season's Copa del Rey. Since then they have mostly played at provincial level, being promoted as the Gipuzkoa league winners four times (1993, 2001, 2012, 2016) but being relegated back down immediately on each occasion. They went up again in 2020, and also played in the 2020–21 Copa del Rey, losing to top-tier regulars Getafe CF only via a penalty in stoppage time.

The club has youth sections and a women's team (who finished 6th in Spain in 1994–95), and also competes in several other sports.

== Season to season ==
Season	Tier	Division	Place	Copa del Rey
1944–45	5	2ª Reg.	7th	
1945–46	4	1ª Reg.	3rd	
1946–47	4	1ª Reg.	4th	
1947–48	4	1ª Reg.	11th	
1948–49	4	1ª Reg.	12th	
1949–50	5	2ª Reg.	6th	
1950–51	5	2ª Reg.	4th	
1951–52	4	1ª Reg.	4th	
1952–53	4	1ª Reg.	1st	
1953–54	3	3ª	5th	
1954–55	3	3ª	8th	
1955–56	4	1ª Reg.	3rd	
1956–57	3	3ª	9th	
1957–58	3	3ª	12th	
1958–59	3	3ª	11th	
1959–60	3	3ª	15th	
1960–61	4	1ª Reg.	3rd	
1961–62	4	1ª Reg.	11th	
1962–63	4	1ª Reg.	9th	
1963–64	4	1ª Reg.	9th	

Season	Tier	Division	Place	Copa del Rey
1964–65	4	1ª Reg.	13th	
1965–66	DNP			
1966–67	4	1ª Reg.	6th	
1967–68	4	1ª Reg.	3rd	
1968–69	4	1ª Reg.	12th	
1969–70	4	1ª Reg.	5th	
1970–71	4	1ª Reg.	5th	
1971–72	4	1ª Reg.	9th	
1972–73	4	1ª Reg.	3rd	
1973–74	4	1ª Reg.	13th	
1974–75	4	Reg. Pref.	5th	
1975–76	4	Reg. Pref.	5th	
1976–77	4	Reg. Pref.	4th	
1977–78	5	Reg. Pref.	5th	
1978–79	5	Reg. Pref.	4th	
1979–80	5	Reg. Pref.	4th	
1980–81	4	3ª	6th	
1981–82	4	3ª	9th	
1982–83	4	3ª	6th	
1983–84	4	3ª	15th	Second round

Season	Tier	Division	Place	Copa del Rey
1984–85	4	3ª	15th	
1985–86	4	3ª	15th	
1986–87	4	3ª	17th	
1987–88	4	3ª	12th	
1988–89	4	3ª	12th	
1989–90	4	3ª	20th	
1990–91	5	Reg. Pref.	6th	
1991–92	5	Reg. Pref.	3rd	
1992–93	5	Reg. Pref.	1st	
1993–94	4	3ª	19th	
1994–95	5	Reg. Pref.	4th	
1995–96	5	Reg. Pref.	7th	
1996–97	5	Reg. Pref.	6th	
1997–98	5	Reg. Pref.	2nd	
1998–99	5	Reg. Pref.	4th	
1999–2000	5	Reg. Pref.	6th	
2000–01	5	Reg. Pref.	1st	
2001–02	4	3ª	19th	
2002–03	5	Reg. Pref.	6th	
2003–04	5	Reg. Pref.	10th	

Season	Tier	Division	Place	Copa del Rey
2004–05	5	Reg. Pref.	14th	
2005–06	5	Reg. Pref.	14th	
2006–07	5	Reg. Pref.	9th	
2007–08	5	Reg. Pref.	12th	
2008–09	5	Reg. Pref.	16th	
2009–10	6	Pref.	1st	
2010–11	5	Div. Hon.	5th	
2011–12	5	Div. Hon.	1st	
2012–13	4	3ª	20th	
2013–14	5	Div. Hon.	4th	
2014–15	5	Div. Hon.	5th	
2015–16	5	Div. Hon.	2nd	
2016–17	5	Div. Hon.	1st	
2017–18	4	3ª	18th	
2018–19	5	Div. Hon.	3rd	
2019–20	5	Div. Hon.	1st	
2020–21	4	3ª	5th / 1st	First round
2021–22	5	3ª RFEF	10th	
2022–23	5	3ª Fed.	10th	
2023–24	5	3ª Fed.	16th	

Season	Tier	Division	Place	Copa del Rey
2024–25	6	Div. Hon.	6th	
2025–26	6	Div. Hon.	2nd	
2026–27	6	Div. Hon.		TBD

- 21 seasons in Tercera División
- 3 seasons in Tercera Federación/Tercera División RFEF
