= Mutriku FT =

Mutriku
- Full name: Mutriku Futbol Taldea
- Founded: 1944
- Ground: San Miguel, Mutriku, Basque Country, Spain
- Capacity: 300
- President: Markel Rodríguez
- Manager: Igor Quindos
- League: Preferente – Group 2
- 2025–26: División de Honor, 15th of 18 (relegated)
- Website: https://www.mutrikufutboltaldea.eus/
Home colours	Away colours

Mutriku Futbol Taldea is a Spanish football team based in Mutriku, in the autonomous community of Basque Country. Founded in 1944 it plays in Preferente – Group 2, holding home games at Campo de Fútbol San Miguel, which has a capacity of 300 spectators.

== History ==
=== Club background ===
- Club Deportivo Motrico (1944–1981)
- Mutriku Futbol Taldea (1981–1984; 1987–)
- Mutriku Club de Fútbol (1984–1987)

== Season to season ==
Season	Tier	Division	Place	Copa del Rey
1944–45	5	2ª Reg.	4th	
1945–46	4	1ª Reg.	2nd	
1946–47	4	1ª Reg.	6th	
1947–48	4	1ª Reg.	8th	
1948–49	4	1ª Reg.	7th	
1949–50	4	1ª Reg.	9th	
1950–51	4	1ª Reg.	9th	
1951–52	4	1ª Reg.	5th	
1952–53	4	1ª Reg.	9th	
1953–54	4	1ª Reg.	6th	
1954–55	4	1ª Reg.	9th	
1955–56	4	1ª Reg.	10th	
1956–57	4	1ª Reg.	1st	
1957–58	4	1ª Reg.	6th	
1958–59	5	2ª Reg.	1st	
1959–60	4	1ª Reg.	2nd	
1960–61	4	1ª Reg.	8th	
1961–62	4	1ª Reg.	(R)	
1962–63	4	1ª Reg.	2nd	
1963–64	4	1ª Reg.	1st	

Season	Tier	Division	Place	Copa del Rey
1964–65	3	3ª	5th	
1965–66	3	3ª	5th	
1966–67	3	3ª	12th	
1967–68	3	3ª	10th	
1968–69	3	3ª	15th	
1969–70	3	3ª	17th	First round
1970–71	4	1ª Reg.	13th	
1971–72	4	1ª Reg.	7th	
1972–73	4	1ª Reg.	11th	
1973–74	4	1ª Reg.	6th	
1974–75	4	Reg. Pref.	2nd	
1975–76	4	Reg. Pref.	1st	
1976–77	4	Reg. Pref.	1st	
1977–78	4	3ª	12th	
1978–79	4	3ª	10th	
1979–80	4	3ª	13th	
1980–81	4	3ª	19th	
1981–82	5	Reg. Pref.	6th	
1982–83	5	Reg. Pref.	7th	
1983–84	5	Reg. Pref.	1st	

Season	Tier	Division	Place	Copa del Rey
1984–85	4	3ª	14th	
1985–86	4	3ª	16th	
1986–87	4	3ª	18th	
1987–88	5	Reg. Pref.	1st	
1988–89	4	3ª	19th	
1989–90	5	Reg. Pref.	8th	
1990–91	5	Reg. Pref.	3rd	
1991–92	5	Reg. Pref.	10th	
1992–93	5	Reg. Pref.	3rd	
1993–94	5	Reg. Pref.	3rd	
1994–95	5	Reg. Pref.	3rd	
1995–96	5	Reg. Pref.	3rd	
1996–97	5	Reg. Pref.	2nd	
1997–98	5	Reg. Pref.	16th	
1998–99	5	Reg. Pref.	10th	
1999–2000	5	Reg. Pref.	9th	
2000–01	5	Reg. Pref.	13th	
2001–02	5	Reg. Pref.	19th	
2002–03	6	1ª Reg.	7th	
2003–04	6	1ª Reg.	1st	

Season	Tier	Division	Place	Copa del Rey
2004–05	5	Reg. Pref.	9th	
2005–06	5	Reg. Pref.	12th	
2006–07	5	Reg. Pref.	16th	
2007–08	6	1ª Reg.	9th	
2008–09	6	1ª Reg.	2nd	
2009–10	6	Pref.	8th	
2010–11	6	Pref.	3rd	
2011–12	6	Pref.	8th	
2012–13	6	Pref.	6th	
2013–14	6	Pref.	6th	
2014–15	6	Pref.	2nd	
2015–16	5	Div. Hon.	4th	
2016–17	5	Div. Hon.	5th	
2017–18	5	Div. Hon.	9th	
2018–19	5	Div. Hon.	5th	
2019–20	5	Div. Hon.	7th	
2020–21	5	Div. Hon.	5th	
2021–22	6	Div. Hon.	11th	
2022–23	6	Div. Hon.	12th	
2023–24	6	Div. Hon.	6th	

Season	Tier	Division	Place	Copa del Rey
2024–25	6	Div. Hon.	9th	
2025–26	6	Div. Hon.		

- 14 seasons in Tercera División
