= Mondragón CF =

Association football club in Spain

Mondragón
- Full name: Mondragón Club de Fútbol
- Nicknames: Mondra; Blanquimorados (White-and-purples)
- Founded: 1913
- Ground: Mojategi, Mondragón, Basque Country, Spain
- Capacity: 2,000
- President: Xabier Etxeberria
- Head coach: Jorge Santiago
- League: División de Honor
- 2025–26: División de Honor, 8th of 18
| Home colours | Away colours |

Mondragón Club de Fútbol is a Spanish football team based in Mondragón, in the autonomous community of Basque Country. Founded in 1913, it plays in División de Honor, holding home games at Campo de Fútbol de Mojategi, which has a capacity of 2,000 spectators.

Mondragón is the fourth-oldest club from the region of Gipuzkoa, only behind Real Unión, SD Beasain and Real Sociedad.

== Season to season ==
| Season | Tier | Division | Place | Copa del Rey |
|---|---|---|---|---|
| 1944–45 | 5 | 2ª Reg. | 1st | |
| 1945–46 | 4 | 1ª Reg. | 5th | |
| 1946–47 | 4 | 1ª Reg. | 3rd | |
| 1947–48 | 4 | 1ª Reg. | 2nd | |
| 1948–49 | 4 | 1ª Reg. | 5th | |
| 1949–50 | 4 | 1ª Reg. | 4th | |
| 1950–51 | 4 | 1ª Reg. | 1st | |
| 1951–52 | 4 | 1ª Reg. | 2nd | |
| 1952–53 | 3 | 3ª | 5th | |
| 1953–54 | 3 | 3ª | 4th | |
| 1954–55 | 3 | 3ª | 3rd | |
| 1955–56 | 3 | 3ª | 3rd | |
| 1956–57 | 3 | 3ª | 15th | |
| 1957–58 | 4 | 1ª Reg. | 4th | |
| 1958–59 | 4 | 1ª Reg. | 9th | |
| 1959–60 | 5 | 2ª Reg. | 2nd | |
| 1960–61 | 4 | 1ª Reg. | 1st | |
| 1961–62 | 4 | 1ª Reg. | 2nd | |
| 1962–63 | 3 | 3ª | 4th | |
| 1963–64 | 3 | 3ª | 14th | |

| Season | Tier | Division | Place | Copa del Rey |
|---|---|---|---|---|
| 1964–65 | 3 | 3ª | 13th | |
| 1965–66 | 3 | 3ª | 4th | |
| 1966–67 | 3 | 3ª | 10th | |
| 1967–68 | 3 | 3ª | 14th | |
| 1968–69 | 4 | 1ª Reg. | 13th | |
| 1969–70 | 4 | 1ª Reg. | 15th | |
| 1970–71 | 5 | 2ª Reg. | 6th | |
| 1971–72 | 5 | 2ª Reg. | 4th | |
| 1972–73 | 5 | 2ª Reg. | 2nd | |
| 1973–74 | 5 | 2ª Reg. | 4th | |
| 1974–75 | 5 | 1ª Reg. | 3rd | |
| 1975–76 | 5 | 1ª Reg. | 8th | |
| 1976–77 | 5 | 1ª Reg. | 8th | |
| 1977–78 | 6 | 1ª Reg. | 2nd | |
| 1978–79 | 5 | Reg. Pref. | 18th | |
| 1979–80 | 5 | Reg. Pref. | 15th | |
| 1980–81 | 5 | Reg. Pref. | 2nd | |
| 1981–82 | 5 | Reg. Pref. | 3rd | |
| 1983–84 | 5 | Reg. Pref. | 1st | |
| 1983–84 | 4 | 3ª | 19th | |

| Season | Tier | Division | Place | Copa del Rey |
|---|---|---|---|---|
| 1984–85 | 5 | Reg. Pref. | 3rd | |
| 1985–86 | 5 | Reg. Pref. | 6th | |
| 1986–87 | 5 | Reg. Pref. | 2nd | |
| 1987–88 | 4 | 3ª | 11th | |
| 1988–89 | 4 | 3ª | 9th | |
| 1989–90 | 4 | 3ª | 8th | |
| 1990–91 | 4 | 3ª | 11th | |
| 1991–92 | 4 | 3ª | 12th | |
| 1992–93 | 4 | 3ª | 3rd | |
| 1993–94 | 4 | 3ª | 10th | |
| 1994–95 | 4 | 3ª | 11th | |
| 1995–96 | 4 | 3ª | 18th | |
| 1996–97 | 5 | Reg. Pref. | 3rd | |
| 1997–98 | 5 | Reg. Pref. | 5th | |
| 1998–99 | 5 | Reg. Pref. | 20th | |
| 1999–2000 | 6 | 1ª Reg. | 7th | |
| 2000–01 | 6 | 1ª Reg. | 8th | |
| 2001–02 | 6 | 1ª Reg. | 7th | |
| 2002–03 | 6 | 1ª Reg. | 1st | |
| 2003–04 | 5 | Reg. Pref. | 6th | |

| Season | Tier | Division | Place | Copa del Rey |
|---|---|---|---|---|
| 2004–05 | 5 | Reg. Pref. | 8th | |
| 2005–06 | 5 | Reg. Pref. | 9th | |
| 2006–07 | 5 | Reg. Pref. | 7th | |
| 2007–08 | 5 | Reg. Pref. | 7th | |
| 2008–09 | 5 | Reg. Pref. | 11th | |
| 2009–10 | 5 | Div. Hon. | 6th | |
| 2010–11 | 5 | Div. Hon. | 11th | |
| 2011–12 | 5 | Div. Hon. | 15th | |
| 2012–13 | 5 | Div. Hon. | 16th | |
| 2013–14 | 6 | Pref. | 7th | |
| 2014–15 | 6 | Pref. | 3rd | |
| 2015–16 | 6 | Pref. | 2nd | |
| 2016–17 | 5 | Div. Hon. | 7th | |
| 2017–18 | 5 | Div. Hon. | 7th | |
| 2018–19 | 5 | Div. Hon. | 4th | |
| 2019–20 | 5 | Div. Hon. | 13th | |
| 2020–21 | 5 | Div. Hon. | 8th | |
| 2021–22 | 6 | Div. Hon. | 6th | |
| 2022–23 | 6 | Div. Hon. | 18th | |
| 2023–24 | 7 | Pref. | 1st | |

| Season | Tier | Division | Place | Copa del Rey |
|---|---|---|---|---|
| 2024–25 | 6 | Div. Hon. | 12th | |
| 2025–26 | 6 | Div. Hon. | 8th | |
| 2026–27 | 6 | Div. Hon. | | |

- 21 seasons in Tercera División
