= Sergio Ruiz (footballer) =

Spanish footballer (born 1994)

Personal information
- Full name: Sergio Ruiz Alonso
- Date of birth: 16 December 1994 (age 31)
- Place of birth: El Astillero, Spain
- Height: 1.71 m (5 ft 7 in)
- Positions: Defensive midfielder; right-back

Team information
- Current team: Las Palmas

Youth career
- Arenas de Frajanas
- Atlético Perines
- Laredo

Senior career*
Years	Team	Apps	(Gls)
2013–2014	Pontejos	37	(5)
2014–2015	Atlético Albericia	33	(5)
2015–2016	Racing B	36	(7)
2016–2020	Racing Santander	127	(8)
2020–2022	Charlotte FC	18	(1)
2020–2021	→ Las Palmas (loan)	43	(5)
2022–2026	Granada	124	(1)
2026–	Las Palmas	0	(0)
- * Club domestic league appearances and goals as of 9 June 2026

Sergio Ruiz Alonso (born 16 December 1994) is a Spanish professional footballer who plays for UD Las Palmas. Mainly a defensive midfielder, he can also play as a right back.

== Club career ==
Born in El Astillero, Cantabria, Ruiz represented CD Arenas de Trajanas, CA Perines and CD Laredo as a youth. In 2013, after finishing his formation, he joined Tercera División side CD Pontejos, and made his debut for the club during the campaign.

Ruiz subsequently represented fellow fourth division sides SD Atlético Albericia and Racing de Santander B before being promoted to the latter's first team for the 2016–17 season, in Segunda División B.

On 17 January 2019, Ruiz extended his contract with the Verdiblancos until 2022. He contributed with six goals in 34 appearances in 2018–19, as his side returned to Segunda División after a four-year absence.

Ruiz made his professional debut on 17 August 2019, coming on as a late substitute for Álvaro Cejudo in a 0–1 home loss against Málaga CF.

On 8 July 2020, it was announced that Ruiz became the first ever signing for Charlotte FC ahead of their inaugural season in MLS in 2022. On 3 September, he joined second division side UD Las Palmas on an 18-month loan.

On 9 August 2022, Ruiz signed a four-year contract with Granada CF also in the division two. On 22 June 2026, he returned to Las Palmas on a permanent two-year deal.

== Career statistics ==
As of match played 24 May 2024

Appearances and goals by club, season and competition
Club	Season	League			Cup		Other		Total	
Club	Season	Division	Apps	Goals	Apps	Goals	Apps	Goals	Apps	Goals
Pontejos	2013–14	Tercera Federación	37	5	—		—		37	5
Atlético Albericia	2014–15	Tercera Federación	35	5	0	0	1	0	36	5
Atlético Albericia	2015–16	Tercera Federación	1	2	0	0	—		1	2
Atlético Albericia	Total		36	7	0	0	1	0	37	7
Rayo Cantabria	2015–16	Tercera Federación	34	7	0	0	—		34	7
Racing Santander	2016–17	Segunda División B	28	1	2	0	1 (Note: Appearances in Segunda División B play-offs)	0	31	1
Racing Santander	2017–18	Segunda División B	31	1	1	0	—		32	1
Racing Santander	2018–19	Segunda División B	37	6	3	0	—		40	6
Racing Santander	2019–20	Segunda División	31	0	1	0	—		32	0
Racing Santander	Total		127	8	7	0	1	0	139	8
Las Palmas	2020–21	Segunda División	37	5	0	0	—		37	5
Las Palmas	2021–22	Segunda División	6	0	0	0	—		6	0
Las Palmas	Total		43	5	0	0	—		43	5
Charlotte	2022	MLS	18	1	1	0	0	0	19	1
Granada	2022–23	Segunda División	19	1	1	0	—		20	1
Granada	2023–24	La Liga	35	0	1	0	—		36	0
Granada	Total		54	1	2	0	—		56	1
Career total			349	34	10	0	2	0	361	34

== Honours ==
Granada

- Segunda División: 2022–23
