= CD Guarnizo =

Spanish football team

Coordinates: 43.392697°N 3.855836°W

Cultural Guarnizo
- Full name: Cultural Deportiva Guarnizo
- Founded: 1922
- Ground: El Pilar, Guarnizo, Cantabria, Spain
- Capacity: 2,700
- Chairman: José Luis López Toribio
- Manager: Aurelio Avila Cotera
- League: Tercera Federación – Group 3
- 2025–26: Tercera Federación – Group 3, 4th of 18
Home colours	Away colours

Cultural Deportiva Guarnizo is a Spanish football team based in Guarnizo, El Astillero, in the autonomous community of Cantabria. Founded in 1922, it plays in Tercera Federación – Group 3, holding home games at Estadio El Pilar, which has a capacity of 2,700 spectators.

== History ==
In the 2014–15 season, the club won regional category Preferente Cantabria. It helped to start the next season in Tercera División.

== Season to season ==
Season	Tier	Division	Place	Copa del Rey
1947–48	6	2ª Reg.	3rd	
1948–49	4	1ª Reg.	4th	
1949–50	4	1ª Reg.	12th	
1950–51	4	1ª Reg.	11th	
1951–1955	DNP			
1955–56	6	3ª Reg.	2nd	
1956–57	6	2ª Reg.	2nd	
1957–58	4	1ª Reg.	3rd	
1958–59	4	1ª Reg.	5th	
1959–60	4	1ª Reg.	4th	
1960–61	4	1ª Reg.	1st	
1961–62	3	3ª	13th	
1962–63	3	3ª	11th	
1963–64	3	3ª	12th	
1964–65	3	3ª	14th	
1965–66	3	3ª	16th	
1966–67	4	1ª Reg.	2nd	
1967–68	4	1ª Reg.	1st	
1968–69	4	1ª Reg.	6th	
1969–70	4	1ª Reg.	8th	

Season	Tier	Division	Place	Copa del Rey
1970–71	4	1ª Reg.	5th	
1971–72	4	1ª Reg.	10th	
1972–73	4	1ª Reg.	9th	
1973–74	4	1ª Reg.	9th	
1974–75	4	Reg. Pref.	10th	
1975–76	4	Reg. Pref.	14th	
1976–77	4	Reg. Pref.	5th	
1977–78	5	Reg. Pref.	6th	
1978–79	4	Reg. Pref.	3rd	
1979–80	4	Reg. Pref.	10th	
1980–81	5	Reg. Pref.	5th	
1981–82	5	Reg. Pref.	5th	
1982–83	5	Reg. Pref.	6th	
1983–84	5	Reg. Pref.	10th	
1984–85	5	Reg. Pref.	3rd	
1985–86	4	3ª	15th	
1986–87	4	3ª	10th	
1987–88	4	3ª	8th	
1988–89	4	3ª	7th	
1989–90	4	3ª	19th	

Season	Tier	Division	Place	Copa del Rey
1990–91	5	Reg. Pref.	7th	
1991–92	5	Reg. Pref.	13th	
1992–93	5	Reg. Pref.	4th	
1993–94	5	Reg. Pref.	3rd	
1994–95	4	3ª	12th	
1995–96	4	3ª	10th	
1996–97	4	3ª	16th	
1997–98	4	3ª	7th	
1998–99	4	3ª	12th	
1999–2000	4	3ª	10th	
2000–01	4	3ª	16th	
2001–02	5	Reg. Pref.	6th	
2002–03	5	Reg. Pref.	2nd	
2003–04	4	3ª	11th	
2004–05	4	3ª	19th	
2005–06	5	Reg. Pref.	8th	
2006–07	5	Reg. Pref.	4th	
2007–08	4	3ª	15th	
2008–09	4	3ª	19th	
2009–10	5	Reg. Pref.	1st	

Season	Tier	Division	Place	Copa del Rey
2010–11	4	3ª	13th	
2011–12	4	3ª	11th	
2012–13	4	3ª	10th	
2013–14	4	3ª	19th	
2014–15	5	Reg. Pref.	1st	
2015–16	4	3ª	11th	
2016–17	4	3ª	7th	
2017–18	4	3ª	13th	
2018–19	4	3ª	16th	
2019–20	4	3ª	10th	
2020–21	4	3ª	9th / 1st	
2021–22	5	3ª RFEF	8th	
2022–23	5	3ª Fed.	11th	
2023–24	5	3ª Fed.	9th	
2024–25	5	3ª Fed.	10th	
2025–26	5	3ª Fed.	4th	
2026–27	5	3ª Fed.		

- 31 seasons in Tercera División
- 6 seasons in Tercera Federación/Tercera División RFEF
