= Santi Franco =

Spanish footballer (born 2004)

Personal information
- Full name: Santiago Franco de la Torre
- Date of birth: 18 April 2004 (age 22)
- Place of birth: San Vicente de la Barquera, Spain
- Position: Attacking midfielder

Team information
- Current team: Avilés Industrial
- Number: 24

Youth career
- La Folía
- Gimnástica Torrelavega
- Textil Escudo
- 2022–2023: CIA

Senior career*
Years	Team	Apps	(Gls)
2021–2022	Barquereño	21	(5)
2023–2024	Huesca B	28	(2)
2024–2025	Barquereño	25	(18)
2025–2026	Racing B	29	(7)
2025–2026	Racing Santander	4	(0)
2026–	Avilés Industrial	1	(0)
- * Club domestic league appearances and goals as of 28 August 2026

Santiago "Santi" Franco de la Torre (born 18 April 2004) is a Spanish professional footballer who plays as an attacking midfielder for Real Avilés Industrial CF.

== Career ==
Born in San Vicente de la Barquera, Cantabria, Franco began his career with futsal side CD La Folía FS, and subsequently played for the youth categories of Gimnástica de Torrelavega and SD Textil Escudo before joining Regional Preferente side CD Barquereño in 2021. After making his senior debut for the latter side, he returned to youth setup in the following year after signing for Club Internacional de la Amistad.

On 2 August 2023, Franco moved to SD Huesca and was assigned to the reserves in Tercera Federación. On 30 July of the following year, he returned to Barquereño, with the club now also in the fifth division.

In May 2025, after being the top scorer of their group in the season with 18 goals, Franco went on a trial at Racing de Santander's B-team, and subsequently signed a two-year contract with the club. He made his professional debut on 30 August, coming on as a late substitute for fellow youth graduate Jorge Salinas in a 4–1 Segunda División home routing of AD Ceuta FC.

On 14 August 2026, Franco signed for Primera Federación side Real Avilés Industrial CF.
