= Santoña CF =

Santoña
- Full name: Santoña Club de Fútbol
- Founded: 1917
- Ground: El Paloma, Santoña, Cantabria, Spain
- Capacity: 4,500
- President: (Spain) Carmen Redondo Gutiérrez
- Head coach: (Spain) Jesús Maza
- League: Segunda Regional – Group C
- 2024–25: Segunda Regional – Group B, 13th of 18
Home colours	Away colours

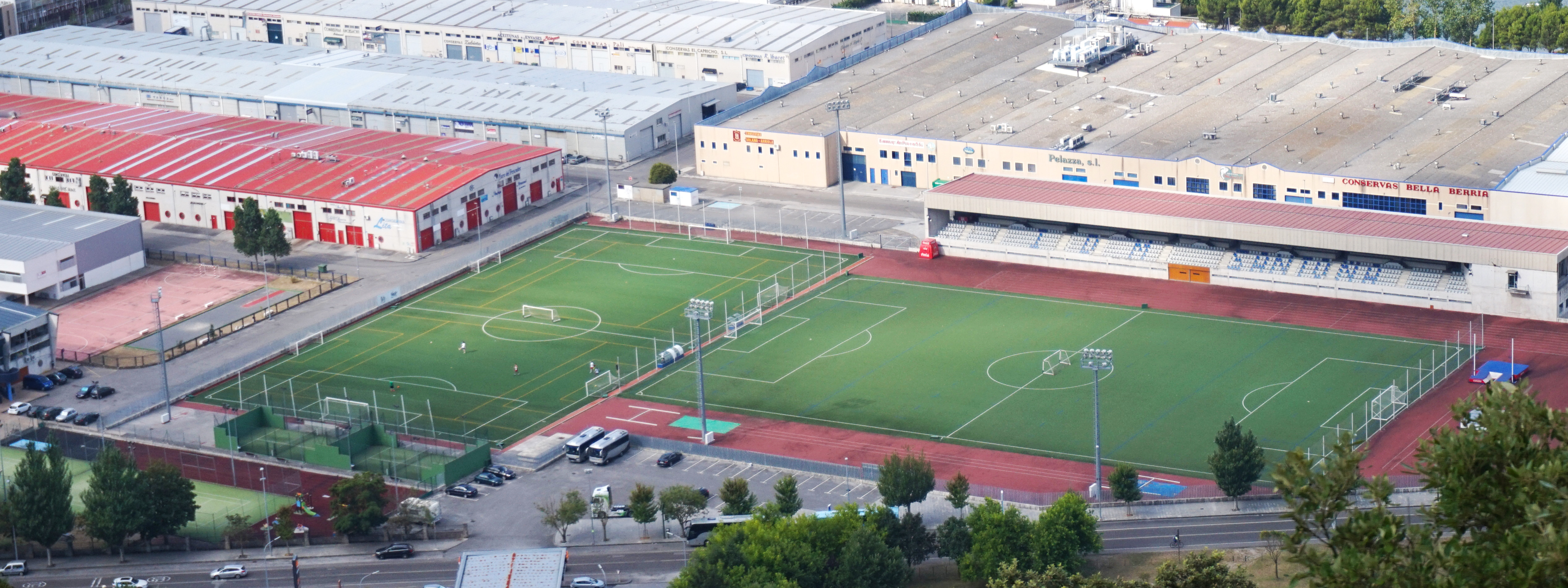
El Paloma stadium

Santoña Club de Fútbol is a football team based in Santoña in the autonomous community of Cantabria. Founded in 1917, it plays in the Segunda Regional – Group C. Its stadium is El Paloma with a capacity of 4,500 seats.

== History ==
=== Club background ===
- Hispania (1917–1922)
- Sociedad Deportiva Unión Santoñesa (1922–1927)
- Club Deportivo Santoñés (1927–1928)
- Paloma Sport (1928–1931)
- Sociedad Deportiva Santoña Foot-ball Club (1931–1941)
- Santoña Club de Fútbol (1941–)

== Season to season ==
Season	Tier	Division	Place	Copa del Rey
1931–32	6	3ª Reg.	4th	
1932–33	5	2ª Reg.	1st	
1933–34	3	3ª	4th	
1934–35	4	1ª Reg.	1st	Second round
1935–36	4	1ª Reg.	2nd	
1939–40	DNP			
1940–41	4	1ª Reg.	7th	
1941–42	DNP			
1942–43	DNP			
1943–44	4	1ª Reg.	1st	
1944–45	3	3ª	9th	
1945–46	3	3ª	8th	
1946–47	3	3ª	10th	
1947–48	3	3ª	14th	Second round
1948–49	4	1ª Reg.	1st	
1949–50	4	1ª Reg.	3rd	
1950–51	4	1ª Reg.	1st	
1951–52	4	1ª Reg.	1st	
1952–53	4	1ª Reg.	6th	
1953–54	4	1ª Reg.	1st	

Season	Tier	Division	Place	Copa del Rey
1954–55	3	3ª	9th	
1955–56	3	3ª	4th	
1956–57	3	3ª	16th	
1957–58	4	1ª Reg.	1st	
1958–59	3	3ª	11th	
1959–60	3	3ª	11th	
1960–61	3	3ª	10th	
1961–62	3	3ª	11th	
1962–63	3	3ª	15th	
1963–64	4	1ª Reg.	4th	
1964–65	4	1ª Reg.	5th	
1965–66	4	1ª Reg.	1st	
1966–67	3	3ª	13th	
1967–68	4	1ª Reg.	4th	
1968–69	4	1ª Reg.	3rd	
1969–70	4	1ª Reg.	3rd	
1970–71	4	1ª Reg.	2nd	
1971–72	4	1ª Reg.	3rd	
1972–73	4	1ª Reg.	2nd	
1973–74	4	1ª Reg.	6th	

Season	Tier	Division	Place	Copa del Rey
1974–75	4	Reg. Pref.	8th	
1975–76	4	Reg. Pref.	7th	
1976–77	4	Reg. Pref.	1st	
1977–78	4	3ª	9th	First round
1978–79	4	3ª	16th	Second round
1979–80	4	3ª	13th	Second round
1980–81	4	3ª	2nd	First round
1981–82	4	3ª	3rd	First round
1982–83	4	3ª	14th	First round
1983–84	4	3ª	9th	
1984–85	4	3ª	11th	
1985–86	4	3ª	17th	
1986–87	4	3ª	5th	
1987–88	4	3ª	2nd	Third round
1988–89	3	2ª B	18th	
1989–90	4	3ª	4th	
1990–91	4	3ª	9th	First round
1991–92	4	3ª	8th	
1992–93	4	3ª	18th	
1993–94	5	Reg. Pref.	2nd	

Season	Tier	Division	Place	Copa del Rey
1994–95	4	3ª	18th	
1995–96	5	Reg. Pref.	2nd	
1996–97	4	3ª	14th	
1997–98	4	3ª	6th	
1998–99	4	3ª	5th	
1999–2000	4	3ª	6th	
2000–01	4	3ª	13th	
2001–02	4	3ª	20th	
2002–03	5	Reg. Pref.	15th	
2003–04	6	1ª Reg.	1st	
2004–05	5	Reg. Pref.	3rd	
2005–06	4	3ª	15th	
2006–07	4	3ª	13th	
2007–08	4	3ª	12th	
2008–09	4	3ª	18th	
2009–10	5	Reg. Pref.	3rd	
2010–11	4	3ª	19th	
2011–12	5	Reg. Pref.	2nd	
2012–13	4	3ª	8th	
2013–14	4	3ª	17th	

Season	Tier	Division	Place	Copa del Rey
2014–15	4	3ª	17th	
2015–16	5	Reg. Pref.	15th	
2016–17	5	Reg. Pref.	11th	
2017–18	5	Reg. Pref.	16th	
2018–19	6	1ª Reg.	8th	
2019–20	6	1ª Reg.	6th	
2020–21	6	1ª Reg.	9th	
2021–22	8	2ª Reg.	3rd	
2022–23	8	2ª Reg.	3rd	
2023–24	8	2ª Reg.	6th	
2024–25	8	2ª Reg.	13th	
2025–26	8	2ª Reg.		

- 1 seasons in Segunda División B
- 44 seasons in Tercera División

== Famous players ==
- (Spain) Pedro Munitis
