= Castro FC =

Spanish football club

Castro
- Full name: Castro Fútbol Club
- Founded: 1952
- Ground: Mioño, Castro Urdiales, Cantabria, Spain
- Capacity: 1,000
- Chairman: (Spain) Jose Del Campo
- Manager: (Spain) Joseba Saralegui
- League: Tercera Federación – Group 3
- 2025–26: Tercera Federación – Group 3, 11th of 18
- Website: www.castrofutbolclub.es
Home colours	Away colours

Castro Fútbol Club is a Spanish football team based in Castro Urdiales, in the autonomous community of Cantabria. Founded in 1952, it plays in Tercera Federación – Group 3, holding home games at Estadio Riomar, which has a capacity of 1,000 spectators.

== Season to season ==
Season	Tier	Division	Place	Copa del Rey
1955–56	6	3ª Reg.	1st	
1956–57	5	2ª Reg.	1st	
1957–58	4	1ª Reg.	4th	
1958–59	4	1ª Reg.	10th	
1959–60	4	1ª Reg.	3rd	
1960–61	4	1ª Reg.	14th	
1961–62	4	1ª Reg.	6th	
1962–63	4	1ª Reg.	2nd	
1963–64	4	1ª Reg.	3rd	
1964–65	4	1ª Reg.	4th	
1965–66	4	1ª Reg.	5th	
1966–67	4	1ª Reg.	6th	
1967–68	4	1ª Reg.	8th	
1968–69	4	1ª Reg.	12th	
1969–70	4	1ª Reg.	7th	
1970–71	4	1ª Reg.	11th	
1971–72	4	1ª Reg.	4th	
1972–73	4	1ª Reg.	5th	
1973–74	4	1ª Reg.	4th	
1974–75	4	Reg. Pref.	2nd	

Season	Tier	Division	Place	Copa del Rey
1975–76	4	Reg. Pref.	4th	
1976–77	4	Reg. Pref.	3rd	
1977–78	5	Reg. Pref.	3rd	
1978–79	5	Reg. Pref.	2nd	
1979–80	4	3ª	4th	First round
1980–81	4	3ª	12th	First round
1981–82	4	3ª	7th	
1982–83	4	3ª	6th	
1983–84	4	3ª	15th	First round
1984–85	4	3ª	3rd	
1985–86	4	3ª	16th	First round
1986–87	4	3ª	7th	
1987–88	4	3ª	3rd	
1988–89	4	3ª	2nd	
1989–90	4	3ª	5th	
1990–91	4	3ª	7th	First round
1991–92	4	3ª	6th	First round
1992–93	4	3ª	10th	Second round
1993–94	4	3ª	4th	
1994–95	4	3ª	10th	

Season	Tier	Division	Place	Copa del Rey
1995–96	4	3ª	6th	
1996–97	4	3ª	10th	
1997–98	4	3ª	4th	
1998–99	4	3ª	16th	
1999–2000	5	Reg. Pref.	3rd	
2000–01	4	3ª	15th	
2001–02	4	3ª	9th	
2002–03	4	3ª	6th	
2003–04	4	3ª	17th	
2004–05	4	3ª	10th	
2005–06	4	3ª	9th	
2006–07	4	3ª	8th	
2007–08	4	3ª	14th	
2008–09	4	3ª	8th	
2009–10	4	3ª	15th	
2010–11	4	3ª	17th	
2011–12	4	3ª	10th	
2012–13	4	3ª	5th	
2013–14	4	3ª	14th	
2014–15	4	3ª	9th	

Season	Tier	Division	Place	Copa del Rey
2015–16	4	3ª	6th	
2016–17	4	3ª	16th	
2017–18	4	3ª	20th	
2018–19	5	Reg. Pref.	5th	
2019–20	5	Reg. Pref.	2nd	
2020–21	4	3ª	7th / 2nd	
2021–22	5	3ª RFEF	11th	
2022–23	5	3ª Fed.	13th	
2023–24	5	3ª Fed.	13th	
2024–25	5	3ª Fed.	5th	
2025–26	5	3ª Fed.	11th	
2026–27	5	3ª Fed.		

- 39 seasons in Tercera División
- 6 seasons in Tercera Federación/Tercera División RFEF
