= CD Cayón =

Association football club in Spain

Coordinates: 43.320563°N 3.857061°W

Cayón
- Full name: Club Deportivo Cayón
- Founded: 1915
- Ground: Fernando Astobiza, Cayón, Cantabria, Spain
- Capacity: 2,700
- Chairman: Dionisio Humara
- Manager: Luis Fernández
- League: Tercera Federación – Group 3
- 2025–26: Tercera Federación – Group 3, 8th of 18
Home colours

Club Deportivo Cayón is a Spanish football club based in Santa María de Cayón, in the autonomous community of Cantabria. Founded in 1915, it plays in Tercera Federación – Group 3, holding home games at Estadio Fernando Astobiza, which has a capacity of 2,700 spectators.

== History ==
In the 2017–18 season the club finished 6th in the Tercera División, Group 3. The following season CD Cayón improved its position by finishing 4th.

== Season to season ==
Season	Tier	Division	Place	Copa del Rey
1948–49	5	2ª Reg.	1st	
1949–50	4	1ª Reg.	5th	
1950–51	4	1ª Reg.	2nd	
1951–52	4	1ª Reg.	4th	
1952–53	4	1ª Reg.	4th	
1953–54	4	1ª Reg.	9th	
1954–55	4	1ª Reg.	5th	
1955–56	5	2ª Reg.	1st	
1956–57	4	1ª Reg.	11th	
1957–58	5	2ª Reg.	2nd	
1958–59	4	1ª Reg.	11th	
1959–60	4	1ª Reg.	13th	
1960–61	4	1ª Reg.	10th	
1961–62	4	1ª Reg.	8th	
1962–63	4	1ª Reg.	11th	
1963–64	4	1ª Reg.	6th	
1964–65	4	1ª Reg.	2nd	
1965–66	4	1ª Reg.	6th	
1966–67	4	1ª Reg.	5th	
1967–68	5	2ª Reg.		

Season	Tier	Division	Place	Copa del Rey
1968–69	4	1ª Reg.	8th	
1969–70	4	1ª Reg.	6th	
1970–71	4	1ª Reg.	8th	
1971–72	4	1ª Reg.	13th	
1972–73	4	1ª Reg.	11th	
1973–74	4	1ª Reg.	13th	
1974–75	4	Reg. Pref.	6th	
1975–76	4	Reg. Pref.	6th	
1976–77	4	Reg. Pref.	13th	
1977–78	5	Reg. Pref.	1st	
1978–79	4	3ª	16th	
1979–80	4	3ª	19th	
1980–81	4	3ª	5th	
1981–82	4	3ª	12th	
1982–83	4	3ª	15th	First round
1983–84	4	3ª	15th	
1984–85	4	3ª	10th	
1985–86	5	Reg. Pref.	12th	
1986–87	4	3ª	13th	
1987–88	4	3ª	8th	

Season	Tier	Division	Place	Copa del Rey
1988–89	4	3ª	7th	
1989–90	4	3ª	14th	
1990–91	4	3ª	13th	First round
1991–92	4	3ª	20th	
1992–93	4	3ª	5th	
1993–94	4	3ª	10th	
1994–95	4	3ª	8th	
1995–96	4	3ª	7th	
1996–97	4	3ª	14th	
1997–98	4	3ª	5th	
1998–99	4	3ª	5th	
1999–2000	4	3ª	10th	
2000–01	4	3ª	8th	
2001–02	4	3ª	7th	
2002–03	4	3ª	14th	
2003–04	4	3ª	20th	
2004–05	5	Reg. Pref.	6th	
2005–06	5	Reg. Pref.	3rd	
2006–07	4	3ª	18th	
2007–08	5	Reg. Pref.	5th	

Season	Tier	Division	Place	Copa del Rey
2008–09	4	3ª	15th	
2009–10	4	3ª	9th	
2010–11	4	3ª	10th	
2011–12	4	3ª	4th	
2012–13	4	3ª	3rd	
2013–14	4	3ª	6th	
2014–15	4	3ª	4th	
2015–16	4	3ª	4th	
2016–17	4	3ª	4th	
2017–18	4	3ª	6th	
2018–19	4	3ª	4th	
2019–20	4	3ª	5th	
2020–21	4	3ª	1st / 1st	
2021–22	4	2ª RFEF	14th	First round
2022–23	5	3ª Fed.	1st	
2023–24	4	2ª Fed.	17th	Second round
2024–25	5	3ª Fed.	4th	
2025–26	5	3ª Fed.	8th	
2026–27	5	3ª Fed.		

- 2 seasons in Segunda Federación/Segunda División RFEF
- 39 seasons in Tercera División
- 4 seasons in Tercera Federación

== Players ==
=== Current squad ===
As of 2 February 2024

Note: Flags indicate national team as defined under FIFA eligibility rules; some limited exceptions apply. Players may hold more than one non-FIFA nationality.

No.	Pos.	Nation	Player
1	GK	ESP	Pablo Galnares
2	DF	ESP	Gabi Fernández
3	DF	ESP	Álvaro Díez
4	DF	ESP	Álvaro Mier
5	MF	JPN	Hitoshi Ishida
6	MF	ESP	David Sanz
7	MF	ESP	Carlos Cagigas
8	MF	ESP	Chili
9	FW	ESP	Pedro Méndez
10	MF	ESP	Marcos Sáez
11	FW	ESP	Jesús Villar

No.	Pos.	Nation	Player
13	GK	ESP	Mario Canales
14	MF	ESP	Javier Turrado
15	DF	ESP	Riki Fernández
16	MF	ESP	Edu Martínez
17	DF	ESP	Álvaro Santamariá (on loan from Deportivo Fabril)
18	FW	ESP	Héctor Alonso
19	DF	ESP	Alberto Montiel
20	FW	ESP	Dani Salas
21	DF	ESP	Fernando Resines
22	GK	ESP	Rafa Pedrero
