= Alberto Guitián =

Spanish footballer

Personal information
- Full name: Alberto Guitián Ceballos
- Date of birth: 29 July 1990 (age 36)
- Place of birth: Los Corrales de Buelna, Spain
- Height: 1.82 m (5 ft 11 1/2 in)
- Position: Centre-back

Team information
- Current team: Atlético Albericia
- Number: 6

Youth career
- 1995–2000: La Salle
- 2000–2004: Buelna
- 2004–2008: Racing Santander

Senior career*
| Years | Team | Apps | (Gls) |
| 2008–2013 | Racing Santander B | 92 | (6) |
| 2013–2015 | Sporting Gijón B | 58 | (4) |
| 2015–2016 | Sporting Gijón | 1 | (0) |
| 2016 | Real Zaragoza | 18 | (2) |
| 2016–2018 | Real Valladolid | 37 | (2) |
| 2018 | → Sporting Gijón (loan) | 6 | (0) |
| 2018–2021 | Real Zaragoza | 49 | (2) |
| 2021–2022 | Bolívar | 54 | (0) |
| 2023–2024 | Cultural Leonesa | 4 | (0) |
| 2024–2025 | Gimnástica de Torrelavega | 17 | (0) |
| 2025– | Atlético Albericia | 18 | (0) |

Managerial career
- 2025–: Racing de Santander U19 (assistant)
- * Club domestic league appearances and goals as of 21 February 2026

Alberto Guitián Ceballos (born 29 July 1990) is a Spanish footballer who plays for Tercera Federación club Atlético Albericia. Mainly a central defender, he can also play as a central midfielder.

== Club career ==
Born in Los Corrales de Buelna, Cantabria, Guitián finished his formation with Racing de Santander. He made his senior debuts with the reserves in the 2008–09 campaign, in Segunda División B.

On 2 September 2013 Guitián moved to another reserve team, Sporting de Gijón B also in the third level. On 17 July of the following year, after featuring regularly, he signed a new one-year deal.

On 10 July 2015 Guitián was promoted to the main squad, newly promoted to La Liga. He was also converted to a central defender during the team's pre-season.

Guitián made his professional debut on 2 December, starting in a 0–2 Copa del Rey away loss against Real Betis. Late in the month he made his top tier debut, playing the full 90 minutes in a defeat at SD Eibar for the same scoreline.

On 1 February 2016, Guitián rescinded his contract with the Asturians and moved to Segunda División side Real Zaragoza. He scored his first professional goal on 2 April, netting his team's only in a 1–2 away loss against Elche CF.

On 17 June 2016, Guitián signed a three-year deal with Real Valladolid, also in the second tier. On 31 January 2018, he was loaned to Sporting de Gijón until the end of the season.

On 10 December 2018, after playing only one competitive match for the first half of the campaign, Guitián signed a two-and-a-half-year contract with Zaragoza, after cutting ties with Valladolid. He left the Aragonese side on 28 January 2021, after terminating his contract.

Guitián moved abroad for the first time in his career on 29 January 2021, after signing a contract with Bolivian side Club Bolívar.

In the summer 2025, Guitián joined Atlético Albericia. Alongside his player career, during 2025 he also became assistant coach of Racing Santander's U19 team under head coach Sergio Matabuena.
