= Íñigo Sainz-Maza =

Spanish footballer

Personal information
- Full name: Íñigo Sainz-Maza Serna
- Date of birth: 16 June 1998 (age 28)
- Place of birth: Ampuero, Spain
- Height: 1.81 m (5 ft 11 in)
- Positions: Right-back; midfielder

Team information
- Current team: Racing Santander
- Number: 6

Youth career
- Racing Santander

Senior career*
Years	Team	Apps	(Gls)
2015–2018	Racing B	89	(7)
2017–	Racing Santander	153	(1)
- * Club domestic league appearances and goals as of 31 May 2026

Íñigo Sainz-Maza Serna (born 16 June 1998) is a Spanish professional footballer who plays as either a right-back or a midfielder for Racing de Santander.

== Career ==
Born in Ampuero, Cantabria, Sainz-Maza was a Racing de Santander youth graduate. He made his senior debut with the reserves on 21 February 2016, playing the last eight minutes in a 3–0 Tercera División away win over SD Gama.

Sainz-Maza scored his first senior goal on 21 October 2017, netting the opener in a 1–1 home draw against SD Solares-Medio Cudeyo. He made his first team debut on 19 May 2019, starting in a 2–2 home draw against UD Logroñés in the Segunda División B, as his club was already qualified to the play-offs.

On 20 August 2020, after Racing's relegation, Sainz-Maza signed his first professional contract with the club and was promoted to the main squad. He was a regular starter for the club during the 2021–22 campaign, scoring once and acting as team captain as his side achieved promotion back to Segunda División.

Sainz-Maza made his professional debut on 14 August 2022, starting in a 2–0 away loss against Villarreal CF B. Three days later, he renewed his contract until 2026.

== Career statistics ==
=== Club ===
As of match played 31 May 2026

Appearances and goals by club, season and competition
Club	Season	League			National Cup		Other		Total	
Club	Season	Division	Apps	Goals	Apps	Goals	Apps	Goals	Apps	Goals
Racing B	2015–16	Tercera División	1	0	—		—		1	0
Racing B	2016–17	Tercera División	4	0	—		—		4	0
Racing B	2017–18	Tercera División	30	2	—		—		30	2
Racing B	2018–19	Tercera División	33	4	—		—		33	4
Racing B	2019–20	Tercera División	21	1	—		1 (Note: Appearance(s) in Promotion Playoffs)	0	22	1
Racing B	Total		89	7	—		1	0	90	7
Racing Santander	2017–18	Segunda División B	0	0	—		—		0	0
Racing Santander	2018–19	Segunda División B	1	0	0	0	1	0	2	0
Racing Santander	2019–20	Segunda División	0	0	—		—		0	0
Racing Santander	2020–21	Segunda División B	18	0	1	0	5	0	24	0
Racing Santander	2021–22	Primera División RFEF	35	1	2	0	1	0	38	1
Racing Santander	2022–23	Segunda División	35	0	1	0	—		36	0
Racing Santander	2023–24	Segunda División	35	0	1	0	—		36	0
Racing Santander	2024–25	Segunda División	9	0	0	0	0	0	9	0
Racing Santander	2025–26	Segunda División	20	0	4	0	—		24	0
Racing Santander	Total		153	1	9	0	7	0	169	1
Career total			242	8	9	0	8	0	259	8

== Honours ==
Racing Santander

- Segunda División: 2025–26
