= Antonio Stelitano =

Italian footballer (born 1987)

Personal information
- Date of birth: October 22, 1987 (age 39)
- Place of birth: Messina, Italy
- Position: Defender

Team information
- Current team: S.S. Pennarossa
- Number: 3

Senior career*
Years	Team	Apps	(Gls)
–2006	A.C.R. Messina	0	(0)
2006–2007	A.S.D. Giarre Calcio 1946		
2007–2008	Associazione Calcio Palmanova		
2008–2009	Taurianovese		
2009–2010	A.S.D. Igea Virtus Barcellona	20	(1)
2011	Club Atlético Unión		
2012–2013	A.S.D. Cittanova Interpiana Calcio		
2013–2014	Parma Calcio 1913	0	(0)
2014	Moca FC→(loan)		
2014	Arsenal de Roatán		
2014–2015	SD Buelna		
2015	CS Baloteşti	10	(0)
2015	FC Jumilla	0	(0)
2015–2016	ACS Viitorul Caransebeș	16	(0)
2016	CS Baloteşti	12	(0)
2016–2017	CS Șoimii Pâncota	9	(0)
2017–2018	CDE Melistar	25	(0)
2018	FK Nevėžis	20	(0)
2019	Anduud City FC		
2019–2020	Sliema Wanderers F.C.	9	(0)
2020–2021	S.P. Tre Fiori	4	(0)
2021	Jarabacoa FC	?	(?)
2021	F.C. Messina	1	(0)
2022	Calcio Biancavilla 1990	15	(0)
2022–	S.S. Pennarossa	27	(0)
- * Club domestic league appearances and goals as of 25 June 2023

Antonio Stelitano (born 22 October 1987) is an Italian footballer who plays for S.S. Pennarossa in San Marino.

== Career ==
Stelitano started his senior career with A.C.R. Messina. In 2009, he signed for A.S.D. Igea Virtus Barcellona in the Italian Serie C, where he made twenty league appearances and scored one goal. After that, he played for Club Atlético Unión, A.S.D. Cittanova Interpiana Calcio, Parma Calcio 1913, Moca, SD Buelna, CS Baloteşti, CS Șoimii Pâncota, CDE Melistar, FK Nevėžis, Anduud City, and Sliema Wanderers, where he now plays.
