= Alberto Delgado (Spanish footballer) =

Spanish footballer (born 1991)

Personal information
- Full name: Alberto Delgado Quintana
- Date of birth: 4 June 1991 (age 35)
- Place of birth: Cabezón de la Sal, Spain
- Height: 1.78 m (5 ft 10 in)
- Position: Left back

Team information
- Current team: Barquereño

Youth career
- Racing Santander

Senior career*
Years	Team	Apps	(Gls)
2009–2011	Racing Santander B	16	(0)
2011–2014	Barakaldo	90	(3)
2014–2015	Amorebieta	28	(0)
2015–2016	Leioa	16	(0)
2016	Senica	16	(0)
2017	Real Avilés		
2017–2020	Cacereño	60	(11)
2020–2024	Gimnástica	90	(5)
2024–	Barquereño	6	(0)

International career
2007	Spain U16	3	(0)
- * Club domestic league appearances and goals as of 13 October 2024

Alberto Delgado Quintana (born 4 June 1991) is a Spanish footballer who plays for Barquereño as a left back.

== Club career ==
=== Spain ===
Born in Cabezón de la Sal, Cantabria, Delgado was a Racing Santander youth graduate. On 8 November 2009 he made his senior debut for the reserves, coming on as a half-time substitute in a 1–1 home draw against Vecindario in the Segunda División B championship. He only appeared in one further match, as the B-team suffered relegation.

Delgado subsequently represented Barakaldo CF, SD Amorebieta and SD Leioa, all in the third and fourth divisions.

=== Senica ===
On 14 July 2016, Delgado signed for Fortuna Liga club FK Senica. He made his professional debut three days later, starting in a 0–1 home loss against Slovan Bratislava.

He left the club in January 2017 for signing with Spanish fourth division club Real Avilés.
