= SD Barreda Balompié =

Coordinates: 43.374201°N 4.039392°W

Barreda
- Full name: Sociedad Deportiva Barreda Balompié
- Founded: 1917
- Ground: Solvay, Barreda, Torrelavega, Cantabria, Spain
- Capacity: 5,100
- Chairman: José Girón
- Manager: Alejandro Cayón
- League: Tercera Federación – Group 3
- 2023–24: Regional Preferente, 1st of 18 (champions)
Home colours	Away colours

Sociedad Deportiva Barreda Balompié is a football team based in Barreda, Torrelavega in the autonomous community of Cantabria. Founded in 1917, the team plays in Tercera Federación – Group 3. The club's home ground is Solvay, which has a capacity of 5,100 spectators.

== History ==
In the 2015–16 season the club won regional league Preferente Cantabria. In the 2018–19 season the club finished in the 12th position in the Tercera División, Group 3.

== Season to season ==
Season	Tier	Division	Place	Copa del Rey
1928–29	5	2ª Reg.	2nd	
1929–30	5	2ª Reg.	3rd	
1930–31	5	2ª Reg.	4th	
1931–32	5	2ª Reg.	6th	
1932–33	5	2ª Reg.	4th	
1933–34	5	2ª Reg.	3rd	
1934–35	5	2ª Reg.	2nd	
1935–36	4	1ª Reg.	1st	
1939–40	4	1ª Reg.	4th	
1940–41	4	1ª Reg.	3rd	
1941–42	3	1ª Reg.	3rd	
1942–43	3	1ª Reg.	2nd	
1943–44	3	3ª	7th	
1944–45	3	3ª	2nd	
1945–46	3	3ª	4th	
1946–47	3	3ª	5th	
1947–48	3	3ª	4th	
1948–49	3	3ª	9th	
1949–50	3	3ª	15th	
1950–51	4	1ª Reg.	3rd	

Season	Tier	Division	Place	Copa del Rey
1951–52	4	1ª Reg.	5th	
1952–53	4	1ª Reg.	3rd	
1953–54	4	1ª Reg.	4th	
1954–55	4	1ª Reg.	1st	
1955–56	4	1ª Reg.	7th	
1956–57	4	1ª Reg.	3rd	
1957–58	4	1ª Reg.	6th	
1958–59	4	1ª Reg.	1st	
1959–60	3	3ª	15th	
1960–61	4	1ª Reg.	7th	
1961–62	4	1ª Reg.	2nd	
1962–63	4	1ª Reg.	3rd	
1963–64	3	3ª	14th	
1964–65	4	1ª Reg.	1st	
1965–66	3	3ª	10th	
1966–67	3	3ª	15th	
1967–68	4	1ª Reg.	4th	
1968–69	4	1ª Reg.	4th	
1969–70	4	1ª Reg.	1st	
1970–71	3	3ª	17th	

Season	Tier	Division	Place	Copa del Rey
1971–72	4	1ª Reg.	9th	
1972–73	4	1ª Reg.	3rd	
1973–74	4	1ª Reg.	8th	
1974–75	4	Reg. Pref.	3rd	
1975–76	4	Reg. Pref.	7th	
1976–77	4	Reg. Pref.	4th	
1977–78	5	Reg. Pref.	11th	
1978–79	5	Reg. Pref.	10th	
1979–80	5	Reg. Pref.	2nd	
1980–81	4	3ª	17th	
1981–82	4	3ª	20th	
1982–83	5	Reg. Pref.	3rd	
1983–84	5	Reg. Pref.	1st	
1984–85	4	3ª	20th	
1985–86	5	Reg. Pref.	10th	
1986–87	4	3ª	15th	
1987–88	4	3ª	5th	
1988–89	4	3ª	14th	
1989–90	4	3ª	11th	
1990–91	4	3ª	12th	

Season	Tier	Division	Place	Copa del Rey
1991–92	4	3ª	14th	
1992–93	4	3ª	17th	
1993–94	4	3ª	8th	
1994–95	4	3ª	19th	
1995–96	5	Reg. Pref.	1st	
1996–97	4	3ª	8th	
1997–98	4	3ª	9th	
1998–99	4	3ª	7th	
1999–2000	4	3ª	7th	
2000–01	4	3ª	9th	
2001–02	4	3ª	10th	
2002–03	4	3ª	2nd	
2003–04	4	3ª	12th	
2004–05	4	3ª	3rd	
2005–06	4	3ª	17th	
2006–07	4	3ª	7th	
2007–08	4	3ª	16th	
2008–09	4	3ª	11th	
2009–10	4	3ª	18th	
2010–11	5	Reg. Pref.	1st	

Season	Tier	Division	Place	Copa del Rey
2012–13	4	3ª	9th	
2012–13	4	3ª	7th	
2013–14	4	3ª	16th	
2014–15	4	3ª	20th	
2015–16	5	Reg. Pref.	1st	
2016–17	4	3ª	8th	
2017–18	4	3ª	9th	
2018–19	4	3ª	12th	
2019–20	4	3ª	19th	
2020–21	4	3ª	10th / 4th	
2021–22	5	3ª RFEF	14th	
2022–23	6	Reg. Pref.	5th	
2023–24	6	Reg. Pref.	1st	
2024–25	5	3ª Fed.		

- 47 seasons in Tercera División
- 2 seasons in Tercera Federación/Tercera División RFEF
