= CD Atlético Mineros =

Association football club in Spain

Atlético Mineros
- Full name: Club Deportivo Atlético Mineros
- Founded: 12 October 2015; 11 years ago
- Ground: Pepín Cadelo, Puente San Miguel, Reocín, Cantabria, Spain
- Capacity: 4,000
- President: Félix Valderrama
- Manager: Marcos Valdes
- League: Tercera Federación – Group 3
- 2025–26: Regional Preferente, 3rd of 18 (promoted)
Home colours	Away colours

Club Deportivo Atlético Mineros is a football team based in Puente San Miguel, Reocín in the autonomous community of Cantabria. Founded in 2015, they play in Tercera Federación – Group 3, holding home matches at the Estadio Pepín Cadelo.

== History ==
Founded on 12 October 2015 as a replacement to dissolved SD Reocín, Atlético Mineros started playing in the following year, and achieved two consecutive promotions in their first two senior seasons. In April 2023, they achieved a first-ever promotion to Tercera Federación.

== Season to season ==
Season	Tier	Division	Place	Copa del Rey
2016–17	7	2ª Reg.	2nd	
2017–18	6	1ª Reg.	4th	
2018–19	5	Reg. Pref.	6th	
2019–20	5	Reg. Pref.	6th	
2020–21	5	Reg. Pref.	2nd	
2021–22	6	Reg. Pref.	6th	
2022–23	6	Reg. Pref.	1st	
2023–24	5	3ª Fed.	15th	
2024–25	5	3ª Fed.	14th	
2025–26	6	Reg. Pref.	3rd	
2026–27	5	3ª Fed.		

- 3 seasons in Tercera Federación
