= CD Naval =

Spanish football team

Naval
- Full name: Club Deportivo Naval Reinosa
- Founded: 1928
- Ground: San Francisco, Reinosa, Cantabria, Spain
- Capacity: 3,000
- Chairman: Juan Carlos García
- Manager: Álvaro González
- League: Tercera Federación – Group 3
- 2025–26: Regional Preferente, 1st of 18 (champions)
- Website: https://www.cdnaval.es/
Home colours	Away colours

Club Deportivo Naval Reinosa, simply known as Naval, is a Spanish football team based in Reinosa, in the autonomous community of Cantabria. Founded in 1928, it plays in Tercera Federación – Group 3, holding home matches at Campo de San Francisco.

== History ==
In the 2014–15 season the club managed to promote to Tercera División by finishing 3rd in the Preferente Cantabria category. In the 2018–19 season the club was relegated from Tercera División to the regional category Preferente Cantabria.

== Season to season ==
Season	Tier	Division	Place	Copa del Rey
1930–31	5	2ª Reg.	3rd	
1931–32	5	2ª Reg.	5th	
1932–33	5	2ª Reg.	2nd	
1933–34	4	1ª Reg.	2nd	
1934–35	4	1ª Reg.	2nd	
1935–36	4	1ª Reg.	4th	
1939–40	DNP			
1940–41	4	1ª Reg.	4th	
1941–42	3	1ª Reg.	6th	
1942–43	3	1ª Reg.	7th	
1943–44	4	1ª Reg.	4th	
1944–45	4	1ª Reg.	2nd	
1945–46	4	1ª Reg.	5th	
1946–47	4	1ª Reg.	1st	
1947–48	4	1ª Reg.	1st	
1948–49	4	1ª Reg.	2nd	
1949–50	3	3ª	7th	
1950–51	3	3ª	11th	
1951–52	4	1ª Reg.	3rd	
1952–53	4	1ª Reg.	7th	

Season	Tier	Division	Place	Copa del Rey
1953–54	4	1ª Reg.	6th	
1954–55	4	1ª Reg.	2nd	
1955–56	4	1ª Reg.	2nd	
1956–57	4	1ª Reg.	1st	
1957–58	3	3ª	9th	
1958–59	3	3ª	6th	
1959–60	3	3ª	9th	
1960–61	3	3ª	18th	
1961–62	4	1ª Reg.	1st	
1962–63	3	3ª	12th	
1963–64	3	3ª	16th	
1964–65	4	1ª Reg.	3rd	
1965–66	4	1ª Reg.	7th	
1966–67	4	1ª Reg.	2nd	
1967–68	4	1ª Reg.	5th	
1968–69	4	1ª Reg.	11th	
1969–70	4	1ª Reg.	4th	
1970–71	4	1ª Reg.	9th	
1971–72	4	1ª Reg.	6th	
1972–73	4	1ª Reg.	4th	

Season	Tier	Division	Place	Copa del Rey
1973–74	4	1ª Reg.	2nd	
1974–75	4	Reg. Pref.	4th	
1975–76	4	Reg. Pref.	1st	
1976–77	3	3ª	17th	First round
1977–78	4	3ª	15th	First round
1978–79	4	3ª	8th	First round
1979–80	4	3ª	14th	First round
1980–81	4	3ª	6th	
1981–82	4	3ª	11th	Second round
1982–83	4	3ª	17th	
1983–84	4	3ª	12th	
1984–85	4	3ª	14th	
1985–86	4	3ª	18th	
1986–87	4	3ª	12th	
1987–88	4	3ª	7th	
1988–89	4	3ª	9th	
1999–90	4	3ª	16th	
1990–91	4	3ª	11th	
1991–92	4	3ª	16th	
1992–93	4	3ª	16th	

Season	Tier	Division	Place	Copa del Rey
1993–94	4	3ª	17th	
1994–95	4	3ª	20th	
1995–96	5	Reg. Pref.	4th	
1996–97	4	3ª	4th	
1997–98	4	3ª	15th	
1998–99	4	3ª	9th	
1999–2000	4	3ª	13th	
2000–01	4	3ª	17th	
2001–02	5	Reg. Pref.	5th	
2002–03	4	3ª	20th	
2003–04	5	Reg. Pref.	11th	
2004–05	5	Reg. Pref.	13th	
2004–05	5	Reg. Pref.	16th	
2006–07	6	1ª Reg.	3rd	
2007–08	5	Reg. Pref.	17th	
2008–09	6	1ª Reg.	5th	
2009–10	6	1ª Reg.	2nd	
2010–11	5	Reg. Pref.	8th	
2011–12	5	Reg. Pref.	18th	
2012–13	6	1ª Reg.	6th	

Season	Tier	Division	Place	Copa del Rey
2013–14	6	1ª Reg.	2nd	
2014–15	5	Reg. Pref.	3rd	
2015–16	4	3ª	18th	
2016–17	5	Reg. Pref.	5th	
2017–18	5	Reg. Pref.	5th	
2018–19	4	3ª	19th	
2019–20	5	Reg. Pref.	10th	
2020–21	5	Reg. Pref.	1st	
2021–22	5	3ª RFEF	4th	
2022–23	5	3ª Fed.	7th	
2023–24	5	3ª Fed.	11th	
2024–25	5	3ª Fed.	16th	
2025–26	6	Reg. Pref.	1st	
2026–27	5	3ª Fed.		

- 35 seasons in Tercera División
- 5 seasons in Tercera Federación/Tercera División RFEF
