= Marina de Cudeyo CF =

Association football club in Spain

Marina de Cudeyo
- Full name: Marina de Cudeyo Club de Fútbol
- Founded: 1977
- Ground: Nuevo San Lázaro, Pedreña, Marina de Cudeyo, Cantabria, Spain
- Capacity: 800
- President: Pablo Copa
- Manager: Miguel Ángel Via
- League: Primera Regional
- 2024–25: Primera Regional, 11th of 18
Home colours	Away colours

Marina de Cudeyo Club de Fútbol is a Spanish football team located in Pedreña, Marina de Cudeyo, in the autonomous community of Cantabria. Founded in 1977, they currently play in Primera Regional, holding home matches at Campo de Fútbol Nuevo San Lázaro with a capacity of 800 people.

== History ==
Founded in 1977, Marina de Cudeyo played in the regional leagues until 1987, when a second consecutive promotion took them to Tercera División. The club played nine straight seasons in the category before their relegation in 1996, only returning to the division in 1999.

In 2001, one year after a relegation from division four, Marina de Cudeyo closed their senior team. Back for the 2003–04 season, the club spent another three seasons inactive afterwards before returning in 2007.

== Season to season ==
Season	Tier	Division	Place	Copa del Rey
1978–79	7	2ª Reg.	10th	
1979–80	7	2ª Reg.	1st	
1980–81	6	1ª Reg.	14th	
1981–82	6	1ª Reg.	11th	
1982–83	6	1ª Reg.	9th	
1983–84	6	1ª Reg.	5th	
1984–85	6	1ª Reg.	7th	
1985–86	6	1ª Reg.	2nd	
1986–87	5	Reg. Pref.	2nd	
1987–88	4	3ª	9th	
1988–89	4	3ª	13th	
1989–90	4	3ª	15th	
1990–91	4	3ª	8th	
1991–92	4	3ª	2nd	
1992–93	4	3ª	5th	First round
1993–94	4	3ª	14th	First round
1994–95	4	3ª	15th	
1995–96	4	3ª	18th	
1996–97	5	Reg. Pref.	16th	
1997–98	6	1ª Reg.	2nd	

Season	Tier	Division	Place	Copa del Rey
1998–99	5	Reg. Pref.	2nd	
1999–2000	4	3ª	19th	
2000–01	5	Reg. Pref.	13th	
2001–02	DNP			
2002–03	DNP			
2003–04	6	1ª Reg.	16th	
2004–05	DNP			
2005–06	DNP			
2006–07	DNP			
2007–08	7	2ª Reg.	13th	
2008–09	7	2ª Reg.	9th	
2009–10	7	2ª Reg.	15th	
2010–11	7	2ª Reg.	11th	
2011–12	7	2ª Reg.	2nd	
2012–13	6	1ª Reg.	13th	
2013–14	6	1ª Reg.	12th	
2014–15	6	1ª Reg.	12th	
2015–16	6	1ª Reg.	14th	
2016–17	6	1ª Reg.	8th	
2017–18	6	1ª Reg.	13th	

Season	Tier	Division	Place	Copa del Rey
2018–19	6	1ª Reg.	17th	
2019–20	7	2ª Reg.	6th	
2020–21	7	2ª Reg.	3rd	
2021–22	7	1ª Reg.	5th	
2022–23	7	1ª Reg.	10th	
2023–24	7	1ª Reg.	15th	
2024–25	7	1ª Reg.	11th	
2025–26	7	1ª Reg.		

- 10 seasons in Tercera División
