= SD Reocín =

Reocín
- Full name: Sociedad Deportiva Reocín
- Founded: 1964
- Dissolved: 2020
- Ground: Pepín Cadelo, Reocín, Cantabria, Spain
- Capacity: 4,000
- Chairman: (Spain) José Angel Peláez
- Manager: (Spain) Carlos Durán
- 2019–20: Primera Regional, 16th of 18 (relegated)
Home colours	Away colours

Sociedad Deportiva Reocín was a football team based in Reocín in the autonomous community of Cantabria. Founded in 1964, the team last played in Primera Regional. The club's home ground is Pepín Cadelo, which has a capacity of 4,000 spectators.

== History ==
The club retired from Tercera División on 11 December 2010 due to economic reasons.

== Season to season ==
Season	Tier	Division	Place	Copa del Rey
1964–65	4	1ª Reg.	16th	
1965–66	4	1ª Reg.	8th	
1966–67	4	1ª Reg.	6th	
1967–68	4	1ª Reg.	3rd	
1968–69	4	1ª Reg.	13th	
1969–70	4	1ª Reg.	9th	
1970–71	4	1ª Reg.	12th	
1971–72	4	1ª Reg.	16th	
1972–73	5	2ª Reg.	13th	
1973–74	5	2ª Reg.	10th	
1974–75	5	1ª Reg.	13th	
1975–76	5	1ª Reg.	6th	
1976–77	5	1ª Reg.	8th	
1977–78	6	1ª Reg.	6th	
1978–79	6	1ª Reg.	8th	
1979–80	6	1ª Reg.	19th	
1980–81	7	2ª Reg.	5th	
1981–82	7	2ª Reg.	4th	
1982–83	7	2ª Reg.	4th	
1983–84	6	1ª Reg.	11th	

Season	Tier	Division	Place	Copa del Rey
1984–85	6	1ª Reg.	1st	
1985–86	5	Reg. Pref.	6th	
1986–87	4	3ª	13th	
1987–88	4	3ª	6th	
1988–89	4	3ª	8th	
1989–90	4	3ª	17th	
1990–91	4	3ª	20th	
1991–92	5	Reg. Pref.	15th	
1992–93	5	Reg. Pref.	8th	
1993–94	5	Reg. Pref.	11th	
1994–95	5	Reg. Pref.	12th	
1995–96	5	Reg. Pref.	9th	
1996–97	5	Reg. Pref.	4th	
1997–98	4	3ª	20th	
1998–99	5	Reg. Pref.	11th	
1999–2000	5	Reg. Pref.	7th	
2000–01	5	Reg. Pref.	7th	
2001–02	5	Reg. Pref.	2nd	
2002–03	4	3ª	4th	
2003–04	4	3ª	7th	

Season	Tier	Division	Place	Copa del Rey
2004–05	4	3ª	9th	
2005–06	4	3ª	16th	
2006–07	4	3ª	16th	
2007–08	4	3ª	6th	
2008–09	4	3ª	6th	
2009–10	4	3ª	7th	
2010–11	4	3ª	(R)	
2011–12	5	Reg. Pref.	14th	

Season	Tier	Division	Place	Copa del Rey
2012–13	5	Reg. Pref.	16th	
2013–14	DNP			
2014–15	DNP			
2015–16	7	2ª Reg.	14th	
2016–17	7	2ª Reg.	3rd	
2017–18	6	1ª Reg.	8th	
2018–19	6	1ª Reg.	13th	
2019–20	6	1ª Reg.	16th	

- 14 seasons in Tercera División
