= Ayrón CF =

Spanish football team

Ayrón
- Full name: Ayrón Club de Fútbol
- Founded: 1917
- Ground: Municipal, Vargas, Puente Viesgo, Cantabria, Spain
- Capacity: 2,000
- President: Chemi
- Manager: Javier del Río
- League: Regional Preferente
- 2024–25: Regional Preferente, 7th of 18
Home colours	Away colours

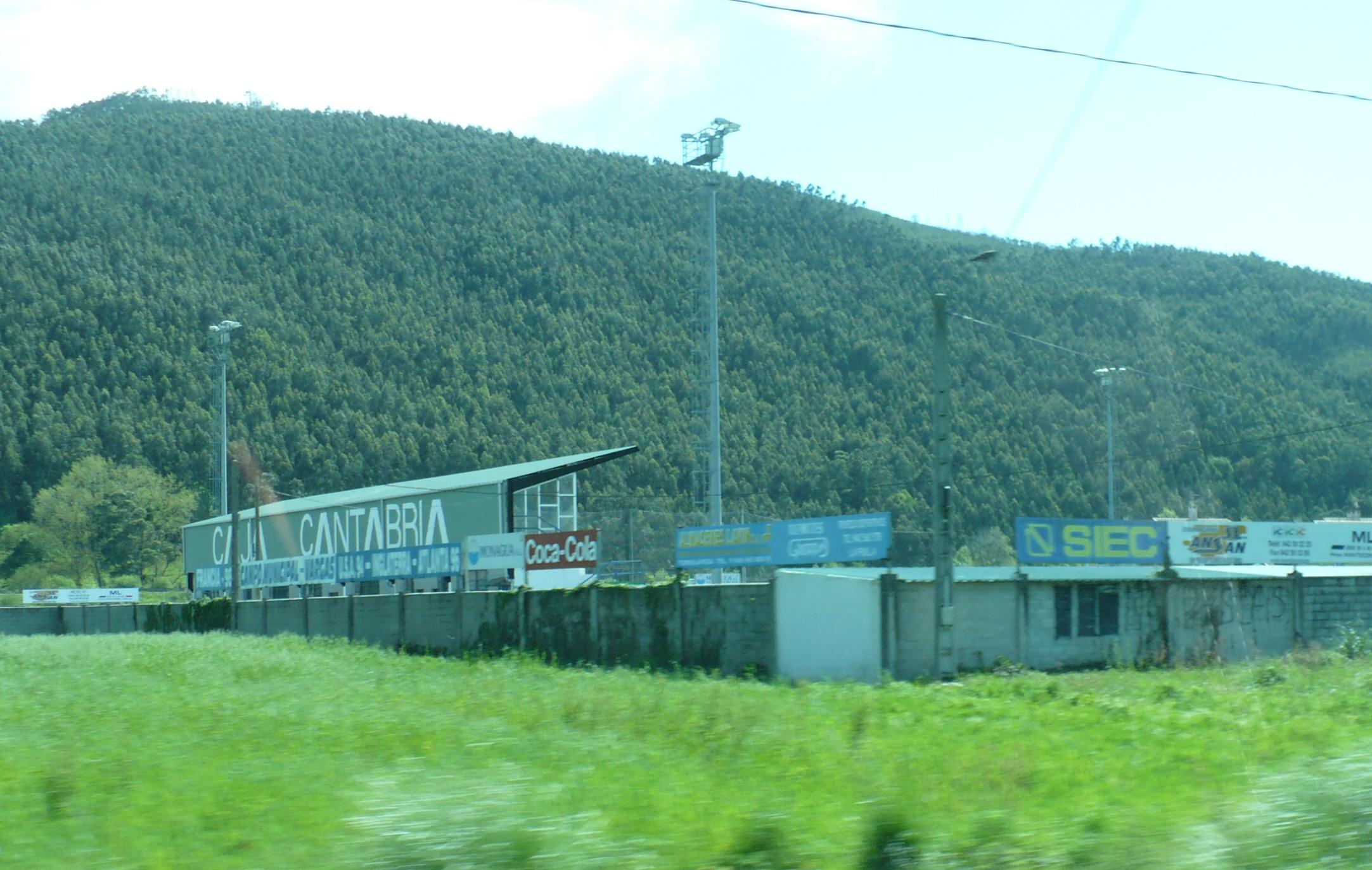
Campo de Futbol Municipal de Vargas in 2012

Ayrón Club de Fútbol (sometimes referred as Ayrón Club) is a football team based in Vargas, Puente Viesgo, in the autonomous community of Cantabria. Founded in 1917, the team plays in Regional Preferente, holding home matches at the Municipal de Frajanas, which has a capacity of 1,000 spectators.

== History ==
Founded in 1917 as Ayrón Club de Vargas by José Quintana Solórzano and another co-founder (sometimes cited as Aníbal Varillas Sainz Pardo), the club ceased activities in 1935. After short appearances in the 1940s, the club was refounded in 1966, returning to competition in the following year.

Ayrón achieved a first-ever promotion to Tercera División in 1986, and spent five consecutive seasons in the category (which also included a participation in the 1987–88 Copa del Rey) before suffering relegation in 1991. Between 1995 and 2002, the club played another five campaigns in the fourth division.

== Season to season ==
Season	Tier	Division	Place	Copa del Rey
1940–41	4	1ª Reg.	6th	
1941–1948	BNP			
1948–49	5	2ª Reg.	2nd	
1949–50	4	1ª Reg.	2nd	
1950–51	4	1ª Reg.	7th	
1951–52	5	3ª Reg.	1st	
1952–53	5	3ª Reg.	(R)	
1953–1967	BNP			
1967–68	4	1ª Reg.	10th	
1968–69	4	1ª Reg.	16th	
1969–70	5	2ª Reg.	7th	
1970–71	5	2ª Reg.	14th	
1971–72	6	3ª Reg.	3rd	
1972–73	6	3ª Reg.	1st	
1973–74	5	2ª Reg.	7th	
1974–75	5	1ª Reg.	11th	
1975–76	6	2ª Reg.	1st	
1976–77	5	1ª Reg.	18th	
1977–78	7	2ª Reg.	14th	
1978–79	7	2ª Reg.	2nd	

Season	Tier	Division	Place	Copa del Rey
1979–80	6	1ª Reg.	2nd	
1980–81	5	Reg. Pref.	10th	
1981–82	5	Reg. Pref.	15th	
1982–83	5	Reg. Pref.	16th	
1983–84	5	Reg. Pref.	8th	
1984–85	5	Reg. Pref.	2nd	
1985–86	5	Reg. Pref.	3rd	
1986–87	4	3ª	6th	
1987–88	4	3ª	15th	First round
1988–89	4	3ª	12th	
1989–90	4	3ª	10th	
1990–91	4	3ª	19th	
1991–92	5	Reg. Pref.	8th	
1992–93	5	Reg. Pref.	11th	
1993–94	5	Reg. Pref.	6th	
1994–95	5	Reg. Pref.	3rd	
1995–96	4	3ª	12th	
1996–97	4	3ª	18th	
1997–98	5	Reg. Pref.	2nd	
1998–99	4	3ª	19th	

Season	Tier	Division	Place	Copa del Rey
1999–2000	5	Reg. Pref.	1st	
2000–01	4	3ª	11th	
2001–02	4	3ª	19th	
2002–03	5	Reg. Pref.	7th	
2003–04	5	Reg. Pref.	12th	
2004–05	5	Reg. Pref.	9th	
2005–06	5	Reg. Pref.	5th	
2006–07	5	Reg. Pref.	12th	
2007–08	5	Reg. Pref.	9th	
2008–09	5	Reg. Pref.	10th	
2010–11	5	Reg. Pref.	7th	
2011–12	5	Reg. Pref.	15th	
2012–13	5	Reg. Pref.	15th	
2013–14	6	1ª Reg.	4th	
2014–15	6	1ª Reg.	4th	
2015–16	6	1ª Reg.	5th	
2016–17	6	1ª Reg.	3rd	
2017–18	5	Reg. Pref.	7th	
2018–19	5	Reg. Pref.	15th	

Season	Tier	Division	Place	Copa del Rey
2019–20	6	1ª Reg.	9th	
2020–21	6	1ª Reg.	2nd	
2021–22	6	Reg. Pref.	18th	
2022–23	7	1ª Reg.	7th	
2023–24	7	1ª Reg.	4th	
2024–25	6	Reg. Pref.	7th	
2025–26	6	Reg. Pref.		

- 10 seasons in Tercera División
