= AD Siete Villas =

Spanish football team

Coordinates: 43.459653°N 3.556429°W

Siete Villas
- Full name: Asociación Deportiva Siete Villas
- Founded: 1969
- Ground: San Pedro, Castillo, Arnuero, Cantabria, Spain
- Capacity: 500
- Chairman: José Luis Hoya
- Manager: Carlos Setién
- League: Regional Preferente
- 2025–26: Regional Preferente, 8th of 18
Home colours	Away colours

Asociación Deportiva Siete Villas is a football team based in Castillo, Arnuero in the autonomous community of Cantabria. Founded in 1930, the team plays in Regional Preferente. The club's home ground is San Pedro, which has a capacity of 500 spectators.

== History ==
Club crest used between 1969 and 1986

Founded in 1969, CD Siete Villas played in the regional leagues until 1986, when they ceased activities. The club returned in 1993, under the name of SD Siete Villas, before changing to current name in 1999.

In its first season in Tercera División (2003–04) the club finished 13th. The following season was slightly better as Siete Villas finished 12th.

=== Club background ===
- Club Deportivo Siete Villas (1969–1986)
- Sociedad Deportiva Siete Villas (1993–1999)
- Asociación Deportiva Siete Villas (1999–present)

== Season to season ==
Season	Tier	Division	Place	Copa del Rey
1969–70	5	2ª Reg.	10th	
1970–71	6	3ª Reg.	2nd	
1971–72	5	2ª Reg.	11th	
1972–73	6	3ª Reg.	6th	
1973–74	6	3ª Reg.	14th	
1974–75	6	2ª Reg.	13th	
1975–76	6	2ª Reg.	15th	
1976–77	6	2ª Reg.	14th	
1977–78	7	2ª Reg.	11th	
1978–79	7	2ª Reg.	3rd	
1979–80	6	1ª Reg.	8th	
1980–81	6	1ª Reg.	17th	
1981–82	6	1ª Reg.	12th	
1982–83	6	1ª Reg.	16th	
1983–84	6	1ª Reg.	20th	
1984–85	7	2ª Reg.	8th	
1985–86	6	1ª Reg.	11th	
1986–1993	DNP			
1993–94	6	1ª Reg.	19th	
1994–95	6	1ª Reg.	19th	

Season	Tier	Division	Place	Copa del Rey
1995–96	6	1ª Reg.	20th	
1996–97	6	1ª Reg.	19th	
1997–98	6	1ª Reg.	6th	
1998–99	6	1ª Reg.	6th	
1999–00	6	1ª Reg.	11th	
2000–01	6	1ª Reg.	4th	
2001–02	6	1ª Reg.	1st	
2002–03	5	Reg. Pref.	1st	
2003–04	4	3ª	13th	
2004–05	4	3ª	12th	
2005–06	4	3ª	14th	
2006–07	4	3ª	15th	
2007–08	4	3ª	13th	
2008–09	4	3ª	7th	
2009–10	4	3ª	8th	
2010–11	4	3ª	4th	
2011–12	4	3ª	7th	
2012–13	4	3ª	9th	
2013–14	4	3ª	5th	
2014–15	4	3ª	11th	

Season	Tier	Division	Place	Copa del Rey
2015–16	4	3ª	13th	
2016–17	4	3ª	6th	
2017–18	4	3ª	12th	
2018–19	4	3ª	13th	
2019–20	4	3ª	11th	
2020–21	4	3ª	3rd / 4th	
2021–22	5	3ª RFEF	9th	
2022–23	5	3ª Fed.	8th	
2023–24	5	3ª Fed.	13th	
2024–25	5	3ª Fed.	17th	
2025–26	6	Reg. Pref.	8th	
2026–27	6	Reg. Pref.		

- 18 seasons in Tercera División
- 4 seasons in Tercera Federación/Tercera División RFEF
