= CD Pontejos =

Spanish football club

Pontejos
- Full name: Club Deportivo Pontejos
- Founded: 1962
- Ground: Nuevo San Lázaro, Pontejos, Marina de Cudeyo, Cantabria, Spain
- Capacity: 800
- Chairman: (Spain) Valentín del Río
- Manager: (Spain) José Manuel Solana
- League: Segunda Regional – Group C
- 2024–25: Segunda Regional – Group B, 15th of 18
Home colours	Away colours

Club Deportivo Pontejos is a football team based in Pontejos, Marina de Cudeyo in the autonomous community of Cantabria. Founded in 1962, the team plays in Segunda Regional – Group C. The club's home ground is Nuevo San Lázaro, which has a capacity of 800 spectators.

== Season to season ==
Season	Tier	Division	Place	Copa del Rey
1965–66	4	1ª Reg.	13th	
1966–67	4	1ª Reg.	4th	
1967–68	4	1ª Reg.	6th	
1968–69	5	2ª Reg.	6th	
1969–70	5	2ª Reg.	7th	
1970–71	5	2ª Reg.	11th	
1971–72	5	2ª Reg.	10th	
1972–73	5	2ª Reg.	10th	
1973–74	5	2ª Reg.	13th	
1974–75	6	2ª Reg.	3rd	
1975–76	5	1ª Reg.	8th	
1976–77	5	1ª Reg.	12th	
1977–78	6	1ª Reg.	10th	
1978–79	6	1ª Reg.	14th	
1979–80	6	1ª Reg.	18th	
1980–81	7	2ª Reg.	1st	
1981–82	6	1ª Reg.	13th	
1982–83	6	1ª Reg.	6th	
1983–84	5	Reg. Pref.	18th	
1984–85	6	1ª Reg.	9th	

Season	Tier	Division	Place	Copa del Rey
1985–86	6	1ª Reg.	6th	
1986–87	5	Reg. Pref.	19th	
1987–88	5	Reg. Pref.	2nd	
1988–89	4	3ª	15th	
1989–90	4	3ª	9th	
1990–91	4	3ª	1st	
1991–92	4	3ª	5th	Second round
1992–93	4	3ª	11th	Second round
1993–94	4	3ª	10th	
1994–95	4	3ª	17th	
1995–96	4	3ª	19th	
1996–97	5	Reg. Pref.	7th	
1997–98	5	Reg. Pref.	4th	
1998–99	4	3ª	20th	
1999–2000	5	Reg. Pref.	10th	
2000–01	5	Reg. Pref.	1st	
2001–02	4	3ª	16th	
2002–03	4	3ª	11th	
2003–04	4	3ª	19th	
2004–05	5	Reg. Pref.	8th	

Season	Tier	Division	Place	Copa del Rey
2005–06	5	Reg. Pref.	15th	
2007–08	5	Reg. Pref.	7th	
2008–09	5	Reg. Pref.	4th	
2009–10	4	3ª	13th	
2010–11	4	3ª	12th	
2011–12	4	3ª	13th	
2012–13	4	3ª	15th	
2013–14	4	3ª	18th	
2014–15	5	Reg. Pref.	13th	
2015–16	5	Reg. Pref.	12th	
2016–2024	DNP			
2024–25	8	2ª Reg.	15th	
2025–26	8	2ª Reg.		

- 17 seasons in Tercera División
