= CD Arenas de Frajanas =

Spanish football team

Arenas de Frajanas
- Full name: Club Deportivo Arenas de Frajanas
- Founded: 1991
- Ground: Municipal de Frajanas, El Astillero, Cantabria, Spain
- Capacity: 1,000
- Chairman: (Spain) José A. García
- Manager: (Spain) Gundi
- League: Regional Preferente
- 2024–25: Regional Preferente, 10th of 18
Home colours	Away colours

Club Deportivo Arenas de Frajanas is a football team based in El Astillero in the autonomous community of Cantabria. Founded in 1991, the team plays in Regional Preferente. The club's home ground is Municipal de Frajanas, which has a capacity of 1,000 spectators.

== Season to season ==
Season	Tier	Division	Place	Copa del Rey
2007–08	7	2ª Reg.	2nd	
2008–09	6	1ª Reg.	3rd	
2009–10	5	Reg. Pref.	2nd	
2010–11	4	3ª	14th	
2011–12	4	3ª	20th	
2012–13	5	Reg. Pref.	11th	
2013–14	5	Reg. Pref.	2nd	
2014–15	4	3ª	18th	
2015–16	5	Reg. Pref.	13th	
2016–17	5	Reg. Pref.	16th	
2017–18	6	1ª Reg.	6th	
2018–19	6	1ª Reg.	4th	
2019–20	6	1ª Reg.	2nd	
2020–21	5	Reg. Pref.	4th	
2021–22	6	Reg. Pref.	13th	
2022–23	6	Reg. Pref.	12th	
2023–24	6	Reg. Pref.	10th	
2024–25	6	Reg. Pref.	10th	
2025–26	6	Reg. Pref.		

- 3 seasons in Tercera División
