= SD Atlético Albericia =

Association football club in Spain

Coordinates: 43.462373°N 3.848829°W

Atlético Albericia
- Full name: Sociedad Deportiva Atlético Albericia
- Nickname: Alberi
- Founded: 1974
- Ground: Juan Hormaechea, Santander, Cantabria, Spain
- Capacity: 1,000
- Chairman: Luis Carlos Velarde
- Manager: Abraham Pérez Martínez
- League: Tercera Federación – Group 3
- 2025–26: Tercera Federación – Group 3, 7th of 18
Home colours	Away colours

Sociedad Deportiva Atlético Albericia is a football team based in Santander in the autonomous community of Cantabria. Founded in 1974, the team plays in Tercera Federación – Group 3. The club's home ground is Juan Hormaechea, which has a capacity of 1,000 spectators.

== History ==
In the 2018–19 season the club finished 13th in the Tercera División, Group 3.

== Season to season ==
Season	Tier	Division	Place	Copa del Rey
1974–75	6	2ª Reg.	11th	
1975–76	6	2ª Reg.	9th	
1976–77	6	2ª Reg.	11th	
1977–78	7	2ª Reg.	1st	
1978–79	6	1ª Reg.	10th	
1979–80	6	1ª Reg.	5th	
1980–81	5	Reg. Pref.	7th	
1981–82	5	Reg. Pref.	4th	
1982–83	5	Reg. Pref.	4th	
1983–84	5	Reg. Pref.	4th	
1984–85	5	Reg. Pref.	4th	
1985–86	5	Reg. Pref.	7th	
1986–87	4	3ª	13th	
1987–88	4	3ª	10th	
1988–89	4	3ª	5th	
1989–90	5	Reg. Pref.	22nd	
1990–91	6	1ª Reg.	10th	
1991–92	6	1ª Reg.	7th	
1992–93	6	1ª Reg.	5th	
1993–94	6	1ª Reg.	1st	

Season	Tier	Division	Place	Copa del Rey
1994–95	5	Reg. Pref.	4th	
1995–96	5	Reg. Pref.	15th	
1996–97	5	Reg. Pref.	11th	
1997–98	5	Reg. Pref.	14th	
1998–99	5	Reg. Pref.	7th	
1999–2000	5	Reg. Pref.	5th	
2000–01	4	3ª	12th	
2001–02	4	3ª	15th	
2002–03	4	3ª	15th	
2003–04	4	3ª	10th	
2004–05	4	3ª	13th	
2005–06	4	3ª	8th	
2006–07	4	3ª	7th	
2007–08	4	3ª	14th	
2008–09	4	3ª	10th	
2009–10	4	3ª	11th	
2010–11	4	3ª	15th	
2011–12	4	3ª	16th	
2012–13	4	3ª	14th	
2013–14	4	3ª	9th	

Season	Tier	Division	Place	Copa del Rey
2014–15	4	3ª	8th	
2015–16	4	3ª	16th	
2016–17	4	3ª	13th	
2017–18	4	3ª	14th	
2018–19	4	3ª	14th	
2019–20	4	3ª	19th	
2020–21	4	3ª	6th / 6th	
2021–22	5	3ª RFEF	7th	
2022–23	5	3ª Fed.	5th	
2023–24	5	3ª Fed.	4th	
2024–25	5	3ª Fed.	3rd	
2025–26	5	3ª Fed.	7th	
2026–27	5	3ª Fed.		

- 24 seasons in Tercera División
- 6 seasons in Tercera Federación/Tercera División RFEF
