= CD Monte =

Spanish football club

Monte
- Full name: Club Deportivo Monte
- Founded: 1924
- Ground: Monte 1, Monte, Santander, Cantabria, Spain
- Capacity: 2,000
- President: Pedro Rodríguez García
- Manager: José Manuel Saldaña
- League: Regional Preferente
- 2025–26: Regional Preferente, 5th of 18
- Website: http://www.cdmonte.com/
Home colours	Away colours

Club Deportivo Monte is a football team based in Monte, Santander, in the autonomous community of Cantabria, Spain. Founded in 1924, the team plays in Regional Preferente, holding home matches in the first field of the Campos de Fútbol de Monte, which has a capacity of 2,000 people.

== Season to season ==
Season	Tier	Division	Place	Copa del Rey
1970–71	6	3ª Reg.	3rd	
1971–72	5	2ª Reg.	13th	
1972–73	5	2ª Reg.	9th	
1973–74	5	2ª Reg.	3rd	
1974–75	4	Reg. Pref.	18th	
1975–76	5	1ª Reg.	11th	
1976–77	5	1ª Reg.	1st	
1977–78	5	Reg. Pref.	17th	
1978–79	6	1ª Reg.	15th	
1979–80	6	1ª Reg.	11th	
1980–81	6	1ª Reg.	13th	
1981–82	6	1ª Reg.	4th	
1982–83	6	1ª Reg.	1st	
1983–84	5	Reg. Pref.	9th	
1984–85	5	Reg. Pref.	18th	
1985–86	6	1ª Reg.	10th	
1986–87	6	1ª Reg.	2nd	
1987–88	5	Reg. Pref.	18th	
1988–89	6	1ª Reg.	1st	
1989–90	5	Reg. Pref.	18th	

Season	Tier	Division	Place	Copa del Rey
1990–91	6	1ª Reg.	4th	
1991–92	6	1ª Reg.	8th	
1992–93	DNP			
1993–94	DNP			
1994–95	6	1ª Reg.	14th	
1995–96	6	1ª Reg.	7th	
1996–97	6	1ª Reg.	12th	
1997–98	6	1ª Reg.	5th	
1998–99	6	1ª Reg.	1st	
1999–2000	5	Reg. Pref.	8th	
2000–01	5	Reg. Pref.	8th	
2001–02	5	Reg. Pref.	17th	
2002–03	6	1ª Reg.	4th	
2003–04	6	1ª Reg.	13th	
2004–05	6	1ª Reg.	9th	
2005–06	6	1ª Reg.	15th	
2006–07	6	1ª Reg.	12th	
2007–08	6	1ª Reg.	7th	
2008–09	6	1ª Reg.	8th	
2009–10	6	1ª Reg.	6th	

Season	Tier	Division	Place	Copa del Rey
2010–11	6	1ª Reg.	10th	
2011–12	6	1ª Reg.	9th	
2012–13	6	1ª Reg.	7th	
2013–14	6	1ª Reg.	11th	
2014–15	6	1ª Reg.	6th	
2015–16	6	1ª Reg.	1st	
2016–17	5	Reg. Pref.	15th	
2017–18	5	Reg. Pref.	14th	
2018–19	5	Reg. Pref.	17th	
2019–20	6	1ª Reg.	12th	
2020–21	6	1ª Reg.	1st	
2021–22	6	Reg. Pref.	10th	
2022–23	6	Reg. Pref.	9th	
2023–24	6	Reg. Pref.	4th	Preliminary
2024–25	5	3ª Fed.	18th	
2025–26	6	Reg. Pref.	5th	
2026–27	6	Reg. Pref.		

- 1 season in Tercera Federación
