= Selaya FC =

Association football club in Spain

Coordinates: 43.218006°N 3.809770°W

- Full name: Selaya Fútbol Club
- Founded: 1931
- Ground: El Castañal, Selaya, Cantabria, Spain
- Capacity: 2,000
- Chairman: (Spain) Juan Ruiz
- Manager: (Spain) Justo Antonio Cuesta Vallejo
- League: Tercera Federación – Group 3
- 2025–26: Tercera Federación – Group 3, 12th of 18
Home colours	Away colours

Selaya Fútbol Club is a football team based in Selaya in the autonomous community of Cantabria. Founded in 1931, the team plays in Tercera Federación – Group 3. The club's home ground is El Castañal, which has a capacity of 2,000 spectators.

== Season to season ==
Season	Tier	Division	Place	Copa del Rey
1956–57	5	2ª Reg.	5th	
1957–58	5	2ª Reg.	9th	
1958–59	5	2ª Reg.	12th	
1959–60	5	2ª Reg.	2nd	
1960–61	4	1ª Reg.	15th	
1961–62	5	2ª Reg.	1st	
1962–63	DNP			
1963–64	4	1ª Reg.	14th	
1964–1970	DNP			
1970–71	6	3ª Reg.	12th	
1971–1980	DNP			
1980–81	7	2ª Reg.	7th	
1981–82	7	2ª Reg.	11th	
1982–83	7	2ª Reg.	5th	
1983–84	6	1ª Reg.	16th	
1984–85	6	1ª Reg.	5th	
1985–86	6	1ª Reg.	2nd	
1986–87	5	Reg. Pref.	5th	
1987–88	5	Reg. Pref.	5th	
1988–89	5	Reg. Pref.	2nd	

Season	Tier	Division	Place	Copa del Rey
1989–90	4	3ª	13th	
1990–91	4	3ª	6th	
1991–92	4	3ª	13th	Second round
1992–93	4	3ª	20th	
1993–94	5	Reg. Pref.	5th	
1994–95	5	Reg. Pref.	7th	
1995–96	5	Reg. Pref.	13th	
1996–97	5	Reg. Pref.	5th	
1997–98	5	Reg. Pref.	15th	
1998–99	5	Reg. Pref.	13th	
1999–2000	5	Reg. Pref.	14th	
2000–01	5	Reg. Pref.	18th	
2001–02	6	1ª Reg.	6th	
2002–03	6	1ª Reg.	1st	
2003–04	5	Reg. Pref.	16th	
2004–05	6	1ª Reg.	1st	
2005–06	5	Reg. Pref.	2nd	
2006–07	4	3ª	20th	
2007–08	5	Reg. Pref.	11th	
2008–09	5	Reg. Pref.	3rd	

Season	Tier	Division	Place	Copa del Rey
2009–10	4	3ª	17th	
2010–11	5	Reg. Pref.	12th	
2011–12	5	Reg. Pref.	8th	
2012–13	5	Reg. Pref.	2nd	
2013–14	4	3ª	15th	
2014–15	4	3ª	14th	
2015–16	4	3ª	17th	
2016–17	4	3ª	14th	
2017–18	4	3ª	18th	
2018–19	5	Reg. Pref.	3rd	
2019–20	4	3ª	14th	
2020–21	4	3ª	6th / 5th	
2021–22	5	3ª RFEF	16th	
2022–23	6	Reg. Pref.	7th	
2023–24	6	Reg. Pref.	5th	
2024–25	6	Reg. Pref.	1st	Preliminary
2025–26	5	3ª Fed.	12th	
2026–27	5	3ª Fed.		

- 13 seasons in Tercera División
- 3 seasons in Tercera Federación/Tercera División RFEF
