= SD Textil Escudo =

Association football club in Spain

Coordinates: 43.298929°N 4.236690°W

Textil Escudo
- Full name: Sociedad Deportiva Textil Escudo
- Founded: 1922
- Ground: Juan María Parés Serra, Cabezón de la Sal, Cantabria, Spain
- Capacity: 1,500
- Chairman: José Manuel Rivero
- Manager: Jose Pablo Lobeto Mijares
- League: Regional Preferente
- 2024–25: Regional Preferente, 5th of 18
Home colours	Away colours

Sociedad Deportiva Textil Escudo is a football team based in Cabezón de la Sal in the autonomous community of Cantabria. Founded in 1922, the team plays in the Regional Preferente. The club's home ground is Campo de Fútbol Juan María Parés Serra, which has a capacity of 1,500 spectators.

== History ==
=== Club background ===
- Escudo Football Club – (1922–1927)
- Stadium Football Club – (1927–1928)
- El Independiente Club de Fútbol – (1928–1949)
- Escudo Club de Fútbol – (1949–1962)
- Escudo Frente de Juventudes – (1962–1972)
- Textil Escudo Frente de Juventudes – (1972–1977)
- Sociedad Deportiva Textil Escudo – (1977–present)

== Season to season ==
Season	Tier	Division	Place	Copa del Rey
1949–50	5	2ª Reg.	3rd	
1950–51	5	3ª Reg.	6th	
1951–52	5	3ª Reg.	7th	
1952–53	5	3ª Reg.	2nd	
1953–54	5	3ª Reg.	3rd	
1954–55	5	2ª Reg.	4th	
1955–56	5	2ª Reg.	8th	
1956–57	5	2ª Reg.	3rd	
1957–58	5	2ª Reg.	11th	
1958–59	5	2ª Reg.	4th	
1959–60	4	1ª Reg.	5th	
1960–61	4	1ª Reg.	2nd	
1961–62	4	1ª Reg.	4th	
1962–63	4	1ª Reg.	6th	
1963–64	4	1ª Reg.	7th	
1964–65	4	1ª Reg.	6th	
1965–66	4	1ª Reg.	3rd	
1966–67	4	1ª Reg.	7th	
1967–68	4	1ª Reg.	6th	
1968–69	4	1ª Reg.	10th	

Season	Tier	Division	Place	Copa del Rey
1969–70	4	1ª Reg.	12th	
1970–71	4	1ª Reg.	10th	
1971–72	4	1ª Reg.	12th	
1972–73	4	1ª Reg.	13th	
1973–74	4	1ª Reg.	16th	
1974–75	5	1ª Reg.	9th	
1975–76	5	1ª Reg.	3rd	
1976–77	4	Reg. Pref.	18th	
1977–78	6	1ª Reg.	1st	
1978–79	5	Reg. Pref.	12th	
1979–80	5	Reg. Pref.	9th	
1980–81	5	Reg. Pref.	9th	
1981–82	5	Reg. Pref.	12th	
1982–83	5	Reg. Pref.	7th	
1983–84	5	Reg. Pref.	7th	
1984–85	5	Reg. Pref.	16th	
1985–86	5	Reg. Pref.	2nd	
1986–87	4	3ª	11th	
1987–88	4	3ª	18th	
1988–89	5	Reg. Pref.	4th	

Season	Tier	Division	Place	Copa del Rey
1989–90	5	Reg. Pref.	14th	
1990–91	5	Reg. Pref.	4th	
1991–92	5	Reg. Pref.	3rd	
1995–96	4	3ª	19th	
1993–94	5	Reg. Pref.	9th	
1994–95	5	Reg. Pref.	1st	
1995–96	4	3ª	9th	
1996–97	4	3ª	19th	
1997–98	5	Reg. Pref.	1st	
1998–99	4	3ª	8th	
1999–2000	4	3ª	15th	
2000–01	4	3ª	3rd	
2001–02	4	3ª	13th	
2002–03	4	3ª	13th	
2003–04	4	3ª	15th	
2004–05	4	3ª	18th	
2005–06	5	Reg. Pref.	4th	
2006–07	4	3ª	19th	
2007–08	5	Reg. Pref.	13th	
2008–09	5	Reg. Pref.	1st	

Season	Tier	Division	Place	Copa del Rey
2009–10	4	3ª	19th	
2010–11	5	Reg. Pref.	6th	
2011–12	5	Reg. Pref.	4th	
2012–13	4	3ª	18th	
2013–14	5	Reg. Pref.	3rd	
2014–15	4	3ª	6th	
2015–16	4	3ª	10th	
2016–17	4	3ª	11th	
2017–18	4	3ª	8th	
2018–19	4	3ª	10th	
2019–20	4	3ª	15th	
2020–21	4	3ª	5th / 3rd	
2021–22	5	3ª RFEF	12th	
2022–23	5	3ª Fed.	16th	
2023–24	6	Reg. Pref.	6th	
2024–25	6	Reg. Pref.	5th	
2025–26	6	Reg. Pref.		

- 22 seasons in Tercera División
- 2 seasons in Tercera Federación/Tercera División RFEF
