= CD Colindres =

Spanish football club

Colindres
- Full name: Club Deportivo Colindres
- Founded: 1922
- Ground: El Carmen, Colindres, Cantabria, Spain
- Capacity: 2,500
- Chairman: (Spain) José Miranda Píriz
- Manager: (Spain) Gonzalo Bustamante
- League: Tercera Federación – Group 3
- 2024–25: Tercera Federación – Group 3, 12th of 18
Home colours	Away colours

Club Deportivo Colindres is a Spanish football team based in Colindres, in the autonomous community of Cantabria. Founded in May 1922 it currently plays in Tercera Federación – Group 3, holding home games at Campo de Fútbol del Carmen, which has a capacity of 2,500 spectators.

== Season to season ==
Season	Tier	Division	Place	Copa del Rey
1967–68	4	1ª Reg.	12th	
1968–69	5	2ª Reg.	5th	
1969–70	5	2ª Reg.	1st	
1970–71	4	1ª Reg.	15th	
1971–72	5	2ª Reg.	15th	
1972–73	6	3ª Reg.	2nd	
1973–74	5	2ª Reg.	2nd	
1974–75	4	Reg. Pref.	12th	
1975–76	5	1ª Reg.	9th	
1976–77	5	1ª Reg.	4th	
1977–78	6	1ª Reg.	3rd	
1978–79	5	Reg. Pref.	20th	
1979–80	6	1ª Reg.	10th	
1980–81	6	1ª Reg.	16th	
1981–82	6	1ª Reg.	9th	
1982–83	6	1ª Reg.	14th	
1983–84	6	1ª Reg.	17th	
1984–85	6	1ª Reg.	17th	
1985–86	6	1ª Reg.	8th	
1986–87	6	1ª Reg.	8th	

Season	Tier	Division	Place	Copa del Rey
1987–88	6	1ª Reg.	2nd	
1988–89	5	Reg. Pref.	10th	
1989–90	5	Reg. Pref.	2nd	
1990–91	4	3ª	17th	
1991–92	4	3ª	11th	
1992–93	4	3ª	9th	
1993–94	4	3ª	12th	
1994–95	4	3ª	16th	
1995–96	4	3ª	20th	
1996–97	5	Reg. Pref.	18th	
1997–98	6	1ª Reg.	10th	
1998–99	6	1ª Reg.	17th	
1999–2000	6	1ª Reg.	3rd	
2000–01	5	Reg. Pref.	14th	
2001–02	5	Reg. Pref.	12th	
2002–03	5	Reg. Pref.	6th	
2003–04	5	Reg. Pref.	5th	
2004–05	5	Reg. Pref.	17th	
2005–06	6	1ª Reg.	12th	
2006–07	6	1ª Reg.	7th	

Season	Tier	Division	Place	Copa del Rey
2007–08	6	1ª Reg.	1st	
2008–09	5	Reg. Pref.	8th	
2009–10	5	Reg. Pref.	4th	
2010–11	5	Reg. Pref.	15th	
2011–12	5	Reg. Pref.	11th	
2012–13	5	Reg. Pref.	1st	
2013–14	4	3ª	13th	
2014–15	4	3ª	16th	
2015–16	4	3ª	12th	
2016–17	4	3ª	20th	
2017–18	5	Reg. Pref.	9th	
2018–19	5	Reg. Pref.	4th	
2019–20	5	Reg. Pref.	9th	
2020–21	5	Reg. Pref.	2nd	
2021–22	5	3ª RFEF	15th	
2022–23	6	Reg. Pref.	4th	
2023–24	5	3ª Fed.	12th	
2024–25	5	3ª Fed.	12th	
2025–26	5	3ª Fed.		

- 10 seasons in Tercera División
- 4 seasons in Tercera Federación/Tercera División RFEF

== Honours ==
- Regional Preferente: 2012–13
