= CD Revilla =

Association football club in Spain

Revilla
- Full name: Club Deportivo Revilla
- Founded: 1974
- Ground: El Crucero, Revilla, Camargo, Cantabria, Spain
- Capacity: 500
- Chairman: Juan Antonio Hernández
- Manager: José L. García García
- League: Tercera Federación – Group 3
- 2025–26: Tercera Federación – Group 3, 13th of 18
- Website: https://clubdeportivorevilla.es
Home colours	Away colours

Club Deportivo Revilla is a Spanish football team based in Revilla, Camargo, in the autonomous community of Cantabria. Founded in 1974 it currently plays in Tercera Federación – Group 3, holding home games at Campo de Fútbol El Crucero, which has a capacity of 600 spectators.

== History ==
Back in the spring of 1974, the need to have a soccer team in the town of Revilla began to be managed.

After several meetings, a management directive was formalized on 20 July 1974, chaired by Luis Fernández until the end of 1974. He was replaced by Enrique Herbosa, who was president as the new director until 30 June 1979, as it had been agreed vote as president every so often.

1974–75 season: It was the beginning of the soccer team participating in Segunda Regional with local players. In the second round managed to sign a good squad of players.

1975–76 season: Promoted to Primera Regional (nowadays Regional Preferente), also youth and children's teams were formed, mostly local kids from Revilla. Also bowling and athletics teams were made in collaboration with the direction of Revilla´s School. In athletics, cross tests were organized, with great participation of athletes and spectators success.

The soccer team started playing in the Cantabrian Football Federation's fields (Escobedo, Adarzo, San Justo), which was a cost for the club. This made the directive assume the primary need to have a field in the town. Finally the field was inaugurate on 2 October 1977 after a lot of work being done with the collaboration of all the town of Revilla.

1994–95 season: The club promoted to Tercera División for the first time with Iván Helguera in the team.

2013–14 season: Promoted to Tercera División by winning the Preferente Cantabria category.

2014–15 season: Got the best result in its history being seventh and in this way the club participated the autonomous phase of the Spanish Royal Federation Cup the following season.

2017–18 season: Promoted to Tercera División by winning the Preferente Cantabria category for third time.

2018–19 season: Due to the relegation of Gimnástica de Torrelavega from Segunda B to Tercera División the club was relegated to Regional Preferente.

== Season to season ==
Season	Tier	Division	Place	Copa del Rey
1974–75	6	2ª Reg.	9th	
1975–76	6	2ª Reg.	5th	
1976–77	5	1ª Reg.	16th	
1977–78	6	1ª Reg.	14th	
1978–79	6	1ª Reg.	20th	
1979–80	7	2ª Reg.	6th	
1980–81	6	1ª Reg.	8th	
1981–82	6	1ª Reg.	17th	
1982–83	6	1ª Reg.	4th	
1983–84	5	Reg. Pref.	20th	
1984–85	6	1ª Reg.	12th	
1985–86	6	1ª Reg.	6th	
1986–87	5	Reg. Pref.	10th	
1987–88	5	Reg. Pref.	17th	
1988–89	5	Reg. Pref.	16th	
1989–90	5	Reg. Pref.	10th	
1990–91	5	Reg. Pref.	17th	
1991–92	5	Reg. Pref.	11th	
1992–93	5	Reg. Pref.	5th	
1993–94	5	Reg. Pref.	8th	

Season	Tier	Division	Place	Copa del Rey
1994–95	5	Reg. Pref.	2nd	
1995–96	4	3ª	15th	
1996–97	4	3ª	13th	
1997–98	4	3ª	16th	
1998–99	4	3ª	10th	
1999–2000	4	3ª	12th	
2000–01	4	3ª	18th	
2001–02	5	Reg. Pref.	1st	
2002–03	4	3ª	19th	
2003–04	5	Reg. Pref.	4th	
2004–05	5	Reg. Pref.	2nd	
2005–06	4	3ª	19th	
2006–07	5	Reg. Pref.	5th	
2007–08	5	Reg. Pref.	14th	
2008–09	5	Reg. Pref.	7th	
2009–10	5	Reg. Pref.	11th	
2010–11	5	Reg. Pref.	13th	
2011–12	5	Reg. Pref.	10th	
2012–13	5	Reg. Pref.	7th	
2013–14	5	Reg. Pref.	1st	

Season	Tier	Division	Place	Copa del Rey
2014–15	4	3ª	7th	
2015–16	4	3ª	14th	
2016–17	4	3ª	18th	
2017–18	5	Reg. Pref.	1st	
2018–19	4	3ª	17th	
2019–20	5	Reg. Pref.	1st	
2020–21	4	3ª	8th	
2021–22	6	Reg. Pref.	2nd	
2022–23	5	3ª Fed.	10th	
2023–24	5	3ª Fed.	10th	
2024–25	5	3ª Fed.	11th	
2025–26	5	3ª Fed.	13th	
2026–27	5	3ª Fed.		

- 13 seasons in Tercera División
- 5 seasons in Tercera Federación

== Honours ==
Regional Preferente:

- Winners (4): 2001–02, 2013–14, 2017–18, 2019–20.
- Runners-up (3): 1994–95, 2004–05, 2021–22.

== Notable former players ==
- (Spain) Iván Helguera
