= SD Buelna =

Spanish football club

Buelna
- Full name: Sociedad Deportiva Buelna
- Founded: 1948
- Ground: Municipal, Los Corrales de Buelna, Cantabria, Spain
- Capacity: 5,500
- Chairman: (Spain) Manuel Concha
- Manager: (Spain) Miguel Ángel Ruiz
- League: Segunda Regional – Group A
- 2024–25: Segunda Regional – Group A, 16th of 18
Home colours	Away colours

Sociedad Deportiva Buelna is a football team based in Los Corrales de Buelna in the autonomous community of Cantabria. Founded in 1948, the team plays in Segunda Regional – Group A. The club's home ground is Estadio Municipal, which has a capacity of 5,500 spectators.

== Season to season ==
Season	Tier	Division	Place	Copa del Rey
1948–49	5	2ª Reg.	3rd	
1949–50	4	1ª Reg.	4th	
1950–51	4	1ª Reg.	4th	
1951–52	4	1ª Reg.	6th	
1952–53	4	1ª Reg.	3rd	
1953–54	4	1ª Reg.	5th	
1954–55	4	1ª Reg.	4th	
1955–56	4	1ª Reg.	3rd	
1956–57	4	1ª Reg.	8th	
1957–58	5	2ª Reg.	1st	
1958–59	4	1ª Reg.	4th	
1959–60	4	1ª Reg.	2nd	
1960–61	4	1ª Reg.	3rd	
1961–62	4	1ª Reg.	5th	
1962–63	4	1ª Reg.	5th	
1963–64	4	1ª Reg.	2nd	
1964–65	4	1ª Reg.	9th	
1965–66	4	1ª Reg.	2nd	
1966–67	4	1ª Reg.	1st	
1967–68	4	1ª Reg.	1st	

Season	Tier	Division	Place	Copa del Rey
1968–69	4	1ª Reg.	5th	
1969–70	4	1ª Reg.	10th	
1970–71	4	1ª Reg.	6th	
1971–72	4	1ª Reg.	7th	
1972–73	4	1ª Reg.	14th	
1973–74	4	1ª Reg.	14th	
1974–75	5	1ª Reg.	3rd	
1975–76	4	Reg. Pref.	11th	
1976–77	4	Reg. Pref.	9th	
1977–78	5	Reg. Pref.	9th	
1978–79	5	Reg. Pref.	18th	
1979–80	6	1ª Reg.	1st	
1980–81	5	Reg. Pref.	2nd	
1981–82	4	3ª	18th	
1982–83	5	Reg. Pref.	1st	
1983–84	4	3ª	20th	
1984–85	5	Reg. Pref.	13th	
1985–86	5	Reg. Pref.	11th	
1986–87	4	3ª	20th	
1987–88	5	Reg. Pref.	14th	

Season	Tier	Division	Place	Copa del Rey
1988–89	5	Reg. Pref.	20th	
1989–90	6	1ª Reg.	12th	
1990–91	6	1ª Reg.	1st	
1991–92	5	Reg. Pref.	19th	
1992–93	6	1ª Reg.	12th	
1993–94	6	1ª Reg.	10th	
1994–95	6	1ª Reg.	13th	
1995–96	6	1ª Reg.	4th	
1996–97	5	Reg. Pref.	13th	
1997–98	5	Reg. Pref.	18th	
1998–99	6	1ª Reg.	9th	
1999–2000	6	1ª Reg.	2nd	
2000–01	5	Reg. Pref.	12th	
2001–02	5	Reg. Pref.	14th	
2002–03	5	Reg. Pref.	17th	
2003–04	6	1ª Reg.	12th	
2004–05	6	1ª Reg.	1st	
2005–06	6	1ª Reg.	4th	
2006–07	5	Reg. Pref.	3rd	
2007–08	4	3ª	20th	

Season	Tier	Division	Place	Copa del Rey
2008–09	5	Reg. Pref.	2nd	
2009–10	4	3ª	14th	
2010–11	4	3ª	9th	
2011–12	4	3ª	18th	
2012–13	5	Reg. Pref.	3rd	
2013–14	4	3ª	10th	
2014–15	4	3ª	19th	
2015–16	5	Reg. Pref.	19th	
2016–17	6	1ª Reg.	5th	
2017–18	6	1ª Reg.	16th	
2018–19	7	2ª Reg.	6th	
2019–20	7	2ª Reg.	7th	
2020–21	7	2ª Reg.	7th	
2021–22	8	2ª Reg.	6th	
2022–23	8	2ª Reg.	1st	
2023–24	7	1ª Reg.	16th	
2024–25	8	2ª Reg.	16th	
2025–26	8	2ª Reg.		

- 9 seasons in Tercera División
