= SD Gama =

Spanish football club

Gama
- Full name: Sociedad Deportiva Gama
- Founded: 1971
- Ground: Santa María, Bárcena de Cicero, Cantabria, Spain
- Capacity: 500
- Chairman: (Spain) Raimundo Bra Ricondo
- Manager: (Spain) Óscar Escuredo
- League: Regional Preferente
- 2024–25: Tercera Federación – Group 3, 13th of 18 (relegated)
Home colours	Away colours

Sociedad Deportiva Gama is a Spanish football team based in Bárcena de Cicero, in the autonomous community of Cantabria. Founded in 1971 it currently plays in Regional Preferente, holding home games at Campo de Fútbol Santa María, which has a capacity of 800 spectators.

== Season to season ==
Season	Tier	Division	Place	Copa del Rey
1972–73	6	3ª Reg.	12th	
1973–74	6	3ª Reg.	9th	
1974–75	6	2ª Reg.	6th	
1975–76	6	2ª Reg.	7th	
1976–77	6	2ª Reg.	2nd	
1977–78	6	1ª Reg.	12th	
1978–79	6	1ª Reg.	3rd	
1979–80	5	Reg. Pref.	13th	
1980–81	5	Reg. Pref.	14th	
1981–82	5	Reg. Pref.	13th	
1982–83	5	Reg. Pref.	12th	
1983–84	5	Reg. Pref.	6th	
1984–85	5	Reg. Pref.	7th	
1985–86	5	Reg. Pref.	4th	
1986–87	4	3ª	18th	
1987–88	5	Reg. Pref.	1st	
1988–89	4	3ª	16th	
1989–90	4	3ª	20th	
1990–91	5	Reg. Pref.	13th	
1991–92	5	Reg. Pref.	5th	

Season	Tier	Division	Place	Copa del Rey
1992–93	5	Reg. Pref.	2nd	
1993–94	4	3ª	20th	
1994–95	5	Reg. Pref.	16th	
1995–96	6	1ª Reg.	6th	
1996–97	6	1ª Reg.	4th	
1997–98	5	Reg. Pref.	7th	
1998–99	5	Reg. Pref.	5th	
1999–2000	5	Reg. Pref.	12th	
2000–01	5	Reg. Pref.	4th	
2001–02	5	Reg. Pref.	7th	
2002–03	5	Reg. Pref.	11th	
2003–04	5	Reg. Pref.	7th	
2004–05	5	Reg. Pref.	1st	
2005–06	4	3ª	13th	
2006–07	4	3ª	14th	
2007–08	4	3ª	19th	
2008–09	5	Reg. Pref.	6th	
2009–10	5	Reg. Pref.	10th	
2010–11	5	Reg. Pref.	4th	
2011–12	5	Reg. Pref.	1st	

Season	Tier	Division	Place	Copa del Rey
2012–13	4	3ª	12th	
2013–14	4	3ª	7th	
2014–15	4	3ª	13th	
2015–16	4	3ª	19th	
2016–17	5	Reg. Pref.	12th	
2017–18	5	Reg. Pref.	11th	
2018–19	5	Reg. Pref.	7th	
2019–20	5	Reg. Pref.	11th	
2020–21	5	Reg. Pref.	6th	
2021–22	6	Reg. Pref.	3rd	
2022–23	5	3ª Fed.	15th	
2023–24	6	Reg. Pref.	2nd	
2024–25	5	3ª Fed.	13th	
2025–26	6	Reg. Pref.		

- 10 seasons in Tercera División
- 2 seasons in Tercera Federación

== Honours ==
- Regional Preferente: 1987–88, 2004–05, 2011–12
