= CD Barquereño =

Spanish football club

Barquereño
- Full name: Club Deportivo Barquereño
- Founded: 1957
- Ground: El Castañar, San Vicente de la Barquera, Cantabria, Spain
- Capacity: 3,500
- President: (Spain) Félix Vega
- Head coach: (Spain) Hilario Vega
- League: Tercera Federación – Group 3
- 2025–26: Tercera Federación – Group 3, 14th of 18
Home colours	Away colours

Club Deportivo Barquereño is a Spanish football team based in San Vicente de la Barquera, in the autonomous community of Cantabria. Founded in 1953, it plays in Tercera Federación – Group 3, holding home matches at Campo Municipal El Castañar, with a capacity of 3,500 people.

== Season to season ==
Season	Tier	Division	Place	Copa del Rey
1955–56	5	2ª Reg.	5th	
1956–57	4	1ª Reg.	8th	
1957–58	4	1ª Reg.	7th	
1958–59	4	1ª Reg.	9th	
1959–60	4	1ª Reg.	11th	
1960–61	4	1ª Reg.	11th	
1961–1965	DNP			
1965–66	4	1ª Reg.	17th	
1966–67	4	1ª Reg.	11th	
1967–1975	DNP			
1975–76	5	1ª Reg.	2nd	
1976–77	4	Reg. Pref.	11th	
1977–78	5	Reg. Pref.	10th	
1978–79	5	Reg. Pref.	11th	
1979–80	5	Reg. Pref.	20th	
1980–81	6	1ª Reg.	1st	
1981–82	5	Reg. Pref.	2nd	
1982–83	4	3ª	15th	
1983–84	4	3ª	14th	
1984–85	4	3ª	12th	

Season	Tier	Division	Place	Copa del rey
1985–86	4	3ª	20th	
1986–87	4	3ª	8th	
1987–88	4	3ª	19th	
1988–89	5	Reg. Pref.	1st	
1989–90	4	3ª	8th	
1990–91	4	3ª	3rd	
1991–92	4	3ª	18th	First round
1992–93	5	Reg. Pref.	5th	
1993–94	DNP			
1994–95	6	1ª Reg.	12th	
1995–96	6	1ª Reg.	2nd	
1996–97	5	Reg. Pref.	14th	
1997–98	5	Reg. Pref.	8th	
1998–99	5	Reg. Pref.	17th	
1999–2000	6	1ª Reg.	5th	
2000–01	6	1ª Reg.	2nd	
2001–02	6	1ª Reg.	3rd	
2002–03	5	Reg. Pref.	12th	
2003–04	5	Reg. Pref.	3rd	
2004–05	4	3ª	17th	

Season	Tier	Division	Place	Copa del rey
2005–06	4	3ª	20th	
2006–07	5	Reg. Pref.	10th	
2007–08	5	Reg. Pref.	16th	
2008–09	6	1ª Reg.	1st	
2009–10	5	Reg. Pref.	6th	
2010–11	5	Reg. Pref.	3rd	
2011–12	4	3ª	19th	
2012–13	5	Reg. Pref.	9th	
2013–14	5	Reg. Pref.	5th	
2014–15	5	Reg. Pref.	4th	
2015–16	5	Reg. Pref.	17th	
2016–17	6	1ª Reg.	7th	
2017–18	6	1ª Reg.	1st	
2018–19	5	Reg. Pref.	1st	
2019–20	4	3ª	9th	First round
2020–21	4	3ª	10th	
2021–22	6	Reg. Pref.	9th	
2022–23	6	Reg. Pref.	6th	
2023–24	6	Reg. Pref.	3rd	
2024–25	5	3ª Fed.	9th	
2025–26	5	3ª Fed.	14th	
2026–27	5	3ª Fed.		

- 14 seasons in Tercera División
- 3 seasons in Tercera Federación
