= Guarnizo =

Village in Cantabria, Spain

Coordinates: 43°24′N 3°50′W

Guarnizo is a village in the municipality of El Astillero (Real Astillero de Guarnizo) in Cantabria, Spain.

According to the INE it had a population of 4,463 in 2010.

== Economy ==
The area once supported shipbuilding. The Spanish Navy's ship of the line Princesa, later HMS Princess, was built in Guarnizo in 1730–1731. The municipality's name, El Astillero, reflects the shipbuilding industry as astillero is Spanish for "shipyard".

The modern Astilleros de Santander shipyard is located near the village, but it only performs repairs, conversion and upgrades.
