= SD Solares-Medio Cudeyo =

Association football club in Spain

Coordinates: 43.387807°N 3.732042°W

Solares
- Full name: Sociedad Deportiva Solares-Medio Cudeyo
- Founded: 1968
- Ground: La Estación, Solares, Medio Cudeyo, Cantabria, Spain
- Capacity: 1,500
- Chairman: Luis Antonio Cacicedo
- Manager: Carlos Cruz Sanchez
- League: Tercera Federación – Group 3
- 2025–26: Regional Preferente, 2nd of 18 (promoted)
Home colours	Away colours

Sociedad Deportiva Solares-Medio Cudeyo is a football team based in Solares, Medio Cudeyo in the autonomous community of Cantabria. Founded in 1968, the team plays in Tercera Federación – Group 3. The club plays its home games at La Estación, which has artificial turf, capacity of 1,500 spectators and a stadium bar.

== History ==
The club was founded in 1968 with the name of Solares Sociedad Deportiva. In 2014, after the takeover of the Municipal Football School of Medio Cudeyo, the club took the denomination of Sociedad Deportiva Solares-Medio Cudeyo. In the 2016–17 season the club won Preferente Cantabria and promoted to the Tercera División.

== Season to season ==
Season	Tier	Division	Place	Copa del Rey
1970–71	6	3ª Reg.	9th	
1971–72	6	3ª Reg.	2nd	
1972–73	5	2ª Reg.	1st	
1973–74	4	1ª Reg.	7th	
1974–75	4	Reg. Pref.	15th	
1975–76	5	1ª Reg.	3rd	
1976–77	4	Reg. Pref.	6th	
1977–78	5	Reg. Pref.	8th	
1978–79	5	Reg. Pref.	9th	
1979–80	5	Reg. Pref.	12th	
1980–81	5	Reg. Pref.	19th	
1981–82	7	2ª Reg.	5th	
1982–83	7	2ª Reg.	10th	
1983–84	6	1ª Reg.	15th	
1984–85	6	1ª Reg.	16th	
1985–86	6	1ª Reg.	3rd	
1986–87	5	Reg. Pref.	8th	
1987–88	5	Reg. Pref.	9th	
1988–89	5	Reg. Pref.	6th	
1989–90	5	Reg. Pref.	13th	

Season	Tier	Division	Place	Copa del Rey
1990–91	5	Reg. Pref.	5th	
1991–92	5	Reg. Pref.	14th	
1992–93	5	Reg. Pref.	13th	
1993–94	5	Reg. Pref.	17th	
1994–95	6	1ª Reg.	15th	
1995–96	6	1ª Reg.	18th	
1996–97	6	1ª Reg.	16th	
1997–98	6	1ª Reg.	8th	
1998–99	6	1ª Reg.	10th	
1999–2000	6	1ª Reg.	13th	
2000–01	6	1ª Reg.	7th	
2001–02	6	1ª Reg.	1st	
2002–03	5	Reg. Pref.	13th	
2003–04	5	Reg. Pref.	2nd	
2004–05	4	3ª	14th	
2005–06	4	3ª	10th	
2006–07	4	3ª	17th	
2007–08	5	Reg. Pref.	1st	
2008–09	4	3ª	16th	
2009–10	4	3ª	12th	

Season	Tier	Division	Place	Copa del Rey
2010–11	4	3ª	18th	
2011–12	5	Reg. Pref.	15th	
2012–13	6	1ª Reg.	1st	
2013–14	5	Reg. Pref.	15th	
2014–15	5	Reg. Pref.	15th	
2015–16	5	Reg. Pref.	4th	
2016–17	5	Reg. Pref.	3rd	
2017–18	4	3ª	17th	
2018–19	4	3ª	15th	
2019–20	4	3ª	16th	
2020–21	4	3ª	11th / 5th	
2021–22	6	Reg. Pref.	1st	First round
2022–23	5	3ª Fed.	14th	
2023–24	5	3ª Fed.	16th	
2024–25	6	Reg. Pref.	11th	
2025–26	6	Reg. Pref.	2nd	
2026–27	5	3ª Fed.		

- 10 seasons in Tercera División
- 3 seasons in Tercera Federación
