= El Astillero =

- Municipality
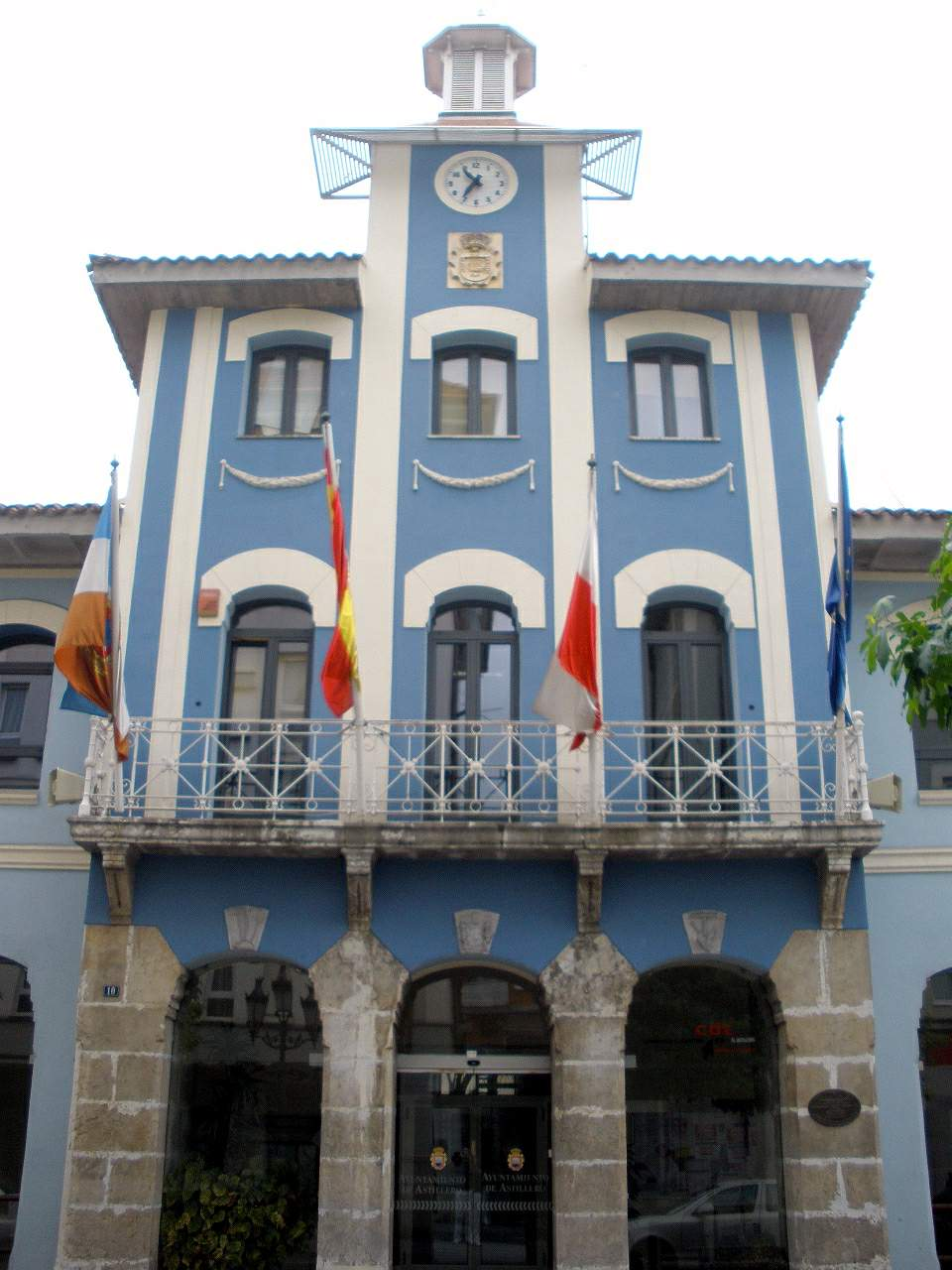
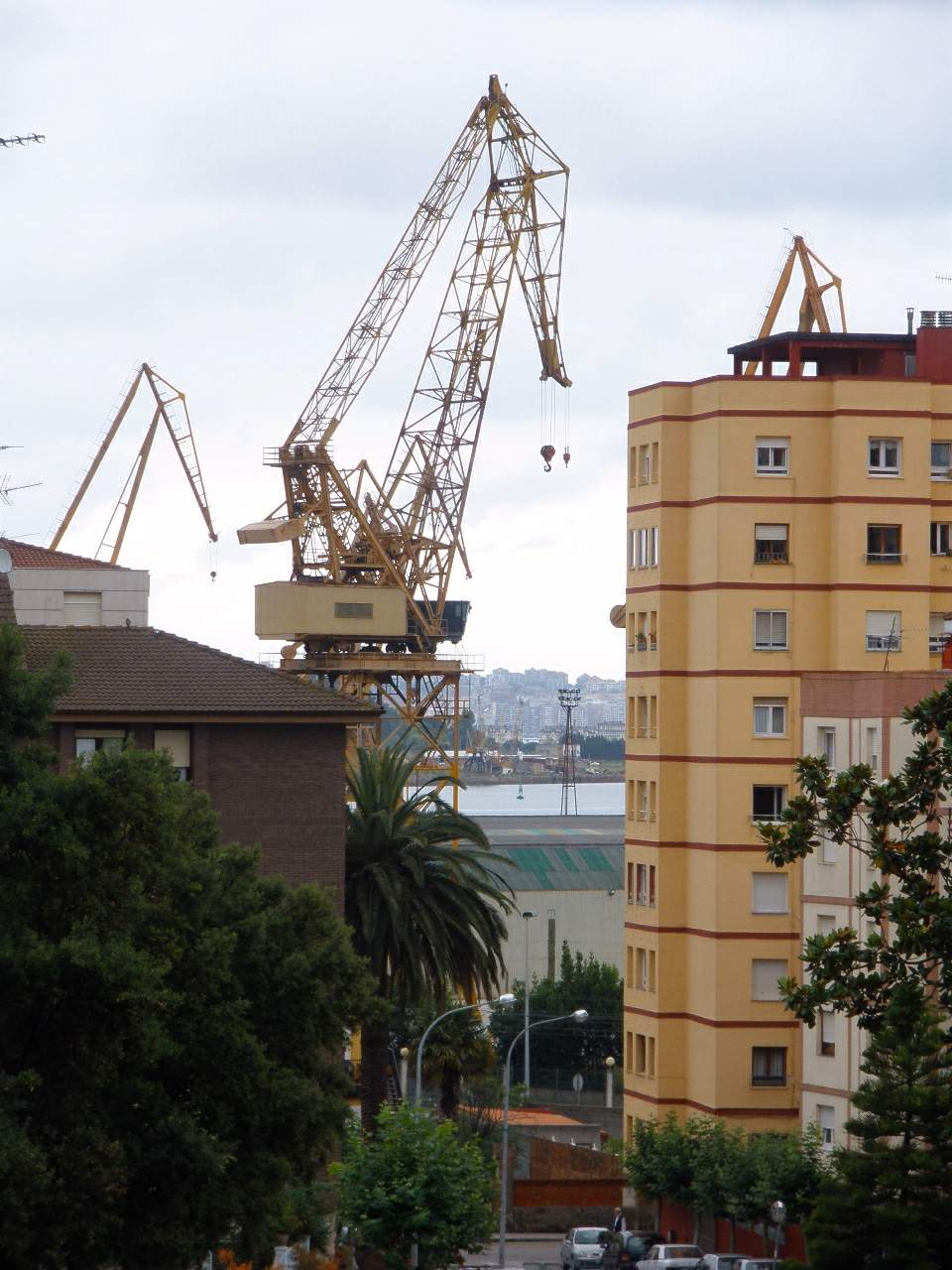
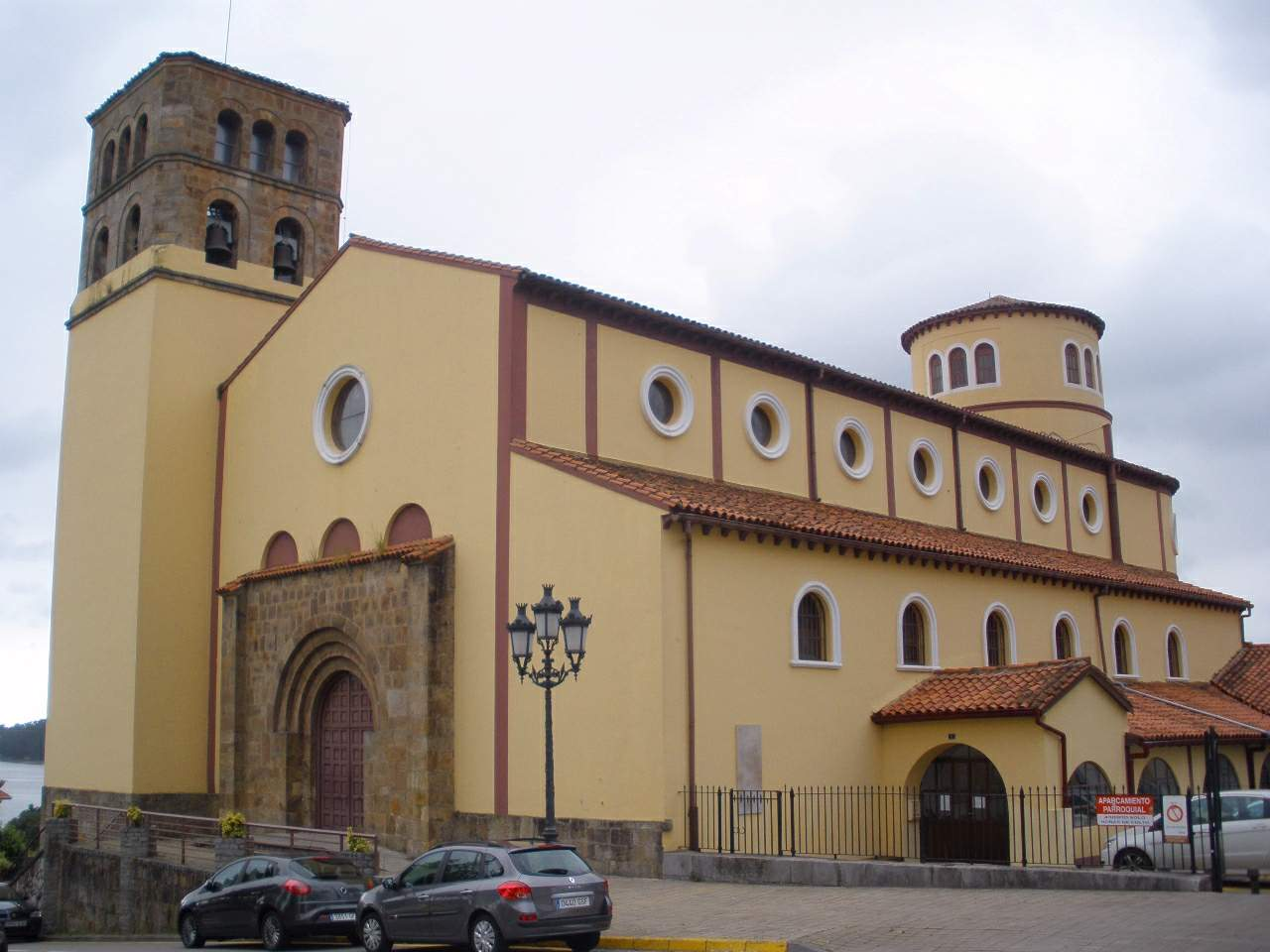
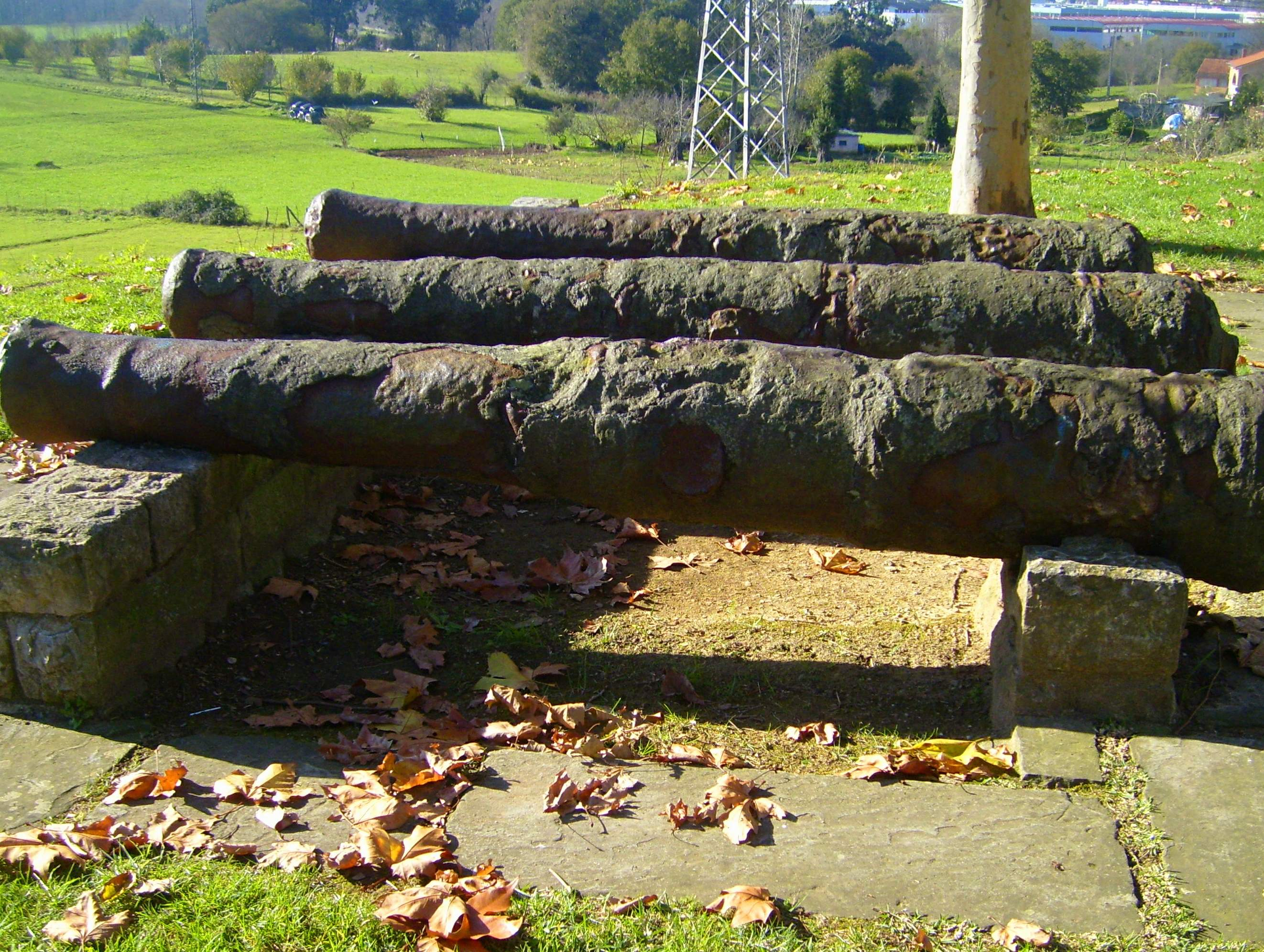
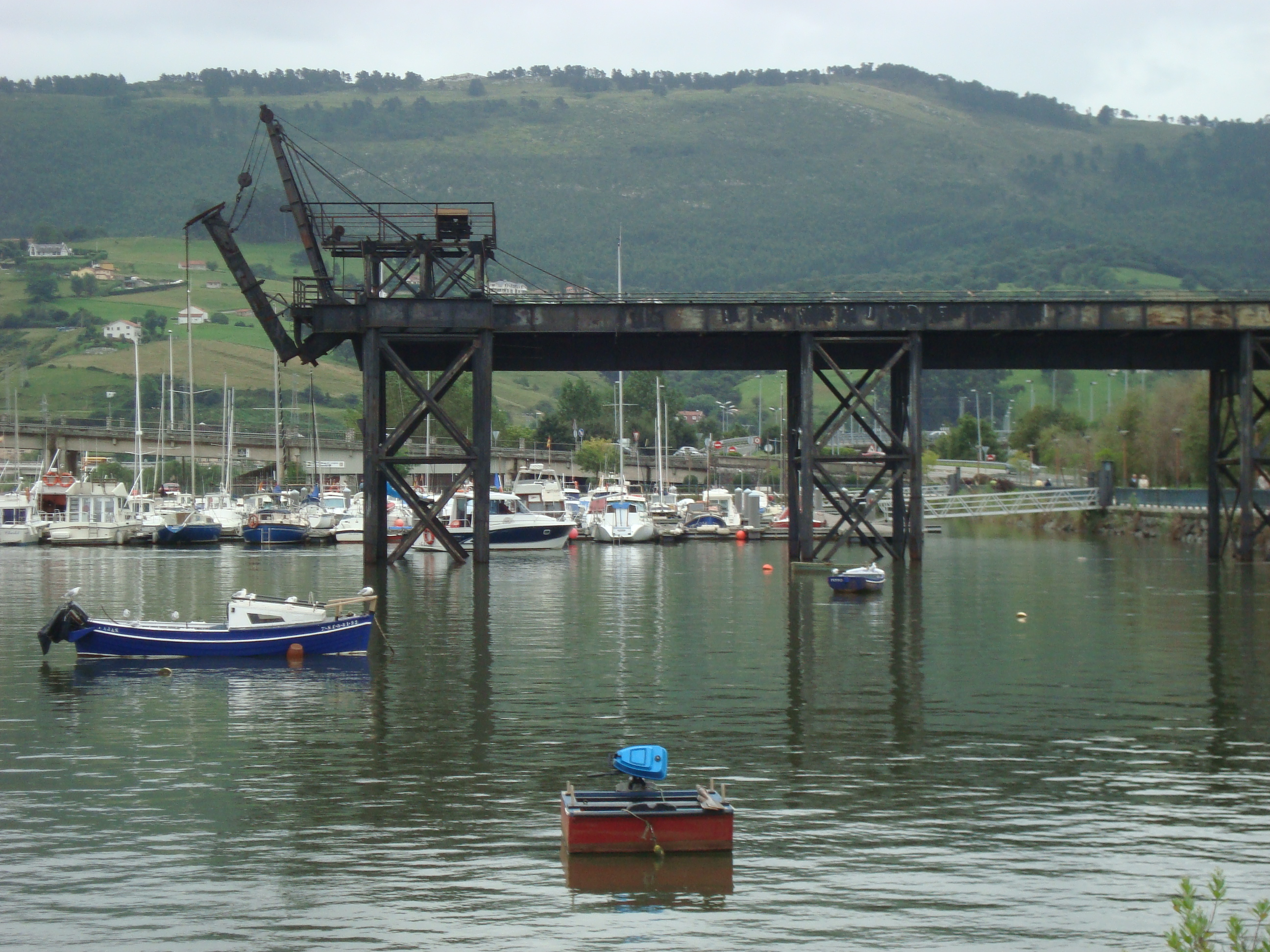
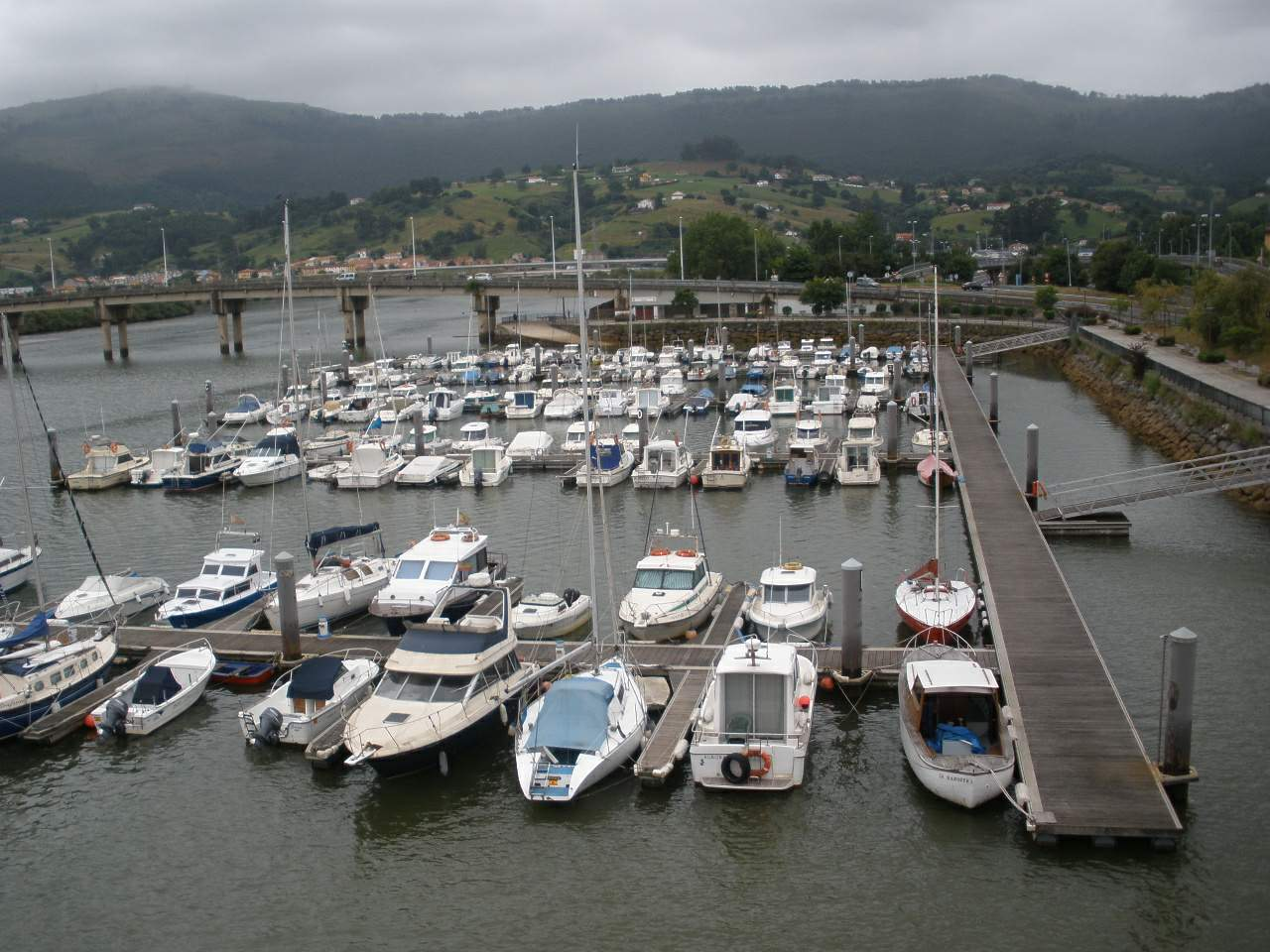
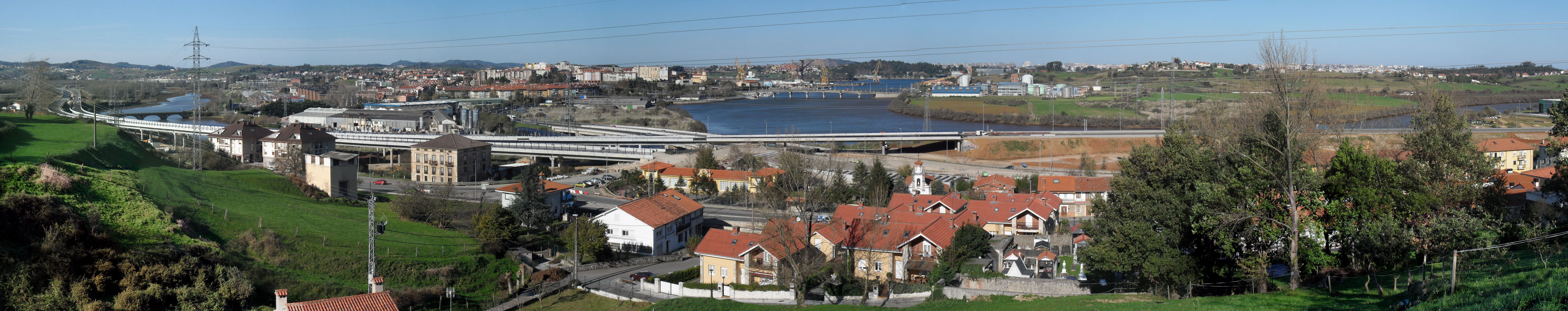

- Flag Coat of arms

- Location within Cantabria El Astillero (Spain)
- Coordinates: 43°24′6″N 3°49′10″W
- Country: Spain
- Autonomous community: Cantabria
- Province: Cantabria
- Comarca: Santander Bay
- Judicial district: Santander
- Capital: El Astillero

Government
  - Mayor: Javier Fernandez Soberon (Ciudadanos)

Area
  - Total: 6.83 km^{2} (2.64 sq mi)
- Elevation: 20 m (66 ft)

Population (2025-01-01)
  - Total: 18,448
  - Density: 2,700/km^{2} (7,000/sq mi)
- Demonym: Astillerenses
- Time zone: UTC+1 (CET)
  - Summer (DST): UTC+2 (CEST)
- Postal code: 39610
- Website: Official website

El Astillero (English: "The Shipyard") is a town and municipality in the province and autonomous community of Cantabria, northern Spain. It is near the provincial capital of Santander, and it is known for its shipyard, and for hosting of Spanish national Rowing Championships. Its location is geographically defined by the estuaries that surround it. It is located between the municipalities of Camargo (formerly part of El Astillero), Villaescusa, Piélagos, Medio Cudeyo and Marina de Cudeyo. Located at the foot of Peña Cabarga, is 7.5 kilometres away from the capital, Santander, and is 20 metres above sea level.

The confluence of the rivers and the coast of the bay is a large expanse of wetlands where various migratory birds nest throughout the year. The municipality covers an area of 6.80 km.

== Towns ==
- El Astillero (capital)
- Guarnizo

== Twin towns ==
- Chiclana de la Frontera, Spain
