= Divisiones Regionales de Fútbol in Cantabria =

The Divisiones Regionales de Fútbol in the Cantabria, are organized by the Cantabrian Football Federation:

- Regional Preferente (Level 6 of the Spanish football pyramid)
- Primera Regional (Level 7)
- Segunda Regional (Level 8)

== Regional Preferente de Cantabria ==
Preferente
- Founded: 1974
- Country: Spain
- Number of clubs: 18
- Level on pyramid: 6
- Promotion to: 3ª Federación - Group 3
- Relegation to: Primera Regional
- Domestic cup: None
- Website: Official website

The Regional Preferente de Cantabria is one of the lower levels of the Spanish Football League. It is held every year. It stands at the sixth level of Spanish football. All of the clubs are based in Cantabria.

=== The League ===
The league consists of one group of 18 teams. At the end of the season, the first, second and third are promoted to Tercera Federación - Group 3. The bottom three are relegated to the Primera Regional de Cantabria.

=== 2026–27 teams ===
Teams
CD Arenas de Frajanas
Club Atlético España de Cueto
Ayrón CF
SD Barreda Balompié
CD Colindres
SD Gama
CD Montañas del Pas
CD Monte
SD Noja
Polanco CF
CD Ramales
CDE Rayo Santa Cruz
CD Revilla B
SD San Martín de la Arena
AD Siete Villas
SD Solares-Medio Cudeyo
SD Textil Escudo
SD Villaescusa

=== Champions ===
Season	Winner
2009–10	CD Guarnizo
2010–11	SD Barreda Balompié
2011–12	SD Gama
2012–13	CD Colindres
2013–14	SD Revilla
2014–15	CD Guarnizo
2015–16	SD Barreda Balompié
2016–17	EMD Santillana
2017–18	SD Revilla
2018–19	CD Barquereño
2019–20	SD Revilla
2020–21	CD Naval
2021–22	SD Solares-Medio Cudeyo
2022–23	CDE Atlético Mineros
2023–24	SD Barreda Balompié
2024–25	Selaya FC
2025–26	CD Naval

== Primera Regional de Cantabria ==
1ª Regional
- Country: Spain
- Number of clubs: 18
- Level on pyramid: 7
- Promotion to: Preferente
- Relegation to: 2ª Regional
- Domestic cup: None
- Website: Official website

The Primera Regional de Cantabria is one of the lower levels of the Spanish Football League. It is held every year. It stands at the seventh level of Spanish football. All of the clubs are based in Cantabria.

=== The league ===
The league consists of one group of 18 teams. At the end of the season, the first three teams are promoted to the Regional Preferente de Cantabria league, and the last three are relegated to the Segunda Regional de Cantabria league.

=== 2022–23 teams ===
Teams
Cayón B
Ayrón Club
Peña Revilla
Marina de Cudeyo
Escobedo B
Atlético Mineros B
Naval B
Calasanz
Valle Lebaniego
Rinconeda Polanco
Club Atlético España de Cueto
Solares-Medio Cudeyo B
Miengo
Los Ríos
Santiago Galas
Ampuero
Río Gándara de Soba
Minerva

== Segunda Regional de Cantabria ==
2ª Regional
- Country: Spain
- Number of clubs: Variable
- Level on pyramid: 8
- Promotion to: 1ª Regional
- Domestic cup: None
- Website: Official website

The Segunda Regional de Cantabria is one of the lower levels of the Spanish Football League. It is held every year. It stands at the eighth level of Spanish football. All of the clubs are based in Cantabria.

=== The league ===
The league consists of one group of variable teams. At the end of the season three clubs are promoted to the Primera Regional de Cantabria league.
