= 1987–88 Tercera División =

Tercera División
- Season: 1987–88

The 1987–88 Tercera División season was the 11th edition since establishment of tier four.

== League table ==
=== Group 1 ===
Pos	Team	Pld	W	D	L	GF	GA	GD	Pts	Promotion or relegation
1	Racing Ferrol	38	25	8	5	61	23	+38	58	Promotion to the Segunda División B
2	Cambados	38	20	11	7	57	33	+24	51	
3	Lemos	38	19	12	7	51	26	+25	50	
4	Compostela	38	16	14	8	49	30	+19	46	
5	Barco	38	15	14	9	47	32	+15	44	
6	Fabril	38	17	9	12	63	40	+23	43	
7	Gondomar	38	16	10	12	49	37	+12	42	
8	Céltiga	38	13	13	12	35	40	−5	39	
9	Corujo	38	13	11	14	27	34	−7	37	
10	Boiro	38	11	15	12	44	48	−4	37	
11	Gran Peña	38	10	16	12	35	37	−2	36	
12	At. Orense	38	12	11	15	48	63	−15	35	
13	Alondras	38	13	8	17	50	55	−5	34	
14	Puebla	38	10	14	14	49	55	−6	34	
15	Vista Alegre	38	11	12	15	30	38	−8	34	
16	Sada	38	11	11	16	45	57	−12	33	
17	Tyde	38	12	9	17	33	53	−20	33	
18	Valladares	38	13	7	18	46	48	−2	33	Relegation
19	Portonovo	38	7	9	22	33	62	−29	23	Relegation
20	Flavia	38	4	10	24	32	73	−41	18	Relegation

=== Group 3 ===
1. Union Club de Astillero
2. Santoña
3. Castro
4. Vimenor

=== Group 4 ===
Pos	Team	Pld	W	D	L	GF	GA	GD	Pts	Promotion or relegation
1	Barakaldo	38	21	11	6	62	26	+36	53	Promotion to the Segunda División B
2	Aurrera KE	38	21	9	8	48	28	+20	51	
3	CD Hernani	38	20	10	8	54	39	+15	50	
4	Tolosa CF	38	17	14	7	48	25	+23	48	
5	Real Unión Club	38	17	13	8	48	26	+22	47	
6	Santurtzi	38	15	17	6	45	29	+16	47	
7	CD Mungia	38	16	13	9	48	35	+13	45	
8	Deportivo Alavés	38	18	7	13	49	35	+14	43	
9	SD Amorebieta	38	14	14	10	55	45	+10	42	
10	SD Gernika	38	15	10	13	45	41	+4	40	
11	Mondragón	38	11	13	14	48	56	−8	35	
12	Anaitasuna FT	38	11	12	15	38	49	−11	34	
13	Arenas de Getxo	38	10	13	15	42	50	−8	33	
14	Zalla	38	11	11	16	33	42	−9	33	
15	Pasajes	38	13	7	18	37	56	−19	33	
16	Galdakao	38	9	10	19	33	49	−16	28	
17	CD Touring	38	9	8	21	40	54	−14	26	
18	Portugalete	38	7	11	20	27	59	−32	25	Relegation
19	SD Erandio	38	6	12	20	31	55	−24	24	Relegation
20	Aretxabaleta	38	8	7	23	32	64	−32	23	Relegation

Source: https://www.besoccer.com/competition/table/tercera_division/1988/group4

=== Group 9 ===
Pos	Team	Pld	W	D	L	GF	GA	GD	Pts	Promotion or relegation
1	Real Jaén	42	29	3	10	91	27	+64	61	Promotion to the Segunda División B
2	At. Malagueño	42	23	10	9	100	45	+55	56	
3	Poli Ejido	42	22	10	10	63	39	+24	54	
4	Union Estepona	42	19	15	8	72	40	+32	53	
5	Ubeda CF	42	20	8	14	77	53	+24	48	
6	Athletic Coín	42	19	9	14	73	61	+12	47	
7	CD Mojácar	42	16	12	14	57	65	−8	44	
8	Mármol Macael	42	18	7	17	54	61	−7	43	
9	Martos CD	42	19	4	19	70	51	+19	42	
10	J. Torremolinos	42	17	8	17	54	62	−8	42	
11	UD San Pedro	42	15	11	16	55	57	−2	41	
12	Guadix CF	42	14	13	15	46	56	−10	41	
13	CD Antequerano	42	14	10	18	46	57	−11	38	
14	CD Los Boliches	41	15	8	18	60	67	−7	38	
15	At. Benamiel	42	16	6	20	54	66	−12	38	
16	CD Mijas	42	13	11	18	53	68	−15	37	
17	Atl. La Zubia	42	12	13	17	51	68	−17	37	
18	Villanueva CF	42	14	8	20	59	74	−15	36	
19	Roquetas Cadiz	42	13	10	19	48	71	−23	36	
20	Baza	41	13	8	20	43	72	−29	34	Relegation
21	Iliturgi CF	42	11	8	23	49	68	−19	30	Relegation
22	Vélez CF	42	6	14	22	39	86	−47	26	Relegation

Source: https://www.besoccer.com/competition/table/tercera_division/1988/group9

=== Group 16 ===
Pos	Team	Pld	W	D	L	GF	GA	GD	Pts	Promotion or relegation
1	CD Binéfar	38	29	6	3	100	36	+64	64	Promotion to the Segunda División B
2	Atlético Monzón	38	20	9	9	64	44	+20	49	
3	Barbastro	38	20	9	9	78	38	+40	49	
4	Alcañiz	38	20	8	10	61	44	+17	48	
5	Sabiñánigo	37	20	8	9	92	51	+41	48	
6	At. Calatayud	38	20	7	11	65	49	+16	47	
7	Huesca	38	20	5	13	69	40	+29	45	
8	Ejea	38	16	11	11	56	44	+12	43	
9	Sariñena	38	14	13	11	56	50	+6	41	
10	Illueca	38	16	8	14	64	49	+15	40	
11	Caspe	38	15	10	13	61	46	+15	40	
12	Alcorisa	38	17	5	16	60	62	−2	39	
13	CD Utrillas	38	11	11	16	48	55	−7	33	
14	Hernán Cortés	38	11	9	18	55	72	−17	31	
15	Peralta	38	10	9	19	53	81	−28	29	
16	Mallén	38	10	9	19	37	68	−31	29	
17	Jacetano	38	7	12	19	37	63	−26	26	
18	CD La Almunia	38	7	7	24	35	86	−51	21	Relegation
19	CD Mequinenza	38	6	7	25	44	103	−59	19	Relegation
20	Estadilla CD	37	3	11	23	26	80	−54	17	Relegation

Source: https://www.besoccer.com/competition/table/tercera_division/1988/group16
