= CF Calella =

Spanish football team

Calella
- Full name: Club de Fútbol Calella
- Founded: 1917; 109 years ago
- Ground: Complex Esportiu Tomás Claramunt, Calella, Catalonia, Spain
- Capacity: 1,000
- President: David García Martínez
- Head coach: Víctor Barragán
- League: Quarta Catalana – Group 12
- 2024–25: Tercera Catalana – Group 6, 13th of 16 (relegated)
- Website: www.cfcalella.com
Home colours	Away colours

Club de Fútbol Calella is a Spanish football team based in Calella, in Catalonia. Founded in 1917, they play in Quarta Catalana – Group 12, holding home matches at the Complex Esportiu Tomás Claramunt.

== Season to season ==
Season	Tier	Division	Place	Copa del Rey
1940–41	5	1ª Reg. B	9th	
1941–42	4	1ª Reg. B	8th	
1942–43	DNP			
1943–44	DNP			
1944–45	DNP			
1945–46	6	2ª Reg. P.	1st	
1946–47	6	3ª Reg.	7th	
1947–48	6	2ª Reg.	4th	
1948–49	5	1ª Reg. B	2nd	
1949–50	5	1ª Reg. B	2nd	
1950–51	4	1ª Reg. A	5th	
1951–52	4	1ª Reg. A	8th	
1952–53	4	1ª Reg. A	13th	
1953–54	4	1ª Reg.	16th	
1954–55	4	1ª Reg.	7th	
1955–56	4	1ª Reg.	8th	
1956–57	3	3ª	14th	
1957–58	3	3ª	15th	
1958–59	4	1ª Reg.	14th	
1959–60	4	1ª Reg.	18th	

Season	Tier	Division	Place	Copa del Rey
1960–61	4	1ª Reg.	13th	
1961–62	4	1ª Reg.	1st	
1962–63	3	3ª	8th	
1963–64	3	3ª	9th	
1964–65	3	3ª	6th	
1965–66	3	3ª	14th	
1966–67	3	3ª	18th	
1967–68	3	3ª	4th	
1968–69	3	3ª	3rd	
1969–70	3	3ª	6th	Fourth round
1970–71	3	3ª	7th	Round of 32
1971–72	3	3ª	9th	Third round
1972–73	3	3ª	3rd	Third round
1973–74	3	3ª	14th	Fourth round
1974–75	3	3ª	14th	First round
1975–76	3	3ª	20th	
1976–77	4	Reg. Pref.	19th	
1977–78	6	1ª Reg.	14th	
1978–79	6	1ª Reg.	10th	
1979–80	6	1ª Reg.	6th	

Season	Tier	Division	Place	Copa del Rey
1980–81	6	1ª Reg.	13th	
1981–82	6	1ª Reg.	4th	
1982–83	6	1ª Reg.	10th	
1983–84	6	1ª Reg.	15th	
1984–85	6	1ª Reg.	11th	
1985–86	6	1ª Reg.	2nd	
1986–87	6	1ª Reg.	2nd	
1987–88	5	Reg. Pref.	2nd	
1988–89	4	3ª	22nd	
1989–90	5	Reg. Pref.	12th	
1990–91	5	Reg. Pref.	12th	
1991–92	6	Pref. Terr.	5th	
1992–93	6	Pref. Terr.	4th	
1993–94	6	Pref. Terr.	18th	
1994–95	7	1ª Terr.	16th	
1995–96	8	2ª Terr.	3rd	
1996–97	8	2ª Terr.	3rd	
1997–98	8	2ª Terr.	1st	
1998–99	7	1ª Terr.	14th	
1999–2000	8	2ª Terr.	2nd	

Season	Tier	Division	Place	Copa del Rey
2000–01	8	2ª Terr.	4th	
2001–02	8	2ª Terr.	1st	
2002–03	7	1ª Terr.	5th	
2003–04	7	1ª Terr.	2nd	
2004–05	7	1ª Terr.	3rd	
2005–06	7	1ª Terr.	6th	
2006–07	7	1ª Terr.	6th	
2007–08	7	1ª Terr.	12th	
2008–09	7	1ª Terr.	17th	
2009–10	8	2ª Terr.	10th	
2010–11	8	2ª Terr.	13th	
2011–12	7	3ª Cat.	15th	
2012–13	7	3ª Cat.	15th	
2013–14	7	3ª Cat.	17th	
2014–15	DNP			
2015–16	DNP			
2016–17	8	4ª Cat.	1st	
2017–18	7	3ª Cat.	16th	
2018–19	8	4ª Cat.	1st	
2019–20	7	3ª Cat.	9th	

Season	Tier	Division	Place	Copa del Rey
2020–21	7	3ª Cat.	4th	
2021–22	8	3ª Cat.	4th	
2022–23	8	3ª Cat.	3rd	
2023–24	9	3ª Cat.	2nd	
2024–25	9	3ª Cat.	13th	
2025–26	10	4ª Cat.		

- 17 seasons in Tercera División
