= CD Lugo =

Spanish football team

Lugo
- Full name: Club Deportivo Lugo S.A.D.
- Nicknames: Albivermellos (White and red); Luguiño (Little Lugo); O nabo mecánico (The Clockwork Game)
- Founded: 8 July 1953; 73 years ago
- Stadium: Anxo Carro
- Capacity: 7,114
- Owner: NWB Sport
- President: Ronald Baroni
- Head coach: Borja Fernández
- League: Primera Federación – Group 1
- 2025–26: Primera Federación – Group 1, 9th of 20
- Website: www.cdlugo.com
Home colours	Away colours

Club Deportivo Lugo, S.A.D. is a Spanish football team based in Lugo, in the autonomous community of Galicia. Founded on 8 July 1953, it plays in Primera Federación – Group 1, holding home games at Estadio Anxo Carro.

== History ==
The new board of directors was officially formed under the presidency of Emilio Núñez Torrón on Wednesday, 8 July 1953, after a merger between SG Lucense and CD Polvorín. CD Lugo played their first official match against Pontevedra CF on Sunday, 13 September 1953. Lugo won it 3–1. With the new configuration of the Tercera División from the 1956–57 season Lugo permanently played there for many further years. In the 1961–62 Lugo led by the coach Luis Diestro won their first trophy, becoming Tercera División champion.

Lugo earned promotion for the first time to Segunda División in 1992, but could not remain more than one season in the league. The 1992–93 season was unsuccessful for the club, as it had only 25 points in 38 games and finished in the 18th position among 20 teams. Lugo became a representative of the middle class of the Segunda División B. Between 1994 and 2000 the club had no problems retaining its place in the category.

It took 20 years before the club earned promotion again to the second division after beating Cádiz in the last round of the promotion play-offs, after a penalty shootout.

In 2013 the club started their second consecutive season in the Segunda. Lugo finished in 12th position with 54 points, just 4 points from being relegated to Segunda División B.

The 2014–15 season was the sixth and the last for coach Quique Setién. With 49 points Lugo reached 15th position and achieved their goal to retain its place in Segunda División. Luis Milla was chosen as a new coach for the 2015–16 season. Unfortunately, he left the club in February 2016. He explained that it was for personal reasons and the club accepted his resignation.

In October 2017, after twelve rounds of the 2017–18 season, Lugo for the first time in their history led the table of the Segunda División. However, the team finished that season in the 12th position.

During the 2018–19 season Lugo was fighting to stay in the Segunda División, and finally ended up on the 18th position which allowed them to remain in the Spanish Second Division for a seventh consecutive season. The club went undefeated in the last 6 games of the season which helped them finish just 2 points above the relegation zone.

In the 2022–23 Season, Lugo were relegated to third division, ending their 11 consecutive seasons in second division.

== Kit ==
The current kit consists of a red and white vertical striped shirt, light blue shorts and light blue socks. The shirt has remained unchanged since 1955 except in 1996 when horizontal stripes were chosen instead of vertical. The second kit isn't set and has changed multiple times. However, the light blue similar to the Flag of Galicia is the one that has been used the longest.

For the 2013–14 Second Division season, the company originally commissioned to make the kit was the Italian company Kappa, but due to disagreements over the retail price, the agreement was cancelled, and a new agreement was reached with the company Enfíos.

=== Kit history ===
2010	2013–14	2014–15	2015–17	2017–18	2018–19	2019–20	2020–21

== Season to season ==
Season	Tier	Division	Place	Copa del Rey
1953–54	3	3ª	5th	
1954–55	3	3ª	8th	
1955–56	3	3ª	9th	
1956–57	3	3ª	3rd	
1957–58	3	3ª	4th	
1958–59	3	3ª	3rd	
1959–60	3	3ª	5th	
1960–61	3	3ª	2nd	
1961–62	3	3ª	1st	
1962–63	3	3ª	2nd	
1963–64	3	3ª	4th	
1964–65	3	3ª	3rd	
1965–66	3	3ª	5th	
1966–67	3	3ª	2nd	
1967–68	3	3ª	4th	
1968–69	3	3ª	5th	
1969–70	3	3ª	2nd	Fourth round
1970–71	3	3ª	10th	First round
1971–72	3	3ª	16th	Second round
1972–73	4	Serie A	1st	

Season	Tier	Division	Place	Copa del Rey
1973–74	3	3ª	10th	First round
1974–75	3	3ª	5th	Third round
1975–76	3	3ª	15th	First round
1976–77	3	3ª	14th	First round
1977–78	4	3ª	1st	First round
1978–79	3	2ª B	18th	Second round
1979–80	4	3ª	7th	First round
1980–81	4	3ª	1st	First round
1981–82	4	3ª	3rd	First round
1982–83	4	3ª	4th	First round
1983–84	4	3ª	4th	Second round
1984–85	4	3ª	4th	First round
1985–86	4	3ª	1st	Second round
1986–87	3	2ª B	11th	Second round
1987–88	3	2ª B	9th	Third round
1988–89	3	2ª B	5th	Third round
1989–90	3	2ª B	5th	
1990–91	3	2ª B	2nd	First round
1991–92	3	2ª B	2nd	Fourth round
1992–93	2	2ª	18th	Fifth round

Season	Tier	Division	Place	Copa del Rey
1993–94	3	2ª B	8th	Third round
1994–95	3	2ª B	11th	Third round
1995–96	3	2ª B	10th	
1996–97	3	2ª B	20th	
1997–98	3	2ª B	6th	
1998–99	3	2ª B	11th	
1999–2000	3	2ª B	8th	
2000–01	3	2ª B	15th	
2001–02	3	2ª B	9th	
2002–03	3	2ª B	18th	
2003–04	4	3ª	6th	
2004–05	4	3ª	3rd	
2005–06	4	3ª	2nd	
2006–07	3	2ª B	9th	Second round
2007–08	3	2ª B	7th	
2008–09	3	2ª B	8th	First round
2009–10	3	2ª B	7th	
2010–11	3	2ª B	1st	
2011–12	3	2ª B	3rd	First round
2012–13	2	2ª	11th	Second round

Season	Tier	Division	Place	Copa del Rey
2013–14	2	2ª	12th	Third round
2014–15	2	2ª	15th	Third round
2015–16	2	2ª	14th	Third round
2016–17	2	2ª	9th	Second round
2017–18	2	2ª	12th	Third round
2018–19	2	2ª	18th	Round of 32
2019–20	2	2ª	16th	First round
2020–21	2	2ª	18th	Second round
2021–22	2	2ª	16th	Second round
2022–23	2	2ª	22nd	First round
2023–24	3	1ª Fed.	10th	Round of 32
2024–25	3	1ª Fed.	13th	
2025–26	3	1ª Fed.	9th	
2026–27	3	1ª Fed.		

- 12 seasons in Segunda División
- 4 seasons in Primera Federación
- 23 seasons in Segunda División B
- 34 seasons in Tercera División
- 1 season in Categorías Regionales

== Current squad ==
As of 4 November 2026

Note: Flags indicate national team as defined under FIFA eligibility rules; some limited exceptions apply. Players may hold more than one non-FIFA nationality.

No.	Pos.	Nation	Player
1	GK	ESP	Marc Martínez
2	DF	ETH	Achore Sánchez
3	DF	ESP	Pere Haro
4	DF	ESP	Ibaider Garriz
5	DF	ESP	Pol Moreno
6	MF	ESP	Kevin Presa
7	FW	GEO	Tornike Morchiladze
8	MF	ESP	Antonio Perera
9	FW	ESP	Álex Costa
10	FW	ESP	Alan Godoy
11	FW	GHA	Mo Dauda
13	GK	ESP	Jorge Candal
14	MF	ESP	Álex Gallar

No.	Pos.	Nation	Player
15	MF	ESP	Pablo Parrilla
16	FW	MEX	Arturo Palma
17	FW	ESP	Chiqui
18	DF	ESP	Kike Hermoso
19	DF	ARG	Rufino Lucero
20	MF	ESP	Alberto Ulloa (on loan from Tenerife)
21	MF	ESP	Guille Berzal
22	MF	ESP	Mateo Muñoz
23	DF	ESP	Hugo Pascual
24	DF	ESP	Simón Luca
25	GK	GBS	Fernando Embadje
—	MF	ESP	Mario Nájera

=== Youth team ===
Note: Flags indicate national team as defined under FIFA eligibility rules; some limited exceptions apply. Players may hold more than one non-FIFA nationality.

No.	Pos.	Nation	Player
26	DF	ESP	Uriel Vega

=== Out on loan ===
Note: Flags indicate national team as defined under FIFA eligibility rules; some limited exceptions apply. Players may hold more than one non-FIFA nationality.

No.	Pos.	Nation	Player
—	FW	SRB	Ognjen Teofilović (at Compostela until 30 June 2027)

=== Current technical staff ===
Position	Staff
Manager	(Spain) Alex Ortiz
Assistant manager	(Spain) Millán Fernández
Assistant coach	(Spain) Ángel Mociño
Analyst	(Spain) Adrià Díaz
Fitness coach	(Spain) Antón Eiré
Goalkeeping coach	(Spain) Fernando Currás
Assistant fitness coach	(Spain) Santiago Pineda
Technical assistant	(Spain) Diego Seoane
Doctor	(Spain) Roberto Díaz
Physiotherapists	(Spain) Iñaki Fernández (Spain) Daniel Xesús García
Rehab fitness coach	(Spain) Erik Penedo
Nutritionist	(Spain) Daniel Pedrosa
Delegate	(Spain) José Luis Corral

Last updated: May 2026
Source: CD Lugo (in Spanish)

== Stadium ==
CD Lugo play its home matches at the Estadio Anxo Carro. It has a capacity of approximately 8,000. Built in 1974 it was inaugurated on 31 August 1974, with a triangular tournament featuring also Deportivo de La Coruña and Club Lemos.

- Google map of Anxo Carro

== Famous players ==
Note: this list includes players that have appeared in at least 100 league games, have reached international status, or both.

- (Bolivia) Samuel Galindo
- (Cameroon) Serge Leuko
- (Equatorial Guinea) Iván Zarandona
- (Nigeria) Ramon Azeez
- (Philippines) Ángel Guirado
- (Spain) José Manuel Aira
- (Spain) Pablo Álvarez
- (Spain) Ángel Cuéllar
- (Spain) Iago Díaz
- (Spain) Fabri
- (Spain) Antonio Guayre
- (Spain) Iriome González
- (Spain) Paco Jémez
- (Spain) José Juan
- (Spain) Diego López
- (Spain) Manu
- (Spain) Víctor Marco
- (Spain) Carlos Pita
- (Spain) Pablo Rodríguez
- (Spain) Fernando Seoane

== Coaches ==
- (Spain) Ramón Polo (1951–52)
- (Argentina) Pontoni (1971–72)
- (Spain) Ignacio Martín-Esperanza (1974–75), (1982–83)
- (Spain) Fabri (1986–88)
- (Spain) Julio Díaz (1988–89), (1990–92)
- (Spain) Luis Rodríguez Vaz (1992–93)
- (Spain) Fernando Vázquez (1994–95)
- (Spain) Fabri (1999–2000)
- (Spain) Carlos García Cantarero (2000)
- (Spain) Julio Díaz (2000–01)
- (Spain) Víctor Basadre (2000–01)
- (Spain) Julio Díaz (2001–02)
- (Spain) Javier Vidales (2002–03)
- (Spain) José Durán (2004)
- (Spain) Carlos Ballesta (2004–05)
- (Spain) Quique Setién (2009–15)
- (Spain) Luis Milla (2015–16)
- (Spain) José Durán (2016)
- (Spain) Luis César Sampedro (2016–2017)
- (Spain) Francisco (2017–)

== Bibliography ==
- Pérez, Abraham: Sacho de seda, Menino Morreu, 2023.
