= UDA Gramenet =

Gramenet
- logo
- Full name: Unión Deportiva Atlético Gramenet
- Nickname: Grama
- Founded: 1945; 81 years ago
- Ground: Municipal de Sant Adria, Sant Adrià de Besòs, Catalonia, Spain
- Capacity: 1,000
- President: (Spain) Rafael Osuna
- Head coach: (Spain) Toni Díaz
- League: Quarta Catalana – Group 18
- 2024–25: Quarta Catalana – Group 21, 8th of 15
Home colours	Away colours

Unión Deportiva Atlético Gramenet is a Catalan Spanish football team based in Santa Coloma de Gramenet, in the autonomous community of Catalonia. Founded in 1945 it currently plays in Quarta Catalana – Group 18, holding home games at Municipal de Sant Adrià in Sant Adrià de Besòs, with a capacity of 1,000.

== History ==
UDA Gramenet was founded in 1945, through the merger of three teams from Santa Coloma de Gramenet: FC Gramenet, UD Colomense and CF Baleares. The club first reached the national categories in 1956, and first promoted to the third division 37 years later.

Gramenet finished three times in the top three in its first four seasons, but successively underachieved in the playoffs, against Real Jaén, Ourense and Sestao Sport Club (1993–94), Deportivo Alavés, Jaén and Las Palmas (1994–95) and Jaén, Lemona and Ourense (1996–97). In 1996 the club merged with C.D. Milán, who later became Gramenet B.

In the 2004–05 season, still in the third division, Gramenet could only place 16th in the league, but reached the quarterfinals of the Copa del Rey after ousting FC Barcelona, Levante and Lleida, only being downed by Real Betis (2–2 at home, 3–4 away) who later went on to win the tournament. In the following years the club would only participate once in the promotion playoffs, losing 3–6 on aggregate to Salamanca in 2006.

In 2014, the club was forced by the city hall to leave the Nou Camp Municipal in Santa Coloma de Gramenet and since the 2014–15 season, Gramenet plays its games at Sant Adrià de Besòs.

=== Background ===
Futbol Club Gramenet - (¿?–1945) → ↓

Unión Deportiva Colomense - (¿?–1945) → Unión Deportiva Atlético Gramenet - (1945–95) → Unión Deportiva Atlético Gramenet Milán (1995–¿?)

Club de Futbol Baleares - (¿?–1945) → ↑

Unión Deportiva Obreros- (¿?–1995) → ↓

Unión Deportiva Atlético Gramenet - (1945–95) → Unión Deportiva Atlético Gramenet Milán (1995–¿?)

Club Deportivo Milán-Gramanet- (¿?–1995) → ↑

== Season to season ==
Season	Tier	Division	Place	Copa del Rey
1945–46	6	2ª Reg. P.	2nd	
1946–47	6	3ª Reg.	4th	
1947–48	6	2ª Reg.	7th	
1948–49	6	2ª Reg.	9th	
1949–50	6	2ª Reg.	11th	
1950–51	6	2ª Reg.	9th	
1951–52	6	2ª Reg.	8th	
1952–53	6	2ª Reg.	2nd	
1953–54	6	3ª Reg.		
1954–55	5	2ª Reg.	4th	
1955–56	5	2ª Reg.	1st	
1956–57	3	3ª	3rd	
1957–58	3	3ª	8th	
1958–59	3	3ª	14th	
1959–60	4	1ª Reg.	2nd	
1960–61	3	3ª	9th	
1961–62	3	3ª	12th	
1962–63	3	3ª	14th	
1963–64	4	1ª Reg.	5th	
1964–65	4	1ª Reg.	6th	

Season	Tier	Division	Place	Copa del Rey
1965–66	4	1ª Reg.	4th	
1966–67	4	1ª Reg.	4th	
1967–68	4	1ª Reg.	1st	
1968–69	3	3ª	15th	
1969–70	3	3ª	11th	Second round
1970–71	4	Reg. Pref.	2nd	
1971–72	4	Reg. Pref.	16th	
1972–73	4	Reg. Pref.	2nd	
1973–74	4	Reg. Pref.	9th	
1974–75	4	Reg. Pref.	9th	
1975–76	4	Reg. Pref.	12th	
1976–77	4	Reg. Pref.	18th	
1977–78	6	1ª Reg.	1st	
1978–79	5	Reg. Pref.	2nd	
1979–80	4	3ª	10th	First round
1980–81	4	3ª	19th	First round
1981–82	5	Reg. Pref.	5th	
1982–83	5	Reg. Pref.	6th	
1983–84	5	Reg. Pref.	10th	
1984–85	5	Reg. Pref.	5th	

Season	Tier	Division	Place	Copa del Rey
1985–86	5	Reg. Pref.	1st	
1986–87	4	3ª	15th	
1987–88	4	3ª	9th	
1988–89	4	3ª	12th	
1989–90	4	3ª	8th	
1990–91	4	3ª	11th	
1991–92	4	3ª	1st	
1992–93	4	3ª	2nd	First round
1993–94	3	2ª B	1st	Fourth round
1994–95	3	2ª B	2nd	Second round
1995–96	3	2ª B	8th	First round
1996–97	3	2ª B	3rd	
1997–98	3	2ª B	10th	First round
1998–99	3	2ª B	6th	
1999–2000	3	2ª B	3rd	
2000–01	3	2ª B	1st	Round of 32
2001–02	3	2ª B	7th	Round of 32
2002–03	3	2ª B	4th	Round of 32
2003–04	3	2ª B	5th	Round of 32
2004–05	3	2ª B	16th	Quarterfinals

Season	Tier	Division	Place	Copa del Rey
2005–06	3	2ª B	4th	
2006–07	3	2ª B	11th	First round
2007–08	3	2ª B	8th	
2008–09	3	2ª B	6th	
2009–10	3	2ª B	15th	First round
2010–11	3	2ª B	18th	
2011–12	4	3ª	17th	
2012–13	4	3ª	9th	
2013–14	4	3ª	20th	
2014–15	5	1ª Cat.	15th	
2015–16	6	2ª Cat.	17th	
2016–17	7	3ª Cat.	8th	
2017–18	7	3ª Cat.	2nd	
2018–19	6	2ª Cat.	6th	
2019–20	6	2ª Cat.	13th	
2020–21	6	2ª Cat.	2nd	
2021–22	7	2ª Cat.	16th	
2022–23	8	3ª Cat.	18th	
2023–24	10	4ª Cat.	7th	
2024–25	10	4ª Cat.	8th	

Season	Tier	Division	Place	Copa del Rey
2025–26	10	4ª Cat.		

- 18 seasons in Segunda División B
- 20 seasons in Tercera División

== Famous players ==
Note: this list includes players that have played at least 100 league games and/or have reached international status.

- (Equatorial Guinea) Anselmo
- (Equatorial Guinea) Jacinto Elá
- (Morocco) Oussama Souaidy
- (Spain) Robert
- (Spain) Jorge Rojas
- (Spain) Curro Torres
- (Spain) Unai Vergara
- (Spain) Tito Vilanova

== See also ==
- UDA Gramenet B, reserve team
