= Jaume Bonet =

Spanish sports coach (born 1957)

Personal information
- Full name: Jaume Bonet Serrano
- Date of birth: 24 May 1957 (age 69)
- Place of birth: Valls, Spain

Team information
- Current team: Vilassar Dalt (coach)

Managerial career
- Years: Team
- 2001–2002: Gimnàstic
- 2006: Sabadell
- 2007–2008: EF Valls
- 2009–2010: Gavà
- 2012–2013: UE Valls
- 2014: Santboià
- 2014–: Vilassar Dalt

Jaume Bonet Serrano (born 24 May 1957) is a Spanish football coach, currently in charge of CE Vilassar de Dalt.

== Playing career ==
Born in Valls, Tarragona, Catalonia, Bonet was a goalkeeper coach at Gimnàstic de Tarragona and in November 2001 he was appointed manager of the club, replacing fired Josep María Nogués. He was also in charge during the historical 1–0 win against Real Madrid for the Copa del Rey, but his team was eventually knocked out after a 2–4 loss at the Santiago Bernabéu Stadium.

On 20 January 2002, Bonet was relieved of his duties after the arrival of Carlos Diarte, and eventually returned to his previous role. On 2 January 2006 he was named CE Sabadell FC manager, with the side struggling in Segunda División B; on 21 March, after failing to achieve any win, he was sacked.

In the 2009 summer, after a spell at EF Valls, Bonet was appointed at the helm of CF Gavà. Despite the team's relegation from the third division, he was sacked in May 2010 due to 'economical reasons'.

On 8 April 2014, Bonet was named manager of FC Santboià until the end of the season. On 21 May he left the club, and moved to CE Vilassar de Dalt shortly after.
