= Ballesta =

Ballesta is a Spanish surname. Notable people with the surname include:

- Carlos Ballesta (born 1955), Spanish footballer and manager
- José Ballesta (1958–2026), Spanish medical professor and politician
- Juan José Ballesta (born 1987), Spanish actor
- Salva Ballesta (born 1975), Spanish footballer and manager
