= Pontoni (footballer) =

Argentine football player and manager (1930–2003)

Personal information
- Full name: Abel Morán Puente
- Date of birth: 29 January 1930
- Place of birth: Fortín Olavarría, Argentina
- Date of death: 7 April 2003 (aged 73)
- Position: Defender

Youth career
- Esteiro

Senior career*
Years	Team	Apps	(Gls)
1946–1947	Esteiro		
1947–1948	Arsenal Ferrol		
1948–1949	Cultural Leonesa		
1949–1951	Arsenal Ferrol		
1951–1952	Esteiro		
1952–1956	Lemos		
1956–1961	Valladolid	96	(1)
1961–1962	Atlético Baleares	21	(0)
1962–1964	Granada	32	(0)
1964–1965	Atlético Baleares		
1965–1967	Adra		

Managerial career
- 1969–1971: Unión Estepona
- 1971–1972: Lugo
- Lemos
- Arsenal Ferrol
- Viveiro
- Racing Villalbés
- O Val
- Galicia Mugardos
- Aspirantes
- Piñeiros
- Rápido de Neda
- Bertón
- Racing San Pedro
- * Club domestic league appearances and goals

Abel Morán Puente (29 January 1930 – 7 April 2003), commonly known as Pontoni, was an Argentinefootballer who played as a defender, and was a manager.

== Playing career ==
Born in Fortín Olavarría, Rivadavia, Pontoni moved to Spain at the age of two. He began his senior career at SRD Esteiro, and appeared for a number of clubs in Galicia.

In 1956, aged already 26, Pontoni joined Real Valladolid in La Liga. He made his debut in the competition on 16 September 1956, playing the full 90 minutes of a 2–1 home win against FC Barcelona.

Pontoni appeared in 11 matches in the 1957–58 campaign, as his side suffered relegation. On 30 November 1958 he scored his first professional goal, netting the last in a 3–1 away win against Racing de Ferrol in the Segunda División.

He left the Blanquivioletas in 1960, with his side suffering another top level relegation. He subsequently represented CD Atlético Baleares and Granada CF in the second division, before retiring with Adra CF in 1967.

== Managerial career ==
After his retirement Pontoni was appointed manager of Unión Estepona CF in 1969. Two years later he was appointed at the helm of CD Lugo, but his reign only lasted one season.

Subsequently, Pontoni managed clubs in his native Galicia, notably coaching Club Lemos, RC Villalbés and SDC Galicia Mugardos.

== Death ==
Pontoni died on 7 April 2003, at the age of 73.
