= Vilassar =

Vilassar may refer to two places in the Province of Barcelona, Catalonia, Spain:

- Vilassar de Dalt, Maresme
- Vilassar de Mar, Maresme
