= Jorge Rojas (Spanish footballer) =

Spanish footballer

Personal information
- Full name: Jorge Rojas Justicia
- Date of birth: 15 April 1983 (age 43)
- Place of birth: Santa Coloma, Spain
- Height: 1.82 m (6 ft 0 in)
- Position: Centre back

Youth career
- Gramenet

Senior career*
Years	Team	Apps	(Gls)
2002–2005	Gramenet B		
2004–2010	Gramenet	126	(5)
2010–2012	Alcoyano	55	(1)
2012–2013	Atlético Baleares	34	(0)
2013–2016	Olot	91	(2)
2016–2017	Europa	9	(0)
2017–2020	Grama	82	(4)
- * Club domestic league appearances and goals

Jorge Rojas Justicia (born 15 April 1983) is a Spanish former footballer who played as a central defender.

Rojas played in the Segunda Divion with CD Alcoyano.
