= FE Grama =

Association football club in Spain

Grama
- Full name: Fundació Esportiva Grama
- Founded: 2 July 2013; 13 years ago
- Ground: Nou Municipal, Santa Coloma, Catalonia, Spain
- Capacity: 5,000
- Chairman: Antonio Morales García
- Manager: Toni Díaz
- League: Tercera Federación – Group 5
- 2025–26: Tercera Federación – Group 5, 6th of 18
- Website: fegrama.cat/web/
Home colours	Away colours

Fundació Esportiva Grama is a Spanish football team based in Santa Coloma de Gramenet, Barcelona, in the autonomous community of Catalonia. Founded on 2 July 2013, it plays in Tercera Federación – Group 5, holding home games at Nou Municipal de Gramenet, with a capacity of 5,000.

== Season to season ==
Season	Tier	Division	Place	Copa del Rey
2013–14	8	4ª Cat.	9th	
2014–15	8	4ª Cat.	1st	
2015–16	7	3ª Cat.	1st	
2016–17	6	2ª Cat.	1st	
2017–18	5	1ª Cat.	1st	
2018–19	4	3ª	18th	
2019–20	5	1ª Cat.	2nd	
2020–21	4	3ª	6th / 6th	
2021–22	5	3ª RFEF	9th	
2022–23	5	3ª Fed.	10th	
2023–24	5	3ª Fed.	10th	
2024–25	5	3ª Fed.	8th	
2025–26	5	3ª Fed.	6th	
2026–27	5	3ª Fed.		

- 2 seasons in Tercera División
- 6 seasons in Tercera Federación/Tercera División RFEF

== Players ==
=== Current squad ===
As of 29 September 2025

Note: Flags indicate national team as defined under FIFA eligibility rules; some limited exceptions apply. Players may hold more than one non-FIFA nationality.

No.	Pos.	Nation	Player
1	GK	ESP	Guiu Escobar
2	DF	ESP	Maikel Tijan
3	DF	ESP	Joel Toledo
4	MF	ESP	Marc Canteras
5	DF	URU	Alan Liesegang
6	MF	ESP	Guillem Escarrabill
7	FW	ESP	Bilal Charreh
8	MF	ESP	Ignasi Varona
9	FW	ESP	Martí Alonso
10	MF	ESP	Roger Peris
11	DF	ESP	Iván Julián

No.	Pos.	Nation	Player
12	DF	ESP	Biel del Valle
13	GK	ESP	Arnau Meca
14	FW	ESP	Roger García
16	FW	ESP	Fran Orellana
17	DF	ESP	Manel Martínez
18	MF	ESP	Adri Méndez
19	MF	ESP	Cesc Rius
20	MF	ESP	Yassin Bouchane
21	MF	ESP	Pepe Bonilla
22	FW	ESP	Adrià Padillo
23	FW	ESP	Fares Halfaoui
