= Vilassar de Dalt Archive-Museum =

Coordinates: 41°31′9.35″N 2°21′24.24″E

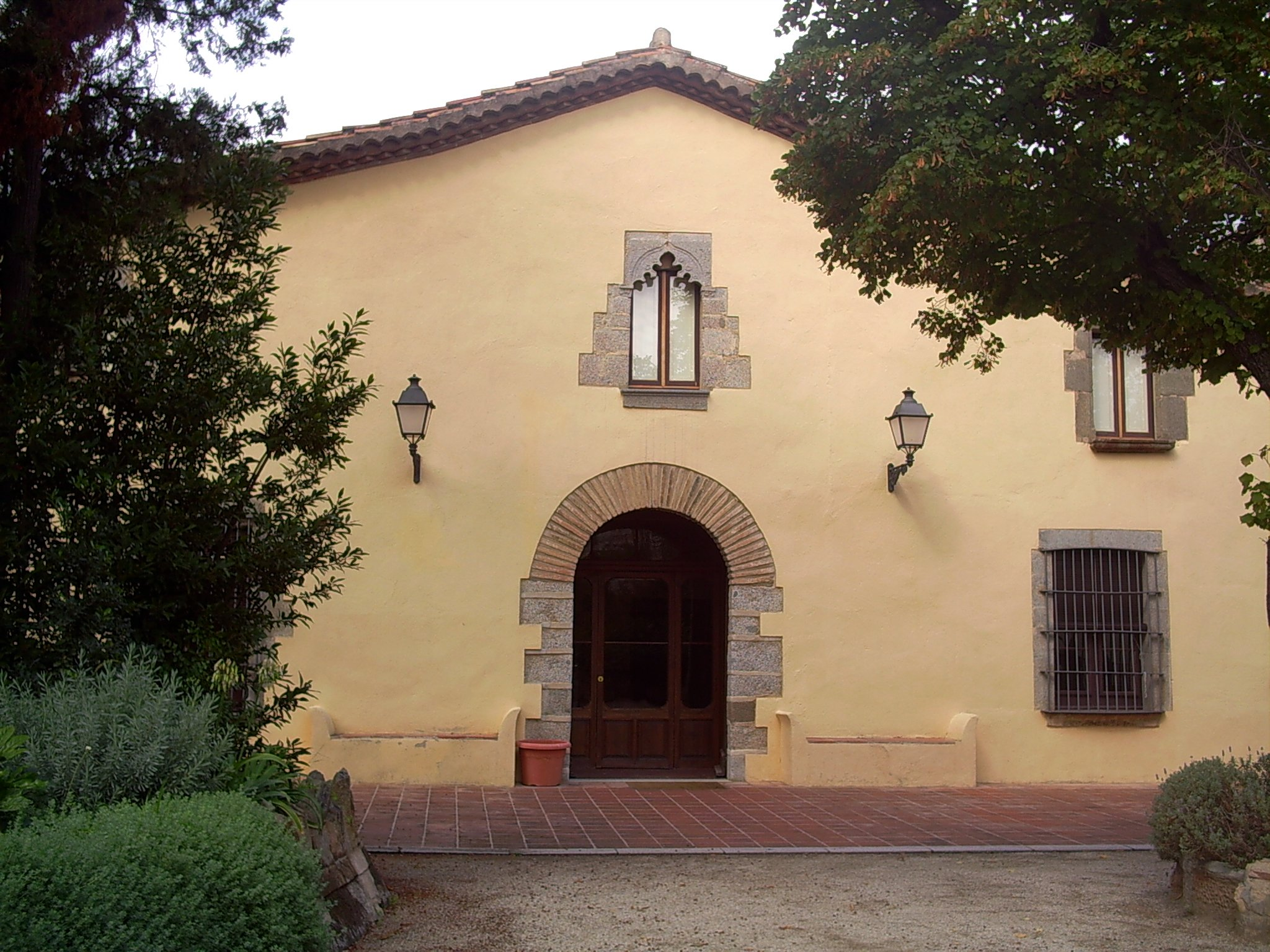
Façade of Vilassar de Dalt Archive-Museum

The purpose of the Vilassar de Dalt Archive-Museum (Catalan: Museu-Arxiu de Vilassar de Dalt) is the conservation and dissemination of the archaeological, architectural, historical, natural and cultural heritage of Vilassar de Dalt and its environment. Located in the Can Banús farmhouse, records for which date back as far as the 14th century, its main collection can be broken down into four categories: archaeology, textiles, history and the historic archive.

Founded in 1961, the Archive-Museum is part of the Barcelona Provincial Council Local Museum Network and houses the Serralada Litoral Park Documentation Centre. Its collections are brought to the public as temporary exhibitions produced in-house and organised in sections: history, photography, textiles, natural sciences and archaeology. In addition, the Archive-Museum manages the archaeological site of the Roman ovens of the Fornaca.
