= UD Cassà =

Football team

Cassà
- Full name: Unió Deportiva Cassà
- Founded: 1946
- Ground: Estadi Municipal, Cassà de la Selva, Catalonia, Spain
- Capacity: 2,000
- Chairman: (Spain) Ramón Codina
- Manager: (Spain) Albert Siria
- League: Tercera Catalana – Group 2
- 2024–25: Tercera Catalana – Group 2, 6th of 16
Home colours	Away colours

Unió Deportiva Cassà is a football team based in Cassà in the autonomous community of Catalonia. Founded in 1946, the team plays in Tercera Catalana – Group 2. The club's home ground is Estadi Municipal, which has a capacity of 2,000 spectators.

== History ==
- Founded in 1946.
- In June 2010, the club was relegated to Preferent Territorial due to economic limitations.

== Season to season ==
Season	Tier	Division	Place	Copa del Rey
1946–47	7	4ª Reg.	1st	
1947–48	6	2ª Reg.		
1948–49	6	2ª Reg.	2nd	
1949–50	6	2ª Reg.	3rd	
1950–51	5	1ª Reg. B	12th	
1951–52	5	1ª Reg. B	11th	
1952–53	5	1ª Reg. B	9th	
1953–54	5	2ª Reg.	2nd	
1954–55	4	1ª Reg.	6th	
1955–56	4	1ª Reg.	5th	
1956–57	4	1ª Reg.	12th	
1957–58	4	1ª Reg.	18th	
1958–59	5	2ª Reg.	4th	
1959–60	5	2ª Reg.	2nd	
1960–61	5	2ª Reg.	2nd	
1961–62	4	1ª Reg.	13th	
1962–63	4	1ª Reg.	14th	
1963–64	5	2ª Reg.	6th	
1964–65	5	2ª Reg.	1st	
1965–66	4	1ª Reg.	12th	

Season	Tier	Division	Place	Copa del Rey
1966–67	4	1ª Reg.	11th	
1967–68	4	1ª Reg.	12th	
1968–69	5	1ª Reg.	5th	
1969–70	5	1ª Reg.	4th	
1970–71	5	1ª Reg.	12th	
1971–72	5	1ª Reg.	8th	
1972–73	5	1ª Reg.	7th	
1973–74	5	1ª Reg.	19th	
1974–75	6	2ª Reg.	1st	
1975–76	5	1ª Reg.	7th	
1976–77	5	1ª Reg.	20th	
1977–78	7	2ª Reg.	9th	
1978–79	7	2ª Reg.	12th	
1979–80	7	2ª Reg.	10th	
1980–81	7	2ª Reg.	10th	
1981–82	7	2ª Reg.	10th	
1982–83	7	2ª Reg.	6th	
1983–84	7	2ª Reg.	4th	
1984–85	6	1ª Reg.	8th	
1985–86	6	1ª Reg.	11th	

Season	Tier	Division	Place	Copa del Rey
1986–87	6	1ª Reg.	6th	
1987–88	6	1ª Reg.	9th	
1988–89	6	1ª Reg.	7th	
1989–90	6	1ª Reg.	14th	
1990–91	6	1ª Reg.	13th	
1991–92	7	1ª Terr.	15th	
1992–93	7	1ª Terr.	14th	
1993–94	7	1ª Terr.	10th	
1994–95	7	1ª Terr.	5th	
1995–96	7	1ª Terr.	2nd	
1996–97	6	Pref. Terr.	9th	
1997–98	6	Pref. Terr.	12th	
1998–99	6	Pref. Terr.	4th	
1999–2000	6	Pref. Terr.	4th	
2000–01	6	Pref. Terr.	14th	
2001–02	6	Pref. Terr.	7th	
2002–03	6	Pref. Terr.	9th	
2003–04	6	Pref. Terr.	11th	
2004–05	6	Pref. Terr.	2nd	
2005–06	5	1ª Cat.	14th	

Season	Tier	Division	Place	Copa del Rey
2006–07	5	1ª Cat.	1st	
2007–08	4	3ª	14th	
2008–09	4	3ª	13th	
2009–10	4	3ª	15th	
2010–11	6	Pref. Terr.	17th	
2011–12	6	2ª Cat.	16th	
2012–13	7	3ª Cat.	5th	
2013–14	7	3ª Cat.	1st	
2014–15	6	2ª Cat.	7th	
2015–16	6	2ª Cat.	5th	
2016–17	6	2ª Cat.	3rd	
2017–18	6	2ª Cat.	4th	
2018–19	6	2ª Cat.	13th	
2019–20	6	2ª Cat.	17th	
2020–21	6	2ª Cat.	8th	
2021–22	7	2ª Cat.	4th	
2022–23	7	2ª Cat.	11th	
2023–24	9	3ª Cat.	2nd	
2024–25	9	3ª Cat.	6th	
2025–26	9	3ª Cat.		

- 3 seasons in Tercera División
