= CD La Cava =

Association football club in Spain

La Cava
- Full name: Club Deportivo La Cava
- Founded: 1931
- Ground: EF Delta de l'Ebre, Deltebre, Catalonia, Spain
- Capacity: 2,000
- President: Josep Arques
- Manager: Antoni Texidó
- League: Segona Catalana – Group 6
- 2024–25: Tercera Catalana – Group 18, 1st of 16 (champions)
- Website: https://www.cdlacava.com/
Home colours	Away colours

Club Deportivo La Cava is a Spanish football team based in Deltebre, Tarragona, Catalonia. Founded in 1931, they play in the Segona Catalana – Group 6, holding home matches at the Campo de Fútbol EF Delta de l'Ebre.

== Season to season ==
Season	Tier	Division	Place	Copa del Rey
1943–44	7	3ª Reg.	2nd	
1944–45	8	3ª Reg.	3rd	
1945–46	6	2ª Reg.	4th	
1946–47	7	4ª Reg.	4th	
1947–48	5	1ª Reg. B	4th	
1948–49	5	1ª Reg. B	6th	
1949–50	5	1ª Reg. B	4th	
1950–51	4	1ª Reg. A	10th	
1951–52	4	1ª Reg. A	7th	
1952–53	4	1ª Reg. A	8th	
1953–54	4	1ª Reg.	10th	
1954–55	4	1ª Reg.	2nd	
1955–56	3	3ª	7th	
1956–57	3	3ª	12th	
1957–58	3	3ª	(R)	
1958–59	3	3ª	8th	
1959–60	3	3ª	5th	
1960–61	3	3ª	15th	
1961–62	4	1ª Reg.	5th	
1962–63	4	1ª Reg.	4th	

Season	Tier	Division	Place	Copa del Rey
1963–64	4	1ª Reg.	17th	
1964–65	4	1ª Reg.	10th	
1965–66	4	1ª Reg.	2nd	
1966–67	4	1ª Reg.	12th	
1967–68	4	1ª Reg.	7th	
1968–69	4	Reg. Pref.	9th	
1969–70	4	Reg. Pref.	7th	
1970–71	4	Reg. Pref.	6th	
1971–72	4	Reg. Pref.	12th	
1972–73	4	Reg. Pref.	13th	
1973–74	4	Reg. Pref.	14th	
1974–75	4	Reg. Pref.	16th	
1975–76	4	Reg. Pref.	9th	
1976–77	4	Reg. Pref.	7th	
1977–78	4	3ª	9th	Second round
1978–79	4	3ª	9th	First round
1979–80	4	3ª	17th	First round
1980–81	4	3ª	13th	
1981–82	4	3ª	11th	
1982–83	4	3ª	19th	

Season	Tier	Division	Place	Copa del Rey
1983–84	6	1ª Reg.	9th	
1984–85	6	1ª Reg.	18th	
1985–86	7	2ª Reg.	5th	
1986–87	7	2ª Reg.	2nd	
1987–88	6	1ª Reg.	6th	
1988–89	6	1ª Reg.	9th	
1989–90	6	1ª Reg.	4th	
1990–91	6	1ª Reg.	1st	
1991–92	6	Pref. Terr.	12th	
1992–93	6	Pref. Terr.	17th	
1993–94	7	1ª Terr.	8th	
1994–95	7	1ª Terr.	3rd	
1995–96	7	1ª Terr.	8th	
1996–97	7	1ª Terr.	8th	
1997–98	7	1ª Terr.	6th	
1998–99	7	1ª Terr.	8th	
1999–2000	7	1ª Terr.	5th	
2000–01	7	1ª Terr.	9th	
2001–02	7	1ª Terr.	13th	
2002–03	7	1ª Terr.	11th	

Season	Tier	Division	Place	Copa del Rey
2003–04	7	1ª Terr.	5th	
2004–05	7	1ª Terr.	13th	
2005–06	7	1ª Terr.	7th	
2006–07	7	1ª Terr.	8th	
2007–08	7	1ª Terr.	4th	
2008–09	7	1ª Terr.	3rd	
2009–10	7	1ª Terr.	6th	
2010–11	7	1ª Terr.	5th	
2011–12	6	2ª Cat.	8th	
2012–13	6	2ª Cat.	3rd	
2013–14	6	2ª Cat.	10th	
2014–15	6	2ª Cat.	6th	
2015–16	6	2ª Cat.	5th	
2016–17	6	2ª Cat.	12th	
2017–18	6	2ª Cat.	13th	
2018–19	7	3ª Cat.	10th	
2019–20	7	3ª Cat.	5th	
2020–21	7	3ª Cat.	7th	
2021–22	8	3ª Cat.	3rd	
2022–23	8	3ª Cat.	4th	

Season	Tier	Division	Place	Copa del Rey
2023–24	9	3ª Cat.	4th	
2024–25	9	3ª Cat.	1st	
2025–26	8	2ª Cat.		

- 12 seasons in Tercera División
