= CE Vilassar de Dalt =

Vilassar de Dalt
- Full name: Club Esportiu Vilassar de Dalt
- Founded: 1921
- Ground: Camp Municipal de Vallmorena, Vilassar de Dalt, Catalonia, Spain
- Capacity: 2,000
- Chairman: Carlos Povedano
- Manager: Toni Corominas
- League: Tercera Catalana – Group 6
- 2024–25: Tercera Catalana – Group 6, 4th of 16
Home colours	Away colours

Club Esportiu Vilassar de Dalt is the main football club in the town of Vilassar de Dalt. It was founded in 1921 from the merger of the two teams that were in the village, Esbart and Centro de Sports.

Following the local town celebrations, the old sand Vilassar stadium was built. It gave way in 2006 to a modern stadium with artificial turf and capacity for approximately 2000 people.

The club has more than 400 players from the young squads to the first team. In the 2011-2012 season the club achieved an historic first promotion to Primera Catalana. In the 2024-2025 season, the club secured promotion for its youth team to the Liga Nacional, where they will play in Group 7 of the league during the 2025-2026 season. The club has several youth teams in good categories and is known for its excellent work with its youth academy. One of the players who has played for the club is Jan Virgili, who has just been signed by Real Club Deportivo Mallorca. The sports facilities also have a booth set radio, eight dressing rooms, a bar and parking.

== Season to season ==
Season	Tier	Division	Place	Copa del Rey
1939–40	7	2ª Reg.	8th	
1940–1946	DNP			
1946–47	6	3ª Reg.	4th	
1947–48	6	3ª Reg.		
1948–49	6	2ª Reg.	3rd	
1949–50	6	2ª Reg.	1st	
1950–51	5	1ª Reg. B	15th	
1951–52	6	2ª Reg.	13th	
1952–53	6	2ª Reg.		
1953–54	6	Liga Com.	6th	
1954–1958	DNP			
1958–59	5	2ª Reg.	4th	
1959–60	5	2ª Reg.		
1960–61	5	2ª Reg.	4th	
1961–62	4	1ª Reg.	7th	
1962–63	4	1ª Reg.	8th	
1963–64	4	1ª Reg.	19th	
1964–65	5	2ª Reg.	4th	
1965–66	5	2ª Reg.	2nd	
1966–67	5	2ª Reg.	6th	
1967–68	5	2ª Reg.	4th	

Season	Tier	Division	Place	Copa del Rey
1968–69	5	1ª Reg.	10th	
1969–70	5	1ª Reg.	16th	
1970–71	6	2ª Reg.	1st	
1971–72	5	1ª Reg.	16th	
1972–73	5	1ª Reg.	18th	
1972–73	5	1ª Reg.	8th	
1973–74	6	2ª Reg.	12th	
1974–75	6	2ª Reg.	5th	
1975–76	6	2ª Reg.	3rd	
1976–77	6	2ª Reg.	10th	
1977–78	7	2ª Reg.	19th	
1978–79	8	3ª Reg.	8th	
1979–80	8	3ª Reg.	2nd	
1980–81	8	3ª Reg.	2nd	
1981–82	7	2ª Reg.	12th	
1982–83	7	2ª Reg.	14th	
1983–84	7	2ª Reg.	13th	
1984–85	7	2ª Reg.	6th	
1985–86	7	2ª Reg.	2nd	
1986–87	7	2ª Reg.	12th	
1987–88	7	2ª Reg.	12th	

Season	Tier	Division	Place	Copa del Rey
1988–89	7	2ª Reg.	9th	
1989–90	7	2ª Reg.	5th	
1990–91	7	2ª Reg.	3rd	
1991–92	8	2ª Terr.	7th	
1992–93	8	2ª Terr.	2nd	
1993–94	7	1ª Terr.	4th	
1994–95	7	1ª Terr.	6th	
1995–96	7	1ª Terr.	12th	
1996–97	7	1ª Terr.	4th	
1997–98	7	1ª Terr.	6th	
1998–99	7	1ª Terr.	6th	
1999–2000	7	1ª Terr.	5th	
2000–01	7	1ª Terr.	8th	
2001–02	7	1ª Terr.	4th	
2002–03	7	1ª Terr.	2nd	
2003–04	6	Pref. Terr.	12th	
2004–05	6	Pref. Terr.	12th	
2005–06	6	Pref. Terr.	9th	
2006–07	6	Pref. Terr.	7th	
2007–08	6	Pref. Terr.	11th	

Season	Tier	Division	Place	Copa del Rey
2008–09	6	Pref. Terr.	3rd	
2009–10	6	Pref. Terr.	15th	
2010–11	7	1ª Terr.	3rd	
2011–12	6	2ª Cat.	1st	
2012–13	5	1ª Cat.	11th	
2013–14	5	1ª Cat.	13th	
2014–15	8	4ª Cat.	1st	
2015–16	7	3ª Cat.	5th	
2016–17	7	3ª Cat.	17th	
2017–18	8	4ª Cat.	1st	
2018–19	7	3ª Cat.	6th	
2019–20	7	3ª Cat.	4th	
2020–21	7	3ª Cat.	2nd	
2021–22	8	3ª Cat.	1st	
2022–23	7	2ª Cat.	11th	
2023–24	9	3ª Cat.	3rd	
2024–25	9	3ª Cat.	4th	
2025–26	9	3ª Cat.		

== Current squad ==
As of 24 July 2014. Note: Flags indicate national team as defined under FIFA eligibility rules; some limited exceptions apply. Players may hold more than one non-FIFA nationality.

No.	Pos.	Nation	Player
—	GK	ESP	Joaquin Ortega
4	DF	DOM	Edu
—	DF	ESP	Xavi Tierz
—	DF	ESP	Jaume Turon

No.	Pos.	Nation	Player
—	MF	ESP	Esteve Forgas
—	MF	ESP	Pol Gisbert
—	FW	ESP	Christian Muñoz
—	FW	ESP	Adri Domingo
