= Anthony Santos (footballer) =

Dominican footballer

Personal information
- Full name: Anthony Dervin Santos Candelario
- Date of birth: 5 August 1992 (age 34)
- Place of birth: Puerto Plata, Dominican Republic
- Height: 1.75 m (5 ft 9 in)
- Position: Defender

Team information
- Current team: Chantada Atlético

Senior career*
Years	Team	Apps	(Gls)
–2012	Calasancio		
2012–2014	Lemos	33	(1)
2013	Bóveda	1	(0)
2014	Lemos	10	(0)
2014	Bóveda	4	(1)
2014–2015	Lemos	12	(0)
2015	Atlántico		
2015–2016	O Incio Terra Brava	25	(9)
2016	Xunqueira de Ambia	4	(1)
2016–2017	Verín	11	(1)
2017	Atlántico		
2017–2018	Lemos	28	(2)
2018	Chantada Atlético	4	(0)
2018–2019	UD Ourense	4	(0)
2019–	Chantada Atlético	11	(5)

International career
2015	Dominican Republic	1	(0)
- * Club domestic league appearances and goals as of 5 May 2019

Anthony Dervin Santos Candelario (born 5 August 1992) is a Dominican footballer who plays for Chantada Club Atlético as a defender.

== Early life ==
Born in Puerto Plata, Santos went with his parents to live in Spain aged 5. From then on, he was interested in doing football as a sport and practiced it at school.

== Career ==
=== Club Lemos ===
Along with Adrián González, the defender joined Club Lemos of the Spanish fifth division in 2014, saying that he liked the friendliness of his teammates and the atmosphere there.

However, in early 2015, Santos was forced to return to the Dominican Republic for personal reasons, expressing effusiveness at the premature exit and stating that he thoroughly enjoyed his experience in Monforte de Lemos.

During his stint there, he was also coach of their youth categories, connecting well with the children who regretted his early departure.

=== Atlántico FC ===
Upon going back to his home country, Santos was snapped up by Liga Dominicana de Fútbol championship contenders Atlántico FC, making a solid impression in his first few games and becoming the starting left-back. The footballer also expressed surprise on the quality of football in the Dominican Republic top-level, claiming that it was better than he thought.
