= Hugo Pascual =

Spanish footballer

Personal information
- Full name: Hugo Pascual Pérez-Griffo
- Date of birth: 17 August 2005 (age 21)
- Place of birth: Barcelona, Spain
- Position: Centre-back

Team information
- Current team: Burgos B
- Number: 5

Youth career
- Vilassar Dalt
- Alella
- Vilassar Dalt
- 2021–2022: Sabadell
- 2022–2024: Espanyol

Senior career*
Years	Team	Apps	(Gls)
2024–	Burgos B	64	(6)
2024–	Burgos	1	(0)
- * Club domestic league appearances and goals as of 14 May 2026

Hugo Pascual Pérez-Griffo (born 17 August 2005) is a Spanish footballer who plays as a centre-back for Burgos CF Promesas.

== Club career ==
Pascual was born in Barcelona, Catalonia, and played for CE Vilassar de Dalt, CF Alella and CE Sabadell FC before joining RCD Espanyol's youth setup in July 2022. He left the latter in July 2024, and signed for Burgos CF on 26 July, being initially assigned to the reserves in Tercera Federación.

After spending the pre-season with the main squad, Pascual made his senior – and professional – debut on 1 September 2024, starting in a 2–0 Segunda División home loss to CD Castellón.
