= Cau del Cargol =

Museum in Catalonia, Spain

Coordinates: 41°31′0.64″N 2°21′26.64″E

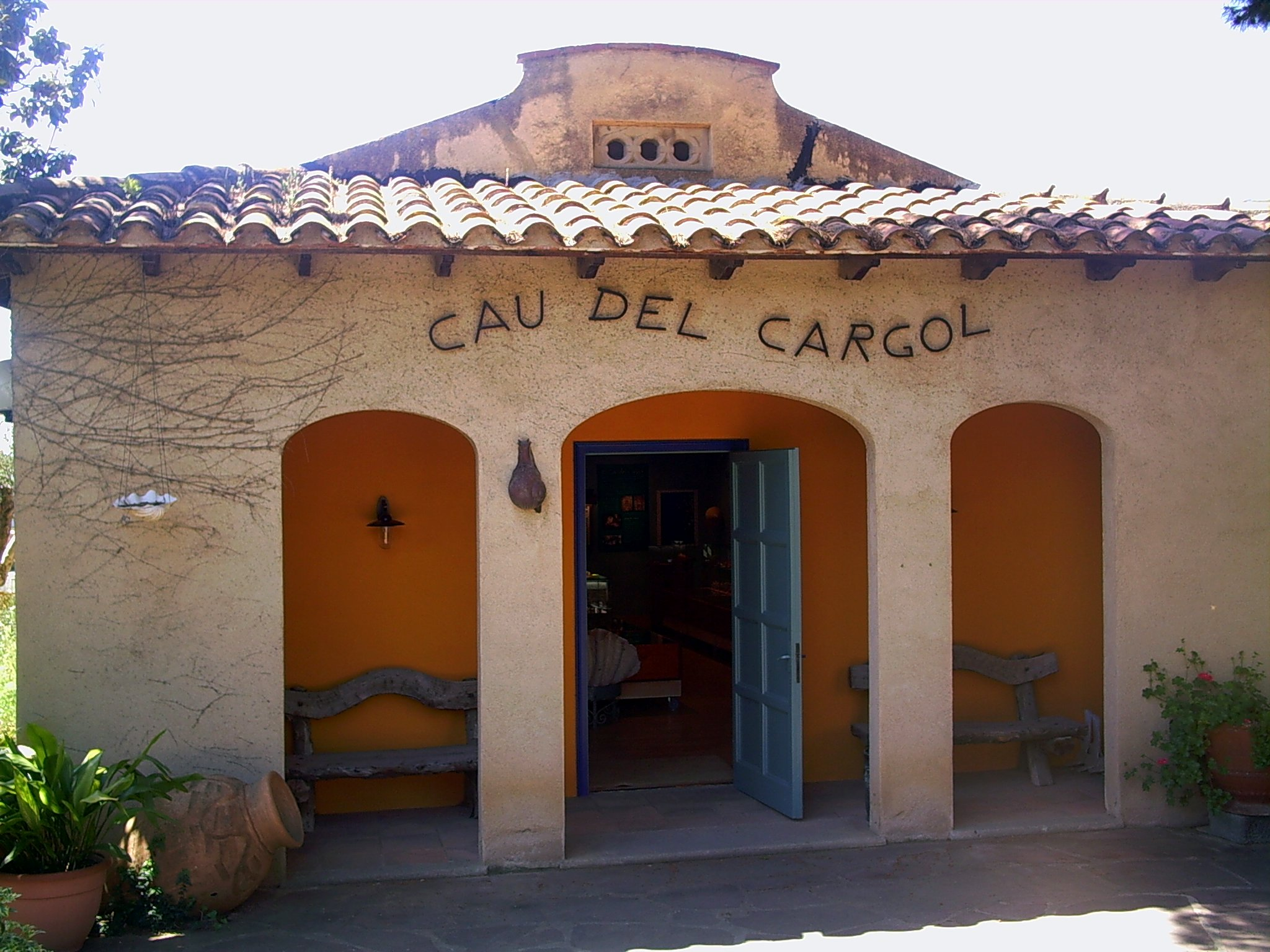
Museu del Cau del Cargol

The Cau del Cargol Shells of the World Museum is a museum containing a large private collection of shells; it is situated in Vilassar de Dalt (Catalonia, Spain). The collection includes over 16,000 worldwide species of mollusc shells, from marine, terrestrial and freshwater habitats. The museum was created in the year 1950, when its founder Jaume Bot i Arenas (1904-1983), started to exhibit his own collection to the public. Later he expanded his collection by acquiring other people's collections. He was able to reunite the collections of several different naturalists; material that had been collected from 1850 to 1983.

The Cau del Cargol museum houses one of the biggest shell collections that is open to the public. About one thousand shell specimens are displayed in a room which has been recently renovated. The museum is often visited by classes from regional schools that are studying natural history and zoology.

The museum is open to visitors on the first Sunday of every month, from 11 am to 2 pm, and at other times by special request.

== Contents ==
Shells that can be seen in Cau del Cargol are terrestrial mollusca, marine and freshwater or brackish. Just as in nature, most of the collection are marine species. Shells exhibits are grouped with biogeographic criteria. Thus, grouped into 16 zoogeogràfical marine regions defined in the 19th century by SP Woodward, geologist and professor of natural history in his studies of Malacology. These regions based on zoogeography are characterized by the presence of certain species that unit them and at the same time, put them apart from those from other areas. The criterion of geographical grouping of units exposed favors contemplation of the exhibition as a journey around the world through the shells.

In the same room where shells are exposed, there are eight permanent panels that invite to the reflection on the world of form and color in nature. The panels explain that the world of form and color does not exist nor can be understood without the scope of invisible energy fields. They also invite us to think on the way we perceive the world and the relationship between power and scope of consciousness.

== Topics ==
The museum covers the following topics:

1. Shapes and colors, where shapes and colors are introduced to a language of nature.
2. Unity in diversity, diversity in explaining the workings of the Earth with references to James Lovelock's Gaia Hypothesis.
3. From the infinitely small to the infinitely present, which explains the changes in the vision of biology and life arising from discoveries of quantum mechanics and Albert Einstein's theory of relativity.
4. Energy fields and morphic fields, which explains morphogenetic fields described by English biologist Rupert Sheldrake.
5. Relationships and proportions in the world of form, which entered the study and meaning of proportions and the golden section in nature and in man, and Leonardo da Vinci some thoughts on the subject.
6. Water and spiral, which explains the relationship between water and the expansion of the spiral of life.
7. Natural History and Culture, which highlights the impact that culture has on the dominant scientific interpretation of nature and introduces some thoughts on Albert Einstein's scientific attitude.
8. Perception and intuition, which invites to think on the way we perceive the world and life.

== Gallery ==
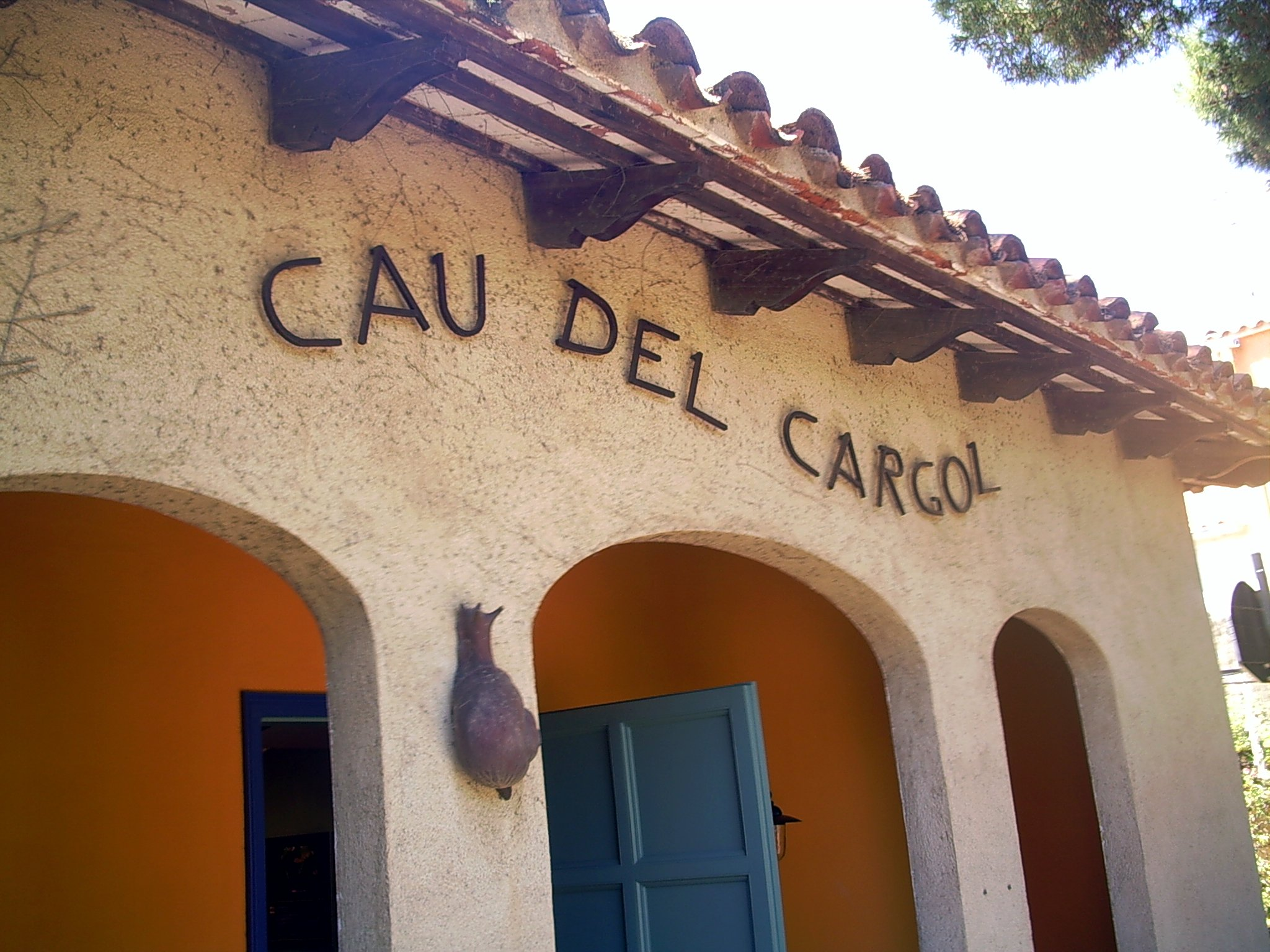
The museum entrance

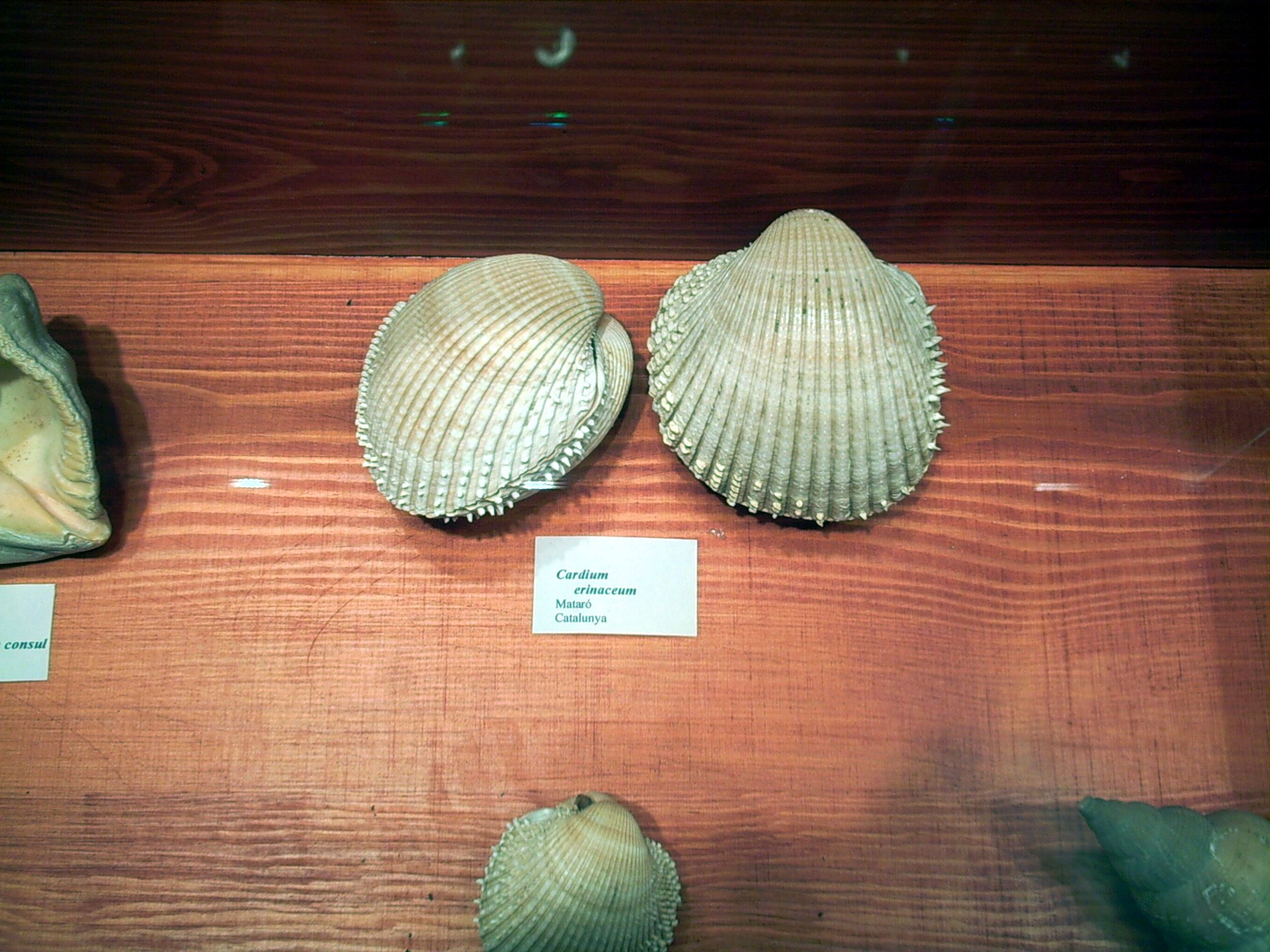
Acanthocardia erinacea from Mataró

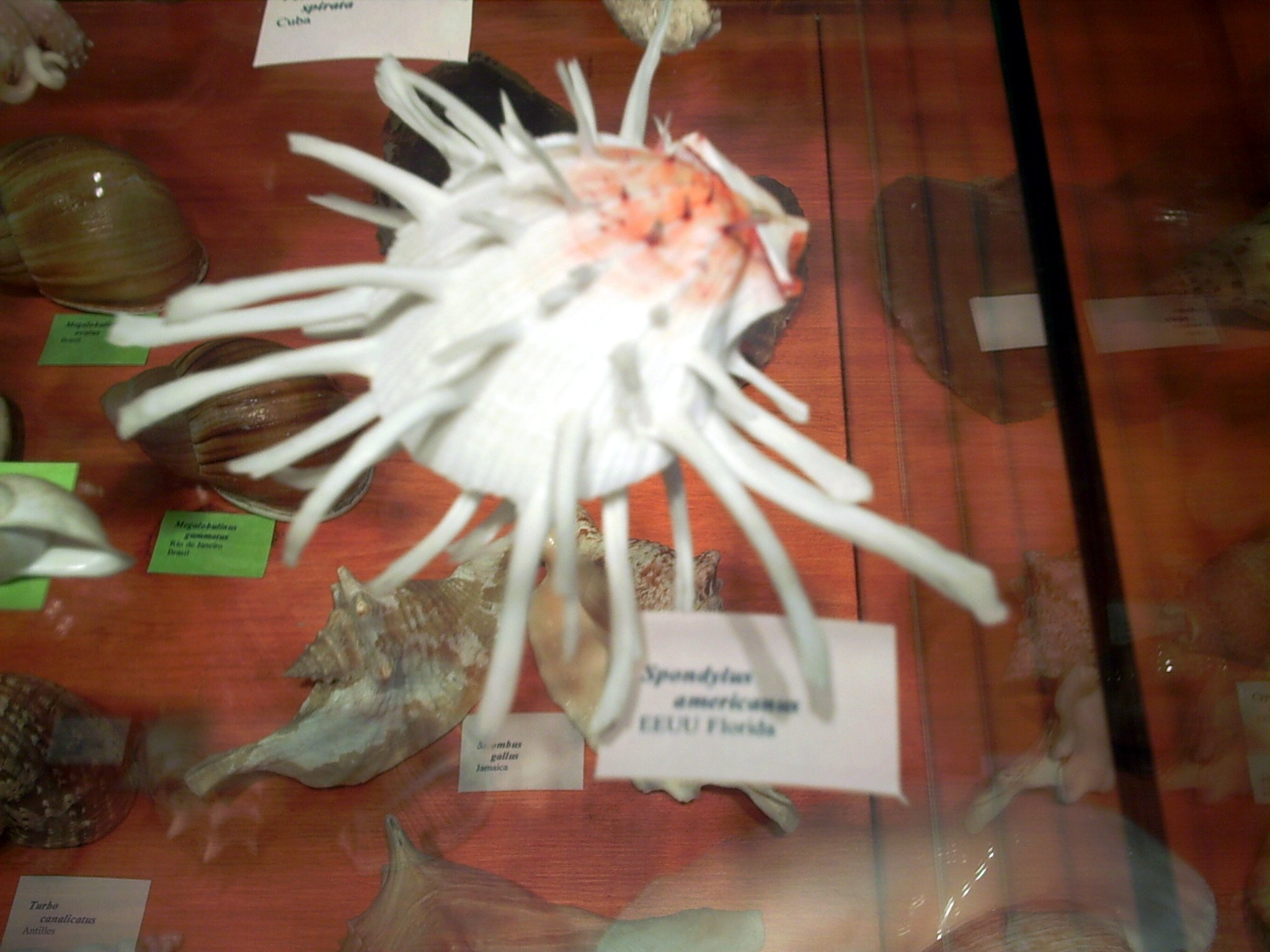
Spondylus, from Florida

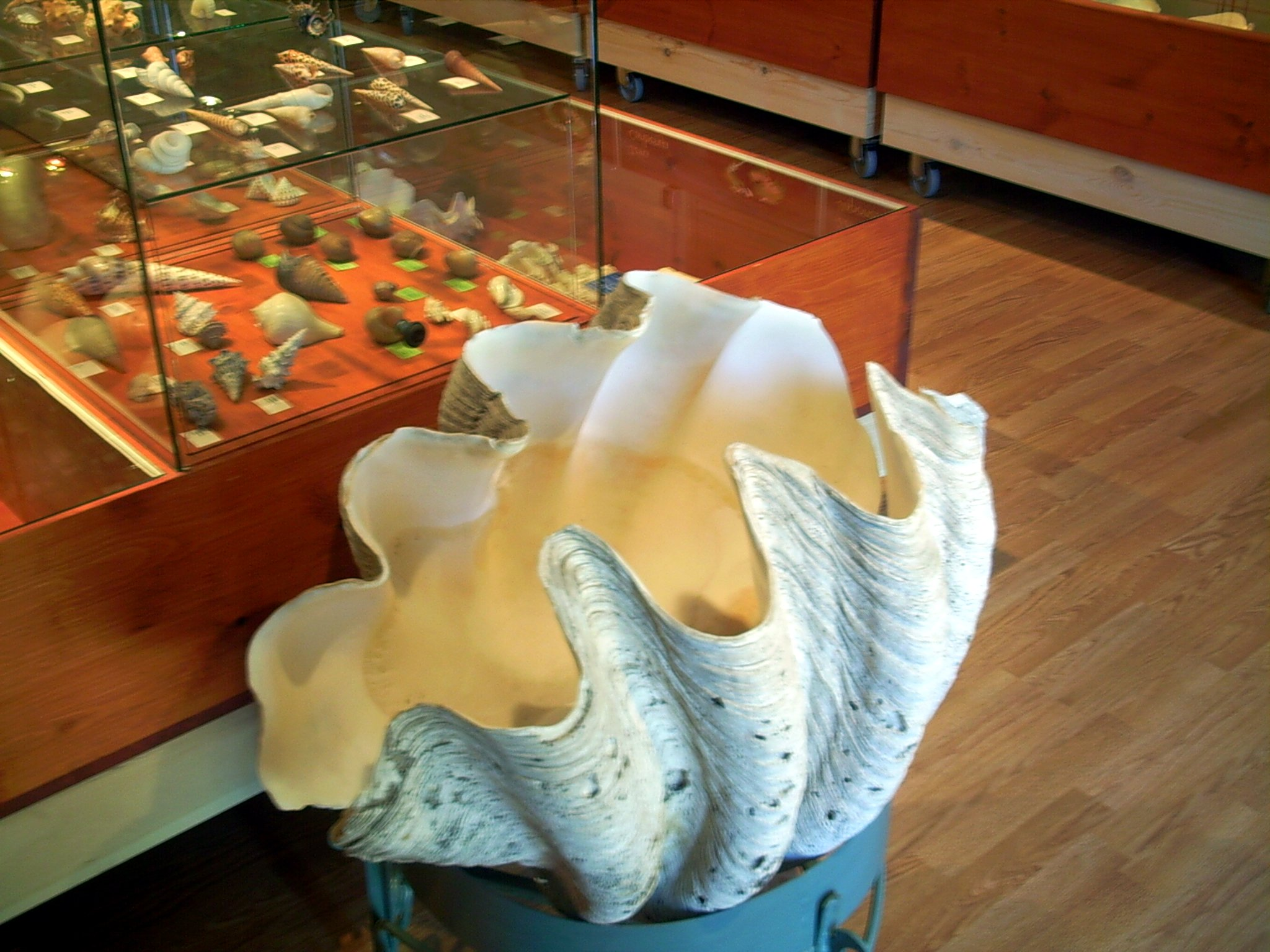
Tridacna gigas, the giant clam

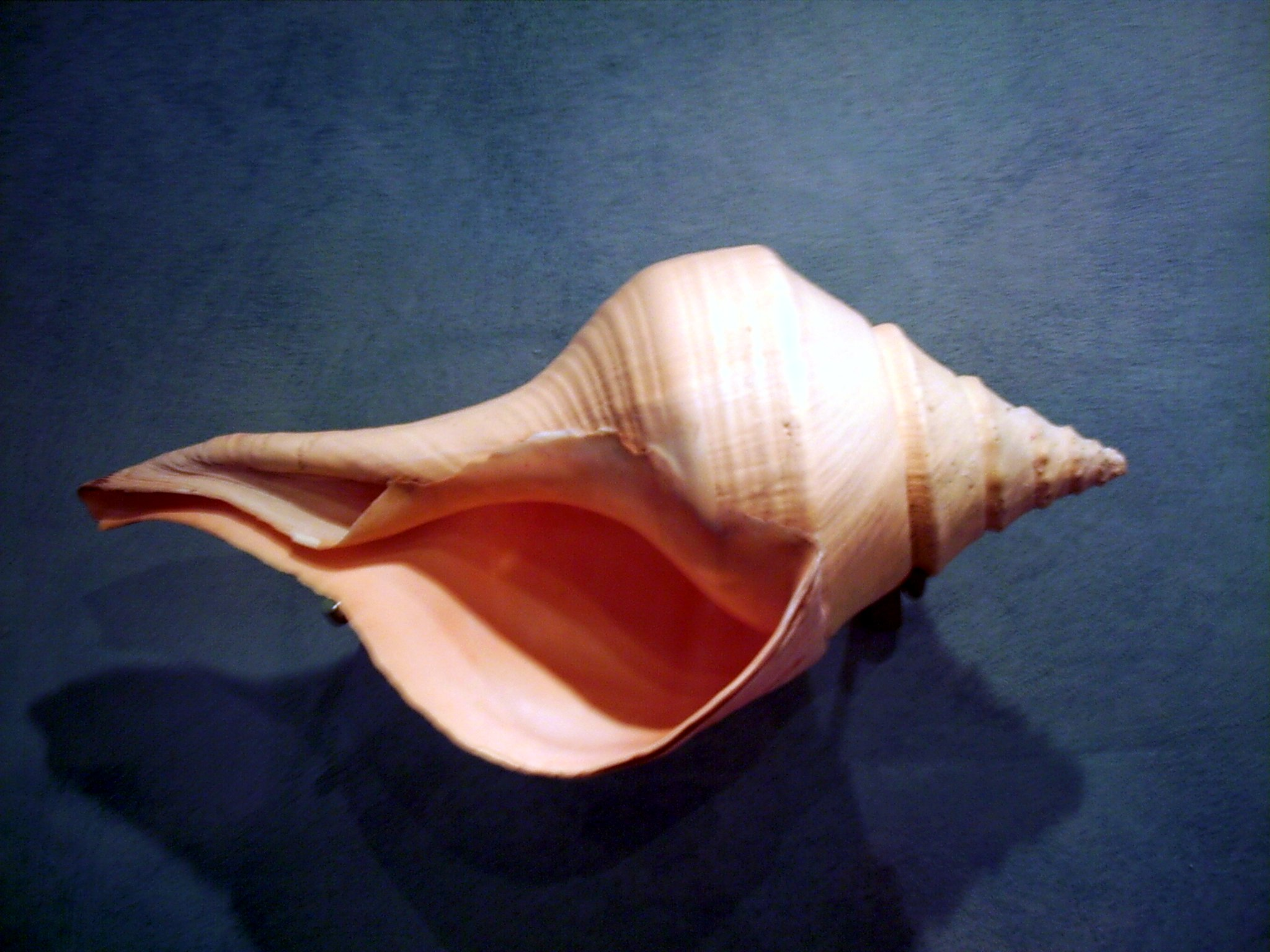
Syrinx aruanus

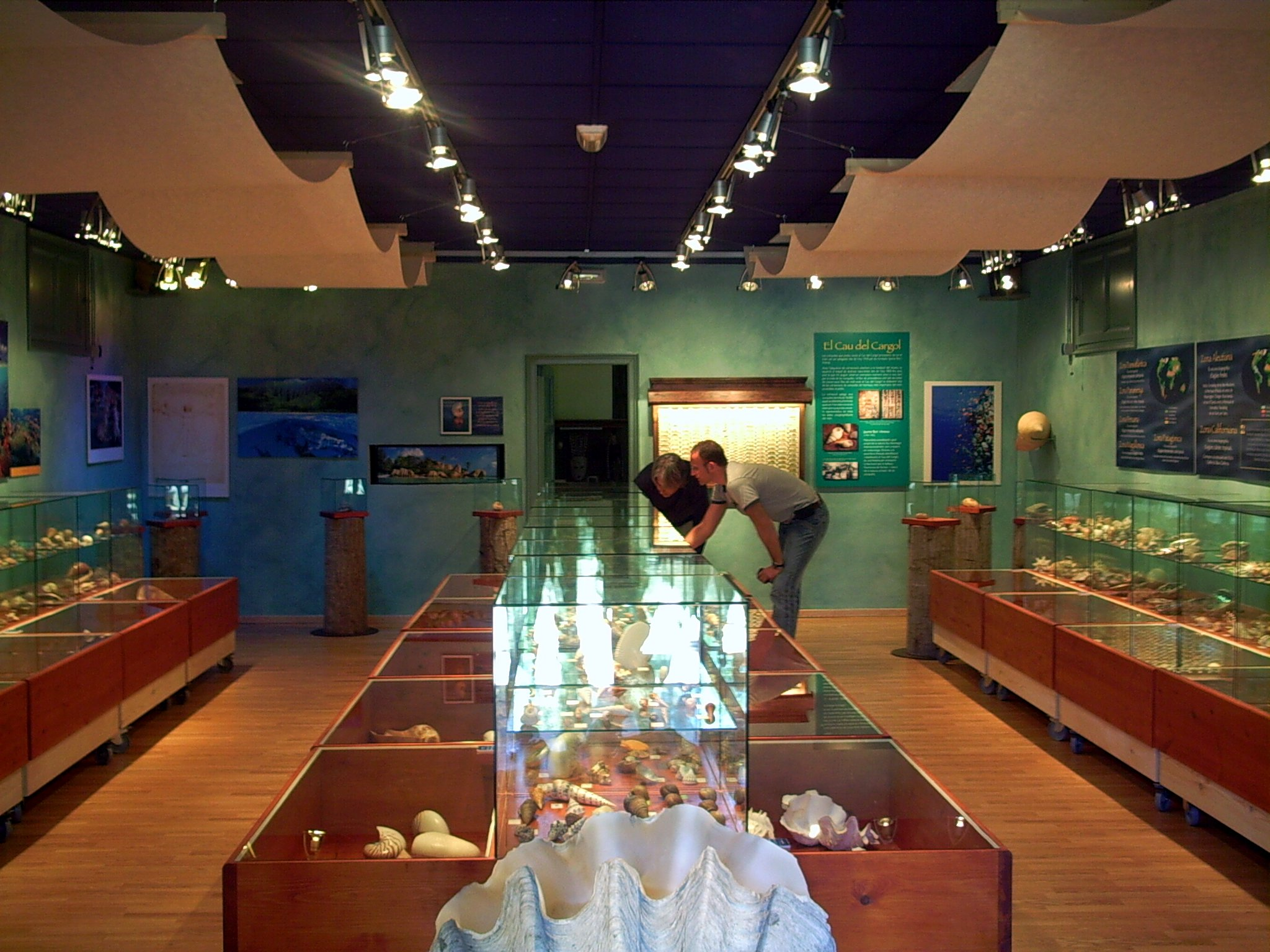
Inside the museum

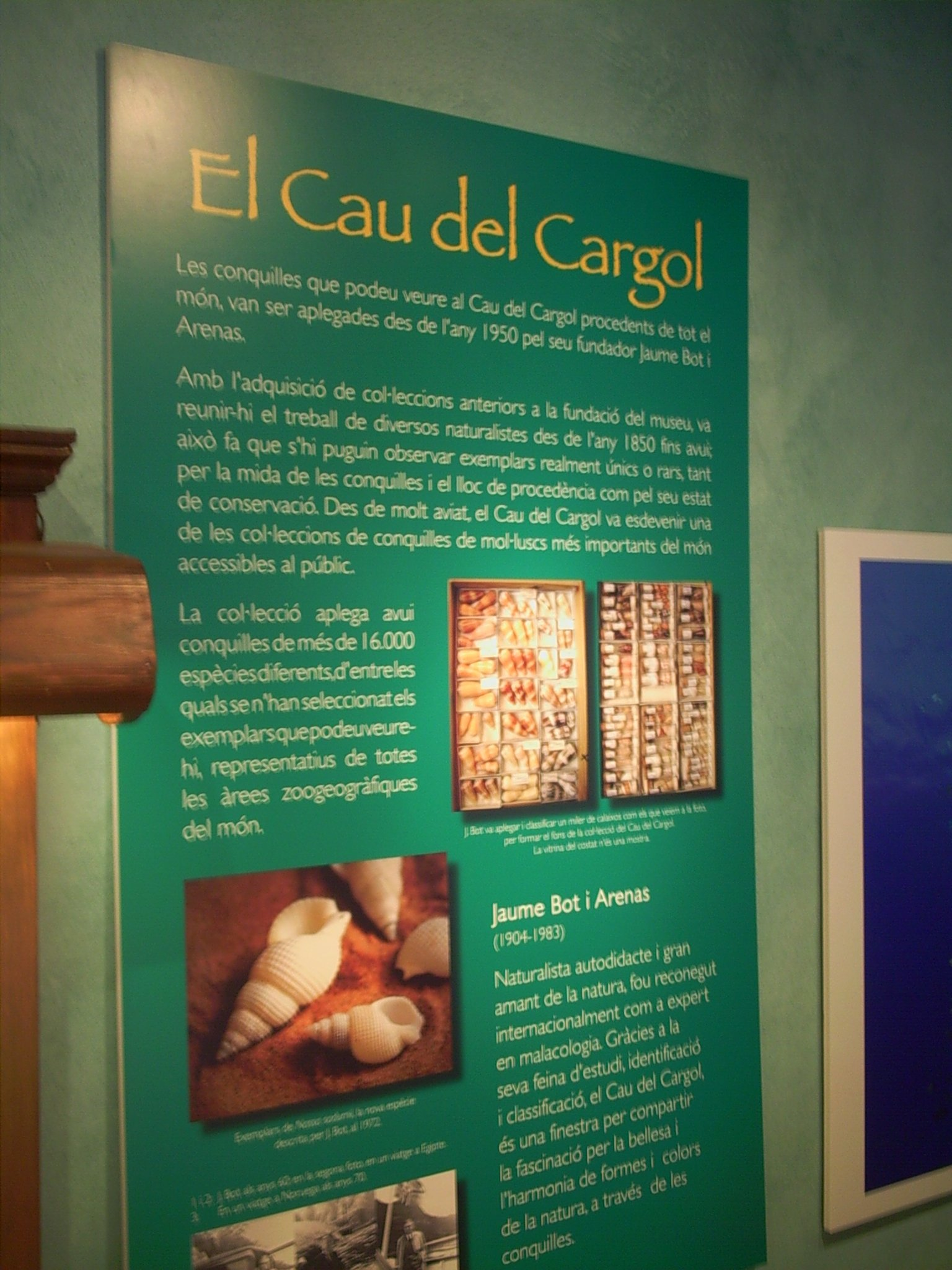
Introductory panel

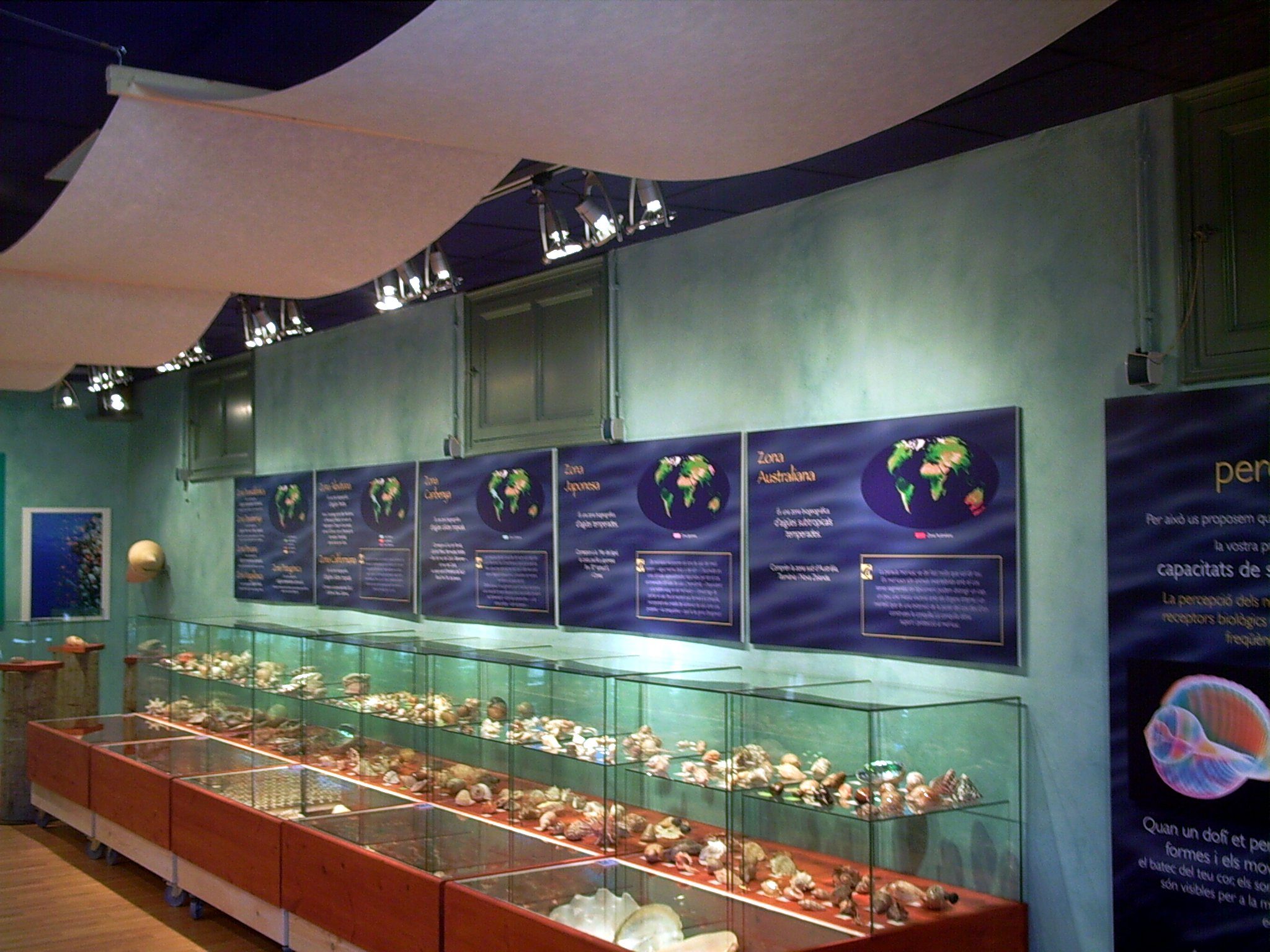
Right side panels

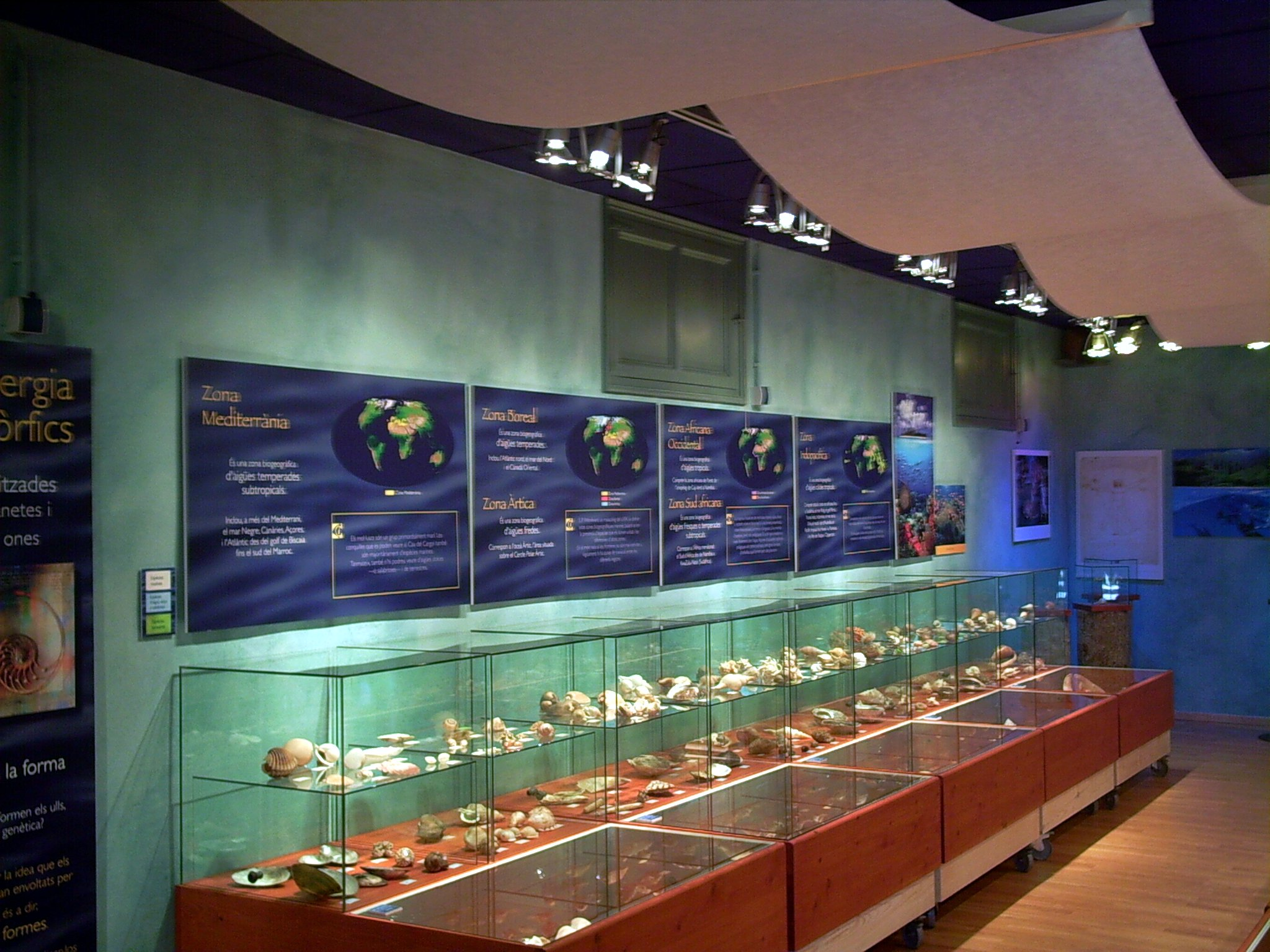
Left side panels

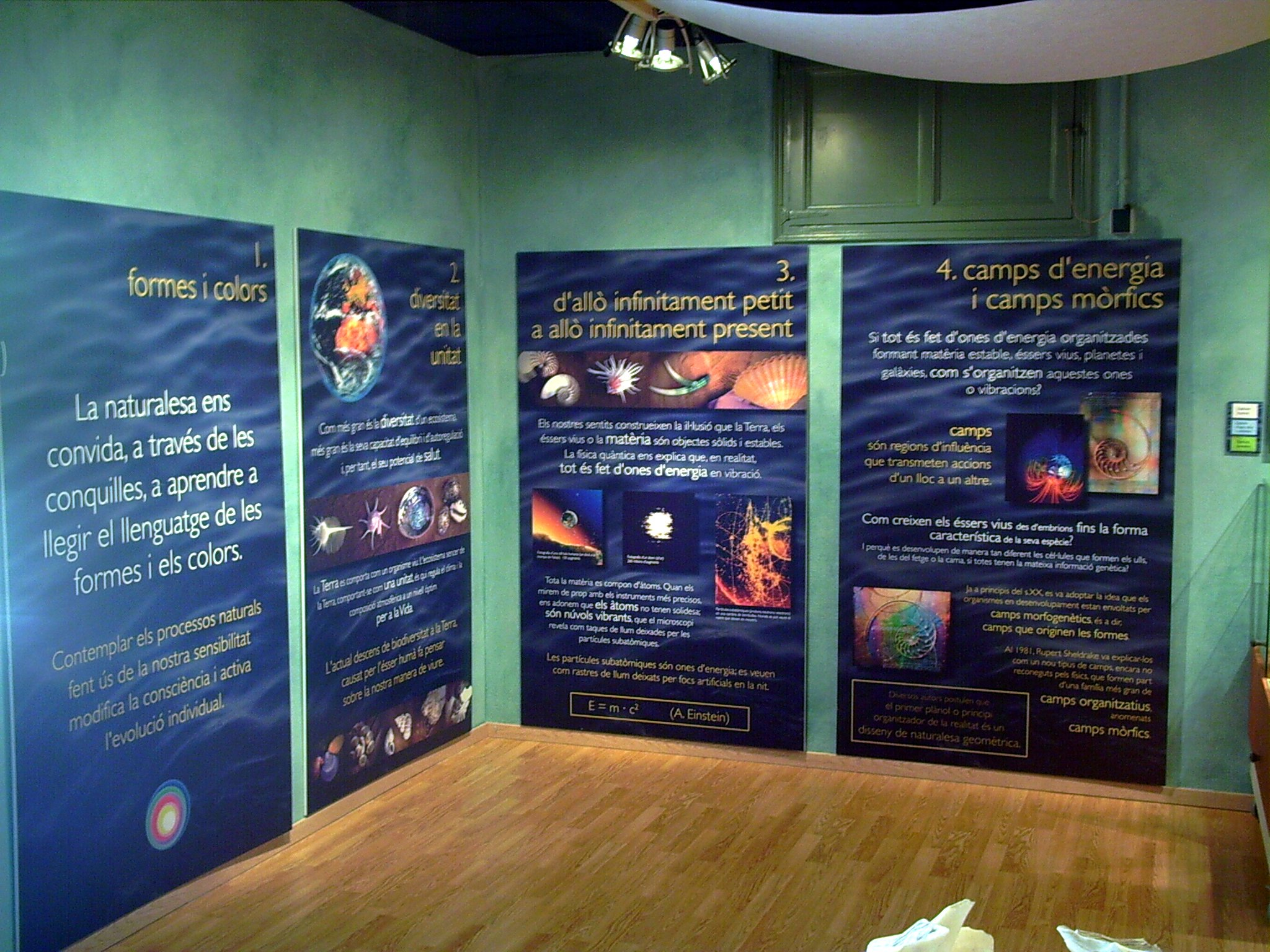
Panels 1 to 4

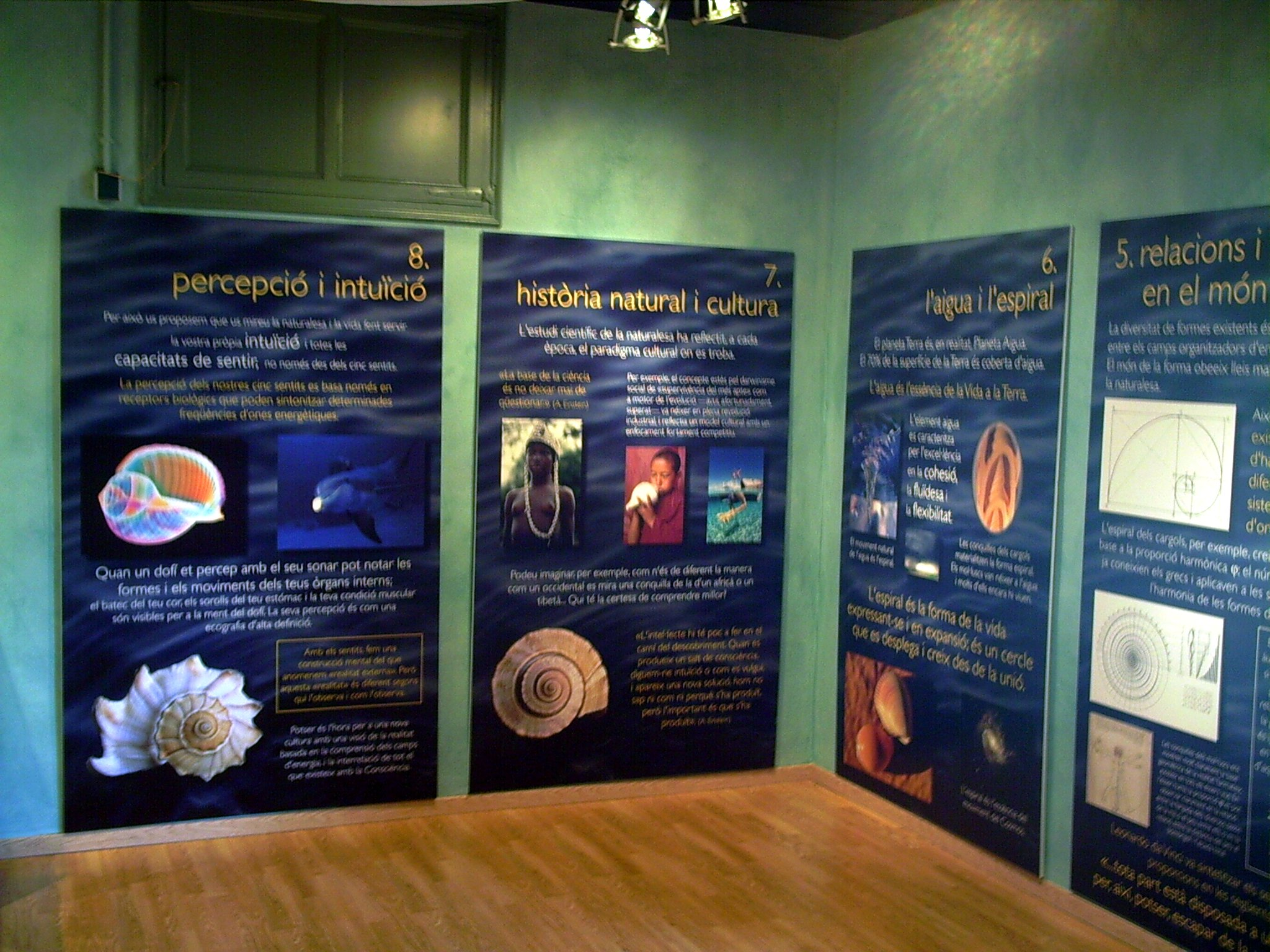
Panels 5 to 8

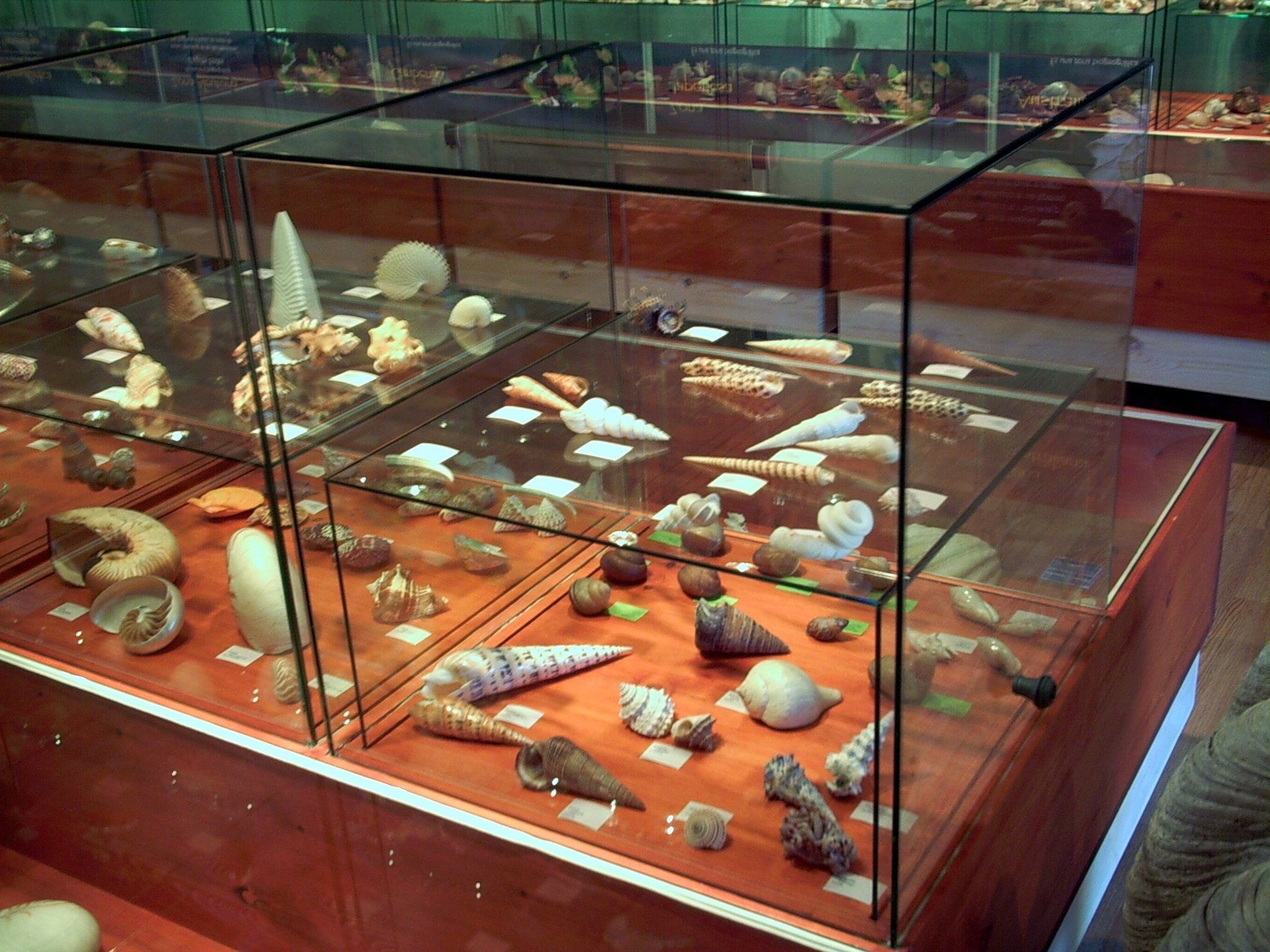
Indo-Pacific fauna showcase

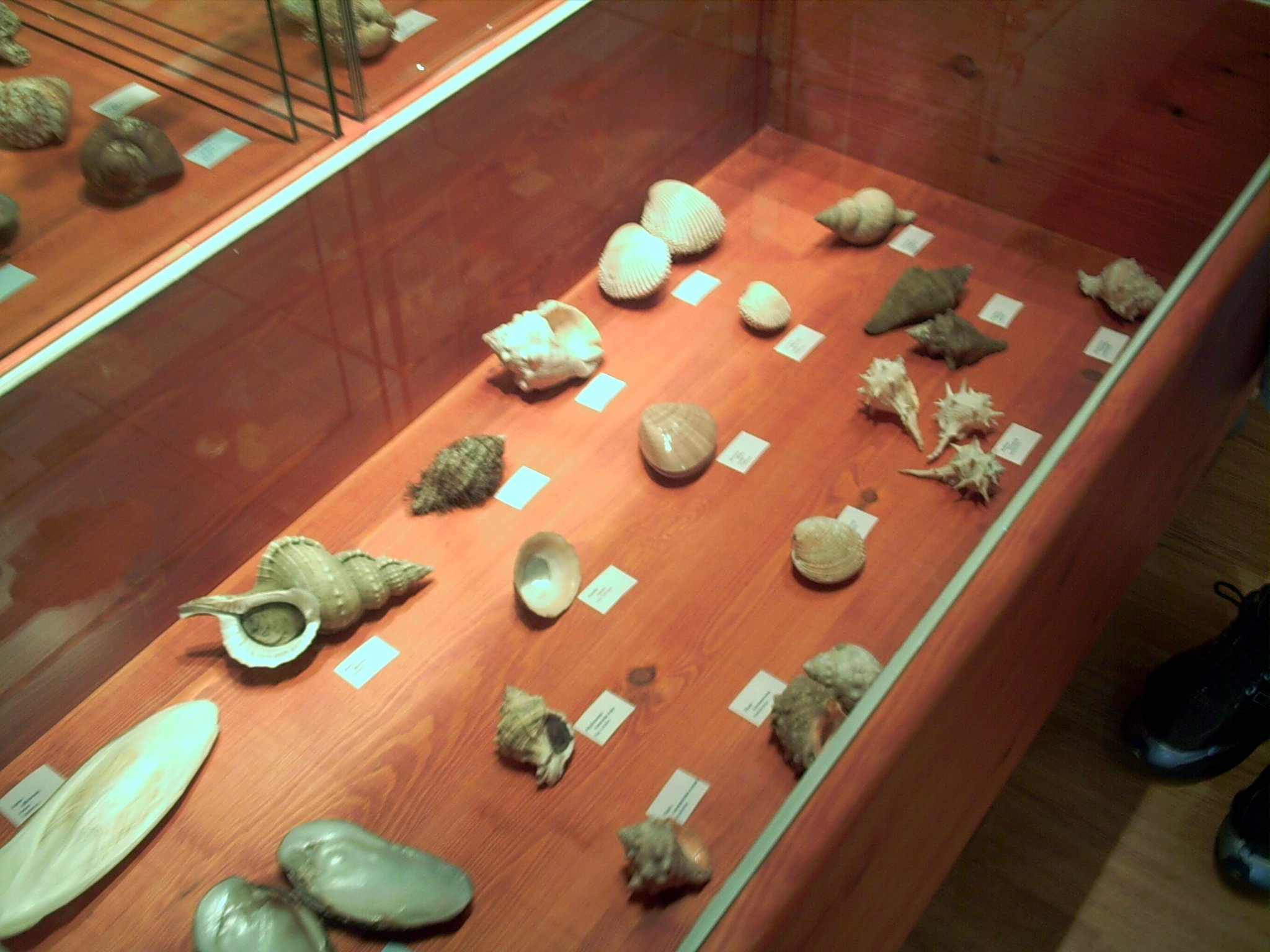
Mediterranean fauna showcase

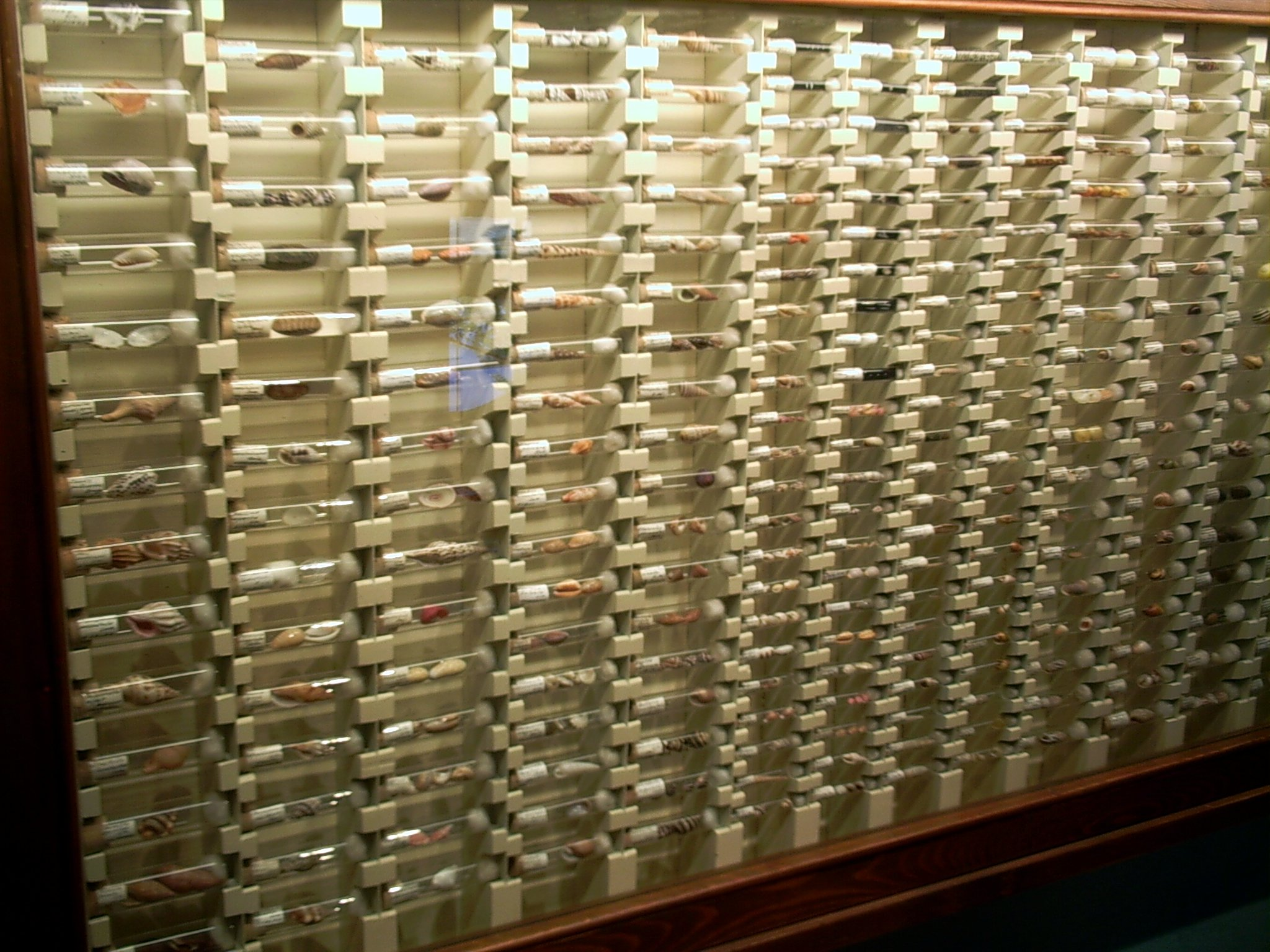
Showcase of small shells

== See also ==
- Malacology, the branch of invertebrate zoology which deals with the study of molluscs
- Seashell
- Conchology, the study of mollusc shells
