= Roman ovens of the Fornaca =

Ancient Roman structures in Spain

Coordinates: 41.5160°N 2.3680°E

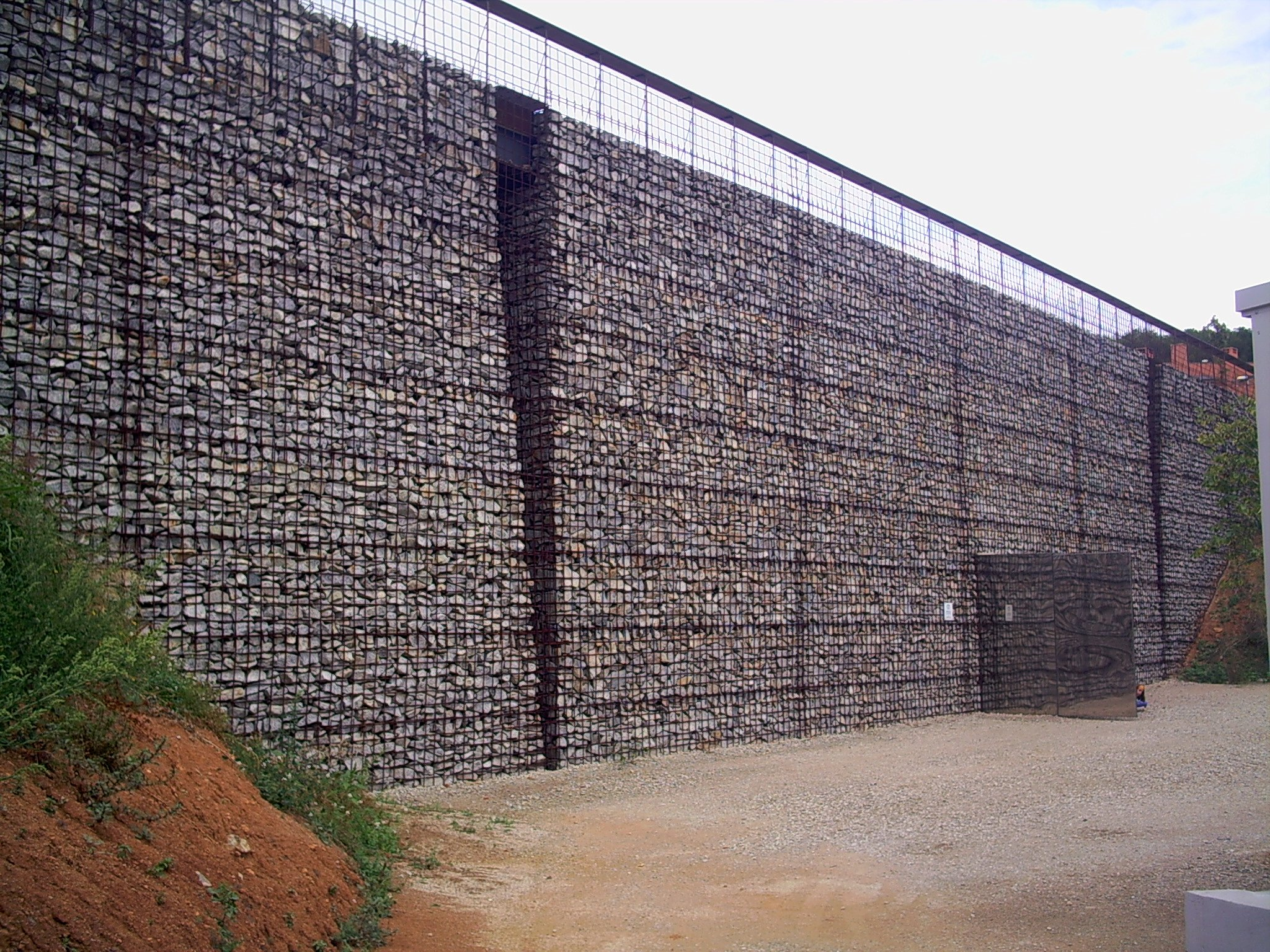
Catalonia VilassarDeDalt FornsRomansFornaca RecinteExterior

The Roman ovens of the Fornaca are ancient Roman structures in the archaeological site of Fornaca at Vilassar de Dalt, Catalonia, Spain. They were used for the industrial production of large ceramic materials. Based on their typology, the materials found in the excavation, and study of their magnetic properties, archaeologists have dated the ovens 1 and 2 to the 1st and 2nd centuries AD.

The name Fornaca, documented for the first time in 1290 at the castle of Speculum Vilassar, gives clues about the antiquity of the area of industrial production.
