= Julio Díaz (footballer, born 1948) =

Spanish footballer and coach

Personal information
- Full name: Julio Díaz Sánchez
- Date of birth: 16 April 1948 (age 78)
- Place of birth: Cesuras, Spain
- Position: Defender

Senior career*
Years	Team	Apps	(Gls)
1969–1970	Compostela		
1972–1976	Ceuta		
1976–1977	Díter Zafra		
1977–1979	Compostela		

Managerial career
- Atlético Ribeira
- 1985–1987: Lalín
- 1987–1988: Bergantiños
- 1988–1989: Lugo
- 1990–1992: Lugo
- 1995–1997: Pontevedra
- 2000–2001: Lugo
- 2001–2002: Lugo
- 2007–2008: Negreira
- * Club domestic league appearances and goals

Julio Díaz Sánchez (born 16 April 1948) is a Spanish football coach and former player.

== Managerial career ==
Díaz was born in Cesuras, A Coruña, Galicia, and played for SD Compostela, AD Ceuta and CD Díter Zafra. As a manager, he achieved an incredible run in the 1987–88 Copa del Rey with Bergantiños FC, only being knocked out by Rayo Vallecano.

In 1988 Díaz was appointed CD Lugo manager. He was sacked the following year, but eventually returned to the club in 1990.

In 2000, after a stint at Pontevedra CF, Díaz returned to the Albivermellos, and despite leaving the club at the end of the campaign, was again appointed on 19 September 2001. He was sacked in December 2002, and ended his spell at the club with 214 matches in charge, behind only Quique Setién.

On 14 March 2007, Díaz was named SD Negreira manager. Roughly one year later, he was dismissed.
