= Pablo Rodríguez (footballer, born 1975) =

Spanish footballer

Personal information
- Full name: Pablo Jesús Rodríguez Méndez
- Date of birth: 7 June 1975 (age 51)
- Place of birth: Viveiro, Spain
- Height: 1.74 m (5 ft 8 1/2 in)
- Position: Midfielder

Youth career
- Viveiro

Senior career*
Years	Team	Apps	(Gls)
1994–1995	Deportivo B		
1995–1997	Viveiro		
1997–1999	Lugo	66	(9)
1999–2004	Racing Ferrol	113	(20)
2004	Girona	9	(0)
2005	Leganés	8	(0)
2005–2008	Lugo	72	(11)
2009	Atlético Baleares	7	(0)
2009	Compostela	0	(0)
2009–2010	As Pontes		
Total		275	(40)
- * Club domestic league appearances and goals

Pablo Jesús Rodríguez Méndez (born 7 June 1975 in Viveiro, Lugo, Galicia) is a Spanish former footballer who played as a midfielder.
