= 1973–74 Copa del Generalísimo =

72nd Copa del Rey

Tournament details
- Country: Spain
- Teams: 114

Final positions
- Champions: Real Madrid (12th title)
- Runners-up: FC Barcelona

Tournament statistics
- Matches played: 225

The 1973–74 Copa del Generalísimo was the 72nd staging of the Spanish Cup. The competition began on 26 September 1973 and concluded on 28 June 1974 with the final.

== First round ==
Team 1	Agg.	Team 2	1st leg	2nd leg
CD Basconia	3–4	CD Alavés	2–2	1–2
SD Eibar	1–2	SD Erandio	0–0	1–2
Sestao SC	1–3	CD Logroñés	0–1	1–2
CD Mirandés	1–0	Bilbao Athletic	1–0	0–0
Zamora CF	1–3	Palencia CF	1–0	0–3
Atlético Madrileño	5–3	CD Valdepeñas	4–1	1–2
Calvo Sotelo CF	2–2 (5–4 (p.))	CD Getafe	2–0	0–2
Racing Ferrol	7–3	CD Lugo	5–1	2–2
Cultural Leonesa	2–1	SD Ponferradina	2–0	0–1
Real Avilés CF	1–3	Caudal Deportivo	0–1	1–2
UP Langreo	3–1	UD Gijón Industrial	3–1	0–0
Rayo Cantabria	2–1	Gimnástica de Torrelavega	2–1	0–0
CA Osasuna Promesas	2–1	CD Peña Sport	1–0	1–1
CD Salmantino	1–2	Castilla CF	1–0	0–2
CD Tudelano	4–1	UD Barbastro	4–0	0–1
CD Guadalajara	0–5	CD Colonia Moscardó	0–2	0–3
CD Pegaso	4–5	CD Carabanchel	1–3	3–2
CD Atlético Ciudadela	5–5 (3–5 (p.))	CD Menorca	3–2	2–3
SD Ibiza (Note: SD Ibiza refused to play extra-time because they thought they were the winners by the away goals rule. It was considered a voluntary withdrawal by the Federation and they were eliminated.)	2–2	CD Manacor	0–0	2–2
CP Cacereño	1–1 (5–4 (p.))	CD Badajoz	1–0	0–1
CD San Fernando	1–2	Recreativo de Huelva	1–0	0–2
RB Linense	2–2 (3–2 (p.))	Racing Club Portuense	1–0	1–2
AD Ceuta	13–2	Melilla Industrial CF	10–1	3–1
Melilla CF	4–2	CD O'Donnell	3–1	1–1
AD Almería	3–2	CA Marbella	3–2	0–0
Xerez CD	2–3	Real Jaén	2–0	0–3
Club Lemos	1–3	Pontevedra CF	1–1	0–2
CD Cartagena	3–2	Orihuela Deportiva CF	2–1	1–1
Hellín Deportivo	2–3	CD Eldense	1–1	1–2
CD Alcoyano	5–1	Olímpico de Játiva	4–1	1–0
UD Alcira	2–1	Onteniente CF	2–0	0–1
Villarreal CF	3–1	Vinaroz CF	2–1	1–0
CD Europa	2–5	CD Tortosa	2–1	0–4
UD Lérida	3–0	Gerona CF	2–0	1–0
CF Gandía	3–1	CD Mestalla	2–0	1–1
Tarrassa CF	0–1	Barcelona Atlético	0–0	0–1

- Bye: CD Guecho, CF Calella, UD Mahón and CD Ensidesa.

== Second round ==
Team 1	Agg.	Team 2	1st leg	2nd leg
CD Carabanchel	1–2	Castilla CF	0–0	1–2
Villarreal CF	3–1	UD Alcira	2–0	1–1
CD Guecho	2–0	CA Osasuna Promesas	2–0	0–0
CD Logroñés	2–2 (5–2 (p.))	CD Mirandés	2–0	0–2
Cultural Leonesa	5–2	Palencia CF	2–0	3–2
Atlético Madrileño	3–1	Calvo Sotelo CF	0–0	3–1
CF Gandía	1–5	CD Cartagena	1–0	0–5
CD Eldense	0–2	CD Alcoyano	0–0	0–2
CD Alavés	1–3	SD Erandio	1–1	0–2
Racing Ferrol	4–3	Pontevedra CF	2–1	2–2
CD Tudelano	2–3	UD Lérida	1–1	1–2
CP Cacereño	1–2	CD Colonia Moscardó	1–1	0–1
CD Tortosa	2–5	CF Calella	2–2	0–3
CD Manacor	1–2	Barcelona Atlético	0–1	1–1
CD Menorca	2–5	UD Mahón	1–1	1–4
Real Jaén	0–3	Recreativo de Huelva	0–2	0–1
RB Linense	2–4	AD Ceuta	0–1	2–3
Melilla CF	3–5	AD Almería	2–2	1–3
Rayo Cantabria	0–2	UP Langreo	0–0	0–2
Caudal Deportivo	1–2	CD Ensidesa	1–1	0–1

== Third round ==
Team 1	Agg.	Team 2	1st leg	2nd leg
Atlético Madrileño	1–2	CD San Andrés	1–0	0–2
Barcelona Atlético	5–5 (5–4 (p.))	CD Orense	2–2	3–3
Burgos CF	3–2	CD Ensidesa	1–1	2–1
Cádiz CF	1–3	CD Colonia Moscardó	1–1	0–2
Castilla CF	1–3	Baracaldo CF	0–1	1–2
Córdoba CF	5–3	AD Ceuta	4–2	1–1
SD Erandio	2–4	Sevilla CF	1–2	1–2
CD Guecho	4–3	RCD Mallorca	3–0	1–3
Hércules CF	3–1	CD Logroñés	2–0	1–1
Recreativo de Huelva	0–1	CD Sabadell CF	0–0	0–1
UP Langreo	4–3	CA Osasuna	3–1	1–2
Cultural Leonesa	3–3 (1–3 (p.))	Deportivo La Coruña	2–1	1–2
Levante UD	1–1 (4–2 (p.))	CD Cartagena	1–1	0–0
Linares CF	0–2	AD Almería	0–1	0–1
UD Mahón	1–2	Gimnástico de Tarragona	1–1	0–1
Racing de Ferrol	1–1 (3–4 (p.))	Rayo Vallecano	1–1	0–0
UD Salamanca	4–1	CD Alcoyano	3–0	1–1
CD Tenerife	8–2	UD Lérida	4–0	4–2
Real Valladolid	2–3	CF Calella	2–0	0–3
Villarreal CF	1–4	Real Betis Balompié	1–2	0–2

Source: RSSSF

== Fourth round ==
Team 1	Agg.	Team 2	1st leg	2nd leg
AD Almería	3–5	Real Oviedo	2–1	1–4
Baracaldo CF	2–5	UD Las Palmas	1–0	1–5
CF Calella	1–2	Athletic Club de Bilbao	1–0	0–2
Celta Vigo	3–1	CD Guecho	2–0	1–1
Córdoba CF	3–4	CD Tenerife	3–0	0–4
Deportivo La Coruña	0–6	Racing de Santander	0–3	0–3
Elche CF	3–2	UD Salamanca	2–1	1–1
Granada CF	5–4	Burgos CF	5–1	0–3
Hércules CF	1–3	Rayo Vallecano	0–1	1–2
UP Langreo	0–3	Real Betis Balompié	0–1	0–2
Levante UD	5–4	Barcelona Atlético	5–1	0–3
CD Málaga	1–1 (4–3 (p.))	Sevilla CF	0–0	1–1
CD Colonia Moscardó	3–5	Real Murcia	2–2	1–3
CD San Andrés	4–2	Gimnástico de Tarragona	4–1	0–1

Source: RSSSF

- Bye: CD Sabadell CF and Sporting de Gijón.

== Fifth round ==
Team 1	Agg.	Team 2	1st leg	2nd leg
Athletic Bilbao	1–3	Real Murcia	1–0	0–3
Celta Vigo	1–2	Rayo Vallecano	1–0	0–2
Levante UD	2–6	Granada CF	2–1	0–5
CD Málaga	1–1 (3–4 (p.))	Real Oviedo	0–0	1–1
Racing de Santander	0–2	CD Sabadell CF	0–0	0–2
CD San Andrés	5–0	Elche CF	4–0	1–0
Sporting Gijón	4–4 (3–4 (p.))	UD Las Palmas	3–2	1–2
CD Tenerife	1–3	Real Betis	1–1	0–2

Source: RSSSF

== Round of 16 ==
Team 1	Agg.	Team 2	1st leg	2nd leg
Atlético Madrid	6–1	CD Sabadell CF	3–1	3–0
Real Betis	2–8	Real Madrid	1–1	1–7
Granada CF	2–1	CD Castellón	2–1	0–0
UD Las Palmas	3–0	Real Sociedad	1–0	2–0
Real Murcia	5–8	Real Zaragoza	3–1	2–7
Real Oviedo	3–7	CF Barcelona	2–3	1–4
CD San Andrés	1–3	RCD Español	1–2	0–1
Valencia CF	6–1	Rayo Vallecano	3–1	3–0

Source: RSSSF

== Quarter-finals ==
Team 1	Agg.	Team 2	1st leg	2nd leg
Atlético Madrid	3–2	Real Zaragoza	2–0	1–2
RCD Español	1–3	CF Barcelona	1–1	0–2
Granada CF	3–7	Real Madrid	0–0	3–7
Valencia CF	0–2	UD Las Palmas	0–0	0–2

Source: RSSSF

== Semi-finals ==
Team 1	Agg.	Team 2	1st leg	2nd leg
FC Barcelona	3–2	Club Atlético de Madrid	1–1	2–1
Real Madrid CF	7–1	UD Las Palmas	5–0	2–1

Source: RSSSF

== Final ==
Team 1	Score	Team 2
Real Madrid CF	4–0	FC Barcelona

Copa del Generalísimo
winners
Real Madrid
12th title
