= Archive of the Marquises of Santa Maria de Barberà =

Archive in Catalonia

Coordinates: 41.5177°N 2.3563°E

The Archive of the Marquises of Santa Maria de Barberà (AMSMB) is the most important heritage archive in Catalonia, located in the castle of the Marquises of Santa Maria de Barberà in Vilassar de Dalt, Spain.

== Castle ==
The Castell de Vilassar dates back to the 10th century as a fortress, with significant enlargements and additions of architectural features in the 13th, 14th, and 15th centuries as it was converted from a military structure into a palace.

It is currently owned by Ramon de Sarriera i Fernández de Muniaín and his wife Marcela Bernat Valenzuela, current Marquises of Santa Maria de Barberà, who carried out the relevant works in the restoration and rehabilitation of both the castle, the gardens and the archive itself, the furniture, and the works of art. Since 1931, the castle has been classified as a historic-artistic monument (conjunto histórico), which is a subclass of Bien de Interés Cultural.

== Archives ==
The archive is composed of documents from the 10th century, in County Catalonia, starting with 858, with documentation of several aristocratic houses incorporated by inheritance and marriage policy. The first cataloging and digitization of the parchment collection was done under the direction of Dra. Coral Cuadrada, continuing with the conservation and preservation of the manuscripts and bindings funds, made thanks to an agreement with Columbia University and then with the University of Texas. With the third phase, a digitization and archival description is being carried out, transferring the data obtained to a document management program.

The archives holds about 11,257 scrolls, more than 2,000 manuscripts and 457.2 linear meters of bindings. The AMSMB was created in the 19th century, at the Palau Solterra in Barcelona, and in the 20th century it moved to the Castle of the Marquises of Santa Maria de Barberà, in Vilassar de Dalt (Maresme). These fonds include those of the Baronies of Vilassar, Cervelló and Santa Pau; those of the Llull, Pinós, Sureda-Santmartí, Sarriera, Santcliment, Solterra, Boixadors, Copons, Ivorra, Babau and Alentorn lineages. And among the documentary typology of the collections there are scrolls, the urban patriciate of Barcelona, plans, maps and genealogies, and printed books. The Llull collection has more than 300 scrolls, paper documentation of all kinds, manuscripts and printed books. In addition, of the will granted on April 26, 2013, and which is in the same AMSMB for reasons of descent from the medieval Llulls. This will was made known by Francesc de Bofarull i Sans (director of the Archive of the Crown of Aragon from 1893 to 1991), in his report of January 15, 1894, read at the Reial Acadèmia de Bones Lletres de Barcelona, as well as other documents relating to the Escola Lulliana de Barcelona (in the 15th century), which are also preserved at the AMSMB.
