= Eduard Núñez =

Dominican Republic footballer (born 1991)

Personal information
- Full name: Eduard Marcel Núñez Mejía
- Date of birth: 21 May 1991 (age 35)
- Place of birth: Santo Domingo, Dominican Republic
- Position: Left-back

Senior career*
| Years | Team | Apps | (Gls) |
| 2011 | CE Premià | 5 | (0) |
| 2012 | CE Vilassar de Dalt | 1 | (0) |
| 2012 | AE La Salle Premià B | 1 | (0) |
| 2012–2013 | AE La Salle Premià | 17 | (4) |
| 2013–2014 | CE Vilassar de Dalt | 22 | (2) |

International career
| 2014– | Dominican Republic | 1 | (0) |
- * Club domestic league appearances and goals as of 26 November 2010

Eduard Marcel Núñez Mejía (born 21 May 1991 in Santo Domingo) is a Dominican football player who recently played for CE Vilassar de Dalt.

He is the younger brother of Pedro Antonio Núñez and the half-brother of Mariano Díaz Mejía.

== International career ==
Edu is a defender and he has made a cap in the Dominican Republic.
