= Albert Stroni =

Albanian footballer (born 1971)

Personal information
- Full name: Albert Stroni
- Date of birth: 18 November 1971 (age 54)
- Place of birth: Fier, Albania
- Height: 1.84 m (6 ft 0 in)
- Position: Striker

Senior career*
Years	Team	Apps	(Gls)
1988–1990	Dinamo Tirana	35	(13)
1990–1992	Apolonia Fier	33	(4)
1992	Partizan	5	(0)
1993	Dinamo Tirana	26	(13)
1993–1994	Compostela	0	(0)
1994–1995	Ourense	0	(0)
1995–1998	Club Lemos	99	(58)
1998–1999	Ponte Ourense	36	(22)
1999–2000	Gimnástica Segoviana	5	(0)
2000	Maia	1	(0)
2000	Mérida	14	(10)
2001	Don Benito	13	(2)
2001–2002	Angers	12	(1)
2002–2006	Club Lemos		
2006–2007	Lalín		

International career
1987	Albania U-18	2	(0)
1990	Albania U-21	3	(0)
1988	Albania	1	(0)
- * Club domestic league appearances and goals

Albert Stroni (born 18 November 1971) is an Albanian retired footballer who played primarily as a striker.

== Club career ==
Born in Fier, Stroni soon showed skills as a prolific striker in his homeland, playing for Dinamo Tirana and Apolonia Fier and being instrumental in the former side's double in the 1989–90 season.

In 1992, Stroni moved to FR Yugoslavia to play for FK Partizan but, after being vastly overlooked, he returned home to Dinamo Tirana. In the following summer he switched to Spain, where he would spend most of his remaining years as a footballer: he started with SD Compostela but, because of bureaucratic reasons, ended not playing a single league match for the club, after which he joined Galician neighbours CD Ourense also in the second division, where he also did not manage to appear officially.

Subsequently, Stroni signed with amateurs Club Lemos in the same autonomous community, eventually becoming one of the most important players in the club's history, averaging more than one goal every two games and first promoting them to the fourth level. After three seasons, he played one year with another amateur – and Galician – side, Ponte Ourense, and another in Gimnástica Segoviana CF.

Stroni would represent three teams in 2000–01, starting in Portugal with F.C. Maia then returning to Spain to play for Mérida UD and CD Don Benito. In the following campaign he signed with French team Angers SCO but, after a poor year, returned again to Spain and Lemos, for a further four years and another fourth-tier promotion (in his last season he acted as player-coach, and scored a total of 105 competitive goals in his two spells). The 35-year-old retired in 2007, after one season with another team in division four, CD Lalín.

After retiring, Stroni relocated in Ourense, where he opened a car stand. Shortly after, however, he accepted the offer to manage Lemos, who faced the possibility of folding.

== International career ==
Stroni represented the Albania national team on 35 occasions, all categories counted. After appearing for the Albania U21 – during that team's trip to Spain, he fled and requested right of asylum – he went on to gain three caps for the senior side.

For the main senior Albanian team he played one game in 1988.

== Honours ==
Dinamo Tirana

- Albanian Superliga: 1989–90
- Albanian Cup: 1988–89, 1989–90
- Albanian Supercup: 1989

Partizan

- First League of FR Yugoslavia: 1992–93

Individual

- Albanian Superliga: MVP 1990–91
