= Carlos Ballesta =

Spanish footballer and manager

Personal information
- Full name: Carlos Alberto Ballesta Edreira
- Date of birth: 14 January 1955 (age 71)
- Place of birth: Oleiros, Spain
- Position: Defender

Senior career*
Years	Team	Apps	(Gls)
1975–1985	Deportivo La Coruña	202	(3)

Managerial career
- 1986–1995: Deportivo La Coruña (assistant)
- 1995–1999: Deportivo B
- 1999–2000: Deportivo La Coruña (assistant)
- 2000–2001: Compostela
- 2003–2004: Calahorra
- 2004–2005: Lugo
- * Club domestic league appearances and goals

Carlos Alberto Ballesta Edreira (born 14 January 1955) is a Spanish retired footballer who played as a defender, and a current manager.
