= Club Lemos =

Spanish football team

Lemos
- Full name: Club Lemos
- Nickname: Los Lemistas
- Founded: 1924; 102 years ago
- Stadium: Campo Municipal A Pinguela
- Capacity: 1,100
- President: Antonio López
- Head coach: Alberto López
- League: Preferente Futgal – Group 2
- 2025–26: Preferente Futgal – Group 2, 4th of 18
Home colours	Away colours

Club Lemos is a Spanish football team based in Monforte de Lemos, in the Province of Lugo in the autonomous community of Galicia. Founded in 1924, it is the second oldest club in the Province of Lugo and the seventh oldest in Galicia. It plays in Preferente Futgal – Group 2, holding home matches at Campo Municipal A Pinguela.

It has played 51 seasons in the Tercera División, with 30 of those being during the time when that was the third division of Spanish football, making it the team with the second-most appearances in that category. It has also made six appearances in the Copa del Rey, the last of those being in 1983.

== History ==
=== Founding and early years ===
The team was founded on April 19, 1924 in Monforte de Lemos in a meeting held at the Teatro Principal. It was born out of the merging of Atlétic Club and Monforte FC through mutual agreement. The meeting was chaired by José Ibáñez Fernández, the last president of Atlétic Club, who served as acting president, with Francisco Álvarez González as secretary. The club began life under the name Sociedad Deportiva y de Cultura Física Lemos Club, and took Ramón Taboada Zúñiga as their first president. They also had a new stadium, Stadium Lemos, located on the highway towards Ourense, that replaced the old grounds of As Lamas and A Compañía.

In 1934 the team achieved promotion to Serie A after finishing the season in first place. However, after this the Galician Football Federation sanctioned them for starting a player whose registration wasn't compliant with the rules during a match against Ferrol FC, meaning that in the end it was Ferrol that took the Serie B title. In the 1934-35 season they participated in the Galician Championship for the first time, in which they finished in second place with 13 points and a record of six wins, a draw and three losses, only behind Unión Sporting Club of Lavadores, the team that beat Lemos 2-0 on the final day of the season.

In the following season, however, Lemos claimed the title after overcoming Club Coruña 5-2 in a decisive match. They finished the league in this fashion with 14 points, one more than the Corunnans, and a record of six wins, two draws and two losses. Due to this, Lemos qualified to play in the first round of the Copa de España that year against Deportivo de La Coruña, the aforementioned Unión Sporting Club and Real Stadium Club Avilesino (the latter of which was disqualified), where they finished second in their group and, therefore, didn't manage to qualify for the second round.

== Honours ==
- Galician Championship

Winners (1): 1935–36

== Season to season ==
Season	Tier	Division	Place	Copa del Rey
1928–29	5	Serie B		
1929–30	5	Serie B	5th	
1930–31	5	Serie B	3rd	
1931–32	5	Serie B	1st	
1932–33	5	Serie B	2nd	
1933–34	5	Serie B	1st	
1934–35	3	Serie A	2nd	
1935–36	3	Serie A	1st	First round
1936–1942	DNP			
1942–43	3	Serie A	2nd	
1943–44	3	3ª	9th	First round
1944–45	3	3ª	8th	
1945–46	3	3ª	9th	
1946–47	3	3ª	6th	
1947–48	3	3ª	12th	Third round
1948–49	4	Serie A	1st	
1949–50	3	3ª	13th	
1950–51	3	3ª	14th	
1951–52	3	3ª	7th	
1952–53	3	3ª	11th	

Season	Tier	Division	Place	Copa del Rey
1953–54	3	3ª	16th	
1954–55	3	3ª	5th	
1955–56	3	3ª	5th	
1956–57	3	3ª	5th	
1957–58	3	3ª	15th	
1958–59	4	Serie A	1st	
1959–60	3	3ª	14th	
1960–61	3	3ª	4th	
1961–62	3	3ª	4th	
1962–63	3	3ª	9th	
1963–64	3	3ª	13th	
1964–65	3	3ª	11th	
1965–66	3	3ª	10th	
1966–67	3	3ª	11th	
1967–68	3	3ª	9th	
1968–69	3	3ª	19th	
1969–70	4	Serie A	1st	
1970–71	3	3ª	16th	
1971–72	3	3ª	15th	
1972–73	3	3ª	12th	

Season	Tier	Division	Place	Copa del Rey
1973–74	3	3ª	9th	First round
1974–75	3	3ª	15th	First round
1975–76	3	3ª	20th	First round
1976–77	4	Serie A	12th	
1977–78	5	Serie A	7th	
1978–79	5	Reg. Pref.	15th	
1979–80	5	Reg. Pref.	2nd	
1980–81	4	3ª	14th	
1981–82	4	3ª	15th	
1982–83	4	3ª	6th	
1983–84	4	3ª	13th	First round
1984–85	4	3ª	19th	
1985–86	4	3ª	17th	
1986–87	5	Reg. Pref.	1st	
1987–88	4	3ª	3rd	
1988–89	4	3ª	6th	
1989–90	4	3ª	14th	
1990–91	4	3ª	14th	
1991–92	4	3ª	20th	
1992–93	5	Reg. Pref.	12th	

Season	Tier	Division	Place	Copa del Rey
1993–94	5	Reg. Pref.	7th	
1994–95	5	Reg. Pref.	7th	
1995–96	5	Reg. Pref.	2nd	
1996–97	4	3ª	10th	
1997–98	4	3ª	8th	
1998–99	4	3ª	12th	
1999–2000	4	3ª	14th	
2000–01	4	3ª	8th	
2001–02	4	3ª	4th	
2002–03	4	3ª	20th	
2003–04	5	Reg. Pref.	4th	
2004–05	5	Reg. Pref.	2nd	
2005–06	4	3ª	17th	
2006–07	4	3ª	17th	
2007–08	4	3ª	20th	
2008–09	5	Pref. Aut.	15th	
2009–10	5	Pref. Aut.	14th	
2010–11	5	Pref. Aut.	16th	
2011–12	6	1ª Aut.	1st	
2012–13	5	Pref. Aut.	15th	

Season	Tier	Division	Place	Copa del Rey
2013–14	5	Pref. Aut.	18th	
2014–15	6	1ª Aut.	1st	
2015–16	5	Pref.	10th	
2016–17	5	Pref.	15th	
2017–18	6	1ª Gal.	3rd	
2018–19	6	1ª Gal.	1st	
2019–20	5	Pref.	15th	
2020–21	5	Pref.	2nd	
2021–22	6	Pref.	4th	
2022–23	6	Pref.	14th	
2023–24	6	Pref.	11th	
2024–25	6	Pref. Futgal	12th	
2025–26	6	Pref. Futgal		

- 51 seasons in Tercera División

== Notable former players ==
- (Albania) Albert Stroni
