= Vilassar de Dalt =

- Municipality
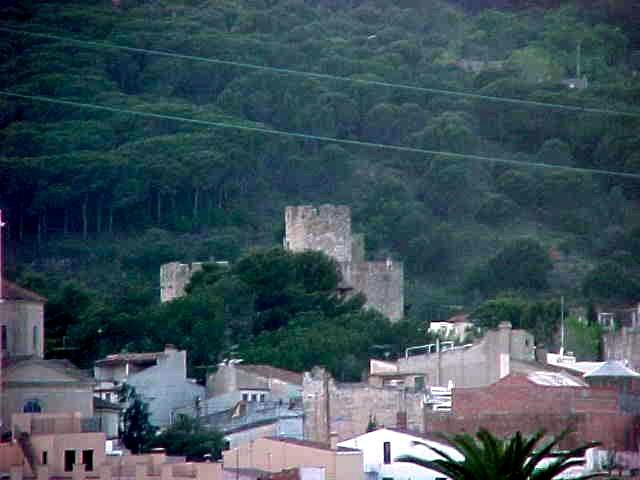
- Castle of Vilassar

- Coat of arms

- Location in Catalonia Vilassar de Dalt (Spain)
- Coordinates: 41°31′8″N 2°21′38″E
- Country: Spain
- Community: Catalonia
- Province: Barcelona
- Comarca: Maresme

Government
  - Mayor: Xavier Godàs Pérez (2015)

Area
  - Total: 8.9 km^{2} (3.4 sq mi)
- Elevation: 135 m (443 ft)

Population (2025-01-01)
  - Total: 9,404
  - Density: 1,100/km^{2} (2,700/sq mi)
- Demonym(s): Vilassarenc, vilassarenca
- Website: vilassardedalt.cat

Vilassar de Dalt (Catalan pronunciation: [biləˈsa ðə ˈðal]) is a village in Catalonia, Spain, in the province of Barcelona and the comarca of Maresme. The name comes from the Roman name Villa Azari, later changed to Vilassar. In the 20th century, it split into two villages: Vilassar in the hills (de Dalt), and Vilassar by the Sea (de Mar).

== Demography ==
1900	1930	1950	1970	1986	2007
3113	3374	3306	5736	6246	8476

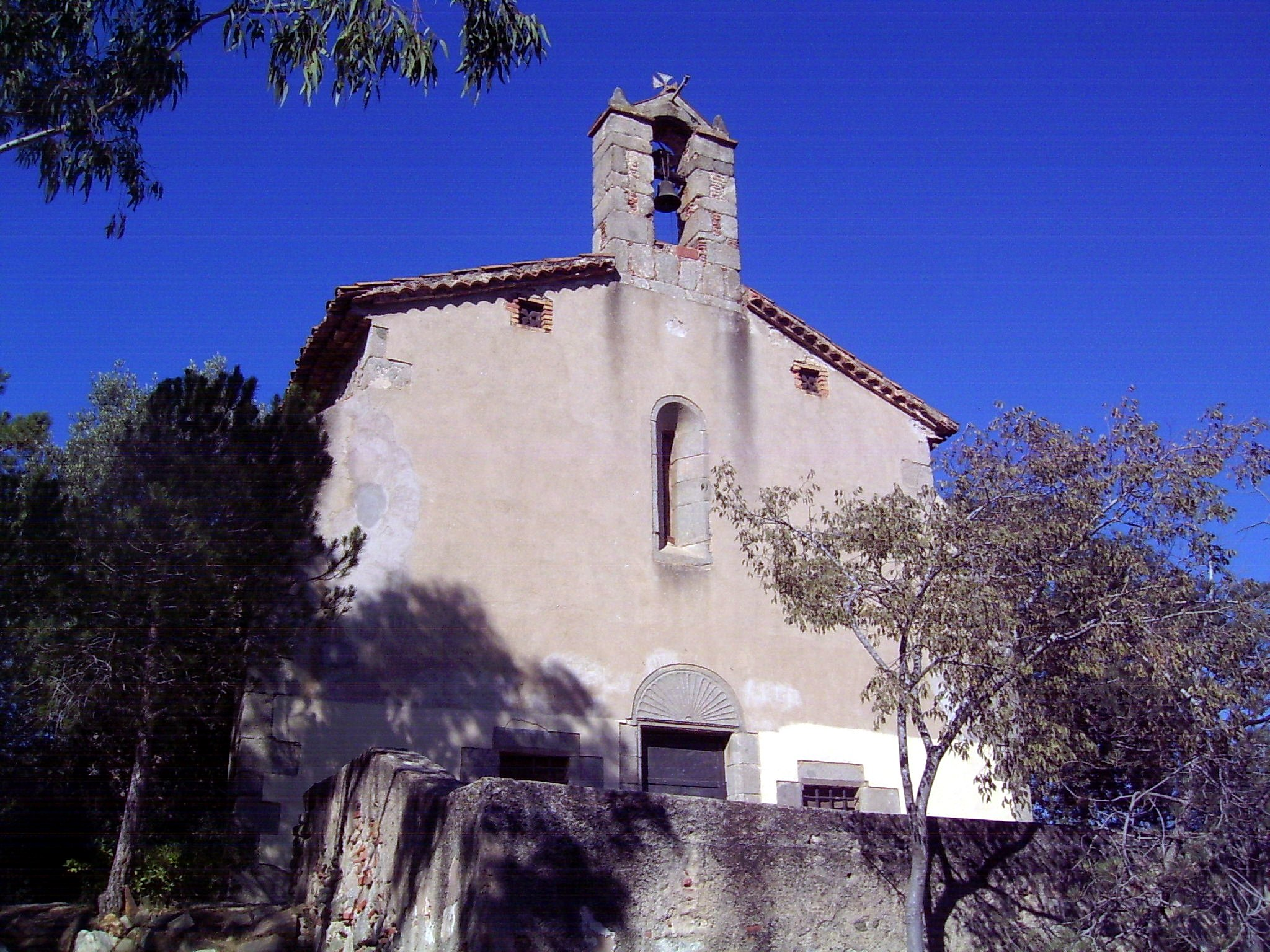
Ermitage of Sant Sebastià at Vilassar de Dalt, at the comarca del Maresme

== See also ==
- Cau del Cargol, private shell museum with over 16.000 different species.
- Vilassar de Dalt Archive-Museum, local history museum and archives
- Archive of the Marquises of Santa Maria de Barberà, medieval castle and archives of Catalan records dating back to the 10th century
