= Quarta Catalana =

Spanish association football league

- Founded: 2011
- Country: Spain
- Confederation: FCF
- Number of clubs: Variable (36 groups) (Season 2026-27)
- Level on pyramid: 10
- Promotion to: Tercera Catalana
- Relegation to: none
- Website: Official website
- Current: 2026–27 Quarta Catalana

The Quarta Catalana is the 10th and last tier of the Spanish football league system and the fifth highest league in the autonomous community of Catalonia. The league was formed in 2011 to replace the Tercera Territorial as third level of Catalonia and for the 2026–27 season was split into 36 groups. Every season, depending on budgets, each group can have from 10 to 16 teams.

== Structure ==
Territorially, groups are divided as following:

- Group 1 to 6 - Province of Girona
- Group 7 to 28 - Province of Barcelona
- Group 29 to 31 - Province of Lleida
- Group 32 to 34 - Province of Tarragona (not including Terres de l'Ebre)
- Group 35 and 36 - Terres de l'Ebre

== Groups (2021–22) ==
Group	Clubs
1	14
2	15
3	14
4	14
5	16
6	15
7	15
8	16
9	16
10	16
11	16
12	12
13	16
14	16
15	16
16	16
17	16
18	↑
19	↓
20	18
21	17
22	↑
23	12
24	12
25	↑
26	↓
27	18
28	16
29	17
30	17
31	↑

== See also ==
- Lliga Elit
- Primera Catalana
- Segona Catalana
- Tercera Catalana
- Divisiones Regionales de Fútbol
