= Tercera Catalana =

Spanish association football league

- Founded: 2011
- Country: Spain
- Confederation: FCF
- Number of clubs: 306 (17 groups)
- Level on pyramid: 9
- Promotion to: Segona Catalana
- Relegation to: Quarta Catalana
- Website: Official website

The Tercera Catalana is the 9th tier of the Spanish football league system and the fourth highest league in the autonomous community of Catalonia. The league was formed in 2011 to replace the Segona Territorial as third level of Catalonia and was split into 17 groups.

== Structure ==
Territorially, groups are divided as following:

- Group 1 - Terres de l'Ebre
- Group 2 and 3 - Rest of the Province of Tarragona
- Group 4, 5, 6, 7, 8, 9, 10, 11 and 12 - Province of Barcelona
- Group 13 and 14 - Province of Lleida
- Group 15, 16 and 17 - Province of Girona

== See also ==
- Primera Catalana
- Segona Catalana
- Divisiones Regionales de Fútbol
