= 1980–81 Segunda División B =

Season of third division football in Spain

The 1980–81 Segunda División B was the 4th season of Segunda División B, the third highest level of the Spanish football league system, since its establishment in 1977. First and 2nd in each group were promoted to Segunda División, and the bottom three were relegated to the Tercera División.

The division consisted of two geographic groups. Celta de Vigo were the Group I champions and RCD Mallorca were the Group II champions.

== Group 1 ==
Segunda División B (group 1)
- Season: 1980–81
- Champions: Celta de Vigo
- Promoted: Celta de Vigo; Deportivo de La Coruña
- Relegated: Pontevedra CF; UP Langreo; Gimnástica Arandina
- Matches: 380
- Goals: 922 (2.43 per match)
- Biggest home win: Bilbao A. 7–0 R. Ferrol (22 March 1981)
- Biggest away win: Mirandés 0–4 Huesca (12 April 1981)
- Highest scoring: Alcalá 4–5 Las Palmas A. (3 May 1981)

A total of 20 teams will contest the group, including 2 relegated from the Segunda División and 4 promoted from the Tercera División.

=== Promotion and relegation ===
Teams relegated from 1979–80 Segunda División

- Celta de Vigo
- Deportivo de La Coruña

Teams promoted from 1979–80 Tercera División

- SD Compostela
- San Sebastián CF
- RSD Alcalá
- Gimnástica Arandina

=== Teams ===
Teams from Aragon, Asturias, Basque Country, Canary Islands, Castile and León, Galicia, La Rioja and Madrid.

Locations of the Segunda División B 1980–81 teams (group 1)
Locations of the Segunda División B 1980–81 Canary Islands teams

Team	Founded	Home city	Stadium
Alcalá	1923	Alcalá de Henares, Madrid	El Val
Bilbao Athletic	1964	Bilbao, Basque Country	Lezama
Celta de Vigo	1923	Vigo, Galicia	Balaídos
Compostela	1962	Compostela, Galicia	Santa Isabel
Cultural Leonesa	1923	León, Castile and León	Antonio Amilivia
Deportivo de La Coruña	1906	A Coruña, Galicia	Riazor
Ensidesa	1956	Avilés, Asturias	Muro de Zaro
Gimnástica Arandina	1948	Aranda de Duero, Castile and León	El Montecillo
Huesca	1960	Huesca, Aragon	El Alcoraz
Langreo	1961	Langreo, Asturias	Ganzábal
Las Palmas Atlético	1977	Las Palmas, Canary Islands	Insular
Logroñés	1940	Logroño, La Rioja	Las Gaunas
Mirandés	1927	Miranda de Ebro, Castile and León	Anduva
Pontevedra	1941	Pontevedra, Galicia	Pasarón
Racing de Ferrol	1919	Ferrol, Galicia	Manuel Rivera
San Sebastián	1951	San Sebastián, Basque Country	Atotxa
Sestao	1916	Sestao, Basque Country	Las Llanas
Tenerife	1912	Tenerife, Canary Islands	Heliodoro Rodríguez López
Torrejón	1953	Torrejón de Ardoz, Madrid	Las Veredillas
Zamora	1968	Zamora, Castile and León	Ramiro Ledesma

=== League table ===
Pos	Team	Pld	W	D	L	GF	GA	GD	Pts	Promotion or relegation
1	Celta de Vigo (C, P)	38	23	12	3	76	22	+54	58	Promotion to Segunda División
2	Deportivo La Coruña (P)	38	25	6	7	70	36	+34	56	Promotion to Segunda División
3	Bilbao Athletic	38	17	11	10	53	31	+22	45	
4	Cultural Leonesa	38	18	9	11	57	41	+16	45	
5	Tenerife	38	17	11	10	47	40	+7	45	
6	CD Logroñés	38	17	9	12	57	48	+9	43	
7	Compostela	38	16	10	12	37	34	+3	42	
8	San Sebastián	38	15	11	12	43	34	+9	41	
9	Mirandés	38	16	7	15	41	42	−1	39	
10	Sestao Sport	38	13	12	13	39	42	−3	38	
11	Racing Ferrol	38	16	6	16	41	40	+1	38	
12	Las Palmas Atlético	38	15	7	16	51	51	0	37	
13	Torrejón	38	15	6	17	49	54	−5	36	
14	Alcalá	38	12	10	16	41	42	−1	34	
15	Ensidesa	38	12	8	18	45	66	−21	32	
16	Zamora	38	9	13	16	33	41	−8	31	
17	Huesca	38	10	11	17	45	56	−11	31	
18	Pontevedra (R)	38	9	8	21	26	57	−31	26	Relegation to Tercera División
19	Langreo (R)	38	6	11	21	41	77	−36	23	Relegation to Tercera División
20	Gimnástica Arandina (R)	38	4	12	22	30	68	−38	20	Relegation to Tercera División

Source: arquero-arba
Rules for classification: 1st points; 2nd head-to-head points; 3rd head-to-head goal difference; 4th head-to-head goals scored; 5th goal difference; 6th number of goals scored
(C) Champions; (P) Promoted; (R) Relegated

=== Results ===
Home \ Away	CEL	DCO	BAT	CLE	TEN	LOG	COM	SSE	MIR	SES	RFE	LPA	TOR	ALC	ENS	ZAM	SDH	PON	LAN	GAR
Celta de Vigo		1–0	2–0	6–1	5–1	5–0	4–1	3–0	0–0	4–1	1–0	3–0	4–0	1–0	1–0	1–0	3–0	5–0	5–1	1–0
Deportivo La Coruña	1–1		1–0	1–1	1–0	2–1	1–0	3–0	3–0	2–0	0–2	2–1	4–2	2–1	3–0	2–0	2–0	5–1	1–0	5–2
Bilbao Athletic	1–1	1–0		0–0	3–0	0–0	3–1	1–0	4–1	1–1	7–0	2–0	0–1	0–1	3–0	3–1	3–0	3–0	4–1	1–0
Cultural Leonesa	2–0	1–0	2–1		0–1	4–1	0–0	2–0	0–1	3–0	1–0	1–2	1–1	2–1	4–0	1–1	2–2	2–0	6–0	2–0
CD Tenerife	1–1	4–1	1–1	1–1		2–0	0–0	1–0	2–0	1–1	2–0	1–0	1–1	1–0	3–0	1–0	2–1	1–0	4–3	4–0
CD Logroñés	3–3	0–1	1–1	3–1	3–1		2–1	1–1	2–0	2–0	1–0	2–3	3–0	3–2	3–0	2–2	1–1	2–1	3–2	1–0
SD Compostela	0–1	2–2	3–0	2–1	3–0	0–2		1–0	1–0	1–0	1–0	2–0	1–0	2–0	1–0	1–0	0–0	1–0	2–1	1–0
San Sebastián CF	0–0	1–1	0–0	2–0	1–0	1–1	1–1		1–0	1–0	2–1	3–0	0–1	3–0	2–0	2–0	3–1	5–0	3–0	1–1
CD Mirandés	2–1	2–1	0–1	2–1	2–1	0–1	1–0	0–1		3–3	1–0	3–1	1–0	0–0	3–0	0–1	0–4	3–0	4–1	2–1
Sestao Sport	1–1	2–2	0–1	1–0	0–0	1–0	2–0	1–0	2–0		1–0	1–1	2–0	1–1	3–0	1–0	1–1	0–1	1–0	3–1
Racing Ferrol	0–2	1–2	1–1	1–2	2–0	2–1	1–0	1–0	0–0	0–0		1–0	2–0	1–0	2–2	3–0	3–0	1–0	4–0	1–0
Las Palmas Atlético	0–1	0–1	2–0	1–1	0–0	2–2	2–0	3–0	1–2	0–0	1–0		1–4	2–1	5–0	2–2	1–0	1–0	1–0	4–1
AD Torrejón	1–1	1–3	1–2	2–3	3–1	2–0	2–1	0–0	0–1	2–1	2–0	2–0		3–1	3–4	2–0	0–1	1–0	1–3	3–1
RSD Alcalá	1–0	1–2	2–0	0–1	2–1	1–0	1–1	4–1	1–0	0–1	0–1	4–5	0–0		0–2	0–0	0–0	1–0	2–2	6–0
CD Ensidesa	1–2	2–2	3–1	1–0	0–0	0–2	2–2	1–3	1–0	3–1	3–1	3–0	2–2	1–2		1–1	3–0	3–1	2–4	1–0
Zamora	0–0	0–2	0–0	4–0	1–2	1–0	0–1	1–1	2–2	1–0	1–1	0–0	3–0	0–1	1–3		2–0	2–0	0–0	0–0
SD Huesca	1–1	0–2	2–1	2–4	2–2	1–2	3–1	0–1	0–0	3–0	1–2	3–1	3–2	1–2	1–1	0–1		3–1	2–2	2–1
Pontevedra	0–0	2–0	1–1	0–1	0–1	1–1	1–1	1–1	2–1	2–5	2–0	1–0	1–0	1–1	3–0	1–0	0–2		1–0	0–0
UP Langreo	1–4	3–4	0–1	0–0	2–2	2–1	1–1	2–2	0–2	1–1	0–3	2–5	0–1	0–0	1–0	3–2	1–1	2–0		0–0
Gimnástica Arandina	1–1	0–3	1–1	1–3	0–1	1–4	0–0	1–0	2–2	3–0	3–3	0–3	2–3	1–1	0–0	2–3	2–1	1–1	1–0	

Source: arquero-arba
Legend: Blue = home team win; Yellow = draw; Red = away team win.

=== Top goalscorers ===
Goalscorers	Goals	Team
(Spain) Chalo	19	CD Tenerife
(Spain) José Manuel Traba	17	Deportivo de La Coruña
(Spain) Andrés Fernández	16	Celta de Vigo
(Spain) Primi	15	Cultural Leonesa
(Spain) Miguel Ángel Lotina	15	CD Logroñés

=== Top goalkeepers ===
Goalkeeper	Goals	Matches	Average	Team
(Spain) Joan Capó	17	33	0.52	Celta de Vigo
(Spain) Vicente Biurrun	23	30	0.77	San Sebastián CF
(Spain) Ignacio Mallo	25	30	0.83	SD Compostela
(Spain) Jorge García Santos	31	33	0.94	Deportivo de La Coruña
(Spain) Jesús González	31	31	1.00	Cultural Leonesa

== Group 2 ==
Segunda División B (group 2)
- Season: 1980–81
- Champions: RCD Mallorca
- Promoted: RCD Mallorca; Córdoba CF
- Relegated: Mérida; CD Diter Zafra; CD Eldense
- Matches: 380
- Goals: 850 (2.24 per match)
- Biggest home win: Terrassa 5–0 Ibiza (16 November 1980); Ibiza 5–0 Diter Zafra (14 December 1980); Mallorca 5–0 Córdoba (28 December 1980)
- Biggest away win: Cartagena 0–3 Algeciras (14 December 1980); Diter Zafra 1–4 Portuense (1 February 1981)
- Highest scoring: Jaén 6–3 Vall de Uxó (11 January 1981)

A total of 20 teams will contest the group, including 2 relegated from the Segunda División and 4 promoted from the Tercera División.

=== Promotion and relegation ===
Teams relegated from 1979–80 Segunda División

- Algeciras CF
- Gimnástico de Tarragona

Teams promoted from 1979–80 Tercera División

- RCD Mallorca
- Cartagena FC
- FC Andorra
- Mérida

=== Teams ===
Teams from Andalusia, Andorra, Balearic Islands, Castilla–La Mancha, Catalonia, Extremadura, Region of Murcia and Valencian Community.

Locations of the Segunda División B 1980–81 teams (group 2)

Team	Founded	Home city	Stadium
Algeciras	1909	Algeciras, Andalusia	El Mirador
FC Andorra	1942	Andorra la Vella, Andorra	Camp d'Esports de les Valls
Badajoz	1905	Badajoz, Extremadura	Vivero
Barcelona Atlético	1970	Barcelona, Catalonia	Fabra i Coats
Calvo Sotelo	1948	Puertollano, Castilla–La Mancha	Calvo Sotelo
Cartagena	1940	Cartagena, Region of Murcia	El Almarjal
Córdoba	1954	Córdoba, Andalusia	El Árcangel
Díter Zafra	1930	Zafra, Extremadura	Nuevo Estadio de Zafra
Eldense	1921	Elda, Valencian Community	Pepico Amat
Gimnástico de Tarragona	1886	Tarragona, Catalonia	Nou Estadi
Ibiza	1956	Ibiza, Balearic Islands	Carrer Canàries
Real Jaén	1929	Jaén, Andalusia	La Victoria
Lleida	1939	Lleida, Catalonia	Camp d'Esports
Mallorca	1916	Palma de Mallorca, Balearic Islands	Lluís Sitjar
Mérida	1912	Mérida, Extremadura	Romano
Portuense	1928	El Puerto de Santa María, Andalusia	José del Cuvillo
San Fernando	1940	San Fernando, Andalusia	Marqués de Varela
Terrassa	1906	Terrassa, Catalonia	Olímpic de Terrassa
Vall de Uxó	1975	La Vall d'Uixó, Valencian Community	José Mangriñán
Xerez	1947	Jerez de la Frontera, Andalusia	Domecq

=== League table ===
Pos	Team	Pld	W	D	L	GF	GA	GD	Pts	Promotion or relegation
1	RCD Mallorca (C, P)	38	21	12	5	62	33	+29	54	Promotion to Segunda División
2	Córdoba CF (P)	38	22	9	7	62	33	+29	53	Promotion to Segunda División
3	Barcelona Atlético	38	19	7	12	47	39	+8	45	
4	Algeciras	38	13	18	7	38	26	+12	44	
5	Cartagena FC	38	18	8	12	47	36	+11	44	
6	CD Badajoz	38	16	11	11	38	28	+10	43	
7	Real Jaén	38	15	11	12	51	43	+8	41	
8	Xerez CD	38	15	10	13	52	48	+4	40	
9	Gimnástico de Tarragona	38	11	17	10	37	35	+2	39	
10	UE Lleida	38	16	7	15	43	43	0	39	
11	FC Andorra	38	16	6	16	50	47	+3	38	
12	Racing Portuense	38	13	12	13	40	36	+4	38	
13	CF Calvo Sotelo	38	13	11	14	51	47	+4	37	
14	SD Ibiza	38	11	12	15	28	37	−9	34	
15	Terrassa	38	12	8	18	33	46	−13	32	
16	UD Vall de Uxó	38	12	8	18	41	62	−21	32	
17	CD San Fernando	38	10	11	17	36	44	−8	31	
18	Mérida (R)	38	10	9	19	35	52	−17	29	Relegation to Tercera División
19	CD Diter Zafra (R)	38	7	10	21	27	54	−27	24	Relegation to Tercera División
20	CD Eldense (R)	38	7	9	22	32	61	−29	23	Relegation to Tercera División

Source: arquero-arba
Rules for classification: 1st points; 2nd head-to-head points; 3rd head-to-head goal difference; 4th head-to-head goals scored; 5th goal difference; 6th number of goals scored
(C) Champions; (P) Promoted; (R) Relegated

=== Results ===
Home \ Away	MAL	COR	BAR	ALG	CAR	BAD	RJN	XER	GTA	LLE	AND	RPO	CSO	IBI	TER	VUX	SFE	MÉR	DZA	ELD
RCD Mallorca		5–0	3–0	1–0	1–1	4–0	1–0	3–2	1–1	3–1	2–1	1–1	1–0	3–1	2–0	1–1	1–0	2–2	1–1	4–1
Córdoba CF	4–1		3–0	1–1	4–1	0–0	2–0	2–0	2–0	3–0	3–0	3–1	3–1	2–0	2–0	4–2	2–1	1–0	1–0	2–1
Barcelona Atlético	1–3	1–0		0–0	3–1	2–0	1–0	4–0	2–0	2–1	1–3	2–0	2–0	0–0	2–0	1–0	1–0	2–0	0–1	3–0
Algeciras	0–0	1–0	0–0		2–0	1–1	1–1	2–2	1–1	0–1	1–0	0–0	1–1	3–1	2–2	3–0	2–0	1–0	1–0	2–0
Cartagena FC	2–0	0–0	2–0	0–3		1–0	3–0	3–1	0–0	1–0	4–1	1–0	2–2	1–0	3–0	0–0	1–1	3–0	3–0	1–0
CD Badajoz	1–0	3–0	1–1	2–0	2–0		0–0	2–1	4–0	0–1	1–0	2–0	1–1	1–0	1–0	3–0	2–1	1–1	3–0	1–0
Real Jaén	0–0	0–0	3–0	1–1	2–0	1–1		2–0	1–0	2–3	1–0	3–1	1–2	2–1	2–0	6–3	3–0	1–1	1–0	3–1
Xerez CD	3–2	0–2	2–2	0–1	4–3	2–1	1–0		1–1	2–0	3–1	0–0	5–1	1–0	1–2	3–0	1–2	2–0	1–3	4–1
Gimnástico de Tarragona	2–2	1–2	1–2	0–1	1–0	0–0	1–1	2–1		1–0	1–1	1–1	1–0	1–1	0–0	5–1	1–0	3–0	2–0	2–0
UE Lleida	3–2	2–1	3–0	1–1	0–1	0–0	1–0	0–1	1–1		3–1	2–0	1–2	1–1	1–0	2–1	4–0	2–4	2–1	2–1
FC Andorra	0–1	2–2	1–0	1–0	0–0	2–1	2–0	1–1	1–0	1–0		2–0	1–2	4–0	1–1	2–0	2–0	1–0	2–1	5–1
Racing Portuense	1–2	1–0	1–1	0–0	3–0	0–0	3–1	0–2	0–0	2–0	2–1		1–0	2–0	0–0	3–2	1–0	2–0	4–0	3–0
CF Calvo Sotelo	2–2	1–2	1–2	1–0	0–2	3–0	3–1	0–1	1–2	1–1	5–2	1–1		2–0	2–0	1–1	4–1	2–1	3–0	2–2
SD Ibiza	0–0	1–1	1–0	0–0	2–1	1–0	0–0	0–0	0–0	3–0	1–0	1–1	0–0		2–1	1–0	0–1	2–0	5–0	1–0
Terrassa	0–1	2–1	1–2	1–0	0–2	0–0	2–2	0–0	2–3	0–2	1–0	3–1	1–0	5–0		1–0	1–2	3–2	0–2	1–0
UD Vall de Uxó	0–0	1–3	2–3	3–1	3–2	1–0	1–2	0–0	1–0	1–0	2–1	1–0	2–1	2–1	1–0		0–0	3–1	1–1	2–0
CD San Fernando	0–1	1–1	1–1	1–1	1–0	0–2	2–3	2–2	2–0	0–0	2–2	1–0	0–1	1–0	4–0	0–0		3–0	1–2	4–0
Mérida	0–1	2–2	1–0	1–2	0–1	1–0	1–1	2–0	1–1	1–1	1–2	2–0	2–1	1–0	0–0	3–0	1–1		2–1	1–0
CD Diter Zafra	1–2	0–0	2–1	0–0	0–1	0–1	2–3	0–1	0–0	0–1	1–2	1–4	0–0	0–0	0–1	3–2	0–0	2–0		1–1
CD Eldense	0–2	0–1	1–2	2–2	0–0	3–0	2–1	1–1	1–1	2–0	2–1	0–0	1–1	0–1	0–2	4–1	1–0	2–0	1–1	

Source: arquero-arba
Legend: Blue = home team win; Yellow = draw; Red = away team win.

=== Top goalscorers ===
Goalscorers	Goals	Team
(Spain) Luis Alonso	21	UE Lleida
(Spain) Miguel Gregori	20	Cartagena FC
(Spain) Francesc Valverde	18	FC Andorra
(Spain) Paco Bonet	16	RCD Mallorca
(Spain) Manolín Cuesta	16	Córdoba CF

=== Top goalkeepers ===
Goalkeeper	Goals	Matches	Average	Team
(Spain) Vicente Gómez	23	34	0.68	Algeciras
(Spain) Alejandro Valero	28	38	0.74	CD Badajoz
(Spain) Nemesio Alonso	26	31	0.84	CD San Fernando
(Spain) Francisco Luna	33	38	0.87	Córdoba CF
(Spain) Joaquim Ferrer	28	38	0.88	RCD Mallorca
