= 1979–80 Segunda División B =

Season of third division football in Spain

The 1979–80 Segunda División B was the 3rd season of Segunda División B, the third highest level of the Spanish football league system, since its establishment in 1977. First and 2nd in each group were promoted to Segunda División, and the bottom four were relegated to the Tercera División.

The division consisted of two geographic groups. Barakaldo CF were the Group I champions and Linares CF were the Group II champions.

== Group 1 ==
Segunda División B (group 1)
- Season: 1979–80
- Champions: Baracaldo CF
- Promoted: Baracaldo CF; Atlético Madrileño
- Relegated: Sporting Atlético; Arenas de Guecho; CD Orense; CD Guecho
- Matches: 380
- Goals: 915 (2.41 per match)
- Biggest home win: A. Madrileño 8-1 Orense (30 September 1979)
- Biggest away win: Ferrol 1–4 Langreo (2 September 1979); Guecho 1–4 Tenerife (18 November 1979); Arenas 1–4 Tenerife (20 April 1980); Guecho 0–3 Bilbao A. (9 September 1979); Arenas 0–3 Baracaldo (2 December 1979)
- Highest scoring: A. Madrileño 8-1 Orense (30 September 1979)

A total of 20 teams will contest the group, including 2 relegated from the Segunda División and 4 promoted from the Tercera División.

=== Promotion and relegation ===
Teams relegated from 1978–79 Segunda División

- Baracaldo CF
- Racing de Ferrol

Teams promoted from 1978–79 Tercera División

- Las Palmas Atlético
- Sporting Atlético
- Arenas de Guecho
- CD Guecho

=== Teams ===
Teams from Aragon, Asturias, Basque Provinces, Canary Islands, Galicia, León, New Castile and Old Castile.

Locations of the Segunda División B 1979–80 teams (group 1)
Locations of the Segunda División B 1979–80 Basque teams
Locations of the Segunda División B 1979–80 Canary teams

Team	Founded	Home city	Stadium
Arenas de Getxo	1909	Getxo, Basque Provinces	Gobela
Atlético Madrileño	1969	Madrid, New Castile	Vicente Calderón
Baracaldo	1917	Barakaldo, Basque Provinces	Lasesarre
Bilbao Athletic	1964	Bilbao, Basque Provinces	Lezama
Cultural Leonesa	1923	León, León	Antonio Amilivia
Ensidesa	1956	Avilés, Asturias	Muro de Zaro
Getxo	1927	Getxo, Basque Provinces	Fadura
Huesca	1960	Huesca, Aragon	El Alcoraz
Langreo	1961	Langreo, Asturias	Ganzábal
Las Palmas Atlético	1977	Las Palmas, Canary Islands	Insular
Logroñés	1940	Logroño, Old Castile	Las Gaunas
Mirandés	1927	Miranda de Ebro, Old Castile	Anduva
Orense	1952	Ourense, Galicia	O Couto
Pontevedra	1941	Pontevedra, Galicia	Pasarón
Racing de Ferrol	1919	Ferrol, Galicia	Manuel Rivera
Sestao	1916	Sestao, Basque Provinces	Las Llanas
Sporting Atlético	1960	Gijón, Asturias	Mareo
Tenerife	1912	Tenerife, Canary Islands	Heliodoro Rodríguez López
Torrejón	1953	Torrejón de Ardoz, New Castile	Las Veredillas
Zamora	1968	Zamora, León	Ramiro Ledesma

=== League table ===
Pos	Team	Pld	W	D	L	GF	GA	GD	Pts	Promotion or relegation
1	Baracaldo CF (C, P)	38	20	15	3	59	32	+27	55	Promotion to Segunda División
2	Atlético Madrileño (P)	38	21	12	5	75	32	+43	54	Promotion to Segunda División
3	CD Tenerife	38	20	9	9	56	31	+25	49	
4	Cultural Leonesa	38	18	11	9	52	31	+21	47	
5	UP Langreo	38	19	8	11	41	32	+9	46	
6	Zamora	38	19	5	14	52	47	+5	43	
7	Sestao Sport	38	14	14	10	38	32	+6	42	
8	AD Torrejón	38	15	11	12	57	44	+13	41	
9	Las Palmas Atlético	38	13	14	11	51	49	+2	40	
10	CD Logroñés	38	15	8	15	55	49	+6	38	
11	CD Mirandés	38	13	12	13	40	42	−2	38	
12	Bilbao Athletic	38	13	10	15	49	46	+3	36	
13	Pontevedra	38	11	11	16	42	51	−9	33	
14	SD Huesca	38	11	10	17	35	52	−17	32	
15	CD Ensidesa	38	11	9	18	34	46	−12	31	
16	Racing Ferrol	38	12	6	20	34	56	−22	30	
17	Sporting Atlético (R)	38	7	15	16	37	47	−10	29	Relegation to Tercera División
18	Arenas de Guecho (R)	38	10	8	20	34	52	−18	28	Relegation to Tercera División
19	CD Orense (R)	38	7	12	19	34	65	−31	26	Relegation to Tercera División
20	CD Getxo (R)	38	9	4	25	40	79	−39	22	Relegation to Tercera División

Source: arquero-arba
Rules for classification: 1st points; 2nd head-to-head points; 3rd head-to-head goal difference; 4th head-to-head goals scored; 5th goal difference; 6th number of goals scored
(C) Champions; (P) Promoted; (R) Relegated
- Sporting Atlético was called CD Gijón until last season.

=== Results ===
Home \ Away	BAR	MAD	TEN	CLE	LAN	ZAM	SES	TOR	LPA	LOG	MIR	BAT	PON	SDH	ENS	RFE	SPO	AGU	ORE	GUE
Baracaldo CF		1–1	3–2	2–2	2–1	3–0	1–0	0–0	1–1	1–1	1–0	1–0	5–0	1–1	1–0	4–1	3–1	2–0	1–0	4–2
Atlético Madrileño	1–1		1–1	1–0	1–1	6–1	1–1	3–1	3–0	1–2	1–1	1–1	2–1	3–1	5–0	2–0	0–0	4–1	8–1	5–1
CD Tenerife	1–1	2–0		0–0	1–0	2–0	3–2	1–1	1–0	2–1	5–1	0–1	1–0	4–0	2–1	1–0	3–0	1–0	2–0	4–1
Cultural Leonesa	2–1	2–3	0–0		1–1	1–0	1–1	1–1	1–0	2–0	3–0	3–0	1–0	4–0	1–0	2–0	1–0	3–2	4–1	1–1
UP Langreo	0–0	1–0	1–0	1–1		2–0	2–0	1–2	1–1	1–0	1–0	1–0	2–0	1–0	1–0	1–0	2–1	1–0	0–0	1–0
Zamora	2–1	1–0	1–0	1–0	3–2		0–2	1–0	2–1	3–0	2–0	5–1	1–1	2–0	1–0	4–1	1–0	2–0	2–0	1–0
Sestao Sport	1–1	0–1	1–0	0–0	2–0	1–1		2–3	1–1	2–0	2–0	1–0	2–0	2–0	2–0	0–0	0–0	0–0	2–0	2–1
AD Torrejón	1–1	0–2	2–1	4–3	2–0	2–1	4–1		0–1	2–1	1–2	1–0	0–0	1–2	3–1	6–0	4–1	2–1	4–1	3–1
Las Palmas Atlético	1–2	2–2	2–1	1–0	1–1	3–1	1–1	1–1		4–3	1–1	2–2	2–0	0–0	1–0	2–2	1–0	3–1	1–2	3–1
CD Logroñés	4–0	1–2	0–0	2–0	2–1	1–0	2–0	1–0	1–2		2–1	0–1	2–0	0–0	3–4	3–0	2–1	1–3	1–0	6–0
CD Mirandés	0–0	0–0	3–0	0–0	0–1	1–0	1–1	0–0	3–2	2–1		1–0	2–0	4–2	4–1	1–0	2–2	2–1	1–1	2–0
Bilbao Athletic	0–1	1–1	2–3	1–2	5–1	3–3	2–0	1–0	1–0	2–2	2–1		2–2	3–1	3–1	3–0	4–0	2–1	0–2	1–3
Pontevedra	2–2	2–0	0–1	2–1	3–0	1–1	1–0	1–0	1–2	1–1	1–2	1–0		2–2	1–0	2–0	1–1	1–2	2–2	2–1
SD Huesca	0–1	0–2	0–1	1–1	1–3	3–1	1–2	0–0	2–1	1–3	0–0	1–1	3–2		1–0	1–0	1–0	4–1	2–1	1–0
CD Ensidesa	0–0	2–2	0–0	1–0	0–2	4–2	0–0	2–1	4–1	4–0	0–0	0–0	0–1	1–0		1–0	1–2	2–0	1–0	0–0
Racing Ferrol	1–2	0–1	2–0	2–0	1–4	1–0	0–0	0–0	1–2	1–1	2–0	2–0	0–2	1–0	4–1		0–0	1–0	1–0	4–1
Sporting Atlético	1–2	1–3	0–0	1–3	0–0	0–0	0–0	3–0	1–1	2–2	1–0	0–0	3–3	0–1	0–0	5–0		1–0	4–1	0–1
Arenas de Guecho	0–3	0–1	1–4	0–2	1–0	1–0	2–0	1–1	0–0	0–0	1–0	1–0	2–2	1–1	2–0	3–1	0–2		1–1	4–1
CD Orense	1–1	0–2	2–2	0–2	1–0	2–3	1–2	3–3	1–1	1–2	0–0	1–1	1–0	1–1	0–0	1–3	2–1	1–0		1–0
CD Getxo	1–2	1–3	1–4	0–1	0–2	1–3	1–2	2–1	3–2	2–1	4–2	0–3	2–1	1–0	0–2	0–2	2–2	0–0	4–1	

Source: arquero-arba
Legend: Blue = home team win; Yellow = draw; Red = away team win.

=== Top goalscorers ===
Goalscorers	Goals	Team
(Spain) Marcelino Mateos	21	Zamora CF
(Spain) Santiago Martín Prado	16	Atlético Madrileño
(Spain) Víctor Alberto	16	CD Tenerife
(Spain) Alberto Biota	16	CD Getxo
(Spain) Luis Alonso	14	CD Orense

=== Top goalkeepers ===
Goalkeeper	Goals	Matches	Average	Team
(Spain) Jesús González	26	35	0.74	Cultural Leonesa
(Spain) Nacho Pérez	19	25	0.76	UP Langreo
(Spain) Ángel Jesús Mejías	31	38	0.82	Atlético Madrileño
(Spain) Manuel Hernández	30	36	0.83	CD Tenerife
(Spain) Juan Luis Meléndez	32	38	0.84	Baracaldo CF

== Group 2 ==
Segunda División B (group 2)
- Season: 1979–80
- Champions: Linares CF
- Promoted: Linares CF; AD Ceuta
- Relegated: UD San Andrés; Sevilla Atlético; Gerona CF; Onteniente CF
- Matches: 380
- Goals: 859 (2.26 per match)
- Biggest home win: Jaén 5–0 Badajoz (9 September 1979); Córdoba 5–0 Vall de Uxó (6 April 1980); San Fernando 5–0 Onteniente (20 April 1980); Lleida 5–0 Gerona (11 May 1980)
- Biggest away win: Onteniente 1–5 Calvo Sotelo (4 May 1980)
- Highest scoring: Ceuta 5–2 Xerez (9 September 1979); Xerez 2–5 Ceuta (3 February 1980); San Andrés 3–4 Terrassa (18 May 1980)

A total of 20 teams will contest the group, including 2 relegated from the Segunda División and 4 promoted from the Tercera División.

=== Promotion and relegation ===
Teams relegated from 1978–79 Segunda División

- Terrassa FC
- Real Jaén

Teams promoted from 1978–79 Tercera División

- CD San Fernando
- CD Eldense
- UD Vall de Uxó

=== Teams ===
Teams from Andalusia, Balearic Islands, Catalonia, Extremadura, New Castile and Valencia.

Locations of the Segunda División B 1979–80 teams (group 2)

Team	Founded	Home city	Stadium
Badajoz	1905	Badajoz, Extremadura	Vivero
Barcelona Atlético	1970	Barcelona, Catalonia	Fabra i Coats
Calvo Sotelo	1948	Puertollano, Castilla–La Mancha	Calvo Sotelo
Ceuta	1970	Ceuta	Alfonso Murube
Córdoba	1954	Córdoba, Andalusia	El Árcangel
Díter Zafra	1930	Zafra, Extremadura	Nuevo Estadio de Zafra
Eldense	1921	Elda, Valencia	Pepico Amat
Gerona	1930	Girona, Catalonia	Montilivi
Ibiza	1956	Ibiza, Balearic Islands	Carrer Canàries
Real Jaén	1929	Jaén, Andalusia	La Victoria
Linares	1961	Linares, Andalusia	Linarejos
Lleida	1939	Lleida, Catalonia	Camp d'Esports
Onteniente	1947	Ontinyent, Valencia	El Clariano
Portuense	1928	El Puerto de Santa María, Andalusia	José del Cuvillo
San Andrés	1909	Barcelona, Catalonia	Calle Santa Coloma
San Fernando	1940	San Fernando, Andalusia	Marqués de Varela
Sevilla Atlético	1950	Seville, Andalusia	Ciudad Deportiva José Ramón Cisneros Palacios
Terrassa	1906	Terrassa, Catalonia	Olímpic de Terrassa
Vall de Uxó	1975	La Vall d'Uixó, Valencia	José Mangriñán
Xerez	1947	Jerez de la Frontera, Andalusia	Domecq

=== League table ===
Pos	Team	Pld	W	D	L	GF	GA	GD	Pts	Promotion or relegation
1	Linares CF (C, P)	38	19	10	9	47	32	+15	48	Promotion to Segunda División
2	AD Ceuta (P)	38	18	11	9	61	44	+17	47	Promotion to Segunda División
3	Racing Portuense	38	16	14	8	42	35	+7	46	
4	CF Calvo Sotelo	38	19	7	12	55	34	+21	45	
5	Terrassa	38	14	16	8	44	38	+6	44	
6	UE Lleida	38	16	11	11	40	35	+5	43	
7	Córdoba CF	38	17	7	14	47	38	+9	41	
8	CD San Fernando	38	17	6	15	43	37	+6	40	
9	CD Eldense	38	15	9	14	49	47	+2	39	
10	CD Badajoz	38	13	13	12	45	50	−5	39	
11	UD Vall de Uxó	38	14	10	14	44	46	−2	38	
12	Real Jaén	38	12	13	13	41	34	+7	37	
13	Xerez CD	38	14	9	15	43	49	−6	37	
14	Barcelona Atlético	38	11	14	13	36	35	+1	36	
15	SD Ibiza	38	11	13	14	31	35	−4	35	
16	CD Diter Zafra	38	13	6	19	41	48	−7	32	
17	UD San Andrés (R)	38	10	12	16	39	45	−6	32	Relegation to Tercera División
18	Sevilla Atlético (R)	38	11	10	17	44	49	−5	32	Relegation to Tercera División
19	Gerona CF (R)	38	9	10	19	40	64	−24	28	Relegation to Tercera División
20	Onteniente CF (R)	38	7	7	24	27	64	−37	21	Relegation to Tercera División

Source: arquero-arba
Rules for classification: 1st points; 2nd head-to-head points; 3rd head-to-head goal difference; 4th head-to-head goals scored; 5th goal difference; 6th number of goals scored
(C) Champions; (P) Promoted; (R) Relegated
- Terrassa FC was called Tarrasa CF until last season.
- UD San Andrés was called CD San Andrés until last season.

=== Results ===
Home \ Away	LIN	CEU	RPO	CSO	TER	LLE	COR	SFE	ELD	BAD	VUX	RJN	XER	BAR	IBI	DZA	SAN	SAT	GER	ONT
Linares CF		5–1	2–2	1–1	1–0	1–1	1–0	1–1	0–1	0–0	1–0	1–0	1–0	2–0	0–2	1–0	0–0	4–0	2–1	1–0
AD Ceuta	3–1		2–0	2–0	2–0	2–0	0–0	2–0	3–2	4–1	3–2	2–0	5–2	3–3	1–1	3–1	0–0	3–1	1–0	4–0
Racing Portuense	2–1	3–0		1–0	1–1	2–0	0–0	0–0	1–0	2–2	1–1	2–0	2–0	0–0	2–1	3–0	1–0	2–1	2–2	2–1
CF Calvo Sotelo	2–4	2–0	3–0		3–0	0–1	1–2	1–0	2–0	3–0	2–1	2–1	1–2	0–1	3–1	2–0	3–0	0–0	1–1	1–0
Terrassa	0–0	1–1	1–1	0–1		0–0	1–1	2–0	1–1	1–1	1–1	1–1	2–0	2–0	1–1	3–1	1–0	2–1	1–1	3–0
UE Lleida	1–1	1–0	0–2	2–0	0–0		2–1	1–1	4–0	1–0	1–0	0–0	2–2	1–0	1–0	2–1	0–2	1–1	5–0	1–1
Córdoba CF	1–0	2–1	1–0	2–1	1–2	0–0		3–0	1–2	2–0	5–0	0–0	1–3	2–4	1–0	4–2	1–0	1–0	1–0	0–1
CD San Fernando	0–1	2–0	2–0	2–3	1–0	1–0	3–1		2–0	2–1	3–1	1–0	2–1	0–1	2–0	2–1	2–1	2–1	1–0	5–0
CD Eldense	3–0	4–2	0–0	1–0	1–2	0–1	1–0	1–0		2–0	2–2	2–2	2–0	3–0	2–0	2–1	2–2	0–1	4–1	3–0
CD Badajoz	0–2	1–1	3–1	1–2	3–1	1–0	2–2	0–0	2–1		1–0	2–2	2–0	1–1	1–1	2–1	2–1	1–0	3–0	3–0
UD Vall de Uxó	2–0	3–0	1–1	0–0	2–0	2–0	1–1	2–4	0–0	1–2		2–1	3–2	1–0	0–0	1–1	1–0	2–1	2–0	1–0
Real Jaén	1–2	0–0	1–1	0–0	0–0	0–2	2–0	0–0	3–1	5–0	2–1		3–0	2–0	0–0	1–0	1–2	0–0	4–0	2–0
Xerez CD	2–1	2–5	3–0	0–1	0–0	3–1	2–0	2–0	0–0	1–1	2–1	0–2		0–0	1–0	1–0	1–0	2–1	2–1	1–0
Barcelona Atlético	0–1	0–1	0–0	1–1	3–0	0–1	1–0	1–0	1–0	2–3	1–2	0–0	2–1		0–0	0–0	2–2	0–0	0–1	4–1
SD Ibiza	1–2	0–0	1–0	2–2	1–2	2–2	1–3	1–0	2–1	1–0	0–0	0–1	1–1	0–0		1–0	2–0	1–0	1–0	1–0
CD Diter Zafra	1–1	1–1	0–1	0–2	0–2	2–0	0–3	2–0	0–1	0–0	2–1	2–0	1–0	1–0	2–1		2–1	3–0	2–0	4–1
UD San Andrés	1–1	0–0	0–1	1–0	3–4	1–3	1–0	2–1	4–1	1–1	0–1	3–1	1–1	0–3	1–0	2–2		1–1	1–2	0–0
Sevilla Atlético	0–1	2–3	4–1	1–3	2–2	3–1	2–1	2–0	4–0	0–0	2–1	3–1	1–0	1–3	1–1	0–2	0–1		4–1	2–1
Gerona CF	0–2	0–0	1–1	2–1	1–2	3–0	0–1	1–1	2–2	3–2	3–0	1–2	2–2	1–1	1–0	2–1	1–4	1–1		1–2
Onteniente CF	2–1	1–0	0–1	1–5	1–2	0–1	1–2	1–0	1–1	3–0	1–2	1–0	1–1	1–1	1–3	1–2	0–0	0–0	2–3	

Source: arquero-arba
Legend: Blue = home team win; Yellow = draw; Red = away team win.

=== Top goalscorers ===
Goalscorers	Goals	Team
(Spain) Enrique García	17	Real Jaén
(Spain) Chicha	16	CD San Fernando
(Spain) Ignacio Sancho	16	UD Vall de Uxó
(Spain) Antonio Ballesteros	15	CD Eldense
(Spain) Fernando Aramburu	13	AgD Ceuta

=== Top goalkeepers ===
Goalkeeper	Goals	Matches	Average	Team
(Spain) José Manuel González	17	23	0.74	Córdoba CF
(Spain) Manuel Guerrero	30	38	0.79	Linares CF
(Spain) Joaquim Ferrer	26	32	0.81	Barcelona Atlético
(Spain) José Gabriel Simeón	19	22	0.86	RC Portuense
(Spain) José Palomo	26	30	0.87	UE Lleida
