= 1981–82 Segunda División B =

Season of third division football in Spain

Segunda División B
- Season: 1981–82
- Champions: Barcelona Atlético; Xerez CD
- Promoted: Barcelona Atlético; Xerez CD; Palencia CF; Cartagena FC
- Relegated: Zamora CF; CD Mirandés; CD Ensidesa; CD Tarrasa; UD Vall de Uxó; Las Palmas Atlético
- Matches: 760
- Goals: 1,683 (2.21 per match)
- Top goalscorer: Luis Alonso; Francesc Valverde (20 goals)
- Best goalkeeper: Vicente Gómez (0.59 goals/match)
- Biggest home win: Ceuta 8–1 Reus (16 May 1982); Racing de Ferrol 8–1 CD Mirandés (23 May 1982)
- Biggest away win: Las Palmas Atlético 0–5 Gimnástico de Tarragona (23 January 1982)
- Highest scoring: Ceuta 8–1 Reus (16 May 1982); Racing de Ferrol 8–1 CD Mirandés (23 May 1982)

The 1981–82 Segunda División B season was the 5th since its establishment. The first matches of the season were played on 20 September 1981, and the season ended on 23 May 1982.

The division consisted of two geographic groups. Barcelona Atlético (FC Barcelona's reserve team) were the Group I champions and Xerez CD were the Group II champions.

== Overview before the season ==
40 teams joined the league, including four relegated from the 1980–81 Segunda División and 6 promoted from the 1980–81 Tercera División. The composition of the groups was determined by the Royal Spanish Football Federation, attending to geographical criteria.

Relegated from Segunda División

- Granada CF
- Palencia CF
- Barakaldo CF
- AgD Ceuta

Promoted from Tercera División

- Endesa Andorra
- CD Antequerano
- Sporting Atlético
- CF Reus Deportivo
- Lorca Deportiva
- Club Erandio

== Group I ==
=== Teams ===
Teams from Aragon, Asturias, Basque Country, Canary Islands, Castile and León, Catalonia, Galicia, La Rioja and Madrid.

Location of teams in Segunda División B Gr. 1 1981–82
Canary Islands

Team	Founded	Home city	Stadium
Alcalá	1923	Alcalá de Henares, Madrid	El Val
Endesa Andorra	1957	Andorra, Aragon	Juan Antonio Endeiza
Barakaldo	1917	Barakaldo, Basque Country	Lasesarre
Barcelona Atlético	1970	Barcelona, Catalonia	Fabra i Coats
Bilbao Athletic	1964	Bilbao, Basque Country	Lezama
Compostela	1962	Compostela, Galicia	Santa Isabel
Cultural Leonesa	1923	León, Castile and León	Antonio Amilivia
Ensidesa	1956	Avilés, Asturias	Muro de Zaro
Erandio	1915	Erandio, Basque Country	Nuevo Ategorri
Huesca	1960	Huesca, Aragon	El Alcoraz
Lérida	1939	Lleida, Catalonia	Camp d'Esports
Logroñés	1940	Logroño, La Rioja	Las Gaunas
Mirandés	1927	Miranda de Ebro, Castile and León	Anduva
Palencia CF	1960	Palencia, Castile and León	La Balastera
Racing de Ferrol	1919	Ferrol, Galicia	Manuel Rivera
San Sebastián	1951	San Sebastián, Basque Country	Atotxa
Sestao	1916	Sestao, Basque Country	Las Llanas
Sporting Atlético	1960	Gijón, Asturias	Mareo
Tenerife	1912	Tenerife, Canary Islands	Heliodoro Rodríguez López
Zamora	1968	Zamora, Castile and León	Ramiro Ledesma

=== League table ===
Pos	Team	Pld	W	D	L	GF	GA	GD	Pts	Promotion or relegation
1	Barcelona Atl.	38	22	11	5	75	33	+42	55	Promoted to Segunda División
2	Palencia CF	38	20	12	6	50	24	+26	52	Promoted to Segunda División
3	Zamora CF	38	17	14	7	47	24	+23	48 (Note: Relegated for not paying debts)	Relegated to Tercera División
4	Sestao SC	38	15	14	9	44	33	+11	44	
5	CD Logroñés	38	15	13	10	51	51	0	43	
6	Barakaldo CF	38	14	13	11	44	42	+2	41	
7	Club Erandio	38	14	13	11	36	31	+5	41	
8	RSD Alcalá	38	14	12	12	55	42	+13	40	
9	CD Endesa Andorra	38	14	11	13	49	40	+9	39	
10	Bilbao Athletic	38	13	13	12	41	43	−2	39	
11	San Sebastián CF	38	14	8	16	45	45	0	36	
12	Sporting Gijón Atl.	38	13	10	15	43	44	−1	36	
13	CD Tenerife	38	14	7	17	42	39	+3	35	
14	UD Lérida	38	11	13	14	41	53	−12	35	
15	SD Compostela	38	13	8	17	31	42	−11	34	
16	SD Huesca	38	11	12	15	41	58	−17	34	
17	Racing Ferrol	38	11	11	16	36	43	−7	33	
18	CD Mirandés	38	10	9	19	39	60	−21	29	Relegated to Tercera División
19	Cultural Leonesa	38	9	11	18	42	57	−15	29 (Note: Took the place of Zamora CF)	
20	CD Ensidesa	38	3	11	24	27	75	−48	17	Relegated to Tercera División

Source: BDFútbol

=== Results ===
Home \ Away	ALC	AND	BAK	BAR	BIL	COM	CUL	ENS	ERA	HUE	LLE	LOG	MIR	PAL	RFE	SSE	SES	SPO	TEN	ZAM
Alcalá	—	4–1	1–2	1–1	1–1	3–1	4–1	4–0	3–0	3–0	0–0	2–3	3–0	0–0	2–0	1–0	2–1	2–0	1–1	0–1
Endesa Andorra	2–0	—	0–1	2–0	2–0	5–0	0–1	4–2	2–0	2–0	3–0	2–2	4–1	0–0	0–0	2–1	1–1	2–1	1–1	0–1
Barakaldo	1–1	1–1	—	0–2	2–3	4–1	3–1	0–0	0–0	2–2	2–0	4–1	2–1	1–1	2–1	1–1	1–1	2–1	2–1	1–0
Barcelona Atlético	1–1	2–1	3–0	—	2–0	4–1	5–1	6–1	1–1	5–0	3–2	3–1	4–0	0–0	2–1	1–0	3–2	5–2	5–1	0–0
Bilbao Athletic	1–3	3–1	2–1	2–0	—	4–0	3–2	4–0	2–1	2–0	1–1	1–5	0–0	0–0	1–1	0–2	0–0	0–0	1–0	1–0
Compostela	3–1	0–0	1–0	0–1	0–0	—	2–1	1–0	0–0	5–1	1–0	2–1	4–2	0–0	2–1	1–0	1–0	0–0	1–0	1–2
Cultural Leonesa	1–1	0–0	2–0	0–1	2–0	1–0	—	4–0	1–0	1–1	2–4	0–0	2–2	0–0	2–1	0–1	3–0	0–1	2–3	1–1
Ensidesa	2–1	0–2	1–1	0–2	0–1	1–0	2–3	—	1–1	1–1	2–2	0–1	1–1	2–3	0–0	0–0	2–2	3–5	0–1	2–0
Erandio	0–0	2–2	0–1	2–1	1–0	1–0	0–0	3–0	—	3–2	1–1	4–0	2–0	0–0	2–1	3–0	2–1	1–0	1–0	1–1
Huesca	1–1	1–1	0–1	0–0	1–0	1–0	1–0	3–0	1–1	—	4–1	0–1	2–0	2–2	3–0	2–0	4–2	1–0	1–2	0–0
Lérida	2–1	1–0	0–1	1–1	2–0	0–0	0–0	2–1	0–0	6–1	—	2–1	1–0	3–2	1–1	2–0	2–2	0–0	1–0	1–2
Logroñés	2–2	2–1	2–1	0–2	2–2	1–0	3–2	1–1	0–0	1–1	0–0	—	3–0	2–3	1–1	3–2	1–0	0–2	1–0	2–1
Mirandés	1–1	1–0	0–0	3–0	1–1	2–1	5–0	2–0	1–0	1–2	2–0	2–2	—	2–1	2–0	2–1	0–1	0–2	0–2	2–2
Palencia	1–0	2–0	3–2	0–2	2–0	1–1	2–0	3–0	1–0	2–0	2–0	2–0	2–0	—	1–0	4–0	2–0	1–0	2–0	2–0
Racing Ferrol	0–1	1–3	0–0	1–1	1–1	0–0	3–2	1–0	1–0	1–0	2–1	1–1	8–1	0–0	—	3–0	0–2	1–0	1–0	2–1
San Sebastián	3–2	4–0	1–0	2–2	0–2	1–0	2–1	6–2	0–1	3–1	4–0	1–2	1–1	1–0	1–0	—	1–0	1–1	3–1	0–0
Sestao	2–0	0–0	2–2	1–0	0–0	1–0	1–0	0–0	2–0	0–0	3–0	0–0	2–1	3–1	2–0	2–1	—	3–0	1–0	1–1
Sporting Atlético	3–1	1–0	0–0	1–1	2–2	1–0	1–1	1–0	1–2	3–1	3–1	1–2	1–0	0–1	3–0	0–0	2–3	—	2–1	0–0
Tenerife	0–1	3–1	1–0	1–2	1–0	0–1	2–0	1–0	2–0	5–0	4–0	1–1	1–0	1–1	0–1	1–1	0–0	3–1	—	1–1
Zamora	3–0	0–1	4–0	1–1	4–0	1–0	2–2	2–0	2–0	0–0	1–1	2–0	1–0	2–0	2–0	1–0	0–0	3–1	2–0	—

Source: BDFútbol
Legend: Blue = home team win; Yellow = draw; Red = away team win.

=== Top goalscorers ===
Goalscorers	Goals	Team
(Spain) Luis Alonso	20	Barcelona Atlético
(Spain) Ramón Clotet	16	UD Lérida
(Spain) Pedro Carrasco	15	RSD Alcalá
(Spain) Julio Salinas	15	Bilbao Athletic
(Spain) Casimiro López	15	Cultural Leonesa

=== Top goalkeepers ===
Goalkeeper	Goals	Matches	Average	Team
(Spain) Manuel Llácer	22	36	0.61	Palencia CF
(Spain) Vicente Merino	23	37	0.62	Zamora CF
(Spain) Miguel Roggero	26	35	0.74	Club Erandio
(Spain) Joaquim Ferrer	32	37	0.86	Barcelona Atlético
(Spain) Rodolfo Gómez	33	38	0.87	Sestao SC

== Group II ==
Teams from Andalusia, Andorra, Aragon, Balearic Islands, Canary Islands, Castilla–La Mancha, Catalonia, Ceuta, Extremadura, Madrid, Region of Murcia and Valencian Community.

=== Teams ===
Location of teams in Segunda División B Gr. 2 1981–82
Canary Islands

Team	Founded	Home city	Stadium
Algeciras	1909	Algeciras, Andalusia	El Mirador
FC Andorra	1942	Andorra la Vella, Andorra	Camp d'Esports de les Valls
Antequerano	1939	Antequera, Andalusia	El Maulí
Badajoz	1905	Badajoz, Extremadura	Vivero
Calvo Sotelo	1948	Puertollano, Castilla–La Mancha	Calvo Sotelo
Cartagena	1940	Cartagena, Region of Murcia	El Almarjal
Ceuta	1970	Ceuta	Alfonso Murube
Gimnástico de Tarragona	1886	Tarragona, Catalonia	Nou Estadi
Granada	1931	Granada, Andalusia	Los Cármenes
Ibiza	1956	Ibiza, Balearic Islands	Carrer Canàries
Real Jaén	1929	Jaén, Andalusia	La Victoria
Las Palmas Atlético	1977	Las Palmas, Canary Islands	Insular
Lorca	1969	Lorca, Region of Murcia	San José
Portuense	1928	El Puerto de Santa María, Andalusia	José del Cuvillo
Reus	1909	Reus, Catalonia	Camp Nou Reus
San Fernando	1940	San Fernando, Andalusia	Marqués de Varela
Tarrasa	1906	Terrassa, Catalonia	Olímpic de Terrassa
Torrejón	1953	Torrejón de Ardoz, Madrid	Las Veredillas
Vall de Uxó	1975	La Vall d'Uixó, Valencian Community	José Mangriñán
Xerez	1947	Jerez de la Frontera, Andalusia	Domecq

=== League table ===
Pos	Team	Pld	W	D	L	GF	GA	GD	Pts	Promotion or relegation
1	Xerez CD	38	23	4	11	51	32	+19	50	Promoted to Segunda División
2	Cartagena FC	38	18	12	8	43	26	+17	48	Promoted to Segunda División
3	CF Lorca Deportiva	38	18	12	8	45	28	+17	48	
4	CD Antequerano	38	20	8	10	43	28	+15	48	
5	AgD Ceuta	38	19	8	11	62	38	+24	46	
6	Algeciras CF	38	15	14	9	32	22	+10	44	
7	CF Calvo Sotelo	38	16	10	12	46	35	+11	42	
8	Andorra FC	38	16	9	13	56	44	+12	41	
9	RC Portuense	38	13	13	12	30	31	−1	39	
10	Granada CF	38	13	13	12	34	32	+2	39	
11	Gim. Tarragona	38	14	10	14	38	31	+7	38	
12	CD San Fernando	38	14	8	16	38	40	−2	36	
13	SD Ibiza	38	13	10	15	36	45	−9	36	
14	CF Reus Deportivo	38	11	13	14	32	48	−16	35	
15	Real Jaén	38	12	8	18	43	55	−12	32	
16	AD Torrejón	38	10	12	16	41	49	−8	32	
17	CD Badajoz	38	11	10	17	38	46	−8	32	
18	CD Tarrasa	38	10	8	20	36	54	−18	28	Relegated to Tercera División
19	UD Vall de Uxó	38	7	10	21	24	51	−27	24	Relegated to Tercera División
20	Las Palmas Atl.	38	8	6	24	36	69	−33	22	Relegated to Tercera División

Source: BDFútbol

=== Results ===
Home \ Away	ALG	FCA	ANT	BAD	CAL	CAR	CEU	GIM	GRA	IBZ	JAE	LPA	LOR	POR	REU	SFE	TAR	TOR	VUX	XER
Algeciras	—	2–0	1–0	0–0	1–0	1–0	0–0	1–0	0–0	5–1	1–0	3–0	1–1	1–1	2–1	1–0	1–1	3–1	1–0	1–0
FC Andorra	3–1	—	2–2	3–0	1–0	2–0	2–3	0–0	2–0	2–1	3–0	1–2	3–0	1–1	2–1	0–0	0–0	4–0	4–0	1–2
Antequerano	0–2	0–0	—	1–0	0–0	1–0	3–1	4–1	2–1	1–0	2–0	4–0	1–0	1–0	2–0	2–0	2–0	3–1	1–0	1–0
Badajoz	1–1	3–1	1–0	—	2–1	1–2	0–2	1–3	1–0	1–1	2–3	3–0	0–1	1–1	2–2	1–0	2–0	3–0	1–0	0–1
Calvo Sotelo	1–0	3–0	3–1	0–1	—	2–2	4–1	0–0	2–0	2–1	3–1	1–1	0–1	1–0	2–1	2–1	2–0	2–1	0–0	1–2
Cartagena	3–0	1–2	1–0	1–0	1–1	—	2–1	0–0	0–1	1–1	0–0	2–0	2–1	1–1	0–0	3–1	2–1	1–0	3–0	1–0
Ceuta	2–0	1–2	0–0	2–2	2–0	1–0	—	2–0	1–1	3–0	4–1	0–0	1–1	1–0	8–1	2–0	4–0	0–0	2–0	4–2
Gimn. Tarragona	0–0	2–1	1–1	1–0	3–1	0–4	1–1	—	0–0	2–0	3–0	1–0	1–0	2–0	0–0	2–0	3–0	2–1	0–1	0–1
Granada	1–0	2–1	0–0	2–0	0–0	1–2	0–1	2–1	—	3–1	0–1	1–0	1–0	1–1	0–0	0–1	3–1	1–0	3–2	1–0
Ibiza	1–0	3–1	1–0	0–0	1–2	1–1	2–1	1–0	1–0	—	3–4	2–1	1–1	1–0	1–1	2–0	2–1	2–0	2–1	0–0
Jaén	0–0	1–1	3–0	2–0	0–1	1–2	0–1	0–3	2–2	0–2	—	1–0	0–0	2–0	3–2	2–0	2–2	2–2	4–1	0–1
Las Palmas Atlético	0–1	0–1	0–2	4–2	0–3	0–2	2–3	0–5	2–2	1–1	3–0	—	2–0	0–0	0–1	3–0	2–4	1–0	4–1	1–2
Lorca	1–0	2–1	2–1	2–2	0–0	1–0	1–0	0–0	1–1	2–0	0–0	5–1	—	2–1	3–0	4–0	1–0	3–2	2–0	2–1
Racing Portuense	0–0	2–1	0–0	1–0	0–0	0–0	2–0	0–0	1–0	1–0	3–2	4–1	0–1	—	1–1	2–1	0–0	1–0	1–0	2–0
Reus	0–0	2–0	0–1	1–1	1–2	0–0	1–0	1–0	1–0	1–0	2–1	1–2	1–1	1–0	—	0–0	2–0	1–1	1–1	1–0
San Fernando	0–0	1–2	3–0	2–0	2–1	1–1	2–1	2–0	1–1	2–0	2–1	2–0	2–1	0–1	0–1	—	5–0	1–1	1–0	0–2
Tarrasa	2–1	1–1	0–1	1–3	2–1	0–0	2–1	1–0	0–1	3–0	0–1	2–1	0–0	3–0	4–0	0–0	—	0–2	1–0	1–2
Torrejón	0–0	3–2	1–1	2–0	2–0	0–1	2–3	2–1	1–1	1–0	1–2	2–2	1–0	3–0	4–2	0–0	1–0	—	1–1	1–1
Vall de Uxó	0–0	1–1	3–1	1–1	0–0	0–1	0–2	1–0	0–0	0–0	1–0	2–0	1–2	0–1	2–0	0–2	3–2	0–0	—	0–1
Xerez	1–0	1–2	0–1	1–0	3–2	3–0	2–0	2–0	2–1	0–0	2–1	2–0	0–0	2–1	2–0	3–1	2–1	2–1	5–1	—

Source: BDFútbol
Legend: Blue = home team win; Yellow = draw; Red = away team win.

=== Top goalscorers ===
Goalscorers	Goals	Team
(Spain) Francesc Valverde	20	FC Andorra
(Spain) Narciso Rodríguez	18	UD Las Palmas Atlético
(Spain) Mariano Mansilla	16	Xerez CD
(Spain) José Luis Hernández	15	Cartagena FC
(Spain) Eloy Angulo	14	Xerez CD

=== Top goalkeepers ===
Goalkeeper	Goals	Matches	Average	Team
(Spain) Vicente Gómez	22	37	0.59	Algeciras
(Spain) José Antonio Fernández	19	29	0.66	Granada CF
(Spain) Gregorio de Pablos	26	37	0.7	Antequerano
(Spain) José Palomo	26	36	0.72	Gimnástico de Tarragona
(Spain) Julián García	28	38	0.74	Lorca Deportiva
