= UD Vall de Uxó =

Spanish football club

Vall de Uxó
- Full name: Unión Deportiva Vall de Uxó
- Founded: 1975
- Ground: José Mangriñán, La Vall d'Uixó, Valencian Community, Spain
- Capacity: 4,000
- President: Ximo Guzmán
- Head coach: José Manuel Descalzo
- League: Tercera Federación – Group 6
- 2025–26: Tercera Federación – Group 6, 7th of 18
Home colours	Away colours

Unión Deportiva Vall de Uxó is a Spanish football team based in La Vall d'Uixó, in Castellón province, in the Valencian Community. Founded in 1975, it plays in Tercera Federación – Group 6. Its stadium is José Mangriñán, which has a capacity of 4,000 seats.

== History ==
Unión Deportiva Vall de Uxó was founded in 1975. Previously, there was another club from La Vall d'Uixó, CD Piel, but only played in regional divisions. CD Piel was dissolved in 1975.

== Season to season ==
Season	Tier	Division	Place	Copa del Rey
1975–76	4	Reg. Pref.	6th	
1976–77	4	Reg. Pref.	5th	
1977–78	5	Reg. Pref.	1st	
1978–79	4	3ª	1st	
1979–80	3	2ª B	11th	
1980–81	3	2ª B	16th	
1981–82	3	2ª B	19th	
1982–83	4	3ª	5th	
1983–84	4	3ª	19th	
1984–85	5	Reg. Pref.	4th	
1985–86	5	Reg. Pref.	4th	
1986–87	5	Reg. Pref.	2nd	
1987–88	4	3ª	13th	
1988–89	4	3ª	8th	
1989–90	4	3ª	9th	
1990–91	4	3ª	13th	
1991–92	4	3ª	10th	
1992–93	5	Reg. Pref.	9th	
1993–94	5	Reg. Pref.	1st	
1994–95	4	3ª	6th	

Season	Tier	Division	Place	Copa del Rey
1995–96	4	3ª	13th	
1996–97	4	3ª	13th	
1997–98	4	3ª	12th	
1998–99	4	3ª	15th	
1999–2000	4	3ª	17th	
2000–01	4	3ª	12th	
2001–02	4	3ª	18th	
2002–03	5	Reg. Pref.	6th	
2003–04	5	Reg. Pref.	7th	
2004–05	5	Reg. Pref.	10th	
2005–06	5	Reg. Pref.	7th	
2006–07	5	Reg. Pref.	11th	
2007–08	5	Reg. Pref.	14th	
2008–09	5	Reg. Pref.	7th	
2009–10	5	Reg. Pref.	11th	
2010–11	5	Reg. Pref.	7th	
2011–12	5	Reg. Pref.	6th	
2012–13	5	Reg. Pref.	5th	
2013–14	5	Reg. Pref.	6th	
2014–15	5	Reg. Pref.	2nd	

Season	Tier	Division	Place	Copa del Rey
2015–16	5	Reg. Pref.	8th	
2016–17	5	Reg. Pref.	7th	
2017–18	5	Reg. Pref.	2nd	
2018–19	5	Reg. Pref.	9th	
2019–20	5	Reg. Pref.	5th	
2020–21	5	Reg. Pref.	2nd	
2021–22	6	Reg. Pref.	1st	
2022–23	6	Reg. Pref.	4th	
2023–24	6	Lliga Com.	1st	
2024–25	5	3ª Fed.	8th	
2025–26	5	3ª Fed.	7th	
2026–27	5	3ª Fed.		

- 3 seasons in Segunda División B
- 16 seasons in Tercera División
- 3 season in Tercera Federación

== Notable former coaches ==
- (Spain) José Manuel Pesudo
