= 1974–75 Tercera División =

Tercera División
- Season: 1974–75

The 1974–75 Tercera División was the 41st edition since its establishment.

== League tables ==
=== Group I ===
Pos	Team	Pld	W	D	L	GF	GA	GD	Pts
1	Deportivo de La Coruña	38	24	8	6	69	25	+44	56
2	Ensidesa	38	23	8	7	63	29	+34	54
3	Racing de Ferrol	38	17	14	7	44	27	+17	48
4	Palencia	38	20	8	10	55	45	+10	48
5	Lugo	38	17	12	9	51	38	+13	46
6	Sestao	38	20	6	12	58	47	+11	46
7	Pontevedra	38	15	13	10	47	35	+12	43
8	Bilbao Athletic	38	14	12	12	59	52	+7	40
9	Gernika	38	16	7	15	45	42	+3	39
10	Langreo	38	13	12	13	42	40	+2	38
11	Deportivo Gijón	38	12	13	13	42	41	+1	37
12	Gimnástica de Torrelavega	38	15	7	16	48	49	−1	37
13	Getxo	38	12	12	14	36	44	−8	36
14	Baskonia	38	11	13	14	53	62	−9	35
15	Lemos	38	11	12	15	35	46	−11	34
16	Turón	38	13	7	18	38	44	−6	33
17	Gran Peña	38	9	9	20	43	48	−5	27
18	Atlético Universitario	38	7	12	19	27	48	−21	26
19	Caudal	38	5	12	21	27	53	−26	22
20	Unión Club	38	5	5	28	30	97	−67	15

=== Group II ===
Pos	Team	Pld	W	D	L	GF	GA	GD	Pts
1	Osasuna	38	28	5	5	79	32	+47	61
2	Getafe	38	22	9	7	74	35	+39	53
3	Logroñés	38	19	8	11	51	35	+16	46
4	Castilla	38	17	12	9	64	41	+23	46
5	Mirandés	38	17	8	13	50	41	+9	42
6	San Sebastián	38	16	8	14	63	51	+12	40
7	Carabanchel	38	13	11	14	45	50	−5	37
8	Tudelano	38	14	9	15	52	49	+3	37
9	Pegaso	38	13	11	14	40	48	−8	37
10	Atlético Madrileño	38	15	7	16	50	43	+7	37
11	Colonia Moscardó	38	13	11	14	40	42	−2	37
12	Real Unión	38	16	4	18	39	45	−6	36
13	Torrejón	38	10	16	12	37	41	−4	36
14	Salmantino	38	12	12	14	48	63	−15	36
15	Michelín	38	14	7	17	42	56	−14	35
16	Eibar	38	11	11	16	43	52	−9	33
17	Béjar Industrial	38	13	6	19	40	60	−20	32
18	Calahorra	38	11	7	20	46	66	−20	29
19	Guadalajara	38	9	9	20	37	53	−16	27
20	Arganda	38	8	7	23	50	87	−37	23

=== Group III ===
Pos	Team	Pld	W	D	L	GF	GA	GD	Pts
1	Terrassa	38	22	8	8	59	33	+26	52
2	Levante	38	22	6	10	70	38	+32	50
3	Constància	38	19	7	12	49	37	+12	45
4	Manresa	38	17	7	14	46	42	+4	41
5	Mestalla	38	15	11	12	34	33	+1	41
6	Girona	38	17	6	15	52	42	+10	40
7	Ibiza	38	15	9	14	49	42	+7	39
8	Villarreal	38	16	7	15	39	41	−2	39
9	Ontinyent	38	16	6	16	38	40	−2	38
10	Villena	38	15	8	15	37	41	−4	38
11	Vinaròs	38	15	7	16	37	47	−10	37
12	Olímpic de Xàtiva	38	16	5	17	46	45	+1	37
13	Algemesí	38	11	13	14	38	52	−14	35
14	Calella	38	14	7	17	39	44	−5	35
15	Lleida	38	12	11	15	29	48	−19	35
16	Huesca	38	12	10	16	47	48	−1	34
17	Yeclano	38	13	8	17	52	52	0	34
18	Atlètic de Ciutadella	38	12	8	18	42	52	−10	32
19	Poblense	38	10	11	17	39	45	−6	31
20	Tortosa	38	12	3	23	43	63	−20	27

=== Group IV ===
Pos	Team	Pld	W	D	L	GF	GA	GD	Pts
1	Calvo Sotelo	38	19	12	7	57	26	+31	50
2	Atlético Marbella	38	22	5	11	59	31	+28	49
3	Linares	38	17	13	8	49	35	+14	47
4	Eldense	38	19	5	14	45	34	+11	43
5	Xerez	38	18	7	13	43	40	+3	43
6	Portuense	38	16	9	13	47	36	+11	41
7	San Fernando	38	14	12	12	43	48	−5	40
8	Ceuta	38	17	6	15	49	50	−1	40
9	Badajoz	38	16	8	14	59	45	+14	40
10	SD Melilla	38	15	8	15	43	45	−2	38
11	Algeciras	38	13	12	13	33	35	−2	38
12	Real Jaén	38	12	14	12	33	28	+5	38
13	Balompédica Linense	38	11	15	12	33	34	−1	37
14	Orihuela	38	14	7	17	31	42	−11	35
15	Melilla CF	38	15	5	18	41	60	−19	35
16	Almería	38	14	7	17	53	46	+7	35
17	Cartagena	38	14	6	18	44	47	−3	34
18	Hellín	38	14	5	19	41	51	−10	33
19	Extremadura	38	10	4	24	34	66	−32	24
20	Real Granada	38	6	8	24	26	64	−38	20

== Promotion playoff ==
Team 1	Agg.	Team 2	1st leg	2nd leg
Barakaldo	2–5	Ensidesa	1–2	1–3
Getafe	1–4	Recreativo de Huelva	1–1	0–3
Levante	1–2	Alavés	1–1	0–1
Gimnàstic de Tarragona	3–1	Atlético Marbella	3–1	0–0

== Relegation playoff ==
Team 1	Agg.	Team 2	1st leg	2nd leg
Díter Zafra	2–2	Algemesí	2–0	0–2
L'Hospitalet	3–3	Salmantino	3–0	0–3
Alcoyano	3–3	Michelín	3–1	0–2
Alicante	3–3	Balompédica Linense	3–0	0–3
Manchego	1–1	Melilla CF	1–0	0–1
Orihuela	6–0	Burgos Promesas	6–0	0–0
Huesca	4–3	Sporting Mahonés	4–1	0–2
Atlético Monzón	3–5	Baskonia	3–0	0–5
Eibar	2–0	Motril	2–0	0–0
Compostela	1–2	Calella	1–0	0–2
Castro	2–2	Lemos	2–1	0–1
Almería	10–2	Arenal de Melilla	6–0	4–2
Torrejón	2–1	Tolosa	2–0	0–1
El Entrego	1–1	Lleida	1–0	0–1
Durango	1–2	Getxo	1–2	0–0
Turón	0–0	Peña Sport	0–0	0–0

=== Tiebreakers ===
Team 1	Score	Team 2
Díter Zafra	1–0	Algemesí
L'Hospitalet	1–3	Salmantino
Alcoyano	0–1	Michelín
Alicante	0–2	Balompédica Linense
Manchego	1–3	Melilla CF
Castro	1–3	Lemos
El Entrego	1–3	Lleida
Turón	1–0	Peña Sport

== Season records ==
- Most wins: 28, Osasuna.
- Most draws: 16, Torrejón.
- Most losses: 28, Unión Club.
- Most goals for: 79, Osasuna.
- Most goals against: 97, Unión Club.
- Most points: 61, Osasuna.
- Fewest wins: 5, Caudal and Unión Club.
- Fewest draws: 3, Tortosa.
- Fewest losses: 5, Osasuna.
- Fewest goals for: 26, Real Granada.
- Fewest goals against: 25, Deportivo de La Coruña.
- Fewest points: 15, Unión Club.
