= SD Ibiza =

Spanish football club

Ibiza
- Full name: Sociedad Deportiva Ibiza
- Founded: 1956
- Dissolved: 1997
- Ground: Can Misses
- Capacity: 10,000
- Chairman: N/A
- Manager: N/A
- League: 3ª Group 11
- 1993–94: 3ª Group 11, 16th
Home colours	Away colours

Sociedad Deportiva Ibiza was a Spanish football club based in Ibiza Town, in the autonomous community of Balearic Islands.

Founded in 1956, the club came to play eight seasons in Segunda División B, but disappeared in 1997 due to serious economic problems.

Following the club's disappearance, another side in the town took its place, being named SE Eivissa-Ibiza.

== Season to season ==
Season	Tier	Division	Place	Copa del Rey
1956–57	4	1ª Reg.	4th	
1957–58	4	1ª Reg.		
1958–59	4	1ª Reg.	3rd	
1959–60	4	1ª Reg.	7th	
1960–61	4	1ª Reg.	1st	
1961–62	3	3ª	2nd	
1962–63	3	3ª	3rd	
1963–64	3	3ª	8th	
1964–65	3	3ª	6th	
1965–66	3	3ª	6th	
1966–67	3	3ª	2nd	
1967–68	3	3ª	3rd	
1968–69	3	3ª	12th	
1969–70	3	3ª	5th	
1970–71	3	3ª	16th	
1971–72	3	3ª	14th	
1972–73	3	3ª	5th	
1973–74	3	3ª	5th	
1974–75	3	3ª	7th	
1975–76	3	3ª	16th	

Season	Tier	Division	Place	Copa del Rey
1976–77	3	3ª	17th	
1977–78	4	3ª	1st	
1978–79	3	2ª B	14th	
1979–80	3	2ª B	15th	Third round
1980–81	3	2ª B	14th	
1981–82	3	2ª B	13th	
1982–83	3	2ª B	17th	
1983–84	3	2ª B	20th	
1984–85	4	3ª	7th	
1985–86	4	3ª	7th	
1986–87	4	3ª	11th	Second round
1987–88	4	3ª	2nd	
1988–89	4	3ª	2nd	
1989–90	3	2ª B	19th	
1990–91	4	3ª	2nd	Second round
1991–92	4	3ª	1st	Third round
1992–93	3	2ª B	11th	Third round
1993–94	4	3ª	16th	First round
1994–95	5	Reg. Pref.	2nd	
1995–96	5	Reg. Pref.	4th	

Season	Tier	Division	Place	Copa del Rey
1996–97	5	Reg. Pref.	2nd	

- 8 seasons in Segunda División B
- 25 seasons in Tercera División

== Famous players ==
- (Spain) Roberto Olabe
- (Spain) Óscar Montiel
- (Spain) Tomeu Pascual
- (Spain) Toni Arabí
- (Spain) Antonio Ferrer Díaz
- (Malaysia) Lim Teong Kim
- (United States) Melchior Arnold
