= 1975–76 Tercera División =

Tercera División
- Season: 1975–76

The 1975–76 Tercera División was the 42nd edition since its establishment.

== League tables ==
=== Group I ===
Pos	Team	Pld	W	D	L	GF	GA	GD	Pts
1	Pontevedra	38	24	7	7	65	22	+43	55
2	Barakaldo	38	23	9	6	55	27	+28	55
3	Sestao	38	23	7	8	70	30	+40	53
4	Bilbao Athletic	38	18	12	8	72	41	+31	48
5	Ourense	38	20	7	11	63	31	+32	47
6	Cultural Leonesa	38	15	13	10	49	39	+10	43
7	Gernika	38	14	14	10	41	34	+7	42
8	Deportivo Gijón	38	19	4	15	52	48	+4	42
9	Racing de Ferrol	38	15	10	13	46	39	+7	40
10	Gimnástica de Torrelavega	38	15	8	15	42	43	−1	38
11	Langreo	38	14	9	15	50	51	−1	37
12	Getxo	38	13	9	16	38	39	−1	35
13	Arosa	38	12	10	16	32	34	−2	34
14	Laredo	38	14	5	19	31	52	−21	33
15	Lugo	38	13	7	18	36	52	−16	33
16	Baskonia	38	10	11	17	32	44	−12	31
17	Turón	38	11	8	19	34	75	−41	30
18	Santurtzi	38	7	10	21	26	55	−29	24
19	Siero	38	7	9	22	31	68	−37	23
20	Lemos	38	5	7	26	22	63	−41	17

=== Group II ===
Pos	Team	Pld	W	D	L	GF	GA	GD	Pts
1	Getafe	38	22	9	7	58	25	+33	53
2	Logroñés	38	21	9	8	51	34	+17	51
3	Castilla	38	21	8	9	72	36	+36	50
4	Real Unión	38	19	8	11	68	43	+25	46
5	Atlético Madrileño	38	19	8	11	50	33	+17	46
6	Tudelano	38	18	8	12	54	57	−3	44
7	San Sebastián	38	16	11	11	58	54	+4	43
8	Mirandés	38	17	9	12	42	36	+6	43
9	Palencia	38	17	7	14	45	38	+7	41
10	Pegaso	38	16	8	14	54	39	+15	40
11	Talavera	38	13	14	11	45	47	−2	40
12	Carabanchel	38	15	7	16	50	39	+11	37
13	Colonia Moscardó	38	13	11	14	30	32	−2	37
14	Torrejón	38	16	5	17	44	53	−9	37
15	Lagun Onak	38	14	9	15	41	48	−7	37
16	Zamora	38	11	10	17	32	52	−20	32
17	Salmantino	38	8	8	22	41	58	−17	24
18	Alfaro	38	4	14	20	23	65	−42	22
19	Eibar	38	5	10	23	29	65	−36	20
20	Michelín	38	3	11	24	31	64	−33	17

=== Group III ===
Pos	Team	Pld	W	D	L	GF	GA	GD	Pts
1	Levante	38	22	6	10	64	34	+30	50
2	Huesca	38	19	9	10	64	39	+25	47
3	Girona	38	19	7	12	54	40	+14	45
4	Olímpic de Xàtiva	38	16	12	10	44	32	+12	44
5	Lleida	38	17	8	13	53	40	+13	42
6	Sabadell	38	17	8	13	54	34	+20	42
7	Villena	38	15	11	12	49	36	+13	41
8	Gandía	38	17	7	14	44	43	+1	41
9	Mallorca	38	15	10	13	47	44	+3	40
10	Constància	38	16	7	15	47	42	+5	39
11	Ontinyent	38	15	8	15	40	30	+10	38
12	Vinaròs	38	16	6	16	42	51	−9	38
13	Villarreal	38	14	9	15	43	49	−6	37
14	Endesa Andorra	38	14	8	16	40	41	−1	36
15	Atlético Baleares	38	12	12	14	43	47	−4	36
16	Ibiza	38	15	6	17	50	56	−6	36
17	Manresa	38	15	4	19	50	64	−14	34
18	Mestalla	38	11	11	16	42	40	+2	33
19	Masnou	38	10	8	20	47	82	−35	28
20	Calella	38	4	5	29	21	94	−73	13

=== Group IV ===
Pos	Team	Pld	W	D	L	GF	GA	GD	Pts
1	Real Jaén	38	24	7	7	52	18	+34	55
2	Almería	38	21	8	9	64	35	+29	50
3	San Fernando	38	19	9	10	57	38	+19	47
4	Linares	38	16	15	7	48	34	+14	47
5	Algeciras	38	14	15	9	44	34	+10	43
6	Ceuta	38	14	13	11	42	42	0	41
7	Xerez	38	15	10	13	61	45	+16	40
8	Cacereño	38	14	12	12	45	44	+1	40
9	Orihuela	38	16	7	15	41	46	−5	39
10	Jerez Industrial	38	15	8	15	42	45	−3	38
11	Eldense	38	12	13	13	32	33	−1	37
12	Portuense	38	12	12	14	35	35	0	36
13	Atlético Marbella	38	14	8	16	47	47	0	36
14	Badajoz	38	12	11	15	46	43	+3	35
15	Díter Zafra	38	13	9	16	33	43	−10	35
16	SD Melilla	38	14	6	18	51	53	−2	34
17	Albacete	38	11	9	18	37	53	−16	31
18	Melilla CF	38	11	8	19	42	61	−19	30
19	Balompédica Linense	38	10	8	20	26	50	−24	28
20	Imperio de Ceuta	38	4	10	24	27	73	−46	18

== Promotion playoff ==
Team 1	Agg.	Team 2	1st leg	2nd leg
Huesca	2–3	Sant Andreu	1–1	1–2
Terrassa	–	Almería	1–1	–
Cádiz	6–2	Barakaldo	3–0	3–2
Alavés	4–2	Logroñés	3–1	1–1

== Relegation playoff ==
Team 1	Agg.	Team 2	1st leg	2nd leg
Erandio	0–1	Arosa	0–0	0–1
Peña Sport	0–2	Lugo	0–0	0–2
Extremadura	0–3	Atlético Baleares	0–2	0–1
Colonia Moscardó	14–2	O'Donnell	11–0	3–2
Endesa Andorra	0–4	Gran Peña	0–2	0–2
Badajoz	3–2	Atlético Monzón	2–0	1–2
Laredo	4–4	Sporting Mahonés	2–0	2–4
Sevilla Atlético	1–0	Atlético Marbella	1–0	0–0
Guadalajara	3–1	Villarreal	2–0	1–1
Cotillas	0–1	Lagun Onak	0–0	0–1
Júpiter	0–1	Zamora	0–0	0–1
Alcoyano	1–2	Díter Zafra	1–1	0–1
SD Melilla	4–0	Real Avilés	3–0	1–0
Touring	1–4	Ibiza	0–0	1–4
Rayo Cantabria	0–4	Baskonia	0–1	0–3
Valladolid Promesas	0–2	Torrejón	0–1	0–1

=== Tiebreakers ===
Team 1	Score	Team 2
Laredo	3–0	Sporting Mahonés

== Season records ==
- Most wins: 24, Pontevedra and Real Jaén.
- Most draws: 15, Linares and Algeciras.
- Most losses: 29, Calella.
- Most goals for: 72, Bilbao Athletic and Castilla.
- Most goals against: 94, Calella.
- Most points: 55, Pontevedra and Real Jaén.
- Fewest wins: 3, Michelín.
- Fewest draws: 4, Deportivo Gijón and Manresa.
- Fewest losses: 6, Barakaldo.
- Fewest goals for: 21, Calella.
- Fewest goals against: 18, Real Jaén.
- Fewest points: 13, Calella.
