= 1973–74 Tercera División =

Tercera División
- Season: 1973–74

The 1973–74 Tercera División was the 40th edition since its establishment.

== League tables ==
=== Group I ===
Pos	Team	Pld	W	D	L	GF	GA	GD	Pts
1	Cultural Leonesa	38	24	9	5	63	28	+35	57
2	Langreo	38	20	11	7	57	30	+27	51
3	Pontevedra	38	20	10	8	59	31	+28	50
4	Racing de Ferrol	38	18	10	10	64	38	+26	46
5	Gimnástica de Torrelavega	38	17	12	9	56	44	+12	46
6	Sestao	38	17	7	14	53	43	+10	41
7	Getxo	38	18	4	16	56	46	+10	40
8	Ensidesa	38	15	9	14	40	38	+2	39
9	Lemos	38	14	10	14	34	42	−8	38
10	Lugo	38	13	11	14	52	54	−2	37
11	Turón	38	15	7	16	46	45	+1	37
12	Baskonia	38	12	12	14	43	42	+1	36
13	Bilbao Athletic	38	15	5	18	56	50	+6	35
14	Real Avilés	38	13	8	17	35	44	−9	34
15	Zamora	38	13	8	17	36	45	−9	34
16	Caudal	38	11	10	17	38	57	−19	32
17	Ponferradina	38	10	11	17	43	61	−18	31
18	Rayo Cantabria	38	7	13	18	29	46	−17	27
19	Gijón Industrial	38	9	9	20	31	67	−36	27
20	Erandio	38	8	6	24	38	78	−40	22

=== Group II ===
Pos	Team	Pld	W	D	L	GF	GA	GD	Pts
1	Alavés	38	24	6	8	67	21	+46	54
2	Eibar	38	24	4	10	60	25	+35	52
3	Logroñés	38	19	10	9	43	26	+17	48
4	Castilla	38	20	8	10	58	40	+18	48
5	Colonia Moscardó	38	19	8	11	48	36	+12	46
6	Palencia	38	19	4	15	46	34	+12	42
7	Getafe	38	15	12	11	39	30	+9	42
8	Guadalajara	38	17	7	14	35	35	0	41
9	Tudelano	38	16	9	13	50	36	+14	41
10	San Sebastián	38	14	11	13	46	42	+4	39
11	Atlético Madrileño	38	14	10	14	47	38	+9	38
12	Pegaso	38	16	6	16	54	55	−1	38
13	Carabanchel	38	15	7	16	38	49	−11	37
14	Salmantino	38	15	7	16	49	57	−8	37
15	Mirandés	38	13	7	18	45	55	−10	33
16	Barbastro	38	12	9	17	39	52	−13	33
17	Peña Sport	38	10	12	16	29	46	−17	32
18	Endesa Andorra	38	9	5	24	34	58	−24	23
19	Tolosa	38	5	10	23	22	69	−47	20
20	Osasuna Promesas	38	4	8	26	24	69	−45	16

=== Group III ===
Pos	Team	Pld	W	D	L	GF	GA	GD	Pts
1	FC Barcelona Atlético	38	20	12	6	62	32	+30	52
2	Mestalla	38	19	8	11	41	36	+5	46
3	Girona	38	15	13	10	56	35	+21	43
4	Terrassa	38	17	8	13	56	36	+20	42
5	Ibiza	38	16	10	12	45	35	+10	42
6	Olímpic de Xàtiva	38	14	14	10	38	34	+4	42
7	Ontinyent	38	15	12	11	43	34	+9	42
8	Atlètic de Ciutadella	38	18	5	15	58	43	+15	41
9	Vinaròs	38	14	13	11	40	32	+8	41
10	Tortosa	38	18	4	16	51	45	+6	40
11	Lleida	38	14	11	13	47	49	−2	39
12	Villarreal	38	14	11	13	38	35	+3	39
13	Alzira	38	12	13	13	43	54	−11	37
14	Calella	38	14	8	16	37	39	−2	36
15	Menorca	38	13	9	16	36	50	−14	35
16	Alcoyano	38	12	11	15	38	35	+3	35
17	Gandía	38	12	9	17	32	39	−7	33
18	Europa	38	10	9	19	36	55	−19	29
19	Mahón	38	8	8	22	24	57	−33	24
20	Manacor	38	8	6	24	30	76	−46	22

=== Group IV ===
Pos	Team	Pld	W	D	L	GF	GA	GD	Pts
1	Recreativo de Huelva	38	22	12	4	64	22	+42	56
2	Almería	38	20	12	6	46	23	+23	52
3	Cartagena	38	16	15	7	58	34	+24	47
4	San Fernando	38	18	11	9	56	42	+14	47
5	Balompédica Linense	38	14	14	10	42	37	+5	42
6	Calvo Sotelo	38	17	7	14	46	43	+3	41
7	Eldense	38	15	10	13	52	39	+13	40
8	Portuense	38	15	9	14	41	47	−6	39
9	Orihuela	38	13	12	13	50	47	+3	38
10	Real Jaén	38	17	5	16	59	43	+16	37 (Note: 2 points deducted)
11	Hellín	38	10	16	12	37	34	+3	36
12	Badajoz	38	13	10	15	39	49	−10	36
13	Atlético Marbella	38	12	12	14	38	50	−12	36
14	Melilla	38	13	8	17	43	55	−12	34
15	Ceuta	38	11	12	15	44	45	−1	34
16	Xerez	38	10	13	15	40	44	−4	33
17	Cacereño	38	12	9	17	37	41	−4	33
18	Valdepeñas	38	12	6	20	35	59	−24	30
19	O'Donnell	38	5	14	19	27	50	−23	24
20	Melilla Industrial	38	8	7	23	33	83	−50	23

== Promotion playoff ==
Team 1	Agg.	Team 2	1st leg	2nd leg
Burgos	3–2	Eibar	2–0	1–2
Córdoba	5–4	Almería	3–1	2–3
Mestalla	0–2	Sabadell	0–0	0–2
Rayo Vallecano	5–1	Langreo	5–0	0–1

== Relegation playoff ==
Team 1	Agg.	Team 2	1st leg	2nd leg
Deportivo Aragón	3–4	Bilbao Athletic	1–1	2–3
Real Avilés	2–3	Michelín	1–0	1–3
Arganda	4–2	Zamora	2–1	2–1
Granollers	3–3 (a)	Caudal	2–3	1–0
Carabanchel	3–0	Valladolid Promesas	2–0	1–0
Naval	3–2	Salmantino	0–0	3–2
Arenas de Getxo	0–1	Mirandés	0–0	0–1
Algeciras	3–2	Barbastro	3–1	0–1
Alzira	2–4	Constància	2–2	0–2
Calella	6–3	Catarroja	4–0	2–3
Menorca	2–3	Atlético Universitario	0–0	2–3
Alcoyano	1–2	Villena	1–0	0–2
Atlético Marbella	3–2	Sangüesa	1–1	2–1
Compostela	1–2	Ceuta	1–0	0–2
África Ceutí	1–9	Melilla	1–4	0–5
Díter Zafra	0–4	Xerez	0–1	0–3

== Season records ==
- Most wins: 24, Cultural Leonesa, Alavés and Eibar.
- Most draws: 16, Hellín.
- Most losses: 26, Osasuna Promesas.
- Most goals for: 67, Alavés.
- Most goals against: 83, Melilla Industrial.
- Most points: 57, Cultural Leonesa.
- Fewest wins: 4, Osasuna Promesas.
- Fewest draws: 4, Getxo, Eibar, Palencia and Tortosa.
- Fewest losses: 4, Recreativo de Huelva.
- Fewest goals for: 22, Tolosa.
- Fewest goals against: 21, Alavés.
- Fewest points: 16, Osasuna Promesas.
