= 1970–71 Tercera División =

Spanish football league season

Tercera División
- Season: 1970–71
- Champions: 4 teams
- Promoted: 5 teams
- Relegated: 17 teams
- Matches played: 1,520

The 1970–71 Tercera División season was the 37th since its establishment.

== League tables ==
=== Group I ===
Pos	Team	Pld	W	D	L	GF	GA	GD	Pts
1	Cultural Leonesa	38	28	5	5	90	31	+59	61
2	Ourense	38	28	4	6	59	20	+39	60
3	Sestao	38	26	4	8	78	32	+46	56
4	Barakaldo	38	23	9	6	59	22	+37	55
5	Bilbao Athletic	38	21	10	7	78	30	+48	52
6	Baskonia	38	16	10	12	60	46	+14	42
7	Real Avilés	38	17	8	13	45	36	+9	42
8	Ponferradina	38	16	9	13	63	45	+18	41
9	Ensidesa	38	13	14	11	59	52	+7	40
10	Lugo	38	15	8	15	43	38	+5	38
11	Caudal	38	13	12	13	41	42	−1	38
12	Gimnástica de Torrelavega	38	11	11	16	34	41	−7	33
13	Candás	38	10	12	16	38	51	−13	32
14	San Martín	38	12	6	20	44	72	−28	30
15	Siero	38	9	9	20	45	78	−33	27
16	Lemos	38	8	7	23	40	77	−37	23
17	Barreda	38	6	11	21	34	80	−46	23
18	Toluca	38	9	5	24	32	89	−57	23
19	Vetusta	38	6	9	23	34	66	−32	21
20	La Bañeza	38	6	7	25	32	81	−49	19

=== Group II ===
Pos	Team	Pld	W	D	L	GF	GA	GD	Pts
1	Tenerife	38	23	7	8	62	20	+42	53
2	Valladolid	38	21	10	7	76	35	+41	52
3	Palencia	38	21	8	9	57	37	+20	50
4	Osasuna	38	22	6	10	67	44	+23	50
5	Atlético Madrileño	38	19	10	9	70	45	+25	48
6	Talavera	38	16	11	11	55	49	+6	43
7	Eibar	38	16	10	12	48	40	+8	42
8	San Sebastián	38	15	10	13	56	49	+7	40
9	Mirandés	38	12	15	11	38	34	+4	39
10	Salamanca	38	13	12	13	53	40	+13	38
11	Plus Ultra	38	16	6	16	50	58	−8	38
12	Getafe	38	15	7	16	57	50	+7	37
13	Huesca	38	12	11	15	46	51	−5	35
14	Real Unión	38	12	11	15	38	49	−11	35
15	Calvo Sotelo Andorra	38	15	5	18	40	56	−16	35
16	Tudelano	38	12	10	16	33	44	−11	34
17	Chantrea	38	13	7	18	47	70	−23	33
18	Michelín	38	9	7	22	46	67	−21	25
19	Carabanchel	38	8	4	26	32	70	−38	20
20	Ejea	38	4	5	29	24	87	−63	13

=== Group III ===
Pos	Team	Pld	W	D	L	GF	GA	GD	Pts
1	Mestalla	38	25	5	8	54	21	+33	55
2	Girona	38	21	10	7	53	26	+27	52
3	Terrassa	38	21	7	10	67	42	+25	49
4	FC Barcelona Atlético	38	20	9	9	67	37	+30	49
5	Europa	38	19	6	13	62	46	+16	44
6	Alcoyano	38	19	5	14	45	42	+3	43
7	Calella	38	16	10	12	50	44	+6	42
8	Gandía	38	17	7	14	50	43	+7	41
9	Algemesí	38	15	9	14	50	50	0	39
10	Poblense	38	12	13	13	39	53	−14	37
11	Badalona	38	14	8	16	43	45	−2	36
12	Levante	38	13	9	16	58	51	+7	35
13	Gimnàstic de Tarragona	38	12	11	15	44	52	−8	35
14	Tortosa	38	15	4	19	43	56	−13	34
15	Acero	38	13	8	17	53	57	−4	34
16	Ibiza	38	14	6	18	42	49	−7	34
17	Atlético Baleares	38	11	9	18	38	48	−10	31
18	Júpiter	38	11	5	22	37	63	−26	27
19	Paiporta	38	7	9	22	38	79	−41	23
20	Mataró	38	5	10	23	27	56	−29	20

=== Group IV ===
Pos	Team	Pld	W	D	L	GF	GA	GD	Pts
1	Xerez	38	22	11	5	50	24	+26	55
2	Cartagena	38	23	8	7	66	21	+45	54
3	Recreativo de Huelva	38	21	10	7	58	32	+26	52
4	Portuense	38	17	10	11	41	37	+4	44
5	Sevilla Atlético	38	17	10	11	54	48	+6	44
6	Ceuta	38	19	5	14	55	41	+14	43
7	Triana	38	16	9	13	43	41	+2	41
8	Real Jaén	38	15	10	13	46	34	+12	40
9	Real Murcia	38	15	9	14	47	39	+8	39
10	Valdepeñas	38	14	10	14	48	36	+12	38
11	Melilla	38	12	13	13	43	35	+8	37
12	Badajoz	38	14	9	15	47	49	−2	37
13	Atlético Malagueño	38	12	12	14	40	44	−4	36
14	Español de San Vicente	38	15	5	18	47	46	+1	35
15	Ilicitano	38	13	7	18	37	58	−21	33
16	Balompédica Linense	38	13	7	18	31	47	−16	33
17	Mérida Industrial	38	10	11	17	43	54	−11	31
18	Imperial	38	7	12	19	31	50	−19	26
19	Recreativo de Granada	38	8	8	22	33	66	−33	24
20	Llerenense	38	6	6	26	28	85	−57	18

== Promotion playoff ==
Team 1	Agg.	Team 2	1st leg	2nd leg
Logroñés	3–2	Cartagena	3–0	0–2
Girona	1–4	Villarreal	1–2	0–2
Real Oviedo	4–1	Palencia	2–0	2–1
Ourense	2–4	Langreo	1–1	1–3

== Relegation playoff ==
Team 1	Agg.	Team 2	1st leg	2nd leg
Júpiter Leonés	4–3	San Martín	2–1	2–2
Olímpic de Xàtiva	(t) 2–2	Siero	2–0	0–2
El Entrego	1–5	Lemos	1–1	0–4
Barreda	0–4	Fabril Deportivo	0–0	0–4
Huesca	5–4	Ilintxa	5–1	0–3
Real Unión	5–2	Muskaria	3–1	2–1
Calvo Sotelo Andorra	2–1	Pegaso	1–0	1–1
Tudelano	8–1	Murense	5–0	3–1
Gramenet	2–5	Tortosa	0–0	2–5
Acero	7–0	Extremadura	5–0	2–0
Santoña	2–5	Ibiza	2–0	0–5
Alicante	3–4	Atlético Baleares	3–3	0–1
Atlético Malagueño	3–1	Jerez Industrial	3–0	0–1
Getxo	1–2	Español de San Vicente	0–1	1–1
Ilicitano	4–2	Binéfar	4–1	0–1
Balompédica Linense	8–1	Real Melilla	7–0	1–1

== Season records ==
- Most wins: 28, Cultural Leonesa and Ourense.
- Most draws: 15, Mirandés.
- Most losses: 29, Ejea.
- Most goals for: 90, Cultural Leonesa.
- Most goals against: 89, Toluca.
- Most points: 61, Cultural Leonesa.
- Fewest wins: 4, Ejea.
- Fewest draws: 4, Ourense, Sestao, Carabanchel and Tortosa.
- Fewest losses: 5, Cultural Leonesa and Xerez.
- Fewest goals for: 24, Ejea.
- Fewest goals against: 20, Ourense and Tenerife.
- Fewest points: 13, Ejea.
