= AgD Ceuta =

Spanish football club

Ceuta
- Full name: Agrupación Deportiva Ceuta
- Founded: 1969
- Dissolved: 1991
- Ground: Alfonso Murube, Ceuta, Spain
- Capacity: 6,500
- 1990–91: 2ªB Group 3, 7th
Home colours	Away colours

Agrupación Deportiva Ceuta was a Spanish football team based in the autonomous city of Ceuta. Founded in 1969 and dissolved in 1991, it held home matches at Estadio Alfonso Murube, with a capacity of 6,500.

== History ==
From 1977 until 1991, Ceuta played 13 seasons in Segunda División B. The only exception was 1980–81, when the club competed in Segunda División, finishing 20th and last; on 7 September 1980, the first game in the category was played, a 2–0 home win against CD Málaga, one of 11 during the campaign (the top and the bottom-ranked teams were separated by only 16 points).

In summer 1991, following severe economic problems – which led to the club's relegation to Tercera División for not paying its players – Agrupación Deportiva folded, being replaced by AD Ceuta.

=== Club background ===
- Agrupación Deportiva Ceuta (1969–91)

=== Other clubs from Ceuta ===
- Ceuta Sport Club — (1932–56); renamed in 1941 to Sociedad Deportiva Ceuta
- Sociedad Deportiva Ceuta — (1941–56); in 1956 merged with the Spanish elements of Club Atlético Tetuán to form Club Atlético de Ceuta
- Club Atlético de Ceuta — (1956–); renamed in 2013 to Agrupación Deportiva Ceuta Fútbol Club
- Club Imperio de Ceuta Sociedad Deportiva — (1958–)
- Club Ceutí Atlético (1996–97)
- Asociación Deportiva Ceuta (1997–2012)
- Agrupación Deportiva Ceuta Fútbol Club — (2013–)

== Season to season ==
Season	Tier	Division	Place	Copa del Rey
1969–70	4	1ª Reg.	1st	
1970–71	3	3ª	6th	Second round
1971–72	3	3ª	9th	Second round
1972–73	3	3ª	12th	Third round
1973–74	3	3ª	15th	Third round
1974–75	3	3ª	8th	Third round
1975–76	3	3ª	6th	First round
1976–77	3	3ª	2nd	Third round
1977–78	3	2ª B	3rd	Second round
1978–79	3	2ª B	3rd	Fourth round
1979–80	3	2ª B	2nd	Third round

Season	Tier	Division	Place	Copa del Rey
1980–81	2	2ª	20th	Third round
1981–82	3	2ª B	5th	Third round
1982–83	3	2ª B	9th	First round
1983–84	3	2ª B	9th	First round
1984–85	3	2ª B	10th	First round
1985–86	3	2ª B	3rd	Second round
1986–87	3	2ª B	19th	Second round
1987–88	3	2ª B	5th	First round
1988–89	3	2ª B	2nd	Second round
1989–90	3	2ª B	5th	
1990–91	3	2ª B	7th	Third round

- 1 season in Segunda División
- 13 seasons in Segunda División B
- 7 seasons in Tercera División

== Selected former players ==
- (Spain) Claudio Barragán
