= 1976–77 Tercera División =

Tercera División
- Season: 1976–77

The season 1976–77 of the Tercera División (3rd tier) of the Spanish football started in August 1976 and ended in June 1977 with the relegation play-off finals.

== League table ==
=== Group 1 ===
| Pos | Team | Pld | W | D | L | GF | GA | GD | Pts | Promotion or relegation |
|---|---|---|---|---|---|---|---|---|---|---|
| 1 | Baracaldo CF | 38 | 23 | 9 | 6 | 73 | 31 | +42 | 55 | Promotion to tier two (Segunda División) |
| 2 | CD Orense | 38 | 21 | 7 | 10 | 73 | 48 | +25 | 49 | Remain in tier three (Segunda División B) |
| 3 | CD Ensidesa | 38 | 21 | 7 | 10 | 59 | 32 | +27 | 49 | Remain in tier three (Segunda División B) |
| 4 | Bilbao Athletic | 38 | 20 | 9 | 9 | 53 | 29 | +24 | 49 | Remain in tier three (Segunda División B) |
| 5 | Sestao Sport Club | 38 | 18 | 7 | 13 | 56 | 46 | +10 | 43 | Remain in tier three (Segunda División B) |
| 6 | Racing Club Ferrol | 38 | 16 | 9 | 13 | 47 | 43 | +4 | 41 | Remain in tier three (Segunda División B) |
| 7 | UP Langreo | 38 | 17 | 7 | 14 | 69 | 57 | +12 | 41 | Remain in tier three (Segunda División B) |
| 8 | Caudal Deportivo | 38 | 11 | 17 | 10 | 39 | 32 | +7 | 39 | Remain in tier three (Segunda División B) |
| 9 | SD Compostela | 38 | 16 | 7 | 15 | 54 | 56 | −2 | 39 | Remain in tier three (Segunda División B) |
| 10 | CD Basconia | 38 | 17 | 5 | 16 | 59 | 58 | +1 | 39 | Remain in tier three (Segunda División B) |
| 11 | CD Guecho | 38 | 14 | 10 | 14 | 59 | 57 | +2 | 38 | Relegation to tier four (Tercera División) |
| 12 | Club Guernica | 38 | 15 | 7 | 16 | 38 | 52 | −14 | 37 | Relegation to tier four (Tercera División) |
| 13 | Arenas Club Guecho | 38 | 13 | 10 | 15 | 52 | 64 | −12 | 36 | Relegation to tier four (Tercera División) |
| 14 | CD Lugo | 38 | 12 | 10 | 16 | 43 | 47 | −4 | 34 | Relegation to tier four (Tercera División) |
| 15 | CD Gijón | 38 | 10 | 14 | 14 | 41 | 52 | −11 | 34 | Relegation to tier four (Tercera División) |
| 16 | Gimnástica Torrelavega | 38 | 12 | 9 | 17 | 43 | 57 | −14 | 33 | Relegation to tier four (Tercera División) |
| 17 | CD Naval | 38 | 12 | 6 | 20 | 41 | 60 | −19 | 30 | Relegation to tier four (Tercera División) |
| 18 | Arosa SC | 38 | 8 | 12 | 18 | 36 | 54 | −18 | 28 | Relegation to tier four (Tercera División) |
| 19 | Gran Peña Celtista | 38 | 8 | 11 | 19 | 42 | 65 | −23 | 27 | Relegation playoff |
| 20 | CD Laredo | 38 | 3 | 13 | 22 | 31 | 68 | −37 | 19 | Relegation playoff |

=== Group 2 ===
| Pos | Team | Pld | W | D | L | GF | GA | GD | Pts | Promotion or relegation |
|---|---|---|---|---|---|---|---|---|---|---|
| 1 | CA Osasuna | 38 | 23 | 9 | 6 | 68 | 20 | +48 | 55 | Promotion to tier two (Segunda División) |
| 2 | Cultural Dep. Leonesa | 38 | 23 | 8 | 7 | 72 | 30 | +42 | 54 | Remain in tier three (Segunda División B) |
| 3 | CD Pegaso | 38 | 20 | 10 | 8 | 65 | 35 | +30 | 50 | Remain in tier three (Segunda División B) |
| 4 | Castilla CF | 38 | 21 | 8 | 9 | 76 | 38 | +38 | 50 | Remain in tier three (Segunda División B) |
| 5 | At. Madrileño | 38 | 18 | 11 | 9 | 58 | 37 | +21 | 47 | Remain in tier three (Segunda División B) |
| 6 | CD Mirandés | 38 | 19 | 7 | 12 | 60 | 45 | +15 | 45 | Remain in tier three (Segunda División B) |
| 7 | Real Unión Club | 38 | 14 | 12 | 12 | 51 | 54 | −3 | 40 | Remain in tier three (Segunda División B) |
| 8 | Palencia CF | 38 | 14 | 12 | 12 | 42 | 40 | +2 | 40 | Remain in tier three (Segunda División B) |
| 9 | CD Tudelano | 38 | 14 | 11 | 13 | 42 | 45 | −3 | 39 | Remain in tier three (Segunda División B) |
| 10 | AD Torrejón | 38 | 12 | 14 | 12 | 38 | 39 | −1 | 38 | Remain in tier three (Segunda División B) |
| 11 | SD Ponferradina | 38 | 15 | 6 | 17 | 47 | 69 | −22 | 36 | Relegation to tier four (Tercera División) |
| 12 | San Sebastián CF | 38 | 14 | 6 | 18 | 49 | 54 | −5 | 34 | Relegation to tier four (Tercera División) |
| 13 | CD Logroñés | 38 | 9 | 14 | 15 | 39 | 51 | −12 | 32 | Relegation to tier four (Tercera División) |
| 14 | CD Colonia Moscardó | 38 | 11 | 10 | 17 | 38 | 50 | −12 | 32 | Relegation to tier four (Tercera División) |
| 15 | Zamora CF | 38 | 12 | 7 | 19 | 37 | 66 | −29 | 31 | Relegation to tier four (Tercera División) |
| 16 | Talavera CF | 38 | 11 | 9 | 18 | 44 | 71 | −27 | 31 | Relegation to tier four (Tercera División) |
| 17 | CD Carabanchel | 38 | 13 | 5 | 20 | 45 | 65 | −20 | 31 | Relegation to tier four (Tercera División) |
| 18 | CD Calahorra | 38 | 6 | 15 | 17 | 36 | 55 | −19 | 27 | Relegation to tier four (Tercera División) |
| 19 | CD Lagún Onak | 38 | 7 | 10 | 21 | 41 | 60 | −19 | 24 | Relegation playoff |
| 20 | CD Touring | 38 | 6 | 12 | 20 | 41 | 65 | −24 | 24 | Relegation playoff |

=== Group 3 ===
| Pos | Team | Pld | W | D | L | GF | GA | GD | Pts | Promotion or relegation |
|---|---|---|---|---|---|---|---|---|---|---|
| 1 | CD Sabadell CF | 38 | 20 | 8 | 10 | 61 | 33 | +28 | 48 | Promotion to tier two (Segunda División) |
| 2 | Gerona CF | 38 | 20 | 6 | 12 | 71 | 39 | +32 | 46 | Remain in tier three (Segunda División B) |
| 3 | RCD Mallorca | 38 | 20 | 6 | 12 | 59 | 42 | +17 | 46 | Remain in tier three (Segunda División B) |
| 4 | CD Eldense | 38 | 21 | 3 | 14 | 54 | 42 | +12 | 45 | Remain in tier three (Segunda División B) |
| 5 | CD Olímpico Játiva | 38 | 13 | 17 | 8 | 45 | 32 | +13 | 43 | Remain in tier three (Segunda División B) |
| 6 | CD Atlético Baleares | 38 | 13 | 15 | 10 | 39 | 29 | +10 | 41 | Remain in tier three (Segunda División B) |
| 7 | Vinaroz CF | 38 | 14 | 11 | 13 | 45 | 51 | −6 | 39 | Remain in tier three (Segunda División B) |
| 8 | SD Huesca | 38 | 14 | 11 | 13 | 47 | 41 | +6 | 39 | Remain in tier three (Segunda División B) |
| 9 | UD Lérida | 38 | 14 | 10 | 14 | 58 | 53 | +5 | 38 | Remain in tier three (Segunda División B) |
| 10 | Onteniente CF | 38 | 12 | 14 | 12 | 39 | 35 | +4 | 38 | Remain in tier three (Segunda División B) |
| 11 | Gimnástico Tarragona | 38 | 15 | 8 | 15 | 33 | 36 | −3 | 38 | Relegation to tier four (Tercera División) |
| 12 | Dep. Aragón | 38 | 14 | 10 | 14 | 51 | 45 | +6 | 38 | Relegation to tier four (Tercera División) |
| 13 | UD Poblense | 38 | 13 | 10 | 15 | 33 | 40 | −7 | 36 | Relegation to tier four (Tercera División) |
| 14 | Yeclano CF | 38 | 12 | 11 | 15 | 41 | 55 | −14 | 35 | Relegation to tier four (Tercera División) |
| 15 | CD Constancia | 38 | 11 | 13 | 14 | 32 | 47 | −15 | 35 | Relegation to tier four (Tercera División) |
| 16 | Villena CF | 38 | 10 | 14 | 14 | 43 | 59 | −16 | 34 | Relegation to tier four (Tercera División) |
| 17 | SD Ibiza | 38 | 11 | 12 | 15 | 33 | 45 | −12 | 34 | Relegation to tier four (Tercera División) |
| 18 | CF Gandía | 38 | 11 | 11 | 16 | 32 | 52 | −20 | 33 | Relegation to tier four (Tercera División) |
| 19 | Reus Deportivo | 38 | 10 | 12 | 16 | 38 | 41 | −3 | 32 | Relegation playoff |
| 20 | CD Acero | 38 | 7 | 8 | 23 | 27 | 64 | −37 | 22 | Relegation playoff |

=== Group 4 ===
| Pos | Team | Pld | W | D | L | GF | GA | GD | Pts | Promotion or relegation |
|---|---|---|---|---|---|---|---|---|---|---|
| 1 | Real Murcia CF | 36 | 23 | 7 | 6 | 73 | 25 | +48 | 53 | Promotion to tier two (Segunda División) |
| 2 | Ag.D. Ceuta | 36 | 18 | 10 | 8 | 59 | 30 | +29 | 46 | Remain in tier three (Segunda División B) |
| 3 | AD Almería | 36 | 19 | 7 | 10 | 68 | 34 | +34 | 45 | Remain in tier three (Segunda División B) |
| 4 | Linares CF | 36 | 17 | 10 | 9 | 38 | 25 | +13 | 44 | Remain in tier three (Segunda División B) |
| 5 | CD Díter Zafra | 36 | 14 | 14 | 8 | 50 | 40 | +10 | 42 | Remain in tier three (Segunda División B) |
| 6 | CD Badajoz | 36 | 16 | 8 | 12 | 47 | 50 | −3 | 40 | Remain in tier three (Segunda División B) |
| 7 | Algeciras CF | 36 | 16 | 8 | 12 | 42 | 41 | +1 | 40 | Remain in tier three (Segunda División B) |
| 8 | Xerez CD | 36 | 14 | 9 | 13 | 51 | 41 | +10 | 37 | Remain in tier three (Segunda División B) |
| 9 | Racing Club Portuense | 36 | 13 | 11 | 12 | 43 | 39 | +4 | 37 | Remain in tier three (Segunda División B) |
| 10 | Sevilla Atlético | 36 | 11 | 14 | 11 | 39 | 46 | −7 | 36 | Remain in tier three (Segunda División B) |
| 11 | CD Cacereño | 36 | 12 | 11 | 13 | 41 | 49 | −8 | 35 | Relegation to tier four (Tercera División) |
| 12 | Jerez Industrial | 36 | 10 | 13 | 13 | 32 | 51 | −19 | 33 | Relegation to tier four (Tercera División) |
| 13 | CD San Fernando | 36 | 8 | 13 | 15 | 38 | 48 | −10 | 29 | Relegation to tier four (Tercera División) |
| 14 | CD Valdepeñas | 36 | 8 | 13 | 15 | 40 | 50 | −10 | 29 | Relegation to tier four (Tercera División) |
| 15 | Mérida Industrial | 36 | 11 | 7 | 18 | 32 | 51 | −19 | 29 | Relegation to tier four (Tercera División) |
| 16 | Gimnástico Melilla | 36 | 10 | 8 | 18 | 38 | 51 | −13 | 28 | Relegation to tier four (Tercera División) |
| 17 | Orihuela Deportiva CF | 36 | 10 | 8 | 18 | 31 | 55 | −24 | 28 | Relegation to tier four (Tercera División) |
| 18 | Guadalajara | 36 | 7 | 13 | 16 | 45 | 57 | −12 | 27 | Relegation to tier four (Tercera División) |
| 19 | Betis Dep. Balompié | 36 | 9 | 8 | 19 | 42 | 66 | −24 | 26 | Relegation playoff |
| 20 | SD Melilla | 0 | - | - | - | - | - | — | 0 | Retired |

== Relegation play-off ==
| Team 1 | Agg. | Team 2 | 1st leg | 2nd leg |
|---|---|---|---|---|
| UD Montijo | 5-3 | CD Lagún Onak | 4-0 | 1-3 |
| Betis Deportivo | 6-2 | Castro CF | 1-0 | 5-2 |
| CD Turón | 2-1 | CD Laredo | 2-0 | 0-1 |
| Melilla Industrial | 1-3 | Gran Peña Celtista | 0-2 | 1-1 |
| Peña Azagresa | 5-6 | Reus Deportivo | 4-2 | 1-4 |
| CD Touring | 3-5 | UD Porreras | 3-0 | 0-5 |
| Callosa Deportiva | 1-3 | CD Acero | 1-0 | 0-3 |

- Relegation to Tercera (tier 4): Betis Dep., Reus, Acero, Gran Peña
- Promotion to Tercera (tier 4): Montijo, Turón, Porreras, Gijón Industrial
- Relegation to Regional (tier 5): Laredo, Lagun Onak, Touring, Melilla
