= Racing Club Portuense =

Racing Portuense
- Full name: Racing Club Portuense
- Founded: 10 February 1928; 98 years ago
- Ground: José del Cuvillo, El Puerto de Santa María, Andalusia, Spain
- Capacity: 8,600
- President: Jesús Rodríguez Vargas
- Head coach: Simon Carro Juan
- League: Tercera Federación – Group 10
- 2025–26: División de Honor – Group 1, 2nd of 16 (promoted)
Home colours	Away colours

Racing Club Portuense is a Spanish football team based in El Puerto de Santa María, Province of Cádiz, in the autonomous community of Andalusia. Founded in 1928, it plays in the Tercera Federación – Group 10, holding home games at José del Cuvillo Stadium, with a capacity of 8,600 seats.

== Season to season ==
Season	Tier	Division	Place	Copa del Rey
1928–1943	—	Regional	—	
1943–44	4	1ª Reg.	1st	
1944–45	4	1ª Reg.	3rd	
1945–46	4	1ª Reg.		
1946–47	4	1ª Reg.	3rd	
1947–48	4	1ª Reg.	6th	
1948–49	4	1ª Reg.	6th	
1949–50	4	1ª Reg.	8th	
1950–51	4	1ª Reg.	4th	
1951–52	4	1ª Reg.	1st	
1952–53	4	1ª Reg.	9th	
1953–54	4	1ª Reg.	6th	
1954–55	3	3ª	7th	
1955–56	3	3ª	8th	
1956–57	3	3ª	10th	
1957–58	3	3ª	10th	
1958–59	3	3ª	3rd	
1959–60	3	3ª	3rd	
1960–61	3	3ª	7th	
1961–62	3	3ª	9th	

Season	Tier	Division	Place	Copa del Rey
1962–63	3	3ª	4th	
1963–64	3	3ª	4th	
1964–65	3	3ª	4th	
1965–66	3	3ª	6th	
1966–67	3	3ª	4th	
1967–68	3	3ª	1st	
1968–69	3	3ª	14th	
1969–70	3	3ª	7th	Second round
1970–71	3	3ª	4th	First round
1971–72	3	3ª	6th	First round
1972–73	3	3ª	4th	Second round
1973–74	3	3ª	8th	First round
1974–75	3	3ª	6th	First round
1975–76	3	3ª	12th	First round
1976–77	3	3ª	9th	First round
1977–78	3	2ª B	10th	First round
1978–79	3	2ª B	15th	First round
1979–80	3	2ª B	3rd	Third round
1980–81	3	2ª B	12th	First round
1981–82	3	2ª B	9th	

Season	Tier	Division	Place	Copa del Rey
1982–83	3	2ª B	5th	First round
1983–84	3	2ª B	17th	First round
1984–85	4	3ª	13th	
1985–86	4	3ª	11th	
1986–87	4	3ª	15th	
1987–88	4	3ª	17th	
1988–89	4	3ª	11th	
1989–90	4	3ª	2nd	
1990–91	4	3ª	2nd	First round
1991–92	3	2ª B	15th	Third round
1992–93	3	2ª B	(R)	First round
1993–94	5	Reg. Pref.	8th	
1994–95	5	Reg. Pref.	5th	
1995–96	5	Reg. Pref.	2nd	
1996–97	5	Reg. Pref.	5th	
1997–98	5	Reg. Pref.	2nd	
1998–99	4	3ª	6th	
1999–2000	4	3ª	4th	
2000–01	4	3ª	12th	
2001–02	4	3ª	16th	

Season	Tier	Division	Place	Copa del Rey
2002–03	5	1ª And.	1st	
2003–04	4	3ª	14th	
2004–05	4	3ª	3rd	
2005–06	4	3ª	1st	
2006–07	3	2ª B	3rd	Fourth round
2007–08	3	2ª B	14th	Third round
2008–09	3	2ª B	20th	
2009–10	4	3ª	17th	
2010–11	4	3ª	6th	
2011–12	4	3ª	16th	
2012–13	4	3ª	10th	
2013–2017	DNP			
2017–18	8	3ª And.	5th	
2018–19	8	3ª And.	4th	
2019–20	7	2ª And.	8th	
2020–21	7	2ª And.	2nd	
2021–22	7	1ª And.	1st	
2022–23	7	1ª And.	6th	
2023–24	7	1ª And.	7th	
2024–25	7	1ª And.	1st	

Season	Tier	Division	Place	Copa del Rey
2025–26	6	Div. Hon.	2nd	
2026–27	5	3ª Fed.		

- 12 seasons in Segunda División B
- 41 seasons in Tercera División
- 1 season in Tercera Federación

== Former players ==
Note: this list contains players that have played at least 100 league games and/or have reached international status.

- (Spain) Enrique Montero
