= Orihuela Deportiva CF =

Orihuela Deportiva
- Full name: Orihuela Deportiva; Club de Fútbol
- Founded: 1944
- Dissolved: 1996
- Ground: Los Arcos, Orihuela, Valencia, Spain
- Capacity: 5,000
- 1995–96: Regional Preferente – South, 20th of 20
Home colours

Orihuela Deportiva Club de Fútbol was a Spanish football team based in Orihuela, in the Valencian Community.

Founded in 1944 and dissolved 50 years later, it managed to play two seasons in Segunda División, the first in 1952. After finishing fifth in the 1990–91 season, the club was relegated due to financial irregularities, and disappeared three years later.

== Club background ==
- Orihuela Deportiva Club de Fútbol (1944–96)
- Orihuela Club de Fútbol (1993–present)

== Club naming ==
- Orihuela CF - (1944–45)
- Orihuela Deportiva CF - (1945–96)

== Season to season ==
Season	Tier	Division	Place	Copa del Rey
1944–45	4	1ª Reg.	10th	
1945–46	4	1ª Reg.	1st	
1946–47	3	3ª	5th	
1947–48	3	3ª	11th	Second round
1948–49	3	3ª	12th	First round
1949–50	3	3ª	6th	
1950–51	3	3ª	8th	
1951–52	3	3ª	1st	
1952–53	2	2ª	12th	First round
1953–54	3	3ª	2nd	
1954–55	3	3ª	10th	
1955–56	3	3ª	11th	
1956–57	3	3ª	13th	
1957–58	3	3ª	4th	
1958–59	3	3ª	4th	
1959–60	3	3ª	8th	
1960–61	3	3ª	6th	
1961–62	3	3ª	5th	
1962–63	3	3ª	2nd	
1963–64	3	3ª	11th	

Season	Tier	Division	Place	Copa del Rey
1964–65	3	3ª	13th	
1965–66	3	3ª	10th	
1966–67	3	3ª	7th	
1967–68	3	3ª	6th	
1968–69	3	3ª	15th	
1969–70	3	3ª	12th	Round of 16
1970–71	4	1ª Reg.	4th	
1971–72	4	Reg. Pref.	16th	
1972–73	4	Reg. Pref.	1st	
1973–74	3	3ª	9th	First round
1974–75	3	3ª	14th	First round
1975–76	3	3ª	9th	First round
1976–77	3	3ª	17th	First round
1977–78	4	3ª	17th	Second round
1978–79	4	3ª	12th	
1979–80	4	3ª	3rd	Second round
1980–81	4	3ª	9th	First round
1981–82	4	3ª	2nd	
1982–83	4	3ª	2nd	First round
1983–84	4	3ª	2nd	First round

Season	Tier	Division	Place	Copa del Rey
1984–85	3	2ª B	5th	First round
1985–86	3	2ª B	9th	Third round
1986–87	4	3ª	15th	
1987–88	4	3ª	2nd	
1988–89	4	3ª	1st	
1989–90	3	2ª B	1st	

Season	Tier	Division	Place	Copa del Rey
1990–91	2	2ª	5th	Fifth round
1991–92	3	2ª B	14th	Fourth round
1992–93	3	2ª B	17th	Second round
1993–94	4	3ª	18th	First round
1994–95	5	Reg. Pref.	12th	
1995–96	5	Reg. Pref.	(R)	

- 2 seasons in Segunda División
- 5 seasons in Segunda División B
- 38 seasons in Tercera División
