= Enrique Magdaleno =

Spanish footballer

Personal information
- Full name: Enrique Magdaleno Díaz
- Date of birth: 4 November 1955 (age 70)
- Place of birth: Madrid, Spain
- Height: 1.79 m (5 ft 10 1/2 in)
- Position: Forward

Youth career
- Villarrosa
- 1968–1974: Real Madrid

Senior career*
Years	Team	Apps	(Gls)
1974–1976	Castilla		
1976–1979	Levante	68	(27)
1979–1981	Burgos	55	(19)
1981–1985	Sevilla	105	(28)
1985–1988	Mallorca	106	(43)
1988–1990	Real Burgos	65	(16)
1990–1991	Alcalá	10	(0)
Total		409	(133)
- * Club domestic league appearances and goals

Enrique Magdaleno Díaz (born 4 November 1955 in Madrid) is a Spanish former professional footballer who played as a forward.

== Honours ==
Real Burgos

- Segunda División: 1989–90

Individual

- Pichichi Trophy: (Segunda División): 1980–81
