= CD Ensidesa =

Spanish football club

Ensidesa
- Full name: Club Deportivo Ensidesa
- Founded: 1956
- Dissolved: 1983
- Ground: Santa Bárbara/Juan Muro de Zaro, Avilés, Asturias, Spain
- Capacity: 1,500
- League: 3ª - Group 2
- 1982–83: 3ª - Group 2, 1st
Home colours

Club Deportivo Ensidesa is a former Spanish football team based in Asturias.

== History ==
Ensidesa was founded in 1956, as Club Deportivo Llaranes. The club carried this name until 1965, being then bought by company ENSIDESA and renamed as Club Deportivo Ensidesa.

Ensidesa was promoted to Segunda División following a second-place finish in its group the 1974-75 Tercera División and a 2-5 aggregate win over Barakaldo CF

The club played in Segunda División for one season in 1975-76 but were relegated straight back after finishing 18th.

In 1983, Ensidesa was merged with Real Avilés CF. The latter was renamed into Real Avilés Industrial CF.

=== Club names ===
- Club Deportivo Llaranes - (1956–65)
- Club Deportivo Ensidesa - (1965–83)

== Season to season ==
- Llaranes:

Season	Tier	Division	Place	Copa del Rey
1956–57	5	2ª Reg.	6th	
1957–58	5	2ª Reg.	7th	
1958–59	5	2ª Reg.	1st	
1959–60	5	2ª Reg.	2nd	
1960–61	4	1ª Reg.	2nd	
1961–62	3	3ª	6th	
1962–63	3	3ª	2nd	
1963–64	3	3ª	4th	
1964–65	3	3ª	7th	

- Ensidesa:

Season	Tier	Division	Place	Copa del Rey
1965–66	3	3ª	5th	
1966–67	3	3ª	6th	
1967–68	3	3ª	2nd	
1968–69	3	3ª	4th	
1969–70	3	3ª	3rd	Second round
1970–71	3	3ª	9th	First round
1971–72	3	3ª	5th	First round
1972–73	3	3ª	2nd	First round
1973–74	3	3ª	8th	Third round

Season	Tier	Division	Place	Copa del Rey
1974–75	3	3ª	2nd	Third round
1975–76	2	2ª	18th	Second round
1976–77	3	3ª	3rd	First round
1977–78	3	2ª B	14th	First round
1978–79	3	2ª B	15th	First round
1979–80	3	2ª B	15th	First round
1980–81	3	2ª B	15th	
1981–82	3	2 ªB	20th	
1982–83	3	3ª	1st	

- 1 seasons in Segunda División
- 5 seasons in Segunda División B
- 16 seasons in Tercera División (15 on 3rd on 3 tier)
