= AD Torrejón =

Spanish football club

Torrejón
- Full name: Agrupación Deportiva Torrejón
- Founded: 1953
- Dissolved: 2002
- Ground: Las Veredillas
- Capacity: 1,300
- 2001–02: Regional Preferente – Group 1, 13th of 18
Home colours	Away colours

Agrupación Deportiva Torrejón was a football club based in Torrejón de Ardoz, Community of Madrid. The club came to play 6 seasons in Segunda División B. AD Torrejón disappears in 2002 when merges with Torrejón CF to form the current AD Torrejón CF.

== Season to season ==
Season	Tier	Division	Place	Copa del Rey
1953–54	8	3ª Reg.	4th	
1954–55	6	3ª Reg.	12th	
1955–56	6	3ª Reg.	10th	
1956–57	6	3ª Reg.	7th	
1957–58	6	3ª Reg.	3rd	
1958–59	6	3ª Reg.	2nd	
1959–60	5	2ª Reg.	3rd	
1960–61	5	2ª Reg.	4th	
1961–62	5	2ª Reg.	8th	
1962–63	5	2ª Reg.	1st	
1963–64	4	1ª Reg.	8th	
1964–65	4	1ª Reg.	10th	
1965–66	4	1ª Reg.	11th	
1966–67	4	1ª Reg.	12th	
1967–68	4	1ª Reg.	9th	
1968–69	5	2ª Reg.	11th	
1969–70	5	2ª Reg.	2nd	
1970–71	5	2ª Reg.	2nd	
1971–72	4	1ª Reg.	1st	
1972–73	3	3ª	17th	Second round

Season	Tier	Division	Place	Copa del Rey
1973–74	4	Reg. Pref.	1st	
1974–75	3	3ª	13th	First round
1975–76	3	3ª	14th	First round
1976–77	3	3ª	10th	First round
1977–78	3	2ª B	9th	Second round
1978–79	3	2ª B	4th	Second round
1979–80	3	2ª B	8th	Third round
1980–81	3	2ª B	13th	Second round
1981–82	3	2ª B	16th	
1982–83	3	2ª B	20th	
1983–84	4	3ª	19th	
1984–85	6	1ª Reg.	3rd	
1985–86	5	Reg. Pref.	12th	
1986–87	5	Reg. Pref.	8th	
1987–88	5	Reg. Pref.	3rd	
1988–89	5	Reg. Pref.	1st	
1989–90	4	3ª	16th	
1990–91	4	3ª	5th	
1991–92	4	3ª	8th	First round
1992–93	4	3ª	5th	

Season	Tier	Division	Place	Copa del Rey
1993–94	4	3ª	10th	
1994–95	4	3ª	14th	
1995–96	4	3ª	8th	
1996–97	4	3ª	14th	
1997–98	4	3ª	19th	
1998–99	5	Reg. Pref.	8th	
1999–2000	5	Reg. Pref.	11th	
2000–01	5	Reg. Pref.	4th	
2001–02	5	Reg. Pref.	13th	

- 6 seasons in Segunda División B
- 14 seasons in Tercera División

== Famous players ==
- (Spain) Marcos Machín
