= AD Torrejón CF =

Association football club in Spain

Torrejón
- Full name: Agrupación Deportiva Torrejón Club de Fútbol
- Nickname: Aviadores
- Founded: 2002
- Ground: Las Veredillas; Torrejón de Ardoz (Madrid, Spain)
- Capacity: 1,300
- Chairman: (Spain) Ismael Monforte García
- Manager: (Spain) José Luis Sánchez Méndez "Joselu"
- League: Tercera Federación – Group 7
- 2025–26: Tercera Federación – Group 7, 3rd of 18
- Website: www.adtorrejoncf.es
Home colours	Away colours

Agrupación Deportiva Torrejón Club de Fútbol is a team of football in Spain, in the town of Torrejon de Ardoz in Community of Madrid. It was founded in 2002 after the merger between AD Torrejón and Torrejón CF.

The club has two sections: a men's football team that plays in Tercera Federación – Group 7, and their female football division that plays in the Segunda División Femenina, formerly part of the Superliga Femenina.

== History ==
The team base is at 2 other clubs in Torrejon, AD Torrejón and Torrejón CF, who decided to merge in 2002 to form a single professional team in the League, AD Torrejón CF. The clubs trace their emergence back to 1953 when CD Torrejon was first established.

The men's team made their debut for the first time in Tercera División in the 2003–04 season, achieving a good sixth place, and remained in that category 2 seasons until the team fell. In the 2006-07 season, Torrejon was the leader of their group in Preferente, so he returned to Tercera Division. Currently struggle for permanence.

== Season to season ==
Season	Tier	Division	Place	Copa del Rey
2002–03	5	Reg. Pref.	2nd	
2003–04	4	3ª	6th	
2004–05	4	3ª	19th	
2005–06	5	Reg. Pref.	6th	
2006–07	5	Reg. Pref.	1st	
2007–08	4	3ª	20th	
2008–09	5	Reg. Pref.	3rd	
2009–10	5	Pref.	5th	
2010–11	5	Pref.	3rd	
2011–12	5	Pref.	4th	
2012–13	5	Pref.	2nd	
2013–14	4	3ª	16th	
2014–15	4	3ª	20th	
2015–16	5	Pref.	14th	
2016–17	5	Pref.	13th	
2017–18	5	Pref.	5th	
2018–19	5	Pref.	2nd	
2019–20	4	3ª	14th	
2020–21	4	3ª	6th / 1st	
2021–22	5	3ª RFEF	10th	
2022–23	5	3ª Fed.	10th	

Season	Tier	Division	Place	Copa del Rey
2023–24	5	3ª Fed.	9th	
2024–25	5	3ª Fed.	3rd	
2025–26	5	3ª Fed.	3rd	
2026–27	5	3ª Fed.		

- 7 seasons in Tercera División
- 6 seasons in Tercera Federación/Tercera División RFEF

== Uniform ==
- Kit First: red T-shirt with diagonal white stripe, blue trousers and half.
- Second kit T-shirt with blue stripe Diagonal white trousers and half white.

== Stadium ==
AD Torrejón CF plays its matches in The Veredillas Stadium. The field, located in Torrejón de Ardoz, it has capacity for 1,500 people.

== Women's Soccer ==
AD Torrejón's section of female football campaigned in the Superliga Femenina, the highest level in Spain, between 2002 and 2011. The section was opened in 1996, and in its first year was regional champion, quickly ascending to the Superliga. Their greatest achievement came in the 1998–99 season, when Torrejón CF was runner-up Spain. The first team is coached by Laura Perez Torviscas.

In its staff came to play in the year 2002 Milene Domingues, ex-wife Ronaldo and considered one of the best female soccer players.
