= 1978–79 Tercera División =

Tercera División
- Season: 1978–79

The 1978–79 Tercera División season is the 2nd season of Tercera División since establishment as tier four.

== Group 1 ==
Pos	Team	Pld	W	D	L	GF	GA	GD	Pts	Promotion or relegation
1	Dep. Gijón	38	19	12	7	51	25	+26	50	Promotion to the Segunda División B
2	Avilés	38	21	5	12	61	35	+26	47	
3	Ponferradina	38	19	9	10	59	40	+19	47	
4	Cambados	38	16	14	8	55	40	+15	46	
5	Gran Peña	38	18	9	11	58	38	+20	45	
6	Rayo Cantabria	38	17	10	11	50	39	+11	44	
7	Alondras	38	17	8	13	57	39	+18	42	
8	Naval	38	14	12	12	51	46	+5	40	
9	Entrego	38	16	7	15	44	42	+2	39	
10	Turista	38	14	11	13	39	51	−12	39	
11	Gijón Ind.	38	13	12	13	38	46	−8	38	
12	Compostela	38	11	13	14	38	41	−3	35	
13	Arosa	38	14	6	18	58	61	−3	34	
14	Cayón	38	11	12	15	41	50	−9	34	
15	Cacabelense	38	14	6	18	48	74	−26	34	
16	Santoña	38	15	3	20	52	56	−4	33	
17	Fabril	38	12	8	18	35	37	−2	32	
18	Turón	38	10	10	18	45	59	−14	30	
19	Siero	38	10	7	21	39	67	−28	27	
20	Celanova	38	8	8	22	36	69	−33	24	Relegation to Regional

== Group 2 ==
Pos	Team	Pld	W	D	L	GF	GA	GD	Pts	Promotion or relegation
1	Sangüesa	38	18	11	9	73	46	+27	47	
2	Arenas G.	38	17	12	9	41	33	+8	46	Promotion to the Segunda División B
3	San Sebastián	38	15	15	8	58	43	+15	45	
4	Guernica	38	16	13	9	47	35	+12	45	
5	Guecho	38	16	10	12	47	39	+8	42	Promotion to the Segunda División B
6	Tudelano	38	15	11	12	54	40	+14	41	
7	Erandio	38	15	11	12	56	42	+14	41	
8	Aurrerá Ond.	38	13	15	10	37	39	−2	41	
9	Valmaseda	38	12	12	14	39	58	−19	36	
10	Motrico	38	14	8	16	37	43	−6	36	
11	Tolosa	38	9	18	11	39	46	−7	36	
12	Lagún Onak	38	13	10	15	47	51	−4	36	
13	Lemona	38	11	13	14	40	47	−7	35	
14	Munguía	38	10	14	14	36	49	−13	34	
15	Chantrea	38	14	6	18	56	64	−8	34	
16	Sabiñánigo	38	13	8	17	42	52	−10	34	
17	Burgos Prom.	38	11	12	15	41	44	−3	34	
18	Peña Sport	38	11	11	16	39	48	−9	33	
19	Calahorra	38	11	11	16	51	62	−11	33	
20	Basconia	38	10	11	17	49	48	+1	31	Relegation to Regional

== Group 3 ==
Pos	Team	Pld	W	D	L	GF	GA	GD	Pts	Promotion or relegation
1	Vall de Uxó	38	21	10	7	75	48	+27	52	Promotion to the Segunda División B
2	Badalona	38	18	13	7	66	48	+18	49	
3	Reus	38	20	6	12	58	31	+27	46	
4	Endesa And.	38	17	8	13	65	59	+6	42	
5	Andorra	38	14	13	11	51	45	+6	41	
6	Barcelona Af.	38	15	9	14	54	52	+2	39	
7	Olot	38	15	8	15	49	45	+4	38	
8	Figueras	38	18	2	18	73	67	+6	38	
9	La Cava	38	15	8	15	56	50	+6	38	
10	Gavà	38	15	7	16	48	54	−6	37	
11	Sp. Mahonés	38	16	5	17	41	46	−5	37	
12	Monzón	38	14	9	15	44	50	−6	37	
13	Villarreal	38	14	8	16	47	44	+3	36	
14	Júpiter	38	13	9	16	51	59	−8	35	
15	Malgrat	38	12	10	16	38	48	−10	34	
16	Acero	38	13	8	17	39	52	−13	34	
17	Europa	38	14	5	19	53	61	−8	33	
18	Masnou	38	12	8	18	50	63	−13	32	
19	Horta	38	11	10	17	49	72	−23	32	
20	Hospitalet	38	12	6	20	41	54	−13	30	Relegation to Regional

== Group 4 ==
Pos	Team	Pld	W	D	L	GF	GA	GD	Pts	Promotion or relegation
1	Las Palmas At.	38	19	11	8	65	39	+26	49	Promotion to the Segunda División B
2	Talavera	38	19	8	11	61	43	+18	46	
3	Leganés	38	16	13	9	52	42	+10	45	
4	Toledo	38	16	12	10	55	38	+17	44	
5	Numancia	38	19	5	14	61	57	+4	43	
6	Alcalá	38	17	9	12	53	48	+5	43	
7	San Fernando de Henares	38	19	4	15	62	57	+5	42	
8	Aragón	38	15	11	12	56	45	+11	41	
9	Carabanchel	38	14	11	13	51	54	−3	39	
10	Moscardó	38	10	19	9	44	37	+7	39	
11	Gim. Arandina	38	14	9	15	52	51	+1	37	
12	Toscal	38	12	12	14	47	45	+2	36	
13	Venta de Baños	38	13	9	16	36	48	−12	35	
14	Manchego	38	11	12	15	42	39	+3	34	
15	Ciempozuelos	38	13	8	17	48	59	−11	34	
16	Valladolid Pr.	38	12	8	18	52	61	−9	32	
17	Arganda	38	10	12	16	35	51	−16	32	
18	San Andrés	38	11	9	18	35	56	−21	31	
19	Salmantino	38	8	13	17	39	53	−14	29	
20	Almazán	38	13	3	22	45	68	−23	29	Relegation to Regional

== Group 5 ==
Pos	Team	Pld	W	D	L	GF	GA	GD	Pts	Promotion or relegation
1	Eldense	38	24	7	7	65	27	+38	55	Promotion to the Segunda División B
2	Albacete	38	24	6	8	61	25	+36	54	
3	Gandía	38	22	10	6	79	34	+45	54	
4	Alcoyano	38	20	10	8	62	31	+31	50	
5	Cartagena	38	19	7	12	52	35	+17	45	
6	Alcira	38	16	8	14	48	49	−1	40	
7	Poblense	38	14	11	13	40	43	−3	39	
8	Torrevieja	38	16	7	15	52	49	+3	39	
9	Almansa	38	13	13	12	55	51	+4	39	
10	Mestalla	38	15	8	15	54	42	+12	38	
11	Constancia	38	15	7	16	44	49	−5	37	
12	Orihuela	38	13	9	16	37	40	−3	35	
13	Mallorca	38	11	13	14	42	49	−7	35	
14	Español SVR	38	11	10	17	47	55	−8	32	
15	Crevillente	38	12	6	20	38	62	−24	30	
16	Margaritense	38	11	8	19	32	51	−19	30	
17	At. Baleares	38	12	6	20	45	68	−23	30	
18	Villena	38	9	10	19	39	55	−16	28	
19	Paterna	38	10	8	20	34	55	−21	28	
20	Manacor	38	6	10	22	26	82	−56	22	Relegation to Regional

== Group 6 ==
Pos	Team	Pld	W	D	L	GF	GA	GD	Pts	Promotion or relegation
1	San Fernando	38	21	9	8	55	19	+36	51	Promotion to the Segunda División B
2	G. Melilla	38	19	9	10	41	40	+1	47	
3	Linense	38	18	10	10	50	33	+17	46	
4	Mérida Ind.	38	17	11	10	53	37	+16	45	
5	Betis Dep.	38	17	9	12	50	45	+5	43	
6	Villanovense	38	15	12	11	47	37	+10	42	
7	Valdepeñas	38	19	4	15	60	39	+21	42	
8	Úbeda	38	18	6	14	67	52	+15	42	
9	Puerto Real	38	16	9	13	58	41	+17	41	
10	Vélez	38	17	4	17	44	45	−1	38	
11	Rota	38	15	8	15	41	37	+4	38	
12	At. Malagueño	38	13	11	14	40	51	−11	37	
13	Ind. Melilla	38	13	10	15	39	48	−9	36	
14	Jerez Ind.	38	11	13	14	36	47	−11	35	
15	Don Benito	38	12	10	16	52	50	+2	34	
16	Extremadura	38	9	15	14	44	53	−9	33	
17	Carolinense	38	14	2	22	37	55	−18	30	
18	Motril	38	9	9	20	36	53	−17	27	
19	Estepona	38	9	7	22	23	68	−45	25	
20	Iliturgi	38	9	10	19	31	54	−23	25	Relegation to Regional
