= Jorge García (footballer, born 1957) =

Spanish footballer (1957–2020)

Personal information
- Full name: Jorge García Santos
- Date of birth: 10 August 1957
- Place of birth: A Coruña, Spain
- Date of death: 15 December 2020 (aged 63)
- Height: 1.86 m (6 ft 1 in)
- Position: Goalkeeper

Senior career*
Years	Team	Apps	(Gls)
1975–1991	Deportivo La Coruña	254	(0)
Total		254	(0)
- * Club domestic league appearances and goals

Jorge García Santos (10 August 1957 – 15 December 2020) was a Spanish professional footballer who played as a goalkeeper.

== Career ==
Born in A Coruña, García played for Deportivo La Coruña.

He died on 15 December 2020, aged 63.
