= 1980–81 Segunda División =

50th season of the second-tier football league in Spain

Segunda División
- Season: 1980–81
- Dates: 6 September 1980 – 24 May 1981
- Champions: Castellón (1st title)
- Promoted: Cádiz; Racing de Santander
- Relegated: Granada; Palencia; Barakaldo; Ceuta
- Matches: 380
- Goals: 835 (2.2 per match)
- Top goalscorer: Enrique Magdaleno (17 goals)

The 1980–81 Segunda División season saw 20 teams participate in the second flight Spanish league. CD Castellón won the league. Castellón, Cádiz CF and Racing de Santander were promoted to Primera División. Granada CF, Palencia CF, Barakaldo CF and AgD Ceuta were relegated to Segunda División B.

== Teams ==
Location of teams in Segunda División 1980-81

Club	City	Stadium
Alavés	Vitoria	Mendizorrotza
Atlético Madrileño	Madrid	Vicente Calderón
Baracaldo	Barakaldo	Lasesarre
Burgos	Burgos	El Plantío
Cádiz	Cádiz	Ramón de Carranza
Castellón	Castellón de la Plana	Castalia
Castilla	Madrid	Ciudad Deportiva
Ceuta	Ceuta	Alfonso Murube
Elche	Elche	Martínez Valero
Getafe Deportivo	Getafe	Las Margaritas
Granada	Granada	Los Cármenes
Levante	Valencia	Ciutat de València
Linares	Linares	Linarejos
Málaga	Málaga	La Rosaleda
Oviedo	Oviedo	Carlos Tartiere
Palencia	Palencia	La Balastera
Racing Santander	Santander	El Sardinero
Rayo Vallecano	Madrid	Vallecas
Recreativo Huelva	Huelva	Colombino
Sabadell	Sabadell	Nova Creu Alta

== Final table ==
Pos	Team	Pld	W	D	L	GF	GA	GD	Pts	Promotion or relegation
1	CD Castellón	38	15	15	8	45	33	+12	45	Promoted to Primera División
2	Cádiz CF	38	19	7	12	55	37	+18	45	Promoted to Primera División
3	Racing de Santander	38	18	9	11	48	40	+8	45	Promoted to Primera División
4	Elche CF	38	17	11	10	55	44	+11	45	
5	Rayo Vallecano	38	15	15	8	37	23	+14	45	
6	CD Málaga	38	14	14	10	47	45	+2	42	
7	CE Sabadell FC	38	16	10	12	45	44	+1	42	
8	Deportivo Alavés	38	15	9	14	49	35	+14	39	
9	Levante UD	38	15	8	15	36	37	−1	38	
10	Real Oviedo	38	11	15	12	37	39	−2	37	
11	Castilla CF	38	14	8	16	50	44	+6	36	Castilla FC qualified to the Cup Winners' Cup as runners-up
12	Linares	38	13	10	15	36	42	−6	36	
13	Getafe Deportivo	38	10	15	13	41	50	−9	35	
14	Atlético Madrileño	38	13	9	16	44	55	−11	35	
15	Burgos	38	13	9	16	47	52	−5	35	
16	Recreativo de Huelva	38	12	11	15	33	37	−4	35	
17	Granada CF	38	10	13	15	33	45	−12	33	Relegated to Segunda División B
18	Palencia CF	38	12	8	18	30	37	−7	32	Relegated to Segunda División B
19	Barakaldo CF	38	11	9	18	34	46	−12	31	Relegated to Segunda División B
20	AgD Ceuta	38	11	7	20	33	50	−17	29	Relegated to Segunda División B

Source: BDFutbol

== Results ==
Home \ Away	ALV	ATM	BAC	BUR	CÁD	CAS	CST	CEU	ELC	GET	GRA	LEV	LIN	MGA	OVI	PAL	RAC	RAY	REC	SAB
Alavés	—	4–1	2–0	1–1	1–2	1–1	0–1	2–0	1–1	2–0	1–1	1–0	4–1	1–1	3–0	1–0	3–0	1–0	3–0	2–0
At. Madrileño	1–2	—	1–0	3–2	1–1	1–0	1–3	3–0	1–0	2–2	3–1	2–3	1–1	1–2	1–0	3–0	2–1	1–1	3–0	1–1
Baracaldo	2–2	1–0	—	1–1	2–0	2–0	2–1	2–0	0–1	4–2	2–1	1–0	1–2	3–1	0–0	2–1	0–1	0–0	2–0	1–1
Burgos	0–1	0–1	1–0	—	4–1	0–1	1–0	1–0	1–1	0–1	1–1	1–1	3–2	2–1	1–2	2–1	4–0	2–2	3–0	1–1
Cádiz	1–0	1–0	4–0	3–0	—	3–0	2–1	2–0	2–0	3–0	1–0	2–0	4–1	0–1	1–1	3–1	1–2	1–1	3–1	2–3
Castellón	1–1	2–0	1–0	4–1	3–1	—	0–0	2–1	3–0	0–0	3–1	0–1	2–1	0–0	3–1	4–2	2–0	2–0	1–1	2–1
Castilla	3–2	1–1	1–0	5–1	1–2	0–0	—	2–1	1–2	1–1	1–0	1–2	3–0	2–0	2–1	1–0	4–1	0–2	3–1	0–1
Ceuta	2–1	3–3	1–0	3–0	3–1	0–0	0–3	—	1–1	3–2	3–0	1–0	0–0	2–0	3–2	1–2	0–1	1–0	1–0	0–0
Elche	3–2	4–0	4–1	2–1	1–2	4–0	2–1	2–0	—	2–1	1–1	2–0	2–0	2–2	2–1	1–1	0–4	1–1	1–0	2–3
Getafe	0–2	1–1	1–1	0–0	0–0	1–1	1–1	2–0	2–0	—	3–2	2–0	1–2	3–0	1–2	2–1	2–2	0–0	1–0	4–2
Granada	1–0	1–0	0–0	0–1	0–0	2–1	2–1	1–1	1–1	0–0	—	1–0	3–1	0–0	2–0	2–0	0–0	1–3	2–1	0–1
Levante	2–0	3–1	1–0	2–0	1–0	1–0	0–0	2–1	2–1	2–2	0–0	—	1–0	2–4	2–2	1–0	2–0	0–0	0–2	0–1
Linares	0–0	1–2	1–0	2–0	1–0	2–1	2–0	2–0	1–0	2–0	2–3	3–1	—	0–2	0–0	0–0	0–0	0–0	0–0	3–1
Málaga	2–2	0–1	1–1	1–0	2–1	0–0	3–3	2–1	0–2	0–0	2–0	0–3	1–2	—	1–0	0–0	3–0	1–0	2–1	1–1
Oviedo	1–0	1–0	3–0	2–1	1–1	1–1	1–0	0–0	1–1	4–0	1–1	1–0	0–0	2–2	—	2–1	1–2	0–2	1–1	0–0
Palencia	1–0	2–0	0–0	0–1	2–1	1–1	1–2	1–0	3–0	2–0	0–0	1–0	1–0	0–1	0–0	—	1–0	2–0	0–1	1–0
Racing	1–0	1–1	3–0	2–3	0–1	1–1	2–1	2–0	2–2	3–0	2–0	1–0	0–0	3–2	1–0	2–0	—	2–1	2–1	3–0
Rayo	1–0	3–0	3–1	2–0	1–0	0–0	2–0	2–0	0–2	1–1	1–0	0–0	3–1	0–0	1–1	2–1	0–0	—	1–0	1–0
Recreativo	1–0	3–0	1–0	1–1	1–1	1–1	2–0	1–0	0–0	0–1	4–1	3–1	1–0	1–1	2–0	0–0	0–0	1–0	—	0–1
Sabadell	2–0	3–0	3–2	1–5	0–1	1–1	1–0	3–0	1–2	2–1	3–1	0–0	1–0	3–5	0–1	1–0	2–1	0–0	0–0	—

Source: BDFutbol
Legend: Blue = home team win; Yellow = draw; Red = away team win.

== Pichichi Trophy for top goalscorers ==
Goalscorers	Goals	Team
(Spain) Enrique Magdaleno	17	Burgos
(Spain) Juan Señor	15	Alavés
(Spain) Totó	14	Sabadell
