= Estadio Antonio Amilivia =

Association football stadium located in León, Spain

Estadio Antonio Amilivia was an association football stadium located in León, Spain. Originally named La Puentecilla, it was opened in 1955 to host the matches of the Cultural Leonesa when the team was promoted to Spain's first division replacing the old field called El Ejido were the team used to play. It remained the stadium of the team for several years after until it was demolished in 1998 in order to build houses and it was replaced by the club current stadium Estadio Reino de León, the last match on the field was a victory of Cultural Leonesa over Barakaldo C.F.
