= Estadio de La Victoria =

Multi-use stadium in Jaen, Spain

Estadio de la Victoria
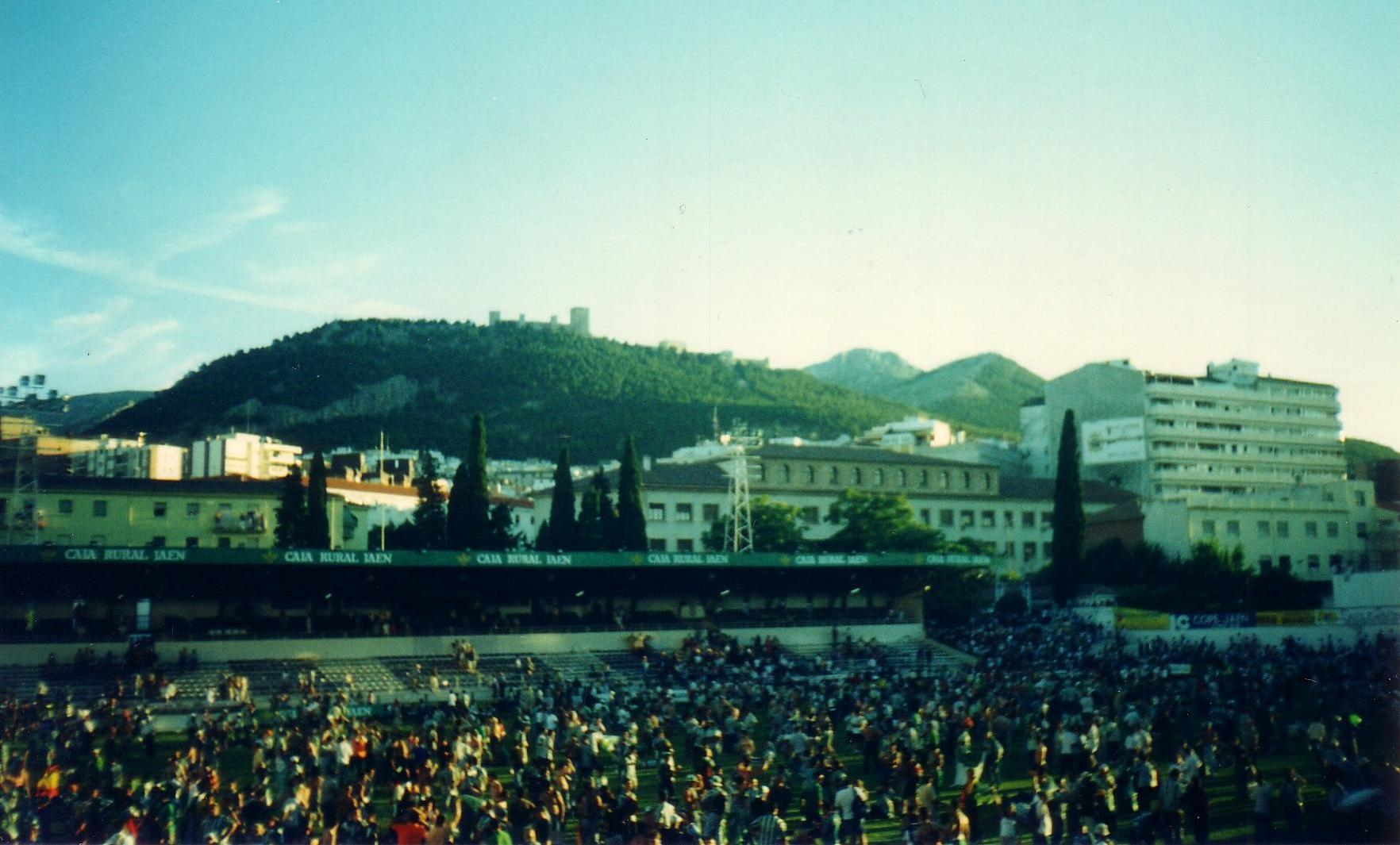
- Interactive map of Estadio de la Victoria
- Full name: Estadio de la Victoria
- Location: Jaen, Spain
- Coordinates: 37.77522°N 3.76734°W
- Capacity: 11,500

Construction
- Opened: October 29, 1944
- Closed: 2001

Tenant
- Real Jaén

Estadio de la Victoria was a multi-use stadium in Jaen, Spain. It was initially used as the stadium of Real Jaén. It was replaced by Nuevo Estadio de La Victoria in 2001. The capacity of the stadium was 11,500 spectators.
