= 1977–78 Segunda División B =

Season of third division football in Spain

The 1977–78 Segunda División B was the first season of Segunda División B, the third highest level of the Spanish football league system. The league was made up of last 4 teams from 1976-77 Segunda División and 2nd to 10th teams from 1976-77 Tercera División. In concept, the Segunda División B was identical to the old Tercera Division, which was now reduced to two divisions. First and 2nd in each group were promoted to Segunda División, and the bottom three were relegated to the Tercera División.

The division consisted of two geographic groups. Racing de Ferrol were the Group I champions and AD Almería were the Group II champions.

== Group 1 ==
Segunda División B (group 1)
- Season: 1977–78
- Champions: Racing de Ferrol
- Promoted: Racing de Ferrol; Castilla CF
- Relegated: SD Compostela; CD Tudelano; CD Basconia
- Matches: 380
- Goals: 1,001 (2.63 per match)
- Biggest home win: Castilla 6–0 Caudal (29 January 1978)
- Biggest away win: Tudelano 1–5 Castilla (23 October 1977)
- Highest scoring: Mirandés 6–2 Bilbao (23 April 1978); Bilbao 4–4 Pegaso (7 May 1978); Pegaso 4–4 Compostela (14 May 1978)

A total of 20 teams will contest the group, including 1 relegated from the Segunda División and 19 promoted from the Tercera División.

=== Promotion and relegation ===
Teams relegated from 1976–77 Segunda División

- Pontevedra CF

Teams promoted from 1976–77 Tercera División

- Racing de Ferrol, Castilla CF, CD Orense, CD Mirandés, Bilbao Athletic, Cultural Leonesa, UP Langreo, AD Torrejón, Real Unión, Atlético Madrileño, SD Huesca, Palencia CF, CD Ensidesa, CD Pegaso, Caudal Deportivo, Sestao Sport, SD Compostela, CD Tudelano and CD Basconia.

=== Teams ===
Teams from Aragon, Asturias, Basque Provinces, Galicia, León, Navarre, New Castile and Old Castile.

Locations of the Segunda División B (group 1) 1977-78 teams

Team	Founded	Home city	Stadium
Atlético Madrileño	1969	Madrid, New Castile	Vicente Calderón
Basconia	1913	Basauri, Basque Provinces	Basoselay
Bilbao Athletic	1964	Bilbao, Basque Provinces	Lezama
Castilla	1930	Madrid, New Castile	Ciudad Deportiva
Caudal	1918	Mieres, Asturias	Hermanos Antuña
Compostela	1962	Santiago de Compostela, Galicia	Santa Isabel
Cultural Leonesa	1923	León, León	Antonio Amilivia
Ensidesa	1956	Avilés, Asturias	Muro de Zaro
Huesca	1960	Huesca, Aragon	El Alcoraz
Langreo	1961	Langreo, Asturias	Ganzábal
Mirandés	1927	Miranda de Ebro, Old Castile	Anduva
Orense	1952	Ourense, Galicia	O Couto
Palencia	1968	Palencia, Old Castile	La Balastera
Pegaso	1962	Tres Cantos, New Castile	La Foresta
Pontevedra	1941	Pontevedra, Galicia	Pasarón
Racing de Ferrol	1919	Ferrol, Galicia	Manuel Rivera
Real Unión	1915	Irun, Basque Provinces	Stadium Gal
Sestao	1916	Sestao, Basque Provinces	Las Llanas
Torrejón	1953	Torrejón de Ardoz, New Castile	Las Veredillas
Tudelano	1935	Tudela, Navarre	José Antonio Elola

=== League table ===
Pos	Team	Pld	W	D	L	GF	GA	GD	Pts	Promotion or relegation
1	Racing Ferrol (C, P)	38	21	8	9	61	31	+30	50	Promotion to Segunda División
2	Castilla CF (P)	38	21	7	10	80	43	+37	49	Promotion to Segunda División
3	CD Orense	38	14	15	9	44	37	+7	43	
4	CD Mirandés	38	17	9	12	58	44	+14	43	
5	Bilbao Athletic	38	16	10	12	75	54	+21	42	
6	Cultural Leonesa	38	18	6	14	49	38	+11	42	
7	Pontevedra	38	16	10	12	43	36	+7	42	
8	UP Langreo	38	19	3	16	49	45	+4	41	
9	AD Torrejón	38	16	9	13	56	52	+4	41	
10	Real Unión	38	16	8	14	46	44	+2	40	
11	Atlético Madrileño	38	14	10	14	39	52	−13	38	
12	SD Huesca	38	14	8	16	56	53	+3	36	
13	Palencia CF	38	15	6	17	46	55	−9	36	
14	CD Ensidesa	38	12	10	16	37	45	−8	34	
15	CD Pegaso	38	13	8	17	58	64	−6	34	
16	Caudal	38	13	7	18	31	50	−19	33	
17	Sestao Sport	38	11	10	17	45	55	−10	32	
18	SD Compostela (R)	38	12	7	19	51	71	−20	31	Relegation to Tercera División
19	CD Tudelano (R)	38	10	9	19	41	58	−17	29	Relegation to Tercera División
20	CD Basconia (R)	38	9	6	23	36	74	−38	24	Relegation to Tercera División

Source: arquero-arba
Rules for classification: 1st points; 2nd head-to-head points; 3rd head-to-head goal difference; 4th head-to-head goals scored; 5th goal difference; 6th number of goals scored
(C) Champions; (P) Promoted; (R) Relegated

=== Results ===
Home \ Away	RFE	CAS	ORE	MIR	BAT	CLE	PON	LAN	TOR	RUN	MAD	SDH	PAL	ENS	PEG	CAU	SES	COM	TUD	BAS
Racing Ferrol		4–1	2–2	1–0	2–1	4–1	2–0	4–1	2–0	3–0	3–0	0–2	4–0	1–0	3–1	2–0	2–1	1–1	2–0	5–1
Castilla CF	2–1		1–0	2–1	2–4	2–1	5–2	4–0	1–2	2–1	2–2	4–1	2–1	0–0	4–0	6–0	5–2	2–1	3–1	4–0
CD Orense	1–0	1–0		3–0	2–2	2–0	2–0	2–0	0–0	1–0	1–1	2–0	1–1	0–0	1–0	1–0	1–1	2–0	1–1	1–1
CD Mirandés	0–1	2–0	2–1		6–2	2–1	0–0	2–0	3–1	1–0	2–0	0–0	3–2	2–1	0–0	4–1	4–1	2–1	2–0	5–2
Bilbao Athletic	1–0	1–2	2–0	0–1		4–1	1–1	2–1	3–3	2–2	4–1	1–1	5–2	4–0	4–4	0–0	2–0	5–0	1–0	3–0
Cultural Leonesa	0–0	0–0	1–2	3–0	3–2		2–0	1–2	4–0	1–0	0–1	2–0	3–1	2–0	2–1	1–0	1–0	3–1	3–1	2–0
Pontevedra	2–1	2–1	1–1	1–0	0–1	0–0		2–0	1–1	0–0	2–0	1–0	1–0	3–0	2–0	2–0	4–0	3–2	3–1	0–0
UP Langreo	2–3	0–2	2–2	2–0	3–0	1–0	2–0		1–0	1–0	2–0	3–0	1–0	2–1	4–1	2–0	1–0	3–0	2–1	2–0
AD Torrejón	3–1	0–4	0–0	2–1	2–1	2–1	1–0	1–2		3–1	2–1	2–1	4–1	2–1	2–3	5–0	1–1	3–0	2–1	5–1
Real Unión	2–1	2–1	0–0	3–1	2–0	1–0	1–0	3–1	1–0		1–0	2–2	2–1	1–0	4–0	2–1	2–1	3–0	3–1	2–2
Atlético Madrileño	0–0	1–1	2–1	1–1	0–4	0–1	1–1	1–0	0–0	0–0		1–1	1–0	3–2	2–1	1–0	1–0	2–1	3–2	2–1
SD Huesca	2–1	0–2	5–0	1–1	1–1	3–1	1–2	1–1	4–1	3–2	1–0		5–1	1–1	0–1	2–1	2–0	6–1	1–0	2–1
Palencia CF	0–0	1–1	2–1	0–3	1–0	1–0	0–2	3–2	2–1	0–0	3–0	2–1		4–0	1–0	1–1	3–2	2–1	2–0	3–0
CD Ensidesa	0–1	3–1	2–1	1–1	3–1	1–1	2–0	0–0	0–1	2–1	1–1	3–0	1–0		3–1	1–0	2–1	1–0	0–0	3–1
CD Pegaso	1–1	4–3	1–2	1–1	2–2	0–2	1–0	2–0	2–0	2–0	3–1	2–1	1–1	2–1		4–0	1–1	4–4	3–1	5–0
Caudal	2–0	0–0	1–0	0–0	0–2	1–2	0–0	1–0	2–0	4–0	2–1	2–1	0–2	1–0	1–0		1–1	3–0	1–0	1–0
Sestao Sport	0–1	0–0	1–0	3–2	2–5	1–1	4–1	2–0	1–1	2–0	1–2	2–1	2–1	1–1	1–0	3–0		0–0	4–0	0–0
SD Compostela	1–1	0–3	2–2	3–1	2–1	1–0	0–0	0–1	1–1	3–2	2–3	3–0	3–0	2–0	3–2	2–1	0–1		2–1	2–1
CD Tudelano	0–1	1–5	2–2	1–1	1–0	1–1	3–1	2–1	1–1	0–0	1–2	2–1	1–0	0–0	3–0	1–1	3–1	3–2		1–0
CD Basconia	0–0	1–0	1–2	2–1	1–1	0–1	0–3	2–1	2–1	2–0	2–1	1–2	0–1	2–0	3–2	1–2	3–1	2–4	0–3	

Source: arquero-arba
Legend: Blue = home team win; Yellow = draw; Red = away team win.

=== Top goalscorers ===
Goalscorers	Goals	Team
(Spain) José Manuel Traba	23	SD Compostela
(Spain) José Ramón Sánchez Argüeso	22	Racing Ferrol
(Spain) Miguel Bernal	21	Castilla
(Spain) Esteban Martínez	20	AD Torrejón
(Spain) José Enrique Mayayo	18	Bilbao Athletic

=== Top goalkeepers ===
Goalkeeper	Goals	Matches	Average	Team
(Spain) Fernando Sánchez	22	27	0.81	Pontevedra CF
(Spain) Millán	31	36	0.86	Racing de Ferrol
(Spain) Luciano Casado	37	38	0.97	CD Orense
(Spain) Javier Maté	39	37	1.05	Castilla CF
(Spain) José Muñoz	41	37	1.11	CD Mirandés

== Group 2 ==
Segunda División B (group 2)
- Season: 1977–78
- Champions: AD Almería
- Promoted: AD Almería; Algeciras CF
- Relegated: RCD Mallorca; CD Eldense; Atlético Baleares
- Matches: 380
- Goals: 902 (2.37 per match)
- Biggest home win: Barcelona Atlético 8-1 Onteniente (14 May 1978)
- Biggest away win: San Andrés 0-4 Levante (7 May 1978)
- Highest scoring: Barcelona Atlético 8-1 Onteniente (14 May 1978)

A total of 20 teams will contest the group, including 3 relegated from the Segunda División and 17 promoted from the Tercera División.

=== Promotion and relegation ===
Teams relegated from 1976–77 Segunda División

- Levante UD, Barcelona Atlético and CD San Andrés.

Teams promoted from 1976–77 Tercera División

- AD Almería, Algeciras CF, AD Ceuta, Gerona CF, Xerez CD, CD Olímpico, CD Diter Zafra, Racing Portuense, Vinaroz CF, Sevilla Atlético, Linares CF, CD Badajoz, UD Lérida, Onteniente CF, RCD Mallorca, CD Eldense and Atlético Baleares.

=== Teams ===
Teams from Andalusia, Balearic Islands, Catalonia, Extremadura and Valencia.

Locations of the Segunda División B (group 2) 1977-78 teams

Team	Founded	Home city	Stadium
Almería	1971	Almería, Andalusia	Antonio Franco Navarro
Algeciras	1909	Algeciras, Andalusia	El Mirador
Atlético Baleares	1920	Palma de Mallorca, Balearic Islands	Balear
Badajoz	1905	Badajoz, Extremadura	Vivero
Barcelona Atlético	1970	Barcelona, Catalonia	Fabra i Coats
Ceuta	1970	Ceuta	Alfonso Murube
Díter Zafra	1930	Zafra, Extremadura	Nuevo Estadio de Zafra
Eldense	1921	Elda, Valencia	Pepico Amat
Gerona	1930	Girona, Catalonia	Montilivi
Levante	1909	Valencia, Valencia	Nuevo Estadio Levante
Linares	1961	Linares, Andalusia	Linarejos
Lleida	1939	Lleida, Catalonia	Camp d'Esports
Mallorca	1916	Palma de Mallorca, Balearic Islands	Lluís Sitjar
Olímpic de Xàtiva	1932	Xàtiva, Valencia	La Murta
Onteniente	1947	Ontinyent, Valencia	El Clariano
Portuense	1928	El Puerto de Santa María, Andalusia	José del Cuvillo
San Andrés	1909	Barcelona, Catalonia	Calle Santa Coloma
Sevilla Atlético	1950	Seville, Andalusia	Ciudad Deportiva José Ramón Cisneros Palacios
Vinaroz	1965	Vinaròs, Valencia	Campo Maestrat
Xerez	1947	Jerez de la Frontera, Andalusia	Domecq

=== League table ===
Pos	Team	Pld	W	D	L	GF	GA	GD	Pts	Promotion or relegation
1	AD Almería (C, P)	38	25	6	7	68	27	+41	56	Promotion to Segunda División
2	Algeciras (P)	38	21	11	6	54	27	+27	53	Promotion to Segunda División
3	AD Ceuta	38	23	6	9	60	29	+31	52	
4	Levante UD	38	18	6	14	53	37	+16	42	
5	Barcelona Atlético	38	18	5	15	59	43	+16	41	
6	Gerona CF	38	18	3	17	48	49	−1	39	
7	Xerez CD	38	16	7	15	54	47	+7	39	
8	CD Olímpico	38	16	6	16	44	41	+3	38	
9	CD Diter Zafra	38	15	8	15	46	54	−8	38	
10	Racing Portuense	38	15	7	16	33	34	−1	37	
11	CD San Andrés	38	15	7	16	34	46	−12	37	
12	Vinaroz CF	38	14	8	16	46	51	−5	36	
13	Sevilla Atlético	38	14	8	16	51	61	−10	36	
14	Linares CF	38	11	13	14	33	41	−8	35	
15	CD Badajoz	38	13	8	17	42	43	−1	34	
16	UD Lérida	38	13	8	17	39	46	−7	34	
17	Onteniente CF	38	13	5	20	38	53	−15	31	
18	RCD Mallorca (R)	38	9	10	19	28	46	−18	28	Relegation to Tercera División
19	CD Eldense (R)	38	10	8	20	41	61	−20	28	Relegation to Tercera División
20	Atlético Baleares (R)	38	10	6	22	31	66	−35	26	Relegation to Tercera División

Source: arquero-arba
Rules for classification: 1st points; 2nd head-to-head points; 3rd head-to-head goal difference; 4th head-to-head goals scored; 5th goal difference; 6th number of goals scored
(C) Champions; (P) Promoted; (R) Relegated

=== Results ===
Home \ Away	ALM	ALG	CEU	LEV	BAR	GER	XER	OLI	DZA	RPO	SAN	VIN	SAT	LIN	BAD	LER	ONT	MAL	ELD	BAL
AD Almería		1–1	2–1	1–0	3–0	2–0	1–0	2–1	3–0	3–0	3–0	2–0	1–1	2–0	0–0	3–1	2–0	4–0	1–1	2–0
Algeciras	2–1		0–0	2–1	2–1	2–0	3–3	2–2	3–1	3–1	1–0	2–1	5–2	3–0	1–0	1–1	1–0	2–1	1–0	2–1
AD Ceuta	3–0	3–2		1–2	1–0	3–0	1–0	3–0	2–0	1–0	1–0	6–0	3–0	3–0	1–0	3–1	1–0	2–0	3–0	4–0
Levante UD	0–1	0–1	1–0		2–1	3–0	1–0	0–2	4–2	0–0	5–1	2–0	2–1	2–1	2–0	2–1	2–0	2–0	4–0	4–1
Barcelona Atlético	1–0	1–0	1–1	2–0		2–0	2–1	1–1	1–3	3–2	0–1	0–1	6–2	2–1	1–0	2–1	8–1	2–0	2–0	3–1
Gerona CF	3–2	0–1	0–1	1–0	2–1		4–1	3–1	2–1	1–0	4–0	2–0	2–0	0–0	1–0	1–1	2–1	1–0	3–0	4–0
Xerez CD	0–1	2–1	4–0	3–1	0–2	3–1		2–1	2–1	1–2	1–0	3–0	1–1	4–1	0–0	2–1	4–1	3–1	2–1	2–0
CD Olímpico	1–2	0–1	1–0	1–2	1–0	1–0	5–1		1–0	0–0	1–0	3–1	3–1	0–0	2–0	1–0	2–1	3–1	3–2	3–1
CD Diter Zafra	1–3	2–0	2–0	0–0	3–0	1–0	1–0	2–0		1–0	0–0	3–2	1–0	1–0	4–3	2–2	0–0	2–1	0–0	0–0
Racing Portuense	1–0	0–0	0–1	2–1	1–0	3–0	1–0	1–0	4–2		1–1	1–1	1–1	0–1	3–0	2–0	1–0	1–0	2–1	1–0
CD San Andrés	0–2	1–0	0–0	0–4	2–2	2–1	1–0	1–0	1–0	0–2		2–2	4–2	1–1	3–0	1–0	1–0	1–0	3–0	2–0
Vinaroz CF	1–3	1–0	1–2	1–1	0–3	2–0	1–2	4–1	5–1	1–0	1–0		3–0	3–1	2–0	1–0	2–1	1–1	2–0	4–0
Sevilla Atlético	0–3	0–0	3–2	3–1	2–1	1–0	3–3	2–0	1–3	2–0	3–1	3–0		1–1	2–1	0–0	0–0	4–1	2–0	2–0
Linares CF	1–1	0–0	1–2	0–0	0–2	1–0	1–0	1–0	2–2	1–0	0–0	0–0	2–0		2–2	2–0	3–0	0–0	2–0	3–0
CD Badajoz	1–0	0–2	3–0	2–0	1–2	1–2	1–1	1–1	0–1	1–0	2–0	3–2	1–0	1–1		3–1	3–1	3–1	2–0	4–0
UD Lérida	1–1	0–0	2–1	0–0	4–2	1–2	1–0	1–0	1–0	2–0	3–1	1–0	1–2	2–1	1–0		1–0	0–0	0–2	1–1
Onteniente CF	1–3	1–0	1–2	1–0	3–1	3–1	2–0	1–0	4–0	0–0	2–0	1–0	2–1	0–1	0–0	0–1		3–0	0–0	2–1
RCD Mallorca	0–2	0–0	1–1	1–0	0–0	3–1	0–0	1–2	4–1	1–0	0–0	0–0	0–1	2–0	1–2	2–0	0–1		3–1	1–0
CD Eldense	2–4	1–4	0–0	1–1	2–1	1–1	2–2	0–0	2–2	2–0	0–1	3–1	2–0	4–1	3–2	1–3	3–0	0–1		2–0
Atlético Baleares	2–1	0–3	1–1	1–1	1–0	2–3	0–1	1–0	1–0	1–0	1–2	1–1	2–0	1–0	2–2	2–1	4–2	2–1	0–1	

Source: arquero-arba
Legend: Blue = home team win; Yellow = draw; Red = away team win.

=== Top goalscorers ===
Goalscorers	Goals	Team
(Spain) Gregorio Mollejo	23	AD Almería
(Spain) Fernando Aramburu	17	AgD Ceuta
(Spain) Rafael López Choquet	17	Xerez CD
(Spain) Andoni Murúa	15	Levante UD
(Spain) Raimundo Aguilar	14	CD Díter Zafra

=== Top goalkeepers ===
Goalkeeper	Goals	Matches	Average	Team
(Spain) Marco	16	26	0.62	AD Almería
(Spain) Nemesio Alonso	27	38	0.71	Algeciras CF
(Spain) José Cervantes	29	38	0.76	AgD Ceuta
(Spain) Manuel Ojeda	34	38	0.89	RC Portuense
(Spain) Jordi Castel	28	31	0.90	Barcelona Atlético
