= Calsita =

Spanish footballer

Personal information
- Full name: Jerónimo Lloret Pellicer
- Date of birth: 31 August 1955 (age 71)
- Place of birth: Alicante, Spain
- Position: Forward

Youth career
- Murcia

Senior career*
Years	Team	Apps	(Gls)
1972–1975	Murcia	0	(0)
1972–1974	→ Hellín (loan)		
1975–1976	Badajoz		
1976–1977	San Fernando		
1977–1978	Alcoyano		
1978–1979	Orihuela		
1979	Vinaròs		
1979–1980	Palencia	4	(0)
1980–1982	Calvo Sotelo		
1982–1983	Poblense		
1983–1984	Torrepacheco		
1984–1985	Avilés	6	(0)
1985–1986	Villajoyosa		

Managerial career
- 1996: Benidorm
- 2000–2001: Alcoyano
- 2003: UCAM Murcia
- 2004–2005: UCAM Murcia
- * Club domestic league appearances and goals

Jerónimo Lloret Pellicer (born 31 August 1955), commonly known as Calsita, is a Spanish retired footballer who played as a forward, and a current manager.

== Career ==
Calsita was born in Alicante, Valencian Community, and was a Real Murcia youth graduate, although he never played for the first team. After spending his first two senior years on loan at Tercera División side AD Hellín, he continued to appear in the same category in the following campaigns, representing CD Badajoz, CD San Fernando, CD Alcoyano and AD Orihuela.

In January 1979 Calsita moved to Vinaròs CF in Segunda División B, but eventually suffered team relegation. In the summer he joined Segunda División club Palencia CF, making his professional debut on 2 September by starting in a 1–1 home draw against Algeciras CF.

After appearing in only four matches, Calsita left the club and subsequently resumed his career in the lower leagues. He retired in 1986, aged 31, with Villajoyosa CF.

After his retirement Calsita started working as a manager, notably coaching Benidorm CF in the third tier, CD Alcoyano and UCAM Murcia CF (two stints).

== Personal life ==
Calsita's father, José and having the same nickname, was also a footballer. A forward, he represented Hércules CF, Atlético Madrid and Real Murcia professionally.
