= 1974–75 Segunda División =

44th season of the second-tier football league in Spain

Segunda División
- Season: 1974–75
- Dates: 8 September 1974 – 15 June 1975
- Champions: Real Oviedo (5th title)
- Promoted: Racing de Santander; Sevilla FC
- Relegated: Mallorca; Orense; Sabadell; Cultural Leonesa
- Matches: 380
- Goals: 898 (2.36 per match)
- Top goalscorer: José Juan Cioffi (22 goals)

The 1974–75 Segunda División season saw 20 teams participate in the second flight Spanish league. Real Oviedo won the league. Real Oviedo, Racing de Santander and Sevilla FC were promoted to Primera División. Barakaldo CF, RCD Mallorca, CD Orense, CE Sabadell FC and Cultural Leonesa were relegated to Tercera División.

== Teams ==
Location of teams in Segunda División 1974-75
Canary Islands

Club	City	Stadium
Alavés	Vitoria	Mendizorrotza
Baracaldo	Barakaldo	Lasesarre
Barcelona Atlètic	Barcelona	Fabra i Coats
Burgos	Burgos	El Plantío
Cádiz	Cádiz	Ramón de Carranza
Castellón	Castellón de la Plana	Castalia
Córdoba	Córdoba	El Árcangel
Cultural Leonesa	León	La Puentecilla
Gimnástico de Tarragona	Tarragona	José Luis Calderón
Mallorca	Palma de Mallorca	Lluís Sitjar
Orense	Ourense	José Antonio
Oviedo	Oviedo	Carlos Tartiere
Racing de Santander	Santander	El Sardinero
Rayo Vallecano	Madrid	Vallehermoso
Recreativo Huelva	Huelva	Municipal
Sabadell	Sabadell	Nova Creu Alta
San Andrés	Barcelona	Calle Santa Coloma
Sevilla	Seville	Ramón Sánchez Pizjuán
Tenerife	Santa Cruz de Tenerife	Heliodoro Rodríguez López
Real Valladolid	Valladolid	José Zorrilla

== Final table ==
Pos	Team	Pld	W	D	L	GF	GA	GD	Pts	Promotion or relegation
1	Real Oviedo	38	18	16	4	52	29	+23	52	Promoted to Primera División
2	Racing de Santander	38	21	10	7	49	34	+15	52	Promoted to Primera División
3	Sevilla FC	38	22	7	9	58	27	+31	51	Promoted to Primera División
4	Córdoba CF	38	19	8	11	59	34	+25	46	
5	Cádiz CF	38	18	7	13	54	43	+11	43	
6	CD Castellón	38	17	8	13	48	39	+9	42	
7	CD San Andrés	38	12	15	11	35	31	+4	39	
8	Rayo Vallecano	38	16	6	16	47	47	0	38	
9	Burgos	38	14	10	14	54	46	+8	38	
10	Barcelona Atlètic	38	13	12	13	46	52	−6	38	
11	Real Valladolid	38	12	12	14	48	45	+3	36	
12	CD Tenerife	38	15	6	17	50	56	−6	36	
13	Gimnástico de Tarragona	38	11	13	14	34	36	−2	35	Relegation playoff
14	Recreativo de Huelva	38	12	11	15	39	43	−4	35	Relegation playoff
15	Barakaldo CF	38	12	9	17	33	54	−21	33	Relegation playoff
16	Deportivo Alavés	38	13	7	18	35	45	−10	33	Relegation playoff
17	RCD Mallorca	38	12	9	17	42	56	−14	33	Relegated to Tercera División
18	CD Orense	38	9	14	15	30	44	−14	32	Relegated to Tercera División
19	CE Sabadell FC	38	8	10	20	54	69	−15	26	Relegated to Tercera División
20	Cultural Leonesa	38	6	10	22	31	68	−37	22	Relegated to Tercera División

Source: BDFutbol

== Results ==
Home \ Away	ALV	BAC	BAR	BUR	CÁD	CAS	CÓR	CUL	GIM	MLL	ORE	OVI	RAC	RAY	REC	SAB	SAN	SEV	TEN	VLD
Alavés	—	0–2	3–0	4–1	1–0	2–0	0–0	2–1	0–1	2–1	1–1	2–1	2–3	1–0	1–2	2–0	1–0	1–1	1–0	2–1
Baracaldo	0–0	—	0–0	0–1	2–1	1–1	2–0	0–0	2–2	2–0	2–0	0–0	2–2	3–2	1–0	2–1	0–0	1–0	4–1	1–0
Barcelona At.	5–0	2–1	—	2–2	2–2	2–2	1–0	1–0	0–0	3–0	3–0	1–1	0–0	2–0	2–1	3–2	0–0	1–0	1–1	1–3
Burgos	1–0	3–0	1–0	—	1–1	2–1	1–1	2–0	1–0	4–0	3–2	1–1	0–1	1–1	1–1	6–0	0–0	1–0	1–1	4–1
Cádiz	4–0	3–0	2–1	2–0	—	1–0	1–0	4–1	4–2	2–1	2–1	2–0	2–1	2–1	0–1	3–2	2–0	0–1	1–2	2–1
Castellón	2–1	2–1	0–1	2–1	2–0	—	1–0	2–0	0–0	4–0	4–1	1–2	1–1	1–0	0–1	3–1	2–1	1–0	1–0	1–1
Córdoba	1–0	6–1	4–1	2–1	1–2	1–0	—	3–0	2–0	5–0	1–0	2–0	3–0	3–1	3–0	3–1	0–0	2–1	3–0	0–0
Cultural Leonesa	1–0	1–2	1–1	1–4	0–0	1–2	2–2	—	3–1	2–0	0–0	1–1	0–1	2–3	0–0	3–1	0–0	1–1	3–1	2–1
Gimnástico Tarragona	2–1	1–0	2–0	2–1	1–1	0–1	0–2	1–1	—	3–1	2–0	4–0	4–0	0–0	1–1	2–2	0–0	0–0	1–0	0–0
Mallorca	0–1	1–0	1–2	1–0	1–0	2–2	1–1	1–0	2–0	—	3–0	1–2	1–1	3–0	3–1	1–0	2–1	1–1	2–0	2–1
Orense	0–0	0–0	1–1	2–0	0–0	1–1	0–1	1–0	1–0	4–2	—	1–1	0–1	2–1	1–1	1–0	3–0	0–1	2–1	0–0
Oviedo	1–0	1–0	1–0	2–2	1–1	1–0	3–1	5–1	2–0	1–0	0–0	—	4–1	4–1	3–1	3–0	2–0	1–0	1–1	3–1
Racing Santander	3–1	3–1	2–1	2–0	3–1	1–0	0–0	2–0	2–0	1–1	1–0	0–0	—	2–0	2–0	2–0	1–0	3–1	2–0	1–0
Rayo Vallecano	2–0	1–0	4–1	2–1	2–0	2–0	1–0	2–1	1–0	1–1	0–1	0–1	2–0	—	1–1	1–0	3–0	2–3	3–0	0–0
Recreativo Huelva	1–1	1–0	1–0	0–0	2–3	1–2	1–0	7–0	0–0	2–1	0–0	1–1	0–0	0–1	—	2–1	1–0	1–3	1–0	3–0
Saabdell	1–1	5–0	2–3	2–3	1–1	3–4	1–1	4–1	1–0	1–1	4–1	1–1	2–2	4–1	2–1	—	0–0	1–1	4–1	2–0
San Andrés	1–0	3–0	2–0	1–0	3–2	0–0	5–1	3–1	1–2	0–0	1–1	0–0	0–0	3–2	1–0	1–1	—	0–0	2–1	2–1
Sevilla	1–0	2–0	7–1	2–1	1–0	1–0	1–2	1–0	1–0	2–1	2–0	1–1	2–0	3–0	2–0	2–0	1–0	—	5–0	5–0
Tenerife	2–1	2–0	3–0	2–0	1–0	3–2	4–2	3–0	2–0	2–1	2–0	0–0	1–2	1–1	4–2	2–0	1–4	3–0	—	1–1
Valladolid	2–0	5–0	1–1	4–2	3–0	2–0	1–0	3–0	0–0	2–2	2–2	0–0	2–0	0–2	2–0	4–1	0–0	1–2	2–1	—

Source: BDFutbol
Legend: Blue = home team win; Yellow = draw; Red = away team win.

== Relegation playoff ==
Home Matches:
Barakaldo CF	1-2	CD Ensidesa
Getafe Deportivo	1-1	Recreativo de Huelva
Levante UD	1-1	Deportivo Alavés
Gimnástico de Tarragona	3-1	Atlético Marbella

Away Matches:
CD Ensidesa	3-1	Barakaldo CF	Agg:5-2
Recreativo de Huelva	3-0	Getafe Deportivo	Agg:4-1
Deportivo Alavés	1-0	Levante UD	Agg:2-1
Atlético Marbella	0-0	Gimnástico de Tarragona	Agg:1-3

== Pichichi Trophy for top goalscorers ==
Goalscorers	Goals	Team
(Argentina) José Juan Cioffi	22	CD Castellón
(Spain) Marianín	20	Real Oviedo
(Spain) Antonio Burguete	19	Córdoba CF
