= 1977–78 Segunda División =

47th season of the second-tier football league in Spain

Segunda División
- Season: 1977–78
- Dates: 3 September 1977 – 14 May 1978
- Champions: Real Zaragoza (1st title)
- Promoted: Recreativo de Huelva; Celta de Vigo
- Relegated: Real Oviedo; Córdoba CF; CD Tenerife; CD Calvo Sotelo
- Matches: 380
- Goals: 925 (2.43 per match)
- Top goalscorer: Alfonso Castro (24 goals)

The 1977–78 Segunda División season saw 20 teams participate in the second flight Spanish league. Real Zaragoza won the league.

Real Zaragoza, Recreativo de Huelva and Celta de Vigo were promoted to Primera División. Real Oviedo, Córdoba CF, CD Tenerife and CF Calvo Sotelo were relegated to Segunda División B.

From this season, immediately below Segunda División there is a new league Segunda División B. Thus, Tercera División became the fourth level in the Spanish football pyramid.

== Teams ==
Location of teams in Segunda División 1977-78
Canary Islands

Club	City	Stadium
Alavés	Vitoria	Mendizorrotza
Barakaldo	Barakaldo	Lasesarre
Calvo Sotelo	Puertollano	Calvo Sotelo
Castellón	Castellón de la Plana	Castalia
Celta Vigo	Vigo	Balaídos
Córdoba	Córdoba	El Árcangel
Deportivo La Coruña	La Coruña	Riazor
Getafe Deportivo	Getafe	Las Margaritas
Granada	Granada	Los Cármenes
Jaén	Jaén	La Victoria
Málaga	Málaga	La Rosaleda
Murcia	Murcia	La Condomina
Osasuna	Pamplona	El Sadar
Oviedo	Oviedo	Carlos Tartiere
Recreativo Huelva	Huelva	Municipal
Sabadell	Sabadell	Nova Creu Alta
Tenerife	Santa Cruz de Tenerife	Heliodoro Rodríguez López
Terrassa	Terrassa	Olímpic de Terrassa
Real Valladolid	Valladolid	José Zorrilla
Real Zaragoza	Zaragoza	La Romareda

== Final table ==
Pos	Team	Pld	W	D	L	GF	GA	GD	Pts	Promotion or relegation
1	Real Zaragoza	38	20	10	8	68	46	+22	50	Promoted to Primera División
2	Recreativo de Huelva	38	18	10	10	51	33	+18	46	Promoted to Primera División
3	Celta de Vigo	38	15	16	7	51	31	+20	46	Promoted to Primera División
4	Barakaldo CF	38	17	10	11	53	51	+2	44	
5	Real Murcia	38	16	8	14	58	55	+3	40	
6	CE Sabadell FC	38	16	8	14	46	50	−4	40	
7	Real Valladolid	38	14	11	13	44	48	−4	39	
8	Deportivo de La Coruña	38	13	13	12	63	47	+16	39	
9	Granada CF	38	15	8	15	46	44	+2	38	
10	CA Osasuna	38	14	10	14	53	47	+6	38	
11	Deportivo Alavés	38	11	16	11	47	40	+7	38	
12	Terrassa FC	38	13	11	14	46	52	−6	37	
13	CD Málaga	38	13	11	14	41	42	−1	37	
14	CD Castellón	38	10	15	13	34	37	−3	35	
15	Real Jaén	38	9	17	12	38	42	−4	35	
16	Getafe Deportivo	38	12	11	15	32	44	−12	35	
17	Real Oviedo	38	12	11	15	40	42	−2	35	Relegated to Segunda División B
18	Córdoba CF	38	8	16	14	37	46	−9	32	Relegated to Segunda División B
19	CD Tenerife	38	11	9	18	34	52	−18	31	Relegated to Segunda División B
20	CF Calvo Sotelo	38	8	9	21	43	76	−33	25	Relegated to Segunda División B

Source: BDFutbol

== Results ==
Home \ Away	ALV	BAK	CAL	CAS	CEL	CÓR	DEP	GET	GRA	JAÉ	MGA	MUR	OSA	OVI	REC	SAB	TEN	TER	VLD	ZAR
Alavés	—	0–2	4–0	1–0	1–1	1–0	1–1	1–1	0–0	3–1	2–0	4–0	0–0	3–0	1–0	0–0	3–1	3–0	3–0	2–2
Barakaldo	2–1	—	4–2	2–0	2–1	1–0	2–1	0–0	2–1	1–1	2–1	2–0	3–1	1–0	3–0	2–1	2–0	1–0	2–3	0–0
Calvo Sotelo	4–2	3–3	—	0–2	0–0	1–1	2–1	2–0	3–1	2–1	2–4	3–2	2–1	1–2	3–1	1–2	1–1	1–1	0–0	1–2
Castellón	0–0	3–2	1–0	—	1–2	2–0	0–0	0–0	0–0	1–0	1–1	1–1	1–0	3–0	0–0	2–0	3–1	0–0	0–0	2–2
Celta	4–1	1–1	3–1	1–0	—	0–0	1–0	2–0	2–0	0–0	3–0	0–2	1–1	3–0	1–1	1–0	2–0	4–0	2–0	0–0
Córdoba	1–0	0–0	5–0	3–2	1–1	—	1–1	2–2	1–1	0–0	0–1	2–1	0–0	0–0	0–1	1–1	2–0	3–0	2–1	2–1
Deportivo	1–1	1–1	5–1	3–1	1–2	6–1	—	2–0	3–1	1–1	2–0	5–1	1–0	2–0	2–0	3–1	2–2	1–3	1–1	1–1
Getafe	1–1	2–0	2–0	0–1	0–0	0–0	2–0	—	0–4	1–0	1–0	4–0	1–0	2–1	1–1	2–1	0–1	2–2	1–0	1–1
Granada	2–0	1–0	2–0	1–0	1–1	2–1	2–1	0–1	—	1–1	1–0	2–1	2–0	3–2	2–1	1–1	1–0	3–0	4–1	1–3
Jaén	2–2	4–0	1–0	2–0	2–2	1–1	2–2	2–0	1–0	—	2–1	0–0	0–0	2–1	1–2	2–1	0–1	1–1	0–0	1–1
Málaga	1–1	1–1	5–0	0–0	2–1	3–1	0–0	2–0	2–2	1–1	—	2–0	1–1	2–0	1–0	0–1	1–0	2–0	0–0	3–0
Murcia	0–0	3–1	1–1	2–1	1–1	2–0	2–1	1–0	0–0	2–1	4–0	—	5–1	1–2	1–1	2–1	6–0	1–0	3–1	4–2
Osasuna	2–2	6–2	2–0	3–0	1–0	3–0	1–2	3–2	3–2	4–0	2–1	3–0	—	1–1	1–1	2–1	3–0	0–0	3–2	3–1
Oviedo	1–0	1–2	1–1	1–1	0–0	3–1	1–1	5–0	1–0	0–0	1–0	0–1	3–0	—	0–2	0–3	1–0	3–0	3–0	3–0
Recreativo	2–0	1–1	0–0	2–0	3–2	1–0	4–1	3–1	2–1	2–0	1–1	3–1	3–1	1–1	—	1–0	4–0	2–0	2–0	2–0
Sabadell	2–2	2–1	3–2	2–1	2–1	1–0	4–3	1–0	1–0	2–1	0–1	1–1	0–0	0–0	1–0	—	0–0	4–3	4–3	1–0
Tenerife	1–1	0–0	2–0	0–0	1–2	0–0	0–4	0–1	2–0	1–2	3–0	1–2	4–1	2–0	1–0	2–1	—	2–0	2–0	1–1
Terrassa	2–0	2–1	3–0	1–1	2–2	2–1	0–0	3–1	2–0	1–1	3–0	4–2	1–0	0–0	1–1	2–0	2–1	—	3–1	1–2
Valladolid	2–0	3–1	3–2	1–1	1–1	2–2	2–1	2–0	3–0	1–0	0–0	2–1	1–0	0–0	1–0	2–0	0–0	1–0	—	4–1
Zaragoza	1–0	4–0	2–1	3–2	2–0	2–2	2–0	0–0	2–1	3–1	3–1	2–1	1–0	3–2	2–0	5–0	4–1	4–1	3–0	—

Source: BDFutbol
Legend: Blue = home team win; Yellow = draw; Red = away team win.

== Pichichi Trophy for top goalscorers ==
Goalscorers	Goals	Team
(Spain) Alfonso Castro	24	Deportivo de La Coruña
(Spain) Pichi Alonso	22	Zaragoza
(Spain) José Luis	17	Granada
