= 1981–82 Segunda División =

51st season of the second-tier football league in Spain

Segunda División
- Season: 1981–82
- Dates: 20 September 1981 – 23 May 1982
- Champions: Celta Vigo (2nd title)
- Promoted: Salamanca; Málaga
- Relegated: Burgos; Almería; Levante; Getafe Deportivo
- Matches: 380
- Goals: 955 (2.51 per match)
- Top goalscorer: Pichi Lucas (26 goals)

The 1981–82 Segunda División season saw 20 teams participate in the second flight Spanish league. Celta de Vigo, UD Salamanca and CD Málaga were promoted to Primera División. Burgos, AD Almería, Levante UD and Getafe Deportivo were relegated to Segunda División B.

Location of teams in Segunda División 1981-82

== Team changes ==
=== To 1981–82 Segunda División ===
Promoted from 1980–81 Segunda División B

- Celta Vigo (Group 1 winners)
- Deportivo La Coruña (Group 1 runners-up)
- Mallorca (Group 2 winners)
- Córdoba (Group 2 runners-up)

Relegated from 1980–81 La Liga

- Murcia (16th)
- Salamanca (17th)
- Almería (18th)

=== From 1980–81 Segunda División ===
Relegated to 1981–82 Segunda División B

- Granada (17th)
- Palencia (18th)
- Barakaldo (19th)
- AgD Ceuta (20th)

Promoted to 1981–82 La Liga

- Castellón (winners)
- Cádiz (runners-up)
- Racing Santander (3rd)

== Locations and managers ==
Club	Town	Stadium	Manager
Alavés	Vitoria	Mendizorrotza	(Spain) José María García de Andoin
Almería	Almería	Juan Rojas	(Spain) Pachín
Atlético Madrileño	Madrid		(Spain) Joaquín Peiró
Burgos	Burgos	El Plantío	(Spain) Luis María Astorga
Castilla	Madrid		(Spain) Juan Santisteban
Celta Vigo	Vigo	Balaídos	(Socialist Federal Republic of Yugoslavia) Milorad Pavić
Córdoba	Córdoba	El Arcángel	(Socialist Federal Republic of Yugoslavia) Zdravko Rajkov
Deportivo La Coruña	A Coruña	Riazor	(Spain) Luis Rodríguez Vaz
Elche	Elche	Martínez Valero	(Argentina) Felipe Mesones
Getafe Deportivo	Getafe	Las Margaritas	(Spain) Máximo Hernández
Levante	Valencia	Ciutat de València	(Spain) Roberto Gil
Linares	Linares	Linarejos	(Spain) Nando Yosu
Málaga	Málaga	La Rosaleda	(Spain) Antonio Fernández Benítez
Mallorca	Palma de Mallorca	Lluís Sitjar	(France) Lucien Muller
Murcia	Murcia	La Condomina	(Spain) Eusebio Ríos
Oviedo	Oviedo	Carlos Tartiere	(Spain) José María
Rayo Vallecano	Madrid	Vallecas	(Spain) Manuel Peñalva Usanos
Recreativo Huelva	Huelva	Colombino	(Spain) Jesús Aranguren
Sabadell	Sabadell	Nova Creu Alta	(Spain) Manuel Polinario
Salamanca	Salamanca	Helmántico	(Spain) Manolo Villanova

== League table ==
Pos	Team	Pld	W	D	L	GF	GA	GD	Pts	Promotion or relegation
1	Celta de Vigo	38	22	9	7	79	40	+39	53	Promoted to Primera División
2	UD Salamanca	38	23	5	10	70	33	+37	51	Promoted to Primera División
3	CD Málaga	38	20	10	8	70	35	+35	50	Promoted to Primera División
4	Elche CF	38	19	12	7	55	31	+24	50	
5	Real Murcia	38	18	10	10	54	38	+16	46	
6	RCD Mallorca	38	15	12	11	55	46	+9	42	
7	Rayo Vallecano	38	16	9	13	45	44	+1	41	
8	Castilla CF	38	13	14	11	48	48	0	40	
9	Burgos (Note: Burgos was relegated to Segunda División B for not paying its players. Then, Deportivo Alavés was readmitted in Segunda División.)	38	15	10	13	46	41	+5	40	Relegated to Segunda Divisiόn B
10	Atlético Madrileño	38	12	14	12	44	44	0	38	
11	CE Sabadell FC	38	14	10	14	59	63	−4	38	
12	Deportivo de La Coruña	38	13	11	14	40	48	−8	37	
13	Córdoba CF	38	11	14	13	45	49	−4	36	
14	Recreativo de Huelva	38	12	11	15	39	40	−1	35	
15	Linares CF	38	10	14	14	42	57	−15	34	
16	Real Oviedo	38	9	13	16	34	53	−19	31	
17	Deportivo Alavés	38	11	7	20	38	52	−14	29	
18	AD Almería (Note: AD Almería, Levante UD and Getafe Deportivo were relegated to Tercera División for not paying their players.)	38	6	18	14	27	43	−16	26 (Note: AD Almería had 4 points deducted for fielding ineligible players against Deportivo de La Coruña and RCD Mallorca.)	Relegated to Segunda Divisiόn B
19	Levante UD	38	7	6	25	26	74	−48	20	Relegated to Segunda Divisiόn B
20	Getafe Deportivo	38	5	9	24	39	76	−37	19	Relegated to Segunda Divisiόn B

Source: BDFutbol

== Results ==
Home \ Away	ALV	ALM	ATM	BUR	CST	CEL	CÓR	DEP	ELC	GET	LEV	LIN	MGA	MLL	MUR	OVI	RAY	REC	SAB	SAL
Alavés	—	1–1	0–0	0–1	2–1	0–1	5–1	1–0	1–1	1–1	3–0	2–0	2–0	3–0	1–2	1–0	3–0	1–0	3–2	1–2
Almería	1–1	—	0–0	0–0	1–0	4–0	2–1	0–0	0–1	1–3	2–0	3–1	0–0	1–2	0–0	1–1	0–0	0–0	1–2	1–1
At. Madrileño	1–0	0–0	—	3–3	0–0	1–0	1–1	2–2	1–1	3–1	1–0	0–0	0–2	4–2	0–2	0–0	3–0	3–0	2–0	3–3
Burgos	2–0	0–0	0–1	—	1–1	1–1	3–1	1–0	0–1	1–0	5–0	2–2	2–0	2–1	0–1	3–0	1–0	1–0	2–1	2–3
Castilla	2–0	4–1	1–0	2–1	—	4–1	1–1	1–2	2–1	2–1	3–1	1–2	2–2	2–2	2–2	2–1	0–1	0–0	2–2	2–0
Celta	1–0	2–1	2–0	0–0	1–2	—	3–1	1–0	1–0	6–0	5–1	5–1	2–0	4–0	4–1	3–2	3–1	4–1	2–2	0–3
Córdoba	1–0	4–0	2–2	1–0	1–1	1–1	—	2–2	1–1	3–0	4–0	0–0	1–1	3–1	2–1	2–0	1–1	1–1	0–1	1–0
Deportivo	4–1	0–0	1–0	2–1	0–1	1–1	1–1	—	0–3	2–0	1–0	3–0	0–2	1–1	2–1	1–1	1–2	3–0	3–1	1–0
Elche	3–0	0–1	2–2	3–1	2–0	2–1	2–1	2–0	—	2–0	3–0	2–0	1–1	1–0	1–1	1–0	0–3	1–0	4–2	1–1
Getafe	2–0	1–1	2–4	1–2	2–0	0–2	0–1	2–3	0–1	—	2–1	1–2	2–3	1–2	0–2	2–2	3–0	2–2	3–4	0–1
Levante	1–1	1–0	1–1	0–1	0–1	1–1	1–0	2–0	1–6	2–0	—	0–1	2–3	0–2	3–1	0–1	1–1	1–0	1–0	0–1
Linares	1–0	2–2	2–0	3–1	1–1	0–5	0–1	0–0	0–0	3–1	1–1	—	2–2	3–1	2–1	1–1	0–1	1–1	3–3	1–2
Málaga	3–1	2–0	1–2	1–0	1–1	0–0	1–1	8–0	1–1	2–2	3–1	2–0	—	1–0	2–0	3–1	5–0	5–1	3–0	2–0
Mallorca	4–1	2–0	1–0	0–0	1–1	2–2	3–0	1–1	2–0	1–1	3–0	2–1	2–1	—	1–1	4–1	1–0	1–1	5–1	1–0
Murcia	2–1	3–0	2–0	1–2	3–0	0–2	1–0	2–1	1–1	3–0	2–1	1–1	1–0	1–1	—	3–0	1–2	1–1	4–1	1–0
Oviedo	1–0	2–1	3–0	1–1	1–1	1–5	1–0	0–2	1–1	1–1	2–1	2–1	1–2	1–1	1–1	—	1–0	0–1	1–1	0–2
Rayo	1–1	2–0	1–0	2–0	2–1	3–1	1–1	1–0	2–0	1–1	3–0	4–1	1–3	2–1	0–0	0–0	—	0–1	2–2	4–2
Recreativo	4–0	0–0	0–1	3–0	1–1	0–0	2–1	2–0	2–1	5–0	3–0	0–1	0–1	0–0	1–2	0–1	2–0	—	1–0	2–1
Sabadell	1–0	0–0	4–2	5–3	3–0	3–5	4–1	0–0	0–1	1–1	1–1	1–1	1–0	2–1	1–2	2–1	1–0	2–0	—	1–0
Salamanca	4–0	4–1	2–1	0–0	4–0	0–1	4–0	4–0	1–1	3–0	6–0	2–1	2–1	2–0	1–0	2–0	2–1	3–1	2–1	—

Source: BDFutbol
Legend: Blue = home team win; Yellow = draw; Red = away team win.

== Top goalscorers ==
Rank	Player	Club	Goals
1	(Spain) Pichi Lucas	Celta Vigo	26
2	(Spain) Jesús Orejuela	Salamanca	24
3	(Spain) Del Cura	Celta Vigo	15
3	(Spain) Nene Suárez	Celta Vigo	15
5	(Socialist Federal Republic of Yugoslavia) Miloš Kostić	Elche	13
5	(Spain) Nando	Elche	13
5	(Brazil) Guina	Murcia	13
5	(Spain) Antonio López Habas	Burgos	13
5	(Spain) José Manuel Traba	Deportivo La Coruña	13
10	(Spain) Francisco Aguilar	Rayo Vallecano	12
10	(Spain) Paco Machín	Castilla	12
10	(Spain) José Luis Munárriz Clemos	Córdoba	12
10	(Socialist Federal Republic of Yugoslavia) Stjepan Milardović	Linares	12
