= Sporting de Gijón league record by opponent =

Sporting de Gijón is a Spanish professional association football club, based in Gijón, Asturias. The club was formed on 1 July 1905.

Sporting de Gijón started playing the Regional Championship of Asturias until La Liga was created in 1929. The club played its first league season in Segunda División. The club promoted to the top tier for the first time in 1944.

To date Sporting de Gijón has competed 42 seasons in La Liga and 42 in Segunda División, never being relegated to lower divisions.

== Key ==
- The records only include the results of all La Liga matches played in the club's history, not including playoffs games.
- All teams are listed under the names against which they originally played Sporting de Gijón in the league, if they have subsequently changed their name then this will be.
- † Teams with this background and symbol in the "Club" column are competing in 2017–18 Segunda División alongside Sporting de Gijón.
- ‡ Teams with this background and symbol in the "Club" column are now defunct or have had a subsequent change of name since they last played a league match against Sporting de Gijón.
- P = matches played; W = matches won; D = matches drawn; L = matches lost; GF = Goals scored; GA = Goals conceded; Win% = percentage of total league matches won

== All-time league record ==
Statistics correct as of matches played on 20 May 2017.

Sporting de Gijón La Liga record by opponent
Club	P	W	D	L	P	W	D	L	P	W	D	L	GF	GA	GD	Win %	First Match	Latest Match
Club	Home				Away				Total							Win %	First Match	Latest Match
Alavés	1	0	0	1	1	0	1	0	2	0	1	1	2	4	–2	.000	28 August 2016	5 February 2017
Albacete †	5	4	0	1	5	3	0	2	10	7	0	3	18	15	+3	.700	3 November 1991	21 January 1996
Alcoyano	2	0	2	0	2	0	0	2	4	0	2	2	4	12	–8	.000	18 November 1945	1 February 1948
AD Almería ‡	2	2	0	0	2	0	2	0	4	2	2	0	7	3	+4	.500	4 November 1979	22 February 1981
UD Almería †	3	3	0	0	3	0	1	2	6	3	1	2	6	7	–1	.500	21 December 2008	20 March 2011
Athletic Bilbao	42	12	15	15	42	8	8	26	84	20	23	41	93	155	–62	.238	15 October 1944	29 January 2017
Atlético Madrid	42	17	9	16	42	3	12	27	84	20	21	43	106	160	–54	.238	29 October 1944	18 February 2017
Atlético Tetuán ‡	1	1	0	0	1	0	0	1	2	1	0	1	4	4	0	.500	9 December 1951	6 April 1952
Barcelona	43	16	12	15	43	1	4	38	86	17	16	53	72	189	–117	.198	5 November 1944	1 March 2017
Betis	25	13	7	5	25	4	5	16	50	17	12	21	48	70	–22	.340	19 October 1958	20 May 2017
Burgos ‡	5	3	1	1	5	2	1	2	10	5	2	3	15	7	+8	.500	31 October 1971	11 May 1980
Cádiz †	11	10	1	0	11	3	4	4	22	13	5	4	37	21	+16	.591	8 January 1978	23 May 1993
Castellón	8	7	1	0	8	2	0	6	16	9	1	6	25	13	+12	.563	19 November 1944	31 March 1991
Celta	27	13	9	5	27	4	7	16	54	17	16	21	69	75	–6	.315	7 October 1945	26 February 2017
Compostela	4	1	2	1	4	0	0	4	8	1	2	5	7	13	–6	.125	27 November 1994	11 January 1998
Córdoba †	1	0	1	0	1	1	0	0	2	1	1	0	1	0	+1	.500	14 November 1971	19 March 1972
Deportivo La Coruña	19	7	6	6	19	2	6	11	38	9	12	17	49	62	–13	.237	1 October 1944	5 March 2017
Eibar	2	1	0	1	2	1	0	1	4	2	0	2	5	5	0	.500	30 December 2015	14 May 2017
Elche	7	6	1	0	7	1	2	4	14	7	3	4	16	12	+4	.500	27 September 1970	27 May 1989
Espanyol	41	21	9	11	41	7	11	23	82	28	20	34	98	104	–6	.341	24 September 1944	25 April 2017
Extremadura ‡	1	0	1	0	1	1	0	0	2	1	1	0	3	2	+1	.500	23 November 1996	20 April 1997
Getafe	5	3	0	2	5	0	2	3	10	3	2	5	10	17	–7	.300	31 August 2008	8 May 2016
Gimnàstic †	1	1	0	0	1	0	0	1	2	1	0	1	3	7	–4	.500	2 November 1947	8 February 1948
Granada †	12	9	2	1	12	0	3	9	24	9	5	9	35	30	+5	.391	12 November 1944	19 March 2017
Hércules	12	9	2	1	12	1	6	5	24	10	8	6	30	20	+10	.417	30 September 1945	21 May 2011
Jaén	2	2	0	0	2	0	0	2	4	2	0	2	5	9	–4	.500	25 October 1953	2 March 1958
Las Palmas	20	15	3	2	20	3	7	10	40	18	10	12	61	50	+11	.450	2 December 1951	6 May 2017
Leganés	1	1	0	0	1	1	0	0	2	2	0	0	4	1	+3	1.000	11 September 2016	12 February 2017
Levante	3	1	1	1	3	0	2	1	6	1	3	2	4	10	–6	.167	12 December 2010	4 April 2016
Lleida ‡	1	0	1	0	1	0	1	0	2	0	2	0	2	2	0	.000	17 October 1993	27 February 1994
Logroñés ‡	9	5	3	1	9	5	1	3	18	10	4	4	28	14	+14	.556	13 December 1987	9 March 1997
CD Málaga ‡	12	7	1	4	12	2	3	7	24	9	4	11	29	25	+4	.375	14 September 1952	4 February 1990
Málaga CF	6	3	1	2	6	0	1	5	12	3	2	7	11	16	–5	.391	4 January 2009	5 April 2017
Mallorca	13	5	4	4	13	5	4	4	26	10	8	8	34	35	–1	.385	6 November 1983	21 March 2012
Mérida ‡	2	1	1	0	2	0	0	2	4	1	1	2	3	3	0	.250	5 November 1995	22 March 1998
Murcia	11	7	2	2	11	2	2	7	22	9	4	9	36	27	+9	.409	3 December 1944	12 March 1989
Numancia †	1	1	0	0	1	0	0	1	2	1	0	1	4	3	+1	.500	2 November 2008	22 March 2009
Osasuna †	22	15	4	3	22	5	5	12	44	20	9	15	63	53	+10	.455	13 December 1953	22 April 2017
Oviedo †	20	6	8	6	20	2	5	13	40	8	13	19	31	42	–11	.276	10 February 1944	15 March 1998
Racing Santander	21	12	2	7	21	5	5	11	42	17	7	18	50	53	–3	.405	18 November 1951	25 February 2012
Rayo Vallecano †	10	8	2	0	10	4	1	5	20	12	3	5	32	21	+11	.600	13 November 1977	12 February 2016
Real Burgos	3	0	3	0	3	1	1	1	6	1	4	1	3	3	0	.167	7 October 1990	7 March 1993
Real Madrid	43	10	14	19	43	3	10	30	86	13	24	49	73	161	–88	.153	17 December 1944	15 April 2017
Real Sociedad	37	17	7	13	37	6	11	20	74	23	18	33	91	105	–14	.315	30 November 1947	10 April 2017
Recreativo	2	2	0	0	2	0	1	1	4	2	1	1	5	4	+1	.500	7 January 1979	31 May 2009
Sabadell	7	6	0	1	7	1	3	3	14	7	3	4	23	18	+5	.500	26 November 1944	3 April 1988
Salamanca ‡	10	6	3	1	10	4	2	4	20	10	5	5	25	19	+6	.500	10 November 1974	26 April 1998
Sevilla	38	24	6	8	38	4	7	27	76	28	13	35	92	117	–25	.368	22 October 1944	2 April 2017
Tenerife †	10	3	2	5	10	1	3	6	20	4	5	11	14	34	–20	.200	17 December 1989	13 April 2010
Valencia	41	16	12	13	41	5	11	25	82	21	23	38	86	134	–48	.256	8 October 1944	11 March 2017
Valladolid †	23	13	4	6	23	7	4	12	46	20	8	18	65	61	+4	.435	30 September 1951	25 April 2010
Villarreal	6	2	1	3	6	0	1	5	12	2	2	8	10	20	–10	.167	27 September 2008	28 April 2017
Xerez	1	0	1	0	1	0	1	0	2	0	2	0	2	2	0	.000	22 November 2009	4 April 2010
Zaragoza †	34	11	12	11	34	3	16	15	68	14	28	26	81	107	–26	.206	28 October 1951	31 March 2012

== Overall record ==
Statistics correct as of the end of the 2019–20 season.

Sporting de Gijón overall league record by competition
Competition	P	W	D	L	P	W	D	L	P	W	D	L	GF	GA	GD	Win%
Competition	Home				Away				Total							Win%
La Liga	710	353	173	184	710	111	175	424	1,420	464	348	608	1,711	2,080	–369	.327
Segunda División	734	473	159	102	733	199	197	337	1,467	672	356	439	2,456	1,775	+681	.458
Total	1,444	826	332	286	1,443	310	372	761	2,808	1,105	679	1,018	4,080	3,778	+302	.394
