= 1978–79 Segunda División B =

Season of third division football in Spain

The 1978–79 Segunda División B was the 2nd season of Segunda División B, the third highest level of the Spanish football league system, since its establishment in 1977. First and 2nd in each group were promoted to Segunda División, and the bottom three were relegated to the Tercera División.

The division consisted of two geographic groups. Palencia CF were the Group I champions and Levante UD were the Group II champions.

== Group 1 ==
Segunda División B (group 1)
- Season: 1978–79
- Champions: Palencia CF
- Promoted: Palencia CF; Real Oviedo
- Relegated: Real Unión (resign); CD Lugo; CD Pegaso; Caudal Deportivo
- Matches: 380
- Goals: 904 (2.38 per match)
- Biggest home win: Logroñés 6–0 Pegaso (18 March 1979)
- Biggest away win: Lugo 0–4 Logroñés (25 February 1979)
- Highest scoring: Madrileño 6–1 Palencia (24 September 1978); Palencia 6–1 Huesca (29 April 1979); Torrejón 5–2 Pontevedra (6 May 1979)

A total of 20 teams will contest the group, including 2 relegated from the Segunda División and 3 promoted from the Tercera División.

=== Promotion and relegation ===
Teams relegated from 1977–78 Segunda División

- Real Oviedo
- CD Tenerife

Teams promoted from 1977–78 Tercera División

- Zamora CF
- CD Logroñés
- CD Lugo

=== Teams ===
Teams from Aragon, Asturias, Basque Provinces, Canary Islands, Galicia, León, New Castile and Old Castile.

Locations of the Segunda División B (group 1) 1978-79 teams

| Team | Founded | Home city | Stadium |
|---|---|---|---|
| Atlético Madrileño | 1969 | Madrid, New Castile | Vicente Calderón |
| Bilbao Athletic | 1964 | Bilbao, Basque Provinces | Lezama |
| Caudal | 1918 | Mieres, Asturias | Hermanos Antuña |
| Cultural Leonesa | 1923 | León, León | Antonio Amilivia |
| Ensidesa | 1956 | Avilés, Asturias | Muro de Zaro |
| Huesca | 1960 | Huesca, Aragon | El Alcoraz |
| Langreo | 1961 | Langreo, Asturias | Ganzábal |
| Logroñés | 1940 | Logroño, Old Castile | Las Gaunas |
| Lugo | 1953 | Lugo, Galicia | Ángel Carro |
| Mirandés | 1927 | Miranda de Ebro, Old Castile | Anduva |
| Orense | 1952 | Ourense, Galicia | O Couto |
| Oviedo | 1926 | Oviedo, Asturias | Carlos Tartiere |
| Palencia | 1968 | Palencia, Old Castile | La Balastera |
| Pegaso | 1962 | Tres Cantos, New Castile | La Foresta |
| Pontevedra | 1941 | Pontevedra, Galicia | Pasarón |
| Real Unión | 1915 | Irun, Basque Provinces | Stadium Gal |
| Sestao | 1916 | Sestao, Basque Provinces | Las Llanas |
| Tenerife | 1912 | Tenerife, Canary Islands | Heliodoro Rodríguez López |
| Torrejón | 1953 | Torrejón de Ardoz, New Castile | Las Veredillas |
| Zamora | 1968 | Zamora, León | Ramiro Ledesma |

=== League table ===
| Pos | Team | Pld | W | D | L | GF | GA | GD | Pts | Promotion or relegation |
|---|---|---|---|---|---|---|---|---|---|---|
| 1 | Palencia CF (C, P) | 38 | 19 | 14 | 5 | 54 | 33 | +21 | 52 | Promotion to Segunda División |
| 2 | Oviedo (P) | 38 | 22 | 6 | 10 | 65 | 37 | +28 | 50 | Promotion to Segunda División |
| 3 | CD Mirandés | 38 | 22 | 5 | 11 | 51 | 37 | +14 | 49 | |
| 4 | AD Torrejón | 38 | 23 | 2 | 13 | 63 | 45 | +18 | 48 | |
| 5 | Cultural Leonesa | 38 | 18 | 10 | 10 | 55 | 35 | +20 | 46 | |
| 6 | CD Tenerife | 38 | 19 | 6 | 13 | 51 | 42 | +9 | 44 | |
| 7 | Bilbao Athletic | 38 | 18 | 6 | 14 | 46 | 41 | +5 | 42 | |
| 8 | CD Orense | 38 | 16 | 8 | 14 | 35 | 35 | 0 | 40 | |
| 9 | Zamora | 38 | 14 | 11 | 13 | 41 | 38 | +3 | 39 | |
| 10 | Atlético Madrileño | 38 | 16 | 6 | 16 | 51 | 50 | +1 | 38 | |
| 11 | CD Logroñés | 38 | 12 | 14 | 12 | 53 | 45 | +8 | 38 | |
| 12 | Sestao Sport | 38 | 15 | 8 | 15 | 47 | 38 | +9 | 38 | |
| 13 | SD Huesca | 38 | 13 | 11 | 14 | 42 | 44 | −2 | 37 | |
| 14 | UP Langreo | 38 | 13 | 10 | 15 | 42 | 46 | −4 | 36 | |
| 15 | CD Ensidesa | 38 | 14 | 6 | 18 | 38 | 49 | −11 | 34 | |
| 16 | Pontevedra | 38 | 13 | 7 | 18 | 37 | 45 | −8 | 33 | |
| 17 | Real Unión (R) | 38 | 10 | 10 | 18 | 36 | 55 | −19 | 30 | Resign |
| 18 | CD Lugo (R) | 38 | 10 | 7 | 21 | 31 | 51 | −20 | 27 | Relegation to Tercera División |
| 19 | CD Pegaso (R) | 38 | 9 | 5 | 24 | 35 | 66 | −31 | 23 | Relegation to Tercera División |
| 20 | Caudal (R) | 38 | 6 | 4 | 28 | 31 | 72 | −41 | 16 | Relegation to Tercera División |

Source: arquero-arba
Rules for classification: 1st points; 2nd head-to-head points; 3rd head-to-head goal difference; 4th head-to-head goals scored; 5th goal difference; 6th number of goals scored
(C) Champions; (P) Promoted; (R) Relegated

=== Results ===
| Home \ Away | PAL | ROV | MIR | TOR | CLE | TEN | BAT | ORE | ZAM | MAD | LOG | SES | SDH | LAN | ENS | PON | RUN | LUG | PEG | CAU |
|---|---|---|---|---|---|---|---|---|---|---|---|---|---|---|---|---|---|---|---|---|
| Palencia CF | | 1–1 | 2–2 | 1–0 | 1–0 | 5–0 | 1–0 | 1–0 | 3–0 | 4–1 | 1–0 | 2–1 | 6–1 | 1–0 | 2–1 | 1–0 | 0–0 | 1–0 | 3–0 | 4–0 |
| Oviedo | 1–1 | | 2–2 | 4–2 | 1–0 | 3–0 | 0–2 | 0–1 | 1–1 | 0–1 | 4–0 | 1–0 | 1–0 | 3–0 | 3–2 | 2–0 | 3–0 | 3–1 | 1–0 | 2–0 |
| CD Mirandés | 2–0 | 2–1 | | 1–0 | 1–0 | 1–1 | 2–1 | 1–0 | 1–0 | 2–0 | 2–1 | 1–0 | 2–1 | 1–2 | 1–0 | 5–0 | 3–0 | 1–0 | 2–0 | 4–1 |
| AD Torrejón | 3–0 | 1–2 | 3–1 | | 2–0 | 2–0 | 2–0 | 2–0 | 1–0 | 2–0 | 5–0 | 2–0 | 1–0 | 0–2 | 2–0 | 5–2 | 3–2 | 1–0 | 4–2 | 3–2 |
| Cultural Leonesa | 2–2 | 3–1 | 2–0 | 0–1 | | 2–1 | 3–0 | 4–0 | 1–1 | 3–2 | 4–2 | 0–0 | 2–0 | 0–0 | 0–0 | 2–0 | 3–0 | 2–0 | 3–2 | 2–1 |
| CD Tenerife | 2–0 | 1–2 | 2–1 | 4–1 | 1–0 | | 2–0 | 2–0 | 0–1 | 2–2 | 2–1 | 1–0 | 2–0 | 1–1 | 3–0 | 2–0 | 2–0 | 3–0 | 2–0 | 2–1 |
| Bilbao Athletic | 0–1 | 1–0 | 1–0 | 3–1 | 1–2 | 2–0 | | 3–0 | 1–1 | 4–0 | 2–1 | 2–1 | 1–1 | 0–0 | 3–1 | 2–1 | 3–0 | 1–0 | 2–0 | 3–0 |
| CD Orense | 1–1 | 0–1 | 1–0 | 3–0 | 1–0 | 0–0 | 2–0 | | 1–0 | 2–0 | 2–0 | 1–1 | 1–0 | 1–1 | 4–1 | 1–0 | 2–0 | 2–4 | 1–0 | 1–0 |
| Zamora | 0–1 | 1–1 | 3–1 | 4–1 | 2–2 | 0–2 | 0–0 | 0–1 | | 0–1 | 2–1 | 2–1 | 2–0 | 3–1 | 3–2 | 1–0 | 1–0 | 2–0 | 2–0 | 2–1 |
| Atlético Madrileño | 6–1 | 1–3 | 1–3 | 1–0 | 2–1 | 2–0 | 5–1 | 3–0 | 0–0 | | 2–1 | 2–1 | 2–2 | 4–0 | 1–2 | 1–0 | 1–1 | 3–0 | 1–0 | 2–0 |
| CD Logroñés | 1–1 | 3–1 | 0–0 | 0–0 | 0–0 | 0–0 | 2–2 | 2–1 | 1–0 | 1–0 | | 4–1 | 2–2 | 3–0 | 1–0 | 2–0 | 1–1 | 1–1 | 6–0 | 5–0 |
| Sestao Sport | 3–0 | 2–1 | 1–1 | 2–0 | 1–2 | 2–1 | 2–0 | 2–1 | 1–1 | 0–1 | 1–0 | | 1–1 | 2–1 | 0–2 | 0–1 | 4–0 | 1–0 | 4–0 | 3–0 |
| SD Huesca | 0–0 | 1–0 | 3–0 | 2–1 | 1–3 | 0–2 | 1–1 | 0–0 | 1–0 | 3–0 | 1–1 | 0–1 | | 1–0 | 2–0 | 2–0 | 2–1 | 1–0 | 5–0 | 1–0 |
| UP Langreo | 1–1 | 1–1 | 1–2 | 0–2 | 4–1 | 3–2 | 0–1 | 0–0 | 2–2 | 3–1 | 1–1 | 1–2 | 1–1 | | 2–0 | 1–0 | 2–0 | 0–1 | 2–1 | 2–1 |
| CD Ensidesa | 1–1 | 2–1 | 1–0 | 1–2 | 0–2 | 1–0 | 1–0 | 1–1 | 1–1 | 1–0 | 1–2 | 2–1 | 1–1 | 3–2 | | 0–0 | 2–1 | 2–0 | 1–0 | 1–0 |
| Pontevedra | 0–0 | 2–3 | 3–0 | 2–0 | 3–2 | 1–1 | 1–0 | 0–0 | 3–0 | 1–0 | 2–0 | 0–0 | 1–2 | 1–0 | 2–0 | | 3–3 | 2–0 | 2–1 | 2–0 |
| Real Unión | 0–0 | 0–2 | 3–0 | 0–1 | 1–1 | 1–2 | 3–1 | 3–1 | 1–1 | 0–0 | 1–1 | 0–2 | 4–1 | 0–2 | 2–1 | 1–0 | | 2–1 | 1–0 | 2–0 |
| CD Lugo | 1–1 | 1–3 | 0–1 | 2–3 | 0–0 | 3–1 | 0–1 | 1–0 | 1–0 | 2–1 | 0–4 | 0–0 | 0–0 | 1–2 | 1–0 | 1–1 | 3–1 | | 1–1 | 4–1 |
| CD Pegaso | 2–2 | 0–3 | 0–1 | 1–3 | 0–1 | 0–2 | 4–0 | 0–2 | 2–1 | 3–0 | 0–0 | 2–2 | 2–1 | 0–1 | 1–0 | 1–0 | 0–0 | 2–0 | | 4–2 |
| Caudal | 0–1 | 1–3 | 0–1 | 1–1 | 0–0 | 4–0 | 0–1 | 1–0 | 0–1 | 1–1 | 2–2 | 2–1 | 2–1 | 1–0 | 1–3 | 3–1 | 0–1 | 0–1 | 2–4 | |

Source: arquero-arba
Legend: Blue = home team win; Yellow = draw; Red = away team win.

=== Top goalscorers ===
| Goalscorers | Goals | Team |
|---|---|---|
| (Spain) Luis María Muñoz | 21 | CD Logroñés |
| (Spain) Esteban Martínez | 18 | AD Torrejón |
| (Spain) Cesáreo Parajón | 14 | Real Oviedo |
| (Spain) José Luis Urrecho | 14 | CD Mirandés |
| (Spain) Pedro Morales | 14 | AD Torrejón |

=== Top goalkeepers ===
| Goalkeeper | Goals | Matches | Average | Team |
|---|---|---|---|---|
| (Spain) José Francisco Díez | 24 | 34 | 0.71 | Palencia CF |
| (Spain) José Muñoz | 21 | 25 | 0.84 | CD Mirandés |
| (Spain) Esteban Folgueral | 29 | 34 | 0.85 | Cultural Leonesa |
| (Spain) Francisco Buyo | 19 | 22 | 0.86 | SD Huesca |
| (Spain) Camuel | 34 | 36 | 0.94 | Real Oviedo |

== Group 2 ==
Segunda División B (group 2)
- Season: 1978–79
- Champions: Levante UD
- Promoted: Levante UD; Gimnástico de Tarragona
- Relegated: CP Cacereño; Vinaroz CF; CD Olímpico
- Matches: 380
- Goals: 977 (2.57 per match)
- Biggest home win: Levante 8-0 Olímpico (6 May 1979)
- Biggest away win: Onteniente 1-5 Barcelona (10 June 1979); Córdoba 0-4 Diter Zafra (6 May 1979)
- Highest scoring: Onteniente 7-2 Olímpico (3 December 1978)

A total of 20 teams will contest the group, including 3 relegated from the Segunda División and 17 promoted from the Tercera División.

=== Promotion and relegation ===
Teams relegated from 1977–78 Segunda División

- CF Calvo Sotelo
- Córdoba CF

Teams promoted from 1977–78 Tercera División

- Gimnástico de Tarragona
- SD Ibiza
- CP Cacereño

=== Teams ===
Teams from Andalusia, Balearic Islands, Catalonia, Extremadura, New Castile and Valencia.

Locations of the Segunda División B (group 2) 1978-79 teams

| Team | Founded | Home city | Stadium |
|---|---|---|---|
| Badajoz | 1905 | Badajoz, Extremadura | Vivero |
| Barcelona Atlético | 1970 | Barcelona, Catalonia | Fabra i Coats |
| Cacereño | 1919 | Cáceres, Extremadura | Príncipe Felipe |
| Calvo Sotelo | 1948 | Puertollano, Castilla–La Mancha | Calvo Sotelo |
| Ceuta | 1970 | Ceuta | Alfonso Murube |
| Córdoba | 1954 | Córdoba, Andalusia | El Árcangel |
| Díter Zafra | 1930 | Zafra, Extremadura | Nuevo Estadio de Zafra |
| Eldense | 1921 | Elda, Valencia | Pepico Amat |
| Gerona | 1930 | Girona, Catalonia | Montilivi |
| Gimnástico de Tarragona | 1886 | Tarragona, Catalonia | José Luis Calderón |
| Ibiza | 1956 | Ibiza, Balearic Islands | Carrer Canàries |
| Levante | 1909 | Valencia, Valencia | Nuevo Estadio Levante |
| Linares | 1961 | Linares, Andalusia | Linarejos |
| Lleida | 1939 | Lleida, Catalonia | Camp d'Esports |
| Onteniente | 1947 | Ontinyent, Valencia | El Clariano |
| Portuense | 1928 | El Puerto de Santa María, Andalusia | José del Cuvillo |
| San Andrés | 1909 | Barcelona, Catalonia | Calle Santa Coloma |
| Sevilla Atlético | 1950 | Seville, Andalusia | Ciudad Deportiva José Ramón Cisneros Palacios |
| Vinaroz | 1965 | Vinaròs, Valencia | Campo Maestrat |
| Xerez | 1947 | Jerez de la Frontera, Andalusia | Domecq |

=== League table ===
| Pos | Team | Pld | W | D | L | GF | GA | GD | Pts | Promotion or relegation |
|---|---|---|---|---|---|---|---|---|---|---|
| 1 | Levante UD (C, P) | 38 | 23 | 9 | 6 | 80 | 20 | +60 | 55 | Promotion to Segunda División |
| 2 | Gimnástico de Tarragona (P) | 38 | 18 | 16 | 4 | 42 | 22 | +20 | 52 | Promotion to Segunda División |
| 3 | AD Ceuta | 38 | 22 | 8 | 8 | 61 | 37 | +24 | 52 | |
| 4 | Barcelona Atlético | 38 | 19 | 11 | 8 | 68 | 42 | +26 | 49 | |
| 5 | CF Calvo Sotelo | 38 | 17 | 15 | 6 | 57 | 38 | +19 | 49 | |
| 6 | Sevilla Atlético | 38 | 14 | 14 | 10 | 48 | 39 | +9 | 42 | |
| 7 | Xerez CD | 39 | 15 | 11 | 13 | 48 | 40 | +8 | 41 | |
| 8 | CD San Andrés | 38 | 14 | 12 | 12 | 45 | 45 | 0 | 40 | |
| 9 | Linares CF | 38 | 14 | 12 | 12 | 36 | 46 | −10 | 40 | |
| 10 | Onteniente CF | 38 | 17 | 5 | 16 | 57 | 56 | +1 | 39 | |
| 11 | UE Lleida | 38 | 13 | 11 | 14 | 56 | 45 | +11 | 37 | |
| 12 | CD Diter Zafra | 38 | 9 | 15 | 14 | 39 | 40 | −1 | 33 | |
| 13 | Gerona CF | 38 | 12 | 9 | 17 | 52 | 58 | −6 | 33 | |
| 14 | SD Ibiza | 38 | 12 | 8 | 18 | 37 | 50 | −13 | 32 | |
| 15 | Racing Portuense | 38 | 13 | 6 | 19 | 38 | 53 | −15 | 32 | |
| 16 | CD Badajoz | 38 | 14 | 3 | 21 | 42 | 53 | −11 | 31 | |
| 17 | Córdoba CF | 38 | 8 | 15 | 15 | 41 | 53 | −12 | 31 | |
| 18 | CP Cacereño (R) | 38 | 12 | 6 | 20 | 39 | 58 | −19 | 30 | Relegation to Tercera División |
| 19 | Vinaroz CF (R) | 38 | 12 | 6 | 20 | 53 | 73 | −20 | 30 | Relegation to Tercera División |
| 20 | CD Olímpico (R) | 38 | 4 | 4 | 30 | 38 | 109 | −71 | 12 | Relegation to Tercera División |

Source: arquero-arba
Rules for classification: 1st points; 2nd head-to-head points; 3rd head-to-head goal difference; 4th head-to-head goals scored; 5th goal difference; 6th number of goals scored
(C) Champions; (P) Promoted; (R) Relegated

=== Results ===
| Home \ Away | LEV | GTA | CEU | BAR | CSO | SAT | XER | SAN | LIN | ONT | LLE | DZA | GER | IBI | RPO | BAD | COR | CAC | VIN | OLI |
|---|---|---|---|---|---|---|---|---|---|---|---|---|---|---|---|---|---|---|---|---|
| Levante UD | | 1–2 | 4–0 | 1–0 | 2–3 | 2–1 | 1–0 | 4–0 | 5–0 | 3–0 | 3–0 | 1–0 | 1–1 | 1–0 | 4–0 | 6–0 | 4–0 | 3–0 | 4–0 | 8–0 |
| Gimnástico de Tarragona | 1–0 | | 1–1 | 1–2 | 1–1 | 0–0 | 0–0 | 5–1 | 0–0 | 1–0 | 2–1 | 0–0 | 2–1 | 2–0 | 2–0 | 0–0 | 2–1 | 2–0 | 1–0 | 2–0 |
| AD Ceuta | 1–0 | 0–0 | | 2–1 | 3–0 | 1–0 | 1–0 | 1–0 | 3–0 | 1–1 | 3–1 | 1–0 | 5–3 | 2–0 | 3–1 | 2–1 | 2–2 | 3–0 | 4–0 | 5–0 |
| Barcelona Atlético | 0–2 | 0–0 | 1–0 | | 2–2 | 1–1 | 2–1 | 2–1 | 3–1 | 4–1 | 1–1 | 2–0 | 0–0 | 2–1 | 2–1 | 2–0 | 1–1 | 0–1 | 7–1 | 3–1 |
| CF Calvo Sotelo | 1–0 | 2–1 | 5–0 | 0–0 | | 0–0 | 0–0 | 0–1 | 2–0 | 2–1 | 3–1 | 2–2 | 1–1 | 4–3 | 2–1 | 2–0 | 2–0 | 4–1 | 3–2 | 3–0 |
| Sevilla Atlético | 2–2 | 1–1 | 0–0 | 0–0 | 0–0 | | 1–0 | 0–0 | 1–0 | 1–1 | 1–0 | 2–0 | 2–1 | 2–0 | 5–0 | 2–0 | 2–1 | 3–0 | 2–0 | 4–1 |
| Xerez CD | 0–2 | 1–0 | 2–0 | 2–2 | 1–1 | 6–2 | | 3–0 | 0–0 | 0–2 | 2–1 | 4–3 | 3–1 | 4–1 | 1–1 | 2–1 | 2–1 | 2–1 | 0–1 | 2–0 |
| CD San Andrés | 0–0 | 3–1 | 0–2 | 3–1 | 0–0 | 0–3 | 3–1 | | 3–1 | 2–0 | 1–0 | 1–1 | 4–2 | 2–0 | 1–1 | 1–0 | 1–1 | 2–0 | 2–1 | 5–1 |
| Linares CF | 2–2 | 0–0 | 1–1 | 2–1 | 1–1 | 0–0 | 1–0 | 0–0 | | 3–2 | 1–0 | 1–0 | 2–1 | 3–2 | 3–1 | 2–0 | 0–0 | 1–0 | 2–1 | 2–1 |
| Onteniente CF | 1–1 | 0–0 | 1–3 | 1–5 | 3–2 | 5–1 | 2–0 | 1–0 | 2–1 | | 2–1 | 1–0 | 2–0 | 4–0 | 3–0 | 2–0 | 0–2 | 2–1 | 0–1 | 7–2 |
| UE Lleida | 0–0 | 0–1 | 2–2 | 2–0 | 3–0 | 1–0 | 1–0 | 1–1 | 2–2 | 5–1 | | 0–0 | 3–0 | 0–1 | 2–1 | 5–0 | 3–0 | 2–2 | 3–1 | 5–0 |
| CD Diter Zafra | 1–1 | 0–1 | 0–0 | 2–4 | 1–1 | 3–1 | 1–1 | 2–1 | 0–1 | 0–0 | 1–1 | | 1–1 | 2–1 | 2–0 | 1–2 | 1–0 | 0–0 | 3–0 | 1–0 |
| Gerona CF | 2–4 | 0–1 | 3–1 | 1–2 | 1–2 | 1–2 | 1–1 | 1–0 | 6–1 | 5–1 | 1–1 | 1–1 | | 1–0 | 1–0 | 1–0 | 1–0 | 3–0 | 2–1 | 2–0 |
| SD Ibiza | 0–1 | 2–2 | 1–0 | 1–0 | 1–0 | 0–0 | 1–2 | 2–2 | 1–0 | 1–0 | 0–0 | 1–1 | 1–0 | | 1–0 | 3–1 | 1–1 | 1–0 | 5–2 | 3–1 |
| Racing Portuense | 1–0 | 0–0 | 0–1 | 0–2 | 1–2 | 2–1 | 0–1 | 1–0 | 0–0 | 2–0 | 3–0 | 1–0 | 2–2 | 1–0 | | 0–2 | 3–0 | 1–0 | 2–0 | 2–1 |
| CD Badajoz | 1–1 | 1–2 | 2–0 | 2–4 | 0–1 | 3–1 | 2–0 | 3–0 | 1–0 | 1–2 | 0–1 | 2–1 | 2–0 | 0–0 | 0–1 | | 1–0 | 1–0 | 2–1 | 6–0 |
| Córdoba CF | 0–0 | 1–1 | 2–0 | 0–0 | 0–0 | 2–2 | 2–2 | 0–0 | 0–1 | 0–1 | 2–2 | 0–4 | 0–0 | 3–0 | 2–1 | 1–0 | | 3–1 | 2–2 | 6–1 |
| CP Cacereño | 0–1 | 0–0 | 0–3 | 2–3 | 2–1 | 2–0 | 1–1 | 0–1 | 1–1 | 0–3 | 2–1 | 2–1 | 2–1 | 1–0 | 0–0 | 2–1 | 4–2 | | 4–0 | 4–2 |
| Vinaroz CF | 0–2 | 1–2 | 0–1 | 2–2 | 1–1 | 1–1 | 0–1 | 3–3 | 2–0 | 3–1 | 3–1 | 1–1 | 5–0 | 1–0 | 5–2 | 2–1 | 4–1 | 3–1 | | 2–1 |
| CD Olímpico | 0–3 | 1–2 | 2–3 | 2–4 | 1–1 | 2–1 | 0–0 | 0–0 | 1–0 | 2–1 | 2–3 | 1–2 | 2–3 | 2–2 | 2–5 | 2–3 | 1–2 | 0–2 | 3–0 | |

Source: arquero-arba
Legend: Blue = home team win; Yellow = draw; Red = away team win.

=== Top goalscorers ===
| Goalscorers | Goals | Team |
|---|---|---|
| (Spain) Andoni Murúa | 23 | Levante UD |
| (Spain) Fernando Aramburu | 22 | AgD Ceuta |
| (Spain) Ramón Clotet | 19 | UE Lleida |
| (Spain) Ángel Robles | 16 | Onteniente CF |
| (Spain) Enrique Martín | 16 | UE Lleida |

=== Top goalkeepers ===
| Goalkeeper | Goals | Matches | Average | Team |
|---|---|---|---|---|
| (Spain) Vicente Amigó | 18 | 35 | 0.51 | Gimnástico de Tarragona |
| (Spain) Jorge Barrie | 20 | 38 | 0.53 | Levante UD |
| (Spain) José Cervantes | 27 | 33 | 0.82 | AgD Ceuta |
| (Spain) Hilario Sánchez | 29 | 30 | 0.97 | CD Díter Zafra |
| (Spain) Jesús Luis Sánchez | 38 | 38 | 1.00 | CF Calvo Sotelo |
