= 1972–73 Tercera División =

Tercera División
- Season: 1972–73

The 1972–73 Tercera División was the 39th edition since its establishment.

== League tables ==
=== Group I ===
Pos	Team	Pld	W	D	L	GF	GA	GD	Pts
1	Ourense	38	23	11	4	70	22	+48	57
2	Ensidesa	38	19	14	5	41	27	+14	52
3	Palencia	38	22	8	8	54	21	+33	52
4	Getxo	38	19	6	13	57	34	+23	44
5	Bilbao Athletic	38	16	11	11	63	45	+18	43
6	Sestao	38	18	5	15	56	46	+10	41
7	Gimnástica de Torrelavega	38	17	6	15	48	44	+4	40
8	Langreo	38	13	14	11	40	28	+12	40
9	Racing de Ferrol	38	15	10	13	52	46	+6	40
10	Caudal	38	17	6	15	44	44	0	40
11	Zamora	38	15	7	16	43	52	−9	37
12	Lemos	38	12	13	13	42	50	−8	37
13	Real Avilés	38	14	8	16	43	38	+5	36
14	Ponferradina	38	11	11	16	31	47	−16	33
15	Baskonia	38	12	9	17	42	54	−12	33
16	Laredo	38	12	8	18	30	54	−24	32
17	Gran Peña	38	10	10	18	46	66	−20	30
18	Compostela	38	10	8	20	30	54	−24	28
19	Siero	38	9	9	20	27	54	−27	27
20	Llodio	38	5	8	25	28	61	−33	18

=== Group II ===
Pos	Team	Pld	W	D	L	GF	GA	GD	Pts
1	Salamanca	38	24	11	3	82	23	+59	59
2	Atlético Madrileño	38	21	9	8	57	27	+30	51
3	Alavés	38	19	12	7	54	26	+28	50
4	Castilla	38	18	13	7	57	28	+29	49
5	Colonia Moscardó	38	20	6	12	55	42	+13	46
6	Pegaso	38	15	16	7	60	36	+24	46
7	Tudelano	38	16	9	13	41	35	+6	41
8	San Sebastián	38	18	3	17	64	52	+12	39
9	Calvo Sotelo Andorra	38	17	5	16	39	39	0	39
10	Osasuna Promesas	38	13	12	13	43	46	−3	38
11	Calvo Sotelo	38	13	11	14	39	40	−1	37
12	Eibar	38	13	11	14	42	50	−8	37
13	Huesca	38	14	8	16	57	47	+10	36
14	Getafe	38	15	6	17	39	41	−2	36
15	Aretxabaleta	38	11	13	14	36	54	−18	35
16	Mirandés	38	11	8	19	30	62	−32	30
17	Torrejón	38	9	8	21	25	46	−21	26
18	Chantrea	38	8	10	20	25	55	−30	26
19	Béjar Industrial	38	8	6	24	27	67	−40	22
20	Ejea	38	4	9	25	34	92	−58	17

=== Group III ===
Pos	Team	Pld	W	D	L	GF	GA	GD	Pts
1	Levante	38	23	8	7	58	26	+32	54
2	Girona	38	17	13	8	42	26	+16	47
3	Calella	38	19	8	11	42	27	+15	46
4	Lleida	38	16	10	12	43	38	+5	42
5	Ibiza	38	17	8	13	49	42	+7	42
6	Menorca	38	16	9	13	43	37	+6	41
7	Alcoyano	38	18	5	15	43	40	+3	41
8	Ontinyent	38	15	10	13	54	40	+14	40
9	Tortosa	38	16	7	15	47	45	+2	39
10	Europa	38	15	9	14	42	41	+1	39
11	Terrassa	38	12	15	11	50	46	+4	39
12	Villarreal	38	15	9	14	45	43	+2	39
13	Atlètic de Ciutadella	38	13	11	14	41	42	−1	37
14	Vinaròs	38	15	6	17	49	44	+5	36
15	Olímpic de Xàtiva	38	14	8	16	42	48	−6	36
16	Poblense	38	15	5	18	57	52	+5	35
17	Júpiter	38	13	8	17	52	57	−5	34
18	Masnou	38	10	8	20	38	65	−27	28
19	Atlético Baleares	38	8	8	22	26	48	−22	24
20	Acero	38	6	9	23	38	94	−56	21

=== Group IV ===
Pos	Team	Pld	W	D	L	GF	GA	GD	Pts
1	Linares	38	20	10	8	67	29	+38	50
2	Cartagena	38	18	13	7	61	26	+35	49
3	Badajoz	38	20	5	13	52	35	+17	45
4	Portuense	38	15	10	13	46	43	+3	40
5	Valdepeñas	38	14	12	12	39	34	+5	40
6	Xerez	38	12	16	10	48	46	+2	40
7	Melilla	38	16	8	14	46	49	−3	40
8	Recreativo de Huelva	38	14	12	12	36	28	+8	40
9	Real Jaén	38	17	6	15	42	41	+1	40
10	Almería	38	17	5	16	57	55	+2	39
11	Hellín	38	17	5	16	48	49	−1	39
12	Ceuta	38	13	12	13	49	44	+5	38
13	San Fernando	38	13	11	14	46	49	−3	37
14	Eldense	38	11	13	14	39	41	−2	35
15	O'Donnell	38	13	8	17	42	64	−22	34
16	Balompédica Linense	38	12	10	16	26	47	−21	34
17	Algemesí	38	12	10	16	43	55	−12	34
18	Extremadura	38	13	6	19	46	54	−8	32
19	Atlético Malagueño	38	8	12	18	31	48	−17	28
20	Sevilla Atlético	38	9	8	21	28	55	−27	26

== Promotion playoff ==
Team 1	Agg.	Team 2	1st leg	2nd leg
Tenerife	6–2	Ensidesa	6–2	0–0
Osasuna	3–2	Cartagena	2–0	1–2
Córdoba	5–3	Girona	3–0	2–3
Gimnàstic de Tarragona	5–1	Atlético Madrileño	4–0	1–1

== Relegation playoff ==
Team 1	Agg.	Team 2	1st leg	2nd leg
Real Avilés	4–1	Santurtzi	2–0	2–1
Real Unión	1–1 (p)	Ponferradina	0–1	1–0
Artajonés	2–9	Baskonia	1–1	1–8
Gijón Industrial	3–2	Laredo	2–1	1–1
Guadalajara	3–2	Huesca	2–0	1–2
Getafe	6–2	Llerenense	3–1	3–1
Mahón	(p) 3–3	Aretxabaleta	3–0	0–3
Alicante	2–5	Mirandés	2–1	0–4
Cacabelense	2–4	Atlètic de Ciutadella	2–1	0–3
Vinaròs	2–1	Jerez Industrial	2–1	0–0
Olímpic de Xàtiva	6–1	Imperio de Ceuta	4–0	2–1
Poblense	2–3	Gandía	1–1	1–2
Atlético Monzón	2–7	San Fernando	1–4	1–3
Eldense	4–0	Santoña	3–0	1–0
Gramenet	2–3	O'Donnell	2–0	0–3
Arosa	1–2	Balompédica Linense	0–1	1–1

== Season records ==
- Most wins: 24, Salamanca.
- Most draws: 16, Pegaso and Xerez.
- Most losses: 25, Llodio and Ejea.
- Most goals for: 82, Salamanca.
- Most goals against: 94, Acero.
- Most points: 59, Salamanca.
- Fewest wins: 4, Ejea.
- Fewest draws: 3, San Sebastián.
- Fewest losses: 3, Salamanca.
- Fewest goals for: 25, Torrejón and Chantrea.
- Fewest goals against: 21, Palencia.
- Fewest points: 17, Ejea.
