= CD Olímpic de Xàtiva =

Spanish football team

Coordinates: 38°59′33.78″N 0°30′59.73″W

Olímpic Xàtiva
- Full name: CD Olímpic de Xàtiva
- Founded: 1932; 94 years ago
- Ground: La Murta, Xàtiva
- Capacity: 9,000
- Owner: Anuj Gupta
- Head coach: Berna Ballester
- League: Lliga Comunitat – South
- 2024–25: Lliga Comunitat – South, 6th of 16
Home colours	Away colours	Third colours

Club Deportivo Olímpic de Xàtiva is a Spanish football team based in Xàtiva, in the Valencian Community. Founded in 1932 it currently plays in Lliga Comunitat – South, holding home games at Campo de Futbol La Murta.

== History ==
Football in Xàtiva can be traced back to 1924 when a number of clubs from the city played in the Valencian regional leagues. Club Deportivo Olímpic was founded in 1932, and from that date on remained the main representative of the city. During the Spanish Civil War, it played in many regional competitions and won promotion to the Tercera División in 1943, lasting one season, but being promoted again in 1945; due to financial difficulties the club forfeited from the competition in 1951, only returning five years later.

For the next decade Olímpic was a dominant force in the third level, successively finishing in the top five and reaching the Segunda División promotion play-offs three times, being ousted by Gimnàstic de Tarragona in 1959, CD Málaga in 1960 and CD Atlético Baleares in 1961. These disappointments led to a slow descent which culminated in relegation to the regional championships, following the restructuring of the divisions in 1968.

Olímpic returned to the third division – renamed Segunda División B – in 1977, finishing in eighth position in its debut season but bottom of the charts in the following campaign, eventually slipping back to Preferente in 1982. It returned to the third tier in 1987–88 under the guidance of coach Benito Floro (later of Real Madrid), and the club finished in a best-ever fourth position in the category, missing out on promotion in the final day of the season against UD Alzira. In 1991 it returned to level four, remaining there for the vast majority of the following two decades, with five years spent in the regional leagues.

At the end of the 2010–11 season, after three unsuccessful attempts in the playoffs, Olímpic de Xàtiva returned to the third division after an absence of 20 years, after successively ousting Atlético Malagueño, CD Anguiano and CD Izarra. On 7 December 2013, with the side still in that level, it faced Real Madrid in the Copa del Rey's round-of-32, managing a 0–0 home draw in the first leg.

In March 2018, it was announced that Indian I-League club Sudeva Delhi has bought the majority stakes of the club.

== Season to season ==
Season	Tier	Division	Place	Copa del Rey
1935–36	4	1ª Reg.	4th	
1939–40	4	1ª Reg.	6th	
1940–41	3	3ª	2nd	
1941–42	3	1ª Reg.	7th	
1942–43	3	1ª Reg.	5th	
1943–44	3	3ª	3rd	
1944–45	4	1ª Reg.	4th	
1945–46	3	3ª	4th	
1946–47	3	3ª	4th	
1947–48	3	3ª	7th	Third round
1948–49	3	3ª	11th	Third round
1949–50	3	3ª	4th	
1950–51	3	3ª	16th	
1951–52	4	1ª Reg.	13th	
1952–53	4	1ª Reg.	9th	
1953–54	4	1ª Reg.	13th	
1954–55	4	1ª Reg.	5th	
1955–56	4	1ª Reg.	1st	
1956–57	3	3ª	4th	
1957–58	3	3ª	4th	

Season	Tier	Division	Place	Copa del Rey
1958–59	3	3ª	1st	
1959–60	3	3ª	1st	
1960–61	3	3ª	1st	
1961–62	3	3ª	5th	
1962–63	3	3ª	6th	
1963–64	3	3ª	8th	
1964–65	3	3ª	5th	
1965–66	3	3ª	16th	
1966–67	3	3ª	13th	
1967–68	3	3ª	17th	
1968–69	4	1ª Reg.	15th	
1969–70	4	1ª Reg.	6th	
1970–71	4	Reg. Pref.	2nd	
1971–72	3	3ª	15th	First round
1972–73	3	3ª	15th	First round
1973–74	3	3ª	6th	First round
1974–75	3	3ª	12th	Third round
1975–76	3	3ª	4th	First round
1976–77	3	3ª	5th	First round
1977–78	3	2ª B	8th	First round

Season	Tier	Division	Place	Copa del Rey
1978–79	3	2ª B	20th	
1979–80	4	3ª	16th	Second round
1980–81	4	3ª	12th	
1981–82	4	3ª	18th	
1982–83	5	Reg. Pref.	9th	
1983–84	5	Reg. Pref.	9th	
1984–85	5	Reg. Pref.	1st	
1985–86	4	3ª	4th	
1986–87	4	3ª	1st	Second round
1987–88	3	2ª B	4th	Second round
1988–89	3	2ª B	10th	First round
1989–90	3	2ª B	10th	
1990–91	3	2ª B	20th	First round
1991–92	4	3ª	10th	First round
1992–93	5	Reg. Pref.	2nd	
1993–94	5	Reg. Pref.	1st	
1994–95	4	3ª	8th	
1995–96	4	3ª	16th	
1996–97	4	3ª	4th	
1997–98	4	3ª	4th	

Season	Tier	Division	Place	Copa del Rey
1998–99	4	3ª	14th	
1999–2000	4	3ª	19th	
2000–01	5	Reg. Pref.	5th	
2001–02	5	Reg. Pref.	2nd	
2002–03	5	Reg. Pref.	3rd	
2003–04	5	Reg. Pref.	2nd	
2004–05	5	Reg. Pref.	3rd	
2005–06	5	Reg. Pref.	5th	
2006–07	5	Reg. Pref.	1st	
2007–08	4	3ª	19th	
2008–09	5	Reg. Pref.	1st	
2009–10	4	3ª	7th	
2010–11	4	3ª	2nd	
2011–12	3	2ª B	9th	First round
2012–13	3	2ª B	5th	
2013–14	3	2ª B	10th	Round of 32
2014–15	3	2ª B	8th	
2015–16	3	2ª B	16th	
2016–17	4	3ª	1st	
2017–18	4	3ª	7th	First round

Season	Tier	Division	Place	Copa del Rey
2018–19	4	3ª	3rd	
2019–20	4	3ª	10th	
2020–21	4	3ª	4th / 3rd	
2021–22	5	3ª RFEF	15th	
2022–23	6	Reg. Pref.	4th	
2023–24	6	Lliga Com.	3rd	
2024–25	6	Lliga Com.	6th	
2025–26	6	Lliga Com.	4th	
2026–27	6	Lliga Com.		

- 11 seasons in Segunda División B
- 46 seasons in Tercera División
- 1 season in Tercera División RFEF

== Selected former players ==
Note: this list includes players that have played at least 100 league games and/or have reached international status.

- (Colombia) Edwin Congo
- (Equatorial Guinea) Alberto
- (Equatorial Guinea) Raúl Fabiani
- (Equatorial Guinea) Nata
- (Equatorial Guinea) Sipo
- (Philippines) Ángel Guirado
- (Spain) Francis

== Selected former coaches ==
- (Spain) Benito Floro (1987–1988)

== Stadium ==
Sudeva Olimpic holds home matches at Campo de Futbol La Murta, with a capacity of 9,000 spectators, 2,000 seated. The pitch dimensions are 103 x 63m, and the site served as a football field since the late 1920s/early 1930s, being the only home ground the club used.

Until 1960 the ground was very basic, consisting of a simple uncovered tribune on the east side of the ground and a single step around the pitch. In the 1960–61 season leading player Richart was transferred to Sporting de Gijón, and it is said that this money was used to build the popular terrace at the north end of the ground. Simple improvements to the terracing occurred during the 1980s, but the next major improvement was the building of a new covered main stand in 2000; plastic seats and an electronic scoreboard were added in 2002, and artificial turf was installed in October 2005.

== Affiliated clubs ==
The following club is currently affiliated with Sudeva Olimpic:

- (India) Sudeva Delhi FC (2018–present)

== See also ==
- List of football clubs in Spain
