= Edu Caballer =

Spanish footballer (born 1981)

Personal information
- Full name: Eduard Caballer Bel
- Date of birth: 2 October 1981 (age 45)
- Place of birth: Vinaròs, Spain
- Height: 1.81 m (5 ft 11 1/2 in)
- Position: Centre back

Youth career
- Vinaròs
- Villarreal

Senior career*
Years	Team	Apps	(Gls)
2000–2009	Villarreal B	119	(1)
2000–2001	→ Onda (loan)		
2001	→ Vinaròs (loan)		
2010	Benlloch	7	(1)
- * Club domestic league appearances and goals

Eduard 'Edu' Caballer Bel (born 2 October 1981 in Vinaròs, Castellón) is a Spanish retired football player who played as a central defender.
