= Bernabé Ballester =

Spanish footballer

Berna
Personal information
- Full name: Bernabé Ballester Marco
- Date of birth: 12 February 1982 (age 44)
- Place of birth: Xàtiva, Spain
- Height: 1.88 m (6 ft 2 in)
- Position: Centre-back

Youth career
- 1987–1997: Olímpic Xàtiva
- 1997–2001: Real Madrid

Senior career*
Years	Team	Apps	(Gls)
2001–2002	Real Madrid C		
2002	Real Madrid B	0	(0)
2002–2007	Valencia B	114	(2)
2007–2009	Mouscron	7	(0)
2009–2011	Alcoyano	50	(1)
2011–2012	Gandía	34	(0)
2012–2014	Ontinyent	61	(3)
2014–2015	Avilés	29	(2)
2015–2020	Olímpic Xàtiva	158	(6)
Total		453	(14)

International career
1998–1999	Spain U16	8	(0)

Managerial career
- 2020–2022: Olímpic Xàtiva
- 2022–2024: Atzeneta
- 2024–2025: La Nucía
Medal record
Representing Spain
UEFA European Under-16 Championship
Winner	1999 Czech Republic
- * Club domestic league appearances and goals

Bernabé Ballester Marco (born 12 February 1982 in Xàtiva, Province of Valencia), commonly known as Berna, is a Spanish former footballer who played as a central defender, currently a manager.

== Honours ==
Spain U16

- UEFA European Under-16 Championship: 1999
