= Pichi Lucas =

Spanish footballer and manager

Personal information
- Full name: Argimiro Pérez García
- Date of birth: 14 March 1959 (age 67)
- Place of birth: Camponaraya, Spain
- Height: 1.80 m (5 ft 11 in)
- Position: Striker

Youth career
- Pabellón Ourense
- Rivadavia
- Celta

Senior career*
Years	Team	Apps	(Gls)
1977–1979	Gran Peña	74	(31)
1979–1990	Celta	246	(72)
1979–1981	→ Córdoba (loan)	45	(17)
1990–1991	Ourense	37	(17)
1991–1995	Compostela	105	(30)
Total		507	(167)

Managerial career
- 1998: Compostela (interim)
- 2000: Compostela (interim)
- 2003–2004: Compostela
- 2005–2007: Ponferradina
- 2007–2008: Cartagena
- 2009–2010: Oviedo
- 2012–2013: Celta B
- 2016–2017: Jumilla
- * Club domestic league appearances and goals

Argimiro Pérez García (born 14 March 1959), commonly known as Pichi Lucas, is a Spanish former professional footballer who played as a striker.

He spent most of his career with Celta, for which he appeared in 288 official games and scored 92 goals. His La Liga input consisted of 113 matches and 18 goals over six seasons, also representing in the competition Compostela.

Lucas subsequently worked as a manager.

== Playing career ==
Born in Camponaraya, Castile and León, Lucas' professional career was solely associated to two Galician clubs, RC Celta de Vigo and SD Compostela. After a loan to lowly Córdoba CF where he performed his compulsory military service, he returned to the former for the 1981–82 season, scoring a career-best 26 goals in 37 games en route to a La Liga promotion.

Lucas made his debut in the Spanish top flight on 5 September 1982, playing the full 90 minutes in a 1–0 away loss against Sevilla FC. He scored his first goal in the competition twenty days later in the 2–2 home draw with RCD Español, but only added another until the end of the campaign and his team was eventually relegated; during his tenure with Celta, he experienced a further two promotions and relegations.

In the summer of 1991, after one year in the Segunda División B with neighbouring CD Ourense, Lucas signed for Compostela from Segunda División. He contributed nine goals in 28 matches in his third season, as they reached the top tier for the first time in their history.

Lucas retired at the end of the 1994–95 campaign at the age of 36, having scored four times in only 14 appearances. Compos finished 16th, but no teams were relegated and the league was subsequently expanded from 20 to 22 sides.

== Coaching career ==
From 1998 to 2000, Lucas acted as interim manager at Compostela, being in charge for a total of eight second-division games and winning only two. He subsequently worked mainly in lower league football, helping SD Ponferradina reach division two in 2006, a first-ever for the club.

Lucas was fired on 30 April 2007 after a 3–3 home draw against UD Vecindario (seven rounds remaining), as the side went on to suffer relegation. In the following years he worked in the third tier, with FC Cartagena, Real Oviedo, Celta de Vigo B and FC Jumilla.

== Managerial statistics ==
As of 13 May 2017

Managerial record by team and tenure
Team	Nat	From	To	Record								Ref
Team	Nat	From	To	G	W	D	L	GF	GA	GD	Win %	Ref
Compostela (interim)	(Spain)	26 October 1998	15 November 1998	3	1	2	0	6	4	+2	33.33	
Compostela (interim)	(Spain)	21 February 2000	27 March 2000	5	1	0	4	4	8	−4	20.00	
Compostela	(Spain)	1 July 2003	5 January 2004	20	3	6	11	10	30	−20	15.00	
Ponferradina	(Spain)	1 July 2005	30 April 2007	80	28	27	25	91	87	+4	35.00	
Cartagena	(Spain)	10 December 2007	30 June 2008	22	8	8	6	24	20	+4	36.36	
Oviedo	(Spain)	13 October 2009	7 November 2010	46	21	12	13	69	50	+19	45.65	
Celta B	(Spain)	6 February 2012	30 June 2013	59	29	19	11	102	61	+41	49.15	
Jumilla	(Spain)	14 June 2016	30 June 2017	38	12	12	14	32	37	−5	31.58	
Total				273	103	86	84	338	297	+41	37.73	—

== Honours ==
Celta

- Segunda División: 1981–82
- Segunda División B: 1980–81

Individual

- Pichichi Trophy (Segunda División): 1981–82
