= Galáctico Pegaso =

- Full name: Galáctico Pegaso
- Founded: 1962
- Dissolved: 2010
- Ground: La Foresta, Tres Cantos, Madrid, Spain
- Capacity: 2,000
- 2009–10: 3ª - Group 7, 20th of 20
Home colours	Away colours

Galáctico Pegaso was a Spanish football team based in Tres Cantos, in the autonomous Community of Madrid. Founded in 1962 and dissolved in 2010, it held home games at Estadio La Foresta, with a capacity of 2,000 seats.

== History ==
In 1962, Pegaso company, founded Club Deportivo Pegaso', with the club fluctuating between the regional leagues and Tercera División in the first 16 years of existence. In 1977, Segunda División B had been created as the new third level and, after two seasons in that category, it returned to Tercera - now division four - for a further nine years.

In the late 1980s/early 1990s, the team played three more seasons in the third division, spending the remaining years in the fourth. In the 2000, the team was moved to Tres Cantos in the Community of Madrid, merging with Club Deportivo Tres Cantos two years later, and being renamed Pegaso Tres Cantos.

In 2004, another name change, with the club being renamed Sección de Acción Deportiva Tres Cantos Pegaso. Three years later, after a merge with Tornado Tres Cantos, the latter acted as its reserve team for one year.

Subsequently, the team became the property of Stars2007 Group S.L., changing names again, now to Galáctico Pegaso. In May 2010, after losing the company's support, the club was merged with Club Deportivo Islas to form UD Tres Cantos Islas.

=== Club background ===
- Club Deportivo Pegaso - (1962–2002)
- Pegaso Tres Cantos - (2002–04)
- Sección de Acción Deportiva Tres Cantos Pegaso - (2004–08)
- Galáctico Pegaso - (2008–10)

CD Pegaso Tres Cantos club logo

== Season to season ==
Season	Tier	Division	Place	Copa del Rey
1962–63	6	3ª Reg.	2nd	
1963–64	5	2ª Reg.	4th	
1964–65	5	2ª Reg.	1st	
1965–66	4	1ª Reg.	4th	
1966–67	4	1ª Reg.	1st	
1967–68	3	3ª	8th	
1968–69	3	3ª	11th	
1969–70	3	3ª	11th	
1970–71	4	1ª Reg.	2nd	
1971–72	4	1ª Reg.	2nd	
1972–73	3	3ª	6th	Third round
1973–74	3	3ª	12th	First round
1974–75	3	3ª	9th	Second round
1975–76	3	3ª	11th	Fourth round
1976–77	3	3ª	3rd	Second round
1977–78	3	2ª B	15th	First round
1978–79	3	2ª B	19th	Second round
1979–80	4	3ª	6th	Second round
1980–81	4	3ª	13th	First round
1981–82	4	3ª	5th	

Season	Tier	Division	Place	Copa del Rey
1982–83	4	3ª	4th	Second round
1983–84	4	3ª	1st	Third round
1984–85	4	3ª	13th	Third round
1985–86	4	3ª	9th	
1986–87	4	3ª	2nd	
1987–88	4	3ª	1st	Second round
1988–89	3	2ª B	9th	
1989–90	3	2ª B	16th	
1990–91	3	2ª B	17th	Second round
1991–92	4	3ª	9th	Second round
1992–93	4	3ª	17th	
1993–94	4	3ª	12th	
1994–95	4	3ª	5th	
1995–96	4	3ª	12th	
1996–97	4	3ª	8th	
1997–98	4	3ª	11th	
1998–99	4	3ª	15th	
1999–2000	4	3ª	13th	
2000–01	4	3ª	15th	
2001–02	4	3ª	15th	

Season	Tier	Division	Place	Copa del Rey
2002–03	4	3ª	15th	
2003–04	4	3ª	2nd	
2004–05	4	3ª	6th	
2005–06	4	3ª	6th	
2006–07	4	3ª	17th	
2007–08	5	Reg. Pref.	1st	
2008–09	4	3ª	16th	
2009–10	4	3ª	20th	

- 5 seasons in Segunda División B
- 35 seasons in Tercera División

== Famous players ==
- (Spain) Alfredo Santaelena
- (Spain) Carlos Cuéllar
- (Spain) Quique Sánchez Flores
- (Spain) José García Calvo
- (Spain) Miguel Hernández
- (Spain) Jaime Mata
- (Spain) Juan Sabas
