= Francis Solar =

Spanish footballer

Personal information
- Full name: Francisco Javier Solar González
- Date of birth: 14 September 1983 (age 43)
- Place of birth: Málaga, Spain
- Height: 1.88 m (6 ft 2 in)
- Position: Goalkeeper

Youth career
- Málaga

Senior career*
Years	Team	Apps	(Gls)
2003–2004	Málaga B	2	(0)
2004–2006	Valencia B		
2006–2007	Eldense	0	(0)
2007–2008	Juventud Barrio Cristo	24	(0)
2008–2009	Ontinyent	0	(0)
2009–2010	Juventud Barrio Cristo	31	(0)
2010–2014	Olímpic Xàtiva	130	(0)
2014–2015	Reus	0	(0)
2015	Marbella	9	(0)
2015	Lincoln		
2015–2016	Vélez	15	(0)
2016–2019	Zenit Torremolinos	55	(0)

International career
2001	Spain U17	2	(0)
- * Club domestic league appearances and goals

Francisco "Francis" Javier Solar González (born 14 September 1983) is a Spanish former footballer who played as a goalkeeper.

== Club career ==
Born in Málaga, Andalusia, Francis finished his graduation with local Málaga CF, and made his senior debuts with the B-team on 30 August 2003, in a 2–3 away loss against UD Almería in the Segunda División championship. He played in Segunda División B but also in Tercera División in the following years, representing Valencia CF Mestalla, CD Eldense, UD Juventud Barrio del Cristo (two stints), Ontinyent CF and CD Olímpic de Xàtiva; with the latter he achieved promotion from the fourth level in 2011, appearing in 27 matches.

On 22 June 2014, after four full seasons as an undisputed starter, Francis moved to fellow third division side CF Reus Deportiu. On 16 January of the following year, after being a backup to Édgar Badía, he joined Marbella FC in the same level.
