= 1976–77 Segunda División =

46th season of the second-tier football league in Spain

Segunda División
- Season: 1976–77
- Dates: 4 September 1976 – 5 June 1977
- Champions: Sporting Gijón (5th title)
- Promoted: Cádiz; Rayo Vallecano
- Relegated: Pontevedra; Levante; San Andrés; Barcelona Atlètic
- Matches: 380
- Goals: 908 (2.39 per match)
- Top goalscorer: Quini (27 goals)

The 1976–77 Segunda División season saw 20 teams participate in the second flight Spanish league. Sporting Gijón won the league.

Sporting Gijón, Cádiz CF and Rayo Vallecano were promoted to Primera División. Beginning this season, there is no relegation playoff. Pontevedra CF, Levante UD, CD San Andrés and Barcelona Atlètic were relegated to the new Segunda División B.

== Teams ==
Location of teams in Segunda División 1976-77
Canary Islands

Club	City	Stadium
Alavés	Vitoria	Mendizorrotza
Barcelona Atlètic	Barcelona	Fabra i Coats
Cádiz	Cádiz	Ramón de Carranza
Calvo Sotelo	Puertollano	Calvo Sotelo
Castellón	Castellón de la Plana	Castalia
Córdoba	Córdoba	El Árcangel
Deportivo La Coruña	La Coruña	Riazor
Getafe Deportivo	Getafe	Las Margaritas
Granada	Granada	Los Cármenes
Jaén	Jaén	La Victoria
Levante	Valencia	Nuevo Estadio
Oviedo	Oviedo	Carlos Tartiere
Pontevedra	Pontevedra	Pasarón
Rayo Vallecano	Madrid	Nuevo Estadio Vallecas
Recreativo Huelva	Huelva	Municipal
San Andrés	Barcelona	Calle Santa Coloma
Sporting Gijón	Gijón	El Molinón
Tarrasa	Terrassa	Olímpic de Terrassa
Tenerife	Santa Cruz de Tenerife	Heliodoro Rodríguez López
Real Valladolid	Valladolid	José Zorrilla

== Final table ==
Pos	Team	Pld	W	D	L	GF	GA	GD	Pts	Promotion or relegation
1	Sporting de Gijón	38	18	11	9	62	35	+27	47	Promoted to Primera División
2	Cádiz CF	38	17	12	9	60	42	+18	46	Promoted to Primera División
3	Rayo Vallecano	38	17	11	10	46	34	+12	45	Promoted to Primera División
4	Real Jaén	38	15	13	10	42	32	+10	43	
5	Real Oviedo	38	18	7	13	48	43	+5	43	
6	CD Tenerife	38	15	10	13	48	48	0	40	
7	Tarrasa FC	38	13	14	11	44	34	+10	40	
8	Deportivo Alavés	38	14	12	12	57	42	+15	40	
9	Recreativo de Huelva	38	14	10	14	42	50	−8	38	
10	Granada CF	38	14	8	16	42	39	+3	36	
11	Deportivo de La Coruña	38	11	14	13	40	50	−10	36	
12	Real Valladolid	38	14	8	16	57	56	+1	36	
13	Getafe Deportivo	38	12	11	15	37	48	−11	35	
14	CD Castellón	38	14	7	17	46	45	+1	35	
15	Córdoba CF	38	10	15	13	39	45	−6	35	
16	CF Calvo Sotelo	38	14	6	18	39	56	−17	34	
17	Pontevedra CF	38	10	14	14	34	44	−10	34	Relegated to Segunda División B
18	Levante UD	38	12	10	16	47	61	−14	34	Relegated to Segunda División B
19	CD San Andrés	38	10	13	15	39	52	−13	33	Relegated to Segunda División B
20	Barcelona Atlètic	38	10	10	18	39	52	−13	30	Relegated to Segunda División B

Source: BDFutbol

== Results ==
Home \ Away	ALV	BAR	CÁD	CAL	CAS	CÓR	DEP	GET	GRA	JAÉ	LEV	OVI	PON	RAY	REC	SAN	SPG	TAR	TEN	VLD
Alavés	—	1–1	1–1	3–0	2–0	3–0	5–1	0–1	0–0	0–0	6–0	1–3	2–0	0–0	3–1	4–1	1–1	1–1	1–1	3–1
Barcelona At.	1–2	—	1–1	1–0	2–0	2–2	3–0	0–0	0–0	1–1	1–0	1–2	1–1	1–1	0–0	2–1	0–2	0–1	7–1	2–1
Cádiz	0–2	2–0	—	0–0	3–1	2–1	4–1	3–0	3–0	2–1	1–0	2–1	2–2	2–0	3–1	5–1	1–5	2–0	0–0	5–0
Calvo Sotelo	1–2	3–0	1–1	—	1–0	1–0	2–4	3–2	1–0	1–0	3–2	0–1	1–0	2–1	0–0	2–1	0–2	2–1	2–1	2–1
Castellón	2–1	0–1	2–0	2–2	—	3–1	0–0	5–2	0–1	1–1	1–2	3–1	1–0	3–1	2–0	3–0	2–0	1–0	3–0	3–1
Córdoba	1–0	0–0	2–2	2–0	3–0	—	2–1	0–0	2–1	1–1	1–1	0–0	1–0	3–0	3–0	0–0	1–2	1–0	0–0	2–0
Deportivo La Coruña	2–2	2–3	2–1	1–1	2–1	2–1	—	3–1	0–0	1–0	2–1	2–2	0–0	2–0	1–1	0–0	0–0	1–0	0–0	2–0
Getafe	1–1	2–0	1–1	2–1	1–0	1–0	1–2	—	3–1	0–0	1–1	0–1	4–1	0–1	3–0	3–2	1–0	0–2	1–0	1–1
Granada	2–3	1–0	0–1	3–0	0–0	2–1	2–2	4–0	—	2–0	1–0	2–1	2–0	2–0	1–2	1–0	2–1	1–2	2–0	4–1
Jaén	1–0	1–0	2–2	3–1	1–1	0–0	2–1	1–0	2–1	—	0–1	3–1	1–0	4–1	2–0	0–0	1–0	0–1	2–1	4–2
Levante	2–1	3–1	1–1	1–1	1–1	2–2	3–1	1–0	1–1	1–2	—	2–1	1–0	0–0	4–1	2–2	2–1	0–0	4–1	0–3
Oviedo	2–0	1–0	1–2	1–0	3–2	1–0	2–0	4–0	2–0	1–0	2–1	—	1–1	0–1	1–0	2–0	1–2	1–1	0–1	2–1
Pontevedra	2–1	2–0	0–1	2–1	1–1	0–0	1–0	2–0	1–1	1–0	2–1	3–1	—	1–1	2–2	0–0	1–0	1–1	2–2	0–2
Rayo Vallecano	3–1	2–1	3–0	2–1	1–0	6–0	0–0	1–1	2–1	0–0	2–0	1–0	1–1	—	2–0	2–0	3–1	1–0	2–0	0–0
Recreativo Huelva	0–1	5–1	2–1	3–0	2–0	2–2	1–0	0–1	1–0	0–0	2–1	2–2	2–0	2–1	—	1–0	2–1	0–0	3–2	1–1
San Andrés	3–1	0–1	2–1	4–1	1–0	2–1	2–0	1–1	1–0	1–0	3–1	1–1	2–2	1–0	0–0	—	0–0	2–2	0–1	1–3
Sporting Gijón	1–1	3–1	1–0	4–1	3–1	4–0	0–0	1–1	2–1	0–2	4–0	1–1	2–0	1–1	2–1	2–0	—	4–0	3–1	2–1
Tarrasa	0–0	2–1	1–1	0–1	0–1	1–0	0–0	0–0	0–0	2–2	3–0	4–0	3–0	2–2	3–1	3–0	2–2	—	3–0	3–1
Tenerife	1–0	3–1	2–0	1–0	1–0	1–1	3–1	2–0	3–0	1–1	4–1	3–0	0–1	1–0	0–1	3–3	1–1	3–0	—	1–1
Valladolid	4–1	3–1	1–1	2–0	3–0	2–2	3–1	2–1	1–0	3–1	2–3	0–1	2–1	0–1	4–0	1–1	1–1	1–0	1–2	—

Source: BDFutbol
Legend: Blue = home team win; Yellow = draw; Red = away team win.

== Pichichi Trophy for top goalscorers ==
Goalscorers	Goals	Team
(Spain) Quini	27	Sporting de Gijón
(Spain) Enrique Galán	21	Real Oviedo
(Paraguay) Crispín Maciel	20	Tenerife
