= Getafe Deportivo =

- Full name: Club Getafe Deportivo
- Founded: 1923 (reformed in 1946)
- Dissolved: 1983
- Ground: Las Margaritas, Getafe, Madrid, Spain
- Capacity: 5,000
Home colours	Away colours

Club Getafe Deportivo was a Spanish football club based in Getafe, a city in the Madrid metropolitan area, Spain. Founded in 1923 and refounded in 1946, it played six seasons in Segunda División, dissolving in 1983 and being replaced by Getafe CF.

== Club names ==
- Sociedad Getafe Deportivo (1923–1924)
- Club Getafe Deportivo Foot-ball Club (1924–1932)
- Club Getafe Deportivo (1946–1967)
- Club Getafe Kelvinator (1967–1970)
- Club Getafe Deportivo (1970–1983)

== Honours ==
- Copa Federación Centro
  - Winners (1): 1948–49

== Stadiums ==
- Campo del Aeródromo (1923–1927)
- Campo de la Dehesa de la Chica (1927–1930)
- Campo de la Calle del Vinagre (1930–1932)
- Campo del Regimiento de Artillería (1946–1950)
- Campo de los Sindicatos (1950–1956)
- Campo Municipal de San Isidro (1956–1970)
- Estadio Municipal Las Margaritas (1970–1983)

== Season to season ==
Season	Tier	Division	Place	Copa del Rey
1946–47	6	2ª Reg.	7th	
1947–48	6	2ª Reg.	1st	
1948–49	5	2ª Reg. P.	1st	
1949–50	4	1ª Reg.	2nd	
1950–51	4	1ª Reg.	6th	
1951–52	4	1ª Reg.	8th	
1952–53	4	1ª Reg.	2nd	
1953–54	4	1ª Reg.	5th	
1954–55	4	1ª Reg.	6th	
1955–56	4	1ª Reg.	3rd	
1956–57	4	1ª Reg.	2nd	
1957–58	3	3ª	1st	
1958–59	3	3ª	10th	
1959–60	3	3ª	9th	
1960–61	3	3ª	4th	
1961–62	3	3ª	5th	
1962–63	3	3ª	16th	
1963–64	3	3ª	9th	
1964–65	3	3ª	13th	

Season	Tier	Division	Place	Copa del Rey
1965–66	3	3ª	6th	
1966–67	3	3ª	8th	
1967–68	3	3ª	11th	
1968–69	4	1ª Reg.	3rd	
1969–70	4	1ª Reg.	1st	
1970–71	3	3ª	12th	
1971–72	3	3ª	14th	Third round
1972–73	3	3ª	14th	First round
1973–74	3	3ª	7th	First round
1974–75	3	3ª	2nd	Second round
1975–76	3	3ª	1st	Third round
1976–77	2	2ª	13th	Third round
1977–78	2	2ª	16th	Round of 16
1978–79	2	2ª	10th	Third round
1979–80	2	2ª	14th	Fourth round
1980–81	2	2ª	13th	Third round
1981–82	2	2ª	20th	First round
1982–83	4	3ª	5th	First round

- 6 seasons in Segunda División
- 18 seasons in Tercera División
