= Campo de Fútbol La Murta =

Football stadium in Xàtiva, Spain

La Murta
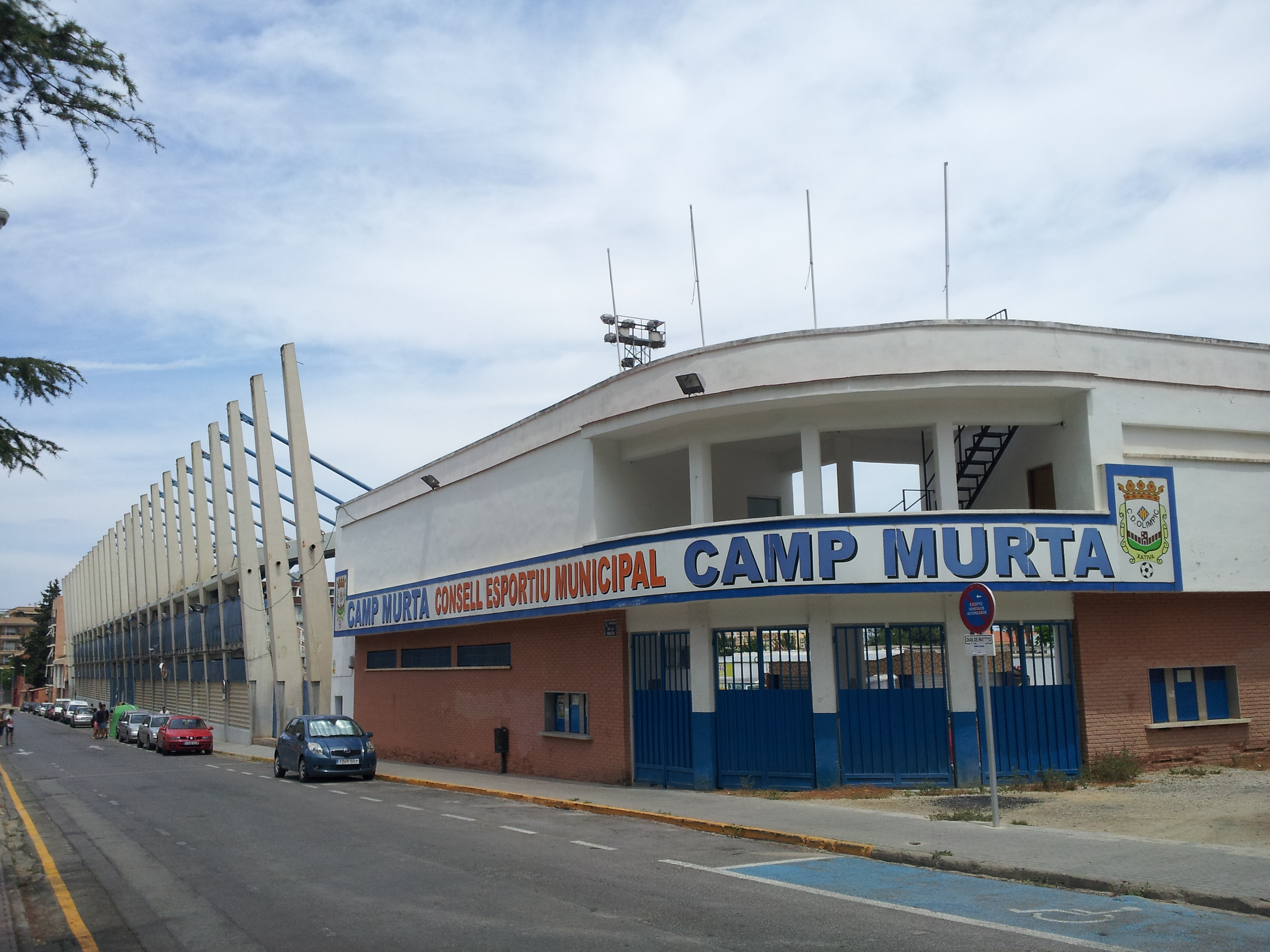
- Interactive map of La Murta
- Full name: Campo de Fútbol La Murta
- Location: Xàtiva, Spain
- Coordinates: 38°59′33″N 0°30′59″W
- Capacity: 9,000
- Surface: Grass
- Field size: 103x66m

Construction
- Opened: 1922

Tenant
- Sudeva Olimpic Residential Academy (1932–)

Campo de Fútbol La Murta is a football stadium in Xàtiva in the autonomous community of Valencia. It has a capacity of 9,000, of which 2,000 are seats. It is the home ground of Sudeva Olimpic Residential Academy who plays in the Tercera División RFEF. The pitch dimensions are 103x63m.

The site has been a football field since the late 1920s or early 1930s and is the only home ground Olimpic has used. Until 1960, the ground was very basic, consisting of a simple uncovered tribune on the east side of the ground and a single step around the pitch. In season 1960/61, leading player Richart was transferred to Sporting de Gijón and it is said that this money was used to build the popular terrace at the north end of the ground. Simple improvements to the terracing occurred during the 1980s, but the next major development was the building of a new covered main stand in 2000. Plastic seats and an electronic scoreboard were added in 2002 and artificial turf was installed in October 2005.
