= AD Almería =

Spanish football club

Almería
- Full name: Agrupación Deportiva Almería
- Nickname: Almerienses
- Founded: 1971; 55 years ago
- Dissolved: 1982; 44 years ago
- Ground: Juan Rojas, Almería, Andalusia, Spain
- Capacity: 13,468
- League: Segunda División
- 1981–82: Segunda División, 18th
Home colours	Away colours

Agrupación Deportiva Almería was a Spanish football club based in Almería, in the autonomous community of Andalusia. Founded in 1971, it held home matches at Estadio Municipal Juan Rojas, with a 13,468-seat capacity.

== History ==
In only two years, AD Almería were promoted from the newly created Segunda División B to La Liga, finishing ninth in their debut season in the latter. The club had been founded just eight years earlier.

In 1982, however, due to severe economic problems, the team was forced to fold, being replaced in the city by CP Almería and, in 1989, by UD Almería, which would also appear in the top flight, in the 2000s.

== Season to season ==
Season	Tier	Division	Place	Copa del Rey
1971–72	4	1ª Reg.	1st	
1972–73	3	3ª	10th	
1973–74	3	3ª	2nd	
1974–75	3	3ª	16th	
1975–76	3	3ª	2nd	
1976–77	3	3ª	3rd	
1977–78	3	2ª B	1st	First round
1978–79	2	2ª	1st	Fourth round
1979–80	1	1ª	10th	Round of 16
1980–81	1	1ª	18th	Third round
1981–82	2	2ª	18th	Second round

- 2 seasons in La Liga
- 2 seasons in Segunda División
- 1 season in Segunda División B
- 5 seasons in Tercera División
