= Vinaròs CF =

Vinaròs
- Full name: Vinaròs Club de Fútbol
- Founded: 1965
- Ground: Campo maestrat, Vinaròs, Valencian Community, Spain
- Capacity: 9,600
- Chairman: (Spain) Chimo Geira
- Manager: (Spain) Javi Prats
- League: Primera FFCV – Group 1
- 2024–25: Primera FFCV – Group 1, 4th of 16
Home colours	Away colours

Vinaròs Club de Fútbol is a football team based in Vinaròs, in Castellón province, autonomous community of Valencian Community, Spain. Founded in 1965, it plays in Primera FFCV – Group 1. Its stadium is El Cervol, which has a capacity of 9,600 seats.

== History ==
Vinaròs Club de Fútbol was founded in 1965. However, in the past, other football clubs from Vinaròs existed. In 1977, was the first team of Castellón province to play in Segunda División B.

== Season to season ==
Season	Tier	Division	Place	Copa del Rey
1965–66	6	3ª Reg.	3rd	
1966–67	6	3ª Reg.	1st	
1967–68	5	2ª Reg.	5th	
1968–69	5	2ª Reg.	6th	
1969–70	5	2ª Reg.	1st	
1970–71	4	Reg. Pref.	6th	
1971–72	4	Reg. Pref.	1st	
1972–73	3	3ª	14th	Third round
1973–74	3	3ª	9th	First round
1974–75	3	3ª	11th	Second round
1975–76	3	3ª	12th	First round
1976–77	3	3ª	7th	First round
1977–78	3	2ª B	12th	First round
1978–79	3	2ª B	19th	First round
1979–80	4	3ª	6th	Second round
1980–81	4	3ª	9th	Second round
1981–82	4	3ª	8th	
1982–83	4	3ª	12th	
1983–84	4	3ª	9th	
1984–85	4	3ª	13th	

Season	Tier	Division	Place	Copa del Rey
1985–86	4	3ª	18th	
1986–87	4	3ª	18th	
1987–88	5	Reg. Pref.	9th	
1988–89	5	Reg. Pref.	3rd	
1989–90	4	3ª	14th	
1990–91	4	3ª	7th	
1991–92	4	3ª	14th	
1992–93	5	Reg. Pref.	5th	
1993–94	5	Reg. Pref.	18th	
1994–95	6	1ª Reg.	5th	
1995–96	6	1ª Reg.	5th	
1996–97	6	1ª Reg.	8th	
1997–98	6	1ª Reg.	1st	
1998–99	5	Reg. Pref.	6th	
1999–2000	5	Reg. Pref.	1st	
2000–01	4	3ª	15th	
2001–02	4	3ª	8th	
2002–03	4	3ª	18th	
2003–04	5	Reg. Pref.	13th	
2004–05	5	Reg. Pref.	6th	

Season	Tier	Division	Place	Copa del Rey
2005–06	5	Reg. Pref.	2nd	
2006–07	5	Reg. Pref.	12th	
2007–08	5	Reg. Pref.	6th	
2008–09	5	Reg. Pref.	13th	
2009–10	5	Reg. Pref.	16th	
2010–11	6	1ª Reg.	1st	
2011–12	5	Reg. Pref.	12th	
2012–13	5	Reg. Pref.	6th	
2013–14	5	Reg. Pref.	7th	
2014–15	5	Reg. Pref.	6th	
2015–16	5	Reg. Pref.	18th	
2016–17	6	1ª Reg.	16th	
2017–18	7	2ª Reg.	2nd	
2018–19	6	1ª Reg.	8th	
2019–20	6	1ª Reg.	8th	
2020–21	6	1ª Reg.	2nd	
2021–22	6	Reg. Pref.	10th	
2022–23	6	Reg. Pref.	12th	
2023–24	7	1ª FFCV	8th	
2024–25	7	1ª FFCV	4th	
2025–26	7	1ª FFCV	6th	
2026–27	7	1ª FFCV		

- 2 seasons in Segunda División B
- 19 seasons in Tercera División

== Notable former players ==
- (Spain) Edu Caballer
- (Spain) Jordi Pablo Ripollés
- (Spain) Xisco Nadal
- (Romania) Florin Andone

== Notable former coaches ==
- (Spain) Vicente Piquer
- (Spain) Vicente Dauder
