= 1978–79 Segunda División =

48th season of the second-tier football league in Spain

Segunda División
- Season: 1978–79
- Dates: 3 September 1978 – 10 June 1979
- Champions: AD Almería (1st title)
- Promoted: CD Málaga; Betis
- Relegated: Jaén; Terrassa; Baracaldo; Racing Ferrol
- Matches: 380
- Goals: 914 (2.41 per match)
- Top goalscorer: Patxi Iriguíbel (23 goals)

The 1978–79 Segunda División season saw 20 teams participate in the second flight Spanish league. AD Almería won the league. Almería, CD Málaga and Real Betis were promoted to Primera División. Real Jaén, Terrassa FC, Barakaldo CF and Racing de Ferrol were relegated to Segunda División B.

== Teams ==
Location of teams in Segunda División 1978-79

Club	City	Stadium
Alavés	Vitoria	Mendizorrotza
Algeciras	Algeciras	El Mirador
Almería	Almería	Antonio Franco Navarro
Barakaldo	Barakaldo	Lasesarre
Betis	Seville	Benito Villamarín
Cádiz	Cádiz	Ramón de Carranza
Castellón	Castellón de la Plana	Castalia
Castilla	Madrid	Ciudad Deportiva
Deportivo La Coruña	La Coruña	Riazor
Elche	Elche	Martínez Valero
Getafe Deportivo	Getafe	Las Margaritas
Granada	Granada	Los Cármenes
Jaén	Jaén	La Victoria
Málaga	Málaga	La Rosaleda
Murcia	Murcia	La Condomina
Osasuna	Pamplona	El Sadar
Racing Ferrol	Ferrol	Manuel Rivera
Sabadell	Sabadell	Nova Creu Alta
Terrassa	Terrassa	Olímpic de Terrassa
Real Valladolid	Valladolid	José Zorrilla

== Final table ==
Pos	Team	Pld	W	D	L	GF	GA	GD	Pts	Promotion or relegation
1	AD Almería	38	21	5	12	62	44	+18	47	Promoted to Primera División
2	CD Málaga	38	19	9	10	47	27	+20	47	Promoted to Primera División
3	Real Betis	38	18	10	10	58	35	+23	46	Promoted to Primera División
4	Real Valladolid	38	20	6	12	47	32	+15	46	
5	Elche CF	38	16	13	9	50	31	+19	45	
6	Granada CF	38	16	12	10	46	34	+12	44	
7	Castilla CF	38	18	6	14	55	45	+10	42	
8	Cádiz CF	38	15	11	12	52	47	+5	41	
9	Deportivo Alavés	38	15	10	13	45	31	+14	40	
10	Getafe Deportivo	38	17	6	15	57	56	+1	40	
11	CD Castellón	38	12	14	12	48	43	+5	38	
12	CE Sabadell FC	38	12	13	13	50	49	+1	37	
13	CA Osasuna	38	15	7	16	51	51	0	37	
14	Real Murcia	38	12	11	15	35	52	−17	35	
15	Deportivo de La Coruña	38	13	9	16	43	45	−2	35	
16	Algeciras CF	38	13	8	17	40	53	−13	34	
17	Real Jaén	38	12	10	16	41	55	−14	34	Relegated to Segunda Divisiόn B
18	Terrassa FC	38	9	11	18	34	51	−17	29	Relegated to Segunda Divisiόn B
19	Barakaldo CF	38	10	8	20	31	53	−22	28	Relegated to Segunda Divisiόn B
20	Racing de Ferrol	38	4	7	27	22	80	−58	15	Relegated to Segunda Divisiόn B

Source: BDFutbol

== Results ==
Home \ Away	ALV	ALG	ALM	BAK	BET	CÁD	CAS	CST	DEP	ELC	GET	GRA	JAÉ	MGA	MUR	OSA	RFE	SAB	TER	VLD
Alavés	—	2–0	2–0	2–0	5–2	1–0	1–1	1–0	1–0	0–0	2–0	1–0	4–0	2–0	0–0	1–0	4–1	2–1	0–1	1–2
Algeciras	2–1	—	2–1	1–0	0–0	1–1	1–1	3–0	2–1	0–3	2–0	1–0	3–0	1–0	0–1	2–2	2–0	0–2	1–0	1–0
Almería	3–1	2–1	—	2–0	2–1	1–1	3–0	2–1	2–1	2–0	3–1	2–0	2–1	3–0	3–1	3–0	1–0	2–2	3–0	2–1
Barakaldo	0–0	1–0	0–1	—	1–0	0–5	0–0	1–1	0–0	0–0	2–0	3–1	0–0	0–1	4–0	3–0	1–1	1–0	1–0	2–0
Betis	1–0	4–1	4–0	4–0	—	0–0	2–1	5–0	2–1	0–0	2–2	2–1	1–0	2–1	3–0	0–0	3–1	5–1	1–2	1–0
Cádiz	1–1	1–2	1–0	5–4	1–2	—	3–2	0–0	1–0	2–1	2–1	0–0	1–0	1–1	2–0	3–1	2–1	3–1	0–0	0–0
Castellón	0–0	0–0	3–0	3–0	3–2	3–2	—	4–1	2–0	1–1	1–3	1–1	4–2	0–0	3–1	1–0	3–0	0–0	3–0	0–1
Castilla	1–0	1–0	4–3	2–0	1–3	3–2	0–1	—	1–0	2–1	1–0	0–0	1–1	0–1	4–0	2–0	7–0	3–1	2–0	1–0
Deportivo	1–1	5–1	0–0	1–0	0–0	4–1	2–0	3–5	—	0–0	3–0	0–3	2–1	1–1	0–0	4–1	2–1	2–0	1–0	2–0
Elche	1–4	5–1	3–0	2–0	0–0	3–0	2–0	2–1	0–1	—	1–1	0–0	2–0	2–1	1–0	3–0	2–2	3–1	1–0	2–0
Getafe	2–1	4–2	1–0	3–0	0–0	4–1	2–2	3–1	2–1	1–1	—	2–1	2–0	0–3	1–1	2–1	5–0	2–1	2–0	2–1
Granada	1–0	2–1	3–1	2–1	1–0	1–0	0–0	2–2	1–1	1–0	5–0	—	0–0	2–1	3–0	2–0	1–0	3–1	1–1	2–0
Jaén	1–0	1–0	2–2	3–0	2–2	2–3	1–0	1–0	1–0	1–0	3–2	0–0	—	0–0	1–1	4–2	3–0	0–1	1–1	3–1
Málaga	2–0	2–0	0–0	2–1	3–0	2–0	2–0	2–1	3–0	2–0	2–0	2–0	3–0	—	1–0	1–0	1–0	1–1	0–0	0–0
Murcia	2–2	3–2	1–4	2–1	0–0	2–1	1–1	0–1	1–0	1–1	1–0	2–2	1–1	2–1	—	2–0	0–0	0–2	2–0	4–2
Osasuna	1–1	3–2	1–0	3–1	3–1	2–0	1–1	1–0	4–0	2–0	2–1	2–0	4–2	3–2	0–1	—	4–0	1–1	3–0	0–0
R. Ferrol	1–0	0–0	0–2	1–2	0–2	0–4	2–1	0–1	2–2	1–1	1–3	0–1	4–0	0–1	0–1	1–0	—	0–0	0–1	0–1
Sabadell	1–1	2–2	2–1	2–0	0–1	1–1	2–0	1–4	0–1	3–3	4–2	1–1	4–0	1–0	3–1	2–0	3–0	—	1–1	1–1
Terrassa	1–0	0–0	1–3	1–1	1–0	0–1	1–1	0–0	4–1	0–2	0–1	4–2	0–2	2–2	1–0	2–4	6–1	0–0	—	2–5
Valladolid	1–0	2–0	2–1	2–0	1–0	0–0	3–1	1–0	1–0	0–1	2–0	2–0	2–1	2–0	1–0	0–0	7–1	1–0	2–1	—

Source: BDFutbol
Legend: Blue = home team win; Yellow = draw; Red = away team win.

== Pichichi Trophy for top goalscorers ==
Goalscorers	Goals	Team
(Spain) Patxi Iriguíbel	23	Osasuna
(Spain) José Luis	19	Granada
(Uruguay) Hugo Cabezas	17	Betis
