= Estadio Colombino =

Multi-use stadium in Huelva, Spain

Coordinates: 37.258855°N 6.93704°W

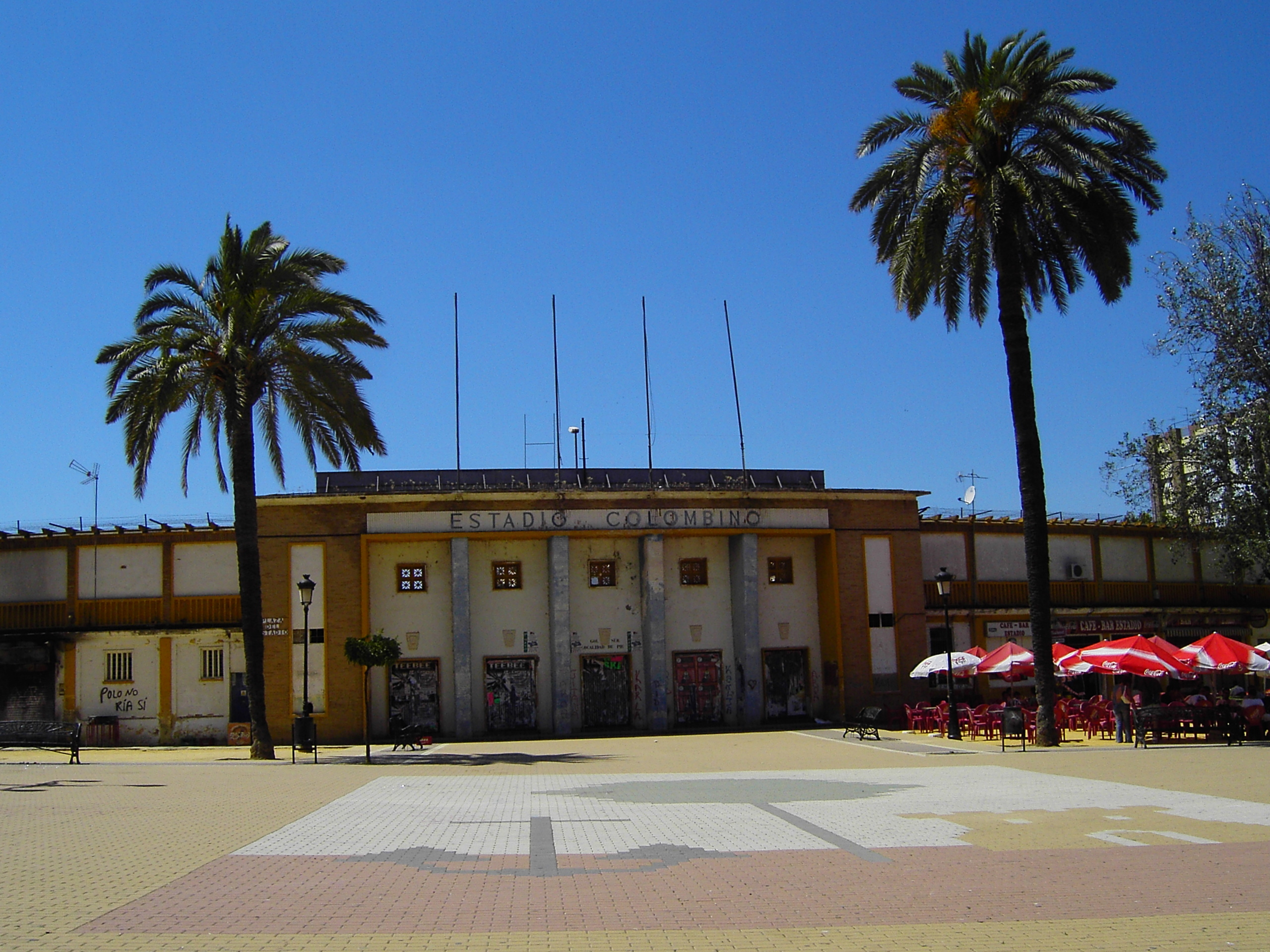
- Main façade in 2007
- Interactive map of Estadio Colombino
- Full name: Estadio Colombino
- Location: Huelva, Spain
- Owner: Recreativo de Huelva
- Operator: Recreativo de Huelva
- Capacity: 13,000

Construction
- Opened: 1957
- Closed: 2001
- Demolished: 2008

Tenant
- Recreativo de Huelva

Estadio Colombino was a multi-use stadium in Huelva, Spain. It was initially used as the stadium for Recreativo de Huelva matches. It was replaced by Estadio Nuevo Colombino in 2001. The capacity of the stadium was 13,000 spectators.

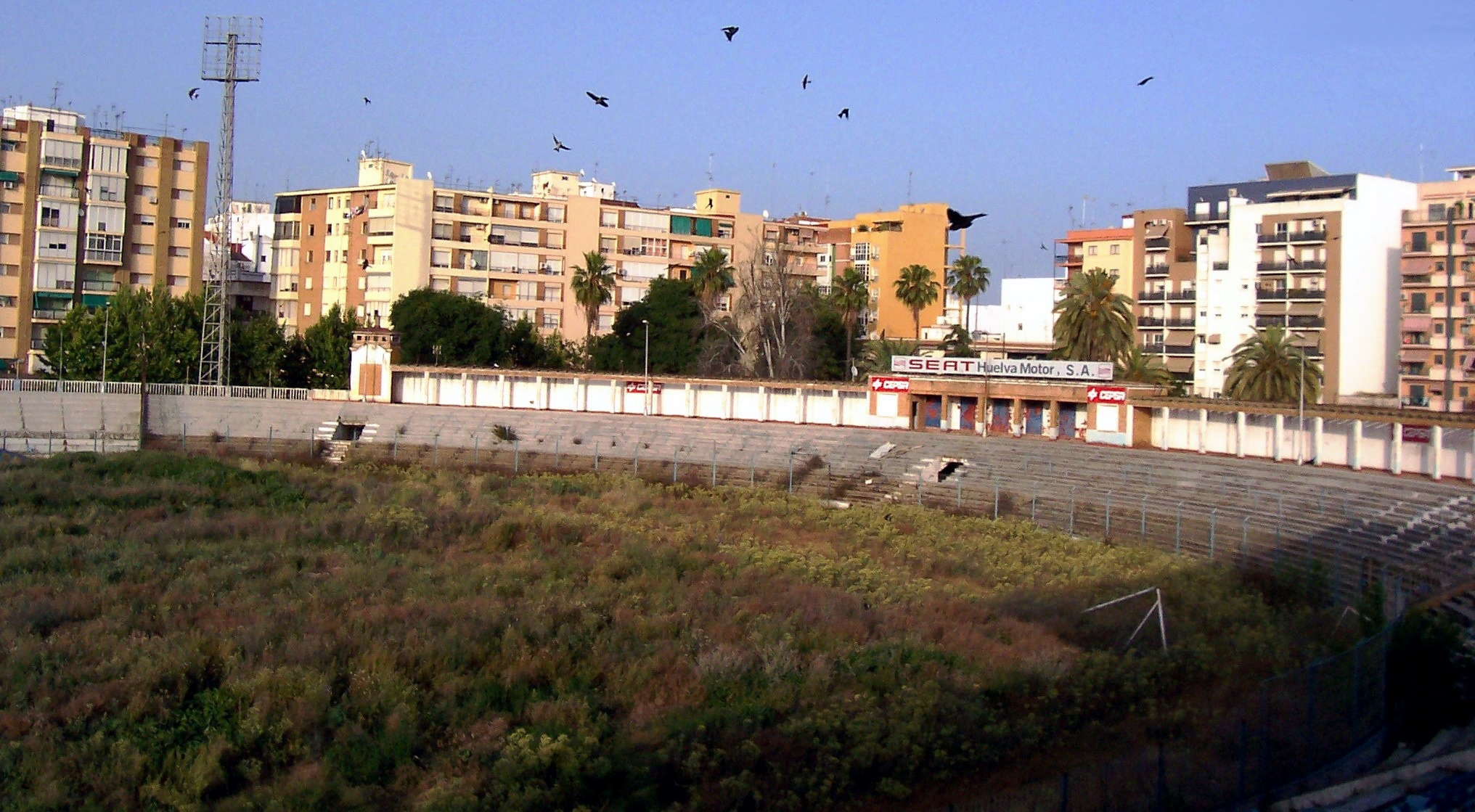
The stadium in 2007
