= Oscar Fulloné =

Argentine football coach (1939–2017)

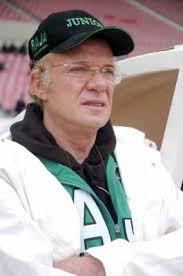

Personal information
- Full name: Luis Oscar Fulloné Arce
- Date of birth: 4 April 1939
- Place of birth: La Plata, Argentina
- Date of death: 22 May 2017 (aged 78)
- Place of death: Casablanca, Morocco
- Position: Midfielder

Youth career
- Estudiantes de La Plata

Senior career*
Years	Team	Apps	(Gls)
?	Independiente Medellín		
1962	Orión	1	(0)
1963–1964	Real Oviedo	0	(0)
1968–1969	Aston Villa	0	(0)

Managerial career
- 1980–1981: FC Sion
- ?–1998: ASEC Mimosas
- 1998–2000: Raja Casablanca
- 2000: Al-Ahly (Tripoli)
- 2000: Al Ain
- 2000–2001: Al-Masry
- 2001–2002: Burkina Faso
- 2002–2003: Wydad Casablanca
- 2003: Mamelodi Sundowns
- 2004: Espérance Sportive de Tunis
- ?–2006: Raja Casablanca
- 2007: Maghreb Fez
- 2007: Al-Ittihad (Aleppo)
- 2008: Wydad Casablanca
- 2008–2009: USM Alger
- 2009–2010: KAC Kenitra
- * Club domestic league appearances and goals

Luis Oscar Fulloné Arce, better known as Oscar Fulloné (4 April 1939 – 22 May 2017) was an Argentine football coach and player. He played as a midfielder for Independiente Medellín and Orión before moving to England to play for Aston Villa in 1967. Known as Oscar Arce during his time in England he returned to the country following his retirement from playing and was a coach for both Sheffield United and Sunderland. He became manager of Swiss side FC Sion in 1980 before going on to become one of the most successful African club managers.

== Playing career ==
Born in La Plata, Fulloné started his career with Estudiantes in Argentina, then Independiente Medellín in Colombia, before travelling to play for Orión in Costa Rica. He arrived in a sickly state and played only one game in September 1962, being sent-off after 20 minutes. He was subsequently sacked and deported for agitation and proselytizing for the Costa Rican Communist Party. The circumstances made him the most expensive signing in Costa Rican history.

He had married a Scottish girl who was on holiday in South America and they had a child. While out of contract he trained with Peñarol before setting off for Spain in 1963. He was lucky to survive when his transport, the S.S. Ciudad de Asunción, was shipwrecked in Mar del Plata leaving him clinging to the wreckage for hours. He reached Spain in the summer of 1963 and, through agent Alfonso Aparicio, joined Real Oviedo under Enrique Orizaola. The club had been experiencing financial difficulties and had recently lost key players Sánchez Lage, Paquito García and José María.

Fulloné was selected for the opening game before a large crowd at San Gregorio field but withdrew before the match claiming a pulled semitendinosus muscle. The physio was not convinced instead blaming the trauma of the sinking. The weeks became a month. Fulloné recovered but was not being selected. Aware of his Costa Rican activities, the repressive regime of Franco's Spain would ensure he never would be. They refused the Spanish Football Federation permission to register the player. The club reneged on paying Fulloné despite there being a valid two-year contract for 200,000 pesetas annually.

In 1966, he was to join Australian club APIA. The Australian media reported that his arrival had been delayed due to his wife requiring a visa to travel to Australia however he never ended up arriving. He claimed to be playing for AS Monaco but the Australian weekly newspaper, Soccer World fact-checked the team-sheets to confirm this was inaccurate.

Fulloné moved to the UK with his family. In 1967, he was briefly on the books of the Scottish club Albion Rovers, and had a pre-season trial with Waterford of the Republic of Ireland. In the match, against Leeds United, Fullone fouled Billy Bremner to concede a penalty, allowing Johnny Giles to score his second goal before half-time. The Argentinian was substituted at the break. The Waterford News & Star surmised "Fullone proved something of an upset, certainly more to his own players than to the opposition."

In July 1968, he joined Aston Villa of England. He reportedly contacted Aston Villa "out of the blue" and joined them upon the completion of a two-year UK residential qualification. An article about his signing in the Sports Argus newspaper described him as a "wizard at ball control and "banana" type free kicks". He made his debut during pre-season alongside his younger brother, Hector, who played as an amateur while on a visit to England. After an injury-hit eight months with the club during which he played nine times for the reserve team, but never for the first team, he was released from his contract in January 1969. It was reported the following month that he had relocated to Scotland in the hope of signing with a club there.

== Coaching and managerial career ==
After retiring as a player, Fulloné became a football coach. He returned to Argentina working at Estudiantes before returning to Europe to manage the Norwegian club, Sogndal Fotball.

He was appointed as youth team manager at Millwall in September 1977, reportedly turning down the opportunity to manage El Salvador at the 1977 CONCACAF Championship. He was youth-team coach at Sheffield United between May 1978 and 1979 when the club tried to sign Argentinian international Diego Maradona but ultimately ended up signing Alejandro Sabella instead. Fulloné was also involved in the transfer of Argentinian World Cup winners Ricardo Villa and Osvaldo Ardiles to Tottenham Hotspur. In October 1979 Fulloné was dramatically sacked as Sunderland chief scout by manager Ken Knighton. Brazilian forward Alves Gil was supposed to guest for the Rokermen but had been left stranded in London.

=== Early managerial career ===
Fulloné's managerial career began in Switzerland where he served as manager of Swiss side FC Sion between 1980 and 1981.

Fulloné moved to the Ivory Coast as a technical adviser to the national team before joining ASEC Mimosas in 1982. During his time at the club, Mimosas won the Coupe de Côte d'Ivoire and Coupe Houphouët-Boigny in 1983. He left Mimosas in 1984.

=== Success in Africa ===
Fulloné returned to Mimosas in 1997 and won the CAF Champions League in 1998.

In 1998, Fulloné joined Raja Casablanca of Morocco, winning the CAF Champions League in 1999, although he did not travel to the final due to illness. He left the club in 2000.

=== Later career ===
After he left Raja, Fulloné's subsequent career consisted of a series of very brief spells managing different teams. In June 2000, he joined Emirati club Al Ain, leaving in October 2000 after a defeat by Persepolis in the Asian Club Championship. He also managed Libyan team Al-Ahly, where he was assisted by fellow Argentine Miguel Ángel Gamondi.

Fulloné was appointed manager of the Burkina Faso national team in September 2001, but after his wife was hospitalised with cancer he went back to France the following month and never returned. He was still officially in the post until a week out from the 2002 African Cup of Nations when the Burkinabé information minister announced that Fulloné was no longer in charge of the national team.

Fulloné next joined Wydad Casablanca in September 2002, where he won the African Cup Winners' Cup in 2002. He was nominated by CAF for Africa-based coach of the year but lost out to Bruno Metsu. He left Wydad in February 2003.

In May 2003, Fulloné was signed by Mamelodi Sundowns in South Africa with the club president Patrice Motsepe personally funding Fulloné's contract. In September he threatened to resign if his team did not improve. After a poor start to the season, he was replaced and moved to a technical director role.

In January 2004, he was appointed manager of Espérance Sportive de Tunis in Tunisia. He was sacked in September 2004 after Espérance lost their opening two matches of the 2004–05 Tunisian Ligue Professionnelle 1.

He returned for a second spell with Raja Casablanca in December 2005. He was sacked in November 2006.

He took over as manager of Maghreb Fez in Morocco in August 2007. A short stint with Al Ittihad in Syria ended in December 2007, when he was sacked. He later had another spell in charge of Wydad Casablanca, leaving the club in June 2008. He moved on to USM Alger in Algeria, but was sacked again in January 2009 after the team were knocked out of the Algerian Cup by a lower division team.

Fulloné's final role in management was with Kénitra AC, where he was in charge from December 2009 until December 2010 when he left the club by mutual agreement.

== Later life ==
In his final years, he worked as a radio commentator in Morocco.

He died in May 2017, at the age of 78, in Morocco.

== Honours ==
=== Manager ===
ASEC Mimosas

- Coupe de Côte d'Ivoire: 1983, 1997
- Coupe Houphouët-Boigny: 1983
- Ligue 1: 1997
- CAF Champions League: 1998

Raja Casablanca

- CAF Champions League: 1999

Wydad Casablanca

- African Cup Winners' Cup: 2002
