= 1971–72 Segunda División =

41st season of the second-tier football league in Spain

Segunda División
- Season: 1971–72
- Champions: Oviedo
- Promoted: Oviedo; Castellón; Zaragoza
- Relegated: Villarreal; Ferrol; Xerez; Langreo
- Matches: 380
- Goals: 801 (2.11 per match)
- Top goalscorer: Enrique Galán (23 goals)
- Best goalkeeper: Alfredo Lombardía (0.5 goals/match)
- Biggest home win: Cultural Leonesa 5–0 Cádiz (17 October 1971); Hércules 5–0 San Andrés (31 October 1971); San Andrés 5–0 Logroñés (7 May 1972)
- Biggest away win: Ferrol 0–4 Elche (10 October 1971)
- Highest scoring: Valladolid 6–2 Cultural Leonesa (10 October 1971)

The 1971–72 Segunda División season was the 41st since its establishment and was played between 4 September 1971 and 1 June 1972. Real Betis won the league.

== Overview before the season ==
20 teams joined the league, including two relegated from the 1970–71 La Liga and 5 promoted from the 1970–71 Tercera División.

Relegated from La Liga

- Elche
- Zaragoza

Promoted from Tercera División

- Cultural Leonesa
- Tenerife
- Mestalla
- Xerez
- Valladolid

== Teams ==
Location of teams in Segunda División 1971-72
Canary Islands

Club	City	Stadium
Cádiz	Cádiz	Ramón de Carranza
Castellón	Castellón de la Plana	Castalia
Cultural Leonesa	León	Antonio Amilivia
Elche	Elche	Altabix
Ferrol	Ferrol	Manuel Rivera
Hércules	Alicante	La Viña
Langreo	Langreo	Ganzábal
Logroñés	Logroño	Las Gaunas
Mallorca	Palma de Mallorca	Luis Sitjar
Mestalla	Valencia	Mestalla
Oviedo	Oviedo	Carlos Tartiere
Pontevedra	Pontevedra	Pasarón
Rayo Vallecano	Madrid	Vallecas
San Andrés	Barcelona	Calle Santa Coloma
Real Santander	Santander	El Sardinero
Tenerife	Santa Cruz de Tenerife	Heliodoro Rodríguez López
Real Valladolid	Valladolid	José Zorrilla
Villarreal	Villarreal	El Madrigal
Xerez	Jerez de la Frontera	Domecq
Zaragoza	Zaragoza	La Romareda

== League table ==
Pos	Team	Pld	W	D	L	GF	GA	GD	Pts	Promotion, qualification or relegation
1	Oviedo (P)	38	21	9	8	40	19	+21	51	Promotion to La Liga
2	Castellón (P)	38	21	8	9	50	29	+21	50 (Note: Castellón finished ahead of Zaragoza on head-to-head points: Castellón–Zaragoza 5–1, Zaragoza–Castellón 1–1)	Promotion to La Liga
3	Zaragoza (P)	38	21	8	9	66	31	+35	50	Promotion to La Liga
4	Elche	38	20	9	9	47	21	+26	49	
5	Cultural Leonesa	38	18	6	14	55	53	+2	42	
6	Logroñés	38	16	9	13	39	36	+3	41	
7	Valladolid	38	16	7	15	50	45	+5	39 (Note: Valladolid finished ahead of Rayo Vallecano on overall goal difference)	
8	Rayo Vallecano	38	14	11	13	37	40	−3	39	
9	Tenerife	38	14	10	14	48	33	+15	38 (Note: Tenerife finished ahead of San Andrés on head-to-head goal difference: San Andrés–Tenerife 1–0, Tenerife–San Andrés 4–1)	
10	San Andrés	38	15	8	15	36	33	+3	38	
11	Pontevedra	38	13	10	15	38	45	−7	36 (Note: Pontevedra finished ahead of Mallorca on head-to-head points: Mallorca–Pontevedra 0–1, Pontevedra–Mallorca 1–1)	
12	Mallorca	38	11	14	13	25	33	−8	36	
13	Mestalla (O)	38	11	12	15	31	47	−16	34 (Note: Mestalla finished ahead of Hércules, Real Santander and Cádiz on head-to-head points: Mestalla 8 pts, Hércules 7 pts, Real Santander 6 pts, Cádiz 3 pts)	Qualification for the relegation playoffs
14	Hércules (O)	38	13	8	17	43	40	+3	34	Qualification for the relegation playoffs
15	Real Santander (O)	38	14	6	18	33	45	−12	34	Qualification for the relegation playoffs
16	Cádiz (O)	38	14	6	18	38	43	−5	34	Qualification for the relegation playoffs
17	Villarreal (R)	38	10	12	16	30	48	−18	32	Relegation to Tercera División
18	Ferrol (R)	38	10	9	19	31	58	−27	29	Relegation to Tercera División
19	Xerez (R)	38	6	15	17	26	49	−23	27 (Note: Xerez finished ahead of Langreo on head-to-head points: Langreo–Xerez 0–0, Xerez–Langreo 2–1)	Relegation to Tercera División
20	Langreo (R)	38	11	5	22	38	53	−15	27	Relegation to Tercera División

Source: BDFútbol
Rules for classification: 1) points; 2) head-to-head points; 3) head-to-head goal difference; 4) goal difference; 5) number of goals scored
(O) Play-off winners; (P) Promoted; (R) Relegated

=== Top goalscorers ===
Goalscorers	Goals	Team
(Spain) Enrique Galán	23	Oviedo
(Spain) Alfonso Melenchón	20	Elche
(Spain) Javier Galdós	17	Zaragoza
(Spain) Marianín	17	Cultural Leonesa
(Spain) Machicha	17	Cádiz

=== Top goalkeepers ===
Goalkeeper	Goals	Matches	Average	Team
(Spain) Alfredo Lombardía	19	38	0.5	Oviedo
(Spain) Pere Valentí Mora	21	38	0.55	Elche
(Spain) Manuel Villanova	19	31	0.61	Zaragoza
(Spain) Ismael Comas	20	29	0.69	San Andrés
(Spain) José del Castillo	16	22	0.73	Tenerife

== Results ==
Home \ Away	CÁD	CAS	CUL	ELC	FER	HÉR	LAN	LOG	MLL	MES	OVI	PON	RAY	SAN	SAT	TEN	VLD	VIL	XER	ZAR
Cádiz	—	2–0	0–0	3–1	1–0	4–0	4–0	5–1	2–1	1–1	1–2	1–0	0–0	2–0	0–1	2–2	0–1	1–0	0–0	2–1
Castellón	1–0	—	2–0	0–0	1–1	1–0	1–0	1–0	2–0	3–1	1–0	4–0	1–0	1–0	2–1	2–1	2–0	0–2	3–0	5–1
Cultural Leonesa	5–0	3–1	—	1–0	4–1	2–1	3–0	1–0	1–0	2–1	1–3	2–2	2–0	1–0	2–0	2–1	2–1	4–2	3–1	3–3
Elche	1–0	2–0	2–0	—	2–0	2–0	3–0	2–1	0–0	1–0	0–0	3–0	3–0	2–0	3–0	1–0	1–0	2–0	2–1	1–0
Ferrol	1–0	0–2	0–3	0–4	—	0–0	1–0	1–1	0–0	1–1	1–0	1–0	1–2	1–1	2–0	0–2	3–1	0–0	2–1	1–1
Hércules	2–0	2–1	4–1	0–1	1–2	—	3–1	0–0	0–0	4–0	0–1	1–1	1–3	2–0	5–0	1–1	1–0	3–0	1–0	1–1
Langreo	1–2	2–0	4–0	1–1	2–3	0–1	—	3–1	2–0	4–0	1–1	1–2	1–1	2–0	1–0	1–1	0–1	4–0	0–0	0–1
Logroñés	1–0	2–0	2–0	1–0	2–0	0–3	3–0	—	1–0	1–1	0–0	1–0	1–1	1–0	2–1	2–1	1–0	2–0	3–0	1–2
Mallorca	0–0	1–1	1–0	0–0	1–1	2–0	1–0	1–1	—	1–0	1–0	0–1	0–1	0–0	2–1	1–0	3–2	0–1	1–0	1–0
Mestalla	1–0	0–0	1–0	0–2	2–0	0–0	2–0	2–5	0–0	—	0–1	1–1	1–2	2–0	2–1	1–0	2–0	0–0	1–0	0–0
Oviedo	2–0	0–0	0–0	1–0	3–0	1–0	2–0	1–0	3–0	2–0	—	2–0	1–0	1–0	3–0	2–1	0–0	1–0	2–1	1–1
Pontevedra	2–0	0–1	0–1	1–1	0–1	2–1	1–2	1–0	1–1	0–0	2–0	—	3–0	0–2	1–0	1–0	2–2	2–0	2–2	1–0
Rayo Vallecano	0–1	1–4	2–0	2–1	3–2	1–0	2–0	0–0	1–0	1–1	0–2	1–3	—	1–0	2–0	0–0	0–0	0–0	2–0	0–1
San Andrés	1–2	1–1	2–1	0–0	3–0	2–1	3–1	5–0	1–0	3–1	1–0	2–0	1–0	—	1–2	1–0	1–0	0–0	2–1	1–1
Real Santander	2–1	0–1	1–1	0–0	1–0	1–0	1–0	1–0	2–2	0–1	3–1	1–1	1–0	1–0	—	4–1	4–0	0–0	0–1	1–0
Tenerife	2–0	2–0	3–0	1–0	2–0	3–0	0–1	0–0	0–0	2–0	2–0	2–0	2–2	4–1	1–2	—	2–1	3–0	3–0	0–1
Valladolid	2–1	3–2	6–2	2–1	3–1	3–1	2–0	0–2	4–1	3–1	2–0	0–1	1–1	1–0	2–0	1–1	—	2–0	1–1	1–0
Villarreal	1–0	0–0	3–1	2–1	2–1	1–1	1–2	1–0	1–3	1–3	0–0	3–0	2–2	0–1	0–0	0–0	1–0	—	4–0	0–3
Xerez	3–0	0–2	0–0	1–1	3–1	0–1	2–1	0–0	0–0	1–1	0–0	1–1	0–3	0–0	1–0	1–1	1–1	2–2	—	1–0
Zaragoza	4–0	1–1	3–1	3–0	3–1	2–1	3–0	2–0	3–0	4–0	0–1	4–3	3–0	0–0	3–0	2–1	3–1	4–0	2–0	—

Source: BDFutbol
Legend: Blue = home team win; Yellow = draw; Red = away team win.

== Relegation playoffs ==
=== First leg ===
10 June 1972	Sestao	1–2	Cádiz	Sestao
	Martínez 20'	Report	Baena 14'; Machicha 23' (pen.)	Stadium: Las Llanas; Referee: Bobé Frías

11 June 1972	Real Santander	2–0	Salamanca	Santander
	Chinchurreta 8', 55'	Report		Stadium: El Sardinero; Referee: Serrano Belenguer

11 June 1972	Mestalla	4–1	Tarrasa	Valencia
	Vega 4', 23'; Lis 50', 88'	Report	Pons 85'	Stadium: Mestalla; Referee: López Montenegro

18 June 1972	Hércules	3–1	Cartagena	Alicante
	Santamaría 24'; Sarrachini 51'; Baena 79'	Report	Mendoza 70'	Stadium: La Viña; Referee: Juango

=== Second leg ===
18 June 1972	Cádiz	2–2 (4–3 agg.)	Sestao	Cádiz
	Otiñano 20'; Machicha 34'	Report	Baños 43', 59'	Stadium: Ramón de Carranza; Referee: Campillo Llor

18 June 1972	Salamanca	0–1 (0–3 agg.)	Real Santander	Salamanca
		Report	Chinchurreta 35'	Stadium: Helmántico; Referee: De Andrés Barragán

18 June 1972	Tarrasa	1–0 (2–4 agg.)	Mestalla	Terrassa
	Trullás 30'	Report		Stadium: Municipal; Referee: Melero Guaza

25 June 1972	Cartagena	1–1 (2–4 agg.)	Hércules	Cartagena
	Climent 32'	Report	Baena 66'	Stadium: El Almarjal; Referee: Herencia Jurado
