= Oscar Álvarez =

Oscar Álvarez may refer to:

- Óscar Álvarez (footballer, born 1902) (1902–1972), Spanish footballer
- Óscar Álvarez (footballer, born 1948) (1948–2016), Argentine football striker
- Óscar Álvarez (cyclist) (born 1977), Colombian road cyclist
- Óscar Álvarez (footballer, born 1977), Spanish football manager and former centre-back
- Óscar David Álvarez (born 1983), Colombian professional golfer
- Oscar Álvarez (politician), Honduras Nationalist politician
