= Dieguito =

Dieguito is a given name or nickname, meaning "Little Diego". Notable people with the name include:

- Dieguito (footballer, born 1983), Spanish footballer
- Dieguito (footballer, born 1989), Spanish footballer
- Dieguito (footballer, born 2005), Spanish footballer
