= 1970–71 Segunda División =

40th season of the second-tier football league in Spain

Segunda División
- Season: 1970–71
- Champions: Real Betis
- Promoted: Real Betis; Burgos; Deportivo La Coruña; Córdoba
- Relegated: Onteniente; Calvo Sotelo; Moscardó
- Matches: 380
- Goals: 791 (2.08 per match)
- Top goalscorer: Santillana (16 goals)
- Best goalkeeper: Manuel Campos (0.75 goals/match)
- Biggest home win: Rayo Vallecano 6–0 Cádiz (30 May 1971)
- Biggest away win: Moscardó 0–3 Rayo Vallecano (6 September 1970)
- Highest scoring: Oviedo 6–1 Ferrol (22 November 1970)

The 1970–71 Segunda División season was the 40th since its establishment and was played between 5 September 1970 and 6 June 1971.

== Overview before the season ==
20 teams joined the league, including 3 relegated from the 1969–70 La Liga and 7 promoted from the 1969–70 Tercera División.

Relegated from La Liga

- Deportivo La Coruña
- Mallorca
- Pontevedra

Promoted from Tercera División

- Langreo
- Real Santander
- Logroñés
- Villarreal
- Hércules
- Cádiz
- Moscardó

== Teams ==
Location of teams in Segunda División 1970-71

Club	City	Stadium
Betis	Seville	Benito Villamarín
Burgos	Burgos	El Plantío
Cádiz	Cádiz	Ramón de Carranza
Calvo Sotelo	Puertollano	Calvo Sotelo
Castellón	Castelló de la Plana	Castalia
Córdoba	Córdoba	El Árcangel
Deportivo de La Coruña	La Coruña	Riazor
Ferrol	Ferrol	Manuel Rivera
Hércules	Alicante	La Viña
Langreo	Langreo	Ganzábal
Logroñés	Logroño	Las Gaunas
Mallorca	Palma de Mallorca	Luis Sitjar
Moscardó	Madrid	Román Valero
Onteniente	Ontinyent	El Clariano
Oviedo	Oviedo	Carlos Tartiere
Pontevedra	Pontevedra	Pasarón
Rayo Vallecano	Madrid	Vallecas
San Andrés	Barcelona	Calle Santa Coloma
Real Santander	Santander	El Sardinero
Villarreal	Villarreal	El Madrigal

== League table ==
Pos	Team	Pld	W	D	L	GF	GA	GD	Pts	Promotion, qualification or relegation
1	Real Betis (P)	38	20	13	5	54	28	+26	53	Promotion to La Liga
2	Burgos (P)	38	19	7	12	46	30	+16	45 (Note: Burgos finished ahead of Deportivo La Coruña, Córdoba and Rayo Vallecano on head-to-head points: Burgos 8 pts, Deportivo La Coruña 8 pts, Córdoba 5 pts, Rayo Vallecano 3 pts. Burgos finished ahead of Deportivo La Coruña on head-to-head goal difference: Burgos–Deportivo La Coruña 3–1, Deportivo La Coruña–Burgos 2–1)	Promotion to La Liga
3	Deportivo La Coruña (P)	38	18	9	11	44	32	+12	45	Promotion to La Liga
4	Córdoba (P)	38	17	11	10	50	30	+20	45	Promotion to La Liga
5	Rayo Vallecano	38	18	9	11	51	29	+22	45	
6	Castellón	38	16	11	11	40	31	+9	43	
7	San Andrés	38	14	12	12	34	36	−2	40 (Note: San Andrés finished ahead of Ferrol, Mallorca and Pontevedra on head-to-head points: San Andrés 8 pts, Ferrol 6 pts, Mallorca 6 pts, Pontevedra 4 pts. Ferrol finished ahead of Mallorca on head-to-head points: Mallorca–Ferrol 1–1, Ferrol–Mallorca 2–0)	
8	Ferrol	38	16	8	14	39	43	−4	40	
9	Mallorca	38	12	16	10	43	35	+8	40	
10	Pontevedra	38	15	10	13	44	41	+3	40	
11	Hércules	38	13	11	14	39	48	−9	37 (Note: Hércules finished ahead of Cádiz on head-to-head points: Cádiz–Hércules 0–0, Hércules–Cádiz 2–0)	
12	Cádiz	38	11	15	12	32	40	−8	37	
13	Real Santander	38	15	6	17	48	50	−2	36	
14	Oviedo (O)	38	12	10	16	41	37	+4	34	Qualification for the relegation playoffs
15	Logroñés (O)	38	10	13	15	35	38	−3	33	Qualification for the relegation playoffs
16	Villarreal (O)	38	11	10	17	37	55	−18	32 (Note: Villarreal finished ahead of Langreo on head-to-head goal difference: Villarreal–Langreo 2–0, Langreo–Villarreal 2–1)	Qualification for the relegation playoffs
17	Langreo (O)	38	11	10	17	24	42	−18	32	Qualification for the relegation playoffs
18	Onteniente (R)	38	8	15	15	30	47	−17	31	Relegation to Tercera División
19	Calvo Sotelo (R)	38	11	7	20	38	48	−10	29	Relegation to Tercera División
20	Moscardó (R)	38	6	11	21	22	51	−29	23	Relegation to Tercera División

Source: BDFútbol
Rules for classification: 1) points; 2) head-to-head points; 3) head-to-head goal difference; 4) goal difference; 5) number of goals scored
(O) Play-off winners; (P) Promoted; (R) Relegated

=== Top goalscorers ===
Goalscorers	Goals	Team
(Spain) Santillana	16	Real Santander
(Spain) Manolín	15	Córdoba
(Spain) Marcos Orts	15	Hércules
(Spain) Enrique Galán	14	Oviedo
(Spain) Antonio Illán	13	Rayo Vallecano

=== Top goalkeepers ===
Goalkeeper	Goals	Matches	Average	Team
(Spain) Manuel Campos	24	32	0.75	Real Betis
(Spain) Alejandro Samper	28	37	0.76	Rayo Vallecano
(Spain) Victoriano Bilbao	29	38	0.76	Burgos
(Spain) Miguel Ángel Molina	28	36	0.78	Córdoba
(Spain) Andrés Mendieta	31	38	0.82	Castellón

== Results ==
Home \ Away	BET	BUR	CÁD	CAL	CAS	CÓR	DEP	FER	HÉR	LAN	LOG	MLL	MOS	ONT	OVI	PON	RAY	SAN	SAT	VIL
Betis	—	1–0	1–0	2–1	4–0	0–1	1–1	4–0	3–0	3–0	3–2	2–0	2–1	1–0	1–0	2–0	1–1	3–1	3–1	1–1
Burgos	1–0	—	5–0	3–0	1–0	1–0	3–1	2–1	1–0	2–0	0–0	1–1	1–0	4–0	1–1	2–0	2–0	3–1	3–1	2–1
Cádiz	1–1	3–1	—	3–0	0–0	1–1	3–1	0–0	0–0	0–0	1–1	1–0	1–0	0–0	0–1	0–0	0–0	2–0	3–0	1–2
Calvo Sotelo	3–1	0–1	1–2	—	2–2	1–1	0–1	3–0	1–1	1–0	1–1	3–1	2–0	2–2	1–0	1–0	0–1	3–0	3–2	4–0
Castellón	0–1	1–0	1–1	0–0	—	1–0	0–0	2–0	3–0	2–0	1–0	0–0	3–0	2–0	2–0	2–0	2–0	0–2	2–1	1–1
Córdoba	1–1	3–0	0–0	2–1	1–0	—	1–1	2–1	2–1	2–1	3–1	0–0	2–0	3–1	0–0	1–2	4–1	3–0	1–0	5–1
Deportivo	3–1	2–1	1–0	1–0	1–0	1–0	—	2–2	4–1	2–0	1–0	2–1	3–1	4–0	1–0	1–0	1–0	0–0	2–0	2–0
Ferrol	0–0	1–0	0–1	1–0	0–1	1–0	1–0	—	3–0	4–0	4–1	2–0	3–1	1–0	2–0	2–1	1–0	1–1	1–1	1–0
Hércules	0–0	1–0	2–0	2–0	1–1	2–2	0–0	2–0	—	1–0	0–0	3–1	2–1	1–1	1–1	3–1	1–0	1–0	4–1	2–1
Langreo	0–0	0–0	0–1	0–2	0–0	1–0	1–0	0–1	0–0	—	2–0	0–0	2–0	1–0	1–0	3–1	0–0	1–1	1–0	2–1
Logroñés	2–2	0–1	3–1	3–1	0–1	0–0	0–0	0–0	1–0	0–2	—	0–0	4–1	2–0	0–1	1–1	1–0	1–0	4–1	3–0
Mallorca	0–1	2–1	2–1	3–0	1–2	0–1	2–1	1–1	2–2	3–0	3–0	—	1–2	1–1	1–0	2–1	1–1	0–0	4–2	2–1
Moscardó	0–0	0–0	0–0	2–1	1–1	0–2	2–0	1–2	2–0	1–1	0–0	1–1	—	1–0	0–0	0–0	0–3	0–0	0–1	1–0
Onteniente	1–1	4–0	0–0	2–0	1–0	0–0	1–0	1–1	2–1	3–2	1–1	0–0	0–1	—	2–1	2–2	0–0	1–0	0–1	2–2
Oviedo	0–0	2–1	1–2	0–0	3–2	3–2	3–2	6–1	4–1	4–1	0–0	0–1	2–0	3–0	—	1–2	0–1	1–0	0–0	0–0
Pontevedra	5–2	0–0	2–2	2–0	1–1	2–0	1–0	2–0	2–0	2–0	2–1	0–0	1–0	2–0	0–0	—	2–1	0–2	1–0	3–0
Rayo Vallecano	0–1	1–2	6–0	2–0	3–0	2–1	1–1	2–0	1–0	2–0	1–0	0–0	2–1	0–0	1–0	4–2	—	3–0	2–0	3–0
San Andrés	0–0	1–0	1–0	1–0	3–1	2–1	2–0	2–0	2–0	1–1	1–0	1–1	0–0	2–1	2–0	1–1	0–2	—	2–1	1–1
Real Santander	0–1	1–0	5–1	2–0	2–1	0–0	2–0	1–0	4–1	0–1	0–2	1–1	1–0	3–0	3–2	2–0	3–3	2–0	—	2–0
Villarreal	1–3	0–0	1–0	1–0	0–2	0–2	1–1	3–0	1–2	2–0	2–0	1–0	3–2	1–1	2–1	2–0	2–1	1–1	1–1	—

Source: BDFútbol
Legend: Blue = home team win; Yellow = draw; Red = away team win.

== Relegation playoffs ==
=== First leg ===
13 June 1971	Gerona	1–2	Villarreal	Girona
	Martí 68'	Report	Esteve 33', 87'	Stadium: Montilivi; Referee: Peiró Apastegui

13 June 1971	Logroñés	3–0	Cartagena	Logroño
	Goicoechea 9', 23'; Berasategui 47'	Report		Stadium: Las Gaunas; Referee: Forés Bachero

13 June 1971	Oviedo	2–0	Palencia	Oviedo
	Galán 4'; Del Cueto 53'	Report		Stadium: Carlos Tartiere; Referee: Rodríguez Barroso

13 June 1971	Orense	1–1	Langreo	Ourense
	Seijas 35'	Report	Sánchez Iglesias 80'	Stadium: José Antonio; Referee: Sánchez Arminio

=== Second leg ===
20 June 1971	Villarreal	2–0 (4–1 agg.)	Gerona	Villarreal
	Burguete 8'; Casco 30'	Report		Stadium: El Madrigal; Referee: Pérez Quintas

20 June 1971	Cartagena	2–0 (2–3 agg.)	Logroñés	Cartagena
	Ginesín 9'; Añil 53'	Report		Stadium: El Almarjal; Referee: Molina Segovia

20 June 1971	Palencia	1–2 (1–4 agg.)	Oviedo	Palencia
	Tinin 82'	Report	Galán 3', 29'	Stadium: La Balastera; Referee: Orellana Álvarez

20 June 1971	Langreo	3–1 (4–2 agg.)	Orense	Langreo
	Secades 12'; Pucho 47'; Lozano 70' (o.g.)	Report	Gradin 22'	Stadium: Ganzábal; Referee: López Montenegro
