= Luis Manuel =

Luis Manuel may refer to:

- Luis Manuel (footballer, born 1967), Spanish football centre-back
- Luís Manuel (footballer, born 1981), Portuguese football midfielder
