= Rafael Ponzo =

Venezuelan footballer (born 1978)

Rafa Ponzo
Personal information
- Full name: Rafael Antonio Ponzo García
- Date of birth: 18 October 1978 (age 48)
- Place of birth: Caracas, Venezuela
- Height: 1.82 m (6 ft 0 in)
- Position: Goalkeeper

Youth career
- UCV Maracay
- Deportivo La Trinidad

Senior career*
Years	Team	Apps	(Gls)
1998–2001	Siero	26	(0)
1999–2000	→ Navarro (loan)	21	(0)
2001–2003	Tenerife B		
2003–2006	Real Oviedo	104	(0)
2006–2009	Girona	73	(0)
2009–2010	Ceuta	10	(0)
2010	Nea Salamis	10	(0)
2010	Ermis	2	(0)
2011	Mineros Guayana	14	(0)
2011–2015	Marino	135	(0)
2015–2016	Aragua	36	(0)
2017	UES	11	(0)
2017	Angostura		

International career
2004–2006	Venezuela	2	(0)
- * Club domestic league appearances and goals

Rafael 'Rafa' Antonio Ponzo García (born 18 October 1978) is a Venezuelan former professional footballer who played as a goalkeeper.

== Club career ==
Born in Caracas, Ponzo left his country at the age of 20 and moved to Spain, where he played for the vast majority of his career, albeit almost exclusively in the lower leagues. His first stop was at Club Siero in the fourth division, and he went on to represent, also in that tier, Tenerife's reserves and Real Oviedo, achieving promotion to the third level with the latter in 2005.

With his next team, Girona, Ponzo achieved two consecutive promotions, making his Segunda División debut on 30 August 2008 in a 1–0 away win against Celta de Vigo and appearing in 37 matches during the season to help the Catalans retain their league status after ranking 16th (44 goals conceded – three of those in a 3–0 loss at Hércules in the late stages in which he was held responsible for the outcome by his own manager Raül Agné). He started 2009–10 back in division three with Ceuta, but moved after a few months to Cyprus, where he played for two clubs in quick succession before returning to his homeland and join Mineros de Guayana.

On 7 July 2011, Ponzo signed with another side in the Spanish third division and Asturias, Marino de Luanco. After two years back in his country with Aragua FC, he moved to UES.

38-year-old Ponzo returned to Venezuela in the middle of 2017, signing with Segunda División's Angostura FC.

== International career ==
Ponzo made two appearances for the Venezuela national team.
