= Lalo (footballer) =

Spanish footballer and manager

Personal information
- Birth name: Eduardo Gómez García-Barbón
- Date of birth: 14 March 1936 (age 90)
- Place of birth: Oviedo, Asturias, Spain
- Height: 1.71 m (5 ft 7 in)
- Position: Forward

Senior career*
Years	Team	Apps	(Gls)
1952–1953	Real Oviedo Vetusta		
1953–1960	Real Oviedo		
1954–1955	→ Real Oviedo Vetusta (on loan)		
1955	→ Real Avilés (on loan)		
1960–1962	Granada		
1962–1968	Real Murcia		

International career
1960	Spain B	1	(0)

Managerial career
- 1968–1971: Real Murcia
- 1971–1973: Villarreal
- 1974–1975: Almería
- 1975–1977: Pontevedra
- 1977–1978: Calvo Sotelo
- 1978–1979: Real Oviedo
- 1979–1981: Linares
- 1981–1982: Granada
- 1982–1983: Real Jaén
- 1983–1985: Avilés Industrial
- 1988–1989: Granada
- 1990–1994: Polideportivo Ejido
- 2000–2001: Granada
- * Club domestic league appearances and goals

Eduardo Gómez García-Barbón, better known as Lalo (born 14 March 1936) was a Spanish footballer who played as a forward for Real Oviedo, Granada, and Real Murcia in the 1950s and 1960s. He later worked as a manager, coaching all of his former teams at some point.

== Club career ==
=== Real Oviedo ===
Born on 14 March 1936 in Oviedo, Lalo started his football career in Real Oviedo Vetusta in 1952, the second team of his hometown club Real Oviedo, with whom he signed a professional contract at just 17 years old, but only after having resolved legal issues arising from his minority, given the regulations of those times. On 11 April 1954, only one month after turning 18 years old, he made his official debut with the first team, a La Liga fixture against Real Sociedad at the Atotxa Stadium in San Sebastián, which ended in a 1–0 loss.

Lalo then spent the entire 1954–55 season at Vetusta, as well as three months of the 1955–56 season at Real Avilés, but then established himself as a starter in the 1955–56 season. On 23 February 1956, he scored a brace in the Asturian derby to help his side to a famous 6–0 victory over Sporting de Gijón at El Molinón. In total, he played in six Asturian derbies, losing one of them 1–4; bored by their fourth goal, he began following and nagging the referee, who responded by giving the first (and only) red card of Lalo's career. On 2 September 1956, he started in the final of the 1956 Trofeo Concepción Arenal, which ended in a 1–0 loss to Deportivo de La Coruña.

Two years later, Lalo was the architect behind the team's triumphant campaign in the 1957–58 Segunda División, as he scored an impressive 20 goals in 28 league matches, which earned him that season's golden boot. However, he did not play the last six matches of the season due to a serious injury that he sustained against Coruña at the Riazor. They initially tried to play him at all costs, as he was the team's top scorer, but his leg finally gave out during a friendly match. During that season, Real Madrid had shown interest in signing him, but they changed their mind following his injury, and two years later, in 1960, Real Oviedo sold Lalo for two pesetas to Granada, to whom they owed a million. In total, he scored 59 goals in 83 official matches for Oviedo.

=== Granada and Murcia ===
In 1960, Lalo joined Granada, where he stayed for two years, until 1962, when he went to Real Murcia, with whom he played for six years, until 1968, when he hung up his boots at the age of 32. He arrived at Murcia as part of a trio with defender Delfín Álvarez and midfielder Martínez, and in his first season there, he demonstrated his goalscoring instinct, elegant passing, and intelligence as he helped them win the 1962–63 Segunda División, thus achieving promotion to La Liga. As he got older, Lalo gradually dropped back, which diminished his goalscoring tallies. In his last season, he told the Murcia board that the coach had been playing poker with the players and sometimes owned them money, but nothing was done, and shortly after, he told the coach that he could not play due to strong pain in his groin, but he was forced to do so because of the uproar that his complaint had raised within the club; in the end, Lalo retired and the coach was sacked for ethical reasons.

== International career ==
Lalo earned his first (and only) international cap for Spain B in a friendly match in 1960.

== Managerial career ==
After his career as a player ended, Lalo remained linked to Real Murcia, now as the coach of its reserve team, Real Murcia Imperial, but six months later, he began playing again and Murcia wanted to re-sign him, so he instead went to Madrid to get his national coaching certificate. He then oversaw Real Murcia's first team for three years, from 1968 until 1971. Frustrated by the inertia of Murcia's management team, he spoke with the editors of the Murcia newspapers La Línea and La Verdad, which led to his dismal from the club. He then went to Seville, his wife's homeland, where he briefly worked at Hércules, but he was forced to leave because he was disliked by one of the club's directors, who was also a colonel, as Lalo had dropped his son from Murcia's first team.

After a brief stint at the helm of Villarreal (1971–73), he was called by Antonio Franco Navarro to replace Cayetano Ré as the new coach of Almería, and the first thing he did after arriving there in December 1974, was to attend a boxing match at the Municipal Sports Hall in Almería. He then miraculously saved from relegation to Regional Preferente, but he still left the club at the end of the season because Almería's financial offer was inferior to that of Pontevedra. After a brief stint at the helm of Calvo Sotelo (1977–78), Lalo became the coach of Oviedo for the 1978–79 season. During his time in Oviedo, he had a heated debate with President Yagüe over the usage of a certain striker, but the fans were behind him, and most members as well after a meeting with them at the Rey del Café Irlandés on Avenida de Galicia. At the time, Yagüe had a dealership with SEAT, so the journalists made headlines stating that "Renault was beating SEAT". Although he left before the end of the season, his assistant José María followed the same line and ended up leading Oviedo to a promotion to the Second Division.

In January 1980, Lalo was appointed as the new coach of Linares, but despite taking over the club midway through the season, he managed to gain momentum and surprisingly won the 1979–80 Segunda División B, thus achieving promotion. After two one-season stints at his former club Granada (1981–82) and Real Jaén (1982–83), Lalo took Real Avilés, which he led for two seasons between 1983 and 1985. In the early 1990s, he achieved significant feats as a coach in the province of Almería, such as leading Polideportivo Ejido into their best-ever season in 1991–92, in which they nearly achieved promotion to the Segunda División, and then serving as the right-hand man of Antonio Oviedo in the promotion of Mármol Macael to Segunda División B in 1993. After a five-year hiatus, he returned to the world of football for one last season as the coach of Granada in 2000–01, at the age of 65. He was noted for his ability to manage the locker room and the players' egos.

== Later life ==
A resident of Granada, surrounded by family, Lalo frequently visits Oviedo, and always spent the summers in Luanco.

== Legacy ==
In 2015, Lalo was awarded with the Gold Badge of the Association in 2015. During a Second Division match between Oviedo and Real Zaragoza in May 2017, Lalo was honored in the presidential box at the Carlos Tartiere stadium.

Six days ago, on 14 March 2025, Lalo received a visit from a Real Oviedo representative, who congratulated him on his 90th birthday, even though it was only his 89th, and then gave him a personalized jersey with the number 90.

== Honours ==
Real Oviedo

- Segunda División:
  - Champions (1): 1957–58

Real Murcia

- Segunda División:
  - Champions (1): 1962–63
