= Miguel Narváez =

Spanish footballer (born 2002)

Personal information
- Full name: Miguel de Jesús Narváez López
- Date of birth: 29 April 2002 (age 24)
- Place of birth: Badajoz, Spain
- Height: 1.88 m (6 ft 2 in)
- Position: Goalkeeper

Team information
- Current team: Oviedo
- Number: 1

Youth career
- 2012–2014: Badajoz
- 2014–2019: Don Bosco
- 2019–2021: Badajoz

Senior career*
Years	Team	Apps	(Gls)
2019–2022	Badajoz B	30	(0)
2022–2024	Badajoz	35	(0)
2024–2026	Oviedo B	59	(0)
2026–	Oviedo	1	(0)
- * Club domestic league appearances and goals as of 2 October 2026

Miguel de Jesús Narváez López (born 29 April 2002) is a Spanish professional footballer who plays as a goalkeeper for Real Oviedo.

== Career ==
Born in Badajoz, Extremadura, Narváez joined CD Badajoz's youth sides in 2012, and spent a period at CP Don Bosco before returning to the club in 2019. He then made his senior debut with the reserves in the regional leagues shortly after, and signed his first professional contract on 30 April 2021, agreeing to a deal until 2024.

After becoming a regular starter for the B's (now in Tercera División RFEF), Narváez was definitely promoted to the main squad in Primera Federación in July 2022. A backup to Kike Royo as the club suffered relegation, he further extended his link until 2025 on 17 July 2023, and became a first-choice afterwards.

On 1 July 2024, Narváez moved to Real Oviedo on a three-year contract, being initially assigned to the reserves in the fifth division. Ahead of the 2026–27 campaign, he was promoted to the first team in Segunda División, and made his professional debut on 2 October 2026, starting in a 4–1 away loss to CD Eldense.
