= CD Toledo =

Association football club in Spain

Toledo
- Full name: Club Deportivo Toledo, S.A.D.
- Nicknames: El Águila bicéfala (The Double-headed Eagle); Verdes (The Greens)
- Founded: 24 April 1928; 98 years ago (as Imperial C.N.S.)
- Stadium: Salto del Caballo
- Capacity: 5,500
- Owner: Grupo Ibérica
- President: Joaquín Sánchez Garrido
- Head coach: Borja Bardera
- League: Tercera Federación – Group 18
- 2025–26: Tercera Federación – Group 18, 3rd of 18
- Website: cdtoledo.es
Home colours	Away colours

Club Deportivo Toledo, S.A.D. is a Spanish football team based in Toledo, in the autonomous community of Castile-La Mancha. Founded in 1928 it plays in Tercera Federación – Group 18, holding home games at Estadio Salto del Caballo, with a seating capacity of 5,500 spectators.

Home kits consist of green shirts and white shorts.

== History ==
Since the early 20th century, the city of Toledo began hosting football matches, especially due to the sport’s growing popularity within the military. This was facilitated by the fact that Toledo was home to the Infantry Academy. As a result, several modest clubs soon emerged with the express intention of practicing a sport that had become all the rage in Spain. Among them were the Sociedad Gimnástica (formed by members of the Central School of Gymnastics), the Racing Club de Toledo, the club of the National Arms Factory based in the city, and military teams from the Infantry Academy and the Engineers Academy.

Over time, the need arose to create a single representative team that could unite the strengths of these clubs and combine quality and strength to compete against provincial and regional rivals. Thus, on April 24, 1928, the “Sociedad de Foot-ball Toledo” was born—a team founded at a time when football was still transitioning between amateurism and professionalism. It was at the Polígono field, donated by the School of Gymnastics, where the players began to write the first lines of a legend that still lives on today.

The enthusiasm generated by the Club quickly grew, and on May 30, 1931, it inaugurated its own stadium: Palomarejos. The first match played there was against Real Madrid.

On June 7, 1932, the club—which wore white shirts and shorts—officially joined the Central Federation and changed its name to “Toledo Foot-ball Club,” adopting a white shirt and black shorts until the outbreak of the Spanish Civil War in 1936. After the war, the team lost its field, and it was “Educación y Descanso de Toledo” that paid off the club’s debts. This entity was officially established on December 26, 1939, thereby picking up the torch of the original club and taking over ownership of the stadium, becoming its primary tenant.

=== Early years ===
Until then, the Toledo team didn’t have a defined colour for their kit. It was the club’s secretary, Juan Montero, who one day travelled to Madrid and, in early 1940, chose green shirts and white shorts at the store "La Flecha de Oro," located in Plaza de Cascorro. In 1941, the team won the Spring Cup, defeating Rayo Vallecano in the final.

On August 11, 1941, the Castilian Football Federation authorised the team to change its name to Club Deportivo Toledo. The club was registered in Group II of the First Regional Division of Castilla, debuting on September 21, 1941. Toledo finished fifth in the league, but once again shone in the Spring Cup, securing their second consecutive title against U.D. Girod. After a 4-4 draw, Alvareda scored a brilliant goal in the tiebreaker match to claim victory.

The 1942–43 season became one of the club’s best early years. Toledo won the double – the League and the Spring Cup – and was promoted to the national Third Division.

On September 26, 1943, CD Toledo made its Third Division debut against Deportivo Manchego at Palomarejos, winning 3-2. The team finished the season in 11th place, thus maintaining the category, something they would achieve for 18 consecutive seasons. That first year in the Third Division also marked the club’s fourth straight Castilla Cup title, beating Ferroviaria in the final.

The following season brought the first official match between CD Toledo and Talavera. It took place on November 12, 1944, in Talavera, and Toledo won 2-3 with goals from Fernández, Florencio, and Matamoros. On January 21, 1945, Talavera visited Toledo at Palomarejos, and the home team won again, 5-4.

The 1945–46 season was a brilliant one for CD Toledo. The green team finished third in the league and qualified for the promotion playoffs to the Second Division. Although they fell short of promotion, they dazzled once again in the Ramón Triana Cup, securing their first title in that competition. The final, played against Fuyma on July 7, 1946, marked another milestone, with Toledo winning decisively.

The 1946–47 season kicked off on September 8, 1946, with a trip to Cuenca, where Toledo secured a 2-4 victory. The season saw alternating results, and it all came down to the last matchday on January 5, 1947, with a visit to Alcázar de San Juan. During the game, Toledo’s goalkeeper Peteira was hit in the head with a brick thrown by a spectator, and the match was suspended at halftime. The federation awarded the win to Toledo, who finished third in the table, narrowly missing out on the promotion playoffs. On February 2, 1947, the Complementary Tournament began, and Toledo emerged as champions.

The 1947–48 season marked CD Toledo’s debut in the Copa del Generalísimo. In the league, they debuted on September 22, 1947, with a 2-2 draw against Plus Ultra in Madrid. Their first cup match took place on October 19, 1947, against Talavera, with a 3-1 win at Palomarejos and advancement to the next round.

In the second round of the Cup, CD Toledo defeated Chamberí 6-3, and in the next, they beat Ávila 4-2. The league season ended with Toledo in seventh place, and in the fourth round of the Cup, they faced Málaga at La Rosaleda. The 11-4 loss marked the end of their first cup campaign.

The following season began on September 5, 1948, with the first round of the Cup, where Toledo fell 5-2 to Talavera. On the 12th, the domestic competition started in Cáceres with a 4-3 loss. It was a solid season overall, with a crucial final match in Tomillos. A win would have secured promotion, but Toledo only managed a 1-1 draw after a controversial disallowed goal by Nuño. The draw handed promotion to Numancia de Soria, who were tied on points with Toledo but had a better goal average.

Founded in 1928, Toledo played in regional football and the lower reaches of the national game until earning back-to-back promotions to make the Segunda División for the first time in 1993, under manager Gonzalo Hurtado. The team won a playoff group ahead of Deportivo Alavés, Real Jaén and Sant Andreu, and then came fourth in the second tier in 1993–94.

In 1994–95, Toledo reached a best-ever last 16 of the Copa del Rey before losing 3–1 on aggregate to Mallorca. A seven-year spell in the second tier ended with finishing dead last in 1999–2000, but the team had a famous result on 13 December 2000 when they won 2–1 at home to Real Madrid in the last 64 of the cup, before losing by a single goal to visitors Rayo Vallecano in the next round.

Since their 2000 relegation, Toledo have spent over 20 years between the third and fourth tiers. In that time, the team have twice been eliminated from the last 32 of the cup by La Liga opponents: in 2001–02 (3–2 home extra-time loss to Athletic Bilbao) and 2016–17 (4–1 on aggregate to Villarreal).

== Season to season ==
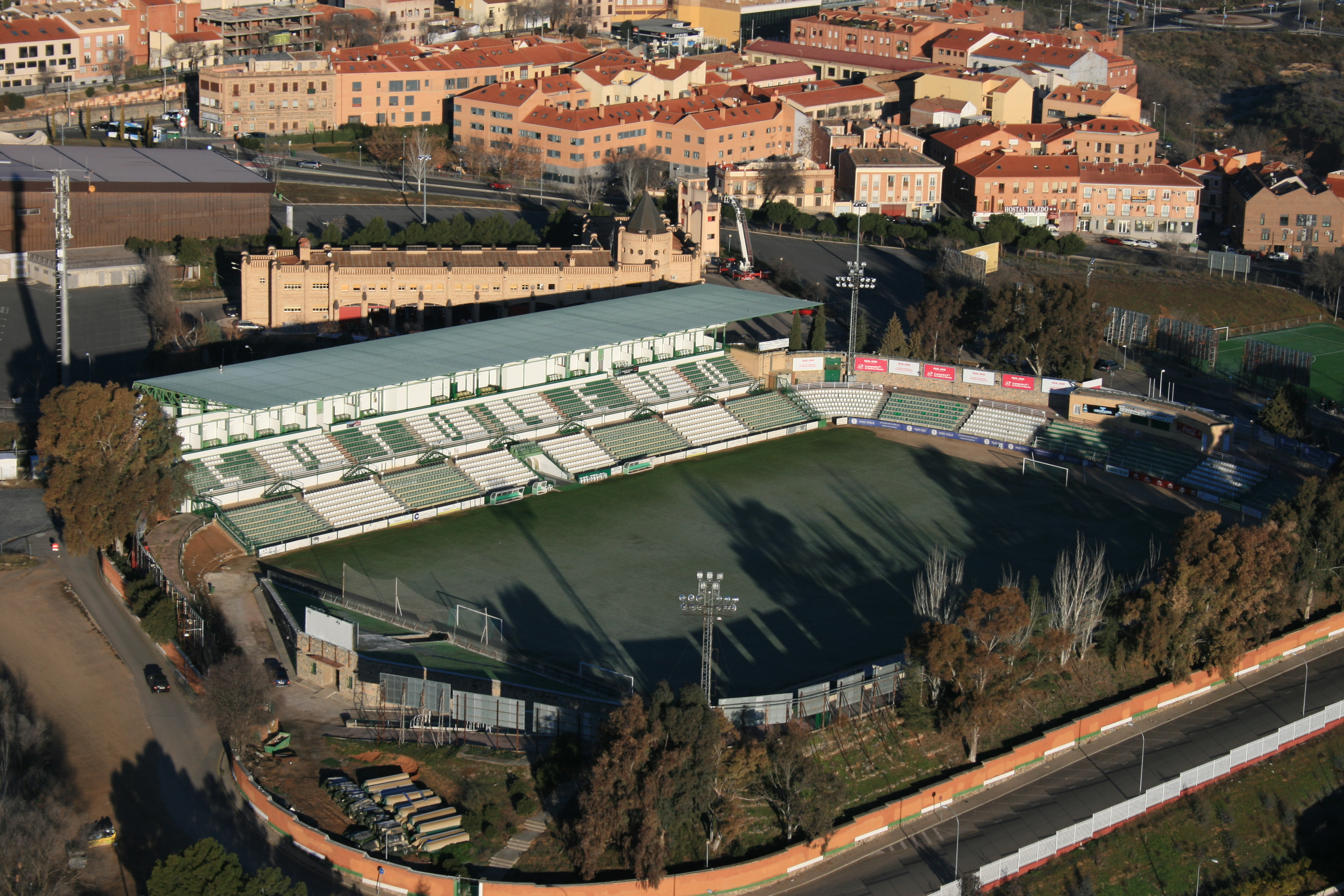
Salto del Caballo Stadium

Season	Tier	Division	Place	Copa del Rey
1941–42	3	1ª Reg.	5th	
1942–43	3	1ª Reg.	1st	
1943–44	3	3ª	7th	Second round
1944–45	3	3ª	5th	
1945–46	3	3ª	3rd	
1946–47	3	3ª	3rd	
1947–48	3	3ª	7th	Fifth round
1948–49	3	3ª	4th	First round
1949–50	3	3ª	1st	
1950–51	3	3ª	14th	
1951–52	3	3ª	10th	
1952–53	3	3ª	6th	
1953–54	3	3ª	11th	
1954–55	3	3ª	8th	
1955–56	3	3ª	3rd	
1956–57	3	3ª	9th	
1957–58	3	3ª	13th	
1958–59	3	3ª	8th	
1959–60	3	3ª	10th	
1960–61	3	3ª	5th	

Season	Tier	Division	Place	Copa del Rey
1961–62	3	3ª	15th	
1962–63	4	1ª Reg.	2nd	
1963–64	3	3ª	2nd	
1964–65	3	3ª	4th	
1965–66	3	3ª	10th	
1966–67	3	3ª	5th	
1967–68	3	3ª	16th	
1968–69	4	1ª Reg.	3rd	
1969–70	3	3ª	19th	
1970–71	4	1ª Reg.	14th	
1971–72	4	1ª Reg.	17th	
1972–73	5	2ª Reg.	2nd	
1973–74	5	1ª Reg.	1st	
1974–75	4	Reg. Pref.	3rd	
1975–76	4	Reg. Pref.	4th	
1976–77	4	Reg. Pref.	7th	
1977–78	4	3ª	13th	Third round
1978–79	4	3ª	4th	First round
1979–80	4	3ª	9th	Second round
1980–81	4	3ª	20th	First round

Season	Tier	Division	Place	Copa del Rey
1981–82	5	Reg. Pref.	13th	
1982–83	5	Reg. Pref.	6th	
1983–84	5	Reg. Pref.	4th	
1984–85	5	Reg. Pref.	9th	
1985–86	5	Reg. Pref.	8th	
1986–87	5	Reg. Pref.	7th	
1987–88	4	3ª	3rd	
1988–89	4	3ª	1st	
1989–90	3	2ª B	9th	
1990–91	3	2ª B	17th	First round
1991–92	4	3ª	1st	Second round
1992–93	3	2ª B	3rd	First round
1993–94	2	2ª	4th	Fifth round
1994–95	2	2ª	11th	Round of 16
1995–96	2	2ª	9th	First round
1996–97	2	2ª	14th	Second round
1997–98	2	2ª	12th	Second round
1998–99	2	2ª	7th	First round
1999–2000	2	2ª	22nd	First round
2000–01	3	2ª B	4th	Round of 32

Season	Tier	Division	Place	Copa del Rey
2001–02	3	2ª B	9th	Round of 32
2002–03	3	2ª B	12th	
2003–04	3	2ª B	18th	
2004–05	4	3ª	10th	
2005–06	4	3ª	3rd	
2006–07	4	3ª	3rd	
2007–08	4	3ª	1st	
2008–09	4	3ª	1st	Round of 64
2009–10	3	2ª B	16th	First round
2010–11	4	3ª	1st	
2011–12	3	2ª B	17th	
2012–13	4	3ª	1st	
2013–14	3	2ª B	3rd	First round
2014–15	3	2ª B	9th	First round
2015–16	3	2ª B	4th	
2016–17	3	2ª B	2nd	Round of 32
2017–18	3	2ª B	17th	First round
2018–19	4	3ª	4th	
2019–20	4	3ª	4th	
2020–21	4	3ª	2nd / 3rd	

Season	Tier	Division	Place	Copa del Rey
2021–22	4	2ª RFEF	18th	
2022–23	5	3ª Fed.	8th	
2023–24	5	3ª Fed.	3rd	
2024–25	5	3ª Fed.	3rd	
2025–26	5	3ª Fed.	3rd	First round
2026–27	5	3ª Fed.		

- 7 seasons in Segunda División
- 14 seasons in Segunda División B
- 1 season in Segunda División RFEF
- 42 seasons in Tercera División
- 5 seasons in Tercera Federación

== Honours ==
- Copa Federación Centro
  - Winners (4): 1939–40, 1941–42, 1942–43, 1943–44

== Current squad ==
As of 1 September 2018

Note: Flags indicate national team as defined under FIFA eligibility rules; some limited exceptions apply. Players may hold more than one non-FIFA nationality.

No.	Pos.	Nation	Player
—	GK	ESP	Ernesto Machuca
—	GK	ESP	Rafa Hidalgo
—	DF	ESP	Chato
—	DF	ESP	Pascu
—	MF	ESP	Dani Santigosa
—	MF	GHA	Mohammed Amando
—	MF	ESP	Álvaro Antón
—	MF	ESP	Ángel Crespo
—	FW	ESP	Jokin Esparza
—	FW	ESP	Juan Cifuentes
—	FW	ESP	Jorge Ortí
—	FW	ESP	Rubén Moreno

== Notable former players ==
Note: this list includes players that have played at least 100 league games and/or have reached international status.

- (Andorra) Marc Bernaus
- (Colombia) Léider Preciado
- (Hungary) Gábor Korolovszky
- (Mexico) Carlos Alberto Rodríguez
- (Poland) Jerzy Podbrożny
- (Poland) Jan Urban
- (Russia) Andrey Mokh
- (Russia) Dmitri Popov
- (Spain) Diego Aguirre
- (Spain) Unai Emery
- (Spain) Luis García
- (Spain) Luis Manuel
- (Spain) Roberto Marina
- (Cameroon) Toledanito
- (Spain) Pedro Alberto

== Reserve team ==
Club Deportivo Toledo B is the reserve team of C.D. Toledo, it currently plays in Categorías Regionales.
