= José Sánchez Lage =

Argentine footballer

Personal information
- Full name: José María Sánchez Lage
- Date of birth: 11 May 1931
- Place of birth: Buenos Aires, Argentina
- Date of death: 31 December 2004 (aged 73)
- Place of death: Buenos Aires, Argentina
- Position: Winger

Senior career*
Years	Team	Apps	(Gls)
1950–1951	River Plate		
1951–1953	→ Club Atlético Banfield (loan)	85	(24)
1954–1955	Huracán	22	(4)
1955–1957	River Plate		
1958	Atlanta		
1958–1963	Real Oviedo	119	(37)
1963–1966	Valencia C.F.	74	(17)
1966–1967	Deportivo La Coruña	24	(4)
1967–1968	Levante		
1968–1970	River Plate		

Managerial career
- 1970–1976: Valencia C.F. (assistant)
- 1981: River Plate (assistant)
- * Club domestic league appearances and goals

José María Sánchez Lage was an Argentine professional footballer who played as a winger for several clubs, including River Plate and Club Atlético Banfield in Argentina and Real Oviedo and Valencia C.F. in Spain . His former teammate and friend Paquito said: "He was the second Di Stéfano in Spain."

The 1957–58 season had seen Real Oviedo promoted to La Liga. The club high point was a best-ever third position in 1962–63 (ranking joint-first with Real Madrid after the first 15 rounds). However, the club had been experiencing financial difficulties and, under Enrique Orizaola, had to sell Sánchez Lage and other key players, Paquito García and José María.
