= Paquito García =

Spanish footballer and manager (1938–2024)

Paquito
Personal information
- Full name: Francisco García Gómez
- Date of birth: 14 February 1938
- Place of birth: Oviedo, Spain
- Date of death: 21 August 2024 (aged 86)
- Place of death: Valencia, Spain
- Height: 1.81 m (5 ft 11 in)
- Position: Midfielder

Youth career
- Ovetense
- Cibeles
- Oviedo

Senior career*
Years	Team	Apps	(Gls)
1957–1963	Oviedo	115	(5)
1957–1958	→ Juvencia (loan)		
1958–1959	→ La Felguera (loan)		
1963–1972	Valencia	212	(26)
1972–1973	Mestalla	31	(1)

International career
1961	Spain B	1	(0)
1962–1967	Spain	9	(0)

Managerial career
- Benimar
- 1973–1974: Gandía
- 1974–1975: Alzira
- 1975–1976: Atlético Madrileño
- 1977–1978: Valladolid
- 1978–1980: Castellón
- 1980–1982: Valladolid
- 1982: Hércules
- 1983–1984: Valencia
- 1985–1986: Cádiz
- 1987–1988: Figueres
- 1989–1990: Las Palmas
- 1992–1993: Racing Santander
- 1994–1995: Rayo Vallecano
- 1995–1996: Osasuna
- 1996–1997: Rayo Vallecano
- 1999: Villarreal
- 1999–2000: Villarreal
- 2001–2002: Onda
- 2002: Villarreal
- 2004: Villarreal
Medal record
Representing Spain
UEFA European Championship
Winner	1964 Spain
- * Club domestic league appearances and goals

Francisco García Gómez (14 February 1938 – 21 August 2024), commonly known as Paquito, was a Spanish football midfielder and manager.

Over the course of 14 seasons, he played 327 La Liga games as a midfielder in representation of Real Oviedo and Valencia CF, scoring 31 goals. In the 1970–71 campaign, he appeared in 27 matches (all starts) and netted three times as the latter team won their fourth national championship, the first in 24 years.

== Playing career ==
Paquito was born in Oviedo, Asturias. Over the course of 6 seasons for Real Oviedo, he played 115 La Liga games as a midfielder, scoring 5 goals. The 1957–58 Segunda División campaign saw Real Oviedo promoted to La Liga. The club high point was a best-ever third position in 1962–63 (ranking joint-first with Real Madrid after the first 15 rounds). However, the club had been experiencing financial difficulties and, under Enrique Orizaola, had to sell Paquito and other key players Sánchez Lage and José María.

In the 1970–71 campaign, he appeared in 27 matches (all starts) and netted three times as the latter team won their fourth national championship, the first in 24 years.

Paquito earned nine caps for Spain during nearly five years, his debut coming on 1 November 1962 in a 6–0 home win against Romania for the 1964 European Nations' Cup qualifiers. He was part of Spain's squad that won the 1964 European Nations' Cup.

== Coaching career ==
Paquito coached for more than 30 years, his first job with the professionals being in the 1977–78 season with Real Valladolid (Segunda División, seventh position). He achieved three promotions to the top flight, with Racing de Santander (1993), Rayo Vallecano (1995) and Villarreal CF (2000).

With the latter club, Paquito also worked in directorial capacities, as an assistant manager, youth academy director and head coach of farm team CD Onda.

== Death ==
García died in Valencia on 21 August 2024, at the age of 86.

== Honours ==
Valencia

- La Liga: 1970–71
- Copa del Generalísimo: 1966–67
- Inter-Cities Fairs Cup: 1962–63

Spain

- UEFA European Championship: 1964
