= Argila (footballer) =

Spanish footballer

Personal information
- Full name: Fernando de Argila Pazzaglia
- Date of birth: 26 December 1920
- Place of birth: Barcelona, Spain
- Date of death: 8 January 2015 (aged 94)
- Height: 1.80 m (5 ft 11 in)
- Position: Goalkeeper

Senior career*
Years	Team	Apps	(Gls)
1940–1944	Barcelona	10	(0)
1944–1957	Oviedo	247	(0)
1951–1952	→ Atlético Madrid (loan)	20	(0)
Total		277	(0)

International career
1954	Spain	1	(0)
- * Club domestic league appearances and goals

Fernando de Argila Pazzaglia (26 December 1920 – 8 January 2015), known as Argila, was a Spanish footballer who played as a goalkeeper. Having begun his career with Barcelona in 1940, he moved to Oviedo in 1944 where he made 247 league appearances until 1957. He spent part of the 1951–52 season on loan at Atlético Madrid. He played in one match for the Spain national team in 1954. He was also named in Spain's squad for the Group 6 qualification tournament for the 1954 FIFA World Cup.
