= Enrique Orizaola =

Spanish football player and coach (1922–2013)

Personal information
- Full name: Enrique Orizaola Velázquez
- Date of birth: 26 March 1922
- Place of birth: Santander, Cantabria, Spain
- Date of death: 10 June 2013 (aged 91)
- Position: Midfielder

Senior career*
Years	Team	Apps	(Gls)
1941–1949	Racing Santander		
1949–1951	Gimnástica Torrelavega	50	(2)

Managerial career
- Gimnástica Torrelavega
- 1956–1958: Racing de Santander
- 1958–1959: Jaén
- 1959–1960: Murcia
- 1961: Barcelona
- 1962–1963: Osasuna
- 1963–1964: Oviedo
- 1964–1965: Levante
- 1966–1967: Deportivo La Coruña
- 1967–1968: Valladolid
- 1968–1969: Valladolid
- 1970–1971: Salamanca
- 1971–1972: Rayo Vallecano
- 1972: Sabadell
- 1973–1974: Deportivo La Coruña
- 1974–1975: Xerez
- 1975–1976: Marbella
- 1976–1978: Albacete
- 1978–1981: Calvo Sotelo
- 1981–1982: Badajoz
- * Club domestic league appearances and goals

Enrique Orizaola Velázquez (26 March 1922 – 10 June 2013) was a Spanish football player and coach.

== Playing career ==
Born in Santander, Orizaola played for Racing de Santander.

== Coaching career ==
Orizaola coached Gimnástica Torrelavega, Racing de Santander, Real Jaén, Real Murcia, Barcelona, and Osasuna.

While at Real Oviedo, the club experienced financial difficulties and lost key players Sánchez Lage, Paquito García and José María.

He went on to manage Levante, Deportivo, Real Valladolid, Rayo Vallecano, Sabadell, Albacete Balompié, Salamanca, CD Badajoz, Calvo Sotelo and Xerez CD.

At the start of 1961, he took on charge as manager of FC Barcelona after Ljubiša Broćić's sacking and achieved the greatest result of his career: he reached the first European Cup final of the club's history, eventually losing to SL Benfica 3-2.

His son, Enrique Orizaola Paz, was the chairman of Córdoba CF.
