= Real Oviedo =

Association football club in Spain

- Full name: Real Oviedo, S.A.D.
- Nicknames: Oviedistas; Carbayones; Los Azules (The Blues); Los Godos (The Goths)
- Founded: 26 March 1926; 100 years ago
- Stadium: Estadio Carlos Tartiere
- Capacity: 30,500
- Owner(s): Grupo Pachuca (51%); Grupo Carso (20%); Others (29%)
- President: Martín Peláez
- Head coach: Raúl González
- League: Segunda División
- 2025–26: La Liga, 20th of 20 (relegated)
- Website: realoviedo.es
Home colours	Away colours	Third colours

Real Oviedo, S.A.D. (Spanish: [reˈal oˈβjeðo]; Asturian: Real Uviéu [reˈal uˈβjew]) is a Spanish professional football club based in Oviedo, Asturias. Founded on 26 March 1926, the club plays in the Segunda División, the second level of the Spanish football league system. The club plays at the Estadio Carlos Tartiere, opened on 30 September 2000, and is the largest sports stadium in Asturias. In the La Liga all-time league table, Real Oviedo ranks 19th, having played 39 seasons in the top flight.

The club's local rivals are Sporting de Gijón on the sea coast to its north, with whom the club contests the Asturian derby.

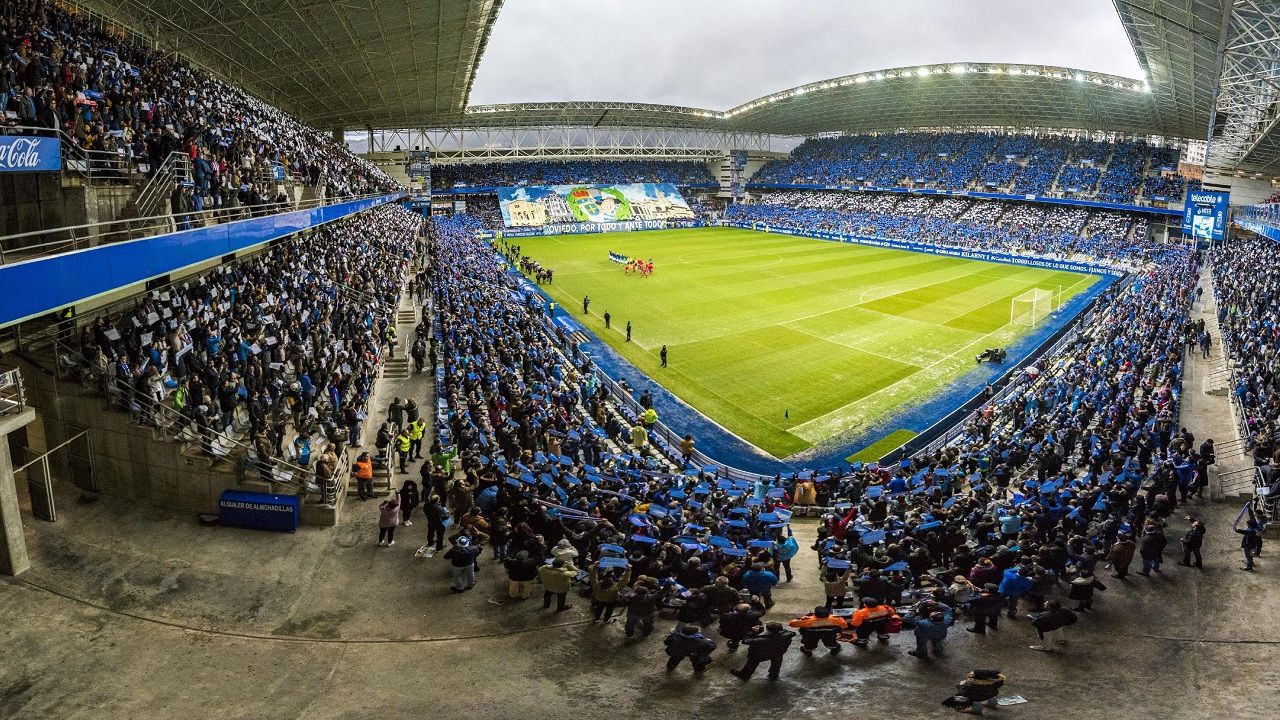
Real Oviedo home Stadium Estadio Carlos Tartiere.

== History ==
Founded in 1926 after a merger of Stadium Ovetense and Real Club Deportivo Oviedo. The first one was founded by young people who had studied in England, where the "foot-ball" was already popular. And the second club was founded a few years later by a split in the first. Carlos Tartiere served as the inaugural president when the club was established. Oviedo first reached La Liga seven years later.

Their attacking quartet of Emilín, Galé, Herrerita and Isidro Lángara (all represented Spain in this period), as well as Casuco and Ricardo Gallart modernised the game with their pace and running off the ball tied with sharp passing and one-touch football, played in a style 30/40 years before its time, being dubbed Delanteras Eléctricas ("The electric forwards"); all this was connected with a rigid training and fitness regime started by a former manager of the club, Englishman Fred Pentland.

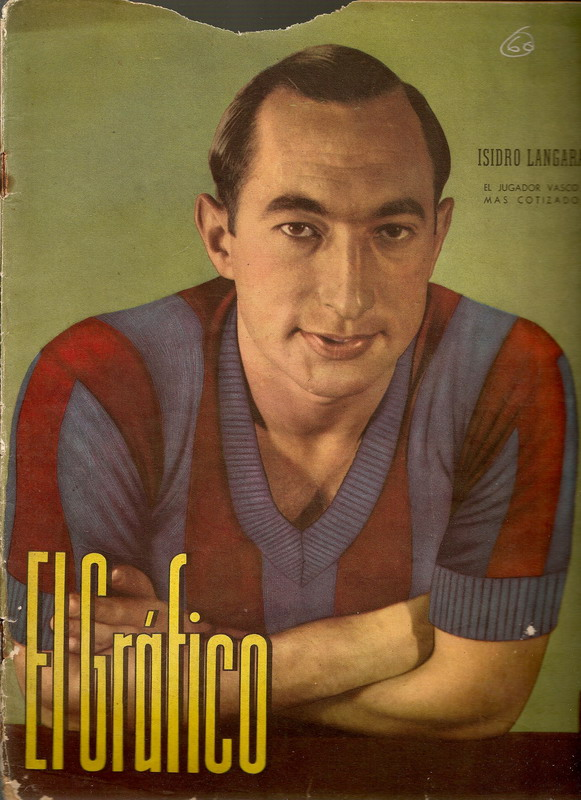
Isidro Lángara won three consecutive Pichichi trophies from 1933–34 to 1935–36.

Lángara won the Pichichi Trophy three years in a row prior to the Spanish Civil War, as Oviedo broke all scoring records (174 goals in 62 league games). With the outbreak of the conflict, however, the team broke up: Lángara emigrated to South America, Herrerita and Emilín signed with FC Barcelona, Galé with Racing de Santander and Gallart with Racing de Ferrol.

When football in the country resumed in 1939, Oviedo could not play 1939–40 season, as their pitch was deemed unplayable – Francisco Franco's troops had used the stadium as an ammunition dump. During the following decades, the club bounced back between the first and second levels. The 1957–58 Segunda División campaign saw them promoted to La Liga. The club high point was a best-ever third position in 1962–63 (ranking joint-first with Real Madrid after the first 15 rounds). However, the club had been experiencing financial difficulties and, under Enrique Orizaola, had to sell key players Sánchez Lage, Paquito García and José María. It finished the next season facing Relegation play-offs. Real Oviedo were Play-off winners but were subsequently relegated in 1964–65.

The first phase of El Requexón training centre was opened in 1969 by the efforts of then-club president Enrique Rubio Sanudo. Later in the 1980s, the second phase of the construction was completed by the efforts of then-president José Manuel Bango.

The lowest point was the side's first relegation to Segunda División B, in 1978 (for a single season).

With the FIFA World Cup to be held in Spain in 1982, the Carlos Tartiere Stadium was completely renewed, the first match being held with the Chile national team, 0–0. In 1984–85 Oviedo won the soon-to-be-defunct Spanish League Cup (second division), after successively defeating UD Salamanca, Bilbao Athletic, CF Lorca Deportiva, CE Sabadell FC and Atlético Madrileño (the latter with a 2–1 aggregate in the final).

In 1988 Oviedo returned to the top division, after ousting RCD Mallorca in the promotion playoffs (2–1 on aggregate, with striker Carlos, who would feature prominently for the club in the following years, scoring one of the goals), and remained in that level for 13 consecutive seasons – in 1990–91 it finished sixth, qualifying for the first time for Europe, and being knocked out in the first round by Genoa C.F.C. of Italy (2–3). Oviedo bounced back from that defeat immediately, with a 2–1 win at the Camp Nou over Barcelona.

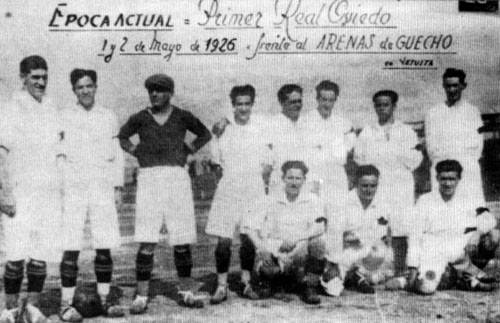
Real Oviedo first squad in 1926.

After that successful year, there were more brilliant seasons and others where relegation was narrowly dodged (in 1998 Real Oviedo succeeded in a relegation playoff to stay up after beating UD Las Palmas). In a nutshell, the Carbayones had an outstanding run in La Liga during the 1990s with a team which lined up top international players. In 1992 Real Oviedo as well as most Spanish football clubs was forced to become public limited sports company. The initial capital stock for Real Oviedo amounted to €3.6 million.

On 4 October 1995, Real Oviedo played its 1,000th game in La Liga.

In 2000, the new Carlos Tartiere Stadium with 30,500 seats became Real Oviedo's new ground. It was officially opened on 20 September 2000 with a match between Real Oviedo and Partizan Belgrade, where Real Oviedo lost 0–2 to the Serbian side. Three days before, Real Oviedo and UD Las Palmas had got a 2–2 draw on the first fixture in the 2000–01 season.

After being relegated two consecutive times, Real Oviedo suffered severe economic troubles, which, when coupled with a profound lack of institutional support from the city's government, resulted in the team's inability to pay its players. The club was then forced to drop all the way to the fourth division of Spanish football, for the 2003–04 season; at this point the team nearly folded but eventually recovered and regrouped, returning to level three in the following campaign.

Chart of Real Oviedo league performance 1929-present

Oviedo lasted two further campaigns before dropping down a level again. In another playoff against a Mallorca team – this time the reserves, the club returned again to the third division, after a penalty shootout; however, its survival remained at risk in the following years, due to continuing financial difficulties.

The financial dire straits continued into the 2012–13 season, when Oviedo called on supporters to buy shares in the club. A few footballers, notably Santi Cazorla, Juan Mata, Michu and Adrián who all started their careers there, offered their financial support in an attempt to save the club from bankruptcy – the club had until 17 November to raise €2 million in order to prevent closure. Zohran Mamdani, who would later be elected mayor of New York City in 2025, also bought a share.

On 17 November 2012, Carlos Slim, at the time the richest person in the world, invested $2.5 million in the club, therefore gaining a controlling stake.

On 31 May 2015, Oviedo confirmed their return to the Spanish Segunda División after a thirteen-year absence with a 2–1 aggregate victory over Cádiz in the 2015 Segunda División B play-offs. In the 2023–24 Segunda División, Oviedo finished sixth, earning a spot in the promotion play-offs, where they reached the final, winning the first leg 1–0, but lost 2–1 on aggregate to Espanyol.

On 21 June 2025, Oviedo secured promotion to La Liga for the first time in 24 years after defeating Mirandés 3–1 in the promotion play-off final. However, the club was relegated at the end of the 2025–26 season.

== Season to season ==
Season	Tier	Division	Place	Copa del Rey
1929	2	2ª	7th	Round of 16
1929–30	2	2ª	5th	Quarter-finals
1930–31	2	2ª	8th	Round of 16
1931–32	2	2ª	2nd	Round of 16
1932–33	2	2ª	1st	Round of 16
1933–34	1	1ª	6th	Semi-finals
1934–35	1	1ª	3rd	Round of 16
1935–36	1	1ª	3rd	Round of 16
1940–41	1	1ª	8th	Quarter-finals
1941–42	1	1ª	11th	Round of 16
1942–43	1	1ª	6th	Round of 16
1943–44	1	1ª	4th	Round of 16
1944–45	1	1ª	4th	Quarter-finals
1945–46	1	1ª	5th	Semi-finals
1946–47	1	1ª	8th	Round of 16
1947–48	1	1ª	9th	Round of 16
1948–49	1	1ª	5th	Round of 16
1949–50	1	1ª	14th	Quarter-finals
1950–51	2	2ª	6th	DNP
1951–52	2	2ª	1st	Quarter-finals

Season	Tier	Division	Place	Copa del Rey
1952–53	1	1ª	9th	Round of 16
1953–54	1	1ª	15th	DNP
1954–55	2	2ª	2nd	DNP
1955–56	2	2ª	2nd	DNP
1956–57	2	2ª	4th	DNP
1957–58	2	2ª	1st	DNP
1958–59	1	1ª	11th	Round of 16
1959–60	1	1ª	6th	Round of 16
1960–61	1	1ª	13th	Round of 16
1961–62	1	1ª	10th	Round of 16
1962–63	1	1ª	3rd	Round of 16
1963–64	1	1ª	14th	Round of 16
1964–65	1	1ª	15th	Round of 16
1965–66	2	2ª	4th	Round of 16
1966–67	2	2ª	5th	Round of 32
1967–68	2	2ª	6th	Round of 32
1968–69	2	2ª	11th	DNP
1969–70	2	2ª	7th	Round of 16
1970–71	2	2ª	14th	Round of 16
1971–72	2	2ª	1st	Round of 32

Season	Tier	Division	Place	Copa del Rey
1972–73	1	1ª	12th	Round of 16
1973–74	1	1ª	18th	Round of 16
1974–75	2	2ª	1st	Round of 16
1975–76	1	1ª	16th	Round of 16
1976–77	2	2ª	5th	Round of 32
1977–78	2	2ª	17th	Round of 16
1978–79	3	2ª B	2nd	Round of 32
1979–80	2	2ª	11th	Round of 16
1980–81	2	2ª	10th	Round of 32
1981–82	2	2ª	16th	Round of 32
1982–83	2	2ª	12th	Round of 32
1983–84	2	2ª	13th	Round of 32
1984–85	2	2ª	16th	Round of 16
1985–86	2	2ª	8th	Round of 16
1986–87	2	2ª	16th	Round of 32
1987–88	2	2ª	4th	Round of 32
1988–89	1	1ª	12th	Round of 32
1989–90	1	1ª	11th	Round of 16
1990–91	1	1ª	6th	Round of 16
1991–92	1	1ª	11th	Round of 16

Season	Tier	Division	Place	Copa del Rey
1992–93	1	1ª	16th	Quarter-finals
1993–94	1	1ª	9th	Quarter-finals
1994–95	1	1ª	9th	Round of 32
1995–96	1	1ª	14th	Round of 16
1996–97	1	1ª	17th	Round of 16
1997–98	1	1ª	18th	Round of 32
1998–99	1	1ª	14th	Round of 32
1999–2000	1	1ª	16th	Round of 16
2000–01	1	1ª	18th	Round of 32
2001–02	2	2ª	7th	Round of 32
2002–03	2	2ª	21st	Round of 16
2003–04	4	3ª	1st	Round of 32
2004–05	4	3ª	1st	Second round
2005–06	3	2ª B	7th	Second round
2006–07	3	2ª B	19th	First round
2007–08	4	3ª	1st	DNP
2008–09	4	3ª	1st	Second round
2009–10	3	2ª B	2nd	Second round
2010–11	3	2ª B	8th	Second round
2011–12	3	2ª B	6th	Round of 32

Season	Tier	Division	Place	Copa del Rey
2012–13	3	2ª B	3rd	Second round
2013–14	3	2ª B	5th	First round
2014–15	3	2ª B	1st	Round of 32
2015–16	2	2ª	9th	Third round
2016–17	2	2ª	8th	Second round
2017–18	2	2ª	7th	Second round
2018–19	2	2ª	8th	Second round
2019–20	2	2ª	15th	First round
2020–21	2	2ª	13th	Second round
2021–22	2	2ª	7th	First round
2022–23	2	2ª	8th	Round of 32
2023–24	2	2ª	6th	Second round
2024–25	2	2ª	3rd	First round
2025–26	1	1ª	20th	First round
2026–27	2	2ª		TBD

- 39 seasons in La Liga
- 43 seasons in Segunda División
- 9 seasons in Segunda División B
- 4 seasons in Tercera División

== European history ==
Season	Competition	Round	Opponent	Home	Away	Agg.
1991–92	UEFA Cup	R64	(Italy) Genoa	1–0	1–3	2–3

== Current squad ==
As of 4 October 2026

Note: Flags indicate national team as defined under FIFA eligibility rules; some limited exceptions apply. Players may hold more than one non-FIFA nationality.

No.	Pos.	Nation	Player
1	GK	ESP	Miguel Narváez
2	DF	ESP	Aisar Ahmed
3	DF	ESP	Juan Cruz
4	DF	ESP	David Costas (vice-captain)
5	MF	MAR	Youness Lachhab
6	MF	ESP	Dani Villahermosa
7	MF	MAR	Ilyas Chaira
8	MF	ESP	Mikel Goti (on loan from Real Sociedad)
9	FW	ESP	Chris Ramos (on loan from Botafogo)
10	MF	ESP	Alberto Reina
11	MF	ESP	Jacobo González
12	DF	ESP	Dani Calvo (captain)
13	GK	ESP	Aarón Escandell (3rd captain)
14	FW	ESP	Carlos Fernández

No.	Pos.	Nation	Player
15	DF	ESP	Samu Rodríguez
16	MF	ESP	Aritz Aldasoro (on loan from Racing Santander)
17	FW	ESP	Estanis Pedrola
18	FW	ESP	Víctor Mingo
19	MF	FRA	Brandon Domingues
20	MF	ESP	Pablo Sáenz
21	DF	ESP	David Jiménez
22	DF	ESP	Nacho Vidal (4th captain)
23	DF	ESP	Carlos Domínguez (on loan from Celta)
24	FW	ROU	Alexandru Ișfan
25	FW	ESP	José Luis Morales
28	MF	ESP	Dieguito
30	DF	ESP	Marco Esteban

=== Reserve team ===
Note: Flags indicate national team as defined under FIFA eligibility rules; some limited exceptions apply. Players may hold more than one non-FIFA nationality.

No.	Pos.	Nation	Player
27	GK	ESP	Samu Franganillo
32	MF	ESP	Enzo Pérez
33	FW	ESP	Óscar de la Hera

No.	Pos.	Nation	Player
34	MF	ESP	Enzo Cazorla
35	DF	ESP	Xavi Vicente

=== Out on loan ===
Note: Flags indicate national team as defined under FIFA eligibility rules; some limited exceptions apply. Players may hold more than one non-FIFA nationality.

No.	Pos.	Nation	Player
—	DF	NGR	Chukwuma Eze (at Villarreal B until 30 June 2027)
—	MF	ESP	Álex Cardero (at Cultural Leonesa until 30 June 2027)

No.	Pos.	Nation	Player
—	MF	ESP	Pablo Agudín (at Sant Andreu until 30 June 2027)

=== Current technical staff ===
Position	Staff
Head coach	(Spain) Raúl González
Assistant coach	(Spain) Pedro Díaz
Fitness coach	(Spain) Roberto Ovejero
Delegate	(Spain) Gabriel Piquero
Goalkeeping coach	(Spain) Jesús Unanua
Field delegate	(Spain) Andrés Torre
Analyst	(Spain) Alfredo Estebánez (Spain) Javier Benavides
Equipment manager	(Spain) Rodri Bacci Anselmi (Spain) Manuel Antonio Campa "Lito" (Spain) Silvino Aparicio
Readaptator	(Spain) Braulio Alcántara (Spain) Pablo González
Doctor	(Spain) Diego Cervero (Spain) David Bonilla
Head of the physiotherapy and rehabilitation department	(Spain) Gabriel Díaz Peláez
Physiotherapist	(Spain) Manuel García (Spain) Gonzalo Castaño
Nutritionist	(Spain) Luis Frechoso

Last updated: 10 November 2026
Source: Real Oviedo (in Spanish)

== Honours ==
- Segunda División

Winners (5): 1932–33, 1951–52, 1957–58, 1971–72, 1974–75

- Copa de la Liga Segunda División

Winners (1): 1984–85

- Segunda División B

Winners (1): 2014–15

- Tercera División

Winners (4): 2003–04, 2004–05, 2007–08, 2008–09

- Galician Championship (Campeonato Regional Mancomunado Galáico-Astur)

Winners (2): 1934–35, 1935–36

=== Individual ===
==== Pichichi Trophy ====
- La Liga: Isidro Lángara (3) (1933–34, 1934–35, 1935–36), Marianín (1972–73)
- Segunda División: Isidro Lángara (1932–33), Lalo (1957–58), Galán (1971–72), Carlos (1987–88), Borja Bastón (2021–22)
- Segunda División B: Miguel Linares (2014–15)
- Tercera División: Diego Cervero (3) (2004–05, 2007–08, 2008–09)

==== Zamora Trophy ====
- Segunda División: Óscar Álvarez (2) (1931–32, 1932–33), Lombardía (1971–72)
- Tercera División: Rafael Ponzo (2003–04), Oinatz Aulestia (2008–09)

== Notable former players ==
Note: this list includes players that have appeared in at least 100 league games and/or have reached international status.

- (Angola) David Carmo
- (Argentina) Juan José Borrelli
- (Argentina) Fernando Gamboa
- (Argentina) Roberto Pompei
- (Argentina) José Sánchez Lage
- (Belgium) Gert Claessens
- (Belgium) Leander Dendoncker
- (Canada) Marcelo Flores
- (Croatia) Josip Brekalo
- (Croatia) Nenad Gračan
- (Croatia) Janko Janković
- (Croatia) Nikola Jerkan
- (Croatia) Robert Prosinečki
- (Denmark) Peter Møller
- (Egypt) Haissem Hassan
- (England) Stan Collymore
- (Equatorial Guinea) Kily Álvarez
- (Equatorial Guinea) Yago Yao
- (Ghana) Kwasi Sibo
- (Ghana) Owusu Kwabena
- (Ghana) Yaw Yeboah
- (Iceland) Diego Johannesson
- (Italy) Diego Fabbrini
- (Ivory Coast) Eric Bailly
- (Ivory Coast) Idrissa Keita
- (Kenya) McDonald Mariga
- (Madagascar) Franck Rabarivony
- (Mexico) Oswaldo Alanís
- (Mexico) José Manuel de la Torre
- (Niger) Rahim Alhassane
- (North Macedonia) Mitko Stojkovski
- (Panama) Édgar Bárcenas
- (Panama) Dely Valdés
- (Paraguay) Florencio Amarilla
- (Paraguay) Ramón Hicks
- (Portugal) Abel Xavier
- (Portugal) Paulo Bento
- (Portugal) Carlos Gomes
- (Romania) Marius Lăcătuș
- (Romania) Horațiu Moldovan
- (Romania) Daniel Paraschiv
- (Romania) Nicolae Simatoc
- (Russia) Viktor Onopko
- (Senegal) Ibrahima Baldé
- (Serbia) Luka Ilić
- (Serbia) Slaviša Jokanović
- (Serbia) Albert Nađ
- (Serbia) Veljko Paunović
- (Serbia) Đorđe Tomić
- (Slovakia) Erik Jirka
- (Slovakia) Peter Dubovský
- (Spain) Adrián López
- (Spain) Antón
- (Spain) Argila
- (Spain) Armando Álvarez
- (Spain) Iván Ania
- (Spain) Luis Aragonés
- (Spain) Bango
- (Spain) Berto
- (Spain) Carlos
- (Spain) José Carrete
- (Spain) Santi Cazorla
- (Spain) César Martín
- (Spain) Thomas Christiansen
- (Spain) Cristóbal Parralo
- (Spain) Emilín
- (Spain) Vicente Engonga
- (Spain) Esteban
- (Spain) Enrique Galán
- (Spain) Galé
- (Spain) Chus Herrera
- (Spain) Herrerita
- (Spain) Isidro Lángara
- (Spain) José María
- (Spain) Luis Manuel
- (Spain) Marianín
- (Spain) Julio Marigil
- (Spain) Juan Mata
- (Spain) Michu
- (Spain) Juan Luis Mora
- (Spain) Oli
- (Spain) Óscar Álvarez
- (Spain) Paquito
- (Spain) Antonio Rivas
- (Spain) Enrique Soladrero
- (Spain) Tensi
- (Spain) Francisco Uría
- (Spain) José Luis Zabala
- (Socialist Federal Republic of Yugoslavia) Milovan Đorić
- (Socialist Federal Republic of Yugoslavia) Ratomir Dujković
- (Ukraine) Andriy Lunin
- (Uruguay) Thiago Borbas
- (Uruguay) Nicolás Fonseca
- (Uruguay) Juan González
- (Uruguay) Federico Viñas
- (Venezuela) Rafael Ponzo
- (Venezuela) Salomón Rondón

== Personnel ==
=== Board of directors ===
Office	Name
President	(Mexico) Martín Peláez
Vice president	(Spain) Manuel Paredes
Director	(Spain) Fernando Corral Mestas (Mexico) Pedro Cedillo (Mexico) Gerardo Cabrera Acosta (Mexico) José Ramón Fernández
Responsible for institutional relations	(Spain) César Martín

Last updated: 7 April 2026
Source: Real Oviedo (in Spanish)

== Coaches ==
Dates	Coach
1926–27	(England) Fred Pentland
1927–28	(England) Frank Burton
1928–29	(Czechoslovakia) Antonín Fivébr
1929–31	(Ireland) Patrick O'Connell
1931–33	(Spain) Vicente Tonijuán
1933–35	(Spain) Emilio Sampere
1935–36	(Spain) José María Peña
1940–41	(Spain) Cristóbal Martí
1941–42	(Spain) Óscar Álvarez
1942–47	(Spain) Manuel Meana
1947–48	(Spain) Francisco Gamborena
1948–50	(Spain) Juan Urquizu
1950–51	(Spain) Patricio Caicedo
1951–54	(Spain) Luis Urquiri
1954–55	(Spain) Domènec Balmanya
1955	(Spain) Óscar Álvarez
1955–56	(Spain) Luis Pasarín
1956–57	(Spain) Eduardo Toba
1957	(Spain) Argila
1957–59	(Argentina) Abel Picabéa
1959	(Spain) Luis Pasarín
1959–60	(Spain) Argila
1960–61	(Spain) Sabino Barinaga
1961	(Spain) Argila
1961–62	(Spain) Óscar Álvarez
1962	(Spain) Antón
1962–63	(Spain) Juan Ochoantezana
1963–64	(Spain) Enrique Orizaola
1964	(Spain) Eduardo Toba
1964–65	(Spain) Enrique Martín
1965	(Spain) José Luis Diestro
1965–66	(Spain) Francisco Antúnez
1966	(Spain) Antón
1966–67	(Spain) Juan Rodríguez Aretio
1967–68	(Spain) Juan Ochoantezana

Dates	Coach
1968	(Spain) Toni Cuervo
1968–69	(Spain) Ramón Cobo
1969	(Spain) Pedro Eguíluz
1969–70	(Spain) Enrique Casas
1970	(Spain) Horacio Leiva
1970–71	(Spain) García de Andoin
1971	(Spain) Toni Cuervo
1971–73	(Spain) Eduardo Toba
1973–74	(Spain) Sabino Barinaga
1974–76	(Spain) Vicente Miera
1976–77	(Spain) Toni Cuervo
1977–78	(Spain) Manuel Ruiz Sosa
1978	(Spain) Sabino Barinaga
1978–79	(Spain) Lalo
1979	(Spain) José María (Spain) José Luis Diestro
1979–81	(Spain) Nando Yosu
1981–82	(Spain) José Víctor Rodríguez
1982–83	(Spain) José María
1983–84	(Spain) Luis Costa
1984–86	(Spain) José Luis Romero
1986	(Spain) Antonio Ruiz
1986–87	(Spain) José Carrete
1987–89	(Spain) Vicente Miera
1989–93	(Spain) Javier Irureta
1993–95	(Federal Republic of Yugoslavia) Radomir Antić
1995–96	(Federal Republic of Yugoslavia) Ivica Brzić
1996–97	(Spain) Juan Manuel Lillo
1997	(Spain) José Antonio Novo
1997–98	(Uruguay) Óscar Tabárez
1998–99	(Spain) Fernando Vázquez
1999–00	(Spain) Luis Aragonés
2000–01	(Federal Republic of Yugoslavia) Radomir Antić
2001–02	(Spain) Enrique Marigil
2002–03	(Spain) Vicente González-Villamil
2003	(Spain) Miguel Sánchez

Dates	Coach
2003–06	(Spain) Antonio Rivas
2006–07	(Spain) Toño Velázquez
2007	(Spain) Ramiro Solís
2007	(Spain) Ismael Díaz
2007–08	(Spain) Lobo Carrasco
2008	(Spain) Fermín Álvarez
2008–09	(Spain) Raúl González
2009	(Spain) Fermín Álvarez
2009–10	(Spain) Pichi Lucas
2010–11	(Spain) José Manuel Martínez
2011–12	(Spain) Pacheta
2012–13	(Spain) Félix Sarriugarte
2013–14	(Spain) José Carlos Granero
2014	(Spain) Roberto Robles
2014–16	(Argentina) Sergio Egea
2016	(Spain) David Generelo
2016–17	(Spain) Fernando Hierro
2017–19	(Spain) Juan Antonio Anquela
2019	(Argentina) Sergio Egea
2019–20	(Spain) Javi Rozada
2020–22	(Spain) José Ángel Ziganda
2022	(Spain) Bolo
2022–23	(Spain) Álvaro Cervera
2023–24	(Spain) Luis Carrión
2024–25	(Spain) Javier Calleja
2025	(Serbia) Veljko Paunović
2025	(Spain) Luis Carrión
2025–26	(Uruguay) Guillermo Almada
2026	(Spain) Julián Calero
2026–	(Spain) Raúl González

== Rivalries ==
The Asturian derby has been closely contested throughout its history and the two teams have met 117 times in all competitions. Real Oviedo have won 49 times, while Sporting de Gijón have done so in 38 games; 30 draws have been produced.

Sporting won the first match ever played, a 2–1 win for the Regional Championships on 6 December 1926. The first top flight derby took place during the 1944–45 season, and honours were split over the two games: Oviedo won its home fixture 2–1, but lost by a record 0–6 at El Molinón.

The inaugural second level season, 1929, also brought two local derbies – Oviedo thrashed Sporting 6–2 at home, while Sporting won 3–2 in the return fixture. On 15 March 1998, the last contest in the top level took place, and Oviedo emerged victorious 2–1 at the Tartiere, eventually managing to stay afloat (only through the play-offs though) whilst the Rojiblancos suffered direct relegation as 20th and last.

== Supporters ==
After the first relegation in its history to Tercera División, the historical record of the category was established in the 2003–04 season, with 10,759 season ticket holders, up to that time, the record was for Málaga CF in 1995 with 4,200. Oviedo fans have also established some other Spanish records, such as the record attendance for a Tercera División regular game (16,573 people vs Oviedo ACF) or the record attendance for a Segunda B promotion game (27,214 people vs Mallorca B).

Real Oviedo achieved its season ticket holders record in the 2023–24 season with 21,517 people. Their fans are gathered in more than 90 "peñas" (officially, club-affiliated supporters' groups), which are organized by APARO (Asociación de Peñas Azules del Real Oviedo). Oviedo's most notorious and hardcore "peña" is Symmachiarii, considered as the club "ultras".

Real Oviedo supporters maintain friendly relations with fans of Deportivo La Coruña, Real Valladolid and Sevilla and internationally with fans of Genoa, Apollon Smyrnis F.C. and Žilina.

== Sponsorships and manufacturers ==
Period	Kit manufacturer	Shirt sponsor
1981–1982	Puma	–
1982–1985	Meyba	FIAT
1985–1989	Juan Casabella	CLAS
1989–1990	Eder	CLAS
1990–1991	Kelme	CLAS
1991–1993	Kelme	Cajastur
1993–1998	Joluvi	Cajastur
1998–2000	Erima	—
2000–2001	Puma	—
2001–2005	Puma	Principality of Asturias
2003–2008	Joluvi	Principality of Asturias
2008–2012	Nike	Principality of Asturias
2012–2014	Joma	—
2014–2015	Joma	ASAC Comunicaciones
2015–2016	Hummel	GAM
2016–2017	Adidas	Procoin
2017–2018	Adidas	Huawei
2018–2019	Adidas	—
2019–2020	Adidas	Oviedo
2020–2021	Adidas	NMR
2021–2026	Adidas	Digi
2026–	Adidas	Central Lechera Asturiana

== Real Oviedo B ==
The reserve team, which plays since 2022 in the fourth level (Segunda Federación), was formerly named Vetusta. Vetusta was also the original name of the team, before the Royal Spanish Football Federation decree which banned unique reserve club names in the early 1990s.

== Real Oviedo (women) ==
On 28 August 2017, women's club Oviedo Moderno CF signed an agreement with Real Oviedo for using their name and their blue and white colors, instead of their classic black and green, since the 2017–18 season, with the aim to be completely integrated into the structure of the club for the 2018–19 season onwards. The club formerly used the blue and white colors for the 2016–17 promotion play-offs.

Oviedo currently plays in Segunda Federación, the Spanish third tier.
