= Óscar Álvarez (footballer, born 1902) =

Spanish footballer and manager

Personal information
- Full name: Óscar Álvarez González
- Date of birth: 1 May 1902
- Place of birth: Oviedo, Asturias, Spain
- Date of death: 11 June 1972 (aged 70)
- Position: Goalkeeper

Senior career*
Years	Team	Apps	(Gls)
1924–1926	Stadium Ovetense		
1927–1936	Real Oviedo		

International career
1922–1923	Asturias	7	(0)
1924	Spain	0	(0)

Managerial career
- 1940–1941: Racing de Ferrol
- 1941–1942: Real Oviedo
- 1943–1944: Real Avilés CF
- 1951–1953: Caudal Deportivo
- 1954–1955: Real Avilés CF
- 1955–1956: Real Oviedo
- 1957–1958: CP La Felguera
- * Club domestic league appearances and goals

Óscar Álvarez González (1 May 1902 – 11 June 1972) was a Spanish footballer who played as a goalkeeper for Real Oviedo. He later worked as a manager. He was also a member of the Spanish football squad that competed in the 1924 Summer Olympics, but he did not play in any matches.

== Club career ==
Born in Oviedo, Óscar started his football career in his hometown club Stadium Ovetense, where he began playing as a goalkeeper by chance, replacing a teammate who had been injured during a match, and he soon demonstrated great qualities that made him stand out between the posts. In 1926, he was one of the main promoters of the merger between Stadium and the neighboring club Deportivo Oviedo, which resulted in the birth of Real Oviedo.

Óscar was named the club's first-ever captain and he defended the Real Oviedo shirt from the first day of its existence until the Spanish Civil War interrupted football competitions in 1936. During this period, he recovered in 1930 from a broken collarbone that threatened the end of his football career. In total, he played 198 official matches; 103 in the League, 3 in promotion matches, 30 in the Copa del Rey, and 62 in the Regional Championship.

At the end of the war he was imprisoned and later released for having clearly positioned himself in favor of the republic.

== International career ==
Being a Real Oviedo player, Óscar was eligible to play for the Asturias team, being one of the eleven footballers that played in the team's first-ever game on 4 June 1922, in a friendly against St Mirren F.C., which ended in a 3–7 loss. The regional Asturian team then played seven official games between 1922 and 1926 in the Prince of Asturias Cup, winning the 1922–23 edition, largely thanks to Óscar's heroic performances in the semifinals, keeping a clean-sheet in a 1–1 win over Catalonia, which was mostly made-up of players of the so-called golden generation of FC Barcelona, such as Ricardo Zamora, Vicente Martínez, and Josep Samitier. In the final on 25 February 1923, he started in a 3–1 victory over Galicia at Coia.

Óscar was a member of the Spanish football squad that competed in the 1924 Summer Olympics, but he did not play in any matches. In total, he was called up for the national team 11 times, 9 being a Stadium player and 2 as an Oviedo player, but he was unable to make his debut because of the great competition that there was for the goalkeeping position, where mainly Ricardo Zamora blocked his way.

== Managerial career ==
Óscar began his managerial career at the helm of Racing de Ferrol, which he coached in 1940–41. In July 1941, he took charge of Real Oviedo, replacing Cristóbal Martí to become the club's 10th coach, a position that he held for only a year until 1942, when he was replaced by Manuel Meana. After another one-season stint at Real Avilés CF (1943–44), he gave up from coaching, but eventually returned following a 7-year hiatus to take charge of another Asturian team in the Segunda Division, Caudal Deportivo, and this time he lasted two seasons. He then returned to Real Avilés in 1954, and then to Real Oviedo in July 1955, but left in October after only three months at the helm of the club. His last season as coach was in 1957–58 with CP La Felguera.

== Honours ==
Asturias XI

- Prince of Asturias Cup:
  - Champions (1): 1922–23
