= Dieguito (footballer, born 2005) =

Spanish footballer (born 2005)

Personal information
- Full name: Diego Menéndez Secades
- Date of birth: 27 April 2005 (age 21)
- Place of birth: Oviedo, Spain
- Height: 1.90 m (6 ft 3 in)
- Position: Attacking midfielder

Team information
- Current team: Oviedo
- Number: 28

Youth career
- 2012–2023: Oviedo

Senior career*
Years	Team	Apps	(Gls)
2023–	Oviedo B	88	(16)
2023–	Oviedo	1	(0)
- * Club domestic league appearances and goals as of 29 August 2026

Diego Menéndez Secades (born 27 April 2005), known as Dieguito, is a Spanish footballer who plays as an attacking midfielder for Real Oviedo.

== Career ==
Born in Oviedo, Asturias, Dieguito joined Real Oviedo's youth sides in 2012, aged seven. He made his senior debut with the reserves on 3 September 2023, coming on as a half-time substitute for Charbel Wehbe in a 3–1 Segunda Federación home loss to Racing Club Villalbés.

Dieguito quickly established himself as a regular starter for Vetusta, and scored his first goal on 2 December 2023, netting the side's fifth in a 5–0 home routing of CD Covadonga. He made his first team debut three days later, replacing Sebas Moyano late into a 2–1 away loss to CD Castellón, for the season's Copa del Rey.

Dieguito continued to feature with the B's in the following years, and renewed his contract with the Carbayones until 2028 on 6 March 2026. He was promoted to the first team in July, and made his professional debut on 29 August, replacing Dani Villahermosa late into a 1–0 Segunda División away win over Albacete Balompié.
