= Luis Manuel (footballer, born 1967) =

Spanish footballer

Personal information
- Full name: Luis Manuel Arias Vega
- Date of birth: 29 March 1967 (age 59)
- Place of birth: Oviedo, Spain
- Height: 1.81 m (5 ft 11 1/2 in)
- Position: Centre-back

Youth career
- 1975–1985: Oviedo

Senior career*
Years	Team	Apps	(Gls)
1985–1986	Oviedo B		
1985–1995	Oviedo	213	(1)
1995–1998	Salamanca	36	(0)
1998–2000	Toledo	77	(2)
2000–2001	Ponferradina	30	(1)
2001–2003	Águilas		

International career
1989	Spain U21	1	(0)
1989–1992	Spain	4	(0)
- * Club domestic league appearances and goals

Luis Manuel Arias Vega (born 29 March 1967), known as Luis Manuel, is a Spanish former professional footballer who played as a central defender.

He played 195 La Liga matches over nine seasons, with Oviedo and Salamanca.

== Club career ==
Born in Oviedo, Asturias, Luis Manuel spent most of his career with local Real Oviedo, playing nine full seasons with the first team and seven in La Liga. His debut in the competition came on 3 September 1988, in a 1–0 home win against Real Sociedad.

Luis Manuel appeared once in the UEFA Cup with his main club, the 1–0 home victory over Genoa CFC in the 1991–92 edition (3–2 aggregate loss). He left in 1995, going on to represent at the professional level UD Salamanca and CD Toledo – the former side also in the top tier – and retiring in 2003 at the age of 36.

In January 2004, Luis Manuel returned to Oviedo, being appointed general manager.

== International career ==
Luis Manuel earned four caps for Spain in two years. His debut came on 13 December 1989 in a friendly with Switzerland, coming on as a second-half substitute for Genar Andrinúa in the 2–1 win in Santa Cruz de Tenerife.
