= Juan Sarrachini =

Argentine footballer

Sarrachini
Personal information
- Full name: Juan Fernando Sarrachini Donati
- Date of birth: 29 January 1946
- Place of birth: Santa Fe, Argentina
- Date of death: 27 January 2012 (aged 65)
- Place of death: Villa Amelia
- Height: 1.74 m (5 ft 9 in)
- Position: Midfielder

Senior career*
Years	Team	Apps	(Gls)
1965–1969	Newell's Old Boys		
1969–1970	Mallorca	14	(1)
1970–1974	Hércules		
1974–1975	Almería		
- * Club domestic league appearances and goals

Juan Fernando Sarrachini Donati (29 January 1946 – 27 January 2012) was an Argentine footballer who played as a midfielder.

== Football career ==
In the 1969–70 season played in La Liga with Mallorca. A season later he went to Hércules, where he played 4 seasons in Second Division. Hércules signed on July 23, 1970, at Sarrachini from RCD Mallorca and José Luque Puerta from Atlético Baleares. These signings were thanks to the efforts of the technical secretary of Hércules, Jesús Berenguer. In the 1973–74 season won promotion to La Liga. Arsenio Iglesias told him not to play in La Liga, and the player went to AD Almería, where he played one year. He died in January 2012 in the Argentine town of Villa Amelia.
