= José María (footballer, born 1942) =

Spanish footballer

Personal information
- Full name: José María García Lavilla
- Date of birth: 23 May 1942
- Place of birth: Pola de Siero, Spain
- Position: Forward

Youth career
- –1957: Club Siero
- 1957–61: Oviedo

Senior career*
Years	Team	Apps	(Gls)
1961–65	Oviedo	108	(23)
1965–76	Espanyol	300	(50)

International career
1964	Spain B	1	(2)
1966–67	Spain	6	(1)

Managerial career
- 1979: Oviedo
- 1982–83: Oviedo
- * Club domestic league appearances and goals

José María García Lavilla, also known as José María (born 23 May 1942), is a Spanish former footballer who played as a forward and former coach. He played for Real Oviedo, RCD Espanyol and the Spain national football team.

Real Oviedo's high point was a best-ever third position in 1962–63 (ranking joint-first with Real Madrid after the first 15 rounds). However, the club had been experiencing financial difficulties and, under Enrique Orizaola, had to sell key players Sánchez Lage, Paquito García and finally José María himself.
