= Enrique Galán =

Spanish footballer

Personal information
- Full name: Enrique Galán Bayarri
- Date of birth: 6 April 1946 (age 80)
- Place of birth: Almàssera, Spain
- Position: Striker

Youth career
- Valencia

Senior career*
Years	Team	Apps	(Gls)
1963–1966	Valencia B	15	(3)
1966–1967	Alcoyano		
1967–1968	Badajoz	18	(10)
1968–1978	Oviedo	295	(121)
1978–1980	Getafe	31	(11)

International career
1973–1974	Spain	2	(0)
- * Club domestic league appearances and goals

Enrique Galán Bayarri (born 6 April 1946) is a Spanish retired footballer who played as a striker. He spent the most of his career associated with Real Oviedo, which he represented for ten seasons.
