= 1957–58 Segunda División =

27th season of the second-tier football league in Spain

Segunda División
- Season: 1957–58
- Champions: Oviedo; Real Betis
- Promoted: Oviedo; Real Betis
- Relegated: Caudal; Recreativo; Cultural Leonesa; Xerez; Eibar; Alicante; La Felguera; Alcoyano
- Matches: 612
- Goals: 1,852 (3.03 per match)
- Top goalscorer: Lalo; Chelo; Jordi Vila (19 goals)
- Best goalkeeper: Pedro Caldentey (0.59 goals/match)
- Biggest home win: Tarrasa 10–1 La Felguera (18 May 1958)
- Biggest away win: Basconia 1–6 Indauchu (15 December 1957)
- Highest scoring: Tarrasa 10–1 La Felguera (18 May 1958)

The 1957–58 Segunda División season was the 27th since its establishment and was played between 15 September 1957 and 1 June 1958.

== Overview before the season ==
36 teams joined the league, including two relegated from the 1956–57 La Liga and 4 promoted from the 1956–57 Tercera División.

Relegated from La Liga

- Deportivo La Coruña
- Condal

Promoted from Tercera División

- Basconia
- Alcoyano
- Recreativo
- Plus Ultra

== Group North ==
=== Teams ===
Location of teams in Segunda División 1957-58 Group North

Club	City	Stadium
Deportivo Alavés	Vitoria	Mendizorroza
Real Avilés CF	Avilés	La Exposición
CD Basconia	Basauri	Pedro López Cortázar
Caudal Deportivo	Mieres	El Batán
CD Condal	Barcelona	Les Corts
Cultural Leonesa	León	La Puentecilla
RC Deportivo La Coruña	La Coruña	Riazor
SD Eibar	Eibar	Ipurúa
Club Ferrol	Ferrol	Manuel Rivera
Gerona CF	Gerona	Vista Alegre
SD Indauchu	Bilbao	Garellano
CP La Felguera	La Felguera, Langreo	La Barraca
Real Oviedo CF	Oviedo	Buenavista
AD Rayo Vallecano	Madrid	Vallecas
CD Sabadell FC	Sabadell	Cruz Alta
Real Santander SD	Santander	El Sardinero
Club Sestao	Sestao	Las Llanas
CD Tarrasa	Tarrasa	Obispo Irurita

=== League table ===
Pos	Team	Pld	W	D	L	GF	GA	GD	Pts	Promotion, qualification or relegation
1	Oviedo (P)	34	21	8	5	73	22	+51	50 (Note: Oviedo finished ahead of Sabadell on overall goal difference)	Promotion to La Liga
2	Sabadell	34	23	4	7	61	28	+33	50	
3	Real Santander	34	18	4	12	58	46	+12	40	
4	Indauchu	34	16	7	11	64	41	+23	39	
5	Condal	34	16	5	13	56	40	+16	37	
6	Rayo Vallecano	34	12	10	12	44	43	+1	34	
7	Alavés	34	13	7	14	47	44	+3	33 (Note: Alavés finished ahead of Basconia and Girona on head-to-head points: Alavés 5 pts, Basconia 4 pts, Girona 3 pts)	
8	Basconia	34	12	9	13	39	56	−17	33	
9	Girona	34	14	5	15	42	57	−15	33	
10	Sestao	34	12	8	14	40	48	−8	32 (Note: Sestao finished ahead of Avilés, Ferrol and Deportivo La Coruña on head-to-head points: Sestao 7 pts, Avilés 7 pts, Ferrol 7 pts, Deportivo La Coruña 3 pts. Sestao finished ahead of Avilés and Ferrol on head-to-head goal difference)	
11	Avilés	34	12	8	14	52	70	−18	32	
12	Ferrol	34	13	6	15	45	58	−13	32	
13	Deportivo La Coruña (O)	34	14	4	16	52	52	0	32	Qualification for the relegation playoffs
14	Tarrasa (O)	34	12	6	16	57	61	−4	30	Qualification for the relegation playoffs
15	Caudal (R)	34	11	7	16	34	40	−6	29	Relegation to Tercera División
16	Cultural Leonesa (R)	34	11	6	17	38	48	−10	28	Relegation to Tercera División
17	Eibar (R)	34	8	9	17	39	55	−16	25	Relegation to Tercera División
18	La Felguera (R)	34	8	7	19	38	70	−32	23	Relegation to Tercera División

Source: BDFútbol
Rules for classification: 1) points; 2) head-to-head points; 3) head-to-head goal difference; 4) goal difference; 5) number of goals scored
(O) Play-off winners; (P) Promoted; (R) Relegated

=== Results ===
Home \ Away	ALA	AVI	BAS	CAU	CON	LEO	DEP	EIB	GIR	IND	FEL	OVI	RFE	RAC	RAY	SAB	SES	TRR
Alavés	—	0–2	3–1	1–0	3–0	1–2	3–1	3–2	3–0	0–0	0–1	2–2	1–2	2–1	1–1	0–3	2–0	5–0
Avilés	2–2	—	5–2	2–0	1–2	1–0	1–1	3–2	3–1	6–2	1–0	0–5	3–3	0–0	1–0	2–2	2–3	2–1
Basconia	1–1	3–2	—	1–1	1–0	1–1	1–5	1–1	3–0	1–6	1–1	1–0	3–0	0–1	0–0	2–0	1–0	4–0
Caudal	0–1	2–2	0–1	—	2–0	1–0	1–0	3–0	0–1	2–0	2–2	0–0	4–0	1–1	3–1	0–0	2–1	1–0
Condal	0–1	5–1	5–0	1–2	—	2–1	5–0	2–0	4–2	1–0	0–1	1–1	4–1	2–1	2–0	3–0	2–2	0–0
Cultural Leonesa	1–0	1–1	1–2	4–0	0–2	—	4–0	0–2	2–3	2–0	3–0	2–0	1–0	1–3	0–0	0–1	0–0	3–2
Deportivo La Coruña	2–0	1–2	2–1	1–2	3–1	3–0	—	2–1	5–0	1–1	3–0	2–0	0–1	2–6	0–0	2–1	5–0	2–1
Eibar	0–0	2–0	5–0	1–0	1–2	4–4	3–1	—	1–2	1–0	1–1	2–2	0–3	2–0	1–2	2–0	1–1	1–3
Gerona	3–2	6–0	0–0	2–1	0–0	3–1	2–1	0–0	—	1–0	3–1	0–0	0–0	1–0	2–0	0–2	5–1	3–0
Indauchu	2–0	6–0	1–2	1–0	1–2	5–0	1–0	0–0	3–0	—	3–0	1–0	4–0	3–0	5–2	2–0	2–2	3–1
La Felguera	2–2	2–0	3–2	1–0	1–1	0–1	1–0	1–1	2–0	0–3	—	0–1	3–1	2–3	2–2	1–2	1–3	0–1
Oviedo	3–0	3–1	0–0	4–0	1–0	2–0	5–1	2–0	3–0	5–0	3–1	—	4–1	1–0	2–2	1–0	2–0	3–0
Ferrol	2–1	0–0	0–1	2–0	2–0	1–0	2–1	3–0	3–0	5–1	3–2	1–4	—	1–4	2–1	1–3	0–0	1–1
Real Santander	3–2	3–1	1–1	2–1	3–1	3–0	2–3	2–1	3–0	0–0	3–2	1–5	1–0	—	3–2	3–0	2–0	0–2
Rayo Vallecano	3–0	3–2	2–0	0–0	4–2	1–0	0–0	1–1	4–0	1–1	5–0	0–2	2–0	1–0	—	0–1	1–0	2–0
Sabadell	1–0	5–1	5–0	2–1	1–0	3–0	2–1	3–0	3–1	2–2	3–1	1–0	3–0	3–0	1–0	—	2–1	3–0
Sestao	0–1	0–1	1–0	1–0	0–2	0–2	2–0	1–0	2–0	1–1	3–2	1–1	4–2	3–2	3–0	0–0	—	2–3
Tarrasa	1–4	2–1	3–1	4–2	3–2	1–1	0–1	3–0	4–1	3–0	10–1	2–2	2–2	0–1	2–2	1–3	1–2	—

Source: BDFútbol
Legend: Blue = home team win; Yellow = draw; Red = away team win.

=== Top goalscorers ===
Goalscorers	Goals	Team
(Spain) Lalo	19	Oviedo
(Spain) Chelo	19	Tarrasa
(Spain) Xanín	16	Sabadell
(Spain) Paulino Jiménez	16	Tarrasa
(Spain) Enrique Vicedo	13	Real Santander

=== Top goalkeepers ===
Goalkeeper	Goals	Matches	Average	Team
(Spain) Pedro Caldentey	19	32	0.59	Oviedo
(Spain) Ricardo Zamora	20	29	0.69	Sabadell
(Spain) Juan Antonio Celdrán	21	21	1	Condal
(Spain) José María Cobo	26	23	1.13	Indauchu
(Spain) Carlos Guinea	40	34	1.18	Caudal

== Group South ==
=== Teams ===
Location of teams in Segunda División 1957-58 Group South
Canary Islands

Club	City	Stadium
CD Alcoyano	Alcoy	El Collao
Alicante CF	Alicante	Bardín
Atlético Ceuta	Ceuta	Alfonso Murube
CD Badajoz	Badajoz	El Vivero
Real Betis Balompié	Seville	Heliópolis
Cádiz CF	Cádiz	Ramón de Carranza
Córdoba CF	Córdoba	El Arcángel
CD Eldense	Elda	El Parque
CF Extremadura	Almendralejo	Francisco de la Hera
Hércules CF	Alicante	La Viña
Jerez CD	Jerez de la Frontera	Domecq
Levante UD	Valencia	Vallejo
CD Málaga	Málaga	La Rosaleda Stadium
Real Murcia	Murcia	La Condomina
AD Plus Ultra	Madrid	Campo de Ciudad Lineal
RC Recreativo de Huelva	Huelva	Municipal
CD San Fernando	San Fernando	Marqués de Varela
CD Tenerife	Santa Cruz de Tenerife	Heliodoro Rodríguez López

=== League table ===
Pos	Team	Pld	W	D	L	GF	GA	GD	Pts	Promotion, qualification or relegation
1	Real Betis (P)	34	18	6	10	66	42	+24	42	Promotion to La Liga
2	Tenerife	34	15	8	11	61	40	+21	38 (Note: Tenerife finished ahead of Murcia on head-to-head points: Tenerife–Murcia 5–1, Murcia–Tenerife 0–0)	
3	Murcia	34	15	8	11	54	42	+12	38	
4	Levante	34	15	7	12	65	48	+17	37	
5	Hércules	34	15	6	13	57	54	+3	36 (Note: Hércules finished ahead of San Fernando and Plus Ultra on head-to-head points: Hércules 5 pts, San Fernando 4 pts, Plus Ultra 3 pts)	
6	San Fernando	34	14	8	12	51	45	+6	36	
7	Plus Ultra	34	13	10	11	55	53	+2	36	
8	Eldense	34	14	7	13	57	68	−11	35 (Note: Eldense finished ahead of Extremadura, Cádiz, Córdoba and Badajoz on head-to-head points: Eldense 10 pts, Extremadura 8 pts, Cádiz 8 pts, Córdoba 8 pts, Badajoz 6 pts. Extremadura finished ahead of Cádiz and Córdoba on head-to-head goal difference)	
9	Extremadura	34	15	5	14	51	63	−12	35	
10	Cádiz	34	14	7	13	46	61	−15	35	
11	Córdoba	34	14	7	13	57	60	−3	35	
12	Badajoz	34	14	7	13	57	52	+5	35	
13	Atlético Ceuta (O)	34	13	7	14	43	48	−5	33	Qualification for the relegation playoffs
14	Málaga (O)	34	13	6	15	58	54	+4	32 (Note: Málaga finished ahead of Recreativo and Xerez on head-to-head points: Málaga 6 pts, Recreativo 4 pts, Xerez 2 pts)	Qualification for the relegation playoffs
15	Recreativo (R)	34	13	6	15	49	53	−4	32	Relegation to Tercera División
16	Xerez (R)	34	12	8	14	50	46	+4	32	Relegation to Tercera División
17	Alicante (R)	34	9	5	20	42	64	−22	23	Relegation to Tercera División
18	Alcoyano (R)	34	9	4	21	54	80	−26	22	Relegation to Tercera División

Source: BDFútbol
Rules for classification: 1) points; 2) head-to-head points; 3) head-to-head goal difference; 4) goal difference; 5) number of goals scored
(O) Play-off winners; (P) Promoted; (R) Relegated

=== Results ===
Home \ Away	ALC	ALI	CEU	BAD	CAD	COR	ELD	EXT	HER	LEV	CDM	MUR	RMC	BET	REC	SFE	TEN	XER
Alcoyano	—	1–2	3–1	0–1	4–0	1–4	4–2	1–2	1–1	1–2	5–1	1–2	1–1	2–0	3–2	2–0	2–0	3–0
Alicante	5–1	—	3–1	0–2	1–0	2–1	1–1	3–3	1–2	1–3	2–1	1–2	1–2	0–2	3–0	2–0	2–0	2–2
Atlético Ceuta	3–0	2–0	—	3–1	1–1	3–2	2–1	4–1	2–1	0–0	0–1	1–0	3–0	1–1	1–0	2–2	1–0	1–0
Badajoz	6–0	6–1	2–0	—	1–5	3–1	0–1	5–2	2–2	0–0	2–1	1–1	5–2	2–0	2–1	2–2	1–0	3–0
Cádiz	2–2	2–0	2–1	0–0	—	3–0	2–2	2–1	2–1	3–1	2–2	0–0	1–0	2–1	3–2	1–0	2–1	1–0
Córdoba	4–1	0–0	4–2	2–1	2–0	—	2–2	0–0	2–2	2–1	5–1	1–1	2–2	0–2	1–0	2–1	1–1	2–0
Eldense	5–3	2–0	2–2	1–0	5–1	1–3	—	2–1	0–0	3–1	2–1	2–1	2–1	3–0	2–0	2–1	3–3	2–0
Extremadura	2–1	2–1	2–1	0–0	2–0	3–0	5–2	—	2–1	4–1	0–0	2–1	2–1	0–1	2–1	1–0	2–1	5–0
Hércules	4–2	3–1	4–0	4–0	1–0	1–0	3–1	5–2	—	3–1	1–1	0–1	1–0	2–0	1–3	4–2	1–0	3–2
Levante	2–0	4–1	2–2	4–0	5–0	4–3	6–1	4–0	4–1	—	2–1	1–1	1–1	1–2	3–0	1–0	1–0	2–1
Málaga	2–2	2–0	1–0	3–0	0–2	1–2	6–1	2–0	3–0	1–1	—	3–0	3–0	2–2	4–0	4–0	0–0	4–3
Murcia	5–4	1–0	2–2	1–2	6–2	0–1	2–1	4–0	2–0	3–2	1–0	—	6–1	2–1	7–0	0–0	0–0	1–0
Plus Ultra	3–0	2–0	2–0	0–0	4–1	3–4	1–1	2–0	3–3	4–0	2–1	0–0	—	3–3	2–0	3–2	2–0	2–0
Real Betis	3–1	3–1	0–1	6–3	1–1	2–1	2–1	6–1	3–0	1–0	5–2	2–0	3–1	—	0–2	3–0	4–1	3–0
Recreativo	2–0	1–1	3–0	1–0	4–1	3–1	4–0	1–1	3–1	2–1	2–0	2–0	2–4	2–1	—	1–1	1–2	1–1
San Fernando	3–0	2–1	2–0	2–1	2–1	4–1	3–1	3–0	2–1	2–2	3–1	3–0	3–0	2–2	1–0	—	2–1	1–1
Tenerife	4–1	3–2	2–0	3–2	4–1	5–0	5–0	4–1	2–0	2–1	3–0	5–1	2–2	2–1	2–2	2–0	—	0–0
Xerez	4–1	5–1	1–0	3–1	4–0	4–1	2–0	4–0	4–0	2–1	2–3	1–0	2–0	0–0	1–1	0–0	1–1	—

Source: BDFútbol
Legend: Blue = home team win; Yellow = draw; Red = away team win.

=== Top goalscorers ===
Goalscorers	Goals	Team
(Spain) Jordi Vila	19	Real Betis
(Spain) José Paredes	18	Levante
(Spain) Julito	17	Tenerife
(Spain) José Saborido	17	Extremadura
(Spain) Quirro	17	Cádiz

=== Top goalkeepers ===
Goalkeeper	Goals	Matches	Average	Team
(Spain) Luis Menéndez	19	20	0.95	Real Betis
(Spain) Juan García	36	31	1.16	Murcia
(Spain) Santi Lafuente	40	34	1.18	Tenerife
(Spain) Rafael Ripoll	28	23	1.22	Levante
(Spain) José García	34	27	1.26	Badajoz

== Relegation playoffs ==
=== First leg ===
21 June 1958	Sans	2–3	Tarrasa	Barcelona
	Borrell 40'; Alberto 51'	Report	Paulino 6'; Epi 25'; Chelo 72'	Stadium: Les Corts; Referee: Urdax Herrero

22 June 1958	Orense	0–2	Deportivo La Coruña	Ourense
		Report	Mendonça 61', 82'	Stadium: O Couto; Referee: Balaguer Escuder

22 June 1958	Cartagena	2–2	Atlético Ceuta	Cartagena
	Carriega 20', 30'	Report	Muñoz 35'; Peña 88'	Stadium: El Almarjal; Referee: García Rodríguez

22 June 1958	Castellón	1–0	Málaga	Castellón de la Plana
	Casanova 52'	Report		Stadium: Castalia; Referee: López Montenegro

=== Second leg ===
29 June 1958	Deportivo La Coruña	2–1 (4–1 agg.)	Orense	A Coruña
	Amoedo 1', 5'	Report	Suárez 37'	Stadium: Riazor; Referee: Santamaría Alonso

29 June 1958	Atlético Ceuta	3–0 (5–2 agg.)	Cartagena	Ceuta
	Sebastião 34', 68'; Peña 60'	Report		Stadium: Alfonso Murube; Referee: Pintado Viu

29 June 1958	Málaga	5–0 (5–1 agg.)	Castellón	Málaga
	Madariaga 7', 18', 33'; Bernardi 27'; Carrillo 83'	Report		Stadium: La Rosaleda; Referee: Arrechea Mendiondo

29 June 1958	Tarrasa	0–0 (3–2 agg.)	Sans	Barcelona
		Report		Stadium: Les Corts; Referee: Alfaro Toledo
