= CD Estepona =

Spanish football team

Estepona
- Full name: Club Deportivo Estepona
- Founded: 1947
- Dissolved: 1994
- Ground: Francisco Muñoz Pérez, Estepona, Andalusia, Spain
- Capacity: 4,500
Home colours	Away colours

Club Deportivo Estepona was a Spanish football team based in Estepona, in the autonomous community of Andalucia. Founded in 1942, the club folded in 1994, and held home games at Estadio Francisco Muñoz Pérez, with a capacity of 4,500 people.

== History ==
Founded in 1947, the club first reached the Tercera División in 1966, spending four campaigns in the category before suffering relegation. The return to the fourth tier occurred in 1977, after the league's restructuring, and the club subsequently established itself in the division.

Promoted to Segunda División B in 1989, the club remained five campaigns in the category after suffering relegation in 1994; shortly after, the club suffered an administrative relegation after failing to pay the debts with past players, and subsequently folded.

Another club in the city followed: Unión Estepona CF (founded in 1995 and dissolved in 2014) and CD Estepona FS (founded in 2014 as a replacement for Unión Estepona). Both also reached the national divisions.

== Season to season ==
Season	Tier	Division	Place	Copa del Rey
1949–1964	—	Regional	—	
1964–65	4	1ª Reg.	1st	
1965–66	4	1ª Reg.	1st	
1966–67	3	3ª	8th	
1967–68	3	3ª	7th	
1968–69	3	3ª	13th	
1969–70	3	3ª	9th	First round
1970–71	4	1ª Reg.	3rd	
1971–72	4	1ª Reg.	4th	
1972–73	4	1ª Reg.	4th	
1973–74	4	1ª Reg.	6th	
1974–75	4	1ª Reg.	3rd	
1975–76	4	Reg. Pref.	4th	
1976–77	4	Reg. Pref.	1st	
1977–78	4	3ª	16th	First round
1978–79	4	3ª	19th	

Season	Tier	Division	Place	Copa del Rey
1979–80	4	3ª	7th	First round
1980–81	4	3ª	5th	First round
1981–82	4	3ª	12th	First round
1982–83	4	3ª	10th	
1983–84	4	3ª	5th	
1984–85	4	3ª	13th	Third round
1985–86	4	3ª	15th	
1986–87	4	3ª	15th	
1987–88	4	3ª	4th	
1988–89	4	3ª	1st	
1989–90	3	2ª B	15th	
1990–91	3	2ª B	9th	Third round
1991–92	3	2ª B	13th	Fourth round
1992–93	3	2ª B	13th	Second round
1993–94	3	2ª B	14th	Third round

- 5 seasons in Segunda División B
- 16 seasons in Tercera División
