= CD Santurtzi =

Association football club in Spain

Coordinates: 43.324031°N 3.038345°W

Santurtzi
- Full name: Club Deportivo Santurtzi Kirol Elkartea
- Founded: 1952
- Ground: San Jorge, Santurtzi, Basque Country, Spain
- Capacity: 2,000
- President: Raúl Sáez
- Head coach: Miguel Romillo
- League: Tercera Federación – Group 4
- 2025–26: Tercera Federación – Group 4, 12th of 18
- Website: cdsanturtzike.org
Home colours	Away colours

Club Deportivo Santurtzi Kirol Elkartea is a football team based in Santurtzi in the autonomous community of Basque Country. Founded in 1952, it plays in Tercera Federación – Group 4. Its stadium is San Jorge, with a capacity of 2,000 seats.

== Season to season ==
Season	Tier	Division	Place	Copa del Rey
1954–55	6	3ª Reg.	6th	
1955–56	6	3ª Reg.	2nd	
1956–57	5	2ª Reg.	1st	
1957–58	5	2ª Reg.	1st	
1958–59	4	1ª Reg.	7th	
1959–60	4	1ª Reg.	8th	
1960–61	4	1ª Reg.	1st	
1961–62	3	3ª	12th	
1962–63	3	3ª	4th	
1963–64	3	3ª	4th	
1964–65	3	3ª	9th	
1965–66	3	3ª	7th	
1966–67	3	3ª	10th	
1967–68	3	3ª	11th	
1968–69	4	Reg. Pref.	5th	
1969–70	4	Reg. Pref.	14th	
1970–71	5	1ª Reg.	4th	
1971–72	4	Reg. Pref.	4th	
1972–73	4	Reg. Pref.	2nd	
1973–74	4	Reg. Pref.	4th	

Season	Tier	Division	Place	Copa del Rey
1974–75	4	Reg. Pref.	1st	
1975–76	3	3ª	18th	
1976–77	4	Reg. Pref.	11th	
1977–78	5	Reg. Pref.	13th	
1978–79	5	Reg. Pref.	4th	
1979–80	5	Reg. Pref.	7th	
1980–81	5	Reg. Pref.	7th	
1981–82	5	Reg. Pref.	2nd	
1982–83	4	3ª	11th	
1983–84	4	3ª	1st	
1984–85	4	3ª	13th	Second round
1985–86	4	3ª	3rd	
1986–87	4	3ª	6th	First round
1987–88	4	3ª	6th	First round
1988–89	4	3ª	1st	
1989–90	3	2ª B	12th	
1990–91	3	2ª B	15th	Second round
1991–92	3	2ª B	16th	Second round
1992–93	3	2ª B	20th	First round
1993–94	4	3ª	8th	

Season	Tier	Division	Place	Copa del Rey
1994–95	4	3ª	13th	
1995–96	4	3ª	17th	
1996–97	4	3ª	9th	
1997–98	4	3ª	8th	
1998–99	4	3ª	17th	
1999–2000	4	3ª	9th	
2000–01	5	Reg. Pref.	3rd	
2001–02	5	Reg. Pref.	3rd	
2002–03	5	Div. Hon.	5th	
2003–04	5	Div. Hon.	6th	
2004–05	5	Div. Hon.	1st	
2005–06	4	3ª	12th	
2006–07	4	3ª	7th	
2007–08	4	3ª	9th	
2008–09	4	3ª	14th	
2009–10	4	3ª	12th	
2010–11	4	3ª	18th	
2011–12	5	Div. Hon.	12th	
2012–13	5	Div. Hon.	3rd	
2013–14	5	Div. Hon.	1st	

Season	Tier	Division	Place	Copa del Rey
2014–15	4	3ª	10th	
2015–16	4	3ª	15th	
2016–17	4	3ª	8th	
2017–18	4	3ª	14th	
2018–19	4	3ª	14th	
2019–20	4	3ª	12th	
2020–21	4	3ª	7th / 5th	
2021–22	6	Div. Hon.	2nd	
2022–23	6	Div. Hon.	2nd	
2023–24	6	Div. Hon.	1st	Preliminary
2024–25	5	3ª Fed.	15th	
2025–26	5	3ª Fed.	12th	
2026–27	5	3ª Fed.		

- 4 seasons in Segunda División B
- 35 seasons in Tercera División
- 3 seasons in Tercera Federación

== Famous players ==
- (Spain) José Luis González
- (Spain) Jorge Sánchez
- (Spain) Unai Expósito
