= AEC Manlleu =

Association football club in Spain

Manlleu
- Full name: Agrupació Esportiva i Cultural Manlleu
- Nicknames: Rojo y Amarillo (Red and yellows)
- Founded: 21 November 1931; 94 years ago
- Ground: Municipal de Manlleu, Manlleu, Spain
- Capacity: 4.000
- President: Albert Nebot Vilaseca
- Head coach: Miguel López
- League: Lliga Elit
- 2024–25: Lliga Elit, 9th of 16
Home colours	Away colours

Agrupació Esportiva i Cultural Manlleu is a football team based in Manlleu, Spain. Founded in 1931, it plays in the Lliga Elit. Its stadium is Municipal de Manlleu with a capacity of 3000 seats.

== Season to season ==
Season	Tier	Division	Place	Copa del Rey
1940–41	6	2ª Reg. P.	3rd	
1941–42	5	2ª Reg. P.	3rd	
1942–43	5	2ª Reg. P.	4th	
1943–44	7	3ª Reg.		
1944–45	DNP			
1945–46	7	3ª Reg.		
1946–47	7	4ª Reg.	4th	
1947–48	6	2ª Reg.	1st	
1948–49	6	2ª Reg.	5th	
1949–50	6	2ª Reg.	1st	
1950–51	5	1ª Reg. B	10th	
1951–52	5	1ª Reg. B	2nd	
1952–53	5	1ª Reg. B	1st	
1953–54	4	1ª Reg.	12th	
1954–55	4	1ª Reg.	2nd	
1955–56	4	1ª Reg.	4th	
1956–57	3	3ª	6th	
1957–58	3	3ª	4th	
1958–59	3	3ª	9th	
1959–60	3	3ª	9th	

Season	Tier	Division	Place	Copa del Rey
1960–61	3	3ª	10th	
1961–62	3	3ª	13th	
1962–63	4	1ª Reg.	4th	
1963–64	4	1ª Reg.	7th	
1964–65	DNP			
1965–66	5	2ª Reg.	6th	
1966–67	5	2ª Reg.	3rd	
1967–68	5	2ª Reg.	6th	
1968–69	5	1ª Reg.	15th	
1969–70	5	1ª Reg.	12th	
1970–71	5	1ª Reg.	10th	
1971–72	5	1ª Reg.	5th	
1972–73	5	1ª Reg.	9th	
1973–74	5	1ª Reg.	6th	
1974–75	5	1ª Reg.	6th	
1975–76	5	1ª Reg.	13th	
1976–77	5	1ª Reg.	12th	
1977–78	6	1ª Reg.	20th	
1978–79	7	2ª Reg.	12th	
1979–80	7	2ª Reg.	1st	

Season	Tier	Division	Place	Copa del Rey
1980–81	6	1ª Reg.	5th	
1981–82	6	1ª Reg.	1st	
1982–83	5	Reg. Pref.	15th	
1983–84	5	Reg. Pref.	1st	
1984–85	4	3ª	14th	
1985–86	4	3ª	4th	
1986–87	4	3ª	16th	First round
1987–88	4	3ª	4th	
1988–89	4	3ª	2nd	
1989–90	3	2ª B	6th	
1990–91	3	2ª B	3rd	Third round
1991–92	3	2ª B	2nd	Fourth round
1992–93	3	2ª B	13th	Third round
1993–94	3	2ª B	2nd	First round
1994–95	3	2ª B	5th	Second round
1995–96	3	2ª B	10th	First round
1996–97	3	2ª B	17th	
1997–98	4	3ª	5th	
1998–99	4	3ª	1st	
1999–2000	4	3ª	17th	

Season	Tier	Division	Place	Copa del Rey
2000–01	4	3ª	7th	
2001–02	4	3ª	14th	
2002–03	4	3ª	15th	
2003–04	4	3ª	19th	
2004–05	5	1ª Cat.	6th	
2005–06	5	1ª Cat.	5th	
2006–07	5	1ª Cat.	3rd	
2007–08	4	3ª	13th	
2008–09	4	3ª	5th	
2009–10	4	3ª	6th	
2010–11	4	3ª	6th	
2011–12	4	3ª	3rd	
2012–13	4	3ª	4th	
2013–14	4	3ª	10th	
2013–15	4	3ª	17th	
2015–16	4	3ª	15th	
2016–17	4	3ª	18th	
2017–18	5	1ª Cat.	7th	
2018–19	5	1ª Cat.	6th	
2019–20	5	1ª Cat.	4th	

Season	Tier	Division	Place	Copa del Rey
2020–21	5	1ª Cat.	6th	
2021–22	6	1ª Cat.	2nd	
2022–23	6	1ª Cat.	8th	
2023–24	7	1ª Cat.	1st	
2024–25	6	Lliga Elit	9th	
2025–26	6	Lliga Elit		

- 8 seasons in Segunda División B
- 26 seasons in Tercera División

== Current squad ==
Note: Flags indicate national team as defined under FIFA eligibility rules; some limited exceptions apply. Players may hold more than one non-FIFA nationality.

No.	Pos.	Nation	Player
—	GK	ESP	Daniel Barragán
—	GK	ESP	Francesc Sánchez
—	DF	ESP	Josep Archilla
—	DF	ESP	Juan José Sanmartín
—	DF	ESP	Manuel Moreno Yeste
—	DF	ESP	Ramón Masó
—	DF	ESP	Albert Masoliver
—	DF	ESP	Jordi Torner
—	DF	AND	Marc García

No.	Pos.	Nation	Player
—	MF	ESP	Óscar Gely
—	MF	ESP	Iván Fernández
—	MF	ESP	Joan Muntada
—	MF	ESP	Gerard Puigoriol
—	MF	ESP	Sergio Ginés
—	MF	ESP	Ricard Seuma
—	FW	ESP	Adrià Casanova
—	FW	ESP	Eduard Fortet
—	FW	ESP	Manel Sala

== Famous managers ==
- (Spain) Fabri
