= 1989–90 Segunda División B =

Season of third division football in Spain

Segunda División B
- Season: 1989–90
- Champions: Albacete; Avilés; Lleida; Orihuela
- Promoted: Albacete; Avilés; Lleida; Orihuela
- Relegated: Arosa; Atlético Baleares; Barbastro; Calahorra; Fraga; Gimnàstic; Ibiza; Jaén; Lalín; Laredo; Linares; Marbella; Maspalomas; Moscardó; Racing Ferrol; Salud; Utrera; Villarreal
- Matches: 1,520
- Goals: 3,512 (2.31 per match)
- Top goalscorer: Mariano Azcona; Pedro Corbalán (26 goals)
- Best goalkeeper: José Luis Montes (0.48 goals/match)
- Biggest home win: Albacete 11–1 Salud (30 December 1989)
- Biggest away win: Barbastro 0–6 Lleida (8 April 1990)
- Highest scoring: Albacete 11–1 Salud (30 December 1989)
- Longest winning run: 6 matches Osasuna Promesas; Sevilla Atlético; Barcelona Atlètic
- Longest unbeaten run: 19 matches Melilla
- Longest winless run: 26 matches Salud
- Longest losing run: 8 matches Salud

The 1989–90 Segunda División B season was the 13th since its establishment. The first matches of the season were played on 2 September 1989, and the season ended on 27 May 1990.

The division was divided into four geographic groups. The group champions were Real Avilés in Group 1, UE Lleida in Group 2, Albacete Balompié in Group 3, and Orihuela in Group 4.

== Overview before the season ==
80 teams joined the league, including four relegated from the 1988–89 Segunda División and 19 promoted from the 1988–89 Tercera División. The composition of the groups was determined by the Royal Spanish Football Federation, attending to geographical criteria.

Relegated from Segunda División

- Barcelona Atlètic
- Alzira
- Lleida
- Mollerussa

Promoted from Tercera División

- Cambados
- Sporting Atlético
- Laredo
- Santurtzi
- Girona
- Manlleu
- Benidorm
- Moscardó
- Numancia
- Estepona
- Utrera
- Mallorca Atlético
- Ibiza
- Salud
- Orihuela
- Mérida
- Mirandés
- Barbastro
- Toledo

== Group 1 ==
Teams from Asturias, Castile and Leon, Castilla–La Mancha, Galicia and Madrid.

=== Teams ===
Location of teams in Segunda División B Gr. 1 1989–90

Team	Founded	Home city	Stadium
Alcalá	1923	Alcalá de Henares, Madrid	El Val
Arosa	1945	Vilagarcía de Arousa, Galicia	A Lomba
As Pontes	1960	As Pontes, Galicia	O Poboado
Real Ávila	1923	Ávila, Castile and Leon	Adolfo Suárez
Real Avilés	1903	Avilés, Asturias	Román Suárez Puerta
Cambados	1963	Cambados, Galicia	Burgáns
Cultural Leonesa	1923	León, Castile and Leon	Antonio Amilvia
Getafe	1983	Getafe, Madrid	Las Margaritas
Lalín	1974	Lalín, Galicia	Manuel Anxo Cortizo
Langreo	1961	Langreo, Asturias	Ganzábal
Leganés	1928	Leganés, Madrid	Luis Rodríguez de Miguel
Lugo	1953	Lugo, Galicia	Anxo Carro
Moscardó	1945	Madrid, Madrid	Román Valero
Orense	1952	Ourense, Galicia	O Couto
Pegaso	1962	Tres Cantos, Madrid	La Foresta
Ponferradina	1922	Ponferrada, Castile and Leon	Fuentesnuevas
Pontevedra	1941	Pontevedra, Galicia	Pasarón
Racing de Ferrol	1919	Ferrol, Galicia	Manuel Rivera
Sporting Atlético	1960	Gijón, Asturias	Mareo
Toledo	1928	Toledo, Castilla–La Mancha	Salto del Caballo

=== League table ===
Pos	Team	Pld	W	D	L	GF	GA	GD	Pts	Qualification or relegation
1	Avilés	38	21	13	4	46	24	+22	55	Promotion to Segunda División
2	Getafe	38	18	15	5	54	30	+24	51	
3	Leganés	38	17	14	7	53	25	+28	48	
4	Cambados	38	17	11	10	41	28	+13	45	
5	Lugo	38	16	11	11	48	40	+8	43 (Note: Lugo finished ahead of Ponferradina on head-to-head points: Ponferradina–Lugo 0–0, Lugo–Ponferradina 1–0)	
6	Ponferradina	38	18	7	13	56	35	+21	43	
7	Cultural Leonesa	38	11	20	7	33	28	+5	42	
8	Ávila	38	12	17	9	52	46	+6	41	
9	Toledo	38	14	9	15	52	53	−1	37	
10	Pontevedra	38	11	14	13	38	45	−7	36	
11	Sporting Atlético	38	11	13	14	42	45	−3	35	
12	Langreo	38	12	10	16	39	52	−13	34 (Note: Langreo finished ahead of Ourense, As Pontes and Alcalá on head-to-head points: Langreo 7 pts, Ourense 6 pts, As Pontes 6 pts, Alcalá 5 pts. Ourense finished ahead of As Pontes on overall goal difference)	
13	Ourense	38	12	10	16	25	32	−7	34	
14	As Pontes	38	8	18	12	39	53	−14	34	
15	Alcalá	38	9	16	13	31	33	−2	34	
16	Pegaso	38	7	19	12	29	38	−9	33	
17	Racing Ferrol	38	7	18	13	35	47	−12	32 (Note: Racing Ferrol finished ahead of Moscardó on overall goal difference)	Relegation to Tercera División
18	Moscardó	38	8	16	14	27	41	−14	32	Relegation to Tercera División
19	Lalín	38	11	9	18	34	45	−11	31	Relegation to Tercera División
20	Arosa	38	4	12	22	31	65	−34	20	Relegation to Tercera División

Source: BDFútbol
Rules for classification: 1) points; 2) head-to-head points; 3) head-to-head goal difference; 4) goal difference; 5) number of goals scored

=== Results ===
Home \ Away	ALC	ARO	ASP	AVA	AVS	CAM	CUL	GET	LAL	LAN	LEG	LUG	MOS	ORE	PEG	PNF	PNT	RFE	SPO	TOL
Alcalá	—	1–0	6–0	0–0	0–0	1–0	1–1	0–0	0–0	0–1	0–0	2–0	1–1	1–0	1–0	0–0	1–2	1–1	1–1	3–2
Arosa	0–0	—	1–1	3–2	0–1	0–1	1–1	2–2	2–2	0–1	0–3	2–2	3–1	1–0	0–1	1–4	1–1	2–2	2–3	1–3
As Pontes	3–1	0–0	—	1–1	2–2	0–1	1–0	1–1	2–2	5–1	1–4	1–1	0–0	0–0	1–1	1–0	0–1	1–0	1–2	2–0
Real Ávila	2–1	2–0	1–1	—	3–2	1–1	1–1	2–1	2–0	2–1	1–1	4–0	1–1	0–0	2–2	2–0	3–0	1–1	1–1	2–2
Real Avilés Ind.	1–1	2–0	0–0	1–0	—	2–0	1–1	1–1	2–0	2–0	1–0	1–0	2–0	1–0	0–0	1–0	2–2	1–1	3–2	2–0
Cambados	1–0	2–0	1–1	0–0	2–0	—	2–1	1–2	1–1	5–1	0–0	1–0	0–0	3–0	1–0	3–2	1–0	2–1	0–1	2–0
Cultural Leonesa	0–0	0–0	1–0	0–2	2–0	1–0	—	1–2	1–0	2–2	0–0	1–1	3–0	1–0	0–0	2–0	0–0	2–1	1–1	0–0
Getafe	1–0	2–1	3–1	3–1	1–2	2–2	2–0	—	1–0	1–1	1–1	2–0	0–0	3–0	2–0	0–0	2–0	3–1	4–1	3–1
Lalín	2–1	2–0	1–1	2–1	1–0	0–1	0–1	1–0	—	4–0	0–1	1–0	0–0	1–0	1–0	1–1	0–0	2–0	1–2	2–1
Langreo	1–1	1–0	2–1	0–2	1–2	2–0	1–0	1–1	2–1	—	0–0	1–2	2–0	0–0	3–1	0–1	0–2	0–2	0–1	2–3
Leganés	2–1	3–0	0–1	1–1	0–1	2–0	0–0	0–0	2–0	3–2	—	4–2	2–0	2–0	0–0	4–1	1–2	7–0	1–0	3–2
Lugo	2–1	2–1	4–2	1–1	0–1	1–0	1–1	0–0	3–1	4–2	2–0	—	2–0	2–0	1–0	1–0	0–0	2–0	2–1	3–0
Moscardó	0–0	0–0	0–0	3–1	0–2	1–1	1–2	0–2	2–0	0–1	1–1	0–0	—	1–0	4–3	3–1	1–2	1–1	1–0	0–1
Orense	1–0	1–0	0–0	2–1	0–1	0–3	0–1	2–2	2–0	1–1	0–0	1–1	2–0	—	1–1	2–0	2–0	2–1	2–1	0–1
Pegaso	0–1	1–1	1–1	2–0	1–1	1–0	0–0	0–1	1–0	1–1	1–1	2–2	0–0	1–0	—	0–0	2–1	2–1	0–0	1–4
Ponferradina	3–0	4–0	6–1	5–0	0–1	0–0	2–0	3–0	4–1	1–0	3–1	0–0	2–0	1–0	2–0	—	1–2	0–0	2–1	4–2
Pontevedra	0–0	0–3	0–1	2–3	1–1	1–1	1–1	2–1	2–1	1–1	0–2	2–0	0–1	0–1	1–1	0–1	—	3–2	1–2	2–2
Racing Ferrol	2–1	3–0	2–2	1–1	0–0	2–0	1–1	0–0	1–1	0–0	0–0	0–2	0–0	0–2	1–0	4–2	1–1	—	0–0	1–0
Sporting Atlético	0–1	5–1	3–1	2–2	1–1	0–1	2–2	0–1	2–1	0–3	1–0	2–1	1–1	0–1	1–1	0–1	0–0	1–1	—	0–1
Toledo	3–1	3–2	3–1	1–0	1–2	1–1	1–1	1–1	3–1	0–1	0–1	2–1	2–3	0–0	1–1	3–1	0–1	1–0	1–1	—

Source: BDFútbol
Legend: Blue = home team win; Yellow = draw; Red = away team win.

=== Top goalscorers ===
Goalscorers	Goals	Team
(Spain) Antonio Rivera	20	Getafe
(Spain) Luis Soler	19	Leganés
(Spain) Diego Martín	17	Ávila
(Spain) Luisito	17	Moscardó
(Spain) José Antonio Velázquez	16	Avilés

=== Top goalkeepers ===
Goalkeeper	Goals	Matches	Average	Team
(Spain) Javier Aguilera	25	38	0.66	Leganés
(Spain) José Luis Manzanedo	27	38	0.71	Cultural Leonesa
(Spain) Millán	26	34	0.76	Cambados
(Spain) Pedro Caballero	30	38	0.79	Getafe
(Spain) Fermín Hortas	32	38	0.84	Ourense

== Group 2 ==
Teams from Andorra, Aragon, Basque Country, Cantabria, Catalonia, Castile and Leon, La Rioja and Navarre.

=== Teams ===
Location of teams in Segunda División B Gr. 2 1989–90

Team	Founded	Home city	Stadium
Andorra CF	1957	Andorra, Aragon	Juan Antonio Endeiza
FC Andorra	1942	Andorra la Vella, Andorra	Comunal
Barakaldo	1917	Barakaldo, Basque Country	Lasesarre
Barbastro	1934	Barbastro, Aragon	Municipal de Deportes
Basconia	1913	Basauri, Basque Country	Basozelai
Binéfar	1922	Binéfar, Aragon	El Segalar
Calahorra	1923	Calahorra, La Rioja	La Planilla
Deportivo Aragón	1958	Zaragoza, Aragon	Ciudad Deportiva del Real Zaragoza
Durango	1919	Durango, Basque Country	Tabira
Fraga	1947	Fraga, Aragon	La Estacada
Laredo	1918	Laredo, Cantabria	San Lorenzo
Lemona	1923	Lemoa, Basque Country	Arlonagusia
Lleida	1939	Lleida, Catalonia	Camp d'Esports
Mirandés	1927	Miranda de Ebro, Castile and Leon	Anduva
Mollerussa	1930	Mollerussa, Catalonia	Municipal Mollerussa
Numancia	1945	Soria, Castile and León	Los Pajaritos
Osasuna Promesas	1962	Aranguren, Navarre	Tajonar
San Sebastián	1951	San Sebastián, Basque Country	Atotxa
Santurtzi	1952	Santurtzi, Basque Country	San Jorge
Teruel	1954	Teruel, Aragon	Pinilla

=== League table ===
Pos	Team	Pld	W	D	L	GF	GA	GD	Pts	Qualification or relegation
1	Lleida	38	23	9	6	86	31	+55	55	Promotion to Segunda División
2	Osasuna Promesas	38	20	10	8	46	29	+17	50	
3	Mollerussa	38	22	5	11	61	29	+32	49	
4	FC Andorra	38	18	10	10	57	43	+14	46	
5	San Sebastián	38	15	14	9	51	37	+14	44	
6	Cultural Durango	38	15	13	10	40	39	+1	43 (Note: Durango finished ahead of Lemona and Deportivo Aragón on head-to-head points: Durango 7 pts, Lemona 3 pts, Deportivo Aragón 2 pts)	
7	Lemona	38	10	23	5	36	28	+8	43	
8	Deportivo Aragón	38	14	15	9	54	41	+13	43	
9	Binéfar	38	12	12	14	41	44	−3	36	
10	Barakaldo	38	11	13	14	47	41	+6	35 (Note: Barakaldo finished ahead of Andorra, Santurtzi, Numancia and Mirandés on head-to-head points: Barakaldo 10 pts, Andorra 10 pts, Santurtzi 9 pts, Numancia 7 pts, Mirandés 4 pts. Barakaldo finished ahead of Andorra on head-to-head goal difference: Andorra–Barakaldo 3–0, Barakaldo–Andorra 4–0)	
11	Andorra	38	13	9	16	45	46	−1	35	
12	Santurtzi	38	14	7	17	49	56	−7	35	
13	Numancia	38	12	11	15	37	45	−8	35	
14	Mirandés	38	11	13	14	45	52	−7	35	
15	Baskonia	38	11	11	16	31	48	−17	33 (Note: Baskonia finished ahead of Teruel and Laredo on head-to-head points: Baskonia 5 pts, Teruel 4 pts, Laredo 3 pts)	
16	Teruel	38	11	11	16	46	54	−8	33	
17	Laredo	38	13	7	18	42	67	−25	33	Relegation to Tercera División
18	Fraga	38	10	10	18	41	61	−20	30	Relegation to Tercera División
19	Calahorra	38	10	5	23	37	69	−32	25	Relegation to Tercera División
20	Barbastro	38	5	12	21	32	64	−32	22	Relegation to Tercera División

Source: BDFútbol
Rules for classification: 1) points; 2) head-to-head points; 3) head-to-head goal difference; 4) goal difference; 5) number of goals scored

=== Results ===
Home \ Away	AND	FCA	BAR	BAB	BAS	BIN	CAL	DAR	DUR	FRA	LAR	LEM	LLE	MIR	MOL	NUM	OSA	SSE	SAN	TER
Andorra CF	—	0–1	3–0	3–0	3–1	1–1	4–0	1–0	0–1	3–4	3–1	1–1	2–1	2–1	1–3	1–1	1–1	1–1	1–0	2–1
FC Andorra	2–1	—	2–1	5–5	2–0	3–0	2–0	1–0	1–0	1–0	2–1	1–0	1–0	1–1	0–4	1–2	2–0	0–0	0–1	5–2
Barakaldo	4–0	0–0	—	1–1	0–0	0–1	4–1	1–1	2–2	2–2	4–1	2–2	0–1	1–0	2–2	2–0	1–1	1–2	3–1	6–1
Barbastro	1–1	1–3	0–2	—	3–1	1–1	0–1	1–3	1–0	1–0	0–1	1–1	0–6	1–1	0–2	0–1	2–1	0–3	1–0	0–0
Basconia	1–0	1–1	0–1	2–1	—	1–2	3–2	1–1	0–1	0–1	1–0	0–0	0–4	0–0	0–2	3–0	2–0	2–1	2–1	1–0
Binéfar	1–0	2–2	1–2	2–1	0–1	—	3–0	2–2	4–0	2–1	0–0	1–1	0–2	3–2	0–2	0–0	0–1	0–1	1–0	2–0
Calahorra	1–4	0–3	1–0	1–0	1–1	2–3	—	1–3	2–3	1–2	4–1	0–3	0–1	2–2	0–2	3–0	0–0	2–1	2–1	2–0
Deportivo Aragón	3–0	3–2	2–0	0–0	4–0	1–1	3–0	—	0–1	3–2	1–2	2–2	1–1	1–1	0–3	1–1	3–1	1–0	1–1	0–2
Durango	1–1	0–0	1–2	0–0	1–2	2–1	4–0	2–1	—	2–0	3–2	1–0	2–1	0–2	3–1	1–0	0–1	1–0	3–3	2–2
Fraga	1–0	1–2	1–0	1–1	0–0	1–1	1–1	1–1	1–1	—	3–0	0–2	1–6	0–1	2–0	0–1	0–0	2–2	1–3	2–3
Laredo	1–0	1–2	0–0	2–2	3–0	2–1	1–0	1–2	1–0	0–3	—	1–1	0–1	4–2	3–2	2–1	1–0	1–1	2–1	0–0
Lemona	0–0	1–1	2–0	3–2	2–2	1–0	0–0	0–0	0–0	2–3	0–0	—	1–1	0–0	1–0	2–1	1–0	1–1	0–0	2–0
Lleida	3–0	1–1	1–0	3–2	3–1	0–0	3–1	1–1	5–1	6–0	6–0	2–0	—	6–1	1–0	1–3	1–1	1–1	3–0	4–2
Mirandés	1–1	1–1	0–0	4–1	2–1	0–2	3–1	0–0	0–0	2–0	4–1	0–0	0–3	—	1–1	4–0	2–1	0–2	0–2	2–1
Mollerussa	0–1	2–1	1–0	2–0	2–0	2–0	1–0	1–3	0–0	4–0	4–0	2–0	2–0	1–0	—	2–1	0–1	0–2	5–0	1–1
Numancia	1–2	3–2	1–0	1–0	2–0	2–0	1–2	3–1	0–0	2–0	0–2	0–0	0–0	3–0	0–0	—	1–2	1–1	1–1	0–0
Osasuna Prom.	2–0	2–1	4–2	2–0	0–0	1–0	3–1	0–1	0–0	1–0	2–0	1–1	1–1	4–1	1–0	2–1	—	1–0	1–0	1–0
San Sebastián	1–0	2–1	1–1	1–0	1–1	2–2	1–0	1–0	3–0	2–2	5–3	1–1	2–1	0–1	1–2	1–0	1–1	—	4–1	2–2
Santurtzi	1–0	2–0	0–0	1–0	1–0	3–0	1–0	1–2	0–0	2–1	5–1	0–1	3–4	3–2	1–2	2–2	2–4	1–0	—	3–2
Teruel	2–1	2–1	1–0	2–2	0–0	1–1	1–2	2–2	0–1	0–1	1–0	1–1	0–1	2–1	2–1	4–0	0–1	2–0	4–1	—

Source: BDFútbol
Legend: Blue = home team win; Yellow = draw; Red = away team win.

=== Top goalscorers ===
Goalscorers	Goals	Team
(Spain) Mariano Azcona	26	Lleida
(Spain) Francisco Aleñá	15	Lleida
(Spain) Antonio Rueda	15	FC Andorra
(Spain) Iñigo Gamboa	15	Santurtzi
(Spain) Juan Carlos Lasheras	14	Barakaldo

=== Top goalkeepers ===
Goalkeeper	Goals	Matches	Average	Team
(Spain) Iñaki Saiz	23	33	0.7	Lemona
(Spain) Toño Alfageme	34	33	1.03	Numancia
(Spain) Mario García	38	36	1.06	Deportivo Aragón
(Spain) Iñaki Azkune	33	31	1.06	Durango
(Spain) Juan Tapia	40	37	1.08	FC Andorra

== Group 3 ==
Teams from Andalusia, Canary Islands, Castilla–La Mancha, Ceuta, Extremadura and Melilla.

=== Teams ===
Location of teams in Segunda División B Gr. 3 1989–90
Canary Islands

Team	Founded	Home city	Stadium
Albacete	1940	Albacete, Castilla–La Mancha	Carlos Belmonte
Badajoz	1905	Badajoz, Extremadura	Vivero
Ceuta	1970	Ceuta	Alfonso Murube
Córdoba	1954	Córdoba, Andalusia	El Arcángel
Estepona	1947	Estepona, Andalusia	Francisco Muñoz Pérez
Granada	1931	Granada, Andalusia	Los Cármenes
Real Jaén	1929	Jaén, Andalusia	La Victoria
Linares	1961	Linares, Andalusia	Linarejos
Linense	1912	La Línea de la Concepción, Andalusia	Municipal La Línea de la Concepción
Marbella	1947	Marbella, Andalusia	Municipal de Marbella
Marino	1936	Playa de las Américas, Canary Islands	Antonio Domínguez Alfonso
Maspalomas	1969	San Bartolomé de Tirajana, Canary Islands	Ciudad Deportiva Maspalomas
Melilla	1976	Melilla	Álvarez Claro
Mérida	1912	Mérida, Extremadura	Romano
Salud	1961	Santa Cruz de Tenerife, Canary Islands	La Salud
Atlético Sanluqueño	1948	Sanlúcar de Barrameda, Andalusia	El Palmar
Sevilla Atlético	1950	Seville, Andalusia	Viejo Nervión
Telde	1965	Telde, Canary Islands	El Hornillo
Tomelloso	1979	Tomelloso, Castilla–La Mancha	Municipal
Utrera	1946	Utrera, Andalusia	San Juan Bosco

=== League table ===
Pos	Team	Pld	W	D	L	GF	GA	GD	Pts	Qualification or relegation
1	Albacete	38	27	6	5	88	29	+59	60	Promotion to Segunda División
2	Melilla	38	22	11	5	48	19	+29	55	
3	Sevilla Atlético	38	20	9	9	53	31	+22	49	
4	Ceuta	38	18	10	10	56	41	+15	46 (Note: Ceuta finished ahead of Granada on head-to-head goal difference: Ceuta–Granada 3–3, Granada–Ceuta 1–2)	
5	Granada	38	17	12	9	58	36	+22	46	
6	Badajoz	38	16	13	9	34	23	+11	45	
7	Linares (Note: Linares was relegated to Tercera División due to financial problems)	38	16	12	10	57	34	+23	44	Relegation to Tercera División
8	Mérida	38	14	12	12	43	40	+3	40	
9	Atlético Sanluqueño	38	14	10	14	32	44	−12	38 (Note: Atlético Sanluqueño finished ahead of Marino, Tomelloso and Córdoba on head-to-head points: Atlético Sanluqueño 7 pts, Marino 7 pts, Tomelloso 5 pts, Córdoba 5 pts. Atlético Sanluqueño finished ahead of Marino on head-to-head points: Marino–Atlético Sanluqueño 0–1, Atlético Sanluqueño–Marino 1–0. Tomelloso finished ahead of Córdoba on overall goal difference)	
10	Marino	38	15	8	15	43	49	−6	38	
11	Tomelloso	38	12	14	12	49	41	+8	38	
12	Córdoba	38	11	16	11	38	39	−1	38	
13	Telde	38	11	12	15	31	50	−19	34	
14	Linense	38	10	12	16	38	43	−5	32	
15	Estepona	38	10	11	17	34	51	−17	31 (Note: Estepona finished ahead of Jaén and Marbella on head-to-head points: Estepona 5 pts, Jaén 4 pts, Marbella 3 pts)	
16	Jaén	38	10	11	17	42	47	−5	31	Relegation to Tercera División
17	Marbella	38	8	15	15	30	38	−8	31	Relegation to Tercera División
18	Utrera	38	7	16	15	24	35	−11	30	Relegation to Tercera División
19	Maspalomas	38	7	9	22	38	63	−25	23	Relegation to Tercera División
20	Salud	38	3	5	30	21	104	−83	11	Relegation to Tercera División

Source: BDFútbol
Rules for classification: 1) points; 2) head-to-head points; 3) head-to-head goal difference; 4) goal difference; 5) number of goals scored

=== Results ===
Home \ Away	ALB	BAD	CEU	COR	EST	GRA	JAE	LIN	LNS	MAB	MAR	MAS	MEL	MER	SAL	SLU	SAT	TEL	TOM	UTR
Albacete	—	3–0	3–3	3–0	1–0	2–1	2–0	4–0	3–0	0–0	5–2	4–1	0–1	4–0	11–1	4–0	2–0	2–0	1–0	2–0
Badajoz	2–1	—	1–0	0–0	1–1	1–0	0–1	0–0	0–0	0–0	3–0	2–0	0–0	2–0	5–0	0–0	2–1	1–0	0–0	1–0
Ceuta	0–2	2–0	—	1–1	3–0	3–3	3–0	2–0	0–0	1–0	4–1	3–2	1–0	3–1	3–0	1–1	1–1	3–0	1–0	0–0
Córdoba	0–1	0–0	0–0	—	1–1	2–1	1–0	1–0	0–0	1–0	0–0	2–0	0–0	1–1	2–1	1–2	2–3	1–1	1–1	1–1
Estepona	1–1	0–0	1–1	2–1	—	2–2	4–1	3–0	1–0	3–2	0–1	0–0	1–2	1–0	3–1	3–0	0–1	1–0	0–1	1–0
Granada	1–0	2–0	1–2	3–1	3–0	—	1–1	1–0	4–0	3–0	1–0	1–1	1–0	2–0	3–1	2–0	0–0	3–0	0–0	3–1
Jaén	0–0	0–0	1–2	1–2	1–0	3–1	—	0–0	0–0	3–2	2–0	3–0	1–2	1–2	6–0	0–1	0–2	5–1	3–1	0–0
Linares	2–2	1–1	5–0	3–2	2–0	2–2	3–0	—	2–0	0–0	3–0	3–0	4–0	0–0	5–0	1–0	2–3	4–1	1–0	0–0
Linense	2–3	2–0	0–2	2–2	5–0	2–1	1–0	1–2	—	0–0	1–1	3–1	1–0	0–1	4–0	1–1	3–0	0–0	3–3	3–0
Marbella	2–4	0–1	0–0	1–1	0–0	2–0	3–0	0–3	0–0	—	1–0	2–1	0–0	1–1	3–1	0–1	0–1	0–0	1–1	1–2
Marino	0–4	3–4	2–1	2–1	1–1	2–2	4–0	3–0	3–0	1–1	—	1–0	1–1	2–1	1–0	0–1	1–1	1–0	2–0	2–0
Maspalomas	1–5	1–3	3–1	0–2	4–0	1–3	0–0	1–4	0–0	3–2	0–1	—	0–1	1–2	1–0	4–0	1–0	0–1	2–2	0–0
Melilla	2–0	0–0	2–0	1–0	1–0	2–0	2–0	2–2	2–0	2–1	4–0	1–0	—	1–0	4–1	4–1	0–1	0–0	3–1	1–1
Mérida	0–1	1–0	1–0	1–2	5–1	2–0	2–1	1–1	2–0	0–0	1–0	1–1	0–2	—	6–0	2–1	1–3	1–1	2–2	2–0
Salud	3–0	0–1	0–3	0–3	0–0	0–4	2–2	1–0	1–0	0–0	0–3	0–3	0–1	1–1	—	1–1	0–3	1–2	1–2	0–2
Atlético Sanluqueño	1–1	1–0	2–1	0–1	3–1	2–2	0–0	0–1	0–1	2–1	1–0	1–0	0–2	0–0	1–0	—	1–0	3–0	1–1	1–0
Sevilla Atlético	2–3	2–0	4–1	3–0	1–0	0–1	2–1	0–0	1–0	2–0	3–0	2–2	0–0	0–0	3–1	3–0	—	1–0	0–1	1–1
Telde	0–1	1–0	1–2	2–1	2–2	0–0	0–0	1–0	4–3	0–2	1–0	2–1	0–0	3–1	3–1	3–1	0–0	—	0–0	0–3
Tomelloso	0–1	0–1	2–1	1–1	2–0	0–0	1–5	0–0	2–0	0–1	1–2	4–1	1–2	3–0	6–1	2–1	3–1	4–0	—	1–1
Utrera	1–2	0–2	0–1	0–0	1–0	1–2	0–0	2–1	1–0	0–1	0–0	1–1	0–0	0–1	3–1	0–0	1–2	1–1	0–0	—

Source: BDFútbol
Legend: Blue = home team win; Yellow = draw; Red = away team win.

=== Top goalscorers ===
Goalscorers	Goals	Team
(Spain) Pedro Corbalán	26	Albacete
(Spain) Antonio López	18	Albacete
(Spain) Jorge Antelo	17	Ceuta
(Spain) Paco Luna	16	Melilla
(Spain) Totó	16	Melilla

=== Top goalkeepers ===
Goalkeeper	Goals	Matches	Average	Team
(Spain) José Luis Montes	17	35	0.49	Melilla
(Spain) Monchi	30	37	0.81	Sevilla Atlético
(Spain) Valle	25	30	0.83	Utrera
(Spain) Francisco Leal	26	29	0.9	Marbella
(Spain) Peio Aguirreoa	30	33	0.91	Linares

== Group 4 ==
Teams from Balearic Islands, Catalonia, Region of Murcia and Valencian Community.

=== Teams ===
Location of teams in Segunda División B Gr. 4 1989–90

Team	Founded	Home city	Stadium
Alcoyano	1928	Alcoy, Valencian Community	El Collao
Alzira	1946	Alzira, Valencian Community	Luis Suñer Picó
Atlético Baleares	1942	Palma de Mallorca, Balearic Islands	Balear
Barcelona Atlètic	1970	Barcelona, Catalonia	Mini Estadi
Benidorm	1964	Benidorm, Valencian Community	Foietes
Cartagena FC	1940	Cartagena, Region of Murcia	Cartagonova
Eldense	1921	Elda, Valencian Community	Pepico Amat
Gandía	1947	Gandia, Valencian Community	Guillermo Olagüe
Gimnàstic de Tarragona	1886	Tarragona, Catalonia	Nou Estadi
Girona	1930	Girona, Catalonia	Montilivi
Hércules	1922	Alicante, Valencian Community	José Rico Pérez
Hospitalet	1957	L'Hospitalet de Llobregat, Catalonia	Municipal de Deportes
Ibiza	1956	Ibiza, Balearic Islands	Can Misses
Sporting Mahonés	1974	Mahón, Balearic Islands	Bintaufa
Mallorca Atlético	1967	Palma de Mallorca, Balearic Islands	Lluís Sitjar
Manlleu	1933	Manlleu, Catalonia	Municipal Manlleu
Olímpic de Xàtiva	1932	Xàtiva, Valencian Community	La Murta
Orihuela	1944	Orihuela, Valencian Community	Los Arcos
Torrevieja	1971	Torrevieja, Valencian Community	Vicente García
Villarreal	1923	Villarreal, Valencian Community	El Madrigal

=== League table ===
Pos	Team	Pld	W	D	L	GF	GA	GD	Pts	Qualification or relegation
1	Orihuela	38	21	9	8	55	32	+23	51 (Note: Orihuela finished ahead of Barcelona Atlètic on head-to-head goal difference: Barcelona Atlètic–Orihuela 2–1, Orihuela–Barcelona Atlètic 2–0)	Promotion to Segunda División
2	Barcelona Atlètic	38	22	7	9	68	36	+32	51	
3	Gandía	38	19	11	8	59	29	+30	49	
4	Alcoyano	38	14	16	8	55	47	+8	44	
5	Benidorm	38	15	13	10	46	30	+16	43	
6	Manlleu	38	16	9	13	51	51	0	41 (Note: Manlleu finished ahead of Alzira on head-to-head points: Alzira–Manlleu 1–1, Manlleu–Alzira 1–0)	
7	Alzira	38	15	11	12	42	33	+9	41	
8	Sporting Mahonés	38	15	10	13	58	51	+7	40	
9	L'Hospitalet	38	14	11	13	46	48	−2	39	
10	Olímpic	38	14	10	14	49	49	0	38	
11	Cartagena	38	13	11	14	40	39	+1	37 (Note: Cartagena finished ahead of Girona on head-to-head goal difference: Cartagena–Girona 3–0, Girona–Cartagena 1–0)	
12	Girona	38	14	9	15	51	62	−11	37	
13	Hércules	38	10	16	12	48	40	+8	36	
14	Mallorca Atlético	38	10	15	13	39	43	−4	35 (Note: Mallorca Atlético finished ahead of Torrevieja on head-to-head points: Torrevieja–Mallorca Atlético 0–1, Mallorca Atlético–Torrevieja 1–1)	
15	Torrevieja	38	12	11	15	37	52	−15	35	
16	Eldense	38	13	8	17	47	51	−4	34	
17	Gimnàstic	38	9	13	16	31	39	−8	31	Relegation to Tercera División
18	Villarreal	38	9	12	17	33	52	−19	30	Relegation to Tercera División
19	Ibiza	38	11	7	20	38	68	−30	29	Relegation to Tercera División
20	Atlético Baleares	38	5	9	24	33	74	−41	19	Relegation to Tercera División

Source: BDFútbol
Rules for classification: 1) points; 2) head-to-head points; 3) head-to-head goal difference; 4) goal difference; 5) number of goals scored

=== Results ===
Home \ Away	ALC	ALZ	BAL	BAR	BEN	CAR	ELD	GAN	GIM	GIR	HER	HOS	IBI	MAH	MAL	MAN	OLI	ORI	TRV	VIL
Alcoyano	—	2–2	6–1	2–1	0–0	2–0	1–0	2–1	2–1	3–1	0–3	4–4	1–1	1–1	2–1	3–2	2–1	2–1	1–0	1–1
Alzira	0–2	—	1–0	1–0	0–2	0–1	1–0	3–2	1–0	0–0	0–0	0–0	5–1	1–0	2–0	1–1	1–2	2–1	3–0	2–0
Atlético Baleares	1–2	0–0	—	3–1	0–2	1–2	2–2	0–4	0–1	0–1	1–1	0–0	1–0	1–2	0–0	1–0	0–0	0–4	1–2	3–0
Barcelona Atlètic	0–0	2–1	5–2	—	2–1	0–1	3–0	4–2	2–1	1–0	1–1	3–1	3–0	2–1	0–0	4–0	2–1	2–1	5–0	5–1
Benidorm	0–0	2–1	2–0	1–0	—	1–0	3–2	1–1	1–1	0–1	1–1	2–1	3–0	0–1	4–0	0–1	3–0	0–0	1–1	1–1
Cartagena FC	1–1	1–1	3–1	1–2	1–1	—	0–1	1–1	4–1	3–0	1–0	0–2	3–1	2–0	0–3	0–1	0–0	1–1	0–0	5–0
Eldense	2–2	1–0	4–1	2–1	0–2	1–2	—	0–3	0–0	4–0	1–2	3–0	4–1	1–1	2–1	0–1	2–0	2–2	1–2	2–2
Gandía	2–0	0–1	1–1	1–1	1–0	2–0	1–0	—	0–0	3–0	2–1	5–0	2–1	3–1	0–0	3–1	1–1	0–1	3–0	2–1
Gimnàstic	3–1	1–0	0–0	1–3	0–1	2–2	1–2	0–2	—	1–1	0–0	0–1	2–1	1–1	0–1	1–0	0–0	0–0	3–0	0–1
Girona	2–2	1–2	4–1	2–1	1–5	1–0	2–1	1–1	1–1	—	1–1	2–0	3–2	3–2	2–0	3–5	2–2	0–2	7–0	0–2
Hércules	2–2	3–3	1–3	1–1	0–0	1–0	3–0	0–2	2–0	0–0	—	0–1	6–0	3–1	2–0	3–0	2–3	0–1	1–1	2–0
Hospitalet	1–0	1–0	2–1	1–2	1–1	2–0	0–0	1–0	2–2	2–0	1–1	—	2–0	1–3	2–2	2–2	1–3	5–1	0–2	1–0
Ibiza	1–1	0–2	2–0	1–2	1–0	1–0	1–3	0–2	2–0	1–1	2–1	1–0	—	2–0	1–0	4–1	0–4	0–3	2–0	0–0
Sporting Mahonés	1–0	1–1	3–1	0–2	2–1	2–1	0–1	1–1	0–3	5–2	3–1	1–2	2–2	—	2–1	1–1	2–0	0–1	3–0	3–0
Mallorca Atlético	1–1	1–1	2–2	1–1	1–2	1–2	4–1	1–0	1–0	2–0	0–0	2–2	2–0	0–0	—	1–2	3–0	1–1	1–1	1–0
Manlleu	1–0	1–0	3–1	1–3	1–1	0–0	3–1	1–1	1–0	0–1	2–0	1–0	3–1	3–3	1–1	—	3–1	2–0	0–1	1–2
Olímpic Xàtiva	4–2	1–0	1–0	1–0	4–1	0–1	2–0	0–0	1–2	1–2	3–1	0–2	2–2	0–4	4–1	1–1	—	1–0	1–1	1–1
Orihuela	1–1	2–0	4–1	2–0	2–0	0–0	1–0	2–0	2–1	2–0	2–1	2–1	0–0	3–1	2–0	0–2	2–1	—	3–2	1–0
Torrevieja	1–1	0–2	3–1	0–0	0–0	4–0	0–0	1–3	0–0	3–1	0–0	1–0	3–1	1–2	0–1	4–2	0–1	1–0	—	2–0
Villarreal	1–0	1–1	3–1	0–1	1–0	1–1	0–1	0–1	0–1	1–2	1–1	1–1	1–2	2–2	1–1	2–0	2–1	2–2	1–0	—

Source: BDFútbol
Legend: Blue = home team win; Yellow = draw; Red = away team win.

=== Top goalscorers ===
Goalscorers	Goals	Team
(Spain) Francisco Sigüenza	21	Orihuela
(Spain) Mariano Ayneto	19	Gandía
(Spain) Antonio Pinilla	14	Barcelona Atlètic
(Spain) Antonio Barnils	14	Manlleu
(Spain) César Ferrando	14	Olímpic

=== Top goalkeepers ===
Goalkeeper	Goals	Matches	Average	Team
(Spain) Ignacio Verdés	22	30	0.73	Alzira
(Spain) Juan Espín	29	38	0.76	Gandía
(Spain) Juan Miguel San Román	28	36	0.78	Benidorm
(Spain) Carles Busquets	28	30	0.93	Barcelona Atlètic
(Spain) Agapito Moncaleán	37	36	1.03	Gimnàstic
