= Juventud Cambados =

Association football club in Spain

- Full name: Club Juventud Cambados
- Nickname: Camba
- Founded: 1963; 63 years ago
- Stadium: Campo Municipal de Burgáns
- Capacity: 2,000
- President: Eladio Oubiña Diz
- Head coach: Gabriel Saraiva
- League: Preferente Futgal – Group 2
- 2025–26: Tercera Federación – Group 1, 16th of 18 (relegated)
Home colours	Away colours

Club Juventud Cambados (Galician: Club Xuventude Cambados) is a Spanish amateur football club based in Cambados, Galicia. The club currently competes in Preferente Futgal – Group 2, the sixth tier of Spanish football.

In addition to its senior team, Cambados also has a large youth section, a reserve side known as Beiramar CF, and a women's team.

== History ==
Founded in 1963, the club succeeded two earlier Cambados-based teams, Juventud Católica and Club Deportivo Cambados (1950–1961), which had dissolved two years prior. All three clubs played at the A Merced football ground, owned by the Catholic youth association, Juventud Católica, which was instrumental in popularising football in the town.

The team experienced a brief period of notable success between 1989 and 1992, largely attributed to financial support from local drug trafficker, Sito Miñanco. During this time, Cambados reached as high as 4th in Spain's third division. However, following Miñanco's arrest and the subsequent loss of funding, the club was forced to part ways with many of its star players, leading to a decline in performance on the pitch.

== Seasons ==
Season	Tier	Division	Place	Copa del Rey
1965–66	5	1ª Reg.	3rd	
1966–67	5	1ª Reg.	6th	
1967–68	5	1ª Reg.	3rd	
1968–69	5	1ª Reg.	1st	
1969–70	5	1ª Reg.	4th	
1970–71	5	1ª Reg.	1st	
1971–72	4	Serie A	7th	
1972–73	4	Serie A	9th	
1973–74	4	Serie A	6th	
1974–75	4	Serie A	3rd	
1975–76	4	Serie A	4th	
1976–77	4	Serie A	4th	
1977–78	4	3ª	12th	
1978–79	4	3ª	4th	
1979–80	4	3ª	6th	Second round
1980–81	4	3ª	7th	First round
1981–82	4	3ª	18th	
1982–83	5	Reg. Pref.	10th	
1983–84	5	Reg. Pref.	14th	
1984–85	5	Reg. Pref.	3rd	

Season	Tier	Division	Place	Copa del Rey
1985–86	5	Reg. Pref.	12th	
1986–87	5	Reg. Pref.	2nd	
1987–88	4	3ª	2nd	
1988–89	4	3ª	1st	
1989–90	3	2ª B	4th	
1990–91	3	2ª B	16th	First round
1991–92	3	2ª B	19th	Second round
1992–93	4	3ª	6th	First round
1993–94	4	3ª	20th	First round
1994–95	5	Reg. Pref.	4th	
1995–96	5	Reg. Pref.	1st	
1996–97	4	3ª	16th	
1997–98	4	3ª	21st	
1998–99	5	Reg. Pref.	17th	
1999–2000	6	1ª Reg.	4th	
2000–01	6	1ª Reg.	9th	
2001–02	6	1ª Reg.	2nd	
2002–03	5	Reg. Pref.	9th	
2003–04	5	Reg. Pref.	15th	
2004–05	5	Reg. Pref.	12th	

Season	Tier	Division	Place	Copa del Rey
2005–06	5	Reg. Pref.	19th	
2006–07	6	1ª Aut.	5th	
2007–08	6	1ª Aut.	5th	
2008–09	6	1ª Aut.	1st	
2009–10	5	Pref. Aut.	14th	
2010–11	5	Pref. Aut.	18th	
2011–12	6	1ª Aut.	11th	
2012–13	6	1ª Aut.	15th	
2013–14	6	1ª Aut.	10th	
2014–15	6	1ª Aut.	15th	
2015–16	7	2ª Aut.	1st	
2016–17	6	1ª Gal.	7th	
2017–18	6	1ª Gal.	2nd	
2018–19	5	Pref.	5th	
2019–20	5	Pref.	15th	
2020–21	5	Pref.	4th	
2021–22	6	Pref.	8th	
2022–23	6	Pref.	12th	
2023–24	6	Pref.	7th	
2024–25	6	Pref. Futgal	5th	

Season	Tier	Division	Place	Copa del Rey
2025–26	5	3ª Fed.		

- 3 seasons in Segunda División B
- 11 seasons in Tercera División
- 1 season in Tercera Federación

== Notable players ==
- (Spain) Dani Abalo

== Bibliography ==
- De Luis Manero, Felipe (2020). Sito presidente. Vidas (in Spanish) (1st ed.). Logroño, Spain: Pepitas de Calabaza. ISBN 978-84-17386-59-7.
- Lagunas, Aitor (2025-04-25). "Cambados: fútbol, narcos y nécoras". Brazalete Negro (Podcast) (in Spanish). Radio Primavera Sound / Panenka Podcast.
