= 1992–93 Copa del Rey =

91st Copa del Rey

Tournament details
- Country: Spain
- Teams: 205

Final positions
- Champions: Real Madrid
- Runner-up: Real Zaragoza

Tournament statistics
- Matches played: 161
- Goals scored: 438 (2.72 per match)
- Top goal scorer(s): Jan Urban (8 goals)

The 1992–93 Copa del Rey was the 91st staging of the Copa del Rey.

The competition started on 28 August 1992 and concluded on 26 June 1993 with the Final, held at the Estadio Luis Casanova in Valencia.

== First round ==
Team 1	Agg.	Team 2	1st leg	2nd leg
CD Alfaro	2–4	CD Tudelano	2–2	0–2
CD Peña Sport	2–5	CD Calahorra	0–1	2–4
SD Almazán	3–2	Real Ávila CF	2–1	1–1
SD Ejea	0–1	Utebo CF	0–0	0–1
Atlético Saguntino	3–7	Levante UD	2–2	1–5
SD Sueca	4–7	UD Horadada	3–2	1–5
Ontinyent CF	2–6	Hércules CF	1–2	1–4
Juventud Cambados	1–2	CD Ourense	0–0	1–2
Real Titánico	0–6	Real Avilés Industrial	0–4	0–2
Marino de Luanco	4–5	CD Lealtad	0–3	4–2
CD Colonia Moscardó	0–3	Getafe CF	0–0	0–3
CD Arguineguín	1–10	UD Las Palmas	0–3	1–7
CA Artajonés	1–2	CD Mirandés	1–0	0–2
CD Carballiño	3–0	CD Lalín	1–0	2–0
UM Escobedo	1–4	Gimnástica de Torrelavega	0–0	1–4
CD Pontejos	4–2	Marina de Cudeyo CF	1–2	3–0
CD Laredo	4–2	CD Comillas	3–1	1–1
Atlético Malagueño	3–4	UD Melilla	2–1	1–3
SD Amorebieta	3–0	CD Santurtzi	2–0	1–0
CD Santuchu	0–7	Barakaldo CF	0–3	0–4
Zalla UC	0–2	SD Lemona	0–0	0–2
Tolosa CF	0–8	CD Baskonia	0–1	0–7
Real Unión Club	4–0	SD Beasain	2–0	2–0
CD Mosconia	2–3	Caudal Deportivo	2–1	0–2
UP Langreo	2–3	Club Hispano de Castrillón	1–1	1–2
SD Huesca	5–3	UD Fraga	2–2	3–1
Cultural de León	1–8	UD Salamanca	0–3	1–5
CD Barco	2–5	SD Burela	0–3	2–2
CD Estradense	0–3	Endesa As Pontes	0–1	0–2
Bergantiños FC	1–2	Pontevedra CF	0–1	1–1
CD Mármol Macael	1–4	Granada CF	1–1	0–3
CD Guadalajara	0–2	CD Valdepeñas	0–0	0–2
UD Oliva	1–3	Elche CF	1–0	0–3
CF Gandía	3–5	Lliria CF	0–2	3–3
CF Gimnástico de Alcázar	4–1	CD Toledo	1–0	3–1
CP Villarrobledo	0–3	Atlético Tomelloso	0–1	0–2
Talavera CF	1–4	UB Conquense	0–1	1–3
CD Cieza	0–16	Real Murcia	0–2	0–14
CD Beniel	1–3	Cartagena FC	1–2	0–1
Santomera CF	1–4	Yeclano CF	0–2	1–2
Caravaca CF	6–4	CF Lorca Deportiva	3–1	3–3
Águilas CF	4–4	CD Roldán	2–0	2–4
UD Montijo	3–5	Moralo CP	1–3	2–2
CD Pozoblanco	4–2	CD San Roque de Lepe	2–0	2–2
Cristian Lay CF	3–2	UP Plasencia	1–1	2–1
CP Cacereño	2–5	CF Extremadura	0–0	2–5
CF Villanovense	0–5	CD Don Benito	0–4	0–1
Almería CF	2–3	Real Jaén	1–2	1–1
UD Orotava	1–1	CD Mensajero	1–0	0–1
UD Telde	3–4	CD Maspalomas	3–2	0–2
CD Mairena	3–4	Córdoba CF	2–2	1–2
CMD San Juan	1–2	Écija Balompié	0–0	1–2
Baeza CF	0–2	CP Ejido	0–1	0–1
Vélez CF		CD Málaga		
CD Los Boliches	2–1	CD Iliturgi	2–0	0–1
Algeciras CF	4–3	Racing Club Portuense	3–2	1–1
UD Alzira	0–4	Benidorm CD	0–3	0–1
Atlético Sanluqueño CF	1–1	Recreativo de Huelva	1–1	0–0
RB Linense	0–2	Xerez CD	0–1	0–1
Zamora CF	2–3	CD Numancia	1–0	1–3
CD Binéfar	0–3	Atlético Monzón	0–2	0–1
UD Barbastro	2–2	CF Hernán Cortés	1–0	1–2
CF Balaguer	3–4	FC Andorra	2–1	1–3
CE Premià	0–5	CE Sant Andreu	0–1	0–4
CD Blanes	4–0	Gimnàstic de Tarragona	2–0	2–0
UDA Gramenet	2–3	AEC Manlleu	2–2	0–1
CD Júpiter	3–6	Girona CF	2–1	1–5
EC Granollers	4–1	CFJ Mollerussa	3–0	1–1
Torrent CF	0–0	Torrevieja CF	0–0	0–0
CD Eldense	1–3	Orihuela Deportiva CF	1–1	0–2
CD Móstoles	1–2	CD Leganés	1–1	0–1
SR Villaverde Boetticher CF	1–2	RSD Alcalá	1–0	0–2
CF Rayo Majadahonda	3–9	Aranjuez CF	1–3	2–6
Atlético Astorga	2–6	Cultural y Deportiva Leonesa	0–4	2–2
Gimnástica Segoviana	2–9	CF Palencia	1–4	1–5
CA Bembibre	1–3	SD Ponferradina	0–0	1–3
CD Fuengirola	1–4	CD Estepona	0–3	1–1
CD Manacor	3–3	CF Sporting Mahonés	1–1	2–2
CD Ferriolense	5–2	SD Portmany	4–0	1–2
CD Calvià	2–4	CD Atlético Baleares	2–0	0–4
UD Realejos	3–2	CD Marino Tenerife Sur	3–0	0–2

- Bye: Racing de Ferrol, Deportivo Alavés, Endesa Andorra, SD Ibiza, CD Izarra, Castro FC, CD Alcoyano & UD Gáldar.

== Second round ==
Team 1	Agg.	Team 2	1st leg	2nd leg
SD Burela	1–7	CD Ourense	0–4	1–3
CD Carballiño	9–3	CD Endesa As Pontes	6–0	3–3
Racing de Ferrol	2–1	Pontevedra CF	1–0	1–1
CD Lealtad	3–5	Real Avilés	1–2	2–3
Caudal Deportivo	1–3	Club Hispano de Castrillón	1–1	0–2
SD Almazán	0–4	CD Numancia	0–0	0–4
Cristian Lay CF	3–2	Moralo CP	3–2	0–0
CD Mirandés	2–3	CD Tudelano	1–2	1–3
Real Unión Club	1–3	Deportivo Alavés	0–1	1–2
SD Lemona	1–4	Barakaldo CF	0–2	1–2
SD Huesca	0–6	Endesa Andorra	0–1	0–5
Atlético Monzón	4–5	CF Hernán Cortés	1–2	3–3
CD Blanes	1–6	UE Sant Andreu	0–4	1–2
EC Granollers	1–2	AEC Manlleu	1–1	0–1
FC Andorra	2–5	Girona CF	1–3	1–2
Hércules CF	6–3	Levante UD	3–0	3–3
Real Aranjuez CF	4–0	RSD Alcalá	2–0	2–0
Cultural Leonesa	0–1	UD Salamanca	0–0	0–1
CF Palencia	1–4	SD Ponferradina	1–2	0–2
CF Gimnástico Alcázar	(p) 3–3	Valdepeñas CF	3–2	0–1
CD Atlético Baleares	1–3	SD Ibiza	1–3	0–0
CD Manacor	3–2	CD Ferriolense	1–0	2–2
CD Calahorra	5–1	CD Izarra	3–0	2–1
CD Don Benito	2–4	CF Extremadura	0–1	2–3
Castro FC	3–5	Gimnástica Torrelavega	3–1	0–4
CD Pontejos	2–3	CD Laredo	1–0	1–3
Lliria CF	2–3	CD Alcoyano	1–2	1–1
Benidorm CD	2–1	Orihuela Deportiva CF	1–0	1–1
CD Torrevieja	(p) 0–0	Elche CF	0–0	0–0
Caravaca CF	0–5	Real Murcia CF	0–0	0–5
Roldán AD	0–2	Yeclano CF	0–2	0–0
Vélez CF	1–7	Real Jaén CF	1–2	0–5
CD Los Boliches	1–4	UD Melilla	1–1	0–3
CD Estepona	1–3	Granada CF	1–0	0–3
CD Pozoblanco	0–4	Córdoba CF	0–2	0–2
Recreativo Huelva	1–3	Xerez CD	1–1	0–2
UB Conquense	3–4	Atlético Tomelloso	3–2	0–2
UD Gáldar	1–2	UD Las Palmas	1–1	0–1
UD Realejos	3–2	CD Mensajero	0–0	3–2
Algeciras CF	4–5	Écija Balompié	1–3	3–2
SD Amorebieta	3–4	CD Baskonia	1–4	2–0
CD Leganés	1–4	Getafe CF	0–2	1–2

- Bye: Cartagena FC, CD Maspalomas, CP Ejido, UD Horadada and Utebo FC

== Third round ==
Team 1	Agg.	Team 2	1st leg	2nd leg
Deportivo Alavés	3–4	Sporting Gijón	3–1	0–3
CF Gimnástico Alcázar	5–4	SD Eibar	3–1	2–3
CD Alcoyano	2–5	Real Burgos CF	1–3	1–2
Real Aranjuez CF	1–3	CD Tenerife	0–2	1–1
CD Baskonia	1–2	CD Ourense	1–0	0–2
Benidorm CD	4–3	RC Celta	0–0	4–3
CD Calahorra	0–5	Real Betis	0–2	0–3
CD Carballiño	1–3	Barakaldo CF	1–0	0–3
SD Compostela	3–1	UD Melilla	3–0	1–1
Córdoba CF	4–2	Real Avilés	3–0	1–2
Cristian Lay CF	0–5	CP Mérida	0–3	0–2
Écija Balompié	2–4	CD Lugo	0–1	2–3
Polideportivo Ejido	0–6	Cádiz CF	0–3	0–3
Endesa Andorra	3–6	Villarreal CF	2–1	1–5
CF Extremadura	2–1	Sestao SC	0–1	2–0
Racing Ferrol	2–4	CD Badajoz	1–3	1–1
Getafe CF	3–5	CA Osasuna	3–2	0–3
Girona CF	3–5	Racing Santander	2–2	1–3
Granada CF	0–3	Cartagena FC	0–1	0–2
Hércules CF	1–2	UE Lleida	1–1	0–1
CF Hernán Cortés		UD Las Palmas		
Club Hispano de Castrillón	0–4	CD Logroñés	0–2	0–2
UD Horadada	2–10	Deportivo de La Coruña	1–1	1–9
SD Ibiza	1–3	Real Valladolid	1–3	0–0
CD Laredo		Palamós CF		
CD Manacor	1–2	CE Sabadell FC	1–1	0–1
AEC Manlleu	1–2	RCD Español	1–1	0–1
CD Maspalomas	0–1	Atlético Marbella	0–1	0–0
Real Murcia	2–3	Real Oviedo	0–3	2–0
CD Numancia	3–4	UE Figueres	1–1	2–3
SD Ponferradina	0–6	Sevilla CF	0–3	0–3
UD Realejos	5–1	UB Conquense	4–0	1–1
UD Salamanca	2–2 (p)	CD Torrevieja	0–1	2–1
UE Sant Andreu	2–7	RCD Mallorca	1–2	1–5
Gimnástica Torrelavega	0–4	CD Castellón	0–0	0–4
CD Tudelano	2–10	Rayo Vallecano	1–4	1–6
Utebo FC	1–6	Albacete Balompié	0–1	1–5
Xerez CD	1–0	Athletic Bilbao	1–0	0–0
Yeclano CF	1–2	Real Jaén	0–1	1–1

== Fourth round ==
Team 1	Agg.	Team 2	1st leg	2nd leg
CF Gimnástico Alcázar	0–7	Sevilla FC	0–2	0–5
Barakaldo CF	3–5	CE Sabadell FC	2–1	1–4
Benidorm CD	3–4	Real Betis	2–2	1–2
Cartagena FC	1–0	CD Badajoz	1–0	0–0
Córdoba CF	2–3	CD Lugo	1–1	1–2
CF Extremadura	6–1	Cádiz CF	5–1	1–0
Real Jaén	1–1 (p)	CD Logroñés	0–0	1–1
RCD Mallorca	2–1	CD Castellón	2–0	0–1
Atlético Marbella	1–7	CA Osasuna	0–3	1–4
CP Mérida	1–1 (4–3 p)	Deportivo de La Coruña	1–0	0–1
UD Las Palmas	3–4	SD Compostela	2–2	1–2
CD Ourense	1–2	UE Figueres	1–0	0–2
Racing Santander	3–8	Real Oviedo	1–5	2–3
Rayo Vallecano	2–4	Sporting Gijón	1–0	1–4
UD Realejos	1–5	Albacete Balompié	1–3	0–2
CD Torrevieja	1–5	CD Tenerife	1–0	0–5
Real Valladolid	2–2 (4–3 p)	Real Burgos CF	1–1	1–1
Villarreal CF	6–3	RCD Español	1–2	5–1
Xerez CD	1–1 (4–5 p)	Palamós CF	0–1	1–0

- Bye: UE Lleida

== Fifth round ==
Team 1	Agg.	Team 2	1st leg	2nd leg
Real Betis	2–6	Real Oviedo	2–1	0–5
Cartagena FC	2–6	Real Valladolid	1–2	1–4
CF Extremadura	2–1	CE Sabadell FC	2–1	0–0
Real Jaén	2–2 (5–4 p)	UE Figueres	2–1	0–1
UE Lleida	1–1 (4–3 p)	Palamós CF	0–0	1–1
CD Lugo	0–3	Albacete Balompié	0–3	0–0
RCD Mallorca	4–4 (6–5 p)	CD Tenerife	1–3	3–1
CP Mérida	1–2	Sevilla FC	0–1	1–1
Sporting Gijón	4–3	CA Osasuna	4–1	0–2
Villarreal CF	1–0	SD Compostela	0–0	1–0

== Round of 16 ==
Team 1	Agg.	Team 2	1st leg	2nd leg
Atlético Madrid	0–11	FC Barcelona	0–5	0–6
CF Extremadura	1–4	Real Oviedo	0–2	1–2
UE Lleida	0–3	Real Sociedad	0–0	0–3
Real Jaén	1–2	Villarreal CF	1–0	0–2
RCD Mallorca	2–3	Real Madrid	2–0	0–3
Sevilla FC	0–2	Valencia CF	0–0	0–2
Sporting de Gijón	2–3	Real Zaragoza	1–0	1–3
Real Valladolid	2–2 (4–3 p)	Albacete Balompié	1–0	1–2

== Quarter-finals ==
Team 1	Agg.	Team 2	1st leg	2nd leg
Real Madrid	5–4	Real Sociedad	4–0	1–4
Real Valladolid	1–6	FC Barcelona	1–3	0–3
Villarreal CF	1–8	Valencia CF	1–2	0–6
Real Zaragoza	3–2	Real Oviedo	1–1	2–1

== Semi-finals ==
Team 1	Agg.	Team 2	1st leg	2nd leg
Real Madrid	3–2	FC Barcelona	1–1	2–1
Valencia CF	3–4	Real Zaragoza	1–1	2–3

== Final ==
Team 1	Score	Team 2
Real Madrid	2–0	Real Zaragoza

== Top goalscorers ==
Player	Team	Goals
(Poland) Jan Urban	Osasuna	8
(Spain) Melenas	Extremadura	7
(Spain) José Emilio Amavisca	Valladolid	6
(Uruguay) James Cantero	Murcia	6
(Spain) Pedro Cordero	Cartagena	6
(Spain) Monchu	Sevilla	6
(Spain) Pancorbo	Conquense	6
(Spain) Miguel Ángel Vigón	Lealtad	6
(Chile) Iván Zamorano	Real Madrid	6

Source: BDFútbol
