= UD Fraga =

Association football club in Spain

Fraga
- Full name: Unión Deportiva Fraga
- Founded: 1926
- Ground: La Estacada, Fraga, Aragon, Spain
- Capacity: 3,000
- President: (Spain) Gonzalo Portolés
- Head coach: (Spain) Miguel Rubio
- League: Tercera Federación – Group 17
- 2025–26: Regional Preferente – Group 1, 1st of 18 (champions)
Home colours	Away colours

Unión Deportiva Fraga is a Spanish football team based in Fraga, in the autonomous community of Aragon. Founded in 1947 it plays in Tercera Federación – Group 17, holding home games at La Estacada, with a capacity of 3,000 seats.

== History ==
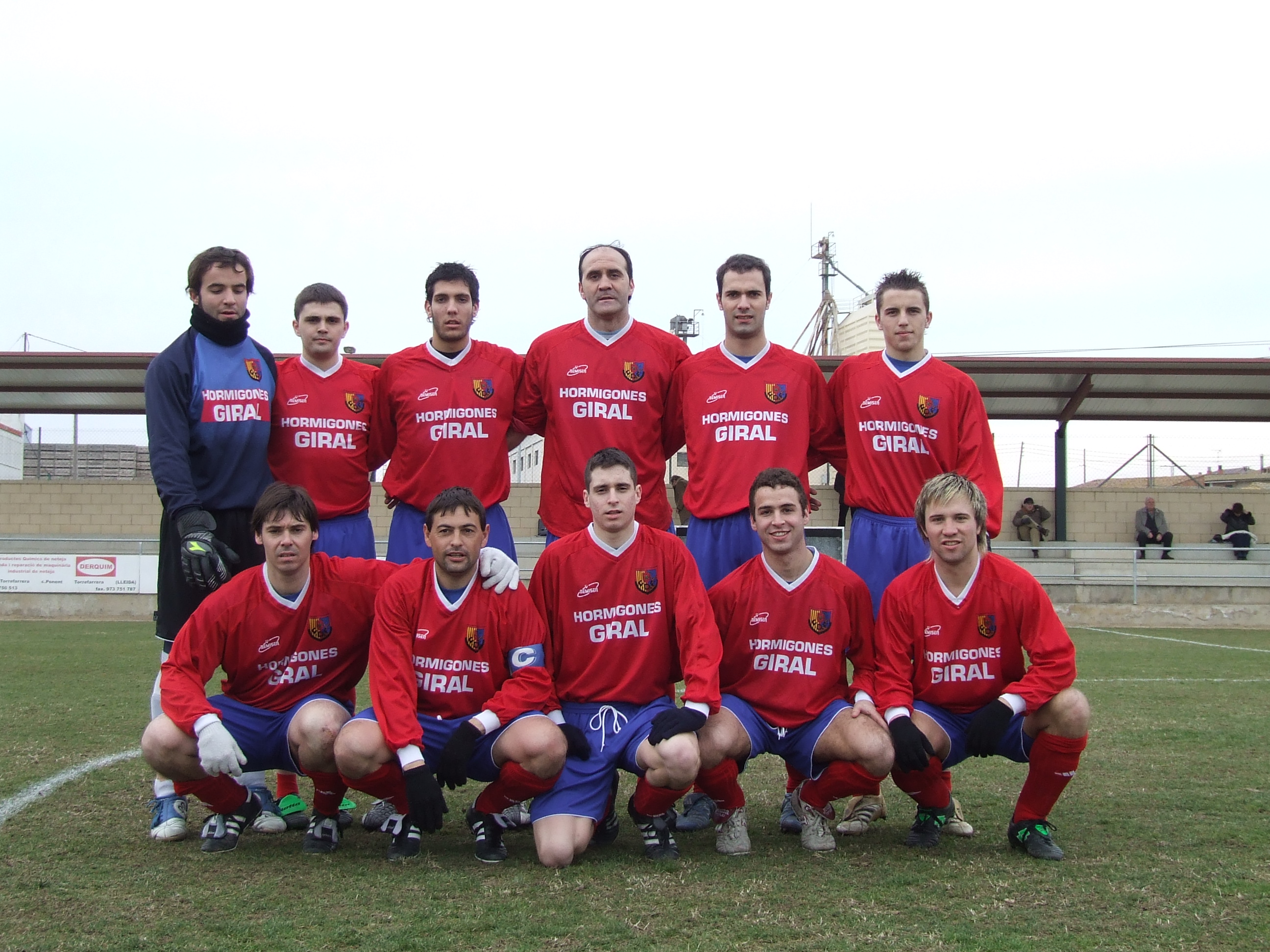
Players of Unión Deportiva Fraga in a match in 2006.

The club was founded in 1926. It debuted for the first time in a national competition of Spain. In 1987 the club was made semi-professional.

=== Club background ===
- Unión Deportiva Fraga (1926–1945; 1947–)
- Atlético Fraga (1945–1947)

== Stadium ==
Fraga plays its games at the La Estacada Stadium, with a capacity of three thousand spectators. Currently the playing surface is made of artificial grass.

== Season to season ==
Season	Tier	Division	Place	Copa del Rey
1946–47	4	1ª Reg.	(R)	
1947–48	4	1ª Reg.	3rd	
1948–1955	DNP			
1955–56	4	1ª Reg.	1st	
1956–57	3	3ª	8th	
1957–58	3	3ª	4th	
1958–59	3	3ª	4th	
1959–60	3	3ª	4th	
1960–61	3	3ª	14th	
1961–62	DNP			
1962–63	4	1ª Reg.	(R)	
1963–64	DNP			
1964–65	4	1ª Reg.	8th	
1965–66	4	1ª Reg.	10th	
1966–67	4	1ª Reg.	15th	
1967–68	4	1ª Reg.	13th	
1968–69	4	Reg. Pref.	6th	
1969–70	4	Reg. Pref.	7th	
1970–71	4	Reg. Pref.	6th	
1971–72	4	Reg. Pref.	8th	

Season	Tier	Division	Place	Copa del Rey
1972–73	4	Reg. Pref.	6th	
1973–74	4	Reg. Pref.	15th	
1974–75	4	Reg. Pref.	3rd	
1975–76	4	Reg. Pref.	3rd	
1976–77	4	Reg. Pref.	11th	
1977–78	5	Reg. Pref.	14th	
1978–79	5	Reg. Pref.	6th	
1979–80	5	Reg. Pref.	15th	
1980–81	5	Reg. Pref.	11th	
1981–82	5	Reg. Pref.	4th	
1982–83	5	Reg. Pref.	2nd	
1983–84	5	Reg. Pref.	4th	
1984–85	5	Reg. Pref.	1st	
1985–86	4	3ª	7th	
1986–87	4	3ª	3rd	
1987–88	3	2ª B	10th	Third round
1988–89	3	2ª B	14th	First round
1989–90	3	2ª B	18th	
1990–91	4	3ª	1st	Second round
1991–92	3	2ª B	17th	Second round

Season	Tier	Division	Place	Copa del Rey
1992–93	4	3ª	8th	First round
1993–94	4	3ª	6th	
1994–95	4	3ª	8th	
1995–96	4	3ª	6th	
1996–97	4	3ª	4th	
1997–98	4	3ª	2nd	
1998–99	4	3ª	7th	
1999–2000	4	3ª	1st	
2000–01	4	3ª	3rd	First round
2001–02	4	3ª	1st	
2002–03	4	3ª	1st	First round
2003–04	4	3ª	5th	First round
2004–05	4	3ª	17th	
2005–06	5	Reg. Pref.	4th	
2006–07	5	Reg. Pref.	1st	
2007–08	4	3ª	16th	
2008–09	4	3ª	16th	
2009–10	4	3ª	19th	
2010–11	5	Reg. Pref.	5th	
2011–12	5	Reg. Pref.	6th	

Season	Tier	Division	Place	Copa del Rey
2012–13	5	Reg. Pref.	3rd	
2013–14	5	Reg. Pref.	3rd	
2014–15	5	Reg. Pref.	1st	
2015–16	4	3ª	20th	
2016–17	5	Reg. Pref.	2nd	
2017–18	4	3ª	17th	
2018–19	5	Reg. Pref.	1st	
2019–20	4	3ª	12th	Preliminary
2020–21	4	3ª	10th / 7th	
2021–22	6	Reg. Pref.	4th	
2022–23	6	Reg. Pref.	1st	
2023–24	5	3ª Fed.	9th	
2024–25	5	3ª Fed.	16th	
2025–26	6	Reg. Pref.	1st	
2026–27	5	3ª Fed.		

- 4 seasons in Segunda División B
- 28 seasons in Tercera División
- 3 seasons in Tercera Federación

== Notable coaches ==
- (Spain) Juan Carlos Oliva
