= CD As Pontes =

Spanish football club

Coordinates: 43.452807°N 7.861457°W

As Pontes
- Full name: Club Deportivo As Pontes
- Nickname: Los azules
- Founded: 1960; 66 years ago
- Stadium: Estadio O Poboado
- Capacity: 4,000
- President: Xaime Castro
- Head coach: Sergio Portela
- League: Segunda Futgal – Ferrol
- 2025–26: Primera Futgal – Group 1, 18th of 18 (relegated)
Home colours	Away colours

Club Deportivo As Pontes is a football team based in As Pontes in the autonomous community of Galicia. Founded in 1960, it plays in the Segunda Futgal – Ferrol. Its stadium is O Poboado with a capacity of 4,000 seats.

== History ==
- Club Deportivo As Pontes was founded in 1960 as Club de Fútbol Calvo Sotelo.

=== CD As Pontes names ===
- Club de Fútbol Calvo Sotelo - (1960–1969)
- Club Deportivo As Pontes - (1969–1984)
- Endesa As Pontes Club de Fútbol - (1984–2001)
- Club Deportivo As Pontes - (2001–)

== Season to season ==
Season	Tier	Division	Place	Copa del Rey
1960–61	4	Serie A	6th	
1961–62	4	Serie A	1st	
1962–63	4	Serie A	2nd	
1963–64	4	Serie A	1st	
1964–65	3	3ª	15th	
1965–66	4	Serie A	2nd	
1966–67	3	3ª	12th	
1967–68	3	3ª	14th	
1968–69	4	Serie A	3rd	
1969–70	4	Serie A	11th	
1970–71	4	Serie A	13th	
1971–72	4	Serie A	17th	
1972–73	5	1ª Reg.	1st	
1973–74	4	Serie A	18th	
1974–75	4	Serie A	18th	
1975–76	5	1ª Reg.	2nd	
1976–77	5	1ª Reg.	4th	
1977–78	6	1ª Reg.	3rd	
1978–79	6	1ª Reg.	5th	
1979–80	6	1ª Reg.	14th	

Season	Tier	Division	Place	Copa del Rey
1980–81	6	1ª Reg.	12th	
1981–82	5	Reg. Pref.	6th	
1982–83	5	Reg. Pref.	5th	
1983–84	5	Reg. Pref.	2nd	
1984–85	4	3ª	17th	
1985–86	4	3ª	2nd	
1986–87	4	3ª	1st	Second round
1987–88	3	2ª B	10th	First round
1988–89	3	2ª B	7th	Second round
1989–90	3	2ª B	14th	
1990–91	3	2ª B	13th	Second round
1991–92	3	2ª B	4th	Second round
1992–93	3	2ª B	17th	Second round
1993–94	4	3ª	3rd	Second round
1994–95	4	3ª	1st	
1995–96	3	2ª B	13th	Second round
1996–97	3	2ª B	15th	
1997–98	3	2ª B	17th	
1998–99	4	3ª	9th	
1999–2000	4	3ª	7th	

Season	Tier	Division	Place	Copa del Rey
2000–01	4	3ª	2nd	
2001–02	4	3ª	18th	First round
2002–03	5	Reg. Pref.	7th	
2003–04	5	Reg. Pref.	6th	
2004–05	5	Reg. Pref.	3rd	
2005–06	5	Reg. Pref.	3rd	
2006–07	5	Pref. Aut.	8th	
2007–08	5	Pref. Aut.	5th	
2008–09	5	Pref. Aut.	9th	
2009–10	5	Pref. Aut.	2nd	
2010–11	4	3ª	11th	
2011–12	4	3ª	16th	
2012–13	4	3ª	6th	
2013–14	4	3ª	5th	
2014–15	4	3ª	14th	
2015–16	4	3ª	10th	
2016–17	4	3ª	18th	
2017–18	5	Pref.	3rd	
2018–19	5	Pref.	1st	
2019–20	4	3ª	17th	

Season	Tier	Division	Place	Copa del Rey
2020–21	4	3ª	10th / 11th	
2021–22	6	Pref.	8th	
2022–23	6	Pref.	16th	
2023–24	6	Pref.	17th	
2024–25	7	1ª Futgal	11th	
2025–26	7	1ª Futgal		

- 9 seasons in Segunda División B
- 20 seasons in Tercera División

== Honours ==
- Tercera División: 1986–87, 1994–95

== Famous players ==
- (Spain) Manuel Carou
- (Spain) Santiago Miguélez
- (Spain) Quico
- (Spain) Repi
- (Spain) David Rochela
- (Spain) Piscu
