= Torrevieja CF =

Torrevieja
- Full name: Torrevieja Club de Fútbol
- Founded: 1971
- Ground: Vicente García, Torrevieja, Valencia, Spain
- Capacity: 6,000
- President: Trinitario Pérez
- 2020–21: Segunda Regional – Group 17, 6th of 13
Home colours	Away colours

Torrevieja Club de Fútbol is a Spanish football team based in Torrevieja, in the Valencian Community. Founded in 1971, it is the youth football of SC Torrevieja CF, holding home matches at Estadio Vicente García.

== History ==
In Torrevieja, football started to become popular during the time of the World War I. The first official ground was inaugurated in 1920, near the town's bus station, with a statue of a footballer being erected in the small plaza behind it in later years.

The first reference to Torrevieja CF is in 1923 and, although there was no official league for the team to play in, friendlies and summer cup competitions were arranged against other teams in the Vega Baja del Segura region. During the Spanish Civil War football came to a standstill, and it was not until the mid-1950s that Torrevieja again had an official team, with both Español Frente de Juventudes (known as el Hueso) and Club Deportivo Torrevejense (known as el Remiendo) being formed, with the peculiarity that no admission was charged, with fans making whatever contribution they could.

Over the next 15 years both of the clubs folded, leaving a void which was filled in 1971 with the foundation of Torrevieja Club de Fútbol. The town's mayor, Vicente García García, and his administration, took on the task of building the football ground, which was named after the politician, being inaugurated with a match with neighbouring Hércules CF.

In 1978, Torrevieja reached the fourth division – the first national category – for the first time ever, competing in that level for ten years after which it promoted again, now to the third level, a spell that ended in the 1992–93 campaign, with the club suffering another relegation in 1994 due to financial irregularities.

A new football club was set up in the town in 1993, Club Deportivo Torrevieja, which started playing in the second regional league. By 1996, the new side was promoted to the competition's top level, as the original club dropped to the second, and was also renamed Fútbol Club Torrevieja, promoted to division four in 1997, but was relegated two seasons later.

Torrevieja CF played in the regional leagues until 2021, when the first team ceased activities and the club's youth setup became a part of Sporting Costablanca Torrevieja Club de Fútbol, a club founded in the previous year.

== Season to season ==
Season	Tier	Division	Place	Copa del Rey
1971–72	6	2ª Reg.	6th	
1972–73	6	2ª Reg.	3rd	
1973–74	6	2ª Reg.	3rd	
1974–75	5	1ª Reg.	4th	
1975–76	5	1ª Reg.	1st	
1976–77	4	Reg. Pref.	7th	
1977–78	5	Reg. Pref.	1st	
1978–79	4	3ª	8th	First round
1979–80	4	3ª	15th	Second round
1980–81	4	3ª	5th	
1981–82	4	3ª	3rd	Second round
1982–83	4	3ª	4th	First round
1983–84	4	3ª	6th	First round
1984–85	4	3ª	11th	First round
1985–86	4	3ª	3rd	
1986–87	4	3ª	4th	Third round
1987–88	4	3ª	1st	Second round
1988–89	3	2ª B	13th	
1989–90	3	2ª B	15th	
1990–91	3	2ª B	11th	Third round

Season	Tier	Division	Place	Copa del Rey
1991–92	3	2ª B	10th	First round
1992–93	3	2ª B	16th	Fourth round
1993–94	5	Reg. Pref.	18th	
1994–95	6	1ª Reg.	14th	
1995–96	6	1ª Reg.	19th	
1996–97	6	1ª Reg.	16th	
1997–98	6	1ª Reg.	15th	
1998–99	7	2ª Reg.	5th	
1999–2000	7	2ª Reg.	9th	
2000–01	7	2ª Reg.	4th	
2001–02	7	2ª Reg.	6th	
2002–03	7	2ª Reg.	3rd	
2003–04	7	2ª Reg.	2nd	
2004–05	6	1ª Reg.	16th	
2005–06	7	2ª Reg.	7th	
2006–07	7	2ª Reg.	7th	
2007–08	7	2ª Reg.	6th	
2008–09	7	2ª Reg.	4th	
2009–10	7	2ª Reg.	4th	
2010–11	7	2ª Reg.	2nd	

Season	Tier	Division	Place	Copa del Rey
2011–12	6	1ª Reg.	14th	
2012–13	7	2ª Reg.	1st	
2013–14	6	1ª Reg.	10th	
2014–15	6	1ª Reg.	7th	
2015–16	6	1ª Reg.	11th	
2016–17	6	1ª Reg.	13th	
2017–18	6	1ª Reg.	16th	
2018–19	7	2ª Reg.	6th	
2019–20	7	2ª Reg.	4th	
2020–21	7	2ª Reg.	6th	

- 5 seasons in Segunda División B
- 10 seasons in Tercera División
