= CFJ Mollerussa =

Association football club in Spain

Mollerussa
- Full name: Club de Futbol Joventut Mollerussa
- Founded: 1919
- Ground: Camp Municipal, Mollerussa, Catalonia, Spain
- Capacity: 4,000
- President: Andreu Subies Forcada
- Head coach: Manel Cazorla
- League: Tercera Federación – Group 5
- 2025–26: Tercera Federación – Group 5, 12th of 18
- Website: www.cfjmollerussa.com
Home colours	Away colours

Club de Futbol Joventut Mollerussa is a football team based in Mollerussa in the autonomous community of Catalonia. Founded in 1930, it plays in Tercera Federación – Group 5. Its stadium is Camp Municipal with a capacity of 4,000 seats.

== History ==
Founded in 1919 as Sporting Club Mollerussa, the club ceased activities in the 1920s and returned in 1930 under the name of Fútbol Club Mollerussa. On 6 November 1953, the club adopted the name of Club de Fútbol Juvenil Mollerusa, switching to Club de Fútbol Juventud Mollerusa in 1957.

Mollerussa played in the regional leagues until 1984, when they achieved a first-ever promotion to Tercera División; three years prior to the promotion, the club already changed their name to the Catalan version, Club de Futbol Joventut Mollerussa. The club first reached the Segunda División B in 1987, and achieved an immediate promotion to Segunda División, playing in the division in the 1988–89 season and having notable players such as Bojan Krkić Sr. (the father of Bojan Krkić).

Immediately relegated back, Mollerussa spent three seasons in the third division before two consecutive relegations followed. In 1994, amidst a severe financial crisis, the club moved down to the Tercera Territorial, the lowest tier in Catalan football. They only returned to a national division in May 2023, after achieving promotion to the Tercera Federación.

== Season to season ==
Season	Tier	Division	Place	Copa del Rey
1930–1946	—	Regional	—	
1946–47	8	4ª Reg.	1st	
1947–48	6	1º Reg. B	3rd	
1948–49	6	1º Reg. B	7th	
1949–50	8	Camp. Com.		
1950–51	8	Camp. Com.	4th	
1951–52	7	2º Reg.	2nd	
1952–53	6	1º Reg. B	16th	
1953–54	7	Camp. Com.		
1954–55	7	Camp. Com.		
1955–56	7	Camp. Com.		
1956–57	7	Camp. Com.		
1957–58	7	Camp. Com.		
1958–59	7	Camp. Com.		
1959–60	7	Camp. Com.	4th	
1960–61	6	Camp. Com.	7th	
1961–62	6	Camp. Com.	2nd	
1962–63	4	1ª Reg.	5th	
1963–64	4	1ª Reg.	2nd	
1964–65	4	1ª Reg.	13th	

Season	Tier	Division	Place	Copa del Rey
1965–66	4	1ª Reg.	11th	
1966–67	4	1ª Reg.	7th	
1967–68	4	1ª Reg.	14th	
1968–69	5	1ª Reg.	12th	
1969–70	5	1ª Reg.	7th	
1970–71	5	1ª Reg.	12th	
1971–72	5	1ª Reg.	20th	
1972–73	6	2º Reg.	18th	
1973–74	7	3º Reg.	2nd	
1974–75	6	2º Reg.	8th	
1975–76	6	2º Reg.	8th	
1976–77	6	2º Reg.	9th	
1977–78	7	2º Reg.	2nd	
1978–79	7	2º Reg.	3rd	
1979–80	7	2º Reg.	1st	
1980–81	6	1ª Reg.	6th	
1981–82	6	1ª Reg.	6th	
1982–83	6	1ª Reg.	1st	
1983–84	5	Reg. Pref.	3rd	
1984–85	4	3ª	17th	

Season	Tier	Division	Place	Copa del Rey
1985–86	4	3ª	1st	
1986–87	4	3ª	2nd	First round
1987–88	3	2ª B	1st	First round
1988–89	2	2ª	20th	Second round
1989–90	3	2ª B	3rd	First round
1990–91	3	2ª B	10th	Second round
1991–92	3	2ª B	19th	First round
1992–93	4	3ª	20th	First round
1993–94	5	1ª Cat.	11th	
1994–95	9	3º Terr.	1st	
1995–96	8	2º Terr.	2nd	
1996–97	7	1º Terr.	2nd	
1997–98	7	1º Terr.	4th	
1998–99	7	1º Terr.	1st	
1999–2000	6	Pref. Terr.	17th	
2000–01	7	1º Terr.	2nd	
2001–02	7	1º Terr.	4th	
2002–03	7	1º Terr.	3rd	
2003–04	7	1º Terr.	1st	
2004–05	6	Pref. Terr.	12th	

Season	Tier	Division	Place	Copa del Rey
2005–06	6	Pref. Terr.	16th	
2006–07	7	1º Terr.	1st	
2007–08	6	Pref. Terr.	18th	
2008–09	7	1º Terr.	2nd	
2009–10	6	Pref. Terr.	10th	
2010–11	6	Pref. Terr.	10th	
2011–12	6	2ª Cat.	11th	
2012–13	6	2ª Cat.	3rd	
2013–14	6	2ª Cat.	1st	
2014–15	5	1ª Cat.	17th	
2015–16	6	2ª Cat.	4th	
2016–17	6	2ª Cat.	3rd	
2017–18	6	2ª Cat.	1st	
2018–19	5	1ª Cat.	5th	
2019–20	5	1ª Cat.	11th	
2020–21	5	1ª Cat.	1st	
2021–22	6	1ª Cat.	2nd	First round
2022–23	6	1ª Cat.	1st	First round
2023–24	5	3ª Fed.	12th	
2024–25	5	3ª Fed.	13th	

Season	Tier	Division	Place	Copa del Rey
2025–26	5	3ª Fed.	12th	
2026–27	5	3ª Fed.		

- 1 season in Segunda División
- 4 seasons in Segunda División B
- 4 seasons in Tercera División
- 4 seasons in Tercera Federación

== Famous players ==
- (Serbia) Bojan Krkić
- (Spain) Antonio Pantoja
- (Spain) Xavier Horcajada

== Famous coaches ==
- (Spain) Lluís Pujol
