= CD Maspalomas =

Spanish football team

Maspalomas
- Full name: Club Deportivo Maspalomas
- Founded: 15 May 1969; 57 years ago
- Ground: Municipal, Maspalomas, San Bartolomé de Tirajana, Gran Canaria, Canary Islands, Spain
- Capacity: 6,000
- President: Orlando Galindo
- Head coach: Carlos Gaumet Ansa
- League: Primera Aficionados Gran Canaria – Group 2
- 2025–26: Primera Aficionados Gran Canaria – Group 2, 10th of 17
Home colours	Away colours

Club Deportivo Maspalomas is a Spanish football team based in Maspalomas, San Bartolomé de Tirajana, Gran Canaria, in the autonomous community of the Canary Islands. Founded in 1969, it plays in Primera Aficionados Gran Canaria – Group 2, holding home matches at Estadio Municipal de Maspalomas.

== History ==
Founded on 15 May 1969 as Club Deportivo San Fernando, the club was renamed to Club Deportivo Maspalomas in 1982, and played in the regional leagues until 1983, when they achieved promotion to Tercera División. In 1987, after finishing first of their group, they achieved promotion to Segunda División B.

Maspalomas returned to the fourth tier in 1990, but achieved an immediate promotion back to the third division, where they stayed for a further three seasons before again dropping a level in 1994. Another relegation followed in 2000, and the club only played a further three campaigns in the fourth tier during the decade before again going down to the regional levels.

== Season to season ==
Season	Tier	Division	Place	Copa del Rey
1976–77	6	3ª Reg.	7th	
1977–78	7	3ª Reg.	4th	
1978–79	7	2ª Reg.	8th	
1979–80	7	2ª Reg.	2nd	
1980–81	6	1ª Reg.	4th	
1981–82	6	1ª Reg.	4th	
1982–83	5	Reg. Pref.	1st	
1983–84	4	3ª	4th	
1984–85	4	3ª	5th	First round
1985–86	4	3ª	1st	First round
1986–87	4	3ª	1st	First round
1987–88	3	2ª B	4th	Third round
1988–89	3	2ª B	14th	Second round
1989–90	3	2ª B	19th	
1990–91	4	3ª	4th	Third round
1991–92	3	2ª B	16th	Second round
1992–93	3	2ª B	12th	Third round
1993–94	3	2ª B	20th	First round
1994–95	4	3ª	14th	First round
1995–96	4	3ª	6th	

Season	Tier	Division	Place	Copa del Rey
1996–97	4	3ª	3rd	
1997–98	4	3ª	15th	
1998–99	4	3ª	16th	
1999–2000	4	3ª	20th	
2000–01	5	Int. Pref.	3rd	
2001–02	4	3ª	19th	
2002–03	5	Int. Pref.	10th	
2003–04	5	Int. Pref.	2nd	
2004–05	4	3ª	14th	
2005–06	4	3ª	18th	
2006–07	5	Int. Pref.	11th	
2007–08	5	Int. Pref.	3rd	
2008–09	5	Int. Pref.	16th	
2009–10	6	1ª Reg.	10th	
2010–11	6	1ª Reg.	5th	
2011–12	6	1ª Reg.	11th	
2012–13	6	1ª Reg.	12th	
2013–14	6	1ª Afic.	9th	
2014–15	6	1ª Afic.	8th	
2015–16	6	1ª Afic.	3rd	

Season	Tier	Division	Place	Copa del Rey
2016–17	5	Int. Pref.	4th	
2017–18	5	Int. Pref.	5th	
2018–19	5	Int. Pref.	7th	
2019–20	5	Int. Pref.	17th	
2020–21	5	Int. Pref.	9th	
2021–22	6	Int. Pref.	1st	
2022–23	6	Int. Pref.	9th	
2023–24	6	Int. Pref.	22nd	
2024–25	7	1ª Afic.	6th	
2025–26	7	1ª Afic.		

- 6 seasons in Segunda División B
- 14 seasons in Tercera División
