= UD Telde =

Telde
- Full name: Unión Deportiva Telde
- Founded: 1961
- Ground: El Hornillo, Telde, Gran Canaria, Canary Islands, Spain
- Capacity: 3,500
- President: Pablo Monzó
- Head coach: Ramón López
- League: Interinsular Preferente
- 2025–26: Tercera Federación – Group 12, 18th of 18 (relegated)
- Website: https://www.udtelde.es/
Home colours	Away colours

Unión Deportiva Telde is a Spanish football team based in Telde, eastern Gran Canaria in the autonomous community of Canary Islands. Founded in 1961, it plays in Interinsular Preferente, holding home matches at Estadio Municipal Pablo Hernández Morales, commonly known as El Hornillo.

== Season to season ==
Season	Tier	Division	Place	Copa del Rey
1965–66	6	3ª Reg.	3rd	
1966–67	5	2ª Reg.	9th	
1967–68	5	2ª Reg.	4th	
1968–69	5	2ª Reg.	7th	
1969–70	5	2ª Reg.	2nd	
1970–71	5	2ª Reg.	3rd	
1971–72	4	1ª Reg.	10th	
1972–73	5	2ª Reg.	12th	
1973–74	5	2ª Reg.	12th	
1974–75	5	2ª Reg.	6th	
1975–76	5	2ª Reg.	6th	
1976–77	5	2ª Reg.	2nd	
1977–78	5	Reg. Pref.	2nd	
1978–79	5	Reg. Pref.	1st	
1979–80	5	Reg. Pref.	2nd	
1980–81	4	3ª	2nd	
1981–82	4	3ª	1st	First round
1982–83	4	3ª	5th	First round
1983–84	4	3ª	13th	First round
1984–85	4	3ª	2nd	

Season	Tier	Division	Place	Copa del Rey
1985–86	4	3ª	8th	First round
1986–87	4	3ª	3rd	
1987–88	3	2ª B	10th	Second round
1988–89	3	2ª B	15th	First round
1989–90	3	2ª B	13th	
1990–91	3	2ª B	19th	First round
1991–92	4	3ª	5th	Third round
1992–93	4	3ª	3rd	First round
1993–94	4	3ª	10th	First round
1994–95	4	3ª	15th	
1995–96	4	3ª	10th	
1996–97	4	3ª	7th	
1997–98	4	3ª	5th	
1998–99	4	3ª	4th	
1999–2000	4	3ª	7th	
2000–01	4	3ª	12th	
2001–02	4	3ª	4th	
2002–03	4	3ª	17th	
2003–04	4	3ª	17th	
2004–05	4	3ª	18th	

Season	Tier	Division	Place	Copa del Rey
2005–06	5	Int. Pref.	12th	
2006–07	5	Int. Pref.	4th	
2007–08	5	Int. Pref.	15th	
2008–09	6	1ª Reg.	3rd	
2009–10	6	1ª Reg.	3rd	
2010–11	5	Int. Pref.	4th	
2011–12	4	3ª	10th	
2012–13	4	3ª	11th	
2013–14	4	3ª	16th	
2014–15	4	3ª	15th	
2015–16	4	3ª	8th	
2016–17	4	3ª	20th	
2017–18	5	Int. Pref.	18th	
2018–19	6	1ª Afic.	17th	
2019–20	6	2ª Afic.	6th	
2020–21	6	1ª Afic.	2nd	
2021–22	6	Int. Pref.	11th	
2022–23	7	1ª Afic.	2nd	
2023–24	6	Int. Pref.	7th	
2024–25	6	Int. Pref.	2nd	

Season	Tier	Division	Place	Copa del Rey
2025–26	5	3ª Fed.		

- 4 seasons in Segunda División B
- 27 seasons in Tercera División
- 1 season in Tercera Federación
