= Bojan Krkić Sr. =

Yugoslav and Serbian footballer and scout (born 1962)

Personal information
- Full name: Bojan Krkić
- Date of birth: 29 July 1962 (age 64)
- Place of birth: Paraćin, PR Serbia, Yugoslavia
- Height: 1.75 m (5 ft 9 in)
- Position: Midfielder

Youth career
- Jedinstvo Paraćin

Senior career*
Years	Team	Apps	(Gls)
1981–1983	OFK Beograd	50	(9)
1984–1986	Sutjeska Nikšić	44	(0)
1987	Rijeka	1	(0)
1988	Radnički Niš	1	(0)
1988–1989	Mollerussa	8	(1)
Total		104	(10)

International career
1981	Yugoslavia U21	2	(0)
- * Club domestic league appearances and goals

Bojan Krkić (Serbian Cyrillic: Бојан Кркић; born 29 July 1962), better known as Bojan Krkić Sr., is a Serbian former footballer who played as a midfielder.

During his footballing career, Krkić represented four Yugoslav First League clubs, most notably OFK Beograd. He also played professionally in Spain.

After retiring from the game, Krkić served as a scout for Barcelona for over a decade. He is the father of former Spain international Bojan Krkić.
