= 1977–78 Tercera División =

Tercera División
- Season: 1977–78

The season 1977-1978 was the first season of new fourth tier, Tercera División.

== Group 1 ==
Pos	Team	Pld	W	D	L	GF	GA	GD	Pts	Promotion or relegation
1	CD Lugo	38	23	4	11	68	33	+35	50	Promotion to the Segunda División B
2	Dep. Gijón	38	17	13	8	55	29	+26	47	
3	Gijón Industrial	38	15	14	9	55	45	+10	44	
4	Ponferradina	38	15	13	10	64	42	+22	43	
5	Gran Peña	38	17	9	12	54	38	+16	43	
6	Fabril Deportivo	38	15	11	12	52	54	−2	41	
7	Real Avilés	38	16	9	13	56	45	+11	41	
8	Club Siero	38	17	6	15	64	53	+11	40	
9	Santoña CF	38	15	9	14	46	49	−3	39	
10	CD Turón	38	16	7	15	49	41	+8	39	
11	Arosa SC	38	15	8	15	49	56	−7	38	
12	Juventud Cambados	38	12	13	13	45	49	−4	37	
13	Valladolid Promesas	38	12	11	15	42	40	+2	35	
14	Venta de Baños	38	12	11	15	40	64	−24	35	
15	CD Naval	38	13	8	17	44	46	−2	34	
16	Rayo Cantabria	38	11	12	15	46	52	−6	34	
17	Club Turista	38	13	7	18	41	62	−21	33	
18	Sp. Celanova	38	13	5	20	37	64	−27	31	
19	Gimnástica Torrelavega	38	9	10	19	40	56	−16	28	Relegation
20	Noya SD	38	6	16	16	30	59	−29	28	Relegation

== Group 2 ==
Pos	Team	Pld	W	D	L	GF	GA	GD	Pts	Promotion or relegation
1	CD Logroñés	38	22	9	7	67	38	+29	53	Promotion to the Segunda División B
2	Dep. Aragón	38	21	8	9	73	36	+37	50	
3	San Sebastián CF	38	23	4	11	59	32	+27	50	
4	CD Guecho	38	20	8	10	71	47	+24	48	
5	CD Sangüesa	38	19	7	12	63	64	−1	45	
6	CD Calahorra	38	16	10	12	62	52	+10	42	
7	SD Lemona	38	15	12	11	48	35	+13	42	
8	Guernica Club	38	15	11	12	63	44	+19	41	
9	SDC Michelín	38	16	8	14	61	52	+9	40	
10	Tolosa CF	38	14	11	13	51	54	−3	39	
11	Munguía	38	16	7	15	55	54	+1	39	
12	CD Motrico	38	16	7	15	56	41	+15	39	
13	Arenas Club	38	15	8	15	52	55	−3	38	
14	SD Valmaseda	38	17	4	17	55	59	−4	38	
15	Peña Sport	38	14	5	19	40	47	−7	33	
16	Burgos Promesas	38	9	12	17	52	63	−11	30	
17	AD Sabiñánigo	38	10	9	19	46	63	−17	29	
18	CD Sariñena	38	10	6	22	37	74	−37	26	Relegation
19	SD Huesca B	38	7	9	22	37	87	−50	23	Relegation
20	CD Izarra	38	6	3	29	27	78	−51	15	Relegation

== Group 3 ==
Pos	Team	Pld	W	D	L	GF	GA	GD	Pts	Promotion or relegation
1	Club Gimnástico	38	22	6	10	70	28	+42	50	Promotion to the Segunda División B
2	UD Figueras	38	24	2	12	74	44	+30	50	
3	Endesa Andorra	38	24	1	13	71	39	+32	49	
4	FC Andorra	38	18	11	9	65	43	+22	47	
5	Barcelona Aficionados	38	19	7	12	65	37	+28	45	
6	Reus Deportivo	38	17	10	11	50	35	+15	44	
7	CD Malgrat	38	16	8	14	57	46	+11	40	
8	CF Gavá	38	17	6	15	54	51	+3	40	
9	CD La Cava	38	17	6	15	47	50	−3	40	
10	CD Hospitalet	38	13	13	12	50	49	+1	39	
11	CD Europa	38	14	10	14	61	52	+9	38	
12	CD Júpiter	38	13	10	15	52	48	+4	36	
13	CF Badalona	38	14	7	17	45	65	−20	35	
14	Sporting Mahonés	38	13	7	18	48	72	−24	33	
15	CA Monzón	38	12	9	17	40	67	−27	33	
16	UA Horta	38	13	5	20	48	71	−23	31	
17	CD Masnou	38	11	9	18	58	63	−5	31	
18	CD Oliana	38	11	8	19	46	80	−34	30	Relegation
19	CD Moncada	38	11	7	20	36	63	−27	29	Relegation
20	UD Vich	38	7	6	25	39	73	−34	20	Relegation

== Group 4 ==
Pos	Team	Pld	W	D	L	GF	GA	GD	Pts	Promotion or relegation
1	Zamora CF	38	21	9	8	52	25	+27	51	Promotion to the Segunda División B
2	Albacete Balompié	38	23	4	11	56	35	+21	50	
3	CD Manchego	38	16	13	9	51	36	+15	45	
4	RSD Alcalá	38	20	5	13	50	38	+12	45	
5	Las Palmas Atlético	38	18	8	12	58	46	+12	44	
6	CD Ciempozuelos	38	17	8	13	55	46	+9	42	
7	CD Carabanchel	38	17	7	14	58	44	+14	41	
8	Toscal CF	38	17	4	17	63	55	+8	38	
9	Gimnástica Arandina	38	15	8	15	44	45	−1	38	
10	CD Valdepeñas	38	14	9	15	44	51	−7	37	
11	Talavera	38	15	7	16	41	51	−10	37	
12	CD Colonia Moscardó	38	15	6	17	48	46	+2	36	
13	CD Toledo	38	12	11	15	36	44	−8	35	
14	CD Salmantino	38	12	10	16	51	51	0	34	
15	AD Arganda	38	14	6	18	55	58	−3	34	
16	CD Leganés	38	11	11	16	45	51	−6	33	
17	SD Almazán	38	10	13	15	38	57	−19	33	
18	UP Plasencia	38	12	8	18	39	56	−17	32	Relegation
19	AD Alcorcón	38	12	6	20	35	60	−25	30	Relegation
20	CD Guadalajara	38	8	9	21	32	56	−24	25	Relegation

== Group 5 ==
Pos	Team	Pld	W	D	L	GF	GA	GD	Pts	Promotion or relegation
1	SD Ibiza	38	24	5	9	52	24	+28	53	Promotion to the Segunda División B
2	Cartagena FC	38	21	10	7	84	29	+55	52	
3	SD Almansa	38	19	10	9	57	29	+28	48	
4	CD Alcoyano	38	17	12	9	67	41	+26	46	
5	Crevillente Deportivo	38	15	11	12	58	45	+13	41	
6	CD Mestalla	38	16	8	14	56	49	+7	40	
7	CF Gandía	38	17	5	16	42	40	+2	39	
8	CD Margaritense	38	16	7	15	39	55	−16	39	
9	CD Villena	38	12	15	11	41	35	+6	39	
10	Paterna CF	38	15	7	16	42	55	−13	37	
11	UD Alcira	38	11	14	13	34	37	−3	36	
12	CD Constancia	38	12	12	14	39	39	0	36	
13	UD Poblense	38	10	16	12	30	31	−1	36	
14	CD Acero	38	15	5	18	41	64	−23	35	
15	Villarreal CF	38	11	12	15	42	36	+6	34	
16	UD Español SVR	38	12	8	18	46	55	−9	32	
17	Orihuela Deportiva	38	14	3	21	35	45	−10	31	
18	SD Portmany	38	10	9	19	45	78	−33	29	Relegation
19	UD Porreras	38	10	9	19	37	75	−38	29	Relegation
20	Yeclano CF	38	8	12	18	29	54	−25	28	Relegation

== Group 6 ==
Pos	Team	Pld	W	D	L	GF	GA	GD	Pts	Promotion or relegation
1	CD Cacereño	38	22	9	7	55	22	+33	53	Promotion to the Segunda División B
2	CD San Fernando	38	23	6	9	67	30	+37	52	
3	RB Linense	38	20	9	9	47	21	+26	49	
4	Gimnástico Melilla	38	17	12	9	56	39	+17	46	
5	Úbeda CF	38	18	7	13	55	34	+21	43	
6	CF Extremadura	38	15	11	12	53	48	+5	41	
7	Carolinense	38	16	8	14	46	46	0	40	
8	Mérida Industrial	38	14	12	12	37	34	+3	40	
9	CD Motril	38	16	7	15	41	33	+8	39	
10	Iliturgi CF	38	16	7	15	46	48	−2	39	
11	Puerto Real CF	38	14	9	15	42	42	0	37	
12	Betis Deportivo	38	15	6	17	44	47	−3	36	
13	Jerez Industrial	38	11	12	15	37	48	−11	34	
14	At. Malagueño	38	15	3	20	36	41	−5	33	
15	Vélez CF	38	15	3	20	35	58	−23	33	
16	CD Estepona	38	10	13	15	43	55	−12	33	
17	CD Don Benito	38	13	7	18	59	63	−4	33	
18	Atlético Marbella	38	12	8	18	37	57	−20	32	Relegation
19	UD Montijo	38	10	7	21	48	70	−22	27	Relegation
20	Atlético Ceuta	38	4	12	22	26	74	−48	20	Relegation
