= UD Alzira =

Alzira
- Full name: Unión Deportiva Alzira
- Nicknames: Tigres de la Ribera, Alziristas, Blaugranas, Ribereños
- Founded: 1946; 80 years ago
- Ground: Luis Suñer Picó, Alzira, Valencia, Spain
- Capacity: 5,000
- President: Juan Antonio Sanjuán Pellicer
- Head coach: Pau Quesada
- League: Tercera Federación – Group 6
- 2024–25: Segunda Federación – Group 3, 16th of 18 (relegated)
- Website: www.udalzira.com
Home colours	Away colours

Unión Deportiva Alzira is a Spanish football team based in Alzira, in the autonomous community of Valencia. Founded in 1946, it plays in Tercera Federación – Group 6, holding home games at Estadio Luis Suñer Picó, with a capacity of 5,000 seats.

== History ==
From 1943 on, new local clubs started emerging in Alzira. Among them was C.D. Mercurio, the base of which served to form Unión Deportiva Alzira in 1946.

=== Background ===
- Alcira Foot-Ball Club — (1922–26)
- Agrupación Deportiva Alzira — (1931–42)
- Unión Deportiva Alzira — (1946–)

== Season to season ==
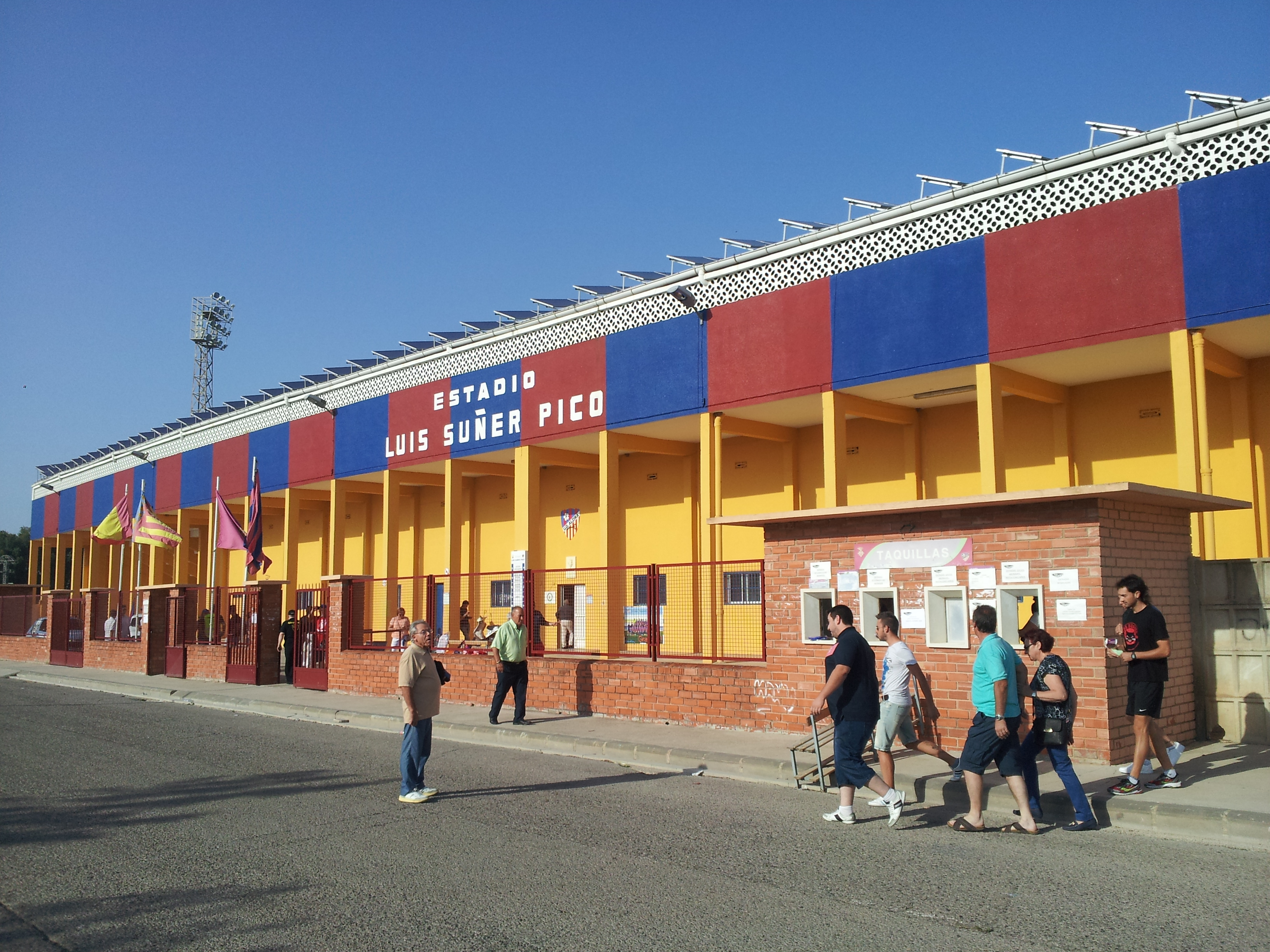
Estadio Luis Suñer Picó

Season	Tier	Division	Place	Copa del Rey
1946–47	6	3ª Reg.	1st	
1947–48	5	2ª Reg.	3rd	
1948–49	5	2ª Reg.	1st	
1949–50	4	1ª Reg.	2nd	
1950–51	4	1ª Reg.	2nd	
1951–52	4	1ª Reg.	1st	
1952–53	3	3ª	10th	
1953–54	3	3ª	9th	
1954–55	3	3ª	6th	
1955–56	3	3ª	7th	
1956–57	3	3ª	6th	
1957–58	3	3ª	9th	
1958–59	3	3ª	11th	
1959–60	3	3ª	5th	
1960–61	3	3ª	7th	
1961–62	3	3ª	13th	
1962–63	3	3ª	11th	
1963–64	3	3ª	2nd	
1964–65	3	3ª	15th	
1965–66	3	3ª	18th	

Season	Tier	Division	Place	Copa del Rey
1966–67	4	1ª Reg.	2nd	
1967–68	3	3ª	13th	
1968–69	4	1ª Reg.	1st	
1969–70	3	3ª	10th	First round
1970–71	4	Reg. Pref.	3rd	
1971–72	4	Reg. Pref.	2nd	
1972–73	4	Reg. Pref.	1st	
1973–74	3	3ª	13th	Second round
1974–75	4	Reg. Pref.	7th	
1975–76	4	Reg. Pref.	4th	
1976–77	4	Reg. Pref.	1st	
1977–78	4	3ª	11th	First round
1978–79	4	3ª	6th	First round
1979–80	4	3ª	19th	Third round
1980–81	4	3ª	7th	
1981–82	4	3ª	17th	
1982–83	5	Reg. Pref.	1st	
1983–84	4	3ª	1st	
1984–85	4	3ª	2nd	Second round
1985–86	4	3ª	1st	Second round

Season	Tier	Division	Place	Copa del Rey
1986–87	3	2ª B	10th	First round
1987–88	3	2ª B	1st	First round
1988–89	2	2ª	18th	First round
1989–90	3	2ª B	7th	First round
1990–91	3	2ª B	8th	Second round
1991–92	3	2ª B	20th	Second round
1992–93	4	3ª	14th	First round
1993–94	4	3ª	19th	
1994–95	5	Reg. Pref.	9th	
1995–96	5	Reg. Pref.	4th	
1996–97	5	Reg. Pref.	1st	
1997–98	5	Reg. Pref.	2nd	
1998–99	4	3ª	4th	
1999–2000	3	2ª B	14th	First round
2000–01	3	2ª B	18th	
2001–02	4	3ª	6th	
2002–03	4	3ª	19th	
2003–04	5	Reg. Pref.	3rd	
2004–05	5	Reg. Pref.	6th	
2005–06	5	Reg. Pref.	2nd	

Season	Tier	Division	Place	Copa del Rey
2006–07	4	3ª	15th	
2007–08	4	3ª	1st	
2008–09	3	2ª B	17th	Second round
2009–10	4	3ª	2nd	
2010–11	3	2ª B	17th	
2011–12	4	3ª	4th	
2012–13	4	3ª	3rd	
2013–14	4	3ª	2nd	
2014–15	4	3ª	14th	
2015–16	4	3ª	6th	
2016–17	4	3ª	2nd	
2017–18	4	3ª	9th	
2018–19	4	3ª	14th	
2019–20	4	3ª	2nd	
2020–21	4	3ª	1st / 2nd	
2021–22	4	2ª RFEF	7th	First round
2022–23	4	2ª Fed.	12th	
2023–24	4	2ª Fed.	8th	
2024–25	4	2ª Fed.	16th	
2025–26	5	3ª Fed.	17th	

Season	Tier	Division	Place	Copa del Rey
2026–27	6	Lliga Com.		

- 1 season in Segunda División
- 9 seasons in Segunda División B
- 4 seasons in Segunda Federación/Segunda División RFEF
- 43 seasons in Tercera División
- 1 season in Tercera Federación
- 22 seasons in Categorías Regionales

== Players ==
=== Current squad ===
As of 1 March 2024

Note: Flags indicate national team as defined under FIFA eligibility rules; some limited exceptions apply. Players may hold more than one non-FIFA nationality.

No.	Pos.	Nation	Player
1	GK	ESP	Vicent Dolz
2	DF	ESP	Abraham Peleteiro
3	DF	ESP	Nacho Vila
4	DF	ESP	Robert Costa
5	DF	ESP	Sergio Bono
6	MF	ESP	Roberto Laurel
7	FW	ESP	Tofol Montiel
8	MF	ESP	Joaquín Rodríguez
9	FW	ESP	Giovanni Navarro
10	FW	ESP	Koke Sáiz
11	FW	ESP	Manel Busquets
12	DF	ESP	José Solbes

No.	Pos.	Nation	Player
13	GK	ESP	Leandro Montagud
14	MF	ESP	Unai Veiga
15	DF	ESP	Marcos Bravo
16	FW	ESP	Dylan Iglesias
17	DF	ESP	Miguel Ángel Ruiz
18	MF	GEO	Lado Mokhevishvili
19	FW	ESP	Pablo Palacín
20	MF	ESP	Víctor Sala
21	FW	ESP	Sergio González
22	GK	ESP	Álvaro Cortés
25	FW	UKR	Mykyta Aleksandrov (on loan from Villarreal C)
