= José Luis Montes =

Spanish footballer and manager

Personal information
- Full name: José Luis Montes Vicente
- Date of birth: 10 August 1956
- Place of birth: Segovia, Spain
- Date of death: 18 August 2013 (aged 57)
- Height: 1.86 m (6 ft 1 in)
- Position: Goalkeeper

Youth career
- Real Madrid

Senior career*
| Years | Team | Apps | (Gls) |
| 1977–1981 | Real Madrid B | 5 | (0) |
| 1977–1978 | → Español San Vicente (loan) | | |
| 1979–1980 | → Getafe Deportivo (loan) | 10 | (0) |
| 1980–1981 | → Alcalá (loan) | | |
| 1981–1983 | Valladolid | 12 | (0) |
| 1983–1986 | Deportivo La Coruña | 88 | (0) |
| 1986–1988 | Hércules | 42 | (0) |
| 1988–1989 | Lorca Deportiva | 35 | (0) |
| 1989–1994 | Melilla | 158 | (0) |
| Total | | 351 | (0) |

Managerial career
- 1999–2002: Écija
- 2002–2004: Algeciras
- 2004–2005: Melilla
- 2005–2006: Sabadell
- 2006–2007: Cartagena
- 2007–2008: Algeciras
- 2008–2010: Marbella
- 2010–2011: Cacereño
- 2011–2012: Conquense
- 2012–2013: Villanovense
- * Club domestic league appearances and goals

José Luis Montes Vicente (10 August 1956 – 18 August 2013) was a Spanish professional football player and manager.

== Career ==
Born in Segovia, Montes played as a goalkeeper for Real Madrid Castilla, Getafe Deportivo, Real Valladolid, Deportivo de La Coruña, Hércules CF, CF Lorca Deportiva and UD Melilla.

He later became a football manager, and was in charge of Écija, Algeciras, Melilla, Sabadell, Cartagena, Marbella, Cacereño, Conquense and Villanovense.

== Death ==
He died on 18 August 2013.
