= 1988–89 Tercera División =

Tercera División
- Season: 1988–89

The 1988–89 Tercera División season is the 12th season since establishment the tier four.

== League table ==
=== Group 1 ===
Pos	Team	Pld	W	D	L	GF	GA	GD	Pts	Promotion or relegation
1	Cambados	38	26	7	5	77	28	+49	59	Promotion to the Segunda División B
2	Juvenil P.	38	16	14	8	56	35	+21	46	
3	Compostela	38	16	13	9	53	30	+23	45	
4	Barco	38	17	9	12	58	46	+12	43	
5	Fabril	38	13	17	8	56	42	+14	43	
6	Lemos	38	11	21	6	40	30	+10	43	
7	Villalonga	38	13	16	9	43	32	+11	42	
8	Gran Peña	38	12	18	8	45	38	+7	42	
9	Vivero	38	14	11	13	50	44	+6	39	
10	Boiro	38	15	9	14	46	51	−5	39	
11	Vista Alegre	38	12	12	14	50	60	−10	36	
12	Brigantium	38	15	6	17	45	51	−6	36	
13	Tyde	38	12	12	14	47	58	−11	36	
14	Puebla	38	12	11	15	36	48	−12	35	
15	Gondomar	38	12	10	16	45	55	−10	34	
16	Corujo	38	12	7	19	35	49	−14	31	
17	Alondras	38	9	12	17	35	54	−19	30	Relegation
18	Sada	38	9	12	17	40	59	−19	30	Relegation
19	Céltiga	38	12	5	21	43	65	−22	29	Relegation
20	At. Orense	38	5	12	21	32	57	−25	22	Relegation

=== Group 2 ===
Pos	Team	Pld	W	D	L	GF	GA	GD	Pts	Promotion or relegation
1	Sporting Atlético	38	27	8	3	89	22	+67	62	Promotion to the Segunda División B
2	Turón	38	22	6	10	51	39	+12	50	
3	Caudal	38	17	16	5	52	30	+22	50	
4	Praviano	38	16	12	10	37	27	+10	44	
5	Asturias de Blimea	38	15	13	10	32	25	+7	43	
6	Mosconia	38	14	15	9	49	37	+12	43	
7	Real Titánico	38	16	11	11	51	40	+11	43	
8	Hispano	38	15	12	11	61	42	+19	42	
9	Ribadesella	38	14	12	12	45	33	+12	40	
10	Marino	38	13	14	11	42	40	+2	40	
11	Piloñesa	38	17	5	16	36	48	−12	39	
12	Lugones	38	14	9	15	45	49	−4	37	
13	Pumarín	38	10	16	12	44	54	−10	36	
14	Luarca	38	12	12	14	40	51	−11	36	
15	Lenense	38	11	10	17	40	50	−10	32	
16	Europa de Nava	38	9	13	16	40	55	−15	31	
17	Siero	38	7	16	15	30	45	−15	30	
18	San Martín	38	9	11	18	29	49	−20	29	Relegation
19	Atlético Camocha	38	8	8	22	44	60	−16	24	Relegation
20	El Entrego	38	2	5	31	25	86	−61	9	Relegation

=== Group 3 ===
Pos	Team	Pld	W	D	L	GF	GA	GD	Pts	Promotion or relegation
1	Laredo	42	33	6	3	102	27	+75	72	Promotion to the Segunda División B
2	Castro	42	32	8	2	89	17	+72	72	
3	Rayo Cantabria	42	32	6	4	118	21	+97	70	
4	Gim. Torrelavega	42	28	6	8	80	29	+51	62	
5	Vimenor	42	23	8	11	60	39	+21	54	
6	Unión Club	42	21	7	14	67	45	+22	49	
7	Guarnizo	42	17	9	16	67	72	−5	43	
8	Reocín	42	12	19	11	44	42	+2	43	
9	Naval	42	18	7	17	63	50	+13	43	
10	Ramales	42	18	6	18	64	60	+4	42	
11	Cayón	42	16	10	16	57	53	+4	42	
12	Ayrón Vargas	42	17	7	18	45	58	−13	41	
13	Marina Cudeyo	42	15	10	17	60	67	−7	40	
14	Barreda	42	14	11	17	50	58	−8	39	
15	Pontejos	42	12	10	20	49	67	−18	34	
16	Gama	42	12	10	20	54	72	−18	34	
17	Noja	42	10	13	19	44	68	−24	33	
18	Velarde	42	7	13	22	39	72	−33	27	Relegation
19	Ribamontán	41	9	6	26	44	80	−36	24	Relegation
20	Albericia	42	9	5	28	38	106	−68	23	Relegation
21	Sámano	41	5	9	27	24	65	−41	19	Relegation
22	Lope de Vega	42	3	10	29	43	133	−90	16	Relegation

- Sámano - Ribamontán not played.

=== Group 4 ===
Pos	Team	Pld	W	D	L	GF	GA	GD	Pts	Promotion or relegation
1	Santurtzi	38	23	9	6	71	30	+41	55	Promotion to the Segunda División B
2	D. Alavés	38	21	10	7	59	29	+30	52	
3	Touring	38	20	10	8	58	39	+19	50	
4	Zalla	38	18	11	9	46	31	+15	47	
5	Tolosa	38	15	14	9	42	28	+14	44	
6	Real Unión	38	16	10	12	65	45	+20	42	
7	Larramendi	38	13	14	11	38	34	+4	40	
8	Munguía	38	14	10	14	45	35	+10	38	
9	Mondragón	38	11	14	13	47	47	0	36	
10	Galdakao	38	15	6	17	43	48	−5	36	
11	Hernani	38	14	7	17	51	62	−11	35	
12	Anaitasuna	38	14	7	17	49	61	−12	35	
13	Aurrerá Ondarroa	38	13	9	16	29	35	−6	35	
14	Arenas Guecho	38	12	10	16	37	42	−5	34	
15	Gernika	38	11	12	15	27	42	−15	34	
16	Pasajes	38	9	15	14	24	38	−14	33	
17	Amorebieta	38	9	15	14	44	55	−11	33	
18	Aurrerá Vitoria	38	11	11	16	42	48	−6	33	Relegation
19	Mutriku	38	6	12	20	21	54	−33	24	Relegation
20	Alegría	38	5	14	19	32	67	−35	24	Relegation

=== Group 5 ===
Pos	Team	Pld	W	D	L	GF	GA	GD	Pts	Promotion or relegation
1	Girona	42	27	8	7	93	46	+47	62	Promotion to the Segunda División B
2	Manlleu	42	23	10	9	70	41	+29	56	Promotion to the Segunda División B
3	Sant Andreu	42	20	12	10	72	42	+30	52	
4	Blanes	42	22	8	12	78	50	+28	52	
5	Olot	42	21	9	12	75	59	+16	51	
6	Reus	42	19	12	11	61	40	+21	50	
7	Manresa	42	18	14	10	66	46	+20	50	
8	Martinenc	42	20	8	14	59	40	+19	48	
9	Lloret	42	18	11	13	75	62	+13	47	
10	Banyoles	42	16	13	13	57	54	+3	45	
11	Esplugues	42	17	11	14	55	49	+6	45	
12	Gramanet	42	15	13	14	60	59	+1	43	
13	Igualada	42	14	14	14	58	61	−3	42	
14	Horta	42	15	10	17	72	80	−8	40	
15	Balaguer	42	13	13	16	47	59	−12	39	
16	Júpiter	42	13	10	19	62	75	−13	36	
17	Vilafranca	42	11	12	19	59	75	−16	34	
18	Badalona	42	10	12	20	45	71	−26	32	Relegation
19	Tortosa	42	10	8	24	43	82	−39	28	Relegation
20	S. Cristóbal	42	7	11	24	48	76	−28	25	Relegation
21	Vic	42	6	13	23	41	76	−35	25	Relegation
22	Calella	42	7	8	27	38	91	−53	22	Relegation

=== Group 6 ===
Pos	Team	Pld	W	D	L	GF	GA	GD	Pts	Promotion or relegation
1	Benidorm	42	29	9	4	86	21	+65	67	Promotion to the Segunda División B
2	Burriana	42	27	8	7	71	34	+37	62	
3	Mestalla	42	26	8	8	89	35	+54	60	
4	Onteniente	42	21	14	7	67	32	+35	56	
5	Alacuás	42	21	7	14	60	52	+8	49	
6	Onda	42	16	15	11	43	34	+9	47	
7	Torrent	42	16	14	12	60	46	+14	46	
8	Vall de Uxó	42	16	14	12	63	51	+12	46	
9	Betxí	42	14	15	13	54	39	+15	43	
10	Villajoyosa	42	17	8	17	54	49	+5	42	
11	Pego	42	14	13	15	43	43	0	41	
12	Algemesí	42	12	17	13	33	41	−8	41	
13	Acero	42	14	10	18	52	63	−11	38	
14	Sueca	42	14	10	18	53	49	+4	38	
15	Denia	42	12	14	16	43	62	−19	38	
16	Aspense	42	13	10	19	46	59	−13	36	
17	Ilicitano	42	10	15	17	38	54	−16	35	
18	Alicante	42	11	10	21	32	70	−38	32	
19	Requena	42	10	11	21	31	54	−23	31	
20	Saguntino	42	8	11	23	43	76	−33	27	
21	Canals	42	5	17	20	17	56	−39	27	
22	Benicarló	42	5	12	25	28	86	−58	22	Relegation

=== Group 7 ===
Pos	Team	Pld	W	D	L	GF	GA	GD	Pts	Promotion or relegation
1	Moscardó	38	22	10	6	63	31	+32	54	Promotion to the Segunda División B
2	Móstoles	38	24	6	8	79	37	+42	54	
3	Parla	38	22	9	7	72	34	+38	53	
4	R. Madrid Aficionados	38	21	8	9	63	27	+36	50	
5	Fuenlabrada	38	22	4	12	77	43	+34	48	
6	Carabanchel	38	16	12	10	53	40	+13	44	
7	San Fernando	38	16	11	11	61	53	+8	43	
8	Navalcarnero	38	15	9	14	49	47	+2	39	
9	Rayo Vallecano	38	17	4	17	61	68	−7	38	
10	Colmenar	38	14	8	16	55	58	−3	36	
11	Alcobendas	38	14	8	16	47	55	−8	36	
12	Vicálvaro	38	15	6	17	59	60	−1	36	
13	Pelayo	38	10	15	13	55	59	−4	35	
14	Valdemoro	38	14	5	19	53	50	+3	33	
15	Rayo Majadahonda	38	12	9	17	39	53	−14	33	
16	Vallecas	38	12	9	17	41	51	−10	33	
17	Aranjuez	38	9	12	17	44	56	−12	30	
18	Fuencarral	38	10	10	18	47	68	−21	30	Relegation
19	Ciempozuelos	38	9	10	19	39	68	−29	28	Relegation
20	Pozuelo	38	2	3	33	24	123	−99	7	Relegation

=== Group 8 ===
Pos	Team	Pld	W	D	L	GF	GA	GD	Pts	Promotion or relegation
1	Numancia	38	23	12	3	89	22	+67	58	Promotion to the Segunda División B
2	Lermeño	38	21	12	5	76	33	+43	54	
3	Cristo Olímpico	38	20	11	7	75	38	+37	51	
4	Valladolid Promesas	38	20	10	8	67	40	+27	50	
5	Almazán	38	19	9	10	80	50	+30	47	
6	Salmantino	38	16	14	8	43	27	+16	46	
7	Gim. Segoviana	38	16	9	13	65	61	+4	41	
8	Zamora	38	16	9	13	63	63	0	41	
9	Astorga	38	13	14	11	42	47	−5	40	
10	B. San José	38	12	13	13	47	50	−3	37	
11	Bembibre	38	12	13	13	44	47	−3	37	
12	Benavente	38	10	14	14	48	60	−12	34	
13	Arandina	38	12	9	17	52	69	−17	33	
14	C. León	38	8	16	14	45	51	−6	32	
15	Endesa Ponf.	38	9	13	16	38	65	−27	31	
16	Hullera	38	8	14	16	39	69	−30	30	
17	Herrera	38	9	11	18	50	71	−21	29	
18	Ejido	38	8	11	19	37	62	−25	27	Relegation
19	Toreno	38	4	17	17	27	52	−25	25	Relegation
20	Cacabelense	38	4	9	25	25	75	−50	17	Relegation

=== Group 9 ===
Pos	Team	Pld	W	D	L	GF	GA	GD	Pts	Promotion or relegation
1	Estepona	40	28	9	3	84	17	+67	65	Promotion to the Segunda División B
2	Los Boliches	40	25	6	9	81	31	+50	56	
3	At. Malagueño	40	17	17	6	80	42	+38	51	
4	Ronda	40	21	8	11	64	33	+31	50	
5	Fuengirola	40	18	13	9	70	61	+9	49	
6	Martos	40	22	4	14	68	45	+23	48	
7	Poli. Ejido	40	20	8	12	63	48	+15	48	
8	Motril	40	18	11	11	45	39	+6	47	
9	Úbeda	40	17	11	12	67	56	+11	45	
10	Guadix	40	17	11	12	65	45	+20	45	
11	Mijas	40	15	11	14	51	49	+2	41	
12	El Palo	40	14	11	15	71	65	+6	39	
13	At. Macael	40	13	12	15	43	42	+1	38	
14	Torremolinos	40	15	7	18	56	65	−9	37	
15	Antequerano	40	11	13	16	37	59	−22	35	
16	San Pedro	40	12	9	19	52	77	−25	33	
17	Benamiel	40	9	13	18	39	58	−19	31	
18	Mojácar	40	6	14	20	33	63	−30	26	Relegation
19	La Zubia	40	6	9	25	35	75	−40	21	Relegation
20	Coín	40	5	9	26	34	100	−66	19	Relegation
21	Barea	40	4	8	28	33	101	−68	16	Relegation

=== Group 10 ===
Pos	Team	Pld	W	D	L	GF	GA	GD	Pts	Promotion or relegation
1	Utrera	38	27	5	6	90	26	+64	59	Promotion to the Segunda División B
2	Lebrija	38	24	9	5	67	29	+38	57	
3	Écija	38	22	6	10	76	26	+50	50	
4	Coria	38	18	9	11	53	32	+21	45	
5	Ayamonte	38	18	9	11	57	37	+20	45	
6	Cádiz B	38	19	7	12	66	43	+23	45	
7	San Roque	38	16	12	10	48	29	+19	44	
8	Dos Hermanas	38	12	15	11	41	42	−1	39	
9	San Fernando	38	14	10	14	39	44	−5	38	
10	Chiclana	38	16	6	16	45	50	−5	38	
11	Portuense	38	11	15	12	49	47	+2	37	
12	Palma Río	38	15	7	16	47	52	−5	37	
13	Rota	38	14	8	16	40	54	−14	36	
14	Puerto Real	38	12	11	15	35	40	−5	35	
15	Montilla	38	15	5	18	42	48	−6	35	
16	Santaella	38	13	8	17	47	53	−6	34	
17	Pilas	38	11	6	21	42	63	−21	28	Relegation
18	Miramar	38	9	4	25	31	89	−58	22	Relegation
19	Bollullos	38	4	10	24	25	71	−46	18	Relegation
20	Brenes	38	3	12	23	22	87	−65	18	Relegation

=== Group 11 ===
Pos	Team	Pld	W	D	L	GF	GA	GD	Pts	Promotion or relegation
1	Mallorca At.	40	33	5	2	120	28	+92	71	Promotion to the Segunda División B
2	Ibiza	40	23	9	8	79	29	+50	55	Promotion to the Segunda División B
3	Alayor	40	22	10	8	64	30	+34	54	
4	Manacor	40	19	11	10	67	43	+24	49	
5	Cade Paguera	40	17	14	9	55	34	+21	48	
6	Santa Eulalia	40	19	8	13	54	45	+9	46	
7	Felanitx	40	18	9	13	61	57	+4	45	
8	Constancia	40	16	10	14	45	44	+1	42	
9	Llosetense	40	16	10	14	56	64	−8	42	
10	Portmany	40	17	7	16	51	42	+9	41	
11	Hospitalet	40	16	9	15	48	45	+3	41	
12	Ferrerías	40	11	16	13	34	39	−5	38	
13	Isleño	40	13	10	17	45	59	−14	36	
14	Sóller	40	10	15	15	55	59	−4	35	
15	Arenal	40	13	8	19	42	72	−30	34	
16	Cala d'Or	40	11	11	18	49	79	−30	33	
17	Alcudia	40	8	16	16	51	64	−13	32	Relegation
18	Alaró	40	7	15	18	39	62	−23	29	Relegation
19	Santañy	40	11	7	22	41	63	−22	29	Relegation
20	Calviá	40	3	15	22	39	76	−37	21	Relegation
21	Murense	40	5	9	26	33	94	−61	19	Relegation

=== Group 12 ===
Pos	Team	Pld	W	D	L	GF	GA	GD	Pts	Promotion or relegation
1	Salud	44	26	10	8	82	53	+29	62	Promotion to the Segunda División B
2	Las Palmas At.	44	27	6	11	98	30	+68	60	
3	Tenisca	44	24	10	10	50	26	+24	58	
4	Ferreras	44	22	12	10	70	57	+13	56	
5	Puerto Cruz	44	21	11	12	86	58	+28	53	
6	Corralejo	44	23	5	16	68	51	+17	51	
7	Mensajero	44	18	12	14	70	55	+15	48	
8	Ibarra	44	17	13	14	73	52	+21	47	
9	Aridane	44	19	8	17	71	59	+12	46	
10	Artesano	44	17	12	15	60	59	+1	44 (Note: Artesano & Icodense were docked 2 points.)	
11	Águilas	44	16	10	18	68	76	−8	42	
12	Icodense	44	19	6	19	68	78	−10	42	
13	At. Paso	44	13	15	16	44	44	0	41	
14	Arguineguín	44	18	5	21	65	75	−10	41	
15	Laguna	44	17	6	21	54	77	−23	40	
16	Orotava	44	14	11	19	59	55	+4	39	
17	Gomera	44	17	5	22	46	67	−21	39	
18	Arucas	44	14	11	19	59	61	−2	39	Relegation
19	Atalaya	44	12	14	18	63	82	−19	38	Relegation
20	San Andrés	44	12	14	18	47	55	−8	38	Relegation
21	Lanzarote	44	13	10	21	40	64	−24	36	Relegation
22	San Antonio	44	12	6	26	56	84	−28	30	Relegation
23	Santa Brígida	44	4	10	30	37	116	−79	18	Relegation

=== Group 13 ===
Pos	Team	Pld	W	D	L	GF	GA	GD	Pts	Promotion or relegation
1	Orihuela	38	27	8	3	79	20	+59	62	Promotion to the Segunda División B
2	Yeclano	38	19	14	5	66	27	+39	52	
3	Olímpico T.	38	20	8	10	69	37	+32	48	
4	Abarán	38	17	13	8	49	39	+10	47	
5	Cox	38	18	9	11	42	38	+4	45	
6	Santomera	38	19	7	12	53	39	+14	45	
7	Cieza	38	17	10	11	52	39	+13	44	
8	Dolores	38	17	9	12	55	42	+13	43	
9	Imperial	38	17	9	12	63	47	+16	43	
10	Horadada	38	16	10	12	66	44	+22	42	
11	Albaterense	38	15	11	12	62	47	+15	41	
12	Beniel	38	16	9	13	53	40	+13	41	
13	Torre Pacheco	38	12	10	16	44	51	−7	34	
14	Naval	38	11	11	16	48	64	−16	33	
15	Mar Menor	38	12	9	17	48	53	−5	33	
16	Bigastro	38	9	10	19	37	49	−12	28	
17	Roldán	38	10	5	23	48	78	−30	25	
18	Águilas	38	4	14	20	38	75	−37	22	
19	Torreagüera	38	7	6	25	21	83	−62	20	Relegation
20	Callosa	38	4	4	30	22	103	−81	12	Relegation

=== Group 14 ===
Pos	Team	Pld	W	D	L	GF	GA	GD	Pts	Promotion or relegation
1	Mérida	40	34	3	3	122	21	+101	71	Promotion to the Segunda División B
2	Extremadura	40	33	3	4	105	17	+88	69	
3	Cacereño	40	29	4	7	89	21	+68	62	
4	Puebla Patria	40	19	10	11	70	45	+25	48	
5	Vasco Núñez	40	19	7	14	77	52	+25	45	
6	Villanovense	40	17	10	13	53	46	+7	44	
7	Villafranca	40	17	10	13	64	48	+16	44	
8	Díter Zafra	40	17	9	14	56	47	+9	43	
9	Moralo	40	19	4	17	70	56	+14	42	
10	La Estrella	40	17	7	16	62	52	+10	41	
11	Montijo	40	14	13	13	70	61	+9	41	
12	Badajoz Pr.	40	16	7	17	73	66	+7	39	
13	Sanvicenteño	40	15	8	17	61	76	−15	38	
14	Orellana	40	16	6	18	51	59	−8	38	
15	Malpartida	40	14	8	18	56	83	−27	36	
16	Pueblonuevo	40	12	10	18	51	67	−16	34	
17	Cabezuela	40	10	6	24	54	104	−50	26	Relegation
18	Coria	40	7	11	22	36	68	−32	25	Relegation
19	Valverdeño	40	8	7	25	44	112	−68	23	Relegation
20	Fuente Cantos	40	7	2	31	33	121	−88	16	Relegation
21	Atalaya	40	4	7	29	24	99	−75	15	Relegation

=== Group 15 ===
Pos	Team	Pld	W	D	L	GF	GA	GD	Pts	Promotion or relegation
1	Mirandés	38	23	9	6	79	23	+56	55	Promotion to the Segunda División B
2	Chantrea	38	20	11	7	68	42	+26	51	
3	Tudelano	38	21	8	9	80	43	+37	50	
4	Peña Sport	38	16	14	8	54	41	+13	46	
5	Oberena	38	17	9	12	65	52	+13	43	
6	Artajonés	38	17	8	13	57	48	+9	42	
7	Ribaforada	38	15	11	12	58	58	0	41	
8	Izarra	38	17	7	14	55	46	+9	41	
9	Haro	38	13	15	10	51	36	+15	41	
10	Logroñés Pr.	38	13	13	12	47	48	−1	39	
11	Burladés	38	15	8	15	40	50	−10	38	
12	Egüés	38	10	13	15	67	63	+4	33	
13	Berceo	38	9	15	14	39	51	−12	33	
14	San Adrián	38	13	7	18	46	53	−7	33	
15	Alfaro	38	11	11	16	38	52	−14	33	
16	San Juan	38	10	13	15	47	62	−15	33	
17	Corellano	38	11	10	17	37	62	−25	32	
18	Urroztarra	38	11	5	22	56	75	−19	27	Relegation
19	Alberite	38	8	10	20	39	80	−41	26	Relegation
20	Iruña	38	6	11	21	35	73	−38	23	Relegation

=== Group 16 ===
Pos	Team	Pld	W	D	L	GF	GA	GD	Pts	Promotion or relegation
1	Barbastro	38	28	6	4	83	36	+47	62	Promotion to the Segunda División B
2	Sariñena	38	21	10	7	76	39	+37	52	
3	Tauste	38	19	8	11	58	34	+24	46	
4	Huesca	38	20	6	12	66	40	+26	46	
5	Ejea	38	17	10	11	59	46	+13	44	
6	Monzón	38	15	14	9	60	38	+22	44	
7	Sabiñánigo	38	16	10	12	54	51	+3	42	
8	Alcañiz	38	16	9	13	64	51	+13	41	
9	Utrillas	38	15	8	15	55	48	+7	38	
10	Calatayud	38	13	12	13	56	59	−3	38	
11	Alcorisa	38	15	7	16	56	69	−13	37	
12	Hernán Cortés	38	11	14	13	48	53	−5	36	
13	Gelsa	38	14	8	16	58	61	−3	36	
14	Tarazona	38	13	10	15	42	52	−10	36	
15	Mallén	38	11	12	15	49	53	−4	34	
16	Caspe	38	12	7	19	50	58	−8	31	
17	Peralta	38	11	8	19	60	81	−21	30	
18	Illueca	38	11	7	20	41	66	−25	29	Relegation
19	Oliver	38	7	6	25	36	72	−36	20	Relegation
20	Jacetano	38	6	6	26	34	98	−64	18	Relegation

=== Group 17 ===
Pos	Team	Pld	W	D	L	GF	GA	GD	Pts	Promotion or relegation
1	Toledo	42	25	12	5	63	30	+33	62	Promotion to the Segunda División B
2	Villarrobledo	42	23	12	7	72	27	+45	58	
3	Alcázar	42	21	13	8	76	45	+31	55	
4	Guadalajara	42	21	10	11	67	47	+20	52	
5	Quintanar	42	19	14	9	71	55	+16	52	
6	La Roda	42	18	14	10	50	40	+10	50	
7	Talavera	42	18	13	11	55	45	+10	49	
8	Daimiel	42	19	10	13	68	39	+29	48	
9	Valdepeñas	42	19	9	14	66	52	+14	47	
10	Fuensalida	42	15	14	13	55	52	+3	44	
11	Azuqueca	42	15	14	13	60	52	+8	44	
12	Conquense	42	14	13	15	60	58	+2	41	
13	Madridejos	42	14	12	16	52	55	−3	40	
14	Villacañas	42	11	18	13	51	61	−10	40	
15	Los Yébenes	42	10	16	16	42	44	−2	36	
16	Campillo	42	10	15	17	51	65	−14	35	
17	Puertollano	42	11	12	19	47	62	−15	34	
18	Yepes	42	11	11	20	44	62	−18	33	Relegation
19	Almansa	42	10	11	21	33	71	−38	31	Relegation
20	Sonseca	42	9	9	24	46	80	−34	27	Relegation
21	Mota Cuervo	42	7	11	24	46	82	−36	25	Relegation
22	Criptanense	42	6	9	27	36	87	−51	19 (Note: Criptanense was docked 2 points.)	Relegation
