= 1990–91 UE Lleida season =

UE Lleida
1990–91 season
- President: Màrius Durán
- Manager: José Manuel Esnal Mané
- Grounds: Camp d'Esports
- Segunda División: 6th
- Copa del Rey: Third Round
- Nostra Catalunya Trophy: 2nd Place
- Ciutat de Lleida Trophy: 2nd Place
- Top goalscorer: League: James Cantero; All: James Cantero

This is a complete list of appearances by members of the professional playing squad of UE Lleida during the 1990–91 season.

	Player	Pos	Lge Apps	Lge Gls	Cup Apps	Cup Gls	Tot Apps	Tot Gls	Date signed	Previous club
Goalkeepers
(Spain)	José Verdejo	GK	37	-	-	-	37	-	1987	Granada
(Spain)	Rafael Arumí	GK	1 (2)	-	2	-	3 (2)	-	1986	Manacor
Defenders
(Algeria)	Ali Benhalima	DF	35	4	1	-	36	4	1990	MC Oran
(Spain)	David Capdevila	DF	2 (2)	-	1	-	3 (2)	-	1985	Academy
(Spain)	Miguel Espejo	DF	19 (5)	-	2	-	21 (5)	-	1989	Real Murcia
(Spain)	Juanjo Lekumberri	DF	2 (4)	-	1	-	3 (4)	-	1982	Osasuna B
(Argentina)	Walter Lozano	DF	24 (2)	-	1	-	25 (2)	-	1990	Valladolid
(Spain)	Sergio Maza	DF	35	-	-	-	35	-	1986	Zaragoza B
Midfielders
(Spain)	Txema Alonso	MF	32 (1)	-	2	-	34 (1)	-	1989	Indautxu
(Spain)	Iñaki Berastegui	MF	11 (8)	2	1	-	12 (8)	2	1990	Osasuna
(Spain)	Pedro Gálvez	MF	34 (3)	5	1 (1)	-	35 (4)	5	1990	Córdoba
(Spain)	Pablo Gómez	MF	32 (4)	-	1	-	33 (4)	-	1989	Aurrerá
(Spain)	Óscar Martínez	MF	1 (1)	-	-	-	1 (1)	-	1990	Academy
(Spain)	Antoni Palau	MF	24 (5)	3	2	-	26 (5)	3	1981	Academy
(Spain)	Sergi Parés	MF	5 (14)	-	1	-	6 (14)	-	1990	Nàstic
(Spain)	Eladio Pérez	MF	15 (11)	-	2	-	17 (11)	-	1990	Osasuna B
(Spain)	Miguel Rubio	MF	38	1	2	1	40	2	1982	Academy
Forwards
(Spain)	Paco Aleñá	CF	31 (4)	6	0 (2)	-	31 (6)	6	1989	Pontevedra
(Spain)	Mariano Azcona	CF	3 (1)	1	-	-	3 (1)	1	1990	Sant Andreu
(Uruguay)	James Cantero	CF	33 (4)	17	1 (1)	-	34 (5)	17	1990	Uruguay de Coronado
(Spain)	Lluís García	CF	1 (3)	-	-	-	1 (3)	-	1988	Mollerussa
(Uruguay)	Adolfo Madrigal	CF	3 (2)	-	1	-	4 (2)	-	1990	Atlético Mineiro
