= List of UE Lleida seasons =

UE Lleida have played more than 70 seasons in Spanish football.

== Key ==
Key to league record:

- P = Played
- W = Games won
- D = Games drawn
- L = Games lost
- F = Goals for
- A = Goals against
- Pts = Points
- Pos = Final position

Key to divisions:

- Liga = La Liga
- SegA = Segunda División
- SegB = Segunda División B
- Terc = Tercera División
- Pref = Regional Preferente
- 1ReA = Primera Regional A
- 1ReB = Primera Regional B
- 2Reg = Segunda Regional
- n/a = Not applicable

Key to rounds:

- DNE = Did not enter
- Disq = Disqualified
- QR = Qualifying round
- Grp = Group stage
- R1 = Round 1
- R2 = Round 2
- R3 = Round 3
- R4 = Round 4
- R5 = Round 5
- QF = Quarter-finals
- SF = Semi-finals
- AQF = Area quarter-finals
- ASF = Area semi-finals
- AF = Area final
- RU = Runners-up
- WS = Shared
- W = Winners

Champions	Runners-up	Promoted	Relegated

Players in bold indicate the top scorer in the division that season.

== Seasons ==
Season	League									Copa del Rey	Copa de la Liga	Other		Top league goalscorer	
Season	Division	P	W	D	L	F	A	Pts	Pos	Copa del Rey	Copa de la Liga	Other		Name	Goals
1939–40	2Reg	12	8	1	3	48	17	17	**1st**	n/a					
1940–41	2Reg	9	6	1	2	39	15	13	**1st**	n/a					
1941–42	1ReB	18	14	2	2	64	27	30	**1st**	n/a					
1942–43	1ReA	18	7	3	8	27	30	17	6th	n/a					
1943–44	Terc	18	3	5	10	20	51	11	9th	R4					
1944–45	Terc	18	5	2	11	28	36	12	9th	n/a		Copa Federación	R1		
1945–46	Terc	18	3	2	13	29	59	8	10th	n/a		Copa Federación	R2		
1946–47	Terc	18	13	1	4	45	23	27	3rd	n/a					
1947–48	Terc	25	11	5	9	45	32	27	4th	R5				Galvany	10
1948–49	Terc	26	16	5	5	57	36	37	**1st**	R2				Julio Remacha	14
1949–50	SegA	30	20	1	9	76	46	41	2nd	R1				Sebastián Fustero	19
1950–51	Liga	30	6	1	23	41	134	13	16th	n/a		Copa Federación	SF	Ignacio Bidegain	8
1951–52	SegA	30	14	4	12	41	52	32	7th	n/a				Moro; Sergio Del Pinto	6
1952–53	SegA	30	14	4	12	48	37	32	6th	R2		Copa Federación	R4	José Estiragués	12
1953–54	SegA	30	16	6	8	62	44	38	3rd	n/a				Félix	13
1954–55	SegA	30	10	7	13	41	56	27	10th	n/a				Manolín	7
1955–56	SegA	30	11	4	15	53	63	26	12th	n/a				Boneu	9
1956–57	SegA	38	8	3	27	37	93	19	20th	n/a				Luis Lax	13
1957–58	Terc	42	26	8	8	102	46	60	2nd	n/a					
1958–59	Terc	34	16	5	13	55	47	37	6th	n/a				Sarret	10
1959–60	Terc	34	15	3	12	67	56	33	6th	n/a				Vilá	15
1960–61	Terc	34	13	4	13	61	56	30	6th	n/a				Oriol	18
1961–62	Terc	30	14	7	9	54	39	35	6th	n/a				Citoler	12
1962–63	Terc	30	17	5	8	78	31	39	4th	n/a				**Trillez**	26
1963–64	Terc	38	25	4	9	82	37	54	2nd	n/a				Nito; Morón	15
1964–65	Terc	38	18	11	9	66	38	47	2nd	n/a				Soroa	17
1965–66	SegA	30	10	10	10	37	31	30	11th	R2				Vallejo	10
1966–67	SegA	30	8	8	14	30	40	24	12th	R2				Juan Cifré	7
1967–68	SegA	30	8	8	14	25	51	24	12th	R1				Antonio Bautista	8
1968–69	Terc	38	19	8	11	54	42	46	5th	n/a				Francisco Fábregas	16
1969–70	Terc	38	17	8	13	53	44	42	10th	R1				Francisco Fábregas	15
1970–71	Pref	38	24	6	8	62	28	54	**1st**	n/a				Josep Maria Mora; Joan Mercadé	15
1971–72	Terc	38	16	13	9	44	29	45	5th	R2				Andrés Escolá	16
1972–73	Terc	38	16	10	12	43	38	42	4th	R2				Juan Tauler	8
1973–74	Terc	38	14	11	13	47	49	39	11th	R1				Manuel Lolín Pérez	13
1974–75	Terc	38	12	11	15	29	48	35	15th	n/a		Nostra Catalunya Trophy	W	Joan Reig	7
1975–76	Terc	38	17	8	13	53	40	42	5th	n/a		Nostra Catalunya Trophy	W	Andrés Escolá	20
1976–77	Terc	38	14	10	14	58	57	38	9th	R3		Nostra Catalunya Trophy	SF	**Juanín**	18
1977–78	SegB	38	13	8	17	39	46	34	16th	R2		Nostra Catalunya Trophy	W	Pepín; Cortés	7
1978–79	SegB	38	13	11	14	56	45	37	11th	R3		Nostra Catalunya Trophy	SF	Ramón Clotet	19
1979–80	SegB	38	16	11	11	40	35	43	6th	R3		Nostra Catalunya Trophy	SF	Llorente	9
1980–81	SegB	38	16	7	15	43	43	39	10th	R2		Nostra Catalunya Trophy	SF	Luis Alonso	21
1981–82	SegB	38	11	13	14	41	53	35	14th	R1		Nostra Catalunya Trophy	W	Ramón Clotet	15
1982–83	SegB	38	15	9	14	46	46	39	10th	n/a	R1	Nostra Catalunya Trophy	SF	Javier Lozano	13
1983–84	SegB	38	16	10	12	53	39	42	8th	R1	SF	Nostra Catalunya Trophy	RU	José García Juárez	10
1984–85	SegB	38	15	12	11	51	45	42	6th	R2	QF	Nostra Catalunya Trophy	SF	José María Serna	17
1985–86	SegB	38	17	12	9	49	25	46	4th	L16		Nostra Catalunya Trophy	RU	Mariano Azcona	9
1986–87	SegB	42	23	11	8	71	32	57	2nd	R2		Nostra Catalunya Trophy	W	Mariano Azcona; Ignacio Alcelay	16
1987–88	SegA	38	15	12	11	53	37	42	6th	R3		Nostra Catalunya Trophy	W	Mariano Azcona	13
1988–89	SegA	38	8	10	20	29	43	26	19th	R4				Mariano Azcona; Álvaro Sánchez Pose	6
1989–90	SegB	38	23	9	6	86	31	55	**1st**	R1		Nostra Catalunya Trophy	RU	**Mariano Azcona**	26
1990–91	SegA	38	16	11	11	41	36	43	6th	R3		Nostra Catalunya Trophy	RU	James Cantero	17
1991–92	SegA	38	17	9	12	52	36	43	5th	R4		Copa Generalitat	RU	Emilio Amavisca	14
1992–93	SegA	38	23	11	4	56	20	57	**1st**	L16				Xabier Gracia	13
1993–94	Liga	38	7	13	18	29	48	27	19th	R5				Nikola Milinković	6
1994–95	SegA	38	19	8	11	54	34	46	3rd	L16				Paco Salillas	18
1995–96	SegA	38	12	12	14	40	49	48	11th	R2				Paco Salillas	10
1996–97	SegA	38	12	12	14	48	41	48	11th	L16				Estefan Julià	8
1997–98	SegA	42	18	9	15	50	46	63	5th	R2				Óscar Arias; Vicente Fernández	8
1998–99	SegA	42	15	14	13	52	50	59	11th	R3		Copa Catalunya	RU	Josemi Pérez	12
1999–00	SegA	42	18	9	15	66	52	63	5th	L16				Josemi Pérez	15
2000–01	SegA	42	5	13	24	40	65	28	22nd	R2				Renaldo Lopes	8
2001–02	SegB	38	16	8	14	56	55	56	9th	R3				Raúl Caballero	11
2002–03	SegB	38	14	12	12	45	44	54	8th	R1				Nano García	15
2003–04	SegB	38	20	8	10	47	36	68	**1st**	n/a				Nakor Bueno	16
2004–05	SegA	42	13	11	18	45	54	50	14th	L16				Nakor Bueno	13
2005–06	SegA	42	12	10	20	43	53	46	19th	R5				Mate Bilić	18
2006–07	SegB	38	12	13	13	44	38	49	14th	R2				Luis Tevenet	14
2007–08	SegB	38	11	15	12	38	44	48	13th	n/a				Keko Martínez; Fernando Esparza; Luismi Gracia	7
2008–09	SegB	38	14	14	10	44	34	56	8th	n/a				Mikel Álvaro	13
2009–10	SegB	38	12	13	13	45	44	49	11th	n/a		Copa Federación	R2	Marc Sellarés	12
2010–11	SegB	38	17	9	12	46	30	60	5th	n/a		Copa Federación	R1	**Rubén Rayos**	18

=== Promotion Leagues ===
Season	League								
Season	Division	P	W	D	L	F	A	Pts	Pos
1941–42	1ReB	26	15	4	7	75	44	34	2nd
1942–43	1ReA	22	8	3	11	43	47	19	8th
1946–47	Terc	14	5	4	5	22	35	14	4th
1949–50	SegA	6	3	0	3	14	15	6	2nd
1953–54	SegA	10	3	2	5	27	30	8	5th
2003–04	SegB	6	3	3	0	7	2	12	**1st**

== Footnotes ==
A.: The Copa de la Liga competition for Segunda División B teams was contested between 1982–83 and 1984–85 seasons.
B.: Lleida lost the promotion against Olot.
C.: Lleida won the promotion against Rapitenca.
D.: Lleida finished second at the promotion League.
E.: Lleida finished eighth at the promotion League.
F.: Lleida wasn't relegated because a change to other Tercera División group.
G.: Lleida finished fourth at the promotion League.
H.: Lleida finished second at the promotion League.
I.: Lleida finished fifth at the promotion League.
J.: Lleida won the promotion first stage against Sant Andreu (5-3) on the aggregate but lost the final stage against Real Unión (7-8) on the aggregate.
K.: Lleida lost the promotion first stage against Plus Ultra (2-3) on the aggregate.
L.: Lleida won the promotion first stage against Alavés (9-2) on the aggregate and the final stage against Calvo Sotelo (5-3) on the aggregate.
M.: Lleida was relegated because a Segunda División change to one group.
