= 1991–92 UE Lleida season =

UE Lleida
1991–92 season
- President: Màrius Durán
- Manager: José Manuel Esnal Mané
- Grounds: Camp d'Esports
- Segunda División: 5th
- Copa del Rey: Fourth Round
- Ciutat de Lleida Trophy: 2nd Place

This is a complete list of appearances by members of the professional playing squad of UE Lleida during the 1991–92 season.

	Player	Pos	Lge Apps	Lge Gls	Cup Apps	Cup Gls	Tot Apps	Tot Gls	Date signed	Previous club
Goalkeepers
(Argentina)	Tubo Fernández	GK	38	5	-	-	38	5	1991	Murcia
(Spain)	Raúl Ojeda	GK	-	-	4	-	4	-	1991	Balaguer
Defenders
(Algeria)	Ali Benhalima	DF	25	2	4	1	29	3	1990	MC Oran
(Spain)	Miguel Espejo	DF	18 (3)	-	2 (1)	-	20 (4)	-	1989	Murcia
(Spain)	Manolo García	DF	16 (2)	-	3	-	19 (2)	-	1991	Salamanca
(Spain)	Juanjo Lekumberri	DF	6 (2)	-	1	-	7 (2)	-	1982	Osasuna B
(Argentina)	Walter Lozano	DF	25 (1)	-	-	-	25 (1)	-	1990	Valladolid
(Spain)	Sergio Maza	DF	27 (1)	2	2	-	29 (1)	2	1986	Zaragoza B
Midfielders
(Spain)	Txema Alonso	MF	36	1	4	-	40	1	1989	Indautxu
(Spain)	José Cancillo	MF	2 (2)	-	-	-	2 (2)	-	1991	Cultural Leonesa
(Spain)	Pablo Gómez	MF	37	4	3 (1)	1	40 (1)	5	1989	Aurrerá
(United States)	Manny Lagos	MF	3 (5)	-	-	-	3 (5)	-	1992	Minnesota Thunder
(Spain)	Jaume Martínez	MF	7 (12)	-	2 (1)	-	9 (13)	-	1991	Balaguer
(Spain)	Antoni Palau	MF	11 (11)	1	3	-	14 (11)	1	1981	Academy
(Spain)	Sergi Parés	MF	22 (10)	1	1 (1)	1	23 (10)	2	1990	Nàstic
(Spain)	Miguel Rubio	MF	38	5	3 (1)	1	41 (1)	6	1982	Academy
Forwards
(Spain)	Paco Aleñá	CF	19 (8)	4	1 (1)	-	20 (9)	4	1989	Pontevedra
(Spain)	Emilio Amavisca	CF	35 (2)	14	0 (2)	1	35 (4)	15	1991	Valladolid
(Spain)	Xavi Bartolo	CF	29 (4)	7	3	2	32 (4)	9	1991	Fraga
(Argentina)	Pedro González	CF	1 (2)	1	4	-	5 (2)	1	1991	Unión de Santa Fe
(Spain)	Carlos Santandreu	CF	8 (9)	1	4	2	12 (9)	3	1991	L'Hospitalet
(Spain)	Domingo Serrano	CF	15 (4)	4	-	-	15 (4)	4	1992	Sevilla
