= 1987–88 UE Lleida season =

UE Lleida
1987–88 season
- President: Màrius Durán
- Manager: Jordi Gonzalvo
- Ground: Camp d'Esports
- Segunda División: 6th
- Copa del Rey: Third Round
- Nostra Catalunya Trophy: Group Stage
- Ciutat de Lleida Trophy: Champion
- Top goalscorer: League: Mariano Azcona; All: Mariano Azcona

This is a complete list of appearances by members of the professional playing squad of UE Lleida during the 1987–88 season.

	Player	Pos	Lge Apps	Lge Gls	Cup Apps	Cup Gls	Tot Apps	Tot Gls	Date signed	Previous club
Goalkeepers
(Spain)	José Verdejo	GK	27	-	1 (1)	-	28 (1)	-	1987	Granada
(Spain)	Rafael Arumí	GK	7	-	3	-	10	-	1986	Manacor
(Spain)	Vicenç Amigó	GK	4	-	-	-	4	-	1982	Sabadell
Defenders
(Spain)	Juanjo Lekumberri	DF	37	1	3	-	40	1	1982	Osasuna B
(Spain)	Jesús Glaría	DF	37	9	4	1	41	10	1985	Logroñés
(Spain)	Juan Carlos Bernad	DF	33	1	3 (1)	-	36 (1)	1	1987	Tenerife
(Spain)	David Capdevila	DF	29 (1)	1	3	-	32 (1)	1	1986	Academy
(Spain)	Roberto Entrialgo	DF	11 (12)	-	2	2	13 (12)	2	1987	Sporting
(Spain)	Marcelino	DF	9 (13)	3	3	1	12 (13)	4	1987	Salamanca
(Spain)	José Manuel Santos	DF	5 (3)	-	2	-	7 (3)	-	1987	Cádiz
(Spain)	Jesús Hernández	DF	1	-	-	-	1	-	1984	Academy
(Spain)	Sergio Maza	DF	0 (3)	-	-	-	0 (3)	-	1986	Zaragoza B
Midfielders
(Spain)	Miguel Rubio	MF	37	1	4	-	41	1	1982	Academy
(Spain)	Antoni Palau	MF	33	2	1 (1)	-	34 (1)	2	1981	Academy
(Spain)	César Luengo	MF	32 (4)	2	1 (2)	-	33 (6)	2	1985	Osasuna
(Spain)	Ramón Planelles	MF	28 (2)	9	4	1	32 (2)	10	1986	Alzira
(Spain)	Emili Vicente	MF	6 (7)	-	1	-	7 (7)	-	1982	Academy
(Spain)	Isidre Tarrés	MF	1	-	-	-	1	-	1986	Murcia
(Spain)	Dioni Domínguez	MF	0 (4)	-	-	-	0 (4)	-	1986	Osasuna
Forwards
(Spain)	Mariano Azcona	CF	38	13	3	1	41	14	1984	Osasuna
(Spain)	Mario Torres	CF	21 (7)	2	2 (1)	-	23 (8)	2	1987	Logroñés
(Socialist Federal Republic of Yugoslavia)	Vanja Milanović	CF	13 (5)	2	2 (1)	1	15 (6)	3	1987	Vojvodina
(Uruguay)	Álvaro Sánchez Pose	CF	8 (2)	5	-	-	8 (2)	5	1987	Nacional
(Spain)	Agustín Lasaosa	CF	1 (8)	-	1 (1)	-	2 (9)	-	1987	Elche
