= 1994–95 UE Lleida season =

UE Lleida
1994–95 season
- Chairman: Màrius Duran
- Manager: Mané
- Segunda División: 3rd
- Top goalscorer: League: Francisco Javier Salillas (18); All: Francisco Javier Salillas (22)

The 1994–95 season was the 56th season in UE Lleida's existence, and their 1st year in Segunda División after relegation, and covered the period from 1 July 1994, to 30 June 1995.

== First-team squad ==
Note: Flags indicate national team as defined under FIFA eligibility rules; some limited exceptions apply. Players may hold more than one non-FIFA nationality.

No.	Pos.	Nation	Player
—	GK	ESP	Emili Isierte
—	GK	ESP	Raúl Ojeda
—	DF	ESP	Gonzalo Arguiñano
—	DF	MKD	Boban Babunski
—	DF	ESP	David de la Hera
—	DF	ESP	Lluís Elcacho
—	DF	ESP	Virgilio Hernández
—	DF	ESP	Matías Rubio
—	DF	RUS	Dmitry Kuznetsov (from January)
—	MF	ESP	Txema Alonso
—	MF	ESP	Vicente Fernández

No.	Pos.	Nation	Player
—	MF	ESP	Antoni Palau
—	MF	ESP	Antonio Roa
—	MF	ESP	Miguel Ángel Rubio
—	FW	ESP	Albert Aguilà
—	FW	ESP	Manuel Baena
—	FW	ESP	Xavi Bartolo
—	FW	BIH	Nikola Milinković
—	FW	FRA	Michel Pineda
—	FW	ESP	Francisco Javier Salillas
—	FW	ESP	Jorge Sola

=== Transfers ===
==== In ====
#	Pos	Player	From	Date
	DF	(North Macedonia) Boban Babunski	(Bulgaria) CSKA Sofia	10 June 1994
	DF	(Spain) Luis Elcacho	(Spain) Oviedo	13 June 1994
	FW	(Spain) Jorge Sola	(Spain) Tudelano	14 June 1994
	FW	(Spain) Francisco Javier Salillas	(Spain) Celta	15 June 1994
	MF	(Spain) Antonio Roa	(Spain) Mérida	21 June 1994
	MF	(Spain) Vicente Fernández	(Spain) Cristinenc	25 July 1994
	GK	(Spain) Emili Isierte	(Spain) Sporting	26 July 1994
	MF	(France) Michel Pineda	(Spain) Racing	25 August 1994
	FW	(Spain) Manuel Baena	(Spain) Sant Andreu	1 September 1994
	DF	(Spain) Matías Rubio	(Spain) Valencia	2 September 1994
	DF	(Russia) Dmitry Kuznetsov	(Spain) Español	2 January 1995

=== Squad stats ===
Updated to games played on 30 June 1994. Only lists players who made an appearance or were on the bench.
Apps = Appearance(s); CS = Clean sheet(s); G = Goal(s); YC = Yellow card(s); L = League; C = Cup.
To see the table ordered by certain column title click that column header icon once or twice.

Goalkeepers

Player	Nat	L Apps	L CS	C Apps	C CS	Total Apps	Total CS
Isierte	ESP	36	0	0	0	36	0
Raúl	ESP	3	0	8	0	11	0

Outfield players

Player	Nat	Pos	L Apps	L G	C Apps	C G	Total Apps	Total G
Rubio	ESP	MF	36	2	6	0	42	2
Txema	ESP	MF	34	4	8	2	42	6
Palau	ESP	MF	37	3	4	2	41	5
Virgilio	ESP	DF	34	2	7	1	41	3
Salillas	ESP	FW	34	18	7	4	41	22
Milinković	BIH	FW	34	6	7	2	41	8
Babunski	MKD	DF	31	1	8	0	39	1
Elcacho	ESP	MF	28	0	6	0	34	0
David	ESP	DF	29	1	4	0	33	1
Roa	ESP	MF	26	1	7	0	33	1
Gonzalo	ESP	DF	26	2	6	0	32	2
Pineda	FRA	FW	23	3	6	1	29	4
Sola	ESP	FW	21	3	4	0	25	3
Bartolo	ESP	FW	21	2	3	0	24	2
Vicente	ESP	MF	15	2	5	0	20	2
Kuznetsov	RUS	DF	14	2	1	0	15	2
Baena	ESP	FW	6	0	2	0	8	0
Matías Rubio	ESP	DF	3	0	3	0	6	0
Aguilà	ESP	FW	3	0	2	0	5	0

== Competitions ==
=== Pre-season ===
Friendlies
Kick Off	Opponents	H / A	Result	Scorers
1994-07-29	(Spain) Mataró	N	7 – 0	Milinković 9', 19', Elcacho 24', Salillas 63', 70', 89', Roa 80'
1994-07-30	(Spain) Girona	A	1 – 0	Milinković 13'
1994-08-03	(Spain) Manlleu	A	1 – 0	Roa 36'
1994-08-04	(Spain) Manresa	A	3 – 0	Salillas 60', 86', Elcacho 89
1994-08-06	(Spain) Nàstic	A	4 – 1	Rubio 15', Salillas 52', 54', Bartolo 73'
1994-08-09	(Spain) Betis	H	2 – 1	Salillas 70' (pen.), 82'
1994-08-12	(Spain) Tàrrega	A	4 – 4	Sola 30', 49', Roa 48', Rubio 83' (pen.)
1994-08-13	(Spain) Barbastro	A	5 – 0	Salillas 50', 73' (pen.), Milinković 57', Parés 83', Bartolo 87'
1994-08-16	(Spain) Balaguer	A	3 – 0	Parés 3', Milinković 32', Salillas 62'
1994-08-20	(Spain) Hércules	N	0 – 0	
1994-08-20	(Spain) Castellón	A	1 – 0	Sola
1994-08-23	(Spain) Oviedo	H	1 – 1	Milinković 80'
1994-08-25	(Spain) Reus	A	6 – 1	Elcacho 26', Sola 37', Palau 41', Salillas 59' (pen.), 75', 79'
1994-08-27	(Spain) Alcampell	A	9 – 0	Salillas 4', 35' (pen.), David 6', 32', Virgilio 18', Palau 43', 45', Sola 57', Milinković 86'
1994-08-30	(Spain) Alavés	A	1 – 0	Milinković 18'

=== Segunda División ===
Kick Off	Opponents	H / A	Result	Scorers	Referee	Pos	Report
1994-09-05 21:00	Badajoz	A	1 – 0	Pineda 66'	Puentes Leira	8th	MR
1994-09-12 19:00	Mallorca	H	1 – 0	Rubio 83'	Martínez Lafuente	2nd	MR
1994-09-19 18:00	Ourense	A	2 – 1	Salillas 4' (pen.), 45'	Carmona Méndez	1st	MR
1994-09-26 18:00	Toledo	H	2 – 0	Sola 65', Rubio 85'	Antoñana Moraza	1st	MR
1994-10-01 16:00	Real Madrid B	A	2 – 0	Salillas 21', 41'	Mejuto González	1st	MR
1994-10-09 17:00	Leganés	H	3 – 0	Pineda 16', Salillas 20', 72'	Tristante Oliva	1st	MR
1994-10-16 17:00	Eibar	A	1 – 3	Txema 36'	Alfonso Álvarez	1st	MR
1994-10-23 17:00	Bilbao Athletic	H	0 – 0		López de la Fuente	1st	MR
1994-10-30 17:00	Extremadura	A	2 – 0	Roa 21', Vicente 60'	Mariano Montesinos	1st	MR
1994-11-06 17:00	Villarreal	H	0 – 1		Mejía Dávila	1st	MR
1994-11-19 18:00	Barcelona B	H	4 – 2	Salillas 16', 34' (pen.), Pirri 48' (o.g.), Virgilio 63'	Iturralde González	1st	MR
1994-11-26 16:30	Marbella	A	0 – 2		Carcelén García	1st	MR
1994-12-03 18:00	Palamós	H	2 – 1	Palau 20', Milinković 60'	Carmona Méndez	1st	MR
1994-12-11 17:00	Salamanca	A	2 – 0	Milinković 15', 63'	Tristante Oliva	1st	MR
1994-12-21 20:30	Rayo Vallecano	H	1 – 1	Babunski 75' (pen.)	Prados Garcia	1st	MR
1995-01-08 11:30	Getafe	A	2 – 2	Pineda 9', Bartolo 87'	Valle Gil	1st	MR
1995-01-15 17:00	Osasuna	H	1 – 2	Sola 79'	Japón Sevilla	1st	MR
1995-01-21 18:30	Hércules	A	0 – 1		López de la Fuente	2nd	MR
1995-01-29 17:00	Mérida	H	0 – 1		Fuentes Leira	4th	MR
1995-02-05 17:00	Badajoz	H	1 – 0	Txema 17'	Mariano Montesinos	3rd	MR
1995-02-11 18:00	Mallorca	A	0 – 0		Mejía Dávila	4th	MR
1995-02-18 18:00	Ourense	H	3 – 0	Sola 38', Palau 42', Txema 77'	Alfonso Álvarez	3rd	MR
1995-02-26 17:00	Toledo	A	1 – 0	Vicente 68'	López de la Fuente	2nd	MR
1995-03-04 18:00	Real Madrid B	H	2 – 0	Salillas 1' (pen.), 83'	Iturralde González	1st	MR
1995-03-12 12:00	Leganés	A	1 – 1	Gonzalo 98'	Miró Pastor	1st	MR
1995-03-18 18:00	Eibar	H	2 – 1	David 20', Salillas 50'	Rivas Fernández	1st	MR
1995-04-01 18:00	Bilbao Athletic	A	2 – 0	Palau 81', Salillas 90'	Torija Arroyo	2nd	MR
1995-04-09 17:00	Extremadura	H	5 – 1	Salillas 6', 18', Txema 15', Milinković 26', Virgilio 83'	Eleicegui Uranga	1st	MR
1995-04-15 18:00	Villarreal	A	0 – 3		Valle Gil	3rd	MR
1995-04-22 16:30	Barcelona B	A	2 – 3	Kuznetsov 44', 69'	Martínez de la Fuente	3rd	MR
1995-04-29 18:00	Marbella	H	1 – 3	Salillas 87'	Carcelén García	3rd	MR
1995-05-06 18:00	Palamós	A	0 – 0		Miró Pastor	3rd	MR
1995-05-13 20:30	Salamanca	H	1 – 1	Gonzalo 87'	Bueno Grimal	3rd	MR
1995-05-21 12:00	Rayo Vallecano	A	0 – 1		Japón Sevilla	3rd	MR
1995-05-28 19:00	Getafe	H	0 – 0		Prados García	3rd	MR
1995-06-04 18:00	Osasuna	A	1 – 0	Salillas 40'	López de la Fuente	3rd	MR
1995-06-11 19:00	Hércules	H	4 – 0	Txema 9', Salillas 32' (pen.), 44', Bartolo 56'	Carmona Méndez	3rd	MR
1995-06-17 21:00	Mérida	A	2 – 3	Milinković 35' (pen.), 38' (pen.)	Mejía Dávila	3rd	MR

=== Play off ===
Kick Off	Opponents	H / A	Result	Scorers	Referee
1995-06-22 21:30	Sporting	H	2 – 2	Salillas 20', Roa 93'	Fernández Marín
1995-06-28 21:30	Sporting	A	2 – 3	David 56', Salillas 85'	López Nieto

=== Copa del Rey ===
Round	Kick Off	Opponents	H / A	Result	Scorers	Referee
R2	1994-10-26 20:30	Manlleu	A	0 – 1		Bueno Grimal
R2	1994-11-09 20:30	Manlleu	H	3 – 1	Txema 8', Salillas 36', Virgilio 89'	Miró Pastor
R3	1995-01-04 21:00	Cartagena	A	0 – 1		Miró Pastor
R3	1995-01-11 20:30	Cartagena	H	5 – 0	Palau 46', 49', Salillas 54', 81', Milinković 83'	Antoñana Moraza
R4	1995-01-25 20:30	Compostela	H	2 – 0	Txema 26', Salillas 87'	Daudén Ibáñez
R4	1995-02-01 20:45	Compostela	A	1 – 1	Milinković 44'	Rodríguez Martel
L16	1995-02-08 21:00	Deportivo	H	0 – 3		Ansuátegui Roca
L16	1995-02-15 21:00	Deportivo	A	1 – 4	Pineda 28'	Brito Arceo

=== Results summary ===
Overall								Home						Away					
Pld	W	D	L	GF	GA	GD	Pts	W	D	L	GF	GA	GD	W	D	L	GF	GA	GD
38	19	8	11	54	34	+20	65	11	4	4	33	14	+19	8	4	7	21	20	+1

Last updated: 2010-09-12.
Source: RFEF
