= 1993–94 UE Lleida season =

UE Lleida
1993–94 season
- Chairman: Màrius Duran
- Manager: Mané
- La Liga: 19th (relegated)
- Top goalscorer: League: Nikola Milinković (6); All: Nikola Milinković (6); Virgilio Hernández (6)

The 1993–94 season was the 55th season in UE Lleida's existence, and their 2nd year in La Liga, and covered the period from 1993-07-01 to 1994-06-30.

== First-team squad ==
Note: Flags indicate national team as defined under FIFA eligibility rules; some limited exceptions apply. Players may hold more than one non-FIFA nationality.

No.	Pos.	Nation	Player
—	GK	ESP	Raúl Ojeda
—	GK	CRO	Mauro Ravnić
—	DF	ESP	Gonzalo Arguiñano
—	DF	ESP	Pedro Luis Cárdenas
—	DF	ESP	David de la Hera
—	DF	ESP	Virgilio Hernández
—	DF	ESP	Sebastià Herrera (from September)
—	DF	ESP	Jaime Quesada
—	DF	ESP	Albert Tomàs
—	MF	ESP	Antonio Acosta (from December)
—	MF	ESP	Txema Alonso

No.	Pos.	Nation	Player
—	MF	URU	Gustavo Matosas (from January)
—	MF	ESP	Urbano Ortega
—	MF	ESP	Antoni Palau
—	MF	ESP	Javi Prieto
—	MF	ESP	Miguel Ángel Rubio
—	FW	ESP	Albert Aguilà
—	FW	DEN	Søren Andersen (from October)
—	FW	ESP	Xavi Bartolo
—	FW	ESP	Javi García
—	FW	ESP	Sergi Parés
—	FW	ESP	Manuel Villa

=== Transfers ===
==== In ====
#	Pos	Player	From	Date
	FW	(Bosnia and Herzegovina) Nikola Milinković	(Federal Republic of Yugoslavia) Bečej	13 July 1993
	MF	(Spain) Manuel Villa	(Spain) Marbella	19 July 1993
	DF	(Spain) Pedro Luis Cárdenas	(Spain) Las Palmas	20 July 1993
	DF	(Spain) Albert Tomàs	(Spain) Barcelona B	23 July 1993
	MF	(Spain) Javier Prieto	(Spain) Jaén	2 August 1993
	FW	(Spain) Albert Aguilà	(Spain) Osasuna	12 August 1993
	MF	(Spain) Urbano Ortega	(Spain) Español	14 August 1993
	FW	(Spain) Javi García	(Spain) Rayo Vallecano	23 August 1993
	DF	(Spain) Sebastià Herrera	(Spain) Barcelona B	20 September 1993
	FW	(Denmark) Søren Andersen	(Denmark) Aarhus	29 October 1993
	MF	(Spain) Antonio Acosta	(Spain) Cádiz	15 December 1993
	MF	(Uruguay) Gustavo Matosas	(Brazil) São Paulo	12 January 1994

=== Squad stats ===
Updated to games played on 30 June 1994. Only lists players who made an appearance or were on the bench.
Apps = Appearance(s); CS = Clean sheet(s); G = Goal(s); YC = Yellow card(s); L = League; C = Cup.
To see the table ordered by certain column title click that column header icon once or twice.

Goalkeepers

Player	Nat	L Apps	L CS	C Apps	C CS	Total Apps	Total CS
Ravnić	CRO	37	9	1	0	38	9
Raúl	ESP	2	0	5	3	7	3

Outfield players

Player	Nat	Pos	L Apps	L G	C Apps	C G	Total Apps	Total G
Rubio	ESP	MF	35	3	5	2	40	5
Urbano	ESP	MF	36	1	3	0	39	1
Txema	ESP	MF	34	1	5	0	39	1
Virgilio	ESP	DF	35	4	3	2	38	6
Jaime	ESP	DF	34	2	4	0	38	2
Gonzalo	ESP	DF	32	1	1	0	33	1
Herrera	ESP	DF	27	1	4	1	31	2
Milinković	BIH	FW	26	6	5	0	31	6
David	ESP	DF	25	0	5	0	30	0
Aguilà	ESP	FW	23	3	6	1	29	4
Tomàs	ESP	DF	22	0	4	0	26	0
Parés	ESP	FW	19	3	6	0	25	3
Andersen	DEN	FW	22	2	0	0	22	2
Javi Prieto	ESP	MF	14	0	5	1	19	1
Pedro Luis	ESP	DF	13	0	5	0	18	0
Matosas	URU	MF	17	2	0	0	17	2
Javi García	ESP	FW	11	0	2	1	13	1
Bartolo	ESP	FW	10	0	2	0	12	0
Acosta	ESP	MF	9	0	0	0	9	0
Palau	ESP	MF	6	0	3	1	9	1
Villa	ESP	FW	2	0	4	1	6	1

== Competitions ==
=== Pre-season ===
Friendlies
Kick Off	Opponents	H / A	Result	Scorers
1993-08-06	(Spain) Osasuna	N	0 – 1	
1993-08-07	(Spain) Zaragoza	N	3 – 0	Quesada 35', De la Hera 43', Parés 73'
1993-08-12	(Spain) Tarazona	A	4 – 0	Bartolo 56, 60', Rubio 67', 89' (pen.)
1993-08-14	(Spain) Izarra	A	1 – 0	Đurđević 17'
1993-08-17	(Spain) Chantrea	A	7 – 1	Milinković (3), Đurđević (2), Alé, Parés
1993-08-19	(Spain) Arenas Ayegui	A	7 – 0	Milinković (2), Urbano (2), Palau, Virgilio, Opponent (o.g.)
1993-08-21	(Spain) Logroñés	N	1 – 0	Parés 2'
1993-08-22	(Spain) Athletic	N	1 – 0	Milinković 76'
1993-08-25	(Spain) Fraga	A	0 – 0	
1993-08-28	(Spain) Reus	A	8 – 0	Milinković 15', De la Hera 41', Bartolo 43', 71', Rubio 45' (pen.), Vila (o.g.) 53', Aguilà, 75', Txema 85'
1993-08-30	(Spain) Premià	N	3 – 0	Quesada 55', Javi 66', Parés 79'
1993-09-08	(Spain) Barbastro	A	0 – 1	

=== La Liga ===
Kick Off	Opponents	H / A	Result	Scorers	Referee	Pos	Report
1993-09-05 17:00	Tenerife	A	0 – 1		Esquinas Torres	12th	MR
1993-09-12 19:00	Athletic	H	1 – 2	Aguilà 17'	Andújar Oliver	19th	MR
1993-09-19 19:00	Rayo Vallecano	H	0 – 1		Rivas Fernández	19th	MR
1993-09-25 21:00	Logroñés	A	1 – 2	Milinković 77'	Fernández Marín	20th	MR
1993-10-03 17:00	Valencia	H	1 – 1	Aguilà 26'	Pajares Paz	19th	MR
1993-10-06 21:00	Celta	A	0 – 1		Rubio Valdivieso	19th	MR
1993-10-17 17:00	Sporting	H	1 – 1	Virgilio 59'	Esquinas Torres	20th	MR
1993-10-24 17:00	Real Madrid	A	0 – 5		Bello Blanco	20th	MR
1993-10-31 17:00	Sevilla	H	0 – 3		Urío Velázquez	20th	MR
1993-11-07 17:00	Real Sociedad	A	3 – 1	Txema 13', Rubio 25' (pen.), Andersen 67'	Rivas Fernández	20th	MR
1993-11-10 21:00	Albacete	H	0 – 1		Merino González	20th	MR
1993-11-20 20:45	FC Barcelona	A	1 – 0	Jaime 86'	Núñez Manrique	20th	MR
1993-11-28 17:00	Zaragoza	H	0 – 1		Martín Navarrete	20th	MR
1993-12-05 17:00	Osasuna	A	0 – 1		Santamaría Uzqueda	20th	MR
1993-12-12 17:00	Valladolid	H	1 – 0	Parés 20'	López Nieto	20th	MR
1993-12-19 17:00	Deportivo	A	0 – 2		Pérez Sánchez	20th	MR
1994-01-02 17:00	Oviedo	H	1 – 1	Rubio 72' (pen.)	Marín López	20th	MR
1994-01-09 17:00	Atlético	A	0 – 0		Rivas Fernández	20th	MR
1994-01-16 17:00	Racing	H	0 – 0		García de Loza	19th	MR
1994-01-23 17:00	Tenerife	H	1 – 1	Gonzalo 85'	Pajares Paz	19th	MR
1994-01-30 17:00	Athletic	A	0 – 4		Núñez Manrique	20th	MR
1994-02-06 17:00	Rayo Vallecano	A	2 – 1	Virgilio 23, Jaime 34'	Rivas Fernández	19th	MR
1994-02-13 17:00	Logroñés	N	1 – 1	Milinković 69'	Gómez López	20th	MR
1994-02-20 17:00	Valencia	A	3 – 3	Milinković 45', Rubio 51' (pen.), Matosas 83'	Esquinas Torres	19th	MR
1994-02-23 20:30	Celta	H	0 – 0		Brito Arceo	19th	MR
1994-02-27 17:00	Sporting	A	1 – 1	Parés 25'	Santamaría Uzqueda	18th	MR
1994-03-06 17:00	Real Madrid	H	2 – 1	Parés 18', Andersen 29'	Rubio Valdivieso	18th	MR
1994-03-13 17:00	Sevilla	A	1 – 2	Virgilio 18'	Urío Velázquez	19th	MR
1994-03-20 17:00	Real Sociedad	H	1 – 0	Milinković 86'	Bello Blanco	18th	MR
1994-03-27 17:00	Albacete	A	1 – 2	Virgilio 49'	García de Loza	19th	MR
1994-04-02 20:30	FC Barcelona	H	1 – 2	Urbano 6'	Ansuategui Roca	19th	MR
1994-04-06 21:00	Zaragoza	A	1 – 1	Milinković 48'	Díaz Vega	18th	MR
1994-04-10 17:00	Osasuna	H	1 – 2	Matosas 3'	García Aranda	19th	MR
1994-04-17 17:00	Valladolid	A	2 – 0	Aguilà 35', Milinković 91'	Gracia Redondo	18th	MR
1994-04-23 20:30	Deportivo	H	0 – 0		Fernández Marín	19th	MR
1994-05-01 19:00	Oviedo	A	0 – 0		López Nieto	19th	MR
1994-05-08 19:00	Atlético	H	0 – 1		Díaz Vega	19th	MR
1994-05-15 19:00	Racing	A	1 – 2	Herrera 44'	Brito Arceo	19th	MR

=== Copa del Rey ===
Round	Kick Off	Opponents	H / A	Result	Scorers	Referee
R3	1993-09-02 19:00	Escobedo	A	0 – 0		Santamaría Uzqueda
R3	1993-09-15 20:30	Escobedo	H	3 – 0	Javi García 36', Javi Prieto 70', Villa 87'	Gracia Redondo
R4	1993-10-10 17:00	Compostela	A	2 – 1	Virgilio 2', Aguilà 84'	Marín López
R4	1993-11-02 20:30	Compostela	H	4 – 1	Herrera 2', Palau 45', Rubio 48', 85' (pen.)	Brito Arceo
R5	1993-12-01 20:45	Logroñés	A	1 – 3	Virgilio 88'	Díaz Vega
R5	1993-12-15 20:30	Logroñés	H	0 – 0		Gracia Redondo

=== Results summary ===
Overall								Home						Away					
Pld	W	D	L	GF	GA	GD	Pts	W	D	L	GF	GA	GD	W	D	L	GF	GA	GD
38	7	13	18	29	48	−19	34	3	8	8	12	19	−7	4	5	10	17	29	−12

Last updated: 2010-05-09.
Source: RFEF
