= 1989–90 UE Lleida season =

UE Lleida
1989–90 season
- President: Màrius Durán
- Manager: José Manuel Esnal Mané
- Grounds: Camp d'Esports
- Segunda División B: Group 2 - Champion
- Copa del Rey: First Round
- Nostra Catalunya Trophy: 2nd Place

This is a complete list of appearances by members of the professional playing squad of UE Lleida during the 1989–90 season.

	Player	Pos	Lge Apps	Lge Gls	Cup Apps	Cup Gls	Tot Apps	Tot Gls	Date signed	Previous club
Goalkeepers
(Spain)	Rafael Arumí	GK	20	-	2	-	22	-	1986	Manacor
(Spain)	José Verdejo	GK	18	-	-	-	18	-	1987	Granada
Defenders
(Spain)	David Capdevila	DF	27 (1)	6	1	-	28 (1)	6	1986	Academy
(Spain)	Miguel Espejo	DF	31	1	2	-	33	1	1989	Murcia
(Spain)	Jesús Hernández	DF	10 (3)	1	2	-	12 (3)	1	1984	Academy
(Spain)	Juanjo Lekumberri	DF	17 (6)	-	1	-	18 (6)	-	1982	Osasuna B
(Spain)	Sergio Maza	DF	33	-	-	-	33	-	1986	Zaragoza B
(Spain)	Miguel Rubio	DF	36	5	2	-	38	5	1982	Academy
Midfielders
(Spain)	Txema Alonso	MF	32	6	1	-	33	6	1989	Indautxu
(Spain)	Xabier Bontigui	MF	6 (16)	4	0 (2)	-	6 (18)	4	1989	Real Sociedad B
(Spain)	Iñaki Eguileor	MF	28 (5)	4	2	-	30 (5)	4	1989	Villarreal
(Spain)	Pedro Gálvez	MF	26 (11)	6	1 (1)	-	27 (12)	6	1989	Córdoba
(Spain)	Pablo Gómez	MF	26 (4)	2	2	-	28 (4)	2	1989	Aurrerá
(Spain)	Jaume Martínez	MF	3 (2)	1	1	-	4 (2)	1	1989	Academy
(Spain)	Óscar Martínez	MF	4 (7)	-	-	-	4 (7)	-	1989	Academy
(Spain)	Antoni Palau	MF	31 (2)	6	1 (1)	-	32 (3)	6	1981	Academy
Forwards
(Spain)	Paco Aleñá	CF	35	14	2	1	37	15	1989	Pontevedra
(Spain)	Mariano Azcona	CF	33 (3)	26	2	-	35 (3)	26	1984	Osasuna
(Spain)	Xavi Bartolo	CF	0 (2)	-	-	-	0 (2)	-	1989	Academy
(Spain)	Lluís García	CF	2 (11)	-	-	-	2 (11)	-	1988	Mollerussa
