= 1992–93 UE Lleida season =

UE Lleida
1992–93 season
- Chairman: Màrius Duran
- Manager: Mané
- Segunda División: 1st (promoted)
- Top goalscorer: League: Xabier Gracia (13); All: Xabier Gracia (13)

The 1992–93 season was the 54th season in UE Lleida's existence, and their 3rd consecutive year in Segunda División, and covered the period from 1992-07-01 to 1993-06-30.

== First-team squad ==
Note: Flags indicate national team as defined under FIFA eligibility rules; some limited exceptions apply. Players may hold more than one non-FIFA nationality.

No.	Pos.	Nation	Player
—	GK	ESP	Raúl Ojeda
—	GK	CRO	Mauro Ravnić
—	DF	ESP	Gonzalo Arguiñano
—	DF	ALG	Ali Benhalima
—	DF	ESP	David de la Hera
—	DF	ESP	José Luis Gallardo (from November)
—	DF	ESP	Virgilio Hernández
—	DF	ESP	Sergio Maza
—	DF	ESP	Jaime Quesada
—	MF	ARG	Gustavo Acosta (from March)

No.	Pos.	Nation	Player
—	MF	ESP	Txema Alonso
—	MF	ESP	David Franqué
—	MF	ESP	Jordi Grabulosa
—	MF	ESP	Xabier Gracia
—	MF	ESP	Jaume Martínez
—	MF	ESP	Antoni Palau
—	MF	ESP	Miguel Ángel Rubio
—	FW	ESP	Xavi Bartolo
—	FW	ESP	Sergi Parés
—	FW	ESP	José Francisco Sigüenza

=== Transfers ===
==== In ====
#	Pos	Player	From	Date
	MF	(Spain) Xabier Gracia	(Spain) Bilbao Athletic	22 June 1992
	DF	(Spain) David de la Hera	(Spain) Benidorm	25 June 1992
	MF	(Spain) Jordi Grabulosa	(Spain) Figueres	25 June 1992
	DF	(Spain) Jaime Quesada	(Spain) L'Hospitalet	25 June 1992
	FW	(Spain) Ignacio Bernal	(Spain) Levante	30 June 1992
	GK	(Croatia) Mauro Ravnić	(Spain) Valladolid	3 July 1992
	DF	(Spain) Virgilio Hernández	(Spain) Palamós	14 July 1992
	DF	(Spain) Gonzalo Arguiñano	(Spain) Burgos	16 July 1992
	FW	(Spain) José Sigüenza	(Spain) Cartagena	16 July 1992
	MF	(Spain) David Franqué	(Spain) Barcelona	25 August 1992
	DF	(Spain) José Luis Gallardo	(Spain) Español	11 November 1992
	MF	(Argentina) Gustavo Acosta	(Germany) Lurup	23 March 1993

=== Squad stats ===
Updated to games played on 30 June 1994. Only lists players who made an appearance or were on the bench.
Apps = Appearance(s); CS = Clean sheet(s); G = Goal(s); YC = Yellow card(s); L = League; C = Cup.
To see the table ordered by certain column title click that column header icon once or twice.

Goalkeepers

Player	Nat	L Apps	L CS	C Apps	C CS	Total Apps	Total CS
Ravnić	CRO	38	0	0	0	38	0
Raúl	ESP	2	0	5	3	7	3

Outfield players

Player	Nat	Pos	L Apps	L G	C Apps	C G	Total Apps	Total G
Virgilio	ESP	DF	38	5	5	0	43	5
Sigüenza	ESP	FW	38	11	4	0	42	11
Gonzalo	ESP	DF	36	0	6	0	42	0
Gracia	ESP	MF	38	13	3	0	41	13
Txema	ESP	MF	35	3	6	0	41	3
Rubio	ESP	MF	34	7	6	0	40	7
Jaime	ESP	DF	34	0	6	0	40	0
David	ESP	DF	34	2	4	0	38	2
Bartolo	ESP	FW	29	8	5	2	34	10
Palau	ESP	MF	29	1	4	0	33	1
Bernal	ESP	MF	26	2	4	0	30	2
Benhalima	ALG	DF	18	0	3	0	21	0
Gallardo	ESP	DF	15	0	4	0	19	0
Parés	ESP	FW	18	2	0	0	18	2
Franqué	ESP	MF	10	0	3	1	13	1
Maza	ESP	DF	9	0	2	0	11	0
Acosta	ARG	MF	9	0	0	0	9	0
Grabulosa	ESP	MF	5	0	3	0	8	0
Jaume Martínez	ESP	MF	2	0	1	0	3	0

== Competitions ==
=== Pre-season ===
Friendlies
Kick Off	Opponents	H / A	Result	Scorers
1992-08-03	(Spain) Sant Guim	N	8 – 0	Ramdae (4), Bartolo, Virgilio, Parés, Jaume
1992-08-07	(France) Pau	N	0 – 1	
1992-08-09	(France) Saint-Gaudens	N	4 – 1	Palau (2), Sigüenza, Gracia
1992-08-14	(Spain) Val d'Aran XI	A	9 – 0	Sigüenza (2), Bernal (2), Bartolo, Parés, Jaume, Óscar, Palau
1992-08-18	(Spain) Balaguer	N	2 – 1	Gracia 76', Cancillo 86'
1992-08-21	(Spain) Tamarite	A	8 – 0	Gracia (3), Virgilio (pen.), De la Hera, Palau, Parés, Bartolo
1992-08-22	(Spain) Alpicat	A	14 – 0	Bernal (3), Parés (2), Jaume (2), Sigüenza (2), Bartolo, Virgilio, Óscar, Rubio, Grabulosa
1992-08-25	(Spain) Reus	A	4 – 1	Virgilio 16' (pen.), Gracia 20', Óscar 55', Franqué 80' (pen.)
1992-08-27	(Brazil) Atlético Mineiro	H	2 – 1	Palau 9', Gonzalo 17'
1992-08-29	(Spain) Huesca	A	3 – 1	Bartolo 14', Palau 17', Corbinos (o.g.) 78'

=== Segunda División ===
Kick Off	Opponents	H / A	Result	Scorers	Referee	Pos	Report
1992-09-06 19:00	Mallorca	H	2 – 2	De la Hera 10', Gracia 39'	Bueno Grimal	7th	MR
1992-09-13 19:00	Lugo	A	0 – 0		Sánchez Regidor	9th	MR
1992-09-20 19:00	Bilbao Athletic	H	1 – 0	Txema 92'	Barrenechea Montero	7th	MR
1992-09-26 21:00	Valladolid	A	1 – 0	Gracia 63'	Beguiristain Iceta	4th	MR
1992-10-04 17:00	Palamós	H	3 – 0	Bartolo 15', 42', Gracia 21'	Hernández Velázquez	2nd	MR
1992-10-10 20:00	Barcelona B	A	1 – 1	Sigüenza 7'	Alemán Martín	3rd	MR
1992-10-18 17:00	Villarreal	H	1 – 0	De la Hera 76'	Andradas Asurmendi	2nd	MR
1992-10-25 17:00	Mérida	A	2 – 0	Txema 55', Grabulosa 85'	Japón Sevilla	1st	MR
1992-10-31 16:00	Real Madrid B	A	1 – 0	Rubio 90'	Nevado González	1st	MR
1992-11-08 17:00	Eibar	H	3 – 1	Gracia 7', Virgilio 13', Oyarbide (o.g.) 74'	Daudén Ibáñez	1st	MR
1992-11-22 17:00	Betis	A	0 – 0		Carmona Méndez	1st	MR
1992-11-29 17:00	Racing	H	3 – 0	Sigüenza 45', Bartolo 54', Rubio 88'	Yuste González	1st	MR
1992-12-06 17:00	Marbella	A	1 – 1	Gracia 51'	Hernández Pérez	1st	MR
1992-12-13 17:00	Figueres	H	1 – 1	Gracia 64'	Contador Crespo	1st	MR
1992-12-19 18:45	Sabadell	A	0 – 2		Quiralte Simón	1st	MR
1993-01-02 18:15	Castellón	H	2 – 1	Bartolo 16', 63'	Esteban Díaz	1st	MR
1993-01-10 17:00	Badajoz	A	2 – 1	Bartolo 1', Gonzalo 82'	Panadero Martínez	1st	MR
1993-01-17 17:00	Compostela	H	1 – 0	Virgilio 36'	Beguiristain Iceta	1st	MR
1993-01-24 17:00	Sestao	A	2 – 2	Bartolo 17', Rubio 59' (pen.)	García Prieto	2nd	MR
1993-01-30 18:00	Mallorca	A	2 – 0	Rubio 6' (pen.), Sigüenza 79'	Navarrete Reyes	1st	MR
1993-02-06 18:15	Lugo	H	4 – 0	Gracia 5', 60', 82', Virgilio 74' (pen.)	Nevado González	1st	MR
1993-02-14 17:00	Bilbao Athletic	A	0 – 0		Yuste González	1st	MR
1993-02-21 17:00	Valladolid	H	1 – 2	Virgilio 65'	Miró Pastor	1st	MR
1993-02-27 18:15	Palamós	A	0 – 0		Quiralte Simón	1st	MR
1993-03-06 18:15	Barcelona B	H	1 – 0	Parés 34'	Hernández Velázquez	1st	MR
1993-03-13 17:30	Villarreal	A	4 – 2	Gracia 30', Bernal 41', Rubio 54' (pen.), Sigüenza 85'	Caetano Bueno	1st	MR
1993-03-21 17:00	Mérida	H	1 – 1	Rubio 35' (pen.)	Pérez Gallego	1st	MR
1993-04-04 17:00	Real Madrid B	H	0 – 2		Andradas Asurmendi	1st	MR
1993-04-11 17:00	Eibar	A	0 – 1		Contador Crespo	2nd	MR
1993-04-18 17:00	Betis	H	1 – 0	Bartolo 48'	Beguiristain Iceta	2nd	MR
1993-05-01 18:00	Racing	A	2 – 0	Sigüenza 68', Bernal 94'	Sánchez Calvo	1st	MR
1993-05-09 19:00	Marbella	H	1 – 0	Gracia 8'	Bueno Grimal	1st	MR
1993-05-15 18:15	Figueres	A	0 – 0		Japón Sevilla	1st	MR
1993-05-22 18:15	Sabadell	H	3 – 0	Txema 20', Rubio 55', Virgilio 84'	Panadero Martínez	1st	MR
1993-05-29 18:00	Castellón	A	2 – 0	Parés 70', Bernal 77'	Caetano Bueno	1st	MR
1993-06-05 18:00	Badajoz	H	3 – 0	Sigüenza 9', 54', Gracia 47'	Martínez de la Fuente	1st	MR
1993-06-12 18:00	Compostela	A	3 – 0	Sigüenza 43', 52', 75' (pen.)	Nevado González	1st	MR
1993-06-19 19:00	Sestao	H	1 – 0	Palau 36'	Bueno Grimal	1st	MR

=== Copa del Rey ===
Round	Kick Off	Opponents	H / A	Result	Scorers	Referee
R3	1992-10-01 21:15	Hércules	A	1 – 1	Bartolo 46'	Panadero Martínez
R3	1992-11-05 20:30	Hércules	H	1 – 0	Bartolo 8'	García Prieto
R5	1993-01-13 20:30	Palamós	H	0 – 0		Daudén Ibáñez
R5	1993-01-20 20:30	Palamós	A	1 – 1	Franqué 27' (pen.)	Velázquez Carrillo
L16	1993-02-03 20:30	Real Sociedad	H	0 – 0		García Aranda
L16	1993-02-17 20:30	Real Sociedad	A	0 – 3		López Nieto

=== Results summary ===
Overall								Home						Away					
Pld	W	D	L	GF	GA	GD	Pts	W	D	L	GF	GA	GD	W	D	L	GF	GA	GD
38	23	11	4	56	20	+36	80	14	3	2	33	10	+23	9	8	2	23	10	+13

Last updated: 2010-09-12.
Source: RFEF
