= 1988–89 UE Lleida season =

UE Lleida
1988–89 season
- President: Màrius Durán
- Manager: José Manuel Esnal Mané
- Grounds: Camp d'Esports
- Segunda División: 19th
- Copa del Rey: Round of 32
- Nostra Catalunya Trophy: Group Stage
- Top goalscorer: League: Mariano Azcona (6); Álvaro Sánchez Pose (6); All: Álvaro Sánchez Pose (9)

This is a complete list of appearances by members of the professional playing squad of UE Lleida during the 1988–89 season.

	Player	Pos	Lge Apps	Lge Gls	Cup Apps	Cup Gls	Tot Apps	Tot Gls	Date signed	Previous club
Goalkeepers
(Spain)	Rafael Arumí	GK	13 (1)	-	4	-	17 (1)	-	1986	Manacor
(Spain)	Moncho González	GK	1	-	-	-	1	-	1988	Nàstic
(Spain)	José Verdejo	GK	24	-	4	-	28	-	1987	Granada
Defenders
(Spain)	Juan Carlos Bernad	DF	14 (1)	-	3 (1)	-	17 (1)	-	1988	Tenerife
(Spain)	David Capdevila	DF	16 (1)	-	5	-	21 (1)	-	1986	Academy
(Spain)	Jesús Hernández	DF	13 (1)	-	2	-	15 (1)	-	1984	Academy
(Spain)	Juanjo Lekumberri	DF	34 (2)	-	8	-	42 (2)	-	1982	Osasuna B
(Spain)	Sergio Maza	DF	21	-	2	-	23	-	1986	Zaragoza B
(Spain)	Miguel Rubio	DF	37	-	8	-	45	-	1982	Academy
(Spain)	José Manuel Santos	DF	24	1	5	-	29	1	1987	Cádiz
Midfielders
(Spain)	Emilio Gregory	MF	11 (5)	2	2 (2)	-	13 (7)	2	1988	Burgos
(Spain)	José Manuel Lacalle	MF	3	-	2 (1)	-	5 (1)	-	1988	Elche
(Spain)	César Luengo	MF	36 (1)	3	8	-	44 (1)	3	1985	Osasuna
(Spain)	Jaume Martínez	MF	11 (4)	1	-	-	11 (4)	1	1988	Academy
(Spain)	Óscar Martínez	MF	3	1	-	-	3	1	1988	Academy
(Spain)	Antoni Palau	MF	30 (3)	3	7	2	37 (3)	5	1981	Academy
(Spain)	Jabo Sa	CF	22 (6)	1	2 (3)	-	24 (9)	1	1988	Bilbao Athletic
(Spain)	Pascual Sanz	MF	33 (1)	3	6 (1)	1	39 (2)	4	1988	Zaragoza
(Spain)	Emili Vicente	MF	4 (9)	-	2	2	6 (9)	2	1982	Academy
Forwards
(Spain)	Mariano Azcona	CF	26	6	7	1	33	7	1984	Osasuna
(Spain)	Lluís García	CF	8 (7)	2	1 (2)	1	9 (9)	3	1988	Mollerussa
(Uruguay)	Álvaro Sánchez Pose	CF	11 (6)	6	3 (1)	3	14 (9)	9	1988	Nacional
(Spain)	Luis Sukia	CF	13 (4)	-	-	-	13 (4)	-	1988	Real Sociedad
(Spain)	Jesús Tejero	CF	9 (19)	-	4 (3)	1	11 (22)	2	1988	Zaragoza B
