= 1995–96 FC Barcelona season =

97th season in existence of FC Barcelona

FC Barcelona
1995–96 season
- President: Josep Lluís Núñez
- Head Coach: Johan Cruyff (until 15 May 1996); Carles Rexach
- Stadium: Camp Nou
- La Liga: 3rd
- Copa del Rey: Runners-up
- UEFA Cup: Semi-finals
- Joan Gamper Trophy: Winner
- Top goalscorer: League: Óscar García (10); All: Meho Kodro (15)
Home colours	Away colours

The 1995–96 season was the 97th season in existence of F.C Barcelona and their 67th consecutive season in the top flight of Spanish football, La Liga. Barcelona again failed to follow up on their 1993-94 league title, instead finishing third in the league. In April, the team lost the chance at three trophies in 10 days. First, Barcelona reached the finals of the Copa del Rey, losing 1-0 to Atlético Madrid. They then stumbled in the UEFA Cup as they were knocked out by Bayern Munich in a 1-2 (3-4 on aggregate) loss at home, before losing definitively to Atlético Madrid at home, erasing the chance of a league win.

Barcelona were active in the transfer market, bringing in players such as Georghe Popescu, Ángel Cuéllar, Meho Kodro, Robert Prosinečki, and Luís Figo. Hristo Stoichkov and Ronald Koeman were two notable departures.

The season was head coach Johan Cruyff's final with the club, as he was sacked after the May losses. Carles Rexach served as manager until Englishman Bobby Robson was hired.

== Summary ==
The season is best remembered as the end of Johan Cruyff's era as Head coach after almost eight years. During the summer the club made the transfers in of Gheorghe Popescu from Tottenham Hotspur, striker Ángel Cuéllar from Real Betis, forward Meho Kodro from Real Sociedad, Robert Prosinečki from Real Oviedo and the controversial move of Luís Figo from Sporting Lisboa (a petition of Jorge Valdano to the Real Madrid) after a two years ban of Italian Federation due to a double accord of the Portuguese midfielder with both Parma and Juventus.

Cruyff took Hristo Stoichkov and Ronald Koeman out of the team with controversy for fans and President included. In this campaign, the plan of head coach was mix arrivals and a new generation known as "La Quinta de Lo Pelat" (The generation of Lo Pelat) young players such as Iván de la Peña nicked as Pelat, Oscar García, Roger García, Toni Velamazan and Albert Celades.

The team reached its climax on 7 October 1995 defeating Real Betis 5–1 in Sevilla with La Quinta de Lo Pelat. The club were struggling in League against leader of table, Atlético Madrid, while competing in the 1995–96 Copa del Rey, where the squad reached the 1996 Copa del Rey Final and the 1995–96 UEFA Cup Semi-finals.

However, the squad lost in ten days the three trophies, first on 10 April 1996 FC Barcelona was defeated 0-1 by Atlético Madrid in the Copa del Rey Final. Six days later, in Barcelona the squad lost the semifinal 1–2 against Bayern München and was eliminated from the UEFA Cup tournament. The bizarre series of results ended on 20 April 1996 when Atlético Madrid won 3–1 at Camp Nou means that FC Barcelona could not win La Liga for second consecutive year.

The shocking 10 days of losses shattered Johan Cruyff as manager and President Jose Luis Nuñez started contacts with English trainer Bobby Robson during May to replace Cruyff for 1996–97 season. Finally, Nuñez fired Cruyff on 19 May 1996 and signed Robson as the new head coach.

== Squad ==
Note: Flags indicate national team as defined under FIFA eligibility rules; some limited exceptions apply. Players may hold more than one non-FIFA nationality.

No.	Pos.	Nation	Player
1	GK	ESP	Carles Busquets
2	DF	ESP	Albert Ferrer
3	DF	ESP	Abelardo Fernández
4	MF	ESP	Josep Guardiola (vice-captain)
5	MF	ROU	Gheorghe Popescu
6	MF	ESP	José Mari Bakero (captain)
7	MF	POR	Luís Figo
8	MF	ESP	Guillermo Amor (vice-captain)
9	FW	BIH	Meho Kodro
11	MF	ROU	Gheorghe Hagi
12	DF	ESP	Sergi Barjuán
13	GK	ESP	Jesús Angoy

No.	Pos.	Nation	Player
14	FW	NED	Jordi Cruyff
16	MF	ESP	Óscar García
20	DF	ESP	Miguel Ángel Nadal
21	MF	CRO	Robert Prosinečki
22	GK	ESP	Julen Lopetegui
23	MF	ESP	Iván de la Peña
24	MF	ESP	Roger García
25	DF	ESP	Quique Álvarez
26	MF	ESP	Albert Celades
28	MF	ESP	Toni Velamazán
30	MF	ESP	Francisco Rufete

=== Transfers ===
In
Pos.	Name	from	Type
MF	Luís Figo	Sporting Lisboa	
MF	Gheorghe Popescu	Tottenham Hotspur	
MF	Robert Prosinečki	Real Oviedo	
FW	Meho Kodro	Real Sociedad	
FW	Ángel Cuéllar	Real Betis	
MF	Óscar García	Albacete	Loan ended
DF	Lluís Carreras	Racing Santander	Loan ended
MF	Goran Vučević	Hajduk Split	Loan ended
DF	Álex García	Palamós	Loan ended

Out
Pos.	Name	To	Type
DF	Ronald Koeman	Feyenoord	
FW	Romário	CR Flamengo	
FW	Hristo Stoichkov	Parma	
FW	Txiki Begiristain	Deportivo	
MF	Eusebio	Celta de Vigo	
MF	Igor Korneev	Heerenveen	
DF	Iván Iglesias	Sporting Gijón	
DF	Xabier Eskurza	Valencia	
DF	Xavier Escaich	Albacete	
DF	José Mari García	Real Betis	
MF	Óscar Arpón	Real Betis	
MF	Sánchez Jara	Real Betis	
MF	Álex García	Cádiz	
DF	Goran Vučević	Mérida	Loan

== Competitions ==
=== La Liga ===
==== League table ====
Pos	Team	Pld	W	D	L	GF	GA	GD	Pts	Qualification or relegation
1	Atlético Madrid (C)	42	26	9	7	75	32	+43	87	Qualification for the Champions League group stage
2	Valencia	42	26	5	11	77	51	+26	83	Qualification for the UEFA Cup first round
3	Barcelona	42	22	14	6	72	39	+33	80	Qualification for the Cup Winners' Cup first round (Note: Since Atlético Madrid, winners of 1995–96 Copa del Rey, was qualified for the 1996–97 UEFA Champions League, losing cup finalists Barcelona earned a spot in the first round of the 1996–97 UEFA Cup Winners' Cup.)
4	Espanyol	42	20	14	8	63	36	+27	74	Qualification for the UEFA Cup first round
5	Tenerife	42	20	12	10	69	54	+15	72	Qualification for the UEFA Cup first round

Source: LFP
Rules for classification: 1) points; 2) head-to-head points; 3) head-to-head goal difference; 4) head-to-head goals scored; 5) goal difference; 6) number of goals scored.
(C) Champions

==== Results by round ====
Round	1	2	3	4	5	6	7	8	9	10	11	12	13	14	15	16	17	18	19	20	21	22	23	24	25	26	27	28	29	30	31	32	33	34	35	36	37	38	39	40	41	42
Ground	A	H	A	H	A	H	A	H	H	A	H	A	H	A	H	A	H	A	H	A	H	H	A	H	A	H	A	H	A	A	H	A	H	A	H	A	H	A	H	A	H	A
Result	W	D	W	W	D	W	W	W	W	L	W	D	W	D	D	L	W	L	W	L	D	W	D	W	D	W	W	W	D	L	W	W	D	W	W	D	L	W	D	D	W	D
Position	7	5	3	3	3	3	2	2	2	2	2	2	1	2	2	3	3	3	2	4	4	3	3	2	2	2	2	2	2	2	2	2	2	3	2	2	2	2	3	3	3	3

Source: Competitive matches
A = Away; H = Home; W = Win; D = Draw; L = Loss; = Leader, 1996–97 UEFA Champions League Group stage; = 1996–97 UEFA Cup First round; R = 1996–97 UEFA Cup Winners' Cup

Note: UEFA Cup Winners' Cup spot (in green) being non-related with a position in La Liga, does not appear until the winner is assured to not win La Liga, thus if wins La Liga has a spot in the UEFA Champions League, then 1995–96 Copa del Rey runners-up earns a spot in the 1996–97 UEFA Cup Winners' Cup. Atlético Madrid won their 9th La Liga title in the last matchday, so after matchday 39 Barcelona's places are coloured in green. In light green the spot expected for 1996–97 UEFA Cup Winners' Cup.

==== Matches ====
3 September 1995 1	Real Valladolid	0–2	FC Barcelona	Valladolid
			Popescu 68' de la Peña 89'	Stadium: José Zorrilla

9 September 1995 2	FC Barcelona	2–2	CP Mérida	Barcelona
	Kodro 25' 89' (pen.)		Reyes 1' (pen.); Correa 64'	Stadium: Camp Nou

17 September 1995 3	Real Zaragoza	0–3	FC Barcelona	Zaragoza
			Cruyff 51'; Kodro 70'; Luís Figo 73'	Stadium: La Romareda

23 September 1995 4	FC Barcelona	2–0	Rayo Vallecano	Barcelona
	Nadal 34'; Luís Figo 89'			Stadium: Camp Nou

30 September 1995 5	Real Madrid	1–1	FC Barcelona	Madrid
	Raúl 12'		Roger 31'	Stadium: Santiago Bernabéu

4 October 1995 6	FC Barcelona	4–1	Real Oviedo	Barcelona
	Bakero 15' 31' 36'; Hagi 88'		Oli 59'	Stadium: Camp Nou

7 October 1995 7	Real Betis	1–5	FC Barcelona	Seville
	Pier 46'		Roger 7'; Luís Figo 26'; Celades 81'; Velamazán 83' de la Peña 84'	Stadium: Benito Villamarín

14 October 1995 8	FC Barcelona	4–1	Athletic de Bilbao	Barcelona
	Velamazán 9' de la Peña 64'; Óscar 79'; Tabuenca 86' (o.g.)		García 53'	Stadium: Camp Nou

22 October 1995 9	FC Barcelona	1–0	Valencia CF	Barcelona
	Prosinečki 83' (pen.)			Stadium: Camp Nou

28 October 1995 10	Compostela	2–1	FC Barcelona	Santiago de Compostela
	Christensen 76' (pen.); Ohen 78'		Kodro 24'	Stadium: San Lázaro

5 November 1995 11	FC Barcelona	4–1	UD Salamanca	Barcelona
	Popescu 11' 30' (pen.); Kodro 22'; Óscar 48'		Stîngă 85'	Stadium: Camp Nou

12 November 1995 12	CD Tenerife	1–1	FC Barcelona	Santa Cruz de Tenerife
	Llorente 48'		Roger 36'	Stadium: Heliodoro Rodríguez López

18 November 1995 13	FC Barcelona	3-0	Albacete	Barcelona
	Hagi 14'; Popescu 62'; Prosinečki 85'			Stadium: Camp Nou

25 November 1995 14	Real Sociedad	1–1	FC Barcelona	San Sebastián
	Idiakez 82'		Óscar 44'	Stadium: Anoeta

2 December 1995 15	FC Barcelona	1–1	Racing de Santander	Barcelona
	Kodro 20'		Txema 42'	Stadium: Camp Nou

9 December 1995 16	Atlético de Madrid	3–1	FC Barcelona	Madrid
	Penev 3' (pen.) 12'; Caminero 81'		Velamazán 87'	Stadium: Vicente Calderón

16 December 1995 17	FC Barcelona	1–0	Sporting de Gijón	Barcelona
	Popescu 7'			Stadium: Camp Nou

20 December 1995 18	Sevilla CF	1–0	FC Barcelona	Seville
	Monchu 37'			Stadium: Sánchez Pizjuán

4 January 1996 19	FC Barcelona	2–1	RCD Espanyol	Barcelona
	Nadal 15'; Óscar 89'		Bogdanović 68'	Stadium: Barcelona

7 January 1996 20	RC Celta	1–0	FC Barcelona	Vigo
	Sánchez 57'			Stadium: Balaídos

14 January 1996 21	FC Barcelona	1–1	Deportivo La Coruña	Barcelona
	Abelardo 58'		Radchenko 39'	Stadium: Camp Nou

21 January 1996 22	FC Barcelona	1–0	Real Valladolid	Barcelona
	Bakero 54'			Stadium: Camp Nou

25 January 1996 23	CP Merida	0–0	FC Barcelona	Mérida
				Stadium: Estadio Romano

28 January 1996 24	FC Barcelona	3–1	Real Zaragoza	Barcelona
	Óscar 12' de la Peña 57' 60'		Higuera 58'	Stadium: Camp Nou

4 February 1996 25	Rayo Vallecano	1–1	FC Barcelona	Madrid
	Aquino 29'		de la Peña 76'	Stadium: Vallecas

10 February 1996 26	FC Barcelona	3–0	Real Madrid	Barcelona
	Kodro 36' 89'; Luís Figo 71'			Stadium: Camp Nou

18 February 1996 27	Real Oviedo	1–2	FC Barcelona	Oviedo
	Oli 27'		Bakero 1'; Amor 81'	Stadium: Carlos Tartiere

25 February 1996 28	FC Barcelona	1–0	Real Betis	Barcelona
	Kodro 84'			Stadium: Camp Nou

2 March 1996 29	Athletic de Bilbao	0–0	FC Barcelona	Bilbao
				Stadium: San Mamés

9 March 1996 30	Valencia CF	4–1	FC Barcelona	Valencia
	Gómez 40'; Viola 43'; Mijatović 48' 88'		Amor 68'	Stadium: Mestalla

16 March 1996 31	FC Barcelona	1–0	Compostela	Barcelona
	Roger 8'			Stadium: Camp Nou

24 March 1996 32	UD Salamanca	1–3	FC Barcelona	Villares de la Reina
	Medina 11'		Amor 4'; Roger 18'; Óscar 30'	Stadium: El Helmántico

27 March 1996 33	FC Barcelona	2–2	CD Tenerife	Barcelona
	Amor 20'; Celades 35'		Pizzi 6'; Pinilla 31'	Stadium: Camp Nou

30 March 1996 34	Albacete	0–1	FC Barcelona	Albacete
			Óscar 51'	Stadium: Carlos Belmonte

6 April 1996 35	FC Barcelona	1–0	Real Sociedad	Barcelona
	Amor 32'			Stadium: Camp Nou

13 April 1996 36	Racing de Santander	1–1	FC Barcelona	Santander
	Suances 88'		Cuéllar 11'	Stadium: El Sardinero

20 April 1996 37	FC Barcelona	1–3	Atlético de Madrid	Barcelona
	Cruyff 25'		Roberto 10'; Vizcaíno 48'; Biagini 87'	Stadium: Camp Nou

28 April 1996 38	Sporting de Gijón	0–3	FC Barcelona	Gijón
			de la Peña 4'; Hagi 15'; Óscar 26'	Stadium: El Molinón

5 May 1996 39	FC Barcelona	1–1	Sevilla CF	Barcelona
	Bakero 49'		Moya 23'	Stadium: Camp Nou

15 May 1996 40	RCD Espanyol	1–1	FC Barcelona	Barcelona
	Urzaiz 87'		Luís Figo 51'	Stadium: Sarrià

19 May 1996 41	FC Barcelona	3–2	RC Celta	Barcelona
	Cuéllar 71'; Óscar 77' 88'		Alejo 44'; Gudelj 52'	Stadium: Camp Nou

26 May 1996 42	Deportivo La Coruña	2–2	FC Barcelona	A Coruña
	Bebeto 37' 57'		Guardiola 74'; Amor 87'	Stadium: Riazor

=== Copa del Rey ===
Round of 16

10 January 1996	Hércules CF	0–0	FC Barcelona	Alicante
				Stadium: José Rico Pérez; Attendance: 29,000

17 January 1996	FC Barcelona	4–1	Hércules CF	Barcelona
	Bakero 14'; Abelardo 44'; Kodro 52'; Amor 70'		Palomino 47'	Stadium: Camp Nou; Attendance: 35,000

Quarterfinals

1 February 1996	CD Numancia	2–2	FC Barcelona	Soria
	Alonso 1'; Movilla 89'	Report	Moreno 49', 55'	Stadium: Los Pajaritos; Attendance: 12,200

14 February 1996	FC Barcelona	3–1	CD Numancia	Barcelona
	Kodro 23'; Óscar 26'; Nadal 60'	Report	Barbarin 5'	Stadium: Camp Nou; Attendance: 60,000

Semifinals

22 February 1996	FC Barcelona	1–0	RCD Espanyol	Barcelona
	Popescu 51' (pen.)	Report		Stadium: Camp Nou; Attendance: 80,000

27 February 1996	RCD Espanyol	2–3	FC Barcelona	Barcelona
	García 38'; Urzaiz 62' (pen.)	Report	Kodro 41'; Amor 79'; Popescu 89'	Stadium: Sarrià; Attendance: 41,000

==== Final ====
10 April 1996	FC Barcelona	0–1	Atlético de Madrid	Zaragoza
		Report	102' Pantic	Stadium: La Romareda; Attendance: 36,500; Referee: Manuel Díaz Vega

=== UEFA Cup ===
==== First round ====
12 September 1995	Hapoel Be'er Sheva (Israel)	0–7	(Spain) FC Barcelona	Be'er Sheva
		Report	De la Peña 4'; Roger 45', 68', 78'; Óscar 63'; Figo 65', 81'	Stadium: Vasermil Stadium; Attendance: 13,500

26 September 1995	FC Barcelona (Spain)	5–0	(Israel) Hapoel Be'er Sheva	Barcelona
	Guardiola 12'; Hagi 27'; Velamazán 52'; Carreras 62'; Amor 66'	Report		Stadium: Camp Nou; Attendance: 24,000

==== Second round ====
17 October 1995	FC Barcelona (Spain)	3–0	(Portugal) Vitória de Guimarães	Barcelona
	Kodro 45', 66'; Celades 76'	Report		Stadium: Camp Nou; Attendance: 91,000; Referee: Alain Sars (France)

31 October 1995	Vitória de Guimarães (Portugal)	0–4	(Spain) FC Barcelona	Guimarães
		Report	Kodro 18'; Óscar 61'; Celades 66'; Sergi 77'	Stadium: D. Afonso Henriques; Attendance: 8,700; Referee: Hartmut Strampe (Germany)

==== Third round ====
21 November 1995	Sevilla FC (Spain)	1–1	(Spain) FC Barcelona	Seville
	Šuker 47'	Report	Hagi 69'	Stadium: Sánchez Pizjuán; Attendance: 42,000

5 December 1995	FC Barcelona (Spain)	3–1	(Spain) Sevilla FC	Barcelona
	Bakero 61'; Popescu 80'; Roger 82'	Report	Moya 81'	Stadium: Camp Nou; Attendance: 68,000

==== Quarterfinals ====
5 March 1996	FC Barcelona (Spain)	2–2	(Netherlands) PSV	Barcelona
21:00	Bakero 21'; Abelardo 70'	Report	Nilis 4', 50'	Stadium: Camp Nou; Attendance: 90,000; Referee: Anders Frisk (Sweden)

19 March 1996	PSV (Netherlands)	2–3	(Spain) FC Barcelona	Eindhoven
20:30	Zenden 43'; Eijkelkamp 65'	Report	Bakero 3'; Figo 22'; Sergi 80'	Stadium: Philips Stadion; Attendance: 30,000; Referee: Nikolai Levnikov (Russia)

==== Semifinals ====
2 April 1996	Bayern München (Germany)	2–2	(Spain) Barcelona	München
20:15 CET	Witeczek 52'; Scholl 57'	Report	Óscar 14'; Hagi 77'	Stadium: Olympiastadion, Attendance: 63,000; Referee: (Belgium) Michel Piraux

16 April 1996	Barcelona (Spain)	1–2	(Germany) Bayern München	Barcelona
21:00 CET	De la Peña 89'	Report	Babbel 40'; Witeczek 84'	Stadium: Camp Nou; Attendance: 90,000; Referee: (Bulgaria) Atanas Uzunov

=== Friendlies ===
GAMES 1995–1996

28-7-1995 FRIENDLY SV EPE-BARCELONA 0–18

29-7-1995 FRIENDLY BUITENPOST-BARCELONA 1–16

30-7-1995 FRIENDLY PEC ZWOLLE-BARCELONA 1–4

1-8-1995 FRIENDLY CAMBUUR LEEUWARDEN-BARCELONA 1–1

3-8-1995 FRIENDLY GRONINGEN-BARCELONA 2–2

5-8-1995 FRIENDLY UTRECHT-BARCELONA 3–3

6-8-1995 FRIENDLY AJAX-BARCELONA 1–4

10-8-1995 CITY OF PALMA TROPHY BARCELONA-VASCO DA GAMA 0–0/2–4/ PENALTY

12-8-1995 CITY OF PALMA TROPHY REAL BETIS-BARCELONA 2–3

16-8-1995 CITY OF LA LÍNEA TROPHY OLYMPIQUE LYON-BARCELONA 2–3

19-8-1995 MEMORIAL MARIO CECCHI GORI AC FIORENTINA-BARCELONA 2–0

19-8-1995 MEMORIAL MARIO CECCHI GORI VINCENZA-BARCELONA 1–2

22-8-1995 Joan Gamper Trophy BARCELONA-CSKA SOFIA 4–0

23-8-1995 Joan Gamper Trophy BARCELONA-SAN LORENZO 5–1

25-8-1995 FRIENDLY SEVILLA-BARCELONA 3–3

28-8-1995 FRIENDLY ALCAMPELL-BARCELONA 0–10

28-8-1995 COPA CATALUNYA BARCELONA-TÀRREGA 4–0

28-8-1995 COPA CATALUNYA LLEIDA-BARCELONA 0–0

13-3-1996 COPA CATALUNYA ESPANYOL-BARCELONA 5–1

== Statistics ==
=== Players statistics ===
No.	Pos	Nat	Player	Total		La Liga		Copa del Rey		UEFA Cup	
No.	Pos	Nat	Player	Apps	Goals	Apps	Goals	Apps	Goals	Apps	Goals
1	GK	(Spain) ESP	Busquets	52	-49	37	-33	7	-7	8	-9
2	DF	(Spain) ESP	Ferrer	43	0	28	0	6+1	0	7+1	0
20	DF	(Spain) ESP	Nadal	48	3	31+4	2	6	1	6+1	0
3	DF	(Spain) ESP	Abelardo	43	3	25+6	1	6	1	3+3	1
12	DF	(Spain) ESP	Sergi	53	2	39+1	0	6	0	7	2
4	DM	(Spain) ESP	Guardiola	47	2	28+4	1	7	0	7+1	1
5	DM	(Romania) ROU	Popescu	50	8	33+4	5	5	2	8	1
7	MF	(Portugal) POR	Figo	52	8	33+2	5	4+3	0	9+1	3
6	MF	(Spain) ESP	Bakero	46	10	28+4	6	4	1	9+1	3
24	MF	(Spain) ESP	Roger	46	9	27+6	5	2+2	0	8+1	4
9	FW	(Bosnia and Herzegovina) BIH	Kodro	43	15	26+6	9	5	3	6	3
13	GK	(Spain) ESP	Angoy	5	-3	4	-3	0	0	1	0
23	DM	(Spain) ESP	De la Peña	42	9	25+6	7	4	0	2+5	2
8	MF	(Spain) ESP	Amor	40	9	16+12	6	2+4	2	6	1
11	MF	(Romania) ROU	Hagi	28	6	12+7	3	4	0	5	3
21	MF	(Croatia) CRO	Prosinecki	23	2	12+7	2	2+2	0	0	0
16	MF	(Spain) ESP	Óscar	37	14	11+17	10	2+2	1	2+3	3
26	MF	(Spain) ESP	Celades	25	4	11+5	2	1	0	6+2	2
14	FW	(Netherlands) NED	Jordi Cruyff	18	2	11+2	2	1	0	2+2	0
19	DF	(Spain) ESP	Carreras	24	1	10+8	0	1	0	3+2	1
28	MF	(Spain) ESP	Velamazan	15	4	7+4	3	0+1	0	1+2	1
10	FW	(Spain) ESP	Cuellar	16	2	3+9	2	0+1	0	1+2	0
27	MF	(Spain) ESP	Juan Carlos	14	2	3+4	0	2+2	2	1+2	0
22	GK	(Spain) ESP	Lopetegui	3	-4	2	-3	0	0	1	-1
25	DF	(Spain) ESP	Quique Álvarez	2	0	1	0	0	0	1	0
29	DF	(Spain) ESP	Roca	1	0	1	0	0	0	0	0
31	MF	(Spain) ESP	Setvalls	1	0	0+1	0	0	0	0	0
32	FW	(Spain) ESP	García Pimienta	1	0	1	0	0	0	0	0
34	MF	(Spain) ESP	Juanjo	1	0	0+1	0	0	0	0	0
35	MF	(Spain) ESP	Rufete	1	0	0+1	0	0	0	0	0

== See also ==
- FC Barcelona
- 1995–96 UEFA Cup
- 1995–96 La Liga
- 1995–96 Copa del Rey
- Spanish Super Cup
