= Gausi =

Gausi might refer to:

- Antoni Gausí, Spanish footballer
- Gausian dynasty, Lombardian clan
