= Miguel Rubio =

Miguel Rubio may refer to:

- Miguel Ángel Rubio (footballer, born 1961), full name Miguel Ángel Rubio Buedo, Spanish footballer
- Miguel Ángel Rubio (gymnast) (born 1966), Spanish gymnast
- Miguel Rubio (footballer, born 1998), full name Miguel Ángel Rubio Lestan, Spanish footballer

== See also ==
- Miguel Ángel Rubiano (born 1984), Colombian road bicycle racer
