= Michel Pineda =

Association football player (1964–2026)

Personal information
- Full name: Michel Pineda Ozaeta
- Date of birth: 9 June 1964
- Place of birth: Gien, France
- Date of death: 29 October 2026 (aged 62)
- Place of death: Andorra
- Height: 1.82 m (6 ft 0 in)
- Position: Forward

Youth career
- 1974–1979: Sauvigny
- 1979–1982: Auxerre

Senior career*
Years	Team	Apps	(Gls)
1982–1984	Auxerre	7	(1)
1984–1990	Español	192	(52)
1990–1993	Toulon	97	(15)
1993–1994	Racing Santander	47	(11)
1994–1995	Lleida	23	(3)
1995–1996	Alavés	9	(0)
Total		375	(82)

International career
1984–1986	Spain U21	7	(1)
1987	Spain U23	1	(0)
- * Club domestic league appearances and goals

Michel Pineda Ozaeta (9 June 1964 – 29 October 2026) was a professional footballer who played as a forward.

He amassed La Liga totals of 201 matches and 50 goals over six seasons, representing in the competition Español (five years) and Racing de Santander. He started his senior career at Auxerre.

Born in France, Pineda represented Spain at youth level.

== Club career ==
The son of Spanish immigrants, Pineda was born in Gien, France, and played mainly in the country of his parents during his career, with spells in his nation of birth with Auxerre and Toulon. He appeared rarely in Ligue 1 with the former club over two seasons, being managed by Guy Roux and a teammate of Eric Cantona.

Pineda returned to Spain in the 1984 off-season, signing for Español and making his La Liga debut on 1 September as a 72nd-minute substitute in a 0–0 home draw against Atlético Madrid. In his third year, he scored 14 goals as the Catalans finished third – the league had a second stage, which caused all the teams to play 44 fixtures – netting a career-low with the club five in the 1988–89 campaign, which ended in relegation.

Pineda then returned to France, but moved back to the Iberian Peninsula in January 1993 with Racing de Santander, scoring seven goals in only ten matches as the Cantabrian side returned to the top flight. He added the game's only in the promotion/relegation play-off against Español, in Barcelona.

After one season apiece with Lleida and Alavés, both in the Segunda División, Pineda retired at the age of 32.

== Personal life and death ==
Pineda married Andorran citizen Montserrat Cardelús, and the couple had two daughters. He died on 29 October 2026 in the country, from a heart attack; he was 62.

== Honours ==
Español

- UEFA Cup runner-up: 1987–88

Spain U21

- UEFA European Under-21 Championship: 1986
