= Juan Carlos Moreno (Spanish footballer) =

Spanish footballer and manager

Personal information
- Full name: Juan Carlos Moreno Rodríguez
- Date of birth: 19 April 1975 (age 51)
- Place of birth: Barcelona, Spain
- Height: 1.73 m (5 ft 8 in)
- Position: Attacking midfielder

Youth career
- 1990–1994: Barcelona

Senior career*
Years	Team	Apps	(Gls)
1994–1997	Barcelona B	47	(8)
1995–1996	Barcelona	7	(0)
1997–1998	Albacete	23	(1)
1998–1999	Lleida	31	(1)
1999–2000	Recreativo	29	(4)
2000–2001	Lleida	40	(3)
2001–2002	Extremadura	37	(6)
2002–2003	Terrassa	16	(0)
2003–2010	Numancia	180	(32)
2010	→ Cartagena (loan)	9	(0)
Total		419	(55)

International career
1992–1993	Spain U18	3	(1)

Managerial career
- 2011–2013: Numancia (assistant)
- 2013–2016: Numancia B
- 2017: Peralada
- 2019: Girona (caretaker)
- * Club domestic league appearances and goals

Juan Carlos Moreno Rodríguez (born 19 April 1975) is a Spanish former professional footballer who played as an attacking midfielder.

He totalled 374 matches in the Segunda División over 14 seasons, scoring 51 goals in representation of eight teams, mainly Numancia. In La Liga, he appeared for Barcelona and Numancia.

After retiring, Moreno worked as a manager.

== Playing career ==
Born in Barcelona, Catalonia, Moreno was a product of Barcelona's youth academy. He appeared in 14 first-team matches in the 1995–96 season courtesy of manager Johan Cruyff, following which he would return to the reserves.

Moreno went on to have several Segunda División stints, mainly in his native region: Albacete, Lleida (twice), Recreativo de Huelva, Extremadura and Terrassa. For the 2003–04 campaign he joined Numancia, being first-choice from the start and producing his best individual season in his first year, scoring eight goals in 41 games (3,476 minutes) as the club returned to La Liga after an absence of three years.

On 14 September 2008, after Numancia had achieved another top-flight promotion, Moreno opened a 4–3 away defeat against Real Madrid. He was used somewhat regularly during that season and scored three times, but the Soria side were relegated.

In the last day of the January transfer window in 2010, Moreno was loaned to second-tier Cartagena until the end of 2009–10. In June, aged 35, he retired having made 419 league appearances in a 16-year professional career – scoring 55 goals – although only 45 in the top division, 38 of those with Numancia.

== Coaching career ==
Moreno remained at Numancia after his retirement, serving as assistant manager to Pablo Machín until taking control of the reserves of Tercera División in June 2013. He led them for three seasons, before terminating his contract two years early for personal reasons. The side contested the playoffs in 2015, losing 4–0 on aggregate in the final to Izarra.

For less than a week in late December 2017, Moreno was manager of Segunda División B club Peralada in his native region, leaving before his first match again for his own reasons. On 21 October 2019, following the dismissal of Juan Carlos Unzué, he was appointed interim at Girona who were mid-table in the second tier. He managed his first professional game six days later, a goalless home draw with Alcorcón.

== Managerial statistics ==
As of 27 October 2019

Managerial record by team and tenure
Team	Nat	From	To	Record								Ref
Team	Nat	From	To	G	W	D	L	GF	GA	GD	Win %	Ref
Numancia B	(Spain)	30 June 2013	21 July 2016	120	52	31	37	178	121	+57	43.33	
Peralada	(Spain)	23 December 2017	28 December 2017	0	0	0	0	0	0	+0	—	
Girona (caretaker)	(Spain)	21 October 2019	28 October 2019	1	0	1	0	0	0	+0	0.00	
Total				121	52	32	37	178	121	+57	42.98	—
