= Antonio Reyes =

Spanish footballer

Personal information
- Full name: Antonio Reyes González
- Date of birth: October 16, 1964 (age 62)
- Place of birth: Seville, Spain
- Height: 1.76 m (5 ft 9 in)
- Position: Midfielder

Youth career
- Betis

Senior career*
Years	Team	Apps	(Gls)
1981–1984	Betis B		
1983–1988	Betis	80	(3)
1984	→ Lorca Deportiva (loan)	7	(1)
1988–1989	Elche	18	(1)
1989–1990	Orihuela	31	(4)
1990–1991	Xerez	30	(1)
1991–1993	Villarreal	69	(12)
1993–1996	Mérida	102	(11)
1996–1997	Almería	28	(3)
1997–1998	Écija	30	(3)
Total		395+	(39+)
- * Club domestic league appearances and goals

Antonio Reyes González (born 16 October 1964) is a Spanish retired footballer who played as a midfielder.

== Football career ==
Brought up at local Real Betis, Reyes made his debut for the first team in 1983–84 (15 minutes in a 0–0 home draw against FC Barcelona), but only amassed 25 La Liga appearances across his first three seasons. He played significantly more in the following two, with a career-best 34 games and two goals in 1986–87 as the Andalusians ranked in ninth position; during his link to the club, he also spent one season on loan to fellow league side Elche CF, which ended in relegation.

Upon leaving the Verdiblancos in 1990, Reyes resumed his career in the second division, with brief stints in the third. In the former category, he represented Xerez CD, Villarreal CF, CP Mérida – achieving top flight promotion with the team in 1995 – and UD Almería, which would be his last spell in the division. He retired professionally at the age of 32 with top flight totals of 130 games and seven goals (adding 165/20 in level two).
