= Keko (footballer, born 1973) =

Spanish footballer

Personal information
- Full name: Francisco Martínez Jiménez
- Date of birth: 15 June 1973 (age 53)
- Place of birth: Barcelona, Spain
- Height: 1.79 m (5 ft 10 in)
- Position: Striker

Youth career
- Manlleu

Senior career*
Years	Team	Apps	(Gls)
1991	Manlleu	2	(0)
1992–1993	Granollers		
1993–1994	Figueres	27	(2)
1994–1995	Hospitalet	34	(11)
1995–1997	Sabadell	68	(12)
1997–1998	Guadix	18	(11)
1998–2000	Cartagena	70	(33)
2000–2001	Figueres	37	(17)
2001	Toledo	4	(2)
2001–2003	Terrassa	80	(33)
2003–2005	Tenerife	75	(26)
2005–2006	Poli Ejido	47	(9)
2007–2008	Lleida	50	(11)
2008–2009	Gavà	36	(21)
2009–2010	Sant Andreu	29	(7)
Total		577	(195)
- * Club domestic league appearances and goals

Francisco Martínez Jiménez (born 15 June 1973), known as Keko, is a Spanish former professional footballer who played as a striker.

He amassed Segunda División totals of 160 games and 44 goals over five seasons, representing in the competition Terrassa, Tenerife and Poli Ejido. He added 387 matches and 141 goals in the Segunda División B, where he spent the better part of his 18-year senior career.

== Club career ==
Keko was born in Barcelona, Catalonia. During his career, spent mainly in the Segunda División B, he played for 14 clubs, mostly in his native region. His first full season in the competition was 1993–94, when he helped UE Figueres to the fourth position.

From 2002, Keko played five consecutive campaigns in the Segunda División, starting with Terrassa FC then scoring an average of 13 league goals for CD Tenerife – although the team never promoted to La Liga– adding two years with Andalusia's Polideportivo Ejido. In January 2007, the 33-year-old returned to the third tier, signing with UE Lleida.
