= Nakor Bueno =

Spanish footballer

Nakor
Personal information
- Full name: Nakor Bueno Gómez
- Date of birth: 4 March 1978 (age 48)
- Place of birth: Barcelona, Spain
- Height: 1.78 m (5 ft 10 in)
- Position: Forward

Youth career
- 1984–1993: Badia
- 1993–1997: Mercantil

Senior career*
Years	Team	Apps	(Gls)
1997–1999	Barcelona C	61	(27)
1998–2000	Barcelona B	50	(13)
2000–2006	Lleida	193	(48)
2006–2008	Castellón	48	(7)
2008–2010	Poli Ejido	75	(23)
2010–2011	Leganés	28	(4)
2011–2012	Sant Andreu	25	(4)
2013	Castelldefels	12	(3)
2015	Ordino	2	(0)
Total		494	(129)

Managerial career
- 2019–2020: Sabadell B (assistant)
- * Club domestic league appearances and goals

Nakor Bueno Gómez (born 4 March 1978), known simply as Nakor, is a Spanish former footballer who played as a forward.

He spent most of his professional career with Lleida, having signed in 2000.

== Football career ==
Born in Barcelona, Catalonia, Nakor played youth football with two local clubs. In 1997 he signed with giants FC Barcelona, but only appeared for their C and B-teams.

Nakor would establish his professional career at neighbouring UE Lleida, where he spent six years. He totalled 200 competitive matches during his spell at the Camp d'Esports, the first and the last seasons being played in the second division.

After the team's relegation in 2006, Nakor stayed in the second level by joining CD Castellón. In the summer of 2008 he returned to division three, with Polideportivo Ejido; he continued to play in the latter tier in the following campaigns, with CD Leganés and UE Sant Andreu.

== Personal life ==
Nakor's younger brother, Aarón, was also a footballer. A winger, he spent most of his career in the lower leagues.

== Coaching career ==
In July 2019, Nakor was appointed assistant coach of Sabadell's reserve team, Sabadell B. He left the position in December 2019.
