= Ciutat de Lleida Trophy =

Football tournament in Spain

Ciutat de Lleida Trophy is a "friendly" football (soccer) tournament played annually in Lleida (province of Lleida, Catalonia, Spain).

== Ciutat de Lleida Trophy ==
Year	Winner	Runner up	Score	Winner scorers	Runner up scorers
1987 August 9th	(Spain) UE Lleida	(Mexico) Pumas	2-2 on penalties	Roberto (55'), Planelles (86')	Vázquez (23'), Raya (76')
1990 August 14th	(Uruguay) Peñarol	(Spain) UE Lleida	2-1	Silvero (2'), Generali (85')	Azcona (1')
1991 August 19th	(Soviet Union) Torpedo	(Spain) UE Lleida	2-1	Griskin (61'), Uljnov (80')	Bartolo (37')
1992 August 27th	(Spain) UE Lleida	(Brazil) Atlético Mineiro	2-1	Palau (9'), Gonzalo (17')	Nael (26')
1994 August 9th	(Spain) UE Lleida	(Spain) Betis	2-1	Salillas (p) (70'), (82')	Márquez (38')
1995 August 17th	(Spain) UE Lleida	(Spain) Athletic	3-1	Lente (5'), Salillas (80'), (p) (82')	Valverde (p) (9')
1997 August 21st	(Spain) UE Lleida	Japan Olympic Team	3-0	Setvalls (18'), Escoda (66'), Roa (78')	
1998 August 14th	(Spain) Barcelona	(Spain) UE Lleida	2-2 on penalties	Cocu (9'), Óscar (67')	Setvalls (43'), Moreno (p) (52')
1999 August 6th	(Greece) PAOK	(Spain) UE Lleida	5-2	Bandović (25'), Dollberg (50'), Frousos (58'), (62'), Toursounidis (70')	Peña (18'), Escoda (36')
2000 August 19th	(Spain) UE Lleida	(Italy) Fiorentina	2-1	Lusarreta (56'), Garrido (76')	Gomes (11')
2001 August 7th	(Spain) Espanyol	(Spain) UE Lleida	2-2 on penalties	Aganzo (56'), (57')	Caballero (22'), Sergio Rodríguez (83')
2002 August 20th	(Spain) Espanyol	(Spain) UE Lleida	2-0	Velamazán (6'), Luque (51')	
2003 August 18th	(Spain) Nàstic	(Spain) UE Lleida	2-1	Sukia (9'), Lusarreta (83')	Toño (28')
2004 August 17th	(Spain) UE Lleida	(Serbia and Montenegro) Obilić	3-1	Nakor (1'), (12'), Sergio Rodríguez (45')	Đokić (90')
2005 August 12th	(Spain) Mallorca	(Spain) UE Lleida	3-0	Luis García (27'), Pereira (69'), Arango (80')	
2006 August 17th	(Spain) UE Lleida	(Spain) Castellón	1-1 on penalties	Unai (15')	Tabares (31')
2007 August 21st	(Spain) UE Lleida	(Spain) Lleida Selection ^{1}	1-0	Keko (44')	
2008 August 20th	(Spain) UE Lleida	(Spain) Lleida Selection ^{1}	3-1	David Giménez (70'), Campabadal (86'), Mikel Álvaro (88')	Castellana (34')
2009 August 20th	(Spain) Lleida Selection ^{1}	(Spain) UE Lleida	1-1 on penalties	Cheikh (29')	Galiano (p) (44')
2010 August 18th	(Spain) Huesca	(Spain) UE Lleida	1-0	Roberto	

^{1} Lleida Selection was a team formed by players from CF Balaguer, UE Tàrrega and FC Benavent.
