= Eladio Perez =

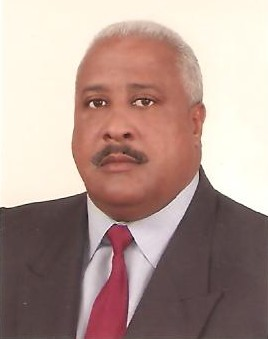
Eladio Perez

Eladio Antonio Pérez Núñez (18 February 1956 – 5 November 2008) was a deputy and member of the Partido Revolucionario Dominicano (PDR) who ran and was defeated in a May 2006 election to the Congress in the Dominican Republic for the office representing the district of Villa Altagracia. He was twice before elected to the Congress, serving in 1982–1986, and from 1986 to 1990. Pérez was killed in a shooting in a small jewelry store in November 2008 in San Carlos. He was shot by the owner of the store who claimed Pérez and three others were engaging in robbery attempt. Pérez's relatives claim he went to the store to collect for a large debt.
