= Antoni Gausí =

Spanish footballer (1927–2021)

Personal information
- Full name: Antonio Gausí Subías
- Date of birth: 10 December 1927
- Place of birth: Lleida, Spain
- Date of death: 7 May 2021 (aged 93)
- Position: Right winger

Youth career
- Ilerda
- Leridano

Senior career*
Years	Team	Apps	(Gls)
1946–1951	Lérida		
1951–1953	Real Madrid	1	(0)
1953–1958	Celta de Vigo	114	(21)
1958–1960	Zaragoza	28	(1)
1960–1962	Levante	52	(7)
Total		195	(29)
- * Club domestic league appearances and goals

Antonio Gausí Subías (10 December 1927 – 7 May 2021) was a Spanish professional footballer who played as a right winger.

== Career ==
Born in Lleida, Gausí played for Ilerda, Leridano, Lérida, Real Madrid, Celta de Vigo, Zaragoza and Levante.

He obtained a degree in economics and had two spells as President of UE Lleida, from 1982 to 1986 and from 1998 to 2002.
