= James Cantero =

Uruguayan footballer and agent (born 1967)

Personal information
- Full name: James Cantero Coitiño
- Date of birth: 7 February 1967 (age 59)
- Place of birth: Paso de los Toros, Tacuarembó, Uruguay
- Height: 1.80 m (5 ft 11 in)
- Position: Striker

Senior career*
Years	Team	Apps	(Gls)
1985	Independiente Flores		
1986	Defensor		
1987	Rampla Juniors		
1988–1989	Uruguay de Coronado	51	(41)
1990–1991	Lleida	37	(17)
1992–1994	Real Murcia	50	(41)
1994	Sport Boys	12	(10)
1995	Correcaminos	7	(3)
1999	Lorca	15	(15)
- * Club domestic league appearances and goals

James Cantero Coitiño (born 7 February 1967) is a Uruguayan former football striker and player's agent.

== Career ==
Born in Paso de los Toros, Tacuarembó, Cantero began playing football in the Uruguayan Primera División with Independiente Flores at age 16. Two years later, he joined Montevideo-based side Defensor Sporting Club. He also played for Rampla Juniors before moving to Costa Rica to play for Club Sport Uruguay de Coronado.

In August 1990, Cantero joined Segunda División side UE Lleida, where the 23-year-old would lead the club with 17 league goals. After one season, Real Murcia signed Cantero, in January 1992. Cantero scored 41 goals for Murcia, including 25 goals during the 1992–93 Segunda División B season.

Cantero next embarked on a journeyman's career, playing for Sport Boys in Peru, Correcaminos UAT in Mexico, as well as clubs in El Salvador, Honduras and United Arab Emirates. He finished his career in the Segunda División B with Lorca Deportiva.

== Retirement ==
After he retired from playing football, Cantero became a player's agent and also acts as a consultant for Mexican club CF Pachuca. The famous Uruguayan writer Eduardo Galeano tells a thrilling story involving the player and the writer himself in his latest book entitled "The Hunter Stories" pages 218 and 219

== Personal ==
Cantero's son, Adrian, is also a footballer who plays for CF Pachuca's youth teams.
