= José Amavisca =

Spanish footballer (born 1971)

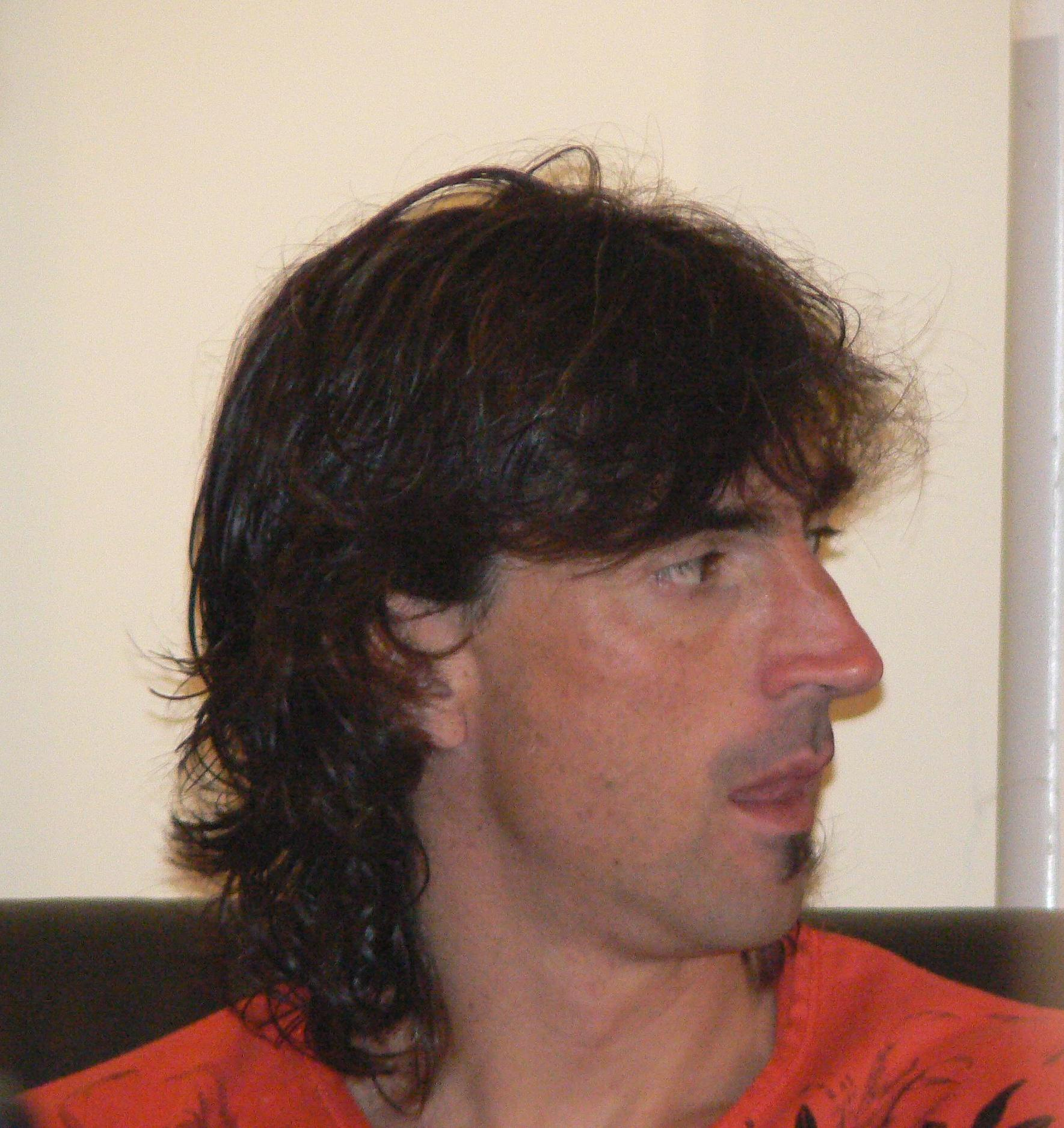
- Amavisca in 2007

Personal information
- Full name: José Emilio Amavisca Gárate
- Date of birth: 19 June 1971 (age 55)
- Place of birth: Laredo, Spain
- Height: 1.82 m (6 ft 0 in)
- Positions: Winger; second striker

Youth career
- Laredo

Senior career*
Years	Team	Apps	(Gls)
1988–1989	Laredo		
1989–1994	Valladolid	74	(15)
1991–1992	→ Lleida (loan)	37	(14)
1994–1998	Real Madrid	113	(13)
1999–2001	Racing Santander	84	(10)
2001–2004	Deportivo La Coruña	51	(3)
2004–2005	Espanyol	22	(2)
Total		381	(57)

International career
1989–1990	Spain U20	3	(1)
1991–1992	Spain U21	2	(1)
1992	Spain U23	4	(1)
1994–1997	Spain	15	(1)
Medal record
Representing Spain
Men's Football
Gold medal – first place	1992 Barcelona	Team competition
- * Club domestic league appearances and goals

José Emilio Amavisca Gárate (born 19 June 1971) is a Spanish former professional footballer who played as a left winger or a second striker.

He was best known for his Real Madrid stint but played for five other clubs, amassing 381 matches and 57 goals across both major levels of Spanish football over 16 seasons (307 games and 34 goals in La Liga).

A Spanish international in the 1990s, Amavisca represented the country at Euro 1996.

== Club career ==
Born in Laredo, Cantabria, Amavisca (whose father Emilio was also a footballer) made his professional breakthrough with Real Valladolid, achieving promotion from Segunda División in 1992–93 and previously serving a spell on loan to Lleida in the same level. In summer 1994, he signed for La Liga giants Real Madrid, initially being deemed surplus to requirements but going on to score ten league goals in his debut season, mostly playing second striker to Iván Zamorano – both were initially seen as third or fourth-string attacking references by manager Jorge Valdano, as the club ended a five-year domestic title drought.

Amavisca's importance with the Merengues would gradually lessen in the subsequent years, however, with coach Guus Hiddink not even including him in matchday squads when he was short of the 18 players to complete it. In January 1999, he joined fellow top-flight Racing de Santander, thus returning to his native region, and instantly became an essential member of the side, although his seven goals in the 2000–01 campaign were not enough to avoid relegation.

Subsequently, Amavisca moved to Deportivo de La Coruña for 300 million pesetas, appearing in 28 games and netting three times for the 2002 runners-up but being sparingly used in the following two years, barred by veteran Fran and new signing Albert Luque. He retired at the end of 2004–05 with Espanyol, aged 34.

== International career ==
Amavisca won his first cap for Spain on 7 September 1994, playing the full 90 minutes in a 2–1 away win over against Cyprus in the UEFA Euro 1996 qualifiers. He was picked for the tournament's finals in England, making three appearances in an eventual quarter-final exit.

Due to having fallen out of favour at Real Madrid, Amavisca was overlooked for the squad at the 1998 FIFA World Cup. The penultimate of his 15 internationals was on 8 June 1997 in a World Cup qualifying match against the Czech Republic, where manager Javier Clemente deployed him as a left-back.

Previously, Amavisca won the gold medal at the 1992 Summer Olympics in Barcelona.

== Career statistics ==
#	Date	Venue	Opponent	Score	Result	Competition
1.	26 April 1995	Hrazdan, Yerevan, Armenia	Armenia	0–1	0–2	Euro 1996 qualifying

== Honours ==
Laredo

- Tercera División: 1988–89

Real Madrid

- La Liga: 1994–95, 1996–97
- Supercopa de España: 1997
- UEFA Champions League: 1997–98

Deportivo

- Copa del Rey: 2001–02

Spain U23

- Summer Olympic Games: 1992

Individual

- Don Balón Award: 1995
