= Jaime Quesada =

Spanish footballer

Personal information
- Full name: Jaime Quesada Chavarría
- Date of birth: 21 September 1971 (age 55)
- Place of birth: Barcelona, Spain
- Height: 1.77 m (5 ft 10 in)
- Position: Right-back

Senior career*
Years	Team	Apps	(Gls)
1989–1992	Hospitalet	27	(0)
1992–1994	Lleida	68	(2)
1994–1999	Betis	118	(0)
1999–2000	Las Palmas	30	(0)
2000–2001	Recreativo	14	(0)
2001–2002	Las Palmas	3	(0)
2002–2003	Cultural Leonesa	0	(0)
Total		260	(2)
- * Club domestic league appearances and goals

Jaime Quesada Chavarría (born 21 September 1971) is a Spanish former professional footballer who played as a right-back.

== Club career ==
Quesada was born in Barcelona, Catalonia. During his career, he represented CE L'Hospitalet, UE Lleida, Real Betis (signing in summer 1994, he lived his most successful period there, notably featuring in 34 games in his first year as the Andalusians finished third straight out of Segunda División), UD Las Palmas, Recreativo de Huelva and Cultural y Deportiva Leonesa.

Quesada totalled 155 matches in La Liga and scored two goals, both for Lleida in the 1993–94 season; the first of these on 20 November 1993 was the only goal in the 87th minute away to Johan Cruyff's FC Barcelona at the Camp Nou. He retired in 2003 due to a serious fibula injury, and later returned to Betis as a youth coach.
