= Nikola Milinković =

Bosnian former footballer (born 1968)

Personal information
- Date of birth: 19 March 1968 (age 58)
- Place of birth: Sanski Most, SR Bosnia and Herzegovina, Yugoslavia
- Height: 1.92 m (6 ft 4 in)
- Position: Midfielder

Youth career
- Radnički Zdena

Senior career*
Years	Team	Apps	(Gls)
1991–1993	Bečej	58	(24)
1993–1995	Lleida	60	(12)
1995–1996	Almería	32	(10)
1996–1997	Chaves	39	(8)
1998–1999	Ourense	34	(4)
1999–2001	Alverca	61	(15)
2001–2004	Grazer AK	63	(10)
2004–2005	ASK Schwadorf		
2006	USV Markt Hartmannsdorf	8	(2)
Total		355	(85)
- * Club domestic league appearances and goals

Nikola Milinković (Serbian Cyrillic: Никола Милинковић; born 19 March 1968) is a Bosnian retired footballer who played as a midfielder.

== Career ==
Born in Sanski Most, SR Bosnia and Herzegovina, at the time part of Yugoslavia, Milinković started playing with local side Radnički Zdena. Just before the Bosnian War started, he moved to Serbia and played with FK Bečej. He was spotted by Spanish club Lleida that signed him in 1993. He moved to Almería two years later where he had a short spell. He moved twice more to two other clubs on the Iberian Peninsula where he had similarly short spells, namely Ourense and Portuguese clubs Chaves and Alverca. In 2001, he signed with Austrian club Grazer AK where he spent four seasons and effectively retired from professional football with ASK Schwadorf. He ended his career at Austrian lower league side USV Markt Hartmannsdorf.

== Personal life ==
Milinković is the father of footballers and Serbia internationals Sergej Milinković-Savić and Vanja Milinković-Savić and basketball player Jana Milinković-Savić.
