= Txema Alonso =

Spanish footballer

Personal information
- Full name: José María Alonso Fernández
- Date of birth: 29 April 1971 (age 55)
- Place of birth: Bilbao, Spain
- Height: 1.86 m (6 ft 1 in)
- Positions: Centre-back; defensive midfielder

Youth career
- Indautxu

Senior career*
Years	Team	Apps	(Gls)
1989–1995	Lleida	204	(16)
1995–2003	Racing Santander	161	(4)
2002–2003	→ Getafe (loan)	15	(0)
2003–2006	Lleida	86	(3)
Total		466	(23)

International career
1991–1992	Spain U21	2	(0)
- * Club domestic league appearances and goals

José María "Txema" Alonso Fernández (born 29 April 1971) is a Spanish retired footballer who played as a centre-back or defensive midfielder.

He amassed La Liga totals of 183 matches and five goals during seven seasons, in representation of Lleida and Racing de Santander. He added 221 games and 11 goals in Segunda División, where he also featured for both clubs.

== Club career ==
Born in Bilbao, Biscay, Txema's professional career was closely associated to UE Lleida, which he represented in all three major levels of Spanish football. He contributed with 35 games and three goals in the 1992–93 season as the team returned to La Liga after a 42-year absence, and made his debut in the competition on 5 September 1993 by starting in a 0–1 away loss against CD Tenerife.

Txema signed for Racing de Santander in the summer of 1995, being first-choice in his first four years but mainly a backup afterwards. In the 2001–02 campaign, he played only 12 matches to help the Cantabrians finish second behind Atlético Madrid and subsequently return to the top flight.

Aged 32, Txema returned to his main club for 2003–04, after a loan stint at Getafe CF, and immediately helped them achieve promotion to the second tier. He retired at the end of the 2005–06 season, which finished in relegation.

== Personal life ==
Txema's father José María (a forward who played for several clubs in the second tier) and elder brother Kike (a midfielder who mainly competed in the third tier) were also footballers – the siblings faced off once in the league, in 1990, and three times in the Copa del Rey, including part of a memorable underdog run by CD Numancia in the 1995–96 season.

After his retirement, Txema worked in the sports department of the Lleida city council.

== Honours ==
Lleida

- Segunda División: 1992–93
- Segunda División B: 1989–90, 2003–04
