= Nostra Catalunya Trophy =

The Nostra Catalunya Trophy (Catalan: Torneig Nostra Catalunya) was an annual pre-season football competition hosted by RCD Espanyol between 1974 and 1990. The guests were the best Catalan teams of the previous season excluding Espanyol and FC Barcelona.

The competition was a four team tournament and included two semi-finals and a final played before the Ciutat de Barcelona Trophy. For the first competition in 1974, the four teams were Gimnàstic de Tarragona, Girona FC, UE Lleida and UE Sant Andreu.

== Winners and finals ==
| Edition | Year | Winners | Runners Up | Score |
|---|---|---|---|---|
| XVII | 1990 | Sabadell | Lleida | 1-1 (p) |
| XVI | 1989 | Sabadell | Lleida | 3-2 |
| XV | 1988 | Sabadell | Figueres | 2-2 (p) |
| XIV | 1987 | Lleida | Girona | 2-0 |
| XIII | 1986 | Lleida | Nàstic | 1-0 |
| XII | 1985 | Hospitalet | Lleida | 3-3 (p) |
| XI | 1984 | Figueres | Sabadell | 0-0 (p) |
| X | 1983 | Nàstic | Lleida | 2-1 |
| IX | 1982 | Figueres | Nàstic | 0-0 (p) |
| VIII | 1981 | Lleida | Figueres | 1-1 (p) |
| VII | 1980 | Nàstic | Sabadell | 0-0 (p) |
| VI | 1979 | Sabadell | Girona | 5-0 |
| V | 1978 | Sabadell | Nàstic | 1-1 (p) |
| IV | 1977 | Lleida | Terrassa | 1-1 (p) |
| III | 1976 | Barcelona Atlètic | Nàstic | 1-0 |
| II | 1975 | Lleida | Nàstic | 2-1 |
| I | 1974 | Lleida | Girona | 2-1 |

== Titles by club ==
| Team | Titles |
|---|---|
| Lleida | 6 |
| Sabadell | 5 |
| Figueres | 2 |
| Nàstic | 2 |
| Barcelona Atlètic | 1 |
| L'Hospitalet | 1 |

== Participations by club ==
| 17 | Nàstic |
| 16 | Lleida |
| 10 | Sabadell |
| 8 | Figueres |
| 8 | Girona |
| 3 | Hospitalet |
| 2 | Sant Andreu |
| 1 | Barcelona Atlètic |
| 1 | Mollerussa |
| 1 | Olot |
| 1 | Palamós |
| 1 | Terrassa |

== See also ==
- Copa Catalunya
