= Miguel Ángel Rubio (footballer, born 1961) =

Spanish football player/manager

Personal information
- Full name: Miguel Ángel Rubio Buedo
- Date of birth: 31 August 1961 (age 65)
- Place of birth: Cuenca, Spain
- Height: 1.72 m (5 ft 7 1/2 in)
- Position: Defensive midfielder

Senior career*
Years	Team	Apps	(Gls)
1982–1996	Lleida	463	(29)

Managerial career
- 1997: Lleida
- 1999: Lleida
- 2000–2001: Lleida
- 2001–2002: Reus
- 2003–2006: Lleida
- 2007: Cultural Leonesa
- 2008–2009: Atlético Monzón
- 2010: Atlético Monzón
- 2011–2016: Ascó
- 2017–2021: Fraga
- 2021: Tàrrega
- 2022: Lleida Esportiu (youth)
- * Club domestic league appearances and goals

Miguel Ángel Rubio Buedo (born 31 August 1961) is a Spanish former professional footballer who played as a defensive midfielder. He was also a manager.

== Football career ==
Born in Cuenca, Castilla–La Mancha, Rubio played exclusively for UE Lleida during his professional career. With the Catalans, he experienced relegation to Segunda División B in 1989, with immediate promotion, but also a La Liga season in 1993–94 after a 43-year absence (he only missed three matches and scored three goals, but the team went down again).

At the end of the 1995–96 campaign, spent in the Segunda División, Rubio retired aged almost 35, with 530 competitive appearances to his credit. He would coach his favorite club on no fewer than four occasions – only one consecutive spell – being relegated to the third tier twice, and also managed CF Reus Deportiu, Cultural y Deportiva Leonesa, Atlético Monzón, FC Ascó and UD Fraga.

== Personal life ==
Rubio's son, Óscar was also a footballer. Having been born in Catalonia whilst his father represented Lleida, he too played for that club amongst others.

== Managerial statistics ==
As of 24 February 2016

Team	Nat	From	To	Record				
Team	Nat	From	To	G	W	D	L	Win %
Lleida	(Spain)	12 January 1997	26 January 1997	5	2	0	3	40.00
Lleida	(Spain)	20 February 1999	7 March 1999	3	2	1	0	66.67
Lleida	(Spain)	2 September 2000	4 February 2001	24	3	8	13	12.50
Lleida	(Spain)	24 October 2003	30 April 2006	120	47	29	44	39.17
Cultural Leonesa	(Spain)	28 January 2007	28 January 2007	1	0	0	1	0.00

== Honours ==
=== Player ===
Lleida

- Segunda División: 1992–93
- Segunda División B: 1989–90

=== Manager ===
Lleida

- Segunda División B: 2003–04

Monzón

- Tercera División: 2008–09

== See also ==
- List of one-club men
