= UE Lleida =

Association football team in Spain

Coordinates: 41.621386°N 0.614033°E

Lleida
- Full name: Unió Esportiva Lleida
- Nicknames: Els Blaus (The Blues); Els de la Terra Ferma (Firmlanders)
- Founded: 1939 (as Lérida Balompié-AEM); 1947 (as Unión Deportiva Lérida)
- Dissolved: 10 May 2011
- Ground: Camp d´Esports, Lleida, Catalonia, Spain
- Capacity: 13,500
Home colours	Away colours

Unió Esportiva Lleida was a Spanish football team based in Lleida, in the autonomous community of Catalonia. It was founded as Lérida Balompié-AEM on 30 October 1939, and became Unión Deportiva Lérida in 1947, after a merger with CD Leridano. It held home matches at Camp d´Esports, with a 13,500-seat capacity. It was dissolved in 2011 due to debts of €28 million, then acquired by a local entrepreneur and renamed Lleida Esportiu.

Lleida adopted the Catalan version of its name in 1978. The club spent most of its history in the lower divisions, but in the early 1950s and early 1990s, the club won promotion to La Liga.

During the 1990s the club was managed by Mané, Juande Ramos and Víctor Muñoz, all of whom subsequently became successful managers with other clubs. From 1987 the club organised its own summer trophy, the Ciutat de Lleida Trophy.

== History ==
=== Early Lleida football clubs ===
Football was first introduced to Lleida in 1910 by Manuel Azoz, a Barcelona business man. Among the earliest clubs in the city were Montserrat, founded in 1913 by Marist Brothers, and FC Lleida founded in 1914. Both played their early games in the district of Pla d’en Gardeny. In 1915, the Associació Cultural Lleidatana was founded by Catalan nationalists.

By 1917 two other clubs, Club Colonial and Athlètic Metalúrgic, began playing at the Camp de Mart. In 1918 FC Joventut was formed by left-wing Catalan republicans and during the 1920s they emerged as the city's strongest side.

In 1919, Lleida became the first club to use the Camp d´Esports, but this team was dissolved in 1927. Other clubs of the 1920s included AE Lleida Calaveres, Lleida Sport Club and AEM Lleida, all of which disappeared during the 1930s.

=== Lérida Balompié and CD Leridano ===
After the Spanish Civil War, former members of AE Lleida Calaveres, Lleida Sport Club and AEM Lleida formed Lérida Balompié-AEM. After playing in regional leagues for four seasons they made their debut in the fourth division in 1943. The following year, the club split into two clubs, Lérida Balompié and AEM.

Meanwhile, in 1941 Spanish nationalists formed CD Leridano, and a local rivalry developed between that club and Lérida Balompié. On March 9, 1947, these two sides merged to become Unión Deportiva Lérida. The new team retained both the blue and white colours and club shield of Lérida Balompié, the first president of the new club being Eduard Estadella.

=== First golden era ===
UD Lérida enjoyed a golden age in the late 1940s and early 1950s, when they progressed from the third to the first division in just three seasons. In 1949, they won the third-tier and, the following season, 1949–50, they made their debut in Segunda División.

In the 1949–50 season the club achieved their biggest league victory in their history with a 9–2 win against CD Lugo, along with finishing second in the league achieving promotion to the topflight for the first time ever. However, during its debut season, it was heavily defeated on several occasions: 9–0 to CD Málaga, 10–1 to Deportivo de La Coruña and 10–0 to Athletic Bilbao, being ultimately relegated back. Lleida's first eleven in the first division was: Rivero, Rigau, Telechea, Carrillo, Esquerda, Roca, Gausí, Pellicer, Ramón, Bidegain and Fustero.

=== The Mané era ===
In the late 1980s and early 1990s, Lleida enjoyed a second solid moment, under coach Mané. He joined the club in 1988 and took it from Segunda División B to La Liga.

1993–94 was the second topflight experience for the club; in spite of a 1–0 win over the FC Barcelona Dream Team at the Camp Nou, and another against Real Madrid, 2–1 at home, Lleida only won seven times altogether and was relegated once again.

The 1994–95 season saw the club finish third in the second division, with a subsequent promotion play-off defeat against Sporting de Gijón. In 2001, the team returned to level three and, in 2004–05 and the following campaign, played again in the second division. From 1996 and during an entire decade (with some interruptions), legendary player Miguel Ángel Rubio served as its manager.

=== Liquidation ===
On 10 May 2011, Lleida was placed in a liquidation auction due to a €28 million debt. On 12 July, the team's seat was acquired by local entrepreneur Sisco Pujol, with the new club being named Lleida Esportiu.

== Season to season ==
Season	Tier	Division	Place	Copa del Rey
1939–40	6	2ª Reg.	2nd	
1940–41	6	2ª Reg.	1st	
1941–42	4	1ª Reg. B	1st	
1942–43	3	1ª Reg. A	6th	
1943–44	3	3ª	9th	Fourth round
1944–45	3	3ª	9th	DNP
1945–46	3	3ª	10th	DNP
1946–47	3	3ª	3rd	DNP
1947–48	3	3ª	4th	Fifth round
1948–49	3	3ª	1st	Second round
1949–50	2	2ª	2nd	First round
1950–51	1	1ª	16th	DNP
1951–52	2	2ª	7th	DNP
1952–53	2	2ª	6th	Second round
1953–54	2	2ª	3rd	DNP
1954–55	2	2ª	10th	DNP
1955–56	2	2ª	12th	DNP
1956–57	2	2ª	20th	DNP
1957–58	3	3ª	2nd	DNP
1958–59	3	3ª	7th	DNP

Season	Tier	Division	Place	Copa del Rey
1959–60	3	3ª	6th	DNP
1960–61	3	3ª	6th	DNP
1961–62	3	3ª	6th	DNP
1962–63	3	3ª	4th	DNP
1963–64	3	3ª	2nd	DNP
1964–65	3	3ª	2nd	DNP
1965–66	2	2ª	11th	Round of 32
1966–67	2	2ª	12th	Round of 32
1967–68	2	2ª	12th	First round
1968–69	3	3ª	5th	DNP
1969–70	3	3ª	10th	First round
1970–71	4	Reg. Pref.	1st	DNP
1971–72	3	3ª	5th	Second round
1972–73	3	3ª	4th	Second round
1973–74	3	3ª	11th	Third round
1974–75	3	3ª	15th	DNP
1975–76	3	3ª	5th	DNP
1976–77	3	3ª	9th	Third round
1977–78	3	2ª B	16th	Second round
1978–79	3	2ª B	11th	Third round

Season	Division	Tier	Place	Copa del Rey
1979–80	3	2ª B	6th	Third round
1980–81	3	2ª B	10th	Second round
1981–82	3	2ª B	14th	First round
1982–83	3	2ª B	10th	DNP
1983–84	3	2ª B	8th	First round
1984–85	3	2ª B	6th	Second round
1985–86	3	2ª B	4th	Round of 16
1986–87	3	2ª B	2nd	First round
1987–88	2	2ª	6th	Third round
1988–89	2	2ª	19th	Round of 32
1989–90	3	2ª B	1st	First round
1990–91	2	2ª	6th	Third round
1991–92	2	2ª	5th	Fourth round
1992–93	2	2ª	1st	Round of 16
1993–94	1	1ª	19th	Fifth round
1994–95	2	2ª	3rd	Round of 16

Season	Division	Tier	Place	Copa del Rey
1995–96	2	2ª	11th	Second round
1996–97	2	2ª	11th	Round of 16
1997–98	2	2ª	5th	Second round
1998–99	2	2ª	11th	Third round
1999–2000	2	2ª	5th	Round of 16
2000–01	2	2ª	22nd	Second round
2001–02	3	2ª B	9th	Round of 32
2002–03	3	2ª B	8th	First round
2003–04	3	2ª B	1st	DNP
2004–05	2	2ª	15th	Round of 16
2005–06	2	2ª	19th	Fourth round
2006–07	3	2ª B	14th	Second round
2007–08	3	2ª B	13th	DNP
2008–09	3	2ª B	8th	DNP
2009–10	3	2ª B	11th	DNP
2010–11	3	2ª B	5th	DNP

- 2 seasons in Primera División
- 24 seasons in Segunda División
- 19 seasons in Segunda División B
- 22 seasons in Tercera División (until 1976–77 as third level)

== Honours ==
=== Official ===
- Segunda División: 1992–93
- Segunda División B: 1989–90, 2003–04
- Tercera División: 1948–49
- Regional Preferente: 1970–71
- Primera B Regional: 1940–41
- Segunda Regional: 1939–40
- Copa Catalunya: Runner-up 1991–92, Runner-up 1998–99

=== Friendly ===
- Nostra Catalunya Trophy: 1974, 1975, 1977, 1981, 1986, 1987, 1990
- Ciutat de Lleida Trophy: 1987, 1992, 1994, 1995, 1997, 2001, 2004, 2006, 2007, 2008

== Records ==
=== Club ===
- Best league performance: 16th, La Liga, 1950–51
- Best cup performance: Last 16 (six times), 1986, 1993, 1995, 1997, 2000, 2005
- Most league points: 68, 2003–04 (three points for a win) 60, 1957–58 (two points for a win)
- Most league goals: 102, 1957–58
- Most league wins in one season: 26, 1957–58
- Best league win home: 9–0 v. Calella, 30 November 1941
- Best league win away: 8–1 v. Europa, 22 February 1942
- Best cup win: 7–0 v. Sant Andreu, 19 December 1985

=== Player ===
- Most league appearances: 460, Miguel Rubio (1982–96)
- Most league goals: 82, Mariano Azcona (1984–91)
- Most league goals in a season: 25, Mariano Azcona (1989–90)
- Most league goals in a match: 5, Mariano Azcona 6–1 v. Fraga, 15 October 1989 and Vallejo 7–1 v. Alavés, 23 May 1965
- Most international appearances: 12, Miguel Mea Vitali (Venezuela) (2000–01)

=== Top goalscorers by season ===
Season	Top scorer	Goals
2011–12	(Spain) Asier Eizaguirre	10
2010–11	(Spain) Rubén Rayos	19
2009–10	(Spain) Marc Sellarés	12
2008–09	(Spain) Mikel Álvaro	13
2007–08	(Spain) Keko	7
2007–08	(Spain) Fernando Esparza	7
2007–08	(Spain) Luismi Gracia	7
2006–07	(Spain) Luis Tevenet	14
2005–06	(Croatia) Mate Bilić	18
2004–05	(Spain) Nakor Bueno	13
2003–04	(Spain) Nakor Bueno	16
2002–03	(Spain) Nano	15
2001/02	(Spain) Raúl Caballero	11
2000–01	(Brazil) Renaldo	8
1999–00	(Spain) Josemi	15
1998–99	(Spain) Josemi	12
1997–98	(Spain) Óscar Arias	8
1997–98	(Spain) Vicente Fernández	8
1996–97	(Spain) Estefan Juliá	8
1995–96	(Spain) Paco Salillas	10
1994–95	(Spain) Paco Salillas	18
1993–94	(Bosnia and Herzegovina) Nikola Milinković	6
1992–93	(Spain) Xabi Gracia	13
1991–92	(Spain) José Emilio Amavisca	14
1990–91	(Uruguay) James Cantero	17
1989–90	(Spain) Mariano Azcona	26
1988–89	(Spain) Mariano Azcona	6
1988–89	(Uruguay) Álvaro Sánchez Pose	6
1987–88	(Spain) Mariano Azcona	13
1986–87	(Spain) Mariano Azcona	16
1986–87	(Spain) Ignacio Alcelay	16
1985–86	(Spain) Mariano Azcona	9
1984–85	(Spain) José María Serna	17
1983–84	(Spain) José García Juárez	10
1982–83	(Spain) Javier Lozano	13
1981–82	(Spain) Ramón Clotet	15
1980–81	(Spain) Luis Alonso	21
1950–51	(Spain) Ignacio Bidegain	8

=== Appearance records ===
La Liga appearances

- (Croatia) Mauro Ravnic: 37
- (Spain) Urbano Ortega: 36
- (France) Virgilio Hernández: 35
- (Spain) Miguel Ángel Rubio: 35
- (Spain) Jaime Quesada: 34
- (Spain) Txema Alonso: 34
- (Spain) Gonzalo Arguiñano: 32
- (Spain) Guillermo Ramón: 28
- (Denmark) Sebastián Herrera: 27
- (Bosnia and Herzegovina) Nikola Milinković: 26

=== Goalscoring records ===
La Liga goals

- (Spain) Ignacio Bidegain: 8
- (Spain) Luis Pellicer: 7
- (Bosnia and Herzegovina) Nikola Milinković: 6
- (Spain) Juan Manuel Martínez: 5
- (Spain) Guillermo Ramón: 5
- (Spain) Francisco Nogués: 4
- (France) Virgilio Hernández: 4

== Selected former players ==
Only international players or UEFA Champions League winners. Flags represent national teams player appeared for.

- (Spain) Tito Vilanova (1997–98)
- (Spain) José Emilio Amavisca (1991–92)
- (Spain) Estanislao Basora (1955–56)
- (Spain) Carles Busquets (1999–2002)
- (Spain) Canito (1975–76)
- (Spain) Enric Gensana (1954–56)
- (Spain) Marià Gonzalvo (1955–56)
- (Spain) Tomás Hernández (1955–56)
- (Spain) Eladio Silvestre (1960–61)
- (Spain) Raúl Tamudo (1999)
- (Spain) Unai Vergara (2005–07)
- (Algeria) Ali Benhalima (1990–93)
- (Brazil) Renaldo (2000–01)
- (Croatia) Mate Bilić (2005–06)
- (Denmark) Søren Andersen (1993–94)
- (North Macedonia) Goran Stanić (1998–2000)
- (Nigeria) Michael Emenalo (1997–98)
- (Paraguay) Carlos González (2000–01)
- (Paraguay) Melanio Olmedo (1956–57)
- (Serbia and Montenegro) Ilija Stolica (1998–00)
- (Soviet Union) (Commonwealth of Independent States) (Russia) Dmitri Kuznetsov (1994–95)
- (Uruguay) Julio Rodríguez (1995–98)
- (Uruguay) Gustavo Matosas (1993–94)
- (United States) Manny Lagos (1991–92)
- (Venezuela) Miguel Mea Vitali (2000–01)
- (Socialist Federal Republic of Yugoslavia) (North Macedonia) Boban Babunski (1994–96)
- (Socialist Federal Republic of Yugoslavia) (Serbia and Montenegro) Jovan Stanković (2004–05)
- (Socialist Federal Republic of Yugoslavia) Mauro Ravnić (1992–94)

== Selected former coaches ==
- (Spain) Mané (1988–95)
- (Spain) Víctor Muñoz (1999–2000)
- (Spain) Juan José Nogués (1954–55)
- (Spain) Juande Ramos (1997–98)
- (Spain) Manuel Ruiz Sosa (1971–72)
- (France) Marcel Domingo (1962–63)
- (Romania) Nicolae Simatoc (1959–60)

== Presidents ==
- (Spain) Sebastià Tàpies: 1939–40
- (Spain) Joan Porta: 1941–47
- (Spain) Eduard Estadella: 1947–51
- (Spain) Llorenç Agustí: 1951–54
- (Spain) Josep Servat: 1954–57
- (Spain) Antoni Rocafort: 1957
- (Spain) Laureà Torres: 1957–60
- (Spain) Antoni Teixidó: 1960–62
- (Spain) Ramon Vilaltella: 1962–67
- (Spain) Josep Jové: 1967–68
- (Spain) Pere Roig: 1968–69
- (Spain) Manel Rosell: 1969–70
- (Spain) Miquel Martínez: 1970–72
- (Spain) Josep Montañola: 1972–74
- (Spain) Lluís Nadal: 1974–77
- (Spain) Josep Esteve: 1977–79
- (Spain) Joan Planes: 1979–82
- (Spain) Antoni Gausí: 1982–86
- (Spain) Màrius Durán: 1986–96
- (Spain) Josep Lluís González: 1996–97
- (Spain) Màrius Durán: 1997–98
- (Spain) Antoni Gausí: 1998–2002
- (Spain) Miquel Pons: 2002–06
- (Spain) Xavier Massana: 2006–07
- (Spain) Ignasi Rivadulla: 2007–10
- (Spain) Anabel Junyent: 2010–11

== See also ==
- List of UE Lleida records and statistics
