= Camp d'Esports =

Stadium in Lleida, Catalonia, Spain

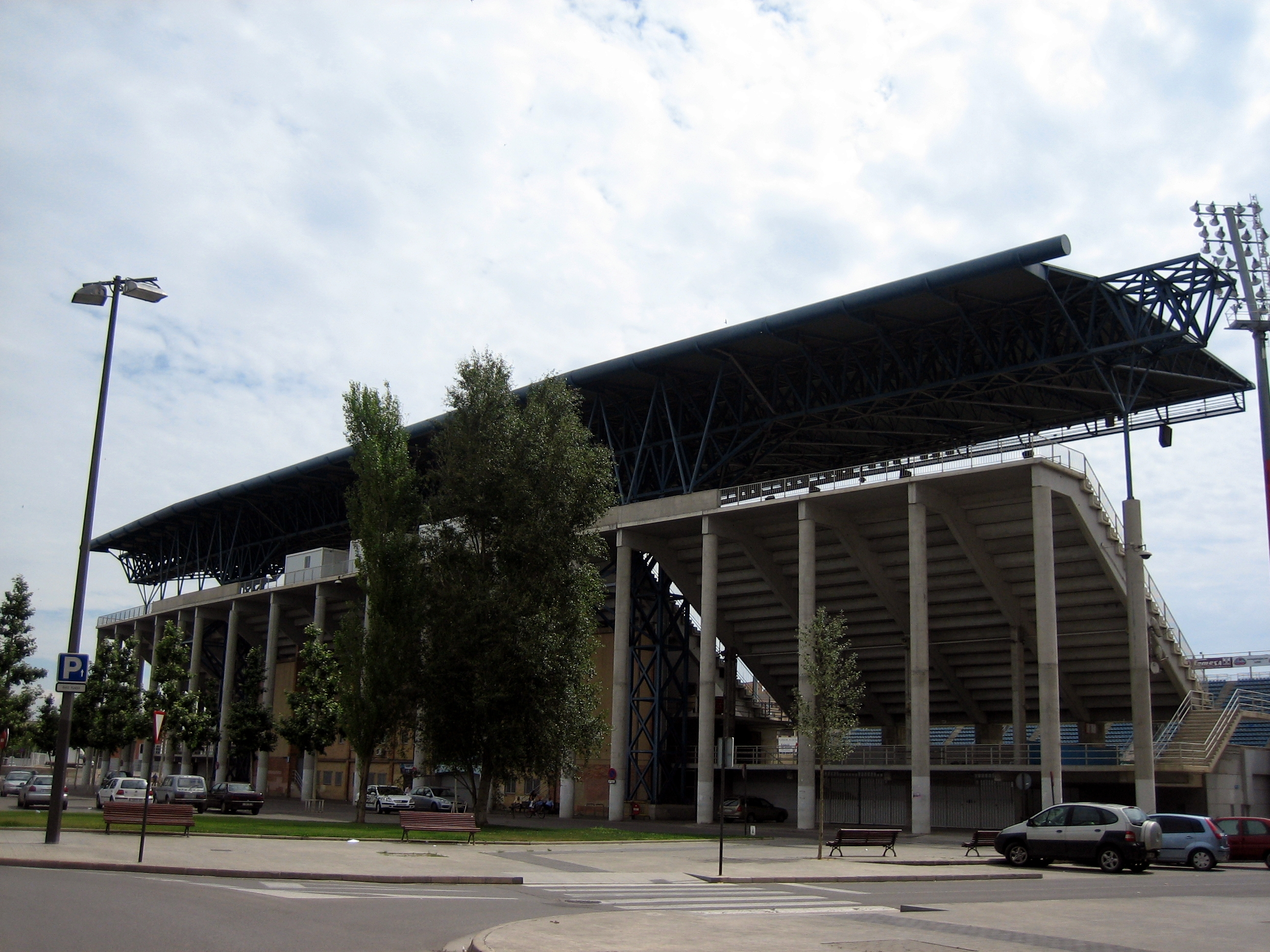
- Interactive map of Camp d'Esports
- Location: Lleida, Catalonia
- Coordinates: 41°37′16.56″N 0°36′50.93″E
- Capacity: 13,500
- Surface: grass
- Field size: 102 x 68 m

Construction
- Groundbreaking: 1918
- Built: 1918
- Renovated: 1993-94
- Architects: 1919 - Adolf Florensa; 1993 - Robert Brufau

Tenants
- Lleida Esportiu; Atlètic Lleida

Camp d'Esports is a multi-use stadium in Lleida, Catalonia. It is currently used mostly for football matches and is the home ground of Lleida Esportiu. The stadium holds 13,500 seats, and the dimensions for the football field are 102x68 meters. The architect responsible for the project was Adrian Florensa.

The construction of the stadium begun in 1918 and finished in 1919. On January 1, 1919, the sports complex named "Camp d'Esports" was officially opened. It underwent extensive renovations in 1993 and 1994.

== League attendances ==
This is a list of league and playoffs games attendances of Lleida Esportiu at Camp d'Esports.

Season	Total	High	Low	Average
2011–12 Segunda División B	27,700	2,300	700	1,539
2012–13 Segunda División B	65,627	10,896	800	3,126
2013–14 Segunda División B	67,042	12,657	857	3,192
2014–15 Segunda División B	39,567	3,000	1,069	1,978

== See also ==
- Pavelló Barris Nord
