= List of CD Logroñés managers =

For main article please see CD Logroñés.

Name	Nationality	Seasons
Manuel Recarte	Spain	1940–1941
Luis Rodríguez	Spain	1941–1943
Gaspar Gurruchaga	Spain	1943–1944
Santín González	Spain	1944–1945
Tomás Rodríguez	Spain	1945–1946
Guillermo Juliac	Spain	1946–1946
Arcadio Arteaga	Spain	1946–1947
Guillermo Juliac	Spain	1947–1948
Tomás Rodríguez	Spain	1948–1948
Jesús Eizaguirre	Spain	1948–1949
Guillermo Gorostiza	Spain	1948–1949
Omist	Spain	1948–1949
Higinio Ortúzar	Spain	1949–1951
Gabriel Andonegui	Spain	1951–1952
Amadeo Navarra	Spain	1952–1953
Gabriel Andonegui	Spain	1952–1953
Peteira	Spain	1953–1954
Luis Rodríguez	Spain	1953–1954
Higinio Ortúzar	Spain	1954–1955
Luis Rodríguez	Spain	1955–1956
Fernando Llorente Sánz	Spain	1955–1956
Gabriel Andonegui	Spain	1955–1956
Luis Aranaz	Spain	1956–1957
Luis Rodríguez	Spain	1956–1957
Vicente Agraz	Spain	1956–1957
Isidoro Lasala	Spain	1957–1959
José María Embil Arana	Spain	1959–1960
Román Galarraga	Spain	1959–1960
Antonio Ibáñez	Spain	1960–1961
Isidoro Lasala	Spain	1960–1961
Norberto Eguren	Spain	1960–1961
Marciano García Arroyo	Spain	1961–1962
Enrique Bescos	Spain	1962–1963
Jaime Porres	Spain	1963–1964
Pedro Torres	Spain	1963–1964
Víctor Arguiñano	Spain	1964–1965
Higinio Ortúzar	Spain	1964–1965
Manuel de Nicolas	Spain	1965–1966
Antoni Ramallets	Spain	1966–1967
Martín Francisco	Spain	1966–1967
Desiderio Herrero	Spain	1966–1967
Enrique Martín Landa	Spain	1967–1968
Manuel Echezarreta	Spain	1967–1968
Marciano García Arroyo	Spain	1967–1968
Amadeo Núñez	Spain	1967–1968
Luis Burgos	Spain	1968–1969
Román Galarraga	Spain	1969–1971
León Lasa	Spain	1971–1972
Carmelo Cedrún	Spain	1972–1973
León Lasa	Spain	1972–1973
Martín Vences	Spain	1973–1974
Juan Arriarán	Spain	1974–1975
Román Galarraga	Spain	1975–1976
Ernesto Garrastachu	Spain	1976–1977
Pedro Arnedo	Spain	1976–1977
Jesús Belaza	Spain	1976–1977
Luis Aloy	Spain	1977–1978
Ernesto Garrastachu	Spain	1978–1979
Juan Arriarán	Spain	1979–1980
José Ramón Fuertes	Spain	1980–1982
Pedro María Uribarri	Spain	1982–1983
Delfín Álvarez	Spain	1983–1985
Koldo Aguirre	Spain	1985–1986
Jesús Aranguren	Spain	1986–1988
Javier Irureta	Spain	1988–1989
Carlos Aimar	Spain	1988–1989
Fernando Ramos	Spain	1988–1989
Miguel Ángel Lotina	Spain	1988–1989
José Luis Romero Robledo	Spain	1989–1990
David Vidal	Spain	1990–1993
Miguel Ángel Lotina	Spain	1993–1994
Carlos Aimar	Spain	1993–1994
Blagoje Paunović	Serbia	1994–1995
Fabricio González	Spain	1994–1995
José Augusto Pinto	Spain	1994–1995
Antonio Ruiz	Spain	1994–1995
Rubén Galilea	Spain	1994–1995
Juande Ramos	Spain	1995–1996
Miguel Ángel Lotina	Spain	1996–1997
Miguel Líber Arispe	Spain	1996–1997
Carlos Aimar	Spain	1996–1997
Víctor Muñoz	Spain	1997–1998
Nacho Martín	Spain	1997–1998
Marco Antonio Boronat	Spain	1998–2000
Rubén Galilea	Spain	2000–2001
Emilio Remírez	Spain	2001–2002
Miguel Ángel Cabezón	Spain	2001–2002
Ico Aguilar	Spain	2002–2003
Juan Carlos Mandiá	Spain	2002–2003
Agustín Abadía	Spain	2002–2003
Juan Señor	Spain	2003–2004
Peio Aguirreoa	Spain	2003–2004
Edu Vílchez	Spain	2004–2005
Janos Beke	Spain	2004–2005
Juan Carlos Herrero	Spain	2005–2007
Quique Setién	Spain	2007–2008
Agustín Abadía	Spain	2007–2008
Eduardo García León	Spain	2008–2009
