= Mario Luna =

Argentine professional footballer and manager

Personal information
- Full name: Mario Benito Luna Sarmiento
- Date of birth: 19 October 1958 (age 68)
- Place of birth: Córdoba, Argentina
- Position: Forward

Senior career*
Years	Team	Apps	(Gls)
1977–1978	Colón		
1978–1980	All Boys		
1980	Washington Diplomats	7	(0)
1981–1982	Real Valladolid	0	(0)
1982–1985	Elche	6	(0)
1982–1983	→ Palencia (loan)	24	(4)
1983–1985	→ Tenerife (loan)	11	(1)
1986–1987	Estudiantes		
1988–1991	Maspalomas	12	(0)
Total		60	(5)

Managerial career
- 1991–1992: Almería (youth)
- 1992–1993: UD Alfacar
- 1993–1994: Granada (assistant)
- 1994–1995: Recreativo Granada
- 1996–1997: Racing Santander (technical assistant)
- 2001: Racing Santander (assistant)
- 2001–2002: Al Khaleej
- 2002–2004: Granada (sporting director)
- 2006: Deportivo Alavés
- 2007: Deportivo Alavés
- 2007–2008: Best International (sporting director)
- 2008–2009: UAG (sporting director)
- 2010–2011: Cerro Reyes
- * Club domestic league appearances and goals

Mario Benito Luna Sarmiento (born 19 October 1958) is an Argentine former footballer who played as a forward, and later worked as a manager. He began his career in his native Argentina, moving abroad to spend the 1980 North American Soccer League season with the Washington Diplomats. The rest of his career was spent with a variety of clubs in Spain and Argentina.

After retiring, he worked as a coach, with his career including stints as manager at Al Khaleej in the United Arab Emirates and Deportivo Alavés in Spain. He has not held a managerial role since leaving Cerro Reyes in 2011.

== Playing career ==
Luna was born in Córdoba, but began his career with Club Atlético Colón in the neighbouring Santa Fe Province in 1977. He moved to fellow Primera División side All Boys in 1978, with whom he endured relegation at the end of the 1980 Metropolitano Championship. He then moved to the United States to join the Washington Diplomats for the 1980 North American Soccer League season, where his teammates included Thomas Rongen and former Dutch international Johan Cruyff. He made seven appearances that season before moving to Spain with La Liga side Real Valladolid.

Despite a fee of 5.5 million pesetas, Luna didn't play a competitive match for Valladolid before signing for Segunda División side Elche in the middle of the 1981–82 season. He stayed at Elche until 1985, but spent the majority of his tenure on loan at fellow second tier sides Palencia (one season) and Tenerife (two seasons). His best season was the 1982–83 campaign, spent with Palencia, in which he played 24 matches and scored four goals. His goals included a fine strike on his debut, which proved to be the only goal of a home win against Rayo Vallecano.

He returned to his homeland in 1986 with Estudiantes, but soon found himself back in Spain when he joined Segunda División B side CD Maspalomas. Maspalomas were relegated after the 1989–90 season, and Luna retired a year later at the age of 32.

== Coaching career ==
Immediately following his retirement, Luna became a youth coach at Almería. His first managerial role was with UD Alfacar in the Primera Regional de Andalusia during the 1992–93 season. For the 1993–94 season he was assistant manager to Nando Yosu at Segunda División B side Granada, and the following season he had a spell as manager of their B team, Recreativo Granada, in the Tercera División. During 1996–97 he was a technical assistant at La Liga side Racing Santander, and he returned to the club in the 2000–01 season, at the end of which they were relegated, as the assistant to Paraguayan manager Gustavo Benítez.

He moved to the United Arab Emirates to become the manager of Al Khaleej for the 2001–02 UAE Football League campaign, in which they finished 11th out of 12 clubs and were relegated. He then returned to Granada as their sporting director, a post he held until 2004. In February 2006, La Liga club Deportivo Alavés dismissed their coach Juan Carlos Oliva after just five games in charge, after chairman Dmitry Piterman accused him of insubordination. Luna took control until the end of the season, making his La Liga coaching debut in a tough away game against Real Madrid at Santiago Bernabéu Stadium, which Alavés lost 3–0.

Luna lead the team to four victories, all at Mendizorrotza, against Sevilla, Celta Vigo, Real Betis and Deportivo La Coruña. However, this was not enough to prevent relegation from the top flight, and Luna was replaced by Julio Bañuelos before the start of the following season. That would prove to be a turbulent campaign for Alavés, with Bañuelos, Chuchi Cos and Fabri González all being sacked as manager by the end of February 2007. After one match with José Garmendia in temporary charge, Luna returned to the club in March to become their fifth coach of the season, but after no wins from his first five games, he resigned after less than a month in charge. Alavés replaced him with Quique Yagüe, their sixth manager of the campaign.

In 2008, Luna moved to Mexico to become sporting director of Primera División side Universidad Autónoma de Guadalajara, a position he held for one year. He returned to management in Spain when third-tier side Cerro Reyes sacked José Luis Diezma in December 2010, with Luna taking over until the end of the season. The club were in crisis, finished bottom of the table, and were relegated to the Regional Preferente de Extremadura as punishment for failing to fulfill all their fixtures and not paying their players. After leaving Cerro Reyes, Luna moved back to the UAE, becoming general manager of the España Sport Academy in Abu Dhabi, a post he has held since 2012.

== Career statistics ==
=== As a player ===
As of 7 May 2021

Club	Season	League			Cup		Total	
Club	Season	Division	Apps	Goals	Apps	Goals	Apps	Goals
United States
Washington Diplomats	1980	NASL	7	0	–		7	0
Spain
Elche	1981–82	Segunda División	6	0	1	0	7	0
Palencia	1982–83	Segunda División	24	4	5	1	29	5
Tenerife	1983–84	Segunda División	11	1	2	1	13	2
CD Maspalomas	1989–90	Segunda División B	12	0	–		12	0
Career total			60	5	8	2	68	7

=== As a manager ===
As of 7 May 2021

Managerial record by team and tenure
Team	Nat	From	To	Record								Ref
Team	Nat	From	To	G	W	D	L	GF	GA	GD	Win %	Ref
Recreativo Granada	(Spain)	1994	1995	12	2	1	9	—	—	—	16.67	
Al Khaleej	(United Arab Emirates)	2001	2002	22	3	9	10	35	61	−26	13.64	
Deportivo Alavés	(Spain)	18 February 2006	13 May 2006	15	4	5	6	11	18	−7	26.67	
Deportivo Alavés	(Spain)	11 March 2007	8 April 2007	5	0	2	3	5	10	−5	0.00	
Cerro Reyes	(Spain)	4 December 2010	23 January 2011	7	1	1	5	5	16	−11	14.29	
Career Total				61	10	18	33	56	105	−49	16.39	—
