= Chuchi Cos =

Spanish football manager and former player (born 1968)

Personal information
- Full name: Jesús Gómez Cos
- Date of birth: 26 October 1968 (age 58)
- Place of birth: Maliaño, Spain
- Height: 1.79 m (5 ft 10 in)
- Position: Forward

Senior career*
Years	Team	Apps	(Gls)
1988–1990	Gimnástica de Torrelavega		
1990–1992	Laredo		
1992–1993	Barakaldo	34	(16)
1993–1995	Xerez	46	(11)
1995–1996	Numancia	7	(0)
1996–1998	Pontevedra	47	(11)
1998–2000	Noja	33	(6)
2000–2001	Tropezón	30	(4)
Total		197	(48)

Managerial career
- 2002–2003: Palamós
- 2003: Racing Santander
- 2004–2006: Deportivo Alavés
- 2006–2007: Deportivo Alavés
- * Club domestic league appearances and goals

Jesús Gómez Cos (born 26 October 1968) is a Spanish football manager and former player.

== Playing career ==
Cos was born in Maliaño in the municipality of Camargo, Cantabria, and began his career with Cantabrian Tercera División side Gimnástica de Torrelavega in 1988. After helping Gimnástica win their Tercera División group in 1989–90, he joined Laredo in the same division for the following season. He stepped up a tier to sign for Barakaldo in Segunda División B in 1992. In his only season with the club, he scored sixteen goals thirty four matches. He went on to play for a succession of clubs in the third tier, spending two seasons with Xerez, one with Numancia and two with Pontevedra before joining newly promoted Noja in 1998. Noja were relegated straight back to the Tercera División after just one season, and Cos stayed at the club until 2000. He added a second Tercera División group win in 1999–2000, before returning to Segunda División B with Tropezón. Tropezón were relegated that season, and Cos retired in 2001 at the age of 32.

== Coaching career ==
After retiring, Cos became a coach at Palamós, managing the newly promoted Segunda División B side from the start of the 2002–03 season. Palamós were owned at the time by Dmitry Piterman, who went on to buy a 24% stake of La Liga club Racing Santander in January 2003. Piterman immediately decided to replace Santander coach Manuel Preciado, bringing in Cos in his place.

Santander avoided relegation that season, but Cos was replaced by Lucas Alcaraz before the 2003–04 campaign. Piterman's next investment was to buy a 51% stake in Segunda División side Deportivo Alavés in July 2004, and he again immediately appointed Cos as manager.

Cos guided Alavés to promotion in his first season in charge, and remained as manager for the first 18 matches of the 2005–06 La Liga campaign. In January, Piterman made Cos director of football, and appointed Juan Carlos Oliva as the new manager. Oliva was fired after just five games for insubordination, with Mario Luna taking over until the end of the season, when Alavés were relegated.

Alavés began the following season with yet another manager, Julio Bañuelos, but he too was sacked just two games into the campaign, with Cos then reappointed as manager. After six wins from seventeen matches, Cos was also fired in January 2007. Alavés went on to have six different managers that season, with Fabri González, José Garmendia, Mario Luna and Quique Yagüe all coaching the team at some stage.

== Career statistics ==
Appearances and goals by club, season and competition
Club	Season	League			Cup		Other		Total	
Club	Season	Division	Apps	Goals	Apps	Goals	Apps	Goals	Apps	Goals
Gimnástica de Torrelavega	1988–89	Tercera División			4	0	–		4	0
Laredo	1990–91	Tercera División			4	0	–		4	0
Barakaldo	1992–93	Segunda División B	34	16	4	2	6 (Note: Appearances in the 1993 Segunda División B play-offs)	3	44	21
Xerez	1993–94	Segunda División B	21	7	2	1	–		23	8
Xerez	1994–95	Segunda División B	25	4	2	1	–		27	5
Xerez	Total		46	11	4	2	0	0	50	13
Numancia	1995–96	Segunda División B	7	0	3	0	–		10	0
Pontevedra	1996–97	Segunda División B	19	7	–		–		19	7
Pontevedra	1997–98	Segunda División B	28	4	–		–		28	4
Pontevedra	Total		47	11	0	0	0	0	47	11
Noja	1998–99	Segunda División B	33	6	2	0	–		35	6
Tropezón	2000–01	Segunda División B	30	4	–		–		30	4
Career total			197	48	21	4	6	3	224	55

== Managerial statistics ==
As of 9 May 2021

Managerial record by team and tenure
Team	Nat	From	To	Record								Ref
Team	Nat	From	To	G	W	D	L	GF	GA	GD	Win %	Ref
Palamós	(Spain)	28 August 2002	19 January 2003	24	10	8	6	38	32	+6	41.67	
Racing Santander	(Spain)	26 January 2003	21 June 2003	20	7	3	10	34	40	−6	35.00	
Deportivo Alavés	(Spain)	29 August 2004	8 January 2006	62	25	14	23	77	78	−1	40.32	
Deportivo Alavés	(Spain)	9 September 2006	7 January 2007	21	8	7	6	20	25	−5	38.10	
Career total				127	50	32	45	169	175	−6	39.37	—

== Honours ==
=== Player ===
Gimnástica de Torrelavega

- Tercera División: 1989–90

Noja

- Tercera División: 1999–2000
