= Juan Carlos Paniagua =

Spanish footballer (born 1966)

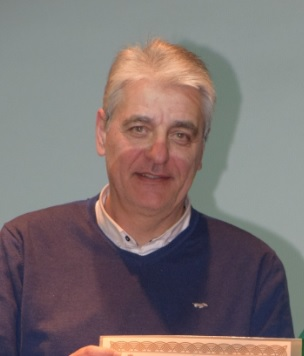
- JC Paniagua

Personal information
- Full name: Juan Carlos Paniagua Prieto
- Date of birth: 20 March 1966 (age 60)
- Place of birth: Navalmoral de la Mata, Spain
- Height: 1.96 m (6 ft 5 in)
- Position: Forward

Youth career
- –1984: Moralo

Senior career*
Years	Team	Apps	(Gls)
1981–1984	Moralo B		
1984–1988	Moralo		
1988–1989	Cacereño		
1989–1991	Extremadura	38	(11)
1991–1994	Toledo	69	(30)
1994–1996	Compostela	27	(2)
1996–1997	Almería	36	(16)
1997	Levante	9	(0)
1998	Cultural Leonesa	7	(0)
1998–2000	Cacereño	41	(4)
2000–2001	Villanovense		
Total		227	(63)

Managerial career
- 2009: Cacereño (assistant)
- * Club domestic league appearances and goals

Juan Carlos Paniagua Prieto (born 20 March 1966) is a Spanish retired footballer who played as a forward, and later worked as a coach.

== Career ==
Paniagua was born in Navalmoral de la Mata in the province of Cáceres, Extremadura, and began his career with local side Moralo. He made his debut for the club's B team in 1981, and stayed with the club until 1988, when he joined fellow Tercera División team Cacereño. After a single season with Cacereño, he signed for Extremadura in 1989, helping the club win their Tercera División group and earn promotion in his first season. He made his Segunda División B debut for the club on 2 September 1990 in a 2–0 away loss to Mérida at Estadio Romano.

He had a strong season, scoring eleven goals, the first of which came in his second match, a 1–1 home draw with Granada on 9 September. However, he left the club that summer to join Toledo, with whom he repeated the feat of winning a Tercera División group and promotion in 1991–92. They earned a second consecutive promotion, via the play-offs, the following season, allowing Paniagua to make his Segunda División debut on 5 September 1993. He replaced Quique for the last 35 minutes of a 2–0 away loss to Badajoz.

He scored fifteen goals that season, opening his account with a brace in a 5–0 home win over Real Murcia at Estadio Salto del Caballo in his second match. His good form earned him a move to newly promoted La Liga side Compostela ahead of the 1994–95 season, and he made his top flight debut on 9 October. He played the first 66 minutes of a 2–1 away win over Celta Vigo at Balaídos before being replaced by Pichi Lucas. He failed to score that season, having to wait until 4 February 1996 for his first top division goal, which came during a substitute appearance in a 2–0 away win over Mérida.

Paniagua left Compostela to join Almería in the Segunda División ahead of the 1996–97 season, at the end of which they were relegated. He spent the first half of the following season with Levante, who ultimately met the same fate as Almería the year before, and then joined Cultural Leonesa in the tier below in the January transfer window. After another half-season, he returned to Cacereño for another two years, suffering relegation from Segunda División B in 1999–2000. He rounded at his career with a single season at Villanovense in the Tercera División, before retiring in 2001 at the age of 35.

== Coaching career ==
In 2009, Paniagua returned to Cacereño, who he had represented twice during his playing career, as assistant manager during Ángel Luis Alcázar's brief spell as head coach.

== Personal life ==
Paniagua's son, Juan Francisco, also played as a forward, and also represented Cacereño, for whom he played during their 2013–14 Segunda División B campaign.

== Honours ==
Extremadura

- Tercera División: 1989–90

Toledo

- Tercera División: 1991–92

== Career statistics ==
As of 12 March 2021

Club	Season	League			Cup		Other		Total	
Club	Season	Division	Apps	Goals	Apps	Goals	Apps	Goals	Apps	Goals
Moralo	1987–88	Tercera División	?	?	1	0	–		1	0
Cacereño	1988–89	Tercera División	?	?	2	0	–		2	0
Extremadura	1990–91	Segunda División B	38	11	4	1	–		42	12
Toledo	1991–92	Tercera División	?	?	1	0	–		1	0
Toledo	1992–93	Segunda División B	33	15	1	0	6	4	40	19
Toledo	1993–94	Segunda División	36	15	3	1	2	1	41	17
Toledo	Total		69	30	5	1	8	5	82	36
Compostela	1994–95	La Liga	12	0	1	1	–		13	1
Compostela	1995–96	La Liga	15	2	4	0	–		19	2
Compostela	Total		27	2	5	1	0	0	32	3
Almería	1996–97	Segunda División	36	16	3	1	–		39	17
Levante	1997–98	Segunda División	9	0	1	0	–		10	0
Cultural Leonesa	1997–98	Segunda División B	7	0	–		3	0	10	0
Cacereño	1998–99	Segunda División B	20	2	0	0	–		20	2
Cacereño	1999–2000	Segunda División B	21	2	–		–		21	2
Cacereño	Total		41	4	0	0	0	0	41	4
Cacereño total			41	4	2	0	0	0	43	4
Career total			227	63	21	4	11	5	259	72

1. Appearances in the 1993 Segunda División B play-offs
2. Appearances in the 1993–94 Segunda División promotion play-off
3. Appearances in the 1998 Segunda División B play-offs
