= 1992–93 Segunda División B =

Segunda División B
- Season: 1992–93
- Champions: Alavés; Las Palmas; Leganés; Murcia
- Promoted: Hércules; Leganés; Murcia; Toledo
- Relegated: Alcalá; Aranjuez; As Pontes; Betis B Elgoibar; Hernani; Horadada; Ibiza; Linense; Llíria; Marino; Orihuela; Portuense; Santurtzi; Sporting Mahonés; Torrevieja; Valdepeñas; Zaragoza B
- Top goalscorer: Eduardo Rodríguez (32 goals)
- Best goalkeeper: José Miguel Robayna (0.46 goals/match)
- Biggest home win: Extremadura 12–0 Portuense (2 May 1993)
- Biggest away win: Horadada 0–6 Cartagena (25 April 1993); Marino 0–6 Recreativo (16 May 1993)
- Highest scoring: Extremadura 12–0 Portuense (2 May 1993)

The 1992–93 Segunda División B season was the 16th since its establishment. The first matches of the season were played on 5 September 1992, and the season ended on 27 June 1993 with the promotion play-off final games.

== Overview before the season ==
80 teams joined the league, including 3 relegated from the 1991–92 Segunda División and 18 promoted from the 1991–92 Tercera División. The composition of the groups was determined by the Royal Spanish Football Federation, attending to geographical criteria.

Relegated from Segunda División

- Murcia
- Avilés
- Las Palmas

Promoted from Tercera División

- Aranjuez
- Racing Ferrol
- Celta Turista
- Alcalá
- Elgoibar
- Beasain
- Andorra
- Izarra
- Valencia B
- Llíria
- Horadada
- Ibiza
- San Roque
- Écija
- Toledo
- Sevilla B
- Mensajero
- Cacereño

== Group 1 ==
Teams from Asturias, Castile and Leon, Castilla–La Mancha, Galicia and Madrid.

=== Teams ===
Location of teams in Segunda División B Gr. 1 1992–93

| Team | Founded | Home city | Stadium |
|---|---|---|---|
| Alcalá | 1929 | Alcalá de Henares, Madrid | El Val |
| Aranjuez | 1948 | Aranjuez, Madrid | Municipal de Deportes |
| As Pontes | 1960 | As Pontes, Galicia | O Poboado |
| Atlético Madrid B | 1969 | Madrid, Madrid | Vicente Calderón |
| Real Ávila | 1923 | Ávila, Castile and Leon | Adolfo Suárez |
| Real Avilés Industrial | 1903 | Avilés, Asturias | Román Sánchez Puerta |
| Celta Turista | 1927 | Vigo, Galicia | Barreiro |
| Cultural Leonesa | 1923 | León, Castile and Leon | Antonio Amilvia |
| Getafe | 1983 | Getafe, Madrid | Las Margaritas |
| Leganés | 1928 | Leganés, Madrid | Luis Rodríguez de Miguel |
| Orense | 1952 | Ourense, Galicia | O Couto |
| Real Oviedo B | 1930 | Oviedo, Asturias | Carlos Tartiere |
| Ponferradina | 1922 | Ponferrada, Castile and Leon | Fuentesnuevas |
| Pontevedra | 1941 | Pontevedra, Galicia | Pasarón |
| Racing Ferrol | 1919 | Ferrol, Galicia | Manuel Rivera |
| Salamanca | 1923 | Salamanca, Castile and Leon | Helmántico |
| Sporting Gijón B | 1960 | Gijón, Asturias | Mareo |
| Toledo | 1928 | Toledo, Castilla–La Mancha | Salto del Caballo |
| Tomelloso | 1979 | Tomelloso, Castilla–La Mancha | Municipal |
| Valdepeñas | 1956 | Valdepeñas, Castilla–La Mancha | La Molineta |

=== League table ===
| Pos | Team | Pld | W | D | L | GF | GA | GD | Pts | Qualification or relegation |
|---|---|---|---|---|---|---|---|---|---|---|
| 1 | Leganés (P) | 38 | 21 | 10 | 7 | 59 | 31 | +28 | 52 (Note: Leganés finished ahead of Salamanca on overall goal difference) | Qualification for the promotion playoffs |
| 2 | Salamanca | 38 | 21 | 10 | 7 | 64 | 40 | +24 | 52 | Qualification for the promotion playoffs |
| 3 | Toledo (P) | 38 | 19 | 13 | 6 | 62 | 26 | +36 | 51 | Qualification for the promotion playoffs |
| 4 | Getafe | 38 | 15 | 17 | 6 | 42 | 28 | +14 | 47 | Qualification for the promotion playoffs |
| 5 | Ourense | 38 | 15 | 15 | 8 | 39 | 28 | +11 | 45 | |
| 6 | Avilés | 38 | 16 | 10 | 12 | 43 | 37 | +6 | 42 | |
| 7 | Atlético Madrid B | 38 | 12 | 16 | 10 | 53 | 44 | +9 | 40 (Note: Atlético Madrid B finished ahead of Ponferradina on head-to-head points: Ponferradina–Atlético Madrid B 1–2, Atlético Madrid B–Ponferradina 3–0) | |
| 8 | Ponferradina | 38 | 15 | 10 | 13 | 48 | 44 | +4 | 40 | |
| 9 | Oviedo B | 38 | 13 | 11 | 14 | 41 | 43 | −2 | 37 | |
| 10 | Cultural Leonesa | 38 | 12 | 12 | 14 | 32 | 39 | −7 | 36 (Note: Cultural Leonesa finished ahead of Ávila and Racing Ferrol on head-to-head points: Cultural Leonesa 8 pts, Ávila 2 pts, Racing Ferrol 2 pts. Ávila finished ahead of Racing Ferrol on head-to-head goal difference: Racing Ferrol–Ávila 2–1, Ávila–Racing Ferrol 3–1) | |
| 11 | Ávila | 38 | 12 | 12 | 14 | 37 | 37 | 0 | 36 | |
| 12 | Racing Ferrol | 38 | 13 | 10 | 15 | 56 | 47 | +9 | 36 | |
| 13 | Pontevedra | 38 | 12 | 10 | 16 | 36 | 45 | −9 | 34 (Note: Pontevedra finished ahead of Sporting Gijón B on overall goal difference) | |
| 14 | Sporting Gijón B | 38 | 12 | 10 | 16 | 40 | 52 | −12 | 34 | |
| 15 | Celta Turista | 38 | 10 | 13 | 15 | 37 | 47 | −10 | 33 | |
| 16 | Tomelloso | 38 | 9 | 14 | 15 | 39 | 48 | −9 | 32 (Note: Tomelloso finished ahead of As Pontes on head-to-head points: As Pontes–Tomelloso 3–3, Tomelloso–As Pontes 2–0) | |
| 17 | As Pontes | 38 | 9 | 14 | 15 | 33 | 49 | −16 | 32 | Relegation to Tercera División |
| 18 | Valdepeñas | 38 | 10 | 10 | 18 | 31 | 56 | −25 | 30 | Relegation to Tercera División |
| 19 | Aranjuez | 38 | 10 | 8 | 20 | 35 | 51 | −16 | 28 | Relegation to Tercera División |
| 20 | Alcalá | 38 | 7 | 9 | 22 | 34 | 69 | −35 | 23 | Relegation to Tercera División |

Source: BDFútbol
Rules for classification: 1) points; 2) head-to-head points; 3) head-to-head goal difference; 4) goal difference; 5) number of goals scored
(P) Promoted

=== Results ===
| Home \ Away | ALC | ARA | ASP | ATL | AVA | AVS | CEL | CUL | GET | LEG | ORE | OVI | PNF | PNT | RFE | SAL | SPG | TOL | TOM | VDP |
|---|---|---|---|---|---|---|---|---|---|---|---|---|---|---|---|---|---|---|---|---|
| Alcalá | — | 1–0 | 1–0 | 2–2 | 0–2 | 3–1 | 1–1 | 0–0 | 0–1 | 0–2 | 0–1 | 0–0 | 1–2 | 1–2 | 0–3 | 0–3 | 0–1 | 3–2 | 2–2 | 1–2 |
| Aranjuez | 3–2 | — | 0–1 | 0–1 | 1–2 | 3–2 | 3–1 | 2–0 | 3–1 | 2–1 | 0–0 | 2–0 | 0–1 | 1–0 | 1–6 | 2–3 | 1–1 | 0–1 | 2–1 | 3–2 |
| As Pontes | 0–0 | 2–0 | — | 1–1 | 0–0 | 0–1 | 0–1 | 3–1 | 0–0 | 1–0 | 0–0 | 2–1 | 1–0 | 2–0 | 3–0 | 2–2 | 0–0 | 0–0 | 3–3 | 1–1 |
| Atlético Madrid B | 4–1 | 3–2 | 0–0 | — | 1–1 | 2–0 | 1–1 | 1–1 | 1–1 | 1–2 | 0–0 | 1–3 | 3–0 | 5–1 | 3–1 | 0–1 | 1–2 | 0–4 | 1–1 | 4–0 |
| Real Ávila | 2–0 | 0–0 | 3–1 | 0–0 | — | 2–0 | 3–1 | 0–1 | 0–0 | 1–2 | 0–0 | 0–1 | 2–2 | 2–0 | 3–1 | 1–1 | 1–0 | 0–1 | 2–0 | 1–3 |
| Real Avilés Ind. | 3–0 | 3–0 | 0–0 | 2–1 | 3–1 | — | 1–1 | 1–0 | 1–0 | 0–0 | 1–0 | 3–1 | 0–4 | 2–2 | 3–1 | 1–2 | 3–0 | 0–0 | 1–0 | 3–2 |
| Celta Turista | 4–0 | 1–0 | 4–0 | 1–1 | 1–2 | 3–0 | — | 0–0 | 0–0 | 1–1 | 1–2 | 2–1 | 2–0 | 0–1 | 1–1 | 2–1 | 0–2 | 1–2 | 2–0 | 1–0 |
| Cultural Leonesa | 2–0 | 2–0 | 2–1 | 1–1 | 1–0 | 0–2 | 1–1 | — | 1–1 | 1–1 | 1–1 | 1–0 | 0–3 | 0–1 | 2–1 | 1–1 | 1–3 | 2–1 | 0–1 | 1–0 |
| Getafe | 4–3 | 1–0 | 5–2 | 0–0 | 4–1 | 1–0 | 2–0 | 1–0 | — | 3–2 | 0–0 | 0–1 | 1–1 | 0–0 | 1–0 | 2–1 | 2–0 | 0–2 | 0–0 | 2–0 |
| Leganés | 1–1 | 1–0 | 4–1 | 1–0 | 0–0 | 2–1 | 5–0 | 2–1 | 2–2 | — | 0–0 | 3–1 | 2–1 | 2–0 | 2–2 | 2–0 | 3–0 | 2–0 | 2–1 | 3–0 |
| Orense | 0–1 | 1–0 | 3–0 | 1–1 | 1–0 | 0–0 | 3–2 | 0–0 | 0–2 | 1–0 | — | 1–0 | 2–1 | 2–0 | 2–0 | 2–1 | 2–1 | 0–1 | 1–1 | 4–1 |
| Real Oviedo B | 1–1 | 0–0 | 2–1 | 0–2 | 2–0 | 0–0 | 2–0 | 2–1 | 0–0 | 0–1 | 1–1 | — | 2–1 | 2–0 | 1–1 | 2–3 | 3–1 | 1–1 | 0–0 | 0–0 |
| Ponferradina | 0–0 | 2–0 | 1–1 | 1–2 | 1–1 | 1–1 | 3–0 | 0–0 | 2–0 | 1–1 | 1–0 | 3–0 | — | 2–3 | 1–0 | 0–1 | 2–0 | 1–1 | 2–1 | 2–1 |
| Pontevedra | 3–1 | 2–0 | 2–0 | 0–2 | 0–0 | 1–0 | 0–0 | 1–2 | 1–0 | 1–2 | 2–0 | 1–2 | 1–2 | — | 1–2 | 0–0 | 2–2 | 2–2 | 2–1 | 2–1 |
| Racing Ferrol | 3–0 | 1–1 | 2–0 | 3–2 | 2–1 | 1–2 | 2–0 | 0–1 | 0–0 | 1–1 | 1–1 | 6–2 | 0–1 | 1–0 | — | 1–1 | 2–0 | 0–1 | 5–1 | 0–1 |
| Salamanca | 2–3 | 1–0 | 2–0 | 1–1 | 1–0 | 0–0 | 4–0 | 2–0 | 1–1 | 3–1 | 2–1 | 1–1 | 2–0 | 1–0 | 3–2 | — | 3–1 | 1–0 | 6–1 | 0–0 |
| Sporting Gijón B | 3–0 | 0–0 | 2–4 | 3–1 | 0–2 | 2–1 | 0–0 | 0–0 | 1–1 | 0–1 | 0–2 | 1–0 | 2–2 | 0–0 | 2–1 | 3–2 | — | 2–1 | 1–1 | 4–0 |
| Toledo | 2–1 | 3–3 | 3–0 | 4–0 | 3–0 | 0–0 | 1–0 | 4–0 | 1–1 | 2–1 | 1–1 | 0–1 | 4–0 | 1–1 | 1–1 | 5–0 | 4–0 | — | 1–0 | 2–1 |
| Tomelloso | 5–0 | 0–0 | 2–0 | 0–0 | 1–0 | 1–0 | 1–1 | 1–0 | 1–2 | 0–1 | 2–2 | 0–4 | 5–1 | 0–0 | 0–1 | 1–2 | 2–0 | 0–0 | — | 1–0 |
| Valdepeñas | 0–4 | 1–0 | 0–0 | 1–3 | 1–1 | 0–1 | 0–0 | 0–4 | 0–0 | 1–0 | 3–1 | 2–1 | 1–0 | 2–1 | 1–1 | 1–3 | 1–0 | 0–0 | 1–1 | — |

Source: BDFútbol
Legend: Blue = home team win; Yellow = draw; Red = away team win.

=== Top goalscorers ===
| Goalscorers | Goals | Team |
|---|---|---|
| (Spain) Pazolo | 21 | Racing Ferrol |
| (Spain) Antonio Acosta | 19 | Atlético Madrid B |
| (Spain) Miguel Peces | 16 | Leganés |
| (Spain) Juan Carlos Paniagua | 15 | Toledo |
| (Spain) Manolo Santiago | 15 | Ponferradina |

=== Top goalkeepers ===
| Goalkeeper | Goals | Matches | Average | Team |
|---|---|---|---|---|
| (Spain) Jacinto Villalvilla | 25 | 38 | 0.66 | Toledo |
| (Spain) Javier Aguilera | 25 | 34 | 0.74 | Leganés |
| (Spain) Manuel Ares | 28 | 38 | 0.74 | Ourense |
| (Spain) Juan Carlos Arévalo | 26 | 31 | 0.84 | Getafe |
| (Spain) Javier Delgado | 29 | 33 | 0.88 | Ponferradina |

== Group 2 ==
Teams from Andorra, Aragon, Basque Country, Cantabria, Castile and Leon, La Rioja and Navarre.

=== Teams ===
Location of teams in Segunda División B Gr. 2 1992–93

| Team | Founded | Home city | Stadium |
|---|---|---|---|
| Alavés | 1921 | Vitoria-Gasteiz, Basque Country | Mendizorroza |
| Andorra CF | 1957 | Andorra, Aragon | Juan Antonio Endeiza |
| FC Andorra | 1942 | Andorra la Vella, Andorra | Comunal |
| Barakaldo | 1917 | Barakaldo, Basque Country | Lasesarre |
| Basconia | 1913 | Basauri, Basque Country | Basozelai |
| Beasain | 1905 | Beasain, Basque Country | Loinaz |
| Elgoibar | 1917 | Elgoibar, Basque Country | Mintxeta |
| Gimnástica de Torrelavega | 1907 | Torrelavega, Cantabria | El Malecón |
| Hernani | 1940 | Hernani, Basque Country | Zubipe |
| Izarra | 1924 | Estella-Lizarra, Navarre | Merkatondoa |
| Lemona | 1923 | Lemoa, Basque Country | Arlonagusia |
| Logroñés B | 1950 | Logroño, La Rioja | Las Gaunas |
| Numancia | 1945 | Soria, Castile and León | Los Pajaritos |
| Osasuna B | 1962 | Aranguren, Navarre | Tajonar |
| Palencia | 1975 | Palencia, Castile and León | La Balastera |
| Real Sociedad B | 1951 | San Sebastián, Basque Country | Atotxa |
| Santurtzi | 1952 | Santurtzi, Basque Country | San Jorge |
| Tudelano | 1935 | Tudela, Navarre | José Antonio Elola |
| Valladolid B | 1942 | Valladolid, Castile and León | Anexo José Zorrilla |
| Zaragoza B | 1958 | Zaragoza, Aragon | Ciudad Deportiva del Real Zaragoza |

=== League table ===
| Pos | Team | Pld | W | D | L | GF | GA | GD | Pts | Qualification or relegation |
|---|---|---|---|---|---|---|---|---|---|---|
| 1 | Alavés | 38 | 23 | 6 | 9 | 62 | 30 | +32 | 52 | Qualification for the promotion playoffs |
| 2 | Barakaldo | 38 | 13 | 19 | 6 | 54 | 29 | +25 | 45 (Note: Barakaldo finished ahead of Gimnástica Torrelavega and Palencia on head-to-head points: Barakaldo 6 pts, Gimnástica Torrelavega 5 pts, Palencia 1 pt) | Qualification for the promotion playoffs |
| 3 | Gimnástica Torrelavega | 38 | 16 | 13 | 9 | 35 | 30 | +5 | 45 | Qualification for the promotion playoffs |
| 4 | Palencia | 38 | 17 | 11 | 10 | 51 | 44 | +7 | 45 | Qualification for the promotion playoffs |
| 5 | Osasuna B | 38 | 16 | 12 | 10 | 37 | 31 | +6 | 44 (Note: Osasuna B finished ahead of Izarra on head-to-head points: Osasuna B–Izarra 1–0, Izarra–Osasuna B 0–0) | |
| 6 | Izarra | 38 | 14 | 16 | 8 | 40 | 36 | +4 | 44 | |
| 7 | Baskonia | 38 | 16 | 11 | 11 | 52 | 35 | +17 | 43 | |
| 8 | Numancia | 38 | 16 | 10 | 12 | 51 | 41 | +10 | 42 | |
| 9 | Real Sociedad B | 38 | 12 | 14 | 12 | 49 | 39 | +10 | 38 | |
| 10 | FC Andorra | 38 | 13 | 11 | 14 | 47 | 41 | +6 | 37 | |
| 11 | Valladolid B | 38 | 11 | 14 | 13 | 42 | 53 | −11 | 36 (Note: Valladolid B finished ahead of Logroñés B on head-to-head points: Logroñés B–Valladolid B 0–0, Valladolid B–Logroñés B 2–1) | |
| 12 | Logroñés B | 38 | 12 | 12 | 14 | 34 | 40 | −6 | 36 | |
| 13 | Beasain | 38 | 9 | 16 | 13 | 38 | 48 | −10 | 34 (Note: Beasain finished ahead of Lemona on head-to-head points: Lemona–Beasain 1–2, Beasain–Lemona 3–1) | |
| 14 | Lemona | 38 | 10 | 14 | 14 | 32 | 34 | −2 | 34 | |
| 15 | Andorra | 38 | 10 | 13 | 15 | 39 | 53 | −14 | 33 (Note: Andorra finished ahead of Tudelano on head-to-head points: Tudelano–Andorra 0–0, Andorra–Tudelano 5–2) | |
| 16 | Tudelano | 38 | 8 | 17 | 13 | 31 | 44 | −13 | 33 | |
| 17 | Hernani | 38 | 9 | 14 | 15 | 39 | 50 | −11 | 32 (Note: Hernani finished ahead of Zaragoza B on head-to-head points: Zaragoza B–Hernani 1–3, Hernani–Zaragoza B 1–0) | Relegation to Tercera División |
| 18 | Zaragoza B | 38 | 10 | 12 | 16 | 35 | 51 | −16 | 32 | Relegation to Tercera División |
| 19 | Elgoibar | 38 | 9 | 10 | 19 | 30 | 52 | −22 | 28 | Relegation to Tercera División |
| 20 | Santurtzi | 38 | 7 | 13 | 18 | 25 | 42 | −17 | 27 | Relegation to Tercera División |

Source: BDFútbol
Rules for classification: 1) points; 2) head-to-head points; 3) head-to-head goal difference; 4) goal difference; 5) number of goals scored

=== Results ===
| Home \ Away | ALV | AND | FCA | BAR | BAS | BEA | ELG | GIM | HER | IZA | LEM | LOG | NUM | OSA | PAL | RSO | SAN | TUD | VLD | ZAR |
|---|---|---|---|---|---|---|---|---|---|---|---|---|---|---|---|---|---|---|---|---|
| Alavés | — | 1–0 | 2–0 | 0–1 | 3–1 | 0–2 | 3–0 | 0–0 | 1–2 | 1–1 | 1–0 | 2–0 | 2–1 | 4–1 | 2–0 | 1–0 | 5–0 | 4–0 | 1–1 | 1–0 |
| Andorra | 1–1 | — | 3–2 | 0–0 | 0–2 | 1–1 | 2–1 | 2–0 | 3–1 | 0–0 | 1–1 | 0–0 | 0–3 | 1–4 | 0–1 | 1–2 | 2–0 | 5–2 | 3–2 | 2–0 |
| FC Andorra | 3–0 | 2–0 | — | 0–3 | 3–0 | 3–0 | 0–0 | 0–2 | 3–1 | 1–1 | 0–0 | 3–0 | 1–2 | 1–1 | 0–0 | 2–1 | 0–0 | 1–1 | 3–0 | 3–1 |
| Barakaldo | 0–0 | 3–0 | 2–0 | — | 3–0 | 3–3 | 0–0 | 3–0 | 1–1 | 2–2 | 1–1 | 1–0 | 0–1 | 7–1 | 4–0 | 2–0 | 0–0 | 4–1 | 0–0 | 0–1 |
| Basconia | 2–1 | 1–1 | 0–0 | 2–0 | — | 3–0 | 4–1 | 1–1 | 2–1 | 0–0 | 0–2 | 0–1 | 0–1 | 0–0 | 6–1 | 1–1 | 2–0 | 1–0 | 8–1 | 2–0 |
| Beasain | 0–1 | 1–0 | 0–0 | 2–3 | 0–2 | — | 1–1 | 0–1 | 1–1 | 3–1 | 3–1 | 2–1 | 1–1 | 0–2 | 1–0 | 1–1 | 2–1 | 0–1 | 1–1 | 0–1 |
| Elgoibar | 0–4 | 3–0 | 2–0 | 0–0 | 0–1 | 2–2 | — | 0–0 | 0–0 | 1–2 | 1–0 | 0–0 | 0–2 | 0–3 | 2–1 | 1–2 | 2–0 | 1–0 | 2–0 | 3–0 |
| Gimn. Torrelavega | 2–1 | 2–0 | 2–1 | 2–1 | 0–0 | 1–0 | 2–1 | — | 2–1 | 0–1 | 0–0 | 1–2 | 1–0 | 2–1 | 1–1 | 1–0 | 0–0 | 1–0 | 1–1 | 4–0 |
| Hernani | 1–4 | 0–1 | 1–1 | 1–1 | 1–0 | 2–2 | 1–0 | 2–0 | — | 1–3 | 0–0 | 1–1 | 2–1 | 0–0 | 1–1 | 0–0 | 0–0 | 3–0 | 1–2 | 1–0 |
| Izarra | 0–1 | 3–1 | 4–2 | 2–2 | 1–1 | 1–1 | 1–0 | 3–1 | 2–1 | — | 2–1 | 2–0 | 1–0 | 0–0 | 0–0 | 2–2 | 2–1 | 0–0 | 1–0 | 0–0 |
| Lemona | 0–1 | 0–0 | 2–0 | 1–0 | 1–3 | 1–2 | 0–1 | 2–0 | 1–1 | 1–0 | — | 0–2 | 0–1 | 0–1 | 1–1 | 0–0 | 1–0 | 1–0 | 1–2 | 3–1 |
| Logroñés B | 0–3 | 1–0 | 1–2 | 0–0 | 1–1 | 0–0 | 4–1 | 0–0 | 3–0 | 0–0 | 2–4 | — | 2–1 | 1–3 | 1–2 | 1–0 | 2–0 | 0–0 | 0–0 | 1–1 |
| Numancia | 2–2 | 3–3 | 0–1 | 2–2 | 1–1 | 0–1 | 4–1 | 0–0 | 2–1 | 0–1 | 1–0 | 1–0 | — | 1–0 | 1–1 | 2–1 | 2–0 | 2–2 | 3–1 | 0–0 |
| Osasuna B | 0–1 | 0–0 | 1–0 | 3–1 | 0–0 | 1–0 | 4–1 | 0–1 | 0–2 | 1–0 | 0–1 | 1–1 | 2–1 | — | 0–2 | 0–0 | 1–0 | 0–0 | 1–0 | 0–0 |
| Palencia | 3–2 | 2–2 | 2–1 | 0–1 | 3–2 | 3–0 | 1–0 | 0–1 | 1–0 | 3–0 | 2–2 | 0–1 | 3–2 | 1–1 | — | 2–1 | 2–0 | 0–0 | 1–0 | 5–2 |
| Real Sociedad B | 0–1 | 0–0 | 2–1 | 0–0 | 0–1 | 2–2 | 0–0 | 1–0 | 4–2 | 4–0 | 1–0 | 0–1 | 4–1 | 0–1 | 2–2 | — | 4–0 | 3–0 | 2–2 | 3–2 |
| Santurtzi | 1–2 | 4–0 | 0–2 | 1–1 | 0–1 | 0–0 | 5–1 | 0–0 | 1–0 | 2–0 | 2–2 | 2–1 | 0–0 | 0–1 | 0–1 | 1–1 | — | 0–0 | 1–2 | 2–0 |
| Tudelano | 2–1 | 0–0 | 1–1 | 1–1 | 3–0 | 2–0 | 0–0 | 0–0 | 1–1 | 0–0 | 0–0 | 1–2 | 2–5 | 2–1 | 3–1 | 2–0 | 0–1 | — | 0–1 | 2–1 |
| Valladolid B | 0–1 | 4–3 | 1–3 | 1–1 | 2–1 | 1–1 | 1–0 | 3–1 | 4–1 | 1–0 | 1–1 | 2–1 | 0–1 | 0–0 | 0–2 | 2–2 | 0–0 | 1–1 | — | 1–1 |
| Zaragoza B | 3–1 | 0–1 | 2–1 | 0–0 | 1–0 | 2–2 | 2–1 | 2–2 | 1–3 | 1–1 | 0–0 | 3–0 | 2–0 | 0–1 | 1–0 | 1–3 | 0–0 | 1–1 | 2–1 | — |

Source: BDFútbol
Legend: Blue = home team win; Yellow = draw; Red = away team win.

=== Top goalscorers ===
| Goalscorers | Goals | Team |
|---|---|---|
| (Spain) Santi Castillejo | 20 | Osasuna B |
| (Spain) Iosu Argoitia | 17 | Baskonia |
| (Spain) Chuchi Cos | 16 | Barakaldo |
| (Spain) Juanjo Rodríguez | 15 | Palencia |
| (Spain) Iñaki Moreno | 13 | Barakaldo |

=== Top goalkeepers ===
| Goalkeeper | Goals | Matches | Average | Team |
|---|---|---|---|---|
| (Spain) Alfonso Núñez | 24 | 32 | 0.75 | Alavés |
| (Spain) Carlos Castilla | 24 | 32 | 0.75 | Barakaldo |
| (Spain) Agapito Moncaleán | 28 | 37 | 0.76 | Gimnástica Torrelavega |
| (Spain) Javier López Vallejo | 30 | 35 | 0.86 | Osasuna B |
| (Spain) Juan Antonio Tinoko | 34 | 38 | 0.89 | Lemona |

== Group 3 ==
Teams from Balearic Islands, Catalonia, Region of Murcia and Valencian Community.

=== Teams ===
Location of teams in Segunda División B Gr. 3 1992–93

| Team | Founded | Home city | Stadium |
|---|---|---|---|
| Alcoyano | 1928 | Alcoy, Valencian Community | El Collao |
| Benidorm | 1964 | Benidorm, Valencian Community | Foietes |
| Cartagena FC | 1940 | Cartagena, Region of Murcia | Cartagonova |
| Elche | 1923 | Elche, Valencian Community | Martínez Valero |
| Gimnàstic de Tarragona | 1886 | Tarragona, Catalonia | Nou Estadi Tarragona |
| Girona | 1930 | Girona, Catalonia | Montilivi |
| Hércules | 1922 | Alicante, Valencian Community | José Rico Pérez |
| Horadada | 1972 | Pilar de la Horadada, Valencian Community | Ikomar |
| Hospitalet | 1957 | L'Hospitalet de Llobregat, Catalonia | Municipal de Deportes |
| Ibiza | 1995 | Ibiza, Balearic Islands | Can Misses |
| Levante | 1909 | Valencia, Valencian Community | Nou Estadi Llevant |
| Llíria | N/A | Llíria, Valencian Community | El Cano |
| Sporting Mahonés | 1974 | Mahón, Balearic Islands | Bintaufa |
| Manlleu | 1933 | Manlleu, Catalonia | Municipal |
| Murcia | 1919 | Murcia, Region of Murcia | La Condomina |
| Orihuela | 1944 | Orihuela, Valencian Community | Los Arcos |
| Sant Andreu | 1909 | Barcelona, Catalonia | Narcís Sala |
| Torrevieja | 1971 | Torrevieja, Valencian Community | Vicente García |
| Valencia B | 1944 | Valencia, Valencian Community | Ciudad Deportiva de Paterna |
| Yeclano | 1950 | Yecla, Region of Murcia | La Constitución |

=== League table ===
| Pos | Team | Pld | W | D | L | GF | GA | GD | Pts | Qualification or relegation |
|---|---|---|---|---|---|---|---|---|---|---|
| 1 | Murcia (P) | 38 | 23 | 7 | 8 | 62 | 34 | +28 | 53 (Note: Murcia finished ahead of Sant Andreu on head-to-head goal difference: Murcia–Sant Andreu 4–2, Sant Andreu–Murcia 2–1) | Qualification for the promotion playoffs |
| 2 | Sant Andreu | 38 | 24 | 5 | 9 | 84 | 43 | +41 | 53 | Qualification for the promotion playoffs |
| 3 | Elche | 38 | 21 | 10 | 7 | 62 | 34 | +28 | 52 | Qualification for the promotion playoffs |
| 4 | Hércules (P) | 38 | 20 | 10 | 8 | 71 | 38 | +33 | 50 | Qualification for the promotion playoffs |
| 5 | Cartagena | 38 | 19 | 10 | 9 | 56 | 31 | +25 | 48 | |
| 6 | Yeclano | 38 | 18 | 10 | 10 | 49 | 29 | +20 | 46 | |
| 7 | L'Hospitalet | 38 | 17 | 6 | 15 | 54 | 44 | +10 | 40 (Note: L'Hospitalet finished ahead of Benidorm on head-to-head points: Benidorm–L'Hospitalet 1–5, L'Hospitalet–Benidorm 3–0) | |
| 8 | Benidorm | 38 | 15 | 10 | 13 | 38 | 45 | −7 | 40 | |
| 9 | Levante | 38 | 16 | 7 | 15 | 63 | 57 | +6 | 39 | |
| 10 | Gimnàstic | 38 | 14 | 9 | 15 | 43 | 54 | −11 | 37 (Note: Gimnàstic finished ahead of Ibiza on head-to-head points: Ibiza–Gimnàstic 0–0, Gimnàstic–Ibiza 1–0) | |
| 11 | Ibiza (Note: Ibiza was relegated to Tercera División due to financial problems) | 38 | 10 | 17 | 11 | 46 | 42 | +4 | 37 | Relegation to Tercera División |
| 12 | Valencia B | 38 | 14 | 8 | 16 | 54 | 57 | −3 | 36 | |
| 13 | Manlleu | 38 | 12 | 9 | 17 | 46 | 45 | +1 | 33 (Note: Manlleu finished ahead of Alcoyano on overall goal difference) | |
| 14 | Alcoyano | 38 | 12 | 9 | 17 | 45 | 57 | −12 | 33 | |
| 15 | Girona | 38 | 10 | 12 | 16 | 36 | 50 | −14 | 32 | |
| 16 | Torrevieja | 38 | 12 | 7 | 19 | 33 | 57 | −24 | 31 | Relegation to Tercera División |
| 17 | Orihuela | 38 | 10 | 8 | 20 | 32 | 53 | −21 | 28 (Note: Orihuela finished ahead of Llíria on head-to-head goal difference: Llíria–Orihuela 2–1, Orihuela–Llíria 2–0) | Relegation to Tercera División |
| 18 | Llíria | 38 | 9 | 10 | 19 | 41 | 74 | −33 | 28 | Relegation to Tercera División |
| 19 | Sporting Mahonés | 38 | 8 | 9 | 21 | 35 | 65 | −30 | 25 | Relegation to Tercera División |
| 20 | Horadada | 38 | 6 | 7 | 25 | 28 | 69 | −41 | 19 | Relegation to Tercera División |

Source: BDFútbol
Rules for classification: 1) points; 2) head-to-head points; 3) head-to-head goal difference; 4) goal difference; 5) number of goals scored
(P) Promoted

=== Results ===
| Home \ Away | ALC | BEN | CAR | ELC | GIM | GIR | HER | HOR | HOS | IBI | LEV | LLI | MAH | MAN | MUR | ORI | SAN | TOR | VAL | YEC |
|---|---|---|---|---|---|---|---|---|---|---|---|---|---|---|---|---|---|---|---|---|
| Alcoyano | — | 1–1 | 1–3 | 2–1 | 0–1 | 3–1 | 2–2 | 2–0 | 0–0 | 1–2 | 2–1 | 2–3 | 0–2 | 3–0 | 2–0 | 0–0 | 0–1 | 2–1 | 3–1 | 1–0 |
| Benidorm | 1–1 | — | 1–1 | 2–3 | 2–0 | 2–0 | 0–0 | 2–0 | 1–5 | 2–1 | 3–2 | 0–0 | 1–1 | 2–1 | 1–0 | 1–0 | 2–1 | 2–0 | 2–2 | 0–2 |
| Cartagena FC | 1–0 | 3–0 | — | 1–1 | 1–1 | 4–1 | 0–0 | 1–0 | 2–0 | 0–0 | 1–0 | 9–2 | 2–0 | 1–0 | 1–2 | 2–0 | 2–1 | 1–0 | 0–1 | 1–0 |
| Elche | 3–0 | 2–0 | 2–1 | — | 3–1 | 0–0 | 1–2 | 2–1 | 0–0 | 2–1 | 3–1 | 2–1 | 1–0 | 2–1 | 1–0 | 2–1 | 2–1 | 0–0 | 4–0 | 3–1 |
| Gimnàstic | 1–1 | 1–0 | 0–0 | 0–0 | — | 3–1 | 1–3 | 3–1 | 1–5 | 1–0 | 2–1 | 2–3 | 0–0 | 3–0 | 0–1 | 2–1 | 2–2 | 2–0 | 1–0 | 0–1 |
| Girona | 0–0 | 1–0 | 0–2 | 1–1 | 1–1 | — | 0–2 | 0–0 | 0–2 | 2–1 | 1–2 | 1–3 | 4–1 | 2–4 | 0–2 | 1–0 | 2–1 | 1–2 | 1–0 | 0–0 |
| Hércules | 2–0 | 2–0 | 1–1 | 2–0 | 4–0 | 0–0 | — | 3–0 | 2–0 | 2–0 | 3–2 | 3–0 | 4–0 | 1–0 | 2–0 | 3–0 | 2–3 | 1–0 | 5–1 | 0–0 |
| Horadada | 0–0 | 1–2 | 0–6 | 1–0 | 2–3 | 1–2 | 0–0 | — | 0–3 | 0–1 | 4–1 | 3–0 | 0–0 | 1–0 | 0–3 | 1–2 | 0–0 | 2–1 | 1–1 | 1–0 |
| Hospitalet | 3–1 | 3–0 | 0–1 | 1–2 | 2–0 | 0–0 | 3–2 | 2–1 | — | 1–1 | 0–1 | 1–0 | 2–1 | 1–0 | 0–3 | 1–2 | 1–3 | 3–0 | 2–0 | 2–1 |
| Ibiza | 3–0 | 0–0 | 2–0 | 1–1 | 0–0 | 1–1 | 3–1 | 3–0 | 3–0 | — | 1–1 | 1–1 | 6–2 | 0–0 | 2–2 | 0–0 | 0–0 | 0–2 | 2–0 | 0–0 |
| Levante | 2–1 | 2–0 | 1–1 | 0–5 | 5–1 | 4–1 | 2–1 | 4–1 | 1–2 | 1–1 | — | 3–0 | 2–1 | 3–1 | 1–3 | 3–1 | 3–0 | 3–1 | 0–1 | 0–3 |
| Llíria | 4–1 | 1–2 | 1–2 | 3–2 | 0–2 | 0–4 | 1–1 | 3–1 | 0–0 | 3–0 | 1–1 | — | 2–2 | 0–0 | 0–2 | 2–1 | 2–1 | 0–0 | 1–1 | 1–5 |
| Sporting Mahonés | 0–3 | 0–1 | 2–3 | 0–3 | 0–2 | 1–0 | 5–2 | 1–1 | 1–0 | 0–1 | 1–0 | 3–0 | — | 0–5 | 2–2 | 0–0 | 1–2 | 1–2 | 0–2 | 2–0 |
| Manlleu | 3–0 | 0–0 | 1–0 | 0–0 | 0–1 | 2–1 | 2–3 | 3–1 | 3–1 | 2–2 | 0–0 | 4–1 | 2–1 | — | 0–2 | 3–1 | 0–0 | 3–0 | 1–1 | 0–1 |
| Murcia | 1–2 | 2–0 | 2–0 | 2–1 | 2–1 | 1–1 | 3–2 | 2–0 | 2–0 | 2–1 | 2–2 | 1–0 | 0–0 | 1–1 | — | 2–0 | 4–2 | 3–1 | 2–1 | 2–0 |
| Orihuela | 1–3 | 0–1 | 0–0 | 0–1 | 3–2 | 0–0 | 1–1 | 2–0 | 0–3 | 3–1 | 2–1 | 2–0 | 2–0 | 1–0 | 1–1 | — | 0–3 | 1–1 | 2–1 | 1–2 |
| Sant Andreu | 5–0 | 3–0 | 2–1 | 4–3 | 2–0 | 1–2 | 2–1 | 2–1 | 4–3 | 3–0 | 2–3 | 4–0 | 2–0 | 4–1 | 2–1 | 4–1 | — | 5–0 | 3–0 | 1–0 |
| Torrevieja | 2–1 | 0–2 | 1–1 | 1–1 | 2–0 | 1–1 | 1–0 | 1–0 | 1–1 | 4–3 | 1–2 | 1–0 | 2–3 | 2–1 | 1–0 | 1–0 | 0–3 | — | 0–2 | 0–1 |
| Valencia B | 3–3 | 1–0 | 1–0 | 0–1 | 2–2 | 0–3 | 3–5 | 5–1 | 2–1 | 0–0 | 2–2 | 3–1 | 4–1 | 0–1 | 3–1 | 3–0 | 2–4 | 3–0 | — | 2–0 |
| Yeclano | 2–1 | 2–2 | 5–0 | 1–1 | 3–0 | 2–0 | 1–1 | 3–1 | 2–0 | 2–2 | 1–0 | 1–1 | 0–0 | 2–1 | 0–1 | 1–0 | 1–1 | 2–0 | 1–0 | — |

Source: BDFútbol
Legend: Blue = home team win; Yellow = draw; Red = away team win.

=== Top goalscorers ===
| Goalscorers | Goals | Team |
|---|---|---|
| (Spain) Eduardo Rodríguez | 32 | Hércules |
| (Uruguay) James Cantero | 21 | Murcia |
| (Spain) Quini | 21 | Levante |
| (Spain) Salvador Soriano | 18 | Gimnàstic |
| (Spain) Siscu | 17 | Manlleu |

=== Top goalkeepers ===
| Goalkeeper | Goals | Matches | Average | Team |
|---|---|---|---|---|
| (Spain) Juan Espín | 26 | 37 | 0.7 | Yeclano |
| (Spain) Luis Raudona | 31 | 38 | 0.82 | Cartagena |
| (Spain) Francisco Abellán | 33 | 38 | 0.87 | Murcia |
| (Spain) Miguel Recio | 32 | 36 | 0.89 | Elche |
| (Spain) Javier Falagán | 32 | 34 | 0.94 | Hércules |

== Group 4 ==
Teams from Andalusia, Canary Islands, Extremadura and Melilla.

=== Teams ===
Location of teams in Segunda División B Gr. 4 1992–93
Canary Islands

| Team | Founded | Home city | Stadium |
|---|---|---|---|
| Betis Deportivo | 1962 | Seville, Andalusia | Benito Villamarín |
| Cacereño | 1919 | Cáceres, Extremadura | Príncipe Felipe |
| Córdoba | 1954 | Córdoba, Andalusia | El Arcángel |
| Écija Balompié | 1939 | Écija, Andalusia | San Pablo |
| Ejido | 1969 | El Ejido, Andalusia | Santo Domingo |
| Estepona | 1947 | Estepona, Andalusia | Francisco Muñoz Pérez |
| Extremadura | 1924 | Almendralejo, Extremadura | Francisco de la Hera |
| Granada | 1931 | Granada, Andalusia | Los Cármenes |
| Las Palmas | 1949 | Las Palmas, Canary Islands | Insular |
| Real Jaén | 1929 | Jaén, Andalusia | La Victoria |
| Linense | 1912 | La Línea de la Concepción, Andalusia | Municipal La Línea de la Concepción |
| Marino | 1936 | Playa de las Américas, Canary Islands | Antonio Domínguez Alfonso |
| Maspalomas | 1969 | Maspalomas, Canary Islands | Municipal de Maspalomas |
| Melilla | 1976 | Melilla | Álvarez Claro |
| Mensajero | 1924 | Santa Cruz de La Palma, Canary Islands | Silvestre Carrillo |
| Portuense | 1928 | El Puerto de Santa María, Andalusia | José del Cuvillo |
| Recreativo de Huelva | 1889 | Huelva, Andalusia | Colombino |
| San Roque de Lepe | 1956 | Lepe, Andalusia | Municipal de Deportes |
| Sevilla B | 1950 | Seville, Andalusia | Viejo Nervión |
| Xerez | 1947 | Jerez de la Frontera, Andalusia | Chapín |

=== League table ===
| Pos | Team | Pld | W | D | L | GF | GA | GD | Pts | Qualification or relegation |
|---|---|---|---|---|---|---|---|---|---|---|
| 1 | Las Palmas | 36 | 22 | 13 | 1 | 65 | 20 | +45 | 57 | Qualification for the promotion playoffs |
| 2 | Xerez | 36 | 18 | 13 | 5 | 45 | 23 | +22 | 49 | Qualification for the promotion playoffs |
| 3 | Granada | 36 | 20 | 8 | 8 | 49 | 33 | +16 | 48 | Qualification for the promotion playoffs |
| 4 | Jaén | 36 | 15 | 13 | 8 | 53 | 30 | +23 | 43 | Qualification for the promotion playoffs |
| 5 | Cacereño | 36 | 13 | 14 | 9 | 44 | 30 | +14 | 40 | |
| 6 | Extremadura | 36 | 15 | 8 | 13 | 53 | 42 | +11 | 38 | |
| 7 | Sevilla B | 36 | 13 | 10 | 13 | 38 | 38 | 0 | 36 | |
| 8 | Recreativo | 36 | 13 | 9 | 14 | 47 | 44 | +3 | 35 (Note: Recreativo finished ahead of Córdoba on head-to-head points: Córdoba–Recreativo 1–2, Recreativo–Córdoba 2–1) | |
| 9 | Córdoba | 36 | 11 | 13 | 12 | 36 | 35 | +1 | 35 | |
| 10 | Écija | 36 | 10 | 14 | 12 | 33 | 34 | −1 | 34 (Note: Écija finished ahead of Mensajero and Maspalomas on head-to-head points: Écija 5 pts, Mensajero 4 pts, Maspalomas 3 pts) | |
| 11 | Mensajero | 36 | 12 | 10 | 14 | 48 | 52 | −4 | 34 | |
| 12 | Maspalomas | 36 | 11 | 12 | 13 | 32 | 38 | −6 | 34 | |
| 13 | Estepona | 36 | 10 | 13 | 13 | 25 | 35 | −10 | 33 (Note: Estepona finished ahead of Polideportivo Ejido on overall goal difference) | |
| 14 | Polideportivo Ejido | 36 | 10 | 13 | 13 | 31 | 45 | −14 | 33 | |
| 15 | Melilla | 36 | 10 | 12 | 14 | 26 | 31 | −5 | 32 | |
| 16 | San Roque | 36 | 8 | 15 | 13 | 31 | 42 | −11 | 31 | |
| 17 | Betis B | 36 | 11 | 8 | 17 | 31 | 40 | −9 | 30 | Relegation to Tercera División |
| 18 | Linense | 36 | 6 | 15 | 15 | 25 | 54 | −29 | 27 | Relegation to Tercera División |
| 19 | Marino (Note: Two points deducted after not appear in his match against Melilla) | 36 | 3 | 9 | 24 | 25 | 71 | −46 | 13 | Relegation to Tercera División |
| 20 | Portuense (Note: Retired of the competition, annulling the results of all the games until then) | 0 | 0 | 0 | 0 | 0 | 0 | 0 | 0 | Retired |

Source: BDFútbol
Rules for classification: 1) points; 2) head-to-head points; 3) head-to-head goal difference; 4) goal difference; 5) number of goals scored

=== Results ===
| Home \ Away | BET | CAC | COR | ECI | EJI | EST | EXT | GRA | JAE | LPA | LNS | MAR | MAS | MEL | MEN | REC | SRL | SEV | XER |
|---|---|---|---|---|---|---|---|---|---|---|---|---|---|---|---|---|---|---|---|
| Betis Deportivo | — | 1–0 | 3–0 | 0–1 | 0–0 | 0–1 | 0–2 | 1–2 | 0–1 | 0–2 | 2–1 | 1–0 | 0–1 | 3–0 | 0–0 | 1–0 | 3–1 | 1–0 | 0–2 |
| Cacereño | 1–0 | — | 0–0 | 2–0 | 3–2 | 3–0 | 1–3 | 2–0 | 0–0 | 1–1 | 4–0 | 4–0 | 1–1 | 2–0 | 3–1 | 1–1 | 3–0 | 0–0 | 1–1 |
| Córdoba | 2–0 | 0–2 | — | 1–0 | 4–0 | 2–0 | 0–1 | 5–1 | 1–0 | 0–1 | 0–0 | 2–1 | 2–0 | 1–0 | 3–1 | 1–2 | 0–0 | 1–1 | 0–0 |
| Écija | 1–1 | 2–2 | 1–1 | — | 2–2 | 2–0 | 2–2 | 1–0 | 0–0 | 0–1 | 2–0 | 4–0 | 2–1 | 1–1 | 2–0 | 1–0 | 1–0 | 0–0 | 0–0 |
| Ejido | 1–1 | 1–0 | 0–0 | 3–2 | — | 0–0 | 0–1 | 0–2 | 1–0 | 1–1 | 0–0 | 3–1 | 0–0 | 0–0 | 2–1 | 3–0 | 2–1 | 1–0 | 1–1 |
| Estepona | 1–0 | 0–0 | 0–0 | 1–0 | 0–0 | — | 1–1 | 2–3 | 0–0 | 0–3 | 2–2 | 1–0 | 1–0 | 0–0 | 1–0 | 1–3 | 1–2 | 1–0 | 2–2 |
| Extremadura | 2–1 | 0–0 | 1–1 | 2–1 | 0–1 | 2–1 | — | 2–2 | 2–0 | 1–1 | 7–1 | 1–2 | 3–0 | 1–2 | 4–2 | 3–0 | 1–2 | 2–0 | 2–3 |
| Granada | 0–0 | 3–0 | 3–1 | 4–1 | 1–0 | 0–2 | 1–0 | — | 2–1 | 0–0 | 5–1 | 2–0 | 1–0 | 0–0 | 2–0 | 4–1 | 2–1 | 1–1 | 1–0 |
| Jaén | 1–1 | 1–1 | 5–1 | 0–1 | 3–0 | 3–1 | 4–0 | 0–0 | — | 2–0 | 3–0 | 2–1 | 2–0 | 3–0 | 5–1 | 1–0 | 1–1 | 4–2 | 2–1 |
| Las Palmas | 5–0 | 3–0 | 2–1 | 0–0 | 6–1 | 2–1 | 1–0 | 1–0 | 3–1 | — | 3–3 | 3–0 | 3–1 | 3–0 | 3–0 | 0–0 | 4–0 | 0–0 | 2–0 |
| Linense | 0–0 | 1–0 | 0–0 | 0–0 | 1–2 | 2–0 | 1–0 | 0–2 | 1–1 | 0–1 | — | 1–0 | 1–2 | 1–0 | 1–2 | 1–1 | 0–0 | 1–2 | 0–3 |
| Marino | 1–4 | 1–1 | 1–0 | 0–0 | 2–0 | 0–1 | 1–2 | 0–1 | 0–0 | 2–2 | 1–1 | — | 1–3 | 2–2 | 2–2 | 0–6 | 0–1 | 1–2 | 0–1 |
| Maspalomas | 1–2 | 0–0 | 2–2 | 0–0 | 0–0 | 2–0 | 2–1 | 0–0 | 1–0 | 0–0 | 0–0 | 3–2 | — | 0–0 | 2–1 | 3–2 | 0–0 | 2–0 | 0–1 |
| Melilla | 1–3 | 0–1 | 2–0 | 4–1 | 1–0 | 0–0 | 0–0 | 2–0 | 0–1 | 0–0 | 0–0 | 0–0 | 1–0 | — | 1–1 | 0–1 | 2–0 | 0–2 | 2–0 |
| Mensajero | 1–0 | 1–1 | 1–1 | 1–0 | 3–1 | 1–0 | 2–1 | 6–1 | 1–1 | 0–0 | 0–0 | 6–0 | 3–1 | 2–1 | — | 0–1 | 1–0 | 4–3 | 1–1 |
| Recreativo | 2–0 | 2–0 | 2–1 | 2–0 | 2–2 | 0–0 | 1–2 | 0–1 | 1–1 | 2–4 | 5–0 | 1–1 | 3–1 | 0–3 | 2–1 | — | 1–1 | 0–2 | 1–2 |
| San Roque de Lepe | 2–2 | 0–2 | 1–1 | 0–0 | 2–0 | 0–0 | 1–1 | 1–2 | 1–1 | 2–3 | 1–3 | 1–1 | 2–1 | 1–0 | 4–0 | 1–1 | — | 0–0 | 0–0 |
| Sevilla B | 1–0 | 2–1 | 0–1 | 3–2 | 3–1 | 2–1 | 0–1 | 0–0 | 3–3 | 0–0 | 2–0 | 3–0 | 1–2 | 0–0 | 1–0 | 1–0 | 0–1 | — | 0–3 |
| Xerez | 3–0 | 2–1 | 1–0 | 0–0 | 1–0 | 0–0 | 2–1 | 1–0 | 2–0 | 1–1 | 1–1 | 3–1 | 0–0 | 1–0 | 1–1 | 0–1 | 2–0 | 3–1 | — |

Source: BDFútbol
Legend: Blue = home team win; Yellow = draw; Red = away team win.

=== Top goalscorers ===
| Goalscorers | Goals | Team |
|---|---|---|
| (Spain) Melenas | 27 | Extremadura |
| (Spain) Nando Socas | 21 | Mensajero |
| (Spain) Juan Manuel Prieto | 16 | Cacereño |
| (Spain) Andrés González | 14 | Granada |
| (Spain) Salvador Cardona | 13 | Jaén |

=== Top goalkeepers ===
| Goalkeeper | Goals | Matches | Average | Team |
|---|---|---|---|---|
| (Spain) José Miguel Robayna | 13 | 28 | 0.46 | Las Palmas |
| (Uruguay) Avelino Viña | 29 | 36 | 0.81 | Jaén |
| (Spain) Javier Echevarría | 30 | 36 | 0.83 | Cacereño |
| (Spain) Antonio Notario | 33 | 37 | 0.89 | Granada |
| (Spain) Manuel Ruiz | 35 | 38 | 0.92 | Estepona |
