= Deportivo Alavés =

Spanish professional football club

- Full name: Deportivo Alavés, S.A.D.
- Nicknames: Babazorros; El Glorioso (The Glorious One); Los Albiazules (The Blue-and-Whites)
- Founded: 23 January 1921; 105 years ago as Sport Friend's Club
- Stadium: Mendizorroza
- Capacity: 19,840
- Owner: Baskonia-Alavés Group
- President: Alfonso Fernández de Trocóniz
- Head coach: Quique Sánchez Flores
- League: La Liga
- 2025–26: La Liga, 14th of 20
- Website: deportivoalaves.com
Home colours	Away colours	Third colours

Deportivo Alavés, S.A.D. (Spanish pronunciation: [depoɾˈtiβo alaˈβes]; Sporting Alavés), usually known as Alavés, is a Spanish football club based in Vitoria-Gasteiz, Álava, in the autonomous community of the Basque Country. Founded on 23 January 1921 as Sport Friends Club, the club competes in La Liga, the top flight of Spanish football.

It is recognized as the third-most successful team in the Basque Country following Athletic Club of Bilbao and Real Sociedad of San Sebastián. Its biggest success was in 2001 when, in the year of its debut in European competition, it reached the 2001 UEFA Cup Final, where it played against Liverpool. It was defeated 5–4 on a golden goal. In 2017, the club reached the final of the Copa del Rey, losing 3–1 to Barcelona.

The team's home kit is blue and white-striped shirt, blue shorts and white socks. It holds home matches at the 19,840-seater Mendizorrotza Stadium and uses other facilities located in Ibaia dedicated to training.

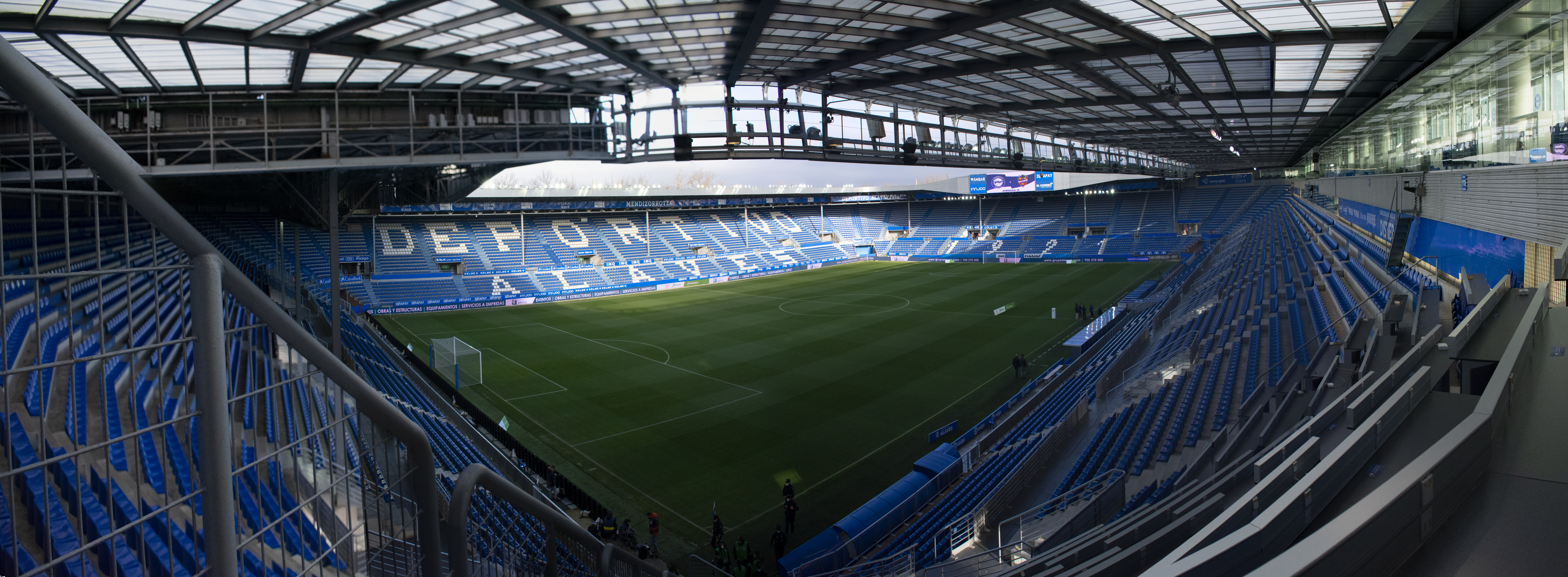
Deportivo Alavés home stadium Campo de Fútbol de Mendizorrotza.

== History ==
Chart of Deportivo Alavés league performance 1929-present

Founded in 1920, the initial name of the club was Sport Friends, but on 23 January 1921 the name was changed to the current one, and this is considered the official foundation date. Alavés was the first club to win promotion from the Segunda División to La Liga in 1929–30, a stint which would last three years. In its first season in Primera División Alavés finished 8th from 10 teams, just 1 point away from being relegated.

In 1953–54 the club would reach the top league again for a two-year spell. With Roman Galarraga as a coach, the club won a long-awaited promotion to Segunda División in the 1973–74 season. In June 1983, after having avoided relegation in the previous season, Alavés went down to Segunda División B, where it remained until the 1985–86 campaign. After years of seriously facing disappearance which lasted well into the 1990s (playing in the fourth tier during the late 1980s), Alavés finally achieved a promotion back into the Segunda División in 1994–95 after two consecutive years of winning their group in Segunda División B – created as the new third level in 1977 – but failing in the promotion play-offs.

After winning the Segunda División in 1997–98, Alavés returned to the top level after a 42-year hiatus. Following their return season in which they escaped relegation by a single point, they achieved two wins against Barcelona in the following campaign and would qualify for the UEFA Cup for the first time upon finishing sixth (to date, their highest-ever placing, coming just 12 years after their lowest-ever: eighth in their group in the fourth level).

Lineups of the 2001 UEFA Cup Final between Liverpool and Alavés.

As well as concluding the domestic campaign in tenth position, in 2000–01 the Basque club reached the final of the UEFA Cup after beating Internazionale, Rayo Vallecano and 1. FC Kaiserslautern, the latter in a crushing 9–2 aggregate victory. The final ended in a 4–5 loss against Liverpool, Alavés losing to an "own-golden goal" after taking the match to extra time. The match also featured two red cards and two disallowed goals in extra time in addition to the nine goals which did count, and has been described by some observers as one of the greatest showpiece games in the competition's history.

Alavés ended 2001–02 in seventh position and qualified for the UEFA Cup for a second time, although the European campaign of 2002–03 was far less successful than two years earlier, with an opening win over Ankaragücü followed by a defeat to another Turkish Süper Lig side, Beşiktaş. On 26 January 2003, the club celebrated their 100th win in La Liga after defeating Real Valladolid 3–1.

Although Alavés were relegated after 2002–03, they regained top-flight status two years later. In this time, Alavés was bought by Ukrainian–American businessman Dmitry Pietrman, and several clashes followed with the club's coaches, players and fans alike. The top-division return only lasted one season as the club went through three head coaches and finished in 18th position, one point from safety. Piterman departed in 2007, leaving the club deep in debt after his tenure. After two years of battling against relegation to the third level, Alavés eventually succumbed in 2008–09.

A subsequent black period in Segunda B lasted four years until Alavés was bought by José Antonio Querejeta and were promoted again to the second division in 2013 as overall champions of the third tier, providing an opportunity to sort out its economic difficulties. Three years later, on 29 May 2016, Alavés was promoted to La Liga as second-tier champions after beating Numancia 2–0 to overtake Leganés on the final day.

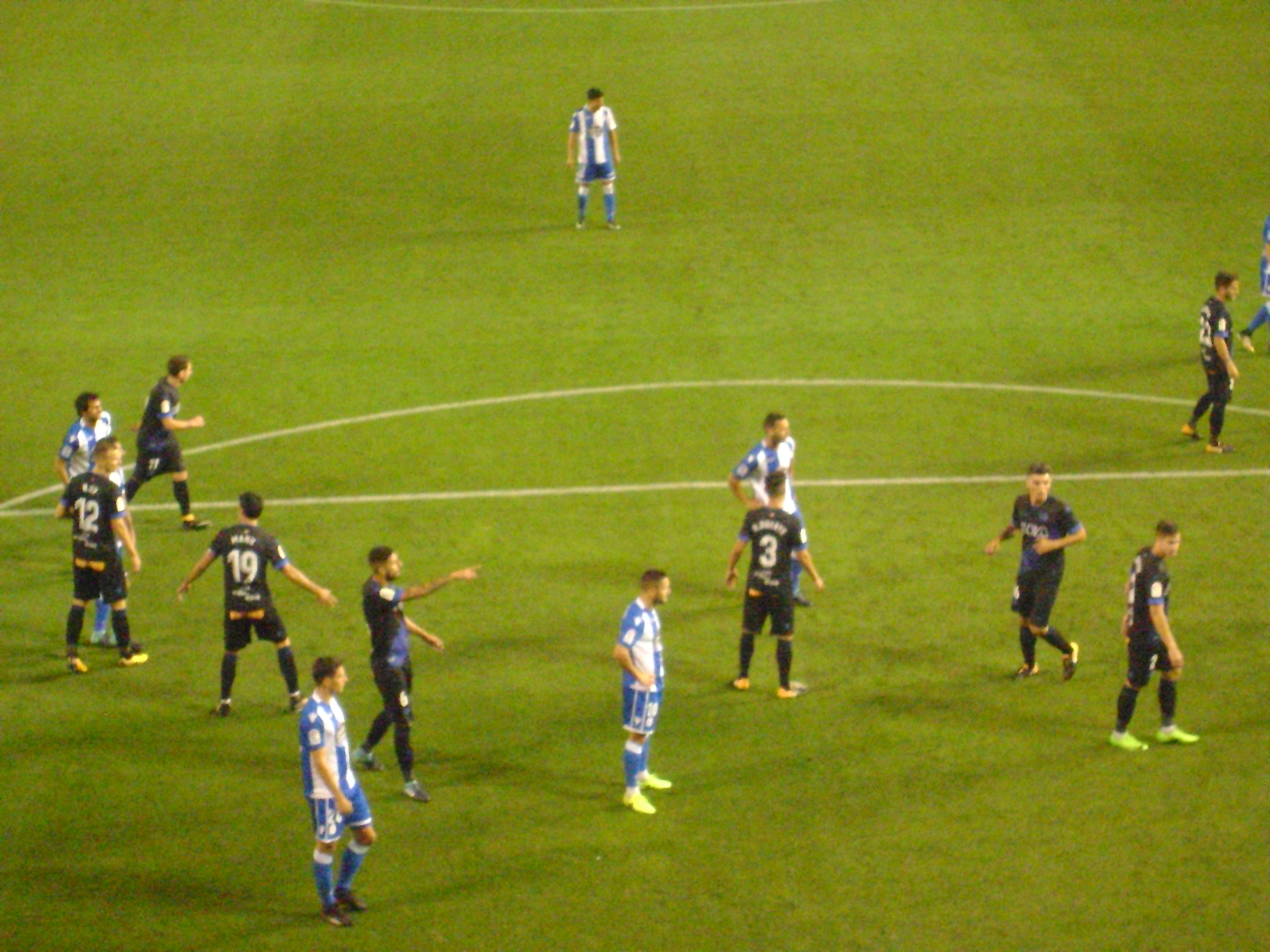
Deportivo de La Coruña vs. Alavés.

On 10 September 2016, Alavés got their first win of their return season in La Liga by defeating defending La Liga champions Barcelona 2–1 at the Camp Nou. On 7 February 2017, Alavés qualified for the 2017 Copa del Rey Final after eliminating Celta de Vigo in the semi-finals of the competition. This was the first time in their history that the club had qualified for the final of the national cup, their previous best being the semi-finals in 1998 and 2004. Their opponents in the final would be Barcelona, and coincidentally the two clubs met in the league directly after their cup semi-finals; the Catalans inflicted a 6–0 defeat on Alavés in their own Mendizorrotza Stadium, exacting revenge for the result earlier in the season. Barcelona also won the final, held at the Estadio Vicente Calderón with a 3–1 scoreline, meaning there would be no return to European competition for Alavés. In the La Liga that season Alavés finished 9th with 14 wins, 13 draws and 11 losses. In the 2021–22 season, Alavés were relegated following defeat on the penultimate matchday by Levante (who also went down) to end their six-year stay in La Liga, the longest top-flight run in the club's history. The following season saw the club achieve promotion back to La Liga at the first attempt, winning the play-off final 0–1 against fellow relegated side Levante to ensure their return to the top tier for the 2023–24 season.

== Seasons ==
=== Season to season ===
Season	Tier	Division	Place	Copa del Rey
1929	2	2ª	3rd	Round of 16
1929–30	2	2ª	1st	Quarter-finals
1930–31	1	1ª	8th	Round of 16
1931–32	1	1ª	9th	Quarter-finals
1932–33	1	1ª	10th	
1933–34	2	2ª	10th	
1939–40	2	2ª	8th	Round of 16
1940–41	3	3ª	1st	Second round
1941–42	2	2ª	3rd	
1942–43	2	2ª	8th	Round of 16
1943–44	3	3ª	2nd	Fifth round
1944–45	3	3ª	3rd	Round of 16
1945–46	3	3ª	5th	
1946–47	3	3ª	7th	
1947–48	3	3ª	10th	Third round
1948–49	3	3ª	12th	First round
1949–50	3	3ª	10th	
1950–51	3	3ª	2nd	
1951–52	2	2ª	9th	
1952–53	2	2ª	4th	Round of 16

Season	Tier	Division	Place	Copa del Rey
1953–54	2	2ª	1st	Round of 16
1954–55	1	1ª	10th	Round of 16
1955–56	1	1ª	14th	
1956–57	2	2ª	5th	
1957–58	2	2ª	7th	
1958–59	2	2ª	13th	First round
1959–60	2	2ª	13th	First round
1960–61	3	3ª	1st	
1961–62	2	2ª	4th	Round of 16
1962–63	2	2ª	8th	Round of 16
1963–64	2	2ª	16th	Round of 16
1964–65	3	3ª	1st	
1965–66	3	3ª	3rd	
1966–67	3	3ª	7th	
1967–68	3	3ª	1st	
1968–69	2	2ª	14th	
1969–70	3	3ª	9th	First round
1970–71	4	1ª Reg.	1st	
1971–72	3	3ª	7th	First round
1972–73	3	3ª	3rd	Second round

Season	Tier	Division	Place	Copa del Rey
1973–74	3	3ª	1st	Second round
1974–75	2	2ª	16th	Third round
1975–76	2	2ª	15th	Second round
1976–77	2	2ª	8th	Second round
1977–78	2	2ª	11th	Quarter-finals
1978–79	2	2ª	9th	Quarter-finals
1979–80	2	2ª	9th	Round of 16
1980–81	2	2ª	8th	Round of 16
1981–82	2	2ª	17th	Third round
1982–83	2	2ª	17th	
1983–84	3	2ª B	3rd	Second round
1984–85	3	2ª B	3rd	Third round
1985–86	3	2ª B	5th	Second round
1986–87	4	3ª	7th	First round
1987–88	4	3ª	8th	
1988–89	4	3ª	2nd	
1989–90	4	3ª	1st	
1990–91	3	2ª B	2nd	Second round
1991–92	3	2ª B	4th	Third round
1992–93	3	2ª B	1st	Third round

Season	Tier	Division	Place	Copa del Rey
1993–94	3	2ª B	1st	Third round
1994–95	3	2ª B	1st	First round
1995–96	2	2ª	7th	Second round
1996–97	2	2ª	13th	Second round
1997–98	2	2ª	1st	Semi-finals
1998–99	1	1ª	16th	Third round
1999–2000	1	1ª	6th	Round of 16
2000–01	1	1ª	10th	Round of 32
2001–02	1	1ª	7th	Round of 16
2002–03	1	1ª	19th	Round of 16
2003–04	2	2ª	4th	Semi-finals
2004–05	2	2ª	3rd	Round of 32
2005–06	1	1ª	18th	Third round
2006–07	2	2ª	17th	Round of 16
2007–08	2	2ª	17th	Third round
2008–09	2	2ª	19th	Second round
2009–10	3	2ª B	5th	First round
2010–11	3	2ª B	3rd	First round
2011–12	3	2ª B	6th	Third round
2012–13	3	2ª B	1st	Round of 16

Season	Tier	Division	Place	Copa del Rey
2013–14	2	2ª	18th	Third round
2014–15	2	2ª	13th	Round of 32
2015–16	2	2ª	1st	Third round
2016–17	1	1ª	9th	Runners-up
2017–18	1	1ª	14th	Quarter-finals
2018–19	1	1ª	11th	Round of 32
2019–20	1	1ª	16th	First round
2020–21	1	1ª	16th	Round of 32
2021–22	1	1ª	20th	Second round
2022–23	2	2ª	4th	Round of 16
2023–24	1	1ª	10th	Round of 16
2024–25	1	1ª	15th	Second round
2025–26	1	1ª	14th	Quarter-finals
2026–27	1	1ª		TBD

- 21 seasons in La Liga
- 38 seasons in Segunda División
- 12 seasons in Segunda División B
- 22 seasons in Tercera División
- 1 season in Categorías Regionales

=== Recent seasons ===
Season	Div	Pos.	Pld	W	D	L	GF	GA	Pts	Cup	Europe	Notes
2013–14	2A	18th	42	13	12	17	57	57	51	Third round		
2014–15	2A	13th	42	14	11	17	49	53	53	Round of 32		
2015–16	2A	1st	42	21	12	9	49	35	75	Third round		Promoted
2016–17	1	9th	38	14	13	11	41	43	55	Runners-up		
2017–18	1	14th	38	15	2	21	40	50	47	Quarter-finals		
2018–19	1	11th	38	13	11	14	39	50	50	Round of 32		
2019–20	1	16th	38	10	9	19	34	59	39	First round		
2020–21	1	16th	38	9	11	18	36	57	38	Round of 32		
2021–22	1	20th	38	8	7	23	31	65	31	Second round		Relegated
2022–23	2A	4th	42	19	14	9	47	33	71	Round of 16		Promoted in Play-off
2023–24	1	10th	38	12	10	16	36	46	46	Round of 16		
2024–25	1	15th	38	10	12	16	38	48	42	Second round		
2025–26	1	14th	38	11	10	17	44	56	43	Quarter-finals		

== Seasons in Europe ==
Season	Competition	Round	Opponent	Home	Away	Aggregate
2000–01	UEFA Cup	First round	(Turkey) Gaziantepspor	0–0	3–4	3–4
2000–01	UEFA Cup	Second round	(Norway) Lillestrøm SK	1–3	2–2	3–5
2000–01	UEFA Cup	Third round	(Norway) Rosenborg	1–1	1–3	4–2
2000–01	UEFA Cup	Round of 16	(Italy) Inter Milan	3–3	0–2	5–3
2000–01	UEFA Cup	Quarter-finals	(Spain) Rayo Vallecano	3–0	2–1	4–2
2000–01	UEFA Cup	Semi-final	(Germany) Kaiserslautern	5–1	1–4	9–2
2000–01	UEFA Cup	Final	(England) Liverpool	5–4		
2002–03	UEFA Cup	First round	(Turkey) Ankaragücü	1–2	3–0	1–5
2002–03	UEFA Cup	Second round	(Turkey) Beşiktaş	1–1	1–0	1–2

== Players ==
=== Current squad ===
As of 3 September 2026

Note: Flags indicate national team as defined under FIFA eligibility rules; some limited exceptions apply. Players may hold more than one non-FIFA nationality.

No.	Pos.	Nation	Player
1	GK	ESP	Antonio Sivera (captain)
2	DF	ARG	Nicolás Valentini
3	DF	MAR	Youssef Enríquez
4	MF	ESP	Denis Suárez
5	DF	ARG	Facundo Garcés
6	MF	ESP	Ander Guevara (vice-captain)
7	MF	ESP	Ángel Pérez
8	MF	ESP	Antonio Blanco
9	FW	DOM	Mariano Díaz
10	MF	ESP	Carles Aleñá
11	FW	ESP	Toni Martínez
12	DF	ESP	Hugo Novoa
13	GK	ARG	Adrián Rodríguez
14	DF	ARG	Nahuel Tenaglia (3rd captain)

No.	Pos.	Nation	Player
15	FW	ARG	Lucas Boyé
16	DF	FIN	Ville Koski
17	DF	ESP	Jonny Otto
18	MF	ESP	Mikel Rodríguez
19	MF	ESP	Pablo Ibáñez
20	FW	ESP	Aitor Mañas
21	MF	ALG	Abde Rebbach
22	MF	ESP	Miguel Rodríguez
23	MF	URU	Carlos Protesoni
24	MF	GUI	Selu Diallo
27	DF	ESP	Xanet Olaiz
29	MF	ESP	Izei Hernández
31	GK	CAN	Grégoire Świderski

=== Reserve team ===
Note: Flags indicate national team as defined under FIFA eligibility rules; some limited exceptions apply. Players may hold more than one non-FIFA nationality.

No.	Pos.	Nation	Player

=== Out on loan ===
Note: Flags indicate national team as defined under FIFA eligibility rules; some limited exceptions apply. Players may hold more than one non-FIFA nationality.

No.	Pos.	Nation	Player
—	DF	ESP	Álvaro García (at Villarreal B until 30 June 2027)
—	DF	ESP	Adrián Pica (at Penafiel until 30 June 2027)
—	DF	ESP	Egoitz Muñoz (at Córdoba until 30 June 2027)

No.	Pos.	Nation	Player
—	MF	ARG	Gustavo Albarracín (at Istra 1961 until 30 June 2027)
—	FW	ESP	Unai Ropero (at Racing Ferrol until 30 June 2027)

== Kits ==
The team wore kits from the Danish brand Hummel for several seasons. In the 2017–18 season, they started wearing new kits from Kelme. They had an agreement with Kelme until 2022. That same year, the team signed a new agreement with the German company Puma for four seasons.

For the launch of the new brand, they choose to bring back the traditional vertical stripes and keep the original black pants.

== Symbols ==
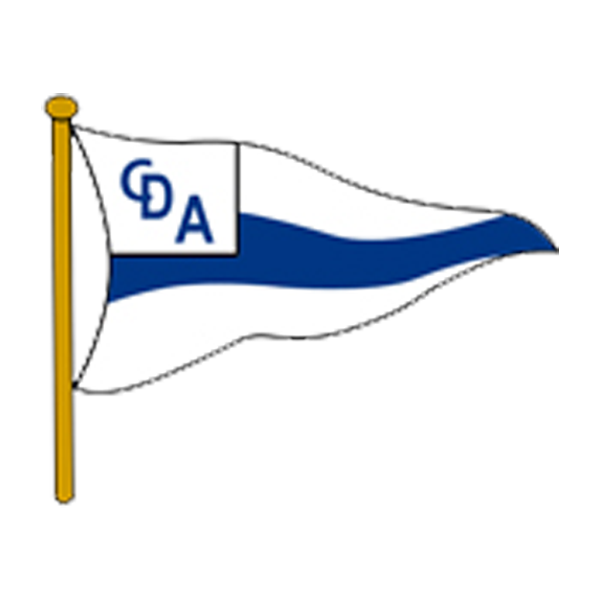
Second version of the pennant used as the club’s crest (1923)

Deportivo Alavés has changed its crest several times since it was founded in 1921. The first crest looked very similar to the official coat of arms of the Álava province. However, instead of a sword-wielding arm, the team's crest featured a blue and white pennant. At the top of the crest was a medallion with the initials "DA".

In 1922, the crest was simplified to just a pennant. The pennant was white with a blue center stripe and had the team initials "DA" in a square at the top left corner. This design stayed until 1950, but the initials changed when the team was renamed Club Deportivo Alavés. In 1950, the team redesigned its crest to look more like the traditional Álava symbol. They brought back the castle and lion, and also added a sword. The "C.D.A." pennant was moved behind the castle, and the whole design was placed within a circle with a crown on top.

== Honours ==
=== Domestic competitions ===
- Copa del Rey
  - Runners-up: 2016–17
- Segunda División
  - Winners (4): 1929–30, 1953–54, 1997–98, 2015–16
- Segunda División play-offs
  - Winners (1): 2023
- Segunda División B (Note: Third tier)
  - Winners (4): 1992–93, (Note: Not promoted in play-offs) 1993–94, (Note: Not promoted in play-offs) 1994–95, (Note: Promoted in play-offs) 2012–13 (Note: Promoted in play-offs, overall champion of division)
- Copa Federación de España
  - Winners: 1945–46
- Tercera División
  - Winners (5): (Note: Third tier) 1940–41, (Note: Promoted in play-offs) 1960–61, (Note: Promoted in play-offs) 1964–65, (Note: Not promoted in play-offs) 1967–68, (Note: Promoted in play-offs) 1973–74 (Note: Promoted directly)
  - Winners: (Note: Fourth tier) 1989–90 (Note: Promoted directly)
- Regional Championship
  - Biscay Championship: 1929–30
  - Gipuzkoa Championship: 1938–39

=== European competitions ===
- UEFA Cup
  - Runners-up: 2000–01

== Stadium information ==
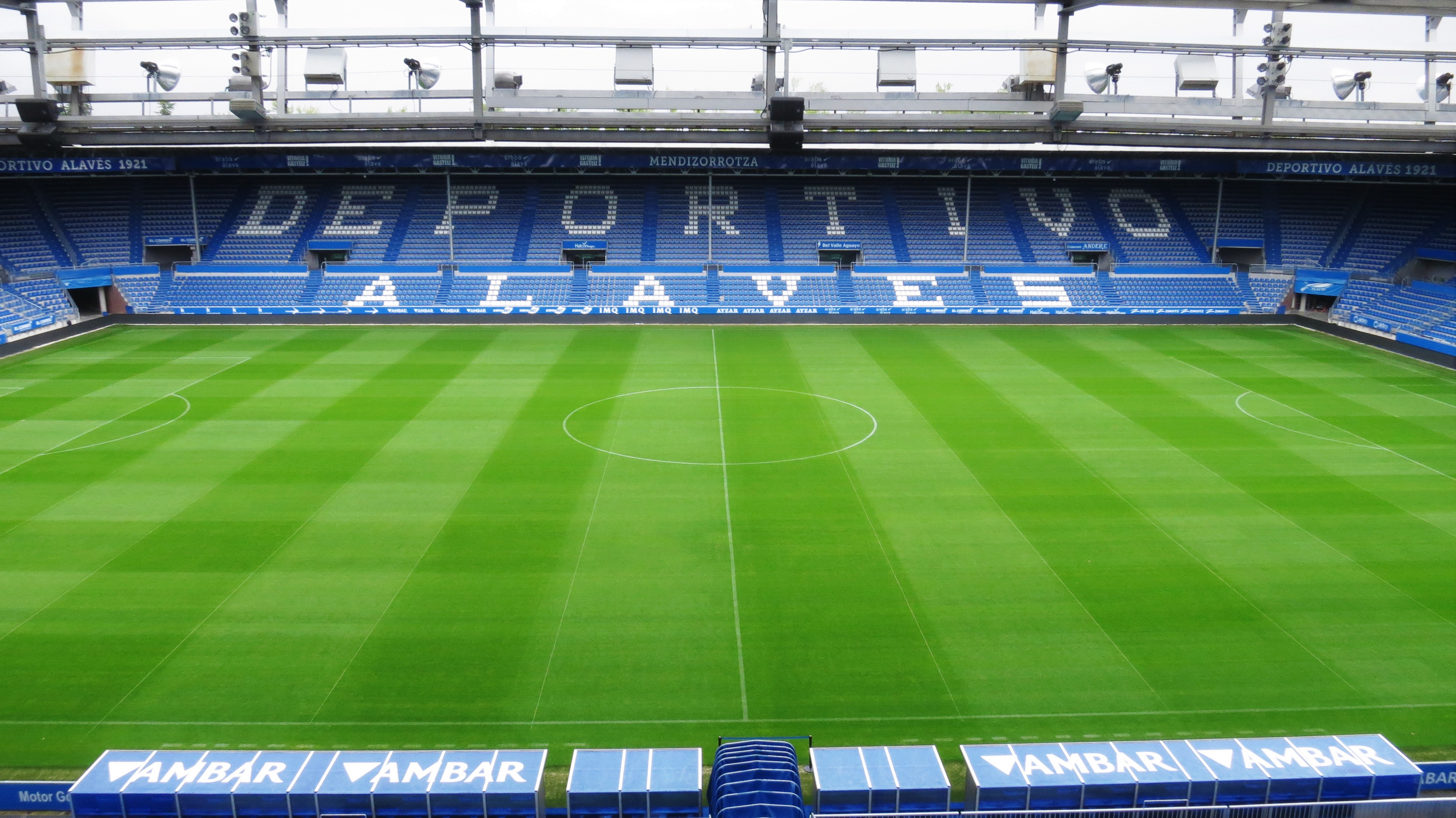
Mendizorrotza stadium

- Name – Mendizorrotza
- City – Vitoria-Gasteiz
- Capacity – 19,840
- Inauguration – 1924
- Pitch size – 105 m x 67 m
- Other facilities – El Glorioso and José Luis Compañón

== Famous players ==
=== World Cup players ===
The following players have been selected by their country in the World Cup, while playing for Alavés.

- (Australia) John Aloisi (2006)
- (Sweden) John Guidetti (2018)

== Management staff ==
Position	Name
Head coach	(Spain) Quique Sánchez Flores
Assistant coach	(Spain) Antonio Díaz (Spain) Santos Ramírez
Goalkeeping coach	(Spain) Javier Barbero
Fitness coach	(Spain) Óscar García (Serbia) Nenad Njaradi
Analyst	(Spain) Jon Zubillaga
Head of medical service	(Spain) Eduardo Ribot
Chief physiotherapist	(Spain) Javier Pérez
Physiotherapist	(Spain) Eneko Candal (Spain) Danel Etxeberria (Spain) Raúl Gutiérrez
Rehab fitness coach	(Spain) Iñigo Simón (Spain) Mario Pérez
Nutritionist	(Spain) Álex Garcia
Team delegate	(Spain) Lluís Codina
Material manager	(Spain) David Yébenes

== Coaches ==
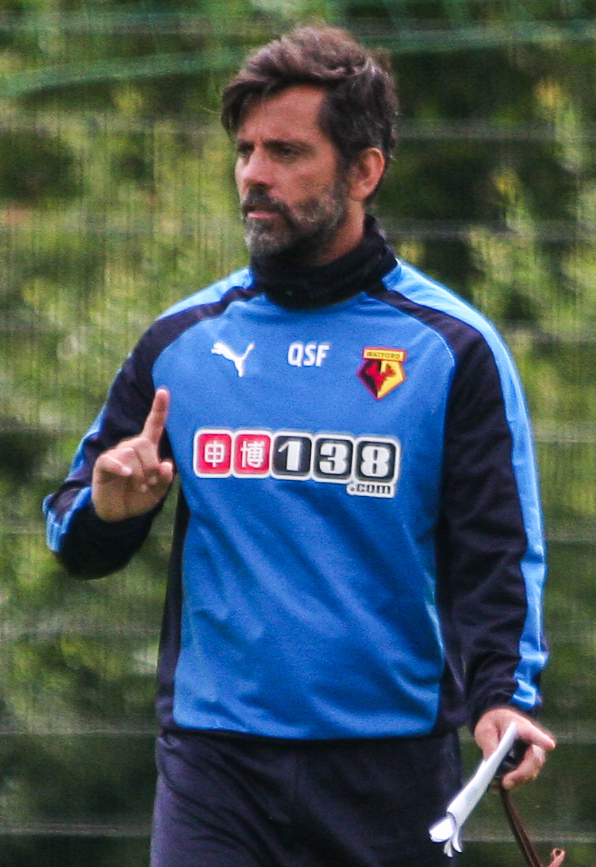
Quique Sánchez Flores

- (Spain) Without a coach (1921–26)
- (Spain) Amadeo García (1926–27)
- (Spain) Martínez "Tato" Juan José (1927–28)
- (England) Walter Harris (1927–28)
- (Spain) Amadeo García (1928–29)
- (Spain) Ramón Ángel Adarraga Gorrochategui (1928–29)
- (Spain) Francisco Baonza (1929–31)
- (Spain) Ramón Encinas (1931–32)
- (Spain) Amadeo García (1932–36)
- (Spain) Baltasar Albéniz (1937–40)
- (Spain) Domingo Rey Ciaurriz (1940–41)
- (Spain) Patxi Gamborena (1940–41)
- (Spain) Antero González (1941–42)
- (Spain) Cholín (1942–43)
- (Spain) Antero González (1943–44)
- (Spain) Cholín (1943–44)
- (Spain) Domingo Rey Ciaurriz (1944–46)
- (Spain) Domingo Rey Ciaurriz (1946–47)
- (Spain) Tiburcio Beristáin Berriozabal (1946–47)
- (Spain) Baltasar Albéniz (1947–48)
- (Spain) Tiburcio Beristáin Berriozabal (1947–48)
- (Spain) Desiderio Esparza (1947–48)
- (Spain) Isaac Oceja (1948–49)
- (Spain) Gabilondo (1948–49)
- (Spain) Carlos Petreñas (1949–50)
- (Spain) Lorenzo Ausina Tur (1950–52)
- (Spain) Antonio Molinos Buisán (1952–53)
- (Spain) Fernando Jiménez Muñoz (1952–53)
- (Spain) Alsúa (1952–53)
- (Spain) Manuel Echezarreta (1953–56)
- (Spain) Luis Urquiri (1956–58)
- (Spain) Manuel Echezarreta (1958–59)
- (Spain) Rafael Iriondo (1958–59)
- (Spain) Manuel Echezarreta (1959–60)
- (Spain) Román Galarraga (1960–63)
- (Spain) Marcial García Arroyo (1963–64)
- (Spain) Juan José Urquizu (1963–64)
- (Spain) Manolín (1963–64)
- (Spain) Ángel Calvo (1964–65)
- (Spain) Luis Urquiri (1965–66)
- (Spain) Juan María Lasa (1965–66)
- (Spain) Agustín Barcina Solá (1965–66)
- (Spain) Félix Elizondo Barrio (1966–67)
- (Spain) Juan Carlos Quincoces (1966–67)
- (Spain) Ignacio Izagirre (1967–68)
- (Spain) Ignacio Izagirre (1968–69) (coach)
- (Hungary) Ferenc Puskás (1968–69)
- (Hungary) Ferenc Puskás (1969–70) (technical director)
- (Spain) Arsenio Calvo Serna (1969–70)
- (Spain) Agustín Barcina Solá (1970–71)
- (Spain) García de Andoin (1971-72)
- (Spain) Agustín Barcina Solá (1971–72)
- (Spain) Manuel Millán Pérez (1971–72)
- (Spain) Koldo Aguirre (1972–73)
- (Spain) Román Galarraga (1973–74)
- (Spain) Ignacio Eizaguirre (1974–75)
- (Spain) Román Galarraga (1974–75)
- (Spain) Tito Reyes (1974–75)
- (Morocco) Abdallah Ben Barek (1975–76)
- (Spain) Joseíto (1976–78)
- (Spain) Txutxi Aranguren (1978–80)
- (Spain) García de Andoin (1980–82)
- (Spain) Luis María Astorga (1982–83)
- (Spain) García de Andoin (1982–83)
- (Spain) Emilio Quílez Parra (1983–84)
- (Spain) José Antonio Naya (1983–84)
- (Spain) Mané (1984–85)
- (Spain) Neme (1984–85)
- (Spain) Nando Yosu (1985–86)
- (Spain) Alberto Uriona (1986–87)
- (Spain) Iñaki Espizua Vadillo (1987–88)
- (Spain) Coque Echevarría (1987–88)
- (Spain) Juan María Begoña (1988–89)
- (Spain) Luis María Astorga (1989–91)
- (Spain) Luis María Astorga (1991–92)
- (Spain) Tomás Balbás Martínez de Arrieta (1991–92)
- (Spain) Luis Costa (1992–93)
- (Spain) Tomás Balbás Martínez de Arrieta (1992–93)
- (Spain) José Antonio Irulegui (1993–94)
- (Spain) Txutxi Aranguren (1994–96)
- (Spain) Txutxi Aranguren (1996–97)
- (Spain) Marco Antonio Boronat (1996–97)
- (Spain) Mané (1997–02)
- (Spain) Txutxi Aranguren (2002–03)
- (Spain) Mané (2002–03)
- (Spain) Pepe Mel (2003–04)
- (Spain) Chuchi Cos (2004–06)
- (Spain) Rafael Monfort Llopis (2005–06)
- (Spain) Juan Carlos Oliva (2005–06)
- (Argentina) Mario Benito Luna (2005–06)
- (Spain) Julio Bañuelos (2006–07)
- (Spain) Chuchi Cos (2006–07)
- (Spain) Fabri González (2006–07)
- (Spain) José Alberto Garmendia (2007)
- (Argentina) Mario Benito Luna (2006–07)
- (Spain) Quique Yagüe (2006–07)
- (Spain) Josu Uribe (2007–08)
- (Spain) José María Salmerón (2007–08)
- (Spain) Manix Mandiola (2008–09)
- (Spain) José María Salmerón (2008–09)
- (Spain) Javi López (2008–09)
- (Spain) Javi Pereira (2009–10)
- (Spain) Iñaki Ocenda (2009–10)
- (Spain) Miguel Ángel Álvarez Tomé (2010–11)
- (Spain) Luis de la Fuente (2011–12)
- (Spain) José Carlos Granero (2011–12)
- (Spain) Natxo González (2012–13)
- (Spain) Juan Carlos Mandiá (2013–14)
- (Spain) Alberto López (2013–14)
- (Spain) Natxo González (2013–14)
- (Spain) Alberto López (2014–15)
- (Spain) José Bordalás (2015–16)
- (Argentina) Mauricio Pellegrino (2016–17)
- (Argentina) Luis Zubeldía (2017–18)
- (Spain) Javi Cabello (2017)
- (Italy) Giovanni De Biasi (2017–18)
- (Spain) Javi Cabello (2017)
- (Spain) Abelardo (2017–18)
- (Spain) Abelardo (2018–19)
- (Spain) Asier Garitano (2019–20)
- (Spain) Juan Muñiz (2019–20)
- (Spain) Pablo Machín (2020–21)
- (Spain) Abelardo (2020–21)
- (Spain) Javier Calleja (2021)
- (Spain) José Luis Mendilibar (2021–22)
- (Spain) Julio Velázquez (2022)
- (Spain) Luis García (2022–24)
- (Argentina) Eduardo Coudet (2024–26)
- (Spain) Quique Sánchez Flores (2026–present)

== Affiliated clubs ==
=== Alavés B/C ===
The club's primary reserve team is Deportivo Alavés B, founded in 1960 and currently playing at the amateur Tercera División level of the senior Spanish system. When that team gained promotion to Segunda División B in 2000, a further reserve side Deportivo Alavés C was formed, later partnering with local team Club San Ignacio, but the C-team was discontinued in 2005 due to the poor financial situation at the club. San Ignacio and most other teams in the vicinity of Vitoria-Gasteiz continue to operate as partner clubs of Alavés.

=== California Victory ===
In 2007, Alavés operated a team in the USL First Division in the United States called the California Victory. The team played at Kezar Stadium in San Francisco, California, and wore the Alavés colors. However, Alavés, under new ownership, pulled its support for the club later that year, after which the Victory folded.

=== NK Rudeš ===
In May 2017, Alavés signed a ten-year partnership deal with NK Rudeš, freshly promoted Croatian First Football League club, with Rudeš acting as a feeder club to Alavés. In June 2018, Deportivo Alavés and NK Rudeš ended its partnership agreement.

=== Sochaux ===
In April 2018, Alavés signed an agreement with French club FC Sochaux-Montbéliard; however the partnership lasted only a few months, ending abruptly in December of the same year.

=== NK Istra 1961 ===
In June 2018 Alavés took a controlling interest in another Croatian top-tier club, NK Istra 1961, a few weeks after ending their agreement with Rudeš.
