= Antero González =

Spanish footballer (1901–1978)

Antero
Personal information
- Full name: Antero González de Audicana Inchaurraga
- Date of birth: 16 April 1901
- Place of birth: Durango, Spain
- Date of death: 28 January 1978 (aged 76)
- Place of death: Vitoria, Spain

International career
Years	Team	Apps	(Gls)
- Spain

Antero González de Audicana Inchaurraga (16 April 1901 – 28 January 1978) was a Spanish footballer and manager whose career was mostly associated with Deportivo Alavés. He competed in the men's tournament at the 1928 Summer Olympics.
