= García de Andoin =

Spanish footballer and coach

Personal information
- Full name: José María García de Andoin Pérez
- Date of birth: 22 May 1933
- Place of birth: Bilbao, Spain
- Date of death: 4 February 2017 (aged 83)
- Place of death: Miranda de Ebro, Spain
- Position: Midfielder

Senior career*
Years	Team	Apps	(Gls)
1955–1956	Villosa		
1957–1958	Alavés	16	(5)
1958–1959	Rayo Vallecano	11	(2)
1959–1960	Arenas Club de Getxo		
1960–1961	CD Izarra		

Managerial career
- 1963–1964: Indautxu
- 1966: Indautxu
- 1966: Osasuna
- 1969: Bilbao Athletic
- 1969–1970: Athletic Bilbao (assistant)
- 1970–1971: Oviedo
- 1971: Cádiz
- 1972: Alavés
- 1978–1979: Barakaldo
- 1980–1982: Alavés
- 1986–1989: Espanyol (assistant)
- 1989: Espanyol
- 1994: Zaragoza B
- 2005: Mirandés
- * Club domestic league appearances and goals

José María García de Andoin Pérez (22 May 1933 – 4 February 2017) was a Spanish footballer who played as a midfielder, and then later was a coach.
