= Eduardo Rodríguez (Spanish footballer) =

Spanish footballer

Personal information
- Full name: Eduardo Rodríguez Fernández
- Date of birth: 8 June 1966 (age 60)
- Place of birth: Sanlúcar de Barrameda, Spain
- Height: 1.77 m (5 ft 10 in)
- Position: Striker

Youth career
- Sanluqueño
- 1983–1984: Betis

Senior career*
Years	Team	Apps	(Gls)
1984–1989	Betis B		
1985–1991	Betis	7	(2)
1989–1990	→ Recreativo (loan)	29	(4)
1990–1991	→ Badajoz (loan)	41	(21)
1991–1993	Hércules	82	(49)
1993–1995	Rayo Vallecano	44	(8)
1995–1998	Hércules	88	(24)
Total		291	(108)
- * Club domestic league appearances and goals

Eduardo Rodríguez Fernández (born 8 June 1966) is a Spanish retired professional footballer who played as a striker. He is Hércules league's all-time top scorer and played professionally for 13 years, in representation of five clubs.

== Career ==
Born in Sanlúcar de Barrameda, Cádiz, Andalusia, Rodríguez arrived at Real Betis at the age of 17. During his eight-year link with the club he would only appear in seven La Liga games – six coming in the 1988–89 season under the guidance of Eusebio Ríos, who was sacked after the 13th round – also being loaned twice, successively to Recreativo de Huelva and CD Badajoz, helping the latter win the Segunda División B championship, albeit without promotion.

Rodríguez signed for Hércules CF in the 1991 summer, being instrumental as the team returned to Segunda División in his second year, with 32 goals scored. After netting four times in as many games into 1993–94, he returned to the top level with Rayo Vallecano, signing for €300.000; he only managed to score once during the campaign, and the Madrid outskirts side suffered relegation.

After helping Rayo immediately regain its lost status, Rodríguez returned to Hércules and achieved the same feat, scoring 14 goals from 30 appearances as the Alicante team returned to the top flight. He only added one, however, one in the following season – in a 3–2 away win against FC Barcelona on 13 January 1997 – in an eventual relegation.

Rodríguez retired from football in June 1998 at the age of 32. After briefly working with main club Hércules in directorial capacities, he lost all connection to the football world, remaining in Alicante.

== Honours ==
Badajoz

- Segunda División B: 1990–91

Hércules

- Segunda División: 1995–96

Individual

- Segunda División B top scorer: 1992–93
