= Juan Carlos Oliva =

Spanish football manager (born 1965)

Personal information
- Full name: Juan Carlos Oliva Fornos
- Date of birth: 4 January 1965 (age 61)
- Place of birth: Mequinenza, Spain
- Position: Defender

Managerial career
- Years: Team
- 1990–1991: Lleida (youth)
- 1991–1993: Lleida B
- 1993–1995: Tremp
- 1995–1997: Balaguer
- 1997–1999: Fraga
- 1999: Binéfar
- 2000–2001: Tremp
- 2001–2004: Fraga
- 2004–2005: Barbastro
- 2005–2006: Alavés (assistant)
- 2006: Alavés
- 2006–2007: Hospitalet
- 2007: Aris
- 2007–2008: Villarreal B
- 2008–2009: Recreativo (assistant)
- 2009–2010: Salamanca
- 2010–2011: Gimnàstic
- 2012–2013: Al-Ahli (assistant)
- 2013–2014: Al Ain (assistant)
- 2016–2018: Espanyol (assistant)
- 2018: Omonia
- 2019: Lleida Esportiu
- 2019: Watford (assistant)

Juan Carlos Oliva Fornos (born 4 January 1965) is a Spanish football manager.

== Football career ==
Born in Mequinenza, Province of Zaragoza, Aragon, Oliva started coaching at an early age, his beginnings being in amateur football. In 2005 he arrived at Deportivo Alavés, being initially an assistant.

In early 2006, Oliva was appointed at the first team following the sacking of Chuchi Cos, being in charge for five games – three wins, one draw and only one loss, against FC Barcelona – before being dismissed himself by eccentric club chairman Dmitry Piterman. Alavés would finally suffer relegation from La Liga.

Returned to the third level with CE L'Hospitalet, Oliva led the Catalans to the fourth position in the regular season and the subsequent promotion playoffs, which ended without success. After a few months in Greece with Aris Thessaloniki FC, he returned to his country and its division three, being one of three managers for Villarreal CF B as the Valencian side finished in midtable.

Oliva returned to the top flight in 2008–09, acting as assistant for Manolo Zambrano's successor Lucas Alcaraz as Recreativo de Huelva finally ranked in the 20th and last position. In late January 2010 he was fired by UD Salamanca, but the Castile and León club finally managed to stay afloat in the second tier.

On 6 December 2010, Oliva joined Gimnàstic de Tarragona of the second division, replacing the dismissed Luis César Sampedro as the team ranked in last position. He managed to finally lead them out of the relegation zone, notably with a 3–1 home win against eventual champions Real Betis on 15 May 2011.

After 11 matches without one win in 2011–12, Oliva was relieved of his duties at Nàstic. Subsequently, he had a series of spells as assistant manager under Quique Sánchez Flores.

On 18 June 2018, Oliva was appointed at Cypriot club AC Omonia. On 22 October, after three consecutive league defeats, he was sacked.

On 5 February 2019, Oliva joined Lleida Esportiu. He left by mutual consent in June, after failing in his objective of reaching the play-offs.

On 10 September 2019, Oliva was named in Sánchez Flores's staff at Watford.

== Managerial statistics ==
As of 18 May 2019

Managerial record by team and tenure
Team	Nat	From	To	Record								Ref.
Team	Nat	From	To	G	W	D	L	GF	GA	GD	Win %	Ref.
Lleida B	(Spain)	30 June 1991	1 July 1993	68	32	17	19	115	69	+46	47.06	
Tremp	(Spain)	1 July 1993	6 June 1995	72	37	23	12	117	71	+46	51.39	
Balaguer	(Spain)	6 June 1995	1 July 1997	78	28	19	31	92	105	−13	35.90	
Fraga	(Spain)	1 July 1997	1 June 1999	82	41	18	23	159	86	+73	50.00	
Binéfar	(Spain)	1 June 1999	31 October 1999	11	3	2	6	13	10	+3	27.27	
Tremp	(Spain)	1 July 2000	26 June 2001	34	13	6	15	54	55	−1	38.24	
Fraga	(Spain)	26 June 2001	1 July 2004	132	71	26	35	208	129	+79	53.79	
Barbastro	(Spain)	1 July 2004	30 June 2005	42	22	11	9	64	37	+27	52.38	
Alavés	(Spain)	10 January 2006	16 February 2006	5	3	1	1	10	7	+3	60.00	
Hospitalet	(Spain)	14 June 2006	12 June 2007	40	16	14	10	43	38	+5	40.00	
Aris	(Greece)	14 June 2007	4 September 2007	1	0	1	0	0	0	+0	0.00	
Villarreal B	(Spain)	22 October 2007	13 January 2008	11	4	3	4	11	11	+0	36.36	
Salamanca	(Spain)	23 June 2009	26 January 2010	25	9	8	8	31	33	−2	36.00	
Gimnàstic	(Spain)	6 December 2010	30 October 2011	39	10	11	18	32	54	−22	25.64	
Omonia	(Cyprus)	18 June 2018	22 October 2018	5	2	0	3	2	4	−2	40.00	
Lleida Esportiu	(Spain)	5 February 2019	3 June 2019	15	5	3	7	13	13	+0	33.33	
Total				660	296	163	201	964	722	+242	44.85	—
