= Higinio Ortúzar =

Chilean footballer (1915–1982)

Personal information
- Full name: Higinio Ortúzar Santamaría
- Date of birth: January 10, 1915
- Place of birth: Santiago, Chile
- Date of death: November 8, 1982 (aged 67)
- Place of death: Getxo, Spain
- Positions: Defender; midfielder

Senior career*
Years	Team	Apps	(Gls)
1935	Erandio		
1935–1939	Barakaldo		
1936	→ Racing Santander (loan)	0	(0)
1939–1943	Athletic Bilbao	70	(0)
1943–1947	Valencia	61	(1)
1947–1948	Valladolid	13	(0)
1948–1949	Real Sociedad	7	(0)

Managerial career
- 1949–1951: Logroñés
- 1952–1953: Cádiz
- 1954–1955: Logroñés
- 1955–1956: Caudal
- 1956–1957: Cultural Leonesa
- 1957–1959: Indautxu
- 1959–1960: Avilés
- 1962–1963: Burgos
- 1964: Salamanca
- 1964–1965: Logroñés
- * Club domestic league appearances and goals

Higinio Ortúzar Santamaría (10 January 1915 – 8 November 1982) was a Chilean footballer who made his entire career in Spain.

== Career ==
The first Chilean in the Spanish football, he made his debut for Erandio Club in 1935, and next he played for Barakaldo CF, Athletic Bilbao, Valencia CF, Real Valladolid and Real Sociedad. He was loaned to Racing de Santander in 1936 for 4,500 pesetas, but he couldn't play due to the Spanish coup of July.

While at Athletic (one of few players born outside the Basque region to play for the club under their signing policy and the only from Chile in the history), he won a League and Cup double in 1943, and followed this up with further league titles playing for Valencia in 1944 and 1947. In his 30s he featured for Valladolid and Real Sociedad in successive seasons, helping each to gain promotion from the second tier.

After retiring as a player, he became a football coach, and managed sides including CD Logroñés.

== Personal life ==
Born in Santiago, Chile, his parents were Basques. He returned to Euzkadi at early age, after his mother died.

He made his home in Areeta and managed a bar in Mayor Street.
