= Marcial García Arroyo =

Spanish football footballer, manager, physical educator, and gym owner

Personal information
- Full name: Marcial García Arroyo
- Birth name: Marcial García Arroyo
- Date of birth: 6 March 1930
- Place of birth: Toledo, Spain
- Date of death: 20 March 2021 (aged 91)
- Place of death: Talavera de la Reina, Spain
- Position: Defender

Senior career*
Years	Team	Apps	(Gls)
1946–1948	CF Alcázar		
1948–195?	CD Toledo		

Managerial career
- 1960–1961: UD Santa Bárbara
- 1961–1962: CD Logroñés
- 1963: Deportivo Alavés
- 1963–1964: Club Hispania de Almería
- 1964–1965: Béjar
- 1966–1967: Real Unión
- 1967–1968: CD Logroñés
- 1969–1971: UD Plasencia
- 1971–1972: Béjar
- 1972–1973: Talavera CF
- 1973–1974: CF Salmantino
- 1976–1977: SD Ponferradina
- 1977–1978: Talavera CF
- 1981–1982: SD Gimnástica Arandina
- 1982–1983: CD Toledo
- ?: Real Ávila CF
- 2014–2015: CD Pueblanueva
- * Club domestic league appearances and goals

Marcial García Arroyo (6 March 1930 – 20 March 2021) was a Spanish footballer who played as a defender for CD Toledo and a manager, taking charge of several Tercera División sides, such as CD Logroñés, Deportivo Alavés, and Real Unión in the 1960s. During his time as a coach, he discovered a few international players, such as José Carrete in Salmantino, Isidro, who became a Real Madrid player.

In addition to football, he was also a physical education teacher and a gym owner. He was one of the greatest promoters of sport throughout Castilla-La Mancha and more specifically in Talavera, where he lived much of his life.

== Early life ==
García Arroyo was born on 6 March 1930 in Toledo, and like any boy, he started hitting the ball as a child in the old fields of Don Gregorio, but in his youth, he also practiced swimming, athletics and even boxing.

== Football career ==
=== Playing career ===
García Arroyo began his football career at CF Alcázar in 1946, at the age of 16, with whom he played for two seasons before being signed by CD Toledo in 1948, making his debut against Segoviana. He played as a right defender, but in Toledo, he ended up playing as a center back. At some point in the early 1950s, in a match against CD Manchego, the player Cortés seriously injured him, with a broken tibia and fibula. He was out for a year and since Cortés had not done it with bad intentions, he began to visit Marcial during his convalescence, and during these visits, he met his sister and later the two married. This injury was most likely the reason behind his premature retirement.

== Managerial career ==
At the age of 25, García Arroyo obtained the regional coach card, and began his managerial career at UD Santa Bárbara in 1960, at the age of 30, which he coached for one season before signing for CD Logroñés. At the time, he was the youngest coach in Spain. He made his debut as Logroñés' coach on 2 September 1961, in a Tercera División match against his future club Real Unión, which ended in a 0–3 loss. After this initial defeat, however, the team found its rhythm and ended the season in second place with 46 points, thus achieving promotion to the Segunda División.

This feat caught the attention of bigger clubs, such as Deportivo Alavés, then in the second division, who signed him in the summer of 1963, making his debut in a pre-season friendly match against his former club Logroñés at the Campo de Las Gaunas on 25 August 1963, which ended in a 1–2 loss, which caused him to receive his first criticism from the Alava press and Albiazule fans. In the second friendly on 1 September, Alavés drew 2–2 against another third division side SD Amorebieta, and to finalize the team's preparation, García Arroyo organized a mini-tour of Ciudad Real and Madrid, losing 0–5 to Calvo Sotelo Puertollano CF, which had a squad full of Basque footballers, and then losing 0–1 to yet another third division side Rayo Vallecano. García Arroyo was not even able to make his official debut because he was fired on 13 September, just 48 hours before the start of the 1963–64 league season, being replaced by Juan Urquizu, who in turn was replaced by Manolín at the beginning of the second round in what turned out to be a disastrous season for Alavés, who was relegated to the Third Division with only four wins.

García Arroyo then took charge of Club Hispania de Almería (1963–64), Béjar (1964–65), and Real Unión (1966–67), leading the latter two clubs to a promotion to the second division, but like Logroñés and Alavés, he left before he could finally make his debut there. After Unión, he returned to Logroñés, which was back in the third division, but this time the club finished in eight with 31 points, coaching his last Logroñés match against Mondragón CF on 28 April 1968, which ended in a 4–0 win. He later recalled that during his time at Logroñés, he received 40,000 pesetas as a token and 5,000 pesetas in salary.

In 1969, García Arroyo was then appointed to the helm of UD Plasencia, when the team played in group 8 of the Third Division, and although he could not avoid relegation despite being tenth (that year 12 of the 20 teams were relegated), he decided to continue one more season, now in the Extremadura Preferential Regional, in which Plasencia finished fifth. He went on to manage Béjar (1971–72), Talavera CF (1972–73), CF Salmantino (1973–74), SD Ponferradina (1976–77), Talavera CF (1977–78), SD Gimnástica Arandina (1981–82), and CD Toledo (1982–83), but he was unable to last any longer than a single season in any of them. He was a sports commentator on La Voz del Tajo at the end of the 80s. He also coached Real Ávila CF and in 2014, at the age of 84, he was appointed as manager of Toledo-based CD Pueblanueva.

== Outside football ==
In addition to football, García Arroyo was also a physical education teacher and the owner of his gym on Gaspar Duque de Guzmán Street. For twelve years he visited Colombia, through Coldeportes, to give a series of courses and conferences, most notably to national coaches. Between 1973 and 1975 he was director of the Colombian Coaching School with a scholarship from the DND.

As of 2011, he was holding the position of director of the Talavera Coaching School, within the Toledo subdelegation.

== Death ==
García Arroyo died in Talavera de la Reina on 20 March 2021, at the age of 91. His funeral took place on the following day at 11 am.
