= Manuel Echezarreta =

Spanish footballer and manager

Manolo Echezarreta
Personal information
- Full name: Manuel Echezarreta Tellechea
- Date of birth: 4 October 1915
- Place of birth: Irún, Spain
- Date of death: 17 October 1980 (aged 65)
- Position: Midfielder

Senior career*
Years	Team	Apps	(Gls)
- Real Unión
1940–1941	Osasuna	16	(3)
1941–1942	Real Unión	2	(1)
1942–1943	Alavés	0	(0)

Managerial career
- 1954–1956: Alavés
- 1956–1958: Málaga
- 1958: Hércules
- 1959: Sabadell
- 1959–1960: Alavés
- 1963–1965: Real Unión
- 1967–1968: Logroñés
- * Club domestic league appearances and goals

Manuel "Manolo" Echezarreta Tellechea (4 October 1915 — 17 October 1980) was a Spanish football player and manager.
