= Luisín =

Spanish footballer and manager

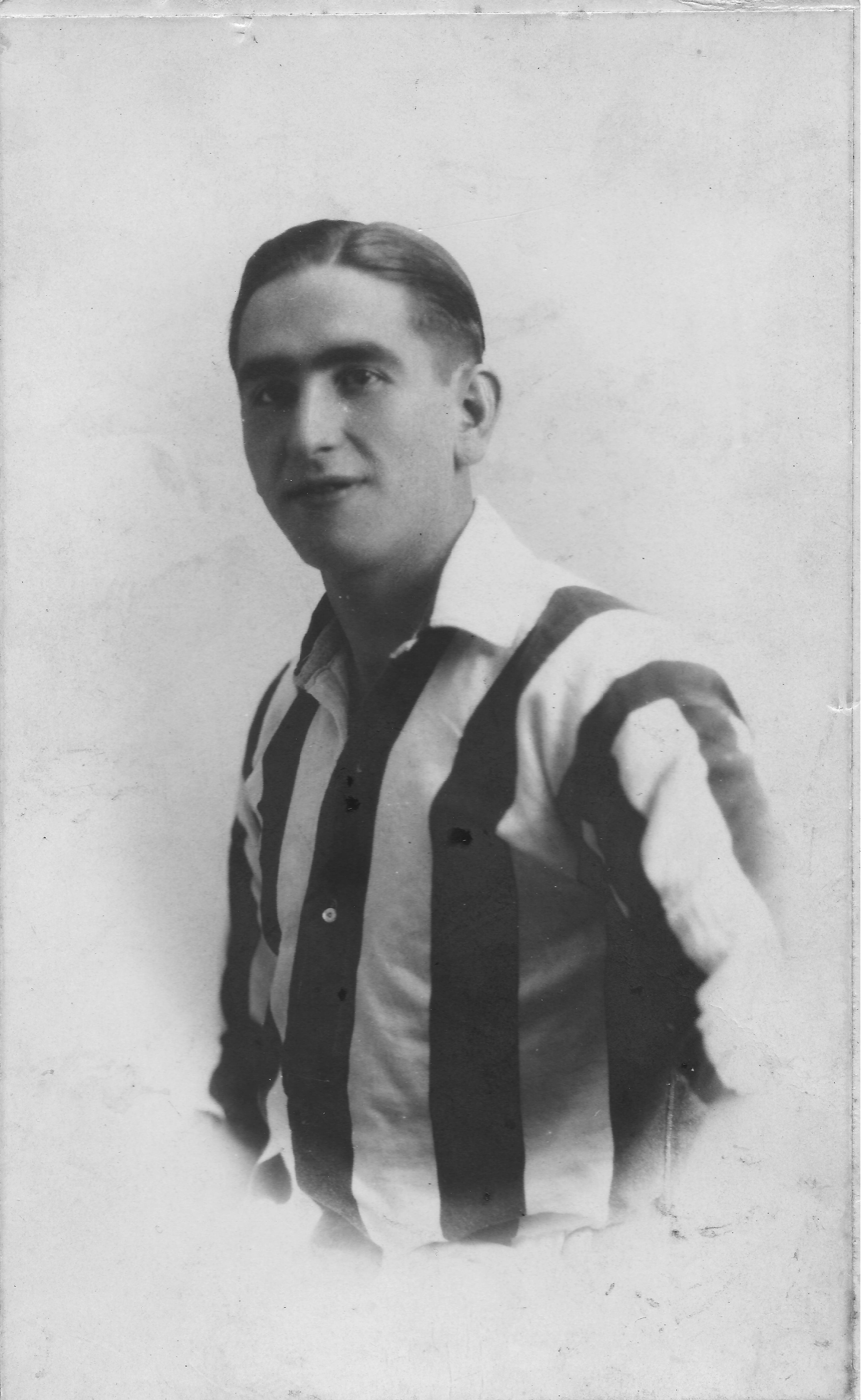

Personal information
- Full name: José Luis Rodríguez Menéndez
- Date of birth: 11 May 1910
- Place of birth: Mieres, Spain
- Date of death: 21 March 1990 (aged 79)
- Place of death: Burgos, Spain
- Position: Forward

Youth career
- 1924–1926: Caudal Deportivo
- 1926–1927: Real Oviedo

Senior career*
Years	Team	Apps	(Gls)
1927–1933	Club Deportivo Logrones		
1933–1935	Real Oviedo		
1935–1936	Sevilla FC		
1940–1941	Club Deportivo Logrones		

Managerial career
- 1941–1943: Club Deportivo Logrones
- 1945–1949: Deportivo Maestranza Aérea
- 1950–1954: Logroño Recreación Club
- 1954–1955: Caudal Deportivo
- 1955–1956: Club Deportivo Logrones
- * Club domestic league appearances and goals

José Luis Rodríguez Menéndez ( 11 May 1910 in Mieres, Asturias – 21 March 1990 in Burgos), better known as Luisín, was a Spanish football striker and manager. In a 10-season professional career, between 1927 and 1941, he played for Caudal de Mieres, Club Deportivo Logroño, Real Oviedo and Sevilla FC. He also played for Asturias and Gipúzcoa and he was even preselected by the Spain national football team before 1934 FIFA World Cup.

As a manager, he coached Club Deportivo Logrones, Deportivo Maestranza Aérea, Logroño Recreación Club and Caudal Deportivo.
