= Julio Bañuelos =

Spanish footballer and manager

Personal information
- Full name: Julio Bañuelos Sáez
- Date of birth: 7 December 1970 (age 55)
- Place of birth: Miranda de Ebro, Spain
- Height: 1.83 m (6 ft 0 in)
- Position: Defender

Youth career
- Real Madrid

Senior career*
Years	Team	Apps	(Gls)
1988–1990	Mirandés	57	(6)
1990–1993	Zaragoza B	87	(3)
1993–1994	Maspalomas	21	(1)
1994–1995	Badalona		
1995–2001	Balaguer		

Managerial career
- 2001–2002: Lleida (youth)
- 2002–2005: Alavés (youth)
- 2005–2006: Alavés B
- 2006: Alavés
- 2008: Alavés
- 2008–2010: Mirandés
- 2011: Burgos
- 2013: Olot
- 2014–2016: AEK Larnaca (assistant)
- 2016–2017: APOEL (assistant)
- 2017–2018: Leeds United (assistant)
- 2018–2019: Indonesia (assistant)
- 2019: Persija Jakarta
- * Club domestic league appearances and goals

Julio Bañuelos (born 7 December 1970) is a Spanish retired footballer who played as a defender, He has managed clubs including Alavés and Burgos. He was a graduate of the Barcelona academy. He was head coach at Persebaya Surabaya and an assistant coach at Leeds United. He is now Director of Coaching and Coach of the 2008 first team at Brooklyn United academy as well as several other teams at the club.

== Club career ==
Born in Miranda de Ebro, Burgos, Castile and León, Bañuelos was a Real Madrid youth graduate. He subsequently represented CD Mirandés, Real Zaragoza B, CD Maspalomas, CF Badalona and CF Balaguer, never playing in a higher level than the Segunda División B.

== Coaching career ==
After his retirement Bañuelos was appointed manager at UE Lleida's youth setup. On 25 April 2001 he moved to Deportivo Alavés, also in charge of the youth sides.

On 5 June 2006, after a spell at the latter's reserve team, Bañuelos was appointed at the helm of the main squad in Segunda División. On 6 September, however, he was relieved from his duties after only two league matches in charge, due to "personal reasons". He was reappointed as the Manager of Alavés in 2008.

In August 2008 Bañuelos was named CD Mirandés manager. He had a successful spell and gained Promotion, after bringing the club back to Segunda División B at first attempt, he left the club in 2010.

On 6 April 2011 Bañuelos was appointed at Burgos CF, and after bringing the club back to the third level, was sacked on 4 October. On 15 January 2013 he joined UE Olot, being relieved from his duties on 10 June.

On 23 May 2014 Bañuelos moved abroad for the first time in his career, being named Thomas Christiansen's assistant at AEK Larnaca F.C. His time at the club saw AEK finish 2nd during the 2014/15 and 2015/16 seasons. Two years later, he followed Christiansen to Cypriot First Division champions APOEL FC. Where he won the Cypriot First Division in his first season, as well as reaching the Cypriot Cup Final, where they finished runners up, the club also reached the Last 16 of the UEFA Europa League. On 27 May 2017, Bañuelos parted company with the club.

He was named Leeds United assistant head coach on Monday 19 June 2017. Bañuelos left the club when Christiansen was dismissed on 4 February 2018, after a poor run of results and with the team tenth in the table.

== Managerial statistics ==
As of 19 September 2019

Managerial record by team and tenure
Team	From	To	Record							
Team	From	To	G	W	D	L	GF	GA	GD	Win %
Persija Jakarta	8 June 2019	19 September 2019	18	5	8	5	20	21	−1	27.78
Career total			18	5	8	5	20	21	−1	27.78
