= 1993 Segunda División B play-offs =

Spanish football league play-offs

The 1993 Segunda División B play-offs (Playoffs de Ascenso or Promoción de Ascenso) were the final playoffs for promotion from 1992–93 Segunda División B to the 1993–94 Segunda División. The four first placed teams in each of the four Segunda División B groups played the Playoffs de Ascenso and the four last placed teams in Segunda División were relegated to Segunda División B.

The teams play a league of four teams, divided into 4 groups. The champion of each group is promoted to Segunda División.

== Group A ==
Pos	Team	Pld	W	D	L	GF	GA	GD	Pts	Qualification or relegation
1	Toledo	6	5	0	1	16	8	+8	10	Promotion to Segunda División
2	Alavés	6	4	1	1	12	6	+6	9	
3	Jaén	6	1	2	3	5	10	−5	4	
4	Sant Andreu	6	0	1	5	5	14	−9	1	

Source: BDFútbol
Rules for classification: 1) points; 2) head-to-head points; 3) head-to-head goal difference; 4) goal difference; 5) number of goals scored

=== Results ===
Home \ Away	ALA	JAE	STA	TOL
Alavés	—	2–0	2–0	2–3
Jaén	2–2	—	2–1	1–2
Sant Andreu	1–2	0–0	—	2–4
Toledo	0–2	3–0	4–1	—

Source: BDFútbol
Legend: Blue = home team win; Yellow = draw; Red = away team win.

== Group B ==
Pos	Team	Pld	W	D	L	GF	GA	GD	Pts	Qualification or relegation
1	Leganés	6	4	2	0	12	3	+9	10	Promotion to Segunda División
2	Elche	6	3	2	1	5	5	0	8	
3	Palencia	6	1	1	4	5	10	−5	3 (Note: Palencia finished ahead of Xerez on head-to-head points: Xerez–Palencia 2–2, Palencia–Xerez 3–1)	
4	Xerez	6	0	3	3	6	10	−4	3	

Source: BDFútbol
Rules for classification: 1) points; 2) head-to-head points; 3) head-to-head goal difference; 4) goal difference; 5) number of goals scored

=== Results ===
Home \ Away	ELC	LEG	PAL	XER
Elche	—	1–1	1–0	1–0
Leganés	3–0	—	2–0	2–1
Palencia	0–1	0–3	—	3–1
Xerez	1–1	1–1	2–2	—

Source: BDFútbol
Legend: Blue = home team win; Yellow = draw; Red = away team win.

== Group C ==
Pos	Team	Pld	W	D	L	GF	GA	GD	Pts	Qualification or relegation
1	Hércules	6	5	1	0	12	4	+8	11	Promotion to Segunda División
2	Salamanca	6	3	0	3	6	7	−1	6	
3	Las Palmas	6	2	1	3	7	8	−1	5	
4	Gimnástica Torrelavega	6	0	2	4	5	11	−6	2	

Source: BDFútbol
Rules for classification: 1) points; 2) head-to-head points; 3) head-to-head goal difference; 4) goal difference; 5) number of goals scored

=== Results ===
Home \ Away	GIM	HER	LPA	SAL
Gimnástica Torrelavega	—	2–2	1–1	1–2
Hércules	1–0	—	4–1	1–0
Las Palmas	3–0	0–2	—	0–1
Salamanca	2–1	1–2	0–2	—

Source: BDFútbol
Legend: Blue = home team win; Yellow = draw; Red = away team win.

== Group D ==
Pos	Team	Pld	W	D	L	GF	GA	GD	Pts	Qualification or relegation
1	Murcia	6	4	0	2	10	7	+3	8	Promotion to Segunda División
2	Getafe	6	2	2	2	6	7	−1	6 (Note: Getafe finished ahead of Barakaldo on head-to-head points: Getafe–Barakaldo 3–1, Barakaldo–Getafe 1–1)	
3	Barakaldo	6	2	2	2	10	9	+1	6	
4	Granada	6	1	2	3	4	7	−3	4	

Source: BDFútbol
Rules for classification: 1) points; 2) head-to-head points; 3) head-to-head goal difference; 4) goal difference; 5) number of goals scored

=== Results ===
Home \ Away	BAR	GET	GRA	MUR
Barakaldo	—	1–1	0–0	4–2
Getafe	3–1	—	0–0	2–0
Granada	1–4	2–0	—	0–1
Murcia	2–0	3–0	2–1	—

Source: BDFútbol
Legend: Blue = home team win; Yellow = draw; Red = away team win.
