= Pedro Cordero (footballer) =

Spanish footballer (born 1968)

Personal information
- Full name: Pedro Ignacio Cordero Sánchez
- Date of birth: 17 August 1968 (age 58)
- Place of birth: Cartagena, Spain
- Height: 1.76 m (5 ft 9 in)
- Position: Midfielder

Senior career*
Years	Team	Apps	(Gls)
1986–1987	Cartagena FC	20	(3)
1987–1989	Real Murcia	44	(2)
1989–1990	Salamanca	32	(3)
1990–1993	Cartagena FC	92	(23)
1993–1995	Albacete Balompié	52	(5)
1995–1997	Badajoz	34	(4)
1997–1998	Toledo	41	(3)
1998–1999	Castellón	34	(5)
2000	Cacereño	16	(0)
2000	Ciudad de Murcia		
2001–2002	Cartagonova	46	(2)
Total		411	(50)
- * Club domestic league appearances and goals

Pedro Ignacio Cordero Sánchez (born 17 August 1968) is a Spanish former footballer who played as a midfielder, and is now the sporting director of Real Murcia. He made 44 appearances for Murcia in La Liga in the 1980s, and a further 52 for Albacete Balompié in the 1990s.

== Club career ==
=== Cartagena FC ===
Cordero was born in Cartagena in the Region of Murcia, and began his career with local side Cartagena FC. He made his debut for the Segunda División club at the age of 18, in a 1–0 home win over Sestao Sport on 17 December 1986. He came on as a substitute for Jesús Crespo with 12 minutes remaining. He made his first start in a 4–0 away loss to Real Oviedo at Estadio Carlos Tartiere on 11 January, and two weeks later he scored his first goal in a 2–1 away win over Hércules at Estadio José Rico Pérez.

This earned him his first home start, which came on 1 February in a 2–1 win over Recreativo de Huelva. He made 20 appearances that season, and scored twice more.

=== Real Murcia ===
Cordero's fine performances with Cartagena earned him a move to the region's top team, La Liga side Real Murcia. He made his top flight debut in the first match of the 1987–88 season, a 1–0 away defeat at the hands of Osasuna at Estadio El Sadar on 30 August. A week later, he marked his home debut with a goal in a 2–1 win over Las Palmas at Estadio de La Condomina. At the end of the season, Murcia found themselves 17th in the table, and so faced a relegation playoff.

In the home first leg against Rayo Vallecano, Murcia grasped a 2–0 lead just before the hour mark, with goals from Salvo Mejías and Juanjo. Cordero was brought on in place of Eugenio with 15 minutes left, and Murcia put themselves in a commanding position with a third goal from Manolo just before the end. Cordero started in the return match at Vallecas, and despite a second half own goal by José Luis Brown, Murcia held a 3–1 aggregate lead as the match entered its closing stages. The icing on the cake was Cordero's third goal of the season arriving in injury time, as Murcia retained their La Liga status with a 4–1 aggregate victory.

The following season, Cordero was less heavily used, playing only 16 matches. It was another tough season for Murcia, who ended the season in 19th place, meaning they were relegated directly, without the opportunity for redemption offered by a playoff. Cordero departed the club at the end of the season, his last Murcia appearance being a 1–0 home loss to Cádiz on 25 June.

=== Salamanca ===
Like Murcia, Cordero descended to the Segunda División in 1989–90 Segunda División, but he joined divisional rivals Salamanca. His debut came in a 1–0 away loss to Racing Santander at El Sardinero on 17 September, and he made his home debut four days later in the first round of the Copa del Rey. Salamanca's tie with Recreativo de Huelva at Helmántico Stadium ended in a 2–2 draw, which eliminated the hosts thanks to a 2–1 loss in the first leg. His first goal for Salamanca came against the same opponents as his debut, Racing Santander, in the return fixture on 4 February. Cordero's eighth minute effort helped Salamanca to a 3–0 win. He made 33 appearances that season, but his time at Salamanca was to be just one season, and so the 1–0 loss away to Figueres on 27 May was his last outing for the club.

=== Return to Cartagena ===
In the summer of 1990, Cordero moved back to his first club, Cartagena. They had slipped back to Segunda División B in his absence, but his first season was a successful one. He played 46 matches as the club ended the year as runners-up in their group, missing out on the title to Barcelona Atlètic only on goal difference, and qualified for the promotion playoffs. Cordero played in five of the playoff matches, missing one due to suspension after a late red card at home to Córdoba. Cartagena finished their playoff group level on points with Racing Santander, but missed out on promotion thanks to inferior goal difference.

1991–92 was Cordero's busiest as a professional, as he made a huge 48 appearances for Cartagena. He also found excellent goal scoring form, scoring 21 times. He began the season with four goals, split evenly across the two legs of Cartagena's 9–1 Copa del Rey first round victory over Algar. He would score a brace on three further occasions that season: both goals in a 2–0 away win over Torrent on 15 September, again both goals in a 2–0 home win against Valdepeñas on 8 March, and, including a penalty, in a 4–0 away win over Alzira on 26 April. This form helped Cartagena go one place better than the year before: they were champions of their group, and qualified for the playoffs once again.

Cartagena began the playoffs with two wins and a draw from their first four matches, with Cordero finding the net in the 2–0 home win over Deportivo Alavés. A further 2–0 win at home against Badajoz left the two clubs tied on points, meaning a draw in the return fixture would earn Cartagena promotion. Badajoz scored early through José Luis Sarabia, but Cordero equalised after 21 minutes to put Cartagena back in contention. However, Badajoz then took control of the game, and eventually ran out 5–1 winners, meaning Cartagena had failed at the final hurdle for the second year in a row.

Cordero continued to be a mainstay of the team the following season, and had played 30 matches by the end of January. His goal scoring form also continued, including scoring four goals in Cartagena's incredible 9–2 home victory over Llíria on 29 November. However, keen for a return to higher levels of football, he jumped ship as January became February. His last game for Cartagena was at home to Gimnàstic de Tarragona on 31 January, which he marked by scoring a late equaliser from the penalty spot, his 14th goal of the season.

=== Albacete Balompié ===
He returned to La Liga action in February 1993 after three and a half years in lower divisions by joining Albacete Balompié. He made his debut away to Real Sociedad at Anoeta Stadium on 14 February, coming on for José Luis Zalazar with three minutes left in the 2–1 defeat. His first start came a week later in a home fixture against Real Madrid at Estadio Carlos Belmonte, and it was an unflattering occasion as Cordero was sent off and the hosts were defeated 3–0. His third match, on 28 February, was more encouraging, as he scored his first Albacete goal in a 2–2 draw with Tenerife at Estadio Heliodoro Rodríguez López.

He scored once more - in a 2–2 draw with Rayo Vallecano at Vallecas on 13 June - in his ten appearances the season, but Albacete ended the season in 17th place and faced a relegation playoff. Cordero played in both legs of the tight tie with Real Mallorca, as Albacete survived a second leg loss to win 4–3 on aggregate and maintain their top flight status for another year. In 1993–94 he played 26 times and scored once, while the following season brought 28 appearances and three goals. The latter season saw Albacete place 17th again, yielding another playoff. Again, Cordero played in both legs, against his former club Salamanca, but this time Albacete lost, 5–2 on aggregate.

This should have brought relegation for Albacete, but they were reprieved after an administration scandal involving Sevilla and Celta Vigo. However, the playoffs would be Cordero's last appearances for the club, and he departed at the end of the season.

=== Badajoz ===
In tandem with his teammate Josep Sala, Cordero joined Badajoz in the Segunda División ahead of the 1995–96 season. He made his debut in the first match of the season, a 2–1 away loss to Lleida at Camp d'Esports on 3 September. A week later, he made his home debut in a 2–0 victory over Atlético Marbella. In his next match, on 17 September, he scored his first goal for the club as Badajoz secured a 3–1 away victory at Sestao Sport. He scored two more goals that season, both of which came in the same match, a 2–0 away win over Leganés on 15 October.

Despite regular appearances in the first half of the season, Cordero dropped out of the team before Christmas and ended the season having made just 17 appearances. The following season was only slightly better, as he played 20 matches, scoring three times. Seeking more regular playing time, Cordero left the club at the end of the season, meaning the astonishing 4–4 home draw with Atlético Madrid B on the last day of the season was his last match for Badajoz.

=== Toledo ===
Cordero signed for Badajoz's Segunda División rivals Toledo in the summer of 1997. He made his debut in their first match of the season, a 1–0 away win over Levante at Nou Estadi del Llevant on 30 August, and followed it up a week later with his home debut in another win, by the same scoreline, over Osasuna at Estadio Salto del Caballo. He scored his first goal for the club in a 1–1 draw with Villarreal at Estadio El Madrigal on 28 September, one of three he would score in his 37 appearances that year. One of these came in a 2–2 home draw with Las Palmas on 19 October, in which he also scored an own goal.

1998–99 began strongly, and Cordero played nine matches early in the season. However, he left the club that winter, and his last match for Toledo was a home fixture against Sevilla on 1 November. He came on for Roberto Suárez with 14 minutes to play as Toledo won 2–0.

=== Castellón ===
Cordero joined Segunda División B side CD Castellón in December 1998. He made his debut in a 3–1 away win over Sabadell at Estadi de la Nova Creu Alta, and he followed it up with his home debut a week later against Gimnàstic de Tarragona at Nou Estadi Castàlia. He marked the occasion with a goal, although it was only a consolation as Castellón lost 2–1. He scored again in the very next game, a 1–0 win over Terrassa at Estadi Olímpic on 19 December. He totalled 18 appearances that season, and scored once more, in a 3–1 home win over Gandía on 21 February. In 1999–2000, he played in 16 of Castellón's first 18 matches, scoring twice, but he once again moved clubs midseason. His last match for Castellón was a 0–0 away draw with Gandía on 18 December.

=== Cacereño ===
Cordero joined another Segunda División B club, Cacereño, in January 2000. His made his debut on 30 January, away at Melilla. He came on as a substitute at Estadio Álvarez Claro, replacing Manuel Ahumada, as Cacereño lost 2–0. He first start came a week later, as Cacereño earned a 1–0 home win over Coria at Estadio Príncipe Felipe. He ultimately played sixteen matches, but following a 2–2 home draw with Real Betis B on the last day of the season, Cacereño found themselves 18th in the table and were relegated to the Tercera División. His stay at Cacereño proved to be just six months, and he left the club that summer.

=== Ciudad de Murcia and Cartagonova ===
In the summer of 2000, Cordero returned to Estadio de La Condomina, scene of some of his greatest success with Real Murcia in the late 1980s. However, it was not Real he joined, but new club Ciudad de Murcia. Ciudad had been founded only twelve months before, and had won the Preferente Autonómica de la Región de Murcia title in their first season to earn promotion to the Tercera División. Cordero played with them during the 2000–01 season, in which they won another title and another promotion, but he left the club in the middle of the season to return to another old stomping ground.

Cordero then began his third spell in his home city of Cartagena, but again he joined a new club. His former club, Cartagena FC, had ceased play in 1997, and the city's main club was now Cartagonova, founded in 1995. Cordero made his debut for the Segunda División B club on 7 January 2001, in a 1–1 draw with Gimnàstic de Tarragona at Cartagonova's eponymous stadium. He made 17 appearances that season, and scored once, in a 2–0 home win over Gandía on 4 February. In 2001–02, he played 29 matches, again scoring a single goal, a consolation in a 2–1 home loss to Ceuta on 28 October.

At the end of the season he retired, just shy of his 34th birthday. His last professional game was a humiliating 4–0 loss against Melilla at Estadio Álvarez Claro on 19 May 2002.

== International career ==
Cordero received a call-up to the Spain U21 team for the 1988–89 season, but he did not play in any matches. He never had a call-up to the Spain national team.

== Non-playing career ==
Since his retirement, Cordero has had an extensive technical career with many clubs in Spain. His first such role was as the sporting director of Torrevieja, which he held during the 2006–07 Tercera División season. After a year out, he took up the same role with Águilas in 2008. He worked with the Segunda División B club for two seasons, but at the end of the latter season, the club was dissolved due to serious economic problems. He then joined Granada CF, working as a technical analyst under his brother Juan Carlos. He held this post during the 2010–11 Segunda División season, in which Granada earned promotion to La Liga for the first time since 1975–76 via the playoffs.

This success allowed Cordero to take on the more senior role of sporting director at Tenerife. He helped the club to second place in their group in the 2011–12 Segunda División B campaign, but their promotion dreams were dashed at the last hurdle in the playoffs by Ponferradina. He left the club following this failure, and returned to his previous role as a technical analyst at Granada. After an uneventful 2012–13 La Liga season, he left once again, becoming sporting director of Córdoba in December 2013.

Cordero guided Córdoba back to La Liga for the first time since 1971–72 at the first attempt, as they were promoted via the playoffs. However, they were relegated in last place after just one season in the top flight, and Cordero was fired in May 2015.

In the winter of 2016, Cordero joined forces with Quique Pina, who had been president of Ciudad de Murcia during his time there as a player, and also president of Granada during his time on the technical secretariat. Pina's latest project was with Lorca Deportiva, where he appointed Cordero as sporting director. He helped the club win their group in the 2016–17 Tercera División and earn promotion. He then resumed his association with his brother Juan Carlos, with whom he served on the technical secretariats at Granada and Cádiz, before both departed the latter in September 2018. The following month, he became a technical analyst in the scouting team at Elche, working with his other brother Jorge, but he left in December to become sporting director at Real Murcia.

== Personal life ==
Cordero is the eldest of three footballing brothers. Middle brother Juan Carlos, six years younger, played for a succession of Segunda División B clubs as a forward during the 1990s, and also made four Segunda División appearances for Écija Balompié during 1995–96. He also played for the Spain Under-20s in the 1993 Alcudia Trophy, appearing in matches against Georgia and Ukraine. He and Pedro worked together at both Granada CF and Cádiz after their playing careers.

Youngest brother Jorge, nine years Pedro's junior, was also a midfielder, and like Pedro his clubs included Cartagonova and Ciudad de Murcia. He also had a spell with Real Mallorca around the turn of the millennium, with whom he played twice in La Liga and appeared in the 2000 UEFA Intertoto Cup. Jorge later worked with Pedro at Elche.

In February 2016, Cordero launched his own restaurant in his hometown of Cartagena, called La Bodega Real. The opening night was attended by many celebrities including his brothers, former teammate and Tenerife colleague Manolo Sánchez, and Cartagena left winger Chus Hevia.

== Honours ==
=== Player ===
Cartagena FC

- Segunda División B: 1991–92

Ciudad de Murcia

- Tercera División: 2000–01

=== Sporting director ===
Córdoba

- Segunda División: promotion to La Liga 2013–14

Lorca Deportiva

- Tercera División: 2016–17

== Career statistics ==
As of 31 January 2021

Club	Season	League			Cup		Other		Total	
Club	Season	Division	Apps	Goals	Apps	Goals	Apps	Goals	Apps	Goals
Cartagena FC	1986–87	Segunda División	20	3	0	0	–	–	20	3
Real Murcia	1987–88	La Liga	28	2	1	0	2	1	31	3
Real Murcia	1988–89	La Liga	16	0	0	0	–	–	16	0
Real Murcia	Total		44	2	1	0	2	1	47	3
Salamanca	1989–90	Segunda División	32	3	1	0	–	–	33	3
Cartagena FC	1990–91	Segunda División B	36	2	5	3	5	0	46	5
Cartagena FC	1991–92	Segunda División B	34	13	8	6	6	2	48	21
Cartagena FC	1992–93	Segunda División B	22	8	8	6	–	–	30	14
Cartagena FC	Total		92	23	21	15	11	2	124	40
Cartagena FC total			112	26	21	15	11	2	144	43
Albacete Balompié	1992–93	La Liga	8	2	0	0	2	0	10	2
Albacete Balompié	1993–94	La Liga	25	1	1	0	–	–	26	1
Albacete Balompié	1994–95	La Liga	19	2	7	1	2	0	28	3
Albacete Balompié	Total		52	5	8	1	4	0	64	6
Badajoz	1995–96	Segunda División	15	3	2	0	–	–	17	3
Badajoz	1996–97	Segunda División	19	1	1	1	–	–	20	2
Badajoz	Total		34	4	3	1	0	0	37	5
Toledo	1997–98	Segunda División	34	3	3	0	–	–	37	3
Toledo	1998–99	Segunda División	7	0	2	0	–	–	9	0
Toledo	Total		41	3	5	0	0	0	46	3
Castellón	1998–99	Segunda División B	18	3	–	–	–	–	18	3
Castellón	1999–2000	Segunda División B	16	2	–	–	–	–	16	2
Castellón	Total		34	5	0	0	0	0	34	5
Cacereño	1999–2000	Segunda División B	16	0	–	–	–	–	16	0
Cartagonova	2000–01	Segunda División B	17	1	–	–	–	–	17	1
Cartagonova	2001–02	Segunda División B	29	1	–	–	–	–	29	1
Cartagonova	Total		46	2	0	0	0	0	46	2
Career total			411	50	39	17	17	3	467	70

1. Appearances in the 1987–88 La Liga relegation playoff
2. Appearances in the 1991 Segunda División B playoffs
3. Appearances in the 1992 Segunda División B playoffs
4. Appearances in the 1992–93 La Liga relegation playoff
5. Appearances in the 1994–95 La Liga relegation playoff
