= 1991 Tercera División play-offs =

Spanish football league play-offs

The 1991 Tercera División play-offs to Segunda División B from Tercera División (Promotion play-offs) were the final playoffs for the promotion from 1990–91 Tercera División to 1991–92 Segunda División B. The champion of every group (excluding reserve teams) took part in the play-off.

The teams play a league of four teams, divided into 17 groups of 5 zones.

- Zone A: 4 groups with teams of Comunidad de Madrid (3ª Gr. 7), Galicia (3ª Gr. 1), Asturias (3ª Gr. 2) & Castilla y León (3ª Gr. 8).
- Zone B: 4 groups with teams of Aragón (3ª Gr. 16), País Vasco (3ª Gr. 4), Navarra+La Rioja (3ª Gr. 15) & Cantabria (3ª Gr. 3).
- Zone C: 4 groups with teams of Región de Murcia (3ª Gr. 13), Baleares (3ª Gr. 11), Comunidad Valenciana (3ª Gr. 6) & Cataluña (3ª Gr. 5).
- Zone D: 4 groups with teams of Extremadura (3ª Gr. 14), Castilla-La Mancha (3ª Gr. 17) & Andalucía (3ª Gr. 9 & 10)
- Zone E: 1 group with teams of Islas Canarias (3ª Gr. 12).

The champion of each group is promoted to Segunda División B.

== Group A1 ==
Pos	Team	Pld	W	D	L	GF	GA	GD	Pts
1	Fabril Deportivo	6	3	3	0	9	5	+4	9
2	Caudal Deportivo	6	3	2	1	10	6	+4	8
3	CF Fuenlabrada	6	2	0	4	14	9	+5	4
4	SD Almazán	6	1	1	4	7	20	−13	3

Promoted to Segunda División B

=== Results ===
1st Match
2:2	Fabril - Almazán
2:1	Caudal - Fuenlabrada

2nd Match
2:2	Fabril - Caudal
3:1	Almazán - Fuenlabrada

3rd Match
0:1	Fuenlabrada - Fabril
4:0	Caudal - Almazán

4th Match
1:2	Almazán - Fabril
3:0	Fuenlabrada - Caudal

5th Match
2:0	Fabril - Fuenlabrada
0:2	Almazán - Caudal

6th Match
2:2	Caudal - Fabril
9:1	Fuenlabrada - Almazán

== Group A2 ==
Pos	Team	Pld	W	D	L	GF	GA	GD	Pts
1	CD Lalín	6	4	0	2	16	6	+10	8
2	Zamora CF	6	4	0	2	12	7	+5	8
3	Atlético Valdemoro	6	2	0	4	8	15	−7	4
4	Pumarín CF	6	2	0	4	6	14	−8	4

Promoted to Segunda División B

=== Results ===
1st Match
2:1	Pumarín - Valdemoro
1:0	Lalín - Zamora

2nd Match
2:0	Pumarín - Lalín
0:2	Valdemoro - Zamora

3rd Match
5:0	Lalín - Valdemoro
3:0	Zamora - Pumarín

4th Match
3:1	Valdemoro - Pumarín
1:4	Zamora - Lalín

5th Match
3:2	Valdemoro - Lalín
1:3	Pumarín - Zamora

6th Match
4:0	Lalín - Pumarín
3:1	Zamora - Valdemoro

== Group A3 ==
Pos	Team	Pld	W	D	L	GF	GA	GD	Pts
1	CD Mosconia	6	4	2	0	7	3	+4	10
2	Real Madrid C	6	3	0	3	11	9	+2	6
3	Bergantiños FC	6	1	2	3	8	11	−3	4
4	Atlético Burgalés	6	1	2	3	5	8	−3	4

Promoted to Segunda División B

=== Results ===
1st Match
1:2	Bergantiños - Real Madrid C
1:0	Mosconia - At. Burgalés

2nd Match
1:1	Bergantiños - Mosconia
4:1	R. Madrid C - At. Burgalés

3rd Match
1:0	Mosconia - R. Madrid C
0:0	At. Burgales - Bergantiños

4th Match
4:2	Real Madrid C - Bergantiños
0:0	At. Burgalés - Mosconia

5th Match
1:2	Real Madrid C - Mosconia
3:2	Bergantiños - At. Burgalés

6th Match
2:1	Mosconia - Bergantiños
2:0	At. Burgalés - Real Madrid C

== Group A4 ==
Pos	Team	Pld	W	D	L	GF	GA	GD	Pts
1	R. Valladolid Promesas	6	5	1	0	14	2	+12	11
2	SD Burela	6	4	1	1	7	3	+4	9
3	Club Hispano	6	2	0	4	4	6	−2	4
4	AD Parla	6	0	0	6	1	15	−14	0

Promoted to Segunda División B

=== Results ===
1st Match
2:0	Valladolid Pr. - Hispano
2:0	Burela - Parla

2nd Match
1:0	Valladolid Pr. - Burela
3:1	Hispano - Parla

3rd Match
1:0	Burela - Hispano
0:1	Parla - Valladolid Pr.

4th Match
0:1	Hispano - Valladolid Pr.
0:1	Parla - Burela

5th Match
0:1	Hispano - Burela
7:0	Valladolid Pr. - Parla

6th Match
2:2	Burela - Valladolid Pr.
0:1	Parla - Hispano

== Group B1 ==
Pos	Team	Pld	W	D	L	GF	GA	GD	Pts
1	UD Fraga	6	2	4	0	7	3	+4	8
2	Peña Sport FC	6	1	4	1	5	5	0	6
3	SD Amorebieta	6	2	2	2	5	10	−5	6
4	SD Laredo	6	1	2	3	10	9	+1	4

Promoted to Segunda División B

=== Results ===
1st Match
4:0	Laredo - Amorebieta
0:0	Peña Sport - Fraga

2nd Match
0:0	Laredo - Peña Sport
0:1	Amorebieta - Fraga

3rd Match
0:1	Peña Sport - Amorebieta
2:1	Fraga - Laredo

4th Match
3:2	Amorebieta - Laredo
1:1	Fraga - Peña Sport

5th Match
0:0	Amorebieta - Peña Sport
0:0	Laredo - Fraga

6th Match
3:3	Peña Sport - Laredo
4:1	Fraga - Amorebieta

== Group B2 ==
Pos	Team	Pld	W	D	L	GF	GA	GD	Pts
1	Logroñés Promesas	6	3	2	1	11	6	+5	8
2	Tolosa CF	6	3	1	2	8	6	+2	7
3	CD Pontejos	6	2	1	3	5	11	−6	5
4	CD Calatayud	6	1	2	3	7	8	−1	4

Promoted to Segunda División B

=== Results ===
1st Match
1:3	Calatayud - Logroñés Pr.
2:0	Tolosa - Pontejos

2nd Match
0:2	Calatayud - Tolosa
4:0	Logroñés Pr. - Pontejos

3rd Match
0:2	Tolosa - Logroñés Pr.
0:0	Pontejos - Calatayud

4th Match
1:1	Logroñés Pr. - Calatayud
2:1	Pontejos - Tolosa

5th Match
1:1	Logoñés Pr. - Tolosa
4:0	Calatayud - Pontejos

6th Match
2:1	Tolosa - Calatayud
3:0	Pontejos - Logroñés Pr.

== Group B3 ==
Pos	Team	Pld	W	D	L	GF	GA	GD	Pts
1	CD Hernani	6	4	0	2	8	2	+6	8
2	UD Barbastro	6	3	1	2	9	7	+2	7
3	CD Alfaro	6	2	1	3	6	9	−3	5
4	CD Barquereño	6	2	0	4	4	9	−5	4

Promoted to Segunda División B

=== Results ===
1st Match
1:0	Alfaro - Hernani
3:0	Barbastro - Barquereño

2nd Match
1:1	Alfaro - Barbastro
2:0	Hernani - Barquereño

3rd Match
1:0	Barbastro - Hernani
3:1	Barquereño - Alfaro

4th Match
1:0	Hernani - Alfaro
1:0	Barquereño - Barbastro

5th Match
3:0	Hernani - Barbastro
1:0	Alfaro - Barquereño

6th Match
4:2	Barbastro - Alfaro
0:2	Barquereño - Hernani

== Group B4 ==
Pos	Team	Pld	W	D	L	GF	GA	GD	Pts
1	CD Tudelano	6	3	1	2	7	5	+2	7
2	UM Escobedo	6	2	2	2	5	8	−3	6
3	AD Sabiñánigo	6	2	2	2	9	7	+2	6
4	CD Elgoibar	6	2	1	3	5	6	−1	5

Promoted to Segunda División B

=== Results ===
1st Match
1:0	Escobedo - Elgoibar
2:0	Sabiñánigo - Tudelano

2nd Match
0:0	Escobedo - Sabiñánigo
2:0	Elgoibar - Tudelano

3rd Match
1:1	Sabiñánigo - Elgoibar
1:1	Tudelano - Escobedo

4th Match
0:2	Elgoibar - Escobedo
3:0	Tudelano - Sabiñánigo

5th Match
2:0	Elgoibar - Sabiñánigo
0:1	Escobedo - Tudelano

6th Match
6:1	Sabiñánigo - Escobedo
2:0	Tudelano - Elgoibar

== Group C1 ==
Pos	Team	Pld	W	D	L	GF	GA	GD	Pts
1	Gimnàstic de Tarragona	6	5	1	0	13	2	+11	11
2	CD Playas de Calviá	6	2	3	1	7	5	+2	7
3	CD Denia	6	1	2	3	5	9	−4	4
4	AD Mar Menor	6	1	0	5	4	13	−9	2

Promoted to Segunda División B

=== Results ===
1st Match
0:3	Mar Menor - Nàstic
0:0	P. Calvià - Denia

2nd Match
0:2	Mar Menor - P. Calvià
2:1	Nàstic - Denia

3rd Match
0:0	P. Calvià - Nàstic
1:0	Denia - Mar Menor

4th Match
2:0	Nàstic - Mar Menor
1:1	Denia - P. Calvià

5th Match
3:0	Nàstic - P. Calvià
3:1	Mar Menor - Denia

6th Match
4:1	P. Calvià - Mar Menor
1:3	Denia - Nàstic

== Group C2 ==
Pos	Team	Pld	W	D	L	GF	GA	GD	Pts
1	UD Oliva	6	4	1	1	6	2	+4	9
2	Águilas CF	6	4	0	2	10	4	+6	8
3	SD Ibiza	6	2	1	3	3	5	−2	5
4	CD Banyoles	6	0	2	4	3	11	−8	2

Promoted to Segunda División B

=== Results ===
1st Match
0:2	Águilas - Oliva
1:1	Banyoles - Ibiza

2nd Match
4:1	Águilas - Banyoles
1:0	Oliva - Ibiza

3rd Match
0:1	Banyoles - Oliva
0:2	Ibiza - Águilas

4th Match
0:1	Oliva - Águilas
1:0	Ibiza - Banyoles

5th Match
1:1	Oliva - Banyoles
0:1	Águilas - Ibiza

6th Match
0:3	Banyoles - Águilas
0:1	Ibiza - Oliva

== Group C3 ==
Pos	Team	Pld	W	D	L	GF	GA	GD	Pts
1	Villarreal CF	6	5	0	1	17	5	+12	10
2	CF Balaguer	6	3	0	3	8	8	0	6
3	Imperial CF	6	2	1	3	7	9	−2	5
4	CD Cala D'Or	6	1	1	4	6	16	−10	3

Promoted to Segunda División B

=== Results ===
1st Match
0:1	Imperial - Villarreal
0:1	Balaguer - Cala D'or

2nd Match
3:1	Imperial - Balaguer
8:1	Villarreal - Cala D'or

3rd Match
2:1	Balaguer - Villarreal
1:1	Cala D'or - Imperial

4th Match
1:0	Villarreal - Imperial
0:1	Cala D'or - Balaguer

5th Match
3:0	Villarreal - Balaguer
3:1	Imperial - Cala D'or

6th Match
4:0	Balaguer - Imperial
2:3	Cala D'or - Villarreal

== Group C4 ==
Pos	Team	Pld	W	D	L	GF	GA	GD	Pts
1	CD Roldán	6	5	1	0	9	4	+5	11
2	CA Roda de Barà	6	1	3	2	4	5	−1	5
3	SD Sueca	6	0	4	2	3	5	−2	4
4	CD Atlético Baleares	6	1	2	3	5	7	−2	4

Promoted to Segunda División B

=== Results ===
1st Match
0:1	Baleares - Roda de Barà
0:0	Roldán - Sueca

2nd Match
1:2	Baleares - Roldán
0:0	Roda de Barà - Sueca

3rd Match
1:0	Roldán - Roda de Barà
0:1	Sueca - Baleares

4th Match
1:1	Roda de Barà - Baleares
1:2	Sueca - Roldán

5th Match
1:2	Roda de Barà - Roldán
1:1	Baleares - Sueca

6th Match
2:1	Roldán - Baleares
1:1	Sueca - Roda de Barà

== Group D1 ==
Pos	Team	Pld	W	D	L	GF	GA	GD	Pts
1	CA Marbella	6	4	1	1	5	2	+3	9
2	UP Plasencia	6	3	2	1	8	5	+3	8
3	CD Guadalajara	6	2	0	4	4	7	−3	4
4	CD San Roque de Lepe	6	1	1	4	2	5	−3	3

Promoted to Segunda División B

=== Results ===
1st Match
2:1	At. Marbella - Plasencia
1:0	San Roque - Guadalajara

2nd Match
1:0	At. Marbella - San Roque
2:1	Plasencia - Guadalajara

3rd Match
1:0	Guadalajara - At. Marbella
0:0	San Roque - Plasencia

4th Match
1:0	Guadalajara - San Roque
0:0	Plasencia - At. Marbella

5th Match
1:0	At. Marbella - Guadalajara
2:1	Plasencia - San Roque

6th Match
0:1	San Roque - At. Marbella
1:3	Guadalajara - Plasencia

== Group D2 ==
Pos	Team	Pld	W	D	L	GF	GA	GD	Pts
1	Polideportivo Ejido	6	3	3	0	4	1	+3	9
2	CD Villanovense	6	4	1	1	5	1	+4	9
3	Cádiz CF B	6	1	1	4	5	10	−5	3
4	UB Conquense	6	1	1	4	7	9	−2	3

Promoted to Segunda División B

=== Results ===
1st Match
0:0	Villanovense - Ejido
3:1	Cádiz B - Conquense

2nd Match
1:0	Villanovense - Cádiz B
1:0	Ejido - Conquense

3rd Match
0:1	Conquense - Villanovense
0:0	Cádiz B - Ejido

4th Match
5:2	Conquense - Cádiz B
1:0	Ejido - Villanovense

5th Match
1:0	Ejido - Cádiz B
1:0	Villanovense - Conquense

6th Match
1:1	Conquense - Ejido
0:2	Cádiz B - Villanovense

== Group D3 ==
Pos	Team	Pld	W	D	L	GF	GA	GD	Pts
1	Racing Portuense	6	3	3	0	8	5	+3	9
2	CD Don Benito	6	2	3	1	11	7	+4	7
3	UD Socuéllamos	6	1	2	3	6	10	−4	4
4	Mármol Macael CD	6	2	0	4	6	9	−3	4

Promoted to Segunda División B

=== Results ===
1st Match
1-1	Portuense - Don Benito
2-1	M. Macael - Socuéllamos

2nd Match
1-0	Portuense - M. Macael
3-0	Don Benito - Socuéllamos

3rd Match
3-2	M. Macael - Don Benito
1-1	Socuéllamos - Portuense

4th Match
2-2	Don Benito - Portuense
2:1	Socuéllamos - M. Macael

5th Match
2:0	Don Benito - M. Macael
2:1	Portuense - Socuéllamos

6th Match
0:1	M. Macael - Portuense
1:1	Socuéllamos - Don Benito

== Group D4 ==
Pos	Team	Pld	W	D	L	GF	GA	GD	Pts
1	Real Jaén	6	5	1	0	7	1	+6	11
2	Écija Balompié	6	1	3	2	5	4	+1	5
3	Talavera CF	6	2	1	3	4	5	−1	5
4	CP Cacereño	6	1	1	4	3	9	−6	3

Promoted to Segunda División B

=== Results ===
1st Match
1-0	R. Jaén - Talavera
1-1	Cacereño - Écija

2nd Match
1-0	R. Jaén - Cacereño
1-0	Talavera - Écija

3rd Match
1-0	Cacereño - Talavera
0-0	Écija - R. Jaén

4th Match
0-2	Talavera - R. Jaén
3-0	Écija - Cacereño

5th Match
2-0	Talavera - Cacereño
1-0	R. Jaén - Écija

6th Match
1-2	Cacereño - R. Jaén
1-1	Écija - Talavera

== Group E ==
Pos	Team	Pld	W	D	L	GF	GA	GD	Pts
1	CD Maspalomas	6	3	2	1	16	11	+5	8
2	UD Realejos	6	2	3	1	5	4	+1	7
3	CD Mensajero	6	1	4	1	8	6	+2	6
4	CD Corralejo	6	0	3	3	4	12	−8	3

Promoted to Segunda División B

=== Results ===
1st Match
0-0	Corralejo - Realejos
1-1	Mensajero - Maspalomas

2nd Match
0-0	Corralejo - Mensajero
3-1	Realejos - Maspalomas

3rd Match
0-1	Mensajero - Realejos
5-2	Maspalomas - Corralejo

4th Match
0-0	Realejos - Corralejo
3-3	Maspalomas - Mensajero

5th Match
0-0	Realejos - Mensajero
1-3	Corralejo - Maspalomas

6th Match
4-1	Mensajero - Corralejo
3-1	Maspalomas - Realejos
