= 1992 Segunda División B play-offs =

Spanish football league play-offs

The 1992 Segunda División B play-offs were the final playoffs for the promotion from 1991–92 Segunda División B to 1992–93 Segunda División. The first four teams in each group took part in the play-off. The teams played a league of four teams, divided into 4 groups. The champion of each group promoted to Segunda División.

== Group A ==
Pos	Team	Pld	W	D	L	GF	GA	GD	Pts	Qualification or relegation
1	Badajoz	6	4	1	1	12	5	+7	9	Promotion to Segunda División
2	Cartagena	6	3	1	2	8	9	−1	7	
3	Alavés	6	3	0	3	9	8	+1	6	
4	Sporting Gijón B	6	0	2	4	3	10	−7	2	

Source: BDFútbol
Rules for classification: 1) points; 2) head-to-head points; 3) head-to-head goal difference; 4) goal difference; 5) number of goals scored

=== Results ===
Home \ Away	ALA	BAD	CAR	SPO
Alavés	—	1–2	4–1	1–0
Badajoz	1–0	—	5–1	3–0
Cartagena	2–0	2–0	—	0–0
Sporting Gijón B	2–3	1–1	0–2	—

Source: BDFútbol
Legend: Blue = home team win; Yellow = draw; Red = away team win.

== Group B ==
Pos	Team	Pld	W	D	L	GF	GA	GD	Pts	Qualification or relegation
1	Villarreal	6	4	0	2	9	9	0	8	Promotion to Segunda División
2	Girona	6	3	0	3	11	9	+2	6 (Note: Girona finished ahead of Salamanca on number of goals scored)	
3	Salamanca	6	3	0	3	7	5	+2	6	
4	Linense	6	2	0	4	5	9	−4	4	

Source: BDFútbol
Rules for classification: 1) points; 2) head-to-head points; 3) head-to-head goal difference; 4) goal difference; 5) number of goals scored

=== Results ===
Home \ Away	GIR	LNS	SAL	VIL
Girona	—	4–1	1–0	1–2
Linense	2–0	—	1–0	1–2
Salamanca	2–1	2–0	—	2–0
Villarreal	2–4	1–0	2–1	—

Source: BDFútbol
Legend: Blue = home team win; Yellow = draw; Red = away team win.

== Group C ==
Pos	Team	Pld	W	D	L	GF	GA	GD	Pts	Qualification or relegation
1	Lugo	6	3	2	1	8	6	+2	8	Promotion to Segunda División
2	Extremadura	6	2	3	1	11	7	+4	7 (Note: Extremadura finished ahead of Sant Andreu on overall goal difference)	
3	Sant Andreu	6	2	3	1	9	7	+2	7	
4	Elche	6	0	2	4	3	11	−8	2	

Source: BDFútbol
Rules for classification: 1) points; 2) head-to-head points; 3) head-to-head goal difference; 4) goal difference; 5) number of goals scored

=== Results ===
Home \ Away	ELC	EXT	LUG	STA
Elche	—	0–0	1–1	1–2
Extremadura	5–1	—	3–1	2–2
Lugo	1–0	2–0	—	2–1
Sant Andreu	2–0	1–1	1–1	—

Source: BDFútbol
Legend: Blue = home team win; Yellow = draw; Red = away team win.

== Group D ==
Pos	Team	Pld	W	D	L	GF	GA	GD	Pts	Qualification or relegation
1	Marbella	6	4	1	1	7	1	+6	9	Promotion to Segunda División
2	Yeclano	6	2	3	1	4	2	+2	7	
3	Manlleu	6	2	2	2	3	5	−2	6	
4	As Pontes	6	0	2	4	2	8	−6	2	

Source: BDFútbol
Rules for classification: 1) points; 2) head-to-head points; 3) head-to-head goal difference; 4) goal difference; 5) number of goals scored

=== Results ===
Home \ Away	ASP	MAN	MAB	YEC
As Pontes	—	0–0	0–1	1–1
Manlleu	2–1	—	1–0	0–1
Marbella	2–0	3–0	—	1–0
Yeclano	2–0	0–0	0–0	—

Source: BDFútbol
Legend: Blue = home team win; Yellow = draw; Red = away team win.
