= Manolo Sánchez =

Manolo Sanchez may refer to:

- Manolo Sanchez (valet) (born 1930), long-time valet to Richard Nixon
- Manolo Sánchez (footballer, born 1969), Spanish footballer
- Manolo Sánchez (footballer, born 1976), Spanish footballer
- Manolo Sánchez (footballer, born 1991), Puerto Rican footballer
