= Pumarín CF =

Spanish football club

Pumarín
- Full name: Pumarín Club de Fútbol
- Founded: 4 December 1918; 107 years ago
- Stadium: Campo de Fútbol Luis Oliver
- Capacity: 500
- President: Felipe Fernández Cabeza
- Head coach: Rober Somoano
- League: Primera Asturfútbol
- 2025–26: Segunda Asturfútbol – Group 2, 5th of 18 (promoted via play-offs)
Home colours	Away colours

Pumarín Club de Fútbol is a football team based in Oviedo in the autonomous community of Asturias. Founded in 1918, the team plays in Primera Asturfútbol. The club played their home games at Campo de Fútbol Luis Oliver, which has a capacity of 500 spectators.

== History ==
The biggest success of the club was in the 1990–91 season, when they qualified in the fourth position of the Group II of Tercera División and played the promotion playoffs to Segunda División B.

After that success, Pumarín qualified for the 1991–92 Copa del Rey, where it was defeated in the first round by CD Mosconia.

== Season to season ==
Season	Level	Division	Place	Copa del Rey
1929–1956	—	Regional	—	
1957–58	5	2ª Reg.	3rd	
1958–59	5	2ª Reg.		
1959–60	5	2ª Reg.	13th	
1960–61	5	2ª Reg.	13th	
1961–62	5	2ª Reg.	14th	
1962–63	5	2ª Reg.	8th	
1963–64	5	2ª Reg.	7th	
1964–65	5	2ª Reg.	8th	
1965–66	5	2ª Reg.	10th	
1966–67	5	2ª Reg.	12th	
1967–1981	DNP			
1981–82	7	2ª Reg.	2nd	
1982–83	7	2ª Reg.	1st	
1983–84	6	1ª Reg.	2nd	
1984–85	5	Reg. Pref.	12th	
1985–86	5	Reg. Pref.	5th	
1986–87	4	3ª	10th	
1987–88	4	3ª	13th	
1988–89	4	3ª	13th	

Season	Level	Division	Place	Copa del Rey
1989–90	4	3ª	9th	
1990–91	4	3ª	4th	
1991–92	4	3ª	14th	First round
1992–93	4	3ª	17th	
1993–94	4	3ª	16th	
1994–95	4	3ª	8th	
1995–96	4	3ª	16th	
1996–97	4	3ª	7th	
1997–98	4	3ª	5th	
1998–99	4	3ª	19th	
1999–2000	5	Reg. Pref.	3rd	
2000–01	4	3ª	13th	
2001–02	4	3ª	5th	
2002–03	4	3ª	15th	
2003–04	4	3ª	17th	
2004–05	5	Reg. Pref.	9th	
2005–06	5	Reg. Pref.	9th	
2006–07	5	Reg. Pref.	15th	
2007–08	5	Reg. Pref.	20th	
2008–09	6	1ª Reg.	6th	

Season	Level	Division	Place	Copa del Rey
2009–10	6	1ª Reg.	3rd	
2010–11	5	Reg. Pref.	3rd	
2011–12	4	3ª	19th	
2012–13	5	Reg. Pref.	6th	
2013–14	5	Reg. Pref.	19th	
2014–15	6	1ª Reg.	2nd	
2015–16	6	1ª Reg.	3rd	
2016–17	6	1ª Reg.	2nd	
2017–18	6	1ª Reg.	2nd	
2018–19	6	1ª Reg.	5th	
2019–20	6	1ª Reg.	7th	
2020–21	6	1ª Reg.	4th	
2021–22	7	1ª Reg.	4th	
2022–23	7	2ª RFFPA	9th	
2023–24	7	2ª Astur.	11th	
2024–25	7	2ª Astur.	6th	
2025–26	7	2ª Astur.		

- 19 seasons in Tercera División
