= Carlo Adriano =

Spanish footballer

Personal information
- Full name: Carlo Adriano García Prades
- Date of birth: 12 February 2001 (age 25)
- Place of birth: Villarreal, Spain
- Height: 1.85 m (6 ft 1 in)
- Position: Midfielder

Team information
- Current team: Querétaro
- Number: 4

Youth career
- Benicasim
- 2010–2019: Villarreal

Senior career*
Years	Team	Apps	(Gls)
2019–2020	Villarreal C	26	(6)
2020–2024	Villarreal B	126	(7)
2020–2025	Villarreal	1	(0)
2025	→ Mirandés (loan)	9	(0)
2025–	Querétaro	30	(1)

International career
2020	Spain U19	1	(0)
- * Club domestic league appearances and goals as of 29 August 2026

Carlo Adriano García Prades (born 12 February 2001), known as Carlo Adriano, is a Spanish professional footballer who plays as a central midfielder for Liga MX club Querétaro.

== Club career ==
=== Villarreal ===
Born in Villarreal, Castellón, Valencian Community, Carlo Adriano joined Villarreal CF's youth setup in 2010, from CD Benicasim. He made his senior debut with the C-team on 24 August 2019, starting in a 3–0 Tercera División away win against CF Recambios Colón.

Carlo Adriano scored his first senior goal on 1 September 2019, netting the game's only in a home success over CD Olímpic de Xàtiva. On 26 October, he scored a brace in a 5–0 home routing of UD Benigànim.

Ahead of the 2020–21 season, Carlo Adriano was assigned to the reserves in Segunda División B, and made his debut for the side on 18 October 2020 by starting in a 0–1 loss at SCR Peña Deportiva. He made his first team debut on 16 December, coming on as a late substitute for Juan Foyth in a 6–0 away routing of SD Leioa, for the season's Copa del Rey; by doing so, he became the sixth player born in Villarreal to debut for the club.

Carlo Adriano made his professional – and La Liga – debut on 3 January 2022, replacing fellow youth graduate Manu Trigueros in a 5–0 home routing of Levante UD. He scored his first professional goal on 12 October, netting the B's first in a 2–2 Segunda División home draw against SD Ponferradina.

A regular starter for the B's, Carlo Adriano suffered a knee injury in May 2024, being sidelined for seven months. Upon returning, he was loaned to CD Mirandés in the second division on 22 January 2025.

=== Querétaro ===
On 10 August 2025, Carlo Adriano left the Yellow Submarine after 15 years and moved abroad for the first time in his career, joining Liga MX side Querétaro.

== Personal life ==
Carlo Adriano's father and brother were also footballers: the former, Adriano was also a forward, while the latter, Cristian, was a midfielder. Both were also groomed at Villarreal.
