= 1991–92 Segunda División B =

Segunda División B
- Season: 1991–92
- Champions: Cartagena; Marbella; Salamanca; Sant Andreu
- Promoted: Badajoz; Lugo; Marbella; Villarreal
- Relegated: Alzira; Atlético Sanluqueño; Binéfar; Cambados; Fabril; Fraga; Fuengirola; Gandía; Huesca; Lalín; Los Boliches; Mollerussa; Mosconia; Oliva; Roldán; Torrent
- Matches: 1,520
- Goals: 3,430 (2.26 per match)
- Top goalscorer: Adriano García (24 goals)
- Best goalkeeper: Luis Raudona (0.38 goals/match)
- Biggest home win: Xerez 8–0 Marino (9 February 1992); Manlleu 8–0 Baskonia (17 May 1992)
- Biggest away win: Fuengirola 0–5 Maspalomas (3 November 1991); Mosconia 0–5 Logroñés B (8 December 1991); Logroñés B 0–5 Salamanca (11 April 1992)
- Highest scoring: Maspalomas 8–1 Villanovense (23 February 1992); Mollerussa 3–6 FC Andorra (8 March 1992); Extremadura 7–2 Poli Ejido (29 March 1992); Maspalomas 8–1 Los Boliches (24 May 1992)
- Longest winning run: 6 matches Real Sociedad B Hércules; Marbella
- Longest unbeaten run: 23 matches Linense
- Longest winless run: 17 matches Torrent
- Longest losing run: 9 matches Huesca

The 1991–92 Segunda División B season was the 15th since its establishment. The first matches of the season were played on 31 August 1991, and the season ended on 28 June 1992 with the promotion play-off final games.

== Overview before the season ==
80 teams joined the league, including five relegated from the 1990–91 Segunda División and 18 promoted from the 1990–91 Tercera División. The composition of the groups was determined by the Royal Spanish Football Federation, attending to geographical criteria.

Relegated from Segunda División

- Orihuela
- Elche
- Salamanca
- Levante
- Xerez

Promoted from Tercera División

- Fabril
- Lalín
- Mosconia
- Valladolid B
- Fraga
- Logroñés B
- Hernani
- Tudelano
- Gimnàstic
- Oliva
- Villarreal
- Roldán
- Marbella
- Polideportivo Ejido
- Villanovense
- Portuense
- Jaén
- Maspalomas

== Group 1 ==
Teams from Asturias, Cantabria, Castile and Leon, Galicia, La Rioja and Navarre.

=== Teams ===
Location of teams in Segunda División B Gr. 1 1991–92

Team	Founded	Home city	Stadium
As Pontes	1960	As Pontes, Galicia	O Poboado
Real Ávila	1923	Ávila, Castile and Leon	Adolfo Suárez
Cambados	1963	Cambados, Galicia	Burgáns
Cultural Leonesa	1923	León, Castile and Leon	Antonio Amilvia
Fabril	1914	A Coruña, Galicia	Anexo de Riazor
Gimnástica de Torrelavega	1907	Torrelavega, Cantabria	El Malecón
Lalín	1974	Lalín, Galicia	Manuel Anxo Cortizo
Logroñés B	1950	Logroño, La Rioja	Las Gaunas
Lugo	1953	Lugo, Galicia	Anxo Carro
Mosconia	1961	Grado, Asturias	Marqués de La Vega de Anzo
Numancia	1945	Soria, Castile and León	Los Pajaritos
Orense	1952	Ourense, Galicia	O Couto
Real Oviedo B	1930	Oviedo, Asturias	Carlos Tartiere
Palencia	1975	Palencia, Castile and León	La Balastera
Ponferradina	1922	Ponferrada, Castile and Leon	Fuentesnuevas
Pontevedra	1941	Pontevedra, Galicia	Pasarón
Salamanca	1923	Salamanca, Castile and Leon	Helmántico
Sporting Gijón B	1960	Gijón, Asturias	Mareo
Tudelano	1935	Tudela, Navarre	José Antonio Elola
Valladolid B	1942	Valladolid, Castile and León	Anexo José Zorrilla

=== League table ===
Pos	Team	Pld	W	D	L	GF	GA	GD	Pts	Qualification or relegation
1	Salamanca	38	20	13	5	65	22	+43	53	Qualification for the promotion playoffs
2	Lugo (P)	38	16	16	6	40	24	+16	48	Qualification for the promotion playoffs
3	Sporting Gijón B	38	17	13	8	38	22	+16	47	Qualification for the promotion playoffs
4	As Pontes	38	14	17	7	42	30	+12	45	Qualification for the promotion playoffs
5	Ourense	38	16	12	10	42	27	+15	44 (Note: Ourense finished ahead of Cultural Leonesa on head-to-head points: Ourense–Cultural Leonesa 2–1, Cultural Leonesa–Ourense 0–2)	
6	Cultural Leonesa	38	14	16	8	38	26	+12	44	
7	Gimnástica Torrelavega	38	14	14	10	31	28	+3	42	
8	Valladolid B	38	16	8	14	44	38	+6	40	
9	Pontevedra	38	14	11	13	40	41	−1	39	
10	Numancia	38	8	21	9	39	34	+5	37 (Note: Numancia finished ahead of Oviedo B on head-to-head goal difference: Oviedo B–Numancia 1–0, Numancia–Oviedo B 2–0)	
11	Oviedo B	38	13	11	14	37	40	−3	37	
12	Palencia	38	10	15	13	39	45	−6	35 (Note: Palencia finished ahead of Ávila on head-to-head points: Ávila–Palencia 1–1, Palencia–Ávila 3–1)	
13	Ávila	38	11	13	14	30	36	−6	35	
14	Ponferradina	38	11	12	15	45	58	−13	34 (Note: Ponferradina finished ahead of Tudelano, Logroñés B and Lalín on head-to-head points: Ponferradina 9 pts, Tudelano 8 pts, Logroñés B 5 pts, Lalín 2 pts)	
15	Tudelano	38	10	14	14	36	43	−7	34	
16	Logroñés B	38	10	14	14	35	47	−12	34	
17	Lalín	38	11	12	15	38	44	−6	34	Relegation to Tercera División
18	Fabril	38	10	11	17	45	56	−11	31	Relegation to Tercera División
19	Cambados	38	7	12	19	23	47	−24	26	Relegation to Tercera División
20	Mosconia	38	7	7	24	29	68	−39	21	Relegation to Tercera División

Source: BDFútbol
Rules for classification: 1) points; 2) head-to-head points; 3) head-to-head goal difference; 4) goal difference; 5) number of goals scored
(P) Promoted

=== Results ===
Home \ Away	ASP	AVA	CAM	CUL	FAB	GIM	LAL	LOG	LUG	MOS	NUM	ORE	OVI	PAL	PNF	PNT	SAL	SPG	TUD	VLD
As Pontes	—	0–0	2–0	2–2	2–0	3–1	0–1	2–1	0–0	0–1	2–0	0–0	2–0	2–2	1–1	4–2	0–0	1–2	1–0	4–1
Real Ávila	0–0	—	1–0	0–0	1–1	2–1	1–3	2–0	2–0	1–1	1–1	0–1	2–0	1–1	4–1	1–1	0–1	1–3	3–1	1–1
Cambados	0–0	0–0	—	0–1	0–1	1–0	2–1	0–0	2–1	2–1	2–2	0–1	1–1	2–0	2–4	0–0	1–2	0–0	1–1	0–1
Cultural Leonesa	1–1	1–0	3–0	—	1–0	2–0	0–0	4–0	1–0	3–1	1–1	0–2	0–0	1–0	0–0	2–1	0–0	1–1	2–0	3–2
Fabril	0–1	0–1	3–0	0–2	—	0–2	3–1	3–1	1–2	2–0	1–1	1–1	1–1	3–3	5–1	1–1	0–0	0–2	4–1	0–0
Gimnástica	1–0	2–0	1–1	1–0	0–0	—	1–0	0–1	0–0	2–0	0–0	1–0	0–0	4–1	1–0	2–0	0–0	1–0	2–0	1–0
Lalín	1–4	0–0	1–0	1–0	2–2	2–1	—	0–1	3–3	2–0	2–0	1–3	1–0	2–2	0–1	3–0	0–1	1–2	0–0	0–1
Logroñés B	1–1	2–0	0–0	0–0	4–3	0–0	1–1	—	1–1	3–2	0–0	0–0	0–2	0–2	0–0	0–1	0–5	2–1	0–0	1–3
Lugo	1–1	1–0	3–0	0–0	5–1	1–1	1–1	0–2	—	1–0	0–0	2–1	0–0	2–0	1–0	1–2	1–0	2–0	1–0	1–0
Mosconia	0–1	0–1	0–1	0–3	4–1	1–1	2–1	0–5	0–1	—	0–0	2–1	0–1	1–0	1–4	2–0	1–2	2–1	1–1	1–1
Numancia	3–0	0–0	1–1	1–1	0–0	0–1	3–1	0–0	0–2	4–0	—	1–1	2–0	3–1	2–2	4–1	0–0	0–0	0–2	2–1
Orense	0–1	3–0	2–1	2–1	2–0	2–0	1–1	1–0	0–0	6–1	2–1	—	2–0	0–0	1–1	1–1	0–0	1–0	2–0	3–1
Real Oviedo B	3–2	2–0	2–1	5–1	0–1	1–1	1–1	1–1	1–0	3–1	1–0	2–0	—	1–1	2–3	1–1	1–0	0–1	3–0	2–0
Palencia	0–0	3–1	0–0	0–0	3–1	4–0	1–1	1–3	1–2	1–1	0–3	1–0	2–0	—	3–1	0–0	0–2	0–0	0–0	1–0
Ponferradina	0–0	0–1	1–2	1–0	2–0	2–2	1–0	4–3	1–1	2–1	2–2	1–0	0–0	3–1	—	1–2	0–3	0–1	1–1	1–2
Pontevedra	0–1	1–0	2–0	2–0	3–1	0–0	1–1	0–0	0–1	1–0	1–0	0–0	3–0	0–1	1–0	—	0–0	1–2	4–1	1–2
Salamanca	4–0	1–0	2–0	1–1	2–3	3–0	0–1	3–0	1–1	5–0	3–0	2–0	5–0	1–1	5–2	4–2	—	1–0	1–1	2–1
Sporting Gijón B	0–0	0–0	3–0	0–0	1–0	1–0	2–0	2–0	1–1	1–1	0–0	0–0	1–0	1–0	1–0	3–0	1–1	—	3–2	0–1
Tudelano	1–1	0–2	1–0	1–0	0–1	0–0	2–0	2–1	0–0	1–0	1–1	3–0	2–0	3–1	1–1	1–2	1–1	0–0	—	4–0
Valladolid B	0–0	3–0	2–0	0–0	3–1	0–0	0–1	0–1	0–0	2–0	1–1	1–0	1–0	0–1	5–0	0–2	3–1	2–1	3–1	—

Source: BDFútbol
Legend: Blue = home team win; Yellow = draw; Red = away team win.

=== Top goalscorers ===
Goalscorers	Goals	Team
(Spain) Quecho	19	Ourense
(Spain) Pinki	14	Numancia
(Spain) Luisito	14	Ávila
(Spain) Jesús Hevia	14	Ponferradina
(Spain) Arturo Patiño	14	Fabril

=== Top goalkeepers ===
Goalkeeper	Goals	Matches	Average	Team
(Spain) Manuel Cervantes	21	37	0.57	Salamanca
(Spain) José Luis Manzanedo	25	38	0.66	Cultural Leonesa
(Spain) Manuel Ares	25	36	0.69	Ourense
(Spain) Agapito Moncaleán	28	38	0.74	Gimnástica Torrelavega
(Spain) Miguel Ángel Arrastia	35	35	1	Tudelano

== Group 2 ==
Teams from Andorra, Aragon, Balearic Islands, Basque Country, Catalonia and Navarre.

=== Teams ===
Location of teams in Segunda División B Gr. 2 1991–92

Team	Founded	Home city	Stadium
Alavés	1921	Vitoria-Gasteiz, Basque Country	Mendizorroza
FC Andorra	1942	Andorra la Vella, Andorra	Comunal
Barakaldo	1917	Barakaldo, Basque Country	Lasesarre
Basconia	1913	Basauri, Basque Country	Basozelai
Binéfar	1922	Binéfar, Aragon	El Segalar
Fraga	1947	Fraga, Aragon	La Estacada
Gimnàstic de Tarragona	1886	Tarragona, Catalonia	Nou Estadi Tarragona
Girona	1930	Girona, Catalonia	Montilivi
Hernani	1940	Hernani, Basque Country	Zubipe
Hospitalet	1957	L'Hospitalet de Llobregat, Catalonia	Municipal de Deportes
Huesca	1960	Huesca, Aragon	El Alcoraz
Lemona	1923	Lemoa, Basque Country	Arlonagusia
Sporting Mahonés	1974	Mahón, Balearic Islands	Bintaufa
Manlleu	1933	Manlleu, Catalonia	Municipal Manlleu
Mollerussa	1930	Mollerussa, Catalonia	Municipal Mollerussa
Osasuna B	1962	Aranguren, Navarre	Tajonar
Real Sociedad B	1951	San Sebastián, Basque Country	Atotxa
Sant Andreu	1909	Barcelona, Catalonia	Narcís Sala
Santurtzi	1952	Santurtzi, Basque Country	San Jorge
Zaragoza B	1958	Zaragoza, Aragon	Ciudad Deportiva del Real Zaragoza

=== League table ===
Pos	Team	Pld	W	D	L	GF	GA	GD	Pts	Qualification or relegation
1	Sant Andreu	38	23	8	7	70	35	+35	54	Qualification for the promotion playoffs
2	Manlleu	38	20	9	9	61	32	+29	49	Qualification for the promotion playoffs
3	Girona	38	19	10	9	66	44	+22	48 (Note: Girona finished ahead of Alavés on head-to-head goal difference: Girona–Alavés 4–1, Alavés–Girona 3–1)	Qualification for the promotion playoffs
4	Alavés	38	19	10	9	51	31	+20	48	Qualification for the promotion playoffs
5	L'Hospitalet	38	21	4	13	65	44	+21	46	
6	FC Andorra	38	14	16	8	64	46	+18	44 (Note: FC Andorra finished ahead of Barakaldo on head-to-head points: Barakaldo–FC Andorra 0–0, FC Andorra–Barakaldo 1–0)	
7	Barakaldo	38	14	16	8	49	33	+16	44	
8	Real Sociedad B	38	18	6	14	49	38	+11	42	
9	Gimnàstic	38	13	14	11	45	41	+4	40	
10	Osasuna B	38	13	11	14	54	45	+9	37	
11	Zaragoza B	38	11	13	14	47	47	0	35 (Note: Zaragoza B finished ahead of Sporting Mahonés, Baskonia, Hernani and Lemona on head-to-head points: Zaragoza B 10 pts, Sporting Mahonés 10 pts, Baskonia 8 pts, Hernani 6 pts, Lemona 6 pts. Zaragoza B finished ahead of Sporting Mahonés on head-to-head points: Zaragoza B–Sporting Mahonés 1–1, Sporting Mahonés–Zaragoza B 1–2. Hernani finished ahead of Lemona on overall goal difference)	
12	Sporting Mahonés	38	12	11	15	35	45	−10	35	
13	Baskonia	38	11	13	14	36	52	−16	35	
14	Hernani	38	11	13	14	49	53	−4	35	
15	Lemona	38	12	11	15	33	50	−17	35	
16	Santurtzi	38	13	7	18	29	45	−16	33	
17	Fraga	38	8	11	19	29	68	−39	27	Relegation to Tercera División
18	Huesca	38	7	11	20	41	68	−27	25	Relegation to Tercera División
19	Mollerussa	38	7	10	21	46	78	−32	24 (Note: Mollerussa finished ahead of Binéfar on head-to-head points: Mollerussa–Binéfar 3–0, Binéfar–Mollerussa 1–2)	Relegation to Tercera División
20	Binéfar	38	7	10	21	30	54	−24	24	Relegation to Tercera División

Source: BDFútbol
Rules for classification: 1) points; 2) head-to-head points; 3) head-to-head goal difference; 4) goal difference; 5) number of goals scored

=== Results ===
Home \ Away	ALV	AND	BAR	BAS	BIN	FRA	GIM	GIR	HER	HOS	HUE	LEM	MAH	MAN	MOL	OSA	RSO	SAD	SAN	ZAR
Alavés	—	1–0	1–1	1–1	1–0	4–0	1–0	3–1	1–3	2–1	0–0	1–1	3–0	2–0	3–0	2–1	2–0	2–3	0–0	1–0
FC Andorra	2–2	—	1–0	1–0	0–0	1–0	0–0	2–2	2–0	1–2	3–2	0–1	0–1	2–1	4–1	2–2	3–1	3–3	2–1	1–1
Barakaldo	1–1	0–0	—	1–1	3–1	1–0	0–0	2–1	3–0	3–0	4–0	0–0	3–0	4–1	5–1	1–1	1–0	2–1	4–0	0–0
Basconia	1–0	3–2	1–2	—	1–1	1–1	0–0	0–2	1–0	2–1	2–2	0–0	1–1	1–1	1–0	2–1	2–0	0–1	1–1	0–1
Binéfar	0–2	1–1	0–0	0–0	—	3–1	2–0	0–2	1–1	0–2	0–1	0–0	2–0	0–1	1–2	3–1	4–0	1–4	0–1	1–0
Fraga	1–0	1–1	1–1	0–2	0–0	—	2–1	1–1	3–2	0–4	0–1	1–0	0–0	0–1	0–0	2–1	0–4	1–0	2–0	2–5
Gimnàstic	1–0	2–2	3–1	1–0	1–1	1–1	—	3–3	2–2	3–1	1–0	0–0	0–1	1–2	1–1	2–1	1–0	2–0	3–0	2–1
Girona	4–1	1–1	2–0	2–1	1–0	3–1	1–1	—	1–0	2–1	3–0	4–0	6–2	0–0	1–1	2–4	3–1	0–3	2–1	4–2
Hernani	1–1	1–1	0–0	1–1	2–0	1–2	3–0	2–1	—	3–2	5–2	2–1	1–1	2–1	3–1	1–0	0–1	3–3	1–2	1–1
Hospitalet	0–1	3–2	5–2	4–3	2–1	1–1	1–0	1–2	4–0	—	1–2	3–0	2–0	0–2	3–2	2–1	1–0	1–1	2–0	1–0
Huesca	0–1	3–3	0–0	2–0	2–2	1–1	1–4	0–1	1–1	1–4	—	1–0	0–1	0–0	3–1	1–4	1–2	1–1	1–2	1–1
Lemona	0–0	1–4	1–0	2–3	2–1	4–0	0–0	1–2	2–1	1–0	2–1	—	1–1	1–0	1–0	2–2	1–2	2–2	0–0	1–3
Sporting Mahonés	0–1	0–0	1–2	2–1	2–1	5–0	1–4	1–1	2–1	0–1	3–2	1–0	—	0–0	0–0	1–0	0–0	0–1	1–0	1–2
Manlleu	2–1	2–1	3–0	8–0	2–3	1–0	2–0	0–0	1–0	1–1	4–1	2–0	2–1	—	3–1	1–1	0–1	1–2	4–0	2–0
Mollerussa	1–3	3–6	2–2	4–0	3–0	2–2	0–2	2–1	0–3	0–1	4–2	1–2	1–2	1–4	—	2–0	1–4	0–2	2–2	0–0
Osasuna B	1–1	1–1	0–0	2–0	4–0	4–0	4–0	1–2	3–0	2–1	2–2	0–1	1–0	0–0	1–1	—	2–0	2–1	2–0	1–0
Real Sociedad B	2–0	2–1	0–0	0–1	3–0	2–1	1–1	3–2	3–0	0–1	1–0	4–0	1–1	0–1	5–1	1–0	—	2–1	1–0	1–1
Sant Andreu	2–1	1–2	2–0	3–0	1–0	6–1	1–1	1–0	0–0	1–0	1–0	4–0	2–1	1–2	2–0	1–1	3–1	—	4–0	2–1
Santurtzi	0–2	0–3	0–0	0–1	2–0	2–0	1–0	1–0	0–0	0–3	2–0	3–0	1–0	1–0	1–2	4–0	0–0	0–1	—	1–0
Zaragoza B	0–2	0–3	2–0	1–1	3–0	1–0	3–1	0–0	2–2	2–2	1–3	1–2	1–1	3–3	2–2	3–0	1–0	1–2	1–0	—

Source: BDFútbol
Legend: Blue = home team win; Yellow = draw; Red = away team win.

=== Top goalscorers ===
Goalscorers	Goals	Team
(Spain) Chili	19	FC Andorra
(Spain) Juan Carlos Lasheras	18	Barakaldo
(Spain) Salvador Cardona	17	FC Andorra
(Spain) Manolo Baena	16	L'Hospitalet
(Spain) Joseba Irazusta	16	Real Sociedad B

=== Top goalkeepers ===
Goalkeeper	Goals	Matches	Average	Team
(Spain) Jaume Torras	29	37	0.78	Manlleu
(Spain) Peio Aguirreoa	31	38	0.82	Alavés
(Spain) Julio Escalante	28	33	0.85	Barakaldo
(Spain) Eduard Abadal	34	38	0.89	Sant Andreu
(Spain) Rafael Arumí	41	38	1.08	Gimnàstic

== Group 3 ==
Teams from Castilla–La Mancha, Madrid, Region of Murcia and Valencian Community

=== Teams ===
Location of teams in Segunda División B Gr. 3 1991–92

Team	Founded	Home city	Stadium
Alcoyano	1928	Alcoy, Valencian Community	El Collao
Alzira	1946	Alzira, Valencian Community	Luis Suñer Picó
Atlético Madrid B	1969	Madrid, Madrid	Vicente Calderón
Benidorm	1964	Benidorm, Valencian Community	Foietes
Cartagena FC	1940	Cartagena, Region of Murcia	Cartagonova
Elche	1923	Elche, Valencian Community	Martínez Valero
Gandía	1947	Gandia, Valencian Community	Guillermo Olagüe
Getafe	1983	Getafe, Madrid	Las Margaritas
Hércules	1922	Alicante, Valencian Community	José Rico Pérez
Leganés	1928	Leganés, Madrid	Luis Rodríguez de Miguel
Levante	1909	Valencia, Valencian Community	Nou Estadi Llevant
Oliva	1946	Oliva, Valencian Community	El Morer
Orihuela	1944	Orihuela, Valencian Community	Los Arcos
Roldán	N/A	Roldán, Region of Murcia	San José
Tomelloso	1979	Tomelloso, Castilla–La Mancha	Municipal
Torrent	1922	Torrent, Valencian Community	San Gregorio
Torrevieja	1971	Torrevieja, Valencian Community	Vicente García
Valdepeñas	1956	Valdepeñas, Castilla–La Mancha	La Molineta
Villarreal	1923	Villarreal, Valencian Community	El Madrigal
Yeclano	1950	Yecla, Region of Murcia	Municipal de Deportes

=== League table ===
Pos	Team	Pld	W	D	L	GF	GA	GD	Pts	Qualification or relegation
1	Cartagena	38	21	14	3	49	15	+34	56	Qualification for the promotion playoffs
2	Villarreal (P)	38	19	13	6	61	39	+22	51	Qualification for the promotion playoffs
3	Yeclano	38	19	12	7	59	30	+29	50	Qualification for the promotion playoffs
4	Elche	38	16	16	6	61	32	+29	48	Qualification for the promotion playoffs
5	Hércules	38	19	8	11	64	34	+30	46	
6	Getafe	38	17	11	10	42	32	+10	45	
7	Atlético Madrid B	38	18	7	13	43	34	+9	43	
8	Leganés	38	13	16	9	35	34	+1	42	
9	Alcoyano	38	13	14	11	47	32	+15	40	
10	Torrevieja	38	15	9	14	34	38	−4	39 (Note: Torrevieja finished ahead of Levante on head-to-head points: Levante–Torrevieja 1–1, Torrevieja–Levante 1–0)	
11	Levante	38	13	13	12	36	29	+7	39	
12	Tomelloso	38	12	14	12	46	35	+11	38 (Note: Tomelloso finished ahead of Benidorm on overall goal difference)	
13	Benidorm	38	13	12	13	38	38	0	38	
14	Orihuela	38	14	9	15	36	44	−8	37	
15	Valdepeñas	38	9	13	16	31	48	−17	31	
16	Gandía	38	9	12	17	42	55	−13	30	Relegation to Tercera División
17	Roldán	38	9	9	20	30	47	−17	27	Relegation to Tercera División
18	Oliva	38	9	8	21	37	59	−22	26	Relegation to Tercera División
19	Torrent	38	3	12	23	28	83	−55	18	Relegation to Tercera División
20	Alzira	38	6	4	28	24	85	−61	16	Relegation to Tercera División

Source: BDFútbol
Rules for classification: 1) points; 2) head-to-head points; 3) head-to-head goal difference; 4) goal difference; 5) number of goals scored
(P) Promoted

=== Results ===
Home \ Away	ALC	ALZ	ATL	BEN	CAR	ELC	GAN	GET	HER	LEG	LEV	OLI	ORI	ROL	TOM	TRN	TRV	VDP	VIL	YEC
Alcoyano	—	3–0	1–3	0–1	1–2	1–1	6–1	0–0	2–2	0–1	0–0	2–1	2–0	2–0	3–2	5–0	1–0	5–1	0–0	0–0
Alzira	0–2	—	0–2	0–3	0–4	0–4	1–3	0–1	2–0	0–0	1–0	0–0	2–0	2–0	0–2	1–0	2–1	0–2	1–1	0–2
Atlético Madrid B	1–0	2–1	—	1–0	1–0	1–0	2–1	0–2	0–3	0–0	1–0	1–1	1–3	0–2	3–1	4–0	1–1	3–1	1–2	0–2
Benidorm	1–1	2–0	1–0	—	0–2	0–2	2–0	1–1	1–0	1–0	0–1	1–3	1–0	0–0	0–0	1–1	0–1	1–1	2–2	1–0
Cartagena FC	3–1	2–0	2–0	2–0	—	0–0	1–1	1–0	0–1	2–0	1–0	2–2	2–0	1–0	0–0	4–0	2–0	2–0	1–0	0–0
Elche	0–0	2–1	0–2	1–1	1–1	—	3–2	0–0	4–1	0–0	3–0	6–0	4–0	3–0	1–0	4–0	1–1	2–0	1–1	3–1
Gandía	1–2	4–0	0–0	1–3	0–0	1–3	—	0–1	0–0	0–2	2–0	4–0	0–2	0–0	0–3	2–2	3–0	1–0	0–0	3–6
Getafe	1–1	5–2	1–0	1–0	3–2	1–1	3–2	—	4–2	1–0	0–2	1–0	4–0	1–0	1–0	2–0	0–1	0–0	1–0	0–0
Hércules	1–0	6–0	1–0	2–1	0–0	1–1	0–1	5–0	—	0–0	1–0	3–0	3–2	3–1	1–1	7–1	5–0	2–0	2–2	0–1
Leganés	0–0	0–0	0–4	2–2	0–0	1–1	2–2	0–0	0–3	—	1–2	1–0	2–0	2–0	2–1	1–1	1–0	0–0	1–1	1–0
Levante	1–0	4–1	1–0	1–1	0–0	0–1	1–1	0–0	0–1	3–0	—	1–1	2–1	3–1	1–0	1–1	1–1	0–0	0–0	1–1
Oliva	3–0	2–1	1–2	2–1	0–0	0–1	0–2	2–1	1–0	0–0	0–1	—	1–2	2–1	0–0	4–0	0–1	1–1	1–2	2–0
Orihuela	0–0	1–0	0–0	0–0	0–0	2–1	1–1	1–0	1–0	2–1	2–0	3–1	—	3–3	2–0	1–3	1–0	0–0	0–0	1–0
Roldán	0–1	3–1	1–2	2–1	0–1	3–0	1–0	0–0	0–0	0–1	0–0	2–0	1–1	—	1–0	3–1	0–0	1–0	0–1	0–4
Tomelloso	1–0	4–0	1–1	2–2	1–2	1–1	1–1	2–0	1–2	1–2	1–1	3–1	2–1	3–1	—	2–0	0–0	4–1	1–1	1–0
Torrent	0–0	3–2	0–2	0–2	0–2	1–1	0–0	1–3	0–2	1–2	0–4	3–1	1–3	1–1	0–2	—	0–0	2–2	2–3	2–2
Torrevieja	1–1	3–0	1–2	0–1	1–2	2–0	1–0	2–1	0–1	2–0	1–0	2–1	2–0	1–0	0–0	3–1	—	1–0	1–0	0–1
Valdepeñas	0–3	2–0	0–0	0–3	0–1	3–1	0–1	1–1	1–0	0–3	2–1	1–0	1–0	2–0	1–1	0–0	3–3	—	3–1	2–2
Villarreal	3–1	3–2	2–0	2–0	1–1	2–2	4–0	2–1	3–2	2–4	1–3	2–1	2–0	2–1	2–1	3–0	4–0	1–0	—	2–1
Yeclano	0–0	7–1	1–0	4–0	1–1	1–1	2–1	1–0	3–1	2–2	1–0	5–2	1–0	2–1	0–0	1–0	2–0	1–0	1–1	—

Source: BDFútbol
Legend: Blue = home team win; Yellow = draw; Red = away team win.

=== Top goalscorers ===
Goalscorers	Goals	Team
(Spain) Adriano García	24	Villarreal
(Spain) Manuel Alfaro	16	Atlético Madrid B
(Spain) Julián Sanz	15	Gandía
(Spain) César Melo	14	Yeclano
(Spain) Jesús de Huerta	14	Elche

=== Top goalkeepers ===
Goalkeeper	Goals	Matches	Average	Team
(Spain) Luis Raudona	14	37	0.38	Cartagena
(Spain) Juan Carlos Arévalo	27	37	0.73	Yeclano
(Spain) Javier Aguilera	29	36	0.81	Leganés
(Spain) Javier Falagán	25	30	0.83	Hércules
(Spain) Pedro Caballero	32	38	0.84	Getafe

== Group 4 ==
Teams from Andalusia, Canary Islands, Extremadura and Melilla.

=== Teams ===
Location of teams in Segunda División B Gr. 4 1991–92
Canary Islands

Team	Founded	Home city	Stadium
Badajoz	1905	Badajoz, Extremadura	Vivero
Betis Deportivo	1962	Seville, Andalusia	Benito Villamarín
Córdoba	1954	Córdoba, Andalusia	El Arcángel
Ejido	1969	El Ejido, Andalusia	Santo Domingo
Estepona	1947	Estepona, Andalusia	Francisco Muñoz Pérez
Extremadura	1924	Almendralejo, Extremadura	Francisco de la Hera
Fuengirola	1931	Fuengirola, Andalusia	Santa Fe de los Boliches
Granada	1931	Granada, Andalusia	Los Cármenes
Real Jaén	1929	Jaén, Andalusia	La Victoria
Linense	1912	La Línea de la Concepción, Andalusia	Municipal La Línea de la Concepción
Los Boliches	1973	Fuengirola, Andalusia	Santa Fe de los Boliches
Marbella	1947	Marbella, Andalusia	Municipal Marbella
Marino	1936	Playa de las Américas, Canary Islands	Antonio Domínguez Alfonso
Maspalomas	1969	Maspalomas, Canary Islands	Municipal de Maspalomas
Melilla	1976	Melilla	Álvarez Claro
Portuense	1928	El Puerto de Santa María, Andalusia	José del Cuvillo
Recreativo de Huelva	1889	Huelva, Andalusia	Colombino
Atlético Sanluqueño	1948	Sanlúcar de Barrameda, Andalusia	El Palmar
Villanovense	1951	Villanueva de la Serena, Extremadura	Romero Cuerda
Xerez	1947	Jerez de la Frontera, Andalusia	Chapín

=== League table ===
Pos	Team	Pld	W	D	L	GF	GA	GD	Pts	Qualification or relegation
1	Marbella (P)	38	24	8	6	63	25	+38	56	Qualification for the promotion playoffs
2	Badajoz (P)	38	23	7	8	71	30	+41	53	Qualification for the promotion playoffs
3	Extremadura	38	16	16	6	65	31	+34	48	Qualification for the promotion playoffs
4	Linense	38	16	15	7	45	29	+16	47	Qualification for the promotion playoffs
5	Polideportivo Ejido	38	18	9	11	46	36	+10	45	
6	Recreativo	38	16	12	10	49	35	+14	44	
7	Betis B	38	18	6	14	54	34	+20	42	
8	Xerez	38	17	7	14	49	31	+18	41	
9	Granada	38	14	12	12	47	43	+4	40	
10	Jaén	38	15	9	14	43	36	+7	39	
11	Córdoba	38	13	12	13	45	34	+11	38	
12	Marino	38	13	11	14	38	55	−17	37	
13	Estepona	38	11	12	15	33	44	−11	34 (Note: Estepona finished ahead of Melilla on head-to-head points: Melilla–Estepona 0–0, Estepona–Melilla 2–0)	
14	Melilla	38	10	14	14	21	33	−12	34	
15	Portuense	38	9	15	14	34	49	−15	33 (Note: Portuense finished ahead of Maspalomas on head-to-head points: Portuense–Maspalomas 0–0, Maspalomas–Portuense 0–1)	
16	Maspalomas	38	12	9	17	48	46	+2	33	
17	Atlético Sanluqueño	38	10	11	17	33	51	−18	31	Relegation to Tercera División
18	Fuengirola	38	9	7	22	26	65	−39	25	Relegation to Tercera División
19	Los Boliches	38	7	7	24	32	84	−52	21	Relegation to Tercera División
20	Villanovense (Note: Villanovense was dissolved at the end of the season)	38	6	7	25	20	71	−51	19	Dissolved

Source: BDFútbol
Rules for classification: 1) points; 2) head-to-head points; 3) head-to-head goal difference; 4) goal difference; 5) number of goals scored
(P) Promoted

=== Results ===
Home \ Away	BAD	BET	COR	EJI	EST	EXT	FUE	GRA	JAE	LNS	LBO	MAB	MAR	MAS	MEL	POR	REC	SLU	VIL	XER
Badajoz	—	4–1	2–0	0–0	4–0	3–1	4–0	1–4	3–1	0–0	3–0	3–1	3–1	6–1	1–0	3–0	1–0	3–0	3–0	2–1
Betis Deportivo	0–0	—	0–0	1–0	4–1	0–1	5–2	2–1	3–1	0–1	3–1	0–1	2–0	4–1	0–1	4–0	1–0	5–0	3–1	0–2
Córdoba	1–0	0–0	—	0–1	3–0	0–2	5–1	1–1	2–1	1–0	2–0	0–0	1–1	2–1	4–0	1–1	1–1	1–0	3–0	1–1
Ejido	4–0	2–0	3–0	—	0–2	0–0	1–0	3–1	1–0	1–1	2–0	2–1	1–0	1–0	0–1	0–0	1–0	4–0	4–0	0–0
Estepona	3–5	2–0	2–1	0–0	—	1–0	2–0	0–0	3–1	2–0	2–1	0–1	1–1	0–1	2–0	0–0	0–1	2–0	1–1	0–2
Extremadura	0–0	2–0	2–0	7–2	1–1	—	4–0	0–0	2–0	1–1	6–0	0–3	3–1	1–1	3–0	4–0	1–1	2–0	4–0	2–1
Fuengirola	0–2	0–3	1–0	1–1	1–0	0–0	—	3–1	1–0	0–0	0–1	1–2	2–2	0–5	1–0	0–0	1–1	1–0	1–0	1–2
Granada	4–1	0–2	1–0	0–1	0–0	0–0	3–0	—	3–1	1–0	1–0	1–2	1–1	2–1	0–0	2–1	1–1	2–1	3–2	0–3
Jaén	3–0	0–2	1–1	0–0	0–0	1–0	3–1	0–0	—	3–1	2–0	0–0	2–1	0–1	2–0	2–2	3–0	3–1	1–0	0–1
Linense	1–0	0–1	2–1	4–1	2–1	1–1	1–2	0–0	2–1	—	5–1	0–0	1–0	2–0	2–1	1–2	2–0	2–1	2–0	1–0
Los Boliches	0–3	3–1	2–1	0–2	0–0	1–3	2–2	1–5	0–1	2–3	—	0–1	0–0	1–0	4–3	1–1	0–0	0–2	4–1	1–0
Marbella	2–1	1–0	0–0	1–0	1–2	2–2	2–0	6–1	1–0	0–0	4–1	—	5–0	1–0	1–1	5–0	2–3	2–0	3–1	1–0
Marino	0–0	2–1	2–1	0–2	3–1	1–0	3–1	2–1	0–0	0–0	2–2	2–3	—	1–0	2–0	1–0	1–0	2–3	0–0	1–0
Maspalomas	0–2	0–0	2–1	4–1	0–0	2–4	1–0	3–1	0–0	1–3	8–1	0–1	1–2	—	1–1	0–1	0–2	1–0	8–1	1–0
Melilla	0–0	0–0	0–2	0–1	0–0	1–1	1–0	0–0	0–0	0–0	3–0	0–2	1–0	1–1	—	0–0	1–0	1–0	1–0	0–0
Portuense	0–2	0–0	0–0	2–0	4–0	2–0	3–1	0–2	1–2	1–1	2–0	2–4	1–0	0–0	0–2	—	0–1	1–2	1–1	1–1
Recreativo	1–0	2–0	0–3	3–0	2–1	1–1	2–0	1–1	0–3	1–1	6–1	0–1	6–1	2–0	0–0	3–3	—	1–1	1–0	3–1
Atlético Sanluqueño	0–0	0–2	2–2	4–3	1–1	1–1	0–1	2–1	1–2	0–0	0–0	0–0	0–0	0–0	2–0	3–1	1–1	—	3–0	0–3
Villanovense	0–4	1–4	1–0	0–0	1–0	1–1	1–0	0–2	0–2	1–1	1–0	1–0	1–2	1–1	0–1	0–1	0–1	0–1	—	1–0
Xerez	0–2	1–0	0–3	3–1	2–0	2–2	2–0	1–0	2–1	1–1	3–1	1–0	8–0	0–1	1–0	0–0	0–1	0–1	4–1	—

Source: BDFútbol
Legend: Blue = home team win; Yellow = draw; Red = away team win.

=== Top goalscorers ===
Goalscorers	Goals	Team
(Spain) Rafael Pozo	23	Badajoz
(Spain) Manuel Sousa	16	Marbella
(Spain) Manuel Mosquera	16	Extremadura
(Spain) Víctor Bermúdez	14	Maspalomas
(Spain) José Luis Sarabia	12	Badajoz

=== Top goalkeepers ===
Goalkeeper	Goals	Matches	Average	Team
(Spain) Francisco Leal	23	37	0.62	Marbella
(Spain) José Requena	25	37	0.68	Linense
(Spain) José Luis Diezma	27	34	0.79	Extremadura
(Spain) José Luis Montes	33	38	0.87	Melilla
(Spain) José Manuel Pariente	29	33	0.88	Recreativo
