= CD Villanovense =

Defunct Spanish football club

Villanovense
- Full name: Club Deportivo Villanovense
- Founded: 1951
- Dissolved: 1992
- Ground: Romero Cuerda, Villanueva de la Serena, Extremadura, Spain
- Capacity: 4,000
Home colours

Club Deportivo Villanovense was a Spanish football team based in Villanueva de la Serena, in the autonomous community of Extremadura. Founded in 1951, it was dissolved in 1992 and subsequently replaced by CF Villanovense.

== Honours ==
- Extremadura Championship
  - Runners-up (1): 1929–30

== Season to season ==
Season	Tier	Division	Place	Copa del Rey
1951–52	4	1ª Reg.	7th	
1952–53	4	1ª Reg.	2nd	
1953–54	4	1ª Reg.	1st	
1954–55	3	3ª	5th	
1955–56	3	3ª	8th	
1956–57	3	3ª	6th	
1957–58	4	1ª Reg.	4th	
1958–59	5	2ª Reg.		
1959–60	4	1ª Reg.	10th	
1960–61	DNP			
1961–62	DNP			
1962–63	4	1ª Reg.	9th	
1963–64	DNP			
1964–65	DNP			
1965–66	DNP			
1966–67	5	2ª Reg.	5th	
1967–68	DNP			
1968–69	DNP			
1969–70	DNP			
1970–71	5	2ª Reg.	1st	

Season	Tier	Division	Place	Copa del Rey
1971–72	4	1ª Reg.	6th	
1972–73	4	1ª Reg.	5th	
1973–74	4	1ª Reg.	7th	
1974–75	4	Reg. Pref.	16th	
1975–76	4	Reg. Pref.	8th	
1976–77	4	Reg. Pref.	8th	
1977–78	5	Reg. Pref.	1st	
1978–79	4	3ª	6th	First round
1979–80	4	3ª	8th	Second round
1980–81	4	3ª	15th	Second round
1981–82	4	3ª	18th	
1982–83	5	Reg. Pref.	2nd	
1983–84	4	3ª	9th	
1984–85	4	3ª	6th	
1985–86	4	3ª	12th	First round
1986–87	4	3ª	15th	
1987–88	4	3ª	11th	
1988–89	4	3ª	6th	
1989–90	4	3ª	6th	
1990–91	4	3ª	4th	First round

Season	Tier	Division	Place	Copa del Rey
1991–92	3	2ª B	20th	First round

- 1 season in Segunda División B
- 15 seasons in Tercera División
