= Adriano García =

Spanish footballer

Personal information
- Full name: Adriano García García
- Date of birth: 22 December 1965 (age 60)
- Place of birth: Píñar, Spain
- Height: 1.74 m (5 ft 9 in)
- Position: Forward

Senior career*
Years	Team	Apps	(Gls)
- Villarreal CF
- CE Sabadell FC
- Hércules CF
- * Club domestic league appearances and goals

Adriano García García (born 22 December 1965), known as Adriano García or simply Adriano, is a Spanish former footballer who played as a forward. He played for Villarreal CF, CE Sabadell FC and Hércules CF.

He was for many years the all-time leading goalscorer of Villarreal CF. According to 100 años de fútbol en Vila-real, a centenary history of football in the city published in 2023, Adriano scored 106 official goals for Villarreal. His record was surpassed in 2023 by Gerard Moreno, who reached 107 goals for the club.

== Career ==
Adriano was born in Piñar, in the province of Granada. He played as a forward and represented Villarreal CF, CE Sabadell FC and Hércules CF during his career.

With Sabadell, he played in La Liga during the 1986–87 and 1987–88 seasons. BDFutbol credits him with 34 appearances and two goals in the Spanish top flight.

Adriano is particularly associated with Villarreal CF, where he played during the years before the club became established in professional football. The club's centenary history records him as one of the players involved in several of the club's promotions, including the 1991–92 promotion from Segunda División B to Segunda División. In 2022, AS described him as a historic Villarreal player and one of the figures of the club's 1992 promotion to the second tier.

== Villarreal records ==
The 2023 book 100 años de fútbol en Vila-real lists Adriano as Villarreal CF's historical top scorer with 106 goals: 68 in Segunda División B, 30 in Tercera División, six in the Copa del Rey and two in promotion play-offs.

The same source also records him as Villarreal's top scorer in Segunda División B, with 68 goals, and as the player with the most appearances for the club in that category, with 119 matches.

In August 2023, Villarreal forward Gerard Moreno surpassed Adriano's total after scoring his 107th goal for the club.

== Personal life ==
Adriano is the father of footballer Carlo Adriano García Prades, who also came through Villarreal's system.
