= CD Valdepeñas =

Spanish football team

Valdepeñas
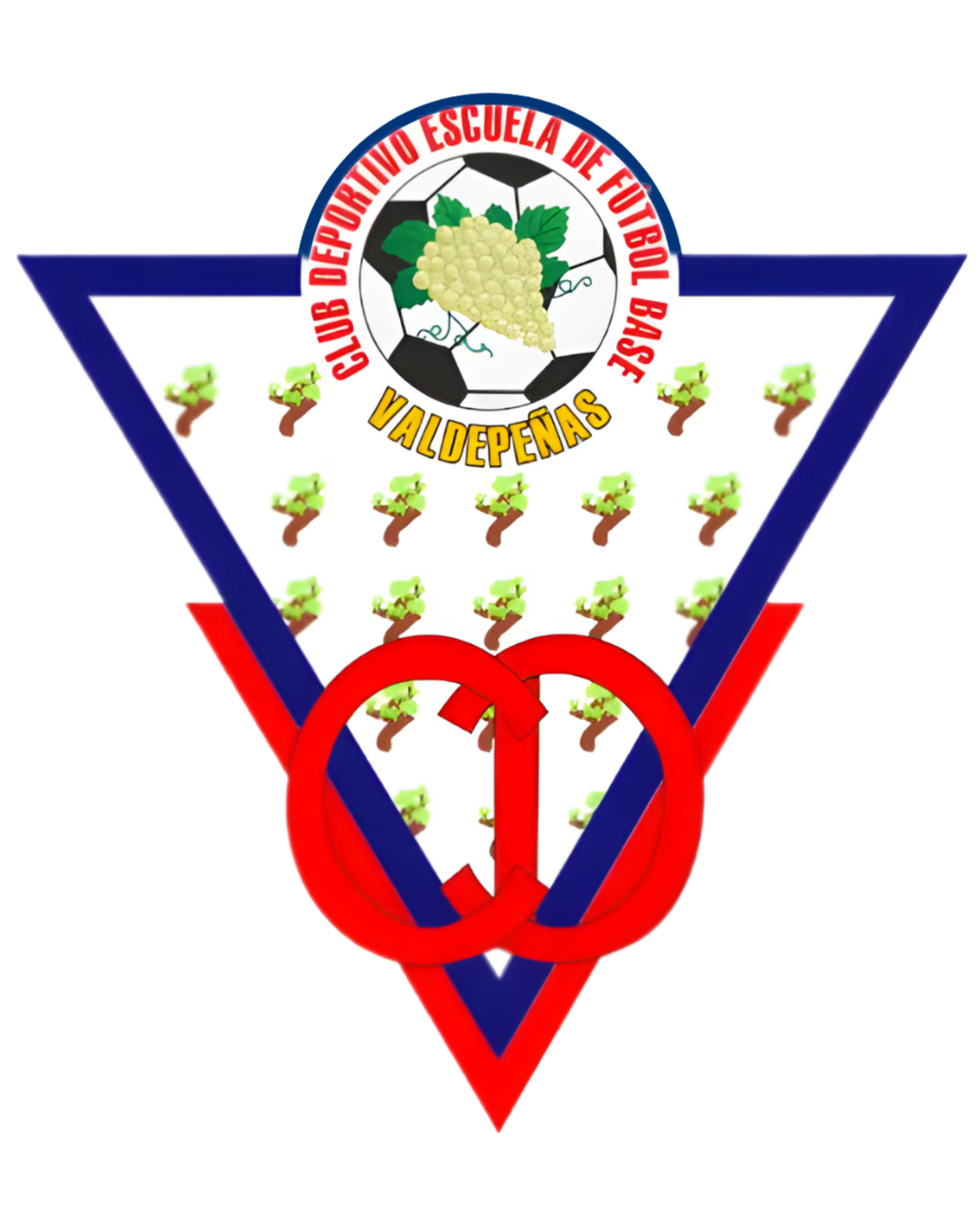
- Full name: Club Deportivo Escuela Fútbol Base Valdepeñas
- Founded: 6 November 1947; 78 years ago 1965 (refounded); 2005 (refounded)
- Ground: Polideportivo La Molineta, Valdepeñas, Ciudad Real, Castile-La Mancha, Spain
- Capacity: 2,000
- Chairman: Antonio de la Torre Camacho
- Manager: Armindo Ceccon
- League: Primera Autonómica Preferente – Group 1
- 2025–26: Primera Autonómica Preferente – Group 1, 13th of 18
Home colours	Away colours

Carretero Maquinaria Club Deportivo Valdepeñas is a Spanish football team based in Valdepeñas, in the autonomous community of Castile-La Mancha. Founded in 1947 and refounded in 2005, they play in Primera Autonómica Preferente – Group 1, holding home matches at Polideportivo La Molineta.

== History ==
=== Club background ===
- Club Deportivo Valdepeñas (1947–1954; 1969–1993)
- Olímpico Valdepeñas (1965–1966)
- Valdepeñas Club de Fútbol (1966–1969)
- Club de Fútbol Valdepeñas (1993–2005)
- Club Deportivo Básico Escuela de Fútbol Valdepeñas (2005–20XX)
- Club Deportivo Escuela de Fútbol Base Valdepeñas (20XX–2021)
- YDRAY Club Deportivo Escuela de Fútbol Base Valdepeñas (2021–2022)
- I3 Club Deportivo Escuela de Fútbol Base Valdepeñas (2022–2023)
- Sánchez Mellado Club Deportivo Valdepeñas (2023–2024)
- Carretero Maquinaria Club Deportivo Valdepeñas (2024–present)

== Season to season ==
Season	Tier	Division	Place	Copa del Rey
1947–48	4	1ª Reg.	3rd	
1948–49	4	1ª Reg.	3rd	
1949–50	3	3ª	18th	
1950–51	3	3ª	12th	
1951–52	3	3ª	8th	
1952–53	3	3ª	10th	
1953–54	3	3ª	17th	
1954–1965	DNP			
1965–66	4	1ª Reg.	2nd	
1966–67	3	3ª	12th	
1967–68	3	3ª	2nd	
1968–69	3	3ª	14th	
1969–70	3	3ª	5th	Second round
1970–71	3	3ª	10th	Second round
1971–72	3	3ª	4th	Second round
1972–73	3	3ª	5th	Fourth round
1973–74	3	3ª	18th	First round
1974—75	4	Reg. Pref.	6th	
1975–76	4	Reg. Pref.	1st	
1976–77	3	3ª	14th	First round

Season	Tier	Division	Place	Copa del Rey
1977–78	4	3ª	10th	First round
1978–79	4	3ª	7th	First round
1979–80	4	3ª	10th	First round
1980–81	4	3ª	7th	First round
1981–82	4	3ª	4th	
1982–83	4	3ª	13th	First round
1983–84	4	3ª	15th	
1984–85	4	3ª	2nd	
1985–86	4	3ª	2nd	First round
1986–87	4	3ª	14th	First round
1987–88	4	3ª	17th	
1988–89	4	3ª	9th	
1989–90	4	3ª	1st	
1990–91	3	2ª B	11th	Third round
1991–92	3	2ª B	15th	First round
1992–93	3	2ª B	18th	Second round
1993–94	5	Reg. Pref.	3rd	Expelled
1994–95	4	3ª	8th	
1995–96	4	3ª	7th	
1996–97	4	3ª	5th	

Season	Tier	Division	Place	Copa del Rey
1997–98	4	3ª	15th	
1998–99	4	3ª	9th	
1999–2000	4	3ª	10th	
2000–01	4	3ª	13th	
2001–02	4	3ª	17th	
2002–03	4	3ª	20th	
2003–04	5	1ª Aut.	4th	
2004–05	5	1ª Aut.	(R)	
2005–06	6	2ª Aut.	4th	
2006–07	6	2ª Aut.	1st	
2007–08	5	Aut. Pref.	18th	
2008–09	6	1ª Aut.	14th	
2009–10	6	1ª Aut.	7th	
2010–11	6	1ª Aut.	7th	
2011–12	6	1ª Aut.	2nd	
2012–13	5	Aut. Pref.	16th	
2013–14	6	1ª Aut.	9th	
2014–15	6	1ª Aut.	2nd	
2015–16	5	Aut. Pref.	6th	
2016–17	5	Aut. Pref.	6th	

Season	Tier	Division	Place	Copa del Rey
2017–18	5	Aut. Pref.	15th	
2018–19	6	1ª Aut.	6th	
2019–20	6	1ª Aut.	1st	
2020–21	5	Aut. Pref.	9th	
2021–22	6	Aut. Pref.	5th	
2022–23	6	Aut. Pref.	6th	
2023–24	6	Aut. Pref.	2nd	
2024–25	5	3ª Fed.	16th	
2025–26	6	Aut. Pref.	13th	

- 3 seasons in Segunda División B
- 37 seasons in Tercera División
- 1 season in Tercera Federación
