= CD Logroñés B =

Spanish football team

Logroñés B
- Full name: Club Deportivo Logroñés "B", S.A.D.
- Founded: 1950
- Dissolved: 2000
- Ground: Mundial 82, Logroño, La Rioja, Spain
- Capacity: 3,500
Home colours	Away colours

Club Deportivo Logroñés "B", S.A.D. was a Spanish football team based in Logroño, in the autonomous community of La Rioja. Founded in 1950, it was the reserve team of CD Logroñés, and was dissolved in 2000.

== History ==
=== Club background ===
- Club Deportivo Recreación de Logroño (1950–1968)
- Club Deportivo Logroñés Promesas (1968–1991)
- Club Deportivo Logroñés "B" (1968–1991)

== Season to season ==
Season	Tier	Division	Place	Copa del Rey
1950–51	3	3ª	14th	
1951–52	3	3ª	4th	
1952–53	3	3ª	17th	
1953–54	4	1ª Reg.	1st	
1954–55	3	3ª	5th	
1955–56	3	3ª	12th	
1956–57	4	1ª Reg.	5th	
1957–58	4	1ª Reg.	10th	
1958–59	3	3ª	12th	
1959–60	4	1ª Reg.	1st	
1960–61	3	3ª	15th	
1961–62	3	3ª	16th	
1962–63	4	1ª Reg.	5th	
1963–64	4	1ª Reg.	3rd	
1964–65	4	1ª Reg.	8th	
1965–66	4	1ª Reg.	5th	
1966–67	4	1ª Reg.	3rd	
1967–68	4	1ª Reg.	13th	
1968–69	4	1ª Reg.	5th	
1969–70	4	1ª Reg.	2nd	

Season	Tier	Division	Place	Copa del Rey
1970–71	4	1ª Reg.	14th	
1971–72	4	1ª Reg.	17th	
1972–73	4	1ª Reg.	1st	
1973–74	4	1ª Reg.	7th	
1974–75	4	Reg. Pref.	17th	
1975–76	5	1ª Reg.	1st	
1976–77	4	Reg. Pref.	18th	
1977–78	6	1ª Reg.	6th	
1978–79	6	1ª Reg.	3rd	
1979–80	6	1ª Reg.	6th	
1980–81	6	1ª Reg.	1st	
1981–82	5	Reg. Pref.	8th	
1982–83	5	Reg. Pref.	19th	
1983–84	6	1ª Reg.	6th	
1984–85	6	1ª Reg.	7th	
1985–86	6	1ª Reg.	2nd	
1986–87	5	Reg. Pref.	1st	
1987–88	4	3ª	10th	
1988–89	4	3ª	10th	
1989–90	4	3ª	12th	

Season	Tier	Division	Place
1990–91	4	3ª	2nd
1991–92	3	2ª B	16th
1992–93	3	2ª B	12th
1993–94	3	2ª B	9th
1994–95	3	2ª B	12th

Season	Tier	Division	Place
1995–96	3	2ª B	16th
1996–97	3	2ª B	20th
1997–98	4	3ª	3rd
1998–99	4	3ª	4th
1999–2000	4	3ª	4th

- 6 seasons in Segunda División B
- 15 seasons in Tercera División
