= Chili (footballer) =

Spanish footballer (born 1968)

Vicente Allende Barreda (born 8 May 1968) is a Spanish former footballer who played as a forward.

== Early life ==
Chili was born in Paris, France, and started playing football at the age of six.

== Club career ==
In 1992, Chili signed for Spanish La Liga side Racing Santander, where he made thirty-six league appearances and scored nine goals and suffered relegation to the Spanish second tier. In 1995, he signed for Spanish third tier side La Palmas, helping them earn promotion to the Spanish second tier before leaving due to disciplinary issues. After that, he signed for Spanish side Gimnástica de Torrelavega.

== International career ==
Chili played for the Cantabria autonomous football team.

== Style of play ==
Chili mainly operated as a striker and was known for his speed and left-footed ability.

== Post-playing career ==
After retiring from professional football, Chili stopped working entirely for some time after making investments.
