= 1995–96 Segunda División =

65th season of the second-tier football league in Spain

Segunda División
- Season: 1995–96
- Champions: Hércules CF
- Promoted: Hércules CF; CD Logroñés; CF Extremadura
- Relegated: Sestao Sport Club; Athletic de Bilbao B; Getafe CF; Atlético Marbella
- Matches: 380
- Goals: 886 (2.33 per match)
- Top goalscorer: (Spain) Manel

The 1995–96 Segunda División season saw 20 teams participate in the second flight Spanish league. Hércules CF won the league.

Hércules CF, CD Logroñés and CF Extremadura were promoted to Primera División. Sestao, Athletic de Bilbao B, Getafe CF and Atlético Marbella were relegated to Segunda División B.

From this season, wins worth 3 points instead of 2.

== Teams ==
Location of teams in Segunda División 1995-96

Team	Home city	Stadium
Alavés	Vitoria-Gasteiz	Mendizorrotza
Almería	Almería	Antonio Franco Navarro
Athletic Bilbao B	Bilbao	San Mamés
Badajoz	Badajoz	El Vivero
Barcelona B	Barcelona	Mini Estadi
Écija	Écija	San Pablo
Eibar	Eibar	Ipurua
Extremadura	Almendralejo	Francisco de la Hera
Getafe	Getafe	Las Margaritas
Hércules	Alicante	José Rico Pérez
Leganés	Leganés	Luis Rodríguez de Miguel
Lleida	Lleida	Camp d'Esports
Logroñés	Logroño	Las Gaunas
Mallorca	Mallorca	Lluís Sitjar
Atlético Marbella	Marbella	Municipal de Marbella
Osasuna	Pamplona	El Sadar
Real Madrid B	Madrid	Ciudad Deportiva
Sestao	Sestao	Las Llanas
Toledo	Toledo	Salto del Caballo
Villarreal	Villarreal	El Madrigal

=== Teams by Autonomous Community ===
	Autonomous community	Number of teams	Teams
1	(Basque Country (autonomous community)) Basque Country	4	Alavés, Athletic Bilbao B, Eibar, Sestao
2	Andalusia	3	Almería, Écija, Marbella
2	Madrid	3	Getafe, Leganés, Real Madrid B
4	Catalonia	2	Barcelona B, Lleida
4	Extremadura	2	Badajoz, Extremadura
4	Valencia	2	Hércules, Villarreal
7	Balearic Islands	1	Mallorca
7	Castile-La Mancha	1	Toledo
7	La Rioja	1	Logroñés
7	Navarre	1	Osasuna

== Final table ==
Pos	Team	Pld	W	D	L	GF	GA	GD	Pts	Promotion or relegation
1	Hércules CF	38	21	10	7	61	30	+31	73	Promoted to Primera División
2	CD Logroñés	38	20	9	9	69	49	+20	69	Promoted to Primera División
3	RCD Mallorca	38	20	9	9	59	35	+24	69	Promotion playoff
4	Real Madrid B (Note: Real Madrid B was ineligible for promotion for being reserve team of Real Madrid.)	38	18	10	10	50	41	+9	64	
5	CF Extremadura	38	17	11	10	48	33	+15	62	Promotion playoff
6	CD Badajoz	38	18	8	12	48	31	+17	62	
7	Deportivo Alavés	38	17	10	11	52	42	+10	61	
8	CD Leganés	38	17	10	11	42	40	+2	61	
9	CD Toledo	38	16	11	11	38	30	+8	59	
10	CA Osasuna	38	15	7	16	49	43	+6	52	
11	UE Lleida	38	12	12	14	40	49	−9	48	
12	SD Eibar	38	10	16	12	24	31	−7	46	
13	Écija	38	12	9	17	34	60	−26	45	
14	Barcelona B	38	13	5	20	55	63	−8	44	
15	Villarreal CF	38	11	11	16	32	39	−7	44	
16	Almería CF	38	10	14	14	42	47	−5	44	
17	Sestao (Note: Sestao was relegated to Tercera División for not paying its players. Later, the club disappeared.)	38	10	12	16	36	45	−9	42	Relegated to Segunda División B
18	Athletic de Bilbao B	38	10	10	18	49	63	−14	40	Relegated to Segunda División B
19	Getafe CF	38	7	11	20	30	52	−22	32	Relegated to Segunda División B
20	Atlético Marbella	38	4	9	25	28	63	−35	21	Relegated to Segunda División B

== Results ==
Home \ Away	ALV	ALM	ATH	BAD	BAR	ÉCI	EIB	EXT	GET	HÉR	LEG	LLE	LOG	MLL	MAR	OSA	RMC	SES	TOL	VIL
Alavés	—	1–0	2–2	0–1	2–0	1–3	1–1	1–2	1–0	1–0	3–1	1–0	3–1	2–1	4–1	1–0	2–0	0–1	2–0	0–2
Almería	2–1	—	2–1	0–1	1–3	4–1	1–0	1–1	0–1	0–0	1–1	0–0	3–1	0–0	2–3	4–3	1–3	2–2	2–0	0–0
Athletic B	2–2	4–1	—	1–1	0–2	0–0	0–0	1–0	3–2	4–1	1–2	1–1	1–1	3–1	3–1	1–2	0–0	1–3	1–3	0–2
Badajoz	0–0	1–1	1–0	—	2–1	0–1	4–0	2–1	2–0	0–1	0–1	3–1	1–1	0–1	2–0	2–1	0–1	0–1	0–0	2–0
Barcelona B	2–3	1–0	3–4	1–5	—	4–1	0–0	0–1	0–3	3–1	1–0	1–1	1–3	0–1	3–2	3–0	1–3	5–0	0–1	1–0
Écija	2–2	2–0	1–3	0–2	1–2	—	2–1	3–2	3–0	1–0	1–2	0–0	3–2	1–0	1–0	0–1	0–4	0–0	0–0	1–1
Eibar	1–1	0–1	1–1	0–0	3–1	3–1	—	1–0	1–1	0–0	1–0	1–1	1–0	0–1	1–0	0–2	2–1	1–0	1–1	1–0
Extremadura	1–0	1–1	4–2	3–1	3–1	0–0	1–0	—	1–1	1–1	0–1	4–0	3–2	1–2	2–1	2–1	0–0	1–1	0–0	1–0
Getafe	0–2	2–2	1–2	0–3	2–6	0–0	1–1	1–0	—	0–0	1–2	2–3	0–2	0–1	2–1	1–1	1–2	0–0	0–2	1–0
Hércules	6–2	2–1	2–0	1–0	3–1	1–2	0–1	1–0	3–0	—	2–2	1–1	5–1	2–2	1–1	1–0	4–1	1–0	4–0	2–1
Leganés	1–1	0–0	0–0	0–2	3–1	3–1	1–0	1–0	1–3	0–1	—	1–1	1–2	3–2	1–1	1–0	2–1	1–1	0–0	2–0
Lleida	0–3	1–1	1–0	2–1	2–1	4–0	3–0	1–3	1–0	0–2	4–1	—	2–0	1–2	1–0	1–1	0–3	1–0	0–2	1–0
Logroñés	1–1	2–1	3–1	1–1	1–1	3–0	0–0	1–0	1–0	0–0	3–1	3–1	—	2–2	2–0	3–2	3–3	1–0	3–1	2–1
Mallorca	2–1	0–1	2–0	3–0	3–0	4–1	1–1	1–2	2–0	2–0	1–1	0–0	0–4	—	1–1	2–1	0–0	2–1	0–1	1–1
Marbella	1–1	1–1	3–1	0–1	1–3	0–0	2–0	0–2	0–4	1–2	1–2	0–0	1–4	1–4	—	0–1	0–1	0–1	0–1	0–2
Osasuna	1–2	1–0	2–0	2–0	4–2	5–0	1–0	0–0	1–0	0–1	0–1	1–1	5–3	0–2	3–1	—	0–1	0–2	0–0	0–0
R. Madrid B	2–1	1–1	1–2	1–0	2–0	1–0	0–0	2–2	2–0	0–1	1–0	3–1	1–3	0–3	2–1	2–0	—	1–0	0–0	0–4
Sestao	0–0	0–4	5–3	1–3	0–0	0–1	0–0	0–1	0–0	1–2	2–0	4–1	0–2	2–0	0–0	2–2	3–0	—	0–1	2–2
Toledo	2–0	4–0	1–0	2–3	1–0	3–0	0–0	0–1	0–0	0–0	0–1	1–0	1–2	0–4	1–2	0–1	2–2	4–1	—	1–0
Villarreal	0–1	1–0	3–0	1–1	0–0	1–0	1–0	1–1	0–0	0–6	0–1	2–1	1–0	1–3	0–0	1–4	1–1	2–0	0–2	—

Source: BDFutbol
Legend: Blue = home team win; Yellow = draw; Red = away team win.

== Promotion playoff ==
Team 1	Agg.	Team 2	1st leg	2nd leg
RCD Mallorca	1–2	Rayo Vallecano	1–0	0–2
CF Extremadura	2–0	Albacete Balompié	1–0	1–0

=== First leg ===
29 May 1996	RCD Mallorca	1–0	Rayo Vallecano	Palma de Mallorca
21:30	Morales 30'	Report (in Spanish)		Stadium: Lluís Sitjar; Attendance: 17,000; Referee: Celino Gracia Redondo (Aragon)

30 May 1996	CF Extremadura	1–0	Albacete Balompié	Almendralejo
21:30	Manuel 54'	Report (in Spanish)		Stadium: Francisco de la Hera; Attendance: 11,000; Referee: José María García-Aranda (Community of Madrid)

=== Second leg ===
1 June 1996	Rayo Vallecano	2–0 (2–1 agg.)	RCD Mallorca	Madrid
20:30	Guilherme 13'; Onésimo 81'	Report (in Spanish)		Stadium: Vallecas; Attendance: 14,000; Referee: Antonio Jesús López Nieto (Andalusia)

2 June 1996	Albacete Balompié	0–1 (0–2 agg.)	CF Extremadura	Albacete
21:30		Report (in Spanish)	Tirado 90'	Stadium: Carlos Belmonte; Attendance: 17,000; Referee: Víctor Esquinas Torres (Andalusia)
