= CD Roldán =

Association football club in Spain

Roldán
- Full name: Club Deportivo Roldán
- Founded: 1969
- Dissolved: 1996
- Ground: San José, Roldán, Torre-Pacheco, Murcia, Spain
- 1995–96: 3ª – Group 13, 19th
Home colours

Club Deportivo Roldán is a Spanish football club based in Roldán, Torre-Pacheco, in the Region of Murcia. Founded in 1969, the club was dissolved in 1996.

== History ==
Founded in 1969, Roldán played in the regional leagues until 1988, when they achieved promotion to Tercera División. After three seasons, they achieved a first-ever promotion to Segunda División B, but suffered an immediate relegation shortly after.

After four consecutive seasons in the fourth division, the club folded in 1996, after suffering another relegation. In 2017, after 21 years without a club in the city, Roldán CD was created.

== Season to season ==
Season	Tier	Division	Place	Copa del Rey
1969–70	5	2ª Reg.	12th	
1970–71	5	2ª Reg.	9th	
1971–72	6	2ª Reg.	11th	
1972–73	6	2ª Reg.	2nd	
1973–74	6	2ª Reg.	6th	
1974–75	6	2ª Reg.	5th	
1975–76	6	2ª Reg.	3rd	
1976–77	5	1ª Reg.	14th	
1977–78	6	1ª Reg.	13th	
1978–79	6	1ª Reg.	4th	
1979–80	6	1ª Reg.	10th	
1980–81	5	Reg. Pref.	17th	
1981–82	6	1ª Reg.	5th	
1982–83	6	1ª Reg.	(R)	

Season	Tier	Division	Place	Copa del Rey
1983–84	6	1ª Reg.	7th	
1984–85	6	1ª Reg.	12th	
1985–86	6	1ª Reg.	6th	
1986–87	6	1ª Reg.	8th	
1987–88	5	Reg. Pref.	4th	
1988–89	4	3ª	17th	
1989–90	4	3ª	5th	
1990–91	4	3ª	1st	Second round
1991–92	3	2ª B	17th	Second round
1992–93	4	3ª	3rd	Second round
1993–94	4	3ª	2nd	Second round
1994–95	4	3ª	10th	
1995–96	4	3ª	19th	

- 1 season in Segunda División B
- 7 seasons in Tercera División
