= UD Oliva =

Oliva
- Full name: Unión Deportiva Oliva
- Founded: 1946
- Ground: El Morer, Valencia, Spain
- Capacity: 2,500
- President: Vicent Mayol
- Head coach: Vicent Fuster
- League: Segona FFCV – Group 6
- 2024–25: Segona FFCV – Group 6, 7th of 16
Home colours	Away colours

Unión Deportiva Oliva is a Spanish football team based in Valencia, in the Valencian Community. Founded in 1946, it plays in Segona FFCV – Group 6, holding home matches at Estadio El Morer.

== Season to season ==
Season	Tier	Division	Place	Copa del Rey
1947–48	5	2ª Reg.	1st	
1948–49	5	2ª Reg.	3rd	
1949–50	DNP			
1950–51	5	2ª Reg.		
1951–52	5	2ª Reg.	3rd	
1952–53	5	2ª Reg.	4th	
1953–54	5	2ª Reg.	5th	
1954–55	5	2ª Reg.	7th	
1955–56	5	2ª Reg.	2nd	
1956–57	4	1ª Reg.	3rd	
1957–58	4	1ª Reg.	3rd	
1958–59	4	1ª Reg.	6th	
1959–60	4	1ª Reg.	3rd	
1960–61	4	1ª Reg.	1st	
1961–62	3	3ª	6th	
1962–63	3	3ª	4th	
1963–64	3	3ª	14th	
1964–65	3	3ª	13th	
1965–66	3	3ª	17th	
1966–67	3	3ª	18th	

Season	Tier	Division	Place	Copa del Rey
1967–68	4	1ª Reg.	8th	
1968–69	4	1ª Reg.	3rd	
1969–70	3	3ª	14th	First round
1970–71	4	Reg. Pref.	20th	
1971–72	5	1ª Reg.	6th	
1972–73	5	1ª Reg.	12th	
1973–74	5	1ª Reg.	6th	
1974–75	5	1ª Reg.	20th	
1975–76	6	2ª Reg.	18th	
1976–77	6	2ª Reg.	2nd	
1977–78	6	1ª Reg.	2nd	
1978–79	6	1ª Reg.	6th	
1979–80	6	1ª Reg.	6th	
1980–81	6	1ª Reg.	21st	
1981–82	7	2ª Reg.	1st	
1982–83	6	1ª Reg.	5th	
1983–84	6	1ª Reg.	1st	
1984–85	5	Reg. Pref.	2nd	
1985–86	5	Reg. Pref.	9th	
1986–87	5	Reg. Pref.	13th	

Season	Tier	Division	Place	Copa del Rey
1987–88	5	Reg. Pref.	17th	
1988–89	5	Reg. Pref.	2nd	
1989–90	4	3ª	1st	
1990–91	4	3ª	1st	First round
1991–92	3	2ª B	18th	Third round
1992–93	4	3ª	4th	First round
1993–94	4	3ª	13th	
1994–95	4	3ª	19th	
1995–96	5	Reg. Pref.	10th	
1996–97	5	Reg. Pref.	14th	
1997–98	5	Reg. Pref.	10th	
1998–99	5	Reg. Pref.	14th	
1999–2000	5	Reg. Pref.	12th	
2000–01	5	Reg. Pref.	1st	
2001–02	5	Reg. Pref.	2nd	
2002–03	5	Reg. Pref.	1st	
2003–04	4	3ª	15th	
2004–05	4	3ª	16th	
2005–06	4	3ª	17th	
2006–07	4	3ª	21st	

Season	Tier	Division	Place	Copa del Rey
2007–08	5	Reg. Pref.	7th	
2008–09	5	Reg. Pref.	6th	
2009–10	5	Reg. Pref.	18th	
2010–11	6	1ª Reg.	10th	
2011–12	6	1ª Reg.	14th	
2012–13	7	2ª Reg.	2nd	
2013–14	6	1ª Reg.	10th	
2014–15	6	1ª Reg.	2nd	
2015–16	5	Reg. Pref.	15th	
2016–17	5	Reg. Pref.	17th	
2017–18	6	1ª Reg.	3rd	
2018–19	6	1ª Reg.	5th	
2019–20	6	1ª Reg.	3rd	
2020–21	6	1ª Reg.	4th	
2021–22	7	1ª Reg.	9th	
2022–23	7	1ª Reg.	7th	
2023–24	8	2ª FFCV	7th	
2024–25	8	2ª FFCV	7th	
2025–26	8	2ª FFCV	1st	
2026–27	7	1ª FFCV		

- 1 season in Segunda División B
- 16 seasons in Tercera División
