= CD Mosconia =

Association football club in Spain

Coordinates: 43.382845°N 6.075664°W

Mosconia
- Full name: Club Deportivo Mosconia
- Founded: 1945; 81 years ago 1961; 65 years ago (refounded)
- Ground: Marqués de La Vega de Anzo, Grado, Asturias, Spain
- Capacity: 4,100
- President: Mónica Fernández Fidalgo
- Head coach: Alejandro Rodríguez Rodríguez
- League: Tercera Federación – Group 2
- 2025–26: Tercera Federación – Group 2, 5th of 18
- Website: cdmosconia.es
Home colours	Away colours

Club Deportivo Mosconia is a football team based in Grado in the autonomous community of Asturias. Founded in 1961, it plays in the Tercera Federación – Group 2. Its stadium is Marqués de La Vega de Anzo with a capacity of 4,100 seats.

== History ==
The first CD Mosconia was founded in 1945 and dissolved in 1958. The current team was founded in 1961 under the name of Grado Club de Fútbol, used until 1970 when the club changed its denomination to the one used currently.

In 1991, Mosconia achieved its biggest success by promoting to Segunda División B after beating Real Madrid C, Bergantiños FC and Atlético Burgalés in the promotion play-offs. It only remained one season in the third tier.

In 2011 the club was relegated to Primera Regional, sixth tier, its worst result ever. After a serious financial trouble, the supporters helped the club to avoid the dissolution and to come back, years later, to Tercera División.

== Season to season ==
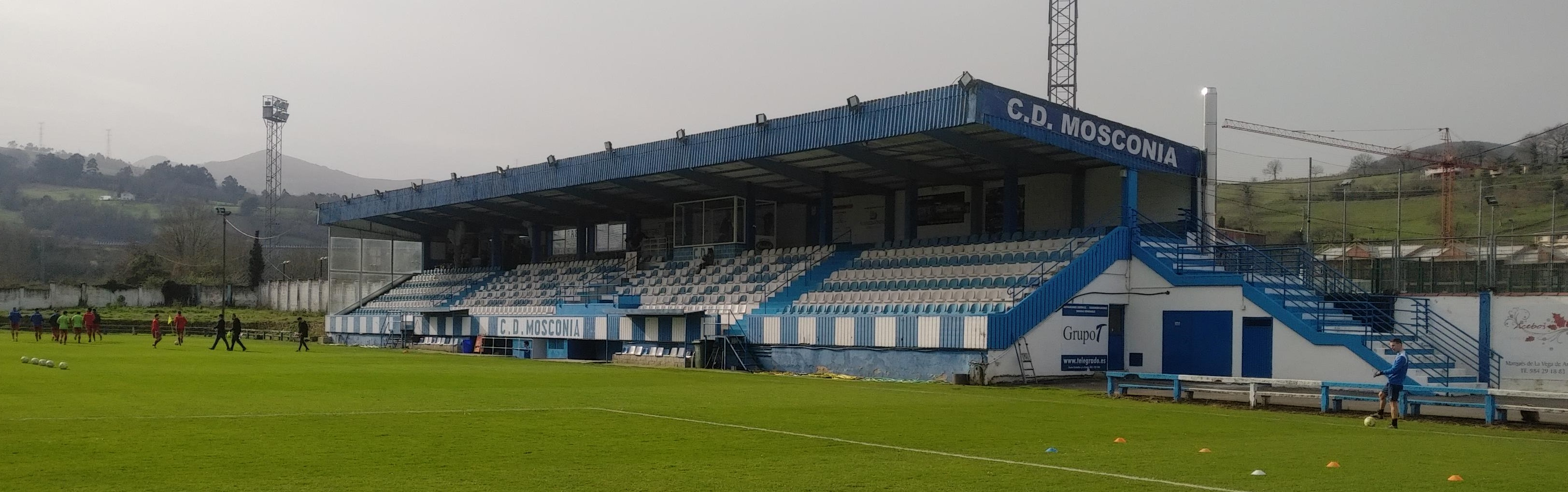
Marqués de la Vega de Anzo stadium.

Season	Tier	Division	Place	Copa del Rey
1946–47	5	2ª Reg.		
1947–48	4	1ª Reg.	4th	
1948–49	4	1ª Reg.	5th	
1949–50	4	1ª Reg.	9th	
1950–51	4	1ª Reg.	11th	
1951–52	4	1ª Reg.	7th	
1952–53	DNP			
1953–54	4	1ª Reg.	2nd	
1954–55	4	1ª Reg.	1st	
1955–56	4	1ª Reg.	5th	
1956–57	4	1ª Reg.	7th	
1957–58	4	1ª Reg.	9th	
1958–59	DNP			
1959–60	DNP			
1960–61	DNP			
1961–62	5	2ª Reg.	8th	
1962–63	5	2ª Reg.	1st	
1963–64	4	1ª Reg.	7th	
1964–65	4	1ª Reg.	5th	
1965–66	4	1ª Reg.	11th	

Season	Tier	Division	Place	Copa del Rey
1966–67	4	1ª Reg.	6th	
1967–68	4	1ª Reg.	4th	
1968–69	4	1ª Reg.	14th	
1969–70	4	1ª Reg.	15th	
1970–71	4	1ª Reg.	16th	
1971–72	4	1ª Reg.	5th	
1972–73	4	1ª Reg.	7th	
1973–74	4	Reg. Pref.	5th	
1974–75	4	Reg. Pref.	6th	
1975–76	4	Reg. Pref.	6th	
1976–77	4	Reg. Pref.	10th	
1977–78	5	Reg. Pref.	14th	
1978–79	5	Reg. Pref.	3rd	
1979–80	5	Reg. Pref.	11th	
1980–81	5	Reg. Pref.	10th	
1981–82	5	Reg. Pref.	15th	
1982–83	5	Reg. Pref.	1st	
1983–84	4	3ª	16th	
1984–85	4	3ª	13th	
1985–86	4	3ª	6th	

Season	Tier	Division	Place	Copa del Rey
1986–87	4	3ª	13th	First round
1987–88	4	3ª	16th	
1988–89	4	3ª	6th	
1989–90	4	3ª	3rd	
1990–91	4	3ª	3rd	Second round
1991–92	3	2ª B	20th	Second round
1992–93	4	3ª	18th	First round
1993–94	5	Reg. Pref.	4th	
1994–95	5	Reg. Pref.	1st	
1995–96	4	3ª	5th	
1996–97	4	3ª	19th	
1997–98	5	Reg. Pref.	1st	
1998–99	4	3ª	14th	
1999–2000	4	3ª	17th	
2000–01	4	3ª	12th	
2001–02	4	3ª	12th	
2002–03	4	3ª	14th	
2003–04	4	3ª	15th	
2004–05	4	3ª	3rd	
2005–06	4	3ª	10th	

Season	Tier	Division	Place	Copa del Rey
2006–07	4	3ª	19th	
2007–08	5	Reg. Pref.	1st	
2008–09	4	3ª	20th	
2009–10	5	Reg. Pref.	14th	
2010–11	5	Reg. Pref.	18th	
2011–12	6	1ª Reg.	3rd	
2012–13	5	Reg. Pref.	11th	
2013–14	5	Reg. Pref.	4th	
2014–15	4	3ª	11th	
2015–16	4	3ª	13th	
2016–17	4	3ª	12th	
2017–18	4	3ª	11th	
2018–19	4	3ª	9th	
2019–20	4	3ª	12th	
2020–21	4	3ª	9th / 2nd	
2021–22	5	3ª RFEF	20th	
2022–23	6	1ª RFFPA	14th	
2023–24	6	1ª Astur.	3rd	
2024–25	5	3ª Fed.	6th	
2025–26	5	3ª Fed.	5th	

Season	Tier	Division	Place	Copa del Rey
2026–27	5	3ª Fed.		

- 1 season in Segunda División B
- 28 seasons in Tercera División
- 4 seasons in Tercera Federación/Tercera División RFEF

== Notable former players ==
- (Spain) Alejandro Vázquez
- (Spain) Roberto Aguirre
