= 1992–93 Segunda División =

62nd season of the second-tier football league in Spain

Segunda División
- Season: 1992–93
- Champions: UE Lleida
- Promoted: UE Lleida; Real Valladolid; Racing de Santander
- Relegated: UE Figueres; CD Lugo; Sestao Sport Club; CE Sabadell FC
- Matches: 380
- Goals: 844 (2.22 per match)
- Top goalscorer: (Argentina) Daniel Aquino

The 1992–93 Segunda División season saw 20 teams participate in the second flight Spanish league. UE Lleida won the league.

UE Lleida, Real Valladolid and Racing de Santander were promoted to Primera División. UE Figueres, CD Lugo, Sestao and CE Sabadell FC were relegated to Segunda División B.

== Teams ==
Location of teams in Segunda División 1992-93

| Team | Home city | Stadium |
|---|---|---|
| Athletic Bilbao B | Bilbao | San Mamés |
| Badajoz | Badajoz | El Vivero |
| Barcelona B | Barcelona | Mini Estadi |
| Real Betis | Seville | Benito Villamarín |
| Castellón | Castellón de la Plana | Nou Castàlia |
| Compostela | Santiago de Compostela | Santa Isabel |
| Eibar | Eibar | Ipurua |
| Figueres | Figueres | Vilatenim |
| Lleida | Lleida | Camp d'Esports |
| Lugo | Lugo | Anxo Carro |
| Mallorca | Mallorca | Lluís Sitjar |
| Atlético Marbella | Marbella | Municipal de Marbella |
| Mérida | Mérida | Municipal de Mérida |
| Palamós | Palamós | Nou Municipal |
| Real Madrid B | Madrid | Ciudad Deportiva |
| Racing de Santander | Santander | El Sardinero |
| Sabadell | Sabadell | Nova Creu Alta |
| Sestao Sport | Sestao | Las Llanas |
| Valladolid | Valladolid | José Zorrilla |
| Villarreal | Villarreal | El Madrigal |

== Final table ==
| Pos | Team | Pld | W | D | L | GF | GA | GD | Pts | Promotion or relegation |
|---|---|---|---|---|---|---|---|---|---|---|
| 1 | UE Lleida | 38 | 23 | 11 | 4 | 56 | 20 | +36 | 57 | Promoted to Primera División |
| 2 | Real Valladolid | 38 | 20 | 12 | 6 | 50 | 30 | +20 | 52 | Promoted to Primera División |
| 3 | Racing de Santander | 38 | 23 | 6 | 9 | 56 | 38 | +18 | 52 | Promotion playoff |
| 4 | RCD Mallorca | 38 | 21 | 8 | 9 | 57 | 34 | +23 | 50 | Promotion playoff |
| 5 | Real Betis | 38 | 16 | 11 | 11 | 49 | 33 | +16 | 43 | |
| 6 | Real Madrid B | 38 | 15 | 12 | 11 | 57 | 41 | +16 | 42 | |
| 7 | Atlético Marbella | 38 | 17 | 8 | 13 | 45 | 41 | +4 | 42 | |
| 8 | Barcelona B | 38 | 15 | 9 | 14 | 59 | 55 | +4 | 39 | |
| 9 | CP Mérida | 38 | 13 | 13 | 12 | 43 | 42 | +1 | 39 | |
| 10 | CD Castellón | 38 | 13 | 10 | 15 | 40 | 45 | −5 | 36 | |
| 11 | CD Badajoz | 38 | 14 | 8 | 16 | 37 | 36 | +1 | 36 | |
| 12 | SD Compostela | 38 | 10 | 15 | 13 | 35 | 39 | −4 | 35 | |
| 13 | Villarreal CF | 38 | 13 | 8 | 17 | 38 | 51 | −13 | 34 | |
| 14 | Palamós CF | 38 | 12 | 9 | 17 | 33 | 50 | −17 | 33 | |
| 15 | Athletic de Bilbao B | 38 | 9 | 15 | 14 | 33 | 34 | −1 | 33 | |
| 16 | SD Eibar | 38 | 10 | 12 | 16 | 33 | 44 | −11 | 32 | |
| 17 | UE Figueres | 38 | 11 | 10 | 17 | 41 | 59 | −18 | 32 | Relegated to Segunda División B |
| 18 | CD Lugo | 38 | 7 | 11 | 20 | 23 | 41 | −18 | 25 | Relegated to Segunda División B |
| 19 | Sestao | 38 | 7 | 10 | 21 | 29 | 54 | −25 | 24 | Relegated to Segunda División B |
| 20 | CE Sabadell FC (Note: CE Sabadell FC was relegated to Tercera División for not paying its players.) | 38 | 8 | 8 | 22 | 30 | 57 | −27 | 24 | Relegated to Segunda División B |

Source: BDFútbol

== Results ==
| Home \ Away | ATH | BAD | BAR | BET | CAS | COM | EIB | FIG | LLE | LUG | MLL | MAR | MÉR | PAL | RAC | RMA | SAB | SES | VLL | VIL |
|---|---|---|---|---|---|---|---|---|---|---|---|---|---|---|---|---|---|---|---|---|
| Athletic B | — | 0–1 | 1–1 | 0–0 | 2–0 | 2–2 | 4–0 | 1–0 | 0–0 | 3–1 | 3–0 | 0–1 | 1–3 | 0–0 | 1–1 | 0–1 | 0–0 | 0–0 | 0–0 | 2–2 |
| Badajoz | 0–1 | — | 0–1 | 2–0 | 1–1 | 1–0 | 2–0 | 7–1 | 1–2 | 0–1 | 2–2 | 1–1 | 1–0 | 0–0 | 1–1 | 1–2 | 0–2 | 2–1 | 0–1 | 0–0 |
| Barcelona B | 1–3 | 1–2 | — | 2–2 | 2–0 | 0–2 | 0–0 | 1–1 | 1–1 | 1–0 | 1–2 | 1–0 | 1–1 | 6–1 | 2–1 | 2–2 | 3–0 | 2–1 | 1–1 | 8–1 |
| Betis | 1–1 | 2–0 | 0–2 | — | 1–1 | 3–0 | 0–1 | 0–1 | 0–0 | 1–0 | 1–2 | 2–1 | 2–2 | 2–2 | 1–0 | 1–0 | 2–0 | 4–0 | 2–2 | 2–0 |
| Castellón | 2–1 | 2–1 | 0–2 | 0–2 | — | 1–0 | 2–0 | 4–1 | 0–2 | 2–0 | 2–1 | 1–1 | 0–1 | 3–0 | 0–0 | 1–0 | 4–0 | 1–1 | 1–2 | 0–1 |
| Compostela | 1–1 | 1–1 | 4–1 | 2–1 | 0–0 | — | 1–3 | 1–0 | 0–3 | 0–0 | 0–2 | 0–0 | 0–0 | 2–0 | 0–1 | 0–3 | 2–0 | 2–0 | 3–0 | 1–1 |
| Eibar | 0–0 | 2–0 | 2–2 | 2–1 | 0–2 | 1–1 | — | 2–2 | 1–0 | 2–1 | 0–1 | 0–1 | 1–2 | 2–1 | 0–1 | 2–1 | 0–0 | 0–1 | 1–2 | 4–2 |
| Figueres | 0–0 | 1–3 | 2–1 | 0–3 | 2–0 | 2–2 | 1–1 | — | 0–0 | 1–0 | 1–1 | 4–1 | 2–1 | 2–0 | 1–2 | 1–2 | 3–0 | 1–2 | 1–0 | 0–1 |
| Lleida | 1–0 | 3–0 | 1–0 | 1–0 | 2–1 | 1–0 | 3–1 | 1–1 | — | 4–0 | 2–2 | 1–0 | 1–1 | 3–0 | 3–0 | 0–2 | 3–0 | 1–0 | 1–2 | 1–0 |
| Lugo | 1–0 | 0–2 | 0–2 | 0–0 | 0–1 | 1–1 | 0–0 | 2–0 | 0–0 | — | 1–1 | 1–0 | 0–0 | 2–3 | 3–0 | 1–2 | 2–0 | 0–0 | 0–0 | 0–0 |
| Mallorca | 1–0 | 1–0 | 4–0 | 1–1 | 3–1 | 2–0 | 1–0 | 4–0 | 0–2 | 2–0 | — | 2–0 | 1–0 | 2–1 | 2–0 | 1–1 | 3–1 | 3–1 | 0–0 | 0–1 |
| Marbella | 1–0 | 1–0 | 3–1 | 1–3 | 1–1 | 2–1 | 0–0 | 2–1 | 1–1 | 2–1 | 1–0 | — | 2–1 | 2–0 | 1–3 | 0–3 | 4–1 | 3–0 | 4–1 | 2–0 |
| Mérida | 0–2 | 1–0 | 1–3 | 0–0 | 5–3 | 0–0 | 2–1 | 1–1 | 0–2 | 1–0 | 0–0 | 3–0 | — | 1–0 | 2–3 | 1–1 | 1–0 | 0–0 | 0–0 | 2–1 |
| Palamós | 2–0 | 0–1 | 0–2 | 2–2 | 0–0 | 1–0 | 0–1 | 1–0 | 0–0 | 1–0 | 1–3 | 2–2 | 1–0 | — | 1–2 | 3–2 | 1–0 | 1–0 | 1–2 | 1–0 |
| Racing | 0–1 | 2–0 | 3–2 | 1–0 | 5–1 | 2–0 | 2–0 | 3–1 | 0–2 | 3–2 | 1–0 | 1–0 | 3–1 | 0–0 | — | 3–1 | 1–0 | 1–0 | 2–1 | 3–1 |
| R. Madrid B | 1–1 | 0–1 | 2–1 | 0–2 | 3–0 | 2–2 | 1–1 | 2–3 | 0–1 | 1–0 | 4–1 | 2–0 | 2–2 | 1–1 | 0–0 | — | 2–2 | 3–0 | 1–1 | 1–0 |
| Sabadell | 1–0 | 1–1 | 4–0 | 1–3 | 0–1 | 0–1 | 0–0 | 1–1 | 2–0 | 1–0 | 3–2 | 0–0 | 0–3 | 1–2 | 3–4 | 2–1 | — | 1–2 | 0–0 | 2–0 |
| Sestao Sport | 2–0 | 0–1 | 0–1 | 0–2 | 0–0 | 0–0 | 2–2 | 3–1 | 2–2 | 1–2 | 0–1 | 1–2 | 1–2 | 3–1 | 0–0 | 0–4 | 2–1 | — | 1–2 | 1–3 |
| Valladolid | 4–1 | 1–0 | 3–0 | 2–0 | 1–0 | 1–1 | 1–0 | 3–0 | 0–1 | 0–0 | 2–1 | 1–0 | 4–1 | 2–1 | 2–1 | 3–1 | 1–0 | 1–1 | — | 0–0 |
| Villarreal | 2–1 | 0–1 | 4–1 | 1–2 | 1–1 | 0–2 | 1–0 | 0–1 | 2–4 | 3–1 | 0–2 | 0–2 | 2–1 | 1–1 | 2–0 | 0–0 | 2–0 | 1–0 | 2–1 | — |

Source: BDFutbol
Legend: Blue = home team win; Yellow = draw; Red = away team win.

== Promotion playoff ==
| Team 1 | Agg. | Team 2 | 1st leg | 2nd leg |
|---|---|---|---|---|
| RCD Español | 0–1 | Racing de Santander | 0–1 | 0–0 |
| RCD Mallorca | 3–4 | Albacete Balompié | 1–3 | 2–1 |

=== First leg ===
| 23 June 1993 | RCD Español | 0–1 | Racing de Santander | Barcelona |
| 20:30 | | Report (in Spanish) | Pineda 48' | Stadium: Sarrià; Attendance: 15,000; Referee: Manuel Díaz Vega (Asturias) |

| 23 June 1993 | RCD Mallorca | 1–3 | Albacete Balompié | Palma de Mallorca |
| 21:30 | Milojević 61' | Report (in Spanish) | Menéndez 28'; Pinilla 44'; Antonio 59' | Stadium: Lluís Sitjar; Attendance: 28,000; Referee: José María García-Aranda (Community of Madrid) |

=== Second leg ===
| 29 June 1993 | Racing de Santander | 0–0 (1–0 agg.) | RCD Español | Santander |
| 21:15 | | Report (in Spanish) | | Stadium: El Sardinero; Attendance: 33,000; Referee: Antonio Jesús López Nieto (Andalusia) |

| 30 June 1993 | Albacete Balompié | 1–2 (4–3 agg.) | RCD Mallorca | Albacete |
| 21:15 | Antonio 45' | Report (in Spanish) | Luis Delgado 14'; Bogdanović 21' | Stadium: Carlos Belmonte; Attendance: 17,000; Referee: Juan Manuel Brito Arceo (Canary Islands) |
