= Manolo Sánchez (footballer, born 1969) =

Spanish footballer

Personal information
- Full name: Manuel Sánchez Ramírez
- Date of birth: 12 December 1969 (age 56)
- Place of birth: Sabadell, Spain
- Height: 1.77 m (5 ft 9 1/2 in)
- Position: Defender

Youth career
- Mercantil

Senior career*
Years	Team	Apps	(Gls)
1988–1990	Peña Merengues		
1990–1991	Sabadell B		
1991–1993	Sabadell	40	(0)
1993–1995	Figueres	57	(0)
1995–1997	Murcia		
1997–2000	Lorca		
2000–2004	Ciudad Murcia	55	(0)
2004	Mazarrón		
2004–2005	Villarrobledo	33	(2)

Managerial career
- 2005–2008: La Unión
- 2008–2009: Águilas
- 2010: Moratalla
- 2010–2011: Jumilla
- 2011–2012: Tenerife (assistant)
- 2012: UCAM Murcia
- * Club domestic league appearances and goals

Manuel "Manolo" Sánchez Ramírez (born 12 December 1969) is a Spanish former footballer who played as a defender, and a current manager.

== Club career ==
Born in Sabadell, Barcelona, Catalonia, Sánchez started his senior career with Peña Los Merengues FC after graduating from CE Mercantil's youth setup. In 1990 he moved to CE Sabadell FC, being initially assigned to the reserves in the regional leagues.

Sánchez made his first team debut on 14 April 1991, starting in a 1–1 Segunda División home draw against Sestao River. After four matches, he was definitely promoted to the main squad the following campaign.

Sánchez subsequently spent the remainder of his career in Segunda División B and Tercera División, representing UE Figueres, Real Murcia, Lorca CF, Ciudad de Murcia (with the half of the 2004–05 campaign in the second tier), Mazarrón CF and CP Villarrobledo. He retired with the latter in 2005, after contributing with two goals in 33 matches.

== Manager career ==
Immediately after retiring, Sánchez started his managerial career with fourth tier club CD La Unión. On 5 December 2008 he was named Águilas CF manager in the third level, and managed to finish tenth in the season.

On 30 January 2010, Sánchez was appointed at the helm of Moratalla CF. On 14 December, after suffering team relegation, he was presented at Jumilla CF.

On 24 January 2011 Sánchez was relieved from his duties, and subsequently went on to work as Antonio Calderón's assistant at CD Tenerife. On 2 October of the following year he was appointed UCAM Murcia CF manager, but was sacked on 6 December.
