= CA Marbella =

Spanish football team

Atlético Marbella
- Full name: Club Atlético Marbella
- Nickname(s): Blancos
- Founded: 1947
- Dissolved: 1997
- Ground: Estadio Municipal, Marbella, Andalusia, Spain
- Capacity: 9,000
- League: 2ªB – Group 4
- 1996–97: 2ªB – Group 4, 20th
Home colours	Away colours

Club Atlético Marbella were a Spanish football team based in Marbella, in the autonomous community of Andalusia. Founded in 1947 and dissolved in 1997, it served as the reserve team of CD Málaga in the past.

== History ==
Atlético Marbella had its heyday in the mid-1990s, with four consecutive appearances in the second division, having spent the vast majority of its early existence in the third (after Segunda División B was created in 1977, it became the fourth level) and the regional leagues.

Until 1995 the club was owned by Jesús Gil, a controversial businessman and also mayor of Marbella, as well as the chairman of Atlético Madrid. Subsequently, he sold it to Slobodan "Boban" Petrović, an entrepreneur from Serbia.

Finally, in 1997, CA Marbella disappeared, due to the many debts contracted in previous seasons.

=== Club background ===
- CA Marbella: 1947–1997
- UD Marbella: 1997–2013
- Marbella FC: 2013–present

== Season to season ==
Season	Tier	Division	Place	Copa del Rey
1959–60	4	1ª Reg.	2nd	
1960–61	4	1ª Reg.	3rd	
1961–62	4	1ª Reg.		
1962–63	4	1ª Reg.	1st	
1963–64	3	3ª	6th	
1964–65	3	3ª	3rd	
1965–66	3	3ª	2nd	
1966–67	3	3ª	4th	
1967–68	3	3ª	6th	
1968–69	3	3ª	6th	
1969–70	3	3ª	13th	First round
1970–71	4	1ª Reg.	5th	
1971–72	4	1ª Reg.	3rd	
1972–73	4	1ª Reg.	1st	
1973–74	3	3ª	13th	First round
1974–75	3	3ª	2nd	Second round
1975–76	3	3ª	12th	Second round
1976–77	4	Reg. Pref.	10th	
1977–78	4	3ª	18th	Third round

Season	Tier	Division	Place	Copa del Rey
1978–79	5	Reg. Pref.	11th	
1979–80	5	Reg. Pref.	14th	
1980–81	4	3ª	16th	
1981–82	4	3ª	9th	
1982–83	4	3ª	2nd	
1983–84	4	3ª	2nd	Second round
1984–85	3	2ª B	18th	First round
1985–86	4	3ª	2nd	
1986–87	4	3ª	2nd	Fourth round
1987–88	3	2ª B	9th	Second round
1988–89	3	2ª B	6th	First round
1989–90	3	2ª B	17th	
1990–91	4	3ª	1st	Third round
1991–92	3	2ª B	1st	Fourth round
1992–93	2	2ª	7th	Fourth round
1993–94	2	2ª	12th	Third round
1994–95	2	2ª	13th	Second round
1995–96	2	2ª	20th	Second round
1996–97	3	2ª B	20th	First round

- 4 seasons in Segunda División
- 6 seasons in Segunda División B
- 18 seasons in Tercera División
