= 1998 Tercera División play-offs =

Spanish football league play-offs

The 1998 Spanish Soccer Tercera División play-offs to Segunda División B from Tercera División (Promotion play-offs) were the final playoffs for the promotion from 1997–98 Tercera División to 1998–99 Segunda División B. The first four teams in each group (excluding reserve teams) took part in the play-off.

== Format ==
The 68 participating soccer teams were divided into 5 series each made up of 4 groups in the category, with the exception of Series E , which was only formed by Group XII . Each series was divided into 4 groups formed by a 1st, a 2nd, a 3rd and a 4th classified from each group, which played a double-round playoff. Each victory was equivalent to 3 points, the tie to 1 point and the defeat to 0 points. The champion of each group obtained the promotion to Second Division B.

The distribution of each series was as follows:

Series A:

- Group I – Galicia (Galicia (Spain))
- Group II – Asturias
- Group VII – Community of Madrid
- Group VIII – Castile and León

Series B:

- Group III – Cantabria
- Group IV – Basque Country (Basque Country (autonomous community))
- Group XV – La Rioja and Navarre
- Group XVI – Aragon

Series C:

- Group V – Catalonia
- Group VI – Valencian Community
- Group XI – Balearic Islands
- Gruoup XIII – Region of Murcia

Series D:

- Group IX – Eastern Andalusia and Melilla
- Group X – Western Andalusia and Ceuta
- Group XIV – Extremadura
- Group XVII – Castilla–La Mancha

Series E:

- Group XII – Canary Islands

== Teams for 1997–98 play-offs ==
Group I – Galicia (Galicia (Spain))	Group II – Asturias	Group III – Cantabria	Group IV – Basque Country (Basque Country (autonomous community))	Group V – Catalonia
1st SD Compostela B	1st CD Lealtad	1st CD Tropezón	1st CD Basconia	1st FC Barcelona C
2nd CD Lalín	2nd AD Universidad de Oviedo	2nd SD Noja	2nd Zalla UC	2nd Palamós CF
3rd RC Celta de Vigo B	3rd Navia CF	3rd UM Escobedo	3rd Real Sociedad B	3rd CE Mataró
4th Betanzos CF	4th Club Siero	4th Castro FC	4th SD Amorebieta	4th CD Tortosa

Group VI – Valencian Community	Group VII – Community of Madrid	Group VIII – Castile and León	Group IX – E. Andalusia and Melilla	Group X – W. Andalusia and Ceuta
1st CD Eldense	1st Aranjuez CF	1st CF Palencia Cristo Olímpico	1st CD Linares	1st AD Ceuta
2nd Benidorm CD	2nd CD Móstoles	2nd SD Gimnástica Segoviana	2nd CP Ejido	2nd CD San Fernando
3rd Pinoso CF	3rd Real Madrid C	3rd SD Ponferradina	3rd CP Granada 74	3rd CD San Roque de Lepe
4th CD Olímpic de Xàtiva	4th UD San Sebastián de los Reyes	4th UD Salamanca B	4th Vélez CF	4th Algeciras CF

Group XI – Balearic Islands	Group XII – Canary Islands	Group XIII – Region of Murcia	Group XIV – Extremadura	Group XV – Navarre and La Rioja
1st CD Atlético Baleares	1st Universidad LPGC CF	1st Cartagonova CF	1st Jerez CF	1st CD Calahorra
2nd CD Constancia	2nd CD Corralejo	2nd Águilas CF	2nd Mérida Promesas UD	2nd Peña Sport FC
3rd CF Sporting Mahonés	3rd UD Las Palmas B	3rd Sangonera Atlético CF	3rd SP Villafranca	3rd CD Logroñés B
4th CF Villafranca	4th UD Lanzarote	4th Caravaca CF	4th CD Badajoz B	4th CD Azcoyen

Group XVI – Aragon	Group XVII – Castilla–La Mancha
1st CD Binéfar	1st Hellín Deportivo
2nd UD Fraga	2nd UB Conquense
3rd CF Figueruelas	3rd Puertollano Industrial CF
4th UD Casetas	4th CD Guadalajara

== Tables and Results ==
=== Group A-1 ===
Pos	Team	Pld	W	D	L	GF	GA	GD	Pts	Qualification or relegation
1	(Community of Madrid) CD Móstoles (substituted on)	6	3	3	0	13	6	+7	12	Promoted to Segunda División B
2	(Asturias) Club Siero	6	1	5	0	5	4	+1	8	
3	(Galicia (Spain)) RC Celta de Vigo B	6	1	3	2	8	11	−3	6	
4	(Castile and León) CF Palencia Cristo Olímpico	6	1	1	4	10	15	−5	4	

Source: Fútbol Regional

Home \ Away	CEL	MÓS	PCO	SIE
RC Celta de Vigo B	—	0–3	3–1	0–0
CD Móstoles	1–1	—	5–2	1–1
CF Palencia Cristo Olímpico	4–2	2–3	—	1–1
Club Siero	2–2	0–0	1–0	—

Updated to match(es) played on completed. Source: FutbolMe
Legend: Blue = home team win; Yellow = draw; Red = away team win.

=== Group A-2 ===
Pos	Team	Pld	W	D	L	GF	GA	GD	Pts	Qualification or relegation
1	(Community of Madrid) UD San Sebastián de los Reyes (substituted on)	6	3	1	2	12	12	0	10	Promoted to Segunda División B
2	(Castile and León) SD Ponferradina	6	3	1	2	9	8	+1	10	
3	(Galicia (Spain)) SD Compostela B	6	3	1	2	12	7	+5	10	
4	(Asturias) AD Universidad de Oviedo	6	1	1	4	8	14	−6	4	

Source: Fútbol Regional

Home \ Away	COM	PON	SAS	UNI
SD Compostela B	—	0–1	1–1	4–0
SD Ponferradina	1–2	—	2–4	2–1
UD San Sebast. Reyes	3–2	0–2	—	4–2
CD Uni. Oviedo	1–3	1–1	3–0	—

Updated to match(es) played on completed. Source: FutbolMe
Legend: Blue = home team win; Yellow = draw; Red = away team win.

=== Group A-3 ===
Pos	Team	Pld	W	D	L	GF	GA	GD	Pts	Qualification or relegation
1	(Galicia (Spain)) CD Lalín (substituted on)	6	3	2	1	7	4	+3	11	Promoted to Segunda División B
2	(Community of Madrid) Aranjuez CF	6	3	2	1	7	4	+3	11	
3	(Castile and León) UD Salamanca B	6	3	1	2	10	5	+5	10	
4	(Asturias) Navia CF	6	0	1	5	3	14	−11	1	

Source: Fútbol Regional

Home \ Away	ARN	LAL	NAV	SAL
Aranjuez CF	—	1–1	3–1	0–0
CD Lalín	2–0	—	1–0	2–0
Navia CF	0–1	1–1	—	1–3
UD Salamanca B	0–2	2–0	5–0	—

Updated to match(es) played on completed. Source: FutbolMe
Legend: Blue = home team win; Yellow = draw; Red = away team win.

=== Group A-4 ===
Pos	Team	Pld	W	D	L	GF	GA	GD	Pts	Qualification or relegation
1	(Asturias) CD Lealtad (substituted on)	6	4	0	2	8	11	−3	12	Promoted to Segunda División B
2	(Castile and León) SD Gimnástica Segoviana	6	3	1	2	8	4	+4	10	
3	(Galicia (Spain)) Betanzos CF	6	3	0	3	11	10	+1	9	
4	(Community of Madrid) Real Madrid C	6	1	1	4	5	7	−2	4	

Source: Fútbol Regional

Home \ Away	BET	GSV	LEA	RMC
Betanzos CF	—	2–1	7–1	2–1
SD Gim. Segoviana	1–0	—	4–0	2–1
CD Lealtad	3–0	1–0	—	1–0
Real Madrid C	3–0	0–0	0–2	—

Updated to match(es) played on completed. Source: FutbolMe
Legend: Blue = home team win; Yellow = draw; Red = away team win.

=== Group B-1 ===
Pos	Team	Pld	W	D	L	GF	GA	GD	Pts	Qualification or relegation
1	(Aragon) CD Binéfar (substituted on)	6	4	1	1	12	5	+7	13	Promoted to Segunda División B
2	(Basque Country (autonomous community)) Real Sociedad B	6	4	1	1	16	7	+9	13	
3	(Navarre) Peña Sport FC	6	3	0	3	16	8	+8	9	
4	(Cantabria) Castro FC	6	0	0	6	2	26	−24	0	

Source: Fútbol Regional

Home \ Away	BIN	CAS	PEÑ	RSO
CD Binéfar	—	3–0	2–0	1–0
Castro FC	0–4	—	0–3	0–4
Peña Sport FC	3–0	7–1	—	2–3
Real Sociedad B	2–2	5–1	2–1	—

Updated to match(es) played on completed. Source: FutbolMe
Legend: Blue = home team win; Yellow = draw; Red = away team win.

=== Group B-2 ===
Pos	Team	Pld	W	D	L	GF	GA	GD	Pts	Qualification or relegation
1	(Cantabria) CD Tropezón (substituted on)	6	3	3	0	9	6	+3	12	Promoted to Segunda División B
2	(Aragon) UD Fraga	6	2	3	1	8	7	+1	9	
3	(La Rioja) CD Logroñés	6	1	3	2	9	6	+3	6	
4	(Basque Country (autonomous community)) SD Amorebieta	6	0	3	3	4	11	−7	3	

Source: Fútbol Regional

Home \ Away	AMO	FRA	LOG	TRO
SD Amorebieta	—	1–1	0–0	1–1
UD Fraga	1–0	—	2–1	1–2
CD Logroñés B	5–0	2–2	—	1–2
CD Tropezón	3–2	1–1	0–0	—

Updated to match(es) played on completed. Source: FutbolMe
Legend: Blue = home team win; Yellow = draw; Red = away team win.

=== Group B-3 ===
Pos	Team	Pld	W	D	L	GF	GA	GD	Pts	Qualification or relegation
1	(Basque Country (autonomous community)) CD Basconia (Note: CD Basconia remained at Tercera División, because Athletic Bilbao B remained at Segunda División B, Basconia is the Athletic Bilbao's third reserve team.)	6	5	1	0	12	6	+6	16	
2	(Cantabria) SD Noja (substituted on)	6	2	3	1	8	6	+2	9	Promoted to Segunda División B
3	(Navarre) CD Azcoyen	6	2	2	2	9	6	+3	8	
4	(Aragon) CF Figueruelas	6	0	0	6	3	14	−11	0	

Source: Fútbol Regional
Notes:

Home \ Away	AZC	BAS	FIG	NOJ
CD Azcoyen	—	0–1	0–1	1–1
CD Basconia	3–2	—	2–1	1–2
CF Figueruelas	0–1	1–3	—	1–2
SD Noja	1–1	1–1	2–0	—

Updated to match(es) played on completed. Source: FutbolMe
Legend: Blue = home team win; Yellow = draw; Red = away team win.

=== Group B-4 ===
Pos	Team	Pld	W	D	L	GF	GA	GD	Pts	Qualification or relegation
1	(La Rioja) CD Calahorra (substituted on)	6	4	2	0	11	4	+7	14	Promoted to Segunda División B
2	(Basque Country (autonomous community)) Zalla UC	6	3	2	1	9	4	+5	11	
3	(Aragon) UD Casetas	6	2	2	2	8	8	0	8	
4	(Cantabria) UM Escobedo	6	0	0	6	2	14	−12	0	

Source: Fútbol Regional

Home \ Away	CAL	CST	ESC	ZAL
CD Calahorra	—	2–2	4–1	1–0
UD Casetas	0–2	—	4–0	1–1
UM Escobedo	0–1	0–1	—	1–2
Zalla UC	1–1	3–0	2–0	—

Updated to match(es) played on completed. Source: FutbolMe
Legend: Blue = home team win; Yellow = draw; Red = away team win.

=== Group C-1 ===
Pos	Team	Pld	W	D	L	GF	GA	GD	Pts	Qualification or relegation
1	(Region of Murcia) Cartagonova CF	6	3	2	1	15	3	+12	11	Promoted to Segunda División B
2	(Valencian Community) Pinoso CF	6	2	2	2	6	4	+2	8	
3	(Catalonia) CD Tortosa	6	2	1	3	6	13	−7	7	
4	(Balearic Islands) CD Constancia	6	2	1	3	5	12	−7	7	

Source: Fútbol Regional

Home \ Away	CGN	CON	PIN	TOR
Cartagonova CF	—	6–0	0–0	8–0
CD Constancia	0–1	—	2–1	1–1
Pinoso CF	0–0	1–2	—	3–0
CD Tortosa	3–0	2–0	0–1	—

Updated to match(es) played on completed. Source: FutbolMe
Legend: Blue = home team win; Yellow = draw; Red = away team win.

=== Group C-2 ===
Pos	Team	Pld	W	D	L	GF	GA	GD	Pts	Qualification or relegation
1	(Region of Murcia) Águilas CF (substituted on)	6	4	2	0	12	3	+9	14	Promoted to Segunda División B
2	(Catalonia) FC Barcelona C	6	3	2	1	12	4	+8	11	
3	(Valencian Community) CD Olímpic de Xàtiva	6	0	4	2	6	15	−9	4	
4	(Balearic Islands) CF Sporting Mahonés	6	0	2	4	4	12	−8	2	

Source: Fútbol Regional

Home \ Away	AGU	BAR	OLI	SMH
Águilas CF	—	1–0	4–1	3–0
FC Barcelona C	1–1	—	6–0	1–0
CD Olímpic de Xàtiva	1–1	1–1	—	2–2
CF Sporting Mahonés	0–2	1–3	1–1	—

Updated to match(es) played on completed. Source: FutbolMe
Legend: Blue = home team win; Yellow = draw; Red = away team win.

=== Group C-3 ===
Pos	Team	Pld	W	D	L	GF	GA	GD	Pts	Qualification or relegation
1	(Catalonia) Palamós CF (substituted on)	6	3	2	1	12	6	+6	11	Promoted to Segunda División B
2	(Region of Murcia) Sangonera Atlético CF	6	3	1	2	16	9	+7	10	
3	(Valencian Community) CD Eldense	6	1	3	2	6	11	−5	6	
4	(Balearic Islands) CF Villafranca	6	1	2	3	8	16	−8	5	

Source: Fútbol Regional

Home \ Away	ELD	PAL	SAN	VFR
CD Eldense	—	0–4	0–2	2–1
Palamós CF	0–0	—	3–4	1–1
Sangonera Atlético CF	1–1	1–2	—	2–3
CF Villafranca	3–3	0–2	0–6	—

Updated to match(es) played on completed. Source: FutbolMe
Legend: Blue = home team win; Yellow = draw; Red = away team win.

=== Group C-4 ===
Pos	Team	Pld	W	D	L	GF	GA	GD	Pts	Qualification or relegation
1	(Valencian Community) Benidorm CD (substituted on)	6	5	0	1	7	4	+3	15	Promoted to Segunda División B
2	(Catalonia) CE Mataró	6	4	1	1	13	3	+10	13	
3	(Balearic Islands) CD Atlético Baleares	6	1	1	4	3	5	−2	4	
4	(Region of Murcia) Caravaca CF	6	0	2	4	2	13	−11	2	

Source: Fútbol Regional

Home \ Away	BAL	BEN	CRV	MAT
CD Atlético Baleares	—	1–1	2–0	0–1
Benidorm CD	1–0	—	1–0	1–0
Caravaca CF	0–0	1–3	—	1–1
CE Mataró	2–1	3–0	6–0	—

Updated to match(es) played on completed. Source: FutbolMe
Legend: Blue = home team win; Yellow = draw; Red = away team win.

=== Group D-1 ===
Pos	Team	Pld	W	D	L	GF	GA	GD	Pts	Qualification or relegation
1	(Castilla–La Mancha) UB Conquense (substituted on)	6	3	3	0	7	4	+3	12	Promoted to Segunda División B
2	(Andalusia) CD Linares	6	3	2	1	6	3	+3	11	
3	(Andalusia) CD San Roque de Lepe	6	2	0	4	4	6	−2	6	
4	(Extremadura) CD Badajoz B	6	1	1	4	3	7	−4	4	

Source: Fútbol Regional

Home \ Away	BAD	COQ	LIN	SRL
CD Badajoz B	—	2–2	0–2	1–0
UB Conquense	1–0	—	1–1	1–0
CD Linares	1–0	0–0	—	1–0
CD San Roque de Lepe	1–0	1–2	2–1	—

Updated to match(es) played on completed. Source: FutbolMe
Legend: Blue = home team win; Yellow = draw; Red = away team win.

=== Group D-2 ===
Pos	Team	Pld	W	D	L	GF	GA	GD	Pts	Qualification or relegation
1	AD Ceuta (substituted on)	6	5	1	0	10	2	+8	16	Promoted to Segunda División B
2	(Castilla–La Mancha) CD Guadalajara	6	2	2	2	8	9	−1	8	
3	(Andalusia) CP Ejido	6	1	3	2	6	7	−1	6	
4	(Extremadura) SP Villafranca	6	0	2	4	4	10	−6	2	

Source: Fútbol Regional

Home \ Away	CEU	EJI	GUA	VLF
AD Ceuta	—	3–1	1–0	2–1
CP Ejido	0–0	—	1–2	0–0
CD Guadalajara	0–2	2–2	—	1–1
SP Villafranca	0–2	0–2	2–3	—

Updated to match(es) played on completed. Source: FutbolMe
Legend: Blue = home team win; Yellow = draw; Red = away team win.

=== Group D-3 ===
Pos	Team	Pld	W	D	L	GF	GA	GD	Pts	Qualification or relegation
1	(Andalusia) Algeciras CF (substituted on)	6	3	2	1	9	5	+4	11	Promoted to Segunda División B
2	(Castilla–La Mancha) Hellín Deportivo	6	2	4	0	7	4	+3	10	
3	(Extremadura) UD Mérida Promesas	6	2	2	2	5	5	0	8	
4	(Andalusia) CP Granada 74	6	0	2	4	4	11	−7	2	

Source: Fútbol Regional

Home \ Away	ALG	G74	HEL	MEP
Algeciras CF	—	4–0	1–1	0–0
CP Granada 74	0–1	—	2–2	1–2
Hellín Deportivo	3–1	0–0	—	0–0
UD Mérida Promesas	1–2	2–1	0–1	—

Updated to match(es) played on completed. Source: FutbolMe
Legend: Blue = home team win; Yellow = draw; Red = away team win.

=== Group D-4 ===
Pos	Team	Pld	W	D	L	GF	GA	GD	Pts	Qualification or relegation
1	(Extremadura) Jerez CF (substituted on)	6	4	2	0	13	2	+11	14	Promoted to Segunda División B
2	(Andalusia) CD San Fernando	6	4	1	1	12	4	+8	13	
3	(Andalusia) Vélez CF	6	1	2	3	4	11	−7	5	
4	(Castilla–La Mancha) Puertollano Industrial CF	6	0	1	5	1	13	−12	1	

Source: Fútbol Regional

Home \ Away	JER	PUI	SFE	VEL
Jerez CF	—	3–0	2–0	6–1
Puertollano Industrial CF	0–1	—	1–4	0–0
CD San Fernando	0–0	4–0	—	2–0
Vélez CF	1–1	1–0	1–2	—

Updated to match(es) played on completed. Source: FutbolMe
Legend: Blue = home team win; Yellow = draw; Red = away team win.

=== Group E ===
Pos	Team	Pld	W	D	L	GF	GA	GD	Pts	Qualification or relegation
1	(Canary Islands) Universidad LPGC CF (substituted on)	6	4	1	1	7	3	+4	13	Promoted to Segunda División B
2	(Canary Islands) UD Las Palmas B	6	3	0	3	8	6	+2	9	
3	(Canary Islands) CD Corralejo	6	2	2	2	6	6	0	8	
4	(Canary Islands) UD Lanzarote	6	0	3	3	4	10	−6	3	

Source: Fútbol Regional

Home \ Away	CLJ	LAN	LPA	ULP
CD Corralejo	—	0–0	1–0	1–2
UD Lanzarote	2–2	—	1–3	1–1
UD Las Palmas B	2–1	3–0	—	0–1
Universidad LPGC CF	0–1	1–0	2–0	—

Updated to match(es) played on completed. Source: FutbolMe
Legend: Blue = home team win; Yellow = draw; Red = away team win.

== Teams Promoted ==
Group I – Galicia (Galicia (Spain))

- CD Lalín

Group II – Asturias

- CD Lealtad

Group III – Cantabria

- CD Tropezón
- SD Noja

Group IV – Basque Country (Basque Country (autonomous community))

- None

Group V – Catalonia

- Palamós CF

Group VI – Valencian Community

- Benidorm CD

Group VII – Community of Madrid

- CD Móstoles

Group VIII – Castile and León

- None

Group IX – E. Andalusia and Melilla

- None

Group X – W. Andalusia and Ceuta

- AD Ceuta
- Algeciras CF

Group XI – Balearic Islands

- None

Group XII – Canary Islands

- Universidad LPGC CF

Group XIII – Region of Murcia

- Cartagonova CF
- Águilas CF

Group XIV – Extremadura

- Jerez CF

Group XV – Navarre and La Rioja

- CD Calahorra

Group XVI – Aragon

- CD Binéfar

Group XVII – Castilla–La Mancha

- UB Conquense
