= Juan Ramón López Caro =

Spanish football manager (born 1963)

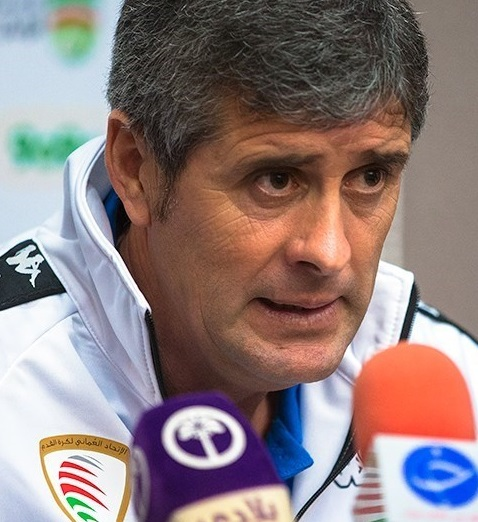
- Caro in a press conference as Oman manager in 2016

Personal information
- Full name: Juan Ramón López Caro
- Date of birth: 23 March 1963 (age 63)
- Place of birth: Lebrija, Spain

Youth career
- Years: Team
- Lebrijana
- Betis

Managerial career
- 1992–1993: Lebrijana
- 1993–1995: Lebrija
- 1995–1997: Los Palacios
- 1997–1998: Dos Hermanas
- 1998–1999: Melilla
- 1999–2001: Mallorca B
- 2000: Mallorca
- 2001–2005: Real Madrid B
- 2005–2006: Real Madrid
- 2006: Racing Santander
- 2006–2007: Levante
- 2007–2008: Celta
- 2008–2010: Spain U21
- 2010: Vaslui
- 2013–2014: Saudi Arabia
- 2016: Oman
- 2016–2017: Dalian Yifang
- 2018–2019: Shenzhen

Juan Ramón López Caro (Spanish pronunciation: [xwanraˈmon ˈlopeθ ˈkaɾo]; born 23 March 1963) is a Spanish football manager.

He managed Real Madrid and Levante in La Liga, as well as Celta and Real Madrid Castilla in the Segunda División. After a spell in charge of Spain under-21 he moved abroad, managing the national sides of Saudi Arabia and Oman and winning promotion from China League One with two clubs.

== Football career ==
=== Early career and Real Madrid ===
Born in Lebrija, Province of Seville, Andalusia, López Caro began working as coach before his 30th birthday, with clubs in his city of birth. His first job at the professional level arrived in the 1998–99 season, as he led Melilla to the first position in the Segunda División B, albeit without promotion in the playoffs. He then became manager of Mallorca B, and officially coached the first team in the UEFA Intertoto Cup against Romania's Ceahlăul Piatra Neamț in July 2000 (4–3 aggregate loss); the reserves contested this fixture as Luis Aragonés' side had not yet commenced pre-season.

Lopéz Caro signed with Real Madrid in the summer of 2001, being in charge of the reserve team and achieving promotion to Segunda División in 2005. He was promoted to the main squad in December of that year following the sacking of Vanderlei Luxemburgo, and his first game was a 2–1 away loss against Olympiacos in the group stage of the UEFA Champions League.

=== Levante, Celta and Spain U21 ===
After leaving the Santiago Bernabéu Stadium in June 2006, López Caro was appointed at fellow top-flight club Racing de Santander for a salary of €650,000 that would rise to €900,000 should the team avoid relegation. However, a month later and without leading the Cantabrians in a competitive match, he moved to Levante. The following January, days after a 3–0 defeat at city rivals Valencia, he was dismissed and Abel Resino appointed in his place.

López Caro returned to the second tier in October 2007, succeeding Hristo Stoichkov at 11th-placed Celta de Vigo. The following March he too was relieved of his duties, with the side now in eighth but nine points off the promotion places.

In May 2008, López Caro had his first international job, being placed in charge of the Spain's under-21s succeeding Iñaki Sáez. He qualified them for the 2009 UEFA European Championship in Sweden, where they were edged in the group stage by England and Germany.

=== Vaslui and Middle East ===
In June 2010, López Caro moved abroad for the first time to Liga I's Vaslui, on a three-year deal for a total €3.5 million salary subject to bonuses, therefore becoming the best paid coach in the competition's history. He was fired in October, after enduring a rocky spell in Romania.

López Caro succeeded Frank Rijkaard as manager of the Saudi Arabia national team in January 2013. After a disappointing showing in the Arabian Gulf Cup in the run-up to the 2015 AFC Asian Cup, he was dismissed in December 2014. He remained in the Middle East and was hired for the same job by Oman in January 2016, and left by mutual accord at the end of his one-year contract.

=== China ===
Remaining in Asia, López Caro was hired by Dalian Yifang of China League One in November 2016. In his only season, he won promotion to the Chinese Super League, with a record points tally and a game to spare.

In April 2018, López Caro was appointed at Shenzhen again in the second division and won promotion, this time as runners-up. He was fired at the end of July 2019 with the side second from bottom in a 12-game winless run, and succeeded by Roberto Donadoni.

== Managerial statistics ==
As of 28 July 2019

Managerial record by team and tenure
Team	Nat	From	To	Record					Ref.
Team	Nat	From	To	G	W	D	L	Win %	Ref.
Los Palacios	(Spain)	1 July 1995	30 June 1997	80	32	20	28	40.00	
Dos Hermanas	(Spain)	1 July 1997	30 June 1998	38	30	7	1	78.95	
Melilla	(Spain)	1 July 1998	30 June 1999	44	21	11	12	47.73	
Mallorca B	(Spain)	1 July 1999	30 June 2001	76	32	29	15	42.11	
Mallorca	(Spain)	30 June 2000	9 July 2000	2	1	0	1	50.00	
Real Madrid B	(Spain)	1 July 2001	4 December 2005	183	97	45	41	53.01	
Real Madrid	(Spain)	4 December 2005	3 June 2006	33	17	10	6	51.52	
Racing Santander	(Spain)	3 June 2006	6 July 2006	0	0	0	0	—	
Levante	(Spain)	6 July 2006	15 January 2007	20	5	6	9	25.00	
Celta	(Spain)	8 October 2007	11 March 2008	21	7	8	6	33.33	
Spain U21	(Spain)	1 July 2008	14 June 2010	17	9	3	5	52.94	
Vaslui	(Romania)	14 June 2010	9 October 2010	13	4	5	4	30.77	
Saudi Arabia	(Saudi Arabia)	10 January 2013	15 December 2014	22	9	5	8	40.91	
Oman	(Oman)	14 January 2016	29 November 2016	8	3	2	3	37.50	
Dalian Yifang	(China)	29 November 2016	26 December 2017	32	19	8	5	59.38	
Shenzhen	(China)	11 April 2018	July 2019	46	17	11	18	36.96	
Total				635	303	170	162	47.72	—

== Honours ==
Melilla

- Segunda División B: 1998–99

Real Madrid B

- Segunda División B: 2004–05

Dalian Yifang

- China League One: 2017

Saudi Arabia

- Arabian Gulf Cup runner-up: 2014

Individual

- China League One Best Coach: 2017
