= CP Almería =

Association football club in Spain

Polideportivo Almería
- Full name: Club Polideportivo Almería
- Nickname: Poli
- Founded: 1983
- Ground: Juventud Emilio Campra, Almería, Spain
- Capacity: 2,000
- President: Rafael Garay Díaz
- Head coach: Juan Francisco Miras Quirós "Juanfran"
- League: División de Honor – Group 2
- 2024–25: Tercera Federación – Group 9, 17th of 18 (relegated)
- Website: www.polialmeria.es
Home colours	Away colours

Club Polideportivo Almería is a football club based in the city of Almería, Andalusia, in Spain. It currently plays in División de Honor – Group 2, holding home matches at Estadio Juventud Emilio Campra, which holds a capacity of 2,000 people.

== History ==
Polideportivo Almería started to play in 1983 in Regional Preferente, fifth tier, achieving promotion to Tercera División in its first season. Two years later, the club promoted for the first time to Segunda División B, third tier, where it would play from 1986 to 1989, when it was relegated again to Tercera. The club had serious economic problems that almost made the entity disappear. The team managed to play the season, but finished in the middle of the table.

In 1994, Polideportivo Almería promoted again to Segunda División B, where it would play during seven seasons completing the best years of the history of the club. In 1999, Poli played the promotion playoffs to Segunda División, but it finished in the third position in its group, with Levante (promoted team), Real Madrid B and Bermeo. During the 1999–2000 Copa del Rey, Polideportivo Almería faced FC Barcelona in the second round. Poli earned a 0–0 draw in the first leg, played at home, but lost 2–0 at Camp Nou with the two goals scored in the last minutes.

In 2001, due to its financial trouble, Poli Almería would withdraw from Segunda División B and ceased in activity. Two years later, the club registered again to play in the Provincial leagues but in 2007 retired its teams from competition.

In 2012, Polideportivo Almería returns again to competition controlled by a new board, that gave it a new philosophy based on a claim of popular football. The club is democratically run by its members who have equal voting rights and own one share in the club each.

In 2016, the club promoted to the fifth tier, this time called División de Honor. Two years later, Poli came back to Tercera División 24 years after their last participation.

In the 2018–19 season the club finished 13th in Tercera División, Group 9. On July 9, 2019, the club officially presented its new head coach Alvaro García Búrdalo.

== Season to season ==
Season	Tier	Division	Place	Copa del Rey
1983–84	5	Reg. Pref.	2nd	
1984–85	4	3ª	2nd	
1985–86	4	3ª	1st	Third round
1986–87	3	2ª B	20th	First round
1987–88	3	2ª B	14th	Third round
1988–89	3	2ª B	17th	First round
1989–90	4	3ª	10th	
1990–91	4	3ª	13th	
1991–92	4	3ª	5th	
1992–93	4	3ª	3rd	
1993–94	4	3ª	1st	First round
1994–95	3	2ª B	15th	First round
1995–96	3	2ª B	9th	
1996–97	3	2ª B	16th	
1997–98	3	2ª B	14th	
1998–99	3	2ª B	4th	
1999–2000	3	2ª B	5th	Second round
2000–01	3	2ª B	(R)	Preliminary
2001–02	DNP			
2002–03	DNP			

Season	Tier	Division	Place	Copa del Rey
2003–04	7	1ª Prov.	8th	
2004–05	7	1ª Prov.	8th	
2005–06	7	1ª Prov.	11th	
2006–07	7	1ª Prov.	6th	
2007–2012	DNP			
2012–13	6	Reg. Pref.	6th	
2013–14	6	Reg. Pref.	8th	
2014–15	6	2ª And.	4th	
2015–16	6	2ª And.	1st	
2016–17	5	Div. Hon.	12th	
2017–18	5	Div. Hon.	3rd	
2018–19	4	3ª	13th	
2019–20	4	3ª	15th	
2020–21	4	3ª	8th / 6th	
2021–22	6	Div. Hon.	11th	
2022–23	6	Div. Hon.	2nd	
2023–24	5	3ª Fed.	8th	
2024–25	5	3ª Fed.	17th	
2025–26	6	Div. Hon.		

- 10 seasons in Segunda División B
- 10 seasons in Tercera División
- 2 seasons in Tercera Federación
