= Harvey Esajas =

Dutch footballer (born 1974)

Personal information
- Full name: Harvey Delano Esajas
- Date of birth: 13 June 1974 (age 52)
- Place of birth: Amsterdam, Netherlands
- Height: 1.85 m (6 ft 1 in)
- Position: Defender

Youth career
- ASV Wartburgia
- Buitenveldert
- Ajax
- Anderlecht

Senior career*
Years	Team	Apps	(Gls)
1993–1995	Feyenoord	8	(1)
1996	Cambuur	8	(0)
1996–1997	Groningen	9	(0)
1998–1999	Dordrecht '90	7	(0)
1999	Móstoles	10	(0)
1999–2000	Real Madrid B	0	(0)
2000	Zamora	20	(0)
2002–2003	Transvaal		
2004–2005	Milan	0	(0)
2005–2006	Legnano	3	(0)
2006	Lecco	1	(0)
Total		66	(1)
- * Club domestic league appearances and goals

Harvey Delano Esajas (born 13 June 1974) is a Dutch retired footballer who played as a defender.

== Career ==
=== Feyenoord and Eerste Divisie ===
Born in Amsterdam of Surinamese descent, Esajas made his debut in professional football in 1993–94 with Feyenoord, after spending his youth years in the football schools of Anderlecht and Ajax. Prior to the start of the season, he was a key factor in the Helderse affaire: Feyenoord played a friendly match with an amateur XI, the Helderse Selectie, and during the game he was alledged to have knocked down opponent Ronald Schouten, breaking his jaw but not being eventually suspended for his actions.

Esajas made his Eredivisie debut on 24 October 1993 against Ajax, and managed to score in one of the most prestigious clash in the Netherlands, in a 2–2 away draw. Despite this promising start he did not make it as a regular in Feyenoord's first team, and only played in five games; during his first season at De Kuip the team won the Dutch Cup and, the following campaign, he only appeared three times, while he was not used at all in 1995–96. In February 1996, he moved to Cambuur in the Eerste Divisie, signing until the end of the season, with the option of a further season.

Upon leaving Rotterdam, Esajas signed with Groningen. There, he was played rarely. In the 1998–99 season, he appeared in seven matches for Dordrecht'90, also in the second level.

=== Retirement and return ===
Esajas decided to move abroad and was able to have trials at Fiorentina and Torino in Italy, but neither offered him a contract. He then tried to find a club in Spain, spending some time at Mostoles, Real Madrid Castilla and Zamora, but did not succeed at any, thus deciding to end his career and find a regular job as a travel agent.

Esajas disappeared out of the world of football for a long time, until 2004 (during this time, he also worked as a dish washer). Upon a visit to his close friend Clarence Seedorf, who played at AC Milan, he spoke of his wish to return to professional football – at that time his weight was over 100 kg and he had not touched a ball in three years time. Seedorf went to club coach Carlo Ancelotti and told him as a joke he could have a defender for free. The manager's reaction was skeptical, but he accepted the challenge and gave Esajas the opportunity to train at Milanello for a while; in three months time, the player lost 15 kg and in June 2004 was in footballing shape again, thus being offered a contract.

When 2004–05 Serie A began, Esajas was one of Milan's last options on the bench but, in January 2005, he was given a few minutes of play for his hard work. He came on as a substitute three minutes before time in the Italian Cup match against Palermo for Massimo Ambrosini, and was even able to create a scoring opportunity for Jon Dahl Tomasson, whose shot was saved in an eventual 2–0 home win.

Subsequently, Esajas was part of the Milan squad in Istanbul when they played and lost on penalties to Liverpool in the 2005 Champions League final. He did not play any more matches for the Rossoneri, but moved to Serie C team Legnano instead, also representing Lecco in that same season, before ending his career for the second and definitive time.

Esajas himself described the story of his career as follows: "The incredible story of the man who made the impossible thing possible."

== Career statistics ==
Appearances and goals by club, season and competition
Club	Season	League		
Club	Season	Division	Apps	Goals
Feyenoord	1993–94	Eredivisie	5	1
Feyenoord	1994–95	Eredivisie	3	0
Feyenoord	1995–96	Eredivisie	0	0
Feyenoord	Total		8	1
Cambuur	1995–96	Eerste Divisie	0	0
Groningen	1996–97	Eredivisie	9	0
Dordrecht'90	1998–99	Eerste Divisie	7	0
Móstoles	1998–99	Segunda División B	10	0
Real Madrid B	1999–2000	Segunda División B	0	0
Zamora	1999–2000	Segunda División B	9	0
Zamora	2000–01	Segunda División B	11	0
Zamora	Total		20	0
Transvaal	2002–03	Hoofdklasse		0
AC Milan	2004–05	Serie A	0	0
Legnano	2005–06	Serie C1	3	0
Lecco	2005–06	Serie C1	1	0
Career total			58	1
