= 1999 Segunda División B play-offs =

Spanish football league play-offs

The 1999 Segunda División B play-offs (Playoffs de Ascenso or Promoción de Ascenso) were the final playoffs for promotion from Spanish 1998–99 Segunda División B to the 1999–2000 Segunda División. The four first placed teams in each of the four Segunda División B groups played the Playoffs de Ascenso and the four last placed teams in Segunda División were relegated to Segunda División B.

The teams play a league of four teams, divided into 4 groups. The champion of each group is promoted to Segunda División.

== Group A ==
=== League table ===
Pos	Team	Pld	W	D	L	GF	GA	GD	Pts	Promotion or relegation
1	Elche CF (P)	6	3	3	0	7	4	+3	12	Promotion to Segunda División
2	Burgos CF	6	2	1	3	7	7	0	7	
3	Universidad de Las Palmas	6	1	4	1	5	5	0	7	
4	UD Melilla	6	1	2	3	3	6	−3	5	

Source: arquero-arba
Rules for classification: 1st points; 2nd head-to-head points; 3rd head-to-head goal difference; 4th head-to-head goals scored; 5th goal difference; 6th number of goals scored
(P) Promoted

=== Results ===
Home \ Away	ELC	BUR	ULP	MEL
Elche CF		2–2	0–0	2–1
Burgos CF	0–1		2–1	2–0
Universidad de Las Palmas	1–1	3–1		0–0
UD Melilla	0–1	1–0	1–1	

Source: arquero-arba
Legend: Blue = home team win; Yellow = draw; Red = away team win.

== Group B ==
=== League table ===
Pos	Team	Pld	W	D	L	GF	GA	GD	Pts	Promotion or relegation
1	Getafe CF (P)	6	4	2	0	11	5	+6	14	Promotion to Segunda División
2	Barakaldo CF	6	3	2	1	11	6	+5	11	
3	Real Murcia	6	1	2	3	6	8	−2	5	
4	Sevilla FC B	6	1	0	5	5	14	−9	3	

Source: arquero-arba
Rules for classification: 1st points; 2nd head-to-head points; 3rd head-to-head goal difference; 4th head-to-head goals scored; 5th goal difference; 6th number of goals scored
(P) Promoted

=== Results ===
Home \ Away	GET	BAR	RMU	SEV
Getafe CF		1–1	1–1	2–0
Barakaldo CF	2–3		1–0	3–1
Real Murcia	0–2	1–1		4–2
Sevilla FC B	1–2	0–3	1–0	

Source: arquero-arba
Legend: Blue = home team win; Yellow = draw; Red = away team win.

== Group C ==
=== League table ===
Pos	Team	Pld	W	D	L	GF	GA	GD	Pts	Promotion or relegation
1	Levante UD (P)	6	4	2	0	15	6	+9	14	Promotion to Segunda División
2	Real Madrid B	6	1	4	1	6	6	0	7	
3	CP Almería	6	1	3	2	10	12	−2	6	
4	Club Bermeo	6	1	1	4	11	18	−7	4	

Source: arquero-arba
Rules for classification: 1st points; 2nd head-to-head points; 3rd head-to-head goal difference; 4th head-to-head goals scored; 5th goal difference; 6th number of goals scored
(P) Promoted

=== Results ===
Home \ Away	LEV	RMA	ALM	BER
Levante UD		1–1	2–2	4–0
Real Madrid B	0–2		2–2	3–1
CP Almería	0–1	0–0		2–4
Club Bermeo	3–5	0–0	3–4	

Source: arquero-arba
Legend: Blue = home team win; Yellow = draw; Red = away team win.

== Group D ==
=== League table ===
Pos	Team	Pld	W	D	L	GF	GA	GD	Pts	Promotion or relegation
1	Córdoba CF (P)	6	4	0	2	7	7	0	12	Promotion to Segunda División
2	Cartagonova FC	6	3	1	2	6	5	+1	10	
3	Racing Ferrol	6	2	1	3	8	5	+3	7	
4	Cultural Leonesa	6	2	0	4	4	8	−4	6	

Source: arquero-arba
Rules for classification: 1st points; 2nd head-to-head points; 3rd head-to-head goal difference; 4th head-to-head goals scored; 5th goal difference; 6th number of goals scored
(P) Promoted

=== Results ===
Home \ Away	COR	CAR	RFE	CLE
Córdoba CF		2–0	1–0	2–0
Cartagonova FC	1–2		2–0	1–0
Racing Ferrol	5–0	0–0		3–0
Cultural Leonesa	1–0	1–2	2–0	

Source: arquero-arba
Legend: Blue = home team win; Yellow = draw; Red = away team win.
