= 1998–99 Copa del Rey =

97th Copa del Rey

Tournament details
- Country: Spain
- Teams: 68

Final positions
- Champions: Valencia
- Runners-up: Atlético de Madrid

Tournament statistics
- Matches played: 133
- Goals scored: 315 (2.37 per match)
- Top goal scorer: Claudio López (8 goals)

The 1998–99 Copa del Rey was the 97th staging of the Copa del Rey.

The competition started on 1 September 1998 and concluded on 26 June 1999 with the Final, held at the Estadio de La Cartuja in Sevilla.

Valencia defeated Atlético de Madrid in the final.

== First round ==
Team 1	Agg.	Team 2	1st leg	2nd leg
Cádiz CF	4–3	Granada CF	2–2	2–1
Terrassa FC	2–4	Levante UD	1–1	1–3
Talavera CF	3–1	CD Toledo	1–1	2–0
Palamós CF	2–4	Benidorm CF	1–1	1–3
CD Lealtad	2–4	Sporting de Gijón	2–1	0–3
CD Lalín	1–4	UD Las Palmas	1–0	0–4
Cultural Leonesa	3–3	CD Numancia	2–2	1–1
SD Noja	0–4	CA Osasuna	0–1	0–3
Elche CF	2–1	Hércules CF	1–0	1–1
UE Lleida	4–1	Águilas CF	3–0	1–1
UB Conquense	0–4	Albacete Balompié	0–3	0–1
Real Jaén	1–3	Sevilla FC	1–1	0–2
Algeciras CF	1–3	Recreativo de Huelva	1–0	0–3
Xerez CD	2–3	Málaga CF	2–1	0–2
Universidad de Las Palmas CF	2–3	SD Compostela	1–1	1–2
SD Beasain	1–1	SD Eibar	0–0	1–1
CD Calahorra	1–3	CD Ourense	1–1	0–2
CD Móstoles	1–4	CD Badajoz	1–2	0–2
Jerez CF	4–3	Rayo Vallecano	2–2	2–1
UD San Sebastián de los Reyes	2–2	CP Mérida	1–0	1–2

== Second round ==
Second Round [Sep 24; Oct 7]

Team 1	Agg.	Team 2	1st leg	2nd leg
Elche CF	2–3	Benidorm CF	1–1	1–2
SD Beasain	3–1	CD Logroñés	3–1	0–0
CD Tropezón	0–4	UE Lleida	0–0	0–4
Barakaldo CF	2–5	CD Numancia	0–2	2–3
CD Binéfar	0–2	CA Osasuna	0–0	0–2
CD Ourense	0–0 (3–4)	Sporting de Gijón	0–0	0–0
Jerez CF	3–1	Recreativo de Huelva	2–1	1–0
Cartagonova CF	1–6	Levante UD	0–2	1–4
UD San Sebastián de los Reyes	4–3	Albacete Balompié	2–1	2–2
CP Cacereño	2–6	Sevilla FC	0–4	2–2
Talavera CF	1–1	CD Leganés	0–0	1–1
Cádiz CF	1–6	Málaga CF	1–3	0–3
UD Las Palmas	2–1	SD Compostela	2–0	0–1
AD Ceuta	1–3	CD Badajoz	0–1	1–2

== Third round ==
Team 1	Agg.	Team 2	1st leg	2nd leg
UD Las Palmas	2–2	Deportivo Alavés	0–0	2–2
Levante UD	0–0 (4–1)	CF Extremadura	0–0	0–0
Sevilla FC	2–0	UD Salamanca	0–0	2–0
UD San Sebastián de los Reyes	2–4 (aet)	CD Tenerife	2–0	0–4
Sporting de Gijón	3–3	Real Zaragoza	1–1	2–2
Málaga CF	3–5	Real Valladolid	1–2	2–3
Talavera CF	0–4	Villarreal CF	0–1	0–3
CD Numancia	1–2 (aet)	Racing de Santander	0–1	1–1
Jerez CF	2–6	RC Deportivo de La Coruña	1–3	1–3
CD Badajoz	4–1	Real Oviedo	3–1	1–0
UE Lleida	1–3	CA Osasuna	1–1	0–2
SD Beasain	0–1	Benidorm CF	0–0	0–1

== Fourth round ==
Fourth Round [Dec 16; Jan 13]

Team 1	Agg.	Team 2	1st leg	2nd leg
Deportivo de La Coruña	2–1	Sporting de Gijón	1–1	1–0
UD Las Palmas	0–1	Levante UD	0–1	0–0
Racing de Santander	2–1	CA Osasuna	2–0	0–1
Real Valladolid	2–2 (11–10)	CD Badajoz	1–1	1–1
Villarreal CF	5–3	Sevilla FC	2–2	3–1
CD Tenerife	2–2	Benidorm CF	2–2	0–0

== Bracket ==
Round of 16
1	(Basque Country (autonomous community)) Real Sociedad	1	1	2
16	(Community of Madrid) Atlético Madrid (a)	2	0	2
8	(Catalonia) Espanyol	4	2	6
9	(Castile and León) Valladolid	2	2	4
5	(Andalusia) Real Betis	0	0	0
12	(Balearic Islands) Mallorca	1	1	2
4	(Galicia (Spain)) Celta Vigo	0	1	1
13	(Galicia (Spain)) Deportivo de A Coruña	1	1	2
6	(Valencian Community) Benidorm	0	0	0
11	(Catalonia) Barcelona	1	3	4
3	(Valencian Community) Levante	0	0	0
14	(Valencian Community) Valencia	3	1	4
7	(Basque Country (autonomous community)) Athletic Bilbao	2	0	2
10	(Cantabria) Racing Santander	2	1	3
2	(Community of Madrid) Real Madrid	2	2	4
15	(Valencian Community) Villarreal	0	0	0

Quarter-finals
(Community of Madrid) Atlético Madrid	2	4	6
(Catalonia) Espanyol	1	1	2
(Balearic Islands) Mallorca	1	0	1
(Galicia (Spain)) Deportivo de A Coruña	1	1	2
(Catalonia) Barcelona	2	3	5
(Valencian Community) Valencia	3	4	7
(Cantabria) Racing Santander	2	0	2
(Community of Madrid) Real Madrid	6	1	7

Semi-finals
(Community of Madrid) Atlético Madrid	0	1	1
(Galicia (Spain)) Deportivo de A Coruña	0	0	0
(Valencian Community) Valencia	6	1	7
(Community of Madrid) Real Madrid	0	2	2

Final
(Community of Madrid) Atlético Madrid	0
(Valencian Community) Valencia	3

== Round of 16 ==
Team 1	Agg.	Team 2	1st leg	2nd leg
Real Madrid	4–0	Villarreal CF	2–0	2–0
RCD Espanyol	6–4	Real Valladolid	4–2	2–2
RC Celta de Vigo	1–2	RC Deportivo de La Coruña	0–1	1–1
Athletic Bilbao	2–3	Racing de Santander	2–2	0–1
Levante UD	0–4	Valencia CF	0–3	0–1
Benidorm CF	0–4	FC Barcelona	0–1	0–3
Real Sociedad	2–2	Atlético de Madrid	1–2	1–0
Real Betis	0–2	RCD Mallorca	0–1	0–1

== Quarter-finals ==
Team 1	Agg.	Team 2	1st leg	2nd leg
Racing de Santander	2–7	Real Madrid	2–6	0–1
Atlético de Madrid	6–2	RCD Espanyol	2–1	4–1
RCD Mallorca	1–2	RC Deportivo de La Coruña	1–1	0–1
FC Barcelona	5–7	Valencia CF	2–3	3–4

== Semi-finals ==
Team 1	Agg.	Team 2	1st leg	2nd leg
Valencia CF	7–2	Real Madrid CF	6–0	1–2
Atlético de Madrid	1–0	RC Deportivo de La Coruña	0–0	1–0

== Final ==
26 June 1999
21:30 CEST

Atlético Madrid	0–3	Valencia
	Report	López 22', 81'; Mendieta 33'

La Cartuja, Sevilla
Attendance: 45,000
Referee: Manuel Díaz Vega

== Top goalscorers ==
Goalscorers	Goals	Team
(Argentina) Claudio López	8	Valencia
(Spain) Fernando Morientes	6	Real Madrid
(Spain) Gaizka Mendieta	5	Valencia
(Federal Republic of Yugoslavia) Igor Gluščević	4	Sevilla
(Russia) Dmitri Cheryshev	4	Sporting Gijón
(Spain) José Mari	4	Atlético Madrid
(Spain) Israel	4	Jerez
(Argentina) Mariano Armentano	3	Elche
(Angola) Constantino	3	Levante
(Argentina) Turu Flores	3	Deportivo La Coruña
