= 1984–85 Tercera División =

Tercera División
- Season: 1984–85

The 1984–85 Tercera División season is the 8th season since establishment the tier four.

== League tables ==
=== Group I ===
Pos	Team	Pld	W	D	L	GF	GA	GD	Pts
1	Lalín	38	24	9	5	58	23	+35	57
2	Ourense	38	20	13	5	63	23	+40	53
3	Racing de Ferrol	38	19	10	9	56	25	+31	48
4	Lugo	38	19	10	9	42	32	+10	48
5	Céltiga	38	17	13	8	43	29	+14	47
6	Arenteiro	38	19	8	11	41	24	+17	46
7	Gran Peña	38	14	12	12	42	34	+8	40
8	Viveiro	38	12	15	11	36	22	+14	39
9	Boiro	38	15	9	14	40	44	−4	39
10	Fabril Deportivo	38	13	11	14	33	37	−4	37
11	Tyde	38	15	7	16	44	45	−1	37
12	Barco	38	14	8	16	44	42	+2	36
13	Vista Alegre	38	10	13	15	39	43	−4	33
14	Coruxo	38	12	9	17	44	60	−16	33
15	Alondras	38	10	12	16	26	39	−13	32
16	San Martín	38	9	14	15	31	45	−14	32
17	Endesa As Pontes	38	8	15	15	29	42	−13	31
18	Turista	38	8	15	15	30	45	−15	31
19	Lemos	38	4	15	19	19	55	−36	23
20	Noia	38	7	4	27	25	76	−51	18

=== Group II ===
Pos	Team	Pld	W	D	L	GF	GA	GD	Pts
1	Siero	38	24	8	6	74	41	+33	56
2	San Martín	38	21	11	6	57	29	+28	53
3	Castro	38	21	10	7	62	27	+35	52
4	Langreo	38	22	7	9	79	42	+37	51
5	Rayo Cantabria	38	19	12	7	69	44	+25	50
6	Gimnástica de Torrelavega	38	21	7	10	60	36	+24	49
7	Turón	38	18	7	13	58	46	+12	43
8	Caudal	38	15	12	11	62	41	+21	42
9	Real Oviedo Aficionado	38	14	11	13	56	47	+9	39
10	Lenense	38	14	6	18	47	55	−8	34
11	Santoña	38	14	6	18	44	50	−6	34
12	Barquereño	38	14	5	19	40	70	−30	33
13	Mosconia	38	10	12	16	44	42	+2	32
14	Naval	38	10	12	16	35	46	−11	32
15	Laredo	38	12	8	18	44	60	−16	32
16	Atlético Camocha	38	11	9	18	52	71	−19	31
17	Titánico	38	10	9	19	43	75	−32	29
18	Europa de Nava	38	8	11	19	47	73	−26	27
19	Cayón	38	10	6	22	32	59	−27	26
20	Barreda	38	4	7	27	31	82	−51	15

=== Group III ===
Pos	Team	Pld	W	D	L	GF	GA	GD	Pts
1	Baskonia	38	21	14	3	53	19	+34	56
2	Eibar	38	20	13	5	56	28	+28	53
3	Amorebieta	38	17	16	5	50	26	+24	50
4	Barakaldo	38	18	10	10	58	50	+8	46
5	Durango	38	16	13	9	58	36	+22	45
6	Zalla	38	17	5	16	52	57	−5	39
7	Gernika	38	14	10	14	41	39	+2	38
8	Real Unión	38	12	13	13	54	47	+7	37
9	Bergara	38	14	8	16	36	45	−9	36
10	Hernani	38	12	11	15	46	57	−11	35
11	Arenas de Getxo	38	7	21	10	28	34	−6	35
12	Tolosa	38	11	13	14	47	45	+2	35
13	Santurtzi	38	9	17	12	38	33	+5	35
14	Mutriku	38	13	8	17	36	49	−13	34
15	Anaitasuna	38	10	14	14	45	53	−8	34
16	Santutxu	38	9	15	14	40	46	−6	33
17	Aurrerá de Ondarroa	38	11	10	17	38	48	−10	32
18	Lemona	38	11	9	18	40	68	−28	31
19	Getxo	38	10	9	19	46	58	−12	29
20	Deusto	38	7	13	18	36	60	−24	27

=== Group IV ===
Pos	Team	Pld	W	D	L	GF	GA	GD	Pts
1	Huesca	38	21	11	6	62	34	+28	53
2	Izarra	38	21	5	12	64	49	+15	47
3	Sabiñánigo	38	19	9	10	63	49	+14	47
4	Teruel	38	20	6	12	65	44	+21	46
5	Arnedo	38	18	9	11	57	46	+11	45
6	Ejea	38	17	11	10	60	43	+17	45
7	Corellano	38	18	7	13	72	63	+9	43
8	Numancia	38	14	13	11	45	38	+7	41
9	Atlético Monzón	38	13	14	11	62	60	+2	40
10	Peña Sport	38	16	8	14	45	51	−6	40
11	Atlético Cirbonero	38	12	14	12	57	53	+4	38
12	Tudelano	38	14	9	15	53	54	−1	37
13	Mirandés	38	13	10	15	60	46	+14	36
14	Calahorra	38	13	8	17	56	57	−1	34
15	Oberena	38	13	7	18	49	59	−10	33
16	Alsasua	38	10	13	15	50	66	−16	33
17	Barbastro	38	11	10	17	56	56	0	32
18	Tarazona	38	8	11	19	53	70	−17	27
19	Alfaro	38	8	10	20	54	86	−32	26
20	Chantrea	38	6	5	27	32	91	−59	17

=== Group V ===
Pos	Team	Pld	W	D	L	GF	GA	GD	Pts
1	Sant Andreu	38	25	7	6	73	30	+43	57
2	Lloret	38	25	3	10	67	42	+25	53
3	Terrassa	38	18	13	7	75	41	+34	49
4	Europa	38	18	12	8	65	39	+26	48
5	Banyoles	38	18	10	10	74	57	+17	46
6	Júpiter	38	18	8	12	53	42	+11	44
7	Girona	38	18	8	12	62	41	+21	44
8	Igualada	38	15	13	10	59	51	+8	43
9	Granollers	38	15	12	11	58	42	+16	42
10	Horta	38	15	11	12	43	39	+4	41
11	Badalona	38	13	15	10	44	48	−4	41
12	Vilafranca	38	13	12	13	38	35	+3	38
13	Manresa	38	11	14	13	36	43	−7	36
14	Manlleu	38	15	5	18	54	61	−7	35
15	Gavà	38	14	6	18	40	50	−10	34
16	Prat	38	11	11	16	40	55	−15	33
17	Mollerussa	38	7	13	18	38	61	−23	27
18	Santboià	38	8	7	23	31	61	−30	23
19	Reus	38	4	7	27	34	88	−54	15
20	Olot	38	2	7	29	27	85	−58	11

=== Group VI ===
Pos	Team	Pld	W	D	L	GF	GA	GD	Pts
1	Mestalla	38	24	10	4	74	27	+47	58
2	Alzira	38	21	12	5	58	24	+34	54
3	Burriana	38	22	7	9	70	45	+25	51
4	Benidorm	38	20	11	7	61	37	+24	51
5	Gandía	38	16	11	11	50	35	+15	43
6	Villajoyosa	38	17	9	12	58	49	+9	43
7	Carcaixent	38	18	4	16	47	41	+6	40
8	Castellón Aficionados	38	13	11	14	55	54	+1	37
9	Catarroja	38	13	9	16	46	50	−4	35
10	Alicante	38	10	14	14	53	44	+9	34
11	Rayo Ibense	38	13	8	17	37	61	−24	34
12	Novelda	38	14	5	19	41	50	−9	33
13	Vinaròs	38	12	9	17	37	51	−14	33
14	Villarreal	38	9	15	14	29	46	−17	33
15	Benicarló	38	13	6	19	49	64	−15	32
16	Ontinyent	38	12	8	18	42	60	−18	32
17	Villena	38	14	4	20	38	60	−22	32
18	Torrente	38	10	11	17	40	41	−1	31
19	Aspense	38	12	7	19	47	56	−9	31
20	Dénia	38	9	5	24	29	66	−37	23

=== Group VII ===
Pos	Team	Pld	W	D	L	GF	GA	GD	Pts
1	Real Madrid Aficionados (Note: Real Madrid Aficionados renounced to play the promotion play off)	38	23	5	10	66	40	+26	51
2	Valdepeñas	38	21	9	8	59	36	+23	51
3	Leganés	38	16	14	8	55	37	+18	46
4	Alcorcón	38	16	12	10	59	52	+7	44
5	Real Ávila	38	12	19	7	55	40	+15	43
6	Guadalajara	38	16	11	11	68	46	+22	43
7	Gimnástica Segoviana	38	15	10	13	63	58	+5	40
8	Real Aranjuez	38	14	12	12	54	55	−1	40
9	Conquense	38	14	11	13	41	46	−5	39
10	Azuqueca	38	14	11	13	52	50	+2	39
11	San Fernando de Henares	38	15	7	16	43	44	−1	37
12	Pegaso	38	13	11	14	49	51	−2	37
13	Daimiel	38	14	9	15	51	57	−6	37
14	Fuensalida	38	12	12	14	45	53	−8	36
15	Manchego	38	11	12	15	40	45	−5	34
16	Atlético Madrileño	38	10	13	15	42	50	−8	33
17	Móstoles	38	9	13	16	43	49	−6	31
18	Ciempozuelos	38	10	10	18	37	48	−11	30
19	Gimnástico Alcázar	38	9	8	21	41	73	−32	26
20	Arganda	38	8	7	23	41	74	−33	23

=== Group VIII ===
Pos	Team	Pld	W	D	L	GF	GA	GD	Pts
1	Burgos	38	28	8	2	97	13	+84	64
2	Cultural Leonesa	38	27	6	5	86	27	+59	60
3	Ponferradina	38	28	4	6	95	21	+74	60
4	Real Valladolid Promesas	38	27	5	6	87	23	+64	59
5	Salmantino	38	21	8	9	66	42	+24	50
6	Atlético Astorga	38	18	6	14	61	49	+12	42
7	Gimnástica Medinense	38	16	8	14	47	56	−9	40
8	Toreno	38	13	13	12	53	38	+15	39
9	Atlético Bembibre	38	12	14	12	54	46	+8	38
10	Dulciora Universidad	38	16	6	16	54	60	−6	38
11	Cristo Olímpico	38	13	9	16	51	63	−12	35
12	Arandina	38	12	10	16	46	49	−3	34
13	Briviesca	38	15	4	19	56	58	−2	34
14	Venta de Baños	38	11	9	18	47	64	−17	31
15	Béjar Industrial	38	10	10	18	44	51	−7	30
16	Coyanza	38	8	11	19	35	71	−36	27
17	Olmedo	38	8	9	21	39	96	−57	25
18	Toresana	38	8	9	21	31	81	−50	25
19	La Bañeza	38	8	5	25	36	87	−51	21
20	Salas	38	2	4	32	21	111	−90	8

=== Group IX ===
Pos	Team	Pld	W	D	L	GF	GA	GD	Pts
1	Martos	38	22	10	6	78	29	+49	54
2	Polideportivo Almería	38	22	9	7	55	22	+33	53
3	Melilla	38	16	10	12	44	31	+13	42
4	Atlético Malagueño	38	16	10	12	59	35	+24	42
5	Ronda	38	14	13	11	46	45	+1	41
6	Villanueva	38	15	10	13	52	43	+9	40
7	Iliturgi	38	12	15	11	43	42	+1	39
8	Fuengirola	38	13	13	12	50	53	−3	39
9	Juventud de Torremolinos	38	13	13	12	46	50	−4	39
10	Atlético Macael	38	14	10	14	37	39	−2	38
11	Alhaurino	38	16	6	16	48	66	−18	38
12	Roquetas	38	15	7	16	56	49	+7	37
13	Estepona	38	14	8	16	50	56	−6	36
14	Baza	38	13	10	15	63	66	−3	36
15	Atlético La Zubia	38	11	13	14	51	57	−6	35
16	San Pedro	38	11	13	14	43	48	−5	35
17	Atlético Benamiel	38	10	14	14	37	51	−14	34
18	Loja	38	11	9	18	39	61	−22	31
19	Industrial de Melilla	38	10	9	19	51	78	−27	29
20	Úbeda	38	9	4	25	46	73	−27	22

=== Group X ===
Pos	Team	Pld	W	D	L	GF	GA	GD	Pts
1	Betis Deportivo	38	26	5	7	88	38	+50	57
2	Córdoba	38	26	4	8	83	23	+60	56
3	Sevilla Atlético	38	21	10	7	80	34	+46	52
4	Moguer	38	18	11	9	46	31	+15	47
5	Mairena	38	18	10	10	60	37	+23	46
6	Pozoblanco	38	16	12	10	51	40	+11	44
7	Puerto Real	38	17	9	12	42	45	−3	43
8	Coria	38	16	10	12	64	45	+19	42
9	Brenes	38	14	11	13	56	58	−2	39
10	Rute	38	14	10	14	58	54	+4	38
11	Atlético Sanluqueño	38	16	6	16	48	48	0	38
12	Imperio de Ceuta	38	14	8	16	49	52	−3	36
13	Portuense	38	13	8	17	34	45	−11	34
14	Rota	38	11	11	16	44	55	−11	33
15	Huelva Promesas	38	11	10	17	56	61	−5	32
16	Jerez Industrial	38	13	5	20	40	58	−18	31
17	Chiclana	38	11	8	19	45	61	−16	30
18	Atlético Palma del Río	38	12	5	21	49	63	−14	29
19	San Fernando	38	5	8	25	38	88	−50	18
20	Racing de Ceuta	38	5	5	28	28	123	−95	15

=== Group XI ===
Pos	Team	Pld	W	D	L	GF	GA	GD	Pts
1	Mallorca Atlético	38	25	10	3	82	22	+60	60
2	Murense	38	20	12	6	61	29	+32	52
3	Atlético Baleares	38	23	5	10	52	27	+25	51
4	Portmany	38	20	10	8	68	39	+29	50
5	Hospitalet Isla Blanca	38	17	11	10	56	48	+8	45
6	Sporting Mahonés	38	16	12	10	52	43	+9	44
7	Ibiza	38	15	13	10	55	45	+10	43
8	Constància	38	18	6	14	60	51	+9	42
9	Ferreries	38	16	10	12	53	41	+12	42
10	Badía-Cala Millor	38	14	12	12	49	42	+7	40
11	Alaior	38	11	15	12	41	40	+1	37
12	Costa Calvià	38	15	6	17	54	60	−6	36
13	Atlètic de Ciutadella	38	15	6	17	39	44	−5	36
14	Alaró	38	12	9	17	49	58	−9	33
15	Felanitx	38	11	9	18	47	59	−12	31
16	Margaritense	38	10	10	18	39	50	−11	30
17	Porreres	38	9	10	19	33	64	−31	28
18	Porto Cristo	38	8	10	20	35	57	−22	26
19	Artà	38	6	9	23	31	77	−46	21
20	Xilvar	38	4	5	29	19	79	−60	13

=== Group XII ===
Pos	Team	Pld	W	D	L	GF	GA	GD	Pts
1	Mensajero	38	22	14	2	67	16	+51	58
2	Telde	38	20	10	8	66	33	+33	50
3	Güímar	38	21	7	10	61	33	+28	49
4	Maspalomas	38	20	9	9	69	45	+24	49
5	San Andrés	38	22	5	11	69	46	+23	49
6	Orotava	38	21	6	11	61	43	+18	48
7	Las Palmas Atlético	38	22	6	10	80	36	+44	48 (Note: 2 points deducted)
8	Puerto de la Cruz	38	21	3	14	60	43	+17	45
9	Laguna	38	14	12	12	57	55	+2	40
10	Tenisca	38	15	8	15	50	46	+4	38
11	Marino	38	13	11	14	49	56	−7	37
12	Icodense	38	14	8	16	48	62	−14	36
13	Lanzarote	38	13	6	19	43	66	−23	32
14	Tenerife Aficionado	38	10	12	16	43	60	−17	32
15	Realejos	38	10	11	17	34	45	−11	31
16	Las Torres	38	8	14	16	40	65	−25	30
17	Salud	38	10	8	20	46	59	−13	28
18	Unión Tejina	38	9	9	20	43	73	−30	27
19	Ferreras	38	7	6	25	45	74	−29	20
20	Victoria	38	3	5	30	18	93	−75	11

=== Group XIII ===
Pos	Team	Pld	W	D	L	GF	GA	GD	Pts
1	Eldense	38	28	8	2	90	17	+73	64
2	Cieza	38	22	9	7	56	29	+27	53
3	Yeclano	38	23	6	9	77	36	+41	52
4	Imperial	38	18	13	7	59	33	+26	49
5	Villarrobledo	38	16	15	7	58	38	+20	47
6	Bigastro	38	18	8	12	61	52	+9	44
7	Águilas	38	14	14	10	49	49	0	42
8	Horadada	38	13	13	12	55	47	+8	39
9	Naval	38	13	12	13	49	46	+3	38
10	Caravaca	38	14	9	15	48	50	−2	37
11	Torrevieja	38	15	7	16	44	45	−1	37
12	Olímpico de Totana	38	12	13	13	53	49	+4	37
13	Torreagüera	38	11	15	12	48	46	+2	37
14	Ilicitano	38	11	14	13	53	53	0	36
15	Torre Pacheco	38	11	10	17	44	60	−16	32
16	Atlético Albacete	38	10	8	20	46	70	−24	28
17	Alcantarilla	38	9	8	21	39	62	−23	26
18	Almansa	38	6	13	19	34	60	−26	25
19	Jumilla	38	5	14	19	31	67	−36	24
20	Atlético Muleño	38	5	3	30	23	108	−85	13

=== Group XIV ===
Pos	Team	Pld	W	D	L	GF	GA	GD	Pts
1	Plasencia	38	30	6	2	130	19	+111	66
2	Extremadura	38	27	7	4	86	29	+57	61
3	Cacereño	38	26	6	6	99	28	+71	58
4	Mérida	38	23	9	6	64	33	+31	55
5	Díter Zafra	38	19	12	7	66	30	+36	50
6	Villanovense	38	19	9	10	55	32	+23	47
7	Montijo	38	13	14	11	48	47	+1	40
8	Moralo	38	10	17	11	41	39	+2	37
9	Don Benito	38	13	10	15	56	47	+9	36
10	La Estrella	38	12	12	14	34	45	−11	36
11	Sanvicenteño	38	11	12	15	35	58	−23	34
12	Fuente de Cantos	38	9	12	17	46	86	−40	30
13	Villafranca	38	9	10	19	35	70	−35	28
14	Azuaga	38	9	9	20	40	84	−44	27
15	Aceuchal	38	8	11	19	34	65	−31	27
16	Olivenza	38	8	11	19	33	60	−27	27
17	Badajoz Promesas	38	9	9	20	47	60	−13	27
18	Calamonte	38	7	11	20	32	65	−33	25
19	Atalaya	38	8	9	21	41	90	−49	25
20	Vasco Núñez	38	9	6	23	55	90	−35	24

== Promotion playoff ==
=== First round ===
Team 1	Agg.	Team 2	1st leg	2nd leg
Mallorca Atlético	3–4	Ourense	3–1	0–3
Cultural Leonesa	4–1	Eldense	2–0	2–1
Huesca	2–1	Cieza	2–0	0–1
Baskonia	7–0	Murense	4–0	3–0
Mestalla	1–2	Córdoba	1–0	0–2
Telde	2–6	Betis Deportivo	2–1	0–5
San Martín	0–2	Burgos	0–0	0–2
Lloret	5–4	Martos	4–0	1–4
Valdepeñas	2–1	Eibar	2–0	0–1
Alzira	4–3	Sant Andreu	4–2	0–1
Siero	2–3	Lalín	1–0	1–3
Mensajero	0–3	Plasencia	0–1	0–2

=== Final Round ===
Team 1	Agg.	Team 2	1st leg	2nd leg
Plasencia	1–0	Alzira	1–0	0–0
Lloret	2–3	Lalín	2–0	0–3
Betis Deportivo	11–2	Cultural Leonesa	9–1	2–1
Córdoba	5–1	Valdepeñas	4–1	1–0
Baskonia	1–2	Ourense	1–1	0–1
Burgos	1–0	Huesca	1–0	0–0

== Season records ==
- Most wins: 30, Plasencia.
- Most draws: 21, Arenas de Getxo.
- Most losses: 32, Salas.
- Most goals for: 130, Plasencia.
- Most goals against: 123, Racing de Ceuta.
- Most points: 66, Plasencia.
- Fewest wins: 2, Olot and Salas.
- Fewest draws: 3, Lloret, Puerto de la Cruz and Atlético Muleño.
- Fewest losses: 2, Burgos, Mensajero, Eldense and Plasencia.
- Fewest goals for: 18, Victoria.
- Fewest goals against: 13, Burgos.
- Fewest points: 8, Salas.
