= CD Lalín =

Spanish football club

Lalín
- Full name: Club Deportivo Lalín
- Nickname: Os Roxinegros
- Founded: 1974; 52 years ago
- Stadium: Manuel Anxo Cortizo
- Capacity: 8,000
- President: Guillermo Fernández
- Head coach: Iván Carril
- League: Tercera Federación – Group 1
- 2025–26: Preferente Futgal – Group 1, 1st of 18 (champions)
Home colours	Away colours

Club Deportivo Lalín is a Spanish football team based in Lalín, in the autonomous community of Galicia. Founded in 1974, it plays in Tercera Federación – Group 1, holding home matches at Estadio Manuel Anxo Cortizo, with a capacity of 8,000 seats.

== Season to season ==
Season	Tier	Division	Place	Copa del Rey
1976–77	5	1ª Reg.	7th	
1977–78	6	1ª Reg.	4th	
1978–79	7	2ª Reg.	1st	
1979–80	6	1ª Reg.	2nd	
1980–81	5	Reg. Pref.	2nd	
1981–82	4	3ª	12th	
1982–83	4	3ª	9th	
1983–84	4	3ª	6th	
1984–85	4	3ª	1st	First round
1985–86	3	2ª B	20th	Second round
1986–87	4	3ª	3rd	
1987–88	3	2ª B	12th	Second round
1988–89	3	2ª B	12th	First round
1989–90	3	2ª B	19th	
1990–91	4	3ª	1st	Second round
1991–92	3	2ª B	17th	First round
1992–93	4	3ª	11th	First round
1993–94	4	3ª	15th	
1994–95	4	3ª	7th	
1995–96	4	3ª	4th	

Season	Tier	Division	Place	Copa del Rey
1996–97	4	3ª	3rd	
1997–98	4	3ª	2nd	
1998–99	3	2ª B	19th	First round
1999–2000	4	3ª	4th	
2000–01	4	3ª	10th	
2001–02	4	3ª	7th	
2002–03	4	3ª	5th	
2003–04	4	3ª	5th	
2004–05	4	3ª	7th	
2005–06	4	3ª	14th	
2006–07	4	3ª	14th	
2007–08	4	3ª	2nd	
2008–09	4	3ª	6th	
2009–10	4	3ª	17th	
2010–11	5	Pref. Aut.	1st	
2011–12	4	3ª	19th	
2012–13	5	Pref. Aut.	10th	
2013–14	5	Pref. Aut.	5th	
2014–15	5	Pref. Aut.	7th	
2015–16	5	Pref.	18th	

Season	Tier	Division	Place	Copa del Rey
2016–17	6	1ª Gal.	13th	
2017–18	6	1ª Gal.	8th	
2018–19	6	1ª Gal.	8th	
2019–20	6	1ª Gal.	4th	
2020–21	DNP			
2021–22	7	1ª Gal.	4th	
2022–23	7	1ª Gal.	4th	
2023–24	6	Pref.	5th	
2024–25	6	Pref. Futgal	6th	
2025–26	6	Pref. Futgal	1st	
2026–27	5	3ª Fed.		

- 6 seasons in Segunda División B
- 24 seasons in Tercera División
- 1 season in Tercera Federación

== Notable former players ==
- (Netherlands) Martin Wolfswinkel
- (Spain) Luis César
- (Portugal) Samuel Mendes
- (Honduras) Jonathan Centeno

== Notable former managers ==
- (Spain) Fernando Vázquez
