= CD Móstoles =

Association football club from Spain

Móstoles
- Full name: Club Deportivo Móstoles
- Founded: 1955
- Ground: El Soto, Móstoles, Madrid, Spain
- Capacity: 14,000
- Chairman: Antonio Gómez
- Manager: David Galán
- 2011–12: 3ª – Group 7, 17th
Home colours	Away colours

Club Deportivo Móstoles is a Spanish football team from Móstoles, a city in the southern metropolitan area of Madrid. Founded in 1955 and he stopped playing in 2012, but in 2026 he returned to competition, holding home matches at Estadio El Soto, which sat about 14,000 spectators.

Team colours is all-blue, with white socks.

== History ==
The club was founded on September 23, 1955 with José Alejandro Arenas Molina as its first president. Móstoles made its first appearance in the country's third division in 1990–91, 35 years after its formation. It only lasted one season, however, and went on to amass a further four presences in that category in the following two decades, never lasting more than two seasons.

The club suffered relegation from the fourth level at the end of the 2011–12 campaign, thus returning to the regional championships. It folded shortly after, due to an overall debt of €234,591 owed to its players from 2011–12 and previous seasons. Every player from the 2011-12 season sued the club for wages unpaid. The players won the lawsuit.

== Season to season ==
Season	Tier	Division	Place	Copa del Rey
1955–56	6	3ª Reg.	2nd	
1956–57	6	3ª Reg.	2nd	
1957–58	5	2ª Reg.	2nd	
1958–59	4	1ª Reg.	12th	
1959–60	4	1ª Reg.	14th	
1960–61	5	2ª Reg.	13th	
1961–62	5	2ª Reg.	6th	
1962–63	5	2ª Reg.	11th	
1963–64	5	2ª Reg.	7th	
1964–65	5	2ª Reg.	6th	
1965–66	5	2ª Reg.	8th	
1966–67	5	2ª Reg.	3rd	
1967–68	5	2ª Reg.	8th	
1968–69	5	2ª Reg.	3rd	
1969–70	5	2ª Reg.	7th	
1970–71	5	2ª Reg.	14th	
1971–72	5	2ª Reg.	6th	
1972–73	5	2ª Reg.	6th	
1973–74	5	1ª Reg.	16th	
1974–75	5	1ª Reg.	2nd	

Season	Tier	Division	Place	Copa del Rey
1975–76	4	Reg. Pref.	12th	
1976–77	5	1ª Reg.	7th	
1977–78	5	Reg. Pref.	12th	
1978–79	5	Reg. Pref.	8th	
1979–80	5	Reg. Pref.	10th	
1980–81	5	Reg. Pref.	3rd	
1981–82	4	3ª	19th	
1982–83	5	Reg. Pref.	2nd	
1983–84	4	3ª	8th	
1984–85	4	3ª	17th	
1985–86	4	3ª	14th	
1986–87	5	Reg. Pref.	1st	
1987–88	4	3ª	3rd	
1988–89	4	3ª	2nd	
1989–90	4	3ª	1st	
1990–91	3	2ª B	19th	First round
1991–92	4	3ª	3rd	Second round
1992–93	4	3ª	6th	First round
1993–94	4	3ª	4th	
1994–95	3	2ª B	12th	First round

Season	Tier	Division	Place	Copa del Rey
1995–96	3	2ª B	19th	
1996–97	4	3ª	5th	
1997–98	4	3ª	2nd	
1998–99	3	2ª B	10th	First round
1999–2000	3	2ª B	20th	
2000–01	4	3ª	3rd	
2001–02	4	3ª	4th	
2002–03	4	3ª	7th	
2003–04	4	3ª	1st	

Season	Tier	Division	Place	Copa del Rey
2004–05	4	3ª	2nd	Preliminary
2005–06	3	2ª B	19th	
2006–07	4	3ª	9th	
2007–08	4	3ª	4th	
2008–09	4	3ª	11th	
2009–10	4	3ª	8th	
2010–11	4	3ª	9th	
2011–12	4	3ª	17th	

- 6 seasons in Segunda División B
- 23 seasons in Tercera División

== Notable former players ==
- (Argentina) Gustavo di Lella
- (Equatorial Guinea) (Spain) Dani Evuy
- (Netherlands) Harvey Esajas
- (Spain) Rubén de la Red
- (Spain) Jaime Mata
