= CD Tropezón =

Association football club in Spain

Coordinates: 43.330304°N 4.047338°W

Tropezón
- Full name: Club Deportivo Tropezón
- Founded: 5 June 1983; 43 years ago
- Ground: Santa Ana, Tanos, Torrelavega, Cantabria, Spain
- Capacity: 1,500
- President: Valentín Gutiérrez
- Head coach: José Gómez García
- League: Tercera Federación – Group 3
- 2025–26: Tercera Federación – Group 3, 3rd of 18
Home colours	Away colours

Club Deportivo Tropezón is a football team based in Tanos, Torrelavega in the autonomous community of Cantabria. Founded in 1983, it plays in the Tercera Federación – Group 3. Its stadium is Santa Ana with a capacity of 1,500 seats.

== History ==
El Tropezón was founded in 1983 by a few young neighbours from Tanos. Their intention was to create a "Cultural, Sport, Social and Gastronomic" club and to name it "El Tropezón", the club has been promoting aspects ever since it was founded and continues today.

During the first years of the club, the team played in the Primera Regional and Regional Preferente leagues, in which the team played for 7 years.

In the 1990–91 season, the team was promoted to Tercera División league, starting a new era for the club. For another 7 years they will remain in this category. In the 1994–95 season, the team plays its first promotion series. The team wins the 1996–97 and 1997–98 leagues, finally achieving the promotion to Segunda División B.

The team started its first year in Segunda División B playing the field they rented until, on 29 November 1998 they were relocated in the newly open "Santa Ana". The limited budget and the inexperience relegates the team back to Tercera División for the 1999–2000 season. That season would last only another year after finishing second in the league and winning in Guecho against the historic Arenas Club in the promotion series.

The return to the Segunda División B turned out to be a disappointment for the club, again the limited budget could not save the team from been relegated to Tercera División once again.

Since them the team has remained in Tercera División, playing the promotion series in 2002, 2003, 2004, 2007, 2009, 2010 and 2013. Is in year, 2013, when the team will earn the promotion back to Segunda División B. In the 2013–14 season, the team played in the League against Cantabria's most successful team, Racing de Santander, which lost two categories in a row. That season in the Segunda División B was difficult for CD Tropezón, but the club finally finished 12th, remaining its place in the league.

=== Club background ===
- Peña Deportiva Tropezón (1983–1986)
- Club Deportivo Tropezón (1986–)

== Season to season ==
Season	Tier	Division	Place	Copa del Rey
1984–85	7	2ª Reg.	3rd	
1985–86	6	1ª Reg.	12th	
1986–87	6	1ª Reg.	6th	
1987–88	5	Reg. Pref.	16th	
1988–89	5	Reg. Pref.	12th	
1989–90	5	Reg. Pref.	9th	
1990–91	5	Reg. Pref.	3rd	
1991–92	4	3ª	10th	
1992–93	4	3ª	7th	
1993–94	4	3ª	6th	First round
1994–95	4	3ª	4th	
1995–96	4	3ª	3rd	
1996–97	4	3ª	1st	
1997–98	4	3ª	1st	
1998–99	3	2ª B	19th	Second round
1999–2000	4	3ª	2nd	
2000–01	3	2ª B	19th	
2001–02	4	3ª	3rd	
2002–03	4	3ª	3rd	
2003–04	4	3ª	2nd	

Season	Tier	Division	Place	Copa del Rey
2004–05	4	3ª	5th	
2005–06	4	3ª	5th	
2006–07	4	3ª	3rd	
2007–08	4	3ª	8th	
2008–09	4	3ª	3rd	
2009–10	4	3ª	3rd	
2010–11	4	3ª	7th	
2011–12	4	3ª	5th	
2012–13	4	3ª	1st	
2013–14	3	2ª B	12th	First round
2014–15	3	2ª B	19th	
2015–16	4	3ª	9th	
2016–17	4	3ª	2nd	
2017–18	4	3ª	4th	
2018–19	4	3ª	3rd	
2019–20	4	3ª	4th	
2020–21	4	3ª	1st / 3rd	
2021–22	4	2ª RFEF	15th	
2022–23	5	3ª Fed.	3rd	
2023–24	5	3ª Fed.	6th	

Season	Tier	Division	Place	Copa del Rey
2024–25	5	3ª Fed.	2nd	
2025–26	5	3ª Fed.	3rd	First round
2026–27	5	3ª Fed.		

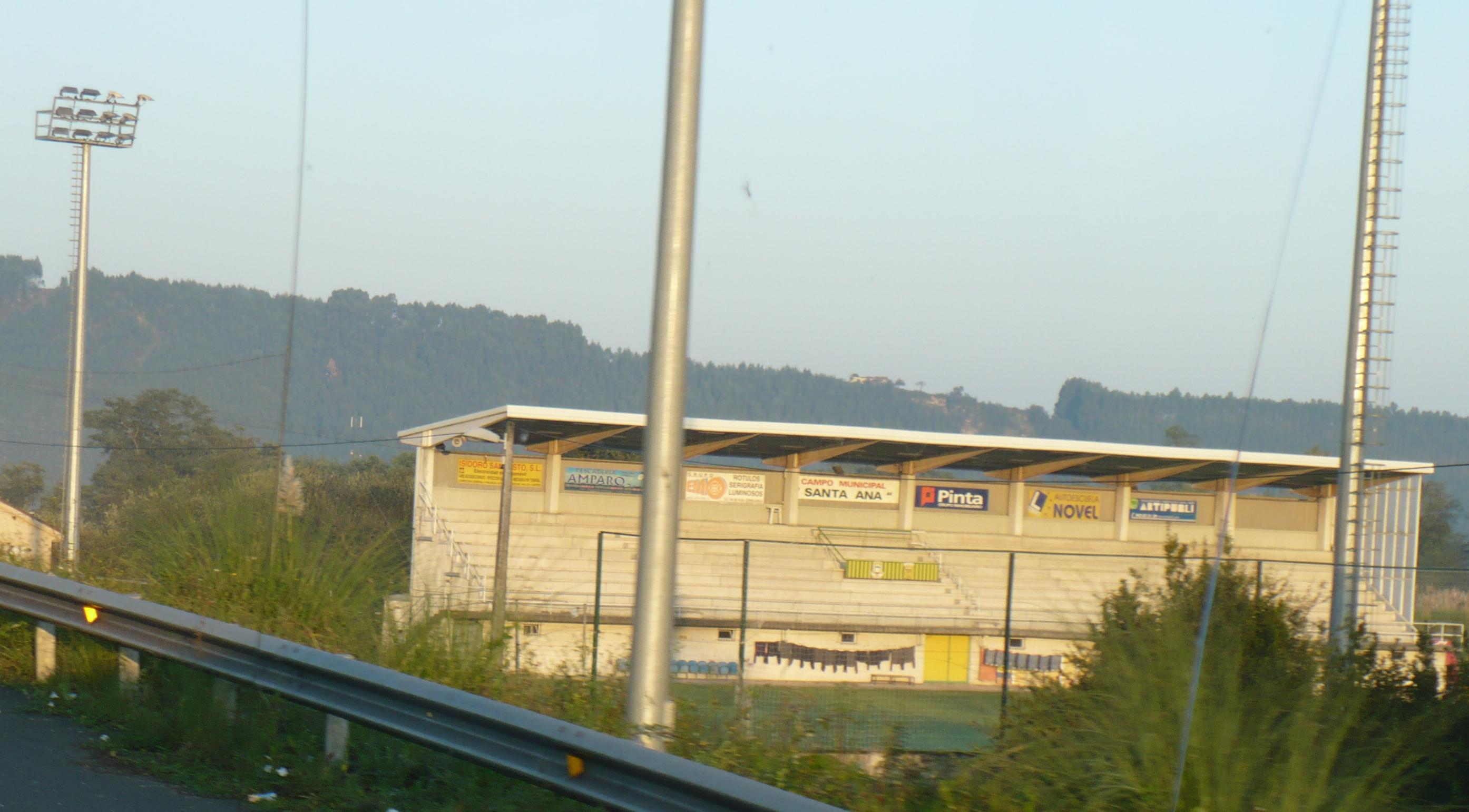
Campo de fútbol de Santa Ana, home of Tropezón

- 4 seasons in Segunda División B
- 1 season in Segunda División RFEF
- 26 seasons in Tercera División
- 5 seasons in Tercera Federación

== Current squad ==
As of 7 February 2015

Note: Flags indicate national team as defined under FIFA eligibility rules; some limited exceptions apply. Players may hold more than one non-FIFA nationality.

No.	Pos.	Nation	Player
—	GK	ESP	Iván
—	GK	ESP	Andoni
—	DF	ESP	Cote
—	DF	ESP	Jaime Bustillo
—	DF	ESP	Nacho
—	DF	ESP	Carlos Estrada
—	DF	ESP	Iñaki
—	DF	ESP	Fer
—	MF	ESP	Fran Sota
—	MF	ESP	Sergio Conde

No.	Pos.	Nation	Player
—	MF	ESP	Luis González
—	MF	ESP	Lucho
—	FW	ESP	Rafa
—	FW	ESP	Álex
—	FW	ESP	Juan Fresno
—	FW	ESP	Dani
—	FW	ESP	Juan Carlos
—	FW	ESP	Primo
—	FW	ESP	Perujo
—	FW	ESP	Vitali Bilous
