= UB Conquense =

Conquense
- Full name: Unión Balompédica Conquense
- Founded: 14 April 1946; 80 years ago
- Ground: La Fuensanta, Cuenca, Castile-La Mancha, Spain
- Capacity: 6,000
- President: Julian Cañamares
- Head coach: Nacho Alfonso
- League: Segunda Federación – Group 5
- 2025–26: Segunda Federación – Group 5, 3rd of 18
Home colours	Away colours

Unión Balompédica Conquense is a Spanish football team based in Cuenca, in the autonomous community of Castile-La Mancha. Founded in 1946, it plays in Segunda Federación – Group 5, holding home games at Estadio La Fuensanta, with a 6,000-seat capacity.

== History ==
In the 2018–19 season, the club was relegated to Tercera División by finishing 18th in the Segunda División B, Group 3. Conquense had only 3 away victories and 15 losses, the 4th worst result in the league. In June 2019, Nacho Alfonso was appointed head coach of the club. With him, the club had a good start to the season, being just 4 points behind the leader after the first 15 matches.

== Season to season ==
Season	Tier	Division	Place	Copa del Rey
1946–47	3	3ª	9th	
1947–48	3	3ª	10th	Second round
1948–49	3	3ª	5th	First round
1949–50	3	3ª	16th	
1950–51	3	3ª	10th	
1951–52	3	3ª	12th	
1952–53	3	3ª	14th	
1953–54	4	1ª Reg.		
1954–55	3	3ª	9th	
1955–56	3	3ª	10th	
1956–57	3	3ª	14th	
1957–58	3	3ª	18th	
1958–59	4	1ª Reg.	10th	
1959–60	4	1ª Reg.	4th	
1960–61	4	1ª Reg.	3rd	
1961–62	4	1ª Reg.	2nd	
1962–63	3	3ª	13th	
1963–64	3	3ª	11th	
1964–65	3	3ª	6th	
1965–66	3	3ª	5th	

Season	Tier	Division	Place	Copa del Rey
1966–67	3	3ª	4th	
1967–68	3	3ª	14th	
1968–69	4	1ª Reg.	16th	
1969–70	5	2ª Reg.	5th	
1970–71	5	2ª Reg.	1st	
1971–72	4	1ª Reg.	5th	
1972–73	4	1ª Reg.	6th	
1973–74	4	Reg. Pref.	7th	
1974–75	5	1ª Reg.	5th	
1975–76	5	1ª Reg.	1st	
1976–77	4	Reg. Pref.	13th	
1977–78	5	Reg. Pref.	10th	
1978–79	5	Reg. Pref.	3rd	
1979–80	5	Reg. Pref.	1st	
1980–81	4	3ª	12th	
1981–82	4	3ª	16th	
1982–83	4	3ª	10th	
1983–84	4	3ª	4th	
1984–85	4	3ª	9th	First round
1985–86	4	3ª	6th	

Season	Tier	Division	Place	Copa del Rey
1986–87	4	3ª	5th	Second round
1987–88	3	2ª B	19th	First round
1988–89	4	3ª	12th	First round
1989–90	4	3ª	14th	
1990–91	4	3ª	3rd	
1991–92	4	3ª	2nd	First round
1992–93	4	3ª	2nd	Third round
1993–94	4	3ª	10th	
1994–95	4	3ª	15th	
1995–96	4	3ª	8th	
1996–97	4	3ª	4th	
1997–98	4	3ª	2nd	
1998–99	3	2ª B	5th	First round
1999–2000	3	2ª B	10th	
2000–01	3	2ª B	16th	
2001–02	3	2ª B	12th	
2002–03	3	2ª B	7th	
2003–04	3	2ª B	6th	Round of 64
2004–05	3	2ª B	2nd	Round of 64
2005–06	3	2ª B	18th	Preliminary

Season	Tier	Division	Place	Copa del Rey
2006–07	4	3ª	1st	
2007–08	3	2ª B	6th	Second round
2008–09	3	2ª B	8th	Second round
2009–10	3	2ª B	10th	Second round
2010–11	3	2ª B	16th	
2011–12	3	2ª B	16th	
2012–13	4	3ª	2nd	
2013–14	3	2ª B	11th	
2014–15	3	2ª B	20th	
2015–16	4	3ª	1st	
2016–17	4	3ª	2nd	First round
2017–18	4	3ª	1st	
2018–19	3	2ª B	18th	First round
2019–20	4	3ª	6th	
2020–21	4	3ª	9th / 4th	
2021–22	5	3ª RFEF	6th	
2022–23	5	3ª Fed.	6th	
2023–24	5	3ª Fed.	1st	
2024–25	4	2ª Fed.	10th	Second round
2025–26	4	2ª Fed.	3rd	

Season	Tier	Division	Place	Copa del Rey
2026–27	4	2ª Fed.		TBD

- 18 seasons in Segunda División B
- 3 seasons in Segunda Federación
- 41 seasons in Tercera División
- 3 seasons in Tercera Federación/Tercera División RFEF

== Honours ==
- Tercera División: 2006–07, 2015–16, 2017–18
- Copa de la Liga: 1984–85 Tercera División

== Current squad ==
As of 1 March 2026

Note: Flags indicate national team as defined under FIFA eligibility rules; some limited exceptions apply. Players may hold more than one non-FIFA nationality.

No.	Pos.	Nation	Player
1	GK	NED	Dani Atanes
2	DF	ESP	Yasin Iribarren
3	DF	ESP	Nacho Ruiz
4	DF	ESP	David López
5	DF	ESP	Iñaki Olaortua
6	DF	COL	Santiago Perea
9	FW	ESP	Álvaro Sánchez
10	FW	ESP	Abderrahim Amoud
11	DF	ESP	Eghosa Nomayo
12	DF	PAN	Anthony Herbert (on loan from Árabe Unido)
13	GK	ESP	Adri López
14	MF	ESP	Bittor Isuskiza
16	MF	GBS	Malam Camará
17	MF	ESP	Mo Sedibeh

No.	Pos.	Nation	Player
19	FW	ESP	Gianfranco Peña
20	FW	ESP	Mario Rodríguez
21	FW	ESP	Ale Sánchez
22	MF	ESP	Vique Gomes
23	FW	ESP	Quique González
24	DF	ESP	Luis Martínez
26	MF	ITA	Francesco Crapisto (on loan from Juventus Next Gen)
27	MF	ESP	Mark Motilla
29	MF	ESP	Kevin Diouf
30	FW	MLI	Badra Traoré
—	GK	GRE	Konstantinos Kyriazis
—	FW	SEN	Yoro Sene
