= 1998–99 Segunda División B =

Segunda División B
- Season: 1998–99
- Promoted: Getafe; Levante; Elche; Córdoba
- Relegated: Deportivo de La Coruña B Langreo; Lalín; Lealtad; Noja; Lemona; Tropezón; Elgoibar; Espanyol B Benidorm; Palamós; Gavà; Plasencia; Almería; Moralo; Isla Cristina; Algeciras
- Top goalscorer: Changui (21 goals)
- Best goalkeeper: José Carlos Burgos (0.37 goals)
- Biggest home win: Cacereño 9–0 Isla Cristina (1 May 1999)
- Biggest away win: Isla Cristina 0–8 Polideportivo Almería (7 February 1999)
- Highest scoring: Cacereño 9–0 Isla Cristina (1 May 1999)

The 1998–99 season of Segunda División B of Spanish football started in August 1998 and ended in May 1999 after the play-offs.

== Summary before the 1998–99 season ==
Playoffs de Ascenso:

- Cacereño
- Real Madrid B
- Deportivo de La Coruña B
- Talavera
- Barakaldo
- Athletic Bilbao B
- Beasain
- Cultural Leonesa
- Barcelona B (P)
- Terrassa
- Mallorca B (P)
- Espanyol B
- Málaga (P)
- Recreativo de Huelva (P)
- Cádiz
- Granada

Relegated from Segunda División:

- Elche
- Jaén
- Xerez
- Levante

Promoted from Tercera División:

- Lalín (from Group 1)
- Lealtad (from Group 2)
- Tropezón (from Group 3)
- Noja (from Group 3)
- Palamós (from Group 5)
- Benidorm (from Group 6)
- Móstoles (from Group 7)
- San Sebastián de los Reyes (from Group 7)
- Ceuta (from Group 10)
- Algeciras (from Group 10)
- Universidad de Las Palmas (from Group 12)
- Cartagonova (from Group 13)
- Águilas (from Group 13)
- Jerez (from Group 14)
- Calahorra (from Group 15)
- Binéfar (from Group 16)
- Conquense (from Group 17)

Relegated:

- As Pontes
- Rayo Majadahonda
- Carabanchel
- Leganés B
- Racing de Santander B
- Real Unión
- Izarra
- Andorra
- Gáldar
- Novelda
- Sóller
- FC Andorra
- Lorca
- San Pedro
- Guadix
- Mar Menor
- Zamora

== Group I ==
Teams from Asturias, Canary Islands, Castilla–La Mancha, Community of Madrid and Galicia

=== Teams ===
Location of teams in Segunda División B Gr. 1 1998–99
Canary Islands

Team	Founded	Home city	Stadium
Real Avilés Industrial	1903	Avilés, Asturias	Román Sánchez Puerta
Caudal	1918	Mieres, Asturias	Hermanos Antuña
Deportivo La Coruña B	1914	A Coruña, Galicia	Anexo de Riazor
Fuenlabrada	1975	Fuenlabrada, Madrid	La Aldehuela
Getafe	1983	Getafe, Madrid	Coliseum Alfonso Pérez
Lalín	1974	Lalín, Galicia	Manuel Anxo Cortizo
Langreo	1961	Langreo, Asturias	Ganzábal
Lealtad	1916	Villaviciosa, Asturias	Las Callejas
Lugo	1953	Lugo, Galicia	Anxo Carro
Mensajero	1924	Santa Cruz de La Palma, Canary Islands	Silvestre Carrillo
Móstoles	1955	Móstoles, Community of Madrid	El Soto
Oviedo B	1930	Oviedo, Asturias	El Requexón
Pájara Playas de Jandía	1996	Pájara, Canary Islands	Benito Alonso
Pontevedra	1941	Pontevedra, Galicia	Pasarón
Racing Ferrol	1919	Ferrol, Galicia	A Malata
Real Madrid B	1930	Madrid, Madrid	Ciudad Deportiva
San Sebastián de los Reyes	1971	San Sebastián de los Reyes, Madrid	Matapiñonera
Sporting Gijón B	1960	Gijón, Asturias	Mareo
Talavera	1948	Talavera de la Reina, Castilla–La Mancha	El Prado
Universidad Las Palmas	1994	Las Palmas, Canary Islands	Campo Universitario Tafira

=== League table ===
Pos	Team	Pld	W	D	L	GF	GA	GD	Pts	Qualification or relegation
1	Getafe	38	21	9	8	50	23	+27	72	Qualification for Play-Off
2	Universidad de Las Pamas	38	17	14	7	49	35	+14	65	Qualification for Play-Off
3	Real Madrid B	38	18	10	10	68	39	+29	64	Qualification for Play-Off
4	Racing Ferrol	38	20	4	14	61	39	+22	64	Qualification for Play-Off
5	Talavera	38	17	11	10	46	35	+11	62	
6	Mensajero	38	16	8	14	48	40	+8	56	
7	Sporting de Gijón B	38	15	11	12	46	48	−2	56	
8	Fuenlabrada	38	15	10	13	40	46	−6	55	
9	Avilés	38	14	9	15	48	40	+8	51	
10	Móstoles	38	11	18	9	40	43	−3	51	
11	Lugo	38	13	11	14	48	48	0	50	
12	Pontevedra	38	12	12	14	53	47	+6	48	
13	Oviedo B	38	12	11	15	42	51	−9	47	
14	SS Reyes	38	11	14	13	42	53	−11	47	
15	Pájara Playas	38	12	10	16	42	52	−10	46	
16	Caudal	38	9	16	13	33	46	−13	43	Qualification for Play-out
17	Deportivo de La Coruña B	38	9	14	15	42	47	−5	41	Relegation to 1999–2000 Tercera División
18	Langreo	38	11	7	20	34	60	−26	40	Relegation to 1999–2000 Tercera División
19	Lalín	38	9	10	19	35	52	−17	37	Relegation to 1999–2000 Tercera División
20	Lealtad	38	9	9	20	32	55	−23	36	Relegation to 1999–2000 Tercera División

Source: BDFútbol
Rules for classification: 1) points; 2) head-to-head points; 3) head-to-head goal difference; 4) head-to-head goals scored; 5) goal difference; 6) number of goals scored.

=== Results ===
Home \ Away	AVI	CAU	DEP	FUE	GET	LAL	LAN	LEA	LUG	MEN	MOS	OVI	PAJ	PNT	RFE	RMB	SSR	SPG	TAL	ULP
Real Avilés Ind.	—	2–0	1–2	0–1	1–4	0–1	4–1	1–1	0–1	2–2	2–1	2–0	1–0	2–2	2–0	1–1	5–0	3–0	2–1	0–1
Caudal	2–0	—	1–1	1–1	0–4	1–0	1–2	1–0	0–0	0–0	2–1	0–0	2–0	2–4	1–0	2–0	0–2	2–2	1–1	2–3
Deportivo B	0–1	1–1	—	0–1	1–0	4–0	3–0	2–1	2–2	1–1	1–1	1–1	2–0	0–0	1–2	1–1	1–1	0–1	1–2	1–1
Fuenlabrada	2–1	1–0	0–2	—	0–1	2–3	0–0	2–0	3–2	0–3	4–0	3–0	1–0	2–1	0–3	2–1	1–1	0–0	1–0	0–0
Getafe	1–0	1–0	2–0	1–0	—	2–0	2–1	0–1	2–1	1–2	2–0	2–0	2–0	2–1	2–1	1–2	0–0	4–0	0–1	1–0
Lalín	0–1	4–2	3–1	0–1	0–0	—	1–2	0–0	1–2	1–0	1–0	1–1	1–2	0–1	0–2	2–1	0–1	1–1	1–1	1–1
Lanzarote	0–4	2–0	1–0	0–2	1–1	0–3	—	2–0	0–0	0–3	0–0	1–0	1–2	2–2	2–0	1–0	3–0	0–1	3–1	0–1
Lealtad	1–0	1–1	4–1	2–2	0–0	1–3	0–1	—	1–0	2–0	1–1	0–0	4–0	0–2	1–0	1–1	1–3	0–3	2–0	0–0
Lugo	1–2	0–0	1–1	0–0	0–0	3–0	3–1	3–1	—	2–0	1–2	1–0	1–2	1–2	1–0	2–1	4–1	2–1	3–2	3–1
Mensajero	1–0	1–2	1–0	2–2	0–0	2–1	4–2	2–0	1–0	—	2–2	4–0	1–0	2–0	2–0	1–2	0–0	2–1	1–2	0–1
Móstoles	1–0	0–0	3–3	3–1	0–0	0–0	3–1	2–0	3–0	0–2	—	2–1	1–0	0–0	0–0	0–0	1–1	1–3	1–4	2–1
Oviedo B	2–2	0–0	0–0	2–0	0–2	1–1	2–0	3–0	2–2	1–2	2–2	—	3–0	4–3	2–0	2–1	1–2	0–1	1–0	2–1
Pájara Playas	2–1	0–0	2–0	6–1	1–1	1–1	2–0	3–1	1–1	3–1	1–1	2–2	—	1–0	1–2	2–6	0–0	1–1	2–2	1–1
Pontevedra	1–1	0–1	3–1	0–0	0–2	2–2	4–2	2–0	0–0	2–1	1–2	4–1	0–1	—	0–1	2–2	3–0	4–2	0–0	4–1
Racing Ferrol	0–0	2–1	3–0	2–1	1–2	2–0	3–0	4–1	4–2	3–2	1–2	4–0	2–0	2–0	—	3–4	2–0	5–1	1–2	0–0
Real Madrid B	3–1	4–1	0–3	1–2	2–0	3–0	0–0	3–1	4–0	3–0	0–0	3–1	4–0	2–0	1–2	—	2–1	4–1	0–0	0–0
San Sebast. Reyes	1–1	3–0	3–1	3–1	0–2	2–0	1–1	1–2	3–3	0–0	1–1	0–1	0–2	1–1	0–2	0–3	—	2–1	1–1	2–2
Sporting B	1–1	1–1	1–3	4–0	3–1	1–0	2–1	2–0	1–0	1–0	0–0	0–1	1–0	2–1	1–1	1–0	0–2	—	0–0	1–1
Talavera	0–1	1–1	1–0	0–0	1–1	4–2	1–0	2–1	1–0	2–0	3–0	1–0	1–0	1–1	2–1	0–1	2–0	2–1	—	0–1
Univ. Las Palmas	2–0	1–1	0–0	1–0	2–1	1–0	4–0	2–0	2–0	1–0	1–1	1–3	2–1	1–0	2–0	2–2	2–3	2–2	3–1	—

Source: BDFútbol
Legend: Blue = home team win; Yellow = draw; Red = away team win.

=== Top goalscorers ===
Goalscorers	Goals	Team
(Spain) Changui	21	Pontevedra
(Spain) Joseba Irazusta	19	Avilés
(Spain) David Soriano	14	Talavera
(Spain) Juan Uría	14	Lealtad
(Spain) Andrés Curiel	13	Getafe

=== Top goalkeepers ===
Goalkeeper	Goals	Matches	Average	Team
(Spain) Pablo Ancos	16	31	0.52	Getafe
(Spain) Santiago Lampón	24	30	0.8	Universidad de Las Pamas
(Spain) Alejandro Revuelta	33	38	0.87	Talavera
(Spain) Santi Calvo	29	30	0.97	Avilés
(Spain) Moisés Trujillo	34	34	1	Mensajero

== Group II ==
Teams from Aragon, Basque Country, Cantabria, Castile and León, Castilla–La Mancha, La Rioja and Navarre.

=== Teams ===
Location of teams in Segunda División B Gr. 2 1998–99

Team	Founded	Home city	Stadium
Amurrio	1949	Amurrio, Basque Country	Basarte
Athletic Bilbao B	1964	Bilbao, Basque Country	Lezama
Aurrerá Vitoria	1935	Vitoria, Basque Country	Olanrabe
Barakaldo	1917	Barakaldo, Basque Country	Lasesarre
Beasain	1905	Beasain, Basque Country	Loinaz
Bermeo	1950	Bermeo, Basque Country	Itxas Gane
Binéfar	1922	Binéfar, Aragon	Los Olmos
Burgos	1985	Burgos, Castile and León	El Plantío
Calahorra	1946	Calahorra, La Rioja	La Planilla
Conquense	1946	Cuenca, Castilla–La Mancha	La Fuensanta
Cultural Leonesa	1923	León, Castile and León	Puente Castro
Elgoibar	1917	Elgoibar, Basque Country	Mintxeta
Gernika	1922	Gernika, Basque Country	Urbieta
Gimnástica Torrelavega	1907	Torrelavega, Cantabria	El Malecón
Lemona	1923	Lemoa, Basque Country	Arlonagusia
Noja	1963	Noja, Cantabria	La Caseta
Osasuna B	1962	Aranguren, Navarre	Tajonar
Tropezón	1983	Torrelavega, Cantabria	Santa Ana
Valladolid B	1942	Valladolid, Castile and León	Ciudad Deportiva del Real Valladolid
Zaragoza B	1958	Zaragoza, Aragon	Ciudad Deportiva del Real Zaragoza

=== League Table ===
Pos	Team	Pld	W	D	L	GF	GA	GD	Pts	Qualification or relegation
1	Cultural Leonesa	38	22	6	10	51	37	+14	72	Qualification for Play-Off
2	Bermeo	38	20	10	8	49	35	+14	70	Qualification for Play-Off
3	Barakaldo	38	19	12	7	50	27	+23	69	Qualification for Play-Off
4	Burgos	38	18	12	8	44	24	+20	66	Qualification for Play-Off
5	Conquense	38	16	12	10	46	39	+7	60	
6	Athletic Bilbao B	38	17	8	13	54	36	+18	59	
7	Amurrio	38	14	14	10	47	38	+9	56	
8	Gimnástica de Torrelavega	38	14	11	13	39	44	−5	53	
9	Valladolid B	38	15	8	15	36	43	−7	53	
10	Osasuna B	38	13	11	14	34	30	+4	50	
11	Zaragoza B	38	12	13	13	43	47	−4	49	
12	Calahorra	38	13	9	16	35	36	−1	48	
13	Beasain	38	10	15	13	27	30	−3	45	
14	Gernika	38	11	12	15	43	48	−5	45	
15	Binéfar	38	9	17	12	35	38	−3	44	
16	Aurrerá	38	11	11	16	32	36	−4	44	Qualification for Play-out
17	Noja	38	11	11	16	33	49	−16	44	Relegation to 1999–2000 Tercera División
18	Lemona	38	9	11	18	32	43	−11	38	Relegation to 1999–2000 Tercera División
19	Tropezón	38	8	12	18	27	47	−20	36	Relegation to 1999–2000 Tercera División
20	Elgoibar	38	8	5	25	30	60	−30	29	Relegation to 1999–2000 Tercera División

Source: BDFútbol
Rules for classification: 1) points; 2) head-to-head points; 3) head-to-head goal difference; 4) head-to-head goals scored; 5) goal difference; 6) number of goals scored.

=== Results ===
Home \ Away	AMU	ATH	AUR	BAR	BEA	BER	BIN	BUR	CAL	CON	CUL	ELG	GER	GIM	LEM	NOJ	OSA	TRO	VLD	ZAR
Amurrio	—	4–2	2–0	1–1	0–0	0–1	0–0	1–0	0–2	2–0	1–1	3–1	0–0	2–0	2–1	6–0	1–0	1–1	0–0	2–3
Athletic B	1–2	—	1–0	2–1	0–1	0–0	1–0	1–1	1–3	3–1	2–1	4–0	2–2	1–0	2–0	0–1	1–0	4–0	1–2	1–2
Aurrerá Vitoria	1–1	1–1	—	2–1	1–0	0–1	1–1	0–2	2–0	0–1	0–1	3–2	3–0	0–0	0–1	2–0	1–1	1–0	1–2	2–0
Barakaldo	1–0	1–0	4–0	—	1–0	1–1	2–0	1–0	1–0	3–1	1–0	4–0	0–0	1–0	2–0	3–1	0–1	3–0	0–0	1–1
Beasain	0–0	1–1	0–0	1–0	—	2–4	0–0	1–1	1–0	1–0	1–1	1–0	1–1	0–1	3–1	0–0	0–0	2–2	1–0	1–2
Bermeo	1–3	2–2	0–2	0–1	1–0	—	2–1	1–0	1–0	1–0	1–0	2–1	2–1	1–1	0–0	4–0	2–0	1–0	3–0	2–0
Binéfar	2–1	1–2	1–0	1–1	0–0	2–2	—	0–1	0–0	1–1	1–2	4–1	1–3	3–1	3–0	2–1	1–0	0–0	3–0	0–0
Burgos	3–1	0–0	0–0	0–0	2–1	2–0	0–0	—	0–0	1–1	0–0	2–0	2–1	4–0	2–1	0–0	1–0	2–0	3–0	0–1
Calahorra	0–1	0–2	1–1	1–1	1–2	2–2	1–0	2–0	—	2–0	2–1	1–1	2–0	2–1	2–1	0–1	0–1	0–0	0–2	2–1
Conquense	3–1	2–1	1–0	1–0	1–0	3–0	3–0	0–2	1–0	—	0–0	1–0	0–0	3–1	0–0	0–1	0–0	3–2	2–2	2–1
Cultural Leonesa	2–1	1–0	2–1	4–1	1–0	2–1	0–0	1–2	3–1	0–0	—	1–0	2–1	3–0	2–1	3–2	0–2	2–1	0–1	1–0
Elgoibar	3–0	1–0	0–1	0–2	0–1	0–1	1–1	1–2	0–2	3–1	0–2	—	2–1	2–0	2–1	1–3	0–4	1–0	0–1	2–0
Gernika	2–0	0–2	2–1	2–2	0–0	0–1	1–1	0–1	0–1	2–2	1–0	2–1	—	1–2	2–1	2–0	2–0	1–3	3–1	1–1
Gim. Torrelavega	0–0	0–5	0–3	0–0	1–0	1–2	3–0	2–2	1–0	1–1	1–2	2–1	2–1	—	2–1	2–1	1–0	1–1	2–0	4–0
Lemona	1–1	0–2	3–0	0–1	1–0	3–1	0–0	2–1	1–1	2–4	3–0	1–0	0–1	1–1	—	0–1	0–0	0–0	2–1	1–1
Noja	0–0	1–1	0–0	2–1	1–1	1–1	3–2	1–3	0–1	2–0	1–2	1–1	1–4	0–2	0–1	—	1–1	0–1	3–0	0–0
Osasuna B	2–3	2–1	0–0	1–1	1–1	1–0	1–1	0–1	1–0	0–2	4–0	1–1	3–0	0–3	1–0	0–0	—	3–0	0–1	0–2
Tropezón	1–1	0–1	1–0	1–2	0–3	1–2	1–1	0–0	2–1	1–2	0–3	0–0	2–0	0–0	0–0	0–1	0–1	—	2–1	3–2
Valladolid B	0–1	1–3	2–1	2–2	2–0	1–1	2–0	2–0	1–0	1–1	1–2	2–0	1–1	0–0	1–0	1–2	0–1	1–0	—	1–0
Zaragoza B	2–2	1–0	1–1	1–2	2–0	1–1	0–1	2–1	2–2	2–2	2–3	2–1	2–2	0–0	1–1	1–0	2–1	0–1	2–0	—

Source: BDFútbol
Legend: Blue = home team win; Yellow = draw; Red = away team win.

=== Top goalscorers ===
Goalscorers	Goals	Team
(Spain) José Manuel Redondo	17	Zaragoza B
(Spain) Julen Castellano	14	Aurrerá
(Spain) David Karanka	12	Bilbao Athletic
(Brazil) Armindo Rubbin	11	Cultural Leonesa
(Spain) Asier Garitano	11	Burgos

=== Top goalkeepers ===
Goalkeeper	Goals	Matches	Average	Team
(Spain) José Andrés Duro	22	35	0.63	Burgos
(Spain) Alfonso Núñez	27	36	0.75	Beasain
(Spain) Javier Rasche	31	36	0.86	Bermeo
(Spain) Daniel Aranzubia	29	33	0.88	Bilbao Athletic
(Spain) Iban Triviño	27	30	0.9	Aurrerá

== Group III ==
Teams from Catalonia, Region of Murcia and Valencian Community.

=== Teams ===
Location of teams in Segunda División B Gr. 3 1998–99

Team	Founded	Home city	Stadium
Águilas	1925	Águilas, Region of Murcia	El Rubial
Benidorm	1964	Benidorm, Valencian Community	Foietes
Cartagonova	1995	Cartagena, Region of Murcia	Cartagonova
Castellón	1922	Castellón de la Plana, Valencian Community	Nou Castàlia
Elche	1922	Elche, Valencian Community	Manuel Martínez Valero
Espanyol B	1994	Barcelona, Catalonia	Parc del Migdia / Montjuïc
Figueres	1919	Figueres, Catalonia	Vilatenim
Gandía	1947	Gandia, Valencian Community	Guillermo Olagüe
Gavà	1929	Gavà, Catalonia	La Bòbila
Gimnàstic de Tarragona	1886	Tarragona, Catalonia	Nou Estadi Tarragona
Gramenet	1994	Santa Coloma de Gramenet, Catalonia	Nou Camp Municipal
Hospitalet	1957	L'Hospitalet de Llobregat, Catalonia	Municipal de Deportes
Levante	1909	Valencia, Valencian Community	Nou Estadi del Llevant
Murcia	1919	Murcia, Region of Murcia	La Condomina
Ontinyent	1931	Ontinyent, Valencian Community	El Clariano
Palamós	1898	Palamós, Catalonia	Nou Estadi
Sabadell	1903	Sabadell, Catalonia	Nova Creu Alta
Terrassa	1906	Terrassa, Catalonia	Olímpic de Terrassa
Valencia B	1944	Valencia, Valencian Community	Ciudad Deportiva de Paterna
Yeclano	1950	Yecla, Region of Murcia	La Constitución

=== League Table ===
Pos	Team	Pld	W	D	L	GF	GA	GD	Pts	Qualification or relegation
1	Levante	38	22	10	6	54	22	+32	76	Qualification for Play-Off
2	Cartagonova	38	20	11	7	54	29	+25	71	Qualification for Play-Off
3	Elche	38	18	13	7	47	23	+24	67	Qualification for Play-Off
4	Murcia	38	18	10	10	59	43	+16	64	Qualification for Play-Off
5	Terrassa	38	15	15	8	54	39	+15	60	
6	Gramenet	38	15	13	10	42	33	+9	58	
7	Sabadell	38	16	7	15	42	46	−4	55	
8	Figueres	38	14	11	13	43	38	+5	53	
9	Castellón	38	13	13	12	42	38	+4	52	
10	Valencia B	38	14	9	15	56	47	+9	51	
11	Gandía	38	13	10	15	41	40	+1	49	
12	Hospitalet	38	14	5	19	46	57	−11	47	
13	Yeclano	38	11	13	14	41	43	−2	46	
14	Ontinyent	38	11	12	15	32	44	−12	45	
15	Águilas	38	12	9	17	37	58	−21	45	
16	Gimnàstic	38	11	11	16	45	50	−5	44	Qualification for Play-out
17	Espanyol B	38	12	7	19	41	55	−14	43	Relegation to 1999–2000 Tercera División
18	Benidorm	38	9	16	13	27	36	−9	43	Relegation to 1999–2000 Tercera División
19	Palamós	38	10	10	18	34	57	−23	40	Relegation to 1999–2000 Tercera División
20	Gavà	38	4	11	23	35	74	−39	23	Relegation to 1999–2000 Tercera División

Source: BDFutbol
Rules for classification: 1) points; 2) head-to-head points; 3) head-to-head goal difference; 4) head-to-head goals scored; 5) goal difference; 6) number of goals scored.

=== Results ===
Home \ Away	AGU	BEN	CAR	CAS	ELC	ESP	FIG	GAN	GAV	GIM	GRA	HOS	LEV	MUR	ONT	PAL	SAB	TER	VAL	YEC
Águilas	—	0–0	2–1	1–0	0–1	4–1	1–0	0–1	1–1	3–1	2–1	1–3	0–2	1–1	0–1	1–0	2–1	1–1	2–1	2–5
Benidorm	3–2	—	0–2	0–2	1–0	0–2	0–1	1–0	2–1	0–0	0–0	1–2	0–0	0–0	0–0	0–2	3–0	0–1	2–1	1–0
Cartagonova	4–0	1–1	—	1–0	0–0	2–1	3–1	1–0	5–1	1–0	1–0	3–2	2–1	0–0	2–0	2–1	2–0	0–0	1–0	1–1
Castellón	0–0	0–0	0–0	—	1–1	1–2	1–0	3–1	1–1	1–2	1–1	4–1	0–3	1–2	2–0	1–1	1–0	1–1	2–0	0–1
Elche	3–0	0–0	3–0	0–0	—	2–0	3–1	2–1	3–1	2–0	0–0	2–0	2–2	3–0	1–0	0–0	2–0	1–2	1–2	2–0
Espanyol B	1–0	2–2	0–4	2–1	0–1	—	0–0	0–1	1–1	0–2	0–3	5–1	0–2	2–2	1–0	3–0	3–0	1–0	0–2	2–0
Figueres	4–1	0–2	1–1	1–1	0–0	2–1	—	3–1	2–0	3–1	0–0	0–1	0–1	2–1	1–0	1–1	1–1	1–0	1–0	2–0
Gandía	0–0	1–1	1–3	0–2	0–0	2–0	3–0	—	2–1	2–0	2–2	4–0	0–0	2–3	0–0	2–1	0–0	0–1	1–2	1–0
Gavà	0–2	1–2	2–1	2–2	0–2	1–1	1–6	3–4	—	0–3	1–1	2–0	1–3	1–1	0–1	0–0	0–1	0–2	2–2	2–1
Gimnàstic	1–1	0–0	0–2	1–1	1–0	0–1	2–1	0–0	4–4	—	0–1	2–5	1–1	1–0	2–2	2–2	0–1	0–1	2–2	4–0
Gramenet	0–0	2–0	1–1	1–0	1–0	0–2	0–0	1–0	2–0	3–2	—	4–0	1–0	0–1	1–1	2–0	3–1	0–1	2–3	1–1
Hospitalet	4–1	1–0	0–1	0–1	0–1	1–0	2–1	1–1	2–0	0–1	1–2	—	1–0	2–2	1–0	0–0	2–0	3–0	0–0	1–3
Levante	1–0	1–1	1–1	1–0	2–2	2–1	2–0	1–0	0–2	1–0	4–1	1–0	—	2–0	3–0	2–1	1–0	1–1	2–0	2–0
Murcia	1–2	1–1	0–1	6–1	3–0	2–0	3–2	2–0	2–0	2–0	3–0	3–1	2–0	—	4–3	1–0	1–3	2–3	1–0	2–0
Ontinyent	2–0	1–1	1–0	2–1	2–1	1–0	0–0	0–0	2–0	1–0	0–0	2–4	1–1	1–1	—	1–3	2–4	0–0	0–4	1–0
Palamós	0–1	2–0	2–1	1–2	0–1	2–2	1–2	3–1	1–0	2–0	0–1	2–1	0–5	0–0	1–3	—	2–1	1–1	2–1	0–3
Sabadell	3–0	2–1	2–0	1–3	1–1	1–1	0–1	0–3	3–1	1–4	2–1	2–0	0–2	2–0	1–0	2–0	—	1–0	2–1	1–1
Terrassa	4–1	1–1	2–1	0–1	0–2	6–2	1–1	1–2	2–1	1–3	1–1	3–3	0–0	1–1	2–0	5–0	0–0	—	2–1	3–3
Valencia B	3–0	2–0	1–1	0–2	2–2	2–1	1–1	2–1	4–1	1–1	0–1	1–0	0–1	1–2	2–1	6–0	1–1	1–3	—	2–1
Yeclano	2–2	2–0	1–1	1–1	0–0	2–0	1–0	0–1	0–0	1–2	2–1	1–0	1–0	4–1	0–0	0–0	0–1	1–1	2–2	—

Source: BDFutbol
Legend: Blue = home team win; Yellow = draw; Red = away team win.

=== Top goalscorers ===
Goalscorers	Goals	Team
(Argentina) Daniel Aquino	18	Murcia
(Spain) Keko Martínez	16	Cartagena
(Spain) Peri	16	L'Hospitalet
(Spain) Santi Castillejo	15	Castellón
(Spain) Enric Cuxart	14	Murcia

=== Top goalkeepers ===
Goalkeeper	Goals	Matches	Average	Team
(Cape Verde) José Veiga	22	38	0.58	Levante
(Spain) Iñaki Lafuente	23	37	0.62	Elche
(Spain) José Trujillo	29	37	0.78	Cartagena
(Spain) Antonio Morales	31	36	0.86	Gramenet
(Spain) Javi Oliva	31	35	0.89	Terrassa

== Group IV ==
Teams from Andalusia, Castilla–La Mancha, Ceuta, Extremadura and Melilla.

=== Teams ===
Location of teams in Segunda División B Gr. 4 1998–99

Team	Founded	Home city	Stadium
Algeciras	1909	Algeciras, Andalusia	El Mirador
Almería CF	1989	Almería, Andalusia	Juan Rojas
CP Almería	1983	Almería, Andalusia	Juan Rojas
Betis B	1962	Seville, Andalusia	Ciudad Deportiva Ruíz de Lopera
Cacereño	1919	Cáceres, Extremadura	Príncipe Felipe
Cádiz	1910	Cádiz, Andalusia	Ramón de Carranza
Ceuta	1996	Ceuta	Alfonso Murube
Córdoba	1954	Córdoba, Andalusia	Nuevo Arcángel
Écija	1939	Écija, Andalusia	San Pablo
Granada	1931	Granada, Andalusia	Nuevo Los Cármenes
Isla Cristina	1934	Isla Cristina, Andalusia	Municipal de Isla Cristina
Jaén	1922	Jaén, Andalusia	La Victoria
Jerez	1969	Jerez de los Caballeros, Extremadura	Manuel Calzado Galván
Manchego	1929	Ciudad Real, Castilla–La Mancha	Príncipe Juan Carlos
Melilla	1976	Melilla	Álvarez Claro
Moralo	1923	Navalmoral de la Mata, Extremadura	Municipal de Deportes
Motril	1984	Motril, Andalusia	Escribano Castilla
Plasencia	1940	Plasencia, Extremadura	Ciudad Deportiva de Plasencia
Sevilla B	1950	Seville, Andalusia	Viejo Nervión
Xerez	1947	Jerez de la Frontera, Andalusia	Chapín

=== League Table ===
Pos	Team	Pld	W	D	L	GF	GA	GD	Pts	Qualification or relegation
1	Melilla	38	20	9	9	42	25	+17	69	Qualification for Play-Off
2	Sevilla B	38	21	5	12	53	31	+22	68	Qualification for Play-Off
3	Córdoba	38	18	13	7	64	35	+29	67	Qualification for Play-Off
4	Polideportivo Almería	38	18	13	7	45	20	+25	67	Qualification for Play-Off
5	Cádiz	38	18	10	10	47	34	+13	64	
6	Granada	38	17	13	8	51	35	+16	64	
7	Ceuta	38	16	13	9	54	36	+18	61	
8	Jaén	38	15	13	10	40	34	+6	58	
9	Betis B	38	17	5	16	59	52	+7	56	
10	Motril	38	15	10	13	38	36	+2	55	
11	Xerez	38	16	7	15	43	38	+5	55	
12	Jerez	38	15	9	14	51	34	+17	54	
13	Manchego	38	13	9	16	32	32	0	48	
14	Cacereño	38	11	14	13	42	42	0	47	
15	Écija	38	12	11	15	36	41	−5	47	
16	Algeciras	38	12	10	16	38	35	+3	46	Qualification for Play-out
17	Plasencia	38	10	10	18	33	51	−18	40	Relegation to 1999–2000 Tercera División
18	Almería	38	8	16	14	45	40	+5	40	Relegation to 1999–2000 Tercera División
19	Moralo	38	8	7	23	41	65	−24	31	Relegation to 1999–2000 Tercera División
20	Isla Cristina	38	1	1	36	12	150	−138	4	Relegation to 1999–2000 Tercera División

Source: BDFutbol
Rules for classification: 1) points; 2) head-to-head points; 3) head-to-head goal difference; 4) head-to-head goals scored; 5) goal difference; 6) number of goals scored.

=== Results ===
Home \ Away	ALG	ACF	CPA	BET	CAC	CAD	CEU	COR	ECI	GRA	ICR	JAE	JER	MAN	MEL	MOR	MOT	PLA	SEV	XER
Algeciras	—	0–1	0–0	1–2	1–0	0–1	0–0	0–0	1–0	0–0	5–0	0–0	2–0	0–2	1–2	2–1	2–3	0–0	1–0	0–2
Almería CF	1–1	—	0–1	2–3	4–0	0–1	1–2	2–2	0–1	0–0	5–1	0–0	0–0	0–1	1–1	3–0	0–0	0–2	0–3	0–0
CP Almería	1–0	1–0	—	1–0	3–0	1–4	2–0	1–1	1–0	1–1	2–0	3–1	0–0	1–0	2–0	3–0	1–0	0–0	0–1	0–2
Betis B	2–0	1–0	1–4	—	0–1	1–1	2–4	2–0	1–3	0–2	8–0	1–1	1–4	3–0	3–1	2–0	2–1	5–2	1–3	3–0
Cacereño	2–1	1–1	0–0	2–1	—	1–0	1–1	0–0	3–1	1–1	9–0	1–2	2–0	1–1	1–2	0–0	1–0	1–0	1–0	2–2
Cádiz	1–1	1–4	1–2	1–1	3–1	—	0–0	1–1	0–1	0–0	1–0	3–1	2–0	0–0	0–1	1–2	1–1	1–1	3–1	4–0
Ceuta	1–0	2–2	0–0	2–0	1–1	0–1	—	1–0	2–0	4–2	8–0	1–2	0–3	3–1	0–0	1–1	1–1	2–0	0–0	4–1
Córdoba	2–1	2–2	0–0	3–0	1–1	0–1	4–2	—	3–1	1–1	7–0	2–1	3–2	1–2	0–1	3–0	3–1	2–2	0–2	2–0
Écija	2–1	0–0	2–1	2–1	0–0	1–2	1–2	1–1	—	1–1	3–0	2–3	3–1	1–0	0–2	0–1	1–0	1–0	0–0	0–0
Granada	1–2	3–2	1–0	0–0	0–0	1–2	1–2	1–2	2–0	—	6–0	1–2	2–1	2–1	1–0	4–3	3–0	2–0	1–0	2–1
Isla Cristina	0–7	0–5	0–8	0–2	0–5	0–2	1–1	0–4	0–2	0–2	—	1–2	0–2	1–2	0–1	1–3	0–1	1–3	2–3	0–7
Jaén	2–0	1–1	0–0	0–0	2–1	0–1	0–0	2–3	1–0	0–0	3–0	—	1–2	0–0	1–0	2–1	0–1	1–1	0–2	2–1
Jerez	0–1	1–1	0–0	1–0	2–1	1–1	2–0	0–0	1–1	4–0	6–0	0–0	—	2–0	0–0	3–0	2–1	4–0	5–0	0–1
Manchego	0–1	2–0	0–0	5–1	1–1	0–1	2–0	0–1	1–1	0–0	3–0	0–1	0–1	—	1–0	1–0	0–1	0–0	2–0	0–2
Melilla	2–2	0–0	0–0	0–2	3–0	1–0	1–0	1–1	3–1	3–0	3–2	2–1	2–0	1–0	—	1–1	2–0	3–1	0–0	1–0
Moralo	1–2	0–3	0–2	1–2	1–0	1–2	2–2	0–5	1–0	1–1	8–0	1–2	2–0	0–1	0–1	—	0–0	3–1	2–4	0–2
Motril	1–2	4–1	1–1	1–0	0–0	3–0	1–0	0–1	2–2	0–0	3–0	1–1	1–0	1–2	0–1	2–1	—	2–0	0–4	1–0
Plasencia	0–0	1–0	2–0	0–2	2–0	2–0	0–1	0–2	1–1	0–2	1–2	0–2	2–0	2–1	1–0	1–1	1–2	—	2–2	2–1
Sevilla B	1–0	1–1	0–1	2–1	4–0	1–0	0–2	3–0	2–0	1–2	2–0	1–0	2–0	2–0	1–0	2–1	0–1	3–0	—	0–1
Xerez	1–0	0–2	2–1	1–2	1–0	2–3	0–2	0–1	0–0	0–2	5–0	0–0	2–1	0–0	1–0	3–1	0–0	1–0	1–0	—

Source: BDFutbol
Legend: Blue = home team win; Yellow = draw; Red = away team win.

=== Top goalscorers ===
Goalscorers	Goals	Team
(Spain) Fali Montes	19	Melilla
(Spain) Julio Pineda	18	Écija
(Spain) José Luis Loreto	15	Córdoba
(Spain) Vicente Borge	15	Cádiz
(Spain) Israel González	15	Jerez

=== Top goalkeepers ===
Goalkeeper	Goals	Matches	Average	Team
(Spain) José Carlos Burgos	11	30	0.37	Polideportivo Almería
(Spain) Carlos Gaitán	22	37	0.59	Melilla
(Spain) Laureano Echevarría	21	29	0.72	Algeciras
(Spain) Pablo Manzano	25	33	0.76	Ceuta
(Spain) José Antonio Luque	29	35	0.83	Sevilla Atlético

== Play-offs ==
=== Group A ===
Pos	Team	Pld	W	D	L	GF	GA	GD	Pts	Promotion
1	Elche (P)	6	3	3	0	7	4	+3	12	Promoted to Segunda División
2	Universidad de Las Pamas	6	1	4	1	5	5	0	7	
3	Burgos	6	2	1	3	7	7	0	7	
4	Melilla	6	1	2	3	3	6	−3	5	

Source: futbolme
Rules for classification: 1) points; 2) head-to-head points; 3) head-to-head goal difference; 4) head-to-head goals scored; 5) goal difference; 6) number of goals scored.
(P) Promoted

=== Group B ===
Pos	Team	Pld	W	D	L	GF	GA	GD	Pts	Promotion
1	Getafe (P)	6	4	2	0	11	5	+6	14	Promoted to Segunda División
2	Barakaldo	6	3	2	1	11	6	+5	11	
3	Murcia	6	1	2	3	6	8	−2	5	
4	Sevilla Atlético	6	1	0	5	5	14	−9	3	

Source: futbolme
Rules for classification: 1) points; 2) head-to-head points; 3) head-to-head goal difference; 4) head-to-head goals scored; 5) goal difference; 6) number of goals scored.
(P) Promoted

=== Group C ===
Pos	Team	Pld	W	D	L	GF	GA	GD	Pts	Promotion
1	Levante (P)	6	4	2	0	15	6	+9	14	Promoted to Segunda División
2	Real Madrid B	6	1	4	1	6	6	0	7	
3	Polideportivo Almería	6	1	3	2	10	12	−2	6	
4	Bermeo	6	1	1	4	11	18	−7	4	

Source: futbolme
Rules for classification: 1) points; 2) head-to-head points; 3) head-to-head goal difference; 4) head-to-head goals scored; 5) goal difference; 6) number of goals scored.
(P) Promoted

=== Group D ===
Pos	Team	Pld	W	D	L	GF	GA	GD	Pts	Promotion
1	Córdoba (P)	6	4	0	2	7	7	0	12	Promoted to Segunda División
2	Cartagena	6	3	1	2	6	5	+1	10	
3	Racing Ferrol	6	2	1	3	8	5	+3	7	
4	Cultural Leonesa	6	2	0	4	4	8	−4	6	

Source: futbolme
Rules for classification: 1) points; 2) head-to-head points; 3) head-to-head goal difference; 4) head-to-head goals scored; 5) goal difference; 6) number of goals scored.
(P) Promoted

== Play-out ==
=== Semifinal ===
Team 1	Agg.	Team 2	1st leg	2nd leg
Caudal	0–2	Gimnàstic	0–0	0–2
Aurrerá	4–2	Algeciras	3–0	1–2

=== Final ===
Team 1	Agg.	Team 2	1st leg	2nd leg
Caudal	2–1	Algeciras	2–0	0–1
