= SD Compostela B =

Spanish football club

Compostela B
- Full name: Sociedad Deportiva Compostela "B"
- Nickname: Compos B
- Founded: 1948 (as Vista Alegre SD); 2006 (Zona Vella CF)
- Dissolved: 2023
- Ground: Santa Isabel, Santiago de Compostela, Galicia, Spain
- Capacity: 1,200
- President: Antonio Quinteiro
- Head coach: Francisco Raviña
- 2022–23: 2ª Autonómica – Santiago de Compostela Group 2, 13th of 18
- Website: https://www.sdcompostela.com/
Home colours	Away colours

Sociedad Deportiva Compostela "B" was a Spanish football team based in Santiago de Compostela, in the autonomous community of Galicia. It was the reserve team of SD Compostela.

== History ==
Vista Alegre Sociedad Deportiva was founded in 1948, and first reached Tercera División in 1980. In 1997, the club was incorporated into SD Compostela's structure, being renamed into Sociedad Deportiva Compostela B and becoming their reserve team.

Compostela B ceased activities in 2004, with the main club being under severe financial crisis. In 2007, SD Campus Stellae (a club founded in 2004 to honour Compostela's history) was "renamed" into SD Compostela; despite the first team was moved to Preferente Autonómica de Galicia (fifth tier), Campus Stellae still existed in the Terceira Autonómica de Galicia for two seasons, being the reserve side of Compostela before ceasing activities in 2009.

In 2017, Compostela signed an agreement with Zona Vella Club de Fútbol (founded in 2006) to become their reserve team; in 2019, Zona Vella was renamed into SD Compostela B.

In 2021, after Sigüeiro FC became the reserve team of Compostela, Compostela B became the second reserve team. Two years later, the club closed the B-side and kept Sigüeiro as their only reserve side.

== Season to season ==
=== Vista Alegre ===
Season	Tier	Division	Place	Copa del Rey
1973–74	5	1ª Reg.	4th	
1974–75	5	2ª Reg.	1st	
1975–76	4	Serie A	13th	
1976–77	4	Serie A	7th	
1977–78	5	Serie A	14th	
1978–79	5	Reg. Pref.	4th	
1979–80	5	Reg. Pref.	1st	
1980–81	4	3ª	6th	
1981–82	4	3ª	8th	First round
1982–83	4	3ª	11th	
1983–84	4	3ª	17th	
1984–85	4	3ª	13th	

Season	Tier	Division	Place	Copa del Rey
1985–86	4	3ª	12th	
1986–87	4	3ª	9th	
1987–88	4	3ª	15th	
1988–89	4	3ª	11th	
1989–90	4	3ª	20th	
1990–91	5	Reg. Pref.	7th	
1991–92	5	Reg. Pref.	6th	
1992–93	5	Reg. Pref.	11th	
1993–94	5	Reg. Pref.	2nd	
1994–95	5	Reg. Pref.	5th	
1995–96	5	Reg. Pref.	1st	
1996–97	4	3ª	1st	

- 11 seasons in Tercera División

=== Compostela B (1997–2004) ===
Season	Tier	Division	Place
1997–98	4	3ª	1st
1998–99	4	3ª	6th
1999–2000	4	3ª	6th
2000–01	4	3ª	6th
2001–02	4	3ª	1st
2002–03	4	3ª	6th
2003–04	4	3ª	7th

- 7 seasons in Tercera División

=== Campus Stellae ===
Season	Tier	Division	Place
2007–08	8	3ª Aut.	10th
2008–09	8	3ª Aut.	8th

=== Zona Vella ===
Season	Tier	Division	Place	Copa del Rey
2006–07	8	3ª Aut.	7th	
2007–08	8	3ª Aut.	2nd	
2008–09	7	2ª Aut.	18th	
2009–10	8	3ª Aut.	7th	
2010–11	8	3ª Aut.	1st	
2011–12	7	2ª Aut.	10th	
2012–13	7	2ª Aut.	16th	
2013–14	8	3ª Aut.	3rd	
2014–15	8	3ª Aut.	15th	
2015–16	8	3ª Aut.	1st	
2016–17	7	2ª Aut.	10th	
2017–18	7	2ª Aut.	9th	
2018–19	7	2ª Aut.	12th	

=== Compostela B ===
Season	Tier	Division	Place
2019–20	7	2ª Aut.	6th
2020–21	DNP		
2021–22	8	2ª Aut.	3rd
2022–23	8	2ª Aut.	13th
