= CD Calahorra =

Spanish football team

Coordinates: 42.303362°N 1.975573°W

Calahorra
- Full name: Club Deportivo Calahorra
- Nickname: Rojillos
- Founded: 1946; 80 years ago
- Ground: La Planilla, Calahorra, La Rioja, Spain
- Capacity: 5,000
- President: Tomás Lorente
- Head coach: Carlos Pouso
- League: Tercera Federación – Group 16
- 2025–26: Tercera Federación – Group 15, 4th of 18
Home colours	Away colours

Club Deportivo Calahorra is a Spanish football team based in Calahorra, in the autonomous community of La Rioja. Founded in 1946 it plays in Tercera Federación – Group 16, holding home games at the Estadio Municipal La Planilla, with a capacity of 5,000 spectators.

== History ==
In 2003–04 season, the club was relegated from Segunda División B to Tercera.

== Season to season ==
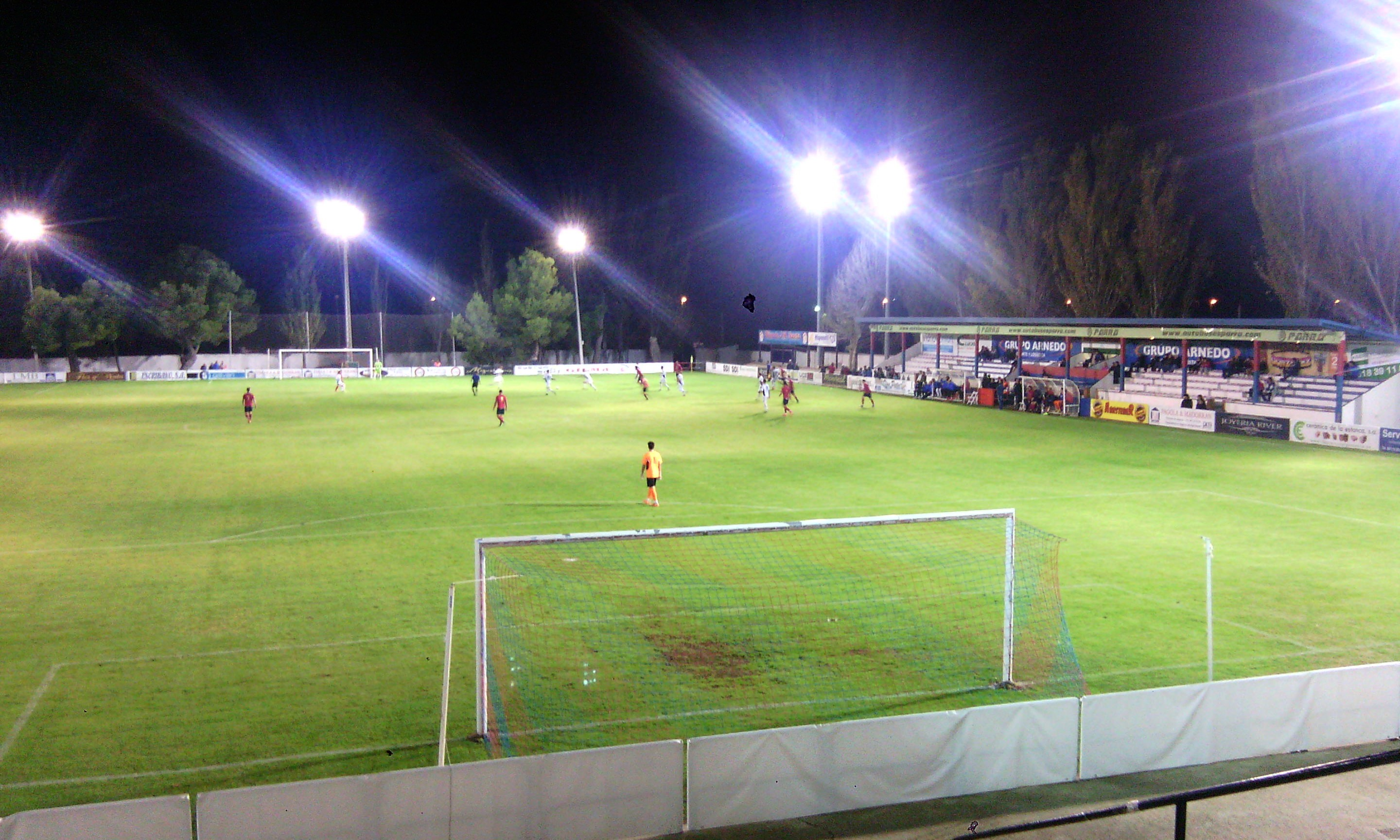
Estadio La Planilla.

Season	Tier	Division	Place	Copa del Rey
1947–48	5	2ª Reg.		
1948–49	4	1ª Reg.	1st	
1949–50	3	3ª	16th	
1950–51	3	3ª	8th	
1951–52	3	3ª	14th	
1952–53	3	3ª	18th	
1953–54	4	1ª Reg.	2nd	
1954–55	3	3ª	9th	
1955–56	3	3ª	5th	
1956–57	3	3ª	6th	
1957–58	3	3ª	15th	
1958–59	4	1ª Reg.	2nd	
1959–60	4	1ª Reg.	3rd	
1960–61	4	1ª Reg.	8th	
1961–62	3	3ª	15th	
1962–63	4	1ª Reg.	3rd	
1963–64	4	1ª Reg.	4th	
1964–65	3	3ª	11th	
1965–66	3	3ª	6th	
1966–67	3	3ª	6th	

Season	Tier	Division	Place	Copa del Rey
1967–68	3	3ª	9th	
1968–69	3	3ª	17th	
1969–70	3	3ª	14th	First round
1970–71	4	1ª Reg.	3rd	
1971–72	4	1ª Reg.	11th	
1972–73	4	1ª Reg.	15th	
1973–74	4	1ª Reg.	1st	
1974–75	3	3ª	18th	First round
1975–76	4	Reg. Pref.	1st	
1976–77	3	3ª	18th	Third round
1977–78	4	3ª	6th	First round
1978–79	4	3ª	19th	First round
1979–80	4	3ª	5th	Second round
1980–81	4	3ª	14th	First round
1981–82	4	3ª	11th	
1982–83	4	3ª	15th	
1983–84	4	3ª	4th	
1984–85	4	3ª	14th	First round
1985–86	4	3ª	19th	
1986–87	4	3ª	4th	

Season	Tier	Division	Place	Copa del Rey
1987–88	4	3ª	1st	First round
1988–89	3	2ª B	13th	
1989–90	3	2ª B	19th	
1990–91	4	3ª	9th	First round
1991–92	4	3ª	1st	
1992–93	4	3ª	2nd	Third round
1993–94	4	3ª	3rd	
1994–95	4	3ª	1st	
1995–96	4	3ª	1st	
1996–97	4	3ª	6th	
1997–98	4	3ª	1st	
1998–99	3	2ª B	12th	First round
1999–2000	3	2ª B	9th	
2000–01	3	2ª B	3rd	
2001–02	3	2ª B	12th	First round
2002–03	3	2ª B	16th	
2003–04	3	2ª B	18th	
2004–05	4	3ª	1st	
2005–06	4	3ª	4th	Preliminary
2006–07	4	3ª	3rd	

Season	Tier	Division	Place	Copa del Rey
2007–08	4	3ª	4th	
2008–09	4	3ª	4th	
2009–10	4	3ª	5th	
2010–11	4	3ª	9th	
2011–12	4	3ª	9th	
2012–13	4	3ª	3rd	
2013–14	4	3ª	8th	
2014–15	4	3ª	2nd	
2015–16	4	3ª	1st	
2016–17	4	3ª	1st	Second round
2017–18	4	3ª	1st	Third round
2018–19	3	2ª B	10th	Third round
2019–20	3	2ª B	12th	
2020–21	3	2ª B	2nd / 4th	First round
2021–22	3	1ª RFEF	11th	
2022–23	3	1ª Fed.	19th	
2023–24	4	2ª Fed.	10th	
2024–25	4	2ª Fed.	14th	
2025–26	5	3ª Fed.	4th	
2026–27	5	3ª Fed.		

- 2 seasons in Primera Federación/Primera División RFEF
- 11 seasons in Segunda División B
- 2 seasons in Segunda Federación
- 50 seasons in Tercera División
- 2 seasons in Tercera Federación

== Current squad ==
As of 8 February 2024.

Note: Flags indicate national team as defined under FIFA eligibility rules; some limited exceptions apply. Players may hold more than one non-FIFA nationality.

No.	Pos.	Nation	Player
1	GK	ESP	Miguel Martínez (captain)
2	DF	ESP	Raúl Sola
3	DF	ESP	Rubén Cantero (on loan from Barça B)
4	DF	ESP	Ekhi Senar
5	DF	ESP	Xabier Zaldua
7	MF	ESP	Eneko Capilla
8	MF	ESP	Iván Castillo
9	FW	ESP	Kevin Soeiro
10	MF	ESP	Julen Ekiza
11	DF	ESP	Miguel Santos
12	FW	ESP	Iker Hernández

No.	Pos.	Nation	Player
13	GK	ESP	Álvaro González
14	FW	ESP	Aitor Uzkudun
15	DF	ESP	Simón Lecea
17	MF	FRA	Baba Cissé
18	DF	ESP	Pablo Bolado
19	FW	ESP	Raúl Rubio
20	DF	ESP	Nacho Ruiz
21	FW	ESP	Jorge Domínguez
22	GK	ESP	Juan Carlos Azón
23	MF	ESP	Oier Herrera
27	DF	ESP	Aratz Barandiarán

== See also ==
- CD Calahorra B, reserve team

== Honours ==
- Tercera División
  - Champions (9): 1987–88, 1991–92, 1994–95, 1995–96, 1997–98, 2004–05, 2015–16, 2016–17, 2017–18
