= Benidorm CF =

Spanish football club

- Full name: Benidorm Club de Fútbol
- Founded: 1964
- Dissolved: 2011
- Ground: Guillermo Amor, Benidorm, Valencia, Spain
- Capacity: 6,000
Home colours	Away colours	Third colours

Benidorm Club de Fútbol was a Spanish football team based in Benidorm, in the autonomous community of Valencia. Founded in 1964 and dissolved in 2011 it held home matches at Estadio Municipal Guillermo Amor, which had a capacity of 6,000.

== History ==
Benidorm was folded in June 2011, 47 years after its creation. Liquidation befell due to the high debt generated during past seasons with their players and suppliers.

The club spent 19 seasons in the third division, with two separate seven-year runs in the competition, one in the 90s and another in the 2000s.

== Honours ==
Tercera División

- Winners (1): 1988–89

== Season to season ==
Season	Tier	Division	Place	Copa del Rey
1964–65	5	2ª Reg.		
1965–66	4	1ª Reg.	1st	
1966–67	3	3ª	5th	
1967–68	3	3ª	7th	
1968–69	3	3ª	9th	
1969–70	3	3ª	17th	
1970–71	4	1ª Reg.	19th	
1971–72	5	2ª Reg.	16th	
1972–73	5	2ª Reg.	1st	
1973–74	4	Reg. Pref.	12th	
1974–75	4	Reg. Pref.	4th	
1975–76	4	Reg. Pref.	18th	
1976–77	4	Reg. Pref.	6th	
1977–78	5	Reg. Pref.	2nd	
1978–79	5	Reg. Pref.	11th	
1979–80	5	Reg. Pref.	5th	
1980–81	5	Reg. Pref.	10th	
1981–82	5	Reg. Pref.	3rd	
1982–83	4	3ª	6th	
1983–84	4	3ª	15th	First round

Season	Tier	Division	Place	Copa del Rey
1984–85	4	3ª	4th	
1985–86	4	3ª	9th	First round
1986–87	4	3ª	4th	
1987–88	3	2ª B	18th	First round
1988–89	4	3ª	1st	First round
1989–90	3	2ª B	5th	
1990–91	3	2ª B	10th	Fourth round
1991–92	3	2ª B	13th	Round of 16
1992–93	3	2ª B	8th	First round
1993–94	3	2ª B	8th	Second round
1994–95	3	2ª B	14th	Second round
1995–96	3	2ª B	16th	
1996–97	3	2ª B	18th	
1997–98	4	3ª	2nd	
1998–99	3	2ª B	18th	Round of 16
1999–2000	4	3ª	3rd	
2000–01	3	2ª B	14th	
2001–02	3	2ª B	17th	
2002–03	4	3ª	1st	
2003–04	4	3ª	1st	First round

Season	Tier	Division	Place	Copa del Rey
2004–05	3	2ª B	12th	First round
2005–06	3	2ª B	7th	
2006–07	3	2ª B	9th	Second round
2007–08	3	2ª B	4th	
2008–09	3	2ª B	14th	Round of 32
2009–10	3	2ª B	6th	
2010–11	3	2ª B	16th	First round

- 19 seasons in Segunda División B
- 14 seasons in Tercera División
