= Bermeo FT =

Coordinates: 43.4232°N 2.7246°W

Bermeo
- Full name: Bermeo Futbol Taldea
- Nickname: Txo
- Founded: 1950
- Ground: Itxas Gane, Bermeo, Basque Country, Spain
- Capacity: 3,000
- President: Juan Mari Abio
- Head coach: José Luaces
- League: División de Honor
- 2024–25: División de Honor, 5th of 18
Home colours	Away colours

Bermeo Futbol Taldea is a Spanish football team based in Bermeo, Biscay, in the autonomous community of Basque Country. Founded in 1950 it plays in División de Honor, holding home matches at Estadio Municipal Itxas Gane, which has a 3,000-seat capacity.

== Club background ==
- Club Bermeo - (1950–11)
- Bermeo Futbol Taldea - (2011–)

== Season to season ==
Season	Tier	Division	Place	Copa del Rey
1950–51	6	3ª Reg.	2nd	
1951–52	5	2ª Reg.	1st	
1952–53	4	1ª Reg.	4th	
1953–54	4	1ª Reg.	2nd	
1954–55	4	1ª Reg.	1st	
1955–56	3	3ª	12th	
1956–57	3	3ª	13th	
1957–58	4	1ª Reg.	9th	
1958–59	4	1ª Reg.	13th	
1959–60	5	2ª Reg.	8th	
1960–61	5	2ª Reg.	1st	
1961–62	4	1ª Reg.	8th	
1962–63	4	1ª Reg.	13th	
1963–64	4	1ª Reg.	15th	
1964–65	5	2ª Reg.	2nd	
1965–66	4	1ª Reg.	4th	
1966–67	4	1ª Reg.	3rd	
1967–68	4	1ª Reg.	3rd	
1968–69	4	Reg. Pref.	6th	
1969–70	4	Reg. Pref.	9th	

Season	Tier	Division	Place	Copa del Rey
1970–71	4	Reg. Pref.	18th	
1971–72	5	1ª Reg.	5th	
1972–73	4	Reg. Pref.	19th	
1973–74	5	1ª Reg.	15th	
1974–75	5	1ª Reg.	9th	
1975–76	5	1ª Reg.	4th	
1976–77	4	Reg. Pref.	20th	
1977–78	6	1ª Reg.	1st	
1978–79	5	Reg. Pref.	7th	
1979–80	5	Reg. Pref.	16th	
1980–81	5	Reg. Pref.	11th	
1981–82	5	Reg. Pref.	6th	
1982–83	5	Reg. Pref.	2nd	
1983–84	5	Reg. Pref.	9th	
1984–85	5	Reg. Pref.	11th	
1985–86	5	Reg. Pref.	12th	
1986–87	5	Reg. Pref.	12th	
1987–88	5	Reg. Pref.	9th	
1988–89	5	Reg. Pref.	4th	
1989–90	5	Reg. Pref.	2nd	

Season	Tier	Division	Place	Copa del Rey
1990–91	4	3ª	12th	
1991–92	4	3ª	15th	
1992–93	4	3ª	2nd	
1993–94	3	2ª B	5th	First round
1994–95	3	2ª B	14th	First round
1995–96	3	2ª B	11th	
1996–97	3	2ª B	13th	
1997–98	3	2ª B	14th	
1998–99	3	2ª B	2nd	
1999–2000	3	2ª B	17th	First round
2000–01	4	3ª	11th	
2001–02	4	3ª	13th	
2002–03	4	3ª	14th	
2003–04	4	3ª	20th	
2004–05	5	Div. Hon.	15th	
2005–06	5	Div. Hon.	2nd	
2006–07	5	Div. Hon.	6th	
2007–08	5	Div. Hon.	12th	
2008–09	5	Div. Hon.	11th	
2009–10	5	Div. Hon.	4th	

Season	Tier	Division	Place	Copa del Rey
2010–11	5	Div. Hon.	4th	
2011–12	5	Div. Hon.	2nd	
2012–13	4	3ª	7th	
2013–14	4	3ª	17th	
2014–15	4	3ª	14th	
2015–16	4	3ª	2nd	
2016–17	4	3ª	6th	
2017–18	4	3ª	17th	
2018–19	4	3ª	20th	
2019–20	5	Div. Hon.	12th	
2020–21	5	Div. Hon.	5th	
2021–22	6	Div. Hon.	5th	
2022–23	6	Div. Hon.	6th	
2023–24	6	Div. Hon.	2nd	
2024–25	6	Div. Hon.	5th	
2025–26	6	Div. Hon.		

- 7 seasons in Segunda División B
- 14 seasons in Tercera División
