= 2002–03 Segunda División B =

Segunda División B
- Season: 2002–03
- Promoted: Algeciras; Málaga B Ciudad de Murcia; Cádiz
- Relegated: Marino de Luanco; Lugo; Real Ávila; Ribadesella; Gernika; Noja; Peralta; Binéfar; Gavà; Reus; L'Hospitalet; Orihuela; Díter Zafra; Moralo; Torredonjimeno; Motril; Langreo
- Top goalscorer: Kiko Lacasa (22 goals)
- Best goalkeeper: Javier Oliva (0.43 goals)
- Biggest home win: Barakaldo 6–0 Binéfar (22 September 2002); Mataró 6–0 Mallorca B (15 December 2002)
- Biggest away win: Binéfar 0–6 Racing de Santander B (16 March 2003)
- Highest scoring: Peralta 3–7 Zaragoza B (6 April 2003)

The 2002–03 Segunda División B season of began in August 2002 and ended in May 2003.

== Summary before the 2002–03 season ==
Playoffs de Ascenso:

- Barakaldo
- Cultural Leonesa
- Compostela (P)
- Pontevedra
- Barcelona B
- Espanyol B
- L'Hospitalet
- Terrassa (P)
- Real Madrid B
- Valencia B
- Hércules
- Getafe (P)
- Motril
- Ceuta
- Almería (P)
- Mérida

Relegated from Segunda División:

- Burgos
- Gimnàstic de Tarragona
- Extremadura
- Jaén

Promoted from Tercera División:

- Langreo (from Group 2)
- Real Avilés (from Group 2)
- Ribadesella (from Group 2)
- Noja (from Group 3)
- Racing de Santander B (from Group 3)
- Palamós (from Group 5)
- Gavà (from Group 5)
- Reus (from Group 5)
- Real Ávila (from Group 8)
- Linares (from Group 9)
- Torredonjimeno (from Group 9)
- Corralejo (from Group 12)
- Orihuela (from Group 13)
- Cacereño (from Group 14)
- Moralo (from Group 14)
- Peralta (from Group 15)
- Peña Sport (from Group 15)

Relegated:

- Sporting de Gijón B
- Oviedo B
- Caudal
- Universidad de Oviedo
- Real Sociedad B
- Eibar B
- Huesca
- Alfaro
- Benidorm
- Vecindario
- Onda
- Mensajero
- Linense
- Dos Hermanas
- San Fernando
- Coria
- Beasain

Administrative relegation:

- Granada (financial trouble)

Occupied the vacant spots by administrative relegations:

- Málaga B (occupied the vacant spot of Granada)

== Group I ==
Teams from Asturias, Canary Islands, Castile and León, Community of Madrid and Galicia.

=== Teams ===
Location of teams in Segunda División B Gr. 1 2002–03
Canary Islands

| Team | Founded | Home city | Stadium |
|---|---|---|---|
| RSD Alcalá | 1929 | Alcalá, Madrid | El Val |
| Alcorcón | 1971 | Alcorcón, Madrid | Santo Domingo |
| Atlético de Madrid B | 1960 | Majadahonda, Madrid | Cerro del Espino |
| Real Ávila | 1923 | Ávila, Castile and León | Adolfo Suárez |
| Real Avilés Industrial | 1903 | Avilés, Asturias | Román Suárez Puerta |
| Celta de Vigo B | 1927 | Vigo, Galicia | Barreiro |
| Corralejo | 1975 | Corralejo, Canary Islands | Vicente Carreño Alonso |
| Cultural Leonesa | 1923 | León, Castile and León | Reino de León |
| Langreo | 1961 | Langreo, Asturias | Ganzábal |
| Lanzarote | 1970 | Arrecife, Canary Islands | Ciudad Deportiva de Lanzarote |
| Lugo | 1953 | Lugo, Galicia | Anxo Carro |
| Marino de Luanco | 1931 | Luanco, Asturias | Miramar |
| Ourense | 1952 | Ourense, Galicia | O Couto |
| Pájara Playas de Jandía | 1996 | Pájara, Canary Islands | Benito Alonso |
| Ponferradina | 1922 | Ponferrada, Castile and León | El Toralín |
| Pontevedra | 1941 | Pontevedra, Galicia | Pasarón |
| Real Madrid B | 1930 | Madrid, Madrid | Ciudad Deportiva |
| Ribadesella | 1949 | Ribadesella, Asturias | Oreyana |
| Universidad Las Palmas | 1994 | Las Palmas, Canary Islands | Alfonso Silva |
| Zamora | 1968 | Zamora, Castile and León | Ruta de la Plata |

=== League table ===
| Pos | Team | Pld | W | D | L | GF | GA | GD | Pts |
|---|---|---|---|---|---|---|---|---|---|
| 1 | Universidad Las Palmas | 38 | 21 | 9 | 8 | 65 | 39 | +26 | 72 |
| 2 | Zamora CF | 38 | 18 | 12 | 8 | 58 | 43 | +15 | 66 |
| 3 | UD Lanzarote | 38 | 17 | 13 | 8 | 64 | 44 | +20 | 64 |
| 4 | Pontevedra CF | 38 | 18 | 10 | 10 | 70 | 54 | +16 | 64 |
| 5 | CyD Leonesa | 38 | 16 | 15 | 7 | 53 | 39 | +14 | 63 |
| 6 | Real Madrid B | 38 | 15 | 14 | 9 | 57 | 39 | +18 | 59 |
| 7 | AD Alcorcón | 38 | 15 | 11 | 12 | 56 | 47 | +9 | 56 |
| 8 | UD Pájara Playas J. | 38 | 13 | 13 | 12 | 47 | 44 | +3 | 52 |
| 9 | CD Ourense | 38 | 12 | 15 | 11 | 41 | 40 | +1 | 51 |
| 10 | RSD Alcalá | 38 | 13 | 12 | 13 | 46 | 41 | +5 | 51 |
| 11 | SD Ponferradina | 38 | 13 | 10 | 15 | 48 | 51 | −3 | 49 |
| 12 | Atlético Madrid B | 38 | 11 | 15 | 12 | 38 | 37 | +1 | 48 |
| 13 | Celta de Vigo B | 38 | 11 | 15 | 12 | 45 | 42 | +3 | 48 |
| 14 | Real Avilés Industrial | 38 | 10 | 18 | 10 | 39 | 42 | −3 | 48 |
| 15 | CD Corralejo | 38 | 11 | 13 | 14 | 37 | 42 | −5 | 46 |
| 16 | UP Langreo | 38 | 11 | 12 | 15 | 33 | 39 | −6 | 45 |
| 17 | Marino de Luanco | 38 | 11 | 9 | 18 | 44 | 66 | −22 | 42 |
| 18 | CD Lugo | 38 | 11 | 9 | 18 | 38 | 51 | −13 | 42 |
| 19 | Real Ávila CF | 38 | 5 | 11 | 22 | 34 | 66 | −32 | 26 |
| 20 | Ribadesella CF | 38 | 5 | 10 | 23 | 22 | 69 | −47 | 25 |

Source: BDFutbol

=== Results ===
| Home \ Away | ALCL | ALCR | ATL | AVLA | AVLS | CEL | CLJ | CUL | LNG | LNZ | LUG | MAR | OUR | PAJ | PNF | PNT | RMA | RIB | ULP | ZAM |
|---|---|---|---|---|---|---|---|---|---|---|---|---|---|---|---|---|---|---|---|---|
| Alcalá | — | 2–2 | 1–2 | 1–0 | 2–2 | 3–2 | 1–2 | 1–1 | 0–1 | 3–0 | 2–1 | 1–1 | 0–1 | 1–1 | 1–2 | 3–1 | 1–0 | 1–0 | 0–2 | 1–0 |
| Alcorcón | 1–1 | — | 0–2 | 1–0 | 1–1 | 1–0 | 1–0 | 3–0 | 1–1 | 3–0 | 1–1 | 3–1 | 1–2 | 2–2 | 1–1 | 3–4 | 1–0 | 2–0 | 1–0 | 1–0 |
| Atlético Madrid B | 1–0 | 2–1 | — | 0–2 | 2–1 | 0–0 | 1–2 | 3–1 | 1–3 | 1–2 | 1–1 | 2–3 | 0–2 | 1–2 | 1–0 | 4–1 | 1–1 | 0–0 | 0–0 | 0–0 |
| Real Ávila | 1–4 | 1–1 | 0–3 | — | 1–1 | 0–0 | 0–1 | 1–0 | 0–1 | 0–1 | 0–2 | 3–1 | 1–2 | 0–1 | 2–3 | 2–2 | 0–0 | 1–1 | 3–2 | 1–1 |
| Real Avilés Ind. | 0–0 | 2–1 | 1–1 | 1–0 | — | 0–0 | 2–2 | 2–0 | 0–0 | 0–0 | 1–0 | 1–1 | 0–0 | 3–0 | 0–2 | 1–1 | 0–3 | 1–0 | 3–1 | 1–2 |
| Celta B | 3–2 | 2–2 | 0–1 | 5–2 | 0–0 | — | 1–2 | 0–1 | 0–0 | 0–0 | 1–1 | 5–0 | 0–0 | 1–1 | 3–1 | 2–2 | 0–2 | 3–0 | 2–1 | 1–1 |
| Corralejo | 1–1 | 4–2 | 0–1 | 0–0 | 2–0 | 2–1 | — | 0–0 | 2–1 | 0–0 | 2–0 | 0–3 | 1–2 | 2–2 | 1–3 | 1–2 | 1–0 | 2–1 | 0–1 | 2–3 |
| Cultural Leonesa | 2–1 | 1–0 | 1–0 | 0–0 | 0–0 | 0–0 | 0–0 | — | 2–2 | 1–1 | 4–0 | 4–2 | 4–0 | 0–2 | 0–2 | 0–0 | 2–1 | 3–0 | 3–1 | 2–2 |
| Langreo | 0–0 | 3–1 | 1–1 | 1–1 | 0–1 | 0–1 | 1–0 | 2–4 | — | 1–1 | 0–1 | 1–2 | 1–0 | 1–0 | 0–0 | 0–3 | 0–0 | 3–0 | 1–2 | 2–1 |
| Lanzarote | 2–0 | 2–1 | 3–2 | 4–1 | 2–2 | 3–0 | 1–1 | 2–2 | 2–0 | — | 3–2 | 5–1 | 1–1 | 0–0 | 2–1 | 2–1 | 1–2 | 5–1 | 0–0 | 4–1 |
| Lugo | 1–0 | 1–2 | 0–0 | 2–4 | 3–0 | 0–1 | 0–0 | 3–0 | 0–1 | 1–3 | — | 0–3 | 2–1 | 2–2 | 1–0 | 1–2 | 1–3 | 2–1 | 1–0 | 0–2 |
| Marino | 1–2 | 3–3 | 1–1 | 2–0 | 2–1 | 0–0 | 1–0 | 2–2 | 1–1 | 1–3 | 1–3 | — | 2–0 | 1–0 | 1–1 | 1–0 | 1–0 | 1–1 | 1–2 | 1–3 |
| Ourense | 2–0 | 0–0 | 0–0 | 4–1 | 0–2 | 1–3 | 1–1 | 0–0 | 1–0 | 4–2 | 0–0 | 5–0 | — | 0–0 | 1–1 | 1–3 | 1–1 | 1–1 | 0–1 | 1–2 |
| Pájara Playas | 2–1 | 1–2 | 2–0 | 3–0 | 3–3 | 0–2 | 0–0 | 1–1 | 1–0 | 2–1 | 3–1 | 1–0 | 1–0 | — | 3–1 | 1–1 | 2–2 | 4–1 | 1–2 | 1–2 |
| Ponferradina | 0–2 | 0–2 | 1–1 | 2–1 | 2–1 | 1–3 | 2–1 | 1–3 | 2–1 | 0–1 | 1–3 | 1–0 | 1–1 | 1–0 | — | 5–0 | 0–3 | 4–0 | 1–1 | 2–2 |
| Pontevedra | 0–0 | 1–3 | 0–0 | 4–1 | 1–2 | 3–1 | 1–0 | 3–4 | 2–0 | 0–0 | 1–0 | 4–1 | 2–2 | 2–0 | 2–0 | — | 4–3 | 5–1 | 1–3 | 3–4 |
| Real Madrid B | 0–1 | 2–1 | 1–1 | 3–1 | 4–2 | 3–0 | 0–0 | 1–1 | 1–1 | 1–0 | 3–0 | 2–1 | 1–2 | 3–1 | 2–2 | 2–2 | — | 1–0 | 1–1 | 1–1 |
| Ribadesella | 0–3 | 1–4 | 1–0 | 2–2 | 0–0 | 2–1 | 1–1 | 0–1 | 0–1 | 1–0 | 0–0 | 1–0 | 0–1 | 0–0 | 1–0 | 0–2 | 1–1 | — | 2–3 | 0–1 |
| Universidad LPGC | 2–2 | 1–0 | 1–0 | 3–1 | 1–1 | 3–0 | 2–0 | 0–2 | 2–0 | 4–4 | 1–1 | 3–0 | 3–0 | 2–1 | 2–0 | 0–2 | 3–1 | 4–0 | — | 4–2 |
| Zamora | 1–1 | 2–0 | 1–1 | 1–0 | 2–0 | 1–1 | 3–1 | 0–1 | 2–1 | 2–1 | 1–0 | 1–0 | 1–1 | 2–0 | 1–1 | 0–2 | 1–2 | 5–1 | 1–1 | — |

Source: BDFutbol
Legend: Blue = home team win; Yellow = draw; Red = away team win.

=== Top goalscorers ===
| Goalscorers | Goals | Team |
|---|---|---|
| (Spain) Jonathan Sesma | 20 | Universidad Las Palmas |
| (Spain) Javi Rodríguez | 20 | Pontevedra |
| (Spain) Nacho Franco | 18 | Lanzarote |
| (Spain) Luis García | 17 | Real Madrid B |
| (Spain) José María Simón | 16 | Corralejo |

== Group II ==
Teams from Aragon, Basque Country, Cantabria, Castilla–La Mancha, La Rioja and Navarre

=== Teams ===
Location of teams in Segunda División B Gr. 2 2002–03

| Team | Founded | Home city | Stadium |
|---|---|---|---|
| Alavés B | 1960 | Vitoria, Basque Country | José Luis Compañón |
| Amurrio | 1949 | Amurrio, Basque Country | Basarte |
| Athletic Bilbao B | 1964 | Bilbao, Basque Country | Lezama |
| Aurrerá Vitoria | 1935 | Vitoria, Basque Country | Olanrabe |
| Barakaldo | 1917 | Barakaldo, Basque Country | Ciudad Deportiva de San Vicente |
| Binéfar | 1922 | Binéfar, Aragon | Los Olmos |
| Calahorra | 1946 | Calahorra, La Rioja | La Planilla |
| Conquense | 1946 | Cuenca, Castilla–La Mancha | La Fuensanta |
| Gernika | 1922 | Gernika, Basque Country | Urbieta |
| Gimnástica Torrelavega | 1907 | Torrelavega, Cantabria | El Malecón |
| Logroñés | 1940 | Logroño, La Rioja | Las Gaunas |
| Noja | 1963 | Noja, Cantabria | La Caseta |
| Osasuna B | 1962 | Aranguren, Navarre | Tajonar |
| Peña Sport | 1925 | Tafalla, Navarre | San Francisco |
| Peralta | 1927 | Peralta, Navarre | Las Luchas |
| Racing Santander B | 1926 | Santander, Cantabria | La Albericia |
| Real Unión | 1915 | Irún, Basque Country | Stadium Gal |
| Talavera | 1948 | Talavera de la Reina, Castilla–La Mancha | El Prado |
| Toledo | 1928 | Toledo, Castilla–La Mancha | Salto del Caballo |
| Zaragoza B | 1958 | Zaragoza, Aragon | Ciudad Deportiva del Real Zaragoza |

=== League Table ===
| Pos | Team | Pld | W | D | L | GF | GA | GD | Pts |
|---|---|---|---|---|---|---|---|---|---|
| 1 | Real Unión | 38 | 21 | 7 | 10 | 54 | 32 | +22 | 70 |
| 2 | Barakaldo CF | 38 | 19 | 11 | 8 | 55 | 36 | +19 | 68 |
| 3 | CD Logroñés | 38 | 20 | 11 | 7 | 58 | 33 | +25 | 68 (Note: 3 points deducted?) |
| 4 | Athletic Bilbao B | 38 | 19 | 9 | 10 | 55 | 43 | +12 | 66 |
| 5 | Deportivo Alavés B | 38 | 17 | 13 | 8 | 45 | 33 | +12 | 64 |
| 6 | Gim. Torrelavega | 38 | 16 | 10 | 12 | 39 | 32 | +7 | 58 |
| 7 | UB Conquense | 38 | 14 | 15 | 9 | 36 | 29 | +7 | 57 |
| 8 | Amurrio Club | 38 | 17 | 5 | 16 | 51 | 46 | +5 | 56 |
| 9 | CA Osasuna B | 38 | 13 | 13 | 12 | 41 | 32 | +9 | 52 |
| 10 | Talavera CF | 38 | 12 | 13 | 13 | 45 | 48 | −3 | 49 |
| 11 | Racing de Santander B | 38 | 13 | 10 | 15 | 48 | 45 | +3 | 49 |
| 12 | CD Toledo | 38 | 12 | 12 | 14 | 38 | 41 | −3 | 48 |
| 13 | Real Zaragoza B | 38 | 12 | 12 | 14 | 42 | 41 | +1 | 48 |
| 14 | CD Peña Sport | 38 | 11 | 13 | 14 | 45 | 48 | −3 | 46 |
| 15 | CD Aurrerá de Vitoria | 38 | 11 | 12 | 15 | 31 | 41 | −10 | 45 |
| 16 | CD Calahorra | 38 | 10 | 14 | 14 | 37 | 50 | −13 | 44 |
| 17 | SD Gernika Club | 38 | 10 | 12 | 16 | 30 | 41 | −11 | 42 |
| 18 | SD Noja | 38 | 9 | 10 | 19 | 40 | 51 | −11 | 37 |
| 19 | CM Peralta | 38 | 8 | 11 | 19 | 31 | 51 | −20 | 35 |
| 20 | CD Binéfar | 38 | 5 | 9 | 24 | 42 | 90 | −48 | 24 |

Source: BDFutbol

=== Results ===
| Home \ Away | ALV | AMU | ATH | AUR | BAR | BIN | CAL | CON | GER | GIM | LOG | NOJ | OSA | PEÑ | PER | RAC | RUN | TAL | TOL | ZAR |
|---|---|---|---|---|---|---|---|---|---|---|---|---|---|---|---|---|---|---|---|---|
| Alavés B | — | 4–3 | 1–0 | 2–1 | 1–0 | 1–1 | 1–0 | 0–1 | 1–0 | 1–1 | 1–0 | 2–1 | 1–0 | 1–1 | 1–0 | 0–0 | 1–3 | 2–1 | 0–0 | 1–2 |
| Amurrio | 2–1 | — | 1–1 | 0–1 | 0–1 | 4–0 | 3–2 | 2–1 | 2–0 | 3–1 | 5–2 | 0–1 | 1–2 | 1–3 | 0–0 | 1–1 | 3–1 | 2–1 | 0–2 | 1–0 |
| Athletic Bilbao B | 1–1 | 1–1 | — | 1–0 | 2–3 | 4–0 | 0–0 | 1–0 | 1–0 | 1–2 | 0–1 | 2–1 | 3–2 | 2–0 | 2–0 | 1–0 | 2–1 | 4–0 | 5–3 | 2–3 |
| Aurrerá Vitoria | 0–2 | 0–1 | 0–2 | — | 1–1 | 2–1 | 1–1 | 0–0 | 0–0 | 0–0 | 1–1 | 2–2 | 0–1 | 0–1 | 3–1 | 2–2 | 1–3 | 3–1 | 0–1 | 1–0 |
| Barakaldo | 2–1 | 0–2 | 1–1 | 2–0 | — | 6–0 | 1–0 | 3–0 | 1–0 | 2–1 | 1–1 | 2–0 | 1–2 | 1–3 | 3–2 | 3–1 | 1–0 | 3–2 | 2–0 | 0–2 |
| Binéfar | 2–2 | 3–5 | 1–2 | 1–2 | 3–4 | — | 3–0 | 1–3 | 0–2 | 1–0 | 3–0 | 3–1 | 1–1 | 2–2 | 1–3 | 0–6 | 0–2 | 0–0 | 5–1 | 1–1 |
| Calahorra | 0–2 | 1–0 | 2–2 | 1–2 | 1–1 | 1–1 | — | 1–1 | 3–1 | 0–1 | 2–1 | 2–1 | 2–1 | 1–0 | 2–2 | 0–0 | 0–2 | 1–1 | 2–0 | 1–1 |
| Conquense | 1–1 | 0–1 | 2–0 | 0–0 | 0–0 | 1–0 | 4–0 | — | 1–0 | 1–0 | 0–1 | 3–1 | 0–4 | 1–1 | 1–0 | 2–2 | 3–2 | 0–0 | 0–0 | 1–1 |
| Gernika | 0–0 | 1–1 | 1–1 | 1–0 | 0–0 | 1–1 | 2–1 | 1–1 | — | 0–0 | 0–0 | 2–1 | 0–4 | 3–2 | 2–0 | 2–0 | 1–2 | 0–3 | 1–1 | 1–1 |
| Gim. Torrelavega | 0–0 | 0–1 | 1–0 | 0–2 | 1–0 | 3–0 | 1–0 | 1–1 | 0–1 | — | 0–1 | 3–2 | 1–0 | 2–2 | 0–0 | 3–0 | 0–1 | 2–1 | 1–0 | 1–2 |
| Logroñés | 1–0 | 1–2 | 1–1 | 2–0 | 1–2 | 2–2 | 0–0 | 2–0 | 3–0 | 2–1 | — | 3–0 | 3–1 | 4–2 | 2–0 | 1–1 | 1–1 | 5–0 | 1–1 | 0–2 |
| Noja | 3–2 | 0–1 | 5–0 | 3–0 | 1–1 | 2–0 | 1–2 | 0–1 | 1–0 | 1–1 | 0–1 | — | 0–0 | 1–1 | 1–0 | 0–1 | 0–3 | 1–1 | 2–2 | 0–0 |
| Osasuna B | 0–0 | 2–0 | 0–0 | 3–0 | 2–2 | 5–1 | 0–0 | 0–0 | 1–0 | 1–2 | 1–2 | 0–1 | — | 0–0 | 1–1 | 3–1 | 0–2 | 1–0 | 0–0 | 0–0 |
| Peña Sport | 2–3 | 1–0 | 2–4 | 1–1 | 1–0 | 6–1 | 1–1 | 0–2 | 0–1 | 0–1 | 2–2 | 1–0 | 3–0 | — | 0–2 | 1–1 | 0–0 | 1–1 | 1–0 | 0–0 |
| Peralta | 1–4 | 1–0 | 1–2 | 0–1 | 1–0 | 2–0 | 0–2 | 0–2 | 1–0 | 0–2 | 0–2 | 0–0 | 0–0 | 0–1 | — | 1–0 | 2–2 | 1–1 | 1–1 | 3–7 |
| Racing Santander B | 1–2 | 2–1 | 3–0 | 0–1 | 2–3 | 3–0 | 1–1 | 2–0 | 2–1 | 0–2 | 0–3 | 2–1 | 2–1 | 1–0 | 1–0 | — | 0–1 | 0–1 | 1–0 | 0–0 |
| Real Unión | 0–0 | 1–0 | 2–0 | 1–1 | 0–1 | 2–1 | 5–1 | 0–0 | 0–2 | 1–1 | 0–1 | 2–1 | 2–0 | 2–0 | 2–1 | 3–2 | — | 0–1 | 1–0 | 1–0 |
| Talavera | 1–2 | 2–0 | 0–1 | 1–2 | 0–0 | 3–2 | 2–0 | 0–0 | 2–1 | 1–1 | 0–0 | 1–1 | 0–1 | 4–1 | 1–1 | 3–2 | 2–1 | — | 1–0 | 3–1 |
| Toledo | 0–0 | 3–0 | 0–1 | 1–0 | 0–0 | 3–0 | 4–2 | 0–2 | 1–1 | 3–0 | 0–2 | 3–1 | 0–1 | 2–0 | 0–0 | 1–5 | 1–0 | 1–1 | — | 2–1 |
| Zaragoza B | 1–0 | 2–1 | 1–2 | 0–0 | 1–1 | 2–0 | 0–1 | 1–0 | 2–1 | 0–2 | 1–2 | 1–2 | 0–0 | 0–2 | 1–3 | 0–0 | 1–2 | 4–2 | 0–1 | — |

Source: BDFutbol
Legend: Blue = home team win; Yellow = draw; Red = away team win.

=== Top goalscorers ===
| Goalscorers | Goals | Team |
|---|---|---|
| (Spain) Kiko Lacasa | 22 | Alavés B |
| (Spain) Paulino Martínez | 18 | Logroñés |
| (Spain) Iván Estecha | 17 | Talavera |
| (Spain) Nacho Rodríguez | 15 | Racing B |
| (Spain) Alberto Alejandro | 14 | Barakaldo |

== Group III ==
Teams from Balearic Islands, Castile and León, Catalonia and Valencian Community

=== Teams ===
Location of teams in Segunda División B Gr. 3 2002–03

| Team | Founded | Home city | Stadium |
|---|---|---|---|
| Alicante | 1918 | Alicante, Valencian Community | José Rico Pérez |
| Barcelona B | 1970 | Barcelona, Catalonia | Mini Estadi |
| Burgos | 1994 | Burgos, Castile and León | El Plantío |
| Castellón | 1922 | Castellón de la Plana, Valencian Community | Nou Castàlia |
| Espanyol B | 1981 | Sant Adrià de Besòs, Catalonia | Ciutat Esportiva RCD Espanyol |
| Figueres | 1919 | Figueres, Catalonia | Vilatenim |
| Gavà | 1922 | Gavà, Catalonia | La Bòbila |
| Gimnàstic de Tarragona | 1886 | Tarragona, Catalonia | Nou Estadi |
| Gramenet | 1994 | Santa Coloma de Gramenet, Catalonia | Nou Camp Municipal |
| Hércules Alicante | 1922 | Alicante, Valencian Community | José Rico Pérez |
| L'Hospitalet | 1957 | L'Hospitalet de Llobregat, Catalonia | La Feixa Llarga |
| Lleida | 1947 | Lleida, Catalonia | Camp d'Esports |
| Mallorca B | 1967 | Palma, Balearic Islands | Lluís Sitjar |
| Mataró | 1939 | Mataró, Catalonia | Camp del Centenari |
| Novelda | 1925 | Novelda, Valencian Community | La Magdalena |
| Orihuela | 1993 | Orihuela, Valencian Community | Los Arcos |
| Palamós | 1898 | Palamós, Catalonia | Nou Municipal |
| Reus | 1909 | Reus, Catalonia | Camp Nou Municipal |
| Sabadell | 1903 | Sabadell, Catalonia | Nova Creu Alta |
| Valencia B | 1944 | Valencia, Valencian Community | Ciudad Deportiva de Paterna |

=== League Table ===
| Pos | Team | Pld | W | D | L | GF | GA | GD | Pts |
|---|---|---|---|---|---|---|---|---|---|
| 1 | CD Castellón | 38 | 20 | 14 | 4 | 48 | 17 | +31 | 74 |
| 2 | FC Barcelona B | 38 | 18 | 10 | 10 | 64 | 44 | +20 | 64 |
| 3 | Burgos CF | 38 | 15 | 14 | 9 | 38 | 28 | +10 | 59 |
| 4 | UDA Gramenet | 38 | 15 | 12 | 11 | 38 | 33 | +5 | 57 |
| 5 | Alicante CF | 38 | 15 | 12 | 11 | 56 | 43 | +13 | 57 |
| 6 | Valencia CF B | 38 | 16 | 9 | 13 | 56 | 53 | +3 | 57 |
| 7 | CE Sabadell FC | 38 | 16 | 6 | 16 | 47 | 54 | −7 | 54 |
| 8 | UE Lleida | 38 | 14 | 12 | 12 | 45 | 44 | +1 | 54 |
| 9 | Gimnàstic | 38 | 13 | 14 | 11 | 46 | 42 | +4 | 53 |
| 10 | RCD Espanyol B | 38 | 15 | 8 | 15 | 52 | 48 | +4 | 53 |
| 11 | Hércules CF | 38 | 12 | 16 | 10 | 45 | 35 | +10 | 52 |
| 12 | Palamós CF | 38 | 13 | 13 | 12 | 45 | 47 | −2 | 52 |
| 13 | CE Mataró | 38 | 13 | 8 | 17 | 51 | 54 | −3 | 47 |
| 14 | RCD Mallorca B | 38 | 11 | 14 | 13 | 44 | 50 | −6 | 47 |
| 15 | Novelda CF | 38 | 10 | 14 | 14 | 37 | 50 | −13 | 44 |
| 16 | UE Figueres | 38 | 10 | 14 | 14 | 43 | 47 | −4 | 44 |
| 17 | CF Gavà | 38 | 11 | 11 | 16 | 40 | 57 | −17 | 44 |
| 18 | CF Reus Deportiu | 38 | 11 | 8 | 19 | 44 | 59 | −15 | 41 |
| 19 | CE L'Hospitalet | 38 | 9 | 11 | 18 | 34 | 50 | −16 | 38 |
| 20 | Orihuela CF | 38 | 6 | 14 | 18 | 34 | 52 | −18 | 32 |

Source: BDFutbol

=== Results ===
| Home \ Away | ALI | BAR | BUR | CAS | ESP | FIG | GAV | GIM | GRA | HER | HOS | LLE | MAL | MAT | NOV | ORI | PAL | REU | SAB | VAL |
|---|---|---|---|---|---|---|---|---|---|---|---|---|---|---|---|---|---|---|---|---|
| Alicante | — | 0–1 | 1–0 | 0–1 | 2–2 | 2–2 | 0–0 | 0–1 | 1–1 | 1–3 | 1–0 | 1–2 | 1–2 | 3–2 | 3–0 | 0–0 | 5–0 | 1–2 | 4–2 | 0–0 |
| Barcelona B | 1–2 | — | 2–0 | 1–1 | 2–2 | 3–1 | 2–1 | 1–2 | 1–1 | 0–5 | 1–2 | 5–1 | 3–1 | 1–0 | 4–1 | 1–1 | 1–2 | 3–0 | 6–2 | 4–0 |
| Burgos | 1–2 | 0–0 | — | 0–0 | 1–1 | 2–1 | 0–1 | 0–0 | 1–1 | 2–0 | 1–0 | 0–0 | 0–1 | 0–0 | 2–0 | 1–0 | 1–0 | 2–0 | 1–0 | 2–0 |
| Castellón | 0–0 | 2–1 | 1–1 | — | 1–0 | 1–1 | 0–0 | 3–1 | 3–1 | 1–2 | 1–0 | 3–0 | 3–0 | 1–0 | 3–1 | 2–0 | 2–2 | 2–1 | 2–1 | 2–0 |
| Espanyol B | 2–1 | 0–2 | 1–1 | 1–0 | — | 2–0 | 1–2 | 0–1 | 1–0 | 2–1 | 2–1 | 2–0 | 3–1 | 2–1 | 2–1 | 3–1 | 0–2 | 1–2 | 1–2 | 0–0 |
| Figueres | 3–2 | 1–2 | 1–1 | 0–1 | 2–1 | — | 2–2 | 1–1 | 0–1 | 1–1 | 0–0 | 0–1 | 2–1 | 2–1 | 0–1 | 3–1 | 1–1 | 1–1 | 0–0 | 1–2 |
| Gavà | 0–1 | 1–2 | 1–3 | 0–3 | 0–4 | 0–3 | — | 1–0 | 2–0 | 0–0 | 1–1 | 2–1 | 3–2 | 4–3 | 0–0 | 3–1 | 0–3 | 1–1 | 3–0 | 0–2 |
| Gim. Tarragona | 4–4 | 1–2 | 0–1 | 0–0 | 1–0 | 1–4 | 2–1 | — | 3–2 | 0–0 | 1–1 | 1–2 | 2–2 | 3–0 | 1–0 | 3–3 | 1–1 | 1–1 | 1–0 | 2–0 |
| Gramenet | 2–1 | 0–2 | 0–0 | 0–1 | 2–1 | 1–0 | 2–0 | 0–2 | — | 2–0 | 1–0 | 0–0 | 1–1 | 1–0 | 1–1 | 0–0 | 1–0 | 2–2 | 2–1 | 3–1 |
| Hércules | 1–1 | 3–0 | 1–0 | 0–0 | 0–2 | 2–2 | 1–3 | 2–1 | 0–0 | — | 2–2 | 0–0 | 0–1 | 3–0 | 3–1 | 0–0 | 3–1 | 1–1 | 1–0 | 0–0 |
| L'Hospitalet | 0–4 | 0–1 | 1–1 | 0–0 | 0–0 | 2–0 | 2–2 | 2–1 | 0–1 | 0–1 | — | 0–3 | 1–0 | 0–2 | 1–2 | 1–0 | 4–1 | 1–0 | 1–2 | 1–3 |
| Lleida | 1–2 | 1–1 | 0–1 | 1–1 | 1–1 | 3–1 | 0–2 | 0–0 | 1–0 | 2–2 | 4–0 | — | 0–0 | 3–1 | 2–2 | 3–0 | 3–0 | 1–0 | 1–2 | 2–1 |
| Mallorca B | 2–2 | 0–0 | 4–2 | 0–2 | 1–1 | 1–0 | 3–1 | 0–0 | 1–0 | 3–1 | 0–0 | 0–0 | — | 2–2 | 0–0 | 2–0 | 2–0 | 1–2 | 4–0 | 3–3 |
| Mataró | 1–1 | 0–0 | 2–1 | 1–0 | 3–2 | 0–1 | 2–0 | 2–2 | 2–2 | 1–0 | 2–1 | 5–0 | 6–0 | — | 1–1 | 2–1 | 1–3 | 3–1 | 3–2 | 0–4 |
| Novelda | 1–1 | 2–1 | 0–3 | 0–0 | 3–0 | 4–2 | 2–0 | 0–2 | 0–0 | 0–0 | 1–3 | 0–0 | 2–0 | 1–0 | — | 1–1 | 2–1 | 1–1 | 0–1 | 0–1 |
| Orihuela | 0–1 | 0–0 | 1–1 | 0–0 | 1–2 | 1–1 | 1–1 | 3–0 | 0–2 | 0–0 | 3–1 | 1–2 | 3–1 | 2–0 | 1–1 | — | 0–2 | 2–0 | 1–1 | 1–2 |
| Palamós | 0–1 | 0–0 | 0–0 | 0–0 | 2–5 | 0–0 | 5–1 | 0–3 | 2–0 | 1–1 | 1–1 | 2–0 | 1–0 | 0–0 | 2–2 | 1–0 | — | 2–1 | 0–2 | 1–0 |
| Reus | 1–2 | 4–3 | 1–3 | 0–1 | 2–0 | 0–1 | 0–0 | 1–0 | 0–3 | 1–0 | 1–1 | 3–2 | 2–1 | 1–2 | 1–2 | 1–2 | 0–3 | — | 3–1 | 4–2 |
| Sabadell | 1–0 | 2–1 | 0–1 | 0–4 | 3–2 | 1–2 | 1–0 | 0–0 | 2–0 | 3–1 | 1–2 | 1–0 | 0–0 | 2–0 | 2–0 | 3–0 | 1–1 | 2–1 | — | 0–2 |
| Valencia B | 1–2 | 2–3 | 4–1 | 1–0 | 2–0 | 0–0 | 1–1 | 2–1 | 0–2 | 0–4 | 2–1 | 1–2 | 1–1 | 1–0 | 4–1 | 4–2 | 2–2 | 2–1 | 3–3 | — |

Source: BDFutbol
Legend: Blue = home team win; Yellow = draw; Red = away team win.

=== Top goalscorers ===
| Goalscorers | Goals | Team |
|---|---|---|
| (Spain) Sergio García | 19 | Barcelona B |
| (Spain) Jorge Barbarín | 16 | Burgos |
| (Spain) Javier Morante | 16 | Alicante |
| (Spain) Raúl Caballero | 15 | Gramenet |
| (Spain) Nano García del Pozo | 15 | Lleida |

== Group IV ==
Teams from Andalusia, Ceuta, Extremadura, Melilla and Region of Murcia

=== Teams ===
Location of teams in Segunda División B Gr. 4 2002–03

| Team | Founded | Home city | Stadium |
|---|---|---|---|
| Algeciras | 1909 | Algeciras, Andalusia | Nuevo Mirador |
| Real Betis B | 1962 | Seville, Andalusia | Ciudad Deportiva Ruíz de Lopera |
| Cacereño | 1919 | Cáceres, Extremadura | Príncipe Felipe |
| Cádiz | 1910 | Cádiz, Andalusia | Ramón de Carranza |
| Cartagonova | 1995 | Cartagena, Region of Murcia | Cartagonova |
| Ceuta | 1996 | Ceuta | Alfonso Murube |
| Ciudad de Murcia | 1999 | Murcia, Region of Murcia | La Condomina |
| Díter Zafra | 1930 | Zafra, Extremadura | Nuevo Estadio |
| Écija | 1939 | Écija, Andalusia | San Pablo |
| Extremadura | 1924 | Almendralejo, Extremadura | Francisco de la Hera |
| Real Jaén | 1922 | Jaén, Andalusia | Nuevo La Victoria |
| Jerez | 1969 | Jerez de los Caballeros, Extremadura | Manuel Calzado Galván |
| Linares | 1990 | Linares, Andalusia | Linarejos |
| Málaga B | 1990 | Málaga, Andalusia | Ciudad Deportiva de El Viso |
| Melilla | 1976 | Melilla | Álvarez Claro |
| Mérida | 1990 | Mérida, Extremadura | Romano |
| Moralo | 1965 | Navalmoral de la Mata, Extremadura | Municipal de Navalmoral |
| Motril | 1984 | Motril, Andalusia | Escribano Castilla |
| Sevilla B | 1958 | Seville, Andalusia | José Ramón Cisneros Palacios |
| Torredonjimeno | 1940 | Torredonjimeno, Andalusia | Matías Prats |

=== League Table ===
| Pos | Team | Pld | W | D | L | GF | GA | GD | Pts |
|---|---|---|---|---|---|---|---|---|---|
| 1 | Algeciras CF | 38 | 19 | 15 | 4 | 46 | 22 | +24 | 72 |
| 2 | Málaga CF B | 38 | 20 | 10 | 8 | 50 | 28 | +22 | 70 |
| 3 | Ciudad de Murcia | 38 | 19 | 11 | 8 | 52 | 25 | +27 | 68 |
| 4 | Cádiz CF | 38 | 19 | 11 | 8 | 57 | 32 | +25 | 68 |
| 5 | CF Extremadura | 38 | 18 | 11 | 9 | 52 | 36 | +16 | 65 |
| 6 | CP Cacereño | 38 | 17 | 11 | 10 | 58 | 42 | +16 | 62 |
| 7 | AD Ceuta | 38 | 16 | 12 | 10 | 43 | 38 | +5 | 60 |
| 8 | Écija Balompié | 38 | 14 | 11 | 13 | 44 | 45 | −1 | 53 |
| 9 | Jerez CF | 38 | 11 | 15 | 12 | 30 | 26 | +4 | 48 |
| 10 | Sevilla FC B | 38 | 11 | 15 | 12 | 34 | 39 | −5 | 48 |
| 11 | Cartagonova FC | 38 | 11 | 14 | 13 | 30 | 31 | −1 | 47 |
| 12 | Real Jaén | 38 | 11 | 13 | 14 | 43 | 45 | −2 | 46 |
| 13 | Mérida UD | 38 | 12 | 10 | 16 | 32 | 39 | −7 | 46 |
| 14 | UD Melilla | 38 | 11 | 13 | 14 | 31 | 42 | −11 | 46 |
| 15 | Real Betis B | 38 | 11 | 12 | 15 | 44 | 45 | −1 | 45 |
| 16 | CD Linares | 38 | 10 | 14 | 14 | 31 | 39 | −8 | 44 |
| 17 | CD Díter Zafra | 38 | 9 | 16 | 13 | 32 | 39 | −7 | 43 |
| 18 | Moralo CP | 38 | 9 | 10 | 19 | 30 | 56 | −26 | 37 |
| 19 | Torredonjimeno CF | 38 | 6 | 10 | 22 | 33 | 62 | −29 | 28 |
| 20 | Motril CF | 38 | 4 | 10 | 24 | 32 | 73 | −41 | 22 |

Source: BDFutbol

=== Results ===
| Home \ Away | ALG | BET | CAC | CAD | CAR | CEU | CIU | DIT | ECI | EXT | JAE | JER | LIN | MAL | MEL | MER | MOR | MOT | SEV | TOR |
|---|---|---|---|---|---|---|---|---|---|---|---|---|---|---|---|---|---|---|---|---|
| Algeciras | — | 1–0 | 0–1 | 1–1 | 2–1 | 3–0 | 1–0 | 1–1 | 1–0 | 1–0 | 1–1 | 0–0 | 3–1 | 2–0 | 2–1 | 1–1 | 1–0 | 1–0 | 1–0 | 2–0 |
| Betis B | 0–0 | — | 1–1 | 2–1 | 1–3 | 1–1 | 1–4 | 2–2 | 1–1 | 1–1 | 2–2 | 1–0 | 2–0 | 2–1 | 2–2 | 4–0 | 3–1 | 3–0 | 2–0 | 4–1 |
| Cacereño | 2–2 | 1–0 | — | 3–2 | 1–0 | 3–1 | 1–1 | 1–1 | 1–2 | 1–2 | 4–2 | 0–0 | 2–0 | 2–0 | 0–1 | 1–0 | 4–0 | 2–2 | 0–0 | 2–2 |
| Cádiz | 1–1 | 2–1 | 5–1 | — | 1–0 | 3–0 | 1–0 | 1–1 | 3–0 | 1–1 | 2–0 | 0–3 | 3–0 | 2–1 | 2–0 | 1–0 | 5–1 | 2–1 | 3–0 | 2–0 |
| Cartagonova | 0–2 | 2–1 | 1–0 | 0–0 | — | 2–0 | 1–0 | 0–1 | 1–1 | 1–1 | 0–0 | 2–1 | 1–1 | 0–3 | 2–0 | 3–1 | 0–1 | 0–0 | 2–0 | 2–0 |
| Ceuta | 2–1 | 1–1 | 3–2 | 0–1 | 1–0 | — | 0–0 | 2–1 | 1–1 | 1–1 | 1–0 | 1–0 | 2–1 | 0–2 | 2–1 | 1–0 | 0–1 | 1–1 | 2–0 | 5–1 |
| Ciudad de Murcia | 2–0 | 3–0 | 1–2 | 3–1 | 2–0 | 0–2 | — | 1–0 | 3–1 | 2–1 | 2–1 | 2–0 | 2–2 | 4–1 | 1–1 | 0–1 | 1–0 | 2–0 | 3–1 | 1–0 |
| Díter Zafra | 1–1 | 1–0 | 0–0 | 0–1 | 0–0 | 0–0 | 0–1 | — | 0–2 | 0–2 | 1–1 | 1–0 | 1–1 | 0–1 | 4–2 | 2–0 | 1–4 | 0–0 | 0–0 | 2–0 |
| Écija | 0–1 | 2–0 | 3–2 | 0–0 | 3–1 | 0–0 | 0–0 | 2–0 | — | 0–0 | 1–1 | 2–2 | 4–2 | 0–0 | 1–2 | 2–1 | 1–0 | 3–2 | 0–2 | 1–0 |
| Extremadura | 0–2 | 1–0 | 2–0 | 1–1 | 3–2 | 1–2 | 1–0 | 3–1 | 3–0 | — | 1–1 | 0–1 | 3–2 | 1–1 | 1–0 | 1–1 | 3–0 | 2–1 | 3–1 | 1–1 |
| Real Jaén | 1–1 | 1–0 | 1–2 | 1–2 | 0–0 | 0–3 | 0–0 | 2–2 | 2–1 | 2–3 | — | 1–0 | 1–2 | 0–1 | 2–0 | 1–0 | 0–0 | 3–1 | 2–2 | 3–1 |
| Jerez | 0–0 | 1–2 | 0–2 | 2–0 | 1–1 | 1–0 | 0–0 | 0–0 | 2–1 | 2–1 | 1–0 | — | 0–0 | 0–1 | 0–0 | 1–1 | 0–1 | 3–0 | 0–0 | 1–0 |
| Linares | 0–0 | 1–0 | 1–0 | 0–0 | 0–0 | 0–0 | 0–0 | 0–2 | 1–0 | 1–2 | 2–1 | 0–0 | — | 0–1 | 2–1 | 0–1 | 2–0 | 3–1 | 1–2 | 2–0 |
| Málaga B | 0–5 | 2–0 | 1–0 | 2–1 | 1–0 | 1–1 | 1–1 | 0–0 | 4–1 | 1–0 | 0–0 | 2–1 | 1–1 | — | 3–1 | 0–1 | 5–0 | 3–0 | 1–2 | 4–0 |
| Melilla | 0–0 | 2–0 | 0–4 | 1–1 | 1–0 | 0–2 | 0–3 | 2–1 | 1–0 | 0–0 | 1–2 | 0–0 | 1–0 | 0–0 | — | 0–0 | 1–1 | 4–0 | 0–2 | 1–1 |
| Mérida | 0–1 | 0–0 | 2–4 | 1–0 | 0–0 | 0–1 | 2–0 | 2–1 | 1–1 | 1–0 | 1–0 | 1–0 | 0–1 | 0–0 | 0–0 | — | 3–1 | 4–1 | 1–0 | 1–2 |
| Moralo | 0–1 | 0–2 | 1–1 | 0–0 | 1–1 | 3–0 | 1–1 | 1–1 | 1–0 | 0–1 | 0–1 | 0–3 | 1–0 | 0–3 | 1–1 | 3–2 | — | 2–4 | 0–1 | 0–0 |
| Motril | 2–2 | 1–1 | 0–1 | 0–2 | 0–1 | 2–2 | 0–2 | 0–2 | 1–2 | 1–3 | 0–4 | 1–1 | 0–0 | 0–1 | 0–1 | 2–0 | 1–3 | — | 3–3 | 2–1 |
| Sevilla B | 0–0 | 2–1 | 1–1 | 2–1 | 0–0 | 2–1 | 1–1 | 0–1 | 0–2 | 3–1 | 0–1 | 1–1 | 0–0 | 0–0 | 0–1 | 2–2 | 0–0 | 2–0 | — | 0–0 |
| Torredonjimeno | 3–1 | 0–0 | 1–3 | 2–2 | 0–0 | 1–1 | 0–3 | 3–0 | 2–3 | 0–1 | 4–2 | 1–2 | 1–1 | 0–1 | 0–1 | 1–0 | 2–1 | 1–2 | 1–2 | — |

Source: BDFutbol
Legend: Blue = home team win; Yellow = draw; Red = away team win.

=== Top goalscorers ===
| Goalscorers | Goals | Team |
|---|---|---|
| (Switzerland) Alexandre Geijo | 16 | Málaga B |
| (Spain) Francisco Nogueira | 16 | Ciudad Murcia |
| (Spain) Julio Cobos | 14 | Cacereño |
| (Spain) Nacho Garrido | 14 | Cacereño |
| (Spain) Tati Maldonado | 13 | Betis B |

== Play-out ==
=== Semifinal ===
| Team 1 | Agg. | Team 2 | 1st leg | 2nd leg |
|---|---|---|---|---|
| Linares | 6–3 | Langreo | 2–2 | 4–1 |
| Calahorra | 0–3 | Figueres | 0–2 | 0–1 |

=== Final ===
| Team 1 | Agg. | Team 2 | 1st leg | 2nd leg |
|---|---|---|---|---|
| Langreo | 1–2 | Calahorra | 0–0 | 1–2 |
