= 2003–04 Segunda División B =

Segunda División B
- Season: 2003–04
- Promoted: Pontevedra; Racing Ferrol; Lleida; Gimnàstic de Tarragona
- Relegated: Logroñés; Racing de Santander B Calahorra; Caudal; Real Avilés; Casetas; Toledo; Compostela; Rayo Majadahonda; Valencia B Mataró; Yeclano; Palamós; Cacereño; Mérida; Villanovense; Los Palacios; Betis B
- Top goalscorer: Rubén Carreño (22 goals)
- Best goalkeeper: Santi Lampón (0.51 goals)
- Biggest home win: Vecindario 7–1 Villanovense (29 February 2004)
- Biggest away win: Real Avilés 0–6 Real Sociedad B (16 April 2004)
- Highest scoring: Calahorra 6–3 Pontevedra (11 April 2004)

The season 2003–04 of Segunda División B of Spanish football started August 2003 and ended May 2004.

== Summary before the 2003–04 season ==
Playoffs de Ascenso:

- Universidad de Las Palmas
- Zamora
- Lanzarote
- Pontevedra
- Real Unión
- Barakaldo
- Logroñés
- Athletic Bilbao B
- Castellón
- Barcelona B
- Burgos
- Gramenet
- Algeciras (P)
- Málaga B (P)
- Ciudad de Murcia (P)
- Cádiz (P)

Relegated from Segunda División:

- Compostela
- Racing Ferrol
- Oviedo (relegated to Tercera División)
- Badajoz

Promoted from Tercera División:

- Girona (from Group 5)
- Villajoyosa (from Group 6)
- San Sebastián de los Reyes (from Group 7)
- Fuenlabrada (from Group 7)
- Rayo Majadahonda (from Group 7)
- Palencia (from Group 8)
- Marbella (from Group 9)
- Los Palacios (from Group 10)
- Vecindario (from Group 12)
- Lorca Deportiva (from Group 13)
- Yeclano (from Group 13)
- Villanovense (from Group 14)
- Mirandés (from Group 15)
- Alfaro (from Group 15)
- Recreación (from Group 15)
- Casetas (from Group 16)
- Tomelloso (from Group 17)

Relegated:

- Marino de Luanco
- Lugo
- Real Ávila
- Ribadesella
- Gernika
- Noja
- Peralta
- Binéfar
- Gavà
- Reus
- L'Hospitalet
- Orihuela
- Díter Zafra
- Moralo
- Torredonjimeno
- Motril
- Langreo

Administrative relegation:

- Aurrerá (financial trouble)

Occupied the vacant spots by administrative relegations:

- Caudal (occupied the vacant spot of Real Oviedo)
- Real Sociedad B (occupied the vacant spot of Aurrerá)

== Group I ==
Teams from Asturias, Basque Country, Cantabria, Galicia, La Rioja and Navarre.

=== Teams ===
Location of teams in Segunda División B Gr. 1 2003–04

Team	Founded	Home city	Stadium
Alavés B	1960	Vitoria, Basque Country	José Luis Compañón
Alfaro	1922	Alfaro, La Rioja	La Molineta
Amurrio	1949	Amurrio, Basque Country	Basarte
Athletic Bilbao B	1964	Bilbao, Basque Country	Lezama
Real Avilés Industrial	1903	Avilés, Asturias	Román Suárez Puerta
Barakaldo	1917	Barakaldo, Basque Country	Lasesarre
Calahorra	1946	Calahorra, La Rioja	La Planilla
Caudal	1918	Mieres, Asturias	Hermanos Antuña
Celta de Vigo B	1927	Vigo, Galicia	Barreiro
Gimnástica Torrelavega	1907	Torrelavega, Cantabria	El Malecón
Logroñés	1940	Logroño, La Rioja	Las Gaunas
Osasuna B	1962	Aranguren, Navarre	Tajonar
Ourense	1952	Ourense, Galicia	O Couto
Peña Sport	1925	Tafalla, Navarre	San Francisco
Pontevedra	1941	Pontevedra, Galicia	Pasarón
Racing de Ferrol	1919	Ferrol, Galicia	A Malata
Racing Santander B	1926	Santander, Cantabria	La Albericia
Real Sociedad B	1951	Usurbil, Basque Country	Zubieta
Real Unión	1915	Irún, Basque Country	Stadium Gal
Recreación	2000	Logroño, La Rioja	Las Gaunas

=== League table ===
Pos	Team	Pld	W	D	L	GF	GA	GD	Pts
1	Pontevedra CF	38	21	9	8	72	51	+21	72
2	Racing de Ferrol	38	19	12	7	52	31	+21	69
3	Celta de Vigo B	38	16	14	8	50	31	+19	62
4	CD Ourense	38	16	13	9	50	36	+14	61
5	CD Recreación	38	18	6	14	50	51	−1	60
6	Deportivo Alavés B	38	17	7	14	50	48	+2	58
7	Amurrio Club	38	15	13	10	54	43	+11	58
8	Gim. Torrelavega	38	14	15	9	31	24	+7	57
9	CD Alfaro	38	14	11	13	41	32	+9	53
10	Real Sociedad B	38	14	11	13	45	39	+6	53
11	Athletic de Bilbao B	38	12	14	12	46	43	+3	50
12	Real Unión Club	38	13	10	15	46	43	+3	49
13	CA Osasuna B	38	12	12	14	37	43	−6	48
14	Barakaldo CF	38	10	17	11	34	35	−1	47
15	CD Logroñés (R)	38	11	14	13	43	46	−3	47
16	CD Peña Sport	38	11	13	14	44	56	−12	46
17	Racing de Santander B (R)	38	10	15	13	45	54	−9	45
18	CD Calahorra (R)	38	8	13	17	45	61	−16	37
19	Caudal Deportivo (R)	38	4	12	22	36	69	−33	24
20	Real Avilés Industrial (R)	38	4	11	23	23	58	−35	23

Source: BDFutbol
(R) Relegated

=== Results ===
Home \ Away	ALV	ALF	AMU	ATH	AVI	BAR	CAL	CAU	CEL	GIM	LOG	OSA	OUR	PEÑ	PON	RFE	RSA	RSO	RUN	REC
Alavés B	—	1–1	3–2	0–0	1–0	2–1	3–1	3–1	0–2	1–2	1–0	0–2	1–2	3–0	2–1	1–0	1–2	0–0	0–2	0–2
Alfaro	4–1	—	2–1	1–1	1–1	0–1	0–1	2–2	0–2	2–0	0–1	0–0	3–1	3–0	1–1	1–0	0–0	3–0	1–0	2–2
Amurrio	1–1	1–0	—	1–1	0–0	0–0	3–1	2–1	0–0	2–0	1–1	2–2	0–1	0–0	3–2	2–2	4–1	1–3	1–2	3–0
Athletic Bilbao B	0–3	0–0	0–2	—	2–1	1–1	3–0	4–0	2–1	0–0	2–0	1–1	0–0	5–1	0–0	1–1	2–0	0–0	2–1	2–3
Real Avilés Ind.	1–2	0–1	1–0	1–1	—	1–0	1–1	2–2	1–2	0–0	1–1	1–2	0–2	2–0	0–2	0–2	0–1	0–6	0–2	0–1
Barakaldo	3–0	2–1	1–3	3–4	1–1	—	1–1	2–1	1–0	1–0	0–0	2–0	0–0	2–0	1–1	2–2	2–0	0–0	1–1	0–0
Calahorra	2–3	1–0	4–1	1–0	0–0	1–2	—	2–0	0–3	1–0	2–2	0–0	0–0	2–2	6–3	0–3	2–2	2–3	1–1	0–3
Caudal	0–2	0–0	1–2	0–2	1–1	0–0	1–1	—	1–2	0–0	1–1	3–0	0–1	1–3	1–1	0–1	0–1	1–0	1–1	2–1
Celta Vigo B	0–2	1–0	1–0	2–2	2–0	0–0	1–2	3–1	—	0–0	0–0	1–1	2–3	3–2	2–3	0–0	1–1	3–2	1–0	4–0
Gim. Torrelavega	2–2	2–1	1–0	2–0	2–0	1–0	1–0	0–0	0–0	—	2–0	1–1	1–1	1–1	0–1	1–0	1–0	0–0	1–0	4–0
Logroñés	2–3	0–2	0–1	3–0	1–2	0–0	2–2	4–2	1–1	1–0	—	2–2	2–1	2–2	3–0	0–2	2–0	1–1	2–1	0–1
Osasuna B	0–1	0–1	0–1	1–0	2–1	1–0	3–2	1–0	1–3	3–0	1–0	—	1–0	0–0	3–1	0–1	1–3	1–1	1–0	0–0
Ourense	3–0	1–0	3–3	1–0	3–0	1–1	2–0	2–1	0–0	1–1	1–0	1–1	—	3–0	1–1	1–1	0–0	2–5	1–2	3–1
Peña Sport	1–0	1–1	1–2	1–3	2–1	1–0	0–0	5–1	1–1	2–0	1–2	1–0	2–0	—	0–2	0–0	1–1	3–0	3–1	1–1
Pontevedra	2–1	2–0	1–4	4–1	1–0	1–0	2–1	5–1	2–1	1–1	2–2	3–2	2–0	2–2	—	2–1	4–2	5–1	2–0	1–0
Racing Ferrol	2–1	1–0	1–1	1–0	3–1	2–0	2–2	2–1	1–1	1–3	3–0	1–0	3–2	2–1	2–2	—	2–0	0–1	2–1	1–0
Racing Santander B	2–2	2–1	3–0	1–1	1–1	2–2	2–0	2–2	0–1	1–0	2–0	1–1	1–5	1–1	2–3	1–1	—	1–1	0–0	3–5
Real Sociedad B	0–0	0–2	0–0	3–1	3–0	1–1	1–0	2–1	0–0	0–1	0–1	4–0	0–1	2–1	0–2	1–0	0–1	—	3–1	0–1
Real Unión	1–3	1–2	1–1	1–2	2–0	2–0	3–2	2–3	1–0	0–0	1–1	2–1	0–0	6–0	2–1	0–0	2–1	0–1	—	1–1
Recreación	1–0	1–2	1–3	1–0	2–1	3–0	2–1	4–2	0–3	0–0	2–3	2–1	1–0	0–1	2–1	1–3	2–1	2–0	1–2	—

Source: BDFutbol
Legend: Blue = home team win; Yellow = draw; Red = away team win.

=== Top goalscorers ===
Goalscorers	Team	Goals
(Spain) Rubén Carreño	CD Calahorra	22
(Spain) Nacho García	CD Ourense	18
(Spain) Gorka Azkorra	Athletic Bilbao B	17
(Spain) Javi Rodríguez	Pontevedra CF	16
(Spain) Nacho Franco	Celta de Vigo B	15

== Group II ==
Teams from Aragon, Castilla–La Mancha, Castile and León, Community of Madrid and Galicia.

=== Teams ===
Location of teams in Segunda División B Gr. 2 2003–04

Team	Founded	Home city	Stadium
RSD Alcalá	1929	Alcalá, Madrid	El Val
Alcorcón	1971	Alcorcón, Madrid	Santo Domingo
Atlético de Madrid B	1960	Majadahonda, Madrid	Cerro del Espino
Burgos	1994	Burgos, Castile and León	El Plantío
Casetas	1922	Casetas, Aragon	San Miguel
Compostela	1962	Santiago de Compostela, Galicia	San Lázaro
Conquense	1946	Cuenca, Castilla–La Mancha	La Fuensanta
Cultural Leonesa	1923	León, Castile and León	Reino de León
Fuenlabrada	1975	Fuenlabrada, Madrid	La Aldehuela
Mirandés	1927	Miranda de Ebro, Castile and León	Anduva
Palencia	1975	Palencia, Castile and León	La Balastera
Ponferradina	1922	Ponferrada, Castile and León	El Toralín
Rayo Majadahonda	1974	Majadahonda, Madrid	Cerro del Espino
Real Madrid B	1930	Madrid, Madrid	Ciudad Deportiva, Madrid
San Sebastián de los Reyes	1971	San Sebastián de los Reyes, Madrid	Nuevo Matapiñonera
Talavera	1948	Talavera de la Reina, Castilla–La Mancha	El Prado
Toledo	1928	Toledo, Castilla–La Mancha	Salto del Caballo
Tomelloso	1979	Tomelloso, Castilla–La Mancha	Paco Gálvez
Zamora	1968	Zamora, Castile and León	Ruta de la Plata
Zaragoza B	1958	Zaragoza, Aragon	Ciudad Deportiva del Real Zaragoza

=== League table ===
Pos	Team	Pld	W	D	L	GF	GA	GD	Pts
1	Atlético Madrid B	38	22	7	9	54	28	+26	73
2	Real Madrid B	38	21	7	10	55	32	+23	70
3	CD Mirandés	38	20	8	10	51	35	+16	68
4	Cultural Leonesa	38	20	8	10	52	30	+22	68
5	Burgos CF	38	17	14	7	50	33	+17	65
6	UB Conquense	38	16	12	10	57	41	+16	60
7	SD Ponferradina	38	17	9	12	39	30	+9	60
8	Zamora CF	38	16	7	15	50	40	+10	55
9	CF Fuenlabrada	38	16	6	16	54	58	−4	54
10	AD Alcorcón	38	12	16	10	34	34	0	52
11	Talavera CF	38	14	9	15	28	32	−4	51
12	CF Palencia	38	13	12	13	33	35	−2	51
13	UD SS de los Reyes	38	13	11	14	46	49	−3	50
14	Real Zaragoza B	38	13	10	15	39	38	+1	49
15	Tomelloso CF	38	12	12	14	29	39	−10	48
16	RSD Alcalá	38	10	14	14	33	35	−2	44
17	UD Casetas (R)	38	7	14	17	32	60	−28	35
18	CD Toledo (R)	38	9	8	21	33	54	−21	35
19	SD Compostela (R)	38	8	10	20	33	58	−25	31 (Note: 3 points deducted because of not playing a fixture against UB Conquense.)
20	CF Rayo Majadahonda (R)	38	2	10	26	29	70	−41	16

Source: BDFutbol
(R) Relegated

=== Results ===
Home \ Away	ALCL	ALCR	ATL	BUR	CST	COM	COQ	CUL	FUE	MIR	PAL	PON	RMJ	RMA	SAS	TAL	TOL	TOM	ZAM	ZAR
Alcalá	—	2–1	0–0	0–1	0–1	1–1	1–0	1–3	3–0	0–2	1–1	1–2	3–0	0–1	1–1	0–0	3–0	0–1	1–0	1–1
Alcorcón	0–0	—	1–0	0–0	4–1	2–0	0–2	0–0	1–1	1–2	1–1	0–0	0–0	0–4	4–1	0–1	0–0	1–1	2–1	2–1
Atlético Madrid B	3–0	0–1	—	1–1	0–0	0–0	2–1	2–0	3–2	1–2	1–0	2–0	2–0	1–0	1–0	3–0	0–1	0–2	2–0	1–0
Burgos	1–1	3–0	1–3	—	2–0	1–0	1–5	0–1	4–0	3–1	1–0	4–1	1–0	0–0	2–1	1–0	3–0	2–0	2–0	3–1
Casetas	0–3	1–1	0–1	2–2	—	3–3	3–1	0–1	2–1	0–2	0–2	0–2	2–1	0–2	1–4	2–2	1–0	0–0	0–0	1–1
Compostela	1–0	2–0	1–1	0–2	2–3	—	0–0	0–1	4–3	1–0	0–0	0–2	1–1	2–0	1–1	1–3	2–0	4–1	1–2	0–2
Conquense	1–1	0–0	1–2	1–1	3–0	3–0	—	0–0	2–5	2–0	1–0	3–1	2–1	2–0	4–0	3–0	0–0	1–1	3–1	2–1
Cultural Leonesa	3–1	0–0	2–0	0–0	4–0	4–0	1–2	—	1–2	0–0	2–0	0–2	3–2	0–2	1–2	2–0	3–0	2–0	3–2	1–1
Fuenlabrada	2–1	2–1	0–3	3–2	2–2	2–0	2–2	1–2	—	1–0	1–0	0–0	5–1	1–0	0–4	0–0	2–1	1–0	4–0	0–2
Mirandés	2–1	1–1	0–1	0–0	1–2	3–1	0–0	3–1	2–1	—	1–0	1–0	2–1	2–2	1–2	0–1	2–0	4–0	0–0	1–1
Palencia	0–0	1–1	3–2	1–1	1–1	1–0	1–0	1–0	1–2	0–2	—	1–0	2–1	2–1	1–1	0–1	3–1	0–1	2–1	0–1
Ponferradina	0–1	0–0	1–2	0–0	2–0	4–0	1–0	0–0	0–3	1–2	1–2	—	2–1	1–3	1–1	2–0	1–0	2–0	0–0	1–0
Rayo Majadahonda	1–1	0–3	1–1	1–1	1–1	1–1	1–2	1–3	3–3	2–3	0–0	0–1	—	0–2	1–0	0–3	1–2	0–1	1–2	1–3
Real Madrid B	2–0	2–1	1–1	4–0	2–0	2–0	3–1	2–2	0–1	2–1	1–0	1–0	2–0	—	3–3	2–0	1–0	1–1	2–1	2–1
San Sebast. Reyes	0–0	3–0	2–1	0–0	2–1	2–0	0–2	1–0	2–1	0–0	4–1	0–3	2–1	1–2	—	0–0	3–4	0–1	0–2	0–2
Talavera	1–1	0–1	1–3	0–1	1–0	2–1	0–0	0–1	1–0	1–2	0–0	0–1	1–0	0–0	1–0	—	0–2	0–0	2–0	3–0
Toledo	0–1	0–1	1–3	1–1	0–0	1–1	2–1	1–2	2–0	1–2	1–1	0–1	0–1	2–1	1–1	1–2	—	5–1	0–2	0–2
Tomelloso	1–0	0–1	0–1	1–1	1–1	0–1	2–2	0–2	2–0	3–1	0–1	0–0	0–0	2–0	0–1	1–0	1–1	—	1–1	1–0
Zamora	0–0	1–2	0–3	3–1	3–1	2–1	6–1	1–0	3–0	0–1	1–1	0–1	3–1	2–0	3–0	0–1	4–0	2–0	—	0–0
Zaragoza B	1–2	0–0	2–1	1–0	0–0	2–0	1–1	0–1	1–0	1–2	1–2	2–2	4–1	1–0	1–1	1–0	0–2	0–2	0–1	—

Source: BDFutbol
Legend: Blue = home team win; Yellow = draw; Red = away team win.

=== Top goalscorers ===
Goalscorers	Team	Goals
(Spain) Paulino Martínez	Cultural Leonesa	21
(Spain) Toché	Atlético Madrid B	19
(Spain) David Gallo	CD Mirandés	19
(Spain) Riki	Real Madrid B	18
(Spain) Sergio Francisco	Zamora CF	18

== Group III ==
Teams from Balearic Islands, Catalonia, Region of Murcia and Valencian Community.

=== Teams ===
Location of teams in Segunda División B Gr. 3 2003–04

Team	Founded	Home city	Stadium
Alicante	1918	Alicante, Valencian Community	José Rico Pérez
Barcelona B	1970	Barcelona, Catalonia	Mini Estadi
Cartagonova	1995	Cartagena, Region of Murcia	Cartagonova
Castellón	1922	Castellón de la Plana, Valencian Community	Nou Castàlia
Espanyol B	1981	Sant Adrià de Besòs, Catalonia	Ciutat Esportiva RCD Espanyol
Figueres	1919	Figueres, Catalonia	Vilatenim
Gimnàstic de Tarragona	1886	Tarragona, Catalonia	Nou Estadi
Girona	1930	Girona, Catalonia	Montilivi
Gramenet	1994	Santa Coloma de Gramenet, Catalonia	Nou Camp Municipal
Hércules Alicante	1922	Alicante, Valencian Community	José Rico Pérez
Lleida	1947	Lleida, Catalonia	Camp d'Esports
Lorca	2002	Lorca, Region of Murcia	Francisco Artés Carrasco
Mallorca B	1967	Palma, Balearic Islands	Lluís Sitjar
Mataró	1939	Mataró, Catalonia	Camp del Centenari
Novelda	1925	Novelda, Valencian Community	La Magdalena
Palamós	1898	Palamós, Catalonia	Nou Municipal
Sabadell	1903	Sabadell, Catalonia	Nova Creu Alta
Valencia B	1944	Valencia, Valencian Community	Ciudad Deportiva de Paterna
Villajoyosa	1944	Villajoyosa, Valencian Community	Nou Pla
Yeclano	1950	Yecla, Region of Murcia	La Constitución

=== League table ===
Pos	Team	Pld	W	D	L	GF	GA	GD	Pts
1	UE Lleida	38	20	8	10	47	36	+11	68
2	Lorca Deportiva CF	38	18	13	7	54	32	+22	67
3	Gimnás. Tarragona	38	19	10	9	59	32	+27	67
4	CD Castellón	38	20	7	11	49	32	+17	67
5	UDA Gramenet	38	20	5	13	48	39	+9	65
6	Alicante CF	38	19	8	11	53	29	+24	65
7	Girona FC	38	17	10	11	58	41	+17	61
8	FC Barcelona B	38	16	10	12	39	27	+12	58
9	Hércules CF	38	13	16	9	51	40	+11	55
10	Novelda CF	38	15	10	13	41	40	+1	55
11	RCD Espanyol B	38	14	9	15	59	60	−1	51
12	Villajoyosa CF	38	14	9	15	33	40	−7	51
13	UE Figueres	38	12	12	14	29	40	−11	48
14	RCD Mallorca B	38	13	8	17	41	51	−10	47
15	Cartagonova FC	38	11	13	14	32	43	−11	46
16	CE Sabadell FC	38	13	7	18	36	45	−9	46
17	Valencia CF B (R)	38	12	8	18	43	56	−13	44
18	CE Mataró (R)	38	8	9	21	39	52	−13	33
19	Yeclano CF (R)	38	7	9	22	22	50	−28	30
20	Palamós CF (R)	38	5	7	26	22	70	−48	22

Source: BDFutbol
(R) Relegated

=== Results ===
Home \ Away	ALI	BAR	CAR	CAS	ESP	FIG	GIM	GIR	GRA	HER	LLE	LOR	MAL	MAT	NOV	PAL	SAB	VAL	VIJ	YEC
Alicante	—	1–0	1–1	1–1	1–1	1–2	2–2	2–1	2–0	2–1	0–1	3–1	3–0	1–0	1–0	2–0	1–2	2–0	5–0	0–0
Barcelona B	2–1	—	3–0	0–2	2–1	3–0	1–0	0–1	2–0	0–0	0–0	0–0	0–1	1–0	1–2	2–0	2–0	2–2	0–1	1–1
Cartagonova	0–1	1–0	—	1–2	1–1	0–0	0–1	1–1	1–0	1–1	3–1	0–3	2–1	0–1	0–0	2–0	0–0	3–2	1–0	3–0
Castellón	0–0	0–2	1–0	—	2–1	2–0	0–0	1–5	3–0	0–2	0–1	0–1	1–0	3–1	3–1	3–0	2–1	2–3	3–0	1–0
Espanyol B	2–4	2–1	4–2	1–2	—	1–2	2–1	0–0	1–2	0–1	2–4	2–2	0–0	2–1	1–2	2–2	1–2	1–0	2–1	4–2
Figueres	0–5	0–0	1–0	0–1	1–3	—	0–0	2–1	1–1	0–0	1–1	1–2	2–0	2–1	1–0	1–0	2–1	1–2	0–0	3–0
Gim. Tarragona	0–1	0–0	1–0	2–2	2–2	2–1	—	6–0	0–1	1–2	2–1	1–0	4–1	1–0	2–2	1–0	3–0	3–0	0–2	0–0
Girona	0–2	1–0	1–1	1–1	4–2	3–0	1–3	—	0–1	0–0	0–0	2–0	2–1	1–0	4–1	6–0	2–0	3–0	1–4	1–1
Gramenet	3–0	1–1	1–1	1–1	2–0	1–0	0–2	2–0	—	2–0	5–0	2–1	1–0	0–0	0–1	1–0	1–2	1–0	2–0	1–0
Hércules	0–3	2–2	1–3	1–0	0–0	0–0	0–0	1–1	3–4	—	0–1	0–1	5–3	3–0	0–1	4–0	2–1	2–0	3–1	0–0
Lleida	1–0	0–1	5–0	0–1	2–1	1–0	0–3	1–2	3–0	2–2	—	1–1	1–0	3–1	2–1	1–0	1–0	1–3	0–1	2–1
Lorca	1–0	4–1	0–0	1–0	3–1	4–0	1–0	1–1	3–2	2–2	1–2	—	2–0	1–0	1–0	2–2	3–0	2–1	0–0	0–0
Mallorca B	2–0	0–2	0–0	0–1	0–1	1–1	0–0	1–0	1–3	4–2	2–1	1–1	—	1–2	1–1	3–2	1–0	2–1	2–1	1–2
Mataró	1–1	0–2	4–0	1–0	1–3	1–1	5–2	0–0	0–2	0–1	1–2	1–4	1–2	—	1–1	4–0	0–1	1–1	1–2	2–1
Novelda	2–0	0–0	0–1	1–1	0–0	0–1	3–2	2–1	1–0	0–4	1–1	0–1	2–2	0–2	—	2–0	1–0	2–0	3–1	2–0
Palamós	0–0	0–2	0–0	1–3	3–2	1–0	1–6	0–2	0–1	1–1	0–2	0–0	2–1	1–0	1–0	—	0–2	1–2	1–2	1–2
Sabadell	1–0	1–2	0–2	0–1	3–4	0–0	0–1	2–0	2–1	1–1	0–0	1–0	1–3	2–2	1–1	2–1	—	0–1	2–1	0–1
Valencia B	0–1	1–0	1–1	0–3	1–3	0–0	1–2	2–5	4–1	1–2	0–1	1–1	1–2	2–2	2–1	3–1	1–1	—	0–0	1–0
Villajoyosa	1–0	1–0	2–0	1–0	1–2	1–0	0–1	0–2	2–0	0–0	0–0	2–2	0–0	2–1	0–2	0–0	0–2	0–1	—	3–1
Yeclano	0–3	0–1	2–0	1–0	0–1	0–2	0–2	0–2	1–2	2–2	0–1	2–1	0–1	0–0	1–2	1–0	0–2	0–2	0–0	—

Source: BDFutbol
Legend: Blue = home team win; Yellow = draw; Red = away team win.

=== Top goalscorers ===
Goalscorers	Team	Goals
(Spain) Diego Torres	Gimnàstic de Tarragona	20
(Spain) Coro	RCD Espanyol B	19
(Spain) Jordi Martínez	CE Mataró	18
(Spain) Aitor Huegún	Lorca Deportiva CF	17
(Spain) Sergio García	FC Barcelona B	15

== Group IV ==
Teams from Andalucia, Canary Islands, Ceuta, Extremadura and Melilla.

=== Teams ===
Location of teams in Segunda División B Gr. 4 2003–04
Canary Islands

Team	Founded	Home city	Stadium
Badajoz	1905	Badajoz, Extremadura	Nuevo Vivero
Real Betis B	1962	Seville, Andalusia	Ciudad Deportiva Ruíz de Lopera
Cacereño	1919	Cáceres, Extremadura	Príncipe Felipe
Ceuta	1996	Ceuta	Alfonso Murube
CD Corralejo	1975	Corralejo, Canary Islands	Vicente Carreño Alonso
Écija	1939	Écija, Andalusia	San Pablo
Extremadura	1924	Almendralejo, Extremadura	Francisco de la Hera
Real Jaén	1922	Jaén, Andalusia	Nuevo La Victoria
Jerez	1969	Jerez de los Caballeros, Extremadura	Manuel Calzado Galván
Lanzarote	1970	Arrecife, Canary Islands	Ciudad Deportiva de Lanzarote
Linares	1990	Linares, Andalusia	Linarejos
Los Palacios	1964	Los Palacios y Villafranca, Andalusia	Las Marismas
Marbella	1997	Marbella, Andalusia	Municipal Marbella
Melilla	1976	Melilla	Álvarez Claro
Mérida	1990	Mérida, Extremadura	Romano
Pájara Playas de Jandía	1996	Pájara, Canary Islands	Benito Alonso
Sevilla B	1958	Seville, Andalusia	José Ramón Cisneros Palacios
Universidad Las Palmas	1994	Las Palmas, Canary Islands	Alfonso Silva
Vecindario	1962	Vecindario, Canary Islands	Municipal de Vecindario
Villanovense	1992	Villanueva de la Serena, Extremadura	Romero Cuerda

=== League table ===
Pos	Team	Pld	W	D	L	GF	GA	GD	Pts
1	UD Lanzarote	38	19	9	10	59	29	+30	66
2	UD Pájara Playas Jandía	38	19	8	11	48	41	+7	65
3	Sevilla FC B	38	19	7	12	44	29	+15	64
4	CD Badajoz	38	18	10	10	54	45	+9	64
5	UD Vecindario	38	15	18	5	41	20	+21	63
6	AD Ceuta	38	15	14	9	40	31	+9	59
7	UD Melilla	38	14	17	7	42	32	+10	59
8	Jerez CF	38	15	13	10	35	29	+6	58
9	Écija Balompié	38	15	13	10	45	33	+12	58
10	Universidad Las Palmas	38	16	9	13	39	27	+12	57
11	CD Linares	38	13	13	12	31	32	−1	52
12	Real Jaén	38	14	9	15	39	36	+3	51
13	CF Extremadura	38	13	10	15	45	44	+1	49
14	CD Corralejo	38	12	12	14	37	43	−6	48
15	UD Marbella	38	12	11	15	42	48	−6	47
16	Real Betis B	38	11	8	19	43	55	−12	41
17	CP Cacereño (R)	38	10	8	20	32	51	−19	38
18	Mérida UD (R)	38	8	11	19	21	48	−27	35
19	CF Villanovense (R)	38	8	9	21	35	69	−34	33
20	UD Los Palacios (R)	38	4	11	23	21	51	−30	23

Source: BDFutbol
(R) Relegated

=== Results ===
Home \ Away	BAD	BET	CAC	CEU	CRL	ECI	EXT	JAE	JER	LAN	LIN	LPC	MAR	MEL	MER	PAJ	SEV	ULP	VEC	VNV
Badajoz	—	0–5	1–2	3–0	2–1	2–0	3–0	1–0	0–0	4–2	2–1	2–0	3–0	1–2	2–1	3–1	2–1	1–0	0–1	2–2
Betis B	2–2	—	1–2	1–3	2–1	1–2	2–2	4–0	0–1	0–1	1–0	1–0	1–0	1–0	0–0	1–1	1–0	0–1	0–0	4–1
Cacereño	0–1	2–0	—	2–1	0–0	0–0	0–1	3–2	1–3	0–3	0–1	1–1	2–1	1–1	3–1	2–4	1–0	1–0	0–2	2–3
Ceuta	1–0	3–1	2–0	—	0–0	1–1	1–0	1–0	3–0	0–0	3–1	3–1	0–1	1–0	0–0	2–3	2–1	1–0	1–1	0–1
Corralejo	0–0	2–1	1–0	0–0	—	2–1	1–0	1–0	2–1	0–2	3–1	2–0	0–1	1–1	5–1	0–1	0–1	1–0	0–3	1–1
Écija	2–0	3–0	0–0	1–1	0–2	—	2–1	1–0	0–1	0–2	5–1	1–0	2–0	3–1	2–1	0–2	1–1	0–2	1–1	5–1
Extremadura	1–1	3–2	3–0	1–1	1–1	0–3	—	2–1	3–1	1–0	0–1	4–1	1–2	1–1	1–2	0–2	4–0	2–0	0–2	1–1
Real Jaén	0–2	4–0	2–0	1–1	1–0	1–1	1–2	—	0–0	0–1	1–0	1–0	2–0	2–0	0–1	5–1	2–1	1–0	0–0	1–1
Jerez	1–1	2–1	0–0	0–0	0–2	1–1	1–0	2–1	—	1–0	1–0	1–0	2–0	0–0	2–0	1–0	1–1	2–0	0–0	3–1
Lanzarote	1–2	2–0	3–3	0–0	4–0	0–0	3–1	3–0	1–0	—	2–1	4–0	1–3	0–1	1–0	6–1	4–0	1–1	0–0	2–0
Linares	1–0	3–1	1–0	1–1	2–0	2–1	1–0	0–0	2–1	1–1	—	1–0	1–1	0–0	0–0	1–1	0–2	1–0	1–0	1–1
Los Palacios	1–1	1–1	1–2	1–2	1–1	1–1	0–0	1–3	1–0	0–1	0–0	—	0–0	1–2	1–0	0–1	0–1	3–0	1–1	2–0
Marbella	1–1	2–3	2–0	1–2	1–1	0–0	2–1	0–2	1–1	2–2	0–4	2–0	—	2–2	4–0	3–0	1–0	0–2	0–0	2–0
Melilla	4–0	2–1	2–1	0–0	3–0	0–0	1–1	0–0	0–1	2–1	0–0	1–1	2–2	—	2–0	1–0	1–0	1–4	0–0	3–2
Mérida	0–1	2–1	2–0	1–0	0–0	0–2	0–2	0–1	1–1	1–1	0–0	1–0	2–1	1–1	—	0–0	0–0	0–2	0–0	1–0
Pájara Playas	4–1	1–1	1–0	1–2	3–1	3–0	0–1	2–1	2–1	1–0	2–0	1–0	0–1	1–1	1–0	—	0–0	1–1	0–1	2–1
Sevilla B	4–2	0–0	1–0	2–0	3–1	2–0	1–1	2–0	0–0	2–0	1–0	2–0	1–0	0–1	4–0	1–2	—	1–0	3–1	1–0
Universidad Las Palmas	0–0	5–1	1–0	1–1	1–1	0–1	1–0	1–1	1–0	1–0	0–0	4–1	1–1	1–0	3–0	2–0	1–0	—	0–1	1–0
Vecindario	1–3	1–0	1–0	2–0	3–2	0–0	1–1	0–0	1–1	0–1	0–0	2–0	3–1	0–0	2–1	0–0	0–2	0–0	—	7–1
Villanovense	2–2	0–1	1–1	1–0	1–1	0–2	1–2	1–2	2–1	0–3	1–0	0–0	3–1	1–3	2–1	0–2	0–2	2–1	0–3	—

Source: BDFutbol
Legend: Blue = home team win; Yellow = draw; Red = away team win.

=== Top goalscorers ===
Goalscorers	Team	Goals
(Spain) Raúl Borrero	UD Pájara Playas de Jandía	19
(Spain) Tati Maldonado	Real Betis B	15
(Spain) Moncho	Écija Balompié	14
(Spain) Andrés Ramos	UD Marbella	14
(Spain) Mauri	UD Melilla	13

== Play-out ==
=== Semi-final ===
Team 1	Agg.	Team 2	1st leg	2nd leg
Betis B	1–4	Alcalá	1–2	0–2
Peña Sport	2–4	Sabadell	1–1	1–3

=== Final ===
Team 1	Agg.	Team 2	1st leg	2nd leg
Betis B	1–3	Peña Sport	1–2	0–1
