= 2002 Tercera División play-offs =

Spanish football league play-offs

The 2002 Tercera División play-offs to Segunda División B from Tercera División (Promotion play-offs) were the final playoffs for the promotion from 2001–02 Tercera División to 2002–03 Segunda División B. The first four teams of each group (excluding reserve teams) took part in the play-off.

== Group A-1 ==
	Alon	Avi	Mós	Sie
Alondras CF		2-0	0-1	3-2
Real Ávila CF	2-0		4-1	2-0
CD Móstoles	0-1	2-2		1-0
Club Siero	1-2	1-4	0-1	

P	Team	Pld	Pts	W	D	L	GF	GA
1	Ávila	6	13	4	1	1	14	6
2	Alondras	6	12	4	0	2	8	6
3	Móstoles	6	10	3	1	2	6	7
4	Siero	6	0	0	0	6	4	13

- Promoted to Segunda B: Ávila

== Group A-2 ==
	AvIn	Com	Nav	Pal
Avilés Ind. CF		2-0	2-0	1-0
Compostela B	2-2		1-1	1-1
CDA Navalcarnero	1-0	0-0		1-1
CF Palencia	1-1	2-1	2-1	

P	Team	Pld	Pts	W	D	L	GF	GA
1	Avilés Ind.	6	11	3	2	1	8	4
2	Palencia	6	9	2	3	1	7	6
3	Navalcarnero	6	6	1	3	2	4	6
4	Compostela B	6	4	0	4	2	5	8

- Promoted to Segunda B: Avilés Ind.

== Group A-3 ==
	Bet	GSe	Rib	Seb
Betanzos CF		1-0	0-1	1-1
Gim. Segoviana	1-4		0-1	2-2
Ribadesella CF	2-0	1-0		0-0
S.Sebast.Reyes	7-0	3-0	2-0	

P	Team	Pld	Pts	W	D	L	GF	GA
1	Ribadesella	6	13	4	1	1	5	2
2	S.Sebast.Reyes	6	12	3	3	0	15	3
3	Betanzos	6	7	2	1	3	6	12
4	Gim. Segoviana	6	1	0	1	5	3	12

- Promoted to Segunda B: Ribadesella

== Group A-4 ==
	Lan	LaR	Lem	Vll
UP Langreo		1-0	1-1	3-2
Las Rozas CF	0-0		1-0	1-0
Club Lemos	0-1	2-1		1-3
Real Valladolid B	2-0	0-0	3-0	

P	Team	Pld	Pts	W	D	L	GF	GA
1	Langreo	6	11	3	2	1	6	5
2	Valladolid B	6	10	3	1	2	10	5
3	Las Rozas	6	8	2	2	2	3	3
4	Lemos	6	4	1	1	4	4	10

- Promoted to Segunda B: Langreo

== Group B-1 ==
	Bur	Noja	SRC	Zue
UCD Burladés		0-1	1-2	1-2
SD Noja	1-0		1-0	6-1
Sestao River	1-1	2-2		3-0
CD Zuera	3-2	1-1	0-2	

P	Team	Pld	Pts	W	D	L	GF	GA
1	Noja	6	14	4	2	0	12	4
2	Sestao River	6	11	3	2	1	10	5
3	Zuera	6	7	2	1	3	7	15
4	Burladés	6	1	0	1	5	5	10

- Promoted to Segunda B: Noja

== Group B-2 ==
	Amo	Fra	RacB	Rec
SD Amorebieta		1-0	0-0	1-1
UD Fraga	6-1		1-1	0-4
Racing B	2-1	0-1		2-0
CD Recreación	1-1	0-0	0-1	

P	Team	Pld	Pts	W	D	L	GF	GA
1	Racing Sant. B	6	11	3	2	1	6	3
2	Fraga	6	8	2	2	2	8	7
3	Recreación	6	6	1	3	2	6	5
4	Amorebieta	6	6	1	3	2	5	10

- Promoted to Segunda B: Racing Sant. B

== Group B-3 ==
	Ebro	Lem	PñS	Tro
CD Ebro		0-1	0-3	2-1
SD Lemona	7-0		1-1	1-0
Peña Sport FC	3-1	0-0		0-0
CD Tropezón	1-0	1-0	0-2	

P	Team	Pld	Pts	W	D	L	GF	GA
1	Peña Sport	6	12	3	3	0	9	2
2	Lemona	6	11	3	2	1	10	2
3	Tropezón	6	7	2	1	3	3	5
4	Ebro	6	3	1	0	5	3	16

- Promoted to Segunda B: Peña Sport

== Group B-4 ==
	Azk	Bez	Ter	Zal
CD Azkoyen		2-1	1-2	0-0
CD Bezana	0-3		2-0	0-1
CD Teruel	1-3	3-4		2-3
Zalla UC	0-2	2-2	2-1	

P	Team	Pld	Pts	W	D	L	GF	GA
1	Azkoyen	6	13	4	1	1	11	4
2	Zalla	6	11	3	2	1	8	7
3	Bezana	6	7	2	1	3	9	11
4	Teruel	6	3	1	0	5	9	15

- Promoted to Segunda B: Azkoyen

== Group C-1 ==
	Bur	Gav	Lor	Vil
CD Burriana		0-1	0-0	2-0
CF Gavà	1-0		1-1	3-2
Lorca CF	3-0	2-0		4-0
CF Villafranca	0-1	0-3	1-1	

P	Team	Pld	Pts	W	D	L	GF	GA
1	Gavà	6	13	4	1	1	9	5
2	Lorca	6	12	3	3	0	11	2
3	Burriana	6	7	2	1	3	3	5
4	Villafranca	6	1	0	1	5	3	14

- Promoted to Segunda B: Gavà

== Group C-2 ==
	Águ	Brj	Pal	PñD
Águilas CF		2-0	1-0	3-2
Burjassot CF	0-0		1-3	2-2
Palamós CF	2-1	1-0		4-0
SCR Peña Deportiva	0-1	1-0	3-3	

P	Team	Pld	Pts	W	D	L	GF	GA
1	Palamós	6	13	4	1	1	13	6
2	Águilas	6	13	4	1	1	8	4
3	Santa Eulalia	6	5	1	2	3	8	13
4	Burjassot	6	2	0	2	4	3	9

- Promoted to Segunda B: Palamós

== Group C-3 ==
	ABl	Reu	Vlj	Yec
Atlético Baleares		1-1	0-2	0-0
CF Reus Deportiu	3-0		3-0	2-1
Villajoyosa CF	1-2	1-2		1-1
Yeclano CF	2-1	0-0	2-4	

P	Team	Pld	Pts	W	D	L	GF	GA
1	Reus	6	14	4	2	0	11	3
2	Villajoyosa	6	7	2	1	3	9	10
3	Yeclano	6	6	1	3	2	6	8
4	At. Baleares	6	5	1	2	3	4	9

- Promoted to Segunda B: Reus

== Group C-4 ==
	Con	Lev	Ori	SAn
CE Constància		0-1	0-0	2-2
Levante UD B	3-0		3-3	1-3
Orihuela CF	1-0	2-2		3-1
UE Sant Andreu	1-1	1-2	2-0	

P	Team	Pld	Pts	W	D	L	GF	GA
1	Levante B	6	11	3	2	1	12	9
2	Orihuela	6	9	2	3	1	9	8
3	Sant Andreu	6	8	2	2	2	10	9
4	Constancia	6	3	0	3	3	3	8

- Promoted to Segunda B: Orihuela
- Levante B not promoted, Levante relegated to Segunda B.

== Group D-1 ==
	Ant	Cac	Mál	QdR
CA Antoniano		3-2	0-0	2-0
CP Cacereño	4-1		3-2	1-1
Málaga CF B	3-0	1-2		1-0
CD Quintanar del Rey	0-1	2-1	1-3	

P	Team	Pld	Pts	W	D	L	GF	GA
1	Cacereño	6	10	3	1	2	13	10
2	Málaga B	6	10	3	1	2	10	6
3	Antoniano	6	10	3	1	2	7	9
4	Quintanar	6	4	1	1	4	4	9

- Promoted to Segunda B: Cacereño

== Group D-2 ==
	DBe	Lin	Rec	Vlr
CD Don Benito		0-0	0-0	1-1
CD Linares	2-0		0-0	0-0
RC Recreativo B	3-0	1-1		0-1
CP Villarrobledo	1-2	0-1	1-2	

P	Team	Pld	Pts	W	D	L	GF	GA
1	Linares	6	10	2	4	0	4	1
2	Recr. Huelva B	6	9	2	3	1	6	3
3	Don Benito	6	6	1	3	2	3	7
4	Villarrobledo	6	5	1	2	3	4	6

- Promoted to Segunda B: Linares

== Group D-3 ==
	Alb	Tdj	Vns	Vva
Albacete B		1-1	1-1	0-1
Torredonjimeno CF	2-0		1-0	1-0
CF Villanovense	2-2	1-3		2-1
CD Villanueva	4-0	4-2	3-0	

P	Team	Pld	Pts	W	D	L	GF	GA
1	Torredonjimeno	6	13	4	1	1	10	6
2	Villanueva	6	12	4	0	2	12	5
3	Albacete B	6	5	1	2	3	6	10
4	Villanovense	6	4	1	1	4	6	13

- Promoted to Segunda B: Torredonjimeno

== Group D-4 ==
	Jer	Már	Mor	Tom
Jerez Industrial CF		1-3	1-1	2-0
Mármol Macael CD	3-1		2-2	1-0
Moralo CP	2-1	1-0		2-0
Tomelloso CF	0-1	2-2	2-4	

P	Team	Pld	Pts	W	D	L	GF	GA
1	Moralo	6	14	4	2	0	12	6
2	Mármol Macael	6	11	3	2	1	11	7
3	Jerez Ind.	6	7	2	1	3	7	9
4	Tomelloso	6	1	0	1	5	4	12

- Promoted to Segunda B: Moralo

== Group E ==
	Cas	CD Corralejo	SBr	Tel
Castillo CF		0-3	2-2	4-1
CD Corralejo	0-0		4-2	3-1
CD Santa Brígida	3-2	1-0		0-0
UD Telde	0-1	0-2	0-2	

P	Team	Pld	Pts	W	D	L	GF	GA
1	Corralejo	6	13	4	1	1	12	4
2	Santa Brígida	6	11	3	2	1	10	8
3	Castillo	6	8	2	2	2	9	9
4	Telde	6	1	0	1	5	2	12

- Promoted to Segunda B: Corralejo
