= Xavi Oliva =

Spanish footballer

Personal information
- Full name: Javier Oliva González
- Date of birth: 29 May 1976 (age 50)
- Place of birth: L'Hospitalet, Spain
- Height: 1.90 m (6 ft 3 in)
- Position: Goalkeeper

Youth career
- Espanyol

Senior career*
Years	Team	Apps	(Gls)
1994	Espanyol B	0	(0)
1994–1997	Hospitalet	22	(0)
1995–1996	→ Roda Barà (loan)	18	(0)
1997–1998	Valencia B	19	(0)
1998–1999	Terrassa	35	(0)
1999–2000	Recreativo	5	(0)
2000–2002	Gimnàstic	48	(0)
2002–2009	Castellón	181	(0)
2009–2011	Villarreal	0	(0)
Total		328	(0)

Managerial career
- 2025–: MC Oran (assistant)
- * Club domestic league appearances and goals

Javier "Xavi" Oliva González (Catalan: [ˈʃaβi uˈliβə, -βi wˈ-], Spanish: [ˈʃaβj oˈliβa]; born 29 May 1976) is a Spanish retired footballer who played as a goalkeeper who works as an assistant manager for MC Oran.

== Football career ==
Oliva was born in L'Hospitalet de Llobregat, Barcelona, Catalonia. After modest beginnings (he had stints with RCD Espanyol and Valencia CF, but only with their reserves) his first professional spell was in the 1999–2000 season, as he played five matches with Recreativo de Huelva in the second division.

Oliva then represented Gimnàstic de Tarragona in his native region, in both the second and third levels, then moved to CD Castellón in 2002. With the latter, he was instrumental in a 2005 promotion to division two.

In the last two seasons, Oliva lost the starting job to former Real Madrid youth graduate Carlos Sánchez. After more than 200 overall appearances, he backed down on his decision to renew his contract and, in late June 2009, signed a two-year deal with La Liga club Villarreal CF also in the community. He made his official debut for his new team on 29 October, in a 1–1 away draw against CD Puertollano for the Copa del Rey; on 5 November, he replaced the injured Diego López during the 4–1 home win over S.S. Lazio for the group stage of the UEFA Europa League.

Oliva left Villarreal as a free agent in the summer of 2011, with no league appearances to his credit. He retired shortly after, at the age of 35.

== Career statitstics ==
Appearances and goals by club, season and competition
Club	Season	League			National cup		Europe		Other		Total	
Club	Season	Division	Apps	Goals	Apps	Goals	Apps	Goals	Apps	Goals	Apps	Goals
Hospitalet	1995–96	Segunda División B	2	0	—		—		—		2	0
Hospitalet	1996–97	Segunda División B	20	0	—		—		—		20	0
Hospitalet	Total		22	0	—		—		—		22	0
Valencia B	1997–98	Segunda División B	19	0	—		—		—		35	0
Terrassa	1998–99	Segunda División B	35	0	—		—		—		0	0
Recreativo	1999–2000	Segunda División	5	0	2	0	—		—		7	0
Gimnàstic	2000–01	Segunda División B	37	0	—		—		6	0	43	0
Gimnàstic	2001–02	Segunda División	11	0	1	0	—		—		12	0
Gimnàstic	Total		48	0	1	0	—		6	0	55	0
Castellón	2002–03	Segunda División B	35	0	—		—		6	0	41	0
Castellón	2003–04	Segunda División B	33	0	1	0	—		5	0	39	0
Castellón	2004–05	Segunda División B	37	0	3	0	—		4	0	44	0
Castellón	2005–06	Segunda División	17	0	0	0	—		—		17	0
Castellón	2006–07	Segunda División	40	0	1	0	—		—		41	0
Castellón	2007–08	Segunda División	9	0	1	0	—		—		10	0
Castellón	2008–09	Segunda División	10	0	3	0	—		—		13	0
Castellón	Total		181	0	9	0	—		15	0	205	0
Villarreal	2009–10	La Liga	0	0	2	0	2	0	—		4	0
Villarreal	2010–11	La Liga	0	0	0	0	0	0	—		0	0
Villarreal	Total		0	0	2	0	2	0	—		4	0
Career total			318	0	14	0	2	0	21	0	355	0
