= 2002 Segunda División B play-offs =

Spanish football league play-offs

The 2002 Segunda División B play-offs (Playoffs de Ascenso or Promoción de Ascenso) were the final playoffs for promotion from 2001–02 Segunda División B to the 2002–03 Segunda División. The four first placed teams in each of the four Segunda División B groups played the Playoffs de Ascenso and the four last placed teams in Segunda División were relegated to Segunda División B.

The teams play a league of four teams, divided into 4 groups. The champion of each group is promoted to Segunda División.

== Group A ==
=== League table ===
Pos	Team	Pld	W	D	L	GF	GA	GD	Pts	Promotion or relegation
1	Terrassa (P)	6	6	0	0	12	2	+10	18	Promotion to Segunda División
2	Barakaldo CF	6	2	1	3	3	5	−2	7	
3	Hércules	6	1	2	3	4	5	−1	5	
4	AD Ceuta	6	1	1	4	2	9	−7	4	

Source: arquero-arba
Rules for classification: 1st points; 2nd head-to-head points; 3rd head-to-head goal difference; 4th head-to-head goals scored; 5th goal difference; 6th number of goals scored
(P) Promoted

=== Results ===
Home \ Away	TER	BAR	HÉR	CEU
Terrassa		1–0	2–1	1–0
Barakaldo CF	1–3		1–0	1–0
Hércules	0–1	0–0		3–1
AD Ceuta	0–4	1–0	0–0	

Source: arquero-arba
Legend: Blue = home team win; Yellow = draw; Red = away team win.

== Group B ==
=== League table ===
Pos	Team	Pld	W	D	L	GF	GA	GD	Pts	Promotion or relegation
1	SD Compostela (P)	6	4	0	2	6	4	+2	12	Promotion to Segunda División
2	Valencia CF B	6	2	2	2	5	5	0	8	
3	FC Barcelona B	6	2	2	2	8	7	+1	8	
4	UD Mérida	6	1	2	3	3	6	−3	5	

Source: arquero-arba
Rules for classification: 1st points; 2nd head-to-head points; 3rd head-to-head goal difference; 4th head-to-head goals scored; 5th goal difference; 6th number of goals scored
(P) Promoted

=== Results ===
Home \ Away	COM	VAL	BAR	MER
SD Compostela		2–0	1–0	1–0
Valencia CF B	0–1		2–2	2–0
FC Barcelona B	3–1	0–1		3–2
UD Mérida	1–0	0–0	0–0	

Source: arquero-arba
Legend: Blue = home team win; Yellow = draw; Red = away team win.

== Group C ==
=== League table ===
Pos	Team	Pld	W	D	L	GF	GA	GD	Pts	Promotion or relegation
1	Getafe CF (P)	6	3	3	0	7	4	+3	12	Promotion to Segunda División
2	Motril CF	6	2	2	2	6	6	0	8	
3	CE L'Hospitalet	6	2	1	3	8	8	0	7	
4	Cultural Leonesa	6	2	0	4	7	10	−3	6	

Source: arquero-arba
Rules for classification: 1st points; 2nd head-to-head points; 3rd head-to-head goal difference; 4th head-to-head goals scored; 5th goal difference; 6th number of goals scored
(P) Promoted

=== Results ===
Home \ Away	GET	MOT	LHO	CLE
Getafe CF		0–0	1–1	1–0
Motril CF	1–1		1–0	0–1
CE L'Hospitalet	1–2	3–0		3–1
Cultural Leonesa	1–2	1–4	3–0	

Source: arquero-arba
Legend: Blue = home team win; Yellow = draw; Red = away team win.

== Group D ==
=== League table ===
Pos	Team	Pld	W	D	L	GF	GA	GD	Pts	Promotion or relegation
1	UD Almería (P)	6	5	0	1	11	5	+6	15	Promotion to Segunda División
2	Real Madrid B	6	4	1	1	15	7	+8	13	
3	Pontevedra	6	2	1	3	6	10	−4	7	
4	RCD Espanyol B	6	0	0	6	2	12	−10	0	

Source: arquero-arba
Rules for classification: 1st points; 2nd head-to-head points; 3rd head-to-head goal difference; 4th head-to-head goals scored; 5th goal difference; 6th number of goals scored
(P) Promoted

=== Results ===
Home \ Away	ALM	RMA	PON	ESP
UD Almería		4–1	1–0	1–0
Real Madrid B	3–1		5–0	2–1
Pontevedra	1–2	1–1		3–1
RCD Espanyol B	0–2	0–3	0–1	

Source: arquero-arba
Legend: Blue = home team win; Yellow = draw; Red = away team win.
