= CD Corralejo =

Spanish football club

Corralejo
- Full name: Club Deportivo Corralejo
- Founded: 1 June 2005
- Dissolved: 2023
- Ground: Vicente Carreño Alonso, Corralejo, Canary Islands, Spain
- Capacity: 2,000
- 2022–23: Primera Aficionados Fuerteventura, 4th of 8
Home colours	Away colours

Club Deportivo Corralejo was a Spanish football club based in Corralejo, Fuerteventura, in the autonomous community of the Canary Islands. Founded on 1 June 2005 and dissolved in 2023, it last played in Primera Aficionados Fuerteventura, holding home matches at Estadio Vicente Carreño Alonso, which holds 2,000 spectators.

== History ==
The club was founded in 2005 as Unión Deportiva Corralejo Baku in the aftermath of the merger between Club Deportivo Fuerteventura and Club Deportivo Corralejo, which formed Unión Deportiva Fuerteventura. If first reached Tercera División in 2009–10, finishing the regular season in first position but falling short in the promotion playoffs.

The first team had to withdraw for the 2013–14 Tercera División, due to lack of funding, but the club remained active by playing only youth tournaments. They played for one season (2017–18) in the Primera Regional de Aficionados before permanently returning with first team activities in 2019.

== Season to season ==
Season	Tier	Division	Place	Copa del Rey
2005–06	6	1ª Reg.	7th	
2006–07	6	1ª Reg.	1st	
2007–08	6	1ª Reg.	2nd	
2008–09	5	Int. Pref.	1st	
2009–10	4	3ª	1st	
2010–11	4	3ª	7th	First round
2011–12	4	3ª	9th	
2012–13	4	3ª	10th	

Season	Tier	Division	Place	Copa del Rey
2013–2017	DNP			
2017–18	6	1ª Afic.	11th	
2018–19	DNP			
2019–20	6	1ª Afic.	3rd	
2020–21	6	1ª Afic.	1st	
2021–22	7	1ª Afic.	2nd	
2022–23	7	1ª Afic.	4th	

- 4 seasons in Tercera División
