= Estadio Vicente Carreño Alonso =

Stadium in Corralejo, Canary Islands, Spain

Vicente Carreño Alonso
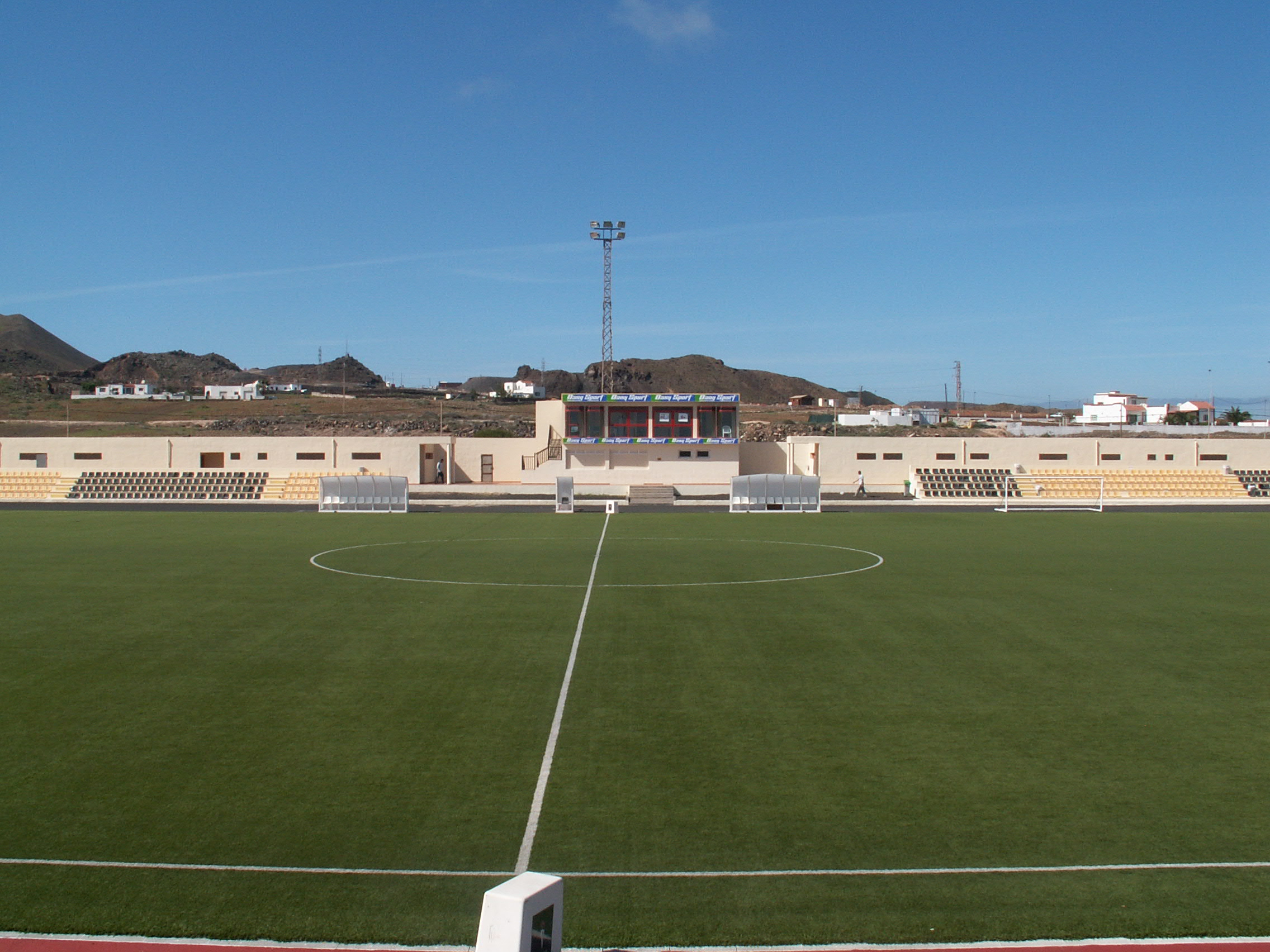
- Interactive map of Vicente Carreño Alonso
- Location: Corralejo, Fuerteventura
- Coordinates: 28.723°N 13.875°W
- Capacity: 2,000

Tenants
- CD Corralejo (1975–2004); CD Corralejo (2005–)

Estadio Vicente Carreño Alonso is a municipal stadium in Corralejo. It is home to the football club CD Corralejo.

== Gallery ==
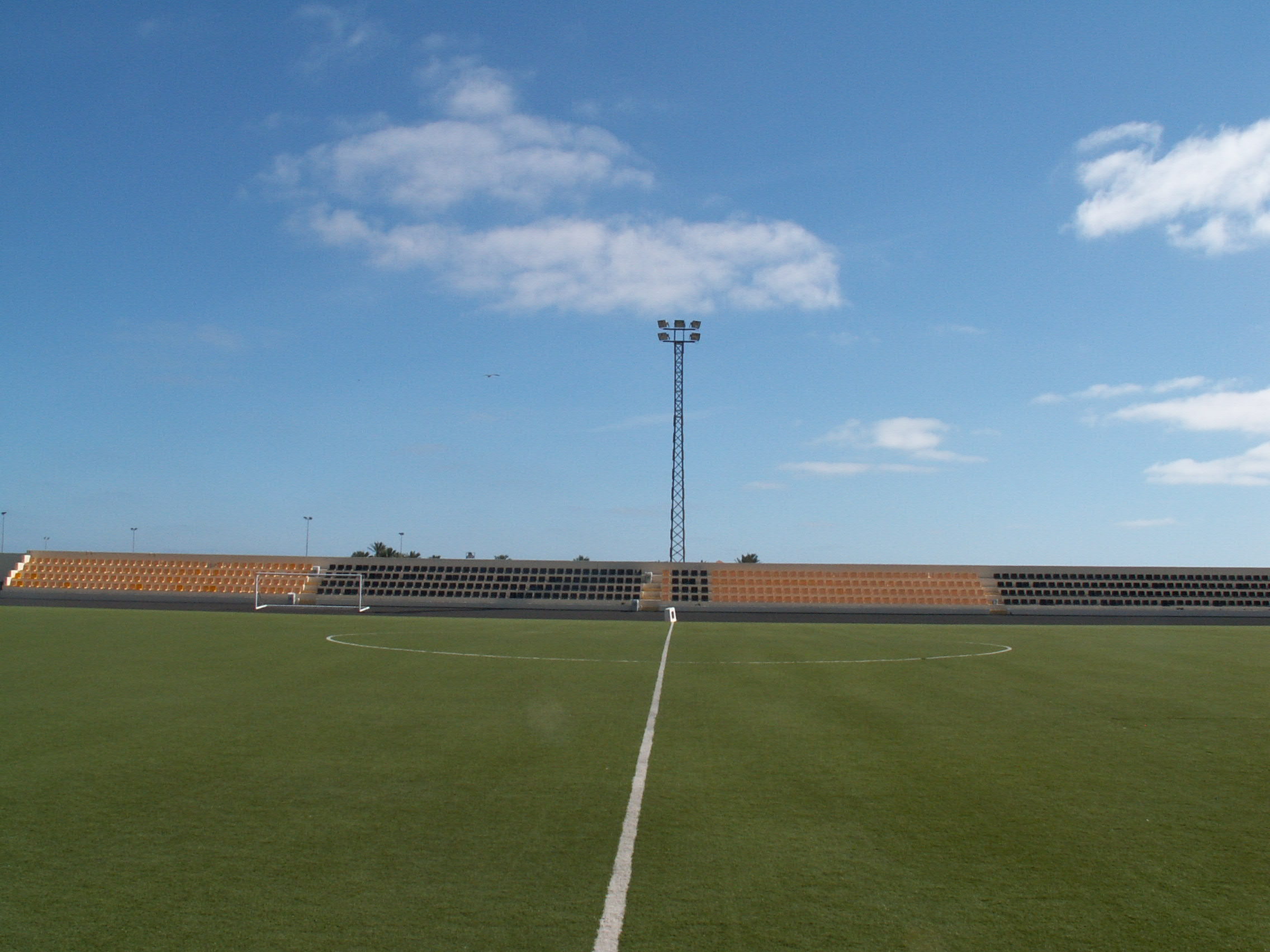
South stand

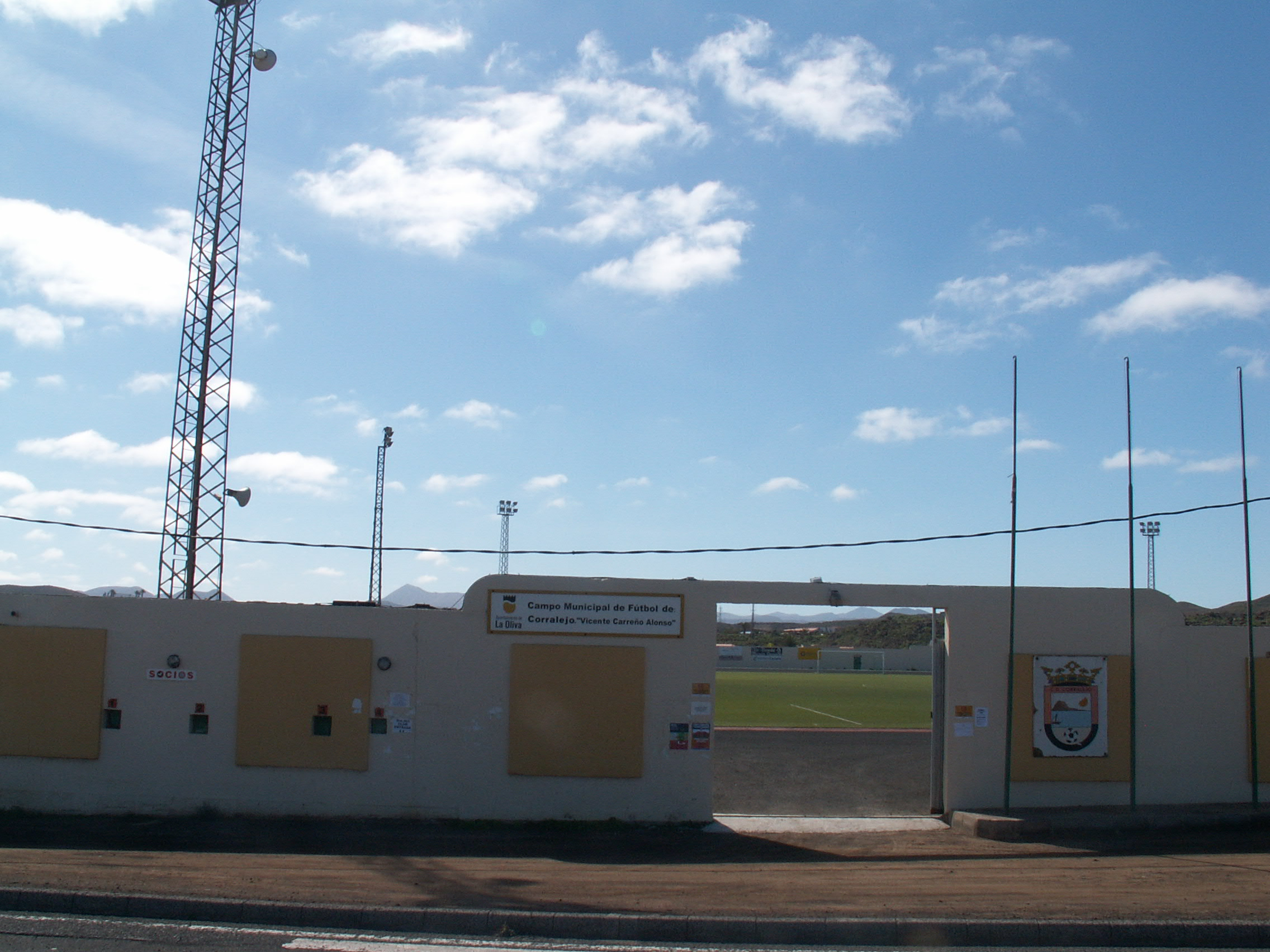
Stadium entrance

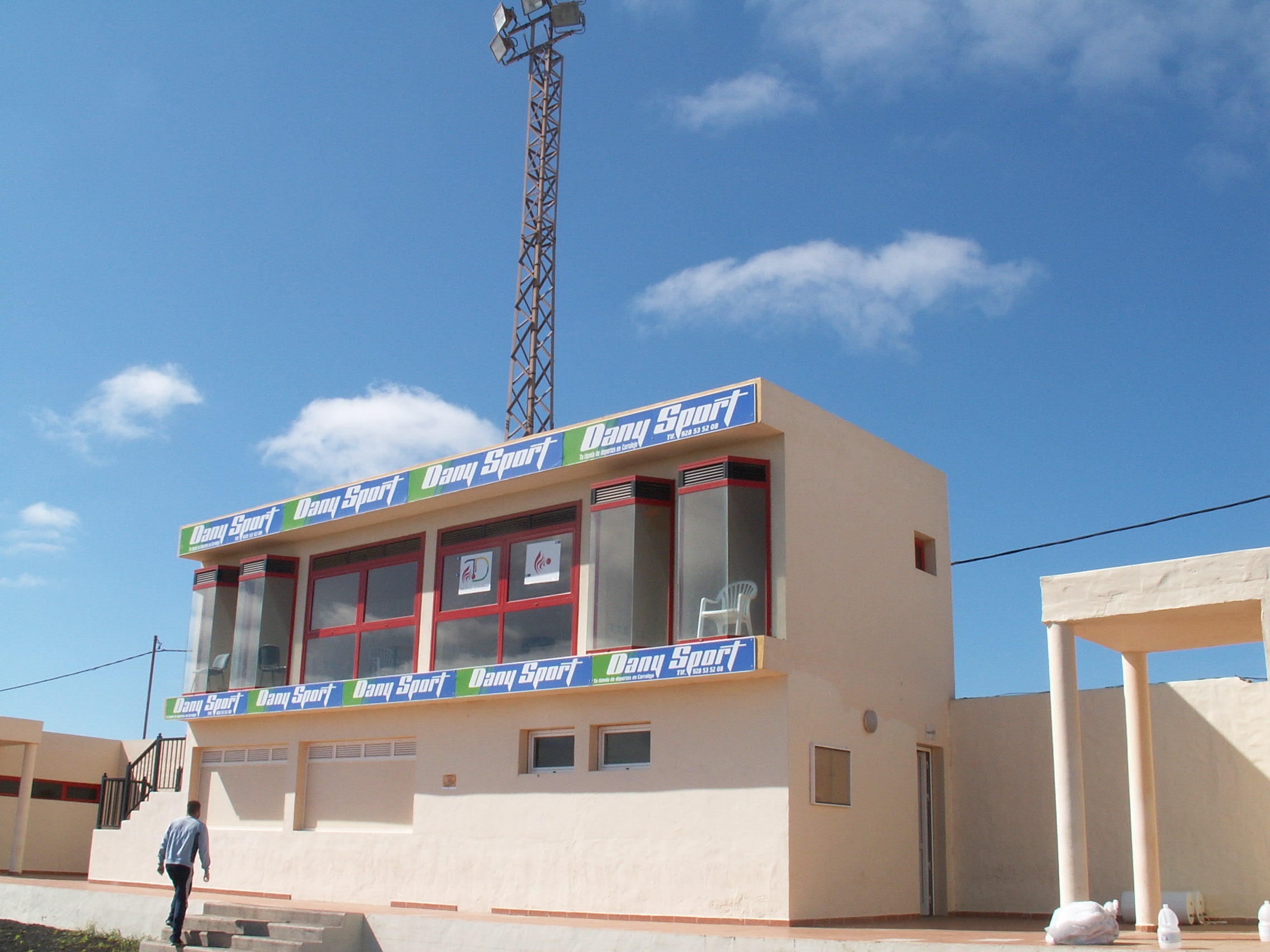
Press box
