= Mérida UD =

Spanish football club

- Full name: Mérida Unión Deportiva
- Nicknames: Romanos, Pecholatas
- Founded: 1990
- Dissolved: 19 May 2013
- Stadium: Estadio Romano
- Capacity: 14,600
- 2012–13: 3ª - Group 14, 6th
Home colours	Away colours

Mérida Unión Deportiva was a Spanish football club based in Mérida, in the autonomous community of Extremadura. Founded in 1990, they last played in Tercera División – Group 14 when dissolved in 2013, and hosted games at the Estadio Romano.

== History ==
Mérida Unión Deportiva was the predecessor of CP Mérida, which had been founded in 1912 as Sportiva Emeritense, and eventually came to play in La Liga, disappearing in 2000 due to asphyxiating debts.

Founded in 1990 as Mérida Promesas after the merge of Santa Eulalia and Los Milagros, the club was affiliated to CP Mérida until 2000, changed its name to Unión Deportiva, going on to take Club Polideportivo's place as the main team in the city. Having played mainly in the fourth division as a backup team, it did manage seven presences in the third independently, but returned to Tercera in 2009, where it played until being dissolved and replaced by new creation team Mérida AD.

=== Club background ===
- UD Mérida Promesas — (1990–2000)
- UD Mérida — (2000–05)
- Mérida UD – (2005–13)

== Season to season ==
Season	Tier	Division	Place	Copa del Rey
1990–91	5	Reg. Pref.	1st	
1991–92	4	3ª	6th	
1992–93	4	3ª	10th	
1993–94	4	3ª	3rd	
1994–95	4	3ª	9th	
1995–96	4	3ª	4th	
1996–97	4	3ª	5th	
1997–98	4	3ª	2nd	
1998–99	4	3ª	4th	
1999–2000	4	3ª	1st	
2000–01	4	3ª	2nd	
2001–02	3	2ª B	4th	

Season	Tier	Division	Place	Copa del Rey
2002–03	3	2ª B	13th	Preliminary
2003–04	3	2ª B	18th	
2004–05	4	3ª	1st	
2005–06	3	2ª B	9th	Second round
2006–07	3	2ª B	15th	
2007–08	3	2ª B	4th	
2008–09	3	2ª B	7th	Second round
2009–10	4	3ª	5th	Third round
2010–11	4	3ª	5th	
2011–12	4	3ª	8th	
2012–13	4	3ª	6th	

- 7 seasons in Segunda División B
- 15 seasons in Tercera División

== Final squad ==
Note: Flags indicate national team as defined under FIFA eligibility rules; some limited exceptions apply. Players may hold more than one non-FIFA nationality.

No.	Pos.	Nation	Player
—	GK	ESP	Isaac
—	DF	ESP	Popo
—	DF	ESP	José Mari
—	DF	ESP	Abadías
—	DF	ESP	José Ángel
—	MF	ESP	Abela
—	MF	ESP	Borja

No.	Pos.	Nation	Player
—	MF	ESP	Sancho
—	MF	ESP	Ardila
—	MF	ESP	Aguinaco
—	FW	ESP	Albertino
—	FW	ESP	Juanan
—	FW	ESP	Pedro Juan
—	FW	ESP	Álvaro

== Stadium ==
Mérida played its home games at Estadio Romano, with a capacity of 14,600 spectators.

- Google map for Estadio Romano
