= CD Corralejo (1975) =

Spanish football club

Corralejo
- Full name: Club Deportivo Corralejo
- Founded: 1975
- Dissolved: 2004
- Ground: Vicente Carreño Alonso, Corralejo, Canary Islands, Spain
- Capacity: 2,000
- 2003–04: 2ª B – Group 4, 14th of 20
| Home colours | Away colours |

Club Deportivo Corralejo was a Spanish football club based in Corralejo, Fuerteventura, in the autonomous community of the Canary Islands. Founded in 1975 and dissolved in 2004, the club played 14 seasons in Tercera División, and a further three in Segunda División B. They held home matches at Estadio Vicente Carreño Alonso, which holds 2,000 spectators.

== History ==
Founded in 1975, Corralejo first reached the Tercera División in 1987, after achieving three consecutive promotions. In 1994, the club achieved a first-ever promotion to the Segunda División B in the play-offs, but suffered immediate relegation afterwards.

Corralejo returned to the third tier in 2002, after winning their group in the Tercera. In 2004, the club merged with CD Fuerteventura to create UD Fuerteventura, and subsequently folded. A new CD Corralejo was founded in 2005.

== Season to season ==
| Season | Tier | Division | Place | Copa del Rey |
|---|---|---|---|---|
| 1980–81 | 8 | 3ª Reg. | 9th | |
| 1981–82 | 8 | 3ª Reg. | 2nd | |
| 1982–83 | 8 | 3ª Reg. | 10th | |
| 1983–84 | 7 | 2ª Reg. | 2nd | |
| 1984–85 | 7 | 2ª Reg. | 1st | |
| 1985–86 | 6 | 1ª Reg. | 1st | |
| 1986–87 | 5 | Reg. Pref. | 3rd | |
| 1987–88 | 4 | 3ª | 10th | |
| 1988–89 | 4 | 3ª | 6th | |
| 1989–90 | 4 | 3ª | 2nd | |
| 1990–91 | 4 | 3ª | 3rd | First round |
| 1991–92 | 4 | 3ª | 12th | First round |

| Season | Tier | Division | Place | Copa del Rey |
|---|---|---|---|---|
| 1992–93 | 4 | 3ª | 7th | |
| 1993–94 | 4 | 3ª | 2nd | Third round |
| 1994–95 | 3 | 2ª B | 19th | Third round |
| 1995–96 | 4 | 3ª | 1st | |
| 1996–97 | 4 | 3ª | 5th | |
| 1997–98 | 4 | 3ª | 2nd | |
| 1998–99 | 4 | 3ª | 6th | |
| 1999–2000 | 4 | 3ª | 6th | |
| 2000–01 | 4 | 3ª | 6th | |
| 2001–02 | 4 | 3ª | 1st | |
| 2002–03 | 3 | 2ª B | 15th | Second round |
| 2003–04 | 3 | 2ª B | 15th | |

- 3 seasons in Segunda División B
- 14 seasons in Tercera División
