= CD Azkoyen =

Spanish football club

Azkoyen
- Full name: Club Deportivo Azkoyen
- Founded: 1927
- Ground: Las Luchas, Peralta, Navarre, Spain
- Capacity: 2.500
- President: (Spain) Sergio Ezpeleta
- Head coach: (Spain) Diego Fernández Burgui
- League: Regional Preferente – Group 2
- 2024–25: Regional Preferente – Group 2, 8th of 16
Home colours	Away colours

Club Deportivo Azkoyen, previously called Club Multideporte Peralta and Club Deportivo Azcoyen, is a Spanish football team based in Peralta, in the autonomous community of Navarre. Founded in 1927, they have participated 24 seasons in Tercera División and three seasons in Segunda División B. They currently play in Regional Preferente – Group 2, holding home matches at Campo de Fútbol Las Luchas, with a capacity of 2.500 spectators.

== History ==
=== Club background ===
- Club Deportivo Azkoyen — (1927–2002)
- Club Multideporte Peralta — (2002–07)
- Club Deportivo Azkoyen — (2007–)

== Season to season ==
Season	Tier	Division	Place	Copa del Rey
1943–44	4	2ª Reg.	6th	
1944–45	5	2ª Reg.	3rd	
1945–46	5	2ª Reg.	1st	
1946–47	4	1ª Reg.	8th	
1947–48	4	1ª Reg.	2nd	
1948–49	4	1ª Reg.	7th	
1949–50	4	1ª Reg.	2nd	
1950–51	4	1ª Reg.	2nd	
1951–52	4	1ª Reg.	1st	
1952–53	3	3ª	14th	
1953–54	3	3ª	14th	
1954–55	3	3ª	10th	
1955–56	3	3ª	9th	
1956–57	3	3ª	2nd	
1957–58	3	3ª	7th	
1958–59	3	3ª	9th	
1959–60	3	3ª	16th	
1960–61	4	1ª Reg.	1st	
1961–62	3	3ª	13th	
1962–63	3	3ª	13th	

Season	Tier	Division	Place	Copa del Rey
1963–64	3	3ª	13th	
1964–65	3	3ª	16th	
1965–66	4	1ª Reg.	10th	
1966–67	4	1ª Reg.	8th	
1967–68	4	1ª Reg.	9th	
1968–69	4	1ª Reg.	11th	
1969–70	4	1ª Reg.	11th	
1970–71	4	1ª Reg.	18th	
1971–72	5	2ª Reg.	1st	
1972–73	4	1ª Reg.	19th	
1973–74	5	2ª Reg.	3rd	
1974–75	5	1ª Reg.	2nd	
1975–76	4	Reg. Pref.	20th	
1976–77	5	1ª Reg.	4th	
1977–78	6	1ª Reg.	12th	
1978–79	6	1ª Reg.	10th	
1979–80	6	1ª Reg.	3rd	
1980–81	5	Reg. Pref.	10th	
1981–82	5	Reg. Pref.	7th	
1982–83	5	Reg. Pref.	16th	

Season	Tier	Division	Place	Copa del Rey
1983–84	5	Reg. Pref.	9th	
1984–85	5	Reg. Pref.	18th	
1985–86	6	1ª Reg.	3rd	
1986–87	5	Reg. Pref.	4th	
1987–88	5	Reg. Pref.	3rd	
1988–89	5	Reg. Pref.	14th	
1989–90	5	Reg. Pref.	9th	
1990–91	5	Reg. Pref.	2nd	
1991–92	4	3ª	7th	
1992–93	4	3ª	19th	
1993–94	5	Reg. Pref.	16th	
1994–95	5	Reg. Pref.	1st	
1995–96	4	3ª	8th	
1996–97	4	3ª	9th	
1997–98	4	3ª	4th	
1998–99	4	3ª	2nd	
1999–2000	4	3ª	9th	
2000–01	4	3ª	7th	
2001–02	4	3ª	1st	
2002–03	3	2ª B	19th	First round

Season	Tier	Division	Place	Copa del Rey
2003–04	4	3ª	1st	
2004–05	3	2ª B	14th	First round
2005–06	3	2ª B	20th	
2006–07	4	3ª	18th	
2007–08	5	Reg. Pref.	12th	
2008–09	5	Reg. Pref.	10th	
2009–10	5	Reg. Pref.	2nd	
2010–11	5	Reg. Pref.	1st	
2011–12	4	3ª	19th	
2012–13	5	Reg. Pref.	2nd	
2013–14	5	Reg. Pref.	5th	
2014–15	5	Reg. Pref.	6th	
2015–16	5	1ª Aut.	9th	
2016–17	5	1ª Aut.	16th	
2017–18	6	Reg. Pref.	1st	
2018–19	5	1ª Aut.	15th	
2019–20	6	Reg. Pref.	1st	
2020–21	5	1ª Aut.	1st	
2021–22	5	3ª RFEF	10th	
2022–23	5	3ª Fed.	16th	

Season	Tier	Division	Place	Copa del Rey
2023–24	6	1ª Aut.	17th	
2024–25	7	Reg. Pref.	8th	
2025–26	7	Reg. Pref.		

- 3 seasons in Segunda División B
- 24 seasons in Tercera División
- 2 seasons in Tercera Federación/Tercera División RFEF

== Famous players ==
- (Argentina) Leonardo Iglesias
- (Spain) Aitor Goñi
- (Spain) Pedro Gurpegi
- (Spain) Rafa Jordà
- (Spain) Javier Lezaun
- (Spain) Nagore
- (Spain) Alejandro Nicolay
