= Nacho Franco =

Spanish footballer (born 1981)

Personal information
- Full name: José Ignacio Franco Zumeta
- Date of birth: 1 August 1981 (age 45)
- Place of birth: Pina de Ebro, Spain
- Height: 1.85 m (6 ft 1 in)
- Position: Forward

Youth career
- 1998–2000: Zaragoza

Senior career*
Years	Team	Apps	(Gls)
2000–2001	Huesca		
2001–2002	Zaragoza B	20	(4)
2002–2003	Lanzarote	41	(18)
2003–2005	Celta B	60	(23)
2003–2004	Celta	4	(0)
2005–2006	Universidad LP	36	(8)
2006	Lleida	10	(0)
2007–2008	Logroñés	45	(5)
2008–2009	Coruxo		
2009	Sporting Celanova		
2010–2012	Rápido Bouzas	?	(15)
2013	Pontellas		
- * Club domestic league appearances and goals

José Ignacio 'Nacho' Franco Zumeta (born 1 August 1981) is a Spanish retired footballer who played as a forward.

== Football career ==
Franco was born in Pina de Ebro, Province of Zaragoza. He spent the vast majority of his career playing in the third and fourth divisions of Spanish football, representing more than ten clubs.

Franco had his first and only La Liga experience in the 2003–04 season, which consisted of two matches (13 minutes) for Celta de Vigo in a relegation-ending campaign. During his two-year spell with the Galicians – which brought him a further two appearances in the second level – he was mostly registered with their reserves.
