= Corralejo =

Coordinates: 28.731539°N 13.86878°W

- Town
- Interactive map of Corralejo
- Country: Spain
- Autonomous community: Canary Islands
- Province: Las Palmas
- Island: Fuerteventura
- Municipality: La Oliva
- Time zone: UTC0 (WET)
  - Summer (DST): UTC+1 (WEST)

Corralejo (pronounced [koraˈlexo]) is a town and resort located on the northern tip of Fuerteventura, one of the Canary Islands, facing the smaller islet of Lobos. It is in the municipality of La Oliva.

It is surrounded to the north and east by the Atlantic Ocean, by dunes to the south and by arid desert land to the west that leads to the western coast and El Cotillo. Once a traditional fishing village, the town has grown significantly and today is one of the two main tourist towns on the island of Fuerteventura. Thanks to the large expat population, the town has a diverse population that varies from the local Spaniard, to the Italian, Irish, British, German and Finnish people who have settled in the resort.

The area has 7 miles (11 km) of fine sand starting 2 miles (3.2 km) outside of Corralejo, alongside some smaller bays across the coast. In addition, there are several miles of sand dunes located nearby, which have been designated as a nature reserve. The waters around Corralejo are clear and an intense shade of blue, but are affected by strong currents. The town's beaches are somewhat more sheltered and have a band of volcanic rock along the shoreline.

== History ==
=== Conquest Era ===
The area that currently contains the tourist resort and surrounding dunes was where Gadifer de la Salle and his expedition first landed on Fuerteventura in 1402. They had landed on neighbouring Lanzarote in the Summer of 1402, where they concluded a peace agreement with the local population and established a fortress from which they would coordinate their conquest of Fuerteventura. Jean de Béthencourt, who led the expedition to the islands, took a group of his men across the water from their fortress in Lanzarote to explore Fuerteventura.

On that first landing, Béthencourt remained on board the ship while La Salle and Remonnet de Levedan went ashore to explore the island and look for locals. The arid North of the island was not densely populated and the conquistadors found little in the way of local life.

While La Salle was on Fuerteventura (he and his party stayed for eight days on their first landing), a mutiny had broken out on the ship where Béthencourt and his men remained. The mutiny was carried out by men who demanded Béthencourt return to mainland Europe to get supplies. While Béthencourt was away, La Salle made his second landing on Fuerteventura, again using the area around Corralejo as their landing site.

They made the crossing from the Lanzarote fortress in October 1402, landing on the Island of Lobos to hunt the local seal population that lived there. Lobos is positioned 2 kilometres (1.2 miles) north east of Corralejo and made a convenient base to hunt (with the island's seals being valuable for food, while their skins were used to make simple shoes). After a few days on the island, La Salle sent Levedan back to the fortress on Lanzarote to replenish their supplies, with the group in particular need of water- Lobos has no fresh water source. Another mutiny on Lanzarote meant that, on its arrival, the boat Levedan was in command of was taken over by the mutineer members of Béthencourt's army of conquest. This left La Salle and his men trapped on the island of Lobos without a source of food or water.

Those who remained loyal to Béthencourt on Lanzarote would use a flimsy boat to rescue La Salle and his men from Lobos.

=== Beginning of the town. 1800s-1920s ===
According to oral tradition, the town of Corralejo was founded around 1810. However, others say that there was no proper settlement until the 1850s. What can be said for sure is that Corralejo's first inhabitants built their homes with nearby stone and easily accessible materials. The town's name could possibly go back to the previous use of the area for coastal cattle. Corralejo would remain a small fishing cove until the mid-20th century, being dependent on La Oliva and on imports from abroad.

The wind was key in the lives of everyday people. For the average Corralejo fisherman, the lack of wind while sailing would have meant an increase in the effort made on a day-to-day basis to get that daily wage to take home, since the fishing areas or zones of the north coast of Fuerteventura are quite far from the harbour and, although there are some closer to the Corralejo area, they weren't very profitable for fishermen. On the other hand, the lack of wind left the windmills completely still, at a time when the island's basic food was gofio. With no wind to help make gofio, the townspeople would have had to wait for days. Queues would form until the wind came in again and the millers began their work.

The first settlers of Corralejo arrived from the neighbouring island of Lanzarote, from Galicia or even from Portugal, with names such as Carballo, Estévez, Hierro, de León, Umpiérrez or Figueroa being the oldest and most common surnames in the town's history. Until the 1950s, there were only about 11 surnames in the whole town (which back then had a population of little more than 100), with many of these family names intermingling.

According to correspondence bearing the letterhead of Clarence House, a much smaller and sparsely populated Corralejo received a surprise visitor in December of 1910, that being Prince Arthur, Duke of Connaught, who seemed to have briefly stopped over after visiting La Orotava in Tenerife. According to the letter, the duke greatly enjoyed his stay, stating "If I could make this my home, I would gladly do so".

The old town chapel of Our Lady of Mount Carmel was built in 1925 by the townspeople together, with each fisherman placing his piece (it is no longer standing, as it was replaced by a more modern church in the 1980s).

=== Tourism ===
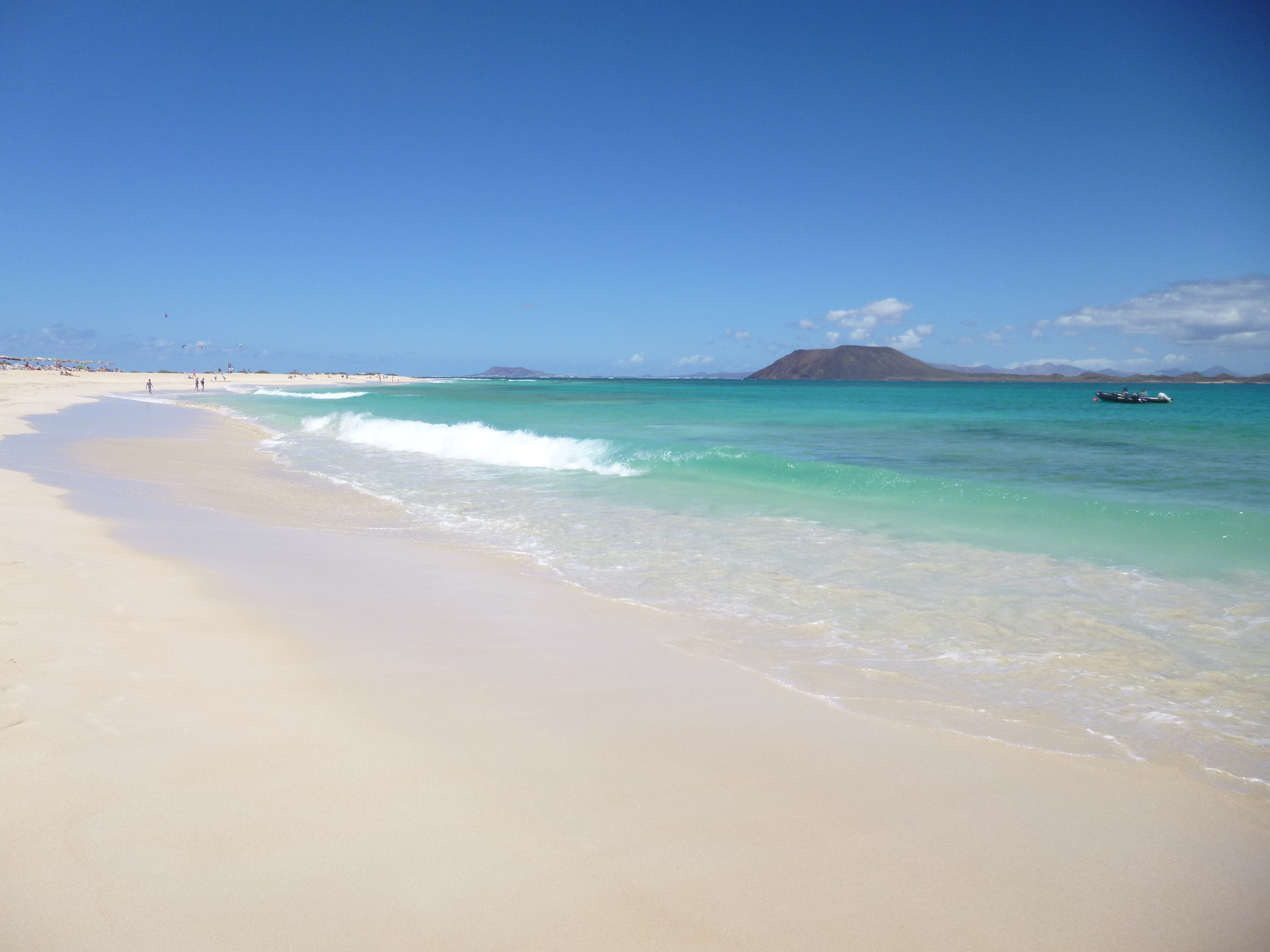
The Dunes of Corralejo are a major tourist attraction.

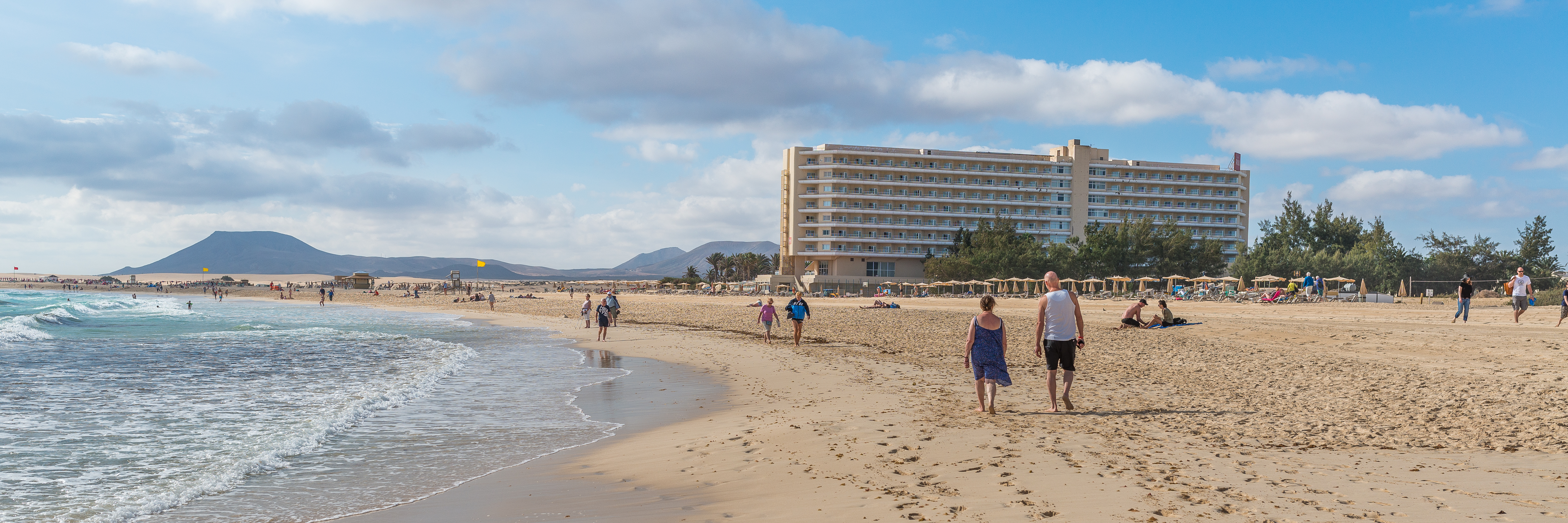
Corralejo 2016

Corralejo has existed for most of its history as a humble and unimportant fishing village, where a handful of poor fishermen worked long hours to provide for their families. In the early 1970s, with its extraordinary beaches and expansive dunes, the tourism that had arrived in the south of the island in the 1960s began to venture north. Corralejo had very humble beginnings as a tourist resort. John Mercer, who visited the then village in the early 1970s as research for a book on the island, left a record of the humble first steps Corralejo took into the tourist industry:

"The village, however, unattractive and quite without interest. Why anyone should wish to spend any time there until its development is over and the dust and noise have died down is not clear.. a visitor or a purchaser can wake up any day to find a house or a hotel starting a metre or two away." -John Mercer, Canary Islands: Fuerteventura. 1973

Mercer prophetically said that Corralejo would "long be simply a spreading building site, dominated by concrete mixers, lorries, floating discarded cement bags, falling rubble and staring whistling oafs." Tourism continued to develop in the town through the 1970s, 1980s and 1990s, reaching a peak in the 2000s. Hotels, apartments and villas sprang up. Many British and Irish tourists fell in love with the resort and felt happy to relocate there permanently. In the decades following Mercer's account of Corralejo's tourist development, that same growth of the tourist industry saw the population of Corralejo and the La Oliva region grow significantly. In the 1975 census the population of La Oliva was 2,900, with that population now over 28,000 (2022).

Throughout the 2010s, the town has grown significantly, with new businesses constantly opening and closing down. The town is also progressively being pedestrianized, starting with the town's main street around 2017 (however this decision to pedestrianize streets has received its share of criticism from the townsfolk). Vandalism has also risen with the long-abandoned replica of the Santa Maria galleon in the old "Europa Baku" theme park having been burned down by vandals in May 2019. Despite this, however, tourism is still going strong, with thousands visiting the town every year.

== Transport ==
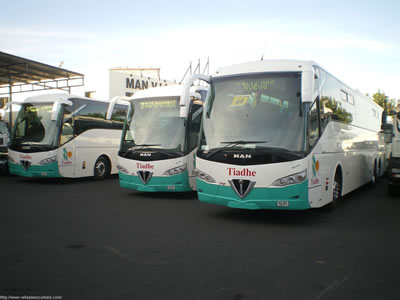
Tiadhe bus service. The main bus service of Fuerteventura

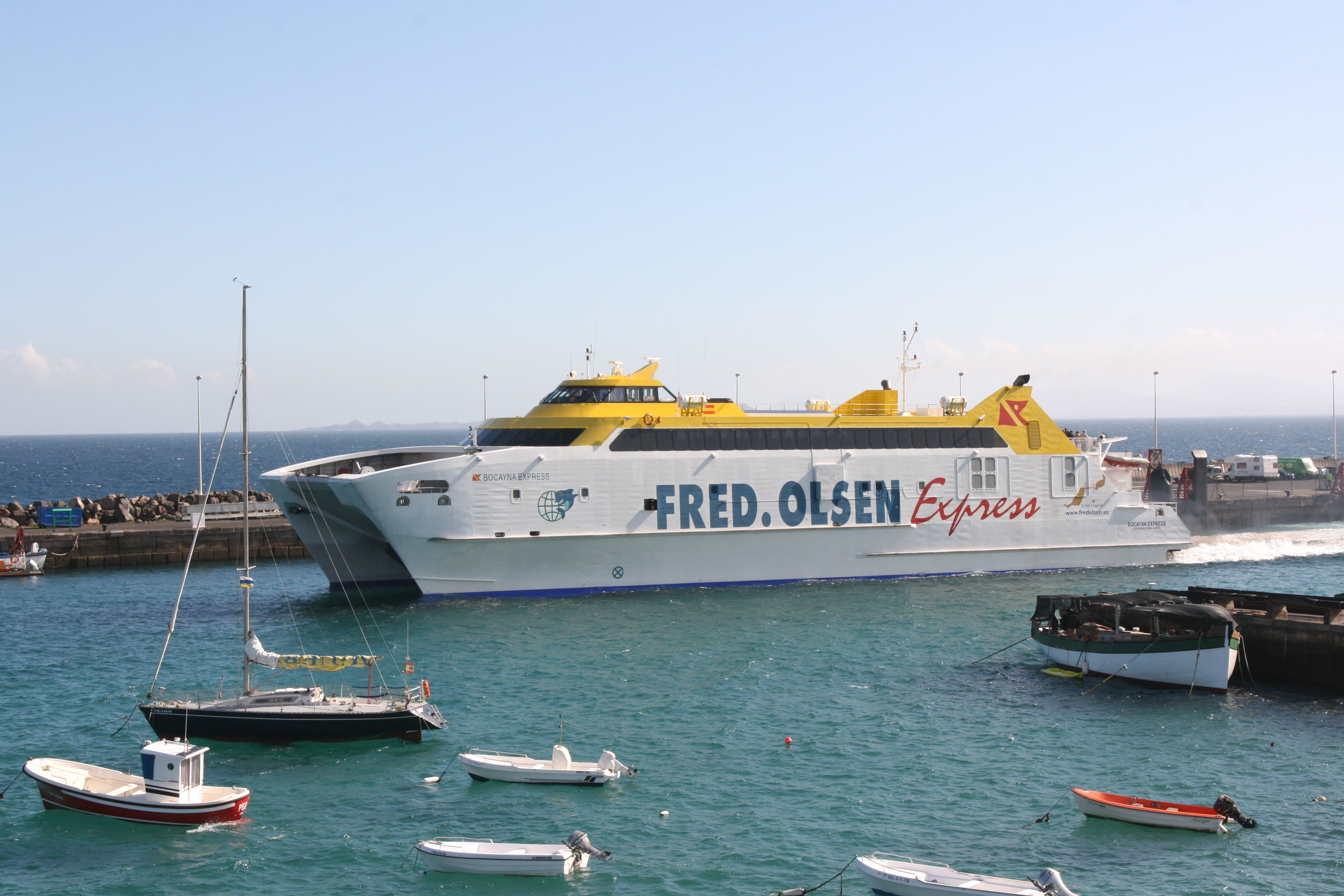
Fred Olsen Express, as well as Naviera Armas, offers ferry connections between Corralejo and Playa Blanca in Lanzarote

Corralejo is serviced by a bus service (both public and chartered) and by a local taxi service operated by the region of La Oliva. The public bus service (Tiadhe) operates a bus service from the island's capital Puerto del Rosario (number 6), and from Puerto del Rosario to Caleta de Fuste and the Fuerteventura Airport (number 3) and down to the south of the island and the resort town of Morro Jable (number 1). Corralejo is serviced by taxis that offer local transport around the town and out to the beaches, and also travel further afield to the airport and other points and towns of interest. Ferries regularly connect the port of Corralejo with Playa Blanca in the south of Lanzarote.

== Sports ==
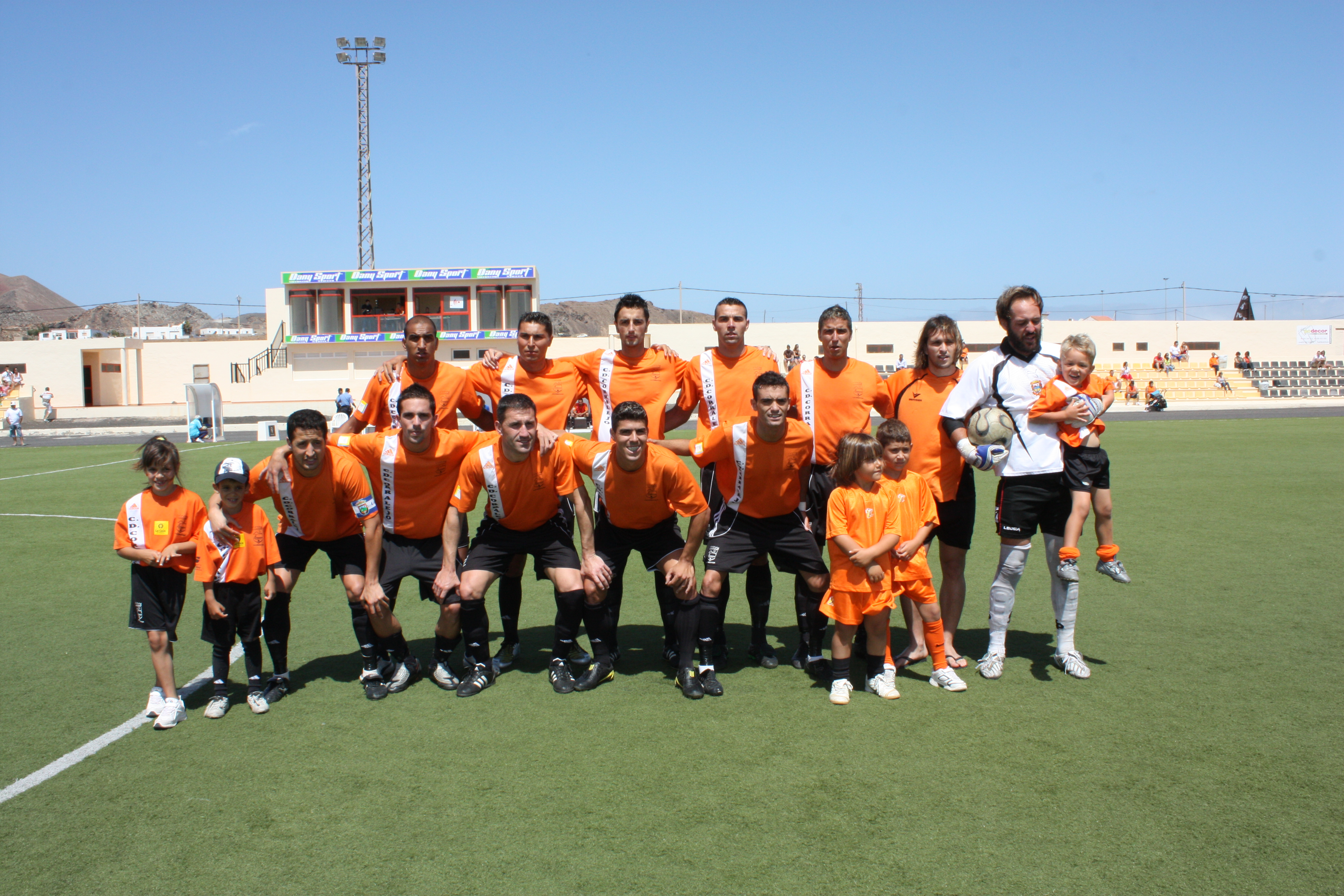
C.D. Corralejo

Corralejo is the home of the CD Corralejo football team (founded in 2005 after the merger of another club with the same name in the previous year), and is also home to the Onexe Fuerteventura SUP team, the standup paddleboarding club with the most titles in Spain.
