= 1997 Tercera División play-offs =

Spanish football league play-offs

The 1997 Tercera División play-offs to Segunda División B from Tercera División (Promotion play-offs) were the final playoffs for the promotion from 1996–97 Tercera División to 1998–99 Segunda División B. The first four teams in each group (excluding reserve teams) took part in the play-off.

== Format ==
The 68 participating teams were divided into 5 series each made up of 4 groups in the category, with the exception of Series E , which was only formed by Group XII . Each series was divided into 4 groups formed by a 1st, a 2nd, a 3rd and a 4th classified from each group, which played a double-round playoff. Each victory was equivalent to 3 points, the tie to 1 point and the defeat to 0 points. The champion of each group obtained the promotion to Second Division B.

The distribution of each series was as follows:

Series A:

- Group I – Galicia (Galicia (Spain))
- Group II – Asturias
- Group VII – Community of Madrid
- Group VIII – Castile and León

Series B:

- Group III – Cantabria
- Group IV – Basque Country (Basque Country (autonomous community))
- Group XV – La Rioja and Navarre
- Group XVI – Aragon

Series C:

- Group V – Catalonia
- Group VI – Valencian Community
- Group XI – Balearic Islands
- Gruoup XIII – Region of Murcia

Series D:

- Group IX – Eastern Andalusia and Melilla
- Group X – Western Andalusia and Ceuta
- Group XIV – Extremadura
- Group XVII – Castilla–La Mancha

Series E:

- Group XII – Canary Islands

== Teams for 1996–97 play-offs ==
Group I – Galicia (Galicia (Spain))	Group II – Asturias	Group III – Cantabria	Group IV – Basque Country (Basque Country (autonomous community))	Group V – Catalonia
1st Vista Alegre SD	1st Club Siero	1st CD Tropezón	1st CD Touring	1st Palamós CF
2nd Puente Orense CF	2nd Navia CF	2nd Racing de Santander B	2nd CD Elgoibar	2nd FC Barcelona C
3rd CD Lalín	3rd Caudal Deportivo	3rd CD Bezana	3rd Deportivo Alavés B	3rd UE Badaloní
4th Viveiro CF	4th CD Lealtad	4th Velarde CF	4th Amurrio Club	4th CE Europa

Group VI – Valencian Community	Group VII – Community of Madrid	Group VIII – Castile and León	Group IX – E. Andalusia and Melilla	Group X – W. Andalusia and Ceuta
1st CD Alcoyano	1st CF Rayo Majadahonda	1st Burgos CF	1st Motril CF	1st Club Atlético Ceutí
2nd Ontinyent CF	2nd DAV Santa Ana	2nd CF Palencia Cristo Olímpico	2nd UD Maracena	2nd Isla Cristina CD
3rd Novelda CF	3rd RSD Alcalá	3rd CF Salmantino	3rd CD Linares	3rd Algeciras CF
4th CD Olímpic de Xàtiva	4th CD Leganés B	4th Zamora CF	4th Úbeda CF	4th Ayamonte CF

Group XI – Balearic Islands	Group XII – Canary Islands	Group XIII – Region of Murcia	Group XIV – Extremadura	Group XV – Navarre and La Rioja
1st CD Constancia	1st SD Tenisca	1st Cartagonova CF	1st Jerez CF	1st Peña Sport FC
2nd CD Atlético Baleares	2nd CD Tenerife B	2nd Lorca CF	2nd Moralo CP	2nd UDC Chantrea
3rd CF Sóller	3rd CD Maspalomas	3rd Jumilla CF	3rd UP Plasencia	3rd CD Oberena
4th CD Manacor	4th UD Pájara Playas de Jandía	4th Águilas CF	4th CD Grabasa Burguillos	4th Haro Deportivo

Group XVI – Aragon	Group XVII – Castilla–La Mancha
1st CD Binéfar	1st Tomelloso CF
2nd UD Barbastro	2nd CD Torrijos
3rd CD Endesa Andorra	3rd CP Villarrobledo
4th UD Fraga	4th UB Conquense

== Tables and Results ==
=== Group A-1 ===
Pos	Team	Pld	W	D	L	GF	GA	GD	Pts	Qualification or relegation
1	(Castile and León) Burgos CF (substituted on)	6	4	2	0	10	2	+8	14	Promoted to Segunda División B
2	(Galicia (Spain)) Puente Orense CF	6	2	2	2	4	5	−1	8	
3	(Community of Madrid) RSD Alcalá	6	2	1	3	5	5	0	7	
4	(Asturias) CD Lealtad	6	1	1	4	3	10	−7	4	

Source: Fútbol Regional

Home \ Away	ALC	BUR	LEA	POR
RSD Alcalá	—	0–0	1–0	2–1
Burgos CF	2–1	—	5–0	2–1
CD Lealtad	2–1	0–1	—	1–1
Puente Orense CF	1–0	0–0	1–0	—

Updated to match(es) played on completed. Source: FutbolMe
Legend: Blue = home team win; Yellow = draw; Red = away team win.

=== Group A-2 ===
Pos	Team	Pld	W	D	L	GF	GA	GD	Pts	Qualification or relegation
1	(Community of Madrid) CD Leganés B (substituted on)	6	5	0	1	11	7	+4	15	Promoted to Segunda División B
2	(Galicia (Spain)) Vista Alegre SD	6	4	1	1	12	4	+8	13	
3	(Castile and León) CF Salmantino	6	0	3	3	5	8	−3	3	
4	(Asturias) Navia CF	6	0	2	4	4	13	−9	2	

Source: Fútbol Regional

Home \ Away	LEG	NAV	SAL	VIA
CD Leganés B	—	3–0	1–0	0–4
Navia CF	1–2	—	0–0	1–2
CF Salmantino	2–3	2–2	—	1–1
Vista Alegre SD	0–2	4–0	1–0	—

Updated to match(es) played on completed. Source: FutbolMe
Legend: Blue = home team win; Yellow = draw; Red = away team win.

=== Group A-3 ===
Pos	Team	Pld	W	D	L	GF	GA	GD	Pts	Qualification or relegation
1	(Castile and León) Zamora CF (substituted on)	6	4	2	0	13	5	+8	14	Promoted to Segunda División B
2	(Galicia (Spain)) CD Lalín	6	3	1	2	8	9	−1	10	
3	(Community of Madrid) DAV Santa Ana	6	1	2	3	5	7	−2	5	
4	(Asturias) Club Siero	6	0	3	3	7	12	−5	3	

Source: Fútbol Regional

Home \ Away	DSA	LAL	SIE	ZAM
DAV Santa Ana	—	3–1	1–1	0–1
CD Lalín	1–0	—	1–0	1–0
Club Siero	1–1	2–3	—	2–2
Zamora CF	2–0	4–2	4–1	—

Updated to match(es) played on completed. Source: FutbolMe
Legend: Blue = home team win; Yellow = draw; Red = away team win.

=== Group A-4 ===
Pos	Team	Pld	W	D	L	GF	GA	GD	Pts	Qualification or relegation
1	(Asturias) Caudal Deportivo (substituted on)	6	4	0	2	13	4	+9	12	Promoted to Segunda División B
2	(Castile and León) CF Palencia Cristo Olímpico	6	3	2	1	7	3	+4	11	
3	(Community of Madrid) CF Rayo Majadahonda	6	2	1	3	9	14	−5	7	
4	(Galicia (Spain)) Viveiro CF	6	1	1	4	4	12	−8	4	

Source: Fútbol Regional

Home \ Away	CAU	PAL	RMJ	VIV
Caudal Deportivo	—	2–0	6–0	3–0
CF Palencia Cristo Olímpico	1–0	—	0–0	2–0
CF Rayo Majadahonda	1–2	1–4	—	3–1
Viveiro CF	2–0	0–0	1–4	—

Updated to match(es) played on completed. Source: FutbolMe
Legend: Blue = home team win; Yellow = draw; Red = away team win.

=== Group B-1 ===
Pos	Team	Pld	W	D	L	GF	GA	GD	Pts	Qualification or relegation
1	(Basque Country (autonomous community)) Amurrio Club (substituted on)	6	4	2	0	15	5	+10	14	Promoted to Segunda División B
2	(Navarre) Peña Sport FC	6	4	2	0	14	5	+9	14	
3	(Cantabria) CD Bezana	6	1	0	5	4	14	−10	3	
4	(Aragon) UD Barbastro	6	1	0	5	2	11	−9	3	

Source: Fútbol Regional

Home \ Away	AMU	BAB	BEZ	PÑS
Amurrio Club	—	1–0	4–0	1–1
UD Barbastro	1–2	—	1–0	0–2
CD Bezana	0–4	3–0	—	1–4
Peña Sport FC	3–3	3–0	1–0	—

Updated to match(es) played on completed. Source: FutbolMe
Legend: Blue = home team win; Yellow = draw; Red = away team win.

=== Group B-2 ===
Pos	Team	Pld	W	D	L	GF	GA	GD	Pts	Qualification or relegation
1	(Basque Country (autonomous community)) CD Elgoibar (substituted on)	6	5	1	0	14	1	+13	16	Promoted to Segunda División B
2	(Asturias) UD Fraga	6	3	0	3	9	15	−6	9	
3	(Cantabria) CD Tropezón	6	2	1	3	7	7	0	7	
4	(Navarre) CD Oberena	6	0	2	4	4	11	−7	2	

Source: Fútbol Regional

Home \ Away	ELG	FRA	OBE	TRO
CD Elgoibar	—	5–0	3–0	3–0
UD Fraga	1–2	—	4–2	2–1
CD Oberena	0–0	1–2	—	0–0
CD Tropezón	0–1	1–2	2–1	—

Updated to match(es) played on completed. Source: FutbolMe
Legend: Blue = home team win; Yellow = draw; Red = away team win.

=== Group B-3 ===
Pos	Team	Pld	W	D	L	GF	GA	GD	Pts	Qualification or relegation
1	(Cantabria) Racing de Santander B (substituted on)	6	3	2	1	8	4	+4	11	Promoted to Segunda División B
2	(Aragon) CD Binéfar	6	3	1	2	12	8	+4	10	
3	(Basque Country (autonomous community)) Deportivo Alavés B	6	2	3	1	10	9	+1	9	
4	(La Rioja) Haro Deportivo	6	0	2	4	2	11	−9	2	

Source: Fútbol Regional

Home \ Away	ALA	BIN	HAR	RAC
Deportivo Alavés B	—	1–1	3–1	0–3
CD Binéfar	3–5	—	3–0	1–2
Haro Deportivo	0–0	0–3	—	0–1
Racing de Santander B	1–1	0–1	1–1	—

Updated to match(es) played on completed. Source: FutbolMe
Legend: Blue = home team win; Yellow = draw; Red = away team win.

=== Group B-4 ===
Pos	Team	Pld	W	D	L	GF	GA	GD	Pts	Qualification or relegation
1	(Aragon) CD Endesa Andorra (substituted on)	6	4	0	2	7	6	+1	12	Promoted to Segunda División B
2	(Basque Country (autonomous community)) CD Touring	6	3	2	1	11	7	+4	11	
3	(Navarre) UDC Chantrea	6	1	3	2	7	8	−1	6	
4	(Cantabria) Velarde CF	6	0	3	3	7	11	−4	3	

Source: Fútbol Regional

Home \ Away	CHA	EAN	TOU	VEL
UDC Chantrea	—	0–1	2–2	1–1
CD Endesa Andorra	1–2	—	2–0	2–1
CD Touring	1–0	3–0	—	3–1
Velarde CF	2–2	0–1	2–2	—

Updated to match(es) played on completed. Source: FutbolMe
Legend: Blue = home team win; Yellow = draw; Red = away team win.

=== Group C-1 ===
Pos	Team	Pld	W	D	L	GF	GA	GD	Pts	Qualification or relegation
1	(Region of Murcia) Lorca CF (substituted on)	6	5	0	1	18	7	+11	15	Promoted to Segunda División B
2	(Valencian Community) CD Alcoyano	6	4	0	2	18	12	+6	12	
3	(Catalonia) UE Badaloní	6	2	1	3	9	13	−4	7	
4	(Balearic Islands) CD Manacor	6	0	1	5	4	17	−13	1	

Source: Fútbol Regional

Home \ Away	ALC	BAD	LOR	MAN
CD Alcoyano	—	5–1	3–1	1–0
UE Badaloní	3–2	—	0–2	1–1
Lorca CF	5–2	3–1	—	4–0
CD Manacor	2–5	0–3	1–3	—

Updated to match(es) played on completed. Source: FutbolMe
Legend: Blue = home team win; Yellow = draw; Red = away team win.

=== Group C-2 ===
Pos	Team	Pld	W	D	L	GF	GA	GD	Pts	Qualification or relegation
1	(Valencian Community) Novelda CF (substituted on)	6	4	1	1	6	4	+2	13	Promoted to Segunda División B
2	(Catalonia) Palamós CF	6	2	2	2	7	4	+3	8	
3	(Balearic Islands) CD Atlético Baleares	6	1	4	1	6	4	+2	7	
4	(Region of Murcia) Águilas CF	6	1	1	4	5	12	−7	4	

Source: Fútbol Regional

Home \ Away	ÁGU	BAL	NOV	PAL
Águilas CF	—	1–0	0–1	1–4
CD Atlético Baleares	2–2	—	3–0	0–0
Novelda CF	3–1	0–0	—	1–0
Palamós CF	2–0	1–1	0–1	—

Updated to match(es) played on completed. Source: FutbolMe
Legend: Blue = home team win; Yellow = draw; Red = away team win.

=== Group C-3 ===
Pos	Team	Pld	W	D	L	GF	GA	GD	Pts	Qualification or relegation
1	(Catalonia) FC Barcelona C (Note: Remained at Tercera División due to FC Barcelona B relegation from Segunda División to Segunda División B.)	6	5	0	1	16	7	+9	15	
2	(Balearic Islands) CF Sóller (substituted on) (Note: Promoted to Segunda División B instead of FC Barcelona C.)	6	2	2	2	8	9	−1	8	Promoted to Segunda División B
3	(Region of Murcia) Cartagonova CF	6	1	2	3	11	14	−3	5	
4	(Valencian Community) CD Olímpic de Xàtiva	6	1	2	3	13	18	−5	5	

Source: Fútbol Regional
Notes:

Home \ Away	BAR	CAR	OLÍ	SÓL
FC Barcelona C	—	5–2	3–2	4–0
Cartagonova CF	0–2	—	4–4	1–1
CD Olímpic de Xàtiva	3–1	1–4	—	3–3
CF Sóller	0–1	1–0	3–0	—

Updated to match(es) played on completed. Source: FutbolMe
Legend: Blue = home team win; Yellow = draw; Red = away team win.

=== Group C-4 ===
Pos	Team	Pld	W	D	L	GF	GA	GD	Pts	Qualification or relegation
1	(Valencian Community) Ontinyent CF (substituted on)	6	4	1	1	15	8	+7	13	Promoted to Segunda División B
2	(Catalonia) CE Europa	6	3	3	0	10	5	+5	12	
3	(Balearic Islands) CD Constancia	6	0	4	2	6	9	−3	4	
4	(Region of Murcia) Jumilla CF	6	0	2	4	3	12	−9	2	

Source: Fútbol Regional

Home \ Away	CON	EUR	JUM	ONT
CD Constancia	—	1–1	1–1	1–2
CE Europa	1–1	—	2–1	2–1
Jumilla CF	1–1	0–2	—	1–3
Ontinyent CF	4–2	0–0	4–0	—

Updated to match(es) played on completed. Source: FutbolMe
Legend: Blue = home team win; Yellow = draw; Red = away team win.

=== Group D-1 ===
Pos	Team	Pld	W	D	L	GF	GA	GD	Pts	Qualification or relegation
1	(Andalusia) Motril CF (substituted on)	6	5	0	1	8	2	+6	15	Promoted to Segunda División B
2	(Castilla–La Mancha) CD Torrijos	6	5	0	1	11	4	+7	15	
3	(Extremadura) CD Grabasa Burguillos	6	1	1	4	5	11	−6	4	
4	(Andalusia) Algeciras CF	6	0	1	5	3	10	−7	1	

Source: Fútbol Regional

Home \ Away	ALG	GBU	MOT	TOR
Algeciras CF	—	1–1	0–2	0–1
CD Grabasa Burguillos	3–2	—	0–1	5–1
Motril CF	1–0	1–0	—	2–0
CD Torrijos	2–0	0–1	2–1	—

Updated to match(es) played on completed. Source: FutbolMe
Legend: Blue = home team win; Yellow = draw; Red = away team win.

=== Group D-2 ===
Pos	Team	Pld	W	D	L	GF	GA	GD	Pts	Qualification or relegation
1	(Extremadura) UP Plasencia (substituted on)	6	4	1	1	8	2	+6	13	Promoted to Segunda División B
2	(Ceuta) Club Atlético Ceutí	6	4	0	2	11	4	+7	12	
3	(Andalusia) UD Maracena	6	2	0	4	4	11	−7	6	
4	(Castilla–La Mancha) UB Conquense	6	1	1	4	7	13	−6	4	

Source: Fútbol Regional

Home \ Away	ACE	COQ	MAR	PLA
Atlético Ceutí	—	6–1	2–1	1–0
UB Conquense	0–2	—	4–0	0–2
UD Maracena	1–0	2–1	—	0–1
UP Plasencia	1–0	1–1	3–0	—

Updated to match(es) played on completed. Source: FutbolMe
Legend: Blue = home team win; Yellow = draw; Red = away team win.

=== Group D-3 ===
Pos	Team	Pld	W	D	L	GF	GA	GD	Pts	Qualification or relegation
1	(Extremadura) Moralo CP (substituted on)	6	3	3	0	8	3	+5	12	Promoted to Segunda División B
2	(Castilla–La Mancha) Tomelloso CF	6	2	3	1	5	4	+1	9	
3	(Andalusia) CD Linares	6	1	3	2	6	6	0	6	
4	(Andalusia) Ayamonte CF	6	1	1	4	3	9	−6	4	

Source: Fútbol Regional

Home \ Away	AYA	LIN	MOR	TOM
Ayamonte CF	—	2–1	1–1	0–1
CD Linares	2–0	—	0–1	0–0
Moralo CP	3–0	1–1	—	1–0
Tomelloso CF	1–0	2–2	1–1	—

Updated to match(es) played on completed. Source: FutbolMe
Legend: Blue = home team win; Yellow = draw; Red = away team win.

=== Group D-4 ===
Pos	Team	Pld	W	D	L	GF	GA	GD	Pts	Qualification or relegation
1	(Andalusia) Isla Cristina CD (substituted on)	6	3	3	0	12	2	+10	12	Promoted to Segunda División B
2	(Extremadura) Jerez CF	6	3	3	0	10	4	+6	12	
3	(Andalusia) Úbeda CF	6	2	0	4	5	14	−9	6	
4	(Castilla–La Mancha) CP Villarrobledo	6	0	2	4	6	13	−7	2	

Source: Fútbol Regional

Home \ Away	ICR	JER	ÚBE	VRB
Isla Cristina CD	—	0–0	2–0	3–1
Jerez CF	0–0	—	3–0	2–2
Úbeda CF	0–6	1–2	—	3–1
CP Villarrobledo	1–1	1–3	0–1	—

Updated to match(es) played on completed. Source: FutbolMe
Legend: Blue = home team win; Yellow = draw; Red = away team win.

=== Group E ===
Pos	Team	Pld	W	D	L	GF	GA	GD	Pts	Qualification or relegation
1	(Canary Islands) UD Pájara Playas de Jandía (substituted on)	6	5	1	0	14	1	+13	16	Promoted to Segunda División B
2	(Canary Islands) SD Tenisca	6	2	1	3	4	8	−4	7	
3	(Canary Islands) CD Tenerife B	6	1	2	3	7	7	0	5	
4	(Canary Islands) CD Maspalomas	6	1	2	3	4	13	−9	5	

Source: Fútbol Regional

Home \ Away	MAS	PPJ	TNS	TFE
CD Maspalomas	—	0–5	1–0	1–1
UD Pájara Playas de Jandía	1–0	—	4–0	1–0
SD Tenisca	1–1	0–2	—	1–0
CD Tenerife B	5–1	1–1	0–2	—

Updated to match(es) played on completed. Source: FutbolMe
Legend: Blue = home team win; Yellow = draw; Red = away team win.

== Teams Promoted ==
Group I – Galicia (Galicia (Spain))

- None

Group II – Asturias

- Caudal Deportivo

Group III – Cantabria

- Racing de Santander B

Group IV – Basque Country (Basque Country (autonomous community))

- CD Elgoibar
- Amurrio Club

Group V – Catalonia

- None

Group VI – Valencian Community

- Ontinyent CF
- Novelda CF

Group VII – Community of Madrid

- CD Leganés B

Group VIII – Castile and León

- Burgos CF
- Zamora CF

Group IX – E. Andalusia and Melilla

- Motril CF

Group X – W. Andalusia and Ceuta

- Isla Cristina CD

Group XI – Balearic Islands

- CF Sóller

Group XII – Canary Islands

- UD Pájara Playas de Jandía

Group XIII – Region of Murcia

- Lorca CF

Group XIV – Extremadura

- Moralo CP
- UP Plasencia

Group XV – Navarre and La Rioja

- None

Group XVI – Aragon

- CD Endesa Andorra

Group XVII – Castilla–La Mancha

- None
