= 1997–98 Segunda División B =

Segunda División B
- Season: 1997–98
- Promoted: Barcelona B Mallorca B Málaga; Recreativo de Huelva
- Relegated: As Pontes; Rayo Majadahonda; Carabanchel; Leganés B Racing de Santander B Real Unión; Izarra; Andorra; Gáldar; Novelda; Sóller; FC Andorra; Lorca; San Pedro; Guadix; Mar Menor; Zamora
- Top goalscorer: Quini (26 goals)
- Best goalkeeper: César Quesada (0.57 goals)
- Biggest home win: Espanyol B 8–0 FC Andorra (5 April 1998)
- Biggest away win: Guadix 0–6 Málaga (12 April 1998)
- Highest scoring: Sóller 5–4 Figueres (29 March 1998)

The 1997–98 season of Segunda División B of Spanish football started August 1997 and ended May 1998.

== Summary before the 1997–98 season ==
Playoffs de Ascenso:

- Sporting de Gijón B
- Talavera
- Manchego
- Deportivo de La Coruña B
- Aurrerá
- Numancia (P)
- Barakaldo
- Lemona
- Gimnàstic de Tarragona
- Elche (P)
- Gramenet
- Figueres
- Córdoba
- Xerez (P)
- Jaén (P)
- Recreativo de Huelva

Relegated from Segunda División:

- Almería (dissolved)
- Real Madrid B
- Barcelona B
- Écija

Promoted from Tercera División:

- Caudal (from Group 2)
- Racing de Santander B (from Group 3)
- Elgoibar (from Group 4)
- Amurrio (from Group 4)
- Ontinyent (from Group 6)
- Novelda (from Group 6)
- Leganés B (from Group 7)
- Burgos (from Group 8)
- Zamora (from Group 8)
- Motril (from Group 9)
- Isla Cristina (from Group 10)
- Sóller (from Group 11)
- Pájara Playas (from Group 12)
- Lorca (from Group 13)
- Moralo (from Group 14)
- Plasencia (from Group 14)
- Andorra (from Group 16)

Relegated:

- Aranjuez
- Moscardó
- Celta de Vigo B
- Marino de Luanco
- Real Sociedad B
- Zamudio
- Zalla
- Logroñés B
- Manlleu
- Benidorm
- Sant Andreu
- Llíria
- Ejido
- Vélez
- Realejos
- Marbella
- Huesca

Relegated by Real Madrid B relegation:

- Real Madrid C

Occupied the vacant spot by Real Madrid C relegation:

- Rayo Majadahonda (occupied the vacant spot of Real Madrid C)

== Group I ==
Teams from Asturias, Castilla–La Mancha, Community of Madrid, Extremadura and Galicia.

=== Teams ===
Location of teams in Segunda División B Gr. 1 1997–98

Team	Founded	Home city	Stadium
As Pontes	1960	As Pontes de García Rodríguez, Galicia	O Poboado
Real Avilés Industrial	1903	Avilés, Asturias	Román Sánchez Puerta
Cacereño	1919	Cáceres, Extremadura	Príncipe Felipe
Carabanchel	1916	Carabanchel, Community of Madrid	La Mina
Caudal	1918	Mieres, Asturias	Hermanos Antuña
Deportivo La Coruña B	1914	A Coruña, Galicia	Anexo de Riazor
Fuenlabrada	1975	Fuenlabrada, Madrid	La Aldehuela
Getafe	1983	Getafe, Madrid	Juan de la Cierva
Langreo	1961	Langreo, Asturias	Ganzábal
Leganés B	1959	Leganés, Community of Madrid	Luis Rodríguez de Miguel
Lugo	1953	Lugo, Galicia	Anxo Carro
Moralo	1923	Navalmoral de la Mata, Extremadura	Municipal de Deportes
Oviedo B	1930	Oviedo, Asturias	El Requexón
Plasencia	1940	Plasencia, Extremadura	Ciudad Deportiva de Plasencia
Pontevedra	1941	Pontevedra, Galicia	Pasarón
Racing Ferrol	1919	Ferrol, Galicia	A Malata
Rayo Majadahonda	1976	Majadahonda, Community of Madrid	Cerro del Espino
Real Madrid B	1930	Madrid, Madrid	Ciudad Deportiva
Sporting Gijón B	1960	Gijón, Asturias	Mareo
Talavera	1948	Talavera de la Reina, Castilla–La Mancha	El Prado

=== League table ===
Pos	Team	Pld	W	D	L	GF	GA	GD	Pts	Qualification or relegation
1	Cacereño	38	24	6	8	72	36	+36	78	Qualification for Play-Off
2	Real Madrid B	38	23	3	12	70	40	+30	72	Qualification for Play-Off
3	Deportivo de La Coruña B	38	22	6	10	51	27	+24	72	Qualification for Play-Off
4	Talavera	38	21	8	9	65	46	+19	71	Qualification for Play-Off
5	Racing Ferrol	38	21	8	9	59	38	+21	71	
6	Lugo	38	18	11	9	55	46	+9	65	
7	Getafe	38	17	6	15	45	40	+5	57	
8	Sporting de Gijón B	38	14	15	9	48	44	+4	57	
9	Fuenlabrada	38	15	9	14	54	55	−1	54	
10	Pontevedra	38	14	11	13	43	40	+3	53	
11	Langreo	38	12	14	12	49	49	0	50	
12	Oviedo B	38	12	12	14	51	53	−2	48	
13	Plasencia	38	12	10	16	48	54	−6	46	
14	Moralo	38	12	7	19	38	55	−17	43	
15	Caudal	38	10	12	16	43	57	−14	42	
16	Avilés	38	9	13	16	37	47	−10	40	Qualification for Play-out
17	As Pontes	38	10	9	19	38	56	−18	39	Relegation to 1998–99 Tercera División
18	Rayo Majadahonda	38	9	8	21	43	59	−16	35	Relegation to 1998–99 Tercera División
19	Carabanchel	38	5	13	20	29	62	−33	28	Relegation to 1998–99 Tercera División
20	Leganés B	38	7	5	26	35	69	−34	26	Relegation to 1998–99 Tercera División

Source: BDFútbol
Rules for classification: 1) points; 2) head-to-head points; 3) head-to-head goal difference; 4) head-to-head goals scored; 5) goal difference; 6) number of goals scored.

=== Results ===
Home \ Away	ASP	AVI	CAC	CAR	CAU	DEP	FUE	GET	LAN	LEG	LUG	MOR	OVI	PLA	PNT	RFE	RMJ	RMB	SPG	TAL
As Pontes	—	1–1	1–3	2–2	3–0	0–1	1–1	0–2	1–1	3–1	1–0	1–0	2–0	1–2	1–0	1–1	3–2	4–0	1–2	0–2
Real Avilés Ind.	0–0	—	0–0	5–0	0–0	0–1	0–1	1–0	0–2	2–2	1–2	0–0	2–1	0–0	2–0	1–0	2–3	2–2	2–1	0–2
Cacereño	3–0	2–0	—	2–0	1–1	1–0	0–1	3–0	5–2	3–1	2–1	2–0	0–3	2–1	1–2	2–2	2–0	2–1	2–1	3–1
Carabanchel	2–0	0–2	0–1	—	3–1	0–3	0–2	0–0	1–1	0–2	1–1	0–1	1–1	1–1	0–0	0–1	3–2	1–4	1–1	0–0
Caudal	1–0	1–1	1–1	2–1	—	0–1	1–1	0–1	1–2	2–0	1–1	2–1	4–2	2–1	2–0	0–2	0–0	2–4	1–1	1–2
Deportivo B	2–0	2–0	2–1	1–0	4–0	—	1–1	1–0	0–1	0–1	3–1	4–1	0–0	4–0	1–0	1–1	2–1	0–1	2–0	1–2
Fuenlabrada	1–1	1–1	4–0	1–3	1–0	0–2	—	1–0	2–4	4–0	0–0	1–3	2–3	1–0	4–0	1–0	1–0	0–4	1–2	1–1
Getafe	4–0	2–1	1–5	4–2	0–0	1–2	1–0	—	2–1	2–0	1–2	1–2	0–2	3–2	1–0	1–0	2–1	3–1	0–1	3–0
Langreo	2–0	1–3	0–0	0–0	3–2	0–0	1–3	0–0	—	2–1	1–1	1–1	2–2	1–1	2–0	4–0	0–0	1–3	0–1	3–2
Leganés B	0–2	1–0	0–3	2–0	1–1	0–1	1–2	1–1	1–2	—	2–3	1–2	2–0	2–1	0–1	1–3	3–0	0–1	1–2	1–3
Lugo	2–1	1–0	0–2	0–0	3–1	2–0	2–1	2–0	3–0	3–1	—	4–1	4–3	1–0	1–1	1–0	2–2	1–1	0–0	1–0
Moralo	0–0	1–1	3–0	1–4	0–1	1–2	1–1	0–3	2–1	1–0	1–0	—	2–2	3–1	0–1	0–2	3–1	1–0	0–1	1–3
Oviedo B	1–0	2–1	0–2	0–0	4–1	2–2	1–3	1–1	1–3	0–0	1–2	0–0	—	1–0	0–1	2–3	1–0	1–3	1–1	2–0
Plasencia	5–1	2–2	0–3	0–0	3–2	3–2	4–1	2–1	1–0	2–1	1–1	1–0	1–2	—	1–1	0–1	3–0	1–2	1–1	1–0
Pontevedra	1–0	1–1	2–2	2–1	0–0	0–1	4–0	0–0	2–1	3–2	3–1	2–0	3–3	0–0	—	3–0	1–3	0–1	3–3	1–1
Racing Ferrol	3–2	1–0	3–2	2–0	3–1	0–0	5–3	1–0	2–1	7–1	1–1	3–2	1–0	2–1	0–2	—	1–1	4–0	1–0	1–1
Rayo Majadahonda	0–0	1–2	0–2	2–0	2–4	1–0	2–3	2–0	0–0	2–1	4–1	1–2	0–1	2–3	1–3	0–2	—	0–1	2–2	3–0
Real Madrid B	6–1	3–0	0–2	4–1	0–1	0–1	2–0	2–3	0–0	3–0	2–0	4–1	3–0	2–0	1–0	1–0	0–1	—	3–0	1–3
Sporting B	1–3	4–1	1–0	4–0	2–1	2–0	2–2	0–1	1–1	1–1	1–3	2–0	0–4	1–1	1–0	0–0	0–0	2–1	—	2–2
Talavera	1–0	3–0	1–5	4–1	2–2	3–1	2–1	1–0	4–2	1–0	5–1	1–0	1–1	4–1	1–0	1–0	3–1	1–3	1–1	—

Source: BDFútbol
Legend: Blue = home team win; Yellow = draw; Red = away team win.

=== Top goalscorers ===
Goalscorers	Goals	Team
(Spain) Quini	26	Talavera
(Spain) Vicente Borge	21	Lugo
(Switzerland) Toño Ruiz	21	Caudal
(Spain) Nacho Sierra	20	Getafe
(Spain) Edu Rodríguez	19	Cacereño

=== Top goalkeepers ===
Goalkeeper	Goals	Matches	Average	Team
(Spain) Dani Mallo	22	28	0.79	Deportivo de La Coruña B
(Spain) Iñigo Arteaga	34	35	0.97	Racing de Ferrol
(Spain) Raúl Valbuena	37	36	1.03	Real Madrid B
(Spain) Sergio Sánchez	32	30	1.07	Sporting de Gijón B
(Spain) Raúl Chilet	40	36	1.11	Talavera

== Group II ==
Teams from Aragon, Basque Country, Castile and León and Navarre.

=== Teams ===
Location of teams in Segunda División B Gr. 2 1997–98

Team	Founded	Home city	Stadium
Andorra CF	1956	Andorra, Aragon	Juan Antonio Endeiza
Amurrio	1949	Amurrio, Basque Country	Basarte
Athletic Bilbao B	1964	Bilbao, Basque Country	Lezama
Aurrerá Vitoria	1935	Vitoria, Basque Country	Olanrabe
Barakaldo	1917	Barakaldo, Basque Country	Lasesarre
Beasain	1905	Beasain, Basque Country	Loinaz
Bermeo	1950	Bermeo, Basque Country	Itxas Gane
Burgos	1985	Burgos, Castile and León	El Plantío
Cultural Leonesa	1923	León, Castile and León	Antonio Amilvia
Elgoibar	1917	Elgoibar, Basque Country	Mintxeta
Gernika	1922	Gernika, Basque Country	Urbieta
Gimnástica Torrelavega	1907	Torrelavega, Cantabria	El Malecón
Izarra	1924	Estella-Lizarra, Navarre	Merkatondoa
Lemona	1923	Lemoa, Basque Country	Arlonagusia
Osasuna B	1962	Aranguren, Navarre	Tajonar
Racing de Santander B	1993	Santander, Cantabria	La Albericia
Real Unión	1915	Irun, Basque Country	Stadium Gal
Valladolid B	1942	Valladolid, Castile and León	Ciudad Deportiva del Real Valladolid
Zamora	1968	Zamora, Castile and León	La Vaguada
Zaragoza B	1958	Zaragoza, Aragon	Ciudad Deportiva del Real Zaragoza

=== League Table ===
Pos	Team	Pld	W	D	L	GF	GA	GD	Pts	Qualification or relegation
1	Barakaldo	38	23	7	8	57	28	+29	76	Qualification for Play-Off
2	Bilbao Athletic	38	22	8	8	51	35	+16	74	Qualification for Play-Off
3	Beasain	38	21	10	7	53	27	+26	73	Qualification for Play-Off
4	Cultural Leonesa	38	20	12	6	53	31	+22	72	Qualification for Play-Off
5	Aurrerá	38	21	9	8	52	25	+27	72	
6	Zaragoza B	38	19	11	8	60	29	+31	68	
7	Gimnástica de Torrelavega	38	16	8	14	48	44	+4	56	
8	Elgoibar	38	14	9	15	41	45	−4	51	
9	Lemona	38	12	15	11	33	30	+3	51	
10	Gernika	38	15	6	17	39	46	−7	51	
11	Osasuna B	38	13	10	15	30	27	+3	49	
12	Valladolid B	38	13	9	16	37	48	−11	48	
13	Amurrio	38	13	6	19	34	48	−14	45	
14	Bermeo	38	12	9	17	35	52	−17	45	
15	Burgos	38	11	12	15	31	37	−6	45	
16	Zamora	38	11	9	18	41	50	−9	42	Qualification for Play-out
17	Racing de Santander B	38	9	13	16	38	50	−12	40	Relegation to 1998–99 Tercera División
18	Real Unión	38	8	8	22	32	56	−24	32	Relegation to 1998–99 Tercera División
19	Izarra	38	7	11	20	35	48	−13	32	Relegation to 1998–99 Tercera División
20	Andorra	38	7	4	27	22	66	−44	25	Relegation to 1998–99 Tercera División

Source: BDFútbol
Rules for classification: 1) points; 2) head-to-head points; 3) head-to-head goal difference; 4) head-to-head goals scored; 5) goal difference; 6) number of goals scored.

=== Results ===
Home \ Away	AMU	AND	ATH	AUR	BAR	BEA	BER	BUR	CUL	ELG	GER	GIM	IZA	LEM	OSA	RAC	RUN	VLD	ZAM	ZAR
Amurrio	—	3–1	1–1	0–2	0–1	0–1	3–0	0–1	1–2	0–2	1–2	0–3	1–1	1–1	1–0	1–0	1–0	2–0	3–2	0–3
Andorra CF	0–2	—	0–1	0–3	0–0	0–1	0–1	0–3	1–0	0–1	1–3	0–2	3–2	0–0	0–1	2–2	1–0	0–1	2–0	0–3
Athletic B	2–1	3–0	—	2–2	0–2	1–0	1–0	1–0	1–1	2–0	2–1	0–0	2–0	2–0	0–3	3–1	0–0	1–0	3–0	1–1
Aurrerá Vitoria	2–0	2–1	3–0	—	0–1	1–1	0–0	0–0	0–0	1–0	3–1	3–0	0–0	1–0	1–0	2–1	3–0	1–0	2–2	0–1
Barakaldo	2–0	1–0	3–4	1–0	—	1–2	2–0	2–0	2–0	1–2	0–2	1–0	0–0	2–1	3–1	2–0	3–1	2–0	0–1	2–2
Beasain	2–1	2–0	3–0	0–2	3–1	—	1–0	1–0	1–1	2–0	0–2	4–2	0–0	1–0	3–0	2–1	1–0	5–0	0–1	1–1
Bermeo	1–1	4–1	0–3	1–1	1–5	0–1	—	2–0	1–2	1–1	3–2	2–0	0–0	0–0	1–0	0–0	1–4	0–3	1–0	2–1
Burgos	1–2	2–0	3–2	0–3	0–0	0–3	1–1	—	0–1	0–0	2–2	2–0	2–1	2–0	0–0	1–0	4–1	0–1	0–0	0–0
Cultural Leonesa	2–2	4–0	1–2	1–0	2–2	0–0	4–1	1–0	—	2–1	2–0	1–2	1–0	2–2	1–0	2–2	6–1	1–0	1–0	2–1
Elgoibar	0–1	0–1	1–2	2–5	0–2	2–1	3–1	1–1	2–0	—	1–0	1–2	2–0	2–3	1–0	1–1	3–0	2–3	3–2	1–1
Gernika	0–1	2–1	0–1	2–0	0–2	1–2	1–0	1–0	2–0	1–2	—	1–0	2–0	0–0	0–3	0–0	0–0	1–2	3–0	0–2
Gim. Torrelavega	1–0	2–0	2–1	1–1	2–1	2–2	1–3	3–0	1–1	0–1	4–0	—	1–0	1–0	1–1	1–3	2–1	1–0	1–2	0–1
Izarra	3–0	4–1	2–3	0–1	2–2	0–2	1–1	0–1	0–0	3–0	1–1	1–1	—	0–1	0–5	2–1	1–2	3–0	3–2	1–2
Lemona	2–0	2–0	0–0	2–0	0–1	1–1	1–0	2–2	1–3	0–0	0–0	0–0	2–0	—	2–0	1–0	0–0	3–0	0–0	3–1
Osasuna B	0–1	0–2	0–1	0–1	0–1	1–0	1–0	1–0	0–0	0–0	3–0	1–0	0–2	0–0	—	2–0	1–0	1–1	2–1	1–1
Racing B	2–0	3–2	0–1	0–2	0–3	3–1	3–0	0–0	0–0	0–0	0–1	0–2	1–0	2–1	0–0	—	3–1	1–1	1–1	1–2
Real Unión	1–1	2–0	2–1	1–2	0–1	1–1	1–2	1–0	2–3	1–2	0–1	3–2	1–0	1–0	1–2	1–1	—	0–0	0–2	0–1
Valladolid B	0–2	3–0	2–0	2–0	0–1	0–0	1–2	0–1	0–1	2–1	1–4	2–2	3–2	0–0	1–0	2–2	0–0	—	3–2	1–3
Zamora	2–0	1–2	0–0	2–1	0–0	0–1	0–1	4–2	0–1	0–0	4–0	1–2	1–0	1–2	0–0	2–3	1–0	1–1	—	3–2
Zaragoza B	2–0	0–0	0–1	0–1	2–1	1–1	2–1	0–0	0–1	3–0	2–0	3–1	0–0	4–0	0–0	5–0	3–2	0–1	4–0	—

Source: BDFútbol
Legend: Blue = home team win; Yellow = draw; Red = away team win.

=== Top goalscorers ===
Goalscorers	Goals	Team
(Spain) Javi Peña	25	Zaragoza B
(Spain) Chili	22	Gimnástica de Torrelavega
(Spain) Paco García	19	Zamora
(Spain) Aitor Bouzo	15	Barakaldo
(Spain) Ángel Luis Pérez	15	Cultural Leonesa

=== Top goalkeepers ===
Goalkeeper	Goals	Matches	Average	Team
(Spain) Jon Ander López	23	36	0.64	Barakaldo
(Spain) Iban Triviño	24	37	0.65	Aurrerá
(Spain) Javier Jauregui	25	37	0.68	Beasain
(Spain) Manuel Almunia	21	31	0.68	Osasuna B
(Spain) César Láinez	21	28	0.75	Zaragoza B

== Group III ==
Teams from Andorra, Balearic Islands, Canary Islands, Catalonia and Valencian Community.

=== Teams ===
Location of teams in Segunda División B Gr. 3 1997–98
Canary Islands

Team	Founded	Home city	Stadium
FC Andorra	1942	Andorra la Vella, Andorra	Comunal
Barcelona B	1970	Barcelona, Catalonia	Mini Estadi
Castellón	1922	Castellón de la Plana, Valencian Community	Nou Castàlia
Espanyol B	1994	Barcelona, Catalonia	La Caixa
Figueres	1919	Figueres, Catalonia	Vilatenim
Gáldar	1988	Gáldar, Canary Islands	Barrial
Gandía	1947	Gandia, Valencian Community	Guillermo Olagüe
Gavà	1929	Gavà, Catalonia	La Bòbila
Gimnàstic de Tarragona	1886	Tarragona, Catalonia	Nou Estadi Tarragona
Gramenet	1994	Santa Coloma de Gramenet, Catalonia	Nou Camp Municipal
Hospitalet	1957	L'Hospitalet de Llobregat, Catalonia	Municipal de Deportes
Mallorca B	1967	Palma de Mallorca, Balearic Islands	Lluís Sitjar
Mensajero	1924	Santa Cruz de La Palma, Canary Islands	Silvestre Carrillo
Novelda	1925	Novelda, Valencian Community	La Magdalena
Ontinyent	1931	Ontinyent, Valencian Community	El Clariano
Pájara Playas de Jandía	1996	Pájara, Canary Islands	Benito Alonso
Sabadell	1903	Sabadell, Catalonia	Nova Creu Alta
Sóller	1954	Sóller, Balearic Islands	Camp d'en Maiol
Terrassa	1906	Terrassa, Catalonia	Olímpic de Terrassa
Valencia B	1944	Valencia, Valencian Community	Ciudad Deportiva de Paterna

=== League Table ===
Pos	Team	Pld	W	D	L	GF	GA	GD	Pts	Qualification or relegation
1	FC Barcelona B	38	22	7	9	70	39	+31	73	Qualification for Play-Off
2	Terrassa	38	21	8	9	70	44	+26	71	Qualification for Play-Off
3	Mallorca B	38	19	14	5	55	32	+23	71	Qualification for Play-Off
4	Espanyol B	38	18	13	7	61	33	+28	67	Qualification for Play-Off
5	Castellón	38	17	13	8	58	29	+29	64	
6	Gavà	38	13	16	9	54	38	+16	55	
7	Figueres	38	15	10	13	62	47	+15	55	
8	Pájara Playas	38	14	12	12	41	42	−1	54	
9	Gandía	38	14	12	12	37	34	+3	54	
10	Gramenet	38	13	13	12	38	39	−1	52	
11	Sabadell	38	14	9	15	43	44	−1	51	
12	L'Hospitalet	38	11	15	12	36	34	+2	48	
13	Ontinyent	38	13	8	17	51	54	−3	47	
14	Valencia Mestalla	38	12	11	15	39	41	−2	47	
15	Gimnàstic	38	11	13	14	37	43	−6	46	
16	Mensajero	38	12	10	16	45	63	−18	46	Qualification for Play-out
17	Gáldar	38	11	10	17	34	52	−18	43	Relegation to 1998–99 Tercera División
18	Novelda	38	10	12	16	41	51	−10	42	Relegation to 1998–99 Tercera División
19	Sóller	38	9	10	19	43	68	−25	37	Relegation to 1998–99 Tercera División
20	FC Andorra	38	1	4	33	14	102	−88	7	Relegation to 1998–99 Tercera División

Source: BDFutbol
Rules for classification: 1) points; 2) head-to-head points; 3) head-to-head goal difference; 4) head-to-head goals scored; 5) goal difference; 6) number of goals scored.

=== Results ===
Home \ Away	AND	BAR	CAS	ESP	FIG	GAL	GAN	GAV	GIM	GRA	HOS	MLL	MEN	NOV	ONT	PAJ	SAB	SOL	TER	VAL
FC Andorra	—	0–4	1–5	1–2	0–4	1–1	2–1	0–2	0–3	1–2	0–1	1–3	1–1	0–1	0–4	0–1	0–2	0–3	1–4	0–1
Barcelona B	2–1	—	0–1	2–0	1–1	6–0	2–0	1–1	3–1	2–0	2–0	3–1	3–0	2–2	3–0	1–0	3–0	2–2	3–0	1–0
Castellón	7–0	0–3	—	0–0	2–1	1–2	3–0	0–0	1–1	2–0	1–0	0–0	2–0	2–1	2–0	0–0	1–1	1–1	0–1	0–1
Espanyol B	8–0	2–1	1–1	—	2–0	2–1	0–0	1–2	2–1	1–0	2–3	0–0	0–0	4–0	2–1	0–2	2–0	1–2	1–0	2–1
Figueres	3–0	2–1	0–2	0–0	—	2–1	1–1	1–3	3–0	0–2	2–0	1–1	6–1	2–1	4–1	3–0	3–1	2–1	2–2	0–2
Gáldar	0–0	2–0	0–3	0–4	0–3	—	0–1	0–0	2–0	0–1	0–1	0–1	2–0	0–2	1–0	1–0	2–1	2–0	0–2	2–1
Gandía	2–0	1–2	0–0	0–1	1–1	0–2	—	0–0	2–0	1–0	1–3	1–2	3–1	2–1	2–1	1–2	0–0	2–0	2–1	2–1
Gavà	3–0	2–0	0–0	1–3	1–1	3–3	1–2	—	0–0	1–1	1–1	0–1	7–1	1–2	3–1	1–2	0–0	2–0	4–4	1–1
Gimnàstic	3–1	1–0	0–3	0–0	1–1	1–0	0–4	1–0	—	0–0	1–0	3–1	5–1	0–0	4–1	0–1	1–2	3–1	1–1	0–0
Gramenet	3–1	1–1	0–0	0–2	1–0	1–2	0–0	0–0	0–0	—	2–1	3–3	0–0	4–0	2–1	1–2	0–3	2–0	1–0	0–0
Hospitalet	1–0	1–1	0–1	1–1	1–0	0–0	0–1	1–2	1–1	1–1	—	2–0	2–0	0–0	0–0	2–2	1–1	1–1	6–1	1–0
Mallorca B	2–0	2–0	2–0	1–1	3–2	2–2	0–0	1–1	0–0	2–0	1–0	—	3–1	4–1	1–0	1–0	4–0	2–0	1–1	0–2
Mensajero	1–1	3–4	1–1	1–1	0–2	3–1	2–0	1–0	0–0	2–0	1–0	1–1	—	2–1	3–0	2–0	3–1	1–0	3–0	2–2
Novelda	4–1	0–1	2–2	2–2	0–1	1–1	1–1	1–3	2–0	0–2	1–1	0–0	2–1	—	0–0	1–1	1–0	3–0	1–2	1–2
Ontinyent	4–0	4–1	3–1	3–1	0–0	2–2	0–1	1–2	2–2	2–1	3–1	0–1	2–0	0–3	—	2–1	1–1	2–1	0–0	1–1
Pájara Playas	2–0	3–3	1–0	1–4	3–1	0–0	0–0	0–2	0–1	5–1	0–0	0–3	2–1	0–0	3–1	—	2–0	1–0	1–1	0–2
Sabadell	2–0	2–0	2–3	0–2	2–0	0–0	1–0	0–1	2–1	0–0	0–1	2–2	1–0	2–1	0–1	3–0	—	1–0	0–1	1–1
Sóller	2–0	1–2	0–5	1–1	5–4	2–1	1–1	2–1	3–1	3–3	0–0	0–0	3–3	1–2	0–4	1–1	2–5	—	1–0	0–3
Terrassa	5–0	2–3	3–1	3–2	3–2	4–1	1–1	2–0	2–0	0–1	2–0	2–0	4–1	3–0	4–2	0–0	4–2	2–0	—	2–0
Valencia B	3–0	0–1	1–4	1–1	1–1	1–0	1–0	2–2	1–0	0–2	1–1	2–3	0–1	1–0	0–1	2–2	0–2	1–3	0–1	—

Source: BDFutbol
Legend: Blue = home team win; Yellow = draw; Red = away team win.

=== Top goalscorers ===
Goalscorers	Goals	Team
(Spain) Mario Rosas	19	FC Barcelona B
(Spain) Diego Ribera	19	Espanyol B
(Spain) Julián Sanz	16	Castellón
(Spain) Paco López	16	Castellón
(Spain) Luis García	15	FC Barcelona B

=== Top goalkeepers ===
Goalkeeper	Goals	Matches	Average	Team
(Spain) Alfred Argensó	18	28	0.64	Espanyol B
(Spain) César Gálvez	26	35	0.74	Mallorca B
(Spain) Juan Pedro Espín	26	33	0.79	Gandía
(Spain) Antonio Morales	30	34	0.88	Gramenet
(Spain) David Pérez	30	33	0.91	L'Hospitalet

== Group IV ==
Teams from Andalusia, Castilla–La Mancha, Melilla and Region of Murcia.

=== Teams ===
Location of teams in Segunda División B Gr. 4 1997–98

Team	Founded	Home city	Stadium
Almería CF	1989	Almería, Andalusia	Juan Rojas
CP Almería	1983	Almería, Andalusia	Juan Rojas
Betis B	1962	Seville, Andalusia	Ciudad Deportiva Ruíz de Lopera
Cádiz	1910	Cádiz, Andalusia	Ramón de Carranza
Córdoba	1954	Córdoba, Andalusia	Nuevo Arcángel
Écija	1939	Écija, Andalusia	San Pablo
Granada	1931	Granada, Andalusia	Nuevo Los Cármenes
Guadix	1932	Guadix, Andalusia	Municipal
Isla Cristina	1934	Isla Cristina, Andalusia	Municipal de Isla Cristina
Lorca	1994	Lorca, Region of Murcia	San José
Málaga	1948	Málaga, Andalusia	La Rosaleda
Manchego	1929	Ciudad Real, Castilla–La Mancha	Príncipe Juan Carlos
Mar Menor	1980	San Javier, Region of Murcia	Pitín
Melilla	1976	Melilla	Álvarez Claro
Motril	1984	Motril, Andalusia	Escribano Castilla
Murcia	1919	Murcia, Region of Murcia	La Condomina
Recreativo de Huelva	1889	Huelva, Andalusia	Colombino
San Pedro	1974	San Pedro de Alcántara, Andalusia	Municipal de San Pedro
Sevilla B	1950	Seville, Andalusia	Viejo Nervión
Yeclano	1950	Yecla, Region of Murcia	La Constitución

=== League Table ===
Pos	Team	Pld	W	D	L	GF	GA	GD	Pts	Qualification or relegation
1	Málaga	38	21	10	7	56	25	+31	73	Qualification for Play-Off
2	Recreativo	38	18	13	7	39	22	+17	67	Qualification for Play-Off
3	Cádiz	38	18	11	9	49	34	+15	65	Qualification for Play-Off
4	Granada	38	16	13	9	42	27	+15	61	Qualification for Play-Off
5	Melilla	38	15	15	8	47	33	+14	60	
6	Córdoba	38	15	13	10	44	35	+9	58	
7	Almería	38	15	13	10	37	30	+7	58	
8	Murcia	38	13	15	10	38	32	+6	54	
9	Isla Cristina	38	13	13	12	45	46	−1	52	
10	Manchego	38	11	14	13	34	32	+2	47	
11	Sevilla Atlético	38	10	16	12	37	33	+4	46	
12	Betis B	38	13	7	18	45	61	−16	46	
13	Yeclano	38	11	12	15	27	41	−14	45	
14	Polideportivo Almería	38	9	18	11	42	40	+2	45	
15	Écija	38	11	12	15	32	48	−16	45	
16	Motril	38	11	11	16	34	54	−20	44	Qualification for Play-out
17	Lorca	38	9	15	14	45	47	−2	42	Relegation to 1998–99 Tercera División
18	San Pedro	38	8	16	14	36	43	−7	40	Relegation to 1998–99 Tercera División
19	Guadix	38	8	9	21	38	63	−25	33	Relegation to 1998–99 Tercera División
20	Mar Menor	38	8	8	22	31	52	−21	32	Relegation to 1998–99 Tercera División

Source: BDFutbol
Rules for classification: 1) points; 2) head-to-head points; 3) head-to-head goal difference; 4) head-to-head goals scored; 5) goal difference; 6) number of goals scored.

=== Results ===
Home \ Away	ACF	CPA	BET	CAD	COR	ECI	GRA	GUA	ICR	LOR	MGA	MAN	MAR	MEL	MOT	MUR	REC	SAP	SEV	YEC
Almería CF	—	2–0	1–2	0–2	1–1	2–1	0–0	3–2	3–0	1–0	1–0	1–0	0–0	2–1	2–1	2–1	0–0	2–1	0–0	0–1
CP Almería	0–0	—	2–2	2–2	0–0	2–0	1–0	1–0	3–0	1–2	0–0	0–0	1–0	0–3	2–2	0–1	1–2	3–0	2–0	0–0
Betis B	1–1	2–1	—	0–1	1–2	5–0	0–3	2–1	1–5	1–1	0–2	0–1	4–0	1–0	0–1	1–0	1–1	2–1	1–0	2–1
Cádiz	2–1	1–1	1–2	—	1–0	0–1	3–0	2–1	1–0	1–1	1–0	1–1	1–0	2–0	5–1	1–1	0–1	1–0	0–4	3–1
Córdoba	1–0	2–2	1–0	0–0	—	3–3	1–2	3–1	1–2	1–1	0–1	1–3	3–1	0–0	2–0	3–3	1–0	1–0	0–0	3–0
Écija	0–0	1–1	0–0	2–1	0–0	—	0–1	3–0	0–2	1–1	1–0	1–0	1–0	2–3	1–1	0–2	2–1	1–3	1–0	0–0
Granada	1–2	0–1	1–2	1–2	3–0	4–0	—	2–1	1–2	1–0	1–0	1–1	1–0	2–2	0–0	1–1	0–1	2–0	2–0	2–0
Guadix	1–0	2–0	2–2	0–2	2–0	2–3	0–1	—	2–1	2–2	0–6	1–0	0–0	0–0	2–0	0–1	0–1	3–2	1–2	1–1
Isla Cristina	1–1	1–1	2–1	3–3	0–0	3–1	0–0	1–1	—	1–1	1–4	0–2	2–1	2–1	2–0	0–0	2–1	0–0	1–0	1–0
Lorca	0–1	1–1	5–1	2–1	0–2	1–2	0–0	0–1	0–2	—	2–0	2–1	0–2	4–1	0–2	2–1	1–1	5–1	1–4	0–1
Málaga	0–0	3–3	3–0	2–0	1–1	2–0	0–0	2–0	3–2	1–0	—	1–0	4–1	1–0	1–1	1–3	1–0	1–1	2–0	4–1
Manchego	1–2	0–0	2–0	0–1	0–1	0–0	1–1	2–0	2–1	0–0	0–1	—	1–0	1–1	0–0	2–0	3–0	0–0	2–1	0–0
Mar Menor	1–1	3–2	5–2	0–3	2–2	1–1	1–3	2–1	1–0	0–2	0–1	2–0	—	1–3	1–1	0–1	0–1	0–1	0–0	0–1
Melilla	1–1	1–1	3–1	2–0	1–0	2–0	1–1	3–2	0–0	2–2	1–2	3–0	1–1	—	2–0	1–0	1–0	1–0	0–0	1–0
Motril	2–1	0–4	2–1	0–0	0–2	1–0	2–3	1–1	1–0	2–2	3–4	0–0	1–0	1–1	—	0–2	1–0	0–2	2–1	1–0
Murcia	2–0	2–1	2–0	1–1	1–0	0–1	0–0	1–1	2–2	1–1	0–0	2–2	3–1	0–2	1–0	—	0–2	0–0	0–0	2–0
Recreativo	2–1	1–1	3–0	0–0	2–1	1–0	2–0	1–1	2–0	1–1	0–0	3–1	1–0	1–0	2–0	1–0	—	1–1	1–1	2–0
San Pedro	1–0	2–0	1–1	1–2	1–3	0–0	0–0	5–2	3–1	0–0	0–2	1–1	0–2	0–0	4–1	0–0	0–0	—	1–1	1–1
Sevilla B	0–0	1–1	3–0	1–0	0–1	3–2	0–0	2–0	2–2	3–1	1–0	3–2	0–1	1–1	1–2	0–0	0–0	1–1	—	1–1
Yeclano	0–2	1–0	0–3	1–1	0–1	0–0	0–1	3–1	0–0	2–1	0–0	0–2	2–1	1–1	2–1	3–1	0–0	2–1	1–0	—

Source: BDFutbol
Legend: Blue = home team win; Yellow = draw; Red = away team win.

=== Top goalscorers ===
Goalscorers	Goals	Team
(Spain) Basti	15	Málaga
(Spain) Quique Romero	13	Betis B
(Spain) José Manuel Ortiz	13	San Pedro
(Spain) Fali Montes	12	Melilla
(Spain) Manuel Sousa	12	Almería

=== Top goalkeepers ===
Goalkeeper	Goals	Matches	Average	Team
(Spain) César Quesada	20	35	0.57	Recreativo
(Spain) Rafa González	23	37	0.62	Málaga
(Spain) Antonio Notario	26	35	0.74	Granada
(Spain) Vicente Rojas	27	35	0.77	Manchego
(Spain) Iñaki García	28	36	0.78	Murcia

== Play-offs ==
=== Group A ===
Pos	Team	Pld	W	D	L	GF	GA	GD	Pts	Promotion
1	Málaga (P)	6	3	1	2	12	8	+4	10	Promoted to Segunda División
2	Terrassa	6	3	1	2	9	8	+1	10	
3	Talavera	6	2	3	1	8	7	+1	9	
4	Beasain	6	0	3	3	6	12	−6	3	

Source: futbolme
Rules for classification: 1) points; 2) head-to-head points; 3) head-to-head goal difference; 4) head-to-head goals scored; 5) goal difference; 6) number of goals scored.
(P) Promoted

=== Group B ===
Pos	Team	Pld	W	D	L	GF	GA	GD	Pts	Promotion
1	Mallorca B (P)	6	5	0	1	12	8	+4	15	Promoted to Segunda División
2	Granada	6	3	0	3	9	7	+2	9	
3	Bilbao Athletic	6	2	1	3	7	9	−2	7	
4	Cacereño	6	1	1	4	6	10	−4	4	

Source: futbolme
Rules for classification: 1) points; 2) head-to-head points; 3) head-to-head goal difference; 4) head-to-head goals scored; 5) goal difference; 6) number of goals scored.
(P) Promoted

=== Group C ===
Pos	Team	Pld	W	D	L	GF	GA	GD	Pts	Promotion
1	FC Barcelona B (P)	6	4	1	1	14	5	+9	13	Promoted to Segunda División
2	Real Madrid B	6	2	2	2	6	10	−4	8	
3	Cádiz	6	2	2	2	10	8	+2	8	
4	Cultural Leonesa	6	0	3	3	7	14	−7	3	

Source: futbolme
Rules for classification: 1) points; 2) head-to-head points; 3) head-to-head goal difference; 4) head-to-head goals scored; 5) goal difference; 6) number of goals scored.
(P) Promoted

=== Group D ===
Pos	Team	Pld	W	D	L	GF	GA	GD	Pts	Promotion
1	Recreativo (P)	6	5	0	1	7	3	+4	15	Promoted to Segunda División
2	Barakaldo	6	2	2	2	8	8	0	8	
3	Espanyol B	6	2	1	3	10	6	+4	7	
4	Deportivo de La Coruña B	6	1	1	4	6	14	−8	4	

Source: futbolme
Rules for classification: 1) points; 2) head-to-head points; 3) head-to-head goal difference; 4) head-to-head goals scored; 5) goal difference; 6) number of goals scored.
(P) Promoted

== Play-out ==
=== Semifinal ===
Team 1	Agg.	Team 2	1st leg	2nd leg
Avilés	3–1	Zamora	0–0	3–1
Mensajero	1–2	Motril	0–0	1–2

=== Final ===
Team 1	Agg.	Team 2	1st leg	2nd leg
Zamora	2–2 (a)	Mensajero	2–2	0–0
