= David Darmon =

French footballer (born 1974)

Personal information
- Date of birth: 11 March 1974 (age 52)
- Place of birth: Sète
- Position: Midfielder

Senior career*
Years	Team	Apps	(Gls)
–1997	FC Sète		
1997–1999	Nîmes Olympique		
1999–2000	ASOA Valence		
2000	FC Gueugnon		
2001	Racing de Ferrol		
2001–2003	CD Leganés		
2003–2004	Elche CF		
2004–2005	Racing de Ferrol		
2005–2006	Águilas CF		
2006–2007	Benidorm CD		
2007–2008	AS Béziers		
2009–2010	Jumilla CF		
- * Club domestic league appearances and goals

David Darmon (born 11 March 1974) is a retired French football midfielder.
