= Alfonso Alarcón =

Spanish footballer (born 1954)

Personal information
- Full name: Alfonso Alarcón Abellán
- Date of birth: 23 September 1947 (age 79)
- Place of birth: La Alberca, Murcia, Spain
- Height: 1.75 m (5 ft 9 in)
- Position: Forward

Senior career*
Years	Team	Apps	(Gls)
1968–1969	CE Sabadell	2	(0)
1969–1973	Gimnàstic de Tarragona	36	(8)
1973–1978	Real Oviedo	133	(38)
1978–1982	Racing de Santander	86	(22)
- * Club domestic league appearances and goals

Alfonso Alarcón Abellán (born 23 September 1947) is a Spanish retired footballer. He primarily played for Real Oviedo and Racing de Santander throughout the 1970s and the early 1980s.

== Career ==
Alarcón began his career with the Catalan club CE Sabadell though he only made two appearances throughout the 1968–69 season despite an otherwise good season. Following this, he became a reserve player for Gimnàstic de Tarragona where until being promoted to the club's Starting XI for the 1972–73 Segunda División. Despite this, he caught the attention of Real Oviedo manager Sabino Barinaga and signed him for the club. His debut during the 1973–74 season saw him be part of the winning squad of the historic victory over Deportivo de La Coruña to claim the 1973 Trofeo Emma Cuervo. He remained within the club throughout the next four seasons, establishing himself within the Starting XI throughout La Liga, the Segunda División as well as in friendlies across his tenure. He then played for Racing de Santander for their 1978–79 season after Quinito returned to Portugal and the club were looking for a new forward to replace him. However, his debut season with the club had been rough as they ended up relegated from La Liga by the end of the season. However, despite a near relegation in the following 1979–80 season, he oversaw the club achieve their promotion by during their 1980–81 season and retired the following season.
