= Iñigo Arteaga =

Association football player

Personal information
- Full name: Iñigo Arteaga Nieto
- Date of birth: 16 December 1972 (age 53)
- Place of birth: San Sebastián, Spain
- Height: 1.85 m (6 ft 1 in)
- Position: Goalkeeper

Team information
- Current team: Espanyol (goalkeeping coach)

Youth career
- Real Sociedad

Senior career*
Years	Team	Apps	(Gls)
–1995	Real Sociedad B	80	(0)
1995–1996	Real Sociedad	0	(0)
1997–1998	Racing de Ferrol	48	(1)
1998–2000	Chaves	25+	(0+)
2000–2002	Burgos	42	(0)
2002–2004	Real Unión	42	(0)

Managerial career
- 2004–2008: Real Unión (goalkeepingr coach)
- 2008–2010: Cádiz (goalkeeping coach)
- 2010–2011: Villarreal B (goalkeeping coach)
- 2011: Olympiacos Volos (goalkeeping coach)
- 2011–2012: AO Kerkyra (goalkeeping coach)
- 2012–2013: Almería (goalkeeping coach)
- 2013–2014: Osasuna (goalkeeping coach)
- 2014–2016: Málaga (goalkeeping coach)
- 2016–2017: Rubin Kazan (goalkeeping coach)
- 2018–2019: Watford (goalkeeping coach)
- 2021–2022: Al Sadd (goalkeeping coach)
- 2023–: Espanyol (goalkeeping coach)
- * Club domestic league appearances and goals

Iñigo Arteaga Nieto (born 16 December 1972) is a Spanish former professional footballer who played as a goalkeeper. He is currently the goalkeeping coach of La Liga club RCD Espanyol.

== Career ==
=== Club career ===
Arteaga started his career with Spanish La Liga side Real Sociedad. Before the second half of 1996–97, Arteaga signed for Racing de Ferrol in the Spanish third division, where he became the first player to score from a goal kick during a 2–0 win over Moralo.

In 1998, Arteaga signed for Portuguese top flight club Chaves, where he made over 25 league appearances and scored 0 goals and suffered relegation to the Portuguese second division. In 2000, he signed for Burgos in the Spanish third division, helping them earn promotion to the Spanish second division.

=== Managerial career ===
In 2014, Arteaga was appointed goalkeeper coach of Spanish La Liga team Málaga. In 2016, he was appointed goalkeeper coach of Rubin in Russia. In 2018, he was appointed goalkeeper coach of English Premier League outfit Watford. In 2021, Arteaga was appointed goalkeeping coach of Al Sadd in Qatar.

On 4 July 2023, Arteaga was appointed goalkeeping coach of Segunda División club RCD Espanyol.
