= Ribadeo FC =

Spanish football club

Ribadeo
- Full name: Ribadeo Fútbol Club
- Founded: 1913; 113 years ago
- Stadium: Estadio Municipal Pepe Barrera
- Capacity: 2,500
- President: Valentín Coto Pérez
- Head coach: Dani Moirón
- League: Primera Futgal – Group 3
- 2025–26: Primera Futgal – Group 3, 3rd of 18
Home colours	Away colours

Ribadeo Fútbol Club is a Spanish football team based in Ribadeo, Province of Lugo, in the autonomous community of Galicia. Founded in 1940 it currently plays in Primera Futgal – Group 3, holding home games at Estadio Municipal Pepe Barrera, which has a capacity of 2,500 spectators.

The club organises the Trofeo Emma Cuervo, a friendly tournament consisting of football clubs across Galicia.

== Season to season ==
Season	Tier	Division	Place	Copa del Rey
1940–1955	—	Regional	—	
1955–56	4	Serie A	4th	
1956–57	4	3ª	18th	
1957–58	4	Serie A	4th	
1958–59	5	1ª Reg.		
1959–60	5	1ª Reg.		
1960–61	4	Serie A	7th	
1961–62	4	Serie A	5th	
1962–63	4	Serie A	7th	
1963–64	4	Serie A	3rd	
1964–65	DNP			
1965–66	DNP			
1966–67	5	1ª Reg.	3rd	
1967–68	5	1ª Reg.		
1968–69	5	1ª Reg.	4th	
1969–70	5	1ª Reg.	3rd	
1970–71	5	1ª Reg.	3rd	
1971–72	5	1ª Reg.	5th	
1972–73	5	1ª Reg.	10th	
1973–74	5	1ª Reg.	5th	

Season	Tier	Division	Place	Copa del Rey
1974–75	5	1ª Reg.	10th	
1975–76	5	1ª Reg.	4th	
1976–77	5	1ª Reg.	7th	
1977–78	6	1ª Reg.	3rd	
1978–79	5	Reg. Pref.	18th	
1979–80	6	1ª Reg.	15th	
1980–81	5	Reg. Pref.	17th	
1981–82	5	Reg. Pref.	14th	
1982–83	5	Reg. Pref.	16th	
1983–84	5	Reg. Pref.	20th	
1984–85	6	1ª Reg.	18th	
1985–86	6	1ª Reg.	2nd	
1986–87	6	1ª Reg.	2nd	
1987–88	6	1ª Reg.	3rd	
1988–89	6	1ª Reg.	1st	
1989–90	5	Reg. Pref.	15th	
1990–91	6	1ª Reg.	1st	
1991–92	5	Reg. Pref.	12th	
1992–93	5	Reg. Pref.	3rd	
1993–94	5	Reg. Pref.	3rd	

Season	Tier	Division	Place	Copa del Rey
1994–95	5	Reg. Pref.	1st	
1995–96	4	3ª	12th	
1996–97	4	3ª	20th	
1997–98	5	Reg. Pref.	10th	
1998–99	5	Reg. Pref.	4th	
1999–2000	5	Reg. Pref.	10th	
2000–01	5	Reg. Pref.	8th	
2001–02	5	Reg. Pref.	17th	
2002–03	6	1ª Reg.	14th	
2003–04	7	2ª Reg.	4th	
2004–05	7	2ª Reg.	1st	
2005–06	6	1ª Reg.	13th	
2006–07	6	1ª Aut.	6th	
2007–08	6	1ª Aut.	3rd	
2008–09	6	1ª Aut.	6th	
2009–10	6	1ª Aut.	10th	
2010–11	6	1ª Aut.	2nd	
2011–12	5	Pref. Aut.	14th	
2012–13	5	Pref. Aut.	7th	
2013–14	5	Pref. Aut.	1st	

Season	Tier	Division	Place	Copa del Rey
2014–15	4	3ª	6th	
2015–16	4	3ª	18th	
2016–17	5	Pref.	7th	
2017–18	5	Pref.	4th	
2018–19	5	Pref.	6th	
2019–20	5	Pref.	10th	
2020–21	5	Pref.	6th	
2021–22	6	Pref.	7th	
2022–23	6	Pref.	10th	
2023–24	6	Pref.	13th	
2024–25	6	Pref. Futgal	15th	
2025–26	7	1ª Futgal		

- 5 seasons in Tercera División

== Honours ==
- Preferente Autonómica: 2013–14
