= CD Isla Cristina =

Spanish football team (1934–1999)

Isla Cristina
- Full name: Club Deportivo Isla Cristina
- Founded: 1934
- Dissolved: 1999
- Ground: Municipal, Isla Cristina, Huelva, Andalusia, Spain
- Capacity: 5,000
- 1998–99: 2ªB – Group 4, 20th
Home colours

Club Deportivo Isla Cristina were a Spanish football team based in Isla Cristina, in the autonomous community of Andalusia. Founded in 1934 and dissolved in 1999, they played their home matches at Campo Municipal de Isla Cristina, with a capacity of 5,000 people.

== History ==
Founded in 1934, Isla Cristina played in the regional leagues until 1994, when they achieved promotion to Tercera División. In the 1997 play-offs, the club achieved a first-ever promotion to Segunda División B after leading their group.

After an impressive ninth position in the 1997–98 season (which included a 4–4 aggregate victory on away goals over La Liga side Sevilla FC in the 1997–98 Copa del Rey), the club had a disastrous 1998–99 campaign, which ended with just four points in 38 rounds, and a record number of seven managers during the entire season; the record of managers was only surpassed by CD Eldense in 2017.

Shortly after Isla Cristina's relegation, the club folded, and a new club called Isla Cristina FC was founded shortly after.

== Season to season ==
Season	Tier	Division	Place	Copa del Rey
1946–47	4	1ª Reg.	1st	
1947–48	4	1ª Reg.	3rd	
1948–49	4	1ª Reg.	(R)	
1949–1960	—	Regional	—	
1960–61	4	1ª Reg.	9th	
1961–62	4	1ª Reg.	5th	
1962–63	5	2ª Reg.	2nd	
1963–64	5	2ª Reg.	2nd	
1964–65	5	2ª Reg.	7th	
1965–66	4	1ª Reg.	4th	
1966–67	5	2ª Reg.	6th	
1967–68	5	2ª Reg.	3rd	
1968–69	4	1ª Reg.	4th	
1969–70	4	1ª Reg.	14th	
1970–71	4	1ª Reg.	11th	
1971–72	4	1ª Reg.	10th	
1972–73	4	1ª Reg.	13th	
1973–74	4	1ª Reg.	21st	
1974–75	5	2ª Reg.	4th	
1975–76	6	2ª Reg.	3rd	

Season	Tier	Division	Place	Copa del Rey
1976–77	6	2ª Reg.	6th	
1977–78	7	2ª Reg.	7th	
1978–79	7	2ª Reg.	6th	
1979–80	7	2ª Reg.	5th	
1980–81	6	1ª Reg.	4th	
1981–82	6	1ª Reg.	3rd	
1982–83	6	1ª Reg.	8th	
1983–84	5	Reg. Pref.	19th	
1984–85	5	1ª Reg.	9th	
1985–86	5	1ª Reg.	4th	
1986–87	5	Reg. Pref.	5th	
1987–88	5	Reg. Pref.	2nd	
1988–89	5	Reg. Pref.	4th	
1989–90	5	Reg. Pref.	1st	
1990–91	5	Reg. Pref.	2nd	
1991–92	5	Reg. Pref.	3rd	
1992–93	5	Reg. Pref.	1st	
1993–94	5	Reg. Pref.	1st	
1994–95	4	3ª	4th	
1995–96	4	3ª	3rd	

Season	Tier	Division	Place	Copa del Rey
1996–97	4	3ª	2nd	
1997–98	3	2ª B	9th	Second round
1998–99	3	2ª B	20th	

- 2 seasons in Segunda División B
- 3 seasons in Tercera División
