= Amurrio Club =

Coordinates: 43.05256°N 2.9927°W

Amurrio
- Full name: Amurrio Club
- Founded: 1949
- Ground: Basarte, Amurrio, Basque Country, Spain
- Capacity: 4,000
- President: Xabier Gauna
- Head coach: Iban López
- League: Tercera Federación – Group 4
- 2025–26: División de Honor, 1st of 16 (champions)
- Website: https://amurrioclub.eus/es
Home colours	Away colours

Amurrio Club is a Spanish football team based in Amurrio, in the autonomous community of Basque Country. Founded in 1949, it currently plays in Tercera Federación – Group 4, holding home games at Estadio Basarte, with a 4,000-seater capacity.

It is a partner club of the local professional team Deportivo Alavés.

== Season to season ==
Season	Tier	Division	Place	Copa del Rey
1949–50	6	3ª Reg.	2nd	
1950–51	6	3ª Reg.	2nd	
1951–52	6	3ª Reg.	5th	
1952–53	6	3ª Reg.	7th	
1953–54	6	3ª Reg.	2nd	
1954–55	5	2ª Reg.	6th	
1955–56	5	2ª Reg.	10th	
1956–57	5	2ª Reg.	6th	
1957–58	5	2ª Reg.	9th	
1958–59	5	2ª Reg.	5th	
1959–60	5	2ª Reg.	11th	
1960–61	5	2ª Reg.	14th	
1961–62	5	2ª Reg.	12th	
1962–63	5	2ª Reg.	10th	
1963–64	5	2ª Reg.	15th	
1964–65	5	2ª Reg.	8th	
1965–66	5	2ª Reg.	4th	
1966–67	5	2ª Reg.	2nd	
1967–68	5	2ª Reg.	13th	
1968–69	6	2ª Reg.	8th	

Season	Tier	Division	Place	Copa del Rey
1969–70	6	2ª Reg.	7th	
1970–71	6	2ª Reg.	17th	
1971–72	6	2ª Reg.	11th	
1972–73	6	2ª Reg.	4th	
1973–74	6	2ª Reg.	5th	
1974–75	6	2ª Reg.	8th	
1975–76	6	2ª Reg.	14th	
1976–77	6	2ª Reg.	1st	
1977–78	6	1ª Reg.	12th	
1978–79	6	1ª Reg.	8th	
1979–80	6	1ª Reg.	6th	
1980–81	6	1ª Reg.	5th	
1981–82	6	1ª Reg.	14th	
1982–83	6	1ª Reg.	16th	
1983–84	6	1ª Reg.	10th	
1984–85	6	1ª Reg.	5th	
1985–86	6	1ª Reg.	11th	
1986–87	6	1ª Reg.	5th	
1987–88	6	1ª Reg.	3rd	
1988–89	6	1ª Reg.	8th	

Season	Tier	Division	Place	Copa del Rey
1989–90	6	1ª Reg.	8th	
1990–91	5	Reg. Pref.	4th	
1991–92	5	Reg. Pref.	1st	
1992–93	4	3ª	6th	
1993–94	4	3ª	1st	
1994–95	3	2ª B	11th	
1995–96	3	2ª B	20th	
1996–97	4	3ª	4th	
1997–98	3	2ª B	13th	
1998–99	3	2ª B	7th	
1999–2000	3	2ª B	7th	
2000–01	3	2ª B	4th	
2001–02	3	2ª B	7th	Round of 64
2002–03	3	2ª B	8th	Round of 64
2003–04	3	2ª B	7th	
2004–05	3	2ª B	11th	Round of 64
2005–06	3	2ª B	16th	
2006–07	3	2ª B	20th	
2007–08	4	3ª	3rd	
2008–09	4	3ª	2nd	

Season	Tier	Division	Place	Copa del Rey
2009–10	4	3ª	8th	
2010–11	4	3ª	19th	
2011–12	5	Reg. Pref.	6th	
2012–13	5	Reg. Pref.	1st	
2013–14	4	3ª	16th	
2014–15	4	3ª	20th	
2015–16	5	Reg. Pref.	1st	
2016–17	4	3ª	12th	
2017–18	4	3ª	16th	
2018–19	4	3ª	17th	
2019–20	5	Reg. Pref.	2nd	
2020–21	5	Reg. Pref.	1st	
2021–22	5	3ª RFEF	18th	
2022–23	6	Div. Hon.	7th	
2023–24	6	Div. Hon.	9th	
2024–25	6	Div. Hon.	4th	
2025–26	6	Div. Hon.	1st	
2026–27	5	3ª Fed		

- 12 seasons in Segunda División B
- 12 seasons in Tercera División
- 2 seasons in Tercera Federación/Tercera División RFEF

== Honours ==
- RFEF Basque tournament (4): 1993–94, 2000–01, 2003–04, 2006–07
