= Velarde CF =

Spanish football club

Velarde
- Full name: Velarde Club de Fútbol
- Founded: 1967
- Ground: La Maruca, Muriedas, Camargo, Cantabria, Spain
- Capacity: 2,350
- Chairman: Joaquín Rueda
- Manager: Jose A. Cruz Sánchez
- League: Tercera Federación – Group 3
- 2025–26: Regional Preferente, 4th of 18 (promoted)
| Home colours | Away colours |

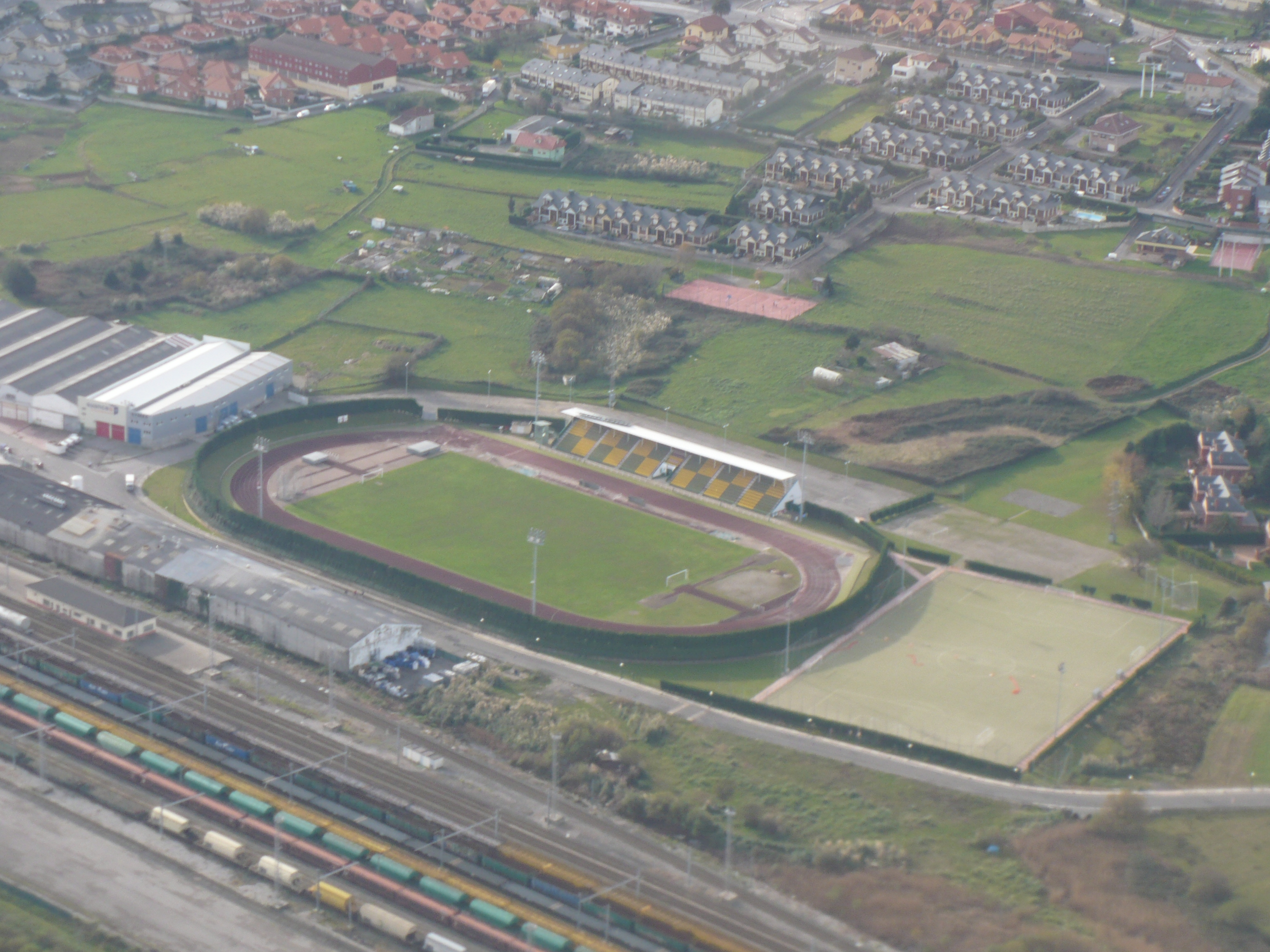
Estadio La Maruca.

Velarde Club de Fútbol is a football team based in Muriedas, Camargo in the autonomous community of Cantabria, Spain. Founded in 1967, the team plays in Tercera Federación – Group 3. The club's home ground is La Maruca, which has a capacity of 2,350 spectators.

== History ==
In the 2015–16 season the club managed to promote to Tercera División by finishing 3rd in the Regional Preferente. In the 2018–19 season the club was relegated from Tercera División to the regional category Preferente Cantabria.

== Season to season ==
| Season | Tier | Division | Place | Copa del Rey |
|---|---|---|---|---|
| 1967–68 | 4 | 1ª Reg. | 9th | |
| 1968–69 | 5 | 2ª Reg. | 2nd | |
| 1969–70 | 4 | 1ª Reg. | 13th | |
| 1970–71 | 5 | 2ª Reg. | 2nd | |
| 1971–72 | 4 | 1ª Reg. | 8th | |
| 1972–73 | 4 | 1ª Reg. | 10th | |
| 1973–74 | 4 | 1ª Reg. | 11th | |
| 1974–75 | 4 | Reg. Pref. | 14th | |
| 1975–76 | 4 | Reg. Pref. | 12th | |
| 1976–77 | 4 | Reg. Pref. | 7th | |
| 1977–78 | 5 | Reg. Pref. | 5th | |
| 1978–79 | 5 | Reg. Pref. | 5th | |
| 1979–80 | 5 | Reg. Pref. | 8th | |
| 1980–81 | 5 | Reg. Pref. | 12th | |
| 1981–82 | 5 | Reg. Pref. | 8th | |
| 1982–83 | 5 | Reg. Pref. | 11th | |
| 1983–84 | 5 | Reg. Pref. | 2nd | |
| 1984–85 | 5 | Reg. Pref. | 5th | |
| 1985–86 | 5 | Reg. Pref. | 18th | |
| 1986–87 | 5 | Reg. Pref. | 16th | |

| Season | Tier | Division | Place | Copa del Rey |
|---|---|---|---|---|
| 1987–88 | 5 | Reg. Pref. | 3rd | |
| 1988–89 | 4 | 3ª | 18th | |
| 1989–90 | 5 | Reg. Pref. | 7th | |
| 1990–91 | 5 | Reg. Pref. | 10th | |
| 1991–92 | 5 | Reg. Pref. | 2nd | |
| 1992–93 | 5 | Reg. Pref. | 1st | |
| 1993–94 | 4 | 3ª | 15th | |
| 1994–95 | 4 | 3ª | 13th | |
| 1995–96 | 4 | 3ª | 8th | |
| 1996–97 | 4 | 3ª | 4th | |
| 1997–98 | 4 | 3ª | 12th | |
| 1998–99 | 4 | 3ª | 13th | |
| 1999–2000 | 4 | 3ª | 14th | |
| 2000–01 | 4 | 3ª | 7th | |
| 2001–02 | 4 | 3ª | 6th | |
| 2002–03 | 4 | 3ª | 1st | |
| 2003–04 | 4 | 3ª | 4th | First round |
| 2004–05 | 4 | 3ª | 7th | |
| 2005–06 | 4 | 3ª | 6th | |
| 2006–07 | 4 | 3ª | 10th | |

| Season | Tier | Division | Place | Copa del Rey |
|---|---|---|---|---|
| 2007–08 | 4 | 3ª | 5th | |
| 2008–09 | 4 | 3ª | 20th | |
| 2009–10 | 5 | Reg. Pref. | 14th | |
| 2010–11 | 5 | Reg. Pref. | 14th | |
| 2011–12 | 5 | Reg. Pref. | 13th | |
| 2013–14 | 5 | Reg. Pref. | 5th | |
| 2014–15 | 5 | Reg. Pref. | 6th | |
| 2015–16 | 5 | Reg. Pref. | 3rd | |
| 2016–17 | 4 | 3ª | 10th | |
| 2017–18 | 4 | 3ª | 14th | |
| 2018–19 | 4 | 3ª | 18th | |
| 2019–20 | 5 | Reg. Pref. | 8th | |
| 2020–21 | 5 | Reg. Pref. | 3rd | |
| 2021–22 | 6 | Reg. Pref. | 4th | |
| 2022–23 | 6 | Reg. Pref. | 2nd | First round |
| 2023–24 | 5 | 3ª Fed. | 18th | |
| 2024–25 | 6 | Reg. Pref. | 6th | |
| 2025–26 | 6 | Reg. Pref. | 4th | |
| 2026–27 | 5 | 3ª Fed. | | |

- 20 seasons in Tercera División
- 2 seasons in Tercera Federación
