= Úbeda CF =

Úbeda
- Full name: Úbeda Club de Fútbol
- Founded: 1923; 1972 (refounded)
- Dissolved: 2006
- Ground: San Miguel; Úbeda, Jaén, Andalusia, Spain
- Capacity: 6,000
- 2006–07: 1ª Andaluza – Group 3, 16th of 16
Home colours	Away colours	Third colours

Úbeda Club de Fútbol was a Spanish football team based in Úbeda, Jaén, in the autonomous community of Andalusia. Founded in 1923 and dissolved in 2006, they played in the Tercera División for 33 seasons, and held home matches at Campo de Fútbol de San Miguel, with a capacity of 6,000 people.

== History ==
Founded in 1923 as Úbeda Football Club, the club changed name in 1941 to Úbeda Club de Fútbol due to the determinations of the government after the Spanish Civil War. They first reached the Tercera División in 1952, playing in the category for seven consecutive seasons before suffering relegation and subsequently folding in 1959.

Úbeda only returned to an active status in 1972, and achieved promotion to the third division in 1977. Until 2006, the club only played three of the 30 seasons in the Regional Preferente, being a long-standing member of the Tercera División.

Under severe economic problems at the time of their relegation in 2006, Úbeda withdrew from the 2006–07 Primera Andaluza, disappearing afterwards. Other clubs were founded in the city, such as CD Úbeda Viva and UD Úbeda CF, with the goal of reviving Úbeda CF's history. The latter folded in March 2020, after less than two years of existence.

== Season to season ==
Season	Tier	Division	Place	Copa del Rey
1929–1950	—	Regional	—	
1950–51	4	1ª Reg.	1st	
1951–52	4	1ª Reg.	1st	
1952–53	3	3ª	14th	
1953–54	3	3ª	19th	
1954–55	3	3ª	1st	
1955–56	3	3ª	3rd	
1956–57	3	3ª	3rd	
1957–58	3	3ª	8th	
1958–59	3	3ª	15th	
1959–1972	DNP			
1972–73	5	2ª Reg.		
1973–74	5	2ª Reg.		
1974–75	5	2ª Reg.	2nd	
1975–76	4	Reg. Pref.	12th	
1976–77	4	Reg. Pref.	8th	
1977–78	4	3ª	5th	First round
1978–79	4	3ª	8th	First round
1979–80	4	3ª	3rd	First round
1980–81	4	3ª	6th	First round

Season	Tier	Division	Place	Copa del Rey
1981–82	4	3ª	13th	First round
1982–83	4	3ª	17th	
1983–84	4	3ª	16th	
1984–85	4	3ª	20th	
1985–86	5	Reg. Pref.	1st	
1986–87	4	3ª	14th	
1987–88	4	3ª	5th	
1988–89	4	3ª	9th	
1989–90	4	3ª	12th	
1990–91	4	3ª	11th	
1991–92	4	3ª	14th	
1992–93	4	3ª	14th	
1993–94	4	3ª	19th	
1994–95	5	Reg. Pref.	9th	
1995–96	5	Reg. Pref.	2nd	
1996–97	4	3ª	4th	
1997–98	4	3ª	13th	
1998–99	4	3ª	16th	
1999–2000	4	3ª	15th	
2000–01	4	3ª	13th	

Season	Tier	Division	Place	Copa del Rey
2001–02	4	3ª	10th	
2002–03	4	3ª	17th	
2003–04	4	3ª	12th	
2004–05	4	3ª	13th	
2005–06	4	3ª	19th	
2006–07	5	1ª And.	(R)	

- 33 seasons in Tercera División
