= CF Sóller =

Spanish association football club

Sóller
- Full name: Club de Fútbol Sóller
- Nickname: Sóller
- Founded: 9 August 1954; 72 years ago
- Ground: Camp d'en Maiol, Sóller; Balearic Islands, Spain
- Capacity: 1,500
- President: Miquel Bestard Pérez
- Head coach: Álex López Boule
- League: División de Honor – Mallorca
- 2025–26: División de Honor – Mallorca, 8th of 18
- Website: http://www.facebook.com/cf.soller
Home colours	Away colours	Third colours

Club de Fútbol Sóller (in English, Sóller Football Club) is a Spanish football team based in Sóller, Majorca, in the autonomous community of the Balearic Islands. Founded on 1954, it currently plays in División de Honor – Mallorca, holding home matches at the Camp d'en Maiol, with a capacity of 1,500 people.

== History ==
Founded in 1954, CF Sóller played in regional categories since his foundation. The best seasons were the 80's and 90's, when the club reached Tercera División.

In 1997, the club reached the Segunda División B, but was immediately relegated to the fourth division and subsequently suffered an administrative relegation to the Primera Regional Preferente. The club returned to the fourth tier in 2000, being relegated back in 2002 but achieving immediate promotion.

From 2007 to 2012, Sóller played in the Preferente again until 2012, when they promoted to the fourth tier. Relegated back in 2013, the club played three consecutive seasons in Tercera before again suffering relegation. They returned to the fourth division in 2018.

=== Club's background ===
- Marià Sportiu – (1923–26)
- Sóller Foot-Ball – (1926–35)
- CD Sóller – (1935–49)
- UD Atlético de Sóller – (1949–51)
- Águilas Sóller – (1952–54)

== Season to season ==
Season	Tier	Division	Place	Copa del Rey
1954–55	4	1ª Reg.	5th	
1955–56	4	1ª Reg.	2nd	
1956–57	3	3ª	14th	
1957–58	3	3ª	14th	
1958–59	3	3ª	12th	
1959–60	3	3ª	6th	
1960–61	3	3ª	15th	
1961–62	4	1ª Reg.	2nd	
1962–63	5	2ª Reg.	1st	
1963–64	5	2ª Reg.		
1964–65	4	1ª Reg.	4th	
1965–66	4	1ª Reg.	4th	
1966–67	4	1ª Reg.	10th	
1967–68	5	2ª Reg.	2nd	
1968–69	5	2ª Reg.	4th	
1969–70	5	2ª Reg.	3rd	
1970–71	5	2ª Reg.	1st	
1971–72	4	1ª Reg.	5th	
1972–73	4	Reg. Pref.	18th	
1973–74	5	1ª Reg.	10th	

Season	Tier	Division	Place	Copa del Rey
1974–75	5	1ª Reg.	2nd	
1975–76	4	Reg. Pref.	13th	
1976–77	4	Reg. Pref.	8th	
1977–78	5	Reg. Pref.	3rd	
1978–79	5	Reg. Pref.	2nd	
1979–80	4	3ª	14th	
1980–81	4	3ª	11th	
1981–82	4	3ª	20th	
1982–83	5	Reg. Pref.	18th	
1983–84	6	1ª Reg.	1st	
1984–85	5	Reg. Pref.	2nd	
1985–86	4	3ª	13th	
1986–87	4	3ª	19th	
1987–88	4	3ª	9th	
1988–89	4	3ª	14th	
1989–90	4	3ª	16th	
1990–91	4	3ª	11th	
1991–92	4	3ª	8th	
1992–93	4	3ª	10th	
1993–94	4	3ª	7th	

Season	Tier	Division	Place	Copa del Rey
1994–95	4	3ª	3rd	
1995–96	4	3ª	1st	
1996–97	4	3ª	3rd	
1997–98	3	2ª B	19th	
1998–99	5	Reg. Pref.	12th	
1999–2000	5	Reg. Pref.	1st	
2000–01	4	3ª	16th	
2001–02	4	3ª	18th	
2002–03	5	Reg. Pref.	1st	
2003–04	4	3ª	8th	
2004–05	4	3ª	14th	
2005–06	4	3ª	15th	
2006–07	4	3ª	20th	
2007–08	5	Reg. Pref.	7th	
2008–09	5	Reg. Pref.	7th	
2009–10	5	Reg. Pref.	13th	
2010–11	5	Reg. Pref.	16th	
2011–12	5	Reg. Pref.	1st	
2012–13	4	3ª	19th	
2013–14	5	Reg. Pref.	1st	

Season	Tier	Division	Place	Copa del Rey
2014–15	4	3ª	8th	
2015–16	4	3ª	19th	
2016–17	5	Reg. Pref.	17th	
2017–18	5	Reg. Pref.	1st	
2018–19	4	3ª	14th	
2019–20	4	3ª	12th	
2020–21	4	3ª	7th / 1st	
2021–22	5	3ª RFEF	11th	
2022–23	5	3ª Fed.	15th	
2023–24	5	3ª Fed.	17th	
2024–25	6	Div. Hon.	5th	
2025–26	6	Div. Hon.	8th	
2026–27	6	Div. Hon.		

- 1 season in Segunda División B
- 32 seasons in Tercera División
- 3 seasons in Tercera Federación/Tercera División RFEF
- 36 seasons in Categorías Regionales

== Current squad ==
Note: Flags indicate national team as defined under FIFA eligibility rules; some limited exceptions apply. Players may hold more than one non-FIFA nationality.

No.	Pos.	Nation	Player
1	GK	ESP	Andrés Palacios
2	MF	ESP	Dani M. Polvorosa
3	DF	ESP	Miquel Ramon
4	MF	ESP	Gaspar Alemany
5	DF	ESP	Miquel A. Campins
6	DF	ESP	Marcos Mayol
7	MF	ESP	Joan Capó
8	FW	ESP	Ramiro Vicente
9	FW	ESP	Marc Tovar
10	FW	ESP	Tomeu Reynés (captain)
11	FW	URU	Leonel A. Martínez

No.	Pos.	Nation	Player
12	DF	ESP	Ianis Ballester
12	DF	ESP	Juan M. Sundin
13	GK	ESP	Alfredo Olivares
14	MF	ESP	Rubén Martínez
14	MF	ESP	Quico Lladó
15	MF	ESP	Lluís Marqués
16	FW	ESP	Lluís Quirós
16	FW	ESP	Jandro Sánchez
16	FW	ESP	Antoni Lluís Adrover Colom
25	GK	ESP	Pere J. Palou
--	GK	ESP	José A. Vicho

=== Technical staff ===
- Head coach: (Spain) Álex López Boule
- Assistant coach: (Spain) Daniel García
- Fitness coach: (Spain) Jaume Segura
- Physiotherapist: (Spain) Lluís Bernat

== Honours ==
- Tercera División: 1995–96
- Categorías Regionales: 1962–63, 1970–71, 1983–84, 1999–2000, 2002–03, 2011–12, 2013–14, 2017–18
- Baleares Championship: 1946–47
- Copa Uruguay: 1961

== Famous players ==
- (Spain) Ángel Pedraza

== Stadium ==
Sóller hold home games at Camp d'en Maiol, with a 1,500-spectators capacity. It opened on 24 August 1923. 500 seats are located on a covered tribune, and the pitch's dimensions are 98×61 metres.
