= Lorca CF =

- Full name: Lorca Club de Fútbol
- Founded: 1994
- Dissolved: 2002
- Ground: San José; Lorca, Murcia, Spain
- Capacity: 8,000
Home colours

Lorca Club de Fútbol was a Spanish football team based in Lorca, in the autonomous community of the Region of Murcia. Founded in 1994, it was dissolved in 2002, and held home games at Estadio Municipal de San José, with an 8,000-seat capacity.

== History ==
Founded in 1994 as a merger of Club de Fútbol Lorca Deportiva, Lorca Promesas CF and UD Lorca, the club started his first season achieving promotion from Tercera División. It subsequently fluctuated between the fourth division and Segunda División B in the following seasons, but folded in 2002.

== Season to season ==
Season	Tier	Division	Place	Copa del Rey
1994–95	4	3ª	1st	
1995–96	3	2ª B	19th	
1996–97	4	3ª	2nd	
1997–98	3	2ª B	17th	Third round
1998–99	4	3ª	2nd	
1999–2000	3	2ª B	20th	Second round
2000–01	4	3ª	4th	
2001–02	4	3ª	4th	

- 3 seasons in Segunda División B
- 5 seasons in Tercera División
