= Trofeo Emma Cuervo =

Spanish football tournament

The Trofeo Emma Cuervo is an annual football tournament held in Ribadeo, Lugo, Spain, held every year since 1952. It is organised by Ribadeo FC.

== History ==
Year	Champion	Result	Runner-up
1952	(Spain) Racing Club de Ferrol	4-1	(Spain) Caudal Deportivo
1953	(Spain) Real Oviedo	2-1	(Spain) Celta de Vigo
1954	(Spain) Celta de Vigo	3-1	(Spain) Athletic Club
1955	(Spain) Deportivo de La Coruña	2-1	(Spain) Real Oviedo
1956	(Spain) Real Valladolid	3-2	(Spain) Sevilla
1957	(Spain) Sporting de Gijón	3-1	(Spain) Celta de Vigo
1958	(Spain) Real Oviedo	2-0	(Spain) Celta de Vigo
1959	(Spain) Real Zaragoza	3-0	(Spain) Real Oviedo
1960	(Spain) Sporting de Gijón	3-1	(Spain) Ourense
1961	(Spain) Celta de Vigo	4-2	(Spain) Villarreal
1962	(Spain) Deportivo de La Coruña	2-1	(Spain) Real Oviedo
1963	(Spain) Sporting de Gijón	1-1 (5-0 p.)	(Spain) Pontevedra
1964	(Spain) Deportivo de La Coruña	2-1	(Spain) Real Oviedo
1965	(Spain) Real Oviedo	3-2	(Spain) Celta de Vigo
1966	(Spain) Real Oviedo	1-0	(Spain) Deportivo de La Coruña
1967	(Spain) Sporting de Gijón	6-0	(Spain) Celta de Vigo
1968	(Spain) Celta de Vigo	2-0	(Spain) Real Oviedo
1969	(Spain) Real Oviedo	3-0	(Spain) Racing Club de Ferrol
1970	(Spain) Pontevedra	2-0	(Spain) Real Oviedo
1971	(Spain) Racing Club de Ferrol	2-0	(Spain) Real Oviedo
1972	(Spain) Sporting de Gijón	1-0	(Spain) Deportivo de La Coruña
1973	(Spain) Real Oviedo	5-1	(Spain) Deportivo de La Coruña
1974	(Spain) Racing de Santander	1-0	(Spain) Real Oviedo
1975	(Spain) Celta de Vigo	2-0	(Spain) Sporting de Gijón
1976	(Spain) Salamanca	2-0	(Portugal) Belenenses
1977	(Spain) Celta de Vigo	1-0 (4-3 p.)	(Spain) Real Oviedo
1978	(Spain) Real Oviedo	0-0 (4-3 p.)	(Spain) Lugo
1979	(Spain) Celta de Vigo	0-0 (4-2 p.)	(Spain) Real Oviedo
1980	(Spain) Racing Club de Ferrol	1-0	(Spain) Real Oviedo
1981	(Spain) Celta de Vigo	3-1	(Spain) Real Oviedo
1982	(Spain) Ribadeo	1-1 (6-5 p.)	(Spain) Real Oviedo B
1983	(Spain) Deportivo de La Coruña	0-0 (4-2 p.)	(Spain) Real Oviedo
1984	(Spain) Deportivo de La Coruña	1-0	(Spain) Real Oviedo
1985	(Spain) Real Betis	0-0 (15-14 p.)	(Spain) Deportivo de La Coruña
1986	(Spain) Real Oviedo	0-0 (5-3 p.)	(Spain) Cádiz
1987	(Spain) Lugo	0-0 (3-1 p.)	(Spain) Deportivo de La Coruña
1988	(Spain) Real Oviedo	0-0 (4-3 p.)	(Spain) Celta de Vigo
1989	(Spain) Real Oviedo	3-2	(Spain) Celta de Vigo
1990	(Spain) Deportivo de La Coruña	1-1 (3-1 p.)	(Spain) Real Oviedo
1991	(Spain) Deportivo de La Coruña	0-0 (3-0 p.)	(Spain) Real Oviedo
1992	(Spain) Real Oviedo	3-0	(Spain) Compostela
1993	(Spain) Mérida	4-2	(Spain) Real Oviedo
1994	(Spain) Deportivo de La Coruña	1-0	(Spain) Real Oviedo
1995	(Spain) SD Compostela	1-0	(Spain) Sporting de Gijón
1996	(Spain) Real Oviedo	2-0	(Spain) Compostela
1997	(Spain) Celta de Vigo	3-0	(Spain) Sporting de Gijón
1998	(Spain) Racing de Santander	1-0	(Spain) Compostela
1999	(Spain) Deportivo de La Coruña	3-0	(Spain) Real Oviedo
2000	(Spain) Racing Club de Ferrol	2-0	(Spain) Deportivo de La Coruña
2001	(Spain) Real Oviedo	3-1	(Spain) Racing Club de Ferrol
2002	(Spain) Racing Club de Ferrol	1-1 (5-3 p.)	(Spain) Salamanca
2003	(Spain) Athletic Club	2-1	(Spain) Celta de Vigo
2004	(Spain) Real Oviedo	4-1	(Spain) Atlético Arteixo
2005	(Spain) Racing Club de Ferrol	2-0	(Spain) Real Oviedo
2006	(Spain) Universidad de Oviedo	1-1	(Spain) Celta Vigo B
2007	(Spain) Sporting de Gijón	2-0	(Spain) Racing Club de Ferrol
2008	(Spain) Sporting Gijón B	3-2	(Spain) Racing Club de Ferrol
2009	(Spain) Racing Club de Ferrol	2-1	(Spain) Lugo
2010	(Spain) Celta de Vigo	2-0	(Spain) Real Oviedo
2011	(Spain) Real Oviedo	1-0	(Spain) Lugo
2012	(Spain) Sporting de Gijón	4-1	(Spain) Deportivo de La Coruña
2013	(Spain) Lugo	2-1	(Spain) Sporting de Gijón
2014	(Spain) Lugo	2-2 (4-1 p.)	(Spain) Sporting de Gijón
2015	(Spain) Lugo	1-0	(Spain) Deportivo de La Coruña
2016	(Spain) Deportivo de La Coruña	2-0	(Spain) Real Oviedo
2017	(Spain) Real Oviedo	1-0	(Spain) Lugo
2018	(Spain) UP Langreo	0-0 (4-2 p.)	(Spain) SD Compostela
2019	(Spain) SD Ponferradina	1-0	(Spain) Real Oviedo

== Winners ==
Team	Winners	Runners-up
(Spain) Real Oviedo	16	23
(Spain) Deportivo La Coruña	10	8
(Spain) Celta Vigo	9	8
(Spain) Ferrol	7	4
(Spain) Sporting Gijón	7	5
(Spain) CD Lugo	4	4
(Spain) Racing Santander	2	-
(Spain) SD Compostela	1	4
(Spain) Athletic Bilbao	1	1
(Spain) Pontevedra CF	1	1
(Spain) UD Salamanca	1	1
(Spain) Mérida	1	-
(Spain) Universidad de Oviedo	1	-
(Spain) Real Valladolid	1	-
(Spain) Real Zaragoza	1	-
(Spain) Ribadeo	1	-
(Spain) Real Betis	1	-
(Spain) Sporting Gijón B	1	-
(Spain) UP Langreo	1	-
(Spain) Ponferradina	1	-
