= Moralo CP =

Association football club in Spain

Moralo
- Full name: Moralo Club Polideportivo
- Founded: 1965
- Ground: Municipal, Navalmoral de la Mata, Extremadura, Spain
- Capacity: 4,000
- President: (Spain) Francisco Cuevas del Monte
- Head coach: (Spain) José Diego Pastelero
- League: Tercera Federación – Group 14
- 2025–26: Tercera Federación – Group 14, 3rd of 18
| Home colours | Away colours |

Moralo Club Polideportivo is a football team based in Navalmoral de la Mata in the autonomous community of Extremadura. Founded in 1965, it plays in the Tercera Federación – Group 14. Its stadium is Municipal de Navalmoral with a capacity of 4,000 seats.

== Season to season ==
| Season | Tier | Division | Place | Copa del Rey |
|---|---|---|---|---|
| 1965–66 | 4 | 1ª Reg. | 7th | |
| 1966–67 | 5 | 2ª Reg. | | |
| 1967–68 | 4 | 1ª Reg. | 4th | |
| 1968–69 | 4 | 1ª Reg. | 12th | |
| 1969–70 | 4 | 1ª Reg. | 12th | |
| 1970–71 | 4 | 1ª Reg. | 12th | |
| 1971–72 | 4 | 1ª Reg. | 12th | |
| 1972–73 | 4 | 1ª Reg. | 15th | |
| 1973–74 | 4 | 1ª Reg. | 10th | |
| 1974–75 | 4 | Reg. Pref. | 14th | |
| 1975–76 | 4 | Reg. Pref. | 7th | |
| 1976–77 | 4 | Reg. Pref. | 10th | |
| 1977–78 | 5 | Reg. Pref. | 10th | |
| 1978–79 | 5 | Reg. Pref. | 11th | |
| 1979–80 | 5 | Reg. Pref. | 1st | |
| 1980–81 | 4 | 3ª | 9th | |
| 1981–82 | 4 | 3ª | 15th | |
| 1982–83 | 4 | 3ª | 18th | |
| 1983–84 | 4 | 3ª | 7th | |
| 1984–85 | 4 | 3ª | 8th | |

| Season | Tier | Division | Place | Copa del Rey |
|---|---|---|---|---|
| 1985–86 | 4 | 3ª | 6th | |
| 1986–87 | 4 | 3ª | 6th | |
| 1987–88 | 4 | 3ª | 4th | |
| 1988–89 | 4 | 3ª | 9th | |
| 1989–90 | 4 | 3ª | 11th | |
| 1990–91 | 4 | 3ª | 10th | |
| 1991–92 | 4 | 3ª | 3rd | |
| 1992–93 | 4 | 3ª | 1st | |
| 1993–94 | 4 | 3ª | 5th | |
| 1994–95 | 4 | 3ª | 6th | |
| 1995–96 | 4 | 3ª | 3rd | |
| 1996–97 | 4 | 3ª | 2nd | |
| 1997–98 | 3 | 2ª B | 14th | |
| 1998–99 | 3 | 2ª B | 19th | |
| 1999–2000 | 4 | 3ª | 11th | |
| 2000–01 | 4 | 3ª | 5th | |
| 2001–02 | 4 | 3ª | 3rd | |
| 2002–03 | 3 | 2ª B | 18th | |
| 2003–04 | 4 | 3ª | 12th | |
| 2004–05 | 4 | 3ª | 4th | |

| Season | Tier | Division | Place | Copa del Rey |
|---|---|---|---|---|
| 2005–06 | 4 | 3ª | 14th | |
| 2006–07 | 4 | 3ª | 12th | |
| 2007–08 | 4 | 3ª | 10th | |
| 2008–09 | 4 | 3ª | 7th | |
| 2009–10 | 4 | 3ª | 14th | |
| 2010–11 | 4 | 3ª | 8th | |
| 2011–12 | 4 | 3ª | 16th | |
| 2012–13 | 4 | 3ª | 18th | |
| 2013–14 | 5 | Reg. Pref. | 2nd | |
| 2014–15 | 4 | 3ª | 6th | |
| 2015–16 | 4 | 3ª | 12th | |
| 2016–17 | 4 | 3ª | 9th | |
| 2017–18 | 4 | 3ª | 5th | |
| 2018–19 | 4 | 3ª | 3rd | |
| 2019–20 | 4 | 3ª | 5th | |
| 2020–21 | 4 | 3ª | 3rd / 4th | |
| 2021–22 | 5 | 3ª RFEF | 2nd | |
| 2022–23 | 5 | 3ª Fed. | 3rd | |
| 2023–24 | 5 | 3ª Fed. | 5th | |
| 2024–25 | 5 | 3ª Fed. | 10th | |

| Season | Tier | Division | Place | Copa del Rey |
|---|---|---|---|---|
| 2025–26 | 5 | 3ª Fed. | 3rd | |
| 2026–27 | 5 | 3ª Fed. | | |

- 3 seasons in Segunda División B
- 37 seasons in Tercera División
- 6 seasons in Tercera Federación/Tercera División RFEF

== Famous players ==
- (Equatorial Guinea) Raúl Fabiani
- (Nigeria) Christantus Uche
- (Spain) José Luis Garzón

== Famous coaches ==
- (Spain) Joaquín Caparrós
