= Jumilla CF =

Jumilla
- Full name: Jumilla Club de Fútbol
- Founded: 1941; 1975 (refounded)
- Dissolved: 2011
- Ground: La Hoya, Jumilla, Murcia, Spain
- Capacity: 3,000
- 2010–11: 2ªB – Group 4, 20th
Home colours	Away colours

Jumilla Club de Fútbol was a Spanish football team based in Jumilla, Region of Murcia. Founded in 1941, refounded 1975 and dissolved in 2011, it held home games at Estadio Municipal de La Hoya, with a 3,000-seat capacity.

== History ==
Jumilla was refounded in 1975. On 27 May 2011, immediately after having finished its only season in Segunda División B - after 24 years in Tercera División, 20 consecutive - the club was dissolved due to an overall debt of €370,000.

== Season to season ==
Season	Tier	Division	Place	Copa del Rey
1942–43	4	2ª Reg.	2nd	
1943–44	4	1ª Reg.	1st	
1944–45	4	1ª Reg.	3rd	
1945–1949	DNP			
1949–50	4	1ª Reg.	5th	
1950–51	4	1ª Reg.	8th	
1951–52	5	2ª Reg.	5th	
1952–53	4	1ª Reg.	8th	
1953–54	4	1ª Reg.	4th	
1954–55	4	1ª Reg.	6th	
1955–56	DNP			
1956–57	DNP			

Season	Tier	Division	Place	Copa del Rey
1957–58	5	2ª Reg.	5th	
1958–59	4	1ª Reg.	14th	
1959–60	4	1ª Reg.	5th	
1960–61	4	1ª Reg.	3rd	
1961–62	4	1ª Reg.	1st	
1962–63	3	3ª	3rd	
1963–64	3	3ª	3rd	
1964–65	3	3ª	6th	
1965–66	3	3ª	8th	
1966–67	3	3ª	15th	
1967–68	4	1ª Reg.	16th	

- 5 seasons in Tercera División

=== Team refounded ===
Season	Tier	Division	Place	Copa del Rey
1976–77	6	2ª Reg.	1st	
1977–78	6	1ª Reg.	11th	
1978–79	6	1ª Reg.	6th	
1979–80	6	1ª Reg.	1st	
1980–81	5	Reg. Pref.	3rd	
1981–82	4	3ª	18th	
1982–83	4	3ª	10th	
1983–84	4	3ª	11th	
1984–85	4	3ª	19th	
1985–86	5	Reg. Pref.	4th	
1986–87	5	Reg. Pref.	9th	
1987–88	5	Reg. Pref.	5th	
1988–89	5	Reg. Pref.	8th	
1989–90	5	Reg. Pref.	2nd	
1990–91	4	3ª	13th	
1991–92	4	3ª	9th	
1992–93	4	3ª	17th	
1993–94	4	3ª	7th	

Season	Tier	Division	Place	Copa del Rey
1994–95	4	3ª	3rd	
1995–96	4	3ª	14th	
1996–97	4	3ª	3rd	
1997–98	4	3ª	13th	
1998–99	4	3ª	10th	
1999–2000	4	3ª	5th	
2000–01	4	3ª	13th	
2001–02	4	3ª	12th	
2002–03	4	3ª	9th	
2003–04	4	3ª	11th	
2004–05	4	3ª	11th	
2005–06	4	3ª	7th	
2006–07	4	3ª	16th	
2007–08	4	3ª	14th	
2008–09	4	3ª	8th	
2009–10	4	3ª	1st	
2010–11	3	2ª B	20th	First round

- 1 season in Segunda División B
- 24 seasons in Tercera División
