= 1996–97 Tercera División =

Tercera División
- Season: 1996–97

The 1996–97 Tercera División season is the 20th season since establishment the tier four.

== League table ==
=== Group 1 ===
Pos	Team	Pld	W	D	L	GF	GA	GD	Pts	Qualification or relegation
1	Vista Alegre SD	38	24	10	4	79	31	+48	82	Promotion play-offs
2	Puente Ourense CF	38	23	8	7	84	37	+47	77	Promotion play-offs
3	CD Lalín	38	21	9	8	64	29	+35	72	Promotion play-offs
4	Viveiro CF	38	21	6	11	58	47	+11	69	Promotion play-offs
5	Betanzos CF	38	17	13	8	47	34	+13	64	
6	CCD Cerceda	38	17	10	11	52	36	+16	61	
7	Gran Peña FC	38	16	12	10	51	40	+11	60	
8	Villalonga FC	38	16	9	13	54	43	+11	57	
9	Caselas FC	38	16	6	16	45	53	−8	54	
10	Club Lemos	38	15	6	17	46	54	−8	51	
11	Porriño Industrial FC	38	14	9	15	48	48	0	51	
12	UD Somozas	38	12	11	15	35	39	−4	47	
13	Gondomar CF	38	12	10	16	45	56	−11	46	
14	Arosa SC	38	11	10	17	56	61	−5	43	
15	UD Xove Lago	38	11	9	18	40	50	−10	42	
16	Juventud Cambados	38	11	9	18	43	61	−18	42	
17	CD Estradense	38	9	10	19	33	56	−23	37	
18	CD Mosteiro (R)	38	9	7	22	30	58	−28	34	Relegation
19	Mindoniense CF (R)	38	7	11	20	28	64	−36	32	Relegation
20	Ribadeo FC (R)	38	6	9	23	35	76	−41	27	Relegation

Source: Fútbol Regional
(R) Relegated

=== Group 2 ===
Pos	Team	Pld	W	D	L	GF	GA	GD	Pts	Qualification or relegation
1	Club Siero	38	21	12	5	64	30	+34	75	Promotion play-offs
2	Navia CF	38	22	9	7	59	27	+32	75	Promotion play-offs
3	Caudal Deportivo	38	21	10	7	68	38	+30	73	Promotion play-offs
4	CD Lealtad	38	18	13	7	61	32	+29	67	Promotion play-offs
5	CD San Martín	38	18	9	11	59	46	+13	63	
6	AD Universidad de Oviedo	38	17	11	10	67	44	+23	62	
7	Pumarín CF	38	17	10	11	40	43	−3	61	
8	CD Turón	38	15	10	13	52	55	−3	55	
9	Navarro CF	38	15	10	13	56	50	+6	55	
10	Real Titánico	38	11	14	13	55	42	+13	47	
11	Ribadesella CF	38	12	11	15	50	55	−5	47	
12	Club Hispano de Castrillón	38	12	8	18	36	49	−13	44	
13	UD Gijón Industrial	38	11	10	17	44	56	−12	43	
14	CD Tuilla	38	10	12	16	39	50	−11	42	
15	Candás CF	38	8	17	13	43	54	−11	41	
16	SD Colloto	38	9	13	16	52	66	−14	40	
17	SD Narcea	38	9	12	17	41	71	−30	39	
18	Santiago de Aller CF (R)	38	10	8	20	50	69	−19	38	Relegation
19	CD Mosconia (R)	38	8	9	21	38	51	−13	33	Relegation
20	Club Astur (R)	38	5	14	19	23	69	−46	29	Relegation

Source: Fútbol Regional
(R) Relegated

=== Group 3 ===
Pos	Team	Pld	W	D	L	GF	GA	GD	Pts	Qualification or relegation
1	CD Tropezón	38	23	12	3	58	24	+34	81	Promotion play-offs
2	Racing de Santander B	38	20	12	6	81	36	+45	72	Promotion play-offs
3	CD Bezana	38	17	15	6	48	28	+20	66	Promotion play-offs
4	Velarde CF	38	17	14	7	68	41	+27	65	Promotion play-offs
5	Ribamontán al Mar CF	38	17	10	11	53	44	+9	61	
6	CD Comillas	38	16	12	10	57	45	+12	60	
7	SD Noja	38	14	15	9	54	28	+26	57	
8	SD Barreda Balompié	38	13	14	11	60	51	+9	53	
9	CD Naval	38	14	10	14	50	44	+6	52	
10	Castro FC	38	12	14	12	40	40	0	50	
11	CD Cayón	38	13	10	15	52	54	−2	49	
12	CD Laredo	38	11	16	11	45	39	+6	49	
13	SD Revilla	38	10	14	14	33	50	−17	44	
14	Santoña CF	38	10	14	14	40	61	−21	44	
15	UM Escobedo	38	11	11	16	37	51	−14	44	
16	CD Guarnizo	38	10	9	19	38	54	−16	39	
17	SD Unión Club	38	9	11	18	43	61	−18	38	
18	Ayrón Club (R)	38	8	14	16	30	51	−21	38	Relegation
19	SD Textil Escudo (R)	38	7	10	21	33	64	−31	31	Relegation
20	Atlético España Cueto (R)	38	4	11	23	20	74	−54	23	Relegation

Source: Fútbol Regional
(R) Relegated

=== Group 4 ===
Pos	Team	Pld	W	D	L	GF	GA	GD	Pts	Qualification or relegation
1	CD Touring	38	20	12	6	48	26	+22	72	Promotion play-offs
2	CD Elgoibar	38	21	7	10	66	32	+34	70	Promotion play-offs
3	Deportivo Alavés B	38	19	8	11	60	33	+27	65	Promotion play-offs
4	Amurrio Club	38	18	10	10	47	40	+7	64	Promotion play-offs
5	SCD Durango	38	17	11	10	50	31	+19	62	
6	CD Aurrerá Ondarroa	38	17	10	11	60	49	+11	61	
7	Tolosa CF	38	17	8	13	39	35	+4	59	
8	CD Lagun Onak	38	16	10	12	53	48	+5	58	
9	CD Santurtzi	38	13	17	8	37	29	+8	56	
10	CD Basconia	38	14	12	12	44	37	+7	54	
11	SD San Pedro	38	14	10	14	45	37	+8	52	
12	CD Getxo	38	13	13	12	51	44	+7	52	
13	SD Amorebieta	38	12	13	13	47	55	−8	49	
14	CD Arratia	38	12	10	16	40	48	−8	46	
15	Zorroza CF	38	12	10	16	40	54	−14	46	
16	CD Hernani	38	11	12	15	37	42	−5	45	
17	SD Urola KE (R)	38	11	6	21	47	67	−20	39	Relegation
18	Aloña Mendi KE (R)	38	9	9	20	42	62	−20	36	Relegation
19	Balmaseda CF (R)	38	6	12	20	31	68	−37	30	Relegation
20	SD Llodio (R)	38	4	8	26	30	77	−47	20	Relegation

Source: Fútbol Regional
(R) Relegated

=== Group 5 ===
Pos	Team	Pld	W	D	L	GF	GA	GD	Pts	Qualification or relegation
1	Palamós CF	40	27	7	6	87	35	+52	88	Promotion play-offs
2	FC Barcelona C	40	26	6	8	88	38	+50	84	Promotion play-offs
3	UE Badaloní	40	22	9	9	76	56	+20	75	Promotion play-offs
4	CE Europa	40	22	8	10	78	50	+28	74	Promotion play-offs
5	CD Tortosa	40	21	7	12	57	35	+22	70	
6	Vilobí CF	40	19	4	17	65	59	+6	61	
7	UE Tàrrega	40	18	7	15	56	55	+1	61	
8	CE Premià	40	17	9	14	54	42	+12	60	
9	CE Mataró	40	16	11	13	67	47	+20	59	
10	FC Santboià	40	15	10	15	51	55	−4	55	
11	FC Vilafranca	40	14	10	16	42	51	−9	52	
12	UE Rubí	40	13	12	15	44	51	−7	51	
13	UE Vilassar de Mar	40	13	12	15	54	62	−8	51	
14	CE Júpiter	40	14	9	17	58	68	−10	51	
15	CD Banyoles	40	15	6	19	46	62	−16	51	
16	UD Cerdanyola de Mataró (R)	40	14	8	18	73	82	−9	50	Relegation
17	Atlètic Roda de Barà (R)	40	14	8	18	54	57	−3	50	Relegation
18	CF Balaguer (R)	40	13	11	16	40	56	−16	50	Relegation
19	Girona FC (R)	40	6	8	26	44	80	−36	26	Relegation
20	EC Granollers (R)	40	5	11	24	36	72	−36	26	Relegation
21	UE Sants (R)	40	6	7	27	39	96	−57	25	Relegation

Source: Fútbol Regional
(R) Relegated

=== Group 6 ===
Pos	Team	Pld	W	D	L	GF	GA	GD	Pts	Qualification or relegation
1	CD Alcoyano	40	26	12	2	81	30	+51	90	Promotion play-offs
2	Ontinyent CF	40	25	9	6	78	29	+49	84	Promotion play-offs
3	Novelda CF	40	21	10	9	65	35	+30	73	Promotion play-offs
4	CD Olímpic de Xàtiva	40	19	15	6	63	44	+19	72	Promotion play-offs
5	Pinoso CF	40	18	14	8	45	21	+24	68	
6	CD Burriana	40	19	10	11	69	50	+19	67	
7	AD Español de San Vicente	40	18	10	12	56	42	+14	64	
8	CD Eldense	40	17	11	12	64	41	+23	62	
9	Burjassot CF	40	12	20	8	42	41	+1	56	
10	CD Acero	40	14	9	17	44	53	−9	51	
11	CD Onda	40	12	15	13	58	59	−1	51	
12	CD Utiel	40	12	14	14	43	46	−3	50	
13	UD Vall de Uxó	40	13	10	17	41	53	−12	49	
14	Gimnástico CF	40	12	13	15	61	56	+5	49	
15	CD San Marcelino	40	12	12	16	52	50	+2	48	
16	Pego CF	40	11	13	16	40	56	−16	46	
17	SD Sueca	40	12	10	18	39	57	−18	46	
18	CD Almoradí (R)	40	12	8	20	49	58	−9	44	Relegation
19	Alicante CF (R)	40	6	8	26	31	90	−59	26	Relegation
20	Crevillente Deportivo (R)	40	4	10	26	27	83	−56	22	Relegation
21	Mutxamel CF (R)	40	5	7	28	19	73	−54	22	Relegation

Source: Fútbol Regional
(R) Relegated

=== Group 7 ===
Pos	Team	Pld	W	D	L	GF	GA	GD	Pts	Qualification or relegation
1	CF Rayo Majadahonda	42	23	8	11	58	37	+21	77	Promotion play-offs
2	DAV Santa Ana	42	22	10	10	81	43	+38	76	Promotion play-offs
3	RSD Alcalá	42	21	11	10	60	40	+20	74	Promotion play-offs
4	CD Leganés B	42	19	16	7	59	34	+25	73	Promotion play-offs
5	CD Móstoles	42	21	10	11	70	42	+28	73	
6	UD San Sebastián de los Reyes	42	21	8	13	60	37	+23	71	
7	AD Colmenar Viejo	42	17	14	11	64	57	+7	65	
8	CD Pegaso	42	19	7	16	62	52	+10	64	
9	Rayo Vallecano B	42	17	10	15	59	48	+11	61	
10	CD Fuencarral	42	17	8	17	72	71	+1	59	
11	Atlético Valdemoro	42	16	10	16	57	65	−8	58	
12	AD Parla	42	16	10	16	56	59	−3	58	
13	CP Amorós	42	15	13	14	59	50	+9	58	
14	AD Torrejón	42	14	14	14	57	51	+6	56	
15	CD Coslada	42	14	13	15	62	53	+9	55	
16	CD San Fernando de Henares	42	14	12	16	45	47	−2	54	
17	CD Puerta Bonita	42	13	13	16	61	69	−8	52	
18	AD Orcasitas (R)	42	14	10	18	35	50	−15	52	Relegation
19	CD Fortuna (R)	42	13	9	20	59	72	−13	48	Relegation
20	CU Collado Villalba (R)	42	8	7	27	36	89	−53	31	Relegation
21	SR Villaverde Boetticher CF (R)	42	6	11	25	29	81	−52	29	Relegation
22	CD Vicálvaro (R)	42	4	12	26	28	82	−54	24	Relegation

Source: Fútbol Regional
(R) Relegated

=== Group 8 ===
Pos	Team	Pld	W	D	L	GF	GA	GD	Pts	Qualification or relegation
1	Burgos CF	36	28	4	4	81	23	+58	88	Promotion play-offs
2	CF Palencia	36	22	9	5	80	36	+44	75	Promotion play-offs
3	CD Salmantino	36	20	10	6	43	20	+23	70	Promotion play-offs
4	Zamora CF	36	20	6	10	54	35	+19	66	Promotion play-offs
5	CA Bembibre	36	19	8	9	73	43	+30	65	
6	SD Ponferradina	35	18	9	8	53	36	+17	60	
7	Racing Lermeño	36	14	14	8	43	37	+6	56	
8	CD Nava Molduras	36	16	7	13	55	46	+9	55	
9	RCD Ribert	35	13	10	12	45	43	+2	49	
10	La Bañeza FC	36	13	9	14	40	43	−3	48	
11	CD Laguna	36	13	8	15	40	46	−6	47	
12	Real Ávila CF	36	10	12	14	33	35	−2	42	
13	Atlético Astorga FC	36	11	7	18	44	58	−14	40	
14	SD Hullera Vasco-Leonesa	36	11	4	21	36	52	−16	37	
15	Arandina CF	36	11	4	21	48	68	−20	37	
16	SD Gimnástica Segoviana	36	8	12	16	40	52	−12	36	
17	CD Béjar Industrial	36	9	8	19	27	55	−28	35	
18	SD Almazán (R)	36	4	8	24	29	75	−46	20	Relegation
19	CD Íscar Industrial (R)	36	4	5	27	37	98	−61	17	Relegation

Source: Fútbol Regional
(R) Relegated

=== Group 9 ===
Pos	Team	Pld	W	D	L	GF	GA	GD	Pts	Qualification or relegation
1	Motril CF	40	24	10	6	77	26	+51	82	Promotion play-offs
2	UD Maracena	40	23	10	7	69	27	+42	79	Promotion play-offs
3	CD Linares	40	21	12	7	62	28	+34	75	Promotion play-offs
4	Úbeda CF	40	18	11	11	68	44	+24	65	Promotion play-offs
5	Martos CD	40	15	16	9	52	32	+20	61	
6	Juventud de Torremolinos CF	40	16	12	12	52	47	+5	60	
7	UD San Isidro de Níjar	40	16	11	13	53	48	+5	59	
8	UD Manilva-Sabinillas	40	15	13	12	61	43	+18	58	
9	UD Fuengirola	40	17	7	16	57	56	+1	58	
10	CP Granada 74	40	15	11	14	52	54	−2	56	
11	Málaga CF B	40	14	13	13	62	45	+17	55	
12	Recreativo Granada	40	16	5	19	64	67	−3	53	
13	Baeza CF	40	14	11	15	49	40	+9	53	
14	CD Roquetas	40	15	7	18	61	56	+5	52	
15	CD Mármol Macael	40	13	12	15	44	47	−3	51	
16	Antequera CF	40	13	11	16	47	50	−3	50	
17	Arenas de Armilla CD	40	12	13	15	50	56	−6	49	
18	UD Melilla B (R)	40	12	11	17	46	64	−18	47	Relegation
19	CD Baza (R)	40	14	5	21	42	61	−19	47	Relegation
20	Atarfe Industrial CF (R)	40	9	12	19	47	81	−34	39	Relegation
21	CDUD Carboneras (R)	40	0	3	37	10	153	−143	3	Relegation

Source: Fútbol Regional
(R) Relegated

=== Group 10 ===
Pos	Team	Pld	W	D	L	GF	GA	GD	Pts	Qualification or relegation
1	Atlético Ceutí	42	23	10	9	69	41	+28	79	Promotion play-offs
2	Isla Cristina CD	42	21	13	8	76	40	+36	76	Promotion play-offs
3	Algeciras CF	42	20	12	10	61	39	+22	72	Promotion play-offs
4	Ayamonte CF	42	19	14	9	64	38	+26	71	Promotion play-offs
5	Viña Verde Montilla CF	42	21	7	14	62	51	+11	70	
6	UD Los Palacios	42	18	12	12	60	44	+16	66	
7	CD San Fernando	42	19	9	14	67	57	+10	66	
8	Atlético Sanluqueño CF	42	17	13	12	59	53	+6	64	
9	CD Pozoblanco	42	17	10	15	55	49	+6	61	
10	Coria CF	42	15	14	13	47	51	−4	59	
11	CD Rota	42	16	11	15	57	58	−1	59	
12	CD San Roque de Lepe	42	16	9	17	57	56	+1	57	
13	RB Linense	42	13	16	13	57	52	+5	55	
14	Cádiz CF B	42	15	9	18	51	55	−4	54	
15	La Palma CF	42	15	9	18	51	54	−3	54	
16	CD Utrera	42	14	12	16	71	49	+22	54	
17	Atlético Lucentino Industrial	42	14	8	20	53	69	−16	50	
18	Chiclana CF	42	13	11	18	45	59	−14	50	
19	Dos Hermanas CF (R)	42	12	14	16	53	60	−7	50	Relegation
20	CD Mairena (R)	42	6	19	17	36	62	−26	37	Relegation
21	Conil CF (R)	42	7	12	23	30	77	−47	33	Relegation
22	UD Roteña (R)	42	5	8	29	23	90	−67	23	Relegation

Source: Fútbol Regional
(R) Relegated

=== Group 11 ===
Pos	Team	Pld	W	D	L	GF	GA	GD	Pts	Qualification or relegation
1	CD Constancia	38	23	10	5	74	25	+49	79	Promotion play-offs
2	CD Atlético Baleares	38	22	12	4	61	23	+38	78	Promotion play-offs
3	CF Sóller	38	21	13	4	84	28	+56	76	Promotion play-offs
4	CD Manacor	38	20	8	10	52	33	+19	68	Promotion play-offs
5	UD Poblense	38	17	13	8	62	35	+27	64	
6	CD Binisalem	38	16	13	9	45	34	+11	61	
7	CD Ferriolense	38	16	12	10	50	32	+18	60	
8	SCR Peña Deportiva	38	16	12	10	60	42	+18	60	
9	CD Campos	38	17	8	13	59	53	+6	59	
10	CF Sporting Mahonés	38	14	9	15	57	54	+3	51	
11	CD Playas de Calvià	38	9	18	11	53	53	0	45	
12	Atlètic de Ciutadella	38	12	9	17	44	75	−31	45	
13	CF Pollença	38	11	11	16	38	42	−4	44	
14	SD Portmany	38	9	13	16	36	47	−11	40	
15	CD Alayor	38	8	13	17	39	62	−23	37	
16	CD Cardassar	38	7	15	16	27	47	−20	36	
17	CE Andratx	38	9	9	20	45	72	−27	36	
18	CD Esporles (R)	38	8	12	18	44	69	−25	36	Relegation
19	CE Felanitx (R)	38	7	9	22	42	87	−45	30	Relegation
20	UD Alaró (R)	38	4	9	25	27	86	−59	21	Relegation

Source: Fútbol Regional
(R) Relegated

=== Group 12 ===
Pos	Team	Pld	W	D	L	GF	GA	GD	Pts	Qualification or relegation
1	SD Tenisca	38	25	6	7	66	30	+36	81	Promotion play-offs
2	CD Tenerife B	38	23	8	7	73	30	+43	77	Promotion play-offs
3	CD Maspalomas	38	23	7	8	58	29	+29	76	Promotion play-offs
4	UD Pájara Playas de Jandía	38	23	7	8	76	34	+42	76	Promotion play-offs
5	CD Corralejo	38	21	9	8	72	33	+39	72	
6	UD Vecindario	38	19	10	9	50	28	+22	67	
7	UD Telde	38	15	16	7	49	34	+15	61	
8	UD Lanzarote	38	15	13	10	53	50	+3	58	
9	UD Las Palmas B	38	15	13	10	64	40	+24	58	
10	CD Victoria	38	14	7	17	40	57	−17	49	
11	CD Puerto Cruz	38	14	6	18	43	45	−2	48	
12	Atlético Arona	38	11	12	15	40	35	+5	45	
13	UD Orotava	38	11	12	15	48	55	−7	45	
14	CD Doramas	38	12	8	18	35	52	−17	44	
15	UD Ibarra	38	10	13	15	28	40	−12	40	
16	Estrella CF	38	9	12	17	32	61	−29	39	
17	CD Atlético Paso	38	10	8	20	46	67	−21	38	
18	CD Arguineguín (R)	38	8	6	24	28	67	−39	30	Relegation
19	UD San Antonio (R)	38	4	7	27	30	92	−62	19	Relegation
20	Real Artesano FC (R)	38	4	8	26	37	89	−52	11	Relegation

Source: Fútbol Regional
(R) Relegated

=== Group 13 ===
Pos	Team	Pld	W	D	L	GF	GA	GD	Pts	Qualification or relegation
1	Cartagonova FC	32	23	7	2	95	17	+78	76	Promotion play-offs
2	Lorca CF	32	19	12	1	67	20	+47	69	Promotion play-offs
3	Jumilla CF	32	20	4	8	60	35	+25	64	Promotion play-offs
4	Águilas CF	32	18	9	5	67	31	+36	63	Promotion play-offs
5	Caravaca CF	32	15	10	7	35	24	+11	55	
6	AD Relesa Las Palmas	32	16	7	9	48	37	+11	55	
7	CD Alquerías	32	14	7	11	51	43	+8	49	
8	CD Bullense	32	12	11	9	33	34	−1	47	
9	Real Murcia CF B	32	11	13	8	50	42	+8	46	
10	CD Abarán	32	10	10	12	49	54	−5	40	
11	Club Olímpico de Totana	32	10	7	15	40	49	−9	37	
12	Pinatar CF	32	10	4	18	39	69	−30	34	
13	AD Cotillas CF	32	8	8	16	33	49	−16	32	
14	CF Santomera	32	7	8	17	29	56	−27	29	
15	CD Beniel	32	6	4	22	30	82	−52	22	
16	CD Los Garres	32	4	5	23	34	73	−39	17	
17	Blanca CF	32	2	8	22	19	64	−45	14	
18	Cartagena FC (R)	0	0	0	0	0	0	0	0	Relegation
19	CD Torre Pacheco (R)	0	0	0	0	0	0	0	0	Relegation
20	CD Cutillas Fortuna (R)	0	0	0	0	0	0	0	0	Relegation

Source: Fútbol Regional
(R) Relegated

=== Group 14 ===
Pos	Team	Pld	W	D	L	GF	GA	GD	Pts	Qualification or relegation
1	Jerez CF	38	27	6	5	83	22	+61	87	Promotion play-offs
2	Moralo CP	38	26	7	5	98	29	+69	85	Promotion play-offs
3	UP Plasencia	38	24	8	6	70	27	+43	80	Promotion play-offs
4	CD Grabasa Burguillos	38	22	10	6	72	31	+41	76	Promotion play-offs
5	UD Mérida Promesas	38	22	10	6	72	22	+50	76	
6	CD Don Benito	38	20	4	14	61	45	+16	64	
7	CD Badajoz B	38	18	6	14	44	43	+1	60	
8	UC La Estrella	38	17	8	13	56	37	+19	59	
9	SP Villafranca	38	16	7	15	59	40	+19	55	
10	CD Santa Amalia	38	13	11	14	44	57	−13	50	
11	UD Montijo	38	14	7	17	47	58	−11	49	
12	CD Guadiana	38	14	5	19	40	63	−23	47	
13	Olivenza CP	38	11	11	16	45	60	−15	44	
14	CD Zafra Industrial	38	13	5	20	47	58	−11	44	
15	CD Castuera	38	10	11	17	43	55	−12	41	
16	SC Villanueva	38	10	10	18	40	56	−16	40	
17	CD Coria	38	9	7	22	34	80	−46	34	
18	CD Miajadas (R)	38	9	7	22	29	72	−43	34	Relegation
19	CP Guareña (R)	38	6	6	26	19	77	−58	24	Relegation
20	UD Fregenal (R)	38	4	4	30	23	94	−71	16	Relegation

Source: Fútbol Regional
(R) Relegated

=== Group 15 ===
Pos	Team	Pld	W	D	L	GF	GA	GD	Pts	Qualification or relegation
1	Peña Sport FC	40	21	13	6	71	35	+36	76	Promotion play-offs
2	UDC Chantrea	40	19	15	6	73	50	+23	72	Promotion play-offs
3	CD Oberena	40	19	12	9	56	26	+30	69	Promotion play-offs
4	Haro Deportivo	40	19	11	10	44	28	+16	68	Promotion play-offs
5	CD Alfaro	40	18	10	12	59	55	+4	64	
6	CD Calahorra	40	18	7	15	62	45	+17	61	
7	CD Egüés	40	16	12	12	59	37	+22	60	
8	CD Ribaforada	40	14	14	12	42	45	−3	56	
9	CD Azkoyen	40	16	8	16	69	68	+1	56	
10	Atlético Artajonés	40	15	11	14	60	52	+8	56	
11	UCD Burladés	40	14	11	15	43	42	+1	53	
12	CD Cortes	40	14	11	15	49	63	−14	53	
13	AD San Juan	40	13	13	14	36	35	+1	52	
14	CD Beti Onak	40	13	10	17	36	55	−19	49	
15	AD Noáin	40	13	10	17	32	44	−12	49	
16	CD Aoiz	40	11	15	14	41	44	−3	48	
17	CD Tudelano	40	10	16	14	40	50	−10	46	
18	CD Baztán (R)	40	12	8	20	52	55	−3	44	Relegation
19	CD Varea (R)	40	10	11	19	35	60	−25	41	Relegation
20	CA River Ebro (R)	40	9	13	18	44	71	−27	40	Relegation
21	CF Rapid Murillo (R)	40	5	11	24	32	75	−43	26	Relegation

Source: Fútbol Regional
(R) Relegated

=== Group 16 ===
Pos	Team	Pld	W	D	L	GF	GA	GD	Pts	Qualification or relegation
1	CD Binéfar	38	28	3	7	80	36	+44	87	Promotion play-offs
2	UD Barbastro	38	25	7	6	82	27	+55	82	Promotion play-offs
3	CD Endesa Andorra	38	23	11	4	100	31	+69	80	Promotion play-offs
4	UD Fraga	38	22	9	7	70	39	+31	75	Promotion play-offs
5	UD Casetas	38	21	10	7	77	42	+35	73	
6	CD Sariñena	38	17	10	11	58	44	+14	61	
7	Atlético Monzón	38	18	6	14	59	40	+19	60	
8	CD Teruel	38	15	14	9	55	36	+19	59	
9	SD Ejea	38	17	7	14	55	41	+14	58	
10	Utebo FC	38	14	9	15	62	57	+5	51	
11	Alcañiz CF	38	15	5	18	59	67	−8	50	
12	CF Illueca	38	13	8	17	57	67	−10	47	
13	Atlético Monzalbarba	38	12	9	17	54	59	−5	45	
14	CF Figueruelas	38	11	10	17	56	72	−16	43	
15	CD La Almunia	38	11	8	19	50	74	−24	41	
16	CJD Peralta	38	9	10	19	49	76	−27	37	
17	CF Lalueza	38	8	12	18	38	65	−27	36	
18	CD Ebro (R)	38	8	8	22	33	64	−31	32	Relegation
19	AD Épila CF (R)	38	5	9	24	36	92	−56	24	Relegation
20	CD Utrillas (R)	38	1	9	28	26	127	−101	12	Relegation

Source: Fútbol Regional
(R) Relegated

=== Group 17 ===
Pos	Team	Pld	W	D	L	GF	GA	GD	Pts	Qualification or relegation
1	Tomelloso CF	38	24	8	6	72	24	+48	80	Promotion play-offs
2	CD Torrijos	38	22	11	5	55	17	+38	77	Promotion play-offs
3	CP Villarrobledo	38	19	13	6	53	26	+27	70	Promotion play-offs
4	UB Conquense	38	19	13	6	63	35	+28	70	Promotion play-offs
5	CF Valdepeñas	38	19	9	10	39	29	+10	66	
6	CD Guadalajara	38	19	8	11	43	28	+15	65	
7	Puertollano Industrial CF	38	18	9	11	66	42	+24	63	
8	Hellín Deportivo	38	16	14	8	50	28	+22	62	
9	UD Socuéllamos CF	38	16	10	12	40	35	+5	58	
10	Almagro CF	38	15	10	13	60	52	+8	55	
11	CF Gimnástico Alcázar	38	14	8	16	53	50	+3	50	
12	CF La Solana	38	13	7	18	44	66	−22	46	
13	Atlético Teresiano	38	12	9	17	50	59	−9	45	
14	CD Bolañego	38	12	6	20	38	60	−22	42	
15	CF Belmonte	38	11	6	21	40	86	−46	39	
16	CD Azuqueca	38	9	10	19	35	45	−10	37	
17	AD Torpedo 66	38	9	9	20	32	57	−25	36	
18	AD Campillo (R)	38	8	10	20	31	58	−27	34	Relegation
19	Manzanares CF (R)	38	8	10	20	34	61	−27	34	Relegation
20	Mora CF (R)	38	4	6	28	31	71	−40	15	Relegation

Source: Fútbol Regional
(R) Relegated

== Playoffs ==
- 1996–97 Segunda División B Play-Off
