= 1994 Tercera División play-offs =

Spanish football league play-offs

The 1994 Tercera División play-offs to Segunda División B from Tercera División (Promotion play-offs) were the final playoffs for the promotion from 1993–94 Tercera División to 1994–95 Segunda División B. The first four teams of each group took part in the play-off.

== Group A-1 ==
Pos	Team	Pld	W	D	L	GF	GA	GD	Pts	Promotion or Qualification
1	Aranjuez	6	4	2	0	11	1	+10	10	Promotion to Segunda División B
2	Lealtad	6	3	1	2	7	6	+1	7	
3	Fabril	6	2	0	4	7	9	−2	4	
4	Atlético Bembibre	6	1	1	4	5	14	−9	3	

Updated to match(es) played on 12 June 1994. Source: RFEF

== Group A-2 ==
Pos	Team	Pld	W	D	L	GF	GA	GD	Pts	Promotion or Qualification
1	Fuenlabrada	6	4	0	2	14	7	+7	8	Promotion to Segunda División B
2	Bergantiños	6	4	0	2	8	5	+3	8	
3	Marino de Luanco	6	2	0	4	14	16	−2	4	
4	Hullera	6	2	0	4	7	15	−8	4	

Updated to match(es) played on 12 June 1994. Source: RFEF

== Group A-3 ==
Pos	Team	Pld	W	D	L	GF	GA	GD	Pts	Promotion or Qualification
1	Móstoles	6	4	1	1	8	4	+4	9	Promotion to Segunda División B
2	Caudal	6	3	1	2	12	9	+3	7	
3	Salmantino	6	1	3	2	6	8	−2	5	
4	Endesa As Pontes	6	0	3	3	7	12	−5	3	

Updated to match(es) played on 12 June 1994. Source: RFEF

== Group A-4 ==
Pos	Team	Pld	W	D	L	GF	GA	GD	Pts	Promotion or Qualification
1	Moscardó	6	3	2	1	9	4	+5	8	Promotion to Segunda División B
2	Siero	6	3	1	2	6	6	0	7	
3	Laguna	6	2	1	3	8	10	−2	5	
4	Viveiro	6	1	2	3	6	9	−3	4	

Updated to match(es) played on 12 June 1994. Source: RFEF

== Group B-1 ==
Pos	Team	Pld	W	D	L	GF	GA	GD	Pts	Promotion or Qualification
1	Gernika	6	5	1	0	9	0	+9	11	Promotion to Segunda División B
2	Huesca	6	4	1	1	15	1	+14	9	
3	Racing de Santander B	6	2	0	4	8	10	−2	4	
4	Chantrea	6	0	0	6	1	22	−21	0	

Updated to match(es) played on 12 June 1994. Source: RFEF

== Group B-2 ==
Pos	Team	Pld	W	D	L	GF	GA	GD	Pts	Promotion or Qualification
1	Real Zaragoza B	6	4	0	2	8	2	+6	8	Promotion to Segunda División B
2	Cultural Durango	6	3	2	1	6	1	+5	8	
3	Calahorra	6	3	0	3	4	8	−4	6	
4	Noja	6	0	2	4	1	8	−7	2	

Updated to match(es) played on 12 June 1994. Source: RFEF

== Group B-3 ==
Pos	Team	Pld	W	D	L	GF	GA	GD	Pts	Promotion or Qualification
1	Amurrio	6	4	1	1	14	10	+4	9	Promotion to Segunda División B
2	Ribaforada	6	2	2	2	9	9	0	6	
3	Barbastro	6	1	3	2	11	11	0	5	
4	Laredo	6	1	2	3	6	10	−4	4	

Updated to match(es) played on 12 June 1994. Source: RFEF

== Group B-4 ==
Pos	Team	Pld	W	D	L	GF	GA	GD	Pts	Promotion or Qualification
1	Casetas	6	4	2	0	13	1	+12	10	Promotion to Segunda División B
2	Aurrerá de Vitoria	6	3	2	1	12	7	+5	8	
3	Peña Sport	6	2	1	3	12	16	−4	5	
4	Castro	6	0	1	5	6	19	−13	1	

Updated to match(es) played on 12 June 1994. Source: RFEF

== Group C-1 ==
Pos	Team	Pld	W	D	L	GF	GA	GD	Pts	Promotion or Qualification
1	Europa	6	3	3	0	8	2	+6	9	Promotion to Segunda División B
2	Pinoso	6	3	1	2	7	4	+3	7	
3	Montuïri	6	2	0	4	7	11	−4	4	
4	Roldán	6	1	2	3	3	8	−5	4	

Updated to match(es) played on 12 June 1994. Source: RFEF

== Group C-2 ==
Pos	Team	Pld	W	D	L	GF	GA	GD	Pts	Promotion or Qualification
1	Sabadell	6	3	3	0	7	3	+4	9	Promotion to Segunda División B
2	Caravaca	6	2	1	3	7	6	+1	5	
3	Crevillente	6	1	2	3	7	9	−2	4	
4	Atlético Baleares	6	1	2	3	5	8	−3	4	

Updated to match(es) played on 12 April 1994. Source: RFEF

== Group C-3 ==
Pos	Team	Pld	W	D	L	GF	GA	GD	Pts	Promotion or Qualification
1	Terrassa	6	4	1	1	10	3	+7	9	Promotion to Segunda División B
2	Mallorca B	6	4	1	1	22	9	+13	9	
3	Torre Pacheco	6	1	1	4	6	23	−17	3	
4	Eldense	6	1	1	4	8	11	−3	3	

Updated to match(es) played on 12 June 1994. Source: RFEF

== Group C-4 ==
Pos	Team	Pld	W	D	L	GF	GA	GD	Pts	Promotion or Qualification
1	Ontinyent	6	3	2	1	9	3	+6	8	Promotion to Segunda División B
2	Águilas	6	3	2	1	13	1	+12	8	
3	FC Barcelona C	6	3	1	2	12	8	+4	7	
4	Cala Millor	6	0	1	5	2	24	−22	1	

Updated to match(es) played on 12 June 1994. Source: RFEF

== Group D-1 ==
Pos	Team	Pld	W	D	L	GF	GA	GD	Pts	Promotion or Qualification
1	Betis B	6	4	2	0	17	5	+12	10	Promotion to Segunda División B
2	Plasencia	6	2	3	1	9	7	+2	7	
3	Puertollano	6	2	1	3	6	9	−3	5	
4	Martos	6	1	0	5	4	15	−11	2	

Updated to match(es) played on 12 June 1994. Source: RFEF

== Group D-2 ==
Pos	Team	Pld	W	D	L	GF	GA	GD	Pts	Promotion or Qualification
1	Polideportivo Almería	6	3	2	1	10	4	+6	8	Promotion to Segunda División B
2	Los Palacios	6	2	3	1	7	5	+2	7	
3	Villarrobledo	6	2	1	3	4	6	−2	5	
4	Don Benito	6	1	2	3	6	12	−6	4	

Updated to match(es) played on 12 June 1994. Source: RFEF

== Group D-3 ==
Pos	Team	Pld	W	D	L	GF	GA	GD	Pts	Promotion or Qualification
1	Manchego	6	5	0	1	10	4	+6	10	Promotion to Segunda División B
2	Vélez	6	4	1	1	12	4	+8	9	
3	Mérida B	6	1	1	4	5	8	−3	3	
4	Atlético Cortegana	6	1	0	5	4	15	−11	2	

Updated to match(es) played on 12 June 1994. Source: RFEF

== Group D-4 ==
Pos	Team	Pld	W	D	L	GF	GA	GD	Pts	Promotion or Qualification
1	San Fernando	6	3	2	1	7	4	+3	8	Promotion to Segunda División B
2	Guadix	6	2	3	1	10	8	+2	7	
3	Ciudad Real	6	1	3	2	7	8	−1	5	
4	Cristian Lay	6	2	0	4	5	9	−4	4	

Updated to match(es) played on 12 June 1994. Source: RFEF

== Group E ==
Pos	Team	Pld	W	D	L	GF	GA	GD	Pts	Promotion or Qualification
1	Corralejo	6	4	1	1	13	5	+8	9	Promotion to Segunda División B
2	Tenisca	6	3	1	2	12	10	+2	7	
3	Las Palmas B	6	2	1	3	12	12	0	5	
4	Orotava	6	1	1	4	5	15	−10	3	

Updated to match(es) played on 12 June 1994. Source: RFEF

== See also ==
- 1993–94 Tercera División
