= Iván Martínez (footballer, born 1983) =

Spanish footballer and manager

Personal information
- Full name: Iván Martínez Puyol
- Date of birth: 1 March 1983 (age 43)
- Place of birth: Zaragoza, Spain
- Height: 1.70 m (5 ft 7 in)
- Position: Midfielder

Team information
- Current team: Yeclano (manager)

Youth career
- Amistad
- Zaragoza

Senior career*
Years	Team	Apps	(Gls)
2001–2003	Zaragoza B	10	(0)
2002–2003	Universidad Zaragoza	31	(2)
2003–2005	Casetas	60	(2)
2005–2006	Osasuna B	19	(3)
2006–2007	Barbastro	31	(2)
2007–2008	Villajoyosa	13	(2)
2008–2011	La Muela	49	(14)
2011	Villajoyosa	18	(1)
2011–2014	Sariñena	103	(18)
2014–2015	Teruel	33	(4)
Total		367	(48)

Managerial career
- 2013: Sariñena (player-manager)
- 2015–2020: Zaragoza (youth)
- 2020: Zaragoza B
- 2020: Zaragoza
- 2020–2021: Zaragoza B
- 2022–2025: Ejea
- 2025–: Yeclano
- * Club domestic league appearances and goals

Iván Martínez Puyol (born 1 March 1983) is a Spanish football coach and a former central midfielder who is the manager of Segunda Federación club Yeclano.

== Playing career ==
Born in Zaragoza, Aragon, Martínez finished his formation with hometown side Real Zaragoza, and started to feature for the reserves during the 2001–02 season, in Segunda División B. He would be regularly used in the farm team the following campaign, but failed to make the breakthrough into the first team.

After two years with UD Casetas (suffering relegation from the third division in his first), Martínez moved to CA Osasuna B, also in division three. He continued to appear in both third and fourth tiers for the remainder of his career, representing UD Barbastro, Villajoyosa CF (two stints), CD La Muela, CD Sariñena (where he acted as team captain) and CD Teruel.

In 2015, aged 32, Martínez announced his retirement.

== Coaching career ==
In October 2013, while still a player, Martínez was named interim manager of Sariñena. His tenure lasted one match, a 0–0 home draw against Getafe CF B, and he subsequently returned to his playing role after the appointment of Manolo Villanova.

In 2015, shortly after retiring, Martínez returned to his first club Zaragoza, being appointed in charge of the Infantil B squad. He later worked with the Cadete B and Juvenil A squad, managing the latter side in the 2019–20 UEFA Youth League.

On 22 July 2020, Martínez was appointed manager of Zaragoza's B-team in the fourth division. On 9 November, he took over the main squad in the place of sacked Rubén Baraja; initially an interim, he was announced as manager by director of football Lalo Arantegui two days later.

Martínez's first professional match in charge of the Blanquillos occurred on 13 November 2020, a 1–2 home loss against Real Oviedo. On 13 December, he returned to the reserves after the appointment of Juan Ignacio Martínez in the main squad.

== Managerial statistics ==
As of 22 February 2025

Managerial record by team and tenure
Team	Nat	From	To	Record								Ref
Team	Nat	From	To	G	W	D	L	GF	GA	GD	Win %	Ref
Sariñena (interim)	(Spain)	10 October 2013	14 October 2013	1	0	1	0	0	0	+0	0.00	
Zaragoza B	(Spain)	22 July 2020	9 November 2020	1	0	1	0	1	1	+0	0.00	
Zaragoza	(Spain)	9 November 2020	13 December 2020	8	1	0	7	4	11	−7	12.50	
Zaragoza B	(Spain)	13 December 2020	1 July 2021	21	7	9	5	22	12	+10	33.33	
Ejea	(Spain)	21 January 2022	Present	122	52	36	34	167	127	+40	42.62	
Total				153	60	47	46	194	151	+43	39.22	—
