= Erik Rafael =

Spanish footballer

Personal information
- Full name: Erik Rafael Barragán
- Date of birth: 13 March 2000 (age 26)
- Place of birth: Barcelona, Spain
- Position: Forward

Team information
- Current team: Grama

Youth career
- Barceloneta
- Damm
- 2015–2018: Espanyol
- 2018–2019: Betis

Senior career*
Years	Team	Apps	(Gls)
2019–2020	Betis B	0	(0)
2019–2020	→ Horta (loan)	18	(9)
2020	Mallorca B	5	(0)
2020–2021	Manresa	25	(3)
2021–2022	Mirandés B	29	(13)
2021–2022	Mirandés	1	(0)
2022–2023	Burgos B	11	(4)
2023	Manresa	10	(0)
2024–	Grama	0	(0)
- * Club domestic league appearances and goals as of 31 December 2021

Erik Rafael Barragán (born 13 March 2000) is a Spanish professional footballer who plays as a forward for FE Grama.

== Club career ==
Born in Barcelona, Catalonia, Rafael represented CF Barceloneta, CF Damm, RCD Espanyol, and Real Betis as a youth. On 20 August 2019, after finishing his youth career, he was loaned to a Tercera División side, UA Horta for the season.

Rafael made his senior debut on 31 August 2019, starting in a 1–2 home loss to CF Pobla de Mafumet, and scored his first senior goal on 7 September by scoring the opener in a 4–0 away win over CF Igualada. The following 30 January, after scoring nine goals, he left the club and signed with RCD Mallorca's B-team.

On 6 September 2020, Rafael joined CE Manresa also in the fourth tier. On 26 July of the following year, he agreed to a contract with CD Mirandés and was assigned to the reserves in Tercera División RFEF.

Rafael made his first team debut for the Jabatos on 1 December 2021, coming on as a late substitute for Unai Rementería in a 3–0 away win over CD San Roque de Lepe, in the season's Copa del Rey. His professional debut occurred the following 2 January, as he replaced Imanol García de Albéniz late into a 2–0 home win over Real Zaragoza in the Segunda División championship.
