= 1994–95 Segunda División B =

Segunda División B
- Season: 1994–95
- Promoted: Alavés; Sestao Sport; Almería CF; Écija Balompié
- Relegated: Real Oviedo B Real Ávila; Corralejo; Realejos; Gimnástica de Torrelavega; Real Zaragoza B Gernika; Hullera Vasco-Leonesa; Murcia; Girona; Europa; Premià; San Fernando; San Roque de Lepe; Cacereño; Manchego; Casetas
- Top goalscorer: José Luis Garzón; Javi Prendes (24 goals)
- Best goalkeeper: Laureano Echevarría (0.46 goals)
- Biggest home win: Oviedo B 8–1 Realejos (16 October 1994); Sant Andreu 7–0 Sabadell (2 October 1994)
- Biggest away win: Premià 0–7 Elche (5 February 1995)
- Highest scoring: Alavés 8–5 Real Unión (30 October 1994)

The 1994–95 Segunda División B season started August 1994 and ended May 1995.

== Summary before the 1994–95 season ==
Playoffs de Ascenso:

- Salamanca (P)
- Getafe (P)
- Orense (P)
- Langreo
- Alavés
- Sestao Sport
- Numancia
- Barakaldo
- Gramenet
- Manlleu
- Levante
- Figueres
- Extremadura (P)
- Las Palmas
- Recreativo de Huelva
- Jaén

Relegated from Segunda División:

- Castellón
- Murcia
- Cádiz
- Real Burgos

Promoted from Tercera División:

- Gernika (from Group 4)
- Amurrio (from Group 4)
- Europa (from Group 5)
- Sabadell (from Group 5)
- Terrassa (from Group 5)
- Ontinyent (from Group 6)
- Aranjuez (from Group 7)
- Fuenlabrada (from Group 7)
- Móstoles (from Group 7)
- Moscardó (from Group 7)
- Polideportivo Almería (from Group 9)
- Betis B (from Group 10)
- San Fernando (from Group 10)
- Corralejo (from Group 12)
- Zaragoza B (from Group 16)
- Casetas (from Group 16)
- Manchego (from Group 17)

Relegated:

- Cultural Leonesa
- Tomelloso
- Ponferradina
- Celta Turista
- Basconia
- Andorra
- Utebo
- Touring
- Rubí
- Peña Deportiva
- Cieza
- Manacor
- Ejido
- Atlético Malagueño
- CD Estepona
- Maspalomas
- Arosa

Administrative relegation:

- Real Burgos (financial trouble)

Occupied the vacant spots by administrative relegations:

- Hullera Vasco-Leonesa (occupied the vacant spot of Real Burgos)

== Group I ==
Teams from Asturias, Canary Islands, Castile and León, Galicia and Madrid.

=== Teams ===
Location of teams in Segunda División B Gr. 1 1994–95
Canary Islands

Team	Founded	Home city	Stadium
Aranjuez	1948	Aranjuez, Madrid	Municipal de Deportes
Atlético Madrid B	1969	Madrid, Madrid	Vicente Calderón
Real Ávila	1923	Ávila, Castile and Leon	Adolfo Suárez
Real Avilés Industrial	1903	Avilés, Asturias	Román Sánchez Puerta
Corralejo	1975	Corralejo, Canary Islands	Vicente Carreño Alonso
Fuenlabrada	1975	Fuenlabrada, Madrid	La Aldehuela
Langreo	1961	Langreo, Asturias	Ganzábal
Las Palmas	1949	Las Palmas, Canary Islands	Insular
Lugo	1953	Lugo, Galicia	Anxo Carro
Mensajero	1924	Santa Cruz de La Palma, Canary Islands	Silvestre Carrillo
Moscardó	1945	Usera, Madrid	Román Valero
Móstoles	1955	Móstoles, Madrid	El Soto
Real Oviedo B	1930	Oviedo, Asturias	Carlos Tartiere
Pontevedra	1941	Pontevedra, Galicia	Pasarón
Racing Ferrol	1919	Ferrol, Galicia	A Malata
Real Madrid C	1952	Madrid, Madrid	Ciudad Deportiva
Realejos	1949	Los Realejos, Canary Islands	Los Príncipes
San Sebastián de los Reyes	1971	San Sebastián de los Reyes, Madrid	Matapiñonera
Sporting Gijón B	1960	Gijón, Asturias	Mareo
Valladolid B	1942	Valladolid, Castile and León	Anexo José Zorrilla

=== League table ===
Pos	Team	Pld	W	D	L	GF	GA	GD	Pts	Qualification or relegation
1	Racing Ferrol	38	21	12	5	71	27	+44	54	Qualification for Play-Off
2	Mensajero	38	22	8	8	69	42	+27	52	Qualification for Play-Off
3	Las Palmas	38	23	5	10	81	38	+43	51	Qualification for Play-Off
4	Pontevedra	38	20	8	10	51	30	+21	48	Qualification for Play-Off
5	Sporting Gijón B	38	20	5	13	50	43	+7	45	
6	SS Reyes	38	16	11	11	45	39	+6	43	
7	Moscardó	38	15	11	12	40	35	+5	41	
8	Langreo	38	16	8	14	40	43	−3	40	
9	Atlético Madrid B	38	17	6	15	50	45	+5	40	
10	Real Avilés	38	14	11	13	54	42	+12	39	
11	Lugo	38	14	8	16	49	57	−8	36	
12	Móstoles	38	13	9	16	33	51	−18	35	
13	Real Madrid C	38	12	10	16	60	57	+3	34	
14	Aranjuez	38	10	13	15	42	52	−10	33	
15	Valladolid B	38	10	11	17	54	57	−3	31	
16	Fuenlabrada	38	14	3	21	52	64	−12	31	Qualification for Play-out
17	Real Oviedo B	38	9	13	16	50	63	−13	31	Relegation to 1995–96 Tercera División
18	Real Ávila	38	12	6	20	39	66	−27	30	Relegation to 1995–96 Tercera División
19	Corralejo	38	9	8	21	28	64	−36	26	Relegation to 1995–96 Tercera División
20	Realejos	38	7	6	25	32	75	−43	20	Relegation to 1995–96 Tercera División

Source: BDFútbol
Rules for classification: 1) points; 2) head-to-head points; 3) head-to-head goal difference; 4) head-to-head goals scored; 5) goal difference; 6) number of goals scored.

=== Results ===
Home \ Away	ARA	ATL	AVA	AVS	COR	FUE	LNG	LPA	LUG	MEN	MSC	MST	OVI	PNT	RFE	RMC	RLJ	SSR	SPG	VLD
Aranjuez	—	4–0	3–3	1–1	2–0	0–1	1–0	0–5	5–0	1–0	0–0	2–0	0–0	1–0	1–2	0–3	1–1	2–2	0–2	1–1
Atlético Madrid B	2–0	—	3–0	1–0	7–1	1–0	0–1	3–2	3–1	0–2	0–1	0–2	2–2	0–1	0–0	4–1	2–0	3–1	1–1	1–2
Real Ávila	2–1	0–1	—	0–0	1–0	2–1	0–1	3–1	1–1	0–0	0–1	2–0	5–1	0–1	0–0	3–2	1–0	0–1	0–1	2–1
Real Avilés Ind.	2–0	2–4	1–0	—	5–0	2–3	1–1	1–1	3–1	3–0	0–1	0–1	0–0	4–2	1–2	1–1	5–0	3–1	2–1	3–0
Corralejo	3–3	0–0	0–2	4–0	—	3–0	1–0	0–1	3–0	0–2	0–1	0–1	2–1	1–1	0–0	2–1	1–0	0–0	1–0	1–0
Fuenlabrada	1–3	3–0	3–0	1–0	3–0	—	4–2	0–2	1–0	0–3	1–3	0–1	2–3	4–2	0–1	1–3	3–1	1–1	1–2	4–2
Langreo	0–1	2–0	3–2	1–0	5–1	1–0	—	1–0	1–1	1–2	0–1	1–0	1–1	1–1	0–0	4–0	2–0	2–0	1–0	1–0
Las Palmas	2–0	2–1	6–1	0–1	2–0	4–1	3–1	—	4–2	4–1	1–1	3–0	6–3	0–2	3–0	3–3	3–2	0–1	3–0	4–0
Lugo	2–0	2–0	3–1	2–1	0–0	3–3	2–0	0–2	—	2–0	1–0	5–0	3–1	0–1	2–1	3–3	2–1	2–3	2–0	1–1
Mensajero	2–1	3–2	3–1	0–0	2–0	5–1	2–1	1–1	2–1	—	1–0	5–0	3–0	2–0	3–2	0–1	3–2	0–0	5–0	2–2
Moscardó	1–1	0–2	2–0	1–1	0–0	1–0	1–1	0–1	1–0	2–3	—	0–0	2–0	2–0	1–1	0–1	4–0	1–0	4–0	3–3
Móstoles	4–2	1–3	0–1	0–3	2–1	0–0	1–0	3–1	1–0	1–1	1–0	—	3–0	1–2	0–0	0–0	5–1	1–2	0–0	1–0
Real Oviedo B	0–0	0–1	5–0	2–2	0–0	1–2	2–2	2–1	1–0	2–2	2–2	0–0	—	0–2	1–1	4–2	8–1	0–2	2–1	0–4
Pontevedra	2–2	3–1	5–0	0–0	4–0	1–0	1–0	2–0	3–1	0–1	1–0	2–0	1–1	—	2–0	0–1	2–0	0–0	0–1	2–2
Racing Ferrol	3–0	3–0	4–1	3–1	2–0	2–0	0–1	1–1	5–0	3–0	4–0	4–1	3–1	2–0	—	5–0	2–0	2–2	2–1	4–2
Real Madrid C	0–0	0–0	3–2	0–1	6–1	1–2	7–0	0–3	0–2	1–2	3–0	2–0	1–2	0–0	0–0	—	4–0	0–2	3–3	1–3
Realejos	0–1	0–1	1–2	4–1	2–0	4–1	2–0	0–2	1–1	1–2	0–2	0–0	2–1	1–3	1–1	1–0	—	0–0	1–0	1–3
SS Reyes	3–1	2–0	4–0	0–0	4–1	0–2	0–0	0–2	0–1	2–1	1–1	3–1	1–0	0–1	0–0	0–4	2–0	—	1–2	2–1
Sporting Gijón B	1–0	0–0	2–0	1–0	2–1	2–1	0–1	1–0	4–0	3–2	3–0	4–0	1–0	1–0	0–3	2–1	1–1	1–2	—	4–1
Valladolid B	1–1	0–1	1–1	2–3	2–0	2–1	5–0	0–2	0–0	1–1	2–0	1–1	0–1	0–1	1–3	1–1	3–0	3–0	1–2	—

Source: BDFútbol
Legend: Blue = home team win; Yellow = draw; Red = away team win.

=== Top goalscorers ===
Goalscorers	Goals	Team
(Spain) Javi Prendes	24	Real Avilés
(Spain) Rafa Rodríguez	18	Mensajero
(Spain) Eduardo Ramos	17	Las Palmas
(Spain) Marcos Sequeiros	17	Sporting de Gijón B
(Spain) Miguel Puente	16	Mensajero

=== Top goalkeepers ===
Goalkeeper	Goals	Matches	Average	Team
(Spain) Luis César Sampedro	27	38	0.71	Racing de Ferrol
(Spain) Lino Fervenza	26	33	0.79	Pontevedra
(Spain) Juanjo González	24	30	0.8	Sporting de Gijón B
(Spain) Manolo López	29	32	0.91	Las Palmas
(Spain) Juan José Rojas	35	38	0.92	Moscardó

== Group II ==
Teams from Aragon, Basque Country, Cantabria, Castile and Leon, Navarre and La Rioja.

=== Teams ===
Location of teams in Segunda División B Gr. 2 1994–95

Team	Founded	Home city	Stadium
Alavés	1921	Vitoria-Gasteiz, Basque Country	Mendizorroza
Amurrio	1949	Amurrio, Basque Country	Basarte
Barakaldo	1917	Barakaldo, Basque Country	Lasesarre
Beasain	1905	Beasain, Basque Country	Loinaz
Bermeo	1950	Bermeo, Basque Country	Itxas Gane
Casetas	1922	Casetas, Aragon	San Miguel
Gernika	1922	Guernica, Basque Country	Urbieta
Gimnástica de Torrelavega	1907	Torrelavega, Cantabria	El Malecón
Hullera Vasco-Leonesa	1950	La Pola de Gordón, Castile and León	Santa Bárbara
Izarra	1924	Estella-Lizarra, Navarre	Merkatondoa
Lemona	1923	Lemoa, Basque Country	Arlonagusia
Logroñés B	1950	Logroño, La Rioja	Las Gaunas
Numancia	1945	Soria, Castile and León	Los Pajaritos
Osasuna B	1962	Aranguren, Navarre	Tajonar
Palencia	1975	Palencia, Castile and León	La Balastera
Real Sociedad B	1951	San Sebastián, Basque Country	Anoeta
Real Unión	1915	Irun, Basque Country	Stadium Gal
Sestao	1916	Sestao, Basque Country	Las Llanas
Tudelano	1935	Tudela, Navarre	Ciudad de Tudela
Zaragoza B	1958	Zaragoza, Aragon	Ciudad Deportiva del Real Zaragoza

=== League Table ===
Pos	Team	Pld	W	D	L	GF	GA	GD	Pts	Qualification or relegation
1	Alavés	38	27	7	4	92	26	+66	61	Qualification for Play-Off
2	Numancia	38	22	11	5	61	19	+42	55	Qualification for Play-Off
3	Sestao	38	21	7	10	56	26	+30	49	Qualification for Play-Off
4	Beasain	38	15	16	7	44	28	+16	46	Qualification for Play-Off
5	Real Unión	38	18	9	11	51	36	+15	45	
6	Osasuna B	38	18	8	12	47	43	+4	44	
7	Izarra	38	13	16	9	35	23	+12	42	
8	Lemona	38	14	10	14	40	51	−11	38	
9	Palencia	38	10	16	12	36	46	−10	36	
10	Real Sociedad B	38	12	11	15	29	38	−9	35	
11	Amurrio	38	7	20	11	34	44	−10	34	
12	Logroñés B	38	12	9	17	42	54	−12	33	
13	Barakaldo	38	13	7	18	46	50	−4	33	
14	Bermeo	38	11	11	16	35	50	−15	33	
15	Tudelano	38	10	13	15	37	45	−8	33	
16	Casetas	38	10	12	16	48	57	−9	32	Qualification for Play-out
17	Gimnástica de Torrelavega	38	12	8	18	39	46	−7	32	Relegation to 1995–96 Tercera División
18	Zaragoza B	38	11	9	18	39	52	−13	31	Relegation to 1995–96 Tercera División
19	Gernika	38	10	11	17	34	49	−15	31	Relegation to 1995–96 Tercera División
20	Hullera Vasco-Leonesa	38	4	9	25	24	86	−62	17	Relegation to 1995–96 Tercera División

Source: BDFútbol
Rules for classification: 1) points; 2) head-to-head points; 3) head-to-head goal difference; 4) head-to-head goals scored; 5) goal difference; 6) number of goals scored.

=== Results ===
Home \ Away	ALV	AMU	BAR	BEA	BER	CAS	GER	GIM	HUL	IZA	LEM	LOG	NUM	OSA	PAL	RSO	RUN	SES	TUD	ZAR
Alavés	—	5–0	3–0	1–1	5–3	5–0	3–0	1–0	2–0	0–0	2–3	3–0	0–0	5–1	4–0	5–1	8–5	2–0	0–0	4–0
Amurrio	0–0	—	0–2	1–1	0–0	2–2	0–1	0–0	5–0	0–2	2–2	1–0	0–5	2–2	1–1	1–2	0–3	0–1	2–2	0–0
Barakaldo	0–1	0–0	—	2–0	2–1	1–0	2–2	3–2	6–0	1–1	5–1	5–2	0–3	0–1	1–0	0–1	1–0	1–0	0–1	3–1
Beasain	1–1	0–0	4–1	—	1–1	2–0	2–0	0–0	1–0	0–0	1–1	2–0	3–1	3–0	1–1	1–0	1–1	1–0	0–2	3–0
Bermeo	1–4	1–1	2–1	0–0	—	1–1	0–0	2–3	2–0	0–0	0–1	0–2	0–2	2–0	0–0	1–0	1–0	2–1	3–0	0–4
Casetas	0–2	3–5	2–1	1–0	2–4	—	0–1	5–0	3–1	1–1	1–2	1–1	2–0	1–2	1–1	1–1	2–3	0–0	2–1	4–2
Gernika	1–3	0–0	1–1	0–2	3–0	0–0	—	3–0	3–0	1–3	0–1	1–1	0–1	1–3	2–1	0–0	1–0	1–2	2–1	1–2
Gimn. Torrelavega	0–2	1–1	1–0	0–2	0–1	4–0	3–1	—	3–1	2–2	2–0	3–1	0–0	3–1	4–0	1–0	3–0	0–1	0–1	0–0
Hullera VL	0–4	1–1	1–0	0–1	1–1	0–2	2–0	1–1	—	0–1	1–1	1–1	2–4	0–3	1–1	1–0	1–1	1–1	0–0	0–2
Izarra	1–0	0–1	1–0	2–0	4–0	1–0	1–1	0–0	4–0	—	0–1	1–1	0–0	0–0	1–0	2–0	0–1	1–0	0–3	2–0
Lemona	0–4	0–1	0–0	1–1	0–1	4–2	1–2	2–0	4–2	0–0	—	1–0	1–5	1–0	0–2	0–0	1–2	1–0	2–2	0–1
Logroñés B	1–2	1–0	2–1	1–1	0–0	0–0	1–2	2–0	1–0	1–0	2–1	—	0–0	2–4	2–3	1–0	0–3	3–1	1–0	2–0
Numancia	2–0	0–1	3–1	1–0	0–0	0–0	1–1	5–0	4–0	2–0	3–1	1–0	—	2–0	1–0	1–0	0–0	2–0	2–1	1–1
Osasuna B	0–2	0–0	3–1	1–1	2–1	2–0	1–0	1–0	3–0	3–2	0–2	1–0	2–1	—	3–0	1–0	1–2	2–4	1–0	0–1
Palencia	2–2	1–1	0–0	1–2	0–3	1–0	3–0	2–1	4–1	0–0	1–1	2–0	0–0	1–1	—	1–0	1–1	0–2	1–1	2–1
Real Sociedad B	0–2	2–1	3–1	1–1	2–0	1–4	0–0	1–0	2–1	1–0	0–0	3–3	0–0	0–0	2–0	—	0–3	1–1	0–0	1–0
Real Unión	0–1	1–1	1–0	2–0	1–0	0–0	2–1	0–1	6–1	2–1	0–1	3–1	0–1	0–0	0–1	1–0	—	1–0	2–2	2–0
Sestao	3–1	1–0	5–1	0–0	3–0	3–1	3–0	1–0	3–0	1–1	3–0	3–0	1–0	2–0	3–0	2–0	2–0	—	1–0	0–0
Tudelano	0–2	1–1	0–1	4–3	2–0	1–1	3–1	1–0	1–2	0–0	2–0	1–5	1–2	0–0	0–0	1–3	1–1	1–0	—	0–2
Zaragoza B	0–1	0–2	1–1	0–1	2–1	1–3	0–0	2–1	4–1	0–0	1–2	3–1	1–5	1–2	2–2	0–1	0–1	2–2	2–0	—

Source: BDFútbol
Legend: Blue = home team win; Yellow = draw; Red = away team win.

=== Top goalscorers ===
Goalscorers	Goals	Team
(Spain) Santi Castillejo	21	Alavés
(Spain) Brasi	19	Numancia
(Spain) Aitor Bouzo	16	Sestao
(Spain) Juan Carlos Lasheras	15	Alavés
(Spain) José Manuel Molinero	15	Palencia

=== Top goalkeepers ===
Goalkeeper	Goals	Matches	Average	Team
(Spain) Laureano Echevarría	16	35	0.46	Numancia
(Spain) Alfonso Núñez	21	37	0.57	Izarra
(Spain) Tito Subero	19	30	0.63	Alavés
(Spain) Javier Elola	28	38	0.74	Beasain
(Spain) Iñigo Arteaga	37	37	1	Real Sociedad B

== Group III ==
Teams from Andorra, Catalonia, Region of Murcia and Valencian Community

=== Teams ===
Location of teams in Segunda División B Gr. 3 1994–95

Team	Founded	Home city	Stadium
Alcoyano	1928	Alcoy, Valencian Community	El Collao
FC Andorra	1942	Andorra la Vella, Andorra	Comunal
Benidorm	1964	Benidorm, Valencian Community	Foietes
Castellón	1922	Castellón de la Plana, Valencian Community	Nou Castàlia
Elche	1923	Elche, Valencian Community	Martínez Valero
Europa	1907	Barcelona, Catalonia	Feliu i Codina
Figueres	1919	Figueres, Catalonia	Vilatenim
Gimnàstic de Tarragona	1886	Tarragona, Catalonia	Nou Estadi Tarragona
Girona	1930	Girona, Catalonia	Montilivi
Gramenet	1994	Santa Coloma de Gramenet, Catalonia	Nou Camp Municipal
Hospitalet	1957	L'Hospitalet de Llobregat, Catalonia	Municipal de Deportes
Levante	1909	Valencia, Valencian Community	Nou Estadi Llevant
Manlleu	1933	Manlleu, Catalonia	Municipal
Murcia	1908	Murcia, Region of Murcia	La Condomina
Ontinyent	1931	Ontinyent, Valencian Community	El Clariano
Premià	1915	Premià de Mar, Catalonia	Municipal
Sabadell	1903	Sabadell, Catalonia	Nova Creu Alta
Sant Andreu	1909	Barcelona, Catalonia	Narcís Sala
Terrassa	1906	Terrassa, Catalonia	Olímpic de Terrassa
Valencia B	1944	Valencia, Valencian Community	Ciudad Deportiva de Paterna

=== League Table ===
Pos	Team	Pld	W	D	L	GF	GA	GD	Pts	Qualification or relegation
1	Levante	38	22	10	6	55	27	+28	54	Qualification for Play-Off
2	Gramenet	38	21	8	9	73	31	+42	50	Qualification for Play-Off
3	Valencia Mestalla	38	21	8	9	61	36	+25	50	Qualification for Play-Off
4	Castellón	38	20	8	10	62	33	+29	48	Qualification for Play-Off
5	Manlleu	38	17	12	9	47	37	+10	46	
6	Elche	38	17	12	9	60	37	+23	46	
7	FC Andorra	38	13	16	9	32	31	+1	42	
8	Alcoyano	38	13	14	11	44	37	+7	40	
9	Figueres	38	14	11	13	44	40	+4	39	
10	Ontinyent	38	14	9	15	45	50	−5	37	
11	Sabadell	38	13	11	14	50	68	−18	37	
12	L'Hospitalet	38	10	16	12	48	58	−10	36	
13	Terrassa	38	13	10	15	41	50	−9	36	
14	Benidorm	38	10	17	11	30	36	−6	35 (Note: Benidorm was docked 2 points for illegal lineup.)	
15	Sant Andreu	38	11	11	16	52	47	+5	33	
16	Gimnàstic	38	9	15	14	45	45	0	33	Qualification for Play-out
17	Murcia	38	11	11	16	43	47	−4	33	Relegation to 1995–96 Tercera División
18	Girona	38	6	10	22	38	72	−34	22	Relegation to 1995–96 Tercera División
19	Europa	38	7	7	24	31	67	−36	21	Relegation to 1995–96 Tercera División
20	Premià	38	7	6	25	33	85	−52	20	Relegation to 1995–96 Tercera División

Source: BDFútbol
Rules for classification: 1) points; 2) head-to-head points; 3) head-to-head goal difference; 4) head-to-head goals scored; 5) goal difference; 6) number of goals scored.

=== Results ===
Home \ Away	ALC	AND	BEN	CAS	ELC	EUR	FIG	GIM	GIR	GRA	HOS	LEV	MAN	MUR	ONT	PRE	SAB	SAN	TER	VAL
Alcoyano	—	1–0	3–0	1–1	0–3	3–0	1–0	1–0	1–1	0–1	4–0	2–2	4–0	1–0	1–0	0–0	3–1	2–1	0–1	1–2
FC Andorra	0–0	—	1–0	1–0	1–1	1–0	0–0	1–1	3–0	1–1	1–1	1–2	1–0	2–1	1–3	1–0	1–1	1–0	1–1	1–0
Benidorm	0–0	1–0	—	0–4	0–0	1–1	0–0	0–0	2–1	0–2	1–1	0–0	1–1	0–0	0–1	2–0	2–0	2–1	0–0	0–0
Castellón	0–0	2–0	1–1	—	0–1	1–0	0–0	0–2	5–0	0–2	1–1	2–1	3–1	4–1	2–0	2–0	2–0	2–0	2–0	0–2
Elche	1–1	0–0	1–0	1–2	—	1–0	1–0	2–0	2–0	2–0	3–0	0–0	1–1	1–0	0–0	5–0	6–2	2–1	1–3	2–2
Europa	0–0	0–1	3–1	0–1	2–3	—	0–1	1–5	2–1	0–5	0–2	0–2	1–1	0–2	2–3	2–0	0–1	0–0	4–1	3–1
Figueres	2–0	1–0	1–2	4–1	0–3	2–0	—	2–1	1–1	4–0	0–0	1–3	1–0	1–0	2–0	4–2	0–0	3–3	0–4	1–2
Gimnàstic	1–2	1–1	1–1	1–1	0–0	1–2	0–0	—	5–0	1–1	1–1	0–3	0–0	1–1	0–3	1–0	2–0	2–2	5–0	0–1
Girona	2–0	1–1	0–0	1–3	2–3	4–0	3–2	0–0	—	0–1	2–2	0–1	1–2	0–4	0–5	2–0	1–1	3–1	2–0	0–2
Gramenet	3–1	0–0	2–1	0–1	6–0	4–1	1–1	0–0	2–1	—	6–1	0–1	1–2	1–1	5–1	2–0	6–0	2–0	3–0	1–0
Hospitalet	3–2	5–1	1–3	1–4	1–1	2–1	3–2	2–0	4–1	1–0	—	0–1	0–1	1–1	1–1	2–1	1–2	2–2	1–1	1–3
Levante	0–0	0–0	1–0	1–2	2–1	1–1	1–0	4–1	2–2	1–0	2–2	—	0–1	2–0	1–1	0–1	3–0	1–0	1–0	2–1
Manlleu	1–1	2–0	1–2	0–0	1–0	0–0	2–0	0–1	2–0	1–0	0–0	1–3	—	1–0	1–0	2–0	4–2	1–0	1–0	3–1
Murcia	3–2	0–1	2–0	1–1	2–2	2–1	1–1	1–4	0–0	1–0	3–1	1–0	0–0	—	2–1	6–1	1–5	0–0	2–0	1–2
Ontinyent	2–0	0–2	1–2	0–4	2–0	3–2	0–0	1–1	2–1	1–2	1–1	0–1	2–2	2–1	—	2–1	1–1	1–0	1–0	0–1
Premià	1–1	2–3	2–3	3–2	0–7	0–1	0–2	2–1	2–1	2–6	1–1	1–3	1–2	1–1	1–0	—	2–1	2–2	2–2	2–1
Sabadell	3–2	0–0	0–0	2–1	1–0	0–0	3–2	2–3	4–2	1–1	2–0	3–3	3–2	3–1	1–1	2–0	—	1–0	1–2	1–1
Sant Andreu	0–1	1–1	1–1	1–0	1–0	3–0	0–1	2–0	1–1	1–3	0–0	1–2	4–3	1–0	4–1	5–0	7–0	—	2–1	2–0
Terrassa	1–1	1–1	2–1	2–1	1–1	2–1	0–1	1–0	1–0	1–3	1–2	0–2	2–2	1–0	1–2	2–0	1–0	2–2	—	3–1
Valencia B	1–1	1–0	0–0	1–4	3–2	5–0	2–1	4–2	3–1	0–0	1–0	1–0	1–1	2–0	3–0	3–0	4–0	3–0	0–0	—

Source: BDFútbol
Legend: Blue = home team win; Yellow = draw; Red = away team win.

=== Top goalscorers ===
Goalscorers	Goals	Team
(Spain) José Luis Garzón	24	Sabadell
(Spain) Antonio Barnils	17	Manlleu
(Spain) David Caneda	14	Castellón
(Spain) José Antonio Córcoles	14	Castellón
(Spain) Rodri	14	Elche

=== Top goalkeepers ===
Goalkeeper	Goals	Matches	Average	Team
(Spain) Rodri	17	29	0.59	Levante
(Spain) Rafa Gómez	21	30	0.7	Valencia Mestalla
(Spain) Juan Manuel López	28	36	0.78	Gramenet
(Spain) Iru	25	32	0.78	Elche
(Spain) Vicente Roca	30	34	0.88	Manlleu

== Group IV ==
Teams from Andalusia, Castilla–La Mancha, Extremadura, Melilla and Region of Murcia.

=== Teams ===
Location of teams in Segunda División B Gr. 4 1994–95

Team	Founded	Home city	Stadium
Almería CF	1989	Almería, Andalusia	Juan Rojas
Polideportivo Almería	1983	Almería, Andalusia	Juan Rojas
Betis B	1962	Seville, Andalusia	Benito Villamarín
Cádiz	1910	Cádiz, Andalusia	Ramón de Carranza
Cacereño	1919	Cáceres, Extremadura	Príncipe Felipe
Cartagena FC	1940	Cartagena, Region of Murcia	Cartagonova
Córdoba	1954	Córdoba, Andalusia	Nuevo Arcángel
Écija Balompié	1939	Écija, Andalusia	San Pablo
Granada	1931	Granada, Andalusia	Los Cármenes
Real Jaén	1929	Jaén, Andalusia	La Victoria
Manchego	1929	Ciudad Real, Castilla-La Mancha	Príncipe Juan Carlos
Mármol Macael	1952	Macael, Andalusia	Ciudad Deportiva de Macael
Melilla	1976	Melilla	Álvarez Claro
Recreativo de Huelva	1889	Huelva, Andalusia	Colombino
San Fernando	1940	San Fernando, Andalusia	Bahía Sur
San Roque de Lepe	1956	Lepe, Andalusia	Municipal de Deportes
Sevilla B	1950	Seville, Andalusia	Viejo Nervión
Talavera	1948	Talavera de la Reina, Castilla–La Mancha	El Prado
Xerez	1947	Jerez de la Frontera, Andalusia	Chapín
Yeclano	1950	Yecla, Region of Murcia	La Constitución

=== League Table ===
Pos	Team	Pld	W	D	L	GF	GA	GD	Pts	Qualification or relegation
1	Córdoba	38	21	12	5	57	28	+29	54	Qualification for Play-Off
2	Almería	38	23	6	9	69	31	+38	52	Qualification for Play-Off
3	Écija	38	17	15	6	47	31	+16	49	Qualification for Play-Off
4	Jaén	38	18	11	9	56	34	+22	47	Qualification for Play-Off
5	Talavera	38	15	16	7	47	35	+12	46	
6	Yeclano	38	20	6	12	58	39	+19	46	
7	Sevilla Atlético	38	18	8	12	54	33	+21	44	
8	Mármol Macael	38	13	13	12	39	49	−10	39	
9	Xerez	38	14	10	14	36	44	−8	38	
10	Cádiz	38	14	10	14	45	46	−1	38	
11	Betis B	38	14	9	15	44	41	+3	37	
12	Melilla	38	9	18	11	31	35	−4	36	
13	Granada	38	11	13	14	50	56	−6	35	
14	Recreativo	38	11	12	15	43	50	−7	34	
15	Polideportivo Almería	38	10	14	14	41	50	−9	34	
16	Cartagena FC	38	11	11	16	46	52	−6	33	Qualification for Play-out
17	San Fernando	38	10	11	17	44	48	−4	31	Relegation to 1995–96 Tercera División
18	San Roque de Lepe	38	6	16	16	26	49	−23	28	Relegation to 1995–96 Tercera División
19	Cacereño	38	5	11	22	28	65	−37	21	Relegation to 1995–96 Tercera División
20	Manchego	38	3	12	23	16	61	−45	18	Relegation to 1995–96 Tercera División

Source: BDFútbol
Rules for classification: 1) points; 2) head-to-head points; 3) head-to-head goal difference; 4) head-to-head goals scored; 5) goal difference; 6) number of goals scored.

=== Results ===
Home \ Away	ALM	CPA	BET	CAD	CAC	CAR	COR	ECI	GRA	JAE	MAN	MAM	MEL	REC	SFE	SRL	SEV	TAL	XER	YEC
Almería CF	—	3–0	2–1	2–1	4–0	0–0	1–1	3–0	1–1	3–1	3–0	1–0	2–0	4–1	2–1	4–0	0–2	2–2	2–0	3–0
Poli Almería	0–1	—	0–2	1–1	1–1	2–1	2–2	0–1	3–1	1–6	0–0	2–0	1–1	2–2	2–0	1–2	0–1	0–0	2–0	2–1
Betis B	0–2	0–4	—	3–0	3–1	4–2	2–2	0–1	4–1	0–0	0–0	2–0	0–2	1–2	1–0	0–1	0–1	3–1	2–0	2–0
Cádiz	3–0	1–1	2–1	—	0–0	2–2	1–0	2–1	1–1	0–0	0–0	2–0	2–0	1–2	1–3	2–1	2–1	2–0	0–1	1–2
Cacereño	0–4	0–2	2–0	0–1	—	3–0	1–1	0–1	2–2	0–2	1–2	0–1	0–0	0–0	0–3	2–0	2–3	0–3	0–5	0–3
Cartagena FC	0–2	2–0	0–0	5–3	1–0	—	2–0	0–1	2–2	1–2	2–1	0–2	1–1	1–0	0–0	0–0	2–4	0–1	0–2	1–2
Córdoba	1–0	2–1	3–0	1–0	2–1	3–0	—	0–0	2–0	2–0	1–1	1–1	0–1	2–0	2–0	2–1	0–0	2–2	3–1	3–2
Écija	2–1	1–1	0–0	1–1	1–1	2–1	0–1	—	3–1	2–1	3–1	0–0	1–0	3–1	0–0	1–1	1–3	1–1	4–0	2–0
Granada	2–1	3–1	1–1	1–3	2–0	1–0	0–2	2–0	—	2–2	2–0	2–2	1–1	1–0	1–2	3–2	1–1	2–2	0–1	0–1
Jaén	1–1	1–1	2–0	1–0	2–0	0–0	1–0	1–2	1–1	—	2–0	6–0	0–1	1–2	2–0	1–0	1–0	1–2	2–1	1–1
Manchego	0–0	0–2	0–1	0–3	1–1	1–3	0–4	0–3	0–2	2–3	—	0–1	0–0	3–2	1–4	1–1	1–0	0–1	0–0	0–0
Mármol Macael	0–2	4–2	1–4	2–0	2–1	3–2	0–1	0–0	0–2	2–1	0–0	—	2–1	2–2	2–1	0–1	3–2	2–1	2–0	1–2
Melilla	3–1	1–2	1–1	2–0	1–1	1–1	0–0	2–2	1–0	0–1	1–1	1–1	—	0–2	1–1	2–0	0–1	0–0	1–0	1–0
Recreativo	2–4	2–0	1–1	0–0	1–1	0–2	0–1	2–3	4–1	2–2	1–0	0–0	2–1	—	1–0	1–1	2–1	1–1	1–2	0–1
San Fernando	0–2	0–0	0–1	1–1	1–1	0–2	2–2	0–0	3–2	3–4	4–0	4–0	2–0	1–0	—	2–1	1–2	1–1	1–2	1–5
San Roque de Lepe	1–3	1–1	2–1	0–1	1–2	0–3	1–1	0–0	0–0	0–0	1–0	1–1	1–1	0–0	2–1	—	0–0	0–0	0–0	0–2
Sevilla B	2–1	0–0	0–0	5–0	3–0	1–2	0–1	1–2	1–0	1–2	1–0	1–1	4–1	1–1	2–0	3–0	—	1–1	0–2	0–1
Talavera	1–0	2–0	2–3	3–2	4–1	2–2	0–1	2–1	1–0	1–0	1–0	0–0	1–1	3–1	0–0	1–1	0–1	—	1–1	2–1
Xerez	0–1	0–0	1–0	1–0	0–2	4–3	1–3	0–0	3–3	0–0	2–0	0–0	0–0	1–2	0–0	3–2	0–3	1–0	—	1–0
Yeclano	2–1	4–1	1–0	1–3	2–1	0–0	3–2	1–1	2–3	0–2	5–0	1–1	0–0	1–0	2–1	3–0	2–1	0–1	4–0	—

Source: BDFútbol
Legend: Blue = home team win; Yellow = draw; Red = away team win.

=== Top goalscorers ===
Goalscorers	Goals	Team
(Spain) Antonio Rueda	19	Jaén
(Spain) Juan Antonio Crespín	17	San Fernando
(Spain) Iván Rosado	16	Recreativo
(Spain) Rodri	15	Mármol Macael
(Spain) Manolo López	14	Córdoba

=== Top goalkeepers ===
Goalkeeper	Goals	Matches	Average	Team
(Spain) José Requena	17	29	0.59	Almería
(Spain) Juan Barbero	18	28	0.64	Écija
(Spain) Avelino Viña	25	37	0.68	Córdoba
(Spain) Manuel Ruiz	25	31	0.81	Almería
(Spain) Jaime Ferrer	31	37	0.84	Sevilla Atlético

== Play-offs ==
=== Group A ===
Pos	Team	Pld	W	D	L	GF	GA	GD	Pts	Promotion	SES	COR	CAS	MEN
1	Sestao Sport (P)	6	2	3	1	6	4	+2	7	Promotion to Segunda División		1–0	1–1	2–0
2	Córdoba CF	6	3	0	3	6	4	+2	6		1–0		2–0	3–1
3	CD Castellón	6	2	2	2	5	10	−5	6		1–1	1–0		1–0
4	CD Mensajero	6	2	1	3	9	8	+1	5		1–1	1–0	6–1	

Source: arquero-arba and futbolme
Rules for classification: 1st points; 2nd head-to-head points; 3rd head-to-head goal difference; 4th head-to-head goals scored; 5th goal difference; 6th number of goals scored
(P) Promoted

=== Group B ===
Pos	Team	Pld	W	D	L	GF	GA	GD	Pts	Promotion	ALM	VAL	RFE	BEA
1	Almería CF (P)	6	3	2	1	11	6	+5	8	Promotion to Segunda División		0–0	1–4	4–1
2	Valencia CF B	6	2	3	1	7	8	−1	7		0–3		2–1	3–2
3	Racing Ferrol	6	2	3	1	11	6	+5	7		1–1	1–1		1–1
4	SD Beasaín	6	0	2	4	5	14	−9	2		0–2	1–1	0–3	

Source: arquero-arba and futbolme
Rules for classification: 1st points; 2nd head-to-head points; 3rd head-to-head goal difference; 4th head-to-head goals scored; 5th goal difference; 6th number of goals scored
(P) Promoted

=== Group C ===
Pos	Team	Pld	W	D	L	GF	GA	GD	Pts	Promotion	ALV	LPA	GRA	JAE
1	Alavés (P)	6	4	1	1	12	6	+6	9	Promotion to Segunda División		2–1	4–0	3–1
2	UD Las Palmas	6	2	3	1	10	9	+1	7		1–1		2–1	3–2
3	UDA Gramenet	6	1	2	3	5	10	−5	4		0–1	2–2		1–1
4	Real Jaén	6	1	2	3	8	10	−2	4		3–1	1–1	0–1	

Source: arquero-arba and futbolme
Rules for classification: 1st points; 2nd head-to-head points; 3rd head-to-head goal difference; 4th head-to-head goals scored; 5th goal difference; 6th number of goals scored
(P) Promoted

=== Group D ===
Pos	Team	Pld	W	D	L	GF	GA	GD	Pts	Promotion	ECI	NUM	LEV	PNT
1	Écija Balompié (P)	6	2	3	1	6	5	+1	7	Promotion to Segunda División		0–0	1–1	1–0
2	CD Numancia	6	1	4	1	4	3	+1	6		0–0		1–1	2–0
3	Levante UD	6	1	4	1	7	8	−1	6		2–4	1–1		2–1
4	Pontevedra	6	2	1	3	4	5	−1	5		2–0	1–0	0–0	

Source: arquero-arba and futbolme
Rules for classification: 1st points; 2nd head-to-head points; 3rd head-to-head goal difference; 4th head-to-head goals scored; 5th goal difference; 6th number of goals scored
(P) Promoted

== Play-out ==
=== Semifinal ===
Team 1	Score	Team 2
Gimnàstic	1–2	Fuenlabrada
Casetas	0–1	Cartagena FC

=== Final ===
Team 1	Score	Team 2
Casetas	1–2	Gimnàstic
