= Pepín (footballer, born 1959) =

Spanish footballer

Personal information
- Full name: José Luis Salcedo Nieto
- Date of birth: 15 September 1959 (age 67)
- Place of birth: Aranjuez, Spain
- Height: 1.78 m (5 ft 10 in)
- Position: Defender

Youth career
- Aranjuez

Senior career*
Years	Team	Apps	(Gls)
1978–1983	Aranjuez		
1983–1987	Rayo Vallecano	107	(5)
1987–1994	Osasuna	247	(2)
1994–1995	Aranjuez	37	(4)
- * Club domestic league appearances and goals

José Luis Salcedo Nieto (born 15 September 1959), known as Pepín, is a Spanish retired footballer who played as a defender.

== Football career ==
Born in Aranjuez, Pepín played 275 official games for CA Osasuna over the course of seven La Liga seasons, having signed in the 1987 summer from local Community of Madrid side Rayo Vallecano.

He left the Navarrese at the end of the 1993–94 campaign, which ended in relegation, and, at the age of nearly 35, returned to his very first senior club Real Aranjuez CF in the lower leagues. With Osasuna, he also appeared in six complete matches in the 1991–92 UEFA Cup.
