= Lino Iyanga =

Equatoguinean footballer (born 1982)

Lino
Personal information
- Full name: Pedro Lino Iyanga Bama
- Date of birth: 15 June 1982 (age 44)
- Place of birth: Bata, Equatorial Guinea
- Height: 1.77 m (5 ft 10 in)
- Position: Right wing back

Senior career*
Years	Team	Apps	(Gls)
2005–2011	Internacional de Madrid	88+	(1+)
2010–2011	→ Colonia Moscardó (loan)	21	(0)
2011–2012	Coslada	17	(0)
2012–2015	Villaverde	67	(1)
2015–2016	Parla Escuela		
2016–2018	Fortuna		
2018–2019	Atlético Club de Socios		
2019–2020	Tres Cantos		

International career
2000	Equatorial Guinea	2	(0)
- * Club domestic league appearances and goals as of 30 March 2014

Pedro Lino Iyanga Bama (born 15 June 1982), known as Lino, is an Equatoguinean former footballer who played as a defender and developed most of his club career in the Community of Madrid, Spain. He capped for the Equatorial Guinea national team.

== Career ==
=== International career ===
Lino played for the Equatorial Guinea national team in the 2002 FIFA World Cup qualification (CAF).

=== Career statistics ===
Club	Season	League	
Club	Season	Apps	Goals
Internacional de Madrid	2005–06	?	?
Internacional de Madrid	2006–07	?	?
Internacional de Madrid	2007–08	28	0
Internacional de Madrid	2008–09	29	1
Internacional de Madrid	2009–10	31	0
Internacional de Madrid	Total	88+	1+
Colonia Moscardó	2010–11	21	0
Colonia Moscardó	Total	21	0
Coslada	2011–12	17	0
Coslada	Total	17	0
Villaverde	2012–13	11	0
Villaverde	2013–14	33	1
Villaverde	2014–15	23	0
Villaverde	Total	67	0
Parla Escuela	2015–16	1	0
Parla Escuela	Total	1	0
Career total		194+	2+
