= Yeclano Deportivo =

Association football club

Yeclano
- Full name: Yeclano Deportivo
- Founded: 2004
- Ground: La Constitución, Yecla, Murcia, Spain
- Capacity: 4,000
- President: Pedro Romero
- Head coach: Iván Martínez
- League: Segunda Federación – Group 3
- 2025–26: Segunda Federación – Group 4, 11th of 18
| Home colours | Away colours |

Yeclano Deportivo is a Spanish football team based in Yecla, in the autonomous community of Murcia. Founded in 2004 it currently plays in Segunda Federación – Group 3, holding home games at Estadio de La Constitución, which has a capacity of 4,000 spectators.

== History ==
Yeclano Deportivo was founded in 2004, after the disappearance of historical Yeclano Club de Fútbol. Pedro Romero with other local supporters became the founders of the new club from Yeclano. It first competed in the fourth division in 2006–07, being relocated to Group 13 in 2008. In the 2008-09 season the club was in the leading group, finally finished in the 4th position, just 7 points away from the champion.

In the 2009–10 season Yeclano finished in second position in its group, promoting to the third level for the first time in its history after disposing of CF Trival Valderas (5–3 on aggregate), UD Pájara Playas de Jandía (2–1) and Haro Deportivo (1–1, penalty shootout win) in the playoffs. The next season was difficult, as the club couldn't remain its place in the Segunda División B.

In the 2018–19 season the club won Tercera División, Group 13 and promoted to Segunda División B.

== Season to season ==
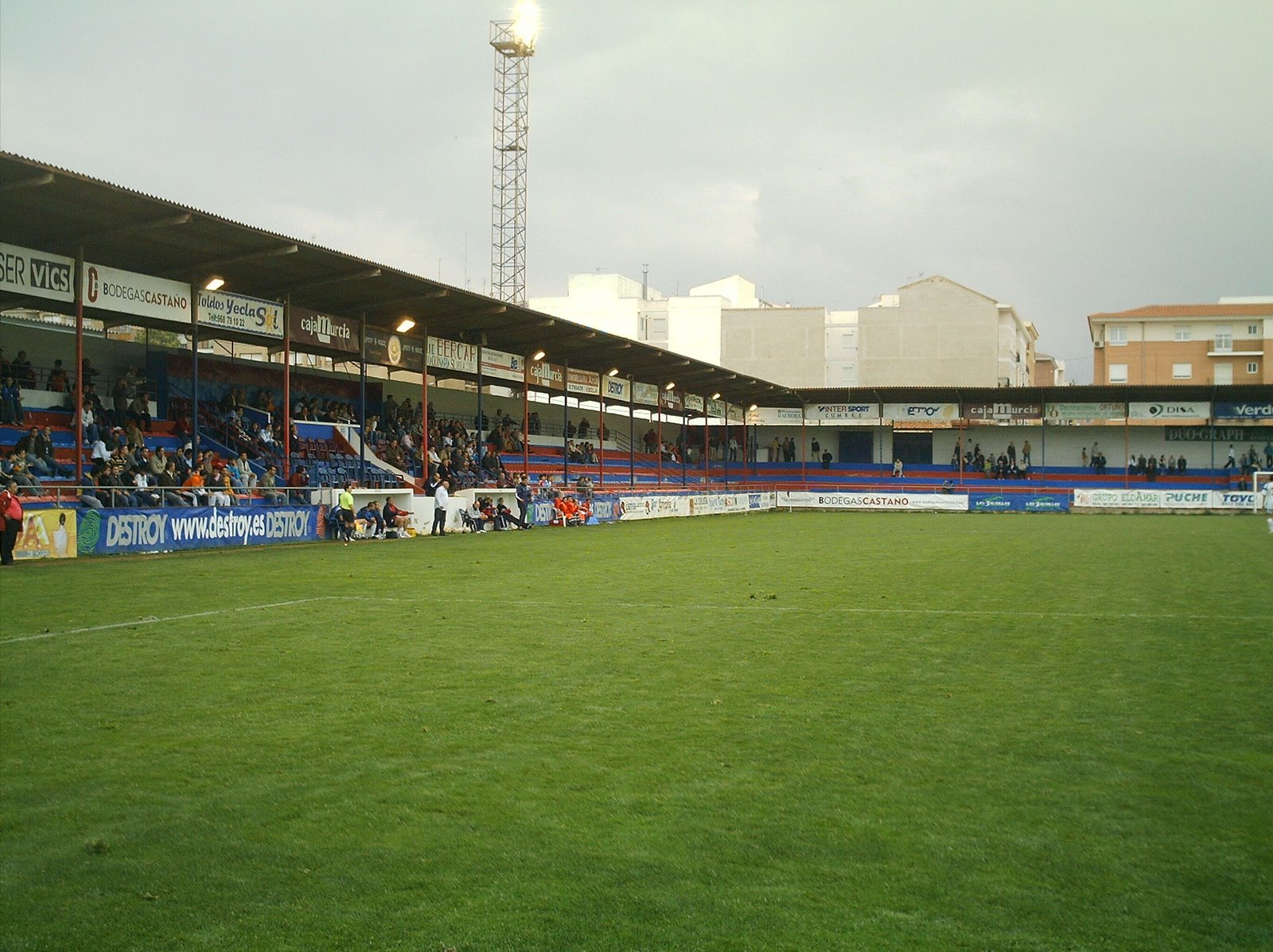
Estadio La Constitución

| Season | Tier | Division | Place | Copa del Rey |
|---|---|---|---|---|
| 2004–05 | 6 | 1ª Reg. | 1st | |
| 2005–06 | 5 | Terr. Pref. | 2nd | |
| 2006–07 | 4 | 3ª | 12th | |
| 2007–08 | 4 | 3ª | 12th | |
| 2008–09 | 4 | 3ª | 4th | |
| 2009–10 | 4 | 3ª | 2nd | |
| 2010–11 | 3 | 2ª B | 19th | |
| 2011–12 | 4 | 3ª | 1st | |
| 2012–13 | 3 | 2ª B | 20th | First round |
| 2013–14 | 4 | 3ª | 2nd | |
| 2014–15 | 4 | 3ª | 6th | |
| 2015–16 | 4 | 3ª | 5th | |
| 2016–17 | 4 | 3ª | 5th | |
| 2017–18 | 4 | 3ª | 1st | |
| 2018–19 | 4 | 3ª | 1st | First round |
| 2019–20 | 3 | 2ª B | 4th | Second round |
| 2020–21 | 3 | 2ª B | 9th / 5th | Second round |
| 2021–22 | 5 | 3ª RFEF | 1st | |
| 2022–23 | 4 | 2ª Fed. | 6th | First round |
| 2023–24 | 4 | 2ª Fed. | 2nd | Second round |

| Season | Tier | Division | Place | Copa del Rey |
|---|---|---|---|---|
| 2024–25 | 3 | 1ª Fed. | 17th | Second round |
| 2025–26 | 4 | 2ª Fed. | 11th | |
| 2026–27 | 4 | 2ª Fed. | | |

- 1 season in Primera Federación
- 3 seasons in Segunda División B
- 4 seasons in Segunda Federación
- 11 seasons in Tercera División
- 1 season in Tercera División RFEF

== Honours ==
- Tercera División: 2011–12, 2017–18

== Current squad ==
As of 8 February 2026

Note: Flags indicate national team as defined under FIFA eligibility rules; some limited exceptions apply. Players may hold more than one non-FIFA nationality.

| No. | Pos. | Nation | Player |
|---|---|---|---|
| 1 | GK | ESP | Guillermo Acín (on loan from Zaragoza) |
| 3 | DF | ESP | Jordan Hernández |
| 4 | DF | ESP | Pedro Melli |
| 5 | MF | ESP | Unai Rementería |
| 6 | DF | ESP | Carlos Peñaranda |
| 7 | FW | ESP | Jorge de Vicente |
| 8 | MF | ESP | Totti |
| 9 | FW | ESP | Antonio Hernández |
| 10 | MF | ESP | Sergio Carrasco |
| 11 | FW | ESP | Jorge Domínguez |
| 13 | GK | ESP | Borja Martí |
| 14 | MF | ESP | Javi Tudela |

| No. | Pos. | Nation | Player |
|---|---|---|---|
| 15 | DF | ESP | Nani |
| 16 | MF | AND | Ot Remolins |
| 17 | DF | ESP | Asier Seijo |
| 19 | FW | CMR | Stephane Emaná |
| 20 | FW | ESP | Jaime Fernández (on loan from Villarreal) |
| 21 | DF | VEN | Jorge Borao |
| 22 | MF | ESP | Toni Jou |
| 23 | FW | ESP | Jorge Borona |
| 24 | DF | ESP | Josema Gómez |
| 30 | DF | ESP | Iker Navarro |
| — | MF | ESP | Alejandro Puri |

== Famous players ==
- (Spain) Javi Moreno

== See also ==
- Yeclano Deportivo B, reserve team
