= Lalo Arantegui =

Spanish footballer

Lalo
Personal information
- Full name: Gonzalo Arantegui Peñafiel
- Date of birth: 12 June 1977 (age 49)
- Place of birth: Zaragoza, Spain
- Height: 1.80 m (5 ft 11 in)
- Position: Winger

Youth career
- Zaragoza
- Casetas

Senior career*
Years	Team	Apps	(Gls)
1994–1996	Casetas	24	(2)
1996–1998	Zaragoza B	56	(12)
1998–1999	Levante	10	(0)
1999–2000	Águilas	12	(0)
2000	Gandía	14	(1)
2000–2001	Jerez	32	(4)
2001–2002	Sevilla B	26	(3)
2002–2003	Binéfar	35	(13)
2003–2006	Conquense	91	(7)
2006–2007	Cultural Leonesa	33	(2)
2007–2009	Huesca	42	(10)
2009	Águilas	13	(2)
2009–2010	Estepona	19	(1)
2010–2011	Ejea	30	(5)
Total		407	(57)

International career
1998	Aragon		
- * Club domestic league appearances and goals

Gonzalo Arantegui Peñafiel (born 12 June 1977), commonly known as Lalo, is a Spanish retired footballer who played as a right winger, and a director of football.

== Playing career ==
Born in Zaragoza, Aragon, Lalo made his senior debut at the age of just 17 with UD Casetas, in Segunda División B. In 1996 he moved to Real Zaragoza, being assigned to the reserves also in the third division.

Lalo subsequently resumed his career mostly in the division three, representing Levante UD, Águilas CF (two stints), CF Gandía, Jerez CF, Sevilla Atlético, CD Binéfar (where he scored a career-best 13 goals in 2002–03), UB Conquense, Cultural y Deportiva Leonesa, SD Huesca and Unión Estepona CF. His professional inputs consisted of six Segunda División appearances with Huesca in the 2008–09 campaign, with his debut occurring on 31 August 2008 in a 2–2 home draw against CD Castellón.

In 2011, after one season at Tercera División side SD Ejea, Lalo retired at the age of 34.

== Post-playing career ==
Immediately after retiring, Lalo started working as a director of football in his last club Ejea. He left the club in the following year to join another club he represented as a player, Zaragoza, as a scout.

In August 2015, after one year as a scout at Villarreal CF, Lalo joined Huesca, another former side, as a director of football. On 28 February 2017, he returned to Zaragoza under the same role.
