= CA Monzalbarba =

Association football club in Spain

Atlético Monzalbarba
- Full name: Club Atlético Monzalbarba
- Founded: 1942
- Ground: La Manzanera, Monzalbarba, Zaragoza, Aragon, Spain
- Capacity: 1,000
- President: Antonio Carabantes
- Head coach: Santi Latorre
- League: Segunda Regional – Group 1
- 2024–25: Segunda Regional – Group 1, 15th of 18
Home colours	Away colours

Club Atlético Monzalbarba is a Spanish football team based in Monzalbarba, Zaragoza, in the autonomous community of Aragon. Founded in 1942, they play in Segunda Regional – Group 1, holding home games at Campo de Fútbol La Manzanera, with a capacity of 1,000 people.

In the 1990s, the club acted as a farm team of Real Zaragoza.

== Season to season ==
Season	Tier	Division	Place	Copa del Rey
1946–47	6	3ª Reg.	1st	
1947–48	5	2ª Reg.	2nd	
1948–49	5	2ª Reg.	7th	
1949–50	5	2ª Reg.	3rd	
1950–51	5	2ª Reg.	3rd	
1951–52	5	2ª Reg.	6th	
1952–53	5	2ª Reg.	(R)	
1953–54	5	2ª Reg.	3rd	
1954–55	5	2ª Reg.	(R)	
1955–1962	DNP			
1962–63	5	3ª Reg.	2nd	
1963–64	5	3ª Reg.	2nd	
1964–65	5	3ª Reg.	(R)	
1965–66	5	2ª Reg.	4th	
1966–67	4	1ª Reg.	11th	
1967–68	6	3ª Reg.	6th	
1968–1975	DNP			
1975–76	8	3ª Reg.	2nd	
1976–77	7	2ª Reg.	2nd	
1977–78	7	2ª Reg.	1st	

Season	Tier	Division	Place	Copa del Rey
1978–79	6	1ª Reg.	18th	
1979–80	6	1ª Reg.	19th	
1980–81	7	2ª Reg.	2nd	
1981–82	6	1ª Reg.	13th	
1982–83	6	1ª Reg.	20th	
1983–84	7	2ª Reg.	10th	
1984–85	7	2ª Reg.	4th	
1985–86	6	1ª Reg.	2nd	
1986–87	6	1ª Reg.	10th	
1987–88	6	1ª Reg.	2nd	
1988–89	5	Reg. Pref.	1st	
1989–90	4	3ª	11th	
1990–91	4	3ª	10th	
1991–92	4	3ª	9th	
1992–93	4	3ª	16th	
1993–94	4	3ª	8th	
1994–95	4	3ª	15th	
1995–96	4	3ª	10th	
1996–97	4	3ª	13th	
1997–98	4	3ª	15th	

Season	Tier	Division	Place	Copa del Rey
1998–99	4	3ª	16th	
1999–2000	4	3ª	17th	
2000–01	5	Reg. Pref.	2nd	
2001–02	4	3ª	13th	
2002–03	4	3ª	15th	
2003–04	4	3ª	20th	
2004–05	5	Reg. Pref.	8th	
2005–06	5	Reg. Pref.	7th	
2006–07	5	Reg. Pref.	12th	
2007–08	5	Reg. Pref.	16th	
2008–09	6	1ª Reg.	2nd	
2009–10	5	Reg. Pref.	14th	
2010–11	5	Reg. Pref.	18th	
2011–12	6	1ª Reg.	15th	
2012–13	6	1ª Reg.	17th	
2013–14	9	3ª Reg.	2nd	
2014–15	9	3ª Reg.	2nd	
2015–16	8	2ª Reg. B	4th	
2016–17	8	2ª Reg. B	1st	
2017–18	7	2ª Reg.	1st	

Season	Tier	Division	Place	Copa del Rey
2018–19	6	1ª Reg.	5th	
2019–20	6	1ª Reg.	8th	
2020–21	6	1ª Reg.	4th	
2021–22	7	1ª Reg.	9th	
2022–23	7	1ª Reg.	13th	
2023–24	8	2ª Reg.	6th	
2024–25	8	2ª Reg.	15th	
2025–26	8	2ª Reg.		

- 14 seasons in Tercera División
