= Unai Rementería =

Spanish footballer

Personal information
- Full name: Unai Rementería Castro
- Date of birth: 10 August 1999 (age 27)
- Place of birth: Bilbao, Spain
- Height: 1.78 m (5 ft 10 in)
- Position: Midfielder

Team information
- Current team: Yeclano
- Number: 5

Youth career
- 2005–2009: Danok Bat
- 2009–2011: Athletic Bilbao
- 2012–2014: Danok Bat
- 2014–2015: Romo
- 2015–2017: Real Sociedad

Senior career*
| Years | Team | Apps | (Gls) |
| 2017–2018 | Real Sociedad C | 0 | (0) |
| 2017–2018 | → Getxo (loan) | 13 | (2) |
| 2018 | → Bermeo (loan) | 13 | (2) |
| 2018–2019 | Sodupe | 17 | (0) |
| 2019 | Portugalete | 14 | (0) |
| 2019–2020 | Amorebieta | 15 | (1) |
| 2020–2021 | Arenas Getxo | 16 | (4) |
| 2021–2022 | Mirandés | 12 | (0) |
| 2022 | → Bilbao Athletic (loan) | 17 | (0) |
| 2023–2024 | Talavera | 31 | (3) |
| 2024 | Numancia | 12 | (0) |
| 2025 | Tudelano | 13 | (1) |
| 2025–2026 | Cacereño | 14 | (0) |
| 2026– | Yeclano | 12 | (2) |
- * Club domestic league appearances and goals as of 15 May 2026

Unai Rementería Castro (born 10 August 1999) is a Spanish footballer who plays as a midfielder for Segunda Federación club Yeclano.

== Club career ==
Born in Bilbao, Biscay, Basque Country, Rementería joined Real Sociedad's youth setup in 2015, after representing Romo FC, Danok Bat CF and Athletic Bilbao. In 2017, after finishing his formation, he was loaned to Tercera División side CD Getxo, but finished the campaign at fellow league team Bermeo FT, also on loan.

In July 2018, Rementería signed for Sodupe UC also in the fourth division, but moved to fellow league team Club Portugalete the following 23 January. On 9 July 2019, he joined SD Amorebieta in Segunda División B.

On 30 June 2020, after being a backup option, Rementería agreed to a contract with Arenas Club de Getxo, also in the third level. On 31 May of the following year, he signed a three-year deal with Segunda División side CD Mirandés.

Rementería made his professional debut on 16 August 2021, starting in a 0–0 away draw against Málaga CF. The following 27 January, after featuring sparingly, he was loaned to Primera División RFEF side Bilbao Athletic until June.

On 25 August 2022, Rementería terminated his contract with the Jabatos.
