= Real Aranjuez CF =

Real Aranjuez
- Full name: Real Aranjuez Club de Fútbol
- Founded: 1948
- Ground: El Deleite, Aranjuez, Madrid, Spain
- Capacity: 8,000
- Owner: Fernando Chavero Urbina
- Chairman: (Spain) Pedro Javier De La Hoz
- Manager: (Spain) Álvaro Cámara
- League: Tercera Federación – Group 7
- 2025–26: Primera Autonómica de Aficionados – Group 2, 2nd of 18 (promoted)
- Website: https://www.realaranjuezcf.es/es
Home colours	Away colours

Real Aranjuez Club de Fútbol is a Spanish football team based in Aranjuez, in the autonomous community of Madrid. Founded in 1948 it plays in Tercera Federación – Group 7, holding home matches at Estadio El Deleite, with a capacity of 8,000 seats.

== History ==
Aranjuez spent the vast majority of its years in the fourth division, with a four-year stint in the third level (1992–93, 1994–97).

From 2005 to 2007 it suffered consecutive relegations, which left the club in Primera Aficionados (sixth division). Aranjuez immediately gained promotion again, finishing with more points than any of the other group champions.

== Season to season ==
Season	Tier	Division	Place	Copa del Rey
1948–49	6	2ª Reg.	1st	
1949–50	5	2ª Reg. P.	3rd	
1950–51	4	1ª Reg.	4th	
1951–52	4	1ª Reg.	2nd	
1952–53	4	1ª Reg.	1st	
1953–54	3	3ª	9th	
1954–55	3	3ª	3rd	
1955–56	3	3ª	2nd	
1956–57	3	3ª	6th	
1957–58	3	3ª	8th	
1958–59	3	3ª	12th	
1959–60	3	3ª	6th	
1960–61	3	3ª	9th	
1961–62	3	3ª	7th	
1962–63	3	3ª	15th	
1963–64	3	3ª	16th	
1964–65	4	1ª Reg.	1st	
1965–66	3	3ª	11th	
1966–67	3	3ª	10th	
1967–68	3	3ª	12th	

Season	Tier	Division	Place	Copa del Rey
1968–69	4	1ª Reg.	10th	
1969–70	4	1ª Reg.	6th	
1970–71	4	1ª Reg.	8th	
1971–72	4	1ª Reg.	11th	
1972–73	4	1ª Reg.	16th	
1973–74	5	1ª Reg.	8th	
1974–75	5	1ª Reg.	9th	
1975–76	5	1ª Reg.	15th	
1976–77	6	2ª Reg.	1st	
1977–78	6	1ª Reg.	1st	
1978–79	5	Reg. Pref.	7th	
1979–80	5	Reg. Pref.	2nd	
1980–81	4	3ª	1st	
1981–82	4	3ª	12th	First round
1982–83	4	3ª	1st	
1983–84	4	3ª	10th	First round
1984–85	4	3ª	8th	
1985–86	4	3ª	15th	
1986–87	5	Reg. Pref.	2nd	
1987–88	4	3ª	14th	

Season	Tier	Division	Place	Copa del Rey
1988–89	4	3ª	17th	
1989–90	4	3ª	8th	
1990–91	4	3ª	9th	
1991–92	4	3ª	2nd	
1992–93	3	2ª B	19th	Third round
1993–94	4	3ª	1st	First round
1994–95	3	2ª B	14th	First round
1995–96	3	2ª B	8th	
1996–97	3	2ª B	17th	
1997–98	4	3ª	1st	
1998–99	4	3ª	7th	
1999–2000	4	3ª	11th	
2000–01	4	3ª	10th	
2001–02	4	3ª	21st	
2002–03	5	Reg. Pref.	4th	
2003–04	4	3ª	15th	
2004–05	4	3ª	16th	
2005–06	4	3ª	20th	
2006–07	5	Reg. Pref.	16th	
2007–08	6	1ª Reg.	3rd	

Season	Tier	Division	Place	Copa del Rey
2008–09	6	1ª Reg.	1st	
2009–10	5	Pref.	7th	
2010–11	5	Pref.	5th	
2011–12	5	Pref.	1st	
2012–13	4	3ª	10th	
2013–14	4	3ª	19th	
2014–15	5	Pref.	12th	
2015–16	5	Pref.	10th	
2016–17	5	Pref.	7th	
2017–18	5	Pref.	7th	
2018–19	5	Pref.	12th	
2019–20	5	Pref.	2nd	
2020–21	4	3ª	11th / 9th	
2021–22	6	Pref.	2nd	
2022–23	5	3ª Fed.	16th	
2023–24	6	Pref.	7th	
2024–25	6	1ª Aut.	3rd	
2025–26	6	1ª Aut.	2nd	
2026–27	5	3ª Fed.		

- 4 seasons in Segunda División B
- 37 seasons in Tercera División
- 2 seasons in Tercera Federación

== Former players ==
- (Spain) Pepín
- (Spain) Óscar Téllez
- (Equatorial Guinea) Andrés Malango
- (Russia) Dmitri Cheryshev

== Women's team ==
Since 2016, Real Aranjuez has also a women's team. It currently plays in the Regional Leagues of the Community of Madrid.

=== Season by season ===
Season	Tier	Division	Place	Copa de la Reina
2016–17	4	1ª Reg.	15th	
2017–18	4	1ª Reg.	13th	
2018–19	4	1ª Reg.	12th	
2019–20	5	1ª Reg.		
