= SD Hullera Vasco-Leonesa =

Football team in Ciñera, Castile and León, Spain

Hullera
- Full name: Sociedad Deportiva Hullera Vasco–Leonesa
- Founded: 1950
- Dissolved: 2013
- Ground: Santa Bárbara; Ciñera, La Pola de Gordón, Castile and León, Spain
- Capacity: 2,600
- Chairman: (Spain) Javier Alonso de Quintanilla
- 2012–13: Primera Provincial – León, 16th of 16
Home colours	Away colours

Sociedad Deportiva Hullera Vasco-Leonesa was a football team based in Ciñera, town belonging to La Pola de Gordón municipality in the autonomous community of Castile and León. Founded in 1950, it last played in the Primera Provincial – León. Its stadium was Polideportivo Santa Bárbara, with a capacity of 2,600 seats.

The club ceased its activity in 2013.

== Club background ==
- Club Deportivo Hullera (1950–1999)
- Sociedad Deportiva Hullera Vasco-Leonesa (1999–2013)

== Season to season ==
Season	Tier	Division	Place	Copa del Rey
1950–1956	—	Regional	—	
1956–57	3	3ª	4th	
1957–58	3	3ª	8th	
1958–59	3	3ª	8th	
1959–60	3	3ª	8th	
1960–61	3	3ª	5th	
1961–62	3	3ª	6th	
1962–63	3	3ª	8th	
1963–64	3	3ª	8th	
1964–65	3	3ª	4th	
1965–66	3	3ª	4th	
1966–67	3	3ª	11th	
1967–68	3	3ª	8th	
1968–69	3	3ª	16th	
1969–70	3	3ª	19th	First round
1970–71	4	Reg. Pref.	12th	
1971–72	5	1ª Reg.	1st	
1972–73	4	Reg. Pref.	9th	
1973–74	4	Reg. Pref.	16th	
1974–75	5	1ª Reg.	5th	

Season	Tier	Division	Place	Copa del Rey
1975–76	5	1ª Reg.	3rd	
1976–77	5	1ª Reg.	1st	
1977–78	5	Reg. Pref.	18th	
1978–79	6	1ª Reg.	4th	
1979–80	6	1ª Reg.	4th	
1980–81	6	1ª Reg.	1st	
1981–82	5	Reg. Pref.	9th	
1982–83	5	Reg. Pref.	7th	
1983–84	5	Reg. Pref.	4th	
1984–85	5	Reg. Pref.	5th	
1985–86	5	Reg. Pref.	7th	
1986–87	5	Reg. Pref.	8th	
1987–88	5	Reg. Pref.	2nd	
1988–89	4	3ª	16th	
1989–90	4	3ª	14th	
1990–91	4	3ª	6th	
1991–92	4	3ª	13th	First round
1992–93	4	3ª	6th	
1993–94	4	3ª	3rd	First round
1994–95	3	2ª B	20th	First round

Season	Tier	Division	Place	Copa del Rey
1995–96	4	3ª	12th	
1996–97	4	3ª	14th	
1997–98	4	3ª	14th	
1998–99	4	3ª	19th	
1999–2000	5	1ª Reg.	2nd	
2000–01	4	3ª	10th	
2001–02	4	3ª	12th	
2002–03	4	3ª	15th	
2003–04	4	3ª	15th	

Season	Tier	Division	Place	Copa del Rey
2004–05	4	3ª	11th	
2005–06	4	3ª	12th	
2006–07	4	3ª	17th	
2007–08	4	3ª	20th	
2008–09	5	1ª Reg.	16th	
2009–10	6	1ª Prov.	2nd	
2010–11	6	1ª Prov.	1st	
2011–12	5	1ª Reg.	16th	
2012–13	6	1ª Prov.	16th	

- 1 season in Segunda División B
- 32 seasons in Tercera División
