= CDC Moscardó =

Spanish football team

Moscardó
- Full name: Club Deportivo Colonia Moscardó
- Nickname: Mosca
- Founded: 16 August 1945; 81 years ago
- Stadium: Estadio Román Valero
- Capacity: 5,000
- President: Javi Poves
- Head coach: Julio Cidoncha
- League: Tercera Federación – Group 7
- 2025–26: Segunda Federación – Group 5, 16th of 18 (relegated)
- Website: https://cdcmoscardo.com/
Home colours	Away colours	Third colours

Club Deportivo Colonia Moscardó is a Spanish football team based in Madrid, in the namesake community. Founded in 1945 it currently plays in Tercera Federación – Group 7, holding home matches at Estadio Román Valero with a capacity of 5,000 seats.

== History ==
The club was born in 1944 with the aim to create a team for the players of the neighbourhoods of Usera and Colonia de Moscardó. It was officially registered in the Castilian Football Federation on 23 July 1945, and currently belongs to the Madrid Football Federation.

In 1964, Moscardó promoted for the first time to Tercera División, and six years later to Segunda División. The club only could remain in the second tier one season before being relegated again to Tercera; it was the first club to play in the league with a pitch of soil, without grass.

Since that relegation, the club alternated Tercera División and Preferente until 1989, when it promoted to Segunda División B, and alternated Segunda B and Tercera during the 1990s. In the 2000s, the club ended its second golden era and continues playing between fourth and fifth tier.

== Stadium ==
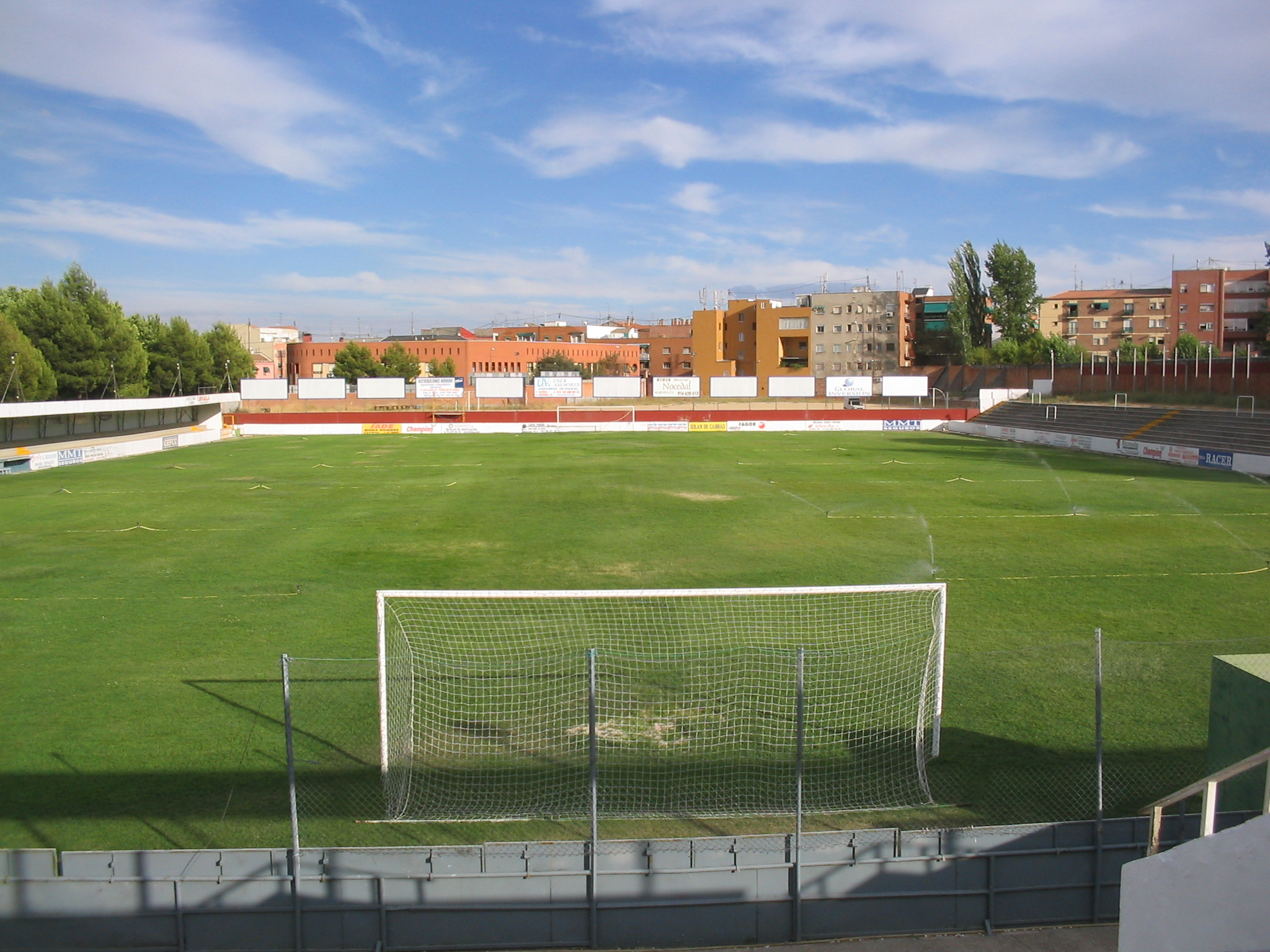
Estadio Román Valero in 2005.

Moscardó play their games at Estadio Román Valero, with capacity for 5,000 people.

During the 1960s, it was expanded for 12,000 people and in the 1970s, the turf was installed. In the 1990s, one of the stands was demolished due to safety reasons.

In 2008, the pitch was replaced by an artificial one.

== Season to season ==
Season	Tier	Division	Place	Copa del Rey
1945–46	6	3ª Reg.	6th	
1946–47	7	3ª Reg.	2nd	
1947–48	7	3ª Reg.	1st	
1948–49	6	2ª Reg.	6th	
1949–50	6	2ª Reg.	5th	
1950–51	6	2ª Reg.	7th	
1951–52	6	2ª Reg.	10th	
1952–53	6	2ª Reg.	9th	
1953–54	6	2ª Reg.	6th	
1954–55	7	4ª Reg.	5th	
1955–56	7	4ª Reg.	9th	
1956–57	7	4ª Reg.	3rd	
1957–58	6	3ª Reg.	4th	
1958–59	5	2ª Reg.	3rd	
1959–60	5	2ª Reg.	1st	
1960–61	4	1ª Reg.	9th	
1961–62	4	1ª Reg.	13th	
1962–63	5	2ª Reg.	5th	
1963–64	4	1ª Reg.	1st	
1964–65	3	3ª	12th	

Season	Tier	Division	Place	Copa del Rey
1965–66	3	3ª	2nd	
1966–67	3	3ª	2nd	
1967–68	3	3ª	3rd	
1968–69	3	3ª	2nd	
1969–70	3	3ª	1st	Fourth round
1970–71	2	2ª	20th	Third round
1971–72	3	3ª	5th	Second round
1972–73	3	3ª	5th	First round
1973–74	3	3ª	5th	Fourth round
1974–75	3	3ª	11th	First round
1975–76	3	3ª	13th	First round
1976–77	3	3ª	14th	First round
1977–78	4	3ª	12th	Second round
1978–79	4	3ª	10th	First round
1979–80	4	3ª	2nd	Third round
1980–81	4	3ª	2nd	First round
1981–82	4	3ª	15th	First round
1982–83	4	3ª	18th	
1983–84	5	Reg. Pref.	4th	
1984–85	5	Reg. Pref.	2nd	

Season	Tier	Division	Place	Copa del Rey
1985–86	4	3ª	19th	
1986–87	5	Reg. Pref.	4th	
1987–88	4	3ª	2nd	
1988–89	4	3ª	1st	
1989–90	3	2ª B	18th	
1990–91	4	3ª	7th	First round
1991–92	4	3ª	7th	Second round
1992–93	4	3ª	3rd	First round
1993–94	4	3ª	3rd	
1994–95	3	2ª B	7th	Second round
1995–96	3	2ª B	14th	First round
1996–97	3	2ª B	18th	
1997–98	4	3ª	12th	
1998–99	4	3ª	9th	
1999–2000	4	3ª	15th	
2000–01	4	3ª	17th	
2001–02	5	Reg. Pref.	2nd	
2002–03	4	3ª	19th	
2003–04	5	Reg. Pref.	4th	
2004–05	5	Reg. Pref.	2nd	

Season	Tier	Division	Place	Copa del Rey
2005–06	4	3ª	18th	
2006–07	5	Reg. Pref.	5th	
2007–08	5	Reg. Pref.	4th	
2008–09	5	Reg. Pref.	7th	
2009–10	5	Pref.	4th	
2010–11	5	Pref.	1st	
2011–12	4	3ª	10th	
2012–13	4	3ª	18th	
2013–14	5	Pref.	5th	
2014–15	5	Pref.	1st	
2015–16	4	3ª	17th	
2016–17	5	Pref.	9th	
2017–18	5	Pref.	5th	
2018–19	5	Pref.	13th	
2019–20	5	Pref.	3rd	
2020–21	5	Pref.	3rd	
2021–22	5	3ª RFEF	21st	
2022–23	6	Pref.	1st	
2023–24	5	3ª Fed.	5th	
2024–25	4	2ª Fed.	12th	

Season	Tier	Division	Place	Copa del Rey
2025–26	4	2ª Fed.	16th	
2026–27	5	3ª Fed.		

- 1 season in Segunda División
- 4 seasons in Segunda División B
- 2 seasons in Segunda Federación
- 34 seasons in Tercera División
- 3 seasons in Tercera Federación/Tercera División RFEF

== Famous players ==
- (Equatorial Guinea) Lino
- (Spain) Oscar Téllez
- (Spain) José María Movilla
