= 1993–94 Tercera División =

Tercera División
- Season: 1993–94

The 1993–94 Tercera División season is the 17th season since establishment the tier four.

== League table ==
=== Group 1 ===
Pos	Team	Pld	W	D	L	GF	GA	GD	Pts	Qualification or relegation
1	Bergantiños CF	38	15	21	2	49	26	+23	51	Promotion play-offs
2	Deportivo La Coruña B	38	18	14	6	71	38	+33	50	Promotion play-offs
3	CD Endesa As Pontes	38	19	9	10	64	38	+26	47	Promotion play-offs
4	Viveiro CF	38	18	10	10	48	34	+14	46	Promotion play-offs
5	SD Burela	38	16	12	10	42	36	+6	44	
6	UD Xove Lago	38	16	12	10	46	37	+9	44	
7	Betanzos CF	38	14	14	10	53	43	+10	42	
8	CD Estradense	38	17	8	13	46	36	+10	42	
9	Villalonga CF	38	13	13	12	42	44	−2	39	
10	Caselas FC	38	14	10	14	60	54	+6	38	
11	RC Villalbés	38	13	12	13	40	40	0	38	
12	SD Mindoniense	38	13	9	16	38	57	−19	35	
13	UD Somozas	38	11	12	15	40	51	−11	34	
14	Órdenes CF	38	9	16	13	35	44	−9	34	
15	CD Lalín	38	11	10	17	40	47	−7	32	
16	CD Carballiño (R)	38	11	10	17	50	48	+2	32	Relegation
17	CD Mosteiro (R)	38	9	14	15	33	47	−14	32	Relegation
18	Portonovo SD (R)	38	11	9	18	39	48	−9	31	Relegation
19	CD Barco (R)	38	7	11	20	32	66	−34	25	Relegation
20	Juventud Cambados (R)	38	8	8	22	32	66	−34	24	Relegation

Source: Fútbol Regional
(R) Relegated

=== Group 2 ===
Pos	Team	Pld	W	D	L	GF	GA	GD	Pts	Qualification or relegation
1	Caudal Deportivo	38	30	5	3	88	22	+66	65	Promotion play-offs
2	Club Siero	38	28	8	2	67	19	+48	64	Promotion play-offs
3	CD Lealtad	38	26	10	2	76	20	+56	62	Promotion play-offs
4	Club Marino de Luanco	38	22	6	10	75	31	+44	50	Promotion play-offs
5	SD Rey Aurelio	38	17	11	10	53	26	+27	45	
6	UD Gijón Industrial	38	14	11	13	58	59	−1	39	
7	Deportiva Piloñesa	38	12	15	11	49	50	−1	39	
8	Club Hispano de Castrillón	38	10	16	12	44	46	−2	36	
9	Candás CF	38	13	10	15	40	46	−6	36	
10	Real Titánico	38	13	9	16	43	53	−10	35	
11	SD Lenense	38	12	11	15	37	41	−4	35	
12	Ribadesella CF	38	12	11	15	49	49	0	35	
13	Santiago de Aller CF	38	11	11	16	50	54	−4	33	
14	CD Turón	38	10	12	16	28	45	−17	32	
15	Navarro CF	38	8	15	15	26	43	−17	31	
16	Pumarín CF	38	8	15	15	40	59	−19	31	
17	Navia CF	38	8	11	19	34	55	−21	27	
18	Berrón CF (R)	38	10	7	21	31	64	−33	27	Relegation
19	Club Astur (R)	38	7	11	20	25	68	−43	25	Relegation
20	Valdesoto CF (R)	38	2	9	27	23	86	−63	13	Relegation

Source: Fútbol Regional
(R) Relegated

=== Group 3 ===
Pos	Team	Pld	W	D	L	GF	GA	GD	Pts	Qualification or relegation
1	SD Noja	38	26	9	3	84	16	+68	61	Promotion play-offs
2	Racing de Santander B	38	26	7	5	98	23	+75	59	Promotion play-offs
3	CD Laredo	38	19	15	4	57	27	+30	53	Promotion play-offs
4	Castro FC	38	19	13	6	56	28	+28	51	Promotion play-offs
5	UM Escobedo	38	20	11	7	62	35	+27	51	
6	CD Tropezón	38	20	10	8	49	29	+20	50	
7	CD Cayón	38	17	8	13	51	42	+9	42	
8	SD Barreda Balompié	38	12	16	10	40	39	+1	40	
9	SD Unión Club	38	12	14	12	41	29	+12	38	
10	CD Pontejos	38	12	13	13	43	46	−3	37	
11	Ribamontán al Mar CF	38	12	12	14	39	41	−2	36	
12	CD Colindres	38	12	12	14	47	44	+3	36	
13	CD Comillas	38	13	10	15	46	52	−6	36	
14	Marina de Cudeyo CF	38	11	12	15	42	45	−3	34	
15	Velarde CF	38	12	4	22	46	56	−10	28	
16	CD Bezana	38	9	10	19	42	71	−29	28	
17	CD Naval	38	6	15	17	27	53	−26	27	
18	CD Ramales (R)	38	7	12	19	20	65	−45	26	Relegation
19	SD Torina (R)	38	3	8	27	22	88	−66	14	Relegation
20	SD Gama (R)	38	1	11	26	22	105	−83	13	Relegation

Source: Fútbol Regional
(R) Relegated

=== Group 4 ===
Pos	Team	Pld	W	D	L	GF	GA	GD	Pts	Qualification or relegation
1	Amurrio Club	38	19	15	4	70	32	+38	53	Promotion play-offs
2	CD Aurrerá de Vitoria	38	19	12	7	57	30	+27	50	Promotion play-offs
3	SD Gernika Club	38	17	14	7	63	31	+32	48	Promotion play-offs
4	SCD Durango	38	18	11	9	58	25	+33	47	Promotion play-offs
5	CD Elgoibar	38	15	14	9	53	35	+18	44	
6	Arenas Club de Getxo	38	16	12	10	47	40	+7	44	
7	Zalla UC	38	15	12	11	46	43	+3	42	
8	CD Santurtzi	38	13	15	10	40	30	+10	41	
9	CD Aurrerá Ondarroa	38	13	14	11	51	50	+1	40	
10	Mondragón CF	38	14	10	14	46	42	+4	38	
11	Tolosa CF	38	13	11	14	38	49	−11	37	
12	CD Hernani	38	12	10	16	45	55	−10	34	
13	Balmaseda CF	38	12	10	16	43	60	−17	34	
14	CD Getxo	38	11	11	16	46	51	−5	33	
15	CD Munguía	38	9	13	16	38	48	−10	31	
16	SD Urola KE	38	10	11	17	41	61	−20	31	
17	SD Amorebieta	38	10	11	17	44	63	−19	31	
18	Sodupe UC (R)	38	7	15	16	36	60	−24	29	Relegation
19	Anaitasuna FT (R)	38	10	7	21	35	59	−24	27	Relegation
20	SD Erandio Club (R)	38	7	12	19	39	72	−33	26	Relegation

Source: Fútbol Regional
(R) Relegated

=== Group 5 ===
Pos	Team	Pld	W	D	L	GF	GA	GD	Pts	Qualification or relegation
1	CE Sabadell	38	22	10	6	76	33	+43	54	Promotion play-offs
2	Terrassa FC	38	22	9	7	65	41	+24	53	Promotion play-offs
3	FC Barcelona C	38	22	5	11	91	49	+42	49	Promotion play-offs
4	CE Europa	38	19	11	8	70	55	+15	49	Promotion play-offs
5	CF Balaguer	38	18	10	10	75	40	+35	46	
6	CF Badalona	38	16	13	9	64	50	+14	45	
7	FC Martinenc	38	16	9	13	69	53	+16	41	
8	Vilobí CF	38	18	6	14	57	50	+7	40	
9	CRE Cristinenc Español	38	14	10	14	43	52	−9	38	
10	UD Cerdanyola de Mataró	38	12	13	13	50	50	0	37	
11	CE Júpiter	38	12	12	14	54	65	−11	36	
12	CF Igualada	38	13	10	15	51	60	−9	36	
13	CF Reus Deportiu	38	14	7	17	57	56	+1	35	
14	CD Tortosa	38	11	10	17	44	62	−18	32	
15	UE Sants	38	10	11	17	49	57	−8	31	
16	Atlètic Roda de Barà	38	12	7	19	35	51	−16	31	
17	EC Granollers	38	11	8	19	51	66	−15	30	
18	FC Palafrugell (R)	38	10	9	19	62	89	−27	29	Relegation
19	UE Olot (R)	38	8	10	20	33	68	−35	26	Relegation
20	CD Blanes (R)	38	4	12	22	30	79	−49	20	Relegation

Source: Fútbol Regional
(R) Relegated

=== Group 6 ===
Pos	Team	Pld	W	D	L	GF	GA	GD	Pts	Qualification or relegation
1	Pinoso CF	38	22	9	7	71	23	+48	53	Promotion play-offs
2	Ontinyent CF	38	22	9	7	75	37	+38	53	Promotion play-offs
3	Crevillente Deportivo	38	17	16	5	66	35	+31	50	Promotion play-offs
4	CD Eldense	38	21	8	9	79	33	+46	50	Promotion play-offs
5	CD Utiel	38	19	12	7	60	37	+23	50	
6	CD Onda	38	19	11	8	60	28	+32	49	
7	CD Alberique	38	15	16	7	50	22	+28	46	
8	Alicante CF	38	16	12	10	44	26	+18	44	
9	Llíria CF	38	13	16	9	65	47	+18	42	
10	Mutxamel CF	38	14	13	11	57	39	+18	41	
11	SD Sueca	38	13	12	13	49	47	+2	38	
12	CD Villena	38	13	9	16	45	44	+1	35	
13	UD Oliva	38	12	11	15	43	47	−4	35	
14	UD Alaquàs	38	8	15	15	34	39	−5	31	
15	UD Horadada	38	11	8	19	43	75	−32	30	
16	CD Jávea	38	9	12	17	38	45	−7	30	
17	CF Gandía	38	7	14	17	33	58	−25	28	
18	Orihuela Deportiva CF (R)	38	9	9	20	31	49	−18	25	Relegation
19	UD Alzira (R)	38	6	7	25	32	81	−49	19	Relegation
20	Calpe CF (R)	38	3	3	32	22	185	−163	9	Relegation

Source: Fútbol Regional
(R) Relegated

=== Group 7 ===
Pos	Team	Pld	W	D	L	GF	GA	GD	Pts	Qualification or relegation
1	Aranjuez CF	38	24	10	4	90	40	+50	58	Promotion play-offs
2	CF Fuenlabrada	38	23	8	7	76	35	+41	54	Promotion play-offs
3	CD Colonia Moscardó	38	21	12	5	70	31	+39	54	Promotion play-offs
4	CD Móstoles	38	20	12	6	63	32	+31	52	Promotion play-offs
5	CD Las Rozas	38	18	15	5	78	36	+42	51	
6	AD Parla	38	20	11	7	65	38	+27	51	
7	AD Rayo Vallecano B	38	17	13	8	63	28	+35	47	
8	CD Leganés B	38	17	9	12	74	51	+23	43	
9	DAV Santa Ana	38	16	9	13	62	53	+9	41	
10	AD Torrejón	38	12	16	10	56	45	+11	40	
11	CF Rayo Majadahona	38	16	7	15	66	61	+5	39	
12	CD Pegaso	38	14	9	15	47	58	−11	37	
13	CD San Fernando de Henares	38	13	9	16	43	63	−20	35	
14	CD El Álamo	38	12	11	15	47	55	−8	35	
15	AD Alcobendas	38	10	7	21	44	77	−33	27	
16	AD Alcorcón	38	9	9	20	30	70	−40	27	
17	CD Carabanchel	38	8	8	22	42	86	−44	24	
18	CD Vicálvaro	38	5	8	25	26	65	−39	18	
19	SR Villaverde Boetticher CF	38	5	5	28	35	92	−57	15	
20	RSD Alcalá (R)	38	4	4	30	25	86	−61	12	Relegation

Source: Fútbol Regional
(R) Relegated

=== Group 8 ===
Pos	Team	Pld	W	D	L	GF	GA	GD	Pts	Qualification or relegation
1	CD Laguna	38	21	12	5	68	28	+40	54	Promotion play-offs
2	CD Salmantino	38	21	10	7	63	31	+32	52	Promotion play-offs
3	SD Hullera Vasco-Leonesa	38	19	13	6	71	30	+41	51	Promotion play-offs
4	CA Bembibre	38	19	13	6	70	29	+41	51	Promotion play-offs
5	Zamora CF	38	21	9	8	51	21	+30	51	
6	SD Gimnástica Segoviana	38	21	7	10	62	38	+24	49	
7	Arandina CF	38	17	12	9	63	46	+17	46	
8	RCD Ribert	38	15	13	10	41	31	+10	43	
9	Atlético Burgalés (Note: Relegated due to the administrative relegation of Real Burgos CF.) (R)	38	15	12	11	50	40	+10	42	Relegation
10	SD Gimnástica Medinense	38	15	11	12	42	32	+10	41	
11	La Bañeza FC	38	14	11	13	54	48	+6	39	
12	SC Uxama	38	12	14	12	37	35	+2	38	
13	CD Venta de Baños	38	10	14	14	45	57	−12	34	
14	CD Endesa Ponferrada	38	11	11	16	40	46	−6	33	
15	Racing Lermeño CF	38	14	5	19	43	53	−10	33	
16	Club Cultural de León (Note: Relegated due to the relegation of Cultural y Deportiva Leonesa.) (R)	38	7	13	18	30	54	−24	27	Relegation
17	SD Almazán	38	9	8	21	32	60	−28	26	
18	CD Béjar Industrial (R)	38	6	9	23	24	82	−58	21	Relegation
19	CD Aguilar (R)	38	4	8	26	25	95	−70	16	Relegation
20	CD Guardo (R)	38	4	5	29	34	89	−55	13	Relegation

Source: Fútbol Regional
(R) Relegated

=== Group 9 ===
Pos	Team	Pld	W	D	L	GF	GA	GD	Pts	Qualification or relegation
1	CP Almería	38	31	5	2	95	19	+76	67	Promotion play-offs
2	Vélez CF	38	25	8	5	65	29	+36	58	Promotion play-offs
3	Martos CD	38	20	9	9	56	33	+23	49	Promotion play-offs
4	Guadix CF	38	19	10	9	57	29	+28	48	Promotion play-offs
5	CD Baza	38	18	10	10	61	46	+15	46	
6	Atarfe Industrial CF	38	16	13	9	52	32	+20	45	
7	UD Maracena	38	16	12	10	66	46	+20	44	
8	Baeza CF	38	15	10	13	49	53	−4	40	
9	Recreativo Granada	38	13	12	13	52	49	+3	38	
10	PD Garrucha	38	14	9	15	53	53	0	37	
11	UD San Pedro	38	11	15	12	37	41	−4	37	
12	AD Adra	38	12	12	14	45	49	−4	36	
13	Arenas de Armilla CD	38	13	9	16	43	62	−19	35	
14	CD Roquetas	38	12	10	16	55	50	+5	34	
15	Juventud de Torremolinos CF	38	12	10	16	36	45	−9	34	
16	Club Atlético Estación	38	8	10	20	39	65	−26	26	
17	CF Antequera–Puerto Malagueño	38	9	7	22	33	56	−23	25	
18	CD Los Boliches (R)	38	7	9	22	29	64	−35	23	Relegation
19	Úbeda CF (R)	38	9	5	24	31	73	−42	23	Relegation
20	Iliturgi CF (R)	38	3	9	26	22	82	−60	15	Relegation

Source: Fútbol Regional
(R) Relegated

=== Group 10 ===
Pos	Team	Pld	W	D	L	GF	GA	GD	Pts	Qualification or relegation
1	Real Betis Balompié B	38	24	9	5	84	21	+63	57	Promotion play-offs
2	UD Los Palacios	38	15	16	7	50	23	+27	46	Promotion play-offs
3	CD San Fernando	38	14	15	9	42	37	+5	43	Promotion play-offs
4	Atlético Cortegana	38	14	13	11	52	44	+8	41	Promotion play-offs
5	Club Atlético de Ceuta	38	12	17	9	38	32	+6	41	
6	Cádiz CF B	38	14	12	12	44	40	+4	40	
7	Atlético Sanluqueño CF	38	13	14	11	50	42	+8	40	
8	Sanlúcar CF	38	15	10	13	49	40	+9	40	
9	Coria CF	38	12	15	11	39	36	+3	39	
10	RB Linense	38	13	13	12	35	36	−1	39	
11	CMD San Juan	38	15	8	15	46	42	+4	38	
12	CD Mairena	38	14	10	14	49	44	+5	38	
13	Jerez Industrial CF	38	12	13	13	36	39	−3	37	
14	Puente Genil CF	38	14	8	16	40	52	−12	36	
15	UD Roteña	38	14	7	17	43	56	−13	35	
16	Atlético Lucentino Industrial	38	12	11	15	42	56	−14	35	
17	Montilla CF	38	9	16	13	35	47	−12	34	
18	CD Pozoblanco	38	7	15	16	40	52	−12	29	
19	CD Egabrense (R)	38	7	15	16	31	61	−30	29	Relegation
20	CD Lebrija (R)	38	7	9	22	35	80	−45	23	Relegation

Source: Fútbol Regional
(R) Relegated

=== Group 11 ===
Pos	Team	Pld	W	D	L	GF	GA	GD	Pts	Qualification or relegation
1	RCD Mallorca B	38	25	7	6	99	34	+65	57	Promotion play-offs
2	CD Atlético Baleares	38	23	9	6	80	30	+50	55	Promotion play-offs
3	CD Montuïri	38	24	5	9	62	49	+13	53	Promotion play-offs
4	CD Cala Millor	38	16	11	11	51	42	+9	43	Promotion play-offs
5	CD Playas de Calvià	38	17	7	14	66	48	+18	41	
6	CF Sporting Mahonés	38	15	10	13	51	33	+18	40	
7	CF Sóller	38	17	6	15	57	48	+9	40	
8	CD Constancia	38	15	8	15	66	62	+4	38	
9	UD Poblense	38	14	10	14	51	50	+1	38	
10	UD Arenal	38	13	11	14	39	47	−8	37	
11	CD Cardassar	38	14	9	15	38	44	−6	37	
12	CF Pollença	38	12	12	14	44	49	−5	36	
13	CD Ferriolense	38	13	10	15	42	47	−5	36	
14	Atlético de Ciudadela CF	38	15	5	18	44	58	−14	35	
15	CD Alayor	38	11	12	15	40	57	−17	34	
16	SD Ibiza (R)	38	11	11	16	37	48	−11	33	Relegation
17	CD Ferrerías (R)	38	11	11	16	39	51	−12	33	Relegation
18	CD Esporlas (R)	38	9	8	21	48	82	−34	26	Relegation
19	CD Calvià (R)	38	8	8	22	32	69	−37	24	Relegation
20	Recreativo La Victoria (R)	38	8	8	22	26	64	−38	24	Relegation

Source: Fútbol Regional
(R) Relegated

=== Group 12 ===
Pos	Team	Pld	W	D	L	GF	GA	GD	Pts	Qualification or relegation
1	UD Orotava	38	22	10	6	99	44	+55	54	Promotion play-offs
2	CD Corralejo	38	22	10	6	71	31	+40	54	Promotion play-offs
3	UD Las Palmas B	38	20	10	8	66	29	+37	50	Promotion play-offs
4	SD Tenisca	38	19	11	8	56	41	+15	49	Promotion play-offs
5	UD Gáldar	38	18	11	9	65	36	+29	47	
6	UD Ibarra	38	17	13	8	61	41	+20	47	
7	CD Arguineguín	38	18	8	12	75	54	+21	44	
8	Estrella CF	38	16	12	10	44	43	+1	44	
9	AD Laguna	38	15	13	10	58	56	+2	43	
10	UD Telde	38	11	16	11	60	42	+18	38	
11	UD Salud Tenerife	38	13	12	13	70	57	+13	38	
12	UD Gomera	38	10	15	13	33	41	−8	35	
13	UD Vecindario	38	11	12	15	43	52	−9	34	
14	Atlético Arona	38	10	10	18	39	72	−33	30	
15	UD Icodense	38	10	8	20	41	77	−36	28	
16	Real Artesano FC	38	9	10	19	32	56	−24	28	
17	UD Güímar	38	11	6	21	37	72	−35	28	
18	UD Lanzarote (R)	38	9	9	20	39	56	−17	27	Relegation
19	Ferreras CF (R)	38	6	11	21	32	58	−26	23	Relegation
20	CD Gara (R)	38	7	5	26	28	91	−63	19	Relegation

Source: Fútbol Regional
(R) Relegated

=== Group 13 ===
Pos	Team	Pld	W	D	L	GF	GA	GD	Pts	Qualification or relegation
1	Águilas CF	38	25	9	4	91	22	+69	59	Promotion play-offs
2	CD Roldán	38	24	10	4	78	26	+52	58	Promotion play-offs
3	CD Torre Pacheco	38	22	9	7	61	37	+24	53	Promotion play-offs
4	Caravaca CF	38	21	8	9	74	32	+42	50	Promotion play-offs
5	Real Murcia CF B	38	17	16	5	69	30	+39	50	
6	Pinatar CF	38	17	9	12	65	50	+15	43	
7	Jumilla CF	38	16	10	12	58	49	+9	42	
8	Lorca Promesas CF	38	14	9	15	57	65	−8	37	
9	AD Mar Menor	38	11	14	13	62	65	−3	36	
10	CD Beniel	38	10	16	12	31	45	−14	36	
11	AD Las Palas	38	14	6	18	54	67	−13	34	
12	CF Santomera	38	14	5	19	44	73	−29	33	
13	Muleño CF	38	10	12	16	37	39	−2	32	
14	Abarán CF	38	8	15	15	44	69	−25	31	
15	Atlético Murcia	38	7	16	15	45	54	−9	30	
16	Cartagena FC B	38	12	8	18	46	61	−15	30	
17	CF Lorca Deportiva (R)	38	10	10	18	48	64	−16	30	Relegation
18	CF Bala Azul (R)	38	9	10	19	33	60	−27	28	Relegation
19	Cehegín FC (R)	38	8	8	22	35	80	−45	24	Relegation
20	CD Alberca (R)	38	5	12	21	34	78	−44	22	Relegation

Source: Fútbol Regional
(R) Relegated

=== Group 14 ===
Pos	Team	Pld	W	D	L	GF	GA	GD	Pts	Qualification or relegation
1	Club Cristian Lay Jerez	38	31	4	3	128	28	+100	66	Promotion play-offs
2	UP Plasencia	38	27	7	4	105	25	+80	61	Promotion play-offs
3	UD Mérida Promesas	38	21	13	4	72	34	+38	55	Promotion play-offs
4	CD Don Benito	38	23	8	7	68	27	+41	54	Promotion play-offs
5	Moralo CP	38	22	8	8	76	25	+51	52	
6	CD Badajoz B	38	19	11	8	56	24	+32	49	
7	CD Burguillos	38	20	9	9	38	23	+15	49	
8	CD Azuaga	38	15	7	16	43	40	+3	37	
9	CD Castuera	38	14	6	18	54	56	−2	34	
10	AD Llerenense	38	12	10	16	45	62	−17	34	
11	SP Villafranca	38	13	6	19	41	59	−18	32	
12	CD San Serván (Note: Resigned to the Tercera División for the next season.) (R)	38	11	8	19	30	47	−17	30	Relegation
13	UD Fornacense	38	9	12	17	34	52	−18	30	
14	UC La Estrella	38	7	15	16	34	56	−22	29	
15	CD Miajadas	38	10	8	20	33	64	−31	28	
16	CD Santa Amalia	38	9	9	20	43	68	−25	27	
17	CP Malpartida Cacereño	38	11	4	23	44	79	−35	26	
18	UD Montijo (R)	38	9	6	23	37	90	−53	24	Relegation
19	CD Valdelacalzada (R)	38	8	6	24	24	84	−60	22	Relegation
20	CP Monesterio (R)	38	6	9	23	36	98	−62	21	Relegation

Source: Fútbol Regional
(R) Relegated

=== Group 15 ===
Pos	Team	Pld	W	D	L	GF	GA	GD	Pts	Qualification or relegation
1	Peña Sport FC	38	23	8	7	88	37	+51	54	Promotion play-offs
2	CD Ribaforada	38	21	10	7	53	35	+18	52	Promotion play-offs
3	CD Calahorra	38	19	11	8	58	37	+21	49	Promotion play-offs
4	UDC Chantrea	38	20	6	12	71	44	+27	46	Promotion play-offs
5	CD Mirandés	38	18	7	13	46	30	+16	43	
6	CD Baztán	38	17	7	14	62	43	+19	41	
7	CD Beti Onak	38	14	13	11	52	48	+4	41	
8	CA River Ebro	38	17	6	15	51	49	+2	40	
9	AD San Juan	38	12	15	11	39	41	−2	39	
10	UCD Burladés	38	16	7	15	56	59	−3	39	
11	CD Varea	38	13	12	13	46	52	−6	38	
12	Atlético Artajones	38	12	13	13	46	45	+1	37	
13	CD Oberena	38	15	6	17	55	56	−1	36	
14	AD Noáin	38	13	9	16	45	49	−4	35	
15	CD Alfaro	38	11	13	14	43	55	−12	35	
16	CD Egüés	38	11	10	17	42	51	−9	32	
17	Haro Deportivo	38	10	9	19	34	58	−24	29	
18	Yagüe CF (R)	38	7	14	17	41	72	−31	28	Relegation
19	CD Arnedo (R)	38	10	5	23	37	68	−31	25	Relegation
20	CD Berceo (R)	38	7	7	24	43	79	−36	21	Relegation

Source: Fútbol Regional
(R) Relegated

=== Group 16 ===
Pos	Team	Pld	W	D	L	GF	GA	GD	Pts	Qualification or relegation
1	SD Huesca	38	24	12	2	97	24	+73	60	Promotion play-offs
2	Real Zaragoza B	38	24	9	5	70	16	+54	57	Promotion play-offs
3	UD Casetas	38	22	9	7	84	36	+48	53	Promotion play-offs
4	UD Barbastro	38	20	12	6	70	38	+32	52	Promotion play-offs
5	CD Teruel	38	21	10	7	72	40	+32	52	
6	UD Fraga	38	20	8	10	68	47	+21	48	
7	CD Binéfar	38	19	9	10	69	26	+43	47	
8	Atlético Monzalbarba	38	12	17	9	56	47	+9	41	
9	CF Hernán Cortés	38	13	13	12	41	41	0	39	
10	CD La Almunia	38	13	10	15	51	60	−9	36	
11	CD Sariñena	38	11	13	14	51	60	−9	35	
12	CDJ Tamarite	38	14	7	17	42	55	−13	35	
13	SD Tarazona	38	12	9	17	41	48	−7	33	
14	CD Caspe	38	9	13	16	46	72	−26	31	
15	Alcañiz CF	38	9	13	16	37	52	−15	31	
16	AD Sabiñánigo	38	10	9	19	46	76	−30	29	
17	CD Alcorisa	38	6	12	20	48	83	−35	24	
18	Atlético Monzón (R)	38	7	7	24	35	90	−55	21	Relegation
19	CD Ebro (R)	38	6	9	23	30	75	−45	21	Relegation
20	CD Valdefierro (R)	38	4	7	27	24	92	−68	15	Relegation

Source: Fútbol Regional
(R) Relegated

=== Group 17 ===
Pos	Team	Pld	W	D	L	GF	GA	GD	Pts	Qualification or relegation
1	CD Manchego	38	24	8	6	68	26	+42	56	Promotion play-offs
2	Atlético Ciudad Real	38	22	10	6	65	21	+44	54	Promotion play-offs
3	CP Villarrobledo	38	22	7	9	55	38	+17	51	Promotion play-offs
4	Puertollano Industrial CF	38	19	11	8	60	38	+22	49	Promotion play-offs
5	Almagro CF	38	16	14	8	60	47	+13	46	
6	CF Gimnástico Alcázar	38	18	9	11	62	43	+19	45	
7	Manzanares CF	38	17	10	11	44	33	+11	44	
8	Albacete Balompié B	38	15	11	12	58	42	+16	41	
9	CD Torrijos	38	14	12	12	48	38	+10	40	
10	UB Conquense	38	15	8	15	44	40	+4	38	
11	CD Guadalajara	38	14	10	14	40	45	−5	38	
12	Atlético Pedro Muñoz CF	38	11	14	13	42	53	−11	36	
13	AD Campillo	38	10	14	14	43	50	−7	34	
14	CD Azuqueca	38	13	8	17	40	61	−21	34	
15	UD Mavisa Villacañas	38	14	5	19	41	54	−13	33	
16	CD Los Yébenes	38	12	8	18	62	63	−1	32	
17	CD La Roda	38	6	14	18	43	64	−21	26	
18	UD Santa Bárbara (R)	38	8	9	21	41	62	−21	25	Relegation
19	Mora CF (R)	38	6	12	20	27	54	−27	24	Relegation
20	UD Socuéllamos CF (R)	38	4	6	28	22	93	−71	12	Relegation

Source: Fútbol Regional
(R) Relegated

== Playoffs ==
- 1994 Tercera División play-offs
