= UD Casetas =

Casetas
- Full name: Unión Deportiva Casetas
- Founded: 1922
- Ground: San Miguel, Casetas, Zaragoza, Aragon, Spain
- Capacity: 1,000
- President: Cecilio García Sánchez
- Head coach: Tomás Guerrero
- League: Tercera Federación – Group 17
- 2024–25: Regional Preferente – Group 1, 2nd of 18 (promoted)
Home colours	Away colours

Unión Deportiva Casetas is a Spanish football team based in Casetas, Zaragoza, in the autonomous community of Aragon. Founded in 1922, it plays in Tercera Federación – Group 17, holding home matches at Campo Municipal de Fútbol San Miguel, which has a capacity of 1,000 people.

== History ==
Founded in 1922, Casetas played the most of their history in the regional leagues until achieving promotion to Tercera División in 1992. The club quickly established themselves in the division, also playing in Segunda División B during the 1994–95 campaign.

Casetas returned to the third division in 2003, being immediately relegated back. In 2007 the club suffered another relegation, only returning to the fourth division in 2018 but still lasting only one season.

=== Club background ===
- Unión Deportiva Casetas (1920–48)
- Unión Deportiva Cerámica Casetas (1948–53)
- Unión Deportiva Casetas (1953–present)

== Season to season ==
Season	Tier	Division	Place	Copa del Rey
1940–41	4	1ª Reg.	5th	
1941–42	3	1ª Reg.	8th	
1942–1946	DNP			
1946–47	6	3ª Reg.	2nd	
1947–48	5	2ª Reg.	5th	
1948–49	5	2ª Reg.	6th	
1949–1953	DNP			
1953–54	5	2ª Reg.	2nd	
1954–55	4	1ª Reg.	7th	
1955–56	5	2ª Reg.	1st	
1956–57	4	1ª Reg.	5th	
1957–1963	DNP			
1963–64	6	3ª Reg.	3rd	
1964–65	6	3ª Reg.	1st	
1965–66	5	2ª Reg.	2nd	
1966–67	4	1ª Reg.	5th	
1967–68	4	1ª Reg.	3rd	
1968–69	4	Reg. Pref.	5th	
1969–70	4	Reg. Pref.	4th	
1970–71	4	Reg. Pref.	8th	

Season	Tier	Division	Place	Copa del Rey
1971–72	4	Reg. Pref.	10th	
1972–73	4	Reg. Pref.	19th	
1973–74	5	1ª Reg.	11th	
1974–75	5	1ª Reg.	8th	
1975–76	5	1ª Reg.	5th	
1976–77	5	1ª Reg.	3rd	
1977–78	5	Reg. Pref.	10th	
1978–79	4	Reg. Pref.	17th	
1979–80	5	Reg. Pref.	17th	
1980–81	5	Reg. Pref.	17th	
1981–82	6	1ª Reg.	17th	
1982–83	7	2ª Reg.	11th	
1983–84	7	2ª Reg.	13th	
1984–85	7	2ª Reg.	17th	
1985–86	7	2ª Reg.	1st	
1986–87	7	2ª Reg.	4th	
1987–88	7	2ª Reg.	3rd	
1988–89	6	1ª Reg.	12th	
1989–90	6	1ª Reg.	4th	
1990–91	6	1ª Reg.	1st	

Season	Tier	Division	Place	Copa del Rey
1991–92	5	Reg. Pref.	1st	
1992–93	4	3ª	4th	
1993–94	4	3ª	3rd	
1994–95	3	2ª B	16th	
1995–96	4	3ª	3rd	
1996–97	4	3ª	5th	
1997–98	4	3ª	4th	
1998–99	4	3ª	2nd	
1999–2000	4	3ª	6th	
2000–01	4	3ª	11th	
2001–02	4	3ª	5th	
2002–03	4	3ª	3rd	
2003–04	3	2ª B	17th	
2004–05	4	3ª	7th	
2005–06	4	3ª	16th	
2006–07	4	3ª	20th	
2007–08	5	Reg. Pref.	7th	
2008–09	5	Reg. Pref.	7th	
2009–10	5	Reg. Pref.	10th	
2010–11	5	Reg. Pref.	9th	

Season	Tier	Division	Place	Copa del Rey
2011–12	5	Reg. Pref.	7th	
2012–13	5	Reg. Pref.	3rd	
2013–14	5	Reg. Pref.	10th	
2014–15	5	Reg. Pref.	8th	
2015–16	5	Reg. Pref.	4th	
2016–17	5	Reg. Pref.	8th	
2017–18	5	Reg. Pref.	2nd	
2018–19	4	3ª	20th	
2019–20	5	Reg. Pref.	6th	
2020–21	5	Reg. Pref.	4th	
2021–22	6	Reg. Pref.	9th	
2022–23	6	Reg. Pref.	8th	
2023–24	6	Reg. Pref.	6th	
2024–25	6	Reg. Pref.	2nd	
2025–26	5	3ª Fed.		

- 2 seasons in Segunda División B
- 14 seasons in Tercera División
- 1 season in Tercera Federación
