= 2009–10 Segunda División B =

Segunda División B
- Season: 2009–10
- Champions: Granada
- Promoted: Granada; Ponferradina; Barcelona Atlètic; Alcorcón

The 2009–10 Segunda División B season was the 33rd since its establishment. The first matches of the season were played on 29 August 2009, and the season ended on 20 June 2010 with the promotion play-off finals.

== Group 1 ==
- Teams from Basque Country, Castile and León and Galicia and Navarre.

=== Summary before 2009–10 season ===
- Scores and Classification - Group 1
- Playoffs de Ascenso:
  - Real Unión - Promoted to Segunda División
  - Cultural Leonesa - Eliminated in First Round
  - SD Ponferradina - Eliminated in Second Round
  - Zamora CF - Eliminated in First Round

- Promoted to this group from Tercera División:
  - Montañeros - Founded in: 1977//, Based in: A Coruña, Galicia//, Promoted From: Group 1
  - Izarra - Founded in: 1924//, Based in: Estella-Lizarra, Navarre//, Promoted From: Group 15
  - Mirandés - Founded in: 1927//, Based in: Miranda de Ebro, Castile and León//, Promoted From: Group 8
  - Compostela - Founded in: 1962//, Based in: Santiago de Compostela, Galicia//, Promoted From: Group 1
  - Palencia - Founded in: 1975//, Based in: Palencia, Castile and León//, Promoted From: Group 8

- Relegated to this group from Segunda División:
  - Alavés - Founded in: 1921//, Based in: Vitoria-Gasteiz, Basque Country//, Relegated From: Segunda División
  - Eibar - Founded in: 1940//, Based in: Eibar, Basque Country//, Relegated From: Segunda División

- Relegated to Tercera División:
  - Ciudad Santiago - Founded in: 1978//, Based in: Santiago de Compostela, Galicia//, Relegated to: Group 1
  - Deportivo B - Founded in: 1964//, Based in: A Coruña, Galicia//, Relegated to: Group 1
  - Real Sociedad B - Founded in: 1951//, Based in: San Sebastián, Basque Country//, Relegated to: Group 4
  - Valladolid B - Founded in: 1944//, Based in: Valladolid, Castile and León//, Relegated to: Group 8
  - Marino de Luanco - Founded in: 1931//, Based in: Luanco, Asturias//, Relegated to: Group 2

=== Teams ===
Location of teams in Segunda División B Gr. 1 2009–10

Group 1
	Team	Founded in	Based in	Ground
1	Barakaldo	1917	Barakaldo, Basque Country	Lasesarre
2	Racing de Ferrol	1919	Ferrol, Galicia	A Malata
3	Alavés	1921	Vitoria-Gasteiz, Basque Country	Mendizorroza
4	Ponferradina	1922	Ponferrada, Castile and León	El Toralín
5	C. Leonesa	1923	León, Castile and León	Reino de León
6	Lemona	1923	Lemoa, Basque Country	Arlonagusia
7	Izarra	1924	Estella-Lizarra, Navarre	Merkatondoa
8	Mirandés	1927	Miranda de Ebro, Castile and León	Anduva
9	Eibar	1940	Eibar, Basque Country	Ipurua
10	Pontevedra	1941	Pontevedra, Galicia	Pasarón
11	Lugo	1953	Lugo, Galicia	Anxo Carro
12	Compostela	1962	Santiago, Galicia	San Lázaro
13	Bilbao Athletic	1964	Bilbao, Basque Country	Lezama
14	Osasuna B	1964	Pamplona, Navarre	Tajonar
15	Zamora	1969	Zamora, Castile and León	Ruta de la Plata
16	Guijuelo	1974	Guijuelo, Castile and León	Municipal de Guijuelo
17	Palencia	1975	Palencia, Castile and León	Nueva Balastera
18	Montañeros	1977	A Coruña, Galicia	Campo de Fútbol de Elviña
19	Celta B	1988	Vigo, Galicia	Barreiro
20	Sestao	1996	Sestao, Basque Country	Las Llanas

=== League table ===
Pos	Team	Pld	W	D	L	GF	GA	GD	Pts	Qualification or relegation
1	Ponferradina (C, O)	38	21	12	5	44	21	+23	75	Qualification to group champions' playoffs
2	Eibar	38	19	9	10	45	34	+11	66	Qualification to promotion playoffs
3	Palencia	38	16	17	5	46	27	+19	65	Qualification to promotion playoffs
4	Pontevedra	38	18	9	11	48	37	+11	63	Qualification to promotion playoffs
5	Alavés	38	16	14	8	45	31	+14	62	Qualification to Copa del Rey
6	Lemona	38	13	14	11	51	32	+19	53	
7	Lugo	38	13	14	11	49	41	+8	53	
8	Osasuna B	38	13	13	12	38	43	−5	52	
9	Celta B	38	15	6	17	53	61	−8	51	
10	Montañeros	38	13	10	15	47	49	−2	49	
11	Barakaldo	38	12	13	13	40	43	−3	49	
12	Cultural Leonesa	38	12	13	13	46	49	−3	49	
13	Mirandés	38	11	15	12	44	42	+2	48	
14	Zamora	38	12	10	16	39	51	−12	46	
15	Bilbao Athletic	38	12	10	16	35	42	−7	46	
16	Guijuelo	38	10	15	13	38	36	+2	45	Qualification to relegation playoffs
17	Sestao River (R)	38	11	11	16	32	40	−8	44	Relegation to Tercera División
18	Izarra (R)	38	10	9	19	41	50	−9	39	Relegation to Tercera División
19	Racing Ferrol (R)	38	7	16	15	31	43	−12	37	Relegation to Tercera División
20	Compostela (R)	38	7	8	23	36	66	−30	29 (Note: SD Compostela was relegated to Preferente Autonómica de Galicia for not paying its players.)	Relegation to Tercera División

Source: BDFutbol
Rules for classification: 1st points; 2nd head-to-head; 3rd goal difference; 4th goals scored
(C) Champions; (O) Promoted through playoff; (R) Relegated

=== Results ===
Home \ Away	ALV	BAR	BAT	CEL	COM	CDL	EIB	GUJ	IZA	LEM	LUG	MIR	MON	OSA	PAL	PNF	PON	RFE	SRC	ZAM
Alavés	—	2–0	3–1	1–1	3–0	3–0	0–1	0–0	2–1	1–1	1–1	1–2	2–2	3–3	1–1	0–0	0–1	1–0	2–0	1–0
Barakaldo	2–0	—	3–2	1–2	2–1	1–0	0–1	1–0	1–1	0–0	0–1	1–0	2–1	2–1	1–1	1–1	0–1	0–0	3–0	3–0
Bilbao Ath.	0–2	1–2	—	1–0	3–1	1–1	0–1	2–1	0–2	2–0	2–1	2–0	2–1	3–0	0–2	0–1	2–3	0–0	1–0	1–0
Celta B	0–1	2–0	2–0	—	2–0	2–2	1–0	2–1	3–2	1–2	1–1	1–1	5–2	2–2	1–0	0–1	1–3	0–2	2–1	0–1
Compostela	1–2	2–2	0–2	2–3	—	0–1	1–0	1–1	0–2	2–2	1–2	1–2	1–1	2–1	0–0	0–1	1–3	2–1	0–2	2–5
Cultural Leonesa	1–0	3–1	2–0	5–2	2–4	—	2–1	1–0	3–1	0–0	1–1	0–0	0–3	3–2	0–0	1–0	1–1	1–1	1–1	2–0
Eibar	1–2	1–0	3–0	3–2	2–2	2–0	—	1–1	2–1	3–2	2–2	1–0	1–0	0–1	2–1	2–2	1–0	1–0	1–0	2–0
Guijuelo	0–1	1–1	1–1	1–0	1–0	2–2	0–1	—	1–1	2–0	2–0	1–2	4–0	1–0	0–0	0–1	1–0	3–1	0–0	2–0
Izarra	0–0	3–0	1–1	1–2	2–0	1–0	1–2	2–0	—	1–2	1–1	1–2	2–0	1–2	1–1	2–1	1–2	1–1	0–1	4–0
Lemona	2–2	0–1	0–0	5–0	1–0	1–1	0–2	1–1	0–1	—	2–2	2–1	1–0	4–0	0–1	0–1	2–1	1–1	5–3	3–1
Lugo	0–0	4–2	1–0	0–1	2–1	0–0	3–0	1–1	4–1	0–2	—	1–1	0–1	0–0	3–0	0–0	2–4	0–1	0–1	1–0
Mirandés	1–2	1–1	0–1	0–2	1–2	2–2	1–1	2–2	2–0	1–1	3–1	—	2–2	1–3	0–0	1–1	2–1	0–0	0–0	4–0
Montañeros	0–0	3–1	1–1	2–0	3–0	1–0	1–1	2–1	3–0	2–2	1–2	2–1	—	2–0	0–0	1–2	1–1	1–0	0–2	1–1
Osasuna B	0–0	0–0	0–0	3–2	0–0	4–2	1–0	0–1	1–0	0–3	1–1	0–0	3–1	—	0–1	0–1	2–1	1–0	1–1	1–0
Palencia	2–1	1–1	1–1	3–3	2–0	1–0	1–1	2–2	4–1	2–0	1–1	1–2	1–0	2–0	—	1–0	1–0	1–0	1–0	2–2
Ponferradina	2–1	0–0	1–0	3–0	3–1	1–0	1–0	1–1	4–1	1–0	2–1	1–1	1–2	1–1	0–0	—	1–0	2–0	2–1	0–0
Pontevedra	0–1	1–0	0–0	3–2	1–2	2–0	1–0	3–1	1–0	2–0	0–5	2–1	0–2	1–1	2–0	0–0	—	0–0	0–0	0–0
Racing Ferrol	2–0	3–3	1–1	1–2	1–2	2–1	1–1	2–1	0–0	1–1	2–0	1–3	1–0	1–1	0–4	1–2	0–2	—	1–1	1–1
Sestao River	1–2	1–0	1–0	3–1	1–0	2–3	0–0	0–0	1–0	1–1	1–2	0–1	3–2	0–1	1–1	0–2	0–2	0–0	—	2–0
Zamora	1–1	1–1	3–1	1–0	1–1	3–2	3–1	1–0	0–0	1–2	1–2	1–0	3–0	0–1	0–3	1–0	3–3	2–1	2–0	—

Source: BDFutbol
Legend: Blue = home team win; Yellow = draw; Red = away team win.

=== Top goalscorers ===
Last updated 9 May 2010

Goalscorers	Goals	Team
(Spain) Jito	23	Cultural Leonesa
(Brazil) Charles	15	Pontevedra
(Spain) Jon Altuna	13	Eibar
(Spain) Álex López	13	Celta B
(Spain) Óscar Vega	12	Osasuna B

=== Top goalkeepers ===
Last updated 9 May 2010

Goalkeeper	Goals	Matches	Average	Team
(Spain) Alejandro Rebollo	27	37	0.73	Palencia
(Spain) David Montero	31	33	0.94	Guijuelo
(Spain) Orlando Quintana	37	38	0.97	Pontevedra
(Spain) Igor Etxebarrieta	31	30	1.03	Barakaldo
(Spain) Antonio Reguero	39	37	1.05	Racing Ferrol

== Group 2 ==
- Teams from Asturias, Canary Islands, Cantabria, Castile-La Mancha, Community of Madrid and Extremadura.

=== Summary before 2009–10 season ===
- Scores and Classification - Group 2
- Playoffs de Ascenso:
  - FC Cartagena - Promoted to Segunda División
  - Lorca Deportiva CF - Eliminated in Second Round
  - AD Alcorcón - Eliminated in Third Round
  - CD Leganés - Eliminated in First Round

- Promoted to this group from Tercera División:
  - Villanovense - Founded in: 1992//, Based in: Villanueva de la Serena, Extremadura//, Promoted From: Group 14
  - Tenerife B - Founded in: 1967//, Based in: Santa Cruz de Tenerife, Canary Islands//, Promoted From: Group 12
  - Gimnástica Torrelavega - Founded in: 1907//, Based in: Torrelavega, Cantabria//, Promoted From: Group 3
  - Cacereño - Founded in: 1919//, Based in: Cáceres, Extremadura//, Promoted From: Group 14
  - Oviedo - Founded in: 1926//, Based in: Oviedo, Asturias//, Promoted From: Group 2
  - CD Toledo - Founded in: 1928//, Based in: Toledo, Castile-La Mancha//, Promoted From: Group 18
  - Alcalá - Founded in: 1929//, Based in: Alcalá de Henares, Community of Madrid//, Promoted From: Group 7
  - Cerro Reyes Atlético - Founded in: 1980//, Based in: Badajoz, Extremadura//, Promoted From: Group 14

- Relegated to this group from Segunda División:
  - None

- Relegated to Tercera División:
  - Lorca - Founded in: 2002//, Based in: Lorca, Region of Murcia//, Relegated to: Group 13
  - Mérida - Founded in: 1990//, Based in: Mérida, Extremadura//, Relegated to: Group 14
  - Fuerteventura - Founded in: 2004//, Based in: Puerto del Rosario, Canary Islands//, Relegated to: Group 12
  - Las Palmas Atlético - Founded in: 1941//, Based in: Las Palmas, Canary Islands//, Relegated to: Group 12
  - Navalcarnero - Founded in: 1961//, Based in: Navalcarnero, Community of Madrid//, Relegated to: Group 7
  - Pájara Playas - Founded in: 1996//, Based in: Pájara, Canary Islands//, Relegated to: Group 12
  - Alfaro - Founded in: 1922//, Based in: Alfaro, La Rioja//, Relegated to: Group 16
  - V.S. Brígida - Founded in: 2004//, Based in: Santa Brígida, Canary Islands//, Relegated to: Group 12

=== Teams ===
Location of teams in Segunda División B Gr. 2 2009–10
Canary Islands

Group 2
	Team	Founded in	Based in	Ground
1	Gimnástica Torrelavega	1907	Torrelavega, Cantabria	El Malecón
2	Cacereño	1919	Cáceres, Extremadura	Príncipe Felipe
3	Racing B	1926	Santander, Cantabria	La Albericia
4	Oviedo	1926	Oviedo, Asturias	Carlos Tartiere
5	Leganés	1928	Leganés, Community of Madrid	Butarque
6	Toledo	1928	Toledo, Castile-La Mancha	Salto del Caballo
7	Alcalá	1929	Alcalá de Henares, Community of Madrid	El Val
8	Castilla	1930	Madrid, Community of Madrid	Alfredo di Stéfano
9	Vecindario	1942	Vecindario, Canary Islands	Municipal de Vecindario
10	Conquense	1946	Cuenca, Castile-La Mancha	La Fuensanta
11	Guadalajara	1947	Guadalajara, Castile-La Mancha	Pedro Escartín
12	Puertollano	1948	Puertollano, Castile-La Mancha	Francisco Sánchez Menor
13	Sporting B	1955	Gijón, Asturias	Mareo
14	Atlético B	1963	Madrid, Community of Madrid	Cerro del Espino
15	Tenerife B	1967	Santa Cruz de Tenerife, Canary Islands	Ciudad Deportiva de Geneto
16	Lanzarote	1970	Lanzarote, Canary Islands	Ciudad Deportiva de Lanzarote
17	Alcorcón	1971	Alcorcón, Community of Madrid	Santo Domingo
18	Cerro Reyes	1980	Badajoz, Extremadura	José Pache
19	Villanovense	1992	Villanueva de la Serena, Extremadura	Romero Cuerda
20	Universidad L.P.	1994	Las Palmas, Canary Islands	Pepe Gonçalves

=== League table ===
Pos	Team	Pld	W	D	L	GF	GA	GD	Pts	Qualification or relegation
1	Alcorcón (C, O)	38	21	10	7	50	30	+20	73	Qualification to group champions' playoffs
2	Oviedo	38	19	11	8	58	36	+22	68	Qualification to promotion playoffs
3	Guadalajara	38	17	13	8	53	36	+17	64	Qualification to promotion playoffs
4	Universidad LPGC	38	18	10	10	59	51	+8	64	Qualification to promotion playoffs
5	Leganés	38	17	11	10	54	45	+9	62	Qualification to Copa del Rey
6	Puertollano	38	17	11	10	47	39	+8	62	Qualification to Copa del Rey
7	Atlético B	38	16	10	12	64	44	+20	58	
8	Real Madrid Castilla	38	15	11	12	68	51	+17	56	
9	Gimnástica Torrelavega	38	14	9	15	40	35	+5	51	
10	Conquense	38	12	14	12	50	45	+5	50	
11	Vecindario	38	12	13	13	45	56	−11	49	
12	Sporting de Gijón B	38	13	8	17	40	52	−12	47	
13	Alcalá	38	11	11	16	40	52	−12	44	
14	Cerro Reyes	38	10	14	14	42	53	−11	44	
15	Cacereño	38	10	14	14	43	45	−2	44	
16	Toledo (R)	38	12	7	19	40	57	−17	43	Qualification to relegation playoffs
17	Racing Santander B (R)	38	10	11	17	36	49	−13	41	Relegation to Tercera División
18	Villanovense (R)	38	9	11	18	45	54	−9	38	Relegation to Tercera División
19	Tenerife B (R)	38	9	11	18	46	51	−5	38	Relegation to Tercera División
20	Lanzarote (R)	38	10	4	24	46	85	−39	34	Relegation to Tercera División

Source: BDFutbol
Rules for classification: 1st points; 2nd head-to-head; 3rd goal difference; 4th goals scored.
(C) Champions; (O) Promoted through playoff; (R) Relegated

=== Results ===
Home \ Away	ALCL	ALCR	ATM	CAC	CRB	CQS	TOR	GUA	LAN	LEG	PUE	RSB	RMC	ROV	SPG	TEN	TOL	ULP	VEC	VIL
Alcalá	—	0–0	0–0	1–0	2–2	2–0	0–0	0–0	3–2	0–0	0–2	0–1	2–3	1–0	1–2	1–0	2–1	1–2	1–2	1–1
Alcorcón	1–0	—	1–2	2–1	2–0	1–1	1–0	1–0	2–0	1–3	2–1	3–0	2–1	2–0	1–0	1–0	2–0	1–1	3–2	2–1
Atlético B	1–2	0–0	—	3–1	2–1	3–0	0–0	2–3	1–2	2–1	3–0	3–1	2–1	0–2	5–0	0–0	0–1	2–3	2–0	1–1
Cacereño	0–1	1–1	2–0	—	0–0	1–1	2–1	1–1	5–0	0–1	0–0	1–0	2–2	1–2	1–0	4–0	3–3	1–1	2–1	1–2
Cerro Reyes	2–0	3–2	1–0	1–2	—	2–1	1–2	1–3	2–1	4–1	2–4	1–1	0–3	2–2	0–1	2–2	0–0	3–1	0–1	2–1
Conquense	4–2	0–1	2–2	0–0	1–1	—	1–0	1–1	2–0	0–2	3–0	1–2	1–1	0–0	1–2	2–1	1–1	1–3	1–0	2–1
Gimnástica	0–1	0–0	2–0	2–0	0–0	0–0	—	1–2	5–0	1–0	1–0	0–1	2–2	0–1	1–0	2–1	0–1	1–0	1–1	4–0
Guadalajara	3–3	1–0	1–1	1–1	2–0	1–1	1–0	—	4–0	0–1	0–0	1–1	0–0	2–0	2–1	2–3	3–0	3–1	0–1	1–1
Lanzarote	2–1	1–1	0–4	2–1	1–2	1–3	2–1	1–2	—	1–2	0–1	3–0	3–4	0–2	3–3	2–2	2–1	2–1	3–1	2–1
Leganés	2–2	0–2	4–1	2–1	1–1	1–4	0–2	1–1	2–1	—	2–1	4–1	1–1	1–1	2–2	2–1	3–0	2–1	1–2	0–0
Puertollano	1–0	2–1	1–0	0–0	1–2	1–1	2–1	2–1	3–0	1–0	—	2–1	1–1	3–1	1–2	1–1	1–0	0–0	2–2	1–0
Racing B	1–2	0–2	0–0	2–0	0–0	1–0	0–0	0–1	3–0	1–4	2–3	—	1–0	0–1	2–0	1–1	3–0	1–1	1–1	3–0
RM Castilla	1–1	4–1	1–3	2–1	0–0	1–1	4–2	2–0	4–1	0–1	1–1	5–2	—	0–1	3–1	3–0	5–1	3–2	2–3	3–0
Real Oviedo	3–3	1–1	4–3	4–0	3–0	3–2	1–0	3–1	2–0	0–0	0–0	0–0	2–1	—	2–1	1–0	1–1	1–2	9–1	0–0
Sporting B	3–0	0–0	1–4	1–1	1–1	0–3	1–2	1–2	2–1	2–0	1–2	1–0	3–0	1–0	—	0–2	0–1	0–1	1–0	1–1
Tenerife B	5–1	0–1	0–2	1–2	3–0	1–0	0–2	0–1	2–2	3–0	1–1	2–0	2–2	1–0	0–1	—	0–1	1–1	4–1	1–1
Toledo	0–2	0–1	1–1	1–0	4–2	0–2	1–3	1–2	2–0	1–2	1–4	1–1	0–1	0–1	3–0	2–1	—	4–2	1–0	1–0
Universidad LPGC	2–0	1–0	3–6	0–0	0–0	4–3	3–1	2–1	1–3	1–1	2–1	2–1	2–0	3–0	1–1	4–3	2–1	—	0–1	2–1
Vecindario	1–0	1–1	0–2	2–2	1–1	1–2	0–0	1–1	3–1	1–1	1–0	2–0	2–1	2–2	1–1	2–1	1–1	0–0	—	2–3
Villanovense	2–1	2–4	1–1	1–2	1–0	1–1	5–0	0–2	4–1	1–3	3–0	1–1	1–0	1–2	1–2	0–0	3–2	0–1	2–1	—

Source: BDFutbol
Legend: Blue = home team win; Yellow = draw; Red = away team win.

=== Top goalscorers ===
Last updated 9 May 2010

Goalscorers	Goals	Team
(Spain) Airam López	27	Tenerife B
(Spain) Juanjo Serrano	21	Villanovense
(Spain) Quini Álvarez	20	Leganés
(Spain) Manu Busto	19	Oviedo
(Senegal) Matar Diop	16	Conquense

=== Top goalkeepers ===
Last updated 9 May 2010

Goalkeeper	Goals	Matches	Average	Team
(Spain) Juanma	22	32	0.69	Alcorcón
(Spain) Joel	21	27	0.78	Atlético B
(Spain) Iván Crespo	33	37	0.89	Gimnástica Torrelavega
(Spain) Oinatz Aulestia	36	37	0.97	Oviedo
(Uruguay) Álvaro Núñez	35	36	0.97	Guadalajara

== Group 3 ==
- Teams from Balearic Islands, Catalonia, La Rioja and Valencian Community.

=== Summary before 2009–10 season ===
- Scores and Classification - Group 3
- Playoffs de Ascenso:
  - CD Alcoyano - Eliminated in Second Round
  - Villarreal B - Promoted to Segunda División
  - UE Sant Andreu - Eliminated in First Round
  - CE Sabadell FC - Eliminated in Second Round

- Promoted to this group from Tercera División:
  - Logroñés - Founded in: 2009//, Based in: Logroño, La Rioja//, Special Exception: Takes seat of CD Varea.
  - Sporting Mahonés - Founded in: 1974//, Based in: Mahón, Balearic Islands//, Promoted From: Group 11
  - Espanyol B - Founded in: 1981//, Based in: Barcelona, Catalonia//, Promoted From: Group 5
  - Mallorca B - Founded in: 1983//, Based in: Palma de Mallorca, Balearic Islands//, Promoted From: Group 11

- Relegated to this group from Segunda División:
  - Alicante - Founded in: 1918//, Based in: Alicante, Valencian Community//, Relegated From: Segunda División

- Relegated to Tercera División:
  - Alzira - Founded in: 1946//, Based in: Alzira, Valencian Community//, Relegated to: Group 6
  - Eivissa - Founded in: 1995//, Based in: Ibiza Town, Balearic Islands//, Relegated to: Group 11
  - Santa Eulàlia - Founded in: 1935//, Based in: Santa Eulària des Riu, Balearic Islands//, Relegated to: Group 11
  - Atlético Baleares - Founded in: 1920//, Based in: Palma de Mallorca, Balearic Islands//, Relegated to: Group 11

=== Teams ===
Location of teams in Segunda División B Gr. 3 2009–10

Group 3
	Team	Founded in	Based in	Ground
1	Badalona	1903	Badalona, Catalonia	Camp del Centenari
2	Sabadell	1903	Sabadell, Catalonia	Nova Creu Alta
3	Terrassa	1906	Terrassa, Catalonia	Olímpic de Terrassa
4	Alicante	1918	Alicante, Valencian Community	José Rico Pérez
5	Gavà	1922	Gavà, Catalonia	La Bòbila
6	Sant Andreu	1925	Barcelona, Catalonia	Narcís Sala
7	Dénia	1927	Dénia, Valencian Community	Camp Nou de Dènia
8	Alcoyano	1929	Alcoyano, Valencian Community	El Collao
9	Lleida	1938	Lleida, Catalonia	Camp d'Esports
10	Valencia Mestalla	1944	Paterna, Valencian Community	Ciudad Deportiva de Paterna
11	Villajoyosa	1944	Villajoyosa, Valencian Community	Nou Pla
12	Gramenet	1945	Santa Coloma de Gramenet, Catalonia	Nou Municipal
13	Ontinyent	1947	Ontinyent, Valencian Community	El Clariano
14	Benidorm	1964	Benidorm, Valencian Community	Foietes
15	Barcelona Atlètic	1970	Barcelona, Catalonia	Mini Estadi
16	Sporting Mahonés	1974	Mahón, Balearic Islands	Bintaufa
17	Espanyol B	1981	Sant Adrià de Besòs, Catalonia	Ciutat Esportiva RCD Espanyol
18	Mallorca B	1983	Palma de Mallorca, Balearic Islands	Son Bibiloni
19	Orihuela	1993	Orihuela, Valencian Community	Los Arcos
20	Logroñés	2009	Logroño, La Rioja	Las Gaunas

=== League table ===
Pos	Team	Pld	W	D	L	GF	GA	GD	Pts	Qualification or relegation
1	Sant Andreu (C)	38	23	9	6	66	35	+31	78	Qualification to group champions' playoffs
2	Barcelona Atlètic (O)	38	22	10	6	65	35	+30	76	Qualification to promotion playoffs
3	Ontinyent	38	19	14	5	47	25	+22	71	Qualification to promotion playoffs
4	Alcoyano	38	20	9	9	52	32	+20	69	Qualification to promotion playoffs
5	Dénia	38	17	13	8	48	35	+13	64	Qualification to Copa del Rey
6	Benidorm	38	18	10	10	68	51	+17	64	Qualification to Copa del Rey
7	Orihuela	38	15	10	13	37	42	−5	55	Qualification to Copa del Rey
8	Mallorca B	38	15	10	13	49	39	+10	55	
9	Logroñés	38	13	15	10	41	33	+8	54	Qualification to Copa del Rey
10	Sabadell	38	13	10	15	42	45	−3	49	
11	Lleida	38	12	13	13	45	44	+1	49	
12	Badalona	38	13	9	16	40	44	−4	48	
13	Alicante	38	11	13	14	38	42	−4	46	
14	Sporting Mahonés	38	10	15	13	36	43	−7	45	
15	Gramenet	38	11	10	17	48	59	−11	43	
16	Espanyol B (R)	38	8	17	13	38	45	−7	41	Qualification to relegation playoffs
17	Villajoyosa (R)	38	7	13	18	41	52	−11	34	Relegation to Tercera División
18	Valencia Mestalla (R)	38	6	12	20	30	49	−19	30	Relegation to Tercera División
19	Gavà (R)	38	7	9	22	33	72	−39	30	Relegation to Tercera División
20	Terrassa (R)	38	6	7	25	29	71	−42	25	Relegation to Tercera División

Source: BDFutbol
Rules for classification: 1st points; 2nd head-to-head; 3rd goal difference; 4th goals scored.
(C) Champions; (O) Promoted through playoff; (R) Relegated

=== Results ===
Home \ Away	ALC	ALI	BAD	BAR	BEN	DEN	ESP	GAV	GRM	LLE	LOG	MAH	MLL	ONT	ORI	SAB	SAN	TER	VME	VJY
Alcoyano	—	2–0	1–0	0–0	0–3	4–0	1–0	1–0	1–0	1–2	0–1	2–0	1–0	2–2	1–0	2–2	3–1	3–0	3–0	1–0
Alicante	1–1	—	0–2	2–2	2–0	0–4	0–0	2–0	0–0	2–0	0–1	0–0	1–0	1–4	2–1	1–2	0–1	2–1	2–0	4–2
Badalona	0–0	2–0	—	3–0	0–1	0–2	1–1	3–3	0–4	3–0	1–3	3–0	1–0	0–2	0–2	0–1	1–2	2–0	1–1	1–1
Barcelona Atlètic	1–1	2–1	3–2	—	1–3	1–1	1–1	5–0	3–1	2–0	1–1	1–2	1–1	2–0	2–0	3–0	2–1	4–0	2–1	2–0
Benidorm	2–2	0–0	4–1	2–2	—	1–2	5–2	5–1	1–0	3–2	2–1	2–1	0–3	0–0	5–1	1–1	2–4	2–2	1–2	1–1
Dénia	2–0	2–0	2–0	1–0	2–1	—	1–0	3–0	2–2	0–3	0–0	1–0	2–2	1–0	3–1	2–1	0–0	3–0	1–0	1–1
Espanyol B	0–2	1–1	2–2	0–2	3–2	0–0	—	1–0	2–2	0–0	1–1	0–0	1–2	1–2	0–0	3–2	0–1	2–1	0–0	1–0
Gavà	2–4	0–1	0–0	1–3	1–2	0–0	4–1	—	2–1	1–5	0–2	2–1	0–2	2–1	1–2	0–3	0–0	2–1	0–0	2–1
Gramenet	2–1	1–1	2–0	1–2	1–1	3–0	1–1	0–2	—	1–0	1–1	2–1	1–0	1–3	1–3	1–0	0–5	4–2	3–1	3–1
Lleida	1–0	2–2	1–1	1–2	3–1	1–0	2–2	2–2	3–2	—	0–1	2–2	1–0	0–1	0–1	2–2	1–1	2–0	2–0	0–0
Logroñés	0–3	1–1	0–1	0–1	1–1	1–1	0–4	4–1	3–0	0–0	—	1–0	1–3	0–1	2–2	0–0	0–0	1–0	3–0	2–1
Sporting Mahonés	3–4	1–0	0–3	0–2	2–2	1–0	1–1	1–1	2–1	0–0	1–1	—	0–0	0–2	2–1	2–1	2–0	2–0	2–2	2–0
Mallorca B	2–0	0–0	1–2	1–0	1–3	1–1	2–1	4–1	4–1	2–0	0–2	1–0	—	1–1	1–1	1–1	3–2	1–0	1–3	1–0
Ontinyent	0–1	1–0	0–0	0–0	2–1	3–1	1–1	1–1	1–0	2–0	0–0	0–0	0–0	—	2–0	1–0	2–0	2–1	2–1	2–0
Orihuela	0–0	0–2	1–0	1–2	0–1	2–0	0–0	1–0	1–0	0–0	0–3	1–1	2–1	1–1	—	1–0	1–3	2–1	1–0	1–1
Sabadell	1–1	1–0	0–1	2–3	1–2	0–0	1–0	2–0	3–1	1–0	0–0	1–0	1–4	1–1	1–2	—	1–0	2–0	2–1	2–0
Sant Andreu	3–0	3–2	3–1	3–2	3–1	2–1	1–0	2–0	2–0	5–1	2–2	1–1	0–0	2–0	0–0	2–1	—	1–0	1–0	2–2
Terrassa	0–2	1–4	1–0	0–1	0–2	1–3	0–4	1–0	0–0	0–3	1–0	1–1	3–2	2–2	2–1	1–1	1–3	—	2–1	1–1
Valencia Mestalla	0–1	1–1	0–1	1–1	0–1	1–1	0–1	1–1	2–2	0–0	1–0	1–2	1–0	0–0	0–1	3–0	2–3	1–0	—	0–2
Villajoyosa	1–0	0–0	1–2	0–1	0–1	2–2	3–0	3–0	2–2	1–3	2–1	0–0	3–1	1–2	1–2	3–1	0–1	2–2	2–2	—

Source: BDFutbol
Legend: Blue = home team win; Yellow = draw; Red = away team win.

=== Top goalscorers ===
Last updated 9 May 2010

Goalscorers	Goals	Team
(Spain) Máyor	22	Sant Andreu
(Spain) Luismi	21	Benidorm
(Spain) Víctor Curto	20	Alcoyano
(Spain) Jonathan Soriano	18	Barcelona Atlètic
(Spain) Guillem Martí	17	Sporting Mahonés

=== Top goalkeepers ===
Last updated 9 May 2010

Goalkeeper	Goals	Matches	Average	Team
(Spain) David Rangel	25	38	0.66	Ontinyent
(Spain) Manuel Rubio	27	35	0.77	Logroñés
(Spain) José Miguel Morales	30	36	0.83	Sant Andreu
(Spain) Fernando Maestro	32	38	0.84	Alcoyano
(Spain) Iván Vidal	35	37	0.95	Dénia

== Group 4 ==
- Teams from Andalusia, Ceuta, Melilla and Region of Murcia.

=== Summary before 2009–10 season ===
- Scores and Classification - Group 4
- Playoffs de Ascenso:
  - Cádiz CF - Promoted to Segunda División
  - Real Jaén - Eliminated in Third Round
  - Polideportivo Ejido - Eliminated in First Round
  - UD Marbella - Eliminated in First Round

- Promoted to this group from Tercera División:
  - Moratalla - Founded in: 1979//, Based in: Moratalla, Region of Murcia, Promoted From: Group 13
  - Jerez Industrial - Founded in: 1951//, Based in: Jerez de la Frontera, Andalusia, Promoted From: Group 10
  - Caravaca - Founded in: 1969//, Based in: Caravaca de la Cruz, Region of Murcia//, Promoted From: Group 13
  - San Roque - Founded in: 1956//, Based in: Lepe, Andalusia//, Promoted From: Group 10
  - Unión Estepona - Founded in: 1995//, Based in: Estepona, Andalusia//, Promoted From: Group 9

- Relegated to this group from Segunda División:
  - Sevilla Atlético - Founded in: 1958//, Based in: Sevilla, Andalusia//, Relegated From: Segunda División

- Relegated to Tercera División:
  - Antequera - Founded in: 1992//, Based in: Antequera, Andalusia//, Relegated to: Group 9
  - San Fernando - Founded in: 1943//, Based in: San Fernando, Andalusia//, Relegated to: Group 10
  - Granada 74 - Founded in: 2007//, Based in: Pinos Puente, Andalusia//, Relegated to: Group 9
  - Linense - Founded in: 1912//, Based in: La Línea de la Concepción, Andalusia//, Relegated to: Group 10
  - Portuense - Founded in: 1928//, Based in: El Puerto de Santa María, Andalusia//, Relegated to: Group 10

=== Teams ===
Location of teams in Segunda División B Gr. 4 2009–10

Group 4
	Team	Founded in	Based in	Ground
1	Real Jaén	1922	Jaén, Andalusia	Nuevo La Victoria
2	Murcia Imperial	1924	Murcia, Region of Murcia	Nueva Condomina
3	Águilas	1925	Águilas, Region of Murcia	El Rubial
4	Granada	1931	Granada, Andalusia	Nuevo Los Cármenes
5	Roquetas	1933	Roquetas de Mar, Andalusia	Antonio Peroles
6	Jerez Industrial	1951	Jerez de la Frontera, Andalusia	De la Juventud
7	San Roque	1956	Lepe, Andalusia	Ciudad de Lepe
8	Sevilla Atl.	1958	Sevilla, Andalusia	José Ramón Cisneros Palacios
9	Betis B	1962	Seville, Andalusia	Ciudad Deportiva Ruíz de Lopera
10	Écija	1968	Ecija, Andalusia	San Pablo
11	Lucena	1968	Lucena, Andalusia	Ciudad Deportiva
12	Caravaca	1969	Caravaca de la Cruz, Region of Murcia	Antonio Martínez El Morao
13	Poli Ejido	1969	El Ejido, Andalusia	Santo Domingo
14	Melilla	1976	Melilla	Álvarez Claro
15	Moratalla	1979	Moratalla Region of Murcia	Casa Felipe
16	Unión Estepona	1995	Estepona, Andalusia	Francisco Muñoz Pérez
17	Ceuta	1996	Ceuta	Alfonso Murube
18	Sangonera Atlético	1996	Sangonera la verde, Region of Murcia	El Mayayo
19	Marbella	1997	Marbella, Andalusia	Municipal de Marbella
20	Atlético Ciudad	2007	Lorquí, Region of Murcia	Juan de la Cierva

=== League table ===
Pos	Team	Pld	W	D	L	GF	GA	GD	Pts	Qualification or relegation
1	Granada (C, O)	38	23	7	8	74	37	+37	76	Qualification to group champions' playoffs
2	Melilla	38	22	10	6	55	37	+18	76	Qualification to promotion playoffs
3	Real Jaén	38	20	9	9	58	32	+26	69	Qualification to promotion playoffs
4	Poli Ejido	38	19	8	11	47	28	+19	65	Qualification to promotion playoffs
5	Ceuta	38	17	10	11	56	44	+12	61	Qualification to Copa del Rey
6	Lucena	38	14	13	11	58	39	+19	55	Qualification to Copa del Rey
7	Atlético Ciudad (Note: CF Atlético Ciudad was dissolved after the end of the season.) (D)	38	16	5	17	48	55	−7	53	
8	San Roque	38	15	8	15	54	47	+7	53	
9	Unión Estepona	38	14	10	14	48	50	−2	52	
10	Caravaca	38	13	13	12	47	44	+3	52	
11	Écija	38	15	7	16	54	52	+2	52	
12	Sangonera (Note: Sangonera Atlético fused with Lorca Atlético after the end of the season.)	38	13	12	13	51	55	−4	51	
13	Real Murcia B (R)	38	13	12	13	45	45	0	51 (Note: Real Murcia B was relegated to Tercera División due to Real Murcia's relegation to Segunda División B.)	
14	Real Betis B	38	13	12	13	39	37	+2	51	
15	Sevilla Atlético	38	15	6	17	41	42	−1	51	
16	Roquetas	38	14	8	16	44	46	−2	50	Qualification to relegation playoffs
17	Moratalla (R)	38	10	12	16	36	48	−12	42	Relegation to Tercera División
18	Jerez Industrial (R)	38	10	5	23	33	73	−40	35	Relegation to Tercera División
19	Marbella (R)	38	7	10	21	36	62	−26	31	Relegation to Tercera División
20	Águilas (Note: Águilas CF was dissolved after the end of the season.) (D)	38	4	9	25	28	79	−51	21	Relegation to Tercera División

Source: BDFutbol
Rules for classification: 1st points; 2nd head-to-head; 3rd goal difference; 4th goals scored.
(C) Champions; (D) Dissolved; (O) Promoted through playoff; (R) Relegated

=== Results ===
Home \ Away	ÁGU	CAR	CEU	CIU	ECJ	EST	GRA	JIN	LUC	MAR	MEL	MOR	PLD	RBB	RJN	RMB	ROQ	SAN	SRQ	SAT
Águilas	—	0–1	0–2	1–1	0–1	0–1	1–2	1–2	1–1	0–2	0–0	2–3	2–1	1–0	2–2	0–0	0–2	1–2	2–1	0–2
Caravaca	7–0	—	1–1	4–0	2–1	0–0	0–1	1–0	2–1	1–0	1–0	2–1	0–0	4–2	0–0	0–3	0–5	1–1	1–1	2–0
Ceuta	2–0	1–1	—	2–1	4–1	1–1	2–1	6–0	1–0	1–0	1–2	2–0	0–3	0–1	1–0	4–0	3–0	0–1	3–2	2–2
Atlético Ciudad	2–1	3–1	0–1	—	2–0	4–2	0–1	1–0	0–2	2–1	0–1	5–2	0–1	2–1	3–2	2–1	1–0	0–2	2–0	0–0
Écija	2–1	3–2	1–1	1–3	—	1–2	0–0	6–2	1–1	1–0	1–2	1–0	0–3	1–1	2–0	2–1	1–1	4–0	3–0	2–1
Unión Estepona	2–0	4–0	4–2	2–5	1–2	—	0–4	3–1	1–1	1–0	1–2	0–0	0–0	1–1	1–2	1–1	2–1	3–2	3–0	2–1
Granada	7–1	1–0	2–1	3–0	4–1	3–2	—	4–1	1–0	5–2	5–1	2–1	0–0	1–1	2–0	3–1	2–1	2–0	2–2	2–1
Jerez Industrial	3–2	1–0	0–0	1–1	3–1	0–2	0–3	—	0–0	1–2	1–3	0–1	0–1	2–1	0–1	0–0	0–2	3–2	2–6	1–0
Lucena	6–0	2–2	1–1	1–2	3–2	1–0	3–1	2–0	—	3–0	2–1	3–1	1–2	0–0	2–1	1–1	1–1	3–0	3–2	3–1
Marbella	3–3	1–3	1–1	0–1	1–1	1–0	3–1	1–2	0–3	—	0–0	0–2	1–2	2–2	0–4	0–1	1–2	5–2	1–5	0–2
Melilla	2–0	1–0	2–0	1–1	2–1	0–0	1–1	1–0	2–2	1–1	—	3–0	0–0	0–0	2–1	1–0	3–1	2–1	2–1	1–0
Moratalla	3–3	0–0	2–0	2–0	0–1	0–0	1–3	1–2	2–1	0–1	2–2	—	0–1	2–0	0–1	2–2	2–1	0–0	1–1	2–1
Poli Ejido	3–0	1–0	1–2	2–0	1–0	0–2	1–1	3–0	2–1	2–2	3–1	2–0	—	2–0	1–0	0–0	0–1	3–0	0–2	0–1
Real Betis B	3–0	1–0	2–1	2–0	1–3	0–0	0–0	0–1	0–0	1–0	5–0	0–0	2–0	—	2–0	1–0	1–0	0–0	3–0	2–0
Real Jaén	3–1	1–1	2–2	3–0	1–0	4–0	2–0	3–1	0–0	3–2	0–1	1–1	2–1	2–0	—	2–2	1–0	2–0	1–0	2–1
Real Murcia B	0–0	1–1	3–0	3–1	0–4	0–2	0–1	3–0	1–0	2–0	0–2	2–0	1–2	2–0	0–0	—	2–1	1–1	1–1	3–1
Roquetas	1–1	2–2	0–1	2–0	1–1	2–0	1–0	3–2	2–1	1–1	2–4	2–0	1–1	0–0	0–3	0–2	—	2–1	2–0	1–0
Sangonera	2–0	2–2	1–2	1–0	1–0	4–2	3–2	0–0	3–3	0–0	1–4	0–0	2–1	5–2	1–1	5–1	3–0	—	0–0	2–1
San Roque	2–0	0–2	3–0	2–2	1–0	3–0	1–0	3–1	1–0	0–1	2–1	1–2	2–1	3–0	0–3	3–0	2–0	0–0	—	0–1
Sevilla Atlético	0–1	2–0	2–2	3–1	3–1	1–0	2–1	3–0	1–0	0–0	0–1	0–0	1–0	2–1	0–2	1–4	1–0	2–0	1–1	—

Source: BDFutbol
Legend: Blue = home team win; Yellow = draw; Red = away team win.

=== Top goalscorers ===
Last updated 9 May 2010

Goalscorers	Goals	Team
(Spain) Joaquín Rodríguez	20	San Roque
(United Arab Emirates) Tariq Spezie	19	Granada
(Nigeria) Odion Ighalo	16	Granada
(Spain) Enrique Carreño	15	Sevilla Atlético
(Spain) Andrés Ramos	15	Melilla

=== Top goalkeepers ===
Last updated 9 May 2010

Goalkeeper	Goals	Matches	Average	Team
(Spain) David Valle	16	27	0.59	Poli Ejido
(Spain) Toni García	25	28	0.89	Lucena
(Spain) Pedro Dorronsoro	34	35	0.97	Melilla
(Spain) Óscar Fornés	41	36	1.14	Caravaca
(Spain) Isaac García	40	34	1.18	San Roque
