= Jordi Vinyals =

Spanish footballer and manager

Personal information
- Full name: Jordi Vinyals Martori
- Date of birth: 24 November 1963 (age 62)
- Place of birth: Cardedeu, Spain
- Height: 1.80 m (5 ft 11 in)
- Position: Midfielder

Team information
- Current team: Yunnan Yukun (manager)

Youth career
- Cardedeu
- 1978–1982: Barcelona

Senior career*
Years	Team	Apps	(Gls)
1982–1984	Barcelona C		
1984–1988	Barcelona B	82	(7)
1987–1988	→ Sabadell (loan)	25	(1)
1988–1989	Castellón	34	(6)
1989–1990	Oviedo	34	(7)
1990–1991	Betis	27	(0)
1991–1994	Oviedo	68	(8)
1994–1996	Villarreal	68	(5)
1996–1997	Terrassa	35	(5)
1997–1999	Figueres	55	(6)
Total		428	(45)

International career
1981	Spain U18	6	(0)

Managerial career
- 2000–2003: Villarreal B
- 2003: Palamós
- 2003–2004: Gimnàstic
- 2004–2005: Algeciras
- 2005–2006: Terrassa
- 2006–2007: Jaén
- 2007–2008: Castelldefels
- 2009–2010: Hospitalet
- 2010: Castellón
- 2011–2012: Hospitalet
- 2012–2015: Barcelona (youth)
- 2015: Barcelona B
- 2015–2019: Qingdao Huanghai
- 2021–2024: Zhejiang
- 2026–: Yunnan Yukun
- * Club domestic league appearances and goals

Jordi Vinyals Martori (Catalan pronunciation: [ˈʒɔɾði βiˈɲals]; (Note: In isolation, Vinyals is pronounced [biˈɲals].) born 24 November 1963) is a Spanish former professional footballer who played as a midfielder. He is currently manager of Chinese Super League club Yunnan Yukun.

== Playing career ==
Born in Cardedeu, Barcelona, Catalonia, Vinyals was a youth product of FC Barcelona. He totalled 154 games in La Liga over six seasons, in representation of CE Sabadell FC, Real Oviedo (two spells) and Real Betis. In the 1991–92 UEFA Cup, he played both legs of the first-round exit against Genoa CFC (3–2 on aggregate); in 1989–90's top division, also as a member of Oviedo, he scored a career-best seven of his 16 goals in the competition.

Vinyals was part of a CD Castellón squad that won the Segunda División in the 1988–89 campaign. To this feat, he contributed 34 matches and six goals in more than 3,000 minutes of action.

Vinyals retired at the end of 1998–99 with Segunda División B club UE Figueres, aged 35.

== Coaching career ==
Vinyals started his managerial career in 2000, leading Villarreal CF B to promotion from the regional leagues. He repeated the feat in the 2003–04 season, with Gimnàstic de Tarragona in the third tier.

In the following years, Vinyals continued to coach in the lower leagues. In the 2009–10 campaign, his CE L'Hospitalet side promoted to the third division via the playoffs after beating UD Almería B on the away goals rule.

On 8 February 2015 Vinyals, who was in charge of the under-19s, took over from Eusebio Sacristán at the helm of Barcelona's reserves. He only managed two wins in his 18 games in charge, being himself dismissed following second-tier relegation as last.

Vinyals subsequently worked in China, with Qingdao Huanghai and Zhejiang FC. In 2019, he won the League One with the former and thus achieved promotion to the Super League even though he was fired shortly before the end of the season and replaced by his compatriot Juan Manuel Lillo; he repeated the feat in 2021 with the latter, this time through the playoffs where they bested precisely Qingdao.

On 3 January 2026, Vinyals was named head coach of Yunnan Yukun F.C. in the Chinese top flight.

== Managerial statistics ==
As of 12 December 2023

Managerial record by team and tenure
Team	From	To	Record							
Team	From	To	G	W	D	L	GF	GA	GD	Win %
Villarreal B	1 July 2000	30 June 2001	30	26	2	2	142	34	+108	86.67
Palamós	1 February 2003	10 February 2003	1	0	1	0	1	1	+0	0.00
Gimnàstic	1 July 2003	30 June 2004	44	22	12	10	66	39	+27	50.00
Algeciras	20 December 2004	30 June 2005	21	7	7	7	16	19	−3	33.33
Terrassa	1 July 2005	26 February 2006	26	10	6	10	32	25	+7	38.46
Jaén	1 July 2006	30 June 2007	38	16	14	8	49	40	+9	42.11
Castelldefels	17 December 2007	30 June 2008	21	7	7	7	23	25	−2	33.33
Hospitalet	1 July 2009	30 June 2010	44	26	15	3	80	21	+59	59.09
Castellón	1 July 2010	25 October 2010	12	4	1	7	15	19	−4	33.33
Hospitalet	1 July 2011	30 June 2012	43	20	11	12	54	47	+7	46.51
Barcelona B	8 February 2015	30 June 2015	18	2	4	12	23	40	−17	11.11
Qingdao Huanghai	28 December 2015	30 July 2019	63	36	6	21	110	86	+24	57.14
Zhejiang	1 January 2021	31 December 2024	117	67	28	22	224	95	+129	57.26
Total			448	227	110	111	781	477	+304	50.67

== Honours ==
=== Player ===
Castellón

- Segunda División: 1988–89

=== Manager ===
Qingdao Huanghai

- China League One: 2019
