= 2008 Segunda División B play-offs =

Spanish football league play-offs

The 2008 Segunda División B play-offs (Playoffs de Ascenso or Promoción de Ascenso) were the final playoffs for promotion from 2007–08 Segunda División B to the 2008–09 Segunda División. The four first placed teams in each of the four Segunda División B groups played the Playoffs de Ascenso and the four last placed teams in Segunda División were relegated to Segunda División B. It also decided the two teams which placed 16th to be relegated to the 2008–09 Tercera División.

The top four placed teams from each group in the Segunda División B played in the Liguilla de Ascenso. Each liguilla contained one team from each of the four regular season groups. Teams were then drawn to play one another with the 1st placed team in each group playing the 4th placed team, and the 2nd placed playing 3rd. The winners of these ties then played each other with the winning team being promoted.

The teams finishing 16th in each group of the Segunda División B were drawn into 2 pairs, with the losing teams relegated to the Tercera División.

All ties were two-legged, with each team playing once at home. The winner of each tie was determined by aggregate score, with draws being separated by the away goals rule or a penalty shoot-out where necessary.

== Promotion play-offs ==
The regular season finished on the 18 May and the play-offs began on the 24 May and 25 May.

=== Group A ===
Group	Place	Team
1	1st	Rayo Vallecano
2	3rd	Zamora
3	4th	Benidorm
4	2nd	Linares

==== Semifinals ====
Team 1	Agg.	Team 2	1st leg	2nd leg
Zamora	3–2	Linares	1–1	2–1
Benidorm	1–2	Rayo Vallecano	1–1	0–1

==== Final ====
Team 1	Agg.	Team 2	1st leg	2nd leg
Zamora	1–2	Rayo Vallecano	0–1	1–1

Promoted to Segunda División
Rayo Vallecano
(4 years later)

=== Group B ===
Group	Place	Team
1	3rd	Fuerteventura
2	1st	Ponferradina
3	4th	Alicante
4	2nd	Mérida

==== Semifinals ====
Team 1	Agg.	Team 2	1st leg	2nd leg
Mérida	2–3	Ponferradina	1–2	1–1
Fuerteventura	0–3	Alicante	0–0	0–3

==== Final ====
Team 1	Agg.	Team 2	1st leg	2nd leg
Alicante	2–1	Ponferradina	2–0	0–1

Promoted to Segunda División
Alicante
(50 years later)

=== Group C ===
Group	Place	Team
1	4th	Deportivo B
2	2nd	Huesca
3	3rd	Gavà
4	1st	Écija

==== Semifinals ====
Team 1	Agg.	Team 2	1st leg	2nd leg
Deportivo B	1–3	Écija	1–0	0–3
Gavà	3–3 (a)	Huesca	2–2	1–1

==== Final ====
Team 1	Agg.	Team 2	1st leg	2nd leg
Huesca	3-1	Écija	2-0	1-1

Promoted to Segunda División
Huesca
(First time ever)

=== Group D ===
Group	Place	Team
1	2nd	Pontevedra
2	4th	Barakaldo
3	1st	Girona
4	3rd	Ceuta

==== Semifinals ====
Team 1	Agg.	Team 2	1st leg	2nd leg
Ceuta	3–2	Pontevedra	1–1	2–1
Barakaldo	0–2	Girona	0–0	0–2

==== Final ====
Team 1	Agg.	Team 2	1st leg	2nd leg
Ceuta	0–1	Girona	0–0	0–1

Promoted to Segunda División
Girona
(49 years later)

== Relegation play-off ==
=== Qualified teams ===
Group	Position	Team
1	16th	Villa Santa Brígida
2	16th	Osasuna B
3	16th	Villajoyosa
4	16th	Baza

=== Matches ===
The losers of this tournament will be relegated to the 2008-09 Tercera División.

Team 1	Agg.	Team 2	1st leg	2nd leg
Baza	0–0 (1–3 p)	Villa Santa Brígida	0–0	0–0
Osasuna B	2–1	Villajoyosa	1–1	1–0

Relegated to Tercera División
Baza	Villajoyosa
