= 2007–08 Segunda División B =

Segunda División B
- Season: 2007–08
- Champions: Rayo Vallecano; Ponferradina; Girona; Écija
- Promoted: Rayo Vallecano; Alicante; Huesca; Girona

The Segunda División B 2007–08 season was the 31st since its establishment. The first matches of the season were played on 25 August 2007, and the season ended on 15 June 2008 with the promotion play-off finals.

== Group 1 ==
- Teams from Community of Madrid, Galicia, Asturias and Canary Islands.

=== Summary before 2007–08 season ===
- Scores and Classification - Group 2
- Liguilla de Ascenso:
  - Pontevedra CF - Eliminated in First Round
  - Rayo Vallecano - Eliminated in Second Round
  - Racing de Ferrol - Promoted to Segunda División
  - Universidad de Las Palmas - Eliminated in First Round

- Promoted to this group from Tercera División:
  - Deportivo B - Founded in: 1953//, Based in: A Coruña, Galicia//, Promoted From: Group 1
  - CD San Isidro - Founded in: 1970//, Based in: San Isidro, Canary Islands//, Promoted From: Group 12
  - UD Villa de Santa Brígida - Founded in: 2004//, Based in: Santa Brígida, Canary Islands//, Promoted From: Group 12
  - UD Fuerteventura - Founded in: 2004//, Based in: Puerto del Rosario, Canary Islands//, Promoted From: Group 12

- Relegated to this group from Segunda División:
  - UD Vecindario - Founded in: 1942//, Based in: Vecindario, Canary Islands//, Relegated From: Segunda División
  - Real Madrid Castilla - Founded in: 1943//, Based in: Madrid, Community of Madrid//, Relegated From: Segunda División

- Relegated to Tercera División:
  - Racing B - Founded in: 1992//, Based in: Santander, Cantabria//, Relegated to: Group 3
  - Orientación Marítima - Founded in: 1954//, Based in: Arrecife, Canary Islands//, Relegated to: Group 12
  - CD Cobeña - Founded in: 1998//, Based in: Cobeña, Community of Madrid//, Relegated to: Group 7
  - Gimnástica Torrelavega - Founded in: 1907//, Based in: Torrelavega, Cantabria//, Relegated to: Group 3

=== Teams ===
Location of teams in Segunda División B Gr. 1 2007–08
Canary Islands

Group 1
	Team	Founded in	Based in	Ground
1	Rayo Vallecano	1924	Vallecas, Madrid	Teresa Rivero
2	Leganés	1928	Leganés, Madrid	Butarque
3	Castilla	1930	Madrid, Madrid	Alfredo di Stéfano
4	Marino	1931	Luanco, Asturias	Miramar
5	Pontevedra	1941	Pontevedra, Galicia	Pasarón
6	Vecindario	1942	Vecindario, Canary Islands	Municipal de Vecindario
7	Ourense	1952	Ourense, Galicia	O Couto
8	Lugo	1953	Lugo, Galicia	Anxo Carro
9	Deportivo B	1964	A Coruña, Galicia	Abegondo
10	Atlético B	1970	Madrid, Madrid	Cerro del Espino
11	Lanzarote	1970	Lanzarote, Canary Islands	Ciudad Deportiva de Lanzarote
12	San Isidro	1970	San Isidro, Canary Islands	La Palmera
13	Alcorcón	1971	Alcorcón, Madrid	Santo Domingo
14	S.S. Reyes	1971	San Sebastián de los Reyes, Madrid	Nuevo Matapiñonera
15	Fuenlabrada	1975	Fuenlabrada, Madrid	La Aldehuela
16	Celta B	1988	Vigo, Galicia	Barreiro
17	Universidad L.P.	1994	Las Palmas, Canary Islands	Pepe Gonçalvez
18	Pájara Playas	1996	Pájara, Canary Islands	Alfonso Silva
19	UD Fuerteventura	2004	Puerto del Rosario, Canary Islands	Los Pozos
20	V.S. Brígida	2004	Santa Brígida, Canary Islands	Los Olivos

=== League table ===
Pos	Team	Pld	W	D	L	GF	GA	GD	Pts	Qualification or relegation
1	Rayo Vallecano (C, O)	38	20	10	8	66	31	+35	70	Qualification to promotion playoffs
2	Pontevedra	38	18	13	7	52	29	+23	67	Qualification to promotion playoffs
3	Fuerteventura	38	18	9	11	50	45	+5	63	Qualification to promotion playoffs
4	Deportivo B	38	17	11	10	46	33	+13	62	Qualification to promotion playoffs
5	RM Castilla	38	17	10	11	60	42	+18	61	
6	Universidad LPGC	38	16	13	9	45	32	+13	61	Qualification to Copa del Rey
7	Lugo	38	17	9	12	51	49	+2	60	Qualification to Copa del Rey
8	Celta B	38	16	8	14	56	50	+6	56	
9	Pájara PJ	38	14	11	13	36	41	−5	53	
10	Atlético B	38	12	16	10	49	55	−6	52	
11	Vecindario	38	15	6	17	52	44	+8	51	
12	Leganés	38	13	12	13	43	44	−1	51	
13	Lanzarote	38	13	11	14	43	46	−3	50	
14	Alcorcón	38	13	9	16	38	39	−1	48	
15	Marino	38	12	10	16	31	42	−11	46	
16	Villa Sta. Brígida	38	11	13	14	39	45	−6	46	Qualification to relegation playoffs
17	Ourense (R)	38	11	13	14	36	46	−10	46	Relegation to Tercera División
18	Fuenlabrada (R)	38	6	15	17	29	48	−19	33	Relegation to Tercera División
19	SS Reyes (R)	38	7	10	21	23	50	−27	31	Relegation to Tercera División
20	San Isidro (R)	38	6	7	25	41	75	−34	25 (Note: San Isidro was relegated to Preferente de las Islas Canarias for not paying its players.)	Relegation to Tercera División

Rules for classification: 1st points; 2nd head-to-head; 3rd goal difference; 4th goals scored.
(C) Champions; (O) Promoted through playoff; (R) Relegated

=== Results ===
Home \ Away	ALC	ATL	CEL	DEP	FUN	FUR	LAN	LEG	LUG	MAR	OUR	PAJ	PON	RAY	RMA	SAI	SAS	UPG	VEC	VSB
Alcorcón	—	1–2	1–0	0–0	2–1	1–0	1–2	2–2	1–2	2–1	1–0	0–1	1–1	0–0	1–1	1–1	2–0	0–0	3–0	1–0
Atlético B	2–0	—	3–2	0–2	1–1	2–3	0–0	0–0	3–1	2–2	2–2	1–1	1–1	3–2	1–1	3–1	0–0	1–0	1–0	3–1
Celta B	1–0	5–1	—	3–1	2–0	1–1	1–1	2–4	2–1	3–0	1–0	1–0	0–2	3–2	3–1	2–0	3–0	1–1	1–1	3–1
Deportivo B	0–1	1–1	2–1	—	1–1	3–2	1–2	3–1	1–1	0–0	4–2	1–0	1–1	3–1	1–0	3–1	1–0	1–1	2–0	1–0
Fuenlabrada	1–1	1–1	0–1	0–0	—	3–0	0–2	0–1	1–1	1–1	1–1	1–0	2–4	2–0	0–2	1–0	0–0	0–0	0–0	0–2
Fuerteventura	1–0	3–2	2–2	2–1	1–1	—	2–1	0–0	2–0	2–1	1–1	2–2	0–0	0–3	1–2	2–1	1–0	1–0	2–0	1–3
Lanzarote	1–0	3–3	2–0	0–0	1–1	0–1	—	1–0	1–2	2–1	0–1	1–2	1–3	1–1	3–1	3–1	1–1	2–0	1–1	1–1
Leganés	3–1	0–3	1–0	0–0	3–1	3–1	1–2	—	1–0	1–1	1–1	0–1	3–2	0–0	0–0	3–1	2–0	0–0	2–1	1–1
Lugo	1–0	1–1	3–2	3–1	0–1	0–1	2–0	2–0	—	2–0	1–0	0–0	1–0	2–1	1–4	3–3	2–0	3–1	4–1	2–2
Marino	3–1	0–1	1–0	1–0	1–0	0–1	2–0	1–1	1–0	—	2–0	2–1	0–1	0–2	0–1	1–0	0–0	0–1	1–0	2–0
Ourense	1–0	0–0	1–1	0–1	1–0	3–1	1–0	3–2	0–1	0–0	—	1–0	1–0	0–1	1–2	3–1	3–1	2–2	1–1	0–0
Pájara PJ	0–2	1–1	1–0	1–3	1–0	1–1	1–0	2–1	2–0	1–1	2–0	—	1–1	2–5	1–1	0–0	2–1	0–0	1–0	2–1
Pontevedra	0–1	1–0	2–0	0–0	1–1	1–0	1–2	2–0	1–1	0–0	1–1	3–1	—	1–0	2–0	3–0	3–1	1–1	0–0	3–0
Rayo Vallecano	3–2	5–0	4–1	0–1	3–1	2–1	0–0	2–0	2–2	3–0	5–0	0–1	1–0	—	1–0	3–1	4–0	1–0	3–1	2–0
RM Castilla	3–1	2–1	2–2	2–1	4–2	1–1	2–1	3–1	1–2	2–2	4–0	2–0	2–2	0–1	—	1–0	0–0	4–0	1–2	1–0
San Isidro	3–2	0–1	3–1	1–4	0–1	2–4	1–2	0–1	2–1	0–1	2–0	2–2	1–2	2–2	0–3	—	0–1	3–1	0–3	1–2
SS Reyes	1–2	2–1	1–1	0–1	1–1	0–3	1–1	1–2	0–2	1–0	0–2	2–0	1–2	0–0	1–0	4–1	—	0–1	1–0	1–2
Universidad LPGC	0–0	4–0	0–2	1–0	4–1	0–1	2–0	3–2	3–0	3–0	1–1	2–1	2–0	0–0	1–0	2–2	2–0	—	1–0	3–1
Vecindario	1–0	4–0	3–0	2–0	2–0	0–2	4–1	1–0	6–0	5–1	2–1	2–0	1–3	1–1	3–2	2–3	2–0	0–1	—	0–3
Villa Sta. Brígida	0–3	1–1	1–2	1–0	2–1	2–0	3–1	0–0	1–1	2–1	1–1	0–1	0–1	0–0	2–2	1–1	0–0	1–1	1–0	—

Source: SoccerWay
Legend: Blue = home team win; Yellow = draw; Red = away team win.

=== Top scorers ===
Last updated 18 May 2008

Pos	Player	Team	Goals
1	(Spain) José Callejón	RM Castilla	21
1	(Serbia) Goran Marić	Celta B	21
3	(Brazil) Igor de Souza	Pontevedra	17
3	(Spain) Borja Rubiato	Atlético B	17
5	(Spain) Sergio Pachón	Rayo Vallecano	16
5	(Spain) Gustavo Souto	Villa Sta. Brígida	16
7	(Spain) Raúl Borrero	Vecindario	15
8	(Spain) Gerardo Berodia	Leganés	12

=== Top goalkeepers ===
Last updated 18 May 2008

Goalkeeper	Goals	Matches	Average	Team
(France) Nicolas Bonis	27	36	0.75	Pontevedra
(Spain) Guillermo Suárez	28	32	0.88	Marino
(Spain) Ramón Sánchez	40	37	1.08	Pájara PJ
(Spain) Manu Taranilla	40	36	1.11	Ourense
(Spain) Sergio Álvarez	35	29	1.21	Celta B
(Spain) Gonzalo López	42	30	1.4	SS Reyes
(Spain) David Sierra	38	27	1.41	Fuenlabrada
(Spain) Javi Muñoz	29	26	1.12	Vecindario
(Spain) Raúl Arribas	24	24	1	Alcorcón
(Spain) Salvador Novoa	26	24	1.08	Fuerteventura
(Spain) Moisés Trujillo	45	24	1.88	San Isidro

== Group 2 ==
- Teams from Aragon, Basque Country, Castile and León, two teams from Castile-La Mancha (CD Guadalajara and UB Conquense), La Rioja and Navarre.

=== Summary before 2007–08 season ===
- Scores and Classification - Group 2
- Liguilla de Ascenso:
  - SD Eibar - Promoted to Segunda División
  - Burgos CF - Eliminated in Second Round
  - CF Palencia - Eliminated in First Round
  - Real Unión - Eliminated in First Round

- Promoted to this group from Tercera División:
  - UB Conquense - Founded in: 1946//, Based in: Cuenca, Castile-La Mancha//, Promoted From: Group 18
  - CD Guadalajara - Founded in: 1947//, Based in: Guadalajara, Castile-La Mancha//, Promoted From: Group 18
  - Peña Sport FC - Founded in: 1925//, Based in: Tafalla, Navarre//, Promoted From: Group 15

- Relegated to this group from Segunda División:
  - SD Ponferradina - Founded in: 1922//, Based in: Ponferrada, Castile and León//, Relegated From: Segunda División

- Relegated to Tercera División:
  - Amurrio Club - Founded in: 1949//, Based in: Amurrio, Basque Country//, Relegated to: Group 4
  - Real Oviedo - Founded in: 1926//, Based in: Oviedo, Asturias//, Relegated to: Group 2
  - Universidad de Oviedo - Founded in: 1962//, Based in: Oviedo, Asturias//, Relegated to: Group 2
  - CD Alfaro - Founded in: 1922//, Based in: Alfaro, La Rioja//, Relegated to: Group 16

=== Teams ===
Location of teams in Segunda División B Gr. 2 2007–08

Group 2
	Team	Founded in	Based in	Ground
1	Real Unión	1915	Irún, Basque Country	Stadium Gal
2	Barakaldo	1917	Barakaldo, Basque Country	Lasesarre
3	Ponferradina	1922	Ponferrada, Castile and León	El Toralín
4	C. Leonesa	1923	León, Castile and León	Reino de León
5	Lemona	1923	Lemoa, Basque Country	Arlonagusia
6	Peña Sport	1925	Tafalla, Navarre	San Francisco
7	Logroñés	1940	Logroño, La Rioja	Las Gaunas
8	Valladolid B	1944	Valladolid, Castile and León	Ciudad Deportiva del Real Valladolid
9	Conquense	1946	Cuenca, Castile-La Mancha	La Fuensanta
10	Guadalajara	1947	Guadalajara, Castile-La Mancha	Pedro Escartín
11	Real Sociedad B	1951	San Sebastián, Basque Country	Zubieta
12	Huesca	1960	Huesca, Aragon	El Alcoraz
13	Osasuna B	1964	Pamplona, Navarre	Tajonar
14	Bilbao Athletic	1964	Bilbao, Basque Country	Lezama
15	Zamora	1969	Zamora, Castile and León	Ruta de la Plata
16	Guijuelo	1974	Guijuelo, Castile and León	Municipal de Guijuelo
17	Palencia	1975	Palencia, Castile and León	Nueva Balastera
18	Burgos	1994	Burgos, Castile and León	El Plantío
19	Sestao	1996	Sestao, Basque Country	Las Llanas
20	Logroñés CF	2000	Logroño, La Rioja	Las Gaunas

=== League table ===
Pos	Team	Pld	W	D	L	GF	GA	GD	Pts	Qualification or relegation
1	Ponferradina (C)	38	18	13	7	52	28	+24	67	Qualification to promotion playoffs
2	Huesca (O)	38	18	13	7	45	27	+18	67	Qualification to promotion playoffs
3	Zamora	38	17	12	9	43	38	+5	63	Qualification to promotion playoffs
4	Barakaldo	38	18	9	11	45	34	+11	63	Qualification to promotion playoffs
5	Real Unión	38	17	11	10	48	34	+14	62	Qualification to Copa del Rey
6	Conquense	38	17	10	11	54	44	+10	61	Qualification to Copa del Rey
7	Lemona	38	17	9	12	42	34	+8	60	Qualification to Copa del Rey
8	Guadalajara	38	17	7	14	45	49	−4	58	
9	Guijuelo	38	16	9	13	42	41	+1	57	
10	Sestao River	38	15	10	13	34	26	+8	55	
11	Cultural Leonesa	38	14	10	14	49	44	+5	52	
12	Real Sociedad B	38	12	14	12	40	38	+2	50	
13	Logroñés	38	11	14	13	40	46	−6	47 (Note: CD Logroñés was relegated to Tercera División for not paying its players.)	
14	Valladolid B	38	11	11	16	37	48	−11	44	
15	Bilbao Athletic	38	11	9	18	40	50	−10	42	
16	Osasuna B	38	9	13	16	25	37	−12	40	Qualification to relegation playoffs
17	Logroñés CF (R)	38	8	16	14	37	40	−3	40	Relegation to Tercera División
18	Burgos (R)	38	9	13	16	30	39	−9	40	Relegation to Tercera División
19	Palencia (R)	38	10	9	19	30	46	−16	39	Relegation to Tercera División
20	Peña Sport (R)	38	5	8	25	31	66	−35	23	Relegation to Tercera División

Rules for classification: 1st points; 2nd head-to-head; 3rd goal difference; 4th goals scored.
(C) Champions; (O) Promoted through playoff; (R) Relegated

=== Results ===
Home \ Away	BAR	BIL	BUR	CON	CUL	GUA	GUI	HUE	LEM	CDL	LCF	OSA	PAL	PEÑ	PON	RSO	RUN	SES	VLL	ZAM
Barakaldo	—	1–2	1–0	1–1	1–1	3–1	3–2	1–0	0–0	3–0	2–1	2–0	2–0	1–0	1–0	0–1	2–1	2–0	1–1	1–3
Bilbao Athletic	0–1	—	2–0	1–2	0–1	1–2	0–0	1–1	2–0	0–1	0–3	0–1	2–2	2–1	0–0	2–2	1–2	0–0	2–2	2–1
Burgos	1–0	2–1	—	0–1	0–1	1–1	0–1	0–0	1–1	0–0	2–2	1–4	0–0	0–1	0–2	0–0	0–0	0–2	1–2	2–1
Conquense	0–0	0–0	1–2	—	1–1	3–1	1–2	1–0	2–1	3–3	2–1	5–0	2–0	3–1	1–1	0–0	3–2	0–1	1–0	0–1
Cultural Leonesa	1–1	2–1	0–2	0–1	—	2–0	3–2	1–3	0–1	3–2	0–0	0–0	3–1	3–0	0–1	3–0	1–2	1–1	2–0	4–0
Guadalajara	3–2	2–3	2–1	1–1	2–1	—	1–0	0–1	3–2	1–3	0–0	0–4	2–0	3–1	0–0	2–2	2–0	1–0	1–0	0–1
Guijuelo	2–0	0–3	0–1	1–1	1–0	0–0	—	1–1	1–0	2–0	1–0	2–0	2–0	2–1	2–0	2–2	0–1	0–1	0–0	0–0
Huesca	2–1	4–2	1–0	4–2	3–1	0–1	3–1	—	0–3	0–0	1–0	1–0	2–1	2–0	0–0	5–1	2–1	2–1	0–0	1–1
Lemona	1–2	0–2	2–2	3–0	1–1	1–0	2–1	1–0	—	2–0	2–1	1–0	0–2	1–1	1–0	1–0	2–0	1–0	2–1	2–1
CD Logroñés	0–1	1–2	0–0	1–0	3–3	0–1	2–1	0–2	1–2	—	1–1	0–0	2–1	1–0	1–1	1–0	3–1	1–0	1–1	0–0
Logroñés CF	0–2	0–1	0–0	1–2	0–1	3–1	0–1	0–0	1–2	0–0	—	0–0	1–1	2–0	1–0	0–2	1–1	0–0	3–1	3–0
Osasuna B	0–0	1–2	1–0	0–1	1–0	0–1	2–0	1–3	1–1	1–3	0–0	—	1–2	0–0	1–1	1–0	0–0	0–3	1–1	0–1
Palencia	1–0	1–0	1–1	2–2	0–0	1–2	0–1	0–0	2–1	1–3	0–0	0–1	—	2–2	0–1	3–2	1–0	1–0	1–0	0–1
Peña Sport	0–2	3–2	2–4	2–3	1–2	0–2	1–1	0–1	1–0	3–3	2–2	1–2	1–0	—	0–2	1–0	0–2	0–2	1–2	1–1
Ponferradina	2–3	5–0	0–1	3–2	4–1	1–2	4–0	0–0	0–0	2–1	3–0	2–1	2–1	2–1	—	0–0	2–1	2–1	2–0	0–0
R. Sociedad B	0–0	1–1	1–1	1–2	3–2	2–0	5–0	0–0	1–0	3–0	2–2	0–0	1–0	1–0	0–1	—	0–2	0–1	2–1	0–0
Real Unión	2–0	1–0	3–1	2–1	2–1	3–0	1–1	0–0	1–1	1–1	3–1	1–0	3–0	1–1	0–0	2–3	—	0–0	1–0	2–0
Sestao River	0–0	1–0	1–0	1–0	0–1	2–2	0–3	0–0	1–0	2–0	1–2	0–0	1–0	3–0	1–2	0–1	1–2	—	1–0	3–0
Valladolid B	2–0	2–0	0–3	1–3	1–1	2–1	0–3	3–0	1–0	1–0	2–4	0–0	0–2	1–0	3–3	0–0	2–1	1–1	—	1–2
Zamora	3–2	1–0	1–0	2–0	2–1	2–1	2–3	1–0	1–1	1–1	1–1	2–0	2–0	3–1	1–1	2–1	0–0	1–1	1–2	—

Source: SoccerWay
Legend: Blue = home team win; Yellow = draw; Red = away team win.

=== Top scorers ===
Last updated 18 May 2008

Pos	Player	Team	Goals
1	(Spain) Roberto	Huesca	20
2	(Spain) Óscar De Paula	Ponferradina	16
3	(Spain) Germán Beltrán	Barakaldo	14
4	(Senegal) Matar Diop	Conquense	12
4	(Spain) Sergio Francisco	Real Unión	12
5	(Spain) Óscar Martín	Sestao River	11
5	(Brazil) Thiago Belmonte	Zamora	11
5	(Spain) Iñaki Goikoetxea	Real Unión	11

=== Top goalkeepers ===
Last updated 18 May 2008

Goalkeeper	Goals	Matches	Average	Team
(Spain) Roberto Pampín	19	35	0.54	Sestao River
(Spain) Eduardo Navarro	22	32	0.69	Huesca
(Spain) Jesús Cabrero	23	31	0.74	Ponferradina
(Spain) Andrés Fernández	25	32	0.78	Osasuna B
(Spain) Xavier Otermin	32	37	0.86	Real Unión
(Spain) José Carlos González	27	30	0.9	Lemona
(Spain) Dani Giménez	34	36	0.94	Zamora
(Spain) Xabier Cardiel	38	37	1.03	Burgos
(Spain) José Bermúdez	32	30	1.07	Cultural Leonesa
(Spain) José Manuel Vilches	31	29	1.07	Logroñés CF
(Spain) Jorge Sanmiguel	40	33	1.21	Guadalajara

== Group 3 ==
- Teams from Valencian Community, Catalonia, and Balearic Islands.

=== Summary before 2007–08 season ===
- Scores and Classification - Group 3
- Liguilla de Ascenso:
  - Alicante CF - Eliminated in Second Round
  - SD Huesca Eliminated in Second Round
  - CD Alcoyano - Eliminated in First Round
  - CE L'Hospitalet - Eliminated in First Round

- Promoted to this group from Tercera División:
  - CD Dénia - Founded in: 1927//, Based in: Dénia, Valencian Community//, Promoted From: Group 6
  - CF Gavà - Founded in: 1922//, Based in: Gavà, Catalonia//, Promoted From: Group 5
  - Girona FC - Founded in: 1929//, Based in: Girona, Catalonia//, Promoted From: Group 5
  - CE Sabadell FC - Founded in: 1903//, Based in: Sabadell, Catalonia//, Promoted From: Group 5
  - SE Eivissa-Ibiza - Founded in: 1995//, Based in: Ibiza Town, Balearic Islands//, Promoted From: Group 11
  - Villarreal B - Founded in: 1999//, Based in: Villarreal/Vila-real, Valencian Community//, Promoted From: Group 6
  - Ontinyent CF - Founded in: 1947//, Based in: Ontinyent, Valencian Community//, Promoted From: Group 6

- Relegated to this group from Segunda División:

- Relegated to Tercera División:
  - UD Barbastro - Founded in: 1934//, Based in: Barbastro, Aragon//, Relegated to: Group 17
  - FC Barcelona Atlètic - Founded in: 1970//, Based in: Barcelona, Catalonia//, Relegated to: Group 5
  - CD Eldense - Founded in: 1921//, Based in: Elda, Valencian Community//, Relegated to: Group 6
  - UE Sant Andreu - Founded in: 1909//, Based in: Barcelona, Catalonia//, Relegated to: Group 5
  - Valencia B - Founded in: 1944//, Based in: Paterna, Valencian Community//, Relegated to: Group 6

- Relegated to Tercera Catalana:
  - UE Figueres - Founded in: 1919//, Based in: Figueres, Catalonia//, Replaced by: MiApuesta Castelldefels

=== Teams ===
Location of teams in Segunda División B Gr. 3 2007–08

Group 3
	Team	Founded in	Based in	Ground
1	Badalona	1903	Badalona, Catalonia	Camp del Centenari
2	Sabadell	1903	Sabadell, Catalonia	Nova Creu Alta
3	Terrassa	1906	Terrassa, Catalonia	Olímpic de Terrassa
4	Alicante	1918	Alicante, Valencian Community	José Rico Pérez
5	MiApuesta Castelldefels	1919	Castelldefels, Catalonia	Els Canyars
6	Gavà	1922	Gavà, Catalonia	La Bòbila
7	Dénia	1927	Dénia, Valencian Community	Camp Nou de Dènia
8	Alcoyano	1929	Alcoi, Valencian Community	El Collao
9	Girona	1930	Girona, Catalonia	Montilivi
10	Lleida	1938	Lleida, Catalonia	Camp d'Esports
11	Levante B	1939	Valencia, Valencian Community	Ciudad Deportiva de Buñol
12	Vila-Joiosa	1944	Villajoyosa/La Vila Joiosa, Valencian Community	Nou Pla
13	Gramenet	1945	Santa Coloma de Gramenet, Catalonia	Nou Municipal
14	Ontinyent	1947	Ontinyent, Valencian Community	El Clariano
15	L'Hospitalet	1957	L'Hospitalet de Llobregat, Catalonia	La Feixa Llarga
16	Benidorm	1964	Benidorm, Valencian Community	Foietes
17	Espanyol B	1981	Sant Adrià de Besòs, Catalonia	Ciutat Deportiva RCD Espanyol
18	Orihuela	1993	Orihuela, Valencian Community	Los Arcos
19	Eivissa	1995	Ibiza Town, Balearic Islands	Can Misses
20	Villarreal B	1999	Villarreal/Vila-real, Valencian Community	Ciudad Deportiva Villarreal CF

=== League table ===
Pos	Team	Pld	W	D	L	GF	GA	GD	Pts	Qualification or relegation
1	Girona (C, O)	38	20	12	6	61	28	+33	72	Qualification to promotion playoffs
2	Alicante (O)	38	16	16	6	52	21	+31	64	Qualification to promotion playoffs
3	Gavà	38	16	15	7	45	33	+12	63	Qualification to promotion playoffs
4	Benidorm	38	16	11	11	43	39	+4	59	Qualification to promotion playoffs
5	Orihuela	38	13	17	8	51	32	+19	56	Qualification to Copa del Rey
6	Ontinyent	38	16	8	14	46	46	0	56	
7	Eivissa	38	12	17	9	43	42	+1	53	
8	Gramenet	38	13	13	12	43	46	−3	52	
9	Alcoyano	38	11	18	9	38	31	+7	51	
10	Badalona	38	11	17	10	38	40	−2	50	
11	Villarreal B	38	13	10	15	37	38	−1	49	
12	Dénia	38	11	15	12	34	36	−2	48	
13	Lleida	38	11	15	12	38	44	−6	48	
14	Sabadell	38	10	18	10	39	47	−8	48	
15	Terrassa	38	11	13	14	44	46	−2	46	
16	Villajoyosa (R)	38	11	12	15	31	37	−6	45	Qualification to relegation playoffs
17	Miapuesta (R)	38	11	11	16	41	54	−13	44	Relegation to Tercera División
18	Espanyol B (R)	38	8	15	15	45	59	−14	39	Relegation to Tercera División
19	L'Hospitalet (R)	38	8	11	19	21	47	−26	35	Relegation to Tercera División
20	Levante B (R)	38	4	12	22	33	57	−24	24	Relegation to Tercera División

Rules for classification: 1st points; 2nd head-to-head; 3rd goal difference; 4th goals scored.
(C) Champions; (O) Promoted through playoff; (R) Relegated

=== Results ===
Home \ Away	ALC	ALI	BAD	BEN	DEN	ESP	GAV	GIR	GRA	IBI	LEV	LHO	LLE	MIA	ONT	ORI	SAB	TER	VIJ	VIR
Alcoyano	—	1–1	1–0	0–1	1–1	3–0	0–0	3–1	1–1	0–0	1–1	2–1	0–0	3–0	0–1	1–1	2–0	0–0	1–0	0–0
Alicante	1–1	—	1–1	3–0	2–2	3–0	2–1	0–2	1–1	0–1	0–0	5–0	2–0	2–0	2–0	0–1	5–0	4–0	2–0	0–1
Badalona	0–0	0–0	—	0–0	2–1	1–4	2–4	2–2	2–1	0–0	0–0	1–0	1–1	2–2	2–1	1–1	2–1	1–0	0–1	0–0
Benidorm	0–0	0–0	1–3	—	3–1	1–0	1–0	1–1	2–1	3–0	1–0	0–0	1–0	5–1	2–2	2–1	0–0	2–1	0–1	2–0
Dénia	2–1	0–0	0–0	3–0	—	2–0	0–0	1–3	0–0	0–1	1–0	1–1	1–0	0–2	0–1	1–1	3–0	1–1	0–1	1–0
Espanyol B	0–1	1–1	2–0	1–1	2–2	—	1–1	0–2	1–1	1–1	2–2	3–1	3–1	3–2	2–0	2–2	1–1	1–1	0–0	1–1
Gavà	0–0	1–1	1–1	1–0	1–1	2–1	—	0–0	0–2	2–0	2–0	1–0	2–2	3–0	1–0	1–0	3–0	2–0	2–0	1–0
Girona	2–0	0–1	2–0	4–1	4–0	4–2	0–0	—	2–0	1–1	3–0	1–0	3–0	1–1	3–1	0–3	0–2	3–1	2–1	0–1
Gramenet	2–1	0–0	3–2	2–0	2–0	3–2	2–1	1–1	—	0–2	1–0	2–2	1–2	2–1	1–3	2–2	0–2	0–0	1–0	1–3
Ibiza-Eivissa	2–2	0–1	1–0	1–1	1–0	1–1	4–0	1–0	2–2	—	2–1	3–0	0–0	3–0	1–2	0–0	1–1	1–1	4–0	0–2
Levante B	1–2	0–2	2–3	1–2	1–2	3–0	2–3	1–2	0–0	3–1	—	1–1	1–1	1–1	0–1	1–4	1–2	1–3	0–0	1–3
L'Hospitalet	3–1	0–0	0–2	1–1	0–0	1–0	1–2	0–2	0–1	0–0	1–0	—	1–2	0–2	1–0	0–1	0–0	0–4	0–2	1–0
Lleida	3–2	1–0	1–0	1–1	1–0	1–2	1–1	0–1	2–1	3–3	0–2	1–1	—	1–0	2–2	0–1	1–1	0–0	2–1	0–1
Miapuesta	0–3	0–1	1–1	0–1	1–2	1–0	2–2	1–1	2–0	1–1	3–0	0–2	1–1	—	3–2	0–0	2–0	2–1	3–2	3–2
Ontinyent	1–1	1–0	2–1	2–1	1–1	1–2	1–0	0–0	1–2	1–2	2–2	1–0	0–0	2–0	—	2–0	1–3	0–0	2–1	2–1
Orihuela	1–0	1–1	0–1	3–1	0–1	2–2	1–1	0–0	1–1	6–0	3–2	0–1	0–2	2–0	4–0	—	1–1	2–1	3–0	2–2
Sabadell	0–0	1–1	0–1	2–0	1–0	2–1	1–1	0–5	2–2	1–4	0–0	3–0	1–1	0–0	3–2	1–1	—	1–1	0–1	1–1
Terrassa	1–2	1–1	1–1	0–2	1–1	2–0	2–3	1–1	1–0	3–1	2–1	0–0	1–2	1–0	0–2	1–0	2–4	—	2–0	4–1
Villajoyosa	1–1	2–3	1–1	2–1	0–0	4–0	1–0	1–1	0–1	0–0	0–0	2–0	3–1	1–1	0–2	0–0	0–0	2–0	—	0–0
Villarreal B	2–0	0–3	1–1	0–2	0–1	1–1	0–0	0–1	2–0	3–0	0–1	0–1	2–1	0–2	2–1	0–0	3–1	1–3	1–0	—

Source: SoccerWay
Legend: Blue = home team win; Yellow = draw; Red = away team win.

=== Top scorers ===
Last updated 18 May 2008

Pos	Player	Team	Goals
1	(Spain) Kiko Ratón	Orihuela	21
2	(Spain) Miki Albert	Girona	20
3	(Spain) David Prats	Badalona	15
3	(Spain) José Manuel Meca	Gramenet	15
5	(Uruguay) Matías Alonso	Eivissa	14
5	(Spain) Joel Álvarez	Gavà	14
7	(France) Gregory Laget	Dénia	13
7	(Spain) Álvaro del Moral	Benidorm	13

=== Top goalkeepers ===
Last updated 18 May 2008

Goalkeeper	Goals	Matches	Average	Team
(Spain) Jesús Unanua	19	35	0.54	Alicante
(Venezuela) Rafael Ponzo	26	36	0.72	Girona
(Spain) Fernando Maestro	29	37	0.78	Alcoyano
(Spain) Óscar Fornés	26	31	0.84	Villajoyosa
(Spain) Gonzalo Eraso	31	36	0.86	Gavà
(Spain) Paco Fernández	32	35	0.91	Dénia
(Spain) Juan Carlos	34	35	0.97	Villarreal B
(Spain) Rubén Martínez	30	30	1	Badalona
(Spain) Emilio Muñoz	35	32	1.09	Benidorm
(Spain) Miguel Morales	38	34	1.12	Terrassa
(Spain) David de Navas	41	36	1.14	Sabadell

== Group 4 ==
- Teams from Andalusia, Extremadura, the other two teams from Castile La Mancha (Talavera CF and UD Puertollano), Ceuta, Melilla and Murcia.

=== Summary before 2007–08 season ===
- Scores and Classification - Group 4
- Liguilla de Ascenso:
  - Sevilla Atlético - Promoted to Segunda División
  - CD Linares - Eliminated in First Round
  - Racing Club Portuense - Eliminated in First Round
  - Córdoba CF - Promoted to Segunda División

- Promoted to this group from Tercera División:
  - Mazarrón CF - Founded in: 1928//, Based in: Mazarrón, Region of Murcia//, Promoted From: Group 13
  - Lucena CF - Founded in: 1968//, Based in: Lucena, Andalusia//, Promoted From: Group 10
  - Real Betis B - Founded in: 1962//, Based in: Seville, Andalusia//, Promoted From: Group 10
  - Algeciras CF - Founded in: 1912//, Based in: Algeciras, Andalusia//, Promoted From: Group 10

- Relegated to this group from Segunda División:
  - Lorca Deportiva CF - Founded in: 2002//, Based in: Lorca, Región de Murcia//, Relegated From: Segunda División

- Relegated to Tercera División:
  - Málaga B - Founded in: 1990//, Based in: Málaga, Andalusia//, Relegated to: Group 9
  - Villanovense - Founded in: 1992//, Based in: Villanueva de la Serena, Extremadura//, Relegated to: Group 14
  - Villanueva - Founded in: 1951//, Based in: Villanueva de Córdoba, Andalusia//, Relegated to: Group 10
  - Cerro Reyes - Founded in: 1979//, Based in: Badajoz, Extremadura//, Relegated to: Group 14
  - Extremadura - Founded in: 1924//, Based in: Almendralejo, Extremadura//, Relegated to: Group 14

=== Teams ===
Location of teams in Segunda División B Gr. 4 2007–08

Group 4
	Team	Founded in	Based in	Ground
1	Algeciras	1912	Algeciras, Andalusia	Nuevo Mirador
2	Real Jaén	1922	Jaén, Andalusia	Nuevo La Victoria
3	Águilas	1925	Águilas, Region of Murcia	El Rubial
4	Portuense	1928	El Puerto de Santa María, Andalusia	José del Cuvillo
5	Mazarrón	1928	Mazarrón, Region of Murcia	Municipal de Mazarrón
6	Granada	1931	Granada, Andalusia	Nuevo Los Cármenes
7	Alcalá	1944	Alcala de Guadaira, Andalusia	Nuevo Ciudad de Alcalá
8	Talavera	1948	Talavera de la Reina, Castile-La Mancha	El Prado
9	Puertollano	1948	Puertollano, Castile-La Mancha	Francisco Sánchez Menor
10	Betis B	1962	Seville, Andalusia	Ciudad Deportiva Ruíz de Lopera
11	Écija	1968	Ecija, Andalusia	San Pablo
12	Lucena	1968	Lucena, Andalusia	Ciudad Deportiva Lucena
13	Baza	1970	Baza, Andalusia	Constantino Navarro
14	Melilla	1976	Melilla	Álvarez Claro
15	Mérida	1990	Mérida, Extremadura	Romano
16	Linares	1990	Linares, Andalusia	Linarejos
17	Cartagena	1995	Cartagena, Region of Murcia	Cartagonova
18	Ceuta	1996	Ceuta	Alfonso Murube
19	Marbella	1997	Marbella, Andalusia	Municipal de Marbella
20	Lorca	2002	Lorca, Region of Murcia	Francisco Artés Carrasco

=== League table ===
Pos	Team	Pld	W	D	L	GF	GA	GD	Pts	Qualification or relegation
1	Écija (C)	38	21	9	8	54	29	+25	72	Qualification to promotion playoffs
2	Linares	38	20	7	11	61	43	+18	67	Qualification to promotion playoffs
3	Ceuta	38	18	12	8	48	30	+18	66	Qualification to promotion playoffs
4	Mérida	38	19	7	12	59	47	+12	64	Qualification to promotion playoffs
5	Granada	38	16	15	7	52	36	+16	63	Qualification to Copa del Rey
6	Águilas	38	16	10	12	50	38	+12	58	Qualification to Copa del Rey
7	Melilla	38	15	13	10	47	36	+11	58	Qualification to Copa del Rey
8	Cartagena	38	15	12	11	42	33	+9	57	
9	Real Jaén	38	16	8	14	30	28	+2	56	
10	Lucena	38	13	13	12	40	34	+6	52	
11	Lorca	38	13	10	15	38	40	−2	49	
12	Real Betis B	38	14	7	17	39	42	−3	49	
13	Puertollano	38	12	11	15	36	42	−6	47	
14	Portuense	38	11	13	14	34	46	−12	46	
15	Marbella	38	12	10	16	29	42	−13	46	
16	Baza (R)	38	9	16	13	36	44	−8	43	Qualification to relegation playoffs
17	Mazarrón (R)	38	11	9	18	37	55	−18	42	Relegation to Tercera División
18	Alcalá (R)	38	10	11	17	32	43	−11	41	Relegation to Tercera División
19	Talavera (R)	38	8	11	19	37	62	−25	35	Relegation to Tercera División
20	Algeciras (R)	38	4	10	24	31	62	−31	22 (Note: Algeciras was relegated to Primera División de Andalucía for not paying its players.)	Relegation to Tercera División

Rules for classification: 1st points; 2nd head-to-head; 3rd goal difference; 4th goals scored.
(C) Champions; (R) Relegated

=== Results ===
Home \ Away	AGU	ALC	ALG	BAZ	BET	CAR	CEU	ECI	GRA	JAE	LIN	LOR	LUC	MAR	MAZ	MEL	MER	POR	PUE	TAL
Águilas	—	1–0	2–1	1–1	2–0	1–3	2–0	1–3	1–1	1–2	1–0	1–0	2–0	0–0	5–3	2–0	0–1	0–1	2–2	3–1
Alcalá	2–1	—	2–0	0–1	1–2	0–0	0–0	1–1	0–1	1–0	1–3	2–4	1–2	2–0	1–1	1–0	0–1	0–2	1–0	1–2
Algeciras	0–2	2–2	—	3–0	1–1	0–2	0–3	0–1	0–1	1–0	1–1	1–0	0–0	2–2	1–2	2–3	0–2	1–2	0–1	2–2
Baza	0–1	2–1	2–0	—	2–1	0–0	1–1	0–1	3–3	1–0	1–2	3–1	0–0	0–0	0–0	1–4	2–4	0–0	0–1	1–0
Betis B	0–1	3–1	0–2	0–0	—	0–1	2–0	0–0	2–2	1–0	0–4	0–1	0–0	2–0	3–0	3–0	0–1	4–0	2–1	0–1
Cartagena	2–1	0–0	3–0	1–1	1–2	—	0–0	0–2	1–1	2–0	3–1	3–1	2–1	0–1	2–0	1–2	3–3	1–0	0–0	2–3
Ceuta	2–1	1–0	1–1	1–0	0–1	0–2	—	2–0	2–2	1–0	2–1	0–2	1–0	0–0	3–0	1–1	4–3	4–1	3–0	1–0
Écija	0–2	4–0	1–1	2–1	1–0	2–0	0–1	—	1–0	1–1	3–0	1–0	1–1	1–0	1–1	1–0	2–1	2–1	2–0	4–0
Granada	0–0	2–2	1–0	1–1	0–0	0–0	1–0	1–1	—	1–0	3–1	1–0	1–2	2–1	1–0	0–0	4–2	4–1	0–2	6–2
Real Jaén	2–2	0–1	1–0	0–1	1–0	2–0	0–0	1–1	1–2	—	2–1	1–0	1–0	1–1	1–0	2–0	0–2	2–0	0–0	1–0
Linares	4–2	1–1	3–1	2–2	2–0	1–3	1–0	2–1	0–1	0–1	—	3–0	3–0	3–1	2–1	0–0	3–0	0–2	2–1	4–1
Lorca	0–0	0–0	2–1	2–2	2–1	1–0	0–3	2–1	1–2	2–0	0–1	—	1–2	1–0	0–0	2–3	0–0	1–0	3–1	1–1
Lucena	2–1	0–2	3–1	1–0	5–0	0–0	1–1	0–2	1–0	0–0	0–2	1–1	—	2–4	1–1	2–0	3–0	2–0	0–1	2–0
Marbella	0–0	1–0	3–1	2–1	2–1	0–1	0–0	1–1	0–2	1–0	1–2	0–3	0–0	—	3–2	0–2	1–0	1–0	1–3	0–0
Mazarrón	0–3	0–0	4–2	0–1	2–1	2–0	1–3	2–1	1–0	0–1	0–0	2–1	1–0	2–0	—	0–3	0–3	1–1	1–3	3–0
Melilla	2–1	2–1	1–1	2–0	2–1	0–0	1–1	1–2	1–0	1–2	1–1	1–1	3–2	0–1	0–0	—	6–0	1–1	1–0	0–0
Mérida	1–0	0–1	0–0	2–1	1–2	3–0	0–1	4–2	2–1	2–0	4–0	0–0	1–1	0–1	4–2	2–1	—	3–0	2–1	2–2
Portuense	0–0	1–0	2–1	1–1	1–1	0–0	2–0	0–2	2–2	1–1	1–2	2–1	0–2	1–0	3–0	0–0	1–1	—	1–1	2–0
Puertollano	1–1	0–0	1–0	2–2	0–1	0–2	1–1	1–0	2–2	0–1	1–1	0–1	0–0	2–0	0–1	1–3	2–1	3–0	—	1–0
Talavera	1–4	2–3	3–1	1–1	1–2	2–1	2–4	0–2	0–0	0–2	0–2	0–0	1–1	2–0	2–1	0–0	0–1	1–1	4–0	—

Source: SoccerWay
Legend: Blue = home team win; Yellow = draw; Red = away team win.

=== Top scorers ===
Last updated 18 May 2008

Pos	Player	Team	Goals
1	(Argentina) Luciano Becchio	Mérida	22
2	(Spain) Gorka Pintado	Granada	18
3	(Spain) Juan Belencoso	Baza	16
4	(Spain) Fran Amado	Ceuta	15
4	(Spain) Pepe Díaz	Écija	15
6	(Spain) Chando	Lorca	13
7	(Spain) Roberto Cuevas	Mérida	13
8	(Spain) Óscar Martínez	Linares	12

Goalkeeper	Goals	Matches	Average	Team
(Spain) Noé Calleja	28	38	0.74	Real Jaén
(Spain) Zigor	26	35	0.74	Écija
(Spain) Javier Lledó	28	36	0.78	Ceuta
(Spain) Toni García	32	36	0.89	Lucena
(Spain) Xabier Jauregui	31	33	0.94	Lorca
(Spain) Pedro Dorronsoro	35	37	0.95	Melilla
(Spain) Félix Campo	36	38	0.95	Granada
(Spain) Iván Gómez	35	35	1	Águilas
(Spain) Fernando Thorices	39	36	1.08	Alcalá
(Spain) José Vicente Rojas	34	31	1.1	Puertollano
(Spain) Alejandro Ávila	42	38	1.11	Marbella
