= Albert Serra (footballer) =

Spanish footballer

Personal information
- Full name: Albert Serra Figueras
- Date of birth: 6 October 1978 (age 48)
- Place of birth: Banyoles, Spain
- Height: 1.87 m (6 ft 1 1/2 in)
- Position: Centre-back

Senior career*
Years	Team	Apps	(Gls)
1996–2000	Banyoles	139	(9)
2000–2005	Figueres	130	(3)
2005–2009	Girona	115	(7)
2009–2010	Levante	14	(0)
2010–2011	Girona	29	(2)
2011–2014	Olot	89	(4)
Total		516	(25)
- * Club domestic league appearances and goals

Albert Serra Figueras (born 6 October 1978) is a Spanish former footballer who played as a central defender.

== Club career ==
Born in Banyoles, Girona, Catalonia, Serra started his professional career at local UE Figueres in 2000, quickly becoming a regular for the Segunda División B team. After five seasons, he signed with neighbouring Girona FC in the Tercera División.

Girona promoted in 2007, and climbed yet another division the next year, with Serra playing 33 matches. He remained first-choice the following campaign in the Segunda División, but the club's president decided not to renew the player's contract, and he eventually moved to another side in that tier, Levante UD.

After one single season, where he featured in less than half of the matches as the Valencians returned to La Liga, the 32-year-old Serra rejoined Girona. In 2011 he signed for UE Olot also in his native region, retiring three years later.
