= Roberto Pampín =

Association football player

Personal information
- Full name: Roberto Pampín López
- Date of birth: 5 January 1984 (age 42)
- Place of birth: Barakaldo, Spain
- Height: 1.80 m (5 ft 11 in)
- Position: Goalkeeper

Youth career
- 1995–1996: Padura
- 1996–2002: Athletic Bilbao

Senior career*
| Years | Team | Apps | (Gls) |
| 2002–2003 | Basconia | 35 | (0) |
| 2003–2005 | Athletic Bilbao B | 33 | (0) |
| 2004–2005 | Athletic Bilbao | 2 | (0) |
| 2005–2006 | Real Unión | 5 | (0) |
| 2006–2008 | Sestao | 69 | (0) |
| 2008–2009 | SD Eibar | 4 | (0) |
| Total | | 148 | (0) |
- * Club domestic league appearances and goals

Roberto Pampín López (born 5 January 1984), sometimes known simply as Pampín, is a Spanish former professional footballer who played as a goalkeeper. He made two appearances for Athletic Bilbao in La Liga, having come up through their academy system, but spent most of his career in lower divisions with Real Unión, Sestao and SD Eibar.

== Playing career ==
=== Athletic Bilbao ===
Roberto Pampín was born in Barakaldo on the outskirts of Bilbao, and joined the youth academy at Athletic Bilbao at the age of 12. He moved steadily through the ranks before joining Basconia, which is essentially Athletic's C team, in the summer of 2002. He made 35 appearances in the 2002–03 Tercera División as Basconia won their group.

His performances earned him a promotion to Athletic Bilbao B in January 2003. He made three appearances in the rest of that season's Segunda División B campaign, while still completing his Basconia duties, before joining the B team full time for the 2003–04 season. Behind both Miguel Escalona and Oinatz Aulestia in the pecking order, he played only once that season, but by the following season he was first choice, making 29 appearances.

An injury to Iñaki Lafuente saw Pampín on the bench for Bilbao's first team for the Basque derby match against Real Sociedad at the Anoeta Stadium on 21 November 2004, acting as backup to Dani Aranzubia. Just after the hour mark, with Athletic leading 2–1, Aranzubia was shown a red card for a foul on Nihat Kahveci. Pampín was thrust into the limelight, being brought on in place of goalscorer Santi Ezquerro. Things quickly went from bad to worse: by the time Pampín had been on the pitch for ten minutes, he had conceded two goals (to Kahveci and Igor Gabilondo) and Bilbao had transformed a promising 2–1 lead into a humiliating 3–2 defeat.

With Aranzubia suspended for the next match, at home at the San Mamés Stadium against Racing Santander, Pampín stepped up to make his full debut, getting the nod ahead of Aulestia. His performance was much improved, keeping a clean sheet on the way to a 3–0 win for Athletic. When Aranzubia returned from his suspension, however, Pampín went back to the B team for the rest of the season, and left Athletic Bilbao altogether at the end of the season.

=== Later career ===
Pampín transferred to Real Unión of Segunda División B in 2005, but could only make seven appearances during his first season at Stadium Gal. Seeking more regular first team football, he moved again in 2006, this time joining fellow Segunda División B side Sestao. He rapidly established himself as their first choice goalkeeper, making 70 appearances in two seasons with the club.

His form at Sestao allowed him to step up a division, joining SD Eibar in the Segunda División in 2008. He had to wait until the following March to make his debut, which occurred at the Ipurua Municipal Stadium against Salamanca. Eibar were defeated, with the visitors taking a 2–1 win. This set the tone for Pampín's Eibar career: he appeared three more times that season, but ended with a record of three defeats and one draw, having conceded five goals.

By this time, Pampín was suffering from a recurring back injury. This eventually forced his retirement from professional football at the end of the season, aged just 25.

== Coaching career ==
In 2018, Pampín returned to the Athletic Bilbao youth academy, this time as a coach. He became coach of the girls' "Cadete" (intermediate) side, which feeds eventually into the highly successful women's team.

== Club statistics ==
As of 20 November 2020

| Club | Season | League | | | Cup | | Total | |
| Club | Season | Division | Apps | Goals | Apps | Goals | Apps | Goals |
|---|---|---|---|---|---|---|---|---|
| Basconia | 2002–03 | Tercera División | 35 | 0 | – | – | 35 | 0 |
| Athletic Bilbao B | 2002–03 | Segunda División B | 3 | 0 | – | – | 3 | 0 |
| Athletic Bilbao B | 2003–04 | Segunda División B | 1 | 0 | – | – | 1 | 0 |
| Athletic Bilbao B | 2004–05 | Segunda División B | 29 | 0 | – | – | 29 | 0 |
| Athletic Bilbao B | Total | | 33 | 0 | 0 | 0 | 33 | 0 |
| Athletic Bilbao | 2004–05 | La Liga | 2 | 0 | 0 | 0 | 2 | 0 |
| Real Unión | 2005–06 | Segunda División B | 5 | 0 | 2 | 0 | 7 | 0 |
| Sestao | 2006–07 | Segunda División B | 34 | 0 | 1 | 0 | 35 | 0 |
| Sestao | 2007–08 | Segunda División B | 35 | 0 | 0 | 0 | 35 | 0 |
| Sestao | Total | | 69 | 0 | 1 | 0 | 70 | 0 |
| SD Eibar | 2008–09 | Segunda División | 4 | 0 | 0 | 0 | 4 | 0 |
| Career total | | | 148 | 0 | 3 | 0 | 151 | 0 |

== Honours ==
Basconia

- Tercera División: 2002–03
