= José Bermúdez =

Spanish footballer (born 1979)

Personal information
- Full name: José Miguel Bermúdez Ríos
- Date of birth: 9 January 1979 (age 47)
- Place of birth: Málaga, Spain
- Height: 1.93 m (6 ft 4 in)
- Position: Goalkeeper

Team information
- Current team: Khimki (goalkeeping coach)

Youth career
- Puerto Malagueño
- 1996–1997: Barcelona

Senior career*
Years	Team	Apps	(Gls)
1997–2000	Barcelona C	37	(0)
1999–2004	Barcelona B	1	(0)
2000–2001	→ Mataró (loan)	32	(0)
2001–2002	→ Benidorm (loan)	25	(0)
2002–2003	→ Mataró (loan)	37	(0)
2003–2004	→ Burgos (loan)	36	(0)
2004–2005	Figueres	24	(0)
2005–2006	Logroñés	33	(0)
2006–2007	Águilas	33	(0)
2007–2009	Cultural Leonesa	66	(0)
2009–2010	Toledo	32	(0)
2010–2011	Conquense	8	(0)
2011	Guijuelo	3	(0)
2011–2014	Cornellà	74	(0)

Managerial career
- 2015–2017: Santfeliuenc (GK coach)
- 2017–2021: Barcelona (U19 GK coach)
- 2021–2022: Barcelona (U18 GK coach)
- 2022–2023: Barcelona (U19 GK coach)
- 2023–2024: Andorra (GK coach)
- 2024–: Khimki (GK coach)
- * Club domestic league appearances and goals

José Miguel Bermúdez Ríos (born 9 January 1979), sometimes known simply as José, is a Spanish football coach and a former goalkeeper, he is the goalkeeping coach of Russian club Khimki.
