= Toni García (footballer, born 1976) =

Spanish footballer

Personal information
- Full name: José Antonio García Aparicio
- Date of birth: 24 January 1976 (age 50)
- Place of birth: Córdoba, Spain
- Height: 1.86 m (6 ft 1 in)
- Position: Goalkeeper

Youth career
- Real Madrid

Senior career*
Years	Team	Apps	(Gls)
1996–1999	Real Madrid C		
1997–1998	→ Sevilla B (loan)	8	(0)
1999–2001	Torredonjimeno		
2001–2003	Moralo		
2003–2006	Extremadura	90	(0)
2006–2007	Talavera	29	(0)
2007–2011	Lucena	105	(0)
2011–2015	Jaén	104	(0)
2015–2016	Martos	28	(0)

Managerial career
- 2016–2017: Martos B
- 2017–2018: Martos
- * Club domestic league appearances and goals

José Antonio 'Toni' García Aparicio (born 24 January 1976) is a Spanish former footballer who played as a goalkeeper, and is a current manager.

== Club career ==
Born in Córdoba, Andalusia, García was a youth graduate at Real Madrid, making his senior debuts with the C-team in the 1996–97 season. He played mostly in Segunda División B but also in Tercera División in his early years as a senior, representing Torredonjimeno CF, Moralo CP, CF Extremadura, Talavera CF and Lucena CF.

In July 2011, García signed with Real Jaén also in the third level. He was an undisputed starter during his spell, notably playing 37 games in his second season – plus six in the playoffs – as the club returned to Segunda División after an 11-year absence.

On 18 August 2013, aged already 37, García appeared in his first professional match, a 1–2 home defeat against SD Eibar.
