= UE Vilajuïga =

Vilajuïga
- logo
- Full name: Unió Esportiva Vilajuïga, S.A.D.
- Founded: 2007
- Dissolved: 2009
- Ground: Estadi Municipal, Vilajuïga, Catalonia, Spain
- Capacity: 2,500
- 2008–09: 3ª - Group 5, 19th
Home colours	Away colours

Unió Esportiva Vilajuïga, S.A.D. was a Spanish football team based in Vilajuïga, Province of Girona, in the autonomous community of Catalonia. Founded in 2007 it played its last season in 3ª - Group 5, holding home matches at Estadi Municipal de Vilajuïga, with a capacity of 2,500 spectators.

== History ==
UE Vilajuïga was founded in 1919 as UE Figueres. On 27 June 2007 the club's main shareholder transferred the team to Castelldefels and renamed it UE Miapuesta Castelldefels, with the historical UE Castelldefels now serving as the reserve team.

In 2007–08 the club played its first season in the third division, being relegated immediately. It was then moved to Vilajuïga, renamed Unió Esportiva Vilajuïga and started competing in the fourth level, being dissolved after only one year.

=== Club background ===
- Unió Esportiva Miapuesta Castelldefels – (2007–08)
- Unió Esportiva Vilajuïga – (2008–09)

== Season to season ==
- Miapuesta Castelldefels

Season	Tier	Division	Place	Copa del Rey
2007–08	3	2ª B	17th	

- UE Vilajuiga

Season	Tier	Division	Place	Copa del Rey
2008–09	4	3ª	19th	

- 1 season in Segunda División B
- 1 season in Tercera División
Figueres uniform

Miapuesta Castelldefels logo

Miapuesta Castelldefels uniform

== Famous players ==
- (Argentina) Martín Posse
- (Spain) Jordi Masip
- (Spain) Víctor Rodríguez
- (Morocco) Zou Feddal
