= Iván Crespo =

Spanish footballer (born 1984)

Personal information
- Full name: Iván Crespo Secunza
- Date of birth: 10 December 1984 (age 41)
- Place of birth: Santander, Spain
- Height: 1.88 m (6 ft 2 in)
- Position: Goalkeeper

Youth career
- Tropezón

Senior career*
Years	Team	Apps	(Gls)
2003–2005	Tropezón		
2005–2006	Murcia B		
2006–2007	Águilas	4	(0)
2007–2008	Lorca Deportiva	0	(0)
2008	Lucena	2	(0)
2008–2009	Tropezón	35	(0)
2009–2012	Gimnástica	110	(0)
2012–2013	Mirandés	0	(0)
2013–2014	Alavés	30	(0)
2014–2015	Murcia	18	(0)
2015–2016	Lleida Esportiu	36	(0)
2016–2021	Racing Santander	128	(0)
2021–2022	Algeciras	24	(0)
2022–2023	Sestao River	21	(0)
2024–2025	Gimnástica de Torrelavega	29	(0)
- * Club domestic league appearances and goals

Iván Crespo Secunza (born 10 December 1984) is a Spanish former footballer who played as a goalkeeper.

He played 12 Segunda División matches for Alavés, but spent most of his career in Segunda División B, making over 300 appearances in service of seven clubs.

== Club career ==
Born in Santander, Cantabria, Crespo made his senior debut with local Racing de Santander's C-team CD Tropezón. He played mostly in the Segunda División B but also in the Tercera División in his early years as a senior, representing Real Murcia Imperial, Águilas CF, Lorca Deportiva CF, Lucena CF and Gimnástica de Torrelavega.

On 5 July 2012, Crespo signed with CD Mirandés, recently promoted to the Segunda División. On 11 September he appeared in his first professional match, a 2–0 home win against Recreativo de Huelva for that season's Copa del Rey.

On 2 January 2013, Crespo joined third division club Deportivo Alavés. He finished his debut campaign with 20 appearances (playoffs included) as the Basque side returned to division two after four years, playing 12 matches in his second where he acted mainly as a backup to new signing Iñaki Goitia.

On 29 August 2014, Crespo moved to Real Murcia also in the third tier. On 17 June of the following year, he joined Lleida Esportiu of the same league, conceding 20 goals in his only season with the Catalans – best in the group.

Crespo returned to Racing on a two-year deal on 8 August 2016, and repeated his previous year's feat as the team qualified for the play-offs.
