= Lucena CF =

Spanish football club

Lucena
- Full name: Lucena Club de Fútbol, S.A.D.
- Founded: 1968
- Dissolved: 2015
- Ground: Ciudad Deportiva, Lucena, Andalusia, Spain
- Capacity: 5,046
- 2015–16: 3ª – Group 10, 21st (withdrew and relegated)
Home colours	Away colours

Lucena Club de Fútbol, S.A.D. was a Spanish football team based in Lucena, Córdoba, in the autonomous community of Andalusia. Founded in 1968, it was dissolved in 2015.

== History ==
Lucena Club de Fútbol was founded in 1968. It was originally named Atlético Lucentino Industrial Club de Fútbol, receiving its current name in 2006.

In little more than a year of management by Eduardo Bouzón and Javier Martí, who admitted the friendship with the president of Córdoba, Carlos González, Lucena CF fell dramatically without demonstrating its economic, sports and planning abilities.

On 29 December 2015, the club resigned to continue playing in the 2015–16 edition of the Tercera División championship. The poor economic management forced the coaching staff and the president to leave the club. The club did not issue any statement and simply sent its withdrawal documents to the Andalusian Federation.

=== Club names ===
- Atlético Lucentino Industrial - (1968–2006)
- Lucena Club de Fútbol - (2006–2015)

== Season to season ==
- As Atlético Lucentino Industrial

Season	Tier	Division	Place	Copa del Rey
1969–70	5	2ª Reg.		
1970–71	4	1ª Reg.	7th	
1971–72	5	2ª Reg.	20th	
1972–73	5	2ª Reg.	1st	
1973–74	4	1ª Reg.	9th	
1974–75	4	1ª Reg.	10th	
1975–76	4	Reg. Pref.	20th	
1976–77	5	1ª Reg.	3rd	
1977–78	5	Reg. Pref.	5th	
1978–79	5	Reg. Pref.	9th	
1979–80	5	Reg. Pref.	11th	
1980–81	5	Reg. Pref.	12th	
1981–82	5	Reg. Pref.	17th	
1982–83	5	Reg. Pref.	7th	
1983–84	4	3ª	19th	
1984–85	5	Reg. Pref.	18th	
1985–86	6	1ª Reg.	2nd	
1986–87	5	Reg. Pref.	5th	
1987–88	5	Reg. Pref.	11th	

Season	Tier	Division	Place	Copa del Rey
1988–89	5	Reg. Pref.	5th	
1989–90	5	Reg. Pref.	1st	
1990–91	4	3ª	14th	
1991–92	4	3ª	14th	
1992–93	4	3ª	9th	
1993–94	4	3ª	16th	
1994–95	4	3ª	18th	
1995–96	5	Reg. Pref.	1st	
1996–97	4	3ª	17th	
1997–98	4	3ª	5th	
1998–99	4	3ª	5th	
1999–2000	4	3ª	9th	
2000–01	4	3ª	3rd	
2001–02	4	3ª	5th	Preliminary
2002–03	4	3ª	3rd	
2003–04	4	3ª	11th	
2004–05	4	3ª	9th	
2005–06	4	3ª	9th	

- As Lucena Club de Fútbol

Season	Tier	Division	Place	Copa del Rey
2006–07	4	3ª	3rd	
2007–08	3	2ª B	10th	
2008–09	3	2ª B	15th	
2009–10	3	2ª B	6th	
2010–11	3	2ª B	10th	Third round
2011–12	3	2ª B	3rd	
2012–13	3	2ª B	4th	
2013–14	3	2ª B	5th	Second round
2014–15	3	2ª B	20th	
2015–16	4	3ª	(R)	

- 8 seasons in Segunda División B
- 18 seasons in Tercera División
