= Écija Balompié =

- Full name: Écija Balompié, S.A.D.
- Founded: 1939; 1968 (refounded)
- Ground: San Pablo, Écija, Andalusia, Spain
- Capacity: 6,000
- Head coach: Juan Carlos Gómez
- League: Segunda Andaluza Sevilla – Group 1
- 2024–25: Segunda Andaluza Sevilla – Group 1, 4th of 16
Home colours	Away colours

Écija Balompié, S.A.D. is a Spanish football team based in Écija, in the autonomous community of Andalusia. Founded in 1939, it plays in Segunda Andaluza Sevilla – Group 1.

== History ==
In 2007–08 season, the club became champion of the Segunda División B, Group 4. The next season was quite unsuccessful, as the club finished 14th, five points away from being relegated to Tercera. In August 2019, with a debt of €217,000 unpaid, Écija were expelled from the 2019–20 Tercera División.

== Season to season ==
Season	Tier	Division	Place	Copa del Rey
1939–40	5	1ª Reg. B	1st	
1940–41	4	1ª Reg.	2nd	
1941–42	3	1ª Reg.	2nd	
1942–43	3	1ª Reg.	11th	
1943–1969	DNP			
1969–70	4	1ª Reg.	5th	
1970–71	4	1ª Reg.	19th	
1971–72	4	1ª Reg.	7th	
1972–73	4	1ª Reg.	3rd	
1973–74	4	1ª Reg.	16th	
1974–75	4	1ª Reg.	18th	
1975–76	5	1ª Reg.	8th	
1976–77	5	1ª Reg.	5th	
1977–78	6	1ª Reg.	3rd	
1978–79	6	1ª Reg.	8th	
1979–80	6	1ª Reg.	7th	
1980–81	5	Reg. Pref.	20th	
1981–82	6	1ª Reg.	3rd	
1982–83	6	1ª Reg.	6th	
1983–84	5	Reg. Pref.	5th	

Season	Tier	Division	Place	Copa del Rey
1984–85	5	Reg. Pref.	5th	
1985–86	5	Reg. Pref.	6th	
1986–87	5	Reg. Pref.	1st	
1987–88	4	3ª	7th	
1988–89	4	3ª	3rd	
1989–90	4	3ª	8th	
1990–91	4	3ª	3rd	
1991–92	4	3ª	2nd	
1992–93	3	2ª B	10th	
1993–94	3	2ª B	8th	
1994–95	3	2ª B	3rd	
1995–96	2	2ª	13th	
1996–97	2	2ª	20th	
1997–98	3	2ª B	15th	
1998–99	3	2ª B	15th	
1999–2000	3	2ª B	14th	
2000–01	3	2ª B	10th	
2001–02	3	2ª B	9th	
2002–03	3	2ª B	8th	
2003–04	3	2ª B	9th	

Season	Tier	Division	Place	Copa del Rey
2004–05	3	2ª B	12th	
2005–06	3	2ª B	5th	
2006–07	3	2ª B	10th	
2007–08	3	2ª B	1st	
2008–09	3	2ª B	13th	
2009–10	3	2ª B	10th	
2010–11	3	2ª B	9th	
2011–12	3	2ª B	15th	
2012–13	3	2ª B	8th	
2013–14	3	2ª B	20th	
2014–15	4	3ª	9th	
2015–16	4	3ª	12th	
2016–17	4	3ª	3rd	
2017–18	3	2ª B	17th	
2018–19	4	3ª	19th	
2019–20	4	3ª	DQ	
2020–21	5	Div. Hon.	10th	
2021–22	7	1ª And.	8th	
2022–23	8	2ª And.	15th	
2023–24	9	3ª And.	1st	

Season	Tier	Division	Place	Copa del Rey
2024–25	8	2ª And.	4th	
2025–26	8	2ª And.		

- 2 seasons in Segunda División
- 21 seasons in Segunda División B
- 10 seasons in Tercera División

== Stadium ==
Écija holds home games at Estadio San Pablo, with a capacity of 6,000 seats.

== Famous players ==
- (Spain) Nolito
- (Spain) Rafael Gordillo
- (Spain) Rubén Pérez
- (Nigeria) Wilfred Agbonavbare
- (Spain) Antoñito
- (Spain) Pepe Mel
- (Spain) Salva Ballesta
- (Spain) Caye Quintana
- (Spain) Javi Lara
- (Spain) Fernando Seoane
- (Azerbaijan) Vali Gasimov
