= Óscar Fornés =

Spanish footballer

Personal information
- Full name: Óscar Fornés López
- Date of birth: 2 March 1983 (age 43)
- Place of birth: Benicarló, Spain
- Height: 1.84 m (6 ft 0 in)
- Position: Goalkeeper

Youth career
- Villarreal

Senior career*
Years	Team	Apps	(Gls)
2002–2003	San Mateo		
2003–2004	Castellón B		
2004–2006	Elche B		
2006	Elche	1	(0)
2006–2008	Villajoyosa	32	(0)
2008–2009	Gavà	23	(0)
2009–2010	Caravaca	37	(0)
2010–2011	Benidorm	38	(0)
2011–2012	Teruel	12	(0)
2012–2014	Olot	59	(0)
2014–2015	Torrevieja	50	(0)
2015–2018	Crevillente	92	(0)
2018–2021	La Nucía	88	(0)
2021–2022	Orihuela	36	(0)
2022–2023	Callosa Deportiva	34	(0)
- * Club domestic league appearances and goals

Óscar Fornés López (born 2 March 1983) is a Spanish former footballer who played as a goalkeeper.

== Club career ==
Born in Benicarló, Province of Castellón, Valencian Community, Fornés finished his youth career with local club Villarreal CF, and made his senior debut with amateurs UD San Mateo in the 2002–03 season. The following year, he joined CD Castellón B.

In the summer of 2004, Fornés signed with Elche CF, being initially assigned to the reserves in the Tercera División. On 17 June 2006 he played his only professional match, starting in a 2–2 Segunda División away draw against Real Valladolid.

Fornés competed in the Segunda División B but also in the fourth tier the following years, representing Villajoyosa CF, CF Gavà, Caravaca CF, Benidorm CF, CD Teruel and UE Olot. With the latter side, he achieved promotion to division three in 2013, appearing in 28 games and conceding only 21 goals during the campaign.
