= Oinatz Aulestia =

Spanish footballer

Personal information
- Full name: Oinatz Aulestia Alkorta
- Date of birth: 23 March 1981 (age 45)
- Place of birth: Ondarroa, Spain
- Height: 1.84 m (6 ft 1/2 in)
- Position: Goalkeeper

Youth career
- Eibar

Senior career*
Years	Team	Apps	(Gls)
2000–2002	Eibar B	66	(0)
2002–2003	Pájara Playas	5	(0)
2003–2005	Bilbao Athletic	18	(0)
2005–2007	Cultural Leonesa	71	(0)
2007–2011	Oviedo	136	(0)
2011–2013	Cádiz	69	(0)
2013–2014	Hércules	9	(0)
2014–2015	Cádiz	36	(0)
2015–2016	Hospitalet	29	(0)
2016–2018	Atlético Baleares	61	(0)
2018–2019	El Ejido	36	(0)
2019–2020	Arenas Getxo	9	(0)
Total		545	(0)
- * Club domestic league appearances and goals

Oinatz Aulestia Alkorta (born 23 March 1981) is a Spanish former footballer who played as a goalkeeper.

He appeared in 474 Segunda División B matches in a 20-year senior career, in service of a host of clubs. His professional input consisted of nine Segunda División games for Hércules.

== Club career ==
Born in Ondarroa, Biscay, Basque Country, Aulestia finished his youth career with SD Eibar, and made his senior debut with their B team in the 2000–01 season. He played in the Segunda División B but also in the Tercera División the following years, representing UD Pájara Playas de Jandía, Bilbao Athletic, Cultural y Deportiva Leonesa, Real Oviedo and Cádiz CF.

On 30 July 2013, Aulestia signed with Segunda División club Hércules CF. On 11 September, aged 32, he appeared in his first professional match, a 2–0 home win over Real Murcia in the second round of the Copa del Rey. His first league appearance took place on 9 November in another victory for the hosts, now against UD Las Palmas (2–1).

Aulestia returned to the third tier after leaving the Estadio José Rico Pérez at the end of the campaign, retiring well past his 30s.
