= UE Figueres =

Spanish association football team

Figueres
- Full name: Unió Esportiva Figueres
- Founded: 1919 (reformed in 2007)
- Ground: Vilatenim, Figueres, Catalonia, Spain
- Capacity: 9,472
- President: Daniel Sala Peix
- Head coach: Héctor Simón
- League: Primera Catalana – Group 1
- 2025–26: Primera Catalana – Group 1, 12th of 16
Home colours	Away colours

Unió Esportiva Figueres is a Spanish football team based in Figueres, in the autonomous community of Catalonia. Founded in 1919 and refounded in 2007, it plays in the Primera Catalana league, holding home matches at Estadi Municipal de Vilatenim, with a seating capacity of 9,472.

== History ==
Figueres was first founded on April 13, 1919. Bernat Palmer was elected as its first president, and Camp de l’Horta de l’Institut became its first stadium. In 1983 the club first reached Segunda División B, and promoted to Segunda División only three years later, maintaining that status for seven seasons and appearing once in the La Liga promotion playoffs after finishing third in the regular season; it eventually lost on aggregate to Cádiz.

In the 2001-02 season, Figueres became the first club from third division to advance to the Copa del Rey semi-finals. Their campaign began with a 10-1 aggregate victory over CD Teruel. In the following round, the round of 64 Figueres was faced with powerhouse Barcelona, beating them in extra time in historic fashion. In the round of 32, the club eliminated another first division club, this time beating Osasuna on penalties after a 0–0 draw. In the round of 16, which was now played over two legs, Figueres beat Novelda 2–1 on aggregate. In the quarter-finals, Figueres pulled off another upset, beating Second division club Córdoba 2–0 on aggregate. In the semi-finals, Figueres was faced with Deportivo de La Coruña, one of the best teams in Spain at the time and league champions in 2000. The first leg in Figueres ended in a 1–0 loss, and the second leg ended in a 1–1 draw, with Figueres being eliminated and Deportivo going on to beat Real Madrid in the final.

For most of the 90s and 2000s, Figueres was consolidated in the third level, only now and then vying for promotion. On 27 June 2007 the principal shareholder transferred the club to Castelldefels due to little support of the public, and the side would eventually disappear.

In August 2007 UE Figueres was refounded by minority shareholders, with the team starting playing in the lowest division of Spanish football, Quarta Catalana.

== Season to season ==
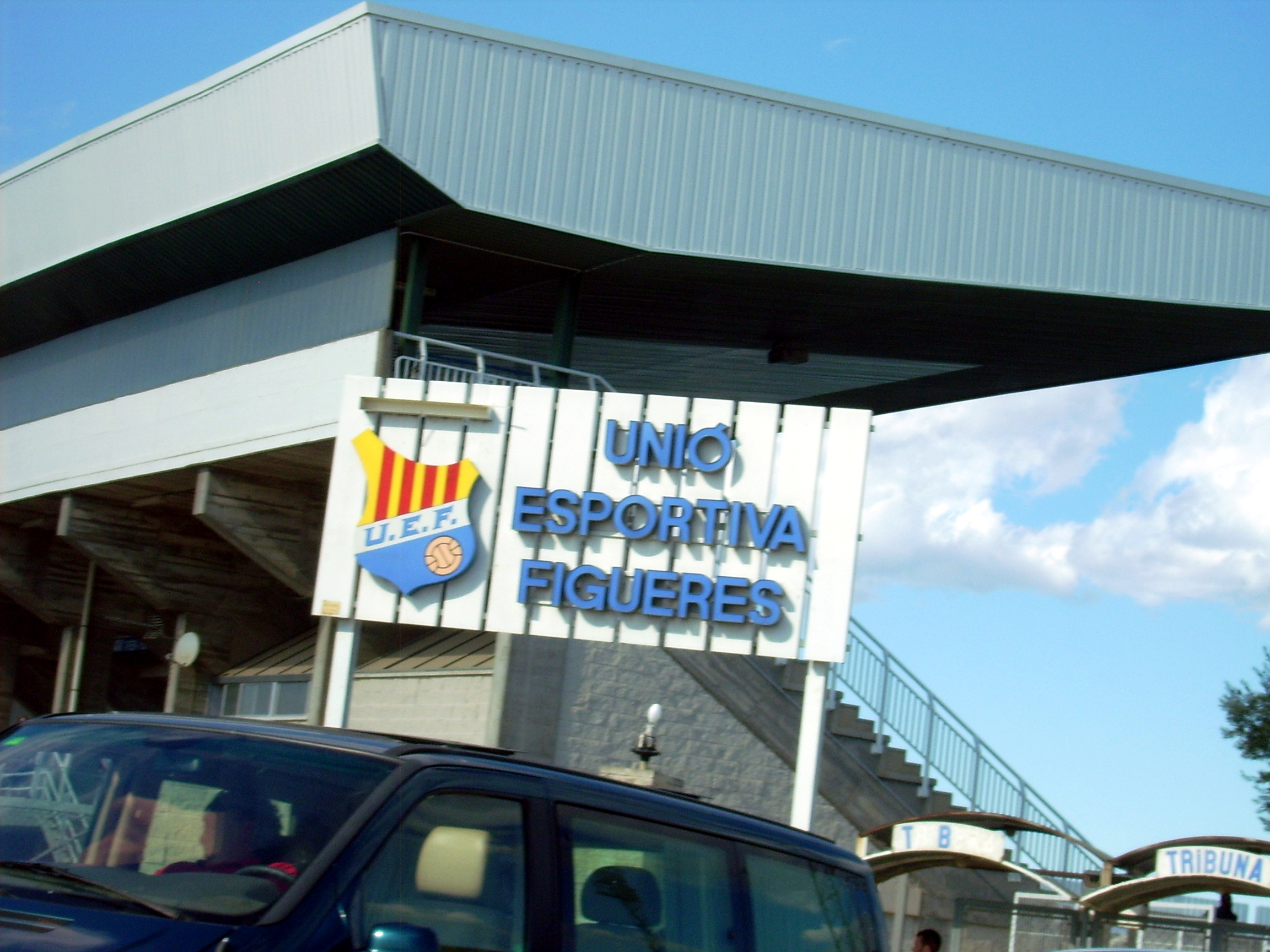
Vilatenim stadium

Season	Tier	Division	Place	Copa del Rey
1940–41	6	2ª Reg.	1st	
1941–42	4	1ª Reg. B	4th	
1942–43	3	1ª Reg. A	5th	
1943–44	3	3ª	10th	
1944–45	4	1ª Reg. A	5th	
1945–46	4	1ª Reg. A	12th	
1946–47	5	2ª Reg.	1st	
1947–48	4	1ª Reg. A	10th	
1948–49	4	1ª Reg. A	10th	
1949–50	4	1ª Reg. A	9th	
1950–51	4	1ª Reg. A	7th	
1951–52	4	1ª Reg. A	5th	
1952–53	4	1ª Reg. A	10th	
1953–54	4	1ª Reg.	15th	
1954–55	4	1ª Reg.	5th	
1955–56	4	1ª Reg.	11th	
1956–57	3	3ª	16th	
1957–58	3	3ª	6th	
1958–59	3	3ª	5th	
1959–60	3	3ª	1st	

Season	Tier	Division	Place	Copa del Rey
1960–61	3	3ª	7th	
1961–62	3	3ª	3rd	
1962–63	3	3ª	12th	
1963–64	4	1ª Reg.	13th	
1964–65	4	1ª Reg.	2nd	
1965–66	3	3ª	14th	
1966–67	3	3ª	10th	
1967–68	3	3ª	10th	
1968–69	3	3ª	17th	
1969–70	3	3ª	9th	
1970–71	4	Reg. Pref.	15th	
1971–72	4	Reg. Pref.	3rd	
1972–73	4	Reg. Pref.	6th	
1973–74	4	Reg. Pref.	4th	
1974–75	4	Reg. Pref.	5th	
1975–76	4	Reg. Pref.	7th	
1976–77	4	Reg. Pref.	2nd	
1977–78	4	3ª	2nd	
1978–79	4	3ª	8th	
1979–80	4	3ª	3rd	

Season	Tier	Division	Place	Copa del Rey
1980–81	4	3ª	2nd	
1981–82	4	3ª	3rd	
1982–83	4	3ª	2nd	
1983–84	3	2ª B	4th	
1984–85	3	2ª B	6th	
1985–86	3	2ª B	1st	
1986–87	2	2ª	14th	First round
1987–88	2	2ª	7th	Round of 32
1988–89	2	2ª	9th	Third round
1989–90	2	2ª	12th	First round
1990–91	2	2ª	7th	Third round
1991–92	2	2ª	3rd	Fourth round
1992–93	2	2ª	17th	Round of 32
1993–94	3	2ª B	4th	Third round

Season	Tier	Division	Place	Copa del Rey
1994–95	3	2ª B	9th	Second round
1995–96	3	2ª B	3rd	
1996–97	3	2ª B	4th	First round
1997–98	3	2ª B	7th	Third round
1998–99	3	2ª B	8th	
1999–00	3	2ª B	6th	
2000–01	3	2ª B	8th	Second round
2001–02	3	2ª B	13th	Semifinals
2002–03	3	2ª B	16th	
2003–04	3	2ª B	13th	
2004–05	3	2ª B	8th	
2005–06	3	2ª B	14th	
2006–07	3	2ª B	12th (Note: Renamed UE Miapuesta Castelldefels)	

- 7 seasons in Segunda División
- 17 seasons in Segunda División B
- 19 seasons in Tercera División

=== Team refounded ===
Season	Tier	Division	Place	Copa del Rey
2007–08	9	3ª Terr.	1st	
2008–09	8	2ª Terr.	1st	
2009–10	7	1ª Terr.	1st	
2010–11	6	Pref. Terr.	2nd	
2011–12	5	1ª Cat.	1st	
2012–13	4	3ª	6th	
2013–14	4	3ª	11th	
2014–15	4	3ª	4th	
2015–16	4	3ª	10th	
2016–17	4	3ª	9th	
2017–18	4	3ª	10th	
2018–19	4	3ª	12th	
2019–20	4	3ª	13th	
2020–21	4	3ª	9th / 4th	
2021–22	5	3ª RFEF	15th	
2022–23	6	1ª Cat.	4th	
2023–24	6	Lliga Elit	5th	
2024–25	6	Lliga Elit	14th	
2025–26	7	1ª Cat.		

- 9 seasons in Tercera División
- 1 season in Tercera División RFEF

== Famous players ==
Note: this list includes players that have played at least 70 league games and/or have reached international status.

- (Germany) Emil Walter
- (Andorra) Marc Pujol
- (Andorra) (Spain) Justo Ruiz
- (Equatorial Guinea) (Spain) Juan Cuyami
- (Spain) Francisco Carrasco
- (Spain) Luis Cembranos
- (Spain) Martín Domínguez
- (Spain) Pere Gratacós
- (Spain) Toni Jiménez
- (Spain) Tintín Márquez
- (Spain) Albert Serra
- (Spain) Tito Vilanova
- (United States) (Uruguay) Tab Ramos
- (United States) Peter Vermes
- (Uruguay) José Herrera

Category:UE Figueres footballers

== Famous coaches ==
- (Spain) Pichi Alonso
- (Spain) Francisco
- (Spain) Mané
