= Segunda División B =

Former third tier of the football pyramid of professional football league in Spain

- Founded: 1977
- Folded: 2021
- Country: Spain
- Other club from: Andorra (1 team)
- Divisions: 4
- Number of clubs: 4 groups of 20 teams each (80); 3 groups of 20 teams and 2 group of 21, 8 subgroups of 10 teams each and 2 subgroups of 11 in 2020–21 (102)
- Level on pyramid: 3
- Promotion to: Segunda División
- Relegation to: Tercera División
- Domestic cup(s): Copa del Rey; Copa Federación
- Last champions: Burgos (Group 1); Real Sociedad B (Group 2); UD Ibiza (Group 3); Linares Deportivo (Group 4); Badajoz (Group 5)
- Broadcasters: FORTA: ETB 1, laOtra, tvG2, TPA; IB3, TV Melilla; Real Madrid TV, SFC TV
- Website: Official website

Segunda División B (English: second division B) was the third tier of the Spanish football league system containing 102 teams divided into five groups, until it was replaced by the new structure in 2021. It was administered by the Royal Spanish Football Federation. It was below the top two professional leagues, the Primera División (also known as La Liga) and the Segunda División, and above the Tercera División. The Segunda División B included the reserve teams of a number of La Liga and Segunda División teams. As of the 2021-22 season, its successors are the Primera Federación and the Segunda Federación.

The league's last ever season was in 2020-21. For the 2021–22 season, Segunda División B was replaced by Segunda División RFEF, which became the fourth tier due to the creation of a new, semi-professional third division by the Spanish federation (RFEF) called the Primera División RFEF.

== History ==
The term Segunda División B was first used in 1929. It was used to designate a third level of teams after the Primera División and a Segunda División A. This division featured 10 teams and at the end of the season Cultural Leonesa were crowned champions. However, the 1929–30 season saw the first of many reorganisations of the Spanish football league system and the original Segunda División B was replaced by the Tercera División. At the start of the 1977–78 season the Segunda División B was revived, replacing the Tercera División as the third level. Initially the division consisted of only two groups. The 1986–87 season was played as a single group of 22 teams. It was changed the next year, with 80 teams in four groups from the 1987–88 season.

The RFEF approved the expansion of the league initially to five groups of 20 teams each and recommended its further division into 10 subgroups of 10 teams each for ease of schedule, only for the 2020–21 season, due to promotion from the Tercera División groups in the curtailed 2019–20 season being applied. Also, the Segunda División B dropped down to the fourth level and changed its name to Segunda División RFEF on the creation of a new, two-group, 40-team third division called Primera División RFEF, which began to play in the 2021–22 season. An additional two teams were promoted after the 2020 Tercera División play-offs were called off and could not be replayed. In the 2020–21 season, the 102 qualified teams were divided into three groups of 20 and two groups of 21, subdivided into eight subgroups of 10 and two subgroups of 11.

== Historical classification ==
Segunda División B currently features 80 teams divided into 4 groups of 20. The top four teams from each group, 16 teams in total, qualify for play-offs to determine which four teams will replace the four teams relegated from the Segunda División. However reserve teams are only eligible for promotion to the Segunda División if their senior team is in the Primera División. The top five teams from each group and best two teams regardless of group outside the previous twenty, excluding reserve teams, also qualify for the following seasons Copa del Rey. The bottom four teams in each league are relegated to the Tercera División. Also, the four 16th-placed teams enter into a relegation playoff to determine the two teams to be relegated. One team is paired with one of the others in home and away series. the two winners remain in the division while the losers are relegated. A reserve team can also be relegated if their senior team is relegated from the Segunda División. Along with teams from the Tercera División, teams from the division also compete in the Copa Federación.

Since the 2008–09 season, the four group winners had the opportunity to be promoted directly and be named the overall Segunda División B champion. The four group winners are drawn into a two-legged series where the two winners are promoted to the Segunda División and enter into the final for the Segunda División B championship. The two losing semifinalists enter the playoff round for the last two promotion spots.

Until 2019, the four group runners-up were drawn against one of the three fourth-placed teams outside their group while the four third-placed teams were also drawn against one another in a two-legged series. The six winners advanced with the two losing semifinalists to determine the four teams that will enter the last two-legged series for the last two promotion spots. In all the playoff series, the lower-ranked club played at home first. Whenever there was a tie in position (like the group winners in the semifinal round and final or the third-placed teams in the first round), a draw determined the club to play at home first.

In the 2019–20 season, the promotion playoff rules were altered by an RFEF resolution after that season was suspended and later curtailed during the coronavirus disease pandemic in Spain. Thus, the playoffs were contested differently at neutral venues. The four group runners-up were drawn against one of the three fourth-placed teams outside their group while the four third-placed teams were also drawn against one another in knockout matches. The six winners advanced with the two losing semifinalists to determine the four teams that entered the last single-match series for the two remaining promotion spots.

== Promotions by year ==
Starting in 2008–09 season, the four group winners get a spot in the Group Winners Promotion Playoff. The two semifinal winners get promoted to Segunda División and play the final to decide the season champions.

season champions	season runner-ups	other promoted teams

Season	Group winners				Other promoted teams
Season	Group I	Group II	Group III	Group IV	Other promoted teams
1977–78	Racing Ferrol	Almería	—N/a	—N/a	Algeciras, Castilla
1978–79	Palencia	Levante	—N/a	—N/a	Gimnàstic, Oviedo
1979–80	Barakaldo	Linares	—N/a	—N/a	Atlético Madrileño, Ceuta
1980–81	Celta Vigo	Mallorca	—N/a	—N/a	Córdoba, Deportivo La Coruña
1981–82	Barcelona B	Xerez	—N/a	—N/a	Cartagena, Palencia
1982–83	Athletic Bilbao B	Granada	—N/a	—N/a	Algeciras, Tenerife
1983–84	Sabadell	Lorca	—N/a	—N/a	Calvo Sotelo, Logroñés
1984–85	Sestao	Rayo Vallecano	—N/a	—N/a	Albacete, Deportivo Aragón
1985–86	Figueres	Xerez	—N/a	—N/a	
1986–87	Tenerife	—N/a	—N/a	—N/a	Granada, Lleida, Real Burgos
1987–88	Eibar	Mollerussa	Salamanca	Alzira	
1988–89	Athletic Bilbao B	Palamós	Atlético Madrid B	Levante	
1989–90	Avilés	Lleida	Albacete	Orihuela	
1990–91	Real Madrid B	Racing Santander	Badajoz	Barcelona B (Note: Promoted after the administrative relegation to Segunda B of Orihuela.)	Compostela, Mérida
1991–92	Salamanca	Sant Andreu	Cartagena	Marbella	Badajoz, Lugo, Villarreal
1992–93	Leganés	Alavés	Murcia	Las Palmas	Hércules, Toledo
1993–94	Salamanca	Alavés	Gramenet	CF Extremadura	Getafe, Ourense
1994–95	Racing Ferrol	Alavés	Levante	Córdoba	Almería, Écija, Sestao
1995–96	Las Palmas	Sporting Gijón B	Levante	Jaén	Atlético Madrid B, Ourense
1996–97	Sporting Gijón B	Aurrerá Vitoria	Gimnàstic	Córdoba	Elche, Jaén, Numancia, Xerez
1997–98	Cacereño	Barakaldo	Barcelona B	Málaga	Mallorca B, Recreativo
1998–99	Getafe	Cultural Leonesa	Levante	Melilla	Córdoba, Elche
1999–00	Universidad LPGC	Gimnástica Torrelavega	Gandía	Granada	Jaén, Murcia, Racing Ferrol
2000–01	Atlético Madrid B	Burgos	Gramenet	Cádiz	Gimnàstic, Ejido, Xerez
2001–02	Barakaldo	Barcelona B	Real Madrid B	Motril	Almería, Compostela, Getafe, Terrassa
2002–03	Universidad LPGC	Real Unión	Castellón	Algeciras	Cádiz, Ciudad de Murcia, Málaga B
2003–04	Pontevedra	Atlético Madrid B	Lleida	Lanzarote	Gimnàstic, Racing Ferrol
2004–05	Real Madrid B	Ponferradina	Alicante	Sevilla B	Castellón, Hércules, Lorca
2005–06	Universidad LPGC	Salamanca	Badalona	Cartagena	Las Palmas, Ponferradina, Vecindario
2006–07	Pontevedra	Eibar	Alicante	Sevilla Atlético	Córdoba, Racing Ferrol
2007–08	Rayo Vallecano	Ponferradina	Girona	Écija	Alicante, Huesca
2008–09	Real Unión	Cartagena	Alcoyano	Cádiz	Villarreal B
2009–10	Ponferradina	Alcorcón	Sant Andreu	Granada	Barcelona B
2010–11	Lugo	Eibar	Sabadell	Murcia	Alcoyano, Guadalajara
2011–12	Real Madrid Castilla	Mirandés	Atlético Baleares	Cádiz	Lugo, Ponferradina
2012–13	Tenerife	Alavés	L'Hospitalet	Jaén	Eibar
2013–14	Racing Santander	Sestao River	Llagostera	Albacete	Leganés
2014–15	Oviedo	Huesca	Gimnàstic	Cádiz	Bilbao Athletic
2015–16	Racing Santander	Real Madrid Castilla	Reus Deportiu	UCAM Murcia	Cádiz, Sevilla Atlético
2016–17	Cultural Leonesa	Albacete	Barcelona B	Lorca FC	
2017–18	Rayo Majadahonda	Mirandés	Mallorca	Cartagena	Elche, Extremadura UD
2018–19	Fuenlabrada	Racing Santander	Atlético Baleares	Recreativo	Ponferradina, Mirandés
2019–20	Atlético Baleares	UD Logroñés	Castellón	Cartagena	Sabadell

Season	Group winners					Other promoted teams
Season	Group I	Group II	Group III	Group IV	Group V	Other promoted teams
2020–21	Burgos	Real Sociedad B	UD Ibiza	Linares Deportivo	Badajoz	Amorebieta

== Top scorers ==
Goals in playoffs are not counted.

Season	Top scorer	Club	Goals
1977–78	(Spain) José Manuel Traba	Compostela	23
1977–78	(Spain) Gregorio Mollejo	AD Almería	23
1978–79	(Spain) Andoni Murúa	Levante	23
1979–80	(Spain) Marcelino Mateos	Zamora	21
1980–81	(Spain) Luis Alonso	Lleida	21
1981–82	(Spain) Luis Alonso (2)	Barcelona B	20
1981–82	(Spain) Francesc Valverde	Andorra	20
1982–83	(Spain) Ricardo Arrien	Athletic Bilbao B	22
1982–83	(Spain) Agustín Lasaosa	Tenerife	22
1983–84	(Spain) Pepe Mel	Alcalá	30
1984–85	(Spain) Ramón Masqué	Gimnàstic	20
1985–86	(Spain) Antonio Cuevas	Figueres	25
1986–87	(Spain) Manolo Muñoz	Granada	30
1987–88	(Spain) Xavier Escaich	Gimnàstic	25
1988–89	(Spain) Juan Carlos de Diego	Atlético Madrileño	33
1989–90	(Spain) Mariano Azcona	Lleida	26
1989–90	(Spain) Pedro Corbalán	Albacete	26
1990–91	(Spain) Juan Gómez	Alcoyano	24
1991–92	(Spain) Adriano García	Villarreal	24
1992–93	(Spain) Eduardo Rodríguez	Hércules	32
1993–94	(Equatorial Guinea) Julio Engonga	Gimnástica Torrelavega	28
1994–95	(Spain) Javi Prendes	Avilés	24
1994–95	(Spain) José Luis Garzón	Sabadell	24
1995–96	(Spain) Estefan Julià	Sant Andreu	23
1996–97	(Spain) Iván Rosado	Recreativo	25
1997–98	(Spain) Quini	Talavera	26
1998–99	(Spain) Changui	Pontevedra	21
1999–2000	(Spain) Chili	Gimnástica	31
2000–01	(Spain) Quico Rey	Ourense	22
2000–01	(Spain) Egoitz Sukia	Beasain	22
2001–02	(Nigeria) Haruna Babangida	Barcelona B	23
2001–02	(Spain) David Prats	Mataró	23
2002–03	(Spain) Kiko Lacasa	Alavés B	22
2003–04	(Spain) Paulino Martínez	Cultural Leonesa	21
2004–05	(Spain) Kepa Blanco	Sevilla Atlético	23
2005–06	(Spain) Iñigo Díaz de Cerio	Real Sociedad B	24
2006–07	(Brazil) Yuri de Souza	Pontevedra	24
2006–07	(Spain) Javi Moreno	Córdoba	24
2007–08	(Argentina) Luciano Becchio	Mérida	22
2008–09	(Spain) Tariq Spezie	Puertollano	24
2009–10	(Spain) Airam López	Tenerife B	27
2010–11	(Spain) Mikel Arruabarrena	Leganés	21
2011–12	(Spain) Jesús Perera	Atlético Baleares	23
2012–13	(Spain) Aridane Santana	Tenerife	25
2013–14	(Spain) Joselu	Compostela	30
2014–15	(Spain) Miguel Linares	Oviedo	28
2015–16	(Dominican Republic) Mariano Díaz	Real Madrid B	25
2016–17	(Spain) Borja Iglesias	Celta Vigo B	32
2017–18	(Spain) Enric Gallego	Cornellà/Extremadura	27
2018–19	(Spain) Asier Villalibre	Athletic Bilbao B	23
2019–20	(Spain) Rufo Sánchez	Internacional de Madrid/Pontevedra CF	18
2020–21	(Spain) Carlitos	FC Andorra	15

== Top goalkeepers ==
Season	Player	Club	Games	Goals	Coefficient
1977–78	(Spain) Nemesio Alonso	Algeciras	38	27	0.71
1978–79	(Spain) Vicente Amigó	Gimnàstic Tarragona	35	18	0.51
1979–80	(Spain) Millán	Cultural Leonesa	35	26	0.74
1980–81	(Spain) Joan Capó	Celta Vigo	33	17	0.51
1981–82	(Spain) Vicente Gómez	Algeciras	37	22	0.59
1982–83	(Spain) Vicente Gómez (2)	Algeciras	29	13	0.44
1983–84	(Spain) Luciano Casado	CD Logroñés	29	19	0.65
1984–85	(Spain) Juano Muñoz	Algeciras	30	15	0.50
1985–86	(Spain) Carlos Osma	Xerez	38	24	0.63
1986–87	(Spain) Miguel Bastón	Real Burgos	42	20	0.47
1987–88	(Spain) Ángel Lozano	Salamanca	29	14	0.48
1988–89	(Spain) Manolo López	Ceuta	35	16	0.45
1989–90	(Spain) José Luis Montes	Melilla	35	17	0.48
1990–91	(Spain) José Domínguez	Lugo	38	21	0.55
1991–92	(Spain) Luis Raudona	Cartagena	37	14	0.37
1992–93	(Spain) José Miguel Robayna	Las Palmas	28	13	0.46
1993–94	(Spain) Alfonso Núñez	Alavés	35	12	0.34
1994–95	(Spain) Laureano Echevarría	Numancia	35	16	0.46
1995–96	(Spain) Manolo López (2)	Las Palmas	33	18	0.55
1996–97	(Spain) Emilio Álvarez	Jaén	36	23	0.63
1997–98	(Spain) César Quesada	Recreativo	35	20	0.57
1998–99	(Spain) José Carlos Burgos	Polideportivo Almería	30	11	0.37
1999–2000	(Spain) Pedro Dorronsoro	Gimnástica Torrelavega	32	12	0.38
2000–01	(Spain) Armando Riveiro	Cádiz	36	14	0.39
2001–02	(Spain) Urko Macías	Barakaldo	36	19	0.52
2002–03	(Spain) Xavi Oliva	Castellón	35	15	0.42
2003–04	(Spain) Santi Lampón	Vecindario	37	19	0.51
2004–05	(Spain) Manu Herrera	Levante B	35	17	0.48
2005–06	(Spain) Moisés Trujillo	Universidad Las Palmas	30	14	0.46
2006–07	(Spain) Alberto Cifuentes	Rayo Vallecano	34	21	0.61
2007–08	(Spain) Roberto Pampín	Sestao River	35	19	0.54
2007–08	(Spain) Jesús Unanua	Alicante	35	19	0.54
2008–09	(Spain) José Bermúdez	Cultural Leonesa	34	18	0.52
2009–10	(Spain) David Rangel	Ontinyent	38	25	0.65
2010–11	(Spain) Alberto Cifuentes (2)	Murcia	37	20	0.54
2011–12	(Spain) Oinatz Aulestia	Cádiz	35	22	0.62
2012–13	(Spain) Francis Solar	Olímpic Xàtiva	34	15	0.44
2013–14	(Spain) Alberto Cifuentes (3)	La Hoya Lorca	37	19	0.51
2014–15	(Spain) Oinatz Aulestia (2)	Cádiz	36	19	0.52
2015–16	(Spain) Iván Crespo	Lleida Esportiu	36	20	0.55
2016–17	(Spain) Iván Crespo (2)	Racing Santander	36	20	0.55
2017–18	(Spain) Andoni Zubiaurre	Real Sociedad B	29	15	0.52
2018–19	(Spain) Miguel Martínez	UD Logroñés	35	18	0.51
2019–20	(Spain) Marc Martínez	FC Cartagena	28	19	0.68
2020–21	(Spain) Kike Royo	CD Badajoz	23	9	0.39

== Records ==
Most seasons

- 36 – Barakaldo
- 36 – Cultural Leonesa
- 36 – Pontevedra

Most points

- 1,901 – Barakaldo (1.39 per game)
- 1,878 – Cultural Leonesa (1.38 per game)
- 1,773 – Melilla (1.38 per game)

Most games played

- 1,368 – Barakaldo (38 per season)
- 1,366 – Pontevedra (37.94 per season)
- 1,360 – Cultural Leonesa (37.78 per season)

Most wins

- 547 – Cultural Leonesa (40.22%)
- 546 – Barakaldo (39.91%)
- 526 – Pontevedra (38.50%)

Most draws

- 417 – Cultural Leonesa (30.66%)
- 413 – Barakaldo (30.19%)
- 406 – Melilla (31.67%)

Most losses

- 459 – Pontevedra (33.60%)
- 453 – Osasuna B (36.30%)
- 450 – Real Sociedad B (33.78%)

Most goals scored

- 1,719 – Cultural Leonesa (1.26 per game)
- 1,674 – Pontevedra (1.23 per game)
- 1,633 – Barakaldo (1.19 per game)

Most goals conceded

- 1,497 – Pontevedra (1.10 per game)
- 1,446 – Sporting Gijón B (1.23 per game)
- 1,434 – Real Sociedad B (1.08 per game)

Most group championships

- 5 – Levante

Most promotion play-offs played

- 11 – Barakaldo

Most promotions to Segunda División

- 5 – Barcelona B

Highest attendance

- 57,236 – Real Madrid B vs Conquense, at Santiago Bernabéu Stadium on 26 June 2005

=== Scorelines ===
Record win

- Extremadura 12–0 Racing Portuense (2 May 1993)
- Barcelona B 12–0 Eldense (1 April 2017)

Record away win

- Daimiel 0–8 Getafe (1 May 1988)
- Isla Cristina 0–8 Polideportivo Almería (7 February 1999)

== See also ==
- Spanish football league system

== References and notes ==
Sporting positions
Preceded by Tercera División	Third tier of Spanish football 1977–2021	Succeeded by Primera División RFEF
