= 2005–06 Segunda División B =

Segunda División B
- Season: 2005–06
- Champions: Universidad LPGC; Salamanca; Badalona; Cartagena
- Promoted: Salamanca; Las Palmas; Vecindario; Ponferradina

The Segunda División B 2005–06 season was the 29th since its establishment. The first matches of the season were played on 28 August 2005, and the season ended on 28 May 2006 with the promotion play-off finals.

== Group 1 ==
- Teams of Madrid, Galicia, Balearic Islands, Canary Islands and Melilla.

- Scores and Classification - Group 1

- Liguilla de Ascenso:
  - Alcalá - Eliminated in the second round
  - Rayo Vallecano - Eliminated in the first round
  - Real Madrid B - Promoted to the Second Division
  - Universidad de Las Palmas - Eliminated in the first round

- Promoted to this group from Tercera División:
  - Móstoles - Founded in: 1955//, Based in: Móstoles, Madrid//, Promoted from: Group 7
  - San Isidro - Founded in: 1970//, Based in: San Isidro, Canary Islands//, Promoted from: Group 12

- Relegated to this group from Segunda División:
  - Pontevedra - Founded in: 1941//, Based in: Pontevedra, Galicia//, Relegated From: Segunda División

- Relegated to Tercera División:
  - Arteixo - Founded in: 1949//, Based in: Arteixo, Galicia//, Relegated to: Group 1
  - Fuerteventura - Founded in: 2004//, Based in: Puerto del Rosario, Canary Islands//, Relegated to: Group 12
  - Navalcarnero - Founded in: 1961//, Based in: Navalcarnero, Madrid//, Relegated to: Group 7
  - Mallorca B - Founded in: 1983//, Based in: Palma de Mallorca, Balearic Islands//, Relegated to: Group 11

=== Teams ===
Location of teams in Segunda División B Gr. 1 2005–06
Canary Islands

Group 1
| | Team | Founded in | Based in | Ground |
|---|---|---|---|---|
| 1 | Rayo Vallecano | 1924 | Vallecas, Madrid | Teresa Rivero |
| 2 | Leganés | 1928 | Leganés, Madrid | Butarque |
| 3 | Alcalá | 1929 | Alcalá, Madrid | El Val |
| 4 | Pontevedra | 1941 | Pontevedra, Galicia | Pasarón |
| 5 | Las Palmas | 1949 | Las Palmas, Canary Islands | Gran Canaria |
| 6 | Castillo | 1950 | Castillo, Canary Islands | Municipal de Castillo |
| 7 | Ourense | 1952 | Ourense, Galicia | O Couto |
| 8 | Mostoles | 1955 | Móstoles, Madrid | El Soto |
| 9 | Vecindario | 1962 | Vecindario, Canary Islands | Municipal Vecindario |
| 10 | Negreira | 1965 | Negreira, Galicia | Jesús García Calvo |
| 11 | Atlético B | 1970 | Madrid, Madrid | Cerro del Espino |
| 12 | San Isidro | 1970 | San Isidro, Canary Islands | La Palmera |
| 13 | Lanzarote | 1970 | Lanzarote, Canary Islands | Ciudad Deportiva de Lanzarote |
| 14 | Alcorcón | 1971 | Alcorcón, Madrid | Santo Domingo |
| 15 | S.S. Reyes | 1971 | San Sebastián de los Reyes, Madrid | Nuevo Matapiñonera |
| 16 | Melilla | 1976 | Melilla City, Melilla | Álvarez Claro |
| 17 | Fuenlabrada | 1975 | Fuenlabrada, Madrid | La Aldehuela |
| 18 | Celta B | 1988 | Vigo, Galicia | Barreiro |
| 19 | Universidad Las Palmas | 1994 | Las Palmas, Canary Islands | Alfonso Silva |
| 20 | Pájara Playas | 1996 | Pájara, Canary Islands | Benito Alonso |

=== League table ===
| Pos | Team | Pld | W | D | L | GF | GA | GD | Pts | Qualification or relegation |
|---|---|---|---|---|---|---|---|---|---|---|
| 1 | Universidad LPGC | 38 | 21 | 12 | 5 | 53 | 22 | +31 | 75 | Qualification to promotion playoffs |
| 2 | Pontevedra | 38 | 21 | 7 | 10 | 70 | 30 | +40 | 70 | Qualification to promotion playoffs |
| 3 | Las Palmas (P) | 38 | 18 | 13 | 7 | 45 | 24 | +21 | 67 | Qualification to promotion playoffs |
| 4 | Vecindario (P) | 38 | 19 | 9 | 10 | 53 | 36 | +17 | 66 | Qualification to promotion playoffs |
| 5 | Rayo Vallecano | 38 | 16 | 14 | 8 | 48 | 34 | +14 | 62 | Qualification to Copa del Rey |
| 6 | Fuenlabrada | 38 | 16 | 13 | 9 | 42 | 39 | +3 | 61 | Qualification to Copa del Rey |
| 7 | Alcorcón | 38 | 14 | 10 | 14 | 40 | 45 | −5 | 52 | |
| 8 | Melilla | 38 | 14 | 8 | 16 | 37 | 44 | −7 | 50 | |
| 9 | Atlético B | 38 | 13 | 11 | 14 | 40 | 40 | 0 | 50 | |
| 10 | S.S. Reyes | 38 | 11 | 17 | 10 | 39 | 35 | +4 | 50 | |
| 11 | Lanzarote | 38 | 12 | 11 | 15 | 44 | 44 | 0 | 47 | |
| 12 | Pájara PJ | 38 | 11 | 14 | 13 | 57 | 55 | +2 | 47 | |
| 13 | Leganés | 38 | 12 | 10 | 16 | 40 | 48 | −8 | 46 | |
| 14 | Ourense | 38 | 12 | 10 | 16 | 37 | 48 | −11 | 46 | |
| 15 | Celta B | 38 | 12 | 9 | 17 | 44 | 59 | −15 | 45 | |
| 16 | Castillo (R) | 38 | 10 | 15 | 13 | 26 | 38 | −12 | 45 | Qualification to relegation playoffs |
| 17 | Alcalá (R) | 38 | 9 | 12 | 17 | 32 | 50 | −18 | 39 | Relegation to Tercera División |
| 18 | San Isidro (R) | 38 | 9 | 12 | 17 | 35 | 49 | −14 | 39 | Relegation to Tercera División |
| 19 | Móstoles (R) | 38 | 7 | 13 | 18 | 34 | 50 | −16 | 34 | Relegation to Tercera División |
| 20 | Negreira (R) | 38 | 8 | 10 | 20 | 30 | 54 | −24 | 34 | Relegation to Tercera División |

Rules for classification: 1st points; 2nd head-to-head; 3rd goal difference; 4th goals scored
(P) Promoted; (R) Relegated

=== Results ===
| Home \ Away | ALCL | ALCR | ATL | CAS | CEL | FUN | LAN | LPA | LEG | MEL | MOS | NEG | OUR | PAJ | PON | RAY | SAI | SAS | UPG | VEC |
|---|---|---|---|---|---|---|---|---|---|---|---|---|---|---|---|---|---|---|---|---|
| Alcalá | — | 0–0 | 0–0 | 1–0 | 2–2 | 0–2 | 1–1 | 2–2 | 2–1 | 0–1 | 1–1 | 2–1 | 3–1 | 1–3 | 2–1 | 0–1 | 0–0 | 0–1 | 1–2 | 0–1 |
| Alcorcón | 3–1 | — | 1–1 | 2–1 | 3–0 | 1–2 | 1–0 | 1–1 | 1–1 | 1–0 | 0–0 | 0–2 | 2–1 | 2–1 | 1–0 | 2–3 | 1–0 | 0–1 | 1–0 | 1–2 |
| Atlético B | 0–0 | 2–1 | — | 3–2 | 0–2 | 3–2 | 2–0 | 1–1 | 0–1 | 2–0 | 1–1 | 2–0 | 0–1 | 0–0 | 1–1 | 0–1 | 1–0 | 1–1 | 0–2 | 0–1 |
| Castillo | 1–0 | 0–0 | 1–2 | — | 0–1 | 0–0 | 0–1 | 0–0 | 1–1 | 1–0 | 1–0 | 1–1 | 1–0 | 1–1 | 1–0 | 1–1 | 1–0 | 3–1 | 0–4 | 1–1 |
| Celta B | 2–0 | 1–3 | 0–5 | 0–0 | — | 0–1 | 1–2 | 1–0 | 1–3 | 3–0 | 2–2 | 0–0 | 2–2 | 3–1 | 1–2 | 2–0 | 3–1 | 0–0 | 0–1 | 0–3 |
| Fuenlabrada | 2–1 | 1–0 | 0–0 | 0–0 | 3–3 | — | 2–1 | 1–0 | 0–1 | 0–0 | 1–0 | 2–2 | 1–0 | 2–2 | 1–2 | 1–0 | 1–1 | 0–0 | 2–1 | 3–0 |
| Lanzarote | 3–0 | 2–0 | 1–0 | 0–0 | 1–2 | 3–0 | — | 0–1 | 4–2 | 0–0 | 4–2 | 3–0 | 1–2 | 2–2 | 4–3 | 1–2 | 0–0 | 3–2 | 0–3 | 0–0 |
| Las Palmas | 3–0 | 4–0 | 1–0 | 2–0 | 2–2 | 1–1 | 1–0 | — | 0–0 | 2–0 | 3–1 | 1–0 | 1–1 | 0–0 | 0–0 | 1–0 | 2–0 | 2–1 | 2–0 | 2–1 |
| Leganés | 0–1 | 2–2 | 1–2 | 1–2 | 1–0 | 0–1 | 2–1 | 1–1 | — | 1–0 | 2–1 | 3–0 | 1–0 | 1–0 | 1–3 | 1–0 | 1–1 | 1–1 | 0–2 | 3–0 |
| Melilla | 1–2 | 1–3 | 2–1 | 4–2 | 1–3 | 1–2 | 0–0 | 0–0 | 5–2 | — | 2–0 | 2–1 | 2–2 | 1–0 | 0–1 | 3–0 | 1–0 | 2–1 | 1–1 | 2–1 |
| Móstoles | 1–1 | 2–2 | 3–1 | 0–0 | 0–2 | 1–1 | 2–0 | 2–0 | 0–0 | 0–1 | — | 3–0 | 1–3 | 0–1 | 0–1 | 0–3 | 1–2 | 0–0 | 2–1 | 0–1 |
| Negreira | 1–0 | 1–2 | 0–4 | 1–1 | 4–0 | 0–0 | 2–1 | 0–0 | 2–1 | 3–0 | 1–2 | — | 1–1 | 1–1 | 0–4 | 0–1 | 0–1 | 2–0 | 0–1 | 2–4 |
| Ourense | 2–1 | 2–0 | 1–0 | 1–0 | 1–3 | 3–0 | 0–1 | 0–3 | 3–1 | 0–1 | 0–0 | 1–0 | — | 1–0 | 1–0 | 1–4 | 0–2 | 0–0 | 0–0 | 2–3 |
| Pájara PJ | 0–0 | 1–0 | 0–0 | 2–0 | 1–0 | 1–1 | 1–1 | 0–1 | 1–0 | 3–1 | 1–0 | 0–0 | 3–0 | — | 0–0 | 1–1 | 1–2 | 0–2 | 0–1 | 2–0 |
| Pontevedra | 2–2 | 3–1 | 6–0 | 5–0 | 3–1 | 2–0 | 4–1 | 0–1 | 2–1 | 1–0 | 0–1 | 6–0 | 2–0 | 2–0 | — | 1–2 | 2–0 | 3–1 | 1–1 | 0–1 |
| Rayo Vallecano | 0–0 | 1–1 | 0–2 | 1–1 | 3–0 | 2–1 | 1–1 | 2–0 | 2–0 | 1–2 | 1–0 | 0–1 | 0–0 | 2–2 | 1–1 | — | 3–1 | 1–1 | 2–1 | 1–1 |
| San Isidro | 1–2 | 0–1 | 2–1 | 0–1 | 1–1 | 1–2 | 0–0 | 1–2 | 2–0 | 1–0 | 2–2 | 2–1 | 3–2 | 0–0 | 1–4 | 2–2 | — | 1–1 | 1–1 | 1–1 |
| SS Reyes | 5–1 | 0–0 | 1–1 | 1–0 | 2–0 | 1–2 | 0–0 | 2–1 | 1–1 | 0–0 | 1–1 | 1–0 | 3–0 | 1–0 | 1–1 | 1–3 | 2–0 | — | 0–2 | 0–0 |
| Universidad LPGC | 2–1 | 2–0 | 3–0 | 0–0 | 2–0 | 3–1 | 1–0 | 2–1 | 0–0 | 0–0 | 3–1 | 0–0 | 1–1 | 1–1 | 1–0 | 0–0 | 3–1 | 1–0 | — | 3–1 |
| Vecindario | 0–1 | 3–0 | 0–1 | 0–1 | 3–0 | 2–0 | 2–1 | 1–0 | 3–1 | 3–0 | 4–1 | 1–0 | 1–1 | 3–1 | 0–1 | 0–0 | 2–1 | 2–2 | 1–1 | — |

Source: BDFutbol
Legend: Blue = home team win; Yellow = draw; Red = away team win.

=== Top goalscorers ===
| Goalscorers | Team | Goals |
|---|---|---|
| (Brazil) Yuri de Souza | Pontevedra CF | 22 |
| (Serbia) Goran Marić | Celta B | 15 |
| (Spain) Alberto Noah | CD San Isidro | 15 |
| (Brazil) Igor de Souza | Pontevedra CF | 14 |
| (Brazil) Charles | Pontevedra CF | 13 |

=== Top goalkeepers ===
| Goalkeeper | Team | Goals | Matches | Average |
|---|---|---|---|---|
| (Spain) Moisés Trujillo | Universidad de Las Palmas | 14 | 30 | 0.47 |
| (France) Nicolas Bonis | Pontevedra CF | 21 | 30 | 0.70 |
| (Spain) Ramón Sánchez | UD Pájara Playas | 32 | 37 | 0.86 |
| (Spain) Alberto Cifuentes | Rayo Vallecano | 33 | 36 | 0.92 |
| (Spain) Gonzalo López | UD S.S. de los Reyes | 34 | 37 | 0.92 |

== Group 2 ==
- Teams of Basque Country, Castile and León, Cantabria and Asturias.

- Scores and Classification - Group 2

- Liguilla de Ascenso:
  - Zamora - Eliminated on Second Eliminatory
  - Ponferradina - Eliminated on First Eliminatory
  - Burgos - Eliminated on First Eliminatory
  - Real Unión - Eliminated on Second Eliminatory

- Promoted to this group from Tercera División:
  - Oviedo - Founded in: 1926//, Based in: Oviedo, Asturias//, Promoted from: Group 2
  - Real Valladolid B - Founded in: 1944//, Based in: Valladolid, Castile and León//, Promoted from: Group 8
  - Portugalete - Founded in: 1944//, Based in: Portugalete, Basque Country //, Promoted from: Group 4
  - Durango - Founded in: 1919//, Based in: Durango, Basque Country//, Promoted from: Group 4
  - Zalla - Founded in: 1925//, Based in: Zalla, Basque Country//, Promoted from: Group 4
  - Racing Santander B - Founded in: 1926//, Based in: Santander, Cantabria//, Promoted from: Group 3

- Relegated to this group from Segunda División:
  - Salamanca - Founded in: 1923//, Based in: Salamanca, Castile and León//, Relegated from: Segunda División

- Relegated to Tercera División:
  - Mirandes - Founded in: 1927//, Based in: Miranda de Ebro, Castile and León//, Relegated to: Group 8
  - Guijuelo - Founded in: 1974//, Based in: Guijuelo, Castile and León//, Relegated to: Group 8
  - Sestao - Founded in: 1996//, Based in: Sestao, Basque Country//, Relegated to: Group 4
  - Gimnástica - Founded in: 1907//, Based in: Torrelavega, Cantabria//, Relegated to: Group 3
  - Haro - Founded in: 1914//, Based in: Haro, La Rioja//, Relegated to: Group 16

=== Teams ===
Location of teams in Segunda División B Gr. 2 2005–06

Group 2
| | Team | Founded in | Based in | Ground |
|---|---|---|---|---|
| 1 | Real Unión | 1915 | Irún, Basque Country | Stadium Gal |
| 2 | Barakaldo | 1917 | Barakaldo, Basque Country | Lasesarre |
| 3 | Durango | 1919 | Durango, Basque Country | Tabira |
| 4 | Deportivo Alavés B | 1921 | Vitoria, Basque Country | José Luis Compañón |
| 5 | Ponferradina | 1922 | Ponferrada, Castile and León | El Toralín |
| 6 | Cultural Leonesa | 1923 | León, Castile and León | Reino de León |
| 7 | Salamanca | 1923 | Salamanca, Castile and León | Helmántico |
| 8 | Lemona | 1923 | Lemoa, Basque Country | Arlonagusia |
| 9 | Zalla | 1925 | Zalla, Basque Country | Landaberri |
| 10 | Oviedo | 1926 | Oviedo, Asturias | Carlos Tartiere |
| 11 | Racing B | 1926 | Santander, Cantabria | La Albericia |
| 12 | Marino | 1931 | Luanco, Asturias | Miramar |
| 13 | Valladolid B | 1944 | Valladolid, Castile and León | Ciudad Deportiva del Real Valladolid |
| 14 | Portugalete | 1944 | Portugalete, Basque Country | La Florida |
| 15 | Amurrio | 1949 | Amurrio, Basque Country | Basarte |
| 16 | Real Sociedad B | 1951 | San Sebastián, Basque Country | Zubieta |
| 17 | Athletic B | 1964 | Bilbao, Basque Country | Lezama |
| 18 | Zamora | 1969 | Zamora, Castile and León | Ruta de la Plata |
| 19 | Palencia | 1975 | Palencia, Castile and León | La Balastera |
| 20 | Burgos | 1994 | Burgos, Castile and León | El Plantío |

=== League table ===
| Pos | Team | Pld | W | D | L | GF | GA | GD | Pts | Qualification or relegation |
|---|---|---|---|---|---|---|---|---|---|---|
| 1 | Salamanca (P) | 38 | 22 | 9 | 7 | 61 | 33 | +28 | 75 | Qualification to promotion playoffs |
| 2 | Real Sociedad B | 38 | 20 | 5 | 13 | 60 | 34 | +26 | 65 | Qualification to promotion playoffs |
| 3 | Burgos | 38 | 17 | 13 | 8 | 48 | 38 | +10 | 64 | Qualification to promotion playoffs |
| 4 | Ponferradina (P) | 38 | 16 | 14 | 8 | 47 | 32 | +15 | 62 | Qualification to promotion playoffs |
| 5 | Real Unión | 38 | 15 | 11 | 12 | 43 | 30 | +13 | 56 | Qualification to Copa del Rey |
| 6 | Bilbao Athletic | 38 | 14 | 13 | 11 | 40 | 34 | +6 | 55 | |
| 7 | Real Oviedo | 38 | 14 | 13 | 11 | 37 | 35 | +2 | 55 | Qualification to Copa del Rey |
| 8 | Racing B | 38 | 14 | 12 | 12 | 47 | 42 | +5 | 54 | |
| 9 | Lemona | 38 | 13 | 14 | 11 | 27 | 25 | +2 | 53 | |
| 10 | Valladolid B | 38 | 12 | 14 | 12 | 52 | 42 | +10 | 50 | |
| 11 | Marino Luanco | 38 | 13 | 11 | 14 | 38 | 37 | +1 | 50 | |
| 12 | Palencia | 38 | 12 | 13 | 13 | 36 | 34 | +2 | 49 | |
| 13 | Zamora | 38 | 12 | 12 | 14 | 45 | 43 | +2 | 48 | |
| 14 | Cultural Leonesa | 38 | 12 | 11 | 15 | 37 | 45 | −8 | 47 | |
| 15 | Barakaldo | 38 | 11 | 13 | 14 | 32 | 38 | −6 | 46 | |
| 16 | Amurrio | 38 | 10 | 14 | 14 | 36 | 45 | −9 | 44 | Qualification to relegation playoffs |
| 17 | Cultural de Durango (R) | 38 | 12 | 5 | 21 | 36 | 59 | −23 | 41 | Relegation to Tercera División |
| 18 | Alavés B (R) | 38 | 10 | 8 | 20 | 32 | 55 | −23 | 38 | Relegation to Tercera División |
| 19 | Portugalete (R) | 38 | 7 | 16 | 15 | 32 | 55 | −23 | 37 | Relegation to Tercera División |
| 20 | Zalla (R) | 38 | 8 | 11 | 19 | 36 | 66 | −30 | 35 | Relegation to Tercera División |

Rules for classification: 1st points; 2nd head-to-head; 3rd goal difference; 4th goals scored
(P) Promoted; (R) Relegated

=== Results ===
| Home \ Away | ALV | AMU | BAR | BIL | BUR | CDU | CLE | LEM | MAR | OVI | PAL | PON | POR | RAC | RSO | RUN | SAL | VLD | ZAL | ZAM |
|---|---|---|---|---|---|---|---|---|---|---|---|---|---|---|---|---|---|---|---|---|
| Alavés B | — | 1–1 | 1–1 | 0–1 | 0–0 | 4–3 | 0–1 | 1–0 | 0–1 | 0–0 | 1–0 | 1–0 | 1–0 | 2–1 | 0–2 | 1–3 | 0–3 | 0–2 | 1–3 | 3–1 |
| Amurrio | 3–2 | — | 2–1 | 0–0 | 1–1 | 1–2 | 1–0 | 2–0 | 2–2 | 0–1 | 0–2 | 0–0 | 2–0 | 2–2 | 3–1 | 1–1 | 0–0 | 2–1 | 0–3 | 1–0 |
| Barakaldo | 4–1 | 1–0 | — | 0–0 | 3–1 | 0–0 | 1–1 | 0–0 | 1–0 | 1–0 | 1–0 | 0–3 | 2–0 | 0–1 | 0–0 | 0–1 | 1–1 | 0–0 | 0–1 | 1–0 |
| Bilbao Athletic | 2–0 | 1–1 | 1–0 | — | 4–2 | 1–0 | 1–0 | 0–0 | 1–0 | 3–1 | 2–2 | 0–0 | 1–0 | 1–0 | 0–1 | 0–1 | 3–1 | 0–1 | 1–1 | 1–3 |
| Burgos | 1–2 | 2–0 | 2–2 | 1–0 | — | 2–1 | 1–1 | 2–1 | 1–0 | 1–1 | 0–0 | 1–0 | 2–1 | 0–0 | 1–0 | 2–1 | 1–2 | 2–1 | 1–0 | 2–0 |
| Cultural Durango | 1–0 | 1–0 | 0–0 | 0–2 | 1–3 | — | 3–1 | 0–0 | 0–1 | 1–0 | 0–0 | 6–0 | 1–2 | 4–1 | 1–0 | 1–0 | 0–2 | 0–3 | 2–1 | 2–1 |
| Cultural Leonesa | 1–0 | 3–0 | 2–2 | 1–0 | 2–2 | 3–1 | — | 1–0 | 1–1 | 0–0 | 1–2 | 0–1 | 1–1 | 0–0 | 0–3 | 1–0 | 1–4 | 0–3 | 2–1 | 1–2 |
| Lemona | 0–0 | 1–0 | 0–0 | 1–1 | 0–0 | 1–0 | 1–0 | — | 1–0 | 0–0 | 1–0 | 1–0 | 1–0 | 3–1 | 0–1 | 1–0 | 3–0 | 0–0 | 3–1 | 1–1 |
| Marino | 1–0 | 3–1 | 2–0 | 1–2 | 2–2 | 5–0 | 0–2 | 0–3 | — | 0–0 | 0–0 | 1–4 | 4–2 | 1–0 | 1–0 | 0–1 | 0–0 | 1–1 | 1–0 | 2–1 |
| Oviedo | 1–2 | 2–2 | 2–1 | 2–2 | 0–1 | 3–1 | 0–0 | 1–0 | 0–1 | — | 2–1 | 0–1 | 1–0 | 0–0 | 1–2 | 3–1 | 1–1 | 1–1 | 1–0 | 1–0 |
| Palencia | 3–2 | 0–0 | 0–0 | 3–1 | 0–3 | 0–1 | 1–1 | 0–0 | 0–2 | 0–1 | — | 1–1 | 3–1 | 0–0 | 1–0 | 0–1 | 0–0 | 3–0 | 5–2 | 1–0 |
| Ponferradina | 3–0 | 2–2 | 1–0 | 3–1 | 2–1 | 3–0 | 2–1 | 1–1 | 0–0 | 1–1 | 2–1 | — | 4–0 | 0–3 | 1–0 | 0–0 | 0–1 | 0–0 | 4–0 | 2–0 |
| Portugalete | 0–0 | 2–1 | 2–1 | 1–1 | 0–0 | 2–1 | 1–0 | 0–0 | 0–0 | 0–3 | 0–0 | 0–0 | — | 0–1 | 1–1 | 2–0 | 3–2 | 1–1 | 1–1 | 1–1 |
| Racing B | 2–2 | 2–0 | 1–2 | 1–0 | 1–1 | 1–0 | 0–0 | 1–0 | 3–2 | 4–0 | 3–2 | 2–3 | 4–1 | — | 0–2 | 1–1 | 2–1 | 1–1 | 5–2 | 0–0 |
| R. Sociedad B | 3–0 | 1–0 | 0–1 | 2–1 | 3–1 | 1–0 | 5–1 | 4–0 | 3–1 | 2–3 | 0–1 | 2–1 | 1–1 | 3–1 | — | 1–0 | 4–1 | 0–0 | 1–1 | 3–2 |
| Real Unión | 0–0 | 1–0 | 3–1 | 1–1 | 0–1 | 2–0 | 0–1 | 0–0 | 1–0 | 1–1 | 1–1 | 0–0 | 5–0 | 2–0 | 1–0 | — | 1–2 | 3–0 | 3–0 | 1–1 |
| Salamanca | 3–1 | 2–2 | 2–0 | 1–1 | 3–1 | 3–0 | 1–0 | 1–0 | 1–0 | 1–0 | 0–1 | 1–1 | 3–1 | 2–0 | 2–1 | 2–0 | — | 4–1 | 4–0 | 0–1 |
| Valladolid B | 2–1 | 1–2 | 4–2 | 1–1 | 3–1 | 5–0 | 0–2 | 2–0 | 0–0 | 0–1 | 0–1 | 3–0 | 1–1 | 0–2 | 3–0 | 2–2 | 1–2 | — | 5–1 | 0–0 |
| Zalla | 1–0 | 0–1 | 1–2 | 1–0 | 0–2 | 2–2 | 1–2 | 0–2 | 0–0 | 1–2 | 2–0 | 1–1 | 2–2 | 2–0 | 0–7 | 2–1 | 0–0 | 1–1 | — | 1–1 |
| Zamora | 1–2 | 0–0 | 2–0 | 0–2 | 0–0 | 3–0 | 3–2 | 4–1 | 3–2 | 2–0 | 2–1 | 0–0 | 2–2 | 0–0 | 2–0 | 1–3 | 1–2 | 4–2 | 0–0 | — |

Source: BDFutbol
Legend: Blue = home team win; Yellow = draw; Red = away team win.

=== Top goalscorers ===
| Goalscorers | Team | Goals |
|---|---|---|
| (Spain) Iñigo Díaz de Cerio | Real Sociedad B | 24 |
| (Venezuela) Miku | UD Salamanca | 18 |
| (Spain) Nacho | Real Oviedo | 14 |
| (Spain) Borja | Valladolid B | 14 |
| (Spain) Cristóbal Carreño | Valladolid B | 13 |

=== Top goalkeepers ===
| Goalkeeper | Team | Goals | Matches | Average |
|---|---|---|---|---|
| (Spain) Zigor | SD Lemona | 25 | 37 | 0,68 |
| (Spain) Xabier Otermin | Real Unión | 23 | 33 | 0,70 |
| (Spain) Mikel Saizar | Real Sociedad B | 20 | 27 | 0,74 |
| (Spain) Felip | UD Salamanca | 29 | 36 | 0,81 |
| (Spain) Manuel Rubio | SD Ponferradina | 30 | 35 | 0,86 |
| (Spain) Dani Roiz | CF Palencia | 33 | 37 | 0,86 |

== Group 3 ==
- Teams of Catalonia, Navarre, Valencian Community and Aragon.

- Scores and Classification - Group 3

- Liguilla de Ascenso:
  - Alicante - Eliminated on First Eliminatory
  - Hércules - Promoted to Second Division
  - Zaragoza B - Eliminated on First Eliminatory
  - Castellón - Promoted to Second Division

- Promoted to this group from Tercera División:
  - Sant Andreu - Founded in: 1907//, Based in: Barcelona, Catalonia//, Promoted from: Group 5
  - L'Hospitalet - Founded in: 1957//, Based in: L'Hospitalet de Llobregat, Catalonia//, Promoted from: Group 5
  - Reus - Founded in: 1909//, Based in: Reus, Catalonia //, Promoted from: Group 5

- Relegated to this group from Segunda División:
  - Terrassa - Founded in: 1906//, Based in: Terrassa, Catalonia//, Relegated From: Segunda División

- Relegated to Tercera División:
  - Peña Sport - Founded in: 1925//, Based in: Tafalla, Navarre//, Relegated to: Group 15
  - Novelda - Founded in: 1925//, Based in: Novelda, Valencian Community//, Relegated to: Group 6
  - RCD Espanyol B - Founded in: 1994//, Based in: Barcelona, Catalonia//, Relegated to: Group 5
  - Girona - Founded in: 1929//, Based in: Girona, Catalonia//, Relegated to: Group 5

=== Teams ===
Location of teams in Segunda División B Gr. 3 2005–06

Group 3
| | Team | Founded in | Based in | Ground |
|---|---|---|---|---|
| 1 | Badalona | 1903 | Badalona, Catalonia | Camp del Centenari |
| 2 | Sabadell | 1903 | Sabadell, Catalonia | Nova Creu Alta |
| 3 | Terrasa | 1906 | Terrassa, Catalonia | Olímpic de Terrassa |
| 4 | Peralta | 1908 | Peralta, Navarre | Las Luchas |
| 5 | Sant Andreu | 1909 | Barcelona, Catalonia | Narcís Sala |
| 6 | Reus | 1909 | Reus, Catalonia | Camp Nou Municipal |
| 7 | Alicante | 1918 | Alicante, Valencian Community | José Rico Pérez |
| 8 | Figueres | 1919 | Figueres, Catalonia | Vilatenim |
| 9 | Alfaro | 1922 | Alfaro, La Rioja | La Molineta |
| 10 | Alcoyano | 1929 | Alcoy/Alcoi, Valencian Community | El Collao |
| 11 | Levante B | 1939 | Valencia, Valencian Community | Ciudad Deportiva de Buñol |
| 12 | Vila-Joiosa | 1944 | Vila-Joiosa, Valencian Community | Nou Pla |
| 13 | Gramenet | 1945 | Santa Coloma de Gramenet, Catalonia | Nou Municipal |
| 14 | L'Hospitalet | 1957 | L'Hospitalet de Llobregat, Catalonia | La Feixa Llarga |
| 15 | Huesca | 1960 | Huesca, Aragón | El Alcoraz |
| 16 | Osasuna B | 1964 | Pamplona, Navarre | Tajonar |
| 17 | Benidorm | 1964 | Benidorm, Valencian Community | Foietes |
| 18 | Zaragoza B | 1965 | Zaragoza, Aragón | Ciudad Deportiva del Real Zaragoza |
| 19 | Barcelona B | 1970 | Barcelona, Catalonia | Mini Estadi |
| 20 | Logroñés CF | 2000 | Logroño, La Rioja | Las Gaunas |

=== League table ===
| Pos | Team | Pld | W | D | L | GF | GA | GD | Pts | Qualification or relegation |
|---|---|---|---|---|---|---|---|---|---|---|
| 1 | Badalona | 38 | 20 | 7 | 11 | 52 | 45 | +7 | 67 | Qualification to promotion playoffs |
| 2 | Levante B | 38 | 18 | 12 | 8 | 43 | 26 | +17 | 66 | Qualification to promotion playoffs |
| 3 | Alicante | 38 | 18 | 12 | 8 | 60 | 34 | +26 | 66 | Qualification to promotion playoffs |
| 4 | Gramenet | 38 | 19 | 9 | 10 | 51 | 34 | +17 | 66 | Qualification to promotion playoffs |
| 5 | Alcoyano | 38 | 18 | 10 | 10 | 43 | 29 | +14 | 64 | Qualification to Copa del Rey |
| 6 | Barcelona B | 38 | 19 | 6 | 13 | 60 | 41 | +19 | 63 | |
| 7 | Benidorm | 38 | 15 | 16 | 7 | 59 | 40 | +19 | 61 | Qualification to Copa del Rey |
| 8 | Villajoyosa | 38 | 16 | 10 | 12 | 49 | 40 | +9 | 58 | |
| 9 | Osasuna B | 38 | 14 | 15 | 9 | 44 | 39 | +5 | 57 | |
| 10 | Terrassa | 38 | 16 | 8 | 14 | 48 | 43 | +5 | 56 | |
| 11 | Sant Andreu | 38 | 15 | 10 | 13 | 47 | 40 | +7 | 55 | |
| 12 | L'Hospitalet | 38 | 13 | 9 | 16 | 56 | 50 | +6 | 48 | |
| 13 | Alfaro | 38 | 10 | 14 | 14 | 26 | 38 | −12 | 44 | |
| 14 | Figueres | 38 | 11 | 10 | 17 | 36 | 48 | −12 | 43 | |
| 15 | Logroñés | 38 | 10 | 12 | 16 | 24 | 39 | −15 | 42 | |
| 16 | Huesca | 38 | 10 | 12 | 16 | 30 | 43 | −13 | 42 | Qualification to relegation playoffs |
| 17 | Reus (R) | 38 | 9 | 12 | 17 | 44 | 58 | −14 | 39 | Relegation to Tercera División |
| 18 | Sabadell (R) | 38 | 8 | 13 | 17 | 39 | 54 | −15 | 37 | Relegation to Tercera División |
| 19 | Zaragoza B (R) | 38 | 9 | 8 | 21 | 34 | 54 | −20 | 35 | Relegation to Tercera División |
| 20 | Peralta (R) | 38 | 5 | 9 | 24 | 27 | 77 | −50 | 24 | Relegation to Tercera División |

Rules for classification: 1st points; 2nd head-to-head; 3rd goal difference; 4th goals scored
(R) Relegated

=== Results ===
| Home \ Away | ALC | ALF | ALI | BAD | BAR | BEN | FIG | GRA | HOS | HUE | LEV | LCF | OSA | PER | REU | SAB | SAN | TER | VIJ | ZAR |
|---|---|---|---|---|---|---|---|---|---|---|---|---|---|---|---|---|---|---|---|---|
| Alcoyano | — | 0–0 | 2–1 | 1–0 | 2–0 | 1–1 | 0–0 | 1–1 | 1–0 | 1–0 | 2–0 | 2–1 | 1–1 | 2–1 | 2–1 | 0–1 | 2–1 | 0–1 | 2–1 | 2–0 |
| Alfaro | 0–2 | — | 0–3 | 0–0 | 2–1 | 0–1 | 1–0 | 0–2 | 0–0 | 1–0 | 1–0 | 1–0 | 0–1 | 1–1 | 1–1 | 2–0 | 0–0 | 2–2 | 1–1 | 2–0 |
| Alicante | 1–1 | 1–0 | — | 3–0 | 2–1 | 2–2 | 0–2 | 0–0 | 3–3 | 0–0 | 1–2 | 3–0 | 1–0 | 0–1 | 4–1 | 4–2 | 1–0 | 2–1 | 1–0 | 1–1 |
| Badalona | 3–2 | 3–0 | 2–0 | — | 0–4 | 1–1 | 2–1 | 1–1 | 5–1 | 0–0 | 0–1 | 2–1 | 1–1 | 2–1 | 2–1 | 4–3 | 2–1 | 3–2 | 3–2 | 1–0 |
| Barcelona At. | 1–0 | 0–1 | 1–0 | 1–1 | — | 2–3 | 2–0 | 3–1 | 2–1 | 1–2 | 1–1 | 3–0 | 3–1 | 3–1 | 4–0 | 3–0 | 0–2 | 1–1 | 4–0 | 2–1 |
| Benidorm | 1–1 | 1–1 | 1–1 | 1–0 | 2–0 | — | 5–0 | 0–2 | 0–0 | 4–0 | 0–1 | 2–0 | 2–0 | 4–0 | 2–2 | 2–1 | 2–0 | 3–1 | 0–0 | 3–3 |
| Figueres | 2–1 | 2–2 | 1–1 | 2–1 | 0–2 | 1–2 | — | 0–1 | 3–2 | 0–1 | 2–0 | 0–1 | 1–1 | 2–0 | 2–1 | 0–0 | 1–1 | 0–1 | 1–1 | 0–2 |
| Gramenet | 1–0 | 2–0 | 0–2 | 2–0 | 4–0 | 2–0 | 5–1 | — | 3–2 | 1–0 | 1–2 | 1–1 | 1–1 | 3–0 | 2–1 | 2–1 | 2–1 | 3–0 | 0–0 | 2–1 |
| L'Hospitalet | 0–1 | 3–1 | 1–2 | 0–1 | 1–1 | 2–1 | 2–0 | 0–1 | — | 1–1 | 0–0 | 1–0 | 1–1 | 5–1 | 4–1 | 2–0 | 2–1 | 1–2 | 1–3 | 4–0 |
| Huesca | 1–0 | 1–0 | 1–1 | 1–2 | 1–2 | 1–2 | 1–0 | 0–1 | 2–1 | — | 1–0 | 1–1 | 1–1 | 2–0 | 1–2 | 0–0 | 0–0 | 1–1 | 1–1 | 0–2 |
| Levante B | 0–0 | 0–0 | 0–4 | 2–0 | 1–0 | 1–0 | 2–0 | 4–0 | 0–0 | 1–1 | — | 2–1 | 3–0 | 2–2 | 1–0 | 0–0 | 1–1 | 1–0 | 3–0 | 1–0 |
| Logroñés CF | 0–0 | 0–0 | 0–2 | 1–0 | 0–0 | 1–1 | 0–2 | 2–0 | 0–3 | 1–0 | 0–1 | — | 0–2 | 2–0 | 1–1 | 0–2 | 0–0 | 1–0 | 0–0 | 2–0 |
| Osasuna B | 2–1 | 1–2 | 1–1 | 2–0 | 2–2 | 3–2 | 0–0 | 2–1 | 2–2 | 2–1 | 0–0 | 1–2 | — | 1–0 | 1–0 | 2–0 | 2–3 | 0–1 | 1–1 | 2–0 |
| Peralta | 1–3 | 2–1 | 0–4 | 0–1 | 0–3 | 1–1 | 0–3 | 1–1 | 0–2 | 2–0 | 1–3 | 1–0 | 1–1 | — | 1–0 | 0–0 | 0–3 | 0–4 | 0–3 | 1–1 |
| Reus | 1–3 | 1–1 | 1–1 | 1–1 | 3–1 | 1–2 | 1–1 | 1–0 | 3–2 | 0–0 | 1–0 | 0–0 | 1–2 | 3–1 | — | 1–1 | 1–3 | 2–1 | 2–3 | 1–1 |
| Sabadell | 2–1 | 1–0 | 0–0 | 0–1 | 1–2 | 2–2 | 1–2 | 0–0 | 1–3 | 4–2 | 0–3 | 3–1 | 0–1 | 2–2 | 1–1 | — | 1–1 | 2–1 | 1–1 | 4–1 |
| Sant Andreu | 2–1 | 2–1 | 3–1 | 1–2 | 0–3 | 1–1 | 1–2 | 1–0 | 3–1 | 2–3 | 0–0 | 0–0 | 1–1 | 1–0 | 2–1 | 2–1 | — | 3–0 | 2–0 | 1–0 |
| Terrassa | 0–1 | 0–0 | 2–1 | 1–2 | 3–0 | 1–1 | 1–0 | 2–0 | 2–0 | 2–0 | 2–1 | 1–1 | 1–1 | 4–2 | 2–0 | 1–1 | 2–0 | — | 0–1 | 0–3 |
| Villajoyosa | 0–1 | 3–0 | 0–1 | 3–1 | 1–0 | 3–0 | 2–1 | 1–1 | 2–1 | 3–0 | 2–1 | 0–1 | 0–1 | 1–1 | 1–3 | 1–0 | 2–1 | 3–1 | — | 2–0 |
| Zaragoza B | 0–0 | 0–1 | 1–4 | 0–2 | 0–1 | 1–1 | 1–1 | 2–1 | 0–1 | 0–2 | 2–2 | 1–2 | 1–0 | 3–1 | 0–2 | 3–0 | 1–0 | 0–1 | 2–1 | — |

Source: BDFutbol
Legend: Blue = home team win; Yellow = draw; Red = away team win.

=== Top goalscorers ===
| Goalscorers | Team | Goals |
|---|---|---|
| (Spain) Sendoa | Alicante CF | 22 |
| (Spain) Chando | Reus | 17 |
| (Spain) Sergio Postigo | CE L'Hospitalet | 16 |
| (Spain) Gorka Pintado | UDA Gramenet | 16 |
| (Spain) Antonio Cañadas | CE Sabadell FC | 15 |
| (Spain) Joan Verdú | Barcelona B | 15 |

=== Top goalkeepers ===
| Goalkeeper | Team | Goals | Matches | Average |
|---|---|---|---|---|
| (Spain) Fernando Maestro | CD Alcoyano | 29 | 38 | 0,76 |
| (Spain) Chema | Alicante CF | 28 | 34 | 0,82 |
| (Spain) David Atiega | CD Alfaro | 28 | 32 | 0,88 |
| (Spain) Juan Carlos Castilla | UDA Gramenet | 34 | 38 | 0,89 |
| (Spain) Emilio Muñoz | Villajoyosa CF | 36 | 37 | 0,97 |

== Group 4 ==
- Teams of Andalusia, Extremadura, Castile La Mancha, Ceuta and Murcia.

- Scores and Classification - Group 4

- Liguilla de Ascenso:
  - Sevilla B - Eliminated on First Eliminatory
  - Conquense - Eliminated in Second Eliminatory
  - Ceuta - Eliminated on First Eliminatory
  - Lorca - Promoted to Second Division

- Promoted to this group from Tercera División:
  - Baza - Founded in: 1970//, Based in: Baza, Andalusia//, Promoted from: Group 9
  - Villanueva - Founded in: 1951//, Based in: Villanueva de Córdoba, Andalusia//, Promoted from: Group 10
  - Mérida - Founded in: 1990//, Based in: Mérida, Extremadura //, Promoted from: Group 14
  - Águilas - Founded in: 1925//, Based in: Aguilas, Murcia //, Promoted from: Group 13
  - Almansa - Founded in: 1992//, Based in: Almansa, Castile La Mancha //, Promoted from: Group 18

- Relegated to this group from Segunda División:
  - Córdoba - Founded in: 1954//, Based in: Córdoba, Andalusia//, Relegated From: Second Division

- Relegated to Tercera División:
  - Arenas - Founded in: 1931//, Based in: Armilla, Andalusia//, Relegated to: Group IX
  - Don Benito - Founded in: 1928//, Based in: Don Benito, Extremadura//, Relegated to: Group XIV
  - Jerez - Founded in: 1969//, Based in: Jerez de los Caballeros, Extremadura//, Relegated to: Group XIV
  - Tomelloso - Founded in: 1979//, Based in: Tomelloso, Castile La Mancha//, Relegated to: Group XVII

=== Teams ===
Location of teams in Segunda División B Gr. 4 2005–06

Group 4
| | Team | Founded in | Based in | Ground |
|---|---|---|---|---|
| 1 | Badajoz | 1905 | Badajoz, Extremadura | Nuevo Vivero |
| 2 | Algeciras | 1912 | Algeciras, Andalusia | Nuevo Mirador |
| 3 | Real Jaén | 1922 | Jaén, Andalusia | Nuevo La Victoria |
| 4 | Extremadura | 1924 | Almendralejo, Extremadura | Francisco de la Hera |
| 5 | Águilas | 1925 | Águilas, Murcia | El Rubial |
| 6 | Díter Zafra | 1930 | Zafra, Extremadura | Nuevo Estadio de Zafra |
| 7 | Alcalá | 1944 | Alcalá de Guadaira, Andalusia | Nuevo Ciudad de Alcalá |
| 8 | Conquense | 1946 | Cuenca, Castile La Mancha | La Fuensanta |
| 9 | Talavera | 1948 | Talavera de la Reina, Castile La Mancha | El Prado |
| 10 | Villanueva | 1951 | Villanueva de Córdoba, Andalusia | San Miguel |
| 11 | Córdoba | 1954 | Córdoba, Andalusia | Nuevo Arcángel |
| 12 | Sevilla B | 1958 | Sevilla, Andalusia | José Ramón Cisneros Palacios |
| 13 | Écija | 1968 | Ecija, Andalusia | San Pablo |
| 14 | Baza | 1970 | Baza, Andalusia | Constantino Navarro |
| 15 | Mérida | 1990 | Mérida, Extremadura | Romano |
| 16 | Linares | 1990 | Linares, Andalusia | Linarejos |
| 17 | Almansa | 1992 | Almansa, Castile La Mancha | Polideportivo Municipal Paco Simón |
| 18 | Cartagena | 1995 | Cartagena, Murcia | Cartagonova |
| 19 | Ceuta | 1996 | Ceuta, Ceuta | Alfonso Murube |
| 20 | Marbella | 1997 | Marbella, Andalusia | Municipal de Marbella |

=== League table ===
| Pos | Team | Pld | W | D | L | GF | GA | GD | Pts | Qualification or relegation |
|---|---|---|---|---|---|---|---|---|---|---|
| 1 | Cartagena | 38 | 21 | 10 | 7 | 54 | 33 | +21 | 73 | Qualification to promotion playoffs |
| 2 | Águilas | 38 | 18 | 11 | 9 | 46 | 30 | +16 | 65 | Qualification to promotion playoffs |
| 3 | Sevilla B | 38 | 15 | 15 | 8 | 48 | 30 | +18 | 60 | Qualification to promotion playoffs |
| 4 | Linares | 38 | 16 | 12 | 10 | 39 | 31 | +8 | 60 | Qualification to promotion playoffs |
| 5 | Écija | 38 | 15 | 11 | 12 | 46 | 34 | +12 | 56 | Qualification to Copa del Rey |
| 6 | Córdoba | 38 | 13 | 16 | 9 | 57 | 46 | +11 | 55 | Qualification to Copa del Rey |
| 7 | Badajoz | 38 | 15 | 9 | 14 | 36 | 34 | +2 | 54 | |
| 8 | Alcalá | 38 | 14 | 11 | 13 | 37 | 39 | −2 | 53 | |
| 9 | Mérida | 38 | 14 | 10 | 14 | 40 | 43 | −3 | 52 | |
| 10 | Ceuta | 38 | 10 | 22 | 6 | 43 | 31 | +12 | 52 | |
| 11 | Extremadura | 38 | 15 | 7 | 16 | 52 | 48 | +4 | 52 | |
| 12 | Marbella | 38 | 13 | 13 | 12 | 41 | 41 | 0 | 52 | |
| 13 | Real Jaén | 38 | 13 | 12 | 13 | 41 | 41 | 0 | 51 | |
| 14 | Talavera | 38 | 13 | 11 | 14 | 56 | 53 | +3 | 50 | |
| 15 | Villanueva | 38 | 12 | 10 | 16 | 45 | 61 | −16 | 46 | |
| 16 | Baza | 38 | 10 | 15 | 13 | 38 | 39 | −1 | 45 | Qualification to relegation playoffs |
| 17 | Almansa (R) | 38 | 10 | 13 | 15 | 35 | 43 | −8 | 43 | Relegation to Tercera División |
| 18 | Conquense (R) | 38 | 10 | 9 | 19 | 36 | 57 | −21 | 39 | Relegation to Tercera División |
| 19 | Algeciras (R) | 38 | 8 | 12 | 18 | 38 | 55 | −17 | 36 | Relegation to Tercera División |
| 20 | Díter Zafra (R) | 38 | 7 | 7 | 24 | 37 | 76 | −39 | 28 | Relegation to Tercera División |

Rules for classification: 1st points; 2nd head-to-head; 3rd goal difference; 4th goals scored
(R) Relegated

=== Results ===
| Home \ Away | AGU | ALC | ALG | ALM | BAD | BAZ | CAR | CEU | COQ | COR | DIT | ECI | EXT | JAE | LIN | MAR | MER | SEV | TAL | VNA |
|---|---|---|---|---|---|---|---|---|---|---|---|---|---|---|---|---|---|---|---|---|
| Águilas | — | 1–0 | 1–1 | 2–1 | 0–2 | 3–0 | 1–0 | 2–0 | 2–0 | 1–1 | 2–0 | 2–1 | 3–0 | 2–1 | 1–0 | 0–1 | 3–2 | 1–1 | 2–1 | 1–0 |
| Alcalá | 1–1 | — | 1–0 | 2–0 | 2–0 | 2–1 | 1–0 | 1–0 | 1–2 | 2–2 | 2–1 | 1–0 | 1–0 | 0–1 | 1–2 | 1–0 | 0–1 | 1–2 | 0–0 | 2–1 |
| Algeciras | 1–2 | 1–0 | — | 1–1 | 0–0 | 0–2 | 2–1 | 0–0 | 0–0 | 1–2 | 1–3 | 0–0 | 3–2 | 2–0 | 2–2 | 0–2 | 2–1 | 0–2 | 1–2 | 2–3 |
| Almansa | 0–0 | | 0–2 | — | 1–0 | 1–1 | 0–1 | 1–1 | 1–0 | 2–2 | 3–1 | 4–0 | 0–2 | 2–1 | 0–1 | 0–1 | 2–2 | 0–2 | 2–1 | 2–0 |
| Badajoz | 1–0 | 1–3 | 1–3 | 1–0 | — | 0–1 | 0–2 | 1–1 | 0–1 | 0–0 | 1–0 | 0–1 | 2–0 | 3–1 | 2–1 | 1–0 | 0–1 | 1–1 | 2–1 | 0–0 |
| Baza | 0–1 | 1–0 | 2–0 | 0–0 | 0–1 | — | 2–1 | 1–1 | 6–0 | 1–1 | 4–1 | 2–1 | 3–2 | 0–3 | 0–1 | 0–0 | 2–0 | 0–0 | 1–2 | 0–0 |
| Cartagena | 2–1 | 1–1 | 3–1 | 2–1 | 1–0 | 2–1 | — | 1–1 | 1–1 | 2–1 | 3–0 | 1–0 | 2–0 | 2–0 | 1–0 | 2–0 | 2–0 | 2–2 | 3–3 | 1–0 |
| Ceuta | 0–0 | 0–0 | 0–0 | 1–1 | 0–1 | 2–1 | 0–0 | — | 2–0 | 1–1 | 4–0 | 3–4 | 0–0 | 2–1 | 1–1 | 2–0 | 1–2 | 0–0 | 1–1 | 2–0 |
| Conquense | 2–0 | 2–2 | 2–1 | 1–1 | 1–2 | 0–0 | 0–0 | 0–4 | — | 1–4 | 1–1 | 0–1 | 3–5 | 2–3 | 2–0 | 3–0 | 1–2 | 0–2 | 3–2 | 2–1 |
| Córdoba | 1–0 | 1–0 | 1–1 | 4–0 | 3–1 | 1–1 | 1–2 | 2–2 | 2–0 | — | 3–1 | 2–4 | 0–4 | 1–0 | 0–2 | 1–3 | 0–1 | 1–1 | 2–3 | 0–0 |
| Díter Zafra | 3–2 | 1–1 | 2–2 | 0–0 | 0–4 | 1–1 | 1–3 | 0–1 | 1–2 | 0–5 | — | 2–3 | 1–5 | 1–0 | 1–0 | 0–3 | 1–2 | 2–2 | 0–2 | 3–0 |
| Écija | 1–1 | 1–0 | 2–1 | 1–1 | 0–1 | 4–0 | 0–0 | 0–0 | 2–0 | 0–0 | 4–1 | — | 2–0 | 0–0 | 1–0 | 0–2 | 1–1 | 2–1 | 1–2 | 0–0 |
| Extremadura | 1–1 | 1–2 | 2–1 | 1–0 | 2–0 | 2–2 | 2–3 | 1–2 | 1–0 | 0–0 | 2–1 | 1–0 | — | 0–0 | 0–0 | 1–2 | 0–1 | 0–1 | 3–2 | 4–0 |
| Real Jaén | 1–1 | 3–0 | 2–1 | 2–0 | 1–1 | 0–0 | 3–1 | 0–0 | 1–0 | 0–0 | 2–1 | 0–4 | 3–0 | — | 0–0 | 2–2 | 1–4 | 1–0 | 1–0 | 3–0 |
| Linares | 1–1 | 0–0 | 2–0 | 0–2 | 1–1 | 1–0 | 2–0 | 2–2 | 0–2 | 1–1 | 1–0 | 1–0 | 2–1 | 2–1 | — | 2–0 | 2–0 | 1–0 | 1–0 | 3–1 |
| Marbella | 1–1 | 1–2 | 1–1 | 0–1 | 1–1 | 1–0 | 0–0 | 1–1 | 1–1 | 1–3 | 1–0 | 1–1 | 0–1 | 0–0 | 3–1 | — | 1–2 | 1–1 | 1–0 | 2–1 |
| Mérida | 1–0 | 1–1 | 1–2 | 0–0 | 0–0 | 2–0 | 0–0 | 0–0 | 3–1 | 1–1 | 0–3 | 2–1 | 1–2 | 3–0 | 1–1 | 0–1 | — | 0–2 | 0–0 | 0–1 |
| Sevilla B | 0–1 | 0–0 | 1–1 | 3–0 | 1–0 | 0–0 | 1–2 | 1–2 | 1–0 | 1–2 | 2–0 | 0–0 | 2–1 | 0–0 | 2–1 | 1–1 | 3–0 | — | 4–1 | 1–1 |
| Talavera | 1–0 | 3–0 | 4–0 | 3–1 | 1–3 | 1–1 | 1–2 | 2–2 | 0–0 | 3–2 | 0–1 | 0–3 | 0–0 | 1–1 | 0–0 | 3–3 | 4–2 | 1–2 | — | 2–1 |
| Villanueva | 0–3 | 3–3 | 2–1 | 1–1 | 2–1 | 1–1 | 3–2 | 2–1 | 1–0 | 2–3 | 2–2 | 1–0 | 2–3 | 3–2 | 1–1 | 4–2 | 1–0 | 3–2 | 1–3 | — |

Source: BDFutbol
Legend: Blue = home team win; Yellow = draw; Red = away team win.

=== Top goalscorers ===
| Goalscorers | Team | Goals |
|---|---|---|
| (Spain) Asen | CF Extremadura | 21 |
| (Spain) Edu Espada | Talavera CF | 20 |
| (Spain) Javi Moreno | Córdoba CF | 18 |
| (Spain) Sabino Sánchez | FC Cartagena | 17 |
| (Spain) Puli | Écija Balompié | 16 |

=== Top goalkeepers ===
| Goalkeeper | Team | Goals | Matches | Average |
|---|---|---|---|---|
| (Spain) Javi Varas | Sevillla B | 17 | 27 | 0,63 |
| (Spain) Óscar Benito | CD Linares | 26 | 36 | 0,72 |
| (Spain) Garikoitz Basauri | AD Ceuta | 25 | 32 | 0,78 |
| (Spain) Félix Campo | CD Baza | 36 | 37 | 0,97 |
| (Spain) José María Galisteo | UD Almansa | 36 | 35 | 1,03 |
