= Segunda División B play-offs =

Spanish football league play-offs

The Primera Federación promotion play-offs are a series of playoff matches contested by the teams finishing from 2nd to 5th in each Primera Federación group. Eight teams play to take two promotion places.

Barakaldo CF has been in the Segunda División B promotion play-offs a record nine times: 1993–1994, 1997–2000, 2002–2003 and 2008, but never won promotion. Otherwise Racing de Ferrol, FC Barcelona B, Getafe CF and Real Murcia won promotion a record three times.

During the Segunda División B era, teams from group 1 (usually from west) and group 4 (usually from south) won promotion twenty-five times each. Group 3 (usually from the east) contributed with twenty-three promotion teams and group 2 (usually from the north) only twelve.

== Format ==
2008–09 to 2020–21 season:
Champions of four Segunda División B groups play each other to take two promotion places. At same time, 2nd play 4th and 3rd play each other at first round. The second round is played with six winners of the first round and two losing champions. The final round is played with four winners of the second round to take the other two promotion places.

2021–22 season:
In the Primera División RFEF, teams ranked second through fifth in each of the two groups qualified for the promotion play-off, where the last two promotion spots were determined. Three cities hosted the finals including A Coruña, Ferrol and Vigo.

since 2022–23 season:
In the Primera Federación, the same format was retained, with teams ranked second to fifth in each group competing for two promotion spots, but a two-leg system was introduced.

== Promoted teams ==
Below is a list of promoted teams through the play-offs:

Year	Promoted teams
Segunda División B
1991	Real Madrid B, Racing Santander, Compostela, Mérida
1992	Badajoz, Villarreal, Lugo, Marbella
1993	Toledo, Leganés, Hércules, Murcia
1994	Getafe, Salamanca, Ourense, CF Extremadura
1995	Sestao Sport, Almería CF, Alavés, Écija
1996	Levante, Las Palmas, Ourense, Atlético Madrid B
1997	Elche, Xerez, Jaén, Numancia
1998	Málaga, Mallorca B, Barcelona B, Recreativo Huelva
1999	Elche, Getafe, Levante, Córdoba
2000	Universidad LP, Jaén, Racing Ferrol, Murcia
2001	Burgos, Poli Ejido, Gimnàstic, Xerez
2002	Terrassa, Compostela, Getafe, UD Almería
2003	Cádiz, Algeciras, Málaga B, Ciudad Murcia
2004	Lleida, Pontevedra, Racing Ferrol, Gimnàstic
2005	Hércules, Castellón, Lorca Deportiva, Real Madrid B
2006	Salamanca, Las Palmas, Vecindario, Ponferradina
2007	Sevilla Atlético, Córdoba, Racing Ferrol, Eibar
2008	Rayo Vallecano, Alicante, Huesca, Girona
2009	Cartagena, Cádiz, Villarreal B, Real Unión
2010	Granada, Ponferradina, Barcelona B, Alcorcón
2011	Sabadell, Murcia, Guadalajara, Alcoyano
2012	Mirandés, Real Madrid Castilla, Ponferradina, Lugo
2013	Alavés, Tenerife, Eibar, Jaén
2014	Racing Santander, Albacete, Llagostera, Leganés
2015	Gimnàstic, Oviedo, Bilbao Athletic, Huesca
2016	Reus, UCAM Murcia, Cádiz, Sevilla Atlético
2017	Cultural Leonesa, Lorca FC, Albacete, Barcelona B
2018	Mallorca, Rayo Majadahonda, Elche, Extremadura UD
2019	Racing Santander, Fuenlabrada, Ponferradina, Mirandés
2020	Cartagena, UD Logroñés, Castellón, Sabadell
2021	Real Sociedad B, Amorebieta, UD Ibiza, Burgos
Primera División RFEF
2022	Albacete, Villarreal B
Primera Federación
2023	Alcorcón, Eldense
2024	Málaga, Córdoba
2025	Andorra, Real Sociedad B
