= 2008–09 Segunda División B =

Segunda División B
- Season: 2008–09
- Champions: Cádiz
- Promoted: Cádiz; Cartagena; Real Unión; Villarreal B

The 2008–09 Segunda División B season was the 32nd since its establishment. The first matches of the season were played on 30 August 2008, and the season ended on 21 June 2009 with the promotion play-off finals.

== Group 1 ==
- Teams from Asturias, Basque Country, Cantabria, Castile and León and Galicia.

=== Summary before 2008–09 season ===
- Scores and Classification - Group 1
- Playoffs de Ascenso:
  - SD Ponferradina - Eliminated in Second Round
  - SD Huesca - Promoted to Segunda División
  - Zamora CF - Eliminated in Second Round
  - Barakaldo CF - Eliminated in First Round

- Promoted to this group from Tercera División:
  - Racing Santander B - Founded in: 1926//, Based in: Santander, Cantabria//, Promoted From: Group 3
  - Sporting de Gijón B - Founded in: 1967//, Based in: Gijón, Asturias//, Promoted From: Group 2

- Relegated to this group from Segunda División:
  - Racing de Ferrol - Founded in: 1919//, Based in: Ferrol, Galicia//, Relegated From: Segunda División

- Relegated to Tercera División:
  - Logroñés CF - Founded in: 2000//, Based in: Logroño, La Rioja//, Relegated to: Group 16
  - Burgos - Founded in: 1994//, Based in: Burgos, Castile and León//, Relegated to: Group 8
  - Palencia - Founded in: 1975//, Based in: Palencia, Castile and León//, Relegated to: Group 8
  - Peña Sport - Founded in: 1925//, Based in: Tafalla, Navarre//, Relegated to: Group 15

=== Teams ===
Location of teams in Segunda División B Gr. 1 2008–09

Group 1
	Team	Founded in	Based in	Ground
1	Real Unión	1915	Irún, Basque Country	Stadium Gal
2	Barakaldo	1917	Barakaldo, Basque Country	Lasesarre
3	Racing de Ferrol	1919	Ferrol, Galicia	A Malata
4	Ponferradina	1922	Ponferrada, Castile and León	El Toralín
5	C. Leonesa	1923	León, Castile and León	Reino de León
6	Lemona	1923	Lemoa, Basque Country	Arlonagusia
7	Racing B	1926	Santander, Cantabria	La Albericia
8	Marino	1931	Luanco, Asturias	Miramar
9	Pontevedra	1941	Pontevedra, Galicia	Pasarón
10	Valladolid B	1944	Valladolid, Castile and León	Ciudad Deportiva del Real Valladolid
11	Real Sociedad B	1951	San Sebastián, Basque Country	Zubieta
12	Lugo	1953	Lugo, Galicia	Anxo Carro
13	Deportivo B	1964	A Coruña, Galicia	Abegondo
14	Bilbao Athletic	1964	Bilbao, Basque Country	Lezama
15	Sporting de Gijón B	1967	Gijón, Asturias	Mareo
16	Zamora	1969	Zamora, Castile and León	Ruta de la Plata
17	Guijuelo	1974	Guijuelo, Castile and León	Municipal de Guijuelo
18	Ciudad Santiago	1978	Santiago de Compostela, Galicia	San Lázaro
19	Celta B	1988	Vigo, Galicia	Barreiro
20	Sestao	1996	Sestao, Basque Country	Las Llanas

=== League table ===
Pos	Team	Pld	W	D	L	GF	GA	GD	Pts	Qualification or relegation
1	Real Unión (C, O)	38	21	12	5	57	25	+32	75	Qualification to group champions' playoffs
2	Cultural Leonesa	38	20	10	8	45	23	+22	70	Qualification to promotion playoffs
3	Ponferradina	38	18	9	11	54	41	+13	63	Qualification to promotion playoffs
4	Zamora	38	17	10	11	47	34	+13	61	Qualification to promotion playoffs
5	Celta B	38	15	13	10	42	26	+16	58	
6	Lemona	38	16	10	12	31	31	0	58	Qualification to Copa del Rey
7	Racing Ferrol	38	16	8	14	43	44	−1	56	
8	Lugo	38	15	10	13	57	48	+9	55	
9	Guijuelo	38	14	11	13	45	36	+9	53	
10	Barakaldo	38	15	8	15	35	39	−4	53	
11	Bilbao Athletic	38	14	10	14	48	43	+5	52	
12	Pontevedra	38	14	9	15	50	49	+1	51	
13	Ciudad Santiago (R)	38	13	11	14	42	42	0	50 (Note: SD Ciudad de Santiago was relegated to Tercera División for not paying its players.)	
14	Racing Santander B	38	12	11	15	38	47	−9	47	
15	Sestao River	38	10	16	12	37	41	−4	46	
16	Sporting de Gijón B	38	13	6	19	46	55	−9	45	Qualification to relegation playoffs
17	Deportivo B (R)	38	9	12	17	40	53	−13	39	Relegation to Tercera División
18	Real Sociedad B (R)	38	9	12	17	29	43	−14	38 (Note: Real Sociedad B was docked 1 point due to an illegal lineup.)	Relegation to Tercera División
19	Valladolid B (R)	38	10	6	22	32	61	−29	36	Relegation to Tercera División
20	Marino (R)	38	9	6	23	22	58	−36	33	Relegation to Tercera División

Rules for classification: 1st points; 2nd head-to-head; 3rd goal difference; 4th goals scored.
(C) Champions; (O) Promoted through playoff; (R) Relegated

=== Results ===
Home \ Away	BAR	BAT	CEL	CSA	CDL	DEP	GUJ	LEM	LUG	MAR	PNF	PON	RFE	RAC	RSO	RUN	SRC	SPG	VAL	ZAM
Barakaldo	—	1–5	0–4	2–1	1–0	1–1	0–0	0–0	2–0	0–3	1–2	1–1	1–0	2–1	2–0	1–0	2–0	2–0	4–1	1–1
Bilbao Ath.	3–1	—	0–3	3–2	3–1	1–1	1–0	1–0	0–0	0–0	2–0	0–3	4–1	1–4	0–1	1–2	0–0	1–0	0–1	1–1
Celta B	0–1	1–1	—	1–0	0–1	2–0	2–1	2–1	0–0	0–1	0–1	1–0	0–0	4–0	2–0	1–2	1–1	1–2	2–1	1–0
Ciudad Santiago	0–1	1–0	0–1	—	1–0	1–1	1–1	1–0	2–2	2–0	1–2	2–2	1–0	2–1	1–3	1–1	1–0	4–4	3–1	0–2
Cultural Leonesa	2–0	1–1	0–3	1–0	—	2–0	2–0	3–0	3–2	1–0	1–0	2–0	0–0	6–1	2–0	0–2	1–0	1–0	1–0	1–0
Deportivo B	1–0	3–4	1–1	1–1	1–1	—	0–2	0–1	2–3	1–0	2–0	0–1	3–0	0–0	0–0	0–2	0–1	3–2	2–1	2–2
Guijuelo	3–1	1–0	0–0	2–0	0–0	0–3	—	1–1	0–0	5–0	0–1	3–1	1–0	0–0	3–1	4–0	2–0	4–3	1–1	2–1
Lemona	0–0	0–0	1–0	1–0	0–0	2–1	1–0	—	1–1	2–1	2–0	2–0	1–0	1–0	0–0	0–3	2–2	1–0	2–0	1–0
Lugo	1–0	2–1	3–1	0–1	1–4	2–1	0–1	1–0	—	4–0	2–4	2–1	1–1	4–0	3–0	0–3	4–0	2–2	2–1	0–1
Marino Luanco	1–0	1–0	0–1	1–0	0–2	1–1	2–1	0–0	0–5	—	0–1	0–1	3–2	1–1	0–0	0–3	1–0	0–3	2–0	1–2
Ponferradina	0–0	0–1	1–1	1–1	0–0	2–0	2–0	1–2	3–3	1–0	—	5–1	2–0	1–0	1–0	0–0	1–1	4–1	3–1	2–0
Pontevedra	1–0	3–1	1–1	0–4	2–2	1–1	3–0	0–0	1–1	4–1	3–0	—	2–3	2–1	2–1	1–0	1–1	3–1	3–0	1–2
Racing Ferrol	2–0	0–2	2–2	1–2	2–1	2–1	2–1	3–0	2–0	1–0	2–0	1–0	—	0–1	2–4	1–1	2–1	1–0	1–0	0–0
Racing B	1–0	0–2	0–0	1–0	0–0	3–1	1–3	0–1	1–0	2–0	1–1	0–0	3–0	—	4–2	0–1	3–2	2–1	1–2	2–1
R. Sociedad B	0–2	2–1	1–1	1–1	0–0	1–1	1–0	2–1	0–1	1–0	1–3	1–0	0–1	0–0	—	2–2	0–0	2–0	1–1	0–1
Real Unión	0–1	1–1	0–1	1–1	2–1	4–1	1–1	3–1	1–1	5–0	0–0	1–0	2–0	2–0	1–0	—	1–1	2–1	1–0	2–1
Sestao River	0–0	0–3	0–0	1–2	0–0	2–0	1–1	1–0	3–0	2–1	4–2	2–1	1–1	1–1	1–0	1–1	—	1–2	1–1	0–0
Sporting B	1–3	1–0	1–0	0–1	1–0	1–2	0–0	1–0	2–1	0–0	2–1	0–3	2–5	1–1	1–0	0–1	2–0	—	3–0	1–1
Valladolid B	1–0	2–1	1–0	0–0	0–1	0–2	2–0	2–1	1–2	2–1	1–4	3–1	0–0	1–0	1–1	0–3	1–4	1–4	—	0–1
Zamora	2–1	2–2	1–1	2–0	0–1	3–0	2–1	1–2	2–1	2–0	4–2	3–0	1–2	1–1	1–0	0–0	0–1	1–0	2–1	—

Source: BDFutbol
Legend: Blue = home team win; Yellow = draw; Red = away team win.

=== Top goalscorers ===
Last updated 10 May 2009

Goalscorers	Goals	Team
(Spain) Javi Ballesteros	19	Guijuelo
(Spain) Óscar de Paula	16	Ponferradina
(Portugal) Marco Paixão	13	Cultural Leonesa
(Germany) Maikel	12	Ciudad Santiago
(Spain) Iñaki Goikoetxea	12	Real Unión

=== Top goalkeepers ===
Last updated 10 May 2009

Goalkeeper	Goals	Matches	Average	Team
(Spain) José Bermúdez	18	33	0.55	Cultural Leonesa
(Spain) Joel Rodríguez	24	36	0.67	Celta B
(Spain) Igor Etxebarrieta	21	30	0.7	Lemona
(Spain) Daniel Giménez	34	38	0.89	Zamora
(Spain) Miguel Escalona	34	34	1	Guijuelo

== Group 2 ==
- Teams from Canary Islands, Community of Madrid, Region of Murcia, Extremadura and La Rioja.

=== Summary before 2008–09 season ===
- Scores and Classification - Group 2
- Playoffs de Ascenso:
  - Rayo Vallecano - Promoted to Segunda División
  - Pontevedra CF - Eliminated in First Round
  - UD Fuerteventura - Eliminated in First Round
  - Deportivo B - Eliminated in First Round

- Promoted to this group from Tercera División:
  - CDA Navalcarnero - Founded in: 1961//, Based in: Navalcarnero, Community of Madrid//, Promoted From: Group 7
  - Las Palmas Atlético - Founded in: 1941//, Based in: Las Palmas de Gran Canaria, Canary Islands//, Promoted From: Group 12
  - Sangonera Atlético - Founded in: 1996//, Based in: Sangonera la Verde, Region of Murcia//, Promoted From: Group 13
  - Real Murcia Imperial - Founded in: 1924//, Based in: Murcia, Region of Murcia//, Promoted From: Group 13
  - Atlético Ciudad - Founded in: 2007//, Based in: Lorquí, Region of Murcia//, Promoted From: Group 13
  - Alfaro - Founded in: 1922//, Based in: Alfaro, La Rioja//, Promoted From: Group 16

- Relegated to this group from Segunda División:
  - None

- Relegated to Tercera División:
  - CD Ourense - Founded in: 1952//, Based in: Ourense, Galicia//, Relegated to: Group 1
  - Fuenlabrada - Founded in: 1975//, Based in: Fuenlabrada, Community of Madrid//, Relegated to: Group 7
  - S.S. Reyes - Founded in: 1971//, Based in: San Sebastián de los Reyes, Community of Madrid//, Relegated to: Group 7
  - San Isidro - Founded in: 1970//, Based in: San Isidro, Canary Islands//, Relegated to: Group 12
  - Logroñés - Founded in: 1940//, Based in: Logroño, La Rioja//, Relegated to: Group 16

=== Teams ===
Location of teams in Segunda División B Gr. 2 2008–09
Canary Islands

Group 2
	Team	Founded in	Based in	Ground
1	Alfaro	1922	Alfaro, La Rioja	La Molineta
2	Real Murcia Imperial	1924	Murcia, Region of Murcia	Nueva Condomina
3	Águilas	1925	Águilas, Region of Murcia	El Rubial
4	Leganés	1928	Leganés, Community of Madrid	Butarque
5	Castilla	1930	Madrid, Community of Madrid	Alfredo di Stéfano
6	Las Palmas Atlético	1941	Las Palmas, Canary Islands	Pepe Gonçalves
7	Vecindario	1942	Vecindario, Canary Islands	Municipal de Vecindario
8	Navalcarnero	1961	Navalcarnero, Community of Madrid	Mariano González
9	Atlético B	1970	Madrid, Community of Madrid	Cerro del Espino
10	Lanzarote	1970	Lanzarote, Canary Islands	Ciudad Deportiva de Lanzarote
11	Alcorcón	1971	Alcorcón, Madrid	Santo Domingo
12	Mérida	1990	Mérida, Extremadura	Romano
13	Universidad L.P.	1994	Las Palmas, Canary Islands	Pepe Gonçalves
14	Cartagena	1995	Cartagena, Region of Murcia	Cartagonova
15	Pájara Playas	1996	Pájara, Canary Islands	Alfonso Silva
16	Sangonera	1996	Sangonera la Verde, Region of Murcia	El Mayayo
17	Lorca	2002	Lorca, Region of Murcia	Francisco Artés Carrasco
18	Fuerteventura	2004	Puerto del Rosario, Canary Islands	Los Pozos
19	V.S. Brígida	2004	Santa Brígida, Canary Islands	Los Olivos
20	Atlético Ciudad	2007	Alcantarilla, Region of Murcia; Totana, Region of Murcia	Ángel Sornichero; Juan Cayuela

=== League table ===
Pos	Team	Pld	W	D	L	GF	GA	GD	Pts	Qualification or relegation
1	Cartagena (C, O)	38	20	13	5	60	28	+32	73	Qualification to group champions' playoffs
2	Lorca Deportiva (R)	38	20	9	9	58	34	+24	69	Qualification to promotion playoffs (Note: Lorca Deportiva CF was relegated to Tercera División for not paying its players.)
3	Alcorcón	38	16	18	4	61	34	+27	66	Qualification to promotion playoffs
4	Leganés	38	18	12	8	51	37	+14	66	Qualification to promotion playoffs
5	Real Murcia B	38	18	11	9	41	32	+9	65	
6	RM Castilla	38	18	9	11	60	45	+15	63	
7	Mérida (R)	38	17	11	10	50	34	+16	62 (Note: Mérida UD was relegated to Tercera División for not paying its players.)	
8	Atlético Ciudad	38	16	14	8	39	27	+12	62	Qualification to Copa del Rey
9	Sangonera	38	13	17	8	46	37	+9	56	
10	Águilas	38	15	10	13	43	44	−1	55	
11	Vecindario	38	14	10	14	36	39	−3	52	
12	Universidad LPGC	38	12	12	14	32	45	−13	48	
13	Atlético B	38	12	11	15	43	44	−1	47	
14	Lanzarote	38	10	10	18	40	57	−17	40	
15	Fuerteventura (R)	38	11	6	21	45	66	−21	39	Relegation to Tercera División (Note: UD Fuerteventura was relegated to Tercera División for not paying its players.)
16	Las Palmas Atlético (R)	38	10	8	20	38	54	−16	38	Qualification to relegation playoffs
17	Navalcarnero (R)	38	10	7	21	37	55	−18	37	Relegation to Tercera División
18	Pájara PJ (R)	38	8	11	19	38	55	−17	35	Relegation to Tercera División
19	Alfaro (R)	38	8	8	22	31	55	−24	32	Relegation to Tercera División
20	Villa Sta. Brígida (R)	38	5	11	22	33	60	−27	26	Relegation to Tercera División

Rules for classification: 1st points; 2nd head-to-head; 3rd goal difference; 4th goals scored.
(C) Champions; (O) Promoted through playoff; (R) Relegated

=== Results ===
Home \ Away	ÁGU	ALC	ALF	CIU	ATM	CAR	FUE	LAN	LPA	LEG	LOR	MÉR	NAV	PPJ	RMC	RMB	SAN	ULP	VEC	VSB
Águilas	—	1–1	2–3	0–0	2–0	0–2	0–2	2–4	3–1	0–0	1–1	1–0	2–1	1–0	1–1	0–0	1–1	1–0	1–0	4–0
Alcorcón	2–0	—	1–0	0–0	1–1	3–2	5–1	2–1	3–0	1–3	2–5	2–0	1–0	5–1	1–1	1–1	1–1	1–1	3–2	4–1
Alfaro	1–1	0–0	—	1–0	0–1	0–0	2–0	2–0	1–1	1–1	1–3	1–1	0–2	0–1	2–3	0–3	1–2	3–1	0–2	1–1
Atlético Ciudad	1–1	1–0	0–1	—	2–0	0–2	2–1	4–1	2–1	1–1	2–1	0–1	1–1	2–0	5–0	2–1	0–0	0–0	2–0	2–1
Atlético B	2–1	1–1	2–1	1–2	—	1–2	0–0	6–0	2–1	0–0	2–3	4–0	1–0	0–1	0–0	1–1	0–4	0–2	2–0	3–0
Cartagena	3–0	1–1	1–0	1–1	1–0	—	3–1	1–1	1–0	3–1	0–1	2–2	1–1	1–0	1–0	2–0	1–0	4–0	1–1	5–1
Fuerteventura	0–1	1–1	1–0	0–2	1–2	0–2	—	1–2	1–0	2–2	1–2	2–0	1–1	4–2	2–3	1–2	4–4	2–0	1–2	2–1
Lanzarote	0–1	0–0	4–0	0–1	1–1	1–4	4–1	—	1–0	0–0	0–1	1–3	0–2	4–3	1–3	3–1	2–2	0–0	1–2	1–0
Las Palmas At.	1–3	0–2	3–1	0–0	4–1	2–3	1–2	2–0	—	1–0	1–0	0–2	3–0	1–1	1–0	0–1	1–1	2–0	0–2	1–0
Leganés	3–0	0–6	2–1	3–0	2–1	2–1	2–0	0–0	1–1	—	3–0	1–2	3–0	2–0	1–2	3–0	0–0	3–0	1–0	2–0
Lorca Deportiva	0–2	1–1	2–0	2–0	1–0	1–1	1–0	2–0	3–0	0–1	—	0–0	4–0	4–0	0–3	1–2	2–1	1–1	3–1	1–0
Mérida	1–0	1–1	2–0	0–0	1–1	1–1	4–0	1–1	3–0	6–0	2–2	—	1–0	1–0	0–0	1–2	0–1	3–0	1–0	2–1
Navalcarnero	0–1	1–2	1–3	1–2	1–2	1–0	2–1	2–1	2–2	1–2	0–1	2–0	—	2–3	4–1	1–0	0–0	0–0	0–2	1–0
Pájara PJ	3–1	1–1	4–1	0–1	1–1	0–2	1–3	0–1	0–1	0–0	0–0	2–3	1–1	—	4–1	2–0	3–0	0–0	1–1	1–1
RM Castilla	4–1	0–1	2–0	0–0	1–1	0–1	4–0	0–1	4–2	3–2	0–2	2–0	2–1	2–0	—	2–2	2–2	5–1	2–0	1–0
Real Murcia B	1–2	1–0	1–0	0–0	2–0	0–0	0–0	2–0	2–2	2–0	2–1	0–0	1–0	0–0	2–1	—	1–0	1–0	3–0	2–1
Sangonera	2–1	3–3	1–0	0–0	0–0	2–1	3–1	1–1	1–0	1–1	0–0	1–0	1–3	2–0	1–2	3–1	—	2–0	0–0	2–1
Universidad LPGC	0–2	0–0	0–0	2–0	3–1	0–0	2–1	1–0	3–1	0–0	0–3	2–0	4–2	1–0	2–1	0–1	1–0	—	1–1	2–1
Vecindario	1–0	0–1	2–1	0–0	1–0	2–2	0–1	2–1	2–1	1–2	2–1	0–2	2–0	0–0	0–2	0–0	2–1	1–1	—	2–0
V. Sta. Brígida	2–2	0–0	1–2	3–1	0–2	1–1	1–3	1–1	0–0	0–1	2–2	1–3	3–0	4–2	0–0	2–0	0–0	2–1	0–0	—

Source: BDFutbol
Legend: Blue = home team win; Yellow = draw; Red = away team win.

=== Top goalscorers ===
Last updated 10 May 2009

Goalscorers	Goals	Team
(Spain) Sabino Sánchez	18	Mérida
(Spain) Manuel Busto	16	Lorca Deportiva
(Spain) Alberto Bueno	16	RM Castilla
(Hungary) Ádám Szalai	16	RM Castilla
(Spain) Néstor Susaeta	14	Alcorcón

=== Top goalkeepers ===
Last updated 10 May 2009

Goalkeeper	Goals	Matches	Average	Team
(Spain) Miguel Zapata	17	28	0.61	Atlético Ciudad
(Spain) Rubén Martínez	24	32	0.75	Cartagena
(Spain) Orlando Quintana	29	34	0.85	Lorca Deportiva
(Spain) Álvaro Campos	24	28	0.86	Real Murcia B
(Argentina) Matías Garavano	26	30	0.87	Mérida

== Group 3 ==
- Teams from Balearic Islands, Catalonia, Valencian Community, and Navarre.

=== Summary before 2008–09 season ===
- Scores and Classification - Group 3
- Playoffs de Ascenso:
  - Girona FC - Promoted to Segunda División
  - Alicante CF - Promoted to Segunda División
  - CF Gavà - Eliminated in First Round
  - Benidorm CD - Eliminated in First Round

- Promoted to this group from Tercera División:
  - Atlético Baleares - Founded in: 1920//, Based in: Palma de Mallorca, Balearic Islands//, Promoted From: Group 11
  - Valencia Mestalla - Founded in: 1944//, Based in: Paterna, Valencian Community//, Promoted From: Group 6
  - Barcelona Atlètic - Founded in: 1970//, Based in: Barcelona, Catalonia//, Promoted From: Group 5
  - Alzira - Founded in: 1946//, Based in: Alzira, Valencian Community//, Promoted From: Group 6
  - Sant Andreu - Founded in: 1909//, Based in: Barcelona, Catalonia//, Promoted From: Group 5
  - Santa Eulàlia - Founded in: 1949//, Based in: Santa Eulària des Riu, Balearic Islands//, Promoted From: Group 11

- Relegated to this group from Segunda División:
  - None

- Relegated to Tercera División:
  - Villajoyosa - Founded in: 1944//, Based in: Villajoyosa/La Vila Joiosa, Valencian Community//, Relegated to: Group 6
  - MiApuesta Castelldefels - Founded in: 1919//, Based in: Castelldefels, Catalonia//, Relegated to: Group 5
  - Espanyol B - Founded in: 1991//, Based in: Barcelona, Catalonia//, Relegated to: Group 5
  - CE L'Hospitalet - Founded in: 1957//, Based in: L'Hospitalet de Llobregat, Catalonia//, Relegated to: Group 5
  - Levante B - Founded in: 1961//, Based in: Valencia, Valencian Community//, Relegated to: Group 6

=== Teams ===
Location of teams in Segunda División B Gr. 3 2008–09

Group 3
	Team	Founded in	Based in	Ground
1	Badalona	1903	Badalona, Catalonia	Camp del Centenari
2	Sabadell	1903	Sabadell, Catalonia	Nova Creu Alta
3	Terrassa	1906	Terrassa, Catalonia	Olímpic de Terrassa
4	Sant Andreu	1907	Barcelona, Catalonia	Narcís Sala
5	Gavà	1922	Gavà, Catalonia	La Bòbila
6	Dénia	1927	Dénia, Valencian Community	Camp Nou de Dènia
7	Alcoyano	1929	Alcoyano, Valencian Community	El Collao
8	Santa Eulàlia	1949	Santa Eulària des Riu, Balearic Islands	Municipal de Santa Eulària
9	Lleida	1938	Lleida, Catalonia	Camp d'Esports
10	Atlético Baleares	1920	Palma de Mallorca, Balearic Islands	Balear
11	Valencia Mestalla	1944	Paterna, Valencian Community	Ciudad Deportiva de Paterna
12	Gramenet	1945	Santa Coloma de Gramenet, Catalonia	Nou Municipal
13	Alzira	1946	Alzira, Valencian Community	Luis Suñer Picó
14	Ontinyent	1947	Ontinyent, Valencian Community	El Clariano
15	Osasuna B	1964	Pamplona, Navarre	Tajonar
16	Benidorm	1964	Benidorm, Valencian Community	Foietes
17	Barcelona Atlètic	1970	Barcelona, Catalonia	Mini Estadi
18	Orihuela	1993	Orihuela, Valencian Community	Los Arcos
19	Eivissa	1995	Ibiza Town, Balearic Islands	Can Misses
20	Villarreal B	1999	Villarreal/Vila-real, Valencian Community	Ciudad Deportiva Villarreal CF

=== League table ===
Pos	Team	Pld	W	D	L	GF	GA	GD	Pts	Qualification or relegation
1	Alcoyano (C)	38	22	7	9	61	37	+24	73	Qualification to group champions' playoffs
2	Villarreal B (O)	38	22	6	10	73	41	+32	72	Qualification to promotion playoffs
3	Sant Andreu	38	15	17	6	45	34	+11	62	Qualification to promotion playoffs
4	Sabadell	38	16	13	9	53	44	+9	61	Qualification to promotion playoffs
5	Barcelona Atlètic	38	15	15	8	50	38	+12	60	
6	Gramenet	38	15	12	11	52	47	+5	57	Qualification to Copa del Rey
7	Ontinyent	38	14	14	10	44	34	+10	56	Qualification to Copa del Rey
8	Lleida	38	14	14	10	45	38	+7	56	
9	Badalona	38	14	12	12	45	41	+4	54	
10	Gavà	38	13	12	13	42	43	−1	51	
11	Orihuela	38	14	7	17	47	54	−7	49	
12	Valencia Mestalla	38	12	12	14	55	51	+4	48	
13	Osasuna B	38	11	15	12	48	53	−5	48	
14	Benidorm	38	10	15	13	37	36	+1	45	
15	Dénia	38	10	15	13	34	40	−6	45	
16	Terrassa	38	12	6	20	42	64	−22	42	Qualification to relegation playoffs
17	Alzira (R)	38	9	14	15	34	44	−10	41	Relegation to Tercera División
18	Eivissa (R)	38	7	14	17	46	64	−18	35 (Note: Eivissa was relegated to Regional de Ibiza y Formentera for not paying its players.)	Relegation to Tercera División
19	Santa Eulàlia (R)	38	9	7	22	35	55	−20	34	Relegation to Tercera División
20	Atlético Baleares (R)	38	8	9	21	24	54	−30	33	Relegation to Tercera División

Rules for classification: 1st points; 2nd head-to-head; 3rd goal difference; 4th goals scored.
(C) Champions; (O) Promoted through playoff; (R) Relegated

=== Results ===
Home \ Away	ALC	ALZ	BAL	BAD	BAR	BEN	DEN	EIV	GAV	GRA	LLE	ONT	ORI	OSA	SAB	SAN	SEU	TER	VME	VIL
Alcoyano	—	2–1	3–1	2–0	0–2	2–0	2–0	4–0	1–0	5–2	1–0	2–0	4–1	2–2	2–0	0–0	2–1	2–1	1–3	1–0
Alzira	1–2	—	2–1	2–1	1–1	1–0	2–2	1–0	0–2	1–2	0–1	1–0	1–3	2–2	0–0	2–2	1–1	3–1	1–1	0–3
Atlético Baleares	1–0	0–0	—	1–3	3–2	2–1	0–1	0–0	0–0	0–0	0–3	0–0	2–1	0–0	1–1	0–2	1–0	0–1	0–4	0–2
Badalona	1–0	0–1	2–0	—	4–0	1–0	2–1	2–1	1–3	2–2	2–2	0–0	1–1	3–0	0–0	1–0	0–0	2–3	0–3	3–0
Barcelona Atlètic	0–2	2–1	2–1	1–0	—	1–0	1–2	2–0	0–0	2–0	0–1	1–1	4–0	2–2	2–1	1–1	3–2	3–0	0–0	3–2
Benidorm	0–1	0–0	0–1	4–1	1–2	—	1–0	2–0	0–0	1–1	1–1	2–2	2–0	0–0	2–4	0–0	2–0	0–0	3–1	1–1
Dénia	2–2	1–0	4–0	0–2	0–0	0–0	—	1–1	1–0	1–1	0–0	1–1	1–3	1–0	1–0	0–0	3–2	2–0	0–0	3–1
Eivissa	4–2	1–1	2–0	1–1	2–3	3–2	0–0	—	3–1	2–2	1–1	1–0	1–0	5–6	2–2	1–1	1–2	0–2	1–1	1–1
Gavà	1–2	2–0	0–1	3–0	1–1	0–0	1–0	2–1	—	1–0	2–2	2–1	0–0	4–2	2–0	0–0	1–0	1–0	0–4	1–2
Gramenet	2–0	0–0	3–2	1–1	0–0	1–2	1–0	4–2	1–1	—	3–0	0–1	1–3	0–1	0–1	0–2	2–0	6–2	2–1	2–1
Lleida	0–0	0–0	1–0	0–2	0–3	0–0	1–0	1–0	1–0	0–0	—	3–2	1–1	1–1	0–0	0–0	5–1	5–1	4–0	0–0
Ontinyent	1–0	0–1	2–0	2–1	0–0	1–1	0–0	3–0	0–0	1–2	2–1	—	1–1	2–0	1–0	1–1	4–0	2–0	1–0	2–1
Orihuela	1–2	1–3	2–0	1–2	1–1	1–2	3–1	1–2	1–0	3–1	2–1	1–0	—	0–1	1–2	2–3	3–2	2–0	0–2	1–3
Osasuna B	2–1	1–0	2–2	1–0	2–2	0–2	1–1	3–3	2–3	0–0	0–2	0–2	4–0	—	1–2	0–1	1–0	1–0	4–0	2–2
Sabadell	0–0	2–1	1–1	0–0	2–2	0–1	1–1	1–0	5–2	2–2	4–1	1–2	1–0	1–1	—	3–0	2–1	3–2	2–0	2–2
Sant Andreu	1–1	1–0	1–0	0–0	1–0	2–1	2–0	2–1	0–0	1–2	3–2	2–2	1–1	1–1	1–2	—	1–0	0–1	5–1	3–2
Santa Eulàlia	1–3	1–1	1–0	1–1	1–0	2–1	1–1	2–0	3–1	0–1	0–1	2–1	0–1	1–1	4–0	1–1	—	0–1	0–2	0–3
Terrassa	3–2	0–0	1–0	0–1	1–1	3–1	2–1	0–0	3–3	1–3	2–1	2–3	0–2	0–1	1–3	1–2	1–0	—	2–2	0–1
Valencia Mestalla	1–1	3–1	1–2	3–2	0–0	1–1	4–1	1–1	1–0	4–1	1–2	0–0	0–0	4–0	1–2	1–1	0–1	3–4	—	0–2
Villarreal B	1–2	2–1	3–1	3–1	2–0	0–0	2–0	4–2	4–2	0–1	3–0	5–2	1–2	1–0	3–0	3–0	2–1	2–0	3–1	—

Source: BDFutbol
Legend: Blue = home team win; Yellow = draw; Red = away team win.

=== Top goalscorers ===
Last updated 10 May 2009

Goalscorers	Goals	Team
(Spain) Chando	22	Villarreal B
(Spain) Keko	21	Gavà
(Spain) José Manuel Meca	19	Gramenet
(Spain) David Prats	18	Badalona
(Spain) Joan Tomás	17	Villarreal B

=== Top goalkeepers ===
Last updated 10 May 2009

Goalkeeper	Goals	Matches	Average	Team
(Spain) José Miguel Morales	34	38	0.89	Sant Andreu
(Spain) David Rangel	34	37	0.92	Ontinyent
(Spain) Fernando Maestro	37	38	0.97	Alcoyano
(Spain) Eduardo Pérez	36	36	1	Lleida
(Spain) Rubén Miño	29	29	1	Barcelona Atlètic

== Group 4 ==
- Teams from Andalusia, Castile-La Mancha, Ceuta and Melilla.

=== Summary before 2008–09 season ===
- Scores and Classification - Group 4
- Playoffs de Ascenso:
  - Écija Balompié - Eliminated in Second Round
  - CD Linares - Eliminated in First Round
  - AD Ceuta - Eliminated in Second Round
  - Mérida UD - Eliminated in First Round

- Promoted to this group from Tercera División:
  - Roquetas - Founded in: 1970//, Based in: Roquetas de Mar, Andalusia//, Promoted From: Group 9
  - San Fernando - Founded in: 1943//, Based in: San Fernando, Andalusia//, Promoted From: Group 10
  - Antequera - Founded in: 1992//, Based in: Antequera, Andalusia//, Promoted From: Group 9
  - Real Balompédica Linense - Founded in: 1912//, Based in: La Linea de la Concepción, Andalusia//, Promoted From: Group 13

- Relegated to this group from Segunda División:
  - Polideportivo Ejido - Founded in: 1969//, Based in: El Ejido, Andalusia//, Relegated From: Segunda División
  - Granada 74 CF - Founded in: 2007//, Based in: Granada, Andalusia//, Relegated From: Segunda División
  - Cádiz CF - Founded in: 1910//, Based in: Cádiz, Andalusia//, Relegated From: Segunda División

- Relegated to Tercera División:
  - CD Baza - Founded in: 1970//, Based in: Baza, Andalusia//, Relegated to: Group 9
  - CD Alcalá - Founded in: 1946//, Based in: Alcala de Guadaira, Andalusia//, Relegated to: Group 10
  - Mazarrón - Founded in: 1928//, Based in: Mazarrón, Region of Murcia//, Relegated to: Group 13
  - Talavera - Founded in: 1948//, Based in: Talavera de la Reina, Castile-La Mancha//, Relegated to: Group 18
  - Algeciras - Founded in: 1912//, Based in: Algeciras, Andalusia//, Relegated to: Group 10

=== Teams ===
Location of teams in Segunda División B Gr. 1 2008–09

Group 4
	Team	Founded in	Based in	Ground
1	Cádiz	1910	Cádiz, Andalusia	Ramón de Carranza
2	Linense	1912	La Línea de la Concepción, Andalusia	Municipal de La Línea de la Concepción
3	Real Jaén	1922	Jaén, Andalusia	Nuevo La Victoria
4	Portuense	1928	El Puerto de Santa María, Andalusia	José del Cuvillo
5	Granada	1931	Granada, Andalusia	Nuevo Los Cármenes
6	Roquetas	1933	Roquetas de Mar, Andalusia	Antonio Peroles
7	San Fernando	1943	San Fernando, Andalusia	Bahía Sur
8	Conquense	1946	Cuenca, Castile-La Mancha	La Fuensanta
9	Guadalajara	1947	Guadalajara, Castile-La Mancha	Pedro Escartín
10	Puertollano	1948	Puertollano, Castile-La Mancha	Francisco Sánchez Menor
11	Betis B	1962	Seville, Andalusia	Ciudad Deportiva Ruíz de Lopera
12	Écija	1968	Ecija, Andalusia	San Pablo
13	Lucena	1968	Lucena, Andalusia	Ciudad Deportiva
14	Poli Ejido	1969	El Ejido, Andalusia	Santo Domingo
15	Melilla	1976	Melilla	Álvarez Claro
16	Linares	1990	Linares, Andalusia	Linarejos
17	Antequera	1992	Antequera, Andalusia	El Maulí
18	Ceuta	1996	Ceuta	Alfonso Murube
19	Marbella	1997	Marbella, Andalusia	Municipal de Marbella
20	Granada 74	2007	Granada, Andalusia	Escribano Castilla

=== League table ===
Pos	Team	Pld	W	D	L	GF	GA	GD	Pts	Qualification or relegation
1	Cádiz (C, O)	38	24	7	7	71	42	+29	79	Qualification to group champions' playoffs
2	Real Jaén	38	19	14	5	44	21	+23	71	Qualification to promotion playoffs
3	Poli Ejido	38	18	12	8	60	39	+21	66	Qualification to promotion playoffs
4	Marbella	38	16	16	6	48	33	+15	64	Qualification to promotion playoffs
5	Puertollano	38	17	12	9	56	36	+20	63	Qualification to Copa del Rey
6	Melilla	38	18	8	12	49	38	+11	62	Qualification to Copa del Rey
7	Ceuta	38	15	13	10	59	40	+19	58	Qualification to Copa del Rey
8	Conquense	38	16	9	13	55	57	−2	57	Qualification to Copa del Rey
9	Guadalajara	38	15	11	12	39	29	+10	56	
10	Granada	38	13	12	13	53	52	+1	51	
11	Real Betis B	38	12	12	14	52	52	0	48	
12	Roquetas	38	11	14	13	44	40	+4	47	
13	Écija	38	11	10	17	37	50	−13	43	
14	Linares (D)	38	11	10	17	41	54	−13	43 (Note: CD Linares was dissolved after the end of the season.)	
15	Lucena	38	10	10	18	47	62	−15	40	
16	Antequera (R)	38	10	10	18	43	56	−13	40	Qualification to relegation playoffs
17	San Fernando (D)	38	9	11	18	46	66	−20	38 (Note: CD San Fernando was dissolved after the end of the season.)	Relegation to Tercera División
18	Granada 74 (D)	38	9	9	20	34	61	−27	36 (Note: Granada 74 CF was dissolved after the end of the season.)	Relegation to Tercera División
19	Linense (R)	38	7	13	18	35	54	−19	34	Relegation to Tercera División
20	Portuense (R)	38	5	15	18	26	57	−31	30	Relegation to Tercera División

Rules for classification: 1st points; 2nd head-to-head; 3rd goal difference; 4th goals scored.
(C) Champions; (D) Dissolved; (O) Promoted through playoff; (R) Relegated

=== Results ===
Home \ Away	ANT	RBB	CÁD	CEU	CQS	ECJ	GRA	G74	GUA	LNR	LNS	LUC	MAR	MEL	PLD	POR	PUE	RJN	ROQ	SFE
Antequera	—	1–1	0–1	2–0	2–1	2–0	4–2	4–0	1–2	1–0	0–0	0–2	0–1	0–1	3–2	1–1	3–2	1–3	2–0	1–1
Betis B	2–2	—	0–1	0–2	2–3	3–0	3–2	0–0	1–1	3–1	2–1	1–0	0–1	3–1	1–2	2–1	2–1	1–2	1–3	4–1
Cádiz	3–0	1–1	—	5–2	2–3	1–0	2–3	2–0	1–2	2–0	1–2	2–1	3–3	3–0	1–0	1–0	1–1	0–0	1–0	6–2
Ceuta	2–0	1–1	1–2	—	3–0	3–0	3–0	3–0	2–2	0–0	1–1	3–0	2–0	1–0	0–1	5–1	1–2	2–5	0–0	2–0
Conquense	1–0	1–4	2–0	0–2	—	2–1	1–1	4–0	2–2	3–4	2–1	2–2	1–0	2–1	0–0	1–0	2–1	1–1	3–3	3–1
Écija	4–2	3–3	1–1	1–3	1–0	—	0–0	1–0	0–0	2–1	1–1	2–2	0–1	3–0	1–2	0–0	1–0	0–1	1–1	2–0
Granada	0–1	2–1	3–3	3–2	1–2	0–1	—	3–1	1–0	5–0	3–0	3–1	0–0	1–0	0–0	3–1	3–2	2–2	1–3	1–1
Granada 74	1–0	2–1	1–2	0–1	2–1	2–4	2–1	—	2–1	2–4	2–0	0–3	0–1	1–1	0–2	0–0	1–1	1–3	1–0	1–1
Guadalajara	3–0	2–2	1–2	0–0	0–1	0–1	0–1	1–0	—	1–1	2–0	2–0	1–0	1–0	2–1	1–3	1–0	0–1	0–0	1–0
Linares	5–4	1–2	1–3	0–3	0–1	2–0	1–1	0–0	0–3	—	1–0	0–2	0–1	0–0	1–3	4–0	1–0	0–0	0–0	1–2
Linense	3–1	1–0	2–2	0–0	1–2	1–0	1–1	0–3	2–2	0–1	—	2–3	0–1	2–3	1–1	2–0	0–1	0–1	2–2	2–1
Lucena	1–1	1–2	1–2	1–1	1–1	2–0	0–0	2–3	0–3	2–1	1–2	—	1–2	2–0	2–2	4–0	1–3	0–0	1–1	3–1
Marbella	1–0	1–1	2–1	1–1	2–2	3–0	1–1	2–0	1–0	1–1	3–0	3–0	—	2–2	2–1	1–0	2–2	0–0	1–1	3–3
Melilla	1–1	2–0	3–1	1–1	1–0	3–2	2–1	2–0	0–0	0–2	2–0	2–1	2–2	—	4–0	3–0	1–2	2–1	2–0	2–0
Poli Ejido	3–0	3–0	0–1	4–1	3–2	1–1	3–2	2–0	1–0	1–1	2–2	2–2	2–0	1–0	—	4–2	1–1	2–1	2–0	0–0
Portuense	0–0	1–1	1–2	3–3	0–0	1–0	0–0	2–1	0–0	1–1	2–0	1–2	0–0	0–3	2–2	—	0–2	0–3	0–0	0–2
Puertollano	1–0	0–0	0–2	0–0	3–0	3–1	3–1	2–2	0–1	1–1	2–0	4–0	1–1	2–0	0–0	1–0	—	1–0	1–0	2–0
Real Jaén	0–0	0–0	0–1	1–0	2–0	0–0	3–0	1–0	1–0	0–1	3–2	1–0	1–1	0–0	1–0	0–0	2–2	—	1–0	1–1
Roquetas	2–2	2–0	0–2	2–1	5–2	1–2	2–0	1–1	1–0	3–0	0–0	3–0	1–0	0–1	0–3	1–2	1–1	0–1	—	3–0
San Fernando	3–1	2–1	3–4	1–1	2–1	2–0	0–1	2–2	0–1	0–4	0–0	4–0	2–1	0–1	2–1	1–1	3–5	0–1	2–2	—

Source: BDFutbol
Legend: Blue = home team win; Yellow = draw; Red = away team win.

=== Top goalscorers ===
Last updated 10 May 2009

Goalscorers	Goals	Team
(United Arab Emirates) Tariq Spezie	24	Puertollano
(Spain) Jorge Molina	19	Poli Ejido
(Nigeria) Elvis Onyema	19	Ceuta
(Argentina) Mariano Toedtli	16	Cádiz
(Spain) Andrés Ramos	15	Melilla

=== Top goalkeepers ===
Last updated 10 May 2009

Goalkeeper	Goals	Matches	Average	Team
(Venezuela) Dani Hernández	21	38	0.55	Real Jaén
(Uruguay) Álvaro Núñez	19	29	0.66	Guadalajara
(Spain) Alejandro Avila	33	37	0.89	Marbella
(Spain) Joaquín Valerio	30	32	0.94	Poli Ejido
(Spain) Noé Calleja	36	38	0.95	Puertollano
