= Juan Carlos Castilla (footballer) =

Spanish footballer

Personal information
- Full name: Juan Carlos Castilla Gómez
- Date of birth: 10 June 1978 (age 48)
- Place of birth: Huelva, Spain
- Height: 1.88 m (6 ft 2 in)
- Position: Goalkeeper

Senior career*
Years	Team	Apps	(Gls)
1998–2001	Recreativo	0	(0)
2001–2002	Linense	27	(0)
2002–2004	Jerez	44	(0)
2004–2006	Gramenet	64	(0)
2006–2008	Lleida	47	(0)
2008–2010	Cartagena	8	(0)
2010–2011	Palencia	37	(0)
2011–2013	Logroñés	49	(0)
Total		276	(0)
- * Club domestic league appearances and goals

Juan Carlos Castilla Gómez (born 10 June 1978) is a Spanish former footballer who played as a goalkeeper.

== Club career ==
Born in Huelva, Andalusia, Castilla made his senior debut with the local Recreativo de Huelva but has yet to establish himself there. In 1999–2000's Segunda División, he was only the third choice and made no appearances in the league during his spell. Subsequently, he moved to the Segunda División B with Real Balompédica Linense, then spent two more years at that level with Jerez CF.

Castilla joined UDA Gramenet in division three in the summer of 2004, appearing in 66 league matches, including the unsuccessful promotion play-offs. Afterwards, he signed with UE Lleida, also in Catalonia and the third tier, where he started most of the time.

In the 2008–09 season, Castilla started representing FC Cartagena, featuring sporadically in an eventual return of the club to the second division. In July 2010, after only playing twice during the campaign for the fifth-placed team – his league debut as a professional on 5 December 2009 in a 1–2 away loss against CD Numancia– he signed with third-tier side CF Palencia.
