= Edu Espada =

Spanish footballer

Personal information
- Full name: Eduardo Espada Gallardo
- Date of birth: 8 March 1981 (age 45)
- Place of birth: Los Corrales, Spain
- Height: 1.82 m (6 ft 0 in)
- Position: Striker

Youth career
- Sevilla

Senior career*
Years	Team	Apps	(Gls)
2000–2001	Díter Zafra		
2001–2002	Mérida	31	(6)
2002–2003	Ciudad Murcia	18	(4)
2003	Zamora	8	(0)
2004	Marbella	24	(6)
2005	Mar Menor		
2005–2006	Talavera	34	(20)
2006–2007	Racing Ferrol	17	(6)
2007–2008	Águilas	38	(8)
2008–2009	Atlético Ciudad	22	(2)
2009–2010	Écija	33	(9)
2010	Târgu Mureş	4	(0)
2011	Ontinyent	0	(0)
2011–2012	Guijuelo	27	(5)
2012–2013	Arroyo	24	(6)
- * Club domestic league appearances and goals as of 19 May 2013

Eduardo 'Edu' Espada Gallardo (born 8 March 1981) is a retired Spanish footballer who played as a striker.

== Club career ==
In his country, Espada never played in higher than Segunda División B. He represented seven teams in the category, his best year being with Talavera CF in 2005–06 when he topped group IV's scoring charts to help his team to the 14th position; he also competed in that level with Mérida UD, Ciudad de Murcia, Zamora CF, UD Marbella, Racing de Ferrol, Águilas CF, CF Atlético Ciudad and Écija Balompié.

In July 2010, Espada signed for Romanian club FCM Târgu Mureş as a free agent. However, after only a few months with the Liga I side, he returned to his country, joining another team in division three, Ontinyent CF.
