= CD Alfaro =

Association football club in Spain

Alfaro
- Full name: Club Deportivo Alfaro
- Short name: ALF
- Founded: 2 July 1922; 104 years ago
- Stadium: La Molineta, Alfaro
- Capacity: 4,000
- President: Francisco Javier García Luna
- Head coach: Blas Terroba Sáenz
- League: Tercera Federación – Group 16
- 2025–26: Segunda Federación – Group 2, 18th of 18 (relegated)
- Website: cdalfaro.net46.net
Home colours	Away colours

Club Deportivo Alfaro is a Spanish football team based in Alfaro, in the autonomous community of La Rioja. Founded in 1922 it plays in Tercera Federación – Group 16, holding home matches at Estadio La Molineta, with a capacity of 4,000 seats.

== History ==
In the 2013–14 season the club finished 6th in the Tercera División, Group 16. The club finished 8th in the 2018–19 season in Tercera.

== Season to season ==
Season	Tier	Division	Place	Copa del Rey
1952–53	5	2ª Reg.	9th	
1953–54	4	1ª Reg.	5th	
1954–55	4	1ª Reg.	2nd	
1955–56	4	1ª Reg.	2nd	
1956–57	4	1ª Reg.	3rd	
1957–58	4	1ª Reg.	2nd	
1958–59	4	1ª Reg.	1st	
1959–60	3	3ª	11th	
1960–61	3	3ª	7th	
1961–62	3	3ª	7th	
1962–63	3	3ª	7th	
1963–64	3	3ª	9th	
1964–65	3	3ª	9th	
1965–66	3	3ª	12th	
1966–67	3	3ª	15th	
1967–68	4	1ª Reg.	6th	
1968–69	4	1ª Reg.	14th	
1969–70	4	1ª Reg.	5th	
1970–71	4	1ª Reg.	5th	
1971–72	4	1ª Reg.	9th	

Season	Tier	Division	Place	Copa del Rey
1972–73	4	1ª Reg.	16th	
1973–74	5	2ª Reg.	2nd	
1974–75	4	Reg. Pref.	1st	
1975–76	3	3ª	18th	
1976–77	4	Reg. Pref.	6th	
1977–78	5	Reg. Pref.	9th	
1978–79	5	Reg. Pref.	13th	
1979–80	5	Reg. Pref.	9th	
1980–81	5	Reg. Pref.	1st	
1981–82	4	3ª	17th	
1982–83	4	3ª	10th	
1983–84	4	3ª	8th	
1984–85	4	3ª	19th	
1985–86	5	Reg. Pref.	1st	
1986–87	4	3ª	8th	
1987–88	4	3ª	8th	
1988–89	4	3ª	15th	
1989–90	4	3ª	3rd	
1990–91	4	3ª	4th	First round
1991–92	4	3ª	6th	First round

Season	Tier	Division	Place	Copa del Rey
1992–93	4	3ª	10th	Second round
1993–94	4	3ª	15th	
1994–95	4	3ª	6th	
1995–96	4	3ª	6th	
1996–97	4	3ª	5th	
1997–98	4	3ª	15th	
1998–99	4	3ª	12th	
1999–2000	4	3ª	11th	
2000–01	4	3ª	3rd	
2001–02	3	2ª B	20th	
2002–03	4	3ª	2nd	
2003–04	3	2ª B	9th	
2004–05	3	2ª B	14th	
2005–06	3	2ª B	13th	
2006–07	3	2ª B	17th	
2007–08	4	3ª	1st (Note: Promoted due to CD Logroñés' relegation)	
2008–09	3	2ª B	19th	First round
2009–10	4	3ª	2nd	
2010–11	4	3ª	7th	
2011–12	4	3ª	2nd	

Season	Tier	Division	Place	Copa del Rey
2012–13	4	3ª	2nd	
2013–14	4	3ª	6th	
2014–15	4	3ª	7th	
2015–16	4	3ª	7th	
2016–17	4	3ª	7th	
2017–18	4	3ª	7th	
2018–19	4	3ª	8th	
2019–20	4	3ª	10th	
2020–21	4	3ª	1st / 3rd	
2021–22	5	3ª RFEF	2nd	
2022–23	4	2ª Fed.	15th	
2023–24	5	3ª Fed.	2nd	
2024–25	4	2ª Fed.	10th	First round
2025–26	4	2ª Fed.	18th	
2026–27	5	3ª Fed.		

- 6 seasons in Segunda División B
- 3 seasons in Segunda Federación
- 42 seasons in Tercera División
- 3 seasons in Tercera Federación/Tercera División RFEF
