= Iñigo Díaz de Cerio =

Spanish footballer

Personal information
- Full name: Iñigo Díaz de Cerio Conejero
- Date of birth: 15 May 1984 (age 42)
- Place of birth: San Sebastián, Spain
- Height: 1.77 m (5 ft 10 in)
- Position: Striker

Youth career
- Anunciata Ikastetxea
- Sporting Herrera
- 2000–2002: Antiguoko
- 2002–2003: Real Sociedad

Senior career*
| Years | Team | Apps | (Gls) |
| 2003–2006 | Real Sociedad B | 86 | (39) |
| 2006–2009 | Real Sociedad | 77 | (24) |
| 2009–2012 | Athletic Bilbao | 7 | (0) |
| 2010–2011 | → Córdoba (loan) | 8 | (1) |
| 2011–2012 | → Numancia (loan) | 24 | (8) |
| 2012–2014 | Mirandés | 68 | (14) |
| Total | | 270 | (86) |
- * Club domestic league appearances and goals

Iñigo Díaz de Cerio Conejero (born 15 May 1984) is a Spanish retired footballer who played as a striker.

== Club career ==
De Cerio was born in San Sebastián, Basque Country. Having finished his football grooming with Real Sociedad, he was the top scorer (across all four groups) in the third division with the B-team in the 2005–06 season, and also made his La Liga debut on 12 February 2006 in a 0–1 away loss against Atlético Madrid. In 2007–08, he scored 16 second level goals as the main squad finished fourth, falling short of a return to the top flight.

On 8 November 2008, Díaz de Cerio suffered a serious injury after a collision with SD Eibar player Zigor, fracturing the tibia and the fibula of his right leg. After a successful surgery, the club medical's staff nonetheless stated that the recovery would be "very slow", and the player was expected to miss the vast majority of the campaign.

In late June 2009, Díaz de Cerio switched to neighbours Athletic Bilbao on a four-year deal after his Real contract had just expired. He returned to action almost one year after his injury (5 November 2009), playing 30 minutes in a 1–1 draw at C.D. Nacional in the group stage of the UEFA Europa League.

On 13 August 2010, Córdoba CF confirmed Díaz de Cerio's loan for one year. In the following transfer window, however, he was recalled by Athletic Bilbao.

From 2011 to 2014, Díaz de Cerio competed in the second tier and scored a combined 22 goals for CD Numancia and CD Mirandés. In June 2014, however, aged only 30, he announced his retirement from football.
