= CD Raqui San Isidro =

Spanish football club

Raqui San Isidro
- Full name: Club Deportivo Raqui San Isidro
- Nickname: Raqui
- Founded: 1970
- Ground: La Palmera, San Isidro, Canary Islands, Spain
- Capacity: 2,500
- Chairman: (Spain) Julián Santos
- Manager: (Spain) Toni Ayala
- League: Interinsular Preferente
- 2024–25: Interinsular Preferente, 14th of 21
| Home colours | Away colours |

Club Deportivo Raqui San Isidro is a Spanish football team based in San Isidro, in the autonomous community of Canary Islands. Founded in 1970 it plays in Interinsular Preferente, holding home matches at Estadio La Palmera, with a 2,500-seat capacity.

== Season to season ==
| Season | Tier | Division | Place | Copa del Rey |
|---|---|---|---|---|
| 1970–71 | 6 | 3ª Reg. | | |
| 1971–72 | 6 | 3ª Reg. | | |
| 1972–73 | 6 | 3ª Reg. | 4th | |
| 1973–74 | 6 | 3ª Reg. | 7th | |
| 1974–75 | 6 | 3ª Reg. | 11th | |
| 1975–76 | 6 | 3ª Reg. | 10th | |
| 1976–77 | 6 | 3ª Reg. | 13th | |
| 1977–78 | 7 | 2ª Reg. | 10th | |
| 1978–79 | 7 | 2ª Reg. | 12th | |
| 1979–80 | 7 | 2ª Reg. | 7th | |
| 1980–81 | 7 | 2ª Reg. | 5th | |
| 1981–82 | 7 | 2ª Reg. | 7th | |
| 1982–83 | 7 | 2ª Reg. | 4th | |
| 1983–84 | 7 | 2ª Reg. | | |
| 1984–85 | 7 | 2ª Terr. | 2nd | |
| 1985–86 | 7 | 2ª Terr. | 4th | |
| 1986–87 | 7 | 2ª Terr. | 4th | |
| 1987–88 | 7 | 2ª Terr. | 12th | |
| 1988–89 | 7 | 2ª Terr. | 2nd | |
| 1989–90 | 7 | 2ª Terr. | 10th | |

| Season | Tier | Division | Place | Copa del Rey |
|---|---|---|---|---|
| 1990–91 | 7 | 2ª Terr. | 8th | |
| 1991–92 | 7 | 2ª Terr. | 1st | |
| 1992–93 | 6 | 1ª Terr. | 4th | |
| 1993–94 | 6 | 1ª Terr. | 1st | |
| 1994–95 | 5 | Int. Pref. | 3rd | |
| 1995–96 | 5 | Int. Pref. | 9th | |
| 1996–97 | 5 | Int. Pref. | 1st | |
| 1997–98 | 4 | 3ª | 7th | |
| 1998–99 | 4 | 3ª | 5th | |
| 1999–2000 | 4 | 3ª | 5th | |
| 2000–01 | 4 | 3ª | 4th | |
| 2001–02 | 4 | 3ª | 6th | |
| 2002–03 | 4 | 3ª | 7th | |
| 2003–04 | 4 | 3ª | 6th | |
| 2004–05 | 4 | 3ª | 2nd | |
| 2005–06 | 3 | 2ª B | 18th | |
| 2006–07 | 4 | 3ª | 2nd | |
| 2007–08 | 3 | 2ª B | 20th | Second round |
| 2008–09 | 5 | Int. Pref. | 2nd | |
| 2009–10 | 5 | Int. Pref. | 2nd | |

| Season | Tier | Division | Place | Copa del Rey |
|---|---|---|---|---|
| 2010–11 | 4 | 3ª | 19th | |
| 2011–12 | 5 | Int. Pref. | 1st | |
| 2012–13 | 4 | 3ª | 17th | |
| 2013–14 | 4 | 3ª | 18th | |
| 2014–15 | 5 | Int. Pref. | 2nd | |
| 2015–16 | 5 | Int. Pref. | 11th | |
| 2016–17 | 5 | Int. Pref. | 7th | |
| 2017–18 | DNP | | | |
| 2018–19 | 7 | 2ª Int. | 1st | |
| 2019–20 | 6 | 1ª Int. | 3rd | |
| 2020–21 | 5 | Int. Pref. | 13th | |
| 2021–22 | 7 | 1ª Int. | 3rd | |
| 2022–23 | 7 | 1ª Int. | 10th | |
| 2023–24 | 7 | 1ª Int. | 1st | |
| 2024–25 | 6 | Int. Pref. | 14th | |
| 2025–26 | 6 | Int. Pref. | | |

- 2 seasons in Segunda División B
- 12 seasons in Tercera División

== Famous players ==
- (Argentina) Fernando Pierucci
- (Ghana) Baba Sule
- (Spain) Pedro; his sale to Chelsea ensured the future of the club as they received £320,000 as part of the transfer.
- (Venezuela) Pana Castillo
