= Águilas CF =

Águilas
- Full name: Águilas Club de Fútbol
- Founded: 1925
- Dissolved: 2010
- Ground: El Rubial, Águilas, Murcia, Spain
- Capacity: 3,000
| Home colours | Away colours |

Águilas Club de Fútbol was a Spanish football team in Águilas, in the autonomous community of Murcia. Founded in 1925 and dissolved in 2010, it played its last season (2009–10) in Segunda División B – Group 2, holding home games at Estadio El Rubial with a 3,000 seat capacity.

== History ==
Águilas FC was founded in 1925, and played most of its history in lower levels. In July 2010, after five consecutive seasons in the third division, the club disappeared due to heavy debts.

=== The origin of football in Águilas ===
Águilas FC was founded in 1925, but before the foundation of this one, other teams existed. In 1896 the Sporting Club Aguileño was founded. This team was the best of the region during the decade of 1900, because they won 26 matches of 26, without giving up a goal. The Sporting Club Aguileño disappeared in 1907 due to the lack of rivals. The Club Deportivo Aguileño was founded in 1907 and remained undefeated until 1917. The CD Aguileño folded in 1921 due to economic problems. Until 1925 the only teams in Águilas were the Arenas, Gimnástico and Universitari. In September 1924 the Region of Murcia Football Federation was created, but none of the Águilas teams enrolled in the federation; however, that year the Águilas FC played a match against Real Murcia.

=== Águilas CF foundation ===
Immediately, a new club was founded in the city, Águilas FC, which started playing in the regional leagues.

In 1925 the Águilas FC was founded. The team played its first match against Almería FC and the result was 1–1. The team can't have high aspirations, because their best players played in Lorca FC. After being in regional categories for several years, the team debuted in Tercera División in 1956 and in 1998 debuted in Segunda División B.

=== Debut in Segunda B and the Segunda División B play-offs ===
In 1999, their first season in Segunda B, they managed to achieve the permanency, but the team was relegated to Tercera División. Águilas CF return to Segunda B in 2005, they ended the season in second position and they played their first Segunda División B play-off, but they were eliminated by Alicante CF in the first round.

In 2007, Águilas Cf received the Royal Order of Sports Merit silver plate granted by the Sports Council. After the 2008 elections, one Murcia's businessman called Antonio Vicente García became president of the club. Antonio starts a project to reach the Segunda División B play-off again, but the project fails and the team gets involved in serious economic problems.

== Uniform ==
The official uniform is based on a blue and white shirt with vertical stripes, a blue sport pants and a white and blue socks with horizontal stripes.

== Stadium ==
The Águilas CF played their games in Estadio El Rubial. The stadium seats 4000 spectators and was football's oldest stadium active in Spain after “El Molinón”. Its dimensions are 95x65 meters.

== Season to season ==
| Season | Tier | Division | Place | Copa del Rey |
|---|---|---|---|---|
| 1943–44 | 4 | 1ª Reg. | 2nd | |
| 1944–45 | DNP | | | |
| 1945–46 | DNP | | | |
| 1946–47 | DNP | | | |
| 1947–48 | 4 | 1ª Reg. | 3rd | |
| 1948–49 | 4 | 1ª Reg. | 11th | |
| 1949–50 | 4 | 1ª Reg. | 3rd | |
| 1950–51 | 4 | 1ª Reg. | 5th | |
| 1951–52 | 4 | 1ª Reg. | 6th | |
| 1952–53 | 4 | 1ª Reg. | 9th | |
| 1953–54 | DNP | | | |
| 1954–55 | 4 | 1ª Reg. | 6th | |
| 1955–56 | 4 | 1ª Reg. | 6th | |
| 1956–57 | 3 | 3ª | 15th | |
| 1957–58 | 3 | 3ª | 10th | |
| 1958–59 | 3 | 3ª | 8th | |
| 1959–60 | 3 | 3ª | 14th | |
| 1960–61 | 3 | 3ª | 15th | |
| 1961–62 | 3 | 3ª | 10th | |
| 1962–63 | 3 | 3ª | 14th | |

| Season | Tier | Division | Place | Copa del Rey |
|---|---|---|---|---|
| 1963–64 | 3 | 3ª | 15th | |
| 1964–65 | 4 | 1ª Reg. | 2nd | |
| 1965–66 | 3 | 3ª | 5th | |
| 1966–67 | 3 | 3ª | 10th | |
| 1967–68 | 3 | 3ª | 10th | |
| 1968–69 | 3 | 3ª | 19th | |
| 1969–70 | 4 | 1ª Reg. | 14th | |
| 1970–71 | 5 | 2ª Reg. | 3rd | |
| 1971–72 | 5 | 1ª Reg. | 4th | |
| 1972–73 | 5 | 1ª Reg. | 6th | |
| 1973–74 | 5 | 1ª Reg. | 13th | |
| 1974–75 | 5 | 1ª Reg. | 10th | |
| 1975–76 | 5 | 1ª Reg. | 6th | |
| 1976–77 | 5 | 1ª Reg. | 10th | |
| 1977–78 | 6 | 1ª Reg. | 1st | |
| 1978–79 | 5 | Reg. Pref. | 13th | |
| 1979–80 | 5 | Reg. Pref. | 13th | |
| 1980–81 | 4 | 3ª | 14th | |
| 1981–82 | 4 | 3ª | 14th | |
| 1982–83 | 4 | 3ª | 9th | |

| Season | Tier | Division | Place | Copa del Rey |
|---|---|---|---|---|
| 1983–84 | 4 | 3ª | 17th | |
| 1984–85 | 4 | 3ª | 7th | |
| 1985–86 | 4 | 3ª | 6th | |
| 1986–87 | 4 | 3ª | 14th | |
| 1987–88 | 4 | 3ª | 12th | |
| 1988–89 | 4 | 3ª | 18th | |
| 1989–90 | 4 | 3ª | 2nd | |
| 1990–91 | 4 | 3ª | 4th | |
| 1991–92 | 4 | 3ª | 2nd | |
| 1992–93 | 4 | 3ª | 10th | |
| 1993–94 | 4 | 3ª | 1st | |
| 1994–95 | 4 | 3ª | 2nd | |
| 1995–96 | 4 | 3ª | 4th | |
| 1996–97 | 4 | 3ª | 4th | |

| Season | Tier | Division | Place | Copa del Rey |
|---|---|---|---|---|
| 1997–98 | 4 | 3ª | 2nd | |
| 1998–99 | 3 | 2ª B | 15th | |
| 1999–2000 | 3 | 2ª B | 20th | |
| 2000–01 | 4 | 3ª | 6th | |
| 2001–02 | 4 | 3ª | 3rd | |
| 2002–03 | 4 | 3ª | 4th | |
| 2003–04 | 4 | 3ª | 6th | |
| 2004–05 | 4 | 3ª | 1st | |
| 2005–06 | 3 | 2ª B | 2nd | |
| 2006–07 | 3 | 2ª B | 8th | |
| 2007–08 | 3 | 2ª B | 6th | |
| 2008–09 | 3 | 2ª B | 10th | |
| 2009–10 | 3 | 2ª B | 20th | |

- 7 seasons in Segunda División B
- 35 seasons in Tercera División (12 on 3rd tier)
