= 2009 Segunda División B play-offs =

Spanish football league play-offs

The 2009 Segunda División B play-offs (Playoffs de Ascenso or Promoción de Ascenso) were the final playoffs for promotion from 2008–09 Segunda División B to the 2009–10 Segunda División. The four first placed teams in each of the four Segunda División B groups played the Playoffs de Ascenso and the four last placed teams in Segunda División were relegated to Segunda División B. It also decided the two teams which placed 16th to be relegated to the 2009–10 Tercera División.

== New Format ==
Starting with the 2008–09 season, the four group winners had the opportunity to promote directly and become the overall Segunda División B champion. The four group winners were drawn into a two-legged series where the two winners promoted to the Liga Adelante and entered into the final for the Segunda División B champion. The two losing semifinalists entered the playoff round for the last two promotion spots.

The four group runners-up were drawn against one of the three fourth-placed teams outside their group while the four third-placed teams were drawn against each other in a two-legged series. The six winners advanced with the two losing semifinalists to determine the four teams that entered the last two-legged series for the last two promotion spots. In all the playoff series, the lower-ranked club played at home first. Whenever there was a tie in position (e.g. like the group winners in the Semifinal Round and Final or the third-placed teams in the first round), a draw determined the club to play at home first.

== Group Winners promotion play-off ==
=== Qualified teams ===
The draw were held in the RFEF headquarters, in Las Rozas (Madrid), on 11 May 2009, 16:30 CEST.

Group	Team
1	Real Unión
2	Cartagena
3	Alcoyano
4	Cádiz

=== Matches ===
==== Semifinals ====
Team 1	Agg.	Team 2	1st leg	2nd leg
Cartagena	4–3	Alcoyano	2–1	2–2
Cádiz	1–0	Real Unión	1–0	0–0

The aggregate winners will be promoted and qualified to the 2009–10 Segunda División B Final. The aggregate losers will be relegated to the Non–champions Promotion Play–off Second Round.

===== First leg =====
17 May 2009	Cartagena	2 – 1	Alcoyano	Cartagena (Murcia)
19:00 CEST				Stadium: Cartagonova

17 May 2009	Cádiz	1 – 0	Real Unión	Cádiz (Andalusia)
21:00 CEST				Stadium: Ramón de Carranza

===== Second leg =====
24 May 2009	Alcoyano	2 – 2	Cartagena	Alcoy (Valencia)
19:00 CEST				Stadium: El Collao

24 May 2009	Real Unión	0 – 0	Cádiz	Irun (Basque Country)
19:00 CEST				Stadium: Gal

Promoted to Segunda División
Cartagena (First time ever)	Cádiz (1 year later)

==== Final ====
Team 1	Agg.	Team 2	1st leg	2nd leg
Cartagena	2–3	Cádiz	1–2	1–1

===== First leg =====
31 May 2009	Cartagena	1 – 2	Cádiz	Cartagena (Murcia)
19:00 CEST				Stadium: Cartagonova

===== Second leg =====
6 June 2009	Cádiz	1 – 1 (3 – 2 agg.)	Cartagena	Cádiz (Andalusia)
19:30 CEST				Stadium: Ramón de Carranza

Segunda División B
2008–09 Winners
Cádiz

== Non-champions promotion play-off ==
=== First round ===
==== Qualified teams ====
Group	Position	Team
1	2nd	Cultural Leonesa
2	2nd	Lorca
3	2nd	Villarreal B
4	2nd	Real Jaén

Group	Position	Team
1	3rd	Ponferradina
2	3rd	Alcorcón
3	3rd	Sant Andreu
4	3rd	Poli Ejido

Group	Position	Team
1	4th	Zamora
2	4th	Leganés
3	4th	Sabadell
4	4th	Marbella

==== Matches ====
Team 1	Agg.	Team 2	1st leg	2nd leg
Sabadell	2–1	Cultural Leonesa	1–1	1–0
Leganés	2–7	Real Jaén	2–2	0–5
Marbella	1–2	Lorca	0–2	1–0
Zamora	0–4	Villarreal B	0–2	0–2
Sant Andreu	2–4	Alcorcón	0–0	2–4
Poli Ejido	1–3	Ponferradina	0–0	1–3

=== Second round ===
==== Qualified teams ====
Group	Position	Team
1	1st	Real Unión
3	1st	Alcoyano

Group	Position	Team
2	2nd	Lorca
3	2nd	Villarreal B
4	2nd	Real Jaén

Group	Position	Team
1	3rd	Ponferradina
2	3rd	Alcorcón

Group	Position	Team
3	4th	Sabadell

==== Matches ====
Team 1	Agg.	Team 2	1st leg	2nd leg
Sabadell	1–2	Real Unión	0–1	1–1
Alcorcón	2–2 (a)	Alcoyano	1–0	1–2
Ponferradina	2–2 (a)	Real Jaén	2–1	0–1
Villarreal B	4–2	Lorca	1–0	3–2

=== Third round ===
==== Qualified teams ====
Group	Position	Team
1	1st	Real Unión

Group	Position	Team
3	2nd	Villarreal B
4	2nd	Real Jaén

Group	Position	Team
2	3rd	Alcorcón

==== Matches ====
Team 1	Agg.	Team 2	1st leg	2nd leg
Villarreal B	2–1	Real Jaén	0–0	2–1
Alcorcón	1–3	Real Unión	0–0	1–3

Promoted to Segunda División
Villarreal B (First time ever)	Real Unión (44 years later)

== Relegation play-off ==
=== Qualified teams ===
Group	Team
1	Sporting B
2	Las Palmas Atlético
3	Terrassa
4	Antequera

=== Matches ===
Team 1	Agg.	Team 2	1st leg	2nd leg
Terrassa	5–2	Antequera	2–0	3–2
Las Palmas Atlético	0–4	Sporting B	0–0	0–4

Relegated to Tercera División
Antequera	Las Palmas Atlético
