= 2005 Segunda División B play-offs =

Spanish football league play-offs

The 2005 Segunda División B play-offs (Playoffs de Ascenso or Promoción de Ascenso) were the final playoffs for promotion from 2004–05 Segunda División B to the 2005–06 Segunda División. The four first-placed teams in each of the four Segunda División B groups played the Playoffs de Ascenso, and the four last-placed teams in Segunda División were relegated to Segunda División B.

It was won by Real Madrid B, beating UB Conquense 0–1 in the final at the Santiago Bernabéu, courtesy of a goal from Alberto Alejandro Gutiérrez.

== Teams for 2004/2005 play-off ==
- RSD Alcalá
- SD Ponferradina
- AD Ceuta
- Hércules CF
- Sevilla B
- Zamora CF
- CD Castellón
- Universidad de Las Palmas CF
- Alicante CF
- Rayo Vallecano
- Real Zaragoza B
- Lorca Deportiva CF
- Real Unión
- Burgos CF
- UB Conquense
- Real Madrid B

== Eliminatories ==
=== First round ===
5 June 2005 Home Matches:
RSD Alcalá	1–1	SD Ponferradina
AD Ceuta	0–1	Hercules CF
Zamora CF	0–0	Sevilla FC B
Castellón	0–0	Universidad de L.P. CF
Lorca Deportiva	1–0	Alicante CF
Rayo Vallecano	1–1	Real Unión
Real Zaragoza B	0–0	Real Madrid B
Burgos CF	0–0	UB Conquense

12 June 2005 Away Matches:
SD Ponferradina	0–1	RSD Alcalá	Agg:1-2
Hercules CF	2–0	AD Ceuta	Agg:3–0
Sevilla FC B	1–1	Zamora CF	Agg:1–1
Universidad de L.P. CF	1–2	Castellón	Agg:1–2
Alicante CF	1–2	Lorca Deportiva	Agg:1–3
Real Unión	1–0	Rayo Vallecano	Agg:2–1
Real Madrid B	2–0	Real Zaragoza B	Agg:2–0
UB Conquense	1–0	Burgos CF	Agg:1–0

=== Second round ===
Group A--Second Eliminatory

- Home Match

18-Jun-2005	RSD Alcalá	1–3	Hercules CF	Stadium:Virgen del Val (Alcalá de Henares)

- Away Match

26-Jun-2005	Hercules CF	1–1	RSD Alcalá	Stadium:José Rico Pérez (Alicante)

Promoted to Segunda División: Hércules CF

Group B--Second Eliminatory

- Home Match

19-Jun-2005	Zamora CF	2–1	CD Castellón	Stadium:Ruta de la Plata (Zamora)

- Away Match

26-Jun-2005	CD Castellón	1–0	Zamora CF	Stadium:Nou Castalia (Castellón)

Promoted to Segunda División: CD Castellón

Group C--Second Eliminatory

- Home Match

19-Jun-2005	Lorca CF	1–2	Real Unión	Stadium:Francisco Artes Carrasco (Lorca)

- Away Match

26-Jun-2005	Real Unión	1–3	Lorca FC	Stadium:Stadium Gal (Irún)

Promoted to Segunda División: Lorca Deportiva CF

Group D--Second Eliminatory

- Home Match

18-Jun-2005	UB Conquense	0–2	Real Madrid B	Stadium:La Fuensanta (Cuenca)

- Away Match

26-Jun-2005	Real Madrid B	0–1	UB Conquense	Stadium: Santiago Bernabéu (Madrid)

Promoted to Segunda División: Real Madrid B
