= 2006 Segunda División B play-offs =

Spanish football league play-offs

The 2006 Segunda División B play-offs (Playoffs de Ascenso or Promoción de Ascenso) were the final playoffs for promotion from 2005–06 Segunda División B to the 2006–07 Segunda División. The four first placed teams in each of the four Segunda División B groups played the Playoffs de Ascenso and the four last placed teams in Segunda División were relegated to Segunda División B. It also decided the one team which placed 16th to be relegated to the 2006–07 Tercera División.

The top four placed teams from each group in the Segunda División B played in the Liguilla de Ascenso. Each liguilla contained one team from each of the four regular season groups. Teams were then drawn to plan one another with the 1st placed team in each group playing the 4th placed team, and the 2nd placed playing 3rd. The winners of these ties then played each other with the winning team being promoted.

The teams finishing 16th in each group of the Segunda División B were drawn into 2 pairs, with the losing teams then played each other with the losing team being relegated to the Tercera División.

All ties were two-legged, with each team playing once at home. The winner of each tie was determined by aggregate score, with draws being separated by the away goals rule or a penalty shoot-out where necessary.

== Promotion play-offs ==
The regular season finished on the 27 May and the play-offs began on the 3 June.

=== Group A ===
Group	Place	Team
1	2nd	Pontevedra
2	1st	Salamanca
3	4th	Gramenet
4	3rd	Sevilla Atlético

==== Semifinals ====
Team 1	Agg.	Team 2	1st leg	2nd leg
Sevilla Atlético	2–2 (5–3 p)	Pontevedra	0–2	2–0
Gramenet	3–6	Salamanca	2–3	1–3

==== Final ====
Team 1	Agg.	Team 2	1st leg	2nd leg
Sevilla Atlético	0–1	Salamanca	0–0	0–1

Promoted to Segunda División
Salamanca
(1 year later)

=== Group B ===
Group	Place	Team
1	3rd	Las Palmas
2	2nd	Real Sociedad B
3	1st	Badalona
4	4th	Linares

==== Semifinals ====
Team 1	Agg.	Team 2	1st leg	2nd leg
Linares	5–2	Badalona	2–0	3–2
Las Palmas	(a) 2–2	Real Sociedad B	1–0	1–2

==== Final ====
Team 1	Agg.	Team 2	1st leg	2nd leg
Linares	2–3	Las Palmas	2–2	0–1

Promoted to Segunda División
Las Palmas
(2 years later)

=== Group C ===
Group	Place	Team
1	4th	Vecindario
2	3rd	Burgos
3	2nd	Levante B
4	1st	Cartagena

==== Semifinals ====
Team 1	Agg.	Team 2	1st leg	2nd leg
Vecindario	3–2	Cartagena	2–2	1–0
Burgos	0–2	Levante B	0–1	0–1

==== Final ====
Team 1	Agg.	Team 2	1st leg	2nd leg
Vecindario	3–2	Levante B	2–0	1–2

Promoted to Segunda División
Vecindario
(First time ever)

=== Group D ===
Group	Place	Team
1	1st	Universidad LPGC
2	4th	Ponferradina
3	3rd	Alicante
4	2nd	Águilas

==== Semifinals ====
Team 1	Agg.	Team 2	1st leg	2nd leg
Ponferradina	5–3	Universidad LPGC	3–2	2–1
Alicante	2–1	Águilas	2–1	0–0

==== Final ====
Team 1	Agg.	Team 2	1st leg	2nd leg
Ponferradina	2–1	Alicante	1–1	1–0

Promoted to Segunda División
Ponferradina
(First time ever)

== Relegation play-off ==
=== Qualified teams ===
Group	Position	Team
1	16th	Castillo
2	16th	Amurrio
3	16th	Huesca
4	16th	Baza

=== Matches ===
The two losers of this tournament will play another tie, which will decide the team that will be relegated to the 2006-07 Tercera División.

==== Semifinals ====
Team 1	Agg.	Team 2	1st leg	2nd leg
Baza	2–2 (3–5 p)	Amurrio	1–1	1–1
Huesca	1–1 (a)	Castillo	0–0	1–1

==== Final ====
Team 1	Agg.	Team 2	1st leg	2nd leg
Castillo	0–3	Baza	0–1	0–2

Relegated to Tercera División
Castillo
