= Zigor Goikuria =

Spanish footballer

Zigor
Personal information
- Full name: Zigor Goikuria Garmendia
- Date of birth: 16 June 1979 (age 47)
- Place of birth: Arrigorriaga, Spain
- Height: 1.87 m (6 ft 1 1/2 in)
- Position: Goalkeeper

Youth career
- Padura

Senior career*
Years	Team	Apps	(Gls)
1998–2001	Padura		
2001–2002	Amorebieta		
2002–2006	Lemona	73	(0)
2006–2008	Écija	46	(0)
2007	→ Eibar (loan)	19	(0)
2008–2012	Eibar	57	(0)
2012–2013	Amorebieta	2	(0)
2013–2015	Zalla	68	(0)
2015–2016	Padura		
- * Club domestic league appearances and goals

Zigor Goikuria Garmendia (born 16 June 1979), known simply as Zigor, is a Spanish former footballer who played as a goalkeeper.

== Club career ==
Zigor was born in Arrigorriaga, Biscay. His career was spent almost exclusively in the Segunda División B, where he represented SD Lemona, Écija Balompié, SD Eibar and SD Amorebieta.

In 2008–09, whilst with the third club, Zigor was first-choice (34 out of 42 league games) in the Segunda División, but the Basques suffered relegation after ranking in 21st position. On 8 November 2008, he collided with Real Sociedad player Iñigo Díaz de Cerio during a league match, with the striker going on to miss the rest of the season after fracturing the tibia and fibula in his right leg.
