= Ciudad Deportiva del Real Valladolid =

Training ground of Real Valladolid

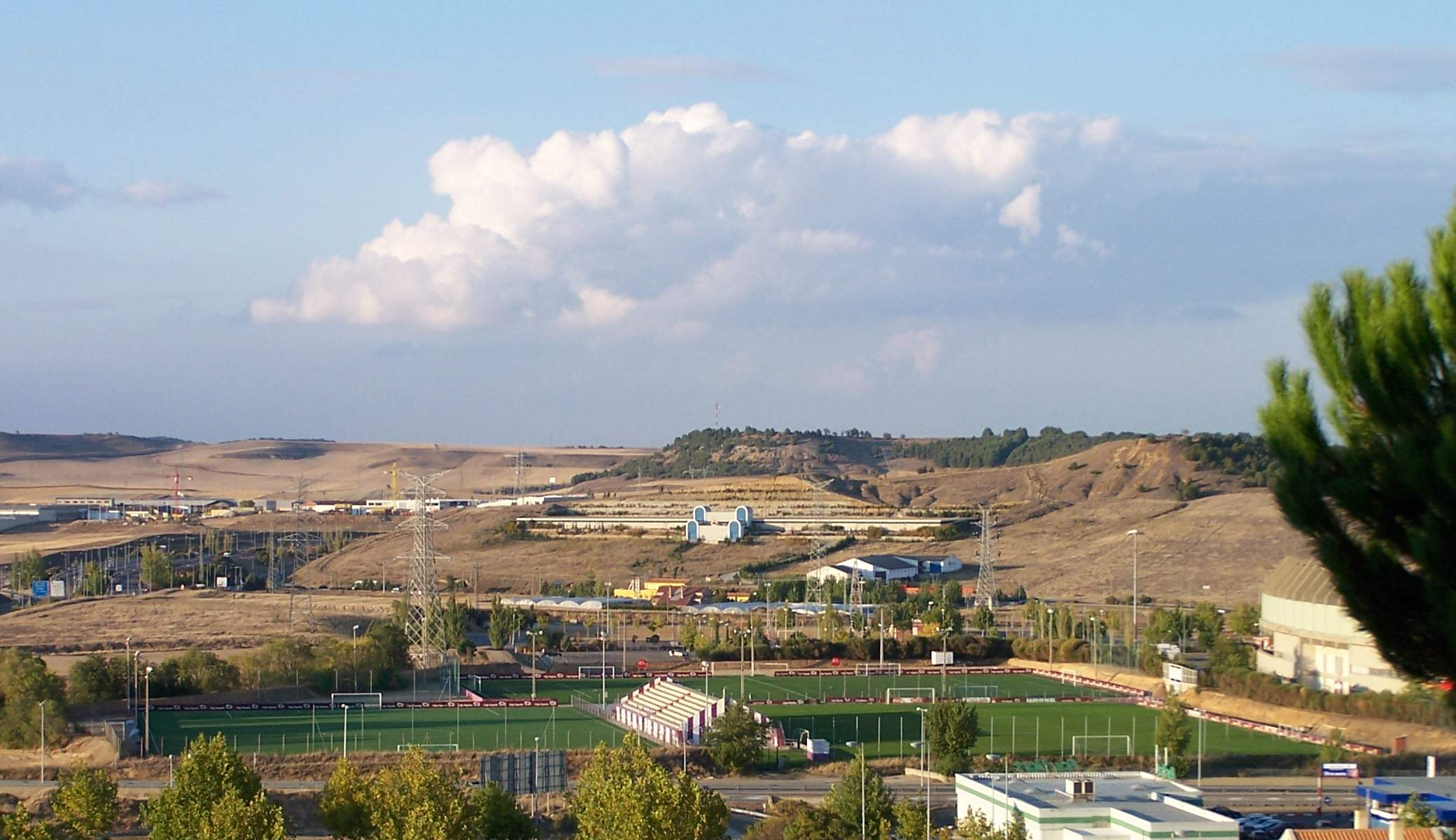
- Interactive map of Ciudad Deportiva del Real Valladolid
- Location: Valladolid; Castile and León, Spain
- Coordinates: 41°38′40″N 04°45′48″W
- Owner: Real Valladolid
- Capacity: 1500
- Type: Football training ground

Construction
- Opened: 1988

Tenant
- Real Valladolid (training) (1988-)

Website
- Ciudad Deportiva del Real Valladolid

The Ciudad Deportiva del Real Valladolid, commonly known as Campos Anexos al Estadio José Zorrilla, is the training ground and academy base of the Spanish football club Real Valladolid. It was opened in 1988.

Located few metres west of the Estadio José Zorrilla, it is used for youth and senior teams trainings.

== Facilities ==
- Central Stadium with a capacity of 1500 seats, is the home stadium of Real Valladolid Promesas, the reserve team of Real Valladolid.
- 2 artificial pitches.
- Service centre with gymnasium.

== Links ==
- Estadios de España (in English)
