= Sabino (footballer, born 1978) =

Spanish footballer (born 1978)

Sabino Sánchez Parra (born 14 February 1978) is a Spanish football manager and former footballer who last managed La Estrella.

== Club career ==
Sabino has been described as a "legendary player from Los Santos de Maimona" and has played in the Spanish La Liga with Osasuna.

== International career ==
Sabino played for the Extremadura autonomous football team.

== Post-playing career ==
After retiring from professional football, Sabino worked as a sports counselor in Los Santos de Maimona, Spain.

== Managerial career ==
Sabino managed Spanish side La Estrella, helping the club earn promotion.

== Personal life ==
Sabino has been married and has a daughter.
