= Universidad de Las Palmas CF =

Universidad Las Palmas
- Full name: Universidad de Las Palmas; Club de Fútbol
- Nicknames: La U (The U); Uni
- Founded: 1994
- Dissolved: 2011
- Ground: Pepe Gonçalvez; Las Palmas, Canary Islands, Spain
- Capacity: 3,000
- League: None
- 2010–11: 2ªB - Group 1, 5th
Home colours	Away colours

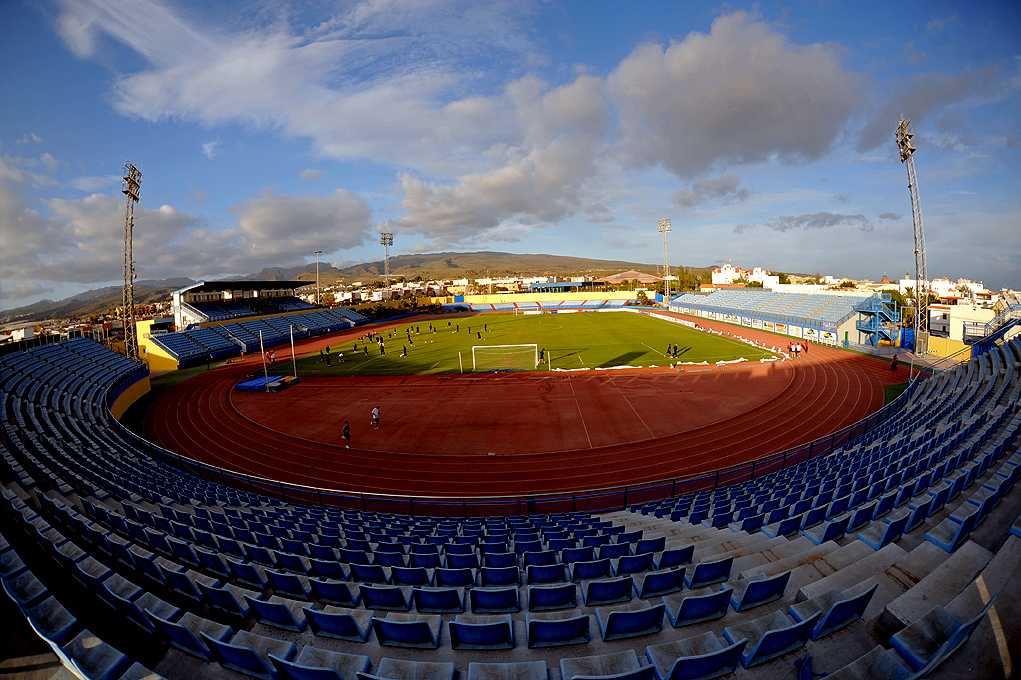
Estadio Municipal de Maspalomas, where the club played during its season in Segunda División.

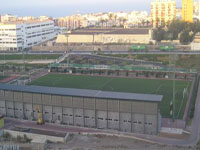
Estadio Alfonso Silva

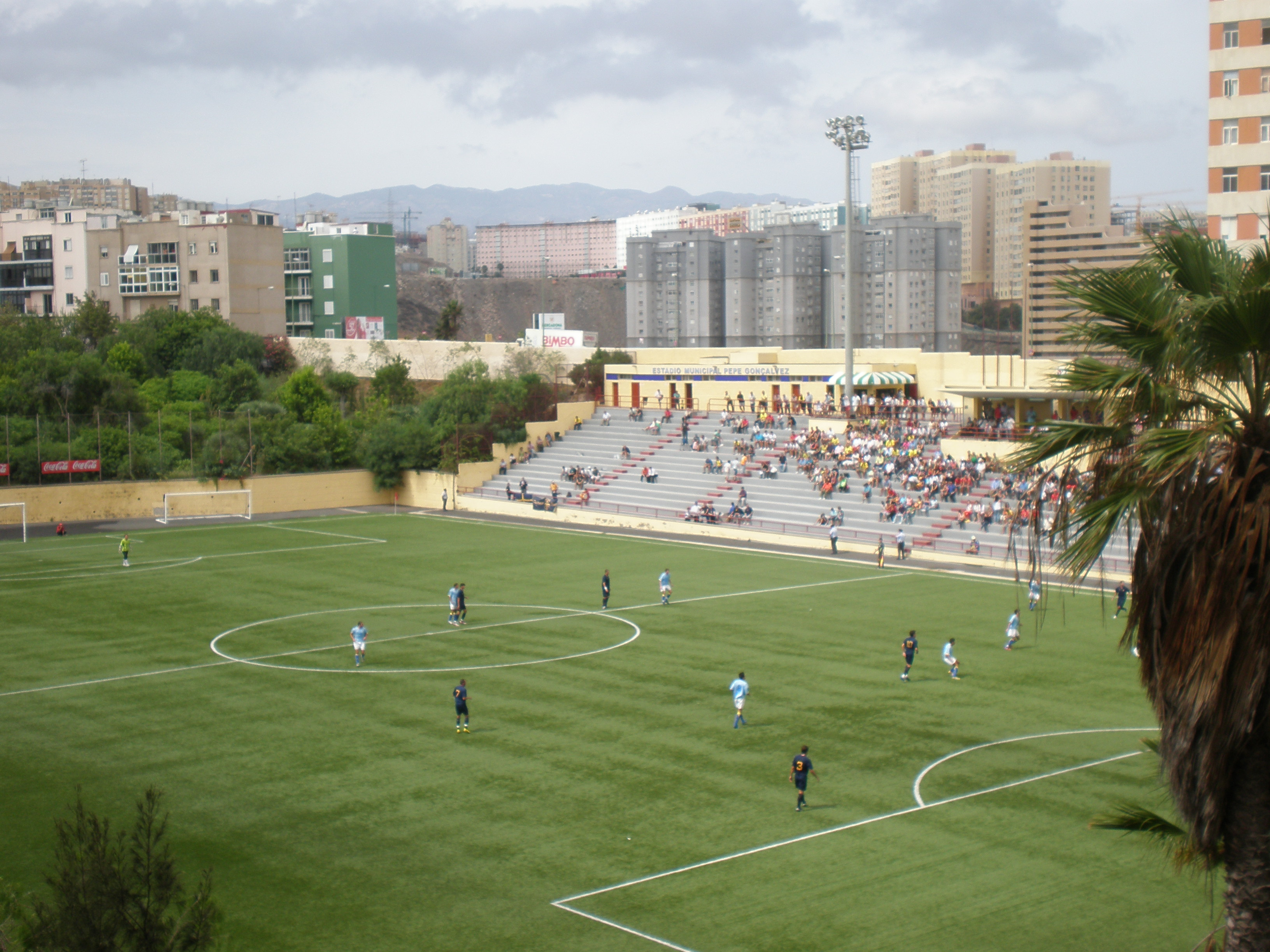
Pepe Gonçalvez, club's ground from 2007 to 2011.

Universidad de Las Palmas de Gran Canaria Club de Fútbol was a Spanish football team based in Las Palmas de Gran Canaria, in the Canary Islands. Founded in 1994 as Vegueta-Universidad, it was dissolved in 2011 due to insurmountable economic problems.

It acted as the club of University of Las Palmas de Gran Canaria.

== History ==
Universidad was founded in 1994, following interactions between lawyers and college students. It first began playing amateur football, under the name Vegueta-Universidad, only appearing in Tercera División in 1997–98.

After two promotions in only two years, the club played in the second level in 2000–01, being relegated immediately. During the campaign, Universidad played at Maspalomas, as its grounds were only artificial then, and neighbours UD Las Palmas did not wish to share its Estadio Insular.

Subsequently, Universidad played as feeder club to Unión Deportiva, after one of its founders and then chairman, Alfredo Morales, decided to merge after being installed into the latter's board of directors. It only lasted one season, as Francisco Gómez Cáceres returned (after being ousted by Morales) and rendered the club again independent, as it subsequently competed solely in the third division; in 2007, the club moved from the 2,000-seat Estadio Alfonso Silva to the Estadio Pepe Gonçalvez.

At the end of the 2010–11 season, Universidad was relegated to the fourth level for failing to pay its players. On 7 July 2011, the club was dissolved due to its enormous debts.

== Honours ==
- Tercera División

Winners (1): 1997–98

- Teide Trophy

Winners (1): 2000

== Season to season ==
Season	Tier	Division	Place	Copa del Rey
1994–95	7	2ª Reg.	1st	
1995–96	6	1ª Reg.	1st	
1996–97	5	Int. Pref.	1st	
1997–98	4	3ª	1st	
1998–99	3	2ª B	2nd	
1999–2000	3	2ª B	1st	
2000–01	2	2ª	20th	
2001–02	3	2ª B	4th	
2002–03	3	2ª B	1st	

Season	Tier	Division	Place	Copa del Rey
2003–04	3	2ª B	10th	
2004–05	3	2ª B	2nd	
2005–06	3	2ª B	1st	
2006–07	3	2ª B	4th	
2007–08	3	2ª B	6th	
2008–09	3	2ª B	12th	
2009–10	3	2ª B	4th	
2010–11	3	2ª B	5th	Round of 32

- 1 season in Segunda División
- 12 seasons in Segunda División B
- 1 season in Tercera División

== See also ==
- Universidad de Las Palmas CF B, reserve team.
