= 2008–09 Copa del Rey =

107th Copa del Rey

Tournament details
- Country: Spain
- Teams: 83

Final positions
- Champions: Barcelona (25th title)
- Runners-up: Athletic Bilbao

Tournament statistics
- Top goal scorer(s): Lionel Messi; Luis Fabiano (6 goals each)

The 2008–09 Copa del Rey was the 107th staging of the Copa del Rey (including two seasons where two rival editions were played). The competition started on 23 August 2008 and concluded on 13 May 2009 with the final, held at the Mestalla Stadium in Valencia, in which Barcelona lifted the trophy for the record-extending 25th time in their history with a 4–1 victory over Athletic Bilbao, who qualified for the third qualifying round of the 2009–10 UEFA Europa League. The defending cup holders were Valencia, but they were eliminated in the quarter-finals.

== Qualified teams ==
The following teams competed in the 2008–09 Copa del Rey:

20 teams of 2007–08 La Liga:

- Almería
- Athletic Bilbao
- Atlético Madrid
- Barcelona
- Betis
- Deportivo
- Espanyol
- Getafe
- Levante
- Mallorca
- Real Murcia
- Osasuna
- Racing Santander
- Real Madrid
- Recreativo
- Sevilla
- Valencia
- Valladolid
- Villarreal
- Zaragoza

21 teams of 2007–08 Segunda División (Sevilla Atlético are excluded for being a reserve team of Sevilla):

- Alavés
- Albacete
- Cádiz
- Castellón
- Celta Vigo
- Córdoba
- Eibar
- Elche
- Gimnàstic
- Granada 74
- Hércules
- Las Palmas
- Málaga
- Numancia
- Poli Ejido
- Racing Ferrol
- Real Sociedad
- Salamanca
- Sporting de Gijón
- Tenerife
- Xerez

24 teams of 2007–08 Segunda División B. Teams that qualified are the top five teams of each of the 4 groups (excluding reserve teams) and the four with the highest number of points out of the remaining non-reserve teams (*):

- Pontevedra
- Rayo Vallecano
- Fuerteventura
- Lugo
- Universidad LPGC
- Ponferradina
- Huesca
- Zamora
- Barakaldo
- Real Unión
- Girona
- Melilla*
- Gavà
- Alicante
- Benidorm
- Orihuela
- Écija
- Ceuta
- Linares
- Mérida
- Granada
- Conquense*
- Lemona*
- Águilas*

18 teams of Tercera División 2007–08. Teams that qualified are the champions of each of the 18 groups (or at least the ones with the highest number of points within their group since reserve teams are excluded):

- Ciudad de Santiago
- Real Oviedo
- Gimnástica
- Portugalete
- Sant Andreu
- Alzira
- Ciempozuelos
- Mirandés
- Roquetas
- San Fernando
- Atlético Baleares
- Atlético Granadilla
- Atlético Ciudad
- Don Benito
- Izarra
- Alfaro
- Ejea
- Toledo

== First round ==
The matches were played on 23, 25, 26, 27 and 28 August 2008.

Team 1	Score	Team 2
Real Oviedo	2–0	Pontevedra
Ponferradina	1–0 (aet)	Racing Ferrol
San Fernando	0–3	Poli Ejido
Conquense	3–2 (aet)	Cádiz
Izarra	0–1	Gavà
Universidad LPGC	1–0	Ciempozuelos
Orihuela	2–0	Atlético Baleares
Linares	1–2	Écija
Ciudad Santiago	0–1	Portugalete
Melilla	2–1 (aet)	Ceuta
Toledo	3–1	Granada
Barakaldo	2–0	Gimnástica de Torrelavega
Roquetas	1–0	Atlético Ciudad
Ejea	1–3 (aet)	Alzira
Alfaro	1–0 (aet)	Águilas
Atlético Granadilla	0–1 (aet)	Don Benito
Lugo	0–3	Real Unión
Sant Andreu	2–1 (aet)	Mirandés

23 August 2008

Real Oviedo	2–0	Pontevedra
Curro 49' (pen.); Basualdo 81' (o.g.)

Carlos Tartiere, Oviedo
25 August 2008

Ponferradina	1–0 (a.e.t.)	Racing Ferrol
De Paula 93'

El Toralín, Ponferrada
25 August 2008

San Fernando	0–3	Poli Ejido
		Molina 8'; Nakor 45'; Laget 78'

Bahía Sur, San Fernando
25 August 2008

Conquense	3–2 (a.e.t.)	Cádiz
Beñat 78'; Martins 104', 106'		Juanma 35'; Enrique 103'

La Fuensanta, Cuenca
26 August 2008

Izarra	0–1	Gavà
		Keko 88'

Merkatondoa, Estella
27 August 2008

Universidad de Las Palmas	1–0	Ciempozuelos
Álamo 78'

Municipal Pepe Gonçálvez, Las Palmas de Gran Canaria
Attendance: 200
Referee: García Cabrera
27 August 2008

Orihuela	2–0	Atlético Baleares
Espadas 18'; Tevenet 57'

Los Arcos, Orihuela
27 August 2008

Linares	1–2	Écija
Ángel 9'		Fernando 22'; Migue 72'

Linarejos, Linares
Attendance: 2,000
27 August 2008

Ciudad de Santiago	0–1	Portugalete
		Asensio 19'

Multiusos de San Lázaro, Santiago de Compostela
27 August 2008

Melilla	2–1 (a.e.t.)	Ceuta
Ramos 47'; Migui 94'		Anxo 50'

Municipal Álvarez Claro, Melilla
27 August 2008

Toledo	3–1	Granada
Velasco 36' (pen.); Intxausti 67'; Butra 74'		Altuna 19'

Salto del Caballo, Toledo
27 August 2008

Barakaldo	2–0	Gimnástica
Alonso 10'; Rubio 71'

Nuevo Lasesarre, Barakaldo
28 August 2008

Roquetas	1–0	Atlético Ciudad
Herrera 80'

Antonio Peroles, Roquetas de Mar
28 August 2008

Ejea	1–3 (a.e.t.)	Alzira
Gómez 73'		Ramos 65'; López 95'; Madrigal 120'

Luchán, Ejea de los Caballeros
28 August 2008

Alfaro	1–0 (a.e.t.)	Águilas
Gurría 120+2'

La Molineta, Alfaro
Attendance: 700
Referee: Istúriz Latorre
28 August 2008

Atlético Granadilla	0–1 (a.e.t.)	Don Benito
		Valladar 114'

Francisco Suárez, Granadilla de Abona
28 August 2008

Lugo	0–3	Real Unión
		Goikoetxea 15'; Romo 42' (pen.); Abasolo 53'

Anxo Carro, Lugo
28 August 2008

Sant Andreu	2–1 (a.e.t.)	Mirandés
Besora 60'; Eloi 107'		Espinosa 76'

Narcís Sala, Barcelona

== Second round ==
The matches were played on 3, 4 and 11 September 2008. Albacete received a bye.

Team 1	Score	Team 2
Real Sociedad	1–0	Zaragoza
Huesca	1–3 (aet)	Rayo Vallecano
Real Oviedo	2–3 (aet)	Ponferradina
Real Unión	2–1	Sant Andreu
Orihuela	1–0	Fuerteventura
Toledo	1–0	Zamora
Barakaldo	1–0 (aet)	Roquetas
Salamanca	2–1	Las Palmas
Alzira	0–0 (1–4 p)	Granada 74
Alfaro	1–2	Don Benito
Benidorm	4–2 (aet)	Lemona
Castellón	1–0	Eibar
Elche	2–0	Alavés
Gimnàstic	0–2	Girona
Xerez	1–1 (1–3 p)	Real Murcia
Tenerife	2–1	Córdoba
Hércules	2–1 (aet)	Levante
Poli Ejido	2–0	Conquense
Écija	0–1	Portugalete
Melilla	5–2	Mérida
Alicante	0–1	Celta Vigo
Gavà	1–3 (aet)	Universidad de Las Palmas

3 September 2008

Real Sociedad	1–0	Zaragoza
Marcos 47'

Anoeta, San Sebastián
Attendance: 16,494
Referee: José Antonio Teixeira Vitienes
3 September 2008

Huesca	1–3 (a.e.t.)	Rayo Vallecano
Castro 61' (pen.)		Coke 90'; Pachón 104', 107'

El Alcoraz, Huesca
3 September 2008

Real Oviedo	2–3 (a.e.t.)	Ponferradina
Cervero 84'; Curro 115'		Portilla 63', 118'; Prieto 93' (o.g.)

Carlos Tartiere, Oviedo
Attendance: 6,000
3 September 2008

Real Unión	2–1	Sant Andreu
Goikoetxea 20'; Larraínzar 68'		Lanzarote 55'

Stadium Gal, Irún
Attendance: 800
Referee: Ainzúa Zabalza
3 September 2008

Orihuela	1–0	Fuerteventura
Villa 82' (pen.)

Los Arcos, Orihuela
3 September 2008

Toledo	1–0	Zamora
Joaqui 26'

Salto del Caballo, Toledo
3 September 2008

Barakaldo	1–0 (a.e.t.)	Roquetas
Izeta 104'

Nuevo Lasesarre, Barakaldo
3 September 2008

Salamanca	2–1	Las Palmas
Toti 31'; Miku 47'		González 6'

El Helmántico, Villares de la Reina
3 September 2008

Alzira	0–0 (a.e.t.)	Granada 74
Penalties
Cabarcos (penalty scored); Heras (penalty missed); Robles (penalty missed)	1–4	(penalty scored) Nené; (penalty scored) Pérez; (penalty scored) Thierry; (penalty scored) Nino

Luis Suñer Picó, Alzira
Attendance: 1,000
Referee: Simón del Pino
3 September 2008

Alfaro	1–2	Don Benito
Asurmendi 19'		Serrano 45' 64'

La Molineta, Alfaro
3 September 2008

Benidorm	4–2 (a.e.t.)	Lemona
Paixão 35', 89'; Luismi 104'; Ruano 108' (pen.)		Ramírez 14' (pen.); Arroyo 71' (pen.)

Municipal de Foietes, Benidorm
Attendance: 800
Referee: Gómez Liarte
3 September 2008

Castellón	1–0	Eibar
Pampín 77' (o.g.)

Castalia, Castellón
3 September 2008

Elche	2–0	Alavés
D. Fuster 6'; Dani 70'

Martínez Valero, Elche
3 September 2008

Gimnàstic	0–2	Girona
		Gabri 86', 89'

Nou Estadi, Tarragona
Attendance: 4,000
Referee: Lizondo Cortés
3 September 2008

Xerez	1–1 (a.e.t.)	Real Murcia
Francis 71'		Sikora 58'
Penalties
Calle (penalty missed); Ríos (penalty scored); Bermejo (penalty missed); Mendoza (penalty missed)	1–3	(penalty scored) Alonso; (penalty missed) Núñez; (penalty scored) Bruno; (penalty scored) Campos

Chapín, Jerez
3 September 2008

Tenerife	2–1	Córdoba
Alfaro 24' 54'		Álvarez 74'

Heliodoro Rodríguez López, Santa Cruz de Tenerife
Attendance: 6,500
Referee: del Cerro Grande
3 September 2008

Hércules	2–1 (a.e.t.)	Levante
Sendoa 48'; Tote 91'		Del Moral 29'

Rico Pérez, Alicante
3 September 2008

Poli Ejido	2–0	Conquense
Rico 42'; Nakor 86'

Municipal Santo Domingo, El Ejido
Attendance: 1,400
Referee: Juan Martínez Munuera
3 September 2008

Écija	0–1	Portugalete
		Del Olmo 65'

San Pablo, Écija
3 September 2008

Melilla	5–2	Mérida
Migui 4' 7'; Carrión 33'; López 53'; Ramos 77'		Stoeten 21'; Ismael 61'

Álvarez Claro, Melilla
4 September 2008

Alicante	0–1	Celta Vigo
		Díaz 61'

Rico Pérez, Alicante
11 September 2008

Gavà	1–3 (a.e.t.)	Universidad de Las Palmas
Badía 89'		Ariday 90+2' (pen.); Cacá 101', 111'

La Bòbila, Gavà
Attendance: 400
Referee: Vallejo Aznar

== Third round ==
The matches were played on 8 and 9 October 2008. Real Murcia received a bye.

Team 1	Score	Team 2
Portugalete	2–0	Don Benito
Real Unión	2–1	Barakaldo
Celta Vigo	2–0	Real Sociedad
Ponferradina	1–1 (4–2 p)	Universidad de Las Palmas
Orihuela	3–1	Toledo
Rayo Vallecano	2–1	Albacete
Salamanca	0–1 (aet)	Castellón
Melilla	2–3	Poli Ejido
Hércules	1–0	Girona
Granada 74	0–2	Benidorm
Elche	1–1 (4–3 p)	Tenerife

8 October 2008

Portugalete	2–0	Don Benito
Arzubiaga 30'; Gorroño 57'

La Florida, Portugalete
Referee: González Pelayo
8 October 2008

Real Unión	2–1	Barakaldo
Goikoetxea 42'; Salcedo 50'		Rebollo 12'

Stadium Gal, Irún
8 October 2008

Celta Vigo	2–0	Real Sociedad
Dinei 22', 64'

Balaídos, Vigo
Attendance: 4,000
Referee: Hevia Obras
8 October 2008

Ponferradina	1–1 (a.e.t.)	Universidad de Las Palmas
De Paula 73'		Hernández 43'
Penalties
Vega (penalty scored); Ernesto (penalty scored); Alcaide (penalty missed); Nacho (penalty scored); Borreguero (penalty scored)	4–2	(penalty scored) Pollo; (penalty scored) Álamo; (penalty missed) Beato; (penalty missed) Yebra

El Toralín, Ponferrada
Attendance: 6,000
Referee: Corral García
8 October 2008

Orihuela	3–1	Toledo
Espadas 4', 42'; Tevenet 11'		Óscar Martín 26'

Los Arcos, Orihuela
Referee: Benjumea Álvarez
8 October 2008

Rayo Vallecano	2–1	Albacete
Enguix 54'; Piti 61'		Merino 52'

Teresa Rivero, Madrid
8 October 2008

Salamanca	0–1 (a.e.t.)	Castellón
		Nsue 91'

El Helmántico, Villares de la Reina
8 October 2009

Melilla	2–3	Poli Ejido
Ramos 1'; Chota 90+3'		Torres 33'; Laget 61'; Molina 65'

Álvarez Claro, Melilla
8 October 2008

Hércules	1–0	Girona
Morán 58'

Rico Pérez, Alicante
8 October 2008

Granada 74	0–2	Benidorm
		Luismi 6'; Ruano 33'

La Victoria, Pinos Puente
9 October 2008

Elche	1–1 (a.e.t.)	Tenerife
Sicilia 91' (o.g.)		Marrero 116'
Penalties
R. Fuster (penalty scored); D. Fuster (penalty scored); Rodri (penalty missed); Acciari (penalty scored); Caballero (penalty scored)	4–3	(penalty scored) Ricardo; (penalty scored) Saizar; (penalty missed) Pérez; (penalty missed) Richi; (penalty scored) Ángel

Martínez Valero, Elche
Attendance: 1,812
Referee: Pino Zamorano

== Final phase bracket ==
Team listed first play home in the first leg.

Round of 32; 29 October 2008; 12 November 2008
Real Murcia	2	0	2
Racing Santander	1	2	3
Portugalete	1	0	1
Valencia	4	3	7
Ponferradina	1	0	1
Sevilla	0	4	4
Elche	0	0	0
Deportivo	2	2	4
Getafe	0	0	0
Osasuna	0	1	1
Athletic Bilbao	2	1	3
Recreativo	0	2	2
Numancia	0	0	0
Sporting de Gijón	1	2	3
Hércules	1	2	3
Valladolid	5	2	7
Poli Ejido	5	1	6
Villarreal	0	1	1
Celta Vigo	2	0	2
Espanyol	2	3	5
Orihuela	0	0	0
Atlético Madrid	1	0	1
Benidorm	0	0	0
Barcelona	1	1	2
Málaga	1	0	1
Mallorca	1	2	3
Rayo Vallecano	1	0	1
Almería	2	3	5
Real Unión (a)	3	3	6
Real Madrid	2	4	6
Castellón	0	0	0
Betis	2	2	4

Round of 16; 7 January 2009; 14 January 2009
Racing Santander	1	1	2
Valencia (aet)	1	3	4
Sevilla	2	3	5
Deportivo	1	0	1
Osasuna	1	0	1
Athletic Bilbao	1	2	3
Sporting de Gijón	3	1	4
Valladolid	1	2	3
Poli Ejido	3	0	3
Espanyol (a)	2	1	3
Atlético Madrid	1	1	2
Barcelona	3	2	5
Mallorca	3	1	4
Almería	1	1	2
Real Unión	0	0	0
Betis	1	1	2

Quarterfinals; 21 January 2009; 28 January 2009
Valencia	3	1	4
Sevilla (a)	2	2	4
Athletic Bilbao	0	2	2
Sporting de Gijón	0	1	1
Espanyol	0	2	2
Barcelona	0	3	3
Mallorca	1	0	1
Betis	0	0	0

Semifinals; 4 February 2009; 4 March 2009
Sevilla	2	0	2
Athletic Bilbao	1	3	4
Barcelona	2	1	3
Mallorca	0	1	1

Final; 13 May 2009
Athletic Bilbao	1
Barcelona	4

== Round of 32 ==
The first leg matches were played on 28, 29 and 30 October while the second legs were played on 11, 12 and 13 November 2008.

Team 1	Agg.	Team 2	1st leg	2nd leg
Real Unión	(a) 6–6	Real Madrid	3–2	3–4
Portugalete	1–7	Valencia	1–4	0–3
Ponferradina	1–4	Sevilla	1–0	0–4
Orihuela	0–1	Atlético Madrid	0–1	0–0
Poli Ejido	6–1	Villarreal	5–0	1–1
Hércules	3–7	Valladolid	1–5	2–2
Rayo Vallecano	1–5	Almería	1–2	0–3
Celta Vigo	2–5	RCD Espanyol	2–2	0–3
Castellón	0–4	Betis	0–2	0–2
Real Murcia	2–3	Racing Santander	2–1	0–2
Málaga	1–3	Mallorca	1–1	0–2
Athletic Bilbao	3–2	Recreativo	2–0	1–2
Getafe	0–1	Osasuna	0–0	0–1
Benidorm	0–2	Barcelona	0–1	0–1
Elche	0–4	Deportivo	0–2	0–2
Numancia	0–3	Sporting de Gijón	0–1	0–2

== Round of 16 ==
The first leg matches were played on 6, 7 and 8 January while the second legs were played on 14 and 15 January 2009.

Team 1	Agg.	Team 2	1st leg	2nd leg
Sevilla	5–1	Deportivo	2–1	3–0
Sporting de Gijón	4–3	Valladolid	3–1	1–2
Poli Ejido	3–3 (a)	RCD Espanyol	3–2	0–1
Real Unión	0–2	Betis	0–1	0–1
Mallorca	4–2	Almería	3–1	1–1
Racing Santander	2–4 (aet)	Valencia	1–1	1–3
Atlético Madrid	2–5	Barcelona	1–3	1–2
Osasuna	1–3	Athletic Bilbao	1–1	0–2

== Quarter-finals ==
Team 1	Agg.	Team 2	1st leg	2nd leg
Valencia	4–4 (a)	Sevilla	3–2	1–2
Espanyol	2–3	Barcelona	0–0	2–3
Athletic Bilbao	2–1	Sporting de Gijón	0–0	2–1
Mallorca	1–0	Betis	1–0	0–0

=== First legs ===
21 January 2009
21:00 CET

Valencia	3–2	Sevilla
Villa 6'; Baraja 83'; Mata 87'	Report	Luís Fabiano 53'; Adriano 69'

Mestalla, Valencia
Attendance: 30,000
Referee: Undiano Mallenco

21 January 2009
22:00 CET

Espanyol	0–0	Barcelona
	Report

Olímpic Lluís Companys, Barcelona
Attendance: 21,915
Referee: Muñiz Fernández

22 January 2009
20:00 CET

Athletic Bilbao	0–0	Sporting de Gijón
	Report

San Mamés, Bilbao
Attendance: 35,000
Referee: Medina Cantalejo

22 January 2009
21:00 CET

Mallorca	1–0	Betis
Keita 65'	Report

ONO Estadi, Mallorca
Attendance: 10,000
Referee: Álvarez Izquierdo

=== Second legs ===
28 January 2009
21:00 CET

Betis	0–0	Mallorca
	Report

Manuel Ruiz de Lopera, Seville
Attendance: 25,000
Referee: Pérez Lasa

Mallorca won 1–0 on aggregate.

28 January 2009
21:00 CET

Sporting de Gijón	1–2	Athletic Bilbao
Carmelo 1'	Report	Gabilondo 42'; López 51'

El Molinón, Gijón
Attendance: 18,000
Referee: González Vázquez

Athletic Bilbao won 2–1 on aggregate.

29 January 2009
20:00 CET

Sevilla	2–1	Valencia
Kanouté 36'; Squillaci 89'	Report	Marchena 8'

Ramón Sánchez Pizjuán, Seville
Attendance: 35,000
Referee: Teixeira Vitienes

Sevilla 4–4 Valencia on aggregate. Sevilla won on away goals.

29 January 2009
21:30 CET

Barcelona	3–2	Espanyol
Bojan 34', 48'; Piqué 55'	Report	Coro 58'; Callejón 68'

Camp Nou, Barcelona
Attendance: 78,443
Referee: Megía Dávila

Barcelona won 3–2 on aggregate.

== Semi-finals ==
Team 1	Agg.	Team 2	1st leg	2nd leg
Sevilla	2–4	Athletic Bilbao	2–1	0–3
Barcelona	3–1	Mallorca	2–0	1–1

=== First legs ===
4 February 2009
21:15 CET

Sevilla	2–1	Athletic Bilbao
Duscher 61'; Acosta 90+2'	Report	Llorente 42'

Ramón Sánchez Pizjuán, Seville
Attendance: 30,000
Referee: Carlos Velasco Carballo

5 February 2009
21:30 CET

Barcelona	2–0	Mallorca
Henry 35'; Márquez 73'	Report

Camp Nou, Barcelona
Attendance: 52,932
Referee: César Muñiz Fernández

=== Second legs ===
4 March 2009
20:00 CET

Athletic Bilbao	3–0	Sevilla
Martínez 4'; Llorente 34'; Toquero 37'	Report

San Mamés, Bilbao
Attendance: 39,750
Referee: Mejuto González

Athletic Bilbao won 4–2 on aggregate.

4 March 2009
22:00 CET

Mallorca	1–1	Barcelona
Castro 45'	Report	Messi 81'

ONO Estadi, Mallorca
Attendance: 14,000
Referee: Rubinos Pérez

Barcelona won 3–1 on aggregate.

== Final ==
13 May 2009
22:00 CEST

Athletic Bilbao	1–4	Barcelona
Toquero 8'	Report	Touré 32'; Messi 55'; Bojan 57'; Xavi 64'

Estadio Mestalla, Valencia
Attendance: 50,000
Referee: Luis Medina Cantalejo

== Top goalscorers ==
Goalscorers	Goals	Team
(Argentina) Lionel Messi	6	Barcelona
(Brazil) Luís Fabiano	6	Sevilla
(Spain) Jorge Molina	5	Poli Ejido
(Spain) Bojan	5	Barcelona
(France) Grégory Laget	5	Poli Ejido
(Guinea) Alhassane Keita	4	Mallorca
(Spain) David Barral	4	Sporting de Gijón
(Spain) Fernando Llorente	4	Athletic
(Spain) Iñaki Goikoetxea	4	Real Unión
