= 2010 Segunda División B play-offs =

Spanish football league play-offs

The 2010 Segunda División B play-offs (Playoffs de Ascenso or Promoción de Ascenso) were the final playoffs for promotion from 2009–10 Segunda División B to the 2010–11 Segunda División. The four first placed teams in each of the four Segunda División B groups played the Playoffs de Ascenso and the four last placed teams in Segunda División were relegated to Segunda División B. It also decided the two teams which placed 16th to be relegated to the 2010–11 Tercera División.

== Format ==
The four group winners had the opportunity to promote directly and become the overall Segunda División B champion. The four group winners were drawn into a two-legged series where the two winners promoted to the Liga Adelante and entered into the final for the Segunda División B champion. The two losing semifinalists entered the playoff round for the last two promotion spots.

The four group runners-up were drawn against one of the three fourth-placed teams outside their group while the four third-placed teams were drawn against each other in a two-legged series. The six winners advanced with the two losing semifinalists to determine the four teams that entered the last two-legged series for the last two promotion spots. In all the playoff series, the lower-ranked club played at home first. Whenever there was a tie in position (e.g. like the group winners in the semifinal round and final or the third-placed teams in the first round), a draw determined the club to play at home first.

== Group winners promotion playoff ==
=== Qualified teams ===
The draw were held in the RFEF headquarters, in Las Rozas (Madrid), on 10 May 2010, 16:30 CEST.

Group	Team
1	Ponferradina
2	Alcorcón
3	Sant Andreu
4	Granada

=== Matches ===
==== Semifinals ====
Team 1	Agg.	Team 2	1st leg	2nd leg
Sant Andreu	1–1 (8–9 p)	Ponferradina	0–1	1–0
Granada	2–1	Alcorcón	2–0	0–1

The aggregate winners will be promoted and qualified to the 2010–11 Segunda División B Final. The aggregate losers will be relegated to the Non-champions promotion play-off Second Round.

===== First leg =====
16 May 2010	Sant Andreu	0 – 1	Ponferradina	Barcelona
12:00 CEST		(Report)	70' Valle	Stadium: Narcís Sala; Referee: Pedro Sureda Cuenca

16 May 2010	Granada	2 – 0	Alcorcón	Granada
17:00 CEST	Ighalo 72'; Amaya 75'	(Report)		Stadium: Nuevo Los Cármenes; Referee: Carlos López López

===== Second leg =====
23 May 2010	Alcorcón	1 – 0 (1–2 agg.)	Granada	Alcorcón (Madrid)
19:00 CEST	López 41'	(Report)		Stadium: Santo Domingo; Referee: Daniel Ocón Arráiz

23 May 2010	Ponferradina	0 – 1 (a.e.t.) (1–1 agg.) (9 – 8 p)	Sant Andreu	Ponferrada (León)
20:00 CEST		(Report)	82' Amarilla	Stadium: El Toralín; Referee: Pablo González Fuertes
	Penalties
	Ruiz (penalty scored); Vega (penalty scored); Salas (penalty scored); Jano (penalty scored); Gerardo (penalty scored); Mandi (penalty scored); Nacho (penalty scored); Alcaide (penalty scored); Candela (penalty scored)		(penalty scored) Bueno; (penalty scored) Miguélez; (penalty scored) Aláez; (penalty scored) Keko; (penalty scored) Lanzarote; (penalty scored) Martí; (penalty scored) Amarilla; (penalty scored) Mayordomo; (penalty missed) Tarradellas

Promoted to Segunda División
Granada (22 years later)	Ponferradina (3 years later)

==== Final ====
Team 1	Agg.	Team 2	1st leg	2nd leg
Ponferradina	0–1	Granada	0–1	0–0

===== First leg =====
30 May 2010	Ponferradina	0 – 1	Granada	Ponferrada (León)
20:00 CEST		(Report)	84' Berrocal	Stadium: El Toralín; Attendance: 5,500; Referee: Ignacio Iglesias Villanueva

===== Second leg =====
6 June 2010	Granada	0 – 0 (1–0 agg.)	Ponferradina	Granada
20:00 CEST		(Report)		Stadium: Nuevo Los Cármenes; Attendance: 7,000; Referee: Ricardo de Burgos Bengoetxea

Segunda División B
2009–10 Winners
Granada

== Non-champions promotion play-off ==
=== First round ===
==== Qualified teams ====
Group	Position	Team
1	2nd	Eibar
2	2nd	Oviedo
3	2nd	Barcelona B
4	2nd	Melilla
1	3rd	Palencia
2	3rd	Guadalajara
3	3rd	Ontinyent
4	3rd	Real Jaén
1	4th	Pontevedra
2	4th	Universidad LPGC
3	4th	Alcoyano
4	4th	Poli Ejido

==== Matches ====
Team 1	Agg.	Team 2	1st leg	2nd leg
Pontevedra	4–2	Oviedo	2–1	2–1
Real Jaén	3–2	Palencia	1–1	2–1
Universidad LPGC	4–0	UD Melilla	1–0	3–0
Alcoyano	0–2	Eibar	0–0	0–2
Ontinyent	5–1	Guadalajara	2–0	3–1
Poli Ejido	4–4 (a)	Barcelona B	3–3	1–1

===== First leg =====
15 May 2010	Pontevedra	2 – 1	Oviedo	Pontevedra
20:00 CEST	Espadas 7'; Igor 70'	(Report)	51' Perona	Stadium: Pasarón; Referee: Alberto Díaz Arias

15 May 2010	Real Jaén	1 – 1	Palencia	Jaén
21:00 CEST	Esparza 65' (pen.)	(Report)	70' De Paula	Stadium: Nuevo La Victoria; Referee: Juan Manuel Bernal Moreno

16 May 2010	Universidad LPGC	1 – 0	Melilla	Las Palmas de Gran Canaria
12:00 CEST; 11:00 Local time	Ruiz 48' (o.g.)	(Report)		Stadium: Pepe Gonçalvez; Referee: Alonso Vizuete Sánchez

16 May 2010	Alcoyano	0 – 0	Eibar	Alcoi (Alicante)
17:00 CEST		(Report)		Stadium: El Collao; Referee: Óscar Herrero Arenas

16 May 2010	Ontinyent	2 – 0	Guadalajara	Ontinyent (Valencia)
17:00 CEST	Montañés 35'; Centella 57'	(Report)		Stadium: El Clariano; Referee: David Medie Jiménez

16 May 2010	Poli Ejido	3 – 3	Barcelona B	El Ejido (Almería)
21:00 CEST	Cañadas 57'; Sánchez 75'; Pichardo 88'	(Report)	44', 64', 82' Benja	Stadium: Santo Domingo; Referee: Diego Sebastián López Martínez

===== Second leg =====
22 May 2010	Barcelona B	1 – 1 (4a–4 agg.)	Poli Ejido	Barcelona
18:00 CEST	Soriano 49' (pen.)	(Report)	71' Regal	Stadium: Mini Estadi; Referee: Íker Berjano Ariztegui

23 May 2010	Melilla	0 – 3 (0–4 agg.)	Universidad LPGC	Melilla
18:00 CEST		(Report)	49' Futre; 70' Sánchez; 81' Vega	Stadium: Álvarez Claro; Referee: Jacob Yáñez Megías

23 May 2010	Palencia	1 – 2 (a.e.t.) (2–3 agg.)	Real Jaén	Palencia
18:00 CEST	Suárez 63'	(Report)	71' Castellanos; 106' Solabarrieta	Stadium: Nueva Balastera; Referee: Miguel Sánchez-Seco Otero

23 May 2010	Oviedo	1 – 2 (2–4 agg.)	Pontevedra	Oviedo
19:00 CEST	Perona 82'	(Report)	51', 89' Igor	Stadium: Nuevo Carlos Tartiere; Referee: Luis López Muñoz

23 May 2010	Guadalajara	1 – 3 (1–5 agg.)	Ontinyent	Guadalajara
19:00 CEST	Arroyo 67'	(Report)	39' Centella; 60' Rubio; 83' Collado	Stadium: Pedro Escartín; Referee: Rubén Gómez González

23 May 2010	Eibar	2 – 0 (2–0 agg.)	Alcoyano	Eibar (Guipúzcoa)
19:30 CEST	Urcelai 11' (pen.); Sutil 89'	(Report)		Stadium: Ipurúa; Referee: Enrique Ortiz Blanco

=== Second round ===
==== Qualified teams ====
Group	Position	Team	Notes
2	1st	Alcorcón	Relegated from Group Winners promotion play-off
3	1st	Sant Andreu	Relegated from Group Winners promotion play-off
1	4th	Pontevedra	
4	3rd	Real Jaén	
2	4th	Universidad LPGC	
1	2nd	Eibar	
3	3rd	Ontinyent	
3	2nd	Barcelona B	

==== Matches ====
Team 1	Agg.	Team 2	1st leg	2nd leg
Universidad LPGC	2–4	Sant Andreu	0–2	2–2
Ontinyent	3–1	Eibar	2–1	1–0
Pontevedra	0–3	Alcorcón	0–0	0–3
Real Jaén	0–3	Barcelona B	0–0	0–3

===== First leg =====
30 May 2010	Universidad LPGC	0 – 2	Sant Andreu	Las Palmas de Gran Canaria
12:10 CEST; 11:10 Local time		(Report)	42' Máyor; 87' Miguélez	Stadium: Pepe Gonçalvez; Referee: Eduardo Prieto Iglesias

30 May 2010	Pontevedra	0 – 0	Alcorcón	Pontevedra
19:00 CEST		(Report)		Stadium: Pasarón; Referee: Jorge Valdés Aller

30 May 2010	Ontinyent	2 – 1	Eibar	Ontinyent (Valencia)
19:00 CEST	Montañés 62'; Matas 89'	(Report)	70' Gómez	Stadium: El Clariano; Referee: Sergio Usón Rosel

30 May 2010	Real Jaén	0 – 0	Barcelona B	Jaén
20:00 CEST		(Report)		Stadium: Nuevo La Victoria; Referee: Juan Francisco García Cabrera

===== Second leg =====
5 June 2010	Barcelona B	3 – 0 (3–0 agg.)	Real Jaén	Barcelona
20:00 CEST	Thiago 19'; Soriano 58', 68'	(Report)		Stadium: Mini Estadi; Referee: Juan Martínez Munuera

6 June 2010	Sant Andreu	2 – 2 (4–2 agg.)	Universidad LPGC	Barcelona
18:30 CEST	Miguélez 37'; Moyano 63'	(Report)	40' Marrero; 75' Sánchez	Stadium: Narcís Sala; Referee: Valentín Pizarro Gómez

6 June 2010	Eibar	0 – 1 (1–3 agg.)	Ontinyent	Eibar (Guipúzcoa)
19:30 CEST		(Report)	85' Montañés	Stadium: Ipurúa; Referee: Pablo Fernández Pérez

6 June 2010	Alcorcón	3 – 0 (3–0 agg.)	Pontevedra	Alcorcón (Madrid)
20:00 CEST	Mora 32' (pen.), 44'; Vara 88'	(Report)		Stadium: Santo Domingo; Referee: Jorge Figueroa Vázquez

=== Third round ===
==== Qualified teams ====
Group	Position	Team
3	1st	Sant Andreu
3	3rd	Ontinyent
2	1st	Alcorcón
3	2nd	Barcelona B

==== Matches ====
Team 1	Agg.	Team 2	1st leg	2nd leg
Barcelona B	1–0	Sant Andreu	1–0	0–0
Ontinyent	3–4	Alcorcón	1–1	2–3

===== First leg =====
13 June 2010	Barcelona B	1 – 0	Sant Andreu	Barcelona
20:00 CEST	Soriano 88' (pen.)	(Report)		Stadium: Mini Estadi; Referee: Heriberto Ramos Rodríguez

13 June 2010	Ontinyent	1 – 1	Alcorcón	Ontinyent (Valencia)
20:30 CEST	Centella 55'	(Report)	80' Pérez	Stadium: El Clariano; Referee: Israel Simón del Pino

===== Second leg =====
20 June 2010	Sant Andreu	0 – 0 (0–1 agg.)	Barcelona B	Barcelona
18:00 CEST		(Report)		Stadium: Narcís Sala; Referee: Francisco Manuel Arias López

20 June 2010	Alcorcón	3 – 2 (4–3 agg.)	Ontinyent	Alcorcón (Madrid)
20:00 CEST	López 63', 89'; Cascón 75'	(Report)	24' Moreno; 37' Muñoz	Stadium: Santo Domingo; Referee: Fernando López Acera

Promoted to Segunda División
Barcelona B (11 years later)	Alcorcón (First time ever)

== Relegation play-off ==
=== Qualified teams ===
Group	Team
1	Guijuelo
2	Toledo
3	Espanyol B
4	Roquetas

=== Matches ===
Team 1	Agg.	Team 2	1st leg	2nd leg
Espanyol B	2–3	Guijuelo	2–2	0–1
Roquetas	2–1	Toledo	1–0	1–1

The aggregate losers will be relegated to Tercera División.

==== First leg ====
16 May 2010	Espanyol B	2 – 2	Guijuelo	Sant Adrià de Besòs (Barcelona)
12:00 CEST	Tai 21'; Luismi 63'	(Report)	67' (pen.) Iturralde; 86' Ubis	Stadium: Sant Adrià; Referee: Gorka Sagues Oscoz

16 May 2010	Roquetas	1 – 0	Toledo	Roquetas de Mar (Almería)
12:00 CEST	Zaldívar 25' (o.g.)	(Report)		Stadium: Antonio Peroles; Referee: Carlos Sánchez Laso

==== Second leg ====
22 May 2010	Guijuelo	1 – 0 (3–2 agg.)	Espanyol B	Guijuelo (Salamanca)
18:00 CEST	Joselito 89'	(Report)		Stadium: Municipal de Guijuelo; Referee: Dámaso Arcediano Monescillo

23 May 2010	Toledo	1 – 1 (1–2 agg.)	Roquetas	Toledo
19:00 CEST	Segovia 1'	(Report)	90+1' Ibáñez	Stadium: Salto del Caballo; Referee: Iñaki Bikandi Garrido

Relegated to Tercera División
Espanyol B	Toledo

== See also ==
- 2010 Tercera División play-offs
