= Eneko Romo =

Spanish footballer

Personal information
- Full name: Eneko Romo Arangoa
- Date of birth: 19 January 1979 (age 47)
- Place of birth: Pamplona, Spain
- Height: 1.82 m (5 ft 11 1/2 in)
- Position: Midfielder

Youth career
- 1994–1995: Pamplona
- 1995–1997: Athletic Bilbao

Senior career*
Years	Team	Apps	(Gls)
1997–1998	Basconia	31	(2)
1998–2000	Bilbao Athletic	33	(1)
2000–2004	Alavés B	98	(34)
2002–2003	→ Eibar (loan)	26	(4)
2003–2004	Alavés	4	(0)
2005	Rayo Vallecano	17	(2)
2006	Lleida	22	(0)
2006–2007	Eibar	34	(9)
2007–2012	Real Unión	152	(33)
2012–2013	Peña Sport	36	(11)
2013–2016	Real Unión	85	(18)
Total		538	(114)

Managerial career
- 2019: Real Unión (caretaker)
- * Club domestic league appearances and goals

Eneko Romo Arangoa (born 19 January 1979) is a Spanish former professional footballer who played as a midfielder.

== Playing career ==
Born in Pamplona, Navarre, Romo began his development at CD Pamplona and played his first years of senior football with the reserve teams of Athletic Bilbao and Deportivo Alavés in the Segunda División B. In 2002–03, he was loaned to another club from the Basque Country, SD Eibar, and helped them stay in the Segunda División on the last day of the season.

In January 2005, having not broken into an Alavés side that wanted to get rid of him, Romo left for Rayo Vallecano and later represented UE Lleida before making his way back to third-tier Eibar in 2006. He was their top scorer in his only season, with nine goals over the regular campaign and one more in a playoff victory over Rayo.

Romo spent most of the remaining decade of his career with Real Unión, with only the 2009–10 season above the third division; he totalled 263 games for the team from Irun. On 11 November 2008, away to Real Madrid in the last 32 of the Copa del Rey, he score a last-minute header against Jerzy Dudek to level the tie 6–6 on aggregate as his side advanced on the away goals rule.

== Coaching career ==
On 24 March 2019, sporting director Romo was caretaker manager of Real Unión for a goalless draw at Racing de Santander, after the dismissal of Juan Domínguez.

== Honours ==
Basconia

- Tercera División: 1997–98

Eibar

- Segunda División B: 2006–07
