= Miguélez =

Miguélez is a family name, which originated as a patronymic surname, meaning "son of Miguel" (Michael).

Notable people with the surname include:

- Dani Miguélez (born 1985), Spanish director of photography
- David Miguélez (born 1981), Spanish footballer
- Irene Miguélez (born 2004), Spanish footballer
- Paulino Miguélez (born 1999), Spanish footballer
- Rosa Miguélez (born 1953), Spanish politician
