= Santi Villa =

Spanish footballer

Personal information
- Full name: Santiago Villa Castro
- Date of birth: 5 August 1982 (age 44)
- Place of birth: Linares, Spain
- Height: 1.80 m (5 ft 11 in)
- Position: Winger

Youth career
- 1999–2001: Linense

Senior career*
Years	Team	Apps	(Gls)
2001	Linense	2	(0)
2001–2002	Atlético Madrid C	1	(0)
2002–2003	Logroñés		
2002	→ San Marcial (loan)		
2003	→ Corralejo (loan)	9	(0)
2003	Calahorra	10	(0)
2004	Quintanar Rey	17	(2)
2004–2005	Granada	26	(2)
2005–2006	Murcia B		
2006–2007	Torrevieja	36	(9)
2007–2008	Ontinyent	37	(10)
2008–2009	Orihuela	36	(9)
2009	Pontevedra	11	(1)
2010	Atlético Ciudad	15	(0)
2010–2011	Badalona	40	(5)
2011–2012	Cacereño	33	(8)
2012–2017	Jaén	163	(31)
2017–2020	Mérida	97	(21)
2021–2023	Villafranca	52	(7)
- * Club domestic league appearances and goals

Santiago 'Santi' Villa Castro (born 5 August 1982) is a Spanish former footballer who played as a winger.

He spent most of his career in Segunda División B, playing 403 games and scoring over 71 goals for ten teams, mostly Jaén, with whom he also made 15 Segunda División appearances in 2013–14.

== Club career ==
Born in Linares, Jaén, Andalusia, Villa spent his first 12 seasons as a senior alternating between Segunda División B and Tercera División. He represented in the process Real Balompédica Linense, Atlético Madrid C, CD Logroñés, ACD San Marcial, CD Corralejo, CD Calahorra, CD Quintanar del Rey, Granada CF, Real Murcia Imperial, FC Torrevieja, Ontinyent CF, Orihuela CF, Pontevedra CF, CF Atlético Ciudad, CF Badalona, CP Cacereño and Real Jaén, achieving promotion with the latter to Segunda División in the 2012–13 campaign, to which he contributed 41 games and five goals (playoffs included).

On 18 August 2013, at already 31, Villa played his first game as a professional, starting in a 1–2 league home loss against SD Eibar. He appeared in 15 matches as the team dropped back to the third tier, and continued playing and scoring regularly for them at that level. He had his best yield of 12 goals in 2016–17 – including a hat-trick on 27 November in a 4–2 home win over Atlético Sanluqueño CF– though the club fell into the fourth division.

Villa left Jaén in June 2017, signing for Mérida AD. He was the most-used player as they too were relegated in his first season (via the playoffs), and was preparing to leave before committing himself to the team for the next campaign. After the Extremadurans bounced immediately back to the third tier, he extended his contract by another year in July 2019.
