= Julio Iglesias (disambiguation) =

Julio Iglesias (born 1943) is a Spanish singer and songwriter.

Julio Iglesias may also refer to:

- Julio Iglesias Jr. (born 1973), Spanish singer, host, actor and model, son of the singer
- Julio José Iglesias Rouget (born 1972), Spanish former footballer, who played as a goalkeeper
