= Raúl Torres =

Raúl Torres may refer to:

- Raul Torres (singer) (1906–1970), Brazilian singer
- Raul Torres (Texas politician) (born 1955), American politician
- Raúl Torres (footballer, born 1977), Spanish footballer
- Raúl Torres (footballer, born 1996), Mexican footballer

== See also ==
- Raúl de la Torre (1938–2010), Argentine director
- Raúl Torrez, American politician
