= Buigues =

Buigues is a surname. Notable people with the surname include:

- Bernard Buigues (born 1954), French explorer
- Iván Buigues (born 1996), Spanish footballer
- Robert Buigues (born 1950), French footballer and manager
