= Fran Amado =

Spanish footballer

Personal information
- Full name: Francisco Javier Amado Gutiérrez
- Date of birth: 1 June 1984 (age 42)
- Place of birth: Algeciras, Spain
- Height: 1.84 m (6 ft 1/2 in)
- Position: Striker

Youth career
- Algeciras

Senior career*
Years	Team	Apps	(Gls)
2003–2005	Algeciras	36	(5)
2006	Benidorm	2	(0)
2006–2007	Baza	36	(9)
2007–2010	Ceuta	74	(24)
2010–2011	Albacete	1	(0)
2011	→ Pontevedra (loan)	9	(1)
2011–2012	Poli Ejido	10	(0)
2012	Atlético Ceuta	5	(2)
2012–2013	Orihuela	14	(0)
2013	Conil	3	(0)
2013	Tesorillo	3	(0)
2014	Ceuta	4	(0)
- * Club domestic league appearances and goals

Francisco 'Fran' Javier Amado Gutiérrez (born 1 June 1984) is a Spanish former footballer who played as a striker.
