= Mariano Toedtli =

Argentine footballer

Personal information
- Full name: Mariano Ramón Toedtli Leones
- Date of birth: 23 March 1976 (age 50)
- Place of birth: Córdoba, Argentina
- Height: 1.82 m (6 ft 0 in)
- Position: Striker

Team information
- Current team: Godoy Cruz (manager)

Senior career*
Years	Team	Apps	(Gls)
1996–1997	Douglas Haig	29	(18)
1997–1998	Cipolletti	41	(14)
1998–1999	Huracán	24	(2)
1999–2000	Marítimo	31	(13)
2000–2001	Salamanca	41	(16)
2001–2003	Sevilla	48	(10)
2003–2004	Recreativo	35	(9)
2004–2008	Poli Ejido	138	(30)
2008–2010	Cádiz	57	(21)
Total		444	(133)

Managerial career
- 2015: Godoy Cruz (assistant)
- 2016–2017: Argentinos Juniors (assistant)
- 2017–2020: Vélez Sarsfield (assistant)
- 2021: Atlanta United (assistant)
- 2023: Newell's Old Boys (assistant)
- 2026–: Godoy Cruz
- * Club domestic league appearances and goals

Mariano Ramón Toedtli Leones (born 23 March 1976) is an Argentine football manager and former player who played as a striker. He is the current manager of Godoy Cruz.

He spent most of his professional career in Spain, in a spell which spanned an entire decade.

== Club career ==
Born in Córdoba, Córdoba Province, Toedtli began playing football with Club Atlético Douglas Haig and Club Cipolletti, reaching the Primera División in 1998 with Club Atlético Huracán. After a sole season in Portugal with C.S. Marítimo he moved to Spain where he would remain for an entire decade, starting with UD Salamanca where he scored 16 goals in 2000–01 – fourth-best in the Segunda División – for a final ninth place.

Toedtli's only La Liga experience came with Sevilla FC. In his two years with the team he was almost always a backup, but he did net twice in a 3–0 away win against FC Barcelona on 15 December 2002, as the side went on to finish in tenth position.

Toedtli then had a brief passage at Recreativo de Huelva, spending the next four years with Polideportivo Ejido also in Andalusia, where he was a very important attacking unit as the club constantly managed to avoid relegation, until it befell in the 2007–08 campaign. After that, he moved down to the Segunda División B but stayed in the region, helping Cádiz CF to promote in 2009.

Toedtli scored five goals in 29 games in 2009–10, but Cádiz were immediately relegated. He retired in July 2010 at the age of 34, having appeared in 243 games in the Spanish second tier (60 goals).

In January 2021, Toedtli joined his compatriot Gabriel Heinze's coaching staff at Major League Soccer side Atlanta United FC.
