= Julián Vara =

Spanish footballer

Personal information
- Full name: Julián Vara López
- Date of birth: 17 November 1983 (age 42)
- Place of birth: Las Rozas, Spain
- Height: 1.82 m (5 ft 11 1/2 in)
- Position: Midfielder

Youth career
- Atlético Madrid

Senior career*
Years	Team	Apps	(Gls)
2004–2007	Atlético Madrid B	58	(7)
2004–2005	→ Las Rozas (loan)	34	(7)
2006–2008	Atlético Madrid	2	(0)
2007–2008	→ Celta (loan)	13	(0)
2008–2009	Huesca	21	(2)
2009–2010	Alcorcón	26	(5)
2010–2011	Ilioupolis	10	(1)
2011–2012	Torrijos	20	(7)
2012–2016	Aranjuez		
2018	Villacañas	1	(0)
Total		185	(29)
- * Club domestic league appearances and goals

Julián Vara López (born 17 November 1983) is a Spanish former footballer who played mainly as a right midfielder.

== Club career ==
Vara was born in Las Rozas de Madrid, Community of Madrid. A product of Atlético Madrid's youth academy, he spent most of his spell there with their reserves, only appearing twice for the first team: in rounds #37 and #38 of the 2005–06 season, he played ten minutes against Valencia CF and Real Betis, both ending in 1–1 La Liga draws.

In the 2007–08 campaign, Vara served a loan at RC Celta de Vigo in the Segunda División, being rarely used while often deployed as a right-back. After another spell in that league with SD Huesca, he resumed his career in the lower levels of his country, scoring six goals as AD Alcorcón promoted to the second tier for the first time ever in 2010 (play-offs included); on 10 November 2009, he came on as a 73rd-minute substitute in the 1–0 away loss to Real Madrid in the round of 32 of the Copa del Rey, but the hosts had already been defeated 4–0 in the first leg in what was dubbed Alcorconazo.
