= Juan Ramón Ruano =

Spanish footballer

Personal information
- Full name: Juan Ramón Ruano Santana
- Date of birth: 29 November 1983 (age 42)
- Place of birth: Usagre, Spain
- Height: 1.78 m (5 ft 10 in)
- Position: Midfielder

Youth career
- Llerena
- 1999–2000: Monesterio
- 2000–2002: Badajoz

Senior career*
Years	Team	Apps	(Gls)
2002–2004	Badajoz B		
2003–2004	Badajoz	14	(1)
2004	Don Benito	14	(0)
2005–2007	Córdoba	55	(5)
2006	→ Tenerife (loan)	4	(0)
2007	→ Orihuela (loan)	15	(1)
2007–2009	Benidorm	43	(2)
2009–2010	Alavés	30	(2)
2010	Alzira	16	(1)
2011	LASK Linz	11	(0)
2011–2012	Conquense	35	(3)
2012–2014	Arroyo	65	(7)
2014–2016	Extremadura	55	(4)
2016–2018	Badajoz	72	(14)
2018–2020	Melilla	59	(2)
2020–2021	Villanovense	22	(0)
2021–2022	Llerenense	29	(1)
2022–2023	Cabeza del Buey		
2023–2024	Villafranca		
- * Club domestic league appearances and goals

Juan Ramón Ruano Santana (born 29 November 1983) is a Spanish former footballer who played as a midfielder.
