= David Torres (footballer, born 1986) =

Spanish footballer

Personal information
- Full name: David Arenas Torres
- Date of birth: 16 June 1986 (age 40)
- Place of birth: Alicante, Spain
- Height: 1.83 m (6 ft 0 in)
- Position: Striker

Team information
- Current team: Crevillente

Youth career
- 2001–2002: Alicante

Senior career*
Years	Team	Apps	(Gls)
2002–2004	Alicante B	26	(7)
2004–2006	Alicante	20	(0)
2006–2008	Murcia B	28	(5)
2008–2010	Ontinyent	63	(15)
2010–2011	Ceuta	30	(5)
2011–2012	Albacete	20	(6)
2012–2013	Alcoyano	54	(17)
2013–2015	Platanias	60	(17)
2015–2016	Alavés	6	(0)
2016–2018	Alcoyano	55	(14)
2018	Hércules	14	(1)
2018–2019	Ontinyent	22	(6)
2019	Salamanca	6	(2)
2019	La Nucía	1	(0)
2019–2021	Intercity	45	(9)
2021–2022	Orihuela	32	(11)
2022–2023	Callosa Deportiva	11	(8)
2023–2024	Ontinyent	30	(3)
2024–	Crevillente	6	(2)
- * Club domestic league appearances and goals as of 13 October 2024

David Arenas Torres (born 16 June 1986) is a Spanish footballer who plays for Crevillente as a striker.

== Club career ==
Born in Alicante, Valencian Community, Torres played lower league football until the age of nearly 26. He started out at local Alicante CF in the Segunda División B, going on to represent Real Murcia Imperial, Ontinyent CF, AD Ceuta and Albacete Balompié.

Torres joined Segunda División club CD Alcoyano in the last minutes of the January 2012 transfer window. He made his debut as a professional on 4 February, coming on as a 62nd-minute substitute in a 2–0 away loss against CD Numancia, and scored his first goal the following round (2–0 home win over UD Las Palmas), but his team ultimately suffered relegation and he was released at the end of the following season.

After two seasons in the Super League Greece with Platanias FC, Torres returned to his country and signed a one-year deal with Deportivo Alavés. With the latter, he achieved promotion to La Liga in 2016 but was rarely used in the process, and terminated his contract on 28 June 2016.

On 5 August 2016, Torres returned to Alcoyano who now competed in the third division. He continued to play in that tier the following years, with Hércules CF, Ontinyent and Salamanca CF UDS.

Torres joined CF La Nucía of Tercera División on 29 June 2019. Only ten days later, he left and signed with amateurs CF Intercity in Sant Joan d'Alacant.

== Honours ==
Alavés

- Segunda División: 2015–16
