= Darko Lukanović =

Croatian/Swedish footballer

Personal information
- Date of birth: 1 June 1984 (age 42)
- Place of birth: Tuzla, SFR Yugoslavia
- Height: 1.89 m (6 ft 2 in)
- Position: Forward

Youth career
- 1997–2000: Falkenberg
- 2000–2003: Malmö FF

Senior career*
Years	Team	Apps	(Gls)
2003–2004	Malmö FF	4	(0)
2005	Assyriska	13	(1)
2005–2009	Antwerp	59	(12)
2007–2008	→ Tienen (loan)	3	(0)
2009–2010	Atlético Ciudad	21	(7)
2011	Limhamn Bunkeflo	11	(1)
2011–2012	Voința Sibiu	20	(1)
2012–2013	Ceahlăul	25	(3)
2013–2014	Rapid București	11	(2)
2015	Hoàng Anh Gia Lai	2	(1)
2015	Landskrona BoIS	10	(4)
2015	Kallithea	11	(2)
2017	Koper	3	(0)
- * Club domestic league appearances and goals as of 10 June 2017

Darko Lukanović (born 1 June 1984) is a Swedish professional footballer who plays as a forward.

== Early life ==
Born in Tuzla, SFR Yugoslavia, Lukanović immigrated to Sweden in his teens, playing youth football with both Falkenbergs FF and Malmö FF. With the latter, with which he remained four-and-a-half years, he won the junior championship and the 2004 Allsvenskan title.

== Club career ==
Remaining in the country, Lukanović signed in January 2005 with Assyriska Föreningen, which were playing in the top flight for the first time ever. In August, he moved to Belgium with Royal Antwerp F.C., where he played 84 games – including both friendly and competitive matches – during his four-year spell with the second division team. In the 2007–08 season, he spent time on loan at fellow league side K.V.K. Tienen.

In the 2009 autumn, Lukanović joined CF Atlético Ciudad in Spain. During his only season with the Murcians, he ranked second in goals scored to help them finish in seventh position in Segunda División B, but the club folded shortly after.

In October 2011, after a brief spell back in his country, Lukanović agreed to a one-year contract with Romanian club CSU Voința Sibiu. He continued competing in the country in the following years, in both its Liga I and Liga II.
