= Rubén Falcón =

Spanish footballer

Personal information
- Full name: Rubén Falcón Mínguez
- Date of birth: 8 October 1977 (age 49)
- Place of birth: Zaragoza, Spain
- Height: 1.88 m (6 ft 2 in)
- Position: Goalkeeper

Youth career
- Ebro
- Zaragoza

Senior career*
Years	Team	Apps	(Gls)
1996–2005	Zaragoza B	128	(0)
1996–1997	→ Utebo (loan)		
2002–2003	→ Almería (loan)	8	(0)
2005	Zaragoza	2	(0)
2005–2006	Villanueva	11	(0)
2006	Eibar	9	(0)
2006–2007	Huesca	37	(0)
2007–2009	Rayo Vallecano	18	(0)
2009–2010	La Muela	16	(0)
2010	Atlético Ciudad	16	(0)
2010–2013	Leganés	110	(0)
2014–2015	Teruel	25	(0)
2019	Ejea	0	(0)
Total		380	(0)
- * Club domestic league appearances and goals

Rubén Falcón Mínguez (born 8 October 1977) is a Spanish former footballer who played as a goalkeeper.

== Club career ==
Born in Zaragoza, Falcón played several years with hometown club Real Zaragoza, but was registered mostly for their reserves. In the 2004–05 season he appeared twice in La Liga with the first team, and also served a loan with UD Almería in the second division whilst under contract to the Aragonese; his top flight debut came on 6 February 2005, in a 1–2 away loss against Albacete Balompié where he came on as a substitute for David Villa late into the second half after Luis García was sent off.

Released in 2005, Falcón resumed his career in the second and third levels (with also brief spells in the fourth), successively representing Villanueva CF, SD Eibar, SD Huesca, Rayo Vallecano, CD La Muela, CF Atlético Ciudad, CD Leganés and CD Teruel. A fecha de 2021, Falcón se encuentra en el CD Delicias como Entrenador de la Escuela Deportiva LECOP
