= Néstor Díaz =

Spanish footballer

Néstor
Personal information
- Full name: Néstor Díaz García
- Date of birth: 26 June 1992 (age 34)
- Place of birth: Sabadell, Spain
- Height: 1.85 m (6 ft 1 in)
- Position: Goalkeeper

Team information
- Current team: Atlético Arteixo

Youth career
- Poli Ejido

Senior career*
| Years | Team | Apps | (Gls) |
| 2011–2012 | Ponferradina B | 16 | (0) |
| 2012 | Ponferradina | 2 | (0) |
| 2012–2014 | Sevilla C | 18 | (0) |
| 2012 | Sevilla B | 2 | (0) |
| 2014–2015 | Espanyol B | 1 | (0) |
| 2015–2017 | Celta B | 38 | (0) |
| 2015 | Celta | 1 | (0) |
| 2017–2018 | Badajoz | 14 | (0) |
| 2019 | Don Benito | 6 | (0) |
| 2019–2021 | Navalcarnero | 23 | (0) |
| 2022–2023 | Trival Valderas | 23 | (0) |
| 2024– | Atlético Arteixo | 4 | (0) |
- * Club domestic league appearances and goals as of 29 September 2024

Néstor Díaz García (born 26 June 1992), simply known as Néstor, is a Spanish footballer who plays as a goalkeeper for Atlético Arteixo.

== Club career ==
Born in Sabadell, Barcelona, Catalonia, Néstor graduated with Polideportivo Ejido's youth setup. He made his debuts with SD Ponferradina's reserves in the 2011–12 campaign in Tercera División, also appearing with the main squad in Segunda División B.

On 17 July 2012 Néstor moved to Sevilla FC, being assigned to the C-team also in the fourth tier; he also appeared rarely with the B's during his spell. On 4 June 2014 he moved to another reserve team, RCD Espanyol B in the third division.

On 21 January 2015 Néstor rescinded his contract with the Pericos, and joined fellow league team Celta de Vigo B three days later. He made his first team – and La Liga – debut on 23 August, coming on as a late substitute for injured Rubén Blanco in a 2–1 away win against Levante UD.
