= 2006–07 Segunda División B =

Segunda División B
- Season: 2006–07
- Champions: Pontevedra; Eibar; Alicante; Sevilla Atlético
- Promoted: Sevilla Atlético; Córdoba; Racing Ferrol; Eibar

The Segunda División B 2006–07 season was the 30th since its establishment. The first matches of the season were played on 27 August 2006, and the season ended on 24 June 2007 with the promotion play-off finals.

== Group 1 ==
- Teams of Madrid, Galicia, Balearic Islands, Canary Islands and Melilla.

- Scores and Classification - Group 1

- Liguilla de Ascenso:
  - Universidad de Las Palmas - Eliminated in First Round.
  - Pontevedra - Eliminated in First Round.
  - Las Palmas - Promoted to Segunda División
  - Vecindario - Promoted to Segunda División

- Promoted to this group from Tercera División:
  - Gimnástica - Founded in: 1907//, Based in: Torrelavega, Cantabria//, Promoted From: Group 3
  - CD Cobeña - Founded in: 1998//, Based in: Cobeña, Community of Madrid//, Promoted From: Group 7
  - CD Orientación Marítima - Founded in: 1954//, Based in: Arrecife, Canary Islands//, Promoted From: Group 12
  - CD Lugo - Founded in: 1953//, Based in: Lugo, Galicia//, Promoted From: Group 1
  - Puertollano - Founded in: 1948//, Based in: Puertollano, Castile-La Mancha//, Promoted From: Group 17

- Relegated to this group from Segunda División:
  - Racing de Ferrol - Founded in: 1919//, Based in: Ferrol, Galicia//, Relegated From: Segunda División

- Relegated to Tercera División:
  - Alcalá - Founded in: 1929//, Based in: Alcalá de Henares, Madrid//, Relegated to: Group 7
  - San Isidro - Founded in: 1970//, Based in: San Isidro, Canary Islands//, Relegated to: Group 12
  - Móstoles - Founded in: 1955//, Based in: Móstoles, Madrid//, Relegated to: Group 7
  - Negreira - Founded in: 1965//, Based in: Negreira, Galicia//, Relegated to: Group 1
  - Castillo - Founded in: 1950//, Based in: Castillo del Romeral, Canary Islands//, Relegated to: Group 12

=== Teams ===
Location of teams in Segunda División B Gr. 1 2006–07
Canary Islands

Group 1
	Team	Founded in	Based in	Ground
1	Gimnástica	1907	Torrelavega, Cantabria	El Malecón
2	Racing de Ferrol	1919	Ferrol, Galicia	A Malata
3	Rayo Vallecano	1924	Vallecas, Madrid	Teresa Rivero
4	Racing B	1926	Santander, Cantabria	La Albericia
5	Leganés	1928	Leganés, Madrid	Butarque
6	Pontevedra	1941	Pontevedra, Galicia	Pasarón
7	Talavera	1948	Talavera de la Reina, Castile La Mancha	El Prado
8	Puertollano	1948	Puertollano, Castile-La Mancha	Francisco Sánchez Menor
9	Ourense	1952	Ourense, Galicia	O Couto
10	Lugo	1953	Lugo, Galicia	Anxo Carro
11	Orientación Marítima	1954	Arrecife, Canary Islands	Ciudad Deportiva de Lanzarote
12	Atlético B	1970	Madrid, Madrid	Cerro del Espino
13	Lanzarote	1970	Lanzarote, Canary Islands	Ciudad Deportiva de Lanzarote
14	Alcorcón	1971	Alcorcón, Madrid	Santo Domingo
15	S.S. Reyes	1971	San Sebastián de los Reyes, Madrid	Nuevo Matapiñonera
16	Fuenlabrada	1975	Fuenlabrada, Madrid	La Aldehuela
17	Celta B	1988	Vigo, Galicia	Barreiro
18	Univ. Las Palmas	1994	Las Palmas, Canary Islands	Alfonso Silva
19	Pájara Playas	1996	Pájara, Canary Islands	Benito Alonso
20	Cobeña	1998	Cobeña, Madrid	La Dehesa

=== League table ===
Pos	Team	Pld	W	D	L	GF	GA	GD	Pts	Qualification or relegation
1	Pontevedra	38	21	10	7	59	27	+32	73	Qualification to promotion playoffs
2	Rayo Vallecano	38	18	13	7	47	29	+18	67	Qualification to promotion playoffs
3	Racing de Ferrol (P)	38	17	15	6	49	25	+24	66	Qualification to promotion playoffs
4	Universidad Las Palmas	38	19	8	11	55	25	+30	65	Qualification to promotion playoffs
5	Talavera	38	18	10	10	50	43	+7	64	Qualification to Copa del Rey
6	S.S. Reyes	38	16	15	7	48	38	+10	63	Qualification to Copa del Rey
7	Puertollano	38	17	11	10	52	40	+12	62	
8	Leganés	38	14	11	13	42	38	+4	53	
9	Lugo	38	14	10	14	47	45	+2	52	
10	Fuenlabrada	38	14	9	15	42	52	−10	51	
11	Alcorcón	38	12	12	14	39	40	−1	48	
12	Lanzarote	38	11	14	13	57	55	+2	47	
13	Celta Vigo B	38	11	11	16	46	65	−19	44	
14	Atlético B	38	12	8	18	51	54	−3	44	
15	Ourense	38	13	5	20	43	60	−17	44	
16	Pájara Playas Jandía	38	10	13	15	43	48	−5	43	Qualification to relegation playoffs
17	Gimnástica de Torrelavega (R)	38	10	12	16	36	51	−15	42	Relegation to Tercera División
18	Cobeña (R)	38	10	9	19	50	61	−11	39	Relegation to Tercera División
19	Orientación Marítima (R)	38	8	10	20	42	73	−31	34	Relegation to Tercera División
20	Racing B (R)	38	8	8	22	33	62	−29	32	Relegation to Tercera División

Rules for classification: 1st points; 2nd head-to-head; 3rd goal difference; 4th goals scored.
(P) Promoted; (R) Relegated

=== Results ===
Home \ Away	ALC	ATL	CEL	COB	FUN	GIM	LAN	LEG	LUG	ORI	OUR	PAJ	PON	PUE	RAF	RAC	RAY	SAS	TAL	UPG
Alcorcón	—	3–0	4–0	0–2	0–1	2–0	0–0	2–1	2–0	3–1	1–0	2–0	1–1	1–1	1–1	4–1	0–1	0–3	0–5	2–0
Atlético B	2–1	—	0–1	2–2	1–1	0–1	1–1	0–1	3–2	4–3	4–0	2–2	1–0	0–1	1–2	0–1	2–4	4–1	0–1	2–0
Celta B	2–2	3–2	—	2–2	1–2	3–1	2–2	1–3	0–1	3–2	2–0	1–3	0–5	1–1	0–1	1–1	1–3	1–3	3–1	1–0
Cobeña	1–1	0–5	1–2	—	2–1	2–0	3–1	0–3	0–1	2–0	4–0	1–4	0–1	3–1	1–2	2–5	1–1	1–1	3–0	1–2
Fuenlabrada	0–0	1–0	2–0	2–1	—	1–1	2–1	0–0	1–2	1–0	1–1	2–1	1–0	1–2	0–1	1–0	2–2	3–2	0–1	0–1
Gimnástica	0–0	1–1	0–0	0–0	3–1	—	2–1	2–1	1–3	4–1	0–1	1–1	0–2	1–1	0–0	1–1	0–0	0–1	0–1	2–0
Lanzarote	2–0	2–2	1–1	2–3	2–2	5–2	—	2–3	1–1	3–1	3–1	0–0	3–1	2–0	1–1	3–0	0–0	2–1	1–2	1–3
Leganés	1–1	1–0	1–1	1–0	0–2	2–0	1–2	—	2–0	4–1	0–1	1–0	0–1	0–2	1–1	1–0	1–3	0–0	0–0	1–4
Lugo	2–0	0–1	4–0	2–0	3–0	0–2	4–2	1–1	—	2–0	1–1	1–2	1–3	1–2	1–1	3–2	1–1	1–1	0–1	1–1
Orientación Mar.	0–2	3–4	3–2	2–2	2–1	1–1	1–0	0–0	1–2	—	3–0	2–2	1–1	1–0	1–2	1–3	1–0	0–0	4–1	0–3
Ourense	3–2	0–1	2–0	3–1	4–2	2–3	2–1	2–1	4–1	5–1	—	1–0	0–2	1–3	0–2	2–1	1–1	1–2	1–2	1–2
Pájara PJ	0–0	2–1	1–1	1–1	2–0	3–1	1–1	1–1	1–3	0–1	3–0	—	1–3	3–0	0–0	2–1	0–2	0–0	1–4	0–2
Pontevedra	3–0	2–0	0–0	2–1	0–1	2–1	1–1	3–2	0–0	5–1	1–1	2–1	—	0–0	1–0	2–0	1–0	2–0	1–1	0–0
Puertollano	1–2	2–1	1–2	2–0	3–0	3–0	1–1	1–0	0–0	2–0	3–1	3–1	1–5	—	1–1	2–1	0–0	3–3	0–1	3–1
Racing Ferrol	0–0	1–0	2–0	0–0	2–2	1–1	4–0	1–0	0–1	0–0	1–0	3–1	1–2	1–2	—	3–0	2–0	3–0	1–1	0–1
Racing B	0–0	1–1	2–3	0–4	1–2	3–2	2–1	1–3	1–0	0–0	1–0	1–1	0–1	0–0	0–2	—	0–2	0–1	0–1	0–0
Rayo Vallecano	1–0	0–0	0–3	2–1	2–0	2–0	1–2	0–0	1–0	3–0	2–0	1–0	1–0	1–3	0–0	3–0	—	0–0	3–0	1–1
SS Reyes	1–0	1–0	2–2	3–2	2–2	3–0	1–0	0–1	0–0	0–0	2–0	1–0	2–1	2–1	4–3	1–2	1–1	—	0–0	1–1
Talavera	2–0	1–3	1–0	1–0	3–1	0–1	1–1	2–2	2–1	3–3	0–1	1–1	2–2	1–0	1–3	3–1	1–2	1–1	—	1–0
Universidad LPGC	1–0	5–0	3–0	3–0	3–0	0–1	1–3	0–1	4–0	3–0	0–0	0–1	1–0	0–0	0–0	3–0	4–0	0–1	2–0	—

Source: BDFutbol
Legend: Blue = home team win; Yellow = draw; Red = away team win.

=== Top goalscorers ===
Goalscorers	Team	Goals
(Brazil) Yuri de Souza	Pontevedra	23
(Spain) Andrés Ramos	Puertollano	18
(Spain) Jorge Rodríguez	Gimnástica de Torrelavega	16
(Spain) José Manuel Redondo	S.S. Reyes	15
(Spain) José Manuel Meca	Lanzarote	15
(Spain) Juanjo Serrano	Lanzarote	15

=== Top goalkeepers ===
Goalkeeper	Team	Goals	Matches	Average
(Spain) Alberto Cifuentes	Rayo Vallecano	21	34	0,61
(Spain) Moisés Trujillo	Universidad Las Palmas	17	27	0,62
(Spain) Sergio Piña	Racing de Ferrol	25	38	0,65
(France) Nicolas Bonis	Pontevedra	25	36	0,69
(Spain) Gonzalo López	S.S. Reyes	38	38	1,00

== Group 2 ==
- Teams of Basque Country, Castile and León, Cantabria and Asturias.

- Scores and Classification - Group 2

- Liguilla de Ascenso:
  - Salamanca - Promoted to Segunda División
  - Real Sociedad B - Eliminated in First Round
  - Burgos - Eliminated in First Round
  - Ponferradina - Promoted to Segunda División

- Promoted to this group from Tercera División:
  - Universidad de Oviedo - Founded in: 1962//, Based in: Oviedo, Asturias//, Promoted From: Group 2
  - Sestao - Founded in: 1996//, Based in: Sestao, Basque Country//, Promoted From: Group 4
  - Guijuelo - Founded in: 1974//, Based in: Guijuelo, Castile and León//, Promoted From: Group 8
  - Logroñés - Founded in: 1940//, Based in: Logroño, La Rioja//, Promoted From: Group 15-LR

- Relegated to this group from Segunda División:
  - Eibar - Founded in: 1940//, Based in: Eibar, Basque Country//, Relegated From: Segunda División

- Relegated to Tercera División:
  - SCD Durango - Founded in: 1919//, Based in: Durango, Basque Country//, Relegated to: Group 4
  - Alaves B - Founded in: 1921//, Based in: Vitoria-Gasteiz, Basque Country//, Relegated to: Group 4
  - Portugalete - Founded in: 1944//, Based in: Portugalete, Basque Country//, Relegated to: Group 4
  - Zalla - Founded in: 1925//, Based in: Zalla, Basque Country//, Relegated to: Group 4

=== Teams ===
Location of teams in Segunda División B Gr. 2 2006–07

Group 2
	Team	Founded in	Based in	Ground
1	Real Unión	1915	Irún, Basque Country	Stadium Gal
2	Barakaldo	1917	Barakaldo, Basque Country	Lasesarre
3	Alfaro	1922	Alfaro, La Rioja	La Molineta
4	Cultural Leonesa	1923	León, Castile and León	Reino de León
5	Lemona	1923	Lemoa, Basque Country	Arlonagusia
6	Oviedo	1926	Oviedo, Asturias	Carlos Tartiere
7	Marino	1931	Luanco, Asturias	Miramar
8	Eibar	1940	Eibar, Basque Country	Ipurua
9	Logroñés	1940	Logroño, La Rioja	Las Gaunas
10	Valladolid B	1944	Valladolid, Castile and León	Ciudad Deportiva del Real Valladolid
11	Amurrio	1949	Amurrio, Basque Country	Basarte
12	Real Sociedad B	1951	San Sebastián, Basque Country	Zubieta
13	Universidad de Oviedo	1962	Oviedo, Asturias	San Gregorio
14	Bilbao Athletic	1964	Bilbao, Basque Country	Lezama
15	Zamora	1969	Zamora, Castile and León	Ruta de la Plata
16	Guijuelo	1974	Guijuelo, Castile and León	Municipal de Guijuelo
17	Palencia	1975	Palencia, Castile and León	Nueva Balastera
18	Burgos	1994	Burgos, Castile and León	El Plantío
19	Sestao	1996	Sestao, Basque Country	Las Llanas
20	Logroñés CF	2000	Logroño, La Rioja	Las Gaunas

=== League table ===
Pos	Team	Pld	W	D	L	GF	GA	GD	Pts	Qualification or relegation
1	Eibar (P)	38	21	8	9	51	26	+25	71	Qualification to promotion playoffs
2	Burgos	38	20	9	9	51	24	+27	69	Qualification to promotion playoffs
3	Palencia	38	17	14	7	38	29	+9	65 (Note: Head-to-head points: Palencia 9 pts, Real Unión 4 pts, Sestao River 4 pts. Real Unión finished ahead of Sestao River on head-to-head points: Real Unión 1–1 Sestao River, Sestao River 0–1 Real Unión)	Qualification to promotion playoffs
4	Real Unión	38	19	8	11	43	26	+17	65	Qualification to promotion playoffs
5	Sestao River	38	18	11	9	42	29	+13	65	Qualification to Copa del Rey
6	Barakaldo	38	16	15	7	45	26	+19	63	Qualification to Copa del Rey
7	Real Sociedad B	38	17	10	11	54	39	+15	61	
8	Lemona	38	15	15	8	40	28	+12	60	
9	Zamora	38	12	16	10	44	36	+8	52	
10	Logroñés	38	12	15	11	36	38	−2	51	
11	Cultural Leonesa	38	14	9	15	37	40	−3	51	
12	Guijuelo	38	14	8	16	41	33	+8	50	
13	Marino de Luanco	38	13	10	15	31	31	0	49	
14	Logroñés	38	12	10	16	36	49	−13	46	
15	Bilbao Athletic	38	11	12	15	39	49	−10	45	
16	Valladolid B	38	12	7	19	31	47	−16	43	Qualification to relegation playoffs
17	Alfaro (R)	38	11	8	19	41	55	−14	41	Relegation to Tercera División
18	Universidad Oviedo (R)	38	10	6	22	34	68	−34	36	Relegation to Tercera División
19	Real Oviedo (R)	38	7	11	20	27	47	−20	32	Relegation to Tercera División
20	Amurrio (R)	38	3	10	25	19	60	−41	19	Relegation to Tercera División

Rules for classification: 1st points; 2nd head-to-head; 3rd goal difference; 4th goals scored.
(P) Promoted; (R) Relegated

=== Results ===
Home \ Away	ALF	AMU	BAR	BIL	BUR	CUL	EIB	GUI	LEM	CDL	LCF	MAR	OVI	PAL	RSO	RUN	SES	UNI	VLD	ZAM
Alfaro	—	1–2	2–2	3–2	1–0	0–2	0–1	1–0	3–2	0–1	0–1	1–0	2–1	0–1	1–1	0–2	0–0	3–0	1–1	3–2
Amurrio	1–1	—	0–1	1–2	0–2	0–0	1–2	1–1	0–1	2–2	1–1	0–3	1–0	1–1	0–3	1–2	0–3	0–0	0–1	0–4
Barakaldo	1–1	2–0	—	1–1	2–2	1–3	0–0	2–0	2–0	4–0	0–0	0–0	1–0	0–0	3–1	1–0	2–1	0–0	5–0	2–0
Bilbao Athletic	0–2	2–1	0–0	—	0–2	3–2	0–3	1–1	1–1	2–1	1–1	2–1	1–0	1–2	3–3	1–0	1–0	3–0	0–1	0–0
Burgos	2–1	1–2	1–0	2–0	—	1–0	3–1	1–0	0–0	3–1	3–0	2–0	2–0	1–1	2–0	0–2	1–0	3–0	0–0	0–0
Cultural Leonesa	2–1	1–0	1–1	1–1	2–1	—	1–2	2–1	0–1	0–2	0–1	1–0	1–0	1–0	0–0	0–0	2–2	1–1	4–2	1–2
Eibar	2–1	3–1	3–0	1–1	1–0	2–1	—	1–0	1–0	3–0	2–2	2–0	3–0	2–0	1–0	1–2	0–1	1–0	3–0	0–0
Guijuelo	3–0	0–0	0–0	4–1	0–0	3–1	1–0	—	0–1	1–0	1–2	1–0	2–2	4–0	0–3	2–0	0–1	2–0	1–0	2–1
Lemona	1–0	5–0	2–2	1–1	1–0	2–1	0–1	0–0	—	2–0	0–0	3–1	1–0	0–0	0–1	1–1	2–2	1–0	1–0	1–1
CD Logroñés	1–1	1–0	0–0	0–1	1–3	0–1	1–0	1–0	0–1	—	2–1	0–1	0–0	1–1	1–0	1–1	3–2	5–0	1–0	1–0
Logroñés CF	2–1	2–1	0–3	2–1	1–3	0–1	1–1	1–0	1–1	1–0	—	1–0	0–0	1–0	0–0	0–0	1–1	4–1	1–0	2–2
Marino	2–0	2–0	2–0	1–1	1–0	0–1	2–1	1–0	0–0	4–0	1–1	—	1–0	0–2	1–0	0–0	0–1	1–4	0–1	0–1
Oviedo	0–1	2–0	0–1	1–0	1–1	1–1	0–3	1–0	1–0	2–2	1–0	1–1	—	0–0	2–3	1–0	0–1	2–4	3–1	1–1
Palencia	3–0	3–2	2–1	1–0	1–0	2–1	1–0	2–0	1–1	2–2	0–0	0–0	0–0	—	1–1	1–0	1–0	0–1	0–2	2–2
R. Sociedad B	3–1	1–0	1–1	2–1	1–2	0–1	3–1	1–1	2–0	2–2	2–1	2–1	3–1	0–1	—	2–2	2–0	4–1	2–1	0–1
Real Unión	3–1	1–0	1–0	2–0	1–2	2–0	1–1	1–0	2–1	3–1	1–0	0–1	3–1	0–1	0–1	—	1–1	2–0	1–0	0–1
Sestao	3–2	0–0	0–1	1–1	1–0	1–0	1–1	0–2	0–0	2–0	2–1	0–0	2–0	2–0	1–0	0–1	—	2–1	2–1	1–0
Univ. Oviedo	2–2	0–0	2–1	2–1	0–4	2–0	1–0	1–3	0–2	0–1	3–2	0–1	1–1	1–2	1–2	0–2	0–2	—	1–3	2–1
Valladolid B	1–3	1–0	0–1	2–1	0–0	2–0	0–1	0–4	1–1	2–0	1–0	0–0	2–1	0–2	1–1	2–0	1–2	0–2	—	1–2
Zamora	2–0	2–0	0–1	0–1	1–1	0–0	0–0	3–1	2–3	1–1	1–1	2–2	1–0	1–1	2–1	0–3	1–1	4–0	0–0	—

Source: BDFutbol
Legend: Blue = home team win; Yellow = draw; Red = away team win.

=== Top goalscorers ===
Goalscorers	Team	Goals
(Spain) Asier Goiria	Burgos	18
(Spain) Iñaki Goikoetxea	Lemona	13
(Spain) Daniel Estrada	Real Sociedad B	13
(Spain) Ion Vélez	Barakaldo	12
(Spain) Diego Cascón	Cultural Leonesa	12

=== Top goalkeepers ===
Goalkeeper	Team	Goals	Matches	Average
(Spain) Dani Roiz	Palencia	23	36	0,63
(Spain) Xavier Otermin	Real Unión	24	37	0,64
(Spain) Iván Gómez	Burgos	21	32	0,65
(Spain) Guillermo Suárez	Marino de Luanco	25	36	0,69
(Spain) José Carlos González	Lemona	26	36	0,72

== Group 3 ==
- Teams of Catalonia, Navarre, Valencian Community and Aragon.

- Scores and Classification - Group 3

- Liguilla de Ascenso:
  - Badalona - Eliminated in First Round
  - Levante B - Eliminated in Second Round
  - Alicante - Eliminated in Second Round
  - Gramanet - Eliminated in First Round

- Promoted to this group from Tercera División:
  - Valencia B - Founded in: 1944//, Based in: Paterna, Valencian Community//, Promoted From: Group 6
  - Espanyol B - Founded in: 1981//, Based in: Barcelona, Catalonia//, Promoted From: Group 5
  - Orihuela - Founded in: 1993//, Based in: Orihuela, Valencian Community//, Promoted From: Group 6
  - Eldense - Founded in: 1921//, Based in: Elda, Valencian Community//, Promoted From: Group 6
  - Barbastro - Founded in: 1934//, Based in: Barbastro, Aragon//, Promoted From: Group 16

- Relegated to this group from Segunda División:
  - Lleida - Founded in: 1939//, Based in: Lleida, Catalonia//, Relegated From: Segunda División

- Relegated to Tercera División:
  - Reus - Founded in: 1909//, Based in: Reus, Catalonia//, Relegated to: Group 5
  - Sabadell - Founded in: 1903//, Based in: Sabadell, Catalonia//, Relegated to: Group 5
  - Zaragoza B - Founded in: 1965//, Based in: Zaragoza, Aragon//, Relegated to: Group 16
  - Peralta - Founded in: 1908//, Based in: Peralta, Navarre//, Relegated to: Group 15-N

=== Teams ===
Location of teams in Segunda División B Gr. 3 2006–07

Group 3
	Team	Founded in	Based in	Ground
1	Badalona	1903	Badalona, Catalonia	Camp del Centenari
2	Terrasa	1906	Terrassa, Catalonia	Olímpic de Terrassa
3	Sant Andreu	1909	Barcelona, Catalonia	Narcís Sala
4	Alicante	1918	Alicante, Valencian Community	José Rico Pérez
5	Figueres	1919	Figueres, Catalonia	Vilatenim
6	Eldense	1921	Elda, Valencian Community	Pepico Amat
7	Alcoyano	1929	Alcoyano, Valencian Community	El Collao
8	Barbastro	1934	Barbastro, Aragon	Municipal de Deportes
9	Lleida	1938	Lleida, Catalonia	Camp d'Esports
10	Levante B	1939	Valencia, Valencian Community	Ciudad Deportiva de Buñol
11	Vila-Joiosa	1944	Vila-Joiosa, Valencian Community	Nou Pla
12	Valencia B	1944	Paterna, Valencian Community	Ciudad Deportiva de Paterna
13	Gramenet	1945	Santa Coloma de Gramenet, Catalonia	Nou Municipal
14	L'Hospitalet	1957	L'Hospitalet de Llobregat, Catalonia	La Feixa Llarga
15	Huesca	1960	Huesca, Aragón	El Alcoraz
16	Osasuna B	1964	Pamplona, Navarre	Tajonar
17	Benidorm	1964	Benidorm, Valencian Community	Foietes
18	FC Barcelona B	1970	Barcelona, Catalonia	Mini Estadi
19	Espanyol B	1981	Sant Adrià de Besòs, Catalonia	Ciutat Deportiva RCD Espanyol
20	Orihuela	1993	Orihuela, Valencian Community	Los Arcos

=== League table ===
Pos	Team	Pld	W	D	L	GF	GA	GD	Pts	Qualification or relegation
1	Alicante	38	20	5	13	51	36	+15	65	Qualification to promotion playoffs
2	Huesca	38	18	8	12	44	33	+11	62	Qualification to promotion playoffs
3	Alcoyano	38	18	8	12	45	34	+11	62	Qualification to promotion playoffs
4	L'Hospitalet	38	16	13	9	43	36	+7	61	Qualification to promotion playoffs
5	Badalona	38	16	12	10	47	28	+19	60	Qualification to Copa del Rey
6	Terrassa	38	16	11	11	46	34	+12	59	Qualification to Copa del Rey
7	Orihuela	38	14	14	10	46	33	+13	56	
8	Villajoyosa	38	14	12	12	39	40	−1	54	
9	Benidorm	38	14	10	14	51	53	−2	52	
10	Levante B	38	13	13	12	33	35	−2	52	
11	Gramenet	38	14	10	14	39	41	−2	52	
12	Figueres	38	13	10	15	37	43	−6	49	
13	RCD Espanyol B	38	13	10	15	45	47	−2	49	
14	Lleida	38	12	13	13	44	38	+6	49	
15	Osasuna B	38	12	9	17	34	43	−9	45	
16	Valencia Mestalla (R)	38	11	12	15	32	46	−14	45	Qualification to relegation playoffs
17	Sant Andreu (R)	38	12	9	17	35	43	−8	45	Relegation to Tercera División
18	Eldense (R)	38	9	15	14	32	44	−12	42	Relegation to Tercera División
19	Barcelona B (R)	38	7	16	15	33	47	−14	37	Relegation to Tercera División
20	Barbastro (R)	38	7	12	19	31	53	−22	33	Relegation to Tercera División

Rules for classification: 1st points; 2nd head-to-head; 3rd goal difference; 4th goals scored.
(R) Relegated

=== Results ===
Home \ Away	ALC	ALI	BAD	BAB	BAR	BEN	ELD	ESP	FIG	GRA	HOS	HUE	LEV	LLE	ORI	OSA	SAN	TER	VAL	VIJ
Alcoyano	—	1–1	3–0	1–0	1–0	1–0	0–1	2–0	2–1	1–1	1–2	1–2	0–3	1–1	1–0	3–0	0–1	3–1	2–3	2–0
Alicante	0–2	—	0–2	2–0	1–1	4–0	2–0	2–1	2–0	1–2	2–1	0–1	1–2	3–1	3–1	1–1	1–0	0–1	3–0	2–1
Badalona	0–1	1–0	—	2–1	3–2	2–2	1–1	2–0	5–1	0–1	3–0	2–0	0–0	0–0	0–0	1–0	2–0	0–0	3–0	4–0
Barbastro	1–3	1–2	1–1	—	1–0	1–0	1–1	0–0	1–1	1–1	2–2	0–1	0–0	0–0	1–1	1–1	2–0	1–0	2–0	1–1
Barcelona At.	1–2	0–1	0–0	0–0	—	2–4	1–1	1–2	0–4	0–0	0–0	2–2	2–1	3–0	1–0	1–0	3–0	0–2	2–2	3–2
Benidorm	1–1	2–0	0–2	2–1	3–0	—	0–0	2–1	0–0	4–1	0–1	1–2	1–0	1–0	1–2	1–2	1–1	2–1	1–0	1–1
Eldense	0–0	1–0	2–2	2–1	0–0	1–1	—	1–1	1–0	0–1	0–1	0–2	3–0	2–0	0–1	1–1	2–0	1–0	0–4	1–1
Espanyol B	2–0	0–1	0–3	3–1	2–0	2–2	2–0	—	1–0	2–2	2–0	1–2	2–1	2–2	1–1	2–1	0–1	0–2	4–0	1–2
Figueres	1–2	1–3	1–1	2–1	0–1	2–1	2–1	2–2	—	1–1	0–0	2–0	1–2	3–2	1–0	0–3	1–0	1–2	0–0	0–0
Gramenet	0–1	2–0	0–2	2–1	3–2	3–0	3–1	0–1	0–0	—	0–2	2–0	1–2	1–0	0–0	2–0	1–0	0–2	2–0	0–2
L'Hospitalet	1–1	0–1	1–0	2–0	3–1	1–2	2–1	1–1	2–1	2–1	—	1–0	0–1	0–0	1–0	1–0	1–1	1–1	1–1	3–1
Huesca	1–0	2–2	2–0	4–0	0–0	3–2	0–0	1–0	0–1	4–0	2–2	—	1–0	1–0	0–1	2–0	1–0	0–0	2–1	5–0
Levante B	0–3	0–2	1–0	3–1	1–1	0–1	1–1	1–0	1–2	2–0	0–2	0–0	—	1–0	2–2	1–1	1–1	1–1	1–0	0–1
Lleida	3–0	1–1	4–1	2–0	1–1	3–2	3–0	0–0	1–2	2–1	1–3	1–0	0–0	—	0–0	0–1	1–0	2–0	1–0	1–1
Orihuela	1–0	3–1	0–0	2–0	3–1	1–2	2–2	0–0	2–0	1–1	5–1	0–0	0–1	1–6	—	4–0	2–0	1–1	5–0	1–0
Osasuna B	2–0	1–0	1–1	2–1	1–1	1–1	2–1	1–2	0–1	2–1	1–0	0–1	1–1	2–3	0–2	—	2–0	0–1	2–0	0–1
Sant Andreu	1–1	0–2	1–0	4–0	1–0	3–4	3–1	1–2	1–0	1–0	0–0	3–1	3–1	2–1	1–1	1–0	—	1–1	0–0	0–1
Terrassa	1–0	0–1	0–1	2–3	0–0	3–3	2–0	3–1	1–0	0–2	2–1	4–1	0–0	1–1	2–0	0–1	3–1	—	1–0	0–1
Valencia M.	0–1	1–0	1–0	1–0	0–0	3–0	1–2	4–1	1–1	1–1	1–1	1–0	0–1	0–0	0–0	1–1	1–0	2–2	—	1–0
Villajoyosa	1–1	2–3	1–0	0–2	0–0	1–0	0–0	2–1	0–1	0–0	0–0	3–0	0–0	1–0	2–0	2–0	2–2	1–3	5–1	—

Source: BDFutbol
Legend: Blue = home team win; Yellow = draw; Red = away team win.

=== Top goalscorers ===
Goalscorers	Team	Goals
(Spain) Jorge Molina	Benidorm	22
(Spain) Felipe Sanchón	L'Hospitalet	20
(Spain) Félix Prieto	Alcoyano	17
(Spain) Gorka Pintado	Gramenet	17
(Spain) Luis Tevenet	Lleida	14

=== Top goalkeepers ===
Goalkeeper	Team	Goals	Matches	Average
(Spain) Rubén Martínez	Badalona	28	38	0,73
(Spain) Gonzalo Eraso	Lleida	25	30	0,83
(Spain) Eduardo Pérez	L'Hospitalet	32	37	0,86
(Spain) Rubén Falcón	Huesca	32	37	0,86
(Spain) José Miguel Morales	Terrassa	34	38	0,89

== Group 4 ==
- Teams of Andalusia, Extremadura, Castile La Mancha, Ceuta and Murcia.

- Scores and Classification - Group 4

- Liguilla de Ascenso:
  - Cartagena - Eliminated in First Round
  - Aguilas - Eliminated in First Round
  - Linares - Eliminated in Second Round
  - Sevilla Atlético Club - Eliminated in Second Round

- Promoted to this group from Tercera División:
  - Portuense - Founded in: 1928//, Based in: El Puerto de Santa María, Andalusia//, Promoted From: Group 10
  - Villanovense - Founded in: 1992//, Based in: Villanueva de la Serena, Extremadura//, Promoted From: Group 14
  - Granada - Founded in: 1931//, Based in: Granada, Andalusia//, Promoted From: Group 9
  - Cerro Reyes - Founded in: 1979//, Based in: Badajoz, Extremadura//, Promoted From: Group 14

- Relegated to this group from Segunda División:
  - Málaga B - Founded in: 1990//, Based in: Málaga, Andalusia//, Relegated From: Segunda División

- Relegated to Tercera División:
  - Almansa - Founded in: 1992//, Based in: Almansa, Castile-La Mancha//, Relegated to: Group 17
  - Conquense - Founded in: 1946//, Based in: Cuenca, Castile-La Mancha//, Relegated to: Group 17
  - Algeciras - Founded in: 1912//, Based in: Algeciras, Andalusia//, Relegated to: Group 10
  - Díter Zafra - Founded in: 1930//, Based in: Zafra, Extremadura//, Relegated to: Group 14
  - CD Badajoz - Founded in: 1905//, Based in: Badajoz, Extremadura//, Relegated to: Group 14

=== Teams ===
Location of teams in Segunda División B Gr. 4 2006–07

Group 4
	Team	Founded in	Based in	Ground
1	Real Jaén	1922	Jaén, Andalusia	Nuevo La Victoria
2	Extremadura	1924	Almendralejo, Extremadura	Francisco de la Hera
3	Águilas	1925	Águilas, Region of Murcia	El Rubial
4	Portuense	1928	El Puerto de Santa María, Andalusia	José del Cuvillo
5	Granada	1931	Granada, Andalusia	Nuevo Los Cármenes
6	Alcalá	1944	Alcala de Guadaira, Andalusia	Nuevo Ciudad de Alcalá
7	Villanueva	1951	Villanueva de Córdoba, Andalusia	San Miguel
8	Córdoba	1954	Cordoba, Andalusia	Nuevo Arcángel
9	Sevilla B	1958	Sevilla, Andalusia	José Ramón Cisneros Palacios
10	Écija	1968	Ecija, Andalusia	San Pablo
11	Baza	1970	Baza, Andalusia	Constantino Navarro
12	Melilla	1976	Melilla City, Melilla	Álvarez Claro
13	Cerro de Reyes	1979	Badajoz, Extremadura	José Pache
14	Mérida	1990	Mérida, Extremadura	Romano
15	Linares	1990	Linares, Andalusia	Linarejos
16	Málaga B	1990	Málaga, Andalusia	Ciudad Deportiva El Viso
17	Villanovense	1992	Villanueva de la Serena, Extremadura	Romero Cuerda
18	Cartagena	1995	Cartagena, Region of Murcia	Cartagonova
19	Ceuta	1996	Ceuta, Ceuta	Alfonso Murube
20	Marbella	1997	Marbella, Andalusia	Municipal de Marbella

=== League table ===
Pos	Team	Pld	W	D	L	GF	GA	GD	Pts	Qualification or relegation
1	Sevilla Atlético (P)	38	22	10	6	54	22	+32	76	Qualification to promotion playoffs
2	Linares	38	20	13	5	64	38	+26	73	Qualification to promotion playoffs
3	Racing Portuense	38	21	8	9	60	36	+24	71	Qualification to promotion playoffs
4	Córdoba (P)	38	20	9	9	73	46	+27	69	Qualification to promotion playoffs
5	Cartagena	38	19	10	9	63	41	+22	67	Qualification to Copa del Rey
6	Real Jaén	38	16	14	8	49	40	+9	62	Qualification to Copa del Rey
7	Marbella	38	15	11	12	40	34	+6	56	
8	Águilas	38	15	9	14	48	42	+6	54	
9	Melilla	38	13	13	12	47	47	0	52	
10	Écija Balompié	38	13	13	12	52	47	+5	52	
11	Ceuta	38	13	13	12	38	33	+5	52	
12	Baza	38	13	13	12	51	46	+5	52	
13	Granada	38	14	9	15	39	36	+3	51	
14	Alcalá	38	13	10	15	45	47	−2	49	
15	Mérida	38	14	6	18	34	44	−10	48	
16	Extremadura (R)	38	12	9	17	39	59	−20	45	Qualification to relegation playoffs
17	Cerro Reyes (R)	38	11	8	19	31	59	−28	41	Relegation to Tercera División
18	Villanueva (R)	38	9	8	21	41	55	−14	35	Relegation to Tercera División
19	Villanovense (R)	38	5	7	26	39	76	−37	22	Relegation to Tercera División
20	Málaga B (R)	38	3	5	30	21	80	−59	14	Relegation to Tercera División

Rules for classification: 1st points; 2nd head-to-head; 3rd goal difference; 4th goals scored.
(P) Promoted; (R) Relegated

=== Results ===
Home \ Away	AGU	ALC	BAZ	CAR	CDR	CEU	COR	ECI	EXT	GRA	JAE	LIN	MGA	MAR	MEL	MER	POR	SAT	VNV	VNA
Águilas	—	3–4	2–2	2–1	2–1	2–0	0–1	2–1	2–1	1–0	1–1	1–2	1–0	0–1	2–0	3–0	3–2	1–2	0–2	3–1
Alcalá	1–1	—	1–2	1–2	2–0	2–1	1–1	3–2	0–1	1–0	0–3	2–1	1–1	1–1	0–1	0–0	1–0	0–1	2–1	2–1
Baza	1–0	3–1	—	0–0	1–0	0–0	1–2	0–1	2–2	1–1	1–2	3–1	2–0	1–1	0–0	3–1	0–1	0–1	2–1	2–2
Cartagena	2–2	3–1	2–2	—	3–0	2–1	1–1	2–1	3–1	1–0	3–0	0–3	5–0	2–0	2–1	1–0	2–0	1–0	2–0	4–1
Cerro de Reyes	1–0	2–0	0–0	2–1	—	0–0	0–0	0–2	1–0	1–0	3–1	1–1	1–0	0–1	2–5	2–1	2–3	1–5	0–0	1–0
Ceuta	1–0	1–1	1–0	0–0	3–0	—	1–1	0–0	1–1	3–1	1–1	0–2	2–0	1–2	3–0	0–0	1–2	0–1	1–0	2–0
Córdoba	2–1	4–1	2–2	4–2	4–0	4–0	—	2–1	3–1	2–0	1–1	3–3	5–2	2–1	1–2	1–0	1–1	2–0	3–2	3–0
Écija	2–1	0–0	1–2	2–3	1–1	2–1	1–0	—	5–1	1–1	3–3	1–1	4–2	0–0	1–0	2–1	2–1	0–0	0–0	2–0
Extremadura	0–2	2–4	1–1	2–1	2–1	0–1	2–1	2–1	—	1–2	1–3	1–0	2–0	2–1	2–1	1–2	2–2	0–0	0–0	0–3
Granada	3–0	2–1	1–1	1–1	3–0	1–1	2–1	2–1	2–1	—	1–2	1–2	4–0	1–2	1–0	2–1	0–1	2–0	1–0	1–0
Real Jaén	0–2	1–0	2–0	2–2	2–1	2–0	3–1	1–1	1–1	0–0	—	1–0	1–0	1–0	3–1	0–2	1–1	1–1	2–1	0–0
Linares	1–1	1–0	3–1	1–1	7–1	2–1	3–2	2–1	0–0	3–1	1–0	—	1–1	2–2	0–0	3–1	0–4	0–0	3–1	1–0
Málaga B	1–1	0–4	0–1	0–1	0–0	1–3	2–5	0–1	1–2	1–0	1–2	0–3	—	0–2	2–2	0–1	0–3	1–3	2–1	1–3
Marbella	0–0	0–2	2–1	3–2	1–0	0–0	3–0	1–1	1–0	0–0	0–2	1–2	2–0	—	4–1	0–1	0–1	3–0	2–3	0–0
Melilla	0–0	1–1	3–2	1–1	0–0	1–0	0–1	5–3	1–1	0–0	2–1	1–1	2–0	3–1	—	0–1	2–1	0–0	4–1	2–1
Mérida	0–1	2–0	0–3	0–0	2–1	1–3	0–3	2–3	0–1	1–0	1–0	0–0	1–0	0–0	1–0	—	0–1	0–1	1–1	3–2
Portuense	1–0	1–0	3–1	2–1	3–1	0–2	1–0	0–0	3–0	0–0	3–0	1–2	5–0	0–0	0–0	1–2	—	1–0	2–1	2–1
Sevilla Atl.	1–0	0–0	3–1	3–0	2–0	0–0	1–2	0–0	3–0	1–0	0–0	2–2	1–0	2–0	5–2	2–1	5–1	—	2–0	1–0
Villanovense	1–3	0–3	1–3	0–3	1–2	1–1	1–1	4–2	4–1	1–2	2–2	0–2	1–2	0–1	1–2	2–1	2–5	0–2	—	1–3
Villanueva	2–2	1–1	1–3	1–0	0–2	0–1	3–1	1–0	0–1	2–0	1–1	1–2	1–0	0–1	1–1	1–3	1–1	0–3	6–1	—

Source: BDFutbol
Legend: Blue = home team win; Yellow = draw; Red = away team win.

=== Top goalscorers ===
Goalscorers	Team	Goals
(Spain) Javi Moreno	Córdoba	24
(Spain) Xavier Molist	Cartagena	16
(Spain) Moncho	Racing Portuense	14
(Spain) Pepe Díaz	Écija Balompié	14
(Spain) José Cabello	Melilla	13

=== Top goalkeepers ===
Goalkeeper	Team	Goals	Matches	Average
(Spain) Alejandro Ávila	Marbella	32	37	0,86
(Spain) Manu	Linares	26	30	0,86
(Spain) Gustavo Alba	Granada	32	34	0,94
(Spain) Noé Calleja	Real Jaén	39	37	1,05
(Spain) Juan Carlos Caballero	Cartagena	31	29	1,06
