= Álex Colorado =

Spanish footballer

Personal information
- Full name: Alejandro Colorado Ramírez
- Date of birth: 9 June 1984 (age 42)
- Place of birth: Jerez de la Frontera, Spain
- Height: 1.82 m (5 ft 11 1/2 in)
- Position: Midfielder

Youth career
- Real Madrid

Senior career*
Years	Team	Apps	(Gls)
2003–2005	Real Madrid C	15	(2)
2005–2008	Xerez	23	(1)
2007	→ Granada (loan)	14	(0)
2007–2008	→ Mazarrón (loan)	33	(8)
2008–2009	Ceuta	13	(0)
2009–2010	Orihuela	22	(4)
2010	Sangonera	9	(0)
2010–2011	Lleida	33	(2)
2011–2012	Albacete	25	(2)
2012–2013	Lleida Esportiu	25	(3)
2013–2016	Reus	94	(19)
2016–2018	Llagostera	29	(3)
2018–2020	Xerez Deportivo	61	(9)
2020–2022	Xerez	44	(12)
2022–2024	Algaida	45	(8)
2024–2025	Portuense	26	(1)
- * Club domestic league appearances and goals as of 21:48, 22 June 2025 (UTC)

Alejandro 'Álex' Colorado Ramírez (born 9 June 1984 in Jerez de la Frontera, Province of Cádiz) is a Spanish footballer who plays as a midfielder.
