= Álex Cruz (footballer, born 1986) =

Spanish association football player

Personal information
- Full name: Alejandro Cruz Hernández
- Date of birth: 31 October 1986 (age 39)
- Place of birth: El Puerto de Santa María, Spain
- Height: 1.79 m (5 ft 10 in)
- Position: Left-back

Youth career
- Cádiz

Senior career*
Years	Team	Apps	(Gls)
2005–2007	Cádiz B		
2007–2008	Portuense	23	(0)
2008–2009	Gimnàstic	1	(0)
2009	→ Atlético Baleares (loan)	11	(1)
2009–2010	Atlético Ciudad	30	(0)
2010–2011	Lucena	30	(0)
2011–2012	Jaén	28	(0)
2012–2013	Avilés	29	(0)
2013–2015	Jaén	25	(0)
2015–2016	Toledo	19	(1)
2016	Llagostera	5	(0)
2016–2018	Melilla	43	(1)
2018–2021	Sanluqueño	67	(4)
2021–2022	Xerez Deportivo	15	(0)
Total		326	(7)
- * Club domestic league appearances and goals

Alejandro 'Álex' Cruz Hernández (born 31 October 1986) is a Spanish former footballer who played as a left-back.

== Club career ==
Born in El Puerto de Santa María, Province of Cádiz, Cruz finished his youth career with local Cádiz CF, and made his senior debut with the reserves in the 2005–06 season. He first arrived in the Segunda División B in summer 2007, joining Racing Club Portuense.

In August 2008, Cruz signed with Segunda División club Gimnàstic de Tarragona. He played his first professional match on 6 December, featuring the full 90 minutes in a 1–1 away draw against Deportivo Alavés. In January of the following year, he was loaned to CD Atlético Baleares in division three.

Cruz remained in the third tier the following years, with CF Atlético Ciudad, Lucena CF, Real Jaén and Real Avilés CF. On 9 July 2013 he returned to Jaén, recently promoted to the second league.
