= Fran Cortés =

Spanish footballer

Personal information
- Full name: Francisco José Cortés Vázquez
- Date of birth: 4 February 1986 (age 40)
- Place of birth: Cádiz, Spain
- Height: 1.73 m (5 ft 8 in)
- Position: Midfielder

Youth career
- Cádiz
- Balón Cádiz

Senior career*
Years	Team	Apps	(Gls)
2006–2008	Cádiz B		
2008–2011	Cádiz	52	(3)
2011–2012	Poli Ejido	14	(1)
2012	Huracán	9	(0)
2013–2014	Conil		
2018–2021	Puerto Real	63	(4)
2021–2022	UD Roteña	26	(0)
2022–2023	Puerto Real		
- * Club domestic league appearances and goals

Francisco José 'Fran' Cortés Vázquez (born 4 February 1986) is a Spanish former footballer who played as a midfielder.
