= Rodri (footballer, born 1985) =

Spanish footballer

Personal information
- Full name: Rodrigo Ángel Gil Torres
- Date of birth: 25 April 1985 (age 41)
- Place of birth: Cehegín, Spain
- Height: 1.76 m (5 ft 9 in)
- Position: Midfielder

Youth career
- Murcia

Senior career*
Years	Team	Apps	(Gls)
2002–2005	Murcia B		
2002–2003	Murcia	7	(0)
2005–2006	Real Madrid C		
2006–2007	Real Madrid B	34	(0)
2008–2009	Elche	33	(2)
2010	Atlético Ciudad	9	(0)
2010–2011	Orihuela	27	(3)
2011–2012	Alcalá	31	(0)
2012–2013	UCAM Murcia	29	(2)
2013–2014	Doxa	20	(0)
2014–2015	Omonia	12	(0)
2015–2016	Burgos	30	(2)
2016–2020	Orihuela	109	(5)
2020–2021	Mar Menor	3	(0)
- * Club domestic league appearances and goals

Rodrigo Ángel Gil Torres (born 25 April 1985), known as Rodri, is a Spanish former footballer who played as a midfielder.

== Club statistics ==
As of 31 August 2015

Club	Season	League			Cup		Continental		Total	
Club	Season	Division	Apps	Goals	Apps	Goals	Apps	Goals	Apps	Goals
Murcia	2002–03	Segunda División	7	0	1	0	—		8	0
Real Madrid B	2006–07	Segunda División	25	0	—		—		25	0
Real Madrid B	2007–08	Segunda División B	10	0	—		—		10	0
Real Madrid B	Total		35	0	—		—		35	0
Elche	2007–08	Segunda División	17	0	0	0	—		17	0
Elche	2008–09	Segunda División	16	2	4	0	—		20	2
Elche	Total		33	2	4	0	—		37	2
Atlético Ciudad	2009–10	Segunda División B	9	0	0	0	—		9	0
Orihuela	2010–11	Segunda División B	27	3	2	0	2 (Note: Appearances in Promotion Play-offs)	0	31	3
Alcalá	2011–12	Segunda División B	31	0	1	0	—		32	0
UCAM Murcia	2012–13	Segunda División B	29	2	0	0	—		29	2
Doxa	2013–14	Cypriot First Division	20	0	3	0	—		23	0
Omonia	2014–15	Cypriot First Division	12	0	3	0	6 (Note: Appearances in UEFA Europa League)	0	21	0
Burgos	2015–16	Segunda División B	5	0	0	0	—		5	0
Career total			208	7	14	0	8	0	230	7
