= Aloisio (footballer, born 1979) =

Spanish footballer

Personal information
- Full name: Mohamed Hamed Al-lal
- Date of birth: 25 March 1979 (age 47)
- Place of birth: Melilla, Spain
- Height: 1.86 m (6 ft 1 in)
- Position: Centre-back

Youth career
- 1995–1997: Ceuta

Senior career*
Years	Team	Apps	(Gls)
1997–1998	Valladolid B	0	(0)
1998–2000	Extremadura B	8	(0)
2000–2001	Andorra		
2001–2002	Reus	7	(0)
2003	Constancia		
2003–2004	Mérida	16	(1)
2004–2005	Fuenlabrada	32	(1)
2005–2008	Ourense	101	(4)
2008–2009	Sangonera	33	(4)
2009–2010	Atlético Ciudad	36	(6)
2010–2011	Badajoz	35	(8)
2012	Alcoyano	10	(1)
2012–2013	Ceahlăul	10	(1)
2013–2014	Melilla	20	(0)
Total		308+	(26+)

Managerial career
- 2014–2015: Piast Gliwice (assistant)
- 2016–2017: River Melilla
- 2020–2021: Melilla
- * Club domestic league appearances and goals

Mohamed Hamed Al-lal (born 25 March 1979), known as Aloisio (Arabic: اللُّوَيْسِيّ), is a Spanish former professional footballer who played as a central defender.

== Playing career ==
Born in Melilla, Aloisio made his senior debut with Real Valladolid Promesas in the 1997–98 season, in the Segunda División B. One year later, he moved to Segunda División's CF Extremadura, but failed to appear in any competitive matches for the club during his two-year tenure.

Aloisio spent the vast majority of his career in the lower leagues, representing FC Andorra, CF Reus Deportiu, CE Constància, Mérida UD, CF Fuenlabrada, CD Ourense, Sangonera Atlético CF, CF Atlético Ciudad and CD Badajoz. While with the latter team, he scored a career-best eight goals in 2010–11's third tier, including a hat-trick in a 3–1 home win against CD Lugo on 27 March 2011.

On 26 January 2012, Aloisio signed with CD Alcoyano of the second division. He made his professional debut on 11 February one month shy of his 33rd birthday, starting in a 2–0 home victory over UD Las Palmas, and scored his only goal on 3 March but in a 4–3 loss away to Villarreal CF B.

Aloisio moved abroad for the only time in his career on 18 September 2012, agreeing to a contract at Romanian Liga I side FC Ceahlăul Piatra Neamț. He returned to his country the following summer, signing for UD Melilla.

== Coaching career ==
Aloisio retired at the end of the 2013–14 campaign at the age of 35, and joined the coaching staff of his compatriot Ángel Pérez García at Polish club Piast Gliwice. On 13 August 2020, he was appointed head coach of Melilla in the third tier; before that, he worked with Real Madrid's academies in Lebanon, Qatar and the United Arab Emirates.
