= Gerrit Stoeten =

Spanish footballer (born 1986)

Gerrit
Personal information
- Full name: Jan Gerrit Stoeten Pérez
- Date of birth: 10 April 1986 (age 40)
- Place of birth: Torremolinos, Spain
- Height: 1.87 m (6 ft 1 1/2 in)
- Position: Defensive midfielder

Youth career
- Juventud Torremolinos

Senior career*
Years	Team	Apps	(Gls)
2005–2006	Fuengirola	14	(0)
2006–2008	Málaga B	44	(4)
2008–2009	Mérida	26	(0)
2009	Guijuelo	4	(0)
2010	Košice	14	(1)
2010–2011	Cerro Reyes	13	(0)
2011	Juventud Torremolinos	5	(3)
2011–2012	Marbella	36	(2)
2012	Estepona	7	(0)
2012–2014	El Palo	68	(17)
2014–2015	Numancia	14	(1)
2015–2016	Marbella	30	(1)
2016–2017	San Fernando	25	(2)
2017–2019	Ebro	70	(4)
2019–2020	Talavera	18	(0)
2020–2023	Juventud Torremolinos	78	(2)
2023	Alhaurín de la Torre	6	(0)
Total		472	(37)
- * Club domestic league appearances and goals

Jan Gerrit Stoeten Pérez (born 10 April 1986), known as Gerrit, is a Spanish former footballer who played as a defensive midfielder.

== Club career ==
Born in Torremolinos, Province of Málaga to a Dutch father and a Spanish mother, Gerrit spent the vast majority of his career in his country in the Segunda División B or lower, for example playing two years with Málaga CF's reserves. He was relegated from that league in 2007, and met the same fate with Mérida UD at the end of the 2008–09 season.

On 14 January 2010, Gerrit moved abroad and signed a contract with MFK Košice. He scored his only goal for the Slovak club on 24 April in a 2–0 home win against FK Senica, and featured regularly throughout the campaign (12 starts, 11 games complete) as the team finished in 11th position, barely avoiding Super Liga relegation.

In the summer, Gerrit returned to Spain and its lower leagues, splitting 2010–11 with AD Cerro de Reyes – again being relegated from the third tier – and amateurs Juventud de Torremolinos CF. He continued to compete in the third and fourth divisions the following seasons, representing UD Marbella, Unión Estepona CF and CD El Palo.

On 23 July 2014, Gerrit signed a 1+1 deal with Segunda División side CD Numancia. He made his official debut on 31 August, starting in a 2–1 away loss to Real Betis, and totalled 15 appearances across the season, scoring to open a 1–1 home draw with CD Leganés on 26 October.

Gerrit then returned to division three, going on to have spells at Marbella, San Fernando CD, CD Ebro and CF Talavera de la Reina.
