= Iván Buigues =

Spanish footballer (born 1996)

Personal information
- Full name: Iván Buigues Rico
- Date of birth: 10 August 1996 (age 30)
- Place of birth: Mutxamel, Spain
- Height: 1.87 m (6 ft 1 1/2 in)
- Position: Goalkeeper

Team information
- Current team: Orihuela
- Number: 1

Youth career
- 2003–2008: Hércules
- 2008–2012: Valencia
- 2012–2014: Hércules

Senior career*
Years	Team	Apps	(Gls)
2014–2018	Hércules	27	(0)
2018–2019	Logroñés	3	(0)
2019–2020	Intercity		
2020	Talavera	5	(0)
2020–2025	Águilas	147	(0)
2025–	Orihuela	33	(0)
- * Club domestic league appearances and goals as of 16 May 2026

Iván Buigues Rico (born 10 August 1996) is a Spanish footballer who plays as a goalkeeper for Segunda Federación club Orihuela.

== Club career ==
Born in Mutxamel, Valencian Community, Buigues played youth football for local Hércules CF from ages 7 to 12, and finished his development there after a four-year spell with neighbours Valencia CF. On 27 January 2014, he signed a new deal with the club running until 2016.

On 7 June 2014, while still a junior, Buigues made his only appearance as a professional, coming on as a late substitute for Oinatz Aulestia in a 1–2 home loss against FC Barcelona B in the Segunda División. He was definitely promoted to the first team in August, initially as second-choice.

In the 2018 off-season, Buigues joined UD Logroñés of Segunda División B. On 30 January 2020, he moved to CF Talavera de la Reina in the same league following a short stint with amateurs CF Intercity.
