= Ibán Espadas =

Spanish footballer

Personal information
- Full name: Ibán Espadas Zubizarreta
- Date of birth: 4 August 1978 (age 48)
- Place of birth: Tolosa, Spain
- Height: 1.80 m (5 ft 11 in)
- Position: Forward

Youth career
- Athletic Bilbao

Senior career*
Years	Team	Apps	(Gls)
1996–1998	Bilbao Athletic	53	(5)
1999–2000	Cartagena	44	(6)
2000–2001	Recreativo	6	(0)
2000–2001	→ Cultural Leonesa (loan)	34	(8)
2001–2003	Zaragoza B	39	(15)
2002–2005	Zaragoza	25	(4)
2003–2004	→ Cádiz (loan)	16	(4)
2004–2005	→ Almería (loan)	37	(5)
2005–2006	Ciudad Murcia	19	(1)
2006–2009	Orihuela	68	(22)
2009–2011	Pontevedra	62	(12)
2011–2012	Orihuela	25	(14)
2012–2014	Arroyo	36	(7)
Total		464	(103)

International career
1994–1995	Spain U16	7	(1)
1995	Spain U17	3	(0)
1996–1997	Spain U18	8	(0)
- * Club domestic league appearances and goals

Ibán Espadas Zubizarreta (born 4 August 1978) is a Spanish former professional footballer who played as a forward.

Across the two major levels of Spanish football, he appeared in 104 games and scored 14 goals over nine seasons. In La Liga, he represented Zaragoza.

== Club career ==
Espadas was born in Tolosa, Gipuzkoa. During his career, spent mainly in the second and third divisions, he also made seven La Liga appearances with Real Zaragoza, all in the 2003–04 season – he had previously contributed 18 and four goals to the Aragonese club's previous top-flight promotion.

An unsuccessful Athletic Bilbao youth graduate, Espadas also represented FC Cartagena, Recreativo de Huelva, Cultural y Deportiva Leonesa, Zaragoza B, Cádiz CF, UD Almería, Ciudad de Murcia, Orihuela CF (two spells), Pontevedra CF and Arroyo CP. He retired in June 2014, at the age of 35.
