= Félix Prieto =

Spanish footballer

Personal information
- Full name: Félix Jacinto Prieto Partido
- Date of birth: 24 May 1975 (age 51)
- Place of birth: Salamanca, Spain
- Height: 1.70 m (5 ft 7 in)
- Position: Forward

Team information
- Current team: Villajoyosa

Youth career
- 1991–1994: Real Madrid

Senior career*
Years	Team	Apps	(Gls)
1994–1995	Real Madrid C	4	(0)
1995–1996	Moscardó	12	(2)
1996–1997	Langreo	15	(0)
1997–1998	Plasencia	37	(8)
1998–2002	Gimnàstic	129	(20)
2002	Ciudad Murcia	10	(1)
2003	Reus	21	(5)
2003–2004	Novelda	37	(14)
2004–2006	Alicante	67	(12)
2006–2008	Alcoyano	58	(18)
2008–2010	Atlético Ciudad	54	(11)
2010–2012	La Nucía	?	(15)
2012–2013	El Campello	30	(13)
2013–2014	Villajoyosa		
Total		474	(119)
- * Club domestic league appearances and goals

Félix Jacinto Prieto Partido (born 24 May 1975) is a Spanish former footballer who played as a forward.

== Club career ==
Born in Salamanca, Region of León, Prieto played in Real Madrid's youth system, later appearing with the C-team at the same time of the likes of Álvaro Benito, Fernando Morán, Raúl or Víctor Sánchez. Upon leaving in 1995, he competed in the lower leagues.

Prieto's debut in the second division occurred in the 2001–02 season at the age of already 26, with Gimnàstic de Tarragona. He played 23 matches (only four starts, 649 minutes of action) and scored two goals, as the Catalans suffered relegation one year after promoting.

Prieto subsequently resumed his career in the third level, appearing in three promotion playoffs without succeeding, with Alicante CF – twice – and CD Alcoyano. Another of his teams, Ciudad de Murcia, promoted to division two in the 2002–03 campaign, but he had already left in mid-season to CF Reus Deportiu.

In 2009–10, 34-year-old Prieto contributed with eight goals in 29 appearances to help CF Atlético Ciudad finish seventh in the third division, only to be relegated due to financial irregularities. For the following season, he moved to the fourth level with CF La Nucía (sixth group).
