= Raúl Torres (footballer, born 1977) =

Spanish footballer

Personal information
- Full name: Raúl Torres Claverías
- Date of birth: 26 October 1977 (age 49)
- Place of birth: Madrid, Spain
- Height: 1.80 m (5 ft 11 in)
- Position: Defender

Team information
- Current team: Varea

Youth career
- Atlético Madrid

Senior career*
Years	Team	Apps	(Gls)
2000–2003	Atlético Madrid B	65	(0)
2000–2001	→ Murcia (loan)	10	(0)
2003–2004	Jerez	33	(1)
2004–2009	Ejido	106	(1)
2009–2013	Logroñés	113	(1)
2013–2014	Varea	28	(2)
- * Club domestic league appearances and goals

Raúl Torres Claverías (born 26 October 1977) is a Spanish former footballer. Mainly a central defender, he could also play as a full back in either side.
