= 2007 Segunda División B play-offs =

Spanish football league play-offs

The 2007 Segunda División B play-offs (Playoffs de Ascenso or Promoción de Ascenso) were the final playoffs for promotion from 2006–07 Segunda División B to the 2007–08 Segunda División. The four first placed teams in each of the four Segunda División B groups played the Playoffs de Ascenso and the four last placed teams in Segunda División were relegated to Segunda División B. It also decided the two teams which placed 16th to be relegated to the 2007–08 Tercera División.

The top four placed teams from each group in the Segunda División B played in the Liguilla de Ascenso. Each liguilla contained one team from each of the four regular season groups. Teams were then drawn to plan one another with the 1st placed team in each group playing the 4th placed team, and the 2nd placed playing 3rd. The winners of these ties then played each other with the winning team being promoted.

The teams finishing 16th in each group of the Segunda División B were drawn into 2 pairs, with the losing teams relegated to the Tercera División.

All ties were two-legged, with each team playing once at home. The winner of each tie was determined by aggregate score, with draws being separated by the away goals rule or a penalty shoot-out where necessary.

== Promotion play-offs ==
The regular season finished on the 27 May and the play-offs began on the 3 June.

=== Group A ===
Group	Place	Team
1	4th	Universidad LPGC
2	2nd	Burgos
3	3rd	Alcoyano
4	1st	Sevilla Atlético

==== Semifinals ====
Team 1	Agg.	Team 2	1st leg	2nd leg
Universidad LPGC	2–5	Sevilla Atlético	0–4	2–1
Alcoyano	0–0 (4–5 p)	Burgos	0–0	0–0

==== Final ====
Team 1	Agg.	Team 2	1st leg	2nd leg
Burgos	0–1	Sevilla Atlético	0–0	0–1

Promoted to Segunda División
Sevilla Atlético
(44 years later)

=== Group B ===
Group	Place	Team
1	1st	Pontevedra
2	3rd	Palencia
3	2nd	Huesca
4	4th	Córdoba

==== Semifinals ====
Team 1	Agg.	Team 2	1st leg	2nd leg
Córdoba	2–2 (a)	Pontevedra	0–0	2–2
Palencia	2–3	Huesca	1–1	1–2

==== Final ====
Team 1	Agg.	Team 2	1st leg	2nd leg
Córdoba	3-1	Huesca	2-0	1-1

Promoted to Segunda División
Córdoba
(2 years later)

=== Group C ===
Group	Place	Team
1	3rd	Racing Ferrol
2	4th	Real Unión
3	1st	Alicante
4	2nd	Linares

==== Semifinals ====
Team 1	Agg.	Team 2	1st leg	2nd leg
Real Unión	2–2	Alicante	1–0	1–2
Racing Ferrol	2–2 (4–3 p)	Linares	2–0	0–2

==== Final ====
Team 1	Agg.	Team 2	1st leg	2nd leg
Racing Ferrol	2-1	Alicante	2-0	0-1

Promoted to Segunda División
Racing Ferrol
(1 year later)

=== Group D ===
Group	Place	Team
1	2nd	Rayo Vallecano
2	1st	Eibar
3	4th	L'Hospitalet
4	3rd	Portuense

==== Semifinals ====
Team 1	Agg.	Team 2	1st leg	2nd leg
L'Hospitalet	0–2	Eibar	0–0	0–2
Portuense	2–4	Rayo Vallecano	0–2	2–2

==== Final ====
Team 1	Agg.	Team 2	1st leg	2nd leg
Rayo Vallecano	1–2	Eibar	1–0	0–2

Promoted to Segunda División
Eibar
(1 year later)

== Relegation play-off ==
=== Qualified teams ===
Group	Position	Team
1	16th	Pájara Playas Jandía
2	16th	Valladolid B
3	16th	Valencia Mestalla
4	16th	Extremadura

=== Matches ===
The losers of this tournament will be relegated to the 2007–08 Tercera División.

Team 1	Agg.	Team 2	1st leg	2nd leg
Pájara Playas Jandía	4–1	Extremadura	3–0	1–1
Valladolid B	3–1	Valencia Mestalla	1–1	2–0

Relegated to Tercera División
Valencia Mestalla	Extremadura
