= David Cabarcos =

Spanish footballer

Personal information
- Full name: David Cabarcos González
- Date of birth: 7 February 1977 (age 49)
- Place of birth: Oviedo, Spain
- Height: 1.84 m (6 ft 0 in)
- Position: Striker

Youth career
- Lugo

Senior career*
Years	Team	Apps	(Gls)
1996–1998	Lugo	23	(1)
1998–1999	Xove Lago		
1999–2003	Compostela	63	(9)
2000–2001	→ Pontevedra (loan)	20	(8)
2003–2004	Pontevedra	31	(5)
2004–2005	Ourense	31	(7)
2005–2007	Gramenet	52	(10)
2007	Alki Larnaca	?	(2)
2008	Badalona	15	(3)
2008–2009	Alzira	22	(9)
Total		257	(54)
- * Club domestic league appearances and goals

David Cabarcos González (born 7 February 1977) is a Spanish retired footballer who played as a striker.

== Football career ==
Born in Oviedo, Asturias, Cabarcos moved in the 1999 summer to SD Compostela in the second division, from Galician neighbours Pontevedra CF. During his spell with the former club, he was almost exclusively used as a backup to the likes of Vladimir Gudelj and Christopher Ohen, as his team suffered two relegations from that level during his spell.

Cabarcos then spent four years in division three, playing two seasons apiece for CD Ourense and UDA Gramenet. In 2007, aged 30, he moved abroad for the first time, joining Alki Larnaca FC, freshly promoted to the Cypriot First Division, but returned to his country after only a few months and signed with another side in the third tier, CF Badalona.

Cabarcos retired from football in March 2009, because of persistent problems in his tibia. He was by far the Valencian Community team's top scorer in only 22 matches, but they suffered relegation from the third level.
