= Dani Miguélez =

Spanish footballer

Personal information
- Full name: Daniel Miguélez Martínez
- Date of birth: 23 April 1985 (age 41)
- Place of birth: Cádiz, Spain
- Height: 1.80 m (5 ft 11 in)
- Position: Goalkeeper

Senior career*
Years	Team	Apps	(Gls)
2003–2007	Cádiz B		
2007–2011	Cádiz	27	(0)
2007–2008	→ Granada (loan)	0	(0)
2011–2012	Poli Ejido	16	(0)
2012	Andorra	14	(0)
2013–2014	Balzan	21	(0)
- * Club domestic league appearances and goals

Daniel "Dani" Miguélez Martínez (born 23 April 1985) is a Spanish former footballer who played as a goalkeeper.
