= Pedro Vega (footballer, born 1979) =

Spanish footballer

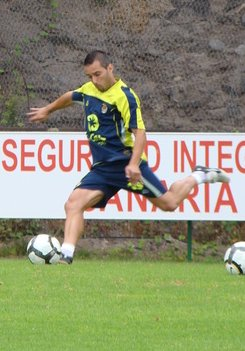
- Vega training with Las Palmas in 2009

Personal information
- Full name: Pedro Antonio Vega Rodríguez
- Date of birth: 19 July 1979 (age 47)
- Place of birth: Vega de San Mateo, Spain
- Height: 1.68 m (5 ft 6 in)
- Position: Winger

Youth career
- Las Palmas

Senior career*
Years	Team	Apps	(Gls)
1998–2000	Las Palmas B		
1999–2004	Las Palmas	65	(8)
1999–2000	→ Universidad LP (loan)	21	(4)
2000–2001	→ Granada (loan)	35	(5)
2001–2002	→ Universidad LP (loan)	34	(14)
2004–2008	Poli Ejido	138	(31)
2008–2009	Levante	25	(6)
2009–2013	Las Palmas	39	(2)
2010	→ Universidad LP (loan)	15	(2)
Total		372	(72)

International career
1999	Spain U20	2	(0)
- * Club domestic league appearances and goals

Pedro Antonio Vega Rodríguez (born 19 July 1979) is a Spanish former footballer who played as a left winger.

== Club career ==
Vega was born in Vega de San Mateo, Las Palmas, Canary Islands. During his career he played mainly for UD Las Palmas and neighbouring Universidad de Las Palmas CF, who acted as the former's farm team for several years. He amassed Segunda División totals of 267 games and 47 goals over the course of 12 seasons, representing in the competition Las Palmas, Polideportivo Ejido and Levante UD; he scored a career-best at the professional level 11 goals in the 2004–05 and 2005–06 campaigns, helping the second club finish 13th and 15th respectively.

Vega retired in June 2013 at the age of nearly 34, after a third stint with Las Palmas which consisted of three official matches – two in the Copa del Rey– and 15 minutes of action in his last year.
