= Julio Iglesias (footballer) =

Spanish footballer

Personal information
- Full name: Julio José Iglesias Rouget
- Date of birth: 26 September 1972 (age 54)
- Place of birth: Avilés, Spain
- Height: 1.81 m (5 ft 11 in)
- Position: Goalkeeper

Youth career
- Barcelona

Senior career*
Years	Team	Apps	(Gls)
1990–1995	Barcelona B	19	(0)
1991–1992	→ Avilés (loan)	10	(0)
1995–1996	Almería	34	(0)
1996–1997	Leganés	24	(0)
1997–2000	Albacete	91	(0)
2000–2002	Tenerife	26	(0)
2002–2003	Valladolid	0	(0)
2003–2004	Algeciras	15	(0)
2004–2007	Xerez	78	(0)
2007–2008	Córdoba	20	(0)
2008–2009	Atlético Ciudad	4	(0)
Total		321	(0)

International career
1987–1989	Spain U16	21	(0)
1988–1991	Spain U18	19	(0)
- * Club domestic league appearances and goals

Julio José Iglesias Rouget (born 26 September 1972) is a Spanish former professional footballer who played as a goalkeeper.

== Club career ==
Born in Avilés, Asturias, Iglesias spent most of his career in the Segunda División, with two stints in La Liga: in the 2001–02 season he appeared in 16 games for CD Tenerife, which were relegated, and played second-fiddle to Albano Bizzarri in the following campaign, playing no matches for Real Valladolid.

Over the course of 15 seasons, Julio Iglesias made exactly 300 appearances in the second tier, mainly for FC Barcelona B, Albacete Balompié and Xerez CD (three years apiece). He retired in June 2009 at the age of 36, then worked as a goalkeeper coach.

== Honours ==
Spain U16

- UEFA European Under-16 Championship: 1988
