= Jon Altuna =

Spanish footballer

Personal information
- Full name: Jon Altuna Mendizábal
- Date of birth: 24 June 1980 (age 46)
- Place of birth: Ibarra, Spain
- Height: 1.81 m (5 ft 11 1/2 in)
- Position: Attacking midfielder

Youth career
- Antiguoko

Senior career*
Years	Team	Apps	(Gls)
1999–2000	Logroñés	10	(0)
2000–2003	Aurrerá	79	(1)
2003–2006	Barakaldo	86	(12)
2006–2008	Eibar	68	(15)
2008–2009	Granada	35	(12)
2009–2012	Eibar	103	(41)
2012–2013	Amorebieta	36	(10)
Total		417	(91)
- * Club domestic league appearances and goals

Jon Altuna Mendizábal (born 24 June 1980 in Ibarra, Gipuzkoa) is a Spanish former professional footballer who played as an attacking midfielder.
