= Polideportivo Ejido =

Poli Ejido
- Full name: Poli Ejido 2012 Sociedad Deportiva
- Nickname: Poli
- Founded: 1969
- Dissolved: 2012
- Ground: Santo Domingo; El Ejido, Andalusia, Spain
- Capacity: 7,870
- 2011–12: 2ªB – Group 4, withdrawn
Home colours	Away colours

Poli Ejido 2012 Sociedad Deportiva was a Spanish football team based in El Ejido, Province of Almería, in the autonomous community of Andalusia. Founded in 1969 and dissolved in 2012, it held home matches at Estadio Municipal Santo Domingo, that seated 7,870 spectators.

The club played in pale blue shirts and white shorts, and spent seven seasons in Segunda División in the 2000s.

== History ==
Polideportivo Ejido was founded in 1969. After first reaching the fourth division in 1987, the club fluctuated between that and the third levels. From 1999 to 2001 it achieved two consecutive promotions, and would go on to have an uninterrupted seven-year spell in the second division.

On 29 October 2008, freshly relegated to division three, Poli trounced La Liga giants Villarreal CF 5–0 in the fourth round of the Spanish Cup, the first with teams from the top level (6–1 final aggregate). Two seasons later the two clubs met again in the tournament, but with a different outcome (3–1 on aggregate for the Valencian club).

Polideportivo Ejido was expelled from the third division competition midway through the 2011–12 season, after failing to report to two consecutive games. Overwhelmed by financial difficulties and without any players, the club folded soon afterwards.

In January 2012 it was reborn as CD El Ejido 2012, acquired by a group of business owners and headed by Manuel Amer. It keept the clothing and the 90% of the shield, only changing the typography.

== Seasons ==
=== Recent seasons ===
Season		Pos.	Pl.	W	D	L	GS	GA	P	Cup	Notes
2002–03	2D	13	42	12	16	14	36	45	52		
2003–04	2D	18	42	12	13	17	29	40	49		
2004–05	2D	13	42	12	16	14	41	45	52		
2005–06	2D	15	42	15	8	19	43	50	53		
2006–07	2D	10	42	16	10	16	52	50	58		
2007–08	2D	22	42	11	11	20	37	54	44		Relegated

=== Season to season ===
Season	Tier	Division	Place	Copa del Rey
1971–72	5	2ª Reg.	1st	
1972–73	4	1ª Reg.	20th	
1973–74	5	2ª Reg.	13th	
1974–75	5	2ª Reg.	1st	
1975–76	5	1ª Reg.	7th	
1976–77	5	1ª Reg.	5th	
1977–78	5	Reg. Pref.	17th	
1978–79	6	1ª Reg.	6th	
1979–80	6	1ª Reg.	15th	
1980–81	5	Reg. Pref.	20th	
1981–82	5	Reg. Pref.	11th	
1982–83	5	Reg. Pref.	14th	
1983–84	5	Reg. Pref.	17th	
1984–85	6	1ª Reg.	1st	
1985–86	5	Reg. Pref.	5th	
1986–87	5	Reg. Pref.	1st	
1987–88	4	3ª	3rd	
1988–89	4	3ª	7th	
1989–90	4	3ª	3rd	
1990–91	4	3ª	2nd	Second round
1991–92	3	2ª B	5th	Second round

Season	Tier	Division	Place	Copa del Rey
1992–93	3	2ª B	14th	Third round
1993–94	3	2ª B	17th	Fifth round
1994–95	4	3ª	3rd	First round
1995–96	4	3ª	1st	
1996–97	3	2ª B	17th	Second round
1997–98	4	3ª	2nd	
1998–99	4	3ª	2nd	
1999–2000	4	3ª	1st	
2000–01	3	2ª B	2nd	Round of 32
2001–02	2	2ª	18th	Round of 32
2002–03	2	2ª	13th	Round of 32
2003–04	2	2ª	18th	Round of 32
2004–05	2	2ª	13th	Round of 32
2005–06	2	2ª	15th	First round
2006–07	2	2ª	11th	Third round
2007–08	2	2ª	22nd	Second round
2008–09	3	2ª B	3rd	Round of 16
2009–10	3	2ª B	4th	Third round
2010–11	3	2ª B	14th	Round of 32
2011–12	3	2ª B	(W)	

- 7 seasons in Segunda División
- 9 seasons in Segunda División B
- 9 seasons in Tercera División

== Last squad ==
The numbers are established according to the official website:www.poliejido.com and www.rfef.es

Note: Flags indicate national team as defined under FIFA eligibility rules; some limited exceptions apply. Players may hold more than one non-FIFA nationality.

No.	Pos.	Nation	Player
—	GK	ESP	Álvaro
—	GK	ESP	Dani
—	GK	ESP	Néstor
—	DF	ESP	Raúl Fernández
—	DF	ESP	Callejón
—	DF	ESP	Dani Salas
—	DF	ESP	David Fernández
—	DF	ESP	Óscar
—	DF	ESP	Paco
—	DF	ESP	Pepe
—	DF	ESP	Samir
—	MF	ESP	Dani Cara

No.	Pos.	Nation	Player
—	MF	ESP	Fran Cortés
—	MF	ESP	Javilillo
—	MF	ESP	Juanito
—	MF	ESP	Moreno
—	MF	ESP	Quiles
—	MF	ESP	Saúl
—	MF	ESP	Ximo Forner
—	MF	ESP	Rubén Rivera
—	FW	ESP	Cantarutti
—	FW	ESP	Fran Amado
—	FW	ESP	Prieto

== Honours / Achievements ==
- Tercera División: 1995–96, 1999–2000
- Segunda División: Promotion 2000–01

== Famous players ==
Note: this list includes players that have played at least 100 league games and/or have reached international status.

- (Andorra) Marc Bernaus
- (Andorra) Ildefons Lima
- (Argentina) Mariano Toedtli
- (Spain) (Australia) José Bello Amigo
- (Colombia) Avimiled Rivas
- (Croatia) Jurica Vučko
- (Hungary) László Éger
- (Mexico) Antonio de Nigris
- (Mexico) Gerardo Torrado
- (Nigeria) Stephen Sunday
- (Poland) Mirosław Trzeciak
- (Portugal) José Calado
- (Spain) Carlos García Badías
- (Romania) Bogdan Mara
- (Romania) Dennis Şerban
- (Serbia) Risto Vidaković
- (Spain) Kike Burgos
- (Spain) Marcelino Elena
- (Spain) Carlos Llorens
- (Spain) Víctor Salas
- (Spain) Pedro Vega
- (Ghana) Addison Kwaku Ayitey

(Venezuela) Félix Hernández

== See also ==
- Polideportivo Ejido B, reserve team
