= Pepe Alcaide =

Spanish footballer (born 1979)

Personal information
- Full name: José Alcaide Muñoz
- Date of birth: 8 February 1979 (age 47)
- Place of birth: Madrid, Spain
- Height: 1.75 m (5 ft 9 in)
- Position: Right back

Senior career*
Years	Team	Apps	(Gls)
2001–2002	Onda	34	(0)
2002–2003	Jaén	14	(0)
2003–2005	Novelda	72	(1)
2005–2006	Zamora	31	(0)
2006–2007	Logroñés	34	(0)
2007–2012	Ponferradina	142	(2)
2012–2014	Borriol	36	(1)
Total		363	(4)
- * Club domestic league appearances and goals

José "Pepe" Alcaide Muñoz (born 8 February 1979 in Madrid) is a Spanish retired footballer who played as a right back.
