= CF Atlético Ciudad =

Spanish football club

Atlético Ciudad
- Full name: Club de Fútbol Atlético Ciudad
- Founded: 2003 (as EMD Lorquí); 2007 (merge)
- Dissolved: 2010
- Ground: Juan de la Cierva, Lorquí, Murcia, Spain
- Capacity: 1,600
- 2009–10: 2ªB - Group 4, 7th
Home colours	Away colours

Club de Fútbol Atlético Ciudad was a Spanish football club based in Murcia, in the autonomous community of Murcia. Founded in 2007 after the merger of Ciudad de Murcia and EMD Lorquí, it played its last season in Segunda División B (group IV), holding home matches at Estadio Juan de la Cierva, with a 1,600-seat capacity. The club was refounded in 2010 as CAP Ciudad de Murcia.

== History ==
On 6 June 2007, Ciudad de Murcia was acquired by an investor from Granada, transferring to that city and being renamed it Granada 74 CF. As the second division team moved to Granada, the reserve team and the Escuela Municipal Deporte Lorquí (founded in 2003) merged, and CA Ciudad de Lorquí was founded.

On 31 October 2008, the team changed its name to Club de Fútbol Atlético Ciudad. Two years later, on 1 August, it was forced to relegate to Tercera División after not being able to pay a debt of €700,000 euros, which consequently led to the club being dissolved.

=== Club names ===
- Escuela Municipal Deporte Lorquí (2003–07)
- Club Atlético Ciudad de Lorquí (2007–08)
- Club de Fútbol Atlético Ciudad (2008–10)

== Season to season ==
Season	Tier	Division	Place	Copa del Rey
2003–04	6	1ª Terr.	1st	
2004–05	5	Terr. Pref.	1st	
2005–06	4	3ª	15th	
2006–07	4	3ª	14th	
2007–08	4	3ª	1st	
2008–09	3	2ª B	8th	
2009–10	3	2ª B	7th	

- 2 seasons in Segunda División B
- 3 seasons in Tercera División

== Last squad (2009–10) ==
Note: Flags indicate national team as defined under FIFA eligibility rules; some limited exceptions apply. Players may hold more than one non-FIFA nationality.

No.	Pos.	Nation	Player
1	GK	ESP	Miguel Zapata
2	DF	ESP	Óscar Valero
3	DF	ESP	Antonio Ayala
4	DF	ESP	Aloisio
5	DF	ESP	Alberto Bayón
6	MF	ESP	Borja Yebra
7	MF	ESP	Iván Boniquet
8	FW	ESP	Félix Prieto
9	FW	ESP	Josu Santamaría
11	MF	ESP	Óscar
13	FW	ESP	José Plata (on loan from Granada)
14	DF	ESP	Álex Cruz

No.	Pos.	Nation	Player
15	DF	ESP	Fran González
16	MF	ESP	Raúl Barcos
17	MF	ESP	Guille Roldán
18	MF	ESP	Josemi
20	FW	ESP	Emilio Guerra
21	MF	ESP	Edgar
22	MF	ANG	Danilson
23	DF	ESP	Álex Bolaños
25	GK	ESP	Javi Muñoz
26	MF	ESP	Nacho
—	FW	SWE	Darko Lukanović
—	MF	ESP	Rodri

== Famous players ==
- (Argentina) Cristian Díaz
- (Spain) Julio Iglesias
- (Sweden) Patrick Amoah

== See also ==
- CAV Murcia 2005, the club's volleyball section.
