= Orihuela CF =

Association football club in Spain

Orihuela
- Full name: Orihuela Club de Fútbol
- Nickname: El Escorpión (The Scorpion)
- Founded: 1993; 33 years ago
- Ground: Los Arcos, Orihuela, Valencia, Spain
- Capacity: 7,000
- President: Antonio Felices
- Head coach: Sergi Guilló
- League: Segunda Federación – Group 5
- 2024–25: Segunda Federación – Group 4, 10th of 18
- Website: www.orihuelaclubdefutbol.com
Home colours	Away colours

Orihuela Club de Fútbol is a Spanish football team based in Orihuela, in the Valencian Community. Founded in 1993 it plays in Segunda Federación – Group 5, holding home games at Estadio Municipal Los Arcos, with a capacity of 7,000 seats.

== History ==
On 4 August 1993, the chairman of Orihuela Juventud y Deportes, Pedro Albarracín, received a notification from the Valencian Community Football Federation, allowing him to change the name of the club to Orihuela Club de Fútbol. A few months before, when the youth team of Atlético Orihuela was promoted to Liga Nacional Juvenil de Fútbol, the presidents of both clubs, Albarracín and Francisco Polín González, agreed on a merge, which created Orihuela Club de Fútbol.

The first club home kit was orange shirts and white shorts, as former Orihuela Juventud y Deportes, because the historical Orihuela Deportiva CF (founded in 1944) was still competing. Once the latter disappeared in 1996, Orihuela CF adopted their colours (yellow and blue) and became the most important local team.

From 1993 to 1997 the club played in Primera Regional. At the end of the 1996–97 campaign, new chairman Ángel Fenoll "acquired" the place of Club Deportivo Los Garres in Tercera División, and Orihuela began their new era in Spain's national football.

It was with Paco Gómez as club owner that the side reached Segunda División B for the first time in its history in 2002–03, after being defeated several times in the play-offs. However, a very bad season ended with the team back in the fourth level.

In the 2003–04 season things didn't change for the better, as Gómez became owner of FC Cartagena and focused his efforts on his new club, although he was still Orihuela's chairman. A year later, José Rodríguez acquired the team and, after two seasons in charge, it was promoted again to division three; however, under Rodríguez's management, Orihuela soon underwent financial problems because of its excessive expenses and, at the beginning of 2008–09, Antonio Pedrera, one of the co-owners, took charge and became the new chairman.

Orihuela managed to stay up in the third division after a great comeback during the second half of the season. Luis Tevenet, who had begun the campaign as a player, became the new manager at the end of 2008, but his good work did not assure his job since new owners took control of the team for 2009–10, bringing with them a new manager and new players. It helped the club finish 7th in the Segunda División B. The key role in that team was played by Fleki.

Fernando Presa was the head of the new board, but when he and the rest of his associates had to pay Orihuela's debt in order to avoid relegation to the fourth level, they left the club. With little time to spare, the former board took charge again and paid the debt in the last hour of the deadline – the team was eventually allowed to stay in the third tier and Francisco Rodríguez was named the new president.

These matters had very negative consequences for the team, as the new board had to cancel some of the high contracts that Presa had offered to some of the new players and bring new faces when the team was already immerse in pre-season. In spite of these setbacks, Orihuela had an excellent first half of the season that all but almost guaranteed its presence in the third division for another year, and the board took advantage of this situation to release some of the best players such as Adrián Ripa, José Manuel Meca or Alejandro Colorado in order to reduce the wage budget – finally the team finished in seventh position, with Nacho Cobaleda becoming the first-ever elected president of the club during the campaign (he was replaced by Antonio Felices months later). In the 2018-19 season the club won Tercera División, Group 6 and was promoted to Segunda División B.

=== Club background ===
- Orihuela Deportiva CF – (1944–95)
- Orihuela Club de Fútbol – (1993–)

== Season to season ==
Season	Tier	Division	Place	Copa del Rey
1993–94	6	1ª Reg.	10th	
1994–95	6	1ª Reg.	12th	
1995–96	6	1ª Reg.	13th	
1996–97	6	1ª Reg.	9th	
1997–98	4	3ª	7th	
1998–99	4	3ª	1st	
1999–2000	4	3ª	4th	
2000–01	4	3ª	2nd	
2001–02	4	3ª	1st	
2002–03	3	2ª B	20th	Preliminary
2003–04	4	3ª	5th	
2004–05	4	3ª	5th	
2005–06	4	3ª	1st	
2006–07	3	2ª B	7th	Second round
2007–08	3	2ª B	5th	
2008–09	3	2ª B	11th	Round of 32
2009–10	3	2ª B	7th	
2010–11	3	2ª B	4th	Third round
2011–12	3	2ª B	2nd	Third round
2012–13	3	2ª B	19th	First round

Season	Tier	Division	Place	Copa del Rey
2013–14	4	3ª	3rd	
2014–15	4	3ª	7th	
2015–16	4	3ª	8th	
2016–17	4	3ª	5th	
2017–18	4	3ª	3rd	
2018–19	4	3ª	1st	
2019–20	3	2ª B	20th	Second round
2020–21	3	2ª B	9th / 7th	Second round
2021–22	5	3ª RFEF	6th	
2022–23	5	3ª Fed.	1st	
2023–24	4	2ª Fed.	4th	Second round
2024–25	4	2ª Fed.	10th	Second round
2025–26	4	2ª Fed.	8th	First round
2026–27	4	2ª Fed.		

- 10 seasons in Segunda División B
- 4 seasons in Segunda Federación
- 14 seasons in Tercera División
- 2 seasons in Tercera Federación/Tercera División RFEF

== Current squad ==
As of 21 February 2026

Note: Flags indicate national team as defined under FIFA eligibility rules; some limited exceptions apply. Players may hold more than one non-FIFA nationality.

No.	Pos.	Nation	Player
1	GK	ESP	Iván Buigues
2	DF	ESP	Diego Sheffield
3	DF	ESP	Nacho Vila
4	DF	ESP	Pedro Inglés
5	DF	ESP	Víctor Algisí
6	MF	ESP	Fran Rivera
7	FW	ESP	Rubén Solano
8	FW	ESP	José Lara
9	FW	ESP	Pipa
10	MF	ESP	Roberto Torres
11	FW	ESP	Joan Monterde
12	FW	ESP	Ángel Sánchez

No.	Pos.	Nation	Player
13	GK	ESP	Víctor Real
14	DF	ESP	Álvaro Peregrina (on loan from Getafe B)
15	DF	ESP	Álex Salto
16	MF	ESP	David Rodríguez
17	MF	URU	Gonzalo Miranda
19	DF	ESP	Juanma García
20	DF	ESP	Marc Sirera
21	DF	ENG	Louis Booker
22	FW	ESP	Camilo Mozo
23	FW	ESP	Javi Solsona
24	DF	ESP	Rubén García
25	GK	ESP	Eloy Moreno
