= 1978 in association football =

The following are the association football events of the year 1978 throughout the world.

== Events ==
- Copa Libertadores 1978: Won by Boca Juniors after defeating Deportivo Cali on an aggregate score of 4–0.
- England: Ipswich Town win the cup beating Arsenal F.C. 1–0 with the winning goal scored by Roger Osborne

== Winners club national championship ==
=== Africa ===
- Egypt: Zamalek

=== Asia ===
- Israel: Maccabi Tel Aviv F.C.
- Qatar: Al-Rayyan SC

=== Europe ===
- England: Nottingham Forest
- France: AS Monaco
- Hungary: Újpest FC
- Italy: Juventus
- Netherlands: PSV Eindhoven
- Romania: Steaua București
- Scotland: Rangers
- Spain: Real Madrid
- Turkey: Fenerbahçe
- West Germany: 1. FC Köln

=== North America ===
- Mexico: Tigres UANL
- United States / Canada:
  - New York Cosmos (NASL)

=== Oceania ===
- Australia: West Adelaide

=== South America ===
- Argentina
  - Metropolitano – Quilmes
  - Nacional – Independiente
- Brazil: Guarani
- Paraguay: Olimpia Asunción

== International tournaments ==
- African Cup of Nations in Ghana (March 5 – 16 1978)
  1. Ghana
  2. Uganda
  3. Nigeria
- 1978 British Home Championship (May 13 – May 20, 1978)

England

- FIFA World Cup in Argentina (June 1 – 25 1978)
  1. Argentina
  2. Netherlands
  3. Brazil

== Births ==
=== January ===
- January 1 – Philip Mulryne, Northern Irish footballer
- January 2 – Aimo Diana, Italian footballer and manager
- January 6 – Cédric Roussel, Belgian footballer (d. 2023)
- January 9
  - Gennaro Gattuso, Italian footballer and manager
  - Hamlet Barrientos, Bolivian footballer
- January 10
  - Gavin McCann, English footballer
  - Facundo Quiroga, Argentine footballer
- January 11
  - Emile Heskey, English footballer
  - Michael Duff, Northern Irish footballer and manager
- January 12 – Bonaventure Kalou, Ivorian footballer
- January 13
  - Chérif Touré Mamam, Togolese footballer
  - Tinga, Brazilian footballer
- January 17
  - Frode Kippe, Norwegian footballer
  - Patrick Suffo, Cameroonian footballer
- January 18 – Bogdan Lobonț, Romanian footballer and manager
- January 20
  - Salvatore Aronica, Italian footballer and manager
  - Luciano Zauri, Italian footballer and manager
- January 24 – Tomokazu Myojin, Japanese footballer
- January 25
  - Jason Roberts, English-Grenadian footballer
  - Robin Nelisse, Dutch Antillean international footballer
- January 26 – Nastja Čeh, Slovenian footballer
- January 27 – Gustavo Munúa, Uruguayan footballer and manager
- January 28
  - Gianluigi Buffon, Italian international goalkeeper
  - Jamie Carragher, English footballer
  - Papa Bouba Diop, Senegalese footballer (d. 2020)

=== February ===
- February 2
  - Barry Ferguson, Scottish footballer and manager
  - Claudio Morel, Paraguayan footballer and manager
- February 3 – Joan Capdevila, Spanish footballer
- February 5
  - Jairon Zamora, Ecuadorian footballer
  - Anvarjon Soliev, Uzbekistani footballer
- February 6 – Jacek Kuranty, Polish footballer
- February 7
  - Ivan Leko, Croatian footballer and manager
  - Daniel Van Buyten, Belgian footballer
- February 12 – Alain Masudi, Congolese footballer
- February 15 – Alejandro Lembo, Uruguayan footballer
- February 18 – Josip Šimunić, Croatian footballer
- February 19
  - Alioum Saidou, Cameroonian footballer
  - Michalis Konstantinou, Cypriot footballer
- February 24 – Leon Constantine, English footballer
- February 25
  - Yazid Mansouri, French-Algerian footballer
  - Yuji Nakazawa, Japanese footballer
- February 26
  - Abdoulaye Faye, Senegalese footballer
  - Mohammed Noor, Saudi Arabian footballer
- February 27
  - James Beattie, English footballer and manager
  - Kakha Kaladze, Georgian footballer

=== March ===
- March 9 – Lucas Neill, Australian footballer
- March 11 – Didier Drogba, Ivorian international
- March 12 – Sébastien Michalowski, retired French footballer
- March 14 – Antti-Jussi Karnio, Finnish footballer
- March 15 – Ramalho (Edson Ramalho dos Santos), Brazilian footballer
- March 24 – Tomáš Ujfaluši, Czech footballer
- March 30 – Mauricio Rojas, Chilean footballer
- March 31
  - Stephen Clemence, English footballer and coach
  - Jérôme Rothen, French international

=== April ===
- April 1 – Antonio de Nigris, Mexican international striker (d. 2009)
- April 2
  - Erivelton, Brazilian former footballer
  - Radim Novák, Czech goalkeeper (d. 2020)
- April 18 – Stéphane Lucas, French former professional footballer
- April 30 – Simone Barone, Italian footballer

=== May ===
- May 13 – Ilya Kazakov, former Russian football player
- May 16
  - Edu, Brazilian football player and manager
  - Lionel Scaloni, Argentine footballer and manager
- May 17 – Paddy Kenny, Irish footballer
- May 17 – Ricardo Carvalho, Portuguese footballer
- May 30
  - Barney Marman, Motswana former footballer
  - Nicolás Olivera, Uruguayan footballer

=== June ===
- June 9 – Miroslav Klose, German footballer and manager
- June 13 – Aleksei Brikov, former Russian footballer
- June 17 – Vladimir Buss, former Russian footballer
- June 20 – Frank Lampard, English footballer and manager
- June 21 – Hatem Aqel, Jordanian footballer
- June 23 – Diego Rangel, Spanish retired professional footballer
- June 30 – Vedat Kapurtu, Turkish footballer

=== July ===
- July 4 – Manfred Razenböck, Austrian former footballer
- July 15 – Antonio Sambruno, Spanish former professional footballer
- July 22 – Dennis Rommedahl, Danish footballer
- July 28 – Emmanuel Gros, retired French footballer

=== August ===
- August 4 – Talinda Nyathi, Motswana former footballer
- August 5 – Walid Chattaoui, Tunisian retired footballer and manager
- August 16 – Héctor Bosque, Spanish retired footballer

=== September ===
- September 6
  - Éric Kossingou, French former professional footballer
  - Homare Sawa, Japanese footballer
- September 11
  - Dejan Stanković, Serbian footballer and manager
  - Pablo Contreras, Chilean footballer
- September 15
  - Eiður Guðjohnsen, Icelandic footballer and manager
  - Marko Pantelić, Serbian footballer
- September 17 – Arne Slot, Dutch football player and manager
- September 18
  - Ryan Lowe, English footballer and manager
  - Augustine Simo, Cameroonian footballer
- September 22 – Harry Kewell, Australian footballer and manager
- September 25 – Hakim Bouchouari, Belgian former professional footballer

=== October ===
- October 3
  - Gerald Asamoah, German footballer
  - Claudio Pizarro, Peruvian footballer
  - Ricardo Rocha, Portuguese footballer
- October 6
  - Ankyofna Encada, Bissau-Guinean former footballer
  - Carl Hoefkens, Belgian footballer and manager
- October 9 – Oscar Ewolo, Congolese footballer
- October 11 – Kali, Angolan footballer
- October 13 – Markus Heikkinen, Finnish footballer
- October 15 – Boško Balaban, Croatian footballer
- October 17
  - Lars Hirschfeld, Canadian soccer player
  - Kevin Lisbie, English-Jamaican footballer
- October 18 – Igor Lebedev, Russian professional football coach and former player
- October 22 – Chaswe Nsofwa, Zambian footballer (d. 2007)
- October 23
  - Jimmy Bullard, English footballer and manager
  - Archie Thompson, Australian footballer
- October 24 – Carlos Edwards, Trinidadian footballer
- October 30 – Gerardo Seoane, Swiss footballer and manager
- October 31 – Marek Saganowski, Polish footballer and manager

=== November ===
- November 4 – Roman Hupf, Austrian footballer
- November 7
  - Mohamed Aboutrika, Egyptian footballer
  - Rio Ferdinand, English footballer
  - Jan Vennegoor of Hesselink, Dutch footballer
- November 8
  - Tim de Cler, Dutch footballer
  - Ali Karimi, Iranian footballer and manager
- November 10 – Nadine Angerer, German footballer
- November 11 – Erik Edman, Swedish footballer
- November 12
  - Eric Addo, Ghanaian footballer
  - Mista, Spanish footballer
- November 18 – Damien Johnson, Northern Irish footballer
- November 26 – Andrejs Rubins, Latvian footballer and manager (d. 2022)
- November 28 – Mehdi Nafti, Tunisian footballer and manager
- November 29
  - Dimitrios Konstantopoulos, Greek footballer
  - Andriy Vorobey, Ukrainian footballer

=== December ===
- December 4 – Michael Ricketts, English footballer
- December 5 – Marcelo Zalayeta, Uruguayan footballer
- December 8 – John Oster, English-Welsh footballer
- December 17 – Patricia Pérez, Mexican female footballer
- December 23 – Nicolás Suárez, Bolivian footballer
- December 24 – Ghislain Bagnon, French former professional footballer
- December 29
  - Victor Agali, Nigerian footballer
  - Kieron Dyer, English footballer

== Deaths ==
=== January ===
- January 3 – Rubén Morán, Uruguayan striker, winner of the 1950 FIFA World Cup. (47)

=== May ===
- May 8 – Juan Evaristo, Argentine midfielder, runner up of the 1930 FIFA World Cup, part of the first sibling to ever play a World Cup Final. (75)

=== June ===
- June 2 – Santiago Bernabéu (82), Spanish footballer, coach and president.

=== July ===
- July 13 – George Reader (81), English football referee

=== August ===
- August 5 – Ernst Melchior, Austrian footballer
- August 11 – Mario Varglien, Italian midfielder, winner of the 1934 FIFA World Cup. (72)
- August 15 – Leo Lemešić, Croatian football player and manager
- August 31 – Ángel Bossio, Argentine Goalkeeper, runner-up of the 1930 FIFA World Cup. (73)

=== September ===
- September 15 – Ricardo Zamora, Spanish footballer
- September 25 – Luigi Allemandi, Italian defender, winner of the 1934 FIFA World Cup. (74)

=== November ===
- November 18 – Pablo Dorado, Uruguayan striker, winner of the 1930 FIFA World Cup and first player ever to score in a World Cup Final. (70)

=== December ===
- December 5 – Carlos Riolfo, Uruguayan midfielder, winner of the 1930 FIFA World Cup. (73)
- December 6 - Antonietta Cherillo
