= Mata =

Mata or MATA may refer to:

== Places ==
- Mata, Iran, a village in Kerman Province, Iran
- Mata, Israel, a Moshav in the Judaean Mountains, south-west of Jerusalem, not far from Beit Shemesh
- Mata, Rio Grande do Sul, town in Brazil
- Mata Island, in the Hudson Bay of Nunavut, Canada
- Mata River, of the East Coast of North Island, New Zealand
- Mata, Afghanistan
- Mata, in Castelo Branco, Portugal
- Mata, Dianbai County (马踏镇), town in Guangdong, China

== People ==
- Mata (surname), for people with the surname Mata
- Mata Amritanandamayi (born 1953), Hindu spiritual leader and guru
- Mata Hari (1876–1917), stage name of exotic dancer, courtesan and spy Margaretha Zelle
- Mata Sundari, Mata Jito, and Mata Sahib Kaur, the wives of Sikh guru Gobind Singh; according to one theory, the first two are the same person
- Mata Tripta, mother of Guru Nanak Dev, the founder of Sikhism
- Mata (rapper) (born 2000), Polish rapper

== Entertainment ==
- Maharashtra Times, colloquially Ma Ta, a Marathi newspaper based in Mumbai, India
- Mata (1942 film), a Bollywood film
- Mata (2006 film), a Kannada language film
- Mata (2022 film), a Kannada language film
- MATA Festival, short for Music at the Anthology, Inc., a festival of contemporary classical music based in New York
- Mata (album), a 2022 album by M.I.A.

== Other uses ==
- Memphis Area Transit Authority, the operator of public transit in Memphis, Tennessee, U.S.
- McKinney Avenue Transit Authority, a streetcar operator in Dallas, Texas, U.S.
- Mata, may refer to Mataji
  - Hindi term for mother - for example Skandamata, the mother of war god Skanda
  - Devi in Hindu religion
- Mata (cicada), a genus of cicadas
- Mata (programming language)

== See also ==
- La Mata (disambiguation)
- Mata mata, a freshwater South American turtle
- Matha, is a Hindu religious institution
- Matas (disambiguation)
- Matos (disambiguation)
