= Antonio de Martí Franqués =

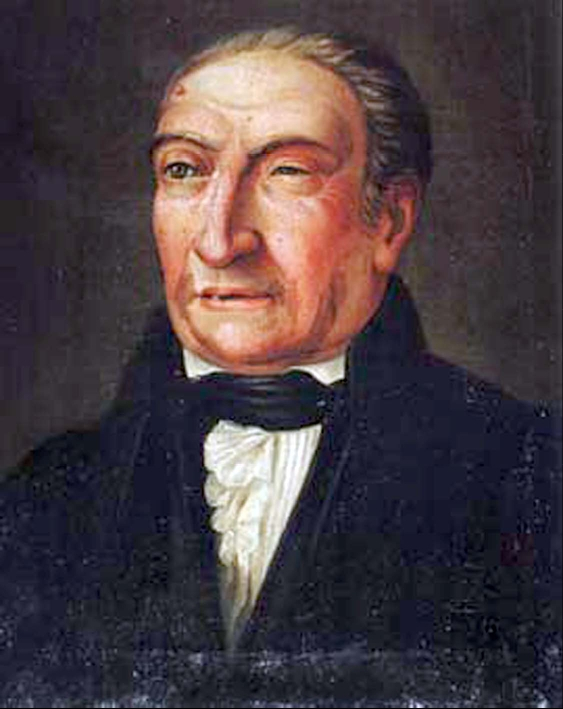
A portrait by Josep Arrau

Antonio de Martí Franqués, Antoni Martí i Franquès or Marti d'Ardenya (14 June 1750 – 19 August 1832) was a noble and scientist who contributed to ideas in biology, geology, meteorology and chemistry from Spain, specifically the area of Catalonia. He was largely self-taught, amassed large collections of books, learned several European languages and conducted experiments to verify, establish and test his ideas at a time when claims were generally taken for granted.

Franqués was born in a noble Catalan Ardenya family from Altafulla, Tarragona. His father was involved in cotton textile manufacture. He learned several European languages including English, German and Italian and was largely self-taught although he briefly went to the University of Cervera. He also became a member of the Sociedad de Amigos del País, taking an interest in industries such as weaving, spinning and ceramics. After his son began to take care of his business, he was left with time for scientific enquiries. He established his own laboratory, obtaining barometers, vials and glassware from Josep Valls. In 1785 he analysed air and estimated that the "vital air" (oxygen) content was about 21 to 22 percent. In 1788 he made public demonstrations of his experiments. In 1791 he too an interest in plant reproduction and conducted experiments in plant hybridization. He attended the meetings of the Society of Friends held at Odón Ferrer's pharmacy, along with clergyman Torres Amat and doctor Pere Virgili. He also corresponded with scientists across Europe and read the works of others. He collaborated with Francesc Carbonell on experiments, corresponded on botany with Mariano Lagasca, José Cavanilles, Pere Abad, Pierre A. Pourret and Francesc Bahí. He took an interest in the measurement of the arc of the meridian of Paris, corresponding on the topic with Francesc Aragó and Jean-Baptiste Biot. He attended meetings of the Royal Academy of Natural Sciences and Art in Barcelona. A religious Catholic, he sometimes avoided publishing material that may conflict with the church and he routinely obtained material from France that had been banned by the church there. He believed in spontaneous generation of life from dead matter claiming that small single celled algae came out of nowhere. The Peninsular War (1808-1814) interrupted his work and he was injured and briefly imprisoned by the French. His wife Isable Mora died in 1824 and his subsequent work is largely unknown. He lived in Barcelona between 1823 and 1833. Only five works of his were published between 1787 and 1792. His other works have been examined from about 3000 handwritten pages of observations made when he was aged between 66 and 78 but a lot of material was later lost when the French invaded Tarragona. He died from a stroke in Tarragona. His personal library may have been purged by his descendants for fears of religious persecution.
