= Matas =

Matas is a name. Notable people with the name include:

== Surname ==
Matas may be a Czech surname, feminine form: Matasová.

- Adéla Matasová (born 1940), Czech sculptor, multimedia artist and professor at the Art Institute
- Carol Matas (born 1949), Canadian children's writer
- David Matas (born 1943), Canadian legal counsel and human rights activist
- Gaspar Matas (1878–1963), Spanish football pioneer
- Jaume Matas (born 1954), Spanish politician; President of the Balearic Islands
- Jiří Matas (born 1964), Czech scientist specialising in pattern recognition
- Mike Matas (born 1986), American user interface designer and icon artist
- Niccolò Matas (1798–1872), Italian architect
- Nikola Matas (born 1987), Croatian footballer
- Raúl Matas (1921–2004), Chilean journalist, and radio and television broadcaster.
- Risto Mätas (born 1984), Estonian javelin thrower
- Rudolph Matas (1860-1957), American surgeon
- Tyler Matas (born 1994), Filipino-American footballer

== Given name ==
- Matas Buzelis (born 2004), Lithuanian-American basketball player
- Matas Grigonis (1889–1971), Lithuanian writer, educator, ethnographer and naturalist
- Matas Jogėla (born 1998), Lithuanian basketball player
- Matas Jucikas (born 1994), Lithuanian basketball player
- Matas Macaitis (born 1988), Lithuanian artistic gymnast
- Matas Maldeikis (born 1980), Lithuanian politician
- Matas Metlevski (born 2003), Lithuanian actor
- Matas Šalčius (1890–1940), Lithuanian traveler, journalist, writer, and political figure
- Matas Skamarakas (born 1988), Lithuanian politician
- Matas Vokietaitis (born 2004), Lithuanian basketball player

== See also ==
- Matthew (name)
- Mata (disambiguation)
