= La Mata =

La Mata may refer to:

- La Mata, Dominican Republic, town in Sánchez Ramírez Province
- La Mata, Panama, a town in Veraguas Province
- La Mata (Grado), a parish of Grado, Asturias, Spain
- La Mata, Toledo, a municipality in Toledo, Spain
- La Mata de Ledesma, a town in Salamanca, Spain
- La Mata de Morella, a town in Ports, Castellón, Valencian Community, Spain
- La Mata de los Olmos, a municipality in Teruel, Aragon, Spain
- Torre La Mata, or La Mata, a town in Alicante Community, Spain
