= Igor Lebedev =

Igor Lebedev (Russian: Игорь Лебедев) may refer to:

- Igor Lebedev (footballer) (born 1978), Russian footballer
- Igor Lebedev (diplomat), Russian diplomat
- Igor Lebedev (politician) (born 1972), Russian politician
