= Ilya Kazakov =

Ilya Kazakov may refer to:

- Ilya Kazakov (footballer) (born 1978), Russian footballer
- Ilya Kazakov (journalist) (born 1972), Russian football commentator, TV presenter and journalist
