= Fourmidables =

Spanish a cappella band

Fourmidables is a Spanish a cappella quartet, created in Torrevieja, province of Alicante, in 2008. This quartet is a member of SABS (Spanish Association of Barbershop Singers). Fourmidables has twice been the silver medal winner at the Spanish Quartet Competition, and placed 5th in the 2013 European Barbershop Convention in Veldhoven, Netherlands.

== History ==
The story of this quartet starts in 2008, when started performing a 'pop-rock hits' show, versioned to Doo Wop style. In December 2009, Fourmidables produced its first Christmas album, entitled Sweet Christmas. In 2010, after being invited by the Spanish Association of Barbershop Singers to participate in its annual quartet competition, Fourmidables introduced themselves in this style of music, harmonically more complex and with a large following worldwide. New to this genre, Fourmidables nevertheless won second prize in the National Quartet Competition in 2011 and 2012 consecutively. For this reason, Fourmidables qualified for the European Convention Barbershop held in Veldhoven, Netherlands, 14–17 March 2013.

== Jump to Europe ==
Having won the silver medal in the Spanish contest, Fourmidables qualified for the European Barbershop Convention, where they had the opportunity to perform and compete against the best quartets on the continent. More than 1500 people gathered at the convention, including 27 choruses and 43 quartets, from all different European associations of Barbershop. Fourmidables placed 5th place in the category "Europe Male Quartets", with a score of 73.5%.

== The quartet today ==
Its members are Juan Chazarra (Bass), Eduardo Perez (Baritone), Santiago Sánchez (Lead) and Raul Anton (Tenor). Quartet activity ranges from solo concerts to performances in important choral events. Its current repertoire includes versions of famous songs from Disney films and musicals as well as standards of Elvis Presley, Frank Sinatra, etc.
