= Torrevieja =

- City and municipality
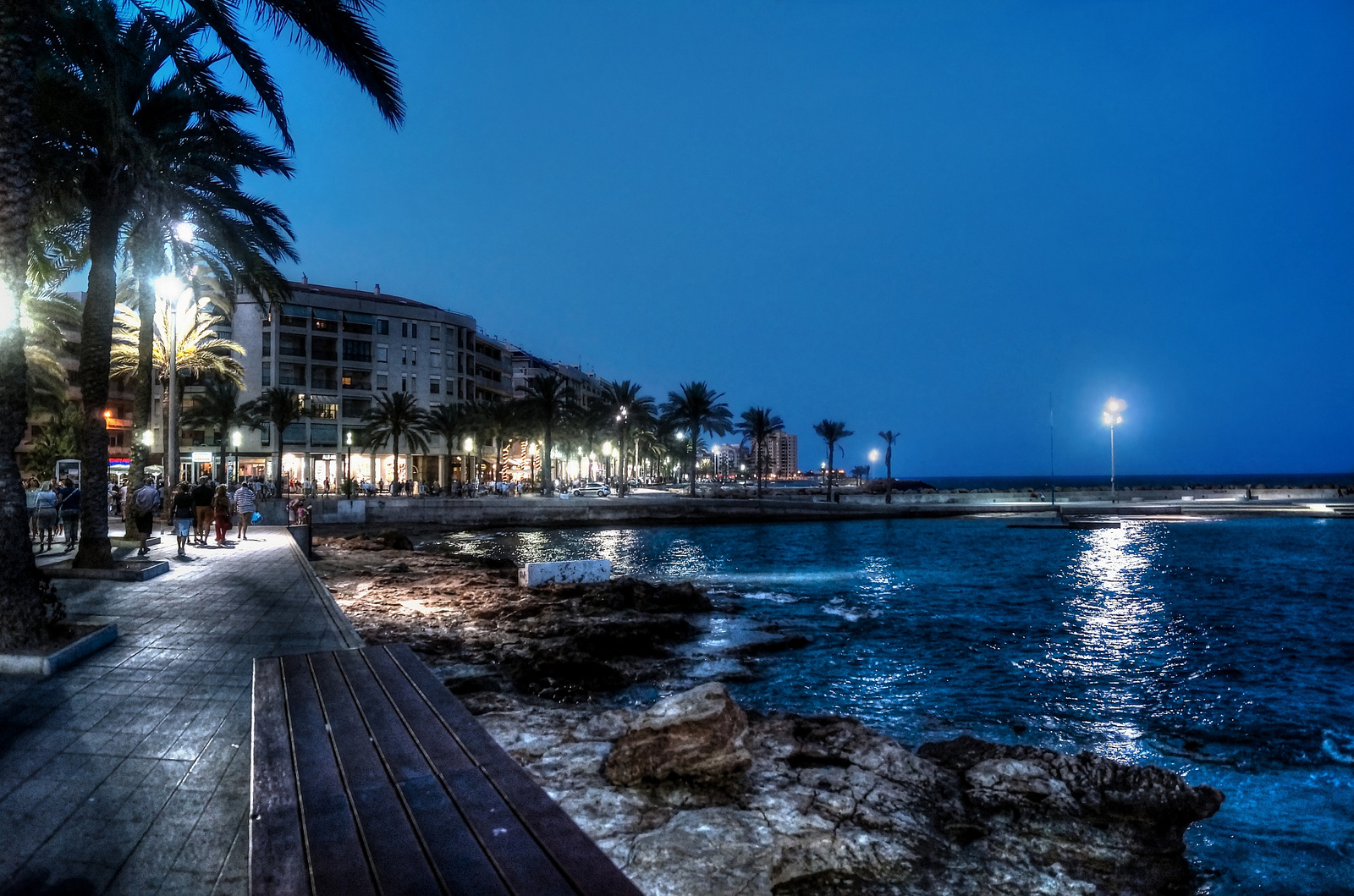
- Beach promenade in Torrevieja

- Flag Coat of arms
- Location of Torrevieja
- Location within Province of Alicante Location within Valencian Community Location within Spain
- Coordinates: 37°58′40″N 0°41′0″W
- Country: Spain
- Autonomous community: Valencian Community
- Province: Alicante
- Comarca: Vega Baja del Segura
- Judicial district: Torrevieja
- Founded: 19th century

Government
  - Mayor: Eduardo Dolón Sánchez (2019) (PP)

Area
  - Total: 71.44 km^{2} (27.58 sq mi)
- Elevation: 7 m (23 ft)

Population (2025-01-01)
  - Total: 98,533
  - Density: 1,379/km^{2} (3,572/sq mi)
- Demonyms: Torreviejan • torrevejense (Sp.)
- Official language(s): Spanish; Valencian
- Linguistic area: Spanish
- Time zone: UTC+1 (CET)
  - Summer (DST): UTC+2 (CEST)
- Postal code: 03181–03188
- Dialing code: 965; 966
- Website: www.torrevieja.es

Torrevieja (Note: Pronunciation of Torrevieja: Spanish: [toreˈβjexa]) is a Mediterranean-seaside city and municipality on the Costa Blanca, in the province of Alicante, Valencian Community, in southeastern Spain. The city is in one of the only Spanish-speaking areas of the Valencian Community.

Torrevieja lies about 50 kilometres south of the city of Alicante and had a population of around 90.1k residents as of the 2011 census; the latest official estimate (2019) is 83.3k inhabitants. Torrevieja was originally a salt-mining and fishing village, as it is located between the Mediterranean Sea and two large pink salt lakes known as Las Salinas de Torrevieja.

== History ==
Until the 1800s, Torrevieja was nothing more than random cottages and desolate dwellings near an ancient guard tower, which gave the town its name; torre vieja is Spanish for 'old tower'. In 1803, Charles IV decided to relocate the salt-mine production and offices from La Mata to the town of Torrevieja itself, allowing for the construction of new buildings and homes there. However, in 1829, the town was totally levelled by an earthquake, but the salt basins were soon recovered and business resumed.

In the 19th century, the salt was mainly shipped from the town by Swedish and Dutch merchant and cargo ships. At the time, there was only limited salt exportation to other regions of Spain, mainly to Galicia and, to a lesser extent, greater Valencia. Soon, with the turn of the 20th century, a quarter of all the salt sold in Spain was harvested directly from the Torrevieja lagoons, with the rest being exported to foreign markets. Today, it is still an important industry in Torrevieja and still a major employer. The city features a Museum of Sea and Salt.

In 1931, Alfonso XIII gave Torrevieja city status by special grant. During this period, there was also a growing market for locally-grown flax, hemp and cotton.

The municipality contains a water desalination plant, the largest of its kind in Europe. The company that built the plant, Acconia, maintains that the plant supplies water for customers across Northern Europe.

== Recent history ==
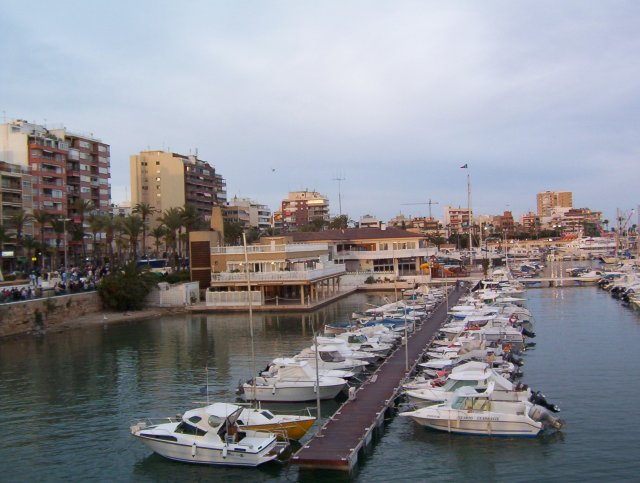
The Port

Since the mid-20th century, and entering into the 21st century, the local economy has grown exponentially due to the Mediterranean tourism industry, attracting visitors from elsewhere in Spain as well as tourists from abroad. Additionally, there is a strong contingent of British, Irish, German and Scandinavian citizens who stay in Torrevieja year-round, as well as many extended-vacationers using companies such as Airbnb, or property timeshares. There is also a growing number of Spaniards who own second homes in the city.

In 2004, Torrevieja had the largest number of British expats of all the Spanish municipalities (approx. 7,180). The high number of British residents from Yorkshire has led to Torrevieja being nicknamed 'Costa del Yorkshire' by some, and paella can be had served in giant Yorkshire puddings in many of the city's restaurants.

In 2001, the city was (along with Random House's Spanish subsidiary, Plaza & Janés) recognised with Spain's second-most important annual literary award, the Premio de Novela Ciudad de Torrevieja, and its poetry correlative, Premio de Poesía Ciudad de Torrevieja.

== Climate ==
Köppen-Geiger climate classification system classifies its climate as hot semi-arid (BSh), with dry, mild winters and hot, very dry summers. October is the wettest month.

Torrevieja mean sea temperature
Jan	Feb	Mar	Apr	May	Jun	Jul	Aug	Sep	Oct	Nov	Dec
15 °C (59 °F)	14 °C (57 °F)	15 °C (59 °F)	16 °C (61 °F)	18 °C (64 °F)	21 °C (70 °F)	23 °C (73 °F)	25 °C (77 °F)	24 °C (75 °F)	21 °C (70 °F)	18 °C (64 °F)	16 °C (61 °F)

Climate data for Torrevieja
Month	Jan	Feb	Mar	Apr	May	Jun	Jul	Aug	Sep	Oct	Nov	Dec	Year
Mean daily maximum °C (°F)	16.8 (62.2)	17.6 (63.7)	19.7 (67.5)	21.6 (70.9)	24.8 (76.6)	28.8 (83.8)	31.7 (89.1)	31.9 (89.4)	29.4 (84.9)	24.7 (76.5)	20.5 (68.9)	17.4 (63.3)	23.8 (74.8)
Daily mean °C (°F)	12.0 (53.6)	12.7 (54.9)	14.6 (58.3)	16.3 (61.3)	19.3 (66.7)	23.1 (73.6)	25.8 (78.4)	26.1 (79.0)	23.8 (74.8)	19.4 (66.9)	15.3 (59.5)	12.5 (54.5)	18.5 (65.3)
Mean daily minimum °C (°F)	7.2 (45.0)	7.8 (46.0)	9.5 (49.1)	11.0 (51.8)	13.8 (56.8)	17.5 (63.5)	19.9 (67.8)	20.4 (68.7)	18.2 (64.8)	14.2 (57.6)	10.2 (50.4)	7.6 (45.7)	13.2 (55.8)
Average precipitation mm (inches)	29 (1.1)	19 (0.7)	27 (1.1)	28 (1.1)	26 (1.0)	16 (0.6)	6 (0.2)	8 (0.3)	31 (1.2)	59 (2.3)	42 (1.7)	37 (1.5)	328 (12.8)
Average rainy days	5	4	4	5	4	3	1	1	3	4	5	5	44
Mean daily sunshine hours	6	7	7	9	10	11	12	11	9	7	6	6	8
Source 1: Climate-Data.org AEMET - Spanish Meteorology Agency
Source 2: Holiday Weather (sunshine hours, rain and rainy days)

== Population ==
In 1991, the city had 25,000 residents, two decades later close to 100,000. The father of the expansion was Pedro Ángel Hernández Mateo, mayor between 1988 and 2011. In order to encourage growth, all the land was rezoned fit for building, save for the two lagoons, designated natural parks in 1989.

The INE (Spanish Census) of 2005 showed that the city had 84,838 residents, and the ajuntament (district council area) had 95,531 residents. By January 2008 this figure had reached 103,154 of whom only 47,870 were Valencian or Spanish. More than 7,000 of the Spanish residents were originally from Madrid and not for nothing is Torrevieja known as la playa de Madrid (the beach of Madrid). However, by the 2011 census, the population had reduced to 90,097 and the latest estimate (for the start of 2019) is 83,337.

The city's age distribution is as follows:

Children and youths under 20 years: 19,674

Adults aged 20–40: 24,453

Adults aged 40–60: 32,212

Seniors aged 60–80: 24,331

Residents aged 80–100: 5,656

Residents aged 100 or older: 24 (7 men, 17 women).

Historical population

Year	Pop.	±%
1897	7,833	—
1910	8,961	+14.4%
1930	8,754	−2.3%
1950	8,935	+2.1%
1960	9,234	+3.3%
1970	9,726	+5.3%
1980	12,314	+26.6%
1991	25,014	+103.1%
1996	35,998	+43.9%

Year	Pop.	±%
2001	50,953	+41.5%
2004	75,530	+48.2%
2005	84,348	+11.7%
2011	90,097	+6.8%
2012	105,270	+16.8%
2014	88,447	−16.0%
2016	85,000	−3.9%
2019	83,337	−2.0%
2024	106,350	+27.6%

The most prominent nationalities in 2012 were:

Nationality	Percentage
Spanish	59.89
Russian	5.59
British	5.59
Ukrainian	3.19
Moroccan	3.13
Romanian	1.99
Bulgarian	1.88
Swedish	1.24
German	1.22
Other	16.28

== Politics ==
The city is a conservative stronghold, with the Partido Popular (PP) maintaining an absolute majority at the municipal elections of 2007, and 2011. PP however narrowly lost its absolute majority in 2015 to a coalition of five parties which designated Green candidate José Manuel Dolón García mayor.

== Transport ==
Torrevieja's main road link is the N-332 road linking Cartagena with Valencia hugging the Mediterranean coastline. There was once a branch line from the Alicante–Murcia railway serving Torrevieja; which closed in the late 1970s. There are plans to reopen this line.

== Places of interest ==
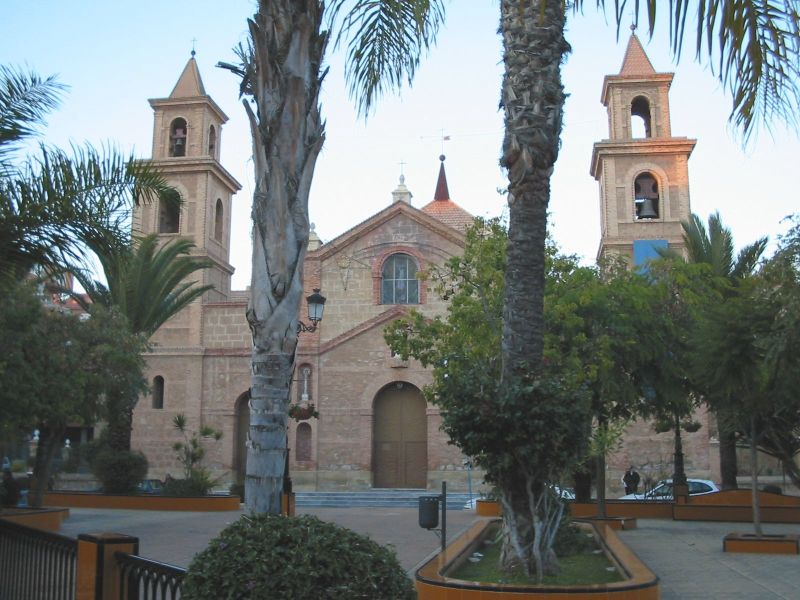
Iglesia Arciprestal de la Inmaculada Concepción

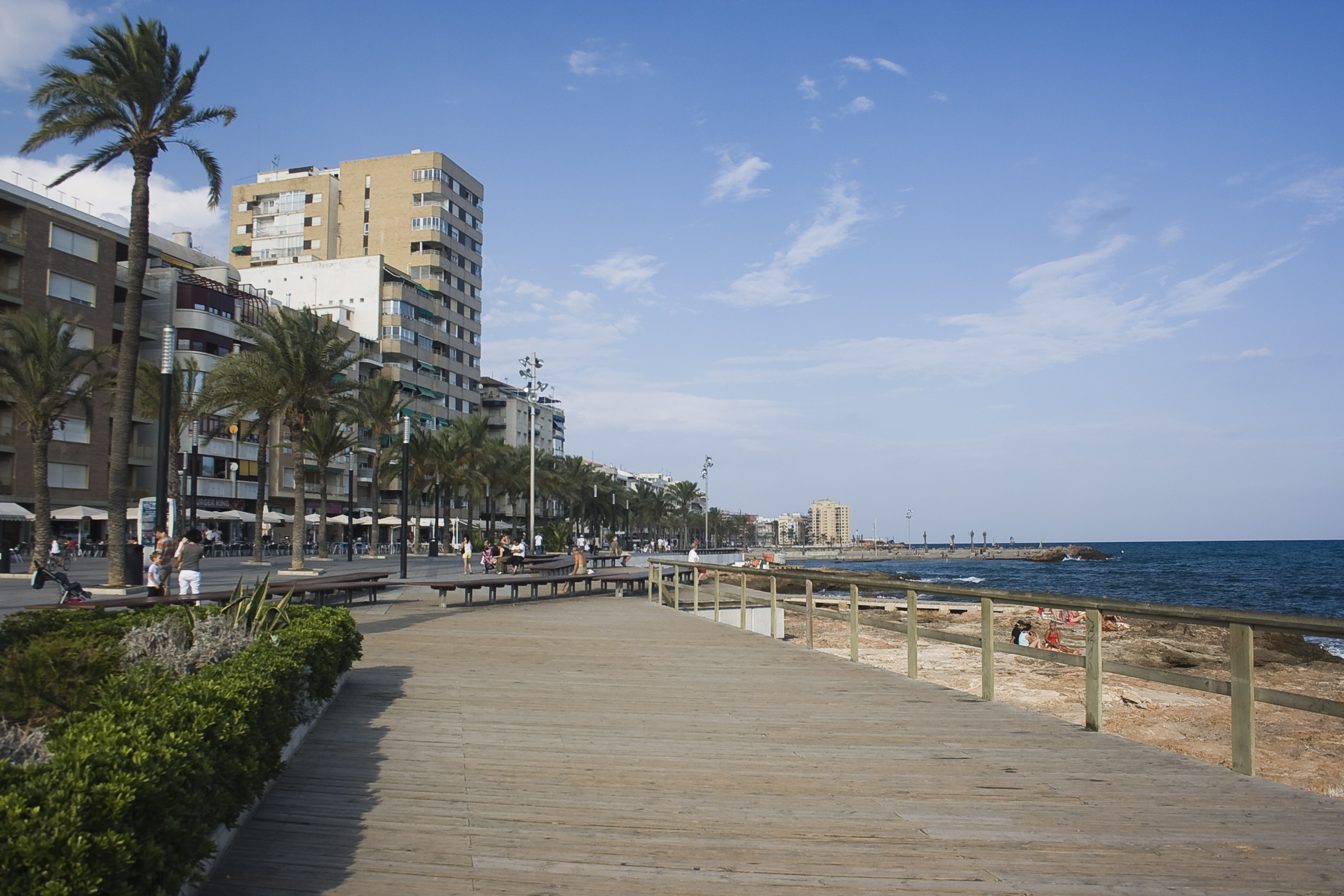
Torrevieja: Juan Aparicio seafront

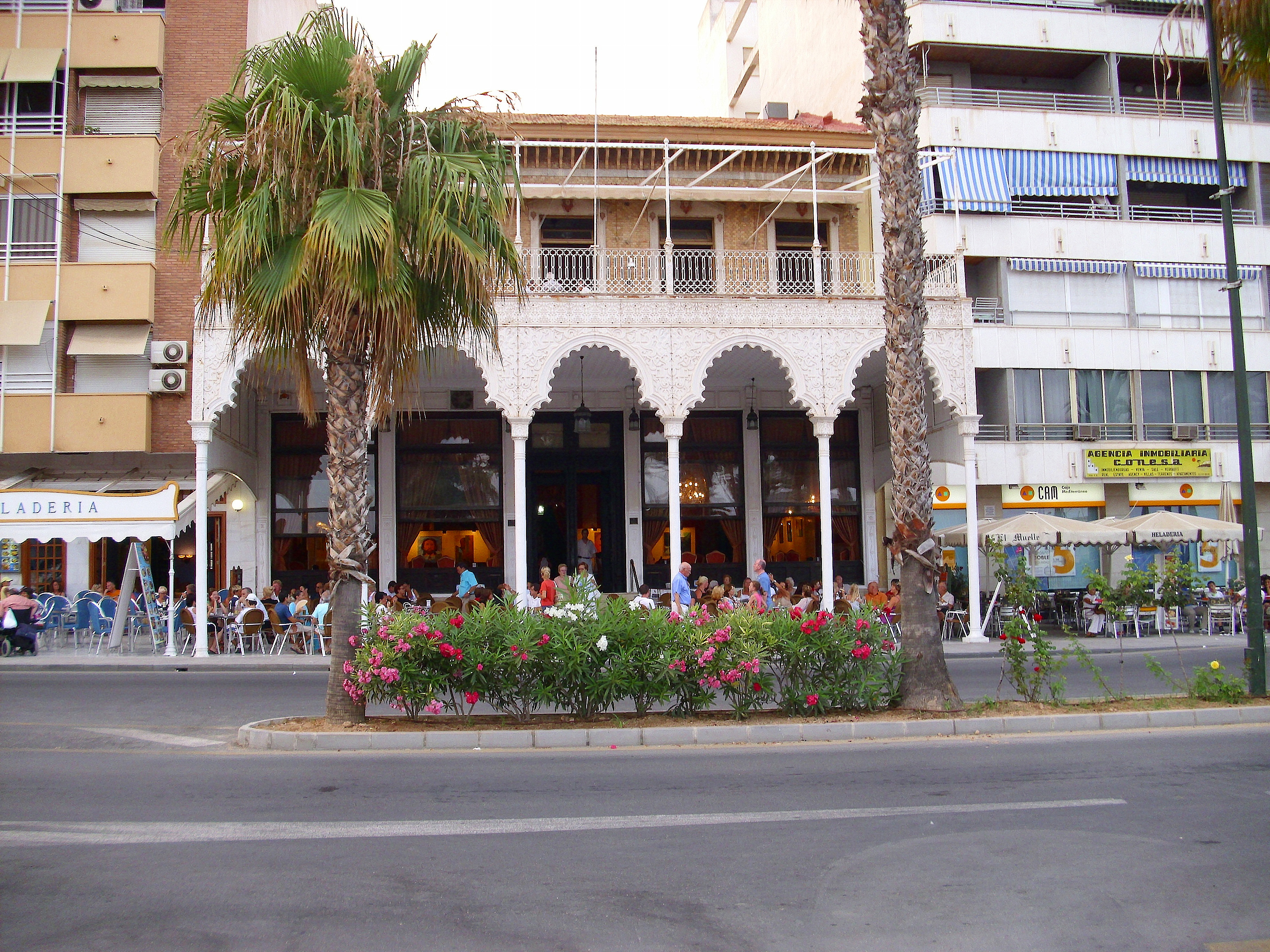
Building of the Casino

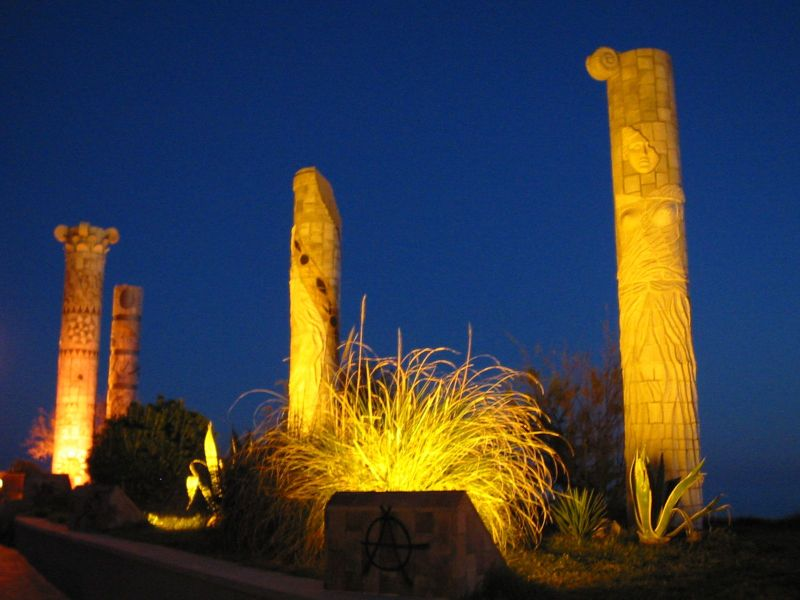
Monument to the Cultures of the Mediterranean

- Iglesia Arciprestal de la Inmaculada Concepción (Archpriest's Parish Church of the Immaculate Conception) – erected in 1789 and reconstructed in 1844, using stones reclaimed from the original Torre Vella (Old Tower)
- Panoramic viewpoint La Torre del Moro, old watchtower
- Iglesia de Nuestra Señora del Rosario (La Mata), constructed in 1896
- Paseo de la Dique de Levante, dyke or breakwater of Levante, 1600 m long
- Parque de las Naciones (Park of the Nations), scale map of the European continent
- Museo del Mar y de la Sal (Museum of the Sea and Salt)
- Submarine S-61 Delfin Floating Museum
- Albatros III Patrol Boat Floating Museum
- Eras de la Sal – served as a storehouse and wharf for salt from 1777 until 1958
- Las Salinas de Torrevieja – the two salt lagoons to the west of the city, Nature Park of the Lagoons of La Mata and Torrevieja
- Friday street market – As of May 2017, the market has moved to a new location outside of the city centre, near Aquapolis
- Centro Comercial de Habaneras – a semi-outdoor shopping mall
- Carrefour Torrevieja hypermarket
- Paraje Natural Municipal – Parque del Molino de Agua – Local natural park – waterwheel park in La Mata
- Palacio de la Música (music hall)
- Centro Cultural Virgen del Carmen (Virgen del Carmen Cultural Centre)
- Teatro Auditorio Municipal de Torrevieja (Torrevieja Municipal Theatre)
- International Music Auditorium of Torrevieja
- Museo de la Habanera 'Ricardo Lafuente' (museum dedicated to Ricardo Lafuente, composer of Habanera songs)
- Museum of Easter (Holy Week Museum 'Tomás Valcárcel')
- Old Railway Station – houses Torrevieja Natural History Museum
- Cultural Society of Torrevieja Casino – Neo-Mudéjar style interior from the 1880s
- Water fountains
- Seaside esplanade 'Juan Aparicio' (Paseo Maritimo Juan Aparicio)
- Park of the Molino (Windmill Park)
- Playa de los Náufragos
- Playa de la Mata
- Playa del Cura
- Playa de los Locos
- Natural swimming pools at the Juan Aparicio promenade
- Aquapolis, water park

== Sport ==
The town was home to professional handball club CB Torrevieja since 1973 until its bankruptcy in 2012. They played at the Palacio de los Deportes de Torrevieja, where the 2012 Copa del Rey de Balonmano was hosted. The town also hosted the 2nd IHF Women's Handball Qualification Tournament for the 2024 Summer Olympics.

The local football teams used to be Torrevieja CF and CD Torrevieja.

In road cycling, the town was the starting point of the 2023 La Vuelta Femenina and the starting point of the 2019 Vuelta a España.

== Notable people ==
- Joaquín Chapaprieta (1871–1951), politician
- Fourmidables, an a cappella singing quartet (2008)
- Nicola Kuhn, tennis player
