= Diego Rangel (footballer, born 1978) =

Spanish footballer

Personal information
- Full name: Diego José Rangel Monge
- Date of birth: 23 June 1978 (age 48)
- Place of birth: Almendralejo, Spain
- Height: 1.82 m (5 ft 11 1/2 in)
- Position: Centre-back

Senior career*
Years	Team	Apps	(Gls)
1995–1997	Extremadura B	33	(4)
1997	CF Extremadura	1	(0)
1997–1999	Real Madrid B	22	(0)
1999–2001	Valladolid B	12	(0)
2000–2001	→ Don Benito (loan)	28	(0)
2001–2002	Logroñés	20	(0)
2003	Mérida	12	(1)
2003–2004	Palamós	32	(0)
2004–2005	Pájara Playas	35	(4)
2005–2006	Figueres	35	(2)
2006–2007	Huesca	28	(0)
2007–2009	Girona	54	(1)
2010	Atlético Ciudad	10	(0)
2010–2011	Extremadura UD	25	(0)
2011–2012	Llagostera	17	(2)
Total		364	(14)
- * Club domestic league appearances and goals

Diego José Rangel Monge (born 23 June 1978) is a Spanish retired professional footballer who played as a central defender.

== Football career ==
Born in Almendralejo, Province of Badajoz, Extremadura, Rangel began his career with hometown club CF Extremadura. He made his only first-team – and La Liga – appearance on 13 October 1996 by playing the entirety of a 3–0 loss at Real Sociedad in a season that ended in relegation.

Subsequently, Rangel played eleven consecutive seasons in Segunda División B for Real Madrid Castilla, Real Valladolid Promesas, CD Don Benito, CD Logroñés, Mérida UD, Palamós CF, UD Pájara Playas de Jandía, UE Figueres and Girona FC. With the last of those clubs, he won the third-tier title in 2007–08, playing in the 1–0 aggregate final win over AD Ceuta in the playoffs.

Having lost his place with the Catalans in the Segunda División, Rangel moved in February 2010 back to the division below with CF Atlético Ciudad. He moved in the summer to his birthplace's Extremadura UD, and then in July 2011 to UE Llagostera, concluding his career with 306 games and 10 goals in the third division.

== Honours ==
Girona

- Segunda División B: 2007–08
