= Palaeobotanical Garden in Mata =

Natural reserve in Rio Grande do Sul, Brazil

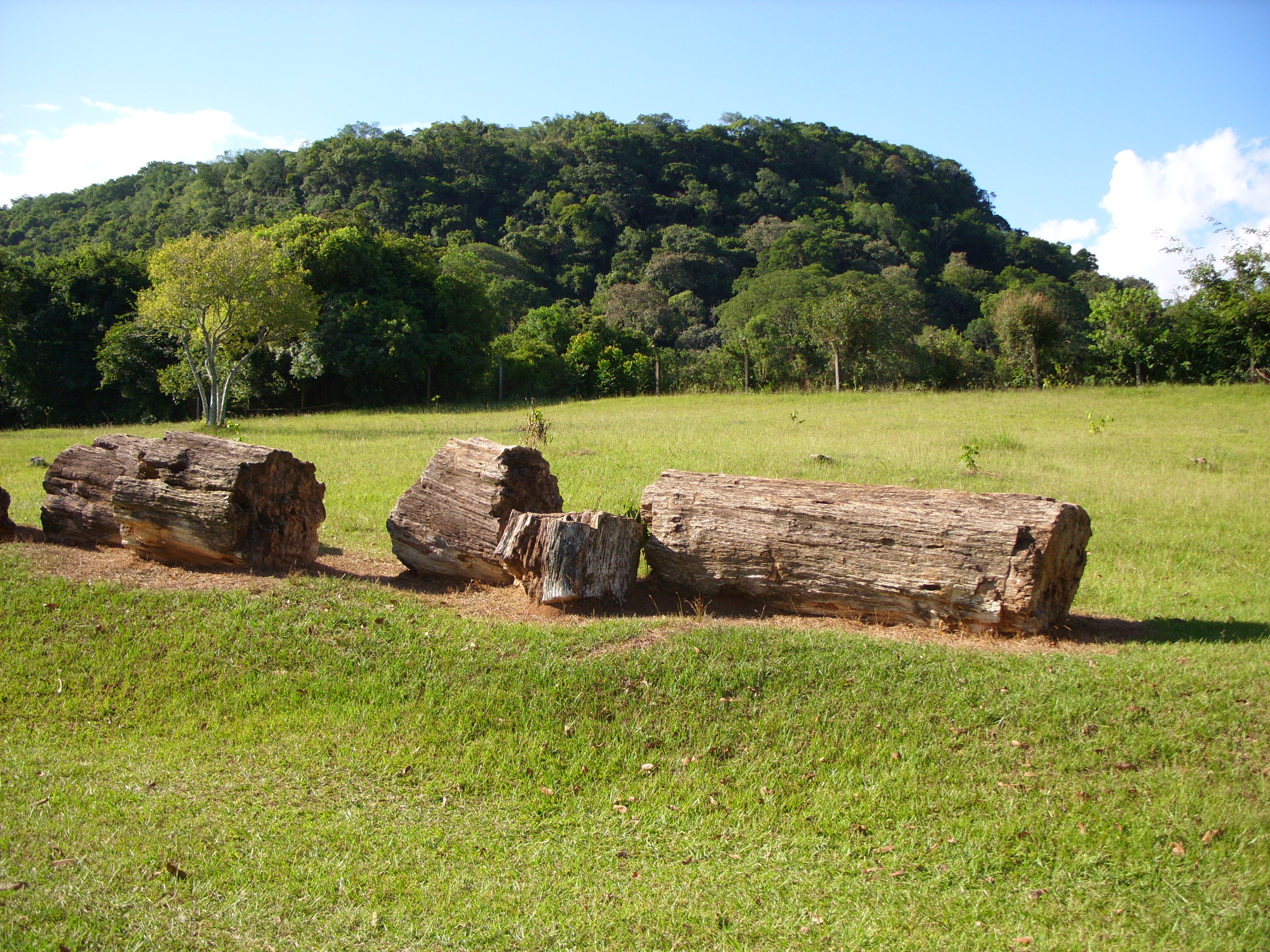
- Petrified wood in Palaeobotanical Garden
- Interactive map of Palaeobotanical Garden in Mata
- Location: Paleorrota Geopark, Rua do Sertão, 67
- Nearest city: Mata, Rio Grande do Sul, Brazil
- Coordinates: 29°33′29″S 54°27′42″W
- Area: 36.000 m^{2} (387.50 sq ft)

The Palaeobotanical Garden is a natural reservation in the town of Mata, in the state of Rio Grande do Sul, Brazil.

== Description ==
It is a fossil-natural reservation with an area of 36,000 m². Petrified wood in its original location. This in Caturrita Formation of Upper Triassic.

== Reference bibliography ==
- Os Fascinantes Caminhos da Paleontologia. Author: Antônio Isaia. Paleontologists tell the stories of Santa Maria and the region. 60 pages. Editora Pallotti (Portuguese).
- Cronologia Histórica de Santa Maria e do extinto município de São Martinho. 1787–1933. Vol. I. Author: Romeu Beltrão, Editora Pallotti, 1958 (Portuguese).
