= Mata, Rio Grande do Sul =

Municipality of Rio Grande do Sul, Brazil

Mata
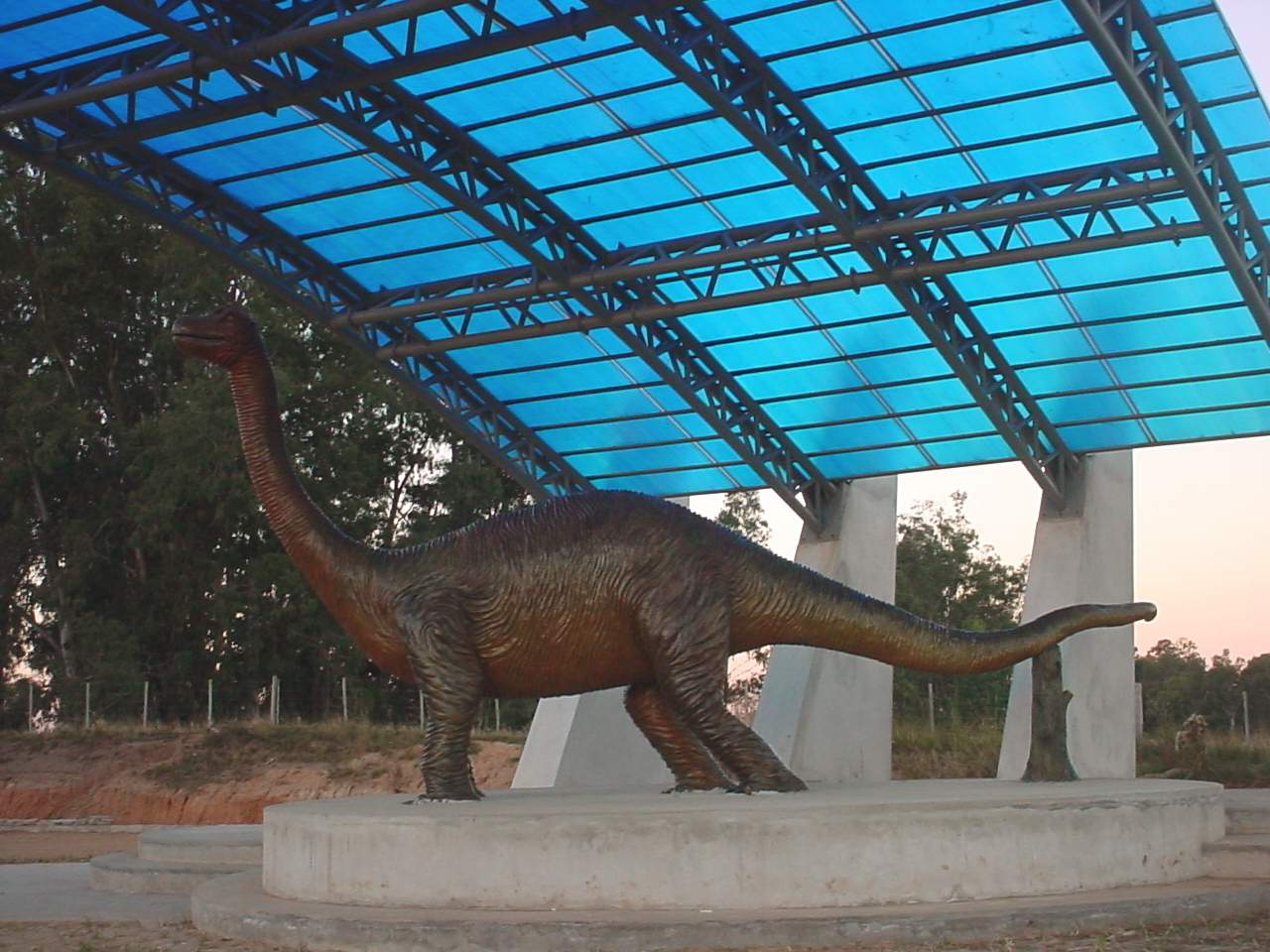

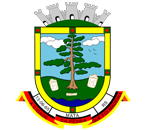
- Flag Coat of arms

- Location in Rio Grande do Sul, Brazil

- Location in Brazil
- Coordinates: 29°33′57″S 54°27′36″W
- Country: Brazil
- Region: South
- State: Rio Grande do Sul

Government
  - Mayor: Sergio Roni Bruning

Area
  - Total: 312.120 km^{2} (120.510 sq mi)
- Elevation: 127 m (417 ft)

Population (2022)
  - Total: 4,698
  - Density: 15.05/km^{2} (38.98/sq mi)
- Time zone: UTC−3 (BRT)

Mata is a municipality in Rio Grande do Sul in Brazil.

== Paleontology ==
The city of Mata has large deposits of petrified trees.

Museum of the city that have fossils:

1. Museum Daniel Cargnin.
2. Palaeobotanical Garden in Mata
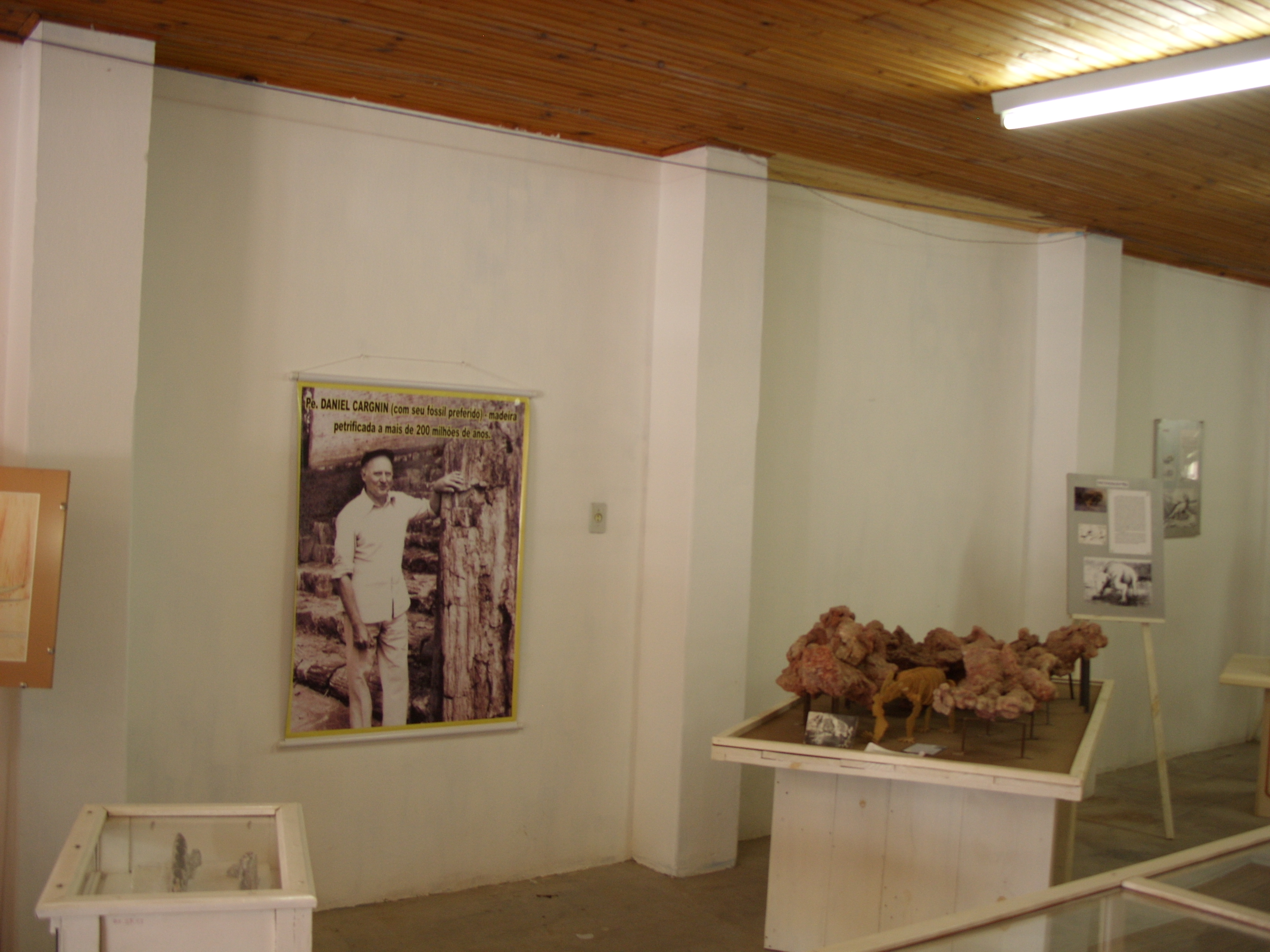
Museum Daniel Cargnin

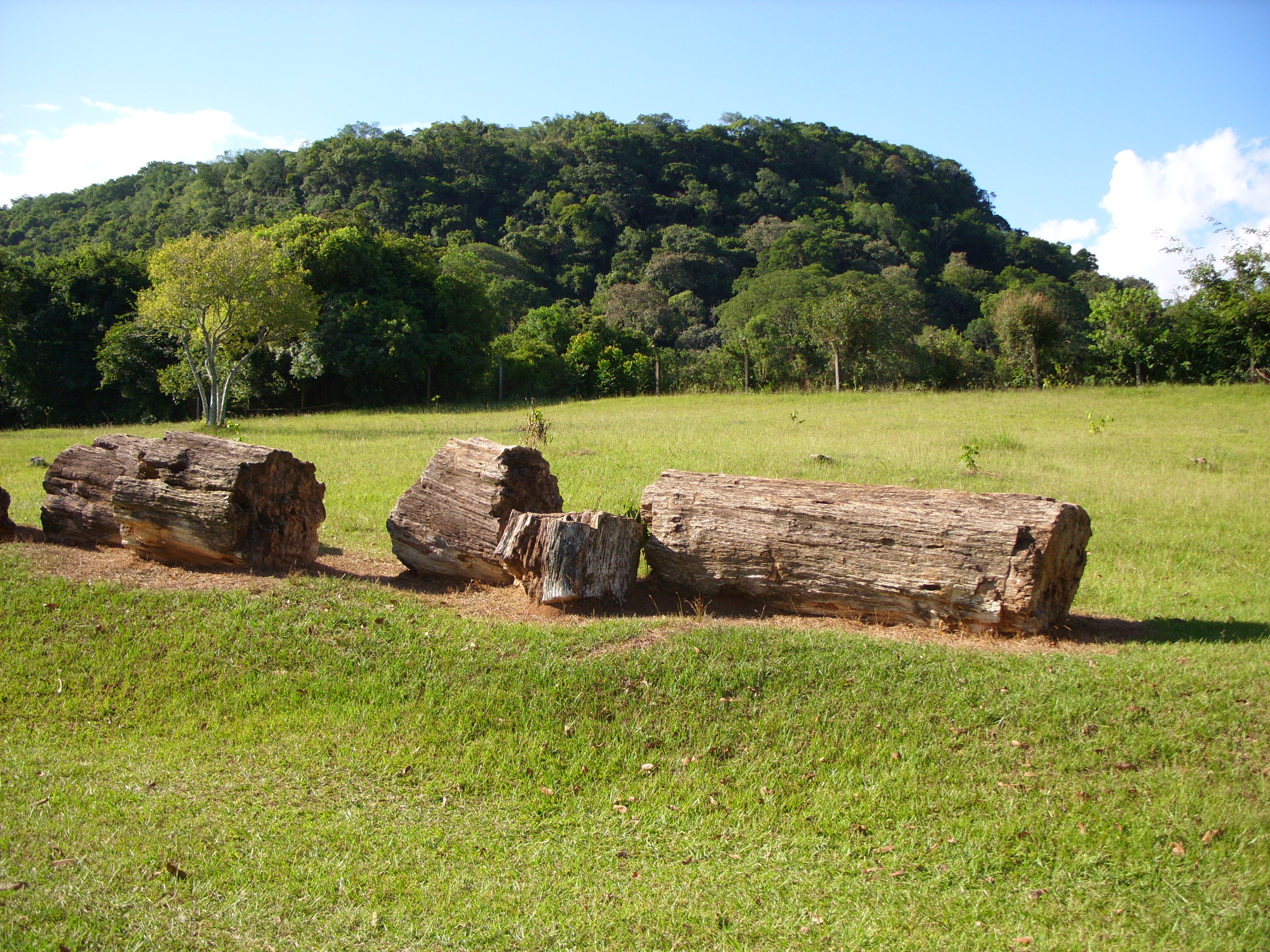
Petrified wood in the Paleobotanic Park

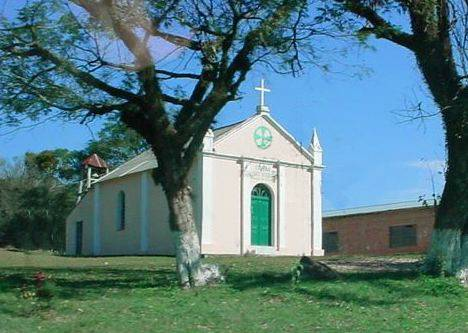
São Roque community

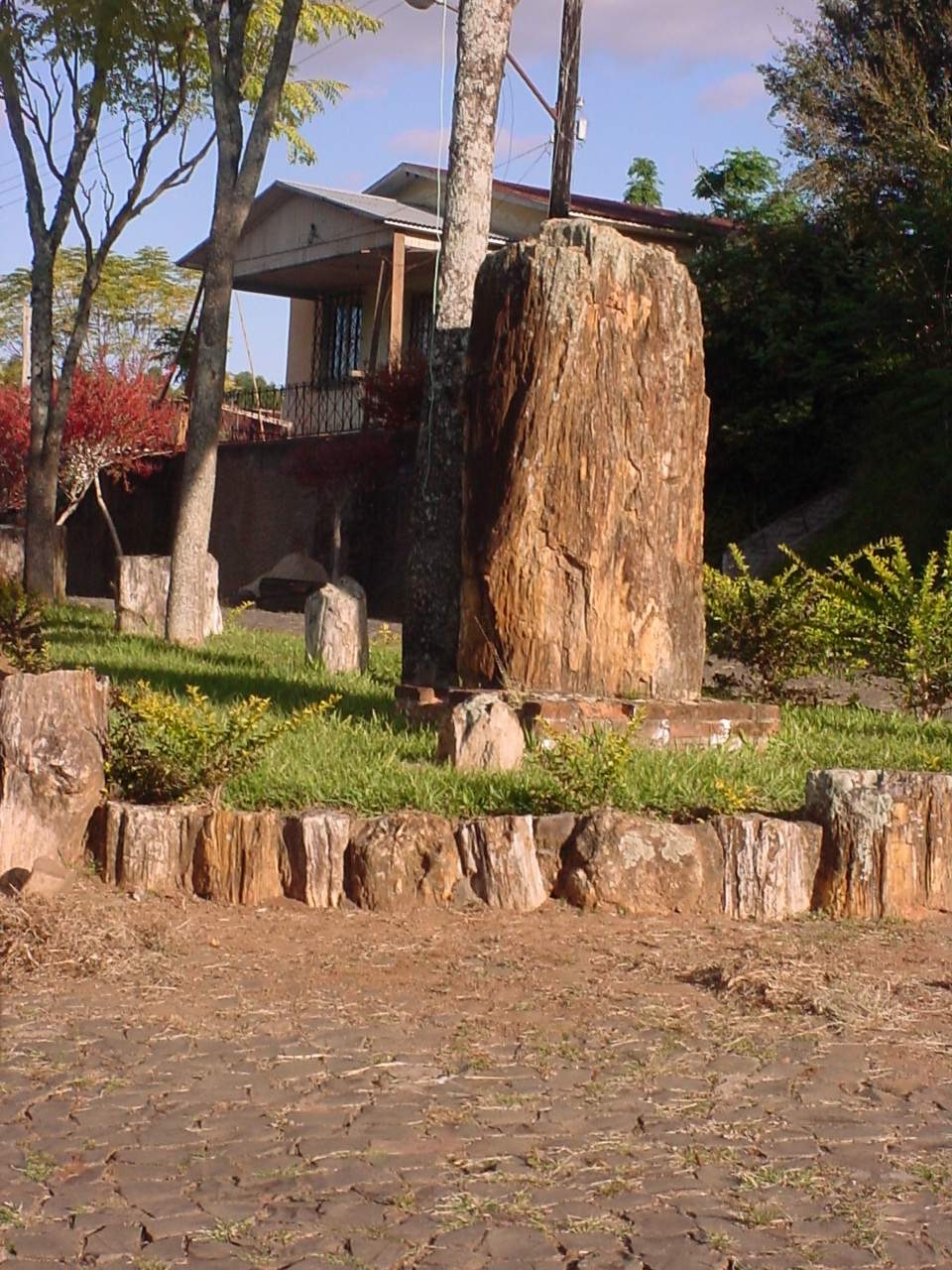
Petrified wood

== See also ==
- List of municipalities in Rio Grande do Sul
