= Manfred Razenböck =

Austrian footballer

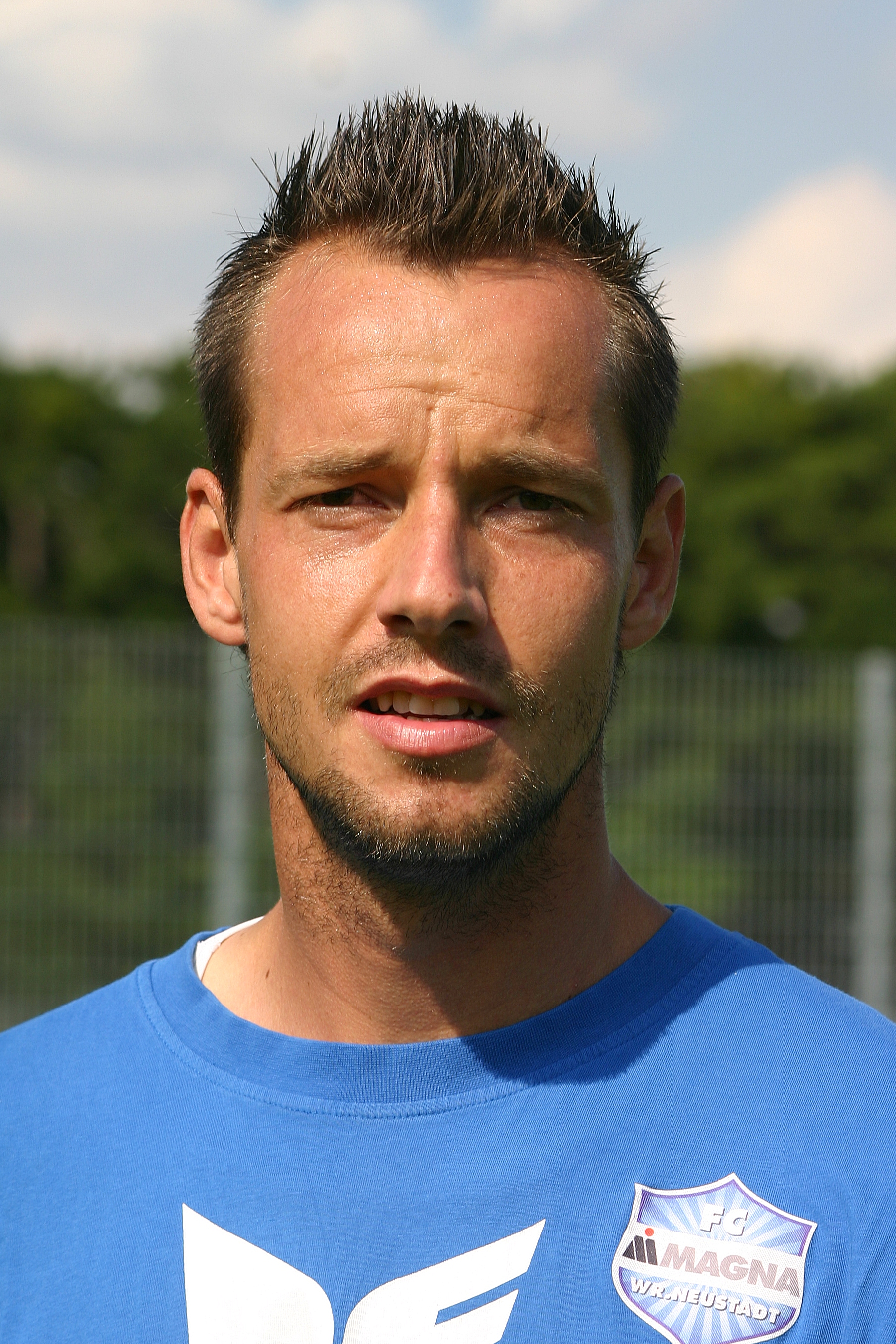

Personal information
- Full name: Manfred Razenböck
- Date of birth: 4 July 1978 (age 48)
- Place of birth: Austria
- Height: 1.90 m (6 ft 3 in)
- Position: Goalkeeper

Senior career*
Years	Team	Apps	(Gls)
2000–2002	SV Ried	10	(0)
2004–2005	FC Gratkorn	28	(0)
2006–2008	SC Schwanenstadt	50	(0)
2008–2012	SC Wiener Neustadt	7	(0)
Total		95	(0)
- * Club domestic league appearances and goals

Manfred Razenböck (born 4 July 1978) is an Austrian former footballer who played as a goalkeeper.

== See also ==
- Football in Austria
- List of football clubs in Austria
