= Oscar Ewolo =

Republic of the Congo footballer (born 1978)

Personal information
- Full name: Oscar Cristel Tony Ewolo
- Date of birth: 9 October 1978 (age 48)
- Place of birth: Brazzaville, People's Republic of the Congo
- Height: 1.71 m (5 ft 7 in)
- Position: Midfielder

Senior career*
Years	Team	Apps	(Gls)
1996–2005	Amiens	131	(1)
2005–2009	Lorient	114	(2)
2009–2012	Brest	97	(1)
2012–2013	Laval	32	(0)
Total		374	(4)

International career
2000–2013	Congo	38	(2)
- * Club domestic league appearances and goals

Oscar Cristel Tony Ewolo (born 9 October 1978) is a Congolese former professional footballer who played as a midfielder. He spent his career in France.

== Early life ==
Ewolo was born in Brazzaville, Congo-Brazzaville. He acquired the French nationality by naturalization on 23 October 1998.

== Career ==
He signed for Brest from FC Lorient on 15 July 2009. and in July 2012, joined Ligue 2 team Stade Lavallois on a one-year contract.

== Personal life ==
Ewolo is a former footballer and also a pastor. He is a Christian, and has spoken about his faith in the documentary "The Prize: Chasing the Dream" along with Kaká.

== Career statistics ==
Appearances and goals by national team and year
National team	Year	Apps	Goals
Congo	2000	6	0
Congo	2001	0	0
Congo	2002	2	0
Congo	2003	3	1
Congo	2004	4	0
Congo	2005	3	0
Congo	2006	2	0
Congo	2007	3	0
Congo	2008	5	0
Congo	2009	0	0
Congo	2010	0	0
Congo	2011	2	0
Congo	2012	3	1
Congo	2013	5	0
Total		38	2
