= Antonietta Cherillo =

Italian footballer (1955–1978)

Antoinetta Cherillo
Personal information
- Date of birth: 1955
- Date of death: 6 December 1978 (aged 22–23)
- Position: Forward

International career
Years	Team	Apps	(Gls)
1972–1977	Italy	3	(0)

Antonietta Cherillo (1955 – 6 December 1978) was an Italian professional footballer who played as a forward for Lazio and the Italy national team.
