= Gaspar Matas =

Spanish football pioneer and sports leader

- Born: Gaspar Matas Danés; 21 September 1878; Baix Empordà, Palamós, Spain
- Died: 6 August 1963 (aged 84); Baix Empordà, Palamós, Spain
- Citizenship: Spanish
- Occupations: sports leader; football pioneer
- Known for: Founder and president of Palamós CF

1st president of Palamós CF
- In office 1898–1910s

Gaspar Matas Danés (21 September 1878 – 6 August 1963) was a Spanish football pioneer in Catalonia who founded the very first official football club in 1898, Palamós CF, of which he was a player and president.

== Biography ==
Gaspar Matas was born in Palamós, a town and commercial port in the Costa Brava in Catalonia, as the son of a wealthy family from Palamos dedicated to the banking business, galena exploitation in the Osor mines, cork manufacturing, and maritime consignment. Being the son of a well-off family Matas was sent to Britain to complete his studies. During his stay in England, he developed a deep interest in football and when he returned to his hometown, he introduced this sport to the city with the creation of Palamós Foot-Ball Club in January 1898, a modest society that pioneered its goals and was presided over by himself, doing it so with the help of other friends with whom he shared parties on the beach of Cala Fosca. On the club's first Board of Directors, Matas was accompanied by Antonio Colomer and José Juan Eduardo Sáiz.

Initially made up of young people from the town and others from neighboring Palafrugell who had studied abroad with Matas, Palamós has the honor of being the first town in Girona and the first official club in Catalonia. Practiced first on the beach of Cala Fosca, then, once a football field was set up on the land where the Can Mario cork factory was later built, the first steps of Palamós FC were meetings between its own members and in front of the team, not a club, from Palafrugell, originally wearing a white shirt with dark blue pants. Although discrepancies are found in the club's first game, it is known that Palamós won the match 2–1 and that it took place in the open fields of the Armstrong factory in Palafrugell. Where the versions differ is in the rival. Some sources state that they faced the factory's own English workers, while others state that the opponents arrived by ship from the British Isles.

The growth of football at a regional level and, specifically, in the province of Girona, facilitated the organization of the first provincial championship in 1905 with the introduction of a cup and a new team from Girona of blue and white shirts, belonging to the maritime flag of Palamós. Palamós FC won the cup and then successively won the championships of 1906, 1907, 1908 and 1909.

The club changed its name several times in its beginnings: in 1926 it became Palamós Sport Club, and 15 years later, in 1941, it was renamed Palamós Club de Fútbol.

Matas died in Palamós on 6 August 1963, at the age of 84.

Since the end of the 1970s, a tournament with his name has been held in Palamós. and while he was there, he developed a deep interest in football.
