= Aleksei Brikov =

Russian footballer (born 1978)

Personal information
- Full name: Aleksei Viktorovich Brikov
- Date of birth: 13 June 1978 (age 48)
- Place of birth: Kovrov, Vladimir Oblast, Russian SFSR
- Height: 1.74 m (5 ft 9 in)
- Position: Midfielder

Senior career*
Years	Team	Apps	(Gls)
1995–1998	FC KAMAZ-Chally Naberezhnye Chelny	1	(0)
1995–1998	→ FC KAMAZ-d Naberezhnye Chelny	82	(5)
1999	FC Kovrovets Kovrov		
1999	FC Agrokomplekt Ryazan (amateur)		
2000	FC Ryazan-Agrokomplekt Ryazan	31	(3)
2001–2002	FC Spartak-Telekom Shuya	3	(0)
2002	FC Avtoagregat Kineshma		
2009–2010	FC Nikos imeni Kirova		
2012	FC Atlant Melekhovo		
2013	FC SKA Kovrov		
- * Club domestic league appearances and goals

Aleksei Viktorovich Brikov (Russian: Алексей Викторович Бриков; born 13 June 1978) is a Russian former footballer.

== Club career ==
He made his Russian Premier League debut for FC KAMAZ-Chally Naberezhnye Chelny on 25 October 1996 in a game against FC Torpedo-Luzhniki Moscow. That was his only season in the RPL.
