= Sébastien Michalowski =

French footballer (born 1978)

Personal information
- Full name: Sébastien Michalowski
- Date of birth: 12 March 1978 (age 48)
- Place of birth: Le Blanc-Mesnil, France
- Height: 1.81 m (5 ft 11 in)
- Position: Defender

Youth career
- 1995–1997: CM Aubervilliers
- 1997: Le Havre AC B

Senior career*
| Years | Team | Apps | (Gls) |
| 1997–1999 | CM Aubervilliers | | |
| 1999–2000 | Lille B | | |
| 2001–2002 | Lille OSC | 16 | (0) |
| 2002–2006 | Montpellier HSC | 107 | (0) |
| 2006–2008 | Sète Pointe Courte | | |
| 2008–2009 | FC Sète | | |
- * Club domestic league appearances and goals

Sébastien Michalowski (born 12 March 1978) is a retired French football defender. He was previously plays in CM Aubervilliers, Lille OSC, Montpellier HSC and FC Sète. He was born in Le Blanc-Mesnil.
