= La Mata, Panama =

La Mata
- Location within Panama
- Coordinates: 8°4′48″N 80°52′48″W
- Country: Panama
- Province: Veraguas

Population (2008)
  - Total: 1 069

La Mata is a town in the Veraguas province of Panama.
