= Hamlet Barrientos =

Bolivian footballer (born 1978)

Personal information
- Full name: Hamlet Israel Barrientos Ferrufino
- Date of birth: January 9, 1978 (age 48)
- Place of birth: La Paz, Bolivia
- Position: Goalkeeper

Senior career*
Years	Team	Apps	(Gls)
1999–2002	The Strongest		
2003–2004	Iberoamericana		
2005–2006	San José		
2006–2009	Real Potosí		
2010	Wilstermann		
2011–2013	Universitario de Sucre	19	(0)
- * Club domestic league appearances and goals as of July 16, 2009

Hamlet Israel Barrientos Ferrufino (born 9 January 1978 in La Paz) is a Bolivian retired footballer who played as a goalkeeper.

== Club career ==
He last played for Universitario de Sucre in the Bolivian First Division.

== International career ==
Barrientos was a non-playing squad member of the Bolivia national football team at the 2001 Copa América.
