= Jacek Kuranty =

Polish footballer

Personal information
- Full name: Jacek Kuranty
- Date of birth: 6 February 1978 (age 48)
- Place of birth: Tarnobrzeg, Poland
- Height: 1.73 m (5 ft 8 in)
- Position: Midfielder

Senior career*
Years	Team	Apps	(Gls)
1995–2002	Siarka Tarnobrzeg		
2002–2007	GKS Bełchatów	123	(8)
2007–2010	Odra Wodzisław Śląski	59	(0)
2010	Polonia Bytom	8	(0)
2010	Odra Wodzisław Śląski	4	(0)
2010–2013	Siarka Tarnobrzeg	71	(5)
2013–2015	Koprzywianka Koprzywnica		
2015–2016	Pogoń 1945 Staszów		
2016–2019	Klimontowianka Klimontów		
2022–2023	Sparta Dwikozy	3	(0)

Managerial career
- 2013–2015: Koprzywianka Koprzywnica (player-manager)
- 2015–2016: Pogoń 1945 Staszów (player-manager)
- 2017–2019: Klimontowianka Klimontów (player-manager)
- 2019–2021: Pogoń 1945 Staszów
- 2022–2024: Sparta Dwikozy
- * Club domestic league appearances and goals

Jacek Kuranty (born 6 February 1978) is a Polish football manager and former professional player who was most recently in charge of Sparta Dwikozy.

== Career ==
Kuranty previously played for Siarka Tarnobrzeg, GKS Bełchatów, Odra Wodzisław Śląski, and Polonia Bytom.

== Notes ==
- Jacek Kuranty at 90minut.pl (in Polish)
