= Josep Arrau i Barba =

Spanish painter

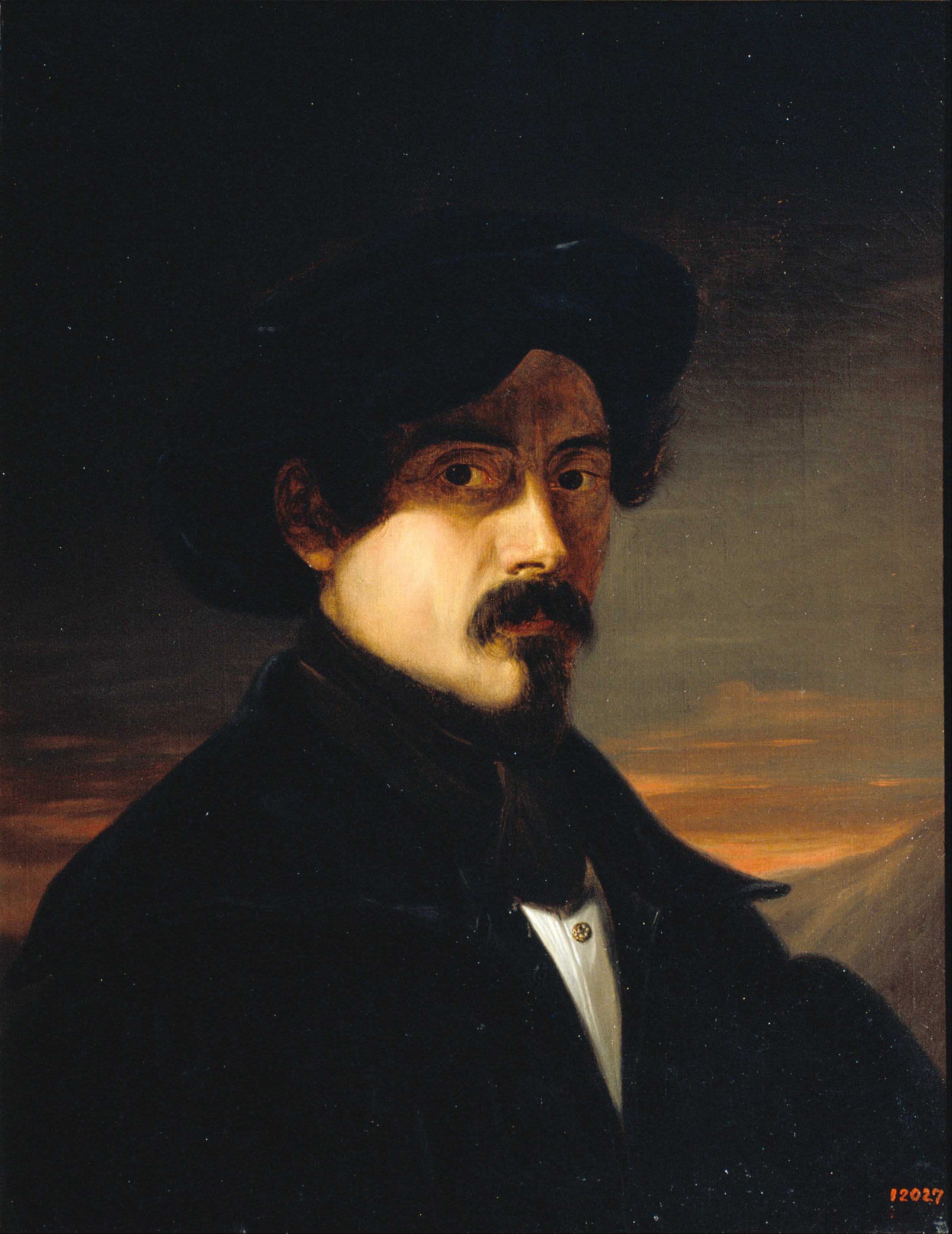
- Josep Arrau i Barba, Self-portrait, 1837
- Born: 4 May 1802; Barcelona, Catalunya, Spain
- Died: 2 January 1872 (aged 69); Barcelona, Catalunya, Spain
- Education: Josep Arrau (father); Llotja School, Barcelona; Giuseppe Molteni, Milan
- Known for: Painter, art restorer, author and educator
- Movement: Romanticism
- Spouse: Teresa Roger (m. 1854)

Josep Arrau i Barba (4 May 1802 - 2 January 1872) was a Catalan painter, noted for his portraits. Described as an "intellectual artist," he was also a pioneer of a contemporary, multi-disciplinary approach to art conservation, and published a number of works on the subject as well as conducting workshops on restoration and conservation work.

== Biography ==
He was born in Barcelona. His father, Josep Arrau i Estrada, was a noted painter and poet of the Campeny generation; his grandfather and great-grandfather were sculptors. The French invasion of 1808 forced his parents to leave Barcelona and seek refuge in Reus, where he first displayed talent for drawing. They returned home in 1814 and, the following year, he began studying Latin at the Colegio Tridentino. Soon after, he received his first art lessons from his father, but they were ended after a short time by his father's premature death.

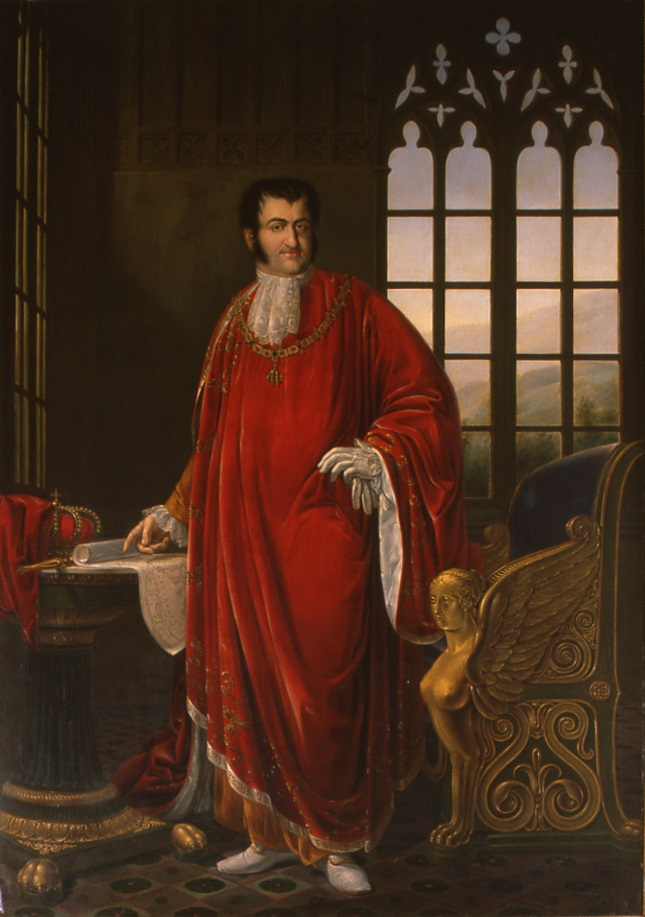
Portrait of Fernando VII (1833)

He then continued his studies at the Escola de la Llotja and in the workshop of Joan Carles Anglès, where he studied architecture and geometry as well as the mechanics of painting. He was at la Llotja From 1819 to 1826, where he received several prizes at their exhibitions. During this time he occasionally took lessons from the sculptor, Damià Campeny. Eager to learn all he could about everything that related to his art, he took a courses in anatomy at the College of Medicine; studied chemistry to understand the composition of paints and the processes of restoration and also took course in botany. In 1829, the culmination of all this work was a professorship of drawing at the College of the Piarist Schools of Barcelona.

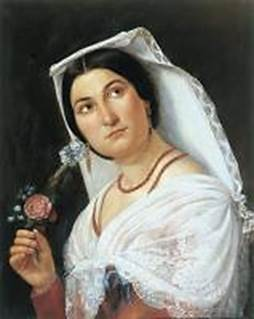
La Albanesa (1845)

In 1831, he visited Milan, where he took lessons from Giuseppe Molteni. He began by copying Molteni's works, but was soon painting from nature and assisting with the restoration of several canvases. The following year he returned home, by way of France, and established his own studio in Barcelona, where he specialized in portraits. In 1835, he made a second trip to Italy with his good friend, the physicist, Joan Agell i Torrents. While there, Agell studied electricity and Arrau produced a painting of the Convent of Santa Caterina and a portrait of his friend.

His first commercial success came in 1833 with a portrait of King Fernando VII, dressed in the uniform of the Order of the Golden Fleece, which he researched in Madrid so he could render the details accurately.

After 1834, he made several presentations at the "Real Academia de Ciencias y Artes de Barcelona", once again reflecting his eclectic interests; covering the history of art, natural sciences, the new daguerreotyping processes and Chevreul's work on the chemistry of dyes. Many of these were published as pamphlets. A particular area of interest was the subject of art conservation and restoration. He deplored restoration work carried out by inexperienced restorers and called for new restoration procedures to repair the mistakes that had been made in the past. He wrote a number of essays and conducted workshops in which he outlined advances in scientific research that could be applied to the restoration of paintings. As such, he was a pioneer of a multi-disciplinary approach to restoration and conservation.

He became President of Real Academia de Ciencias y Artes de Barcelona in 1866. As an educator, he had a very clear vision of all the disciplines that an aspiring artist needed to acquire. He was equally exacting in his vision for the training of art conservation methods. He has been described as one "great intellectuals of his time."

He married Teresa Roger in 1854 at the age of fifty-two and, in his later years, concentrated entirely on portraits. He died in Barcelona, aged 69. After his death, his widow donated three artworks to the National Art Museum of Catalonia, in accordance with her husband's wishes.

== Work ==
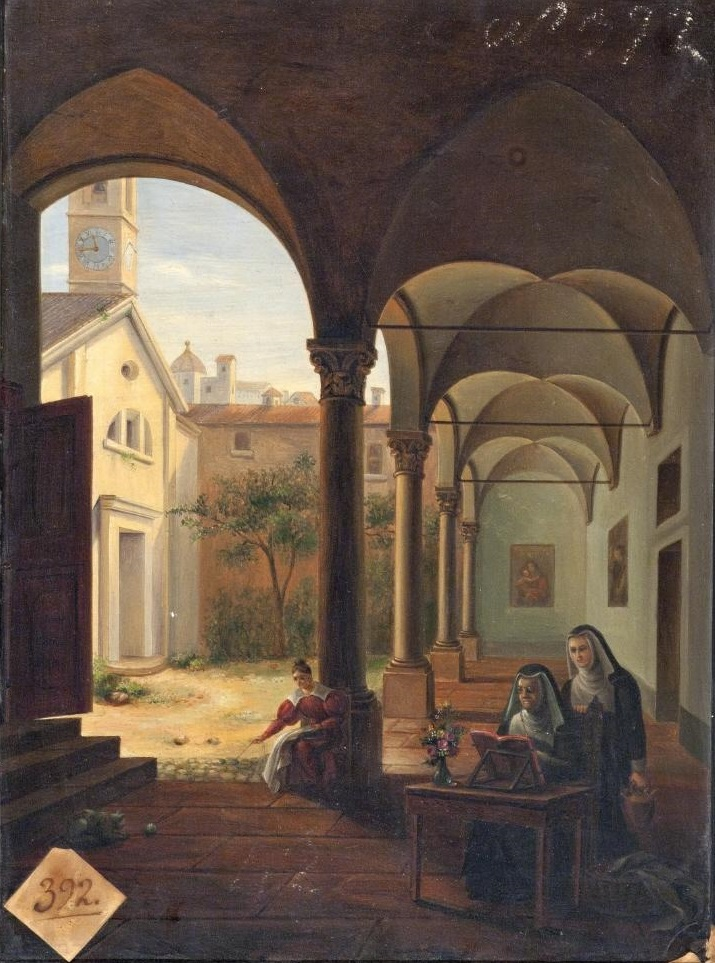
Cloister in a Convent

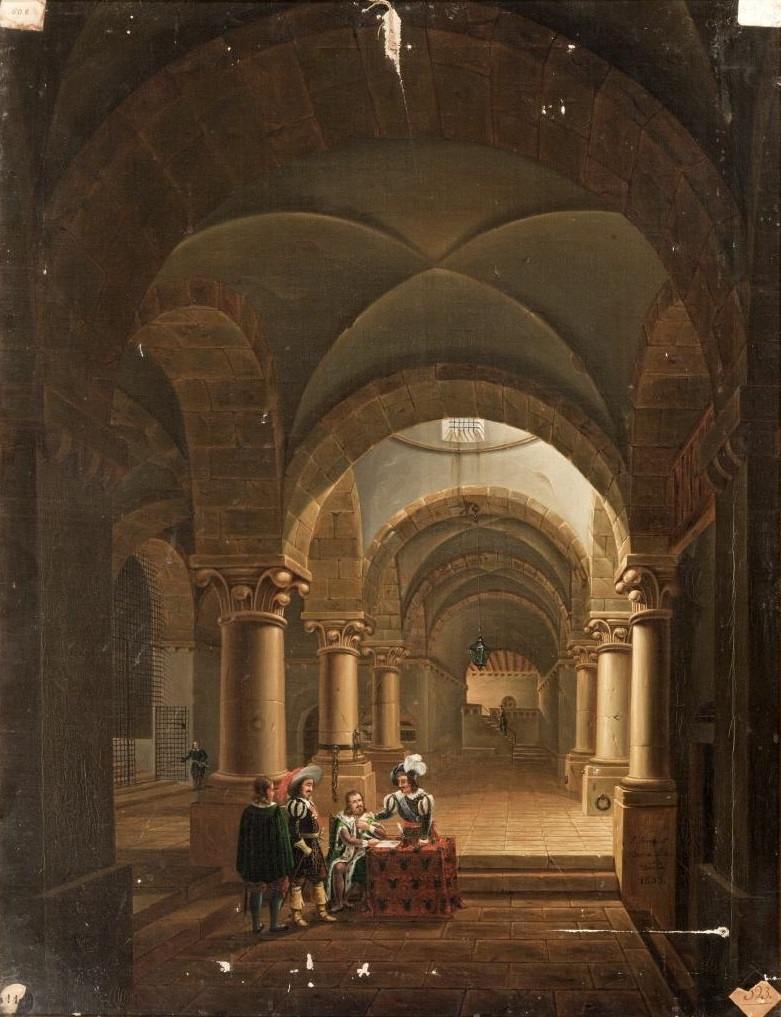
Scene in a Spanish Prison

Arrau was not only a prolific painter, but also a prolific writer. He published works on a diverse range of topics, and was one of the first artists to explore the possibilities of photography for artists. He also maintained personal journals in which he recorded his views on a variety of art subjects. These journals are now in the collection of the Archives of the City of Barcelona, where they have proved to be very useful to scholars investigating the early history of art conservation in 19th-century Spain.

Select list of paintings

- The Mob, [Depiction of the riots on the La Rambla, Barcelona in August, 1835], 1835
- Dama Catalana, [Catalan Woman], 1854
- Un Joven Africano, [Young African Boy], 1855 Exhibited at the Exposición Universal de Paris (1855)
- Una Alquimista, [The Alchemist], 1866 Exhibited at Academia de Bellas Artes de Barcelona (1866)
- Un Viejo, [Old Man], 1866 Exhibited at Academia de Bellas Artes de Barcelona (1866)
- Niñas Agell, [Agell daughters], 1872
- Retrato de un Niño Cazador, [Portrait of a Boy Hunter], date unknown
- Portrait of Damià Campeny, date unknown

Publications

- Acerca del Modo de Limpiar y Restaurar Pintura, [On Methods of Cleaning and Restoring Painting], 1834
- Acerca de los Sistems de las Escuelas Antigas de Pintura, [On the Methods of Painting in the Ancient Schools], 1835
- Paralelo entre los Estilos de Zurbarán y Murillo, [Comparison of the Styles of Zurbarán and Murillo], 1838
- La Fotografía Exerimentada por un Pintor con Mentalidad Científica, [Experimental Photography for the Painter with a Scientific Mind], 1839
- Observaciones Acerca del Daguerrotipo, [Observations about Daguerreotype], 1839
- Acerca de lo que falta descubrir para juntar la parte teóretica y cientifica de la pintura, [About what Remains to be Discovered to Combine the Theory and Science of Painting], 1850
- Acerca de las Escuelas de Dibujo par los Artesanos, [About the Drawing Schools for Artesans], 1850
- Teória Tónica y Cromatica Aplicada a la Pintura, [Theory of Tone and Colour Applied to Painting], 1854
- Necrológica de Don Damián Campeny, [Obituary of Don Damián Campeny], 1857
