= Éric Kossingou =

French footballer (born 1978)

Éric Kossingou (born 6 September 1978 in Paris) is a French former professional footballer who played as a defender. He made 43 appearances in Ligue 2 for ASOA Valence between 1999 and 2004.
