= Radim Novák =

Czech footballer (1978–2020)

Personal information
- Date of birth: 2 April 1978
- Place of birth: Děčín, Czechoslovakia
- Date of death: 12 May 2020 (aged 42)
- Height: 1.92 m (6 ft 4 in)
- Position: Goalkeeper

Youth career
- TJ Skorotice
- Jablonec

Senior career*
Years	Team	Apps	(Gls)
- Litvínov
2005–2015	Ústí nad Labem	236	(0)
2015	Bayern Hof	6	(0)
- * Club domestic league appearances and goals

Radim Novák (2 April 1978 – 12 May 2020) was a Czech football player and coach who played for Ústí nad Labem as a goalkeeper between 2005 and 2015.

== Playing career ==
Novák came up through the youth teams of TJ Skorotice and Jablonec. As an adult he played for Litvínov, Teplice, Varnsdorf, and Ústí nad Labem.

Novák trained with Slovak side Spartak Trnava in June 2009, but eventually stayed with Ústí. After Ústí nad Labem were promoted to the Czech First League in 2010, Novák started the 2010–11 season as the club's first-choice goalkeeper. He made 13 appearances for the club that season. In the first match of the 2011–12 season, following Ústí's relegation to the National Football League, he conceded an Olimpico from Lumír Sedláček in a 3–1 loss away to Opava. Novák played the majority of games in the 2011–12 Czech 2. Liga, which culminated in Ústí winning the league.

Novák left Ústí at the age of 37 after the 2014–15 season, during which time he lost his place as first-choice goalkeeper to Zdeněk Zacharda. As well as his 13 appearances in the First League, he made a further 223 appearances for the club in the second-tier Czech National Football League.

After finishing his professional career, Novák played in Germany for Bayern Hof under head coach Miloslav Janovsky. He appeared in six matches for Bayern Hof, conceding just two goals during his time at the club.

== Later years ==
Following his playing career, Novák was a youth team coach for FK Teplice. He died on 12 May 2020 after suffering from pancreatic cancer. Following his death, fans, former teammates and members of Novák's family gathered at the Městský stadion to say goodbye at the end of the same month.

== Honours ==
- Czech National Football League: 2011–12
