= Ghislain Bagnon =

French footballer (born 1978)

Personal information
- Full name: Ghislain Bagnon
- Date of birth: 24 December 1978 (age 47)
- Place of birth: Kokouezo, Gagnoa, Ivory Coast
- Height: 1.73 m (5 ft 8 in)
- Position: Right back

Youth career
- INF Clairefontaine
- Cannes

Senior career*
| Years | Team | Apps | (Gls) |
| 1998–2002 | Cannes | 69 | (0) |
| 2003 | Tournai | | |
| 2003 | Viry | | |
| 2004 | Marmande | | |
| 2004–2005 | Louhans-Cuiseaux | | |
| 2006 | AS Cozes | | |

International career
| 1997 | France U18 | | |
- * Club domestic league appearances and goals

Ghislain Bagnon (born 24 December 1978) is a French former professional footballer.

== Career ==
Born in Kokouezo, Gagnoa, Bagnon began playing club football in France with AS Cannes. He made his professional debut in Ligue 2 during 1998. He made 60 Ligue 2 appearances with Cannes before the club was relegated, and he played in the Championnat National for one further season. After he left Cannes, Bagnon had brief spells playing amateur football in England and in the Belgian Third Division with R.F.C. Tournai, before returning to play for ES Viry-Châtillon in 2003. He would finish his career playing amateur football in France with Marmande, CS Louhans-Cuiseaux and AS Cozes.

Bagnon won the 1997 UEFA European Under-18 Championship with France.
