= Mata (surname) =

Mata, sometimes Matta, is a Portuguese and Spanish surname.

It may refer to:

- Abelardo Mata (born 1946), Nicaraguan Roman Catholic bishop
- Benjamin Mata (born 1998), Cook Islands footballer
- Bryan Mata (born 1999), Venezuelan baseball player
- Clinton Mata (born 1992), Angolan footballer
- Eduardo Mata (1942–1995), Mexican conductor and composer
- Ernesto Mata (1915–2012), Filipino military figure
- Francisco Mata (1932–2011), Venezuelan singer and composer
- Juan Mata (born 1988), Spanish footballer
- Lorenzo Mata (born 1986) Mexican-American basketball player
- Marcelino da Mata (1940–2021), Guinean-Português Army officer
- Marcos Mata (born 1986), Argentine basketball player
- Mario Suárez Mata (born 1987), Spanish footballer
- Marta Mata (1926–2006), Spanish pedagogue and politician
- Max Mata (born 2000), New Zealand footballer
- Néstor Mata (1926–2018), Filipino journalist
- Olga Mata, Venezuelan woman detained for publishing a humorous TikTok video
- Vicente de la Mata (1918–1980), Argentine footballer
- Werner Mata (fl. 1969–1973), American soccer player
