= Erivelton (footballer, born 1978) =

Brazilian footballer

Personal information
- Full name: Erivelton Gomes Viana
- Date of birth: 2 April 1978 (age 48)
- Place of birth: Carvalhos, Minas Gerais, Brazil
- Height: 1.80 m (5 ft 11 in)
- Position: Centre-back

Senior career*
Years	Team	Apps	(Gls)
2007	Ceará		
2008	Mirassol		
2008	Sertãozinho		
2009–2012	Ceará	65	(3)
2010	→ Sertãozinho (loan)	17	(0)
2013	Horizonte	10	(0)
2013	Fortaleza		
2014	Itapipoca	5	(0)
- * Club domestic league appearances and goals

Erivelton Gomes Viana aka Erivelton (born 2 April 1978) is a Brazilian former professional footballer who played as a centre-back.
