= Roman Hupf =

Austrian footballer

Personal information
- Full name: Roman Hupf
- Date of birth: 4 November 1978 (age 47)
- Place of birth: Austria
- Height: 1.86 m (6 ft 1 in)
- Position: Defender

Team information
- Current team: TSV St. Johann im Pongau
- Number: 6

Youth career
- 1987–1994: Union Oberwang
- 1994–1998: SV Austria Salzburg

Senior career*
Years	Team	Apps	(Gls)
1998–2000	SV Austria Salzburg	2	(0)
2000–2003	ASVÖ FC Puch		
2003–2007	Union Mondsee		
2007–	TSV St. Johann im Pongau	212	(16)
- * Club domestic league appearances and goals as of 22 October 2015

Roman Hupf (born 4 November 1978) is an Austrian footballer who currently plays for the TSV St. Johann im Pongau.
