= Ankyofna Encada =

Bissau-Guinean footballer

Personal information
- Date of birth: 6 October 1978 (age 48)
- Height: 1.79 m (5 ft 10 in)
- Position: Midfielder

Senior career*
Years	Team	Apps	(Gls)
1996–1998	Horta		
1998–2002	Oliveira do Hospital		
2002–2004	Sporting Covilhã	44	(0)
2004–2006	União Micaelense	60	(3)
2006–2007	Pinhalnovense	24	(1)
2007–2008	Sporting Covilhã	22	(3)
2009–2010	Sporting Beira		
Total		150	(7)

International career
2003	Guinea-Bissau	2	(0)
- * Club domestic league appearances and goals

Ankyofna Encada (born 6 October 1978) is a Bissau-Guinean former footballer who played as a midfielder for Horta, Oliveira do Hospital, Sporting Covilhã, União Micaelense, Pinhalnovense and Sporting Beira, as well as the Guinea-Bissau national team.
