= Jiří Matas =

- Born: 6 August 1964 (age 62)
- Education: Czech Technical University in Prague
- Scientific career
- Fields: Computer science
- Workplaces: Czech Technical University in Prague; University of Surrey (PhD); University of Oulu; Tampere University
- Website: cmp.felk.cvut.cz/~matas/

Jiří Matas (Czech pronunciation: [ˈjɪr̝iː ˈmatas]; born 6 August 1964) is a Czech scientist specialising in pattern recognition. His areas of research include visual tracking, object recognition, image matching and retrieval, sequential pattern recognition, and RANSAC-type optimization methods.

== Biography ==
Jiří Matas received received an MSc degree in cybernetics (with honours) from the Czech Technical University in Prague in 1987 and a PhD degree from the University of Surrey in 1995 with Josef Kittler serving as his thesis advisor. He became associate professor at Czech Technical University in 2005 and full professor in 2010. In 2016 he was named Finland distinguished professor (FiDiPro) at Oulu and Tampere Universities.

Matas is an editor-in-chief of the International Journal of Computer Vision and was an associate editor-in-chief of IEEE Transactions on Pattern Analysis and Machine Intelligence from 2009 to 2013.

Matas served as programme chair for the 2004 and 2016 European Conference on Computer Vision (ECCV) and the 2007 Conference on Computer Vision and Pattern Recognition (CVPR), as well as general chair for both ECCV and CVPR in 2022.

From 2011 to 2017 he was a member of the computer science panel of the European Research Council.

According to the website Research.com, Matas is currently the #1 CompSci scientist in the Czech Republic based on discipline h-index.

== Selected articles ==
- L. Neumann; J. Matas (2016). "Real-Time Lexicon-Free Scene Text Localization and Recognition". IEEE Transactions on Pattern Analysis and Machine Intelligence. 38 (9): 1872–1885. doi:10.1109/TPAMI.2015.2496234. PMID 26540676.
- Z. Kalal; K. Mikolajczyk; J. Matas (2012). "Tracking-Learning-Detection". IEEE Transactions on Pattern Analysis and Machine Intelligence. 34 (7): 1409–1422. doi:10.1109/TPAMI.2011.239. PMID 22156098.
- J. Matas; O. Chum; M. Urban; T. Pajdla (2004). "Robust wide-baseline stereo from maximally stable extremal regions". Image and Vision Computing. 22 (10): 761–767. doi:10.1016/j.imavis.2004.02.006.
- J. Kittler; M. Hatef; R. P.W. Duin; J. Matas (1998). "On combining classifiers". IEEE Transactions on Pattern Analysis and Machine Intelligence. 20 (3): 226–239. doi:10.1109/34.667881.
