= Talinda Nyathi =

Motswana footballer

Personal information
- Full name: Talinda Nyathi
- Date of birth: 4 August 1978 (age 48)
- Place of birth: Botswana
- Position: Defender

Senior career*
| Years | Team | Apps | (Gls) |
| 2003–2007 | Notwane FC | | |
| 2007– | ECCO City Green | | |

International career
| 2004 | Botswana | 2 | (0) |
- * Club domestic league appearances and goals

Talinda Nyathi (born 4 August 1978) is a Botswana former footballer. He played for the Botswana national football team in 2004.
