= Antti-Jussi Karnio =

Finnish footballer (born 1978)

Personal information
- Date of birth: 14 March 1978 (age 48)
- Place of birth: Finland
- Height: 1.85 m (6 ft 1 in)
- Position: Goalkeeper

Team information
- Current team: JJK
- Number: 31

Senior career*
Years	Team	Apps	(Gls)
2006	Inter Turku	1	(0)
2007–2008	FF Jaro	27	(0)
2009–	JJK	3	(0)
- * Club domestic league appearances and goals as of 12 October 2009

Antti-Jussi Karnio (born 14 March 1978) is a Finnish football player currently playing for JJK.

== See also ==
- Football in Finland
- List of football clubs in Finland
