= Héctor Bosque =

Spanish footballer

Personal information
- Full name: Héctor Bosque Boix
- Date of birth: 16 August 1978 (age 48)
- Place of birth: Alcañiz, Spain
- Height: 1.80 m (5 ft 11 in)
- Position: Midfielder

Youth career
- Alcañiz

Senior career*
Years	Team	Apps	(Gls)
1996–1997	Alcañiz		
1997–1998	Amorós		
1998–1999	Oviedo B	24	(2)
1999–2000	Alcañiz		
2000–2001	Binéfar	52	(9)
2001–2004	Conquense	109	(11)
2004–2007	Castellón	91	(5)
2007–2009	Alicante	25	(2)
2009–2010	Teruel	0	(0)
- * Club domestic league appearances and goals

Héctor Bosque Boix (born 16 August 1978 in Alcañiz, Teruel) is a Spanish retired footballer who played as a midfielder.

== Career ==
Héctor Bosque spent three seasons playing for CD Castellón, where he scored six goals in 94 league matches (most of them in the Segunda División). In July 2007, he signed for Alicante CF on a free transfer from Castellón.
