= Barney Marman =

Motswana footballer

Personal information
- Full name: Barney Marman
- Date of birth: 30 May 1973 (age 53)
- Place of birth: Botswana
- Position: Midfielder

Senior career*
Years	Team	Apps	(Gls)
1996–	Mogoditshane Fighters		

International career
1997–2003	Botswana	10	(0)
- * Club domestic league appearances and goals

Barney Marman (born 30 May 1978) is a Motswana former footballer who played as a midfielder. He played ten games for the Botswana national football team between 1997 and 2003.
