= Antonio Sambruno =

Spanish footballer

Personal information
- Full name: Antonio Sambruno Aragón
- Date of birth: 15 July 1978 (age 48)
- Place of birth: Cádiz, Spain
- Height: 1.84 m (6 ft 0 in)
- Position: Defender

Team information
- Current team: San Fernando

Youth career
- Cádiz

Senior career*
Years	Team	Apps	(Gls)
1995–1999	Cádiz B		
1998–2004	Cádiz	99	(3)
2004–2005	Castellón	2	(0)
2005–2006	Leganés	34	(1)
2006–2007	Cultural Leonesa	32	(1)
2007–2009	Portuense	57	(1)
2009–2010	Villajoyosa	33	(1)
2010–2014	San Fernando	94+	(6+)
2014–2015	Lincoln Red Imps	16	(0)
- * Club domestic league appearances and goals as of 3 August 2015

Antonio Sambruno Aragón (born 15 July 1978) is a Spanish former professional footballer who played as a centre-back.

== Club career ==
Born in Cádiz, Andalusia, Sambruno finished his graduation with hometown's Cádiz CF, making his senior debuts with the reserves in the 1995–96 season, only being promoted to first team three seasons later. In 2002–03, Sambruno appeared in 26 matches, scoring once, and achieved promotion to Segunda División. On 30 August 2003 he made his professional debut, starting in a 2–1 home win over Polideportivo Ejido.

In the following years Sambruno competed in Segunda División B but also in Tercera División, representing CD Castellón, CD Leganés, Cultural y Deportiva Leonesa, Racing Club Portuense, Villajoyosa CF and San Fernando CD.
