= Vedat Kapurtu =

Turkish footballer (born 1978)

Personal information
- Date of birth: 30 June 1978 (age 48)
- Place of birth: Bakırköy, Turkey
- Height: 1.79 m (5 ft 10 in)
- Position: Goalkeeper

Team information
- Current team: Karabükspor
- Number: 22

Senior career*
Years	Team	Apps	(Gls)
1997–2002	Bakırköyspor	62	(0)
2002–2004	Gaziosmanpaşaspor	48	(0)
2004–2006	Sivasspor	3	(0)
2006	→Mardinspor (loan)	13	(0)
2006–2008	Mardinspor	16	(0)
2008–2009	Şanlıurfaspor	21	(0)
2009–2010	Kocaeli Birlik Spor	33	(0)
2010–2012	Göztepe	29	(0)
2012–2017	Yeni Malatyaspor	80	(0)
2017–	Tokatspor	11	(0)
- * Club domestic league appearances and goals as of 4 June 2018 ‡ National team caps and goals as of 4 June 2018

Vedat Kapurtu (born 30 June 1978) is a Turkish footballer who plays as a goalkeeper for Tokatspor.

== Professional career ==
A youth product of his local side Bakırköyspor, Kapurtu made his professional debut with Sivasspor in a 2-0 Süper Lig loss to Galatasaray on 11 September 2005. Kapurtu spent the later part of his career with Göztepe and Yeni Malatyaspor in the TFF First League.
