= Vladimir Buss =

Russian footballer

Personal information
- Full name: Vladimir Viktorovich Buss
- Date of birth: 17 June 1978 (age 48)
- Height: 1.80 m (5 ft 11 in)
- Position: Forward

Youth career
- SDYuSShOR-4 Tolyatti

Senior career*
Years	Team	Apps	(Gls)
1995	FC Lada-d Togliatti	22	(3)
1996–1997	FC Lada Togliatti	24	(1)
- * Club domestic league appearances and goals

Vladimir Viktorovich Buss (Russian: Владимир Викторович Бусс; born 17 June 1978) is a former Russian football player.

Buss played in the Russian Premier League with FC Lada Togliatti.
