= Stéphane Lucas =

French footballer (born 1978)

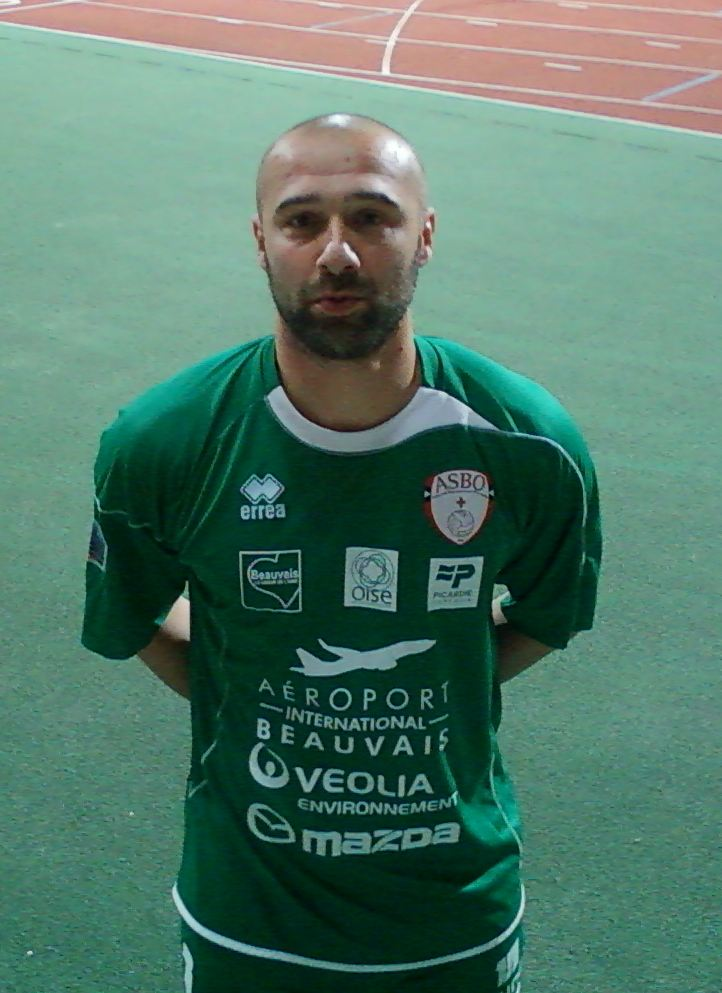
- Lucas with AS Beauvais in 2012

Personal information
- Date of birth: 18 April 1978 (age 48)
- Place of birth: Aubervilliers, France
- Height: 1.82 m (6 ft 0 in)
- Position: Goalkeeper

Senior career*
Years	Team	Apps	(Gls)
1997–1999	Red Star	34	(0)
1999–2001	Real Oviedo B		
2002	Olympique Noisy-le-Sec		
2002–2004	AS Angoulême		
2004–2005	AS Poissy		
2005–2010	Paris FC		
2010–2012	AS Beauvais		
2012	RCF Paris		
2013–2014	Chambly		
2014–2017	FCM Aubervilliers		
- * Club domestic league appearances and goals

Stéphane Lucas (born 18 April 1978) is a French former professional footballer who played as a goalkeeper.

Lucas played at the professional level in Ligue 2 for Red Star Saint-Ouen.
