= Emmanuel Gros =

French footballer (born 1978)

Personal information
- Date of birth: 28 July 1978 (age 48)
- Place of birth: Roussillon
- Position: Midfielder

Senior career*
Years	Team	Apps	(Gls)
1995–1998	Nîmes Olympique		
1998–2000	Dijon FCO		
2001–2003	Stade Beaucairois		
2003–2004	FC Martigues		
- * Club domestic league appearances and goals

Emmanuel Gros (born 28 July 1978) is a retired French football midfielder.
