= Hakim Bouchouari =

Belgian footballer

Personal information
- Date of birth: 25 September 1978 (age 48)
- Place of birth: Brussels, Belgium
- Height: 1.80 m (5 ft 11 in)
- Position: Forward

Senior career*
Years	Team	Apps	(Gls)
1987–1990	FC Kontich		
1990–1995	K. Boom F.C.		
1995–1997	FC Duffel		
1997–1999	F.C. Zwarte Leeuw		
1999–2000	Geel		
2000–2001	K.R.C. Mechelen		
2001–2002	Hoboken		
2002–2003	Wezemaal		
2003–2004	K.V.K. Tienen		
2004–2005	Nieuwkerken-Sint-Niklaas		
2005–2006	K.S.C. Lokeren		
2006–2007	Standard Liège	5	(0)
2007	Molenbeek Brussels Strombeek	10	(3)
2008	Antwerp		
- * Club domestic league appearances and goals

Hakim Bouchouari (born 25 September 1978) is a Belgian former professional footballer who played as a forward.
