= La Mata, Toledo =

Municipality of Spain

Coordinates: 39.943611°N 4.438056°W

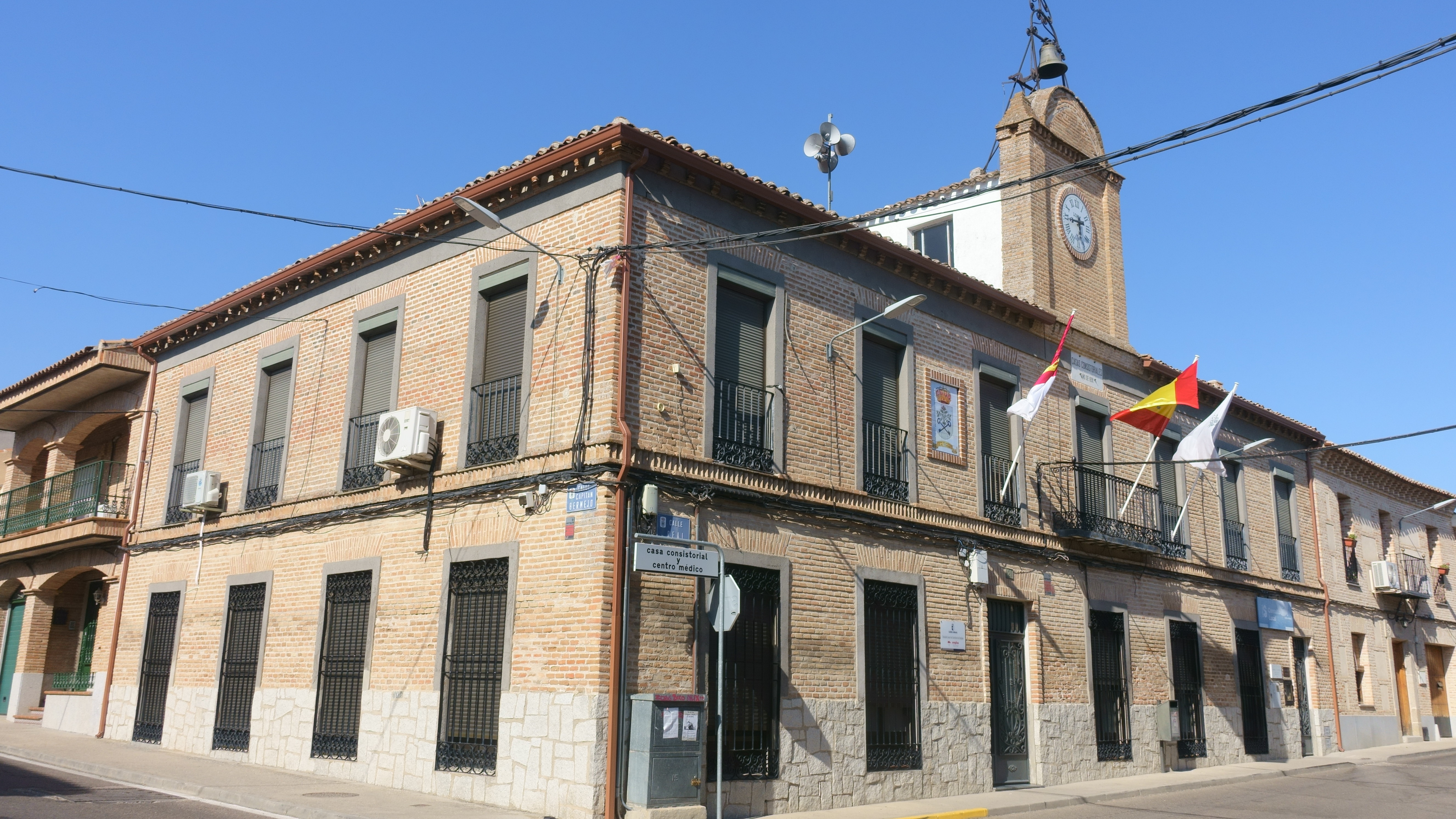
La Mata Town Hall

Flag of La Mata, Toledo

Coat of arms of La Mata, Toledo

La Mata is a village in the province of Toledo and autonomous community of Castile-La Mancha, Spain.

== Demographics ==
Historical population
Year	Pop.	±%
1900	1,295	—
1910	1,512	+16.8%
1920	1,738	+14.9%
1930	2,121	+22.0%
1940	1,930	−9.0%
1950	1,979	+2.5%
1960	1,736	−12.3%
1970	1,341	−22.8%
1981	1,071	−20.1%
1991	1,001	−6.5%
2001	967	−3.4%
2011	1,022	+5.7%
2021	823	−19.5%
2023	881	+7.0%
Source: INE
