= Palamós CF =

Association football club in Spain

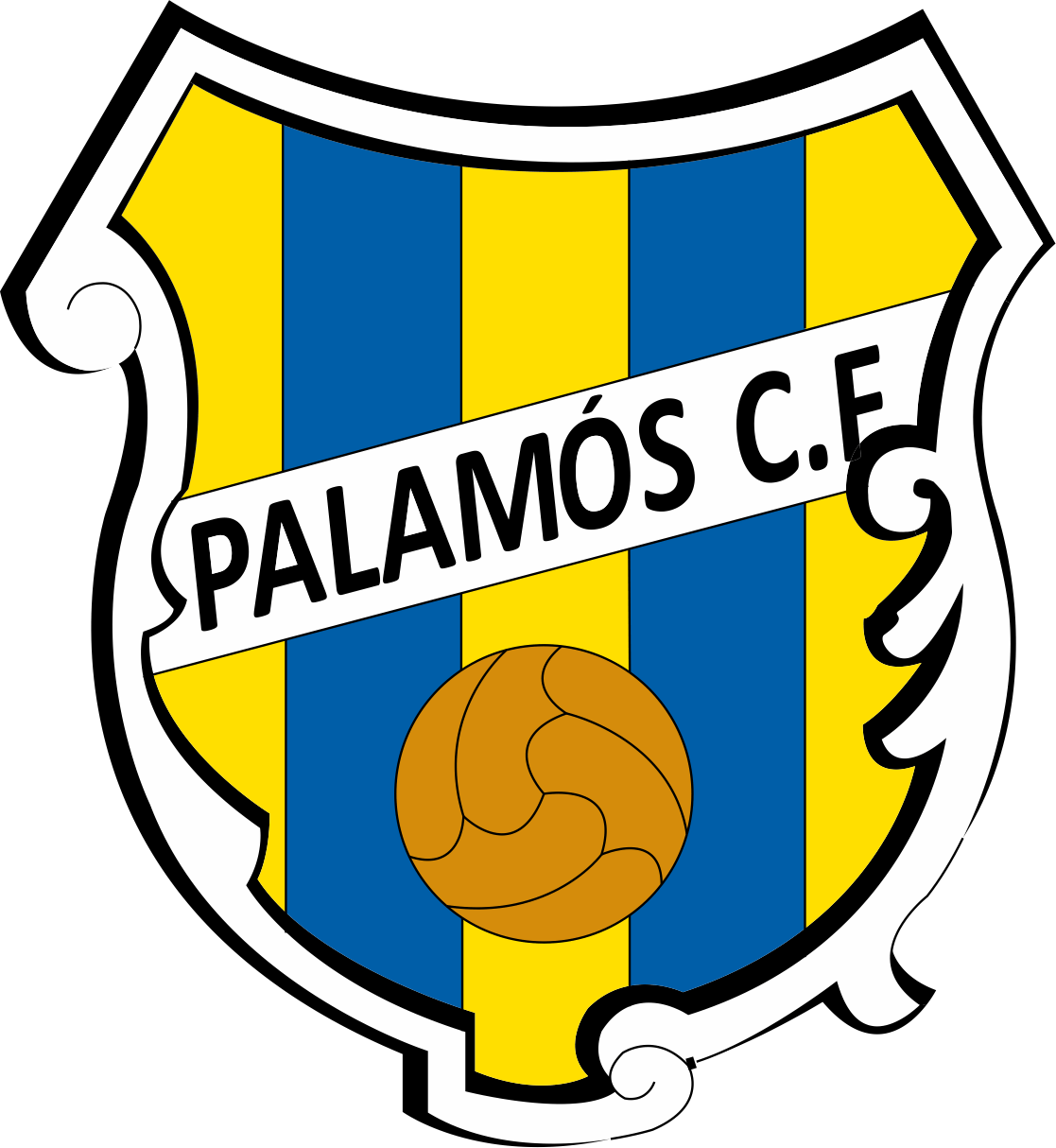
- Full name: Palamós Club de Futbol, S.A.D.
- Founded: 1898; 128 years ago
- Ground: Estadi Palamós Costa Brava, Palamós, Catalonia, Spain
- Capacity: 5,824
- President: Patxi Otamendi
- Head coach: Joan Mármol
- League: Primera Catalana – Group 1
- 2025–26: Primera Catalana – Group 1, 2nd of 16
- Website: palamoscf.cat
Home colours	Away colours

Palamós Club de Futbol, S.A.D. is a Spanish football team based in Palamós, a town and commercial port in the Costa Brava, in the autonomous community of Catalonia. Founded in the late 19th century, it currently plays in Primera Catalana – Group 1, holding home matches at Estadi Palamós Costa Brava, with a 5,824-seat capacity.

== History ==
The oldest club in Catalonia and the one of oldest in the country, Palamós was born in 1898, founded by Gaspar Matas i Danés who had studied in England, as Palamós Foot-Ball Club. The club changed its name several times in its beginnings: in 1926 it became Palamós Sport Club, being renamed Palamós Club de Fútbol 15 years later.

By 1954, it changed names again, now for Palamós Sociedad Cultural; it did not play any official competition for the following six years. In 1973, in the 75th anniversary of football in the city, the Royal Spanish Football Federation allowed the club to recapture the name Palamós CF.

In 1989–90, Palamós made its Segunda División débuts, and managed to go into the final rounds with a chance for top level promotion. In spite of its modesty, the side managed a further five seasons in level two, after which it relegated in 1995 to the fourth division - two in the same year due to financial irregularities.

11 years after Ukrainian-American businessman Dmitry Piterman had bought the club, saving it from certain bankruptcy, Palamós returned to Segunda División B in 2002, but only lasted two seasons.

== Season to season ==
Season	Tier	Division	Place	Copa del Rey
1943–44	6	2ª Reg.	1st	
1944–45	6	2ª Reg. P.	4th	
1945–46	5	1ª Reg. B	5th	
1946–47	5	2ª Reg.	4th	
1947–48	5	1ª Reg. B	5th	
1948–49	5	1ª Reg. B	1st	
1949–50	4	1ª Reg.	10th	
1950–51	4	1ª Reg.	9th	
1951–52	4	1ª Reg.	13th	
1952–53	4	1ª Reg.	16th	
1953–54	5	2ª Reg.	10th	
1954–1960	DNP			
1960–61	5	2ª Reg.	1st	
1961–62	4	1ª Reg.	4th	
1962–63	4	1ª Reg.	11th	
1963–64	5	2ª Reg.	2nd	
1964–65	4	1ª Reg.	6th	
1965–66	4	1ª Reg.	9th	
1966–67	4	1ª Reg.	5th	
1967–68	4	1ª Reg.	9th	

Season	Tier	Division	Place	Copa del Rey
1968–69	4	Reg. Pref.	12th	
1969–70	4	Reg. Pref.	12th	
1970–71	5	1ª Reg.	2nd	
1971–72	5	1ª Reg.	12th	
1972–73	5	1ª Reg.	12th	
1973–74	5	1ª Reg.	1st	
1974–75	4	Reg. Pref.	17th	
1975–76	5	1ª Reg.	11th	
1976–77	5	1ª Reg.	3rd	
1977–78	5	Reg. Pref.	17th	
1978–79	6	1ª Reg.	4th	
1979–80	6	1ª Reg.	7th	
1980–81	6	1ª Reg.	11th	
1981–82	6	1ª Reg.	5th	
1982–83	6	1ª Reg.	1st	
1983–84	5	Reg. Pref.	12th	
1984–85	5	Reg. Pref.	7th	
1985–86	5	Reg. Pref.	3rd	
1986–87	5	Reg. Pref.	2nd	
1987–88	4	3ª	1st	

Season	Tier	Division	Place	Copa del Rey
1988–89	3	2ª B	1st	
1989–90	2	2ª	8th	First round
1990–91	2	2ª	16th	Fifth round
1991–92	2	2ª	14th	Fifth round
1992–93	2	2ª	14th	Fifth round
1993–94	2	2ª	13th	Fourth round
1994–95	2	2ª	17th	Round of 16
1995–96	4	3ª	4th	First round
1996–97	4	3ª	1st	
1997–98	4	3ª	2nd	
1998–99	3	2ª B	19th	First round
1999–2000	4	3ª	5th	
2000–01	4	3ª	4th	
2001–02	4	3ª	1st	Round of 32
2002–03	3	2ª B	12th	
2003–04	3	2ª B	20th	
2004–05	4	3ª	12th	
2005–06	4	3ª	16th	
2006–07	4	3ª	9th	
2007–08	4	3ª	6th	

Season	Tier	Division	Place	Copa del Rey
2008–09	4	3ª	17th	
2009–10	4	3ª	12th	
2010–11	4	3ª	18th	
2011–12	5	1ª Cat.	3rd	
2012–13	4	3ª	12th	
2013–14	4	3ª	7th	
2014–15	4	3ª	11th	
2015–16	4	3ª	12th	
2016–17	4	3ª	11th	
2017–18	4	3ª	18th	
2018–19	5	1ª Cat.	4th	
2019–20	5	1ª Cat.	3rd	
2020–21	5	1ª Cat.	7th	
2021–22	6	1ª Cat.	8th	
2022–23	6	1ª Cat.	3rd	
2023–24	6	Lliga Elit	11th	
2024–25	6	Lliga Elit	15th	
2025–26	7	1ª Cat.		

- 6 seasons in Segunda División
- 4 seasons in Segunda División B
- 20 seasons in Tercera División

== Honours ==
- Catalonia Cup: 1992
- Third Division: 1988–89
- Fourth Division: 1987–88, 1996–97, 2001–02

== Current squad ==
The numbers are established according to the official website:

As of 4 August 2020

Note: Flags indicate national team as defined under FIFA eligibility rules; some limited exceptions apply. Players may hold more than one non-FIFA nationality.

No.	Pos.	Nation	Player
1	GK	ESP	Albert Quintanas
2	DF	ESP	Sergio García
3	DF	ESP	David Cano (captain)
4	DF	ESP	Ayoub Jaaidi
5	DF	ESP	Biel Pla
6	MF	ESP	Pep Vergara
7	MF	ESP	Pere Espuña
8	MF	ESP	Guillem Cornellà
10	MF	ESP	Alexis Sánchez
11	FW	ESP	Adri Salas

No.	Pos.	Nation	Player}
13	GK	ESP	Mamadou Ndow
14	MF	ESP	Toni Rossell
15	FW	ESP	Dembo Batchilly
17	DF	ESP	Joel Salas
18	DF	ESP	José Martínez
23	FW	ESP	Xevi Germán
—	FW	ESP	Víctor Pajares
—	FW	GAM	Musa Fatty
—	MF	ESP	Marc Viadé
—	MF	ESP	Carles Callicó
—	MF	ESP	Pepe Ollé

== Famous players ==
- (Argentina) Carlos Alfaro Moreno
- (Andorra) Antoni Lima
- (Equatorial Guinea) (Spain) Juan Epitié
- (Russia) (Azerbaijan) Vladislav Lemish
- (Spain) Jordi Condom
- (Spain) Juan Carlos Rojo
- Category:Palamós CF footballers
