= Mata, Iran =

Mata مطاع
- Village
- Location within Iran
- Coordinates: 28°23′47″N 57°32′37″E
- Country: Iran
- Province: Kerman
- County: Anbarabad
- Bakhsh: Esmaili
- Rural District: Esmaili

Population (2006)
  - Total: 79
- Time zone: UTC+3:30 (IRST)
  - Summer (DST): UTC+4:30 (IRDT)

Mata (Persian: مطاع, also Romanized as Maţā‘ and Matā; also known as Mogh Matā) is a village in Esmaili Rural District, Esmaili District, Anbarabad County, Kerman Province, Iran. At the 2006 census, its population was 79, across 16 families.
