= Ilya Kazakov (footballer) =

Russian footballer (born 1978)

Personal information
- Full name: Ilya Sergeyevich Kazakov
- Date of birth: 13 May 1978 (age 48)
- Place of birth: Kirov, Russian SFSR, Soviet Union
- Height: 1.78 m (5 ft 10 in)
- Position: Goalkeeper

Senior career*
Years	Team	Apps	(Gls)
1996–1997	Spartak-Telekom Shuya (amateur)		
1998	Spartak-Telekom Shuya	10	(0)
1999–2001	Saturn Ramenskoye	3	(0)
2000	→ Saturn-d Ramenskoye	23	(0)
2002	Shatura		
2003	Dinamo Brest	3	(0)
- * Club domestic league appearances and goals

Ilya Sergeyevich Kazakov (Russian: Илья Сергеевич Казаков; born 13 May 1978) is a former Russian football player. He was born in Kirov, Kirov Oblast.

Kazakov made his debut in the Russian Premier League on June 23, 1999, in an away match of the 12th round against PFC CSKA, coming on as a substitute after the break for the unsuccessful Valery Chizhov.
