= Igor Lebedev (footballer) =

Russian footballer and coach

Personal information
- Full name: Igor Borisovich Lebedev
- Date of birth: 18 October 1978 (age 48)
- Place of birth: Leningrad, Russian SFSR
- Height: 1.74 m (5 ft 8 1/2 in)
- Positions: Midfielder; defender

Team information
- Current team: FC Zvezda Saint Petersburg (assistant coach)

Senior career*
Years	Team	Apps	(Gls)
1997	FC Lokomotiv-d St. Petersburg	26	(0)
1998	FC SKA St. Petersburg		
1999–2000	FC Lokomotiv St. Petersburg	43	(0)
2001–2005	FC Chkalovets Novosibirsk	106	(5)
2007–2012	FC Chelyabinsk	149	(4)

Managerial career
- 2019–: FC Zvezda Saint Petersburg (assistant)
- * Club domestic league appearances and goals

Igor Borisovich Lebedev (Russian: Игорь Борисович Лебедев; born 18 October 1978) is a Russian professional football coach and a former player. He is an assistant coach with FC Zvezda Saint Petersburg.

== Club career ==
He played two seasons in the Russian Football National League for FC Lokomotiv St. Petersburg.
