= Torre La Mata =

Coordinates: 38°01′N 0°39′W

Torre La Mata
Coat of Arms
Nation	Spain
Region	Valencian Community
Province	Alicante
Comarca	Vega Baja del Segura
Council Area	Torrevieja
Languages	Spanish.
Latitude	38°01'34.61"N
Longitude	0º39'17.51"W
Elevation	29 feet/8.84 metres above sea-level
Population	1221 inhabitants (2005)

Torre La Mata or simply La Mata is a district of Torrevieja located 5 km northeast of the city along the Costa Blanca, in the province of Alicante in southeast Spain. La Mata is often regarded as a dormitory suburb of Torrevieja. Many of the residents are expatriates from the United Kingdom, Germany and other northern European countries. Torre La Mata is renowned by tourists and locals for having an unspoilt Spanish charm, due to the lack of high-rise hotels and local affluence.

== Places of interest ==
- Parque Natural de la Mata - A 'Natural Park' which boasts an abundance of wildlife.
- Paraje Natural Municipal Molino Del Agua - A natural park of the Water Mill
- Cabo Cervera
- Playa de la Mata - La Mata Beach
- Las Salinas-The salt-lakes where salt has been mined for centuries.
