= 2001 Tercera División play-offs =

Spanish football league play-offs

The 2001 Tercera División play-offs to Segunda División B from Tercera División (Promotion play-offs) were the final playoffs for the promotion from 2000–01 Tercera División to 2001–02 Segunda División B. The first four teams in each group (excluding reserve teams) took part in the play-off.

== Format ==
The 68 participating teams were divided into 5 series each made up of 4 groups in the category, with the exception of Series E , which was only formed by Group XII . Each series was divided into 4 groups formed by a 1st, a 2nd, a 3rd and a 4th classified from each group, which played a double-round playoff. Each victory was equivalent to 3 points, the tie to 1 point and the defeat to 0 points. The champion of each group obtained the promotion to Second Division B.

The distribution of each series was as follows:

Series A:

- Group I – Galicia (Galicia (Spain))
- Group II – Asturias
- Group VII – Community of Madrid
- Group VIII – Castile and León

Series B:

- Group III – Cantabria
- Group IV – Basque Country (Basque Country (autonomous community))
- Group XV – La Rioja and Navarre
- Group XVI – Aragon

Series C:

- Group V – Catalonia
- Group VI – Valencian Community
- Group XI – Balearic Islands
- Gruoup XIII – Region of Murcia

Series D:

- Group IX – Eastern Andalusia and Melilla
- Group X – Western Andalusia and Ceuta
- Group XIV – Extremadura
- Group XVII – Castilla–La Mancha

Series E:

- Group XII – Canary Islands

== Teams for 2000–01 play-offs ==
| Group I – Galicia (Galicia (Spain)) | Group II – Asturias | Group III – Cantabria | Group IV – Basque Country (Basque Country (autonomous community)) | Group V – Catalonia |
|---|---|---|---|---|
| 1st Celta de Vigo B | 1st Marino de Luanco | 1st SD Noja | 1st SD Lemona | 1st CF Gavà |
| 2nd CD Endesa As Pontes | 2nd Real Oviedo B | 2nd SD Laredo | 2nd Real Sociedad B | 2nd CF Balaguer |
| 3rd Ponte Ourense CF | 3rd UP Langreo | 3rd SD Textil Escudo | 3rd Sestao River Club | 3rd CE Europa |
| 4th UD Xove Lago | 4th CD Lealtad | 4th CD Bezana | 4th CD Aurrerá Ondarroa | 4th Palamós CF |

| Group VI – Valencian Community | Group VII – Community of Madrid | Group VIII – Castile and León | Group IX – E. Andalusia and Melilla | Group X – W. Andalusia and Ceuta |
|---|---|---|---|---|
| 1st Alicante CF | 1st CF Rayo Majadahonda | 1st CF Palencia | 1st UD Marbella | 1st Sevilla FC B |
| 2nd Valencia CF B | 2nd CD Las Rozas | 2nd Real Valladolid B | 2nd Málaga CF B | 2nd Real Betis B |
| 3rd CD Onda | 3rd CD Móstoles | 3rd UD Salamanca B | 3rd Torredonjimeno CF | 3rd Atlético Lucentino Industrial |
| 4th Pego CF | 5th RSD Alcalá | 4th SD Gimnástica Segoviana | 4th CP Granada 74 | 4th Atlético Sanluqueño CF |

| Group XI – Balearic Islands | Group XII – Canary Islands | Group XIII – Region of Murcia | Group XIV – Extremadura | Group XV – Navarre and La Rioja |
|---|---|---|---|---|
| 1st CD Atlético Baleares | 1st UD Lanzarote | 1st CF Ciudad de Murcia | 1st CD Díter Zafra | 1st CD Logroñés |
| 3rd CF Villafranca | 2nd SD Tenisca | 2nd Orihuela CF | 2nd UD Mérida | 2nd CD Mirandés |
| 4th CD Manacor | 3rd UD Las Palmas B | 3rd Yeclano CF | 3rd UP Plasencia | 3rd CD Alfaro |
| 5th CD Constancia | 4th CD San Isidro | 4th Lorca CF | 4th CP Cacereño | 4th CD Izarra |

| Group XVI – Aragon | Group XVII – Castilla–La Mancha |
|---|---|
| 1st CD Teruel | 1st CD Quintanar del Rey |
| 2nd CF Figueruelas | 2nd CP Villarrobledo |
| 3rd UD Fraga | 3rd Hellín Deportivo |
| 4th SD Huesca | 4th CD Cuenca |

== Tables and Results ==
=== Group A-1 ===
| Pos | Team | Pld | W | D | L | GF | GA | GD | Pts | Qualification or relegation |
|---|---|---|---|---|---|---|---|---|---|---|
| 1 | (Asturias) Real Oviedo B (substituted on) | 6 | 5 | 0 | 1 | 8 | 3 | +5 | 15 | Promoted to Segunda División B |
| 2 | (Community of Madrid) CF Rayo Majadahonda | 6 | 4 | 1 | 1 | 13 | 5 | +8 | 13 | |
| 3 | (Castile and León) SD Gimnástica Segoviana | 6 | 2 | 1 | 3 | 8 | 12 | −4 | 7 | |
| 4 | (Galicia (Spain)) Ponte Ourense CF | 6 | 0 | 0 | 6 | 3 | 12 | −9 | 0 | |

Source: Fútbol Regional

| Home \ Away | GMS | OVI | POU | RMJ |
|---|---|---|---|---|
| SD Gim. Segoviana | — | 0–1 | 3–2 | 1–1 |
| Real Oviedo B | 2–0 | — | 1–0 | 0–2 |
| Ponte Ourense CF | 0–3 | 0–2 | — | 0–1 |
| Rayo Majadahonda | 6–1 | 1–2 | 2–1 | — |

Updated to match(es) played on completed. Source: FutbolMe
Legend: Blue = home team win; Yellow = draw; Red = away team win.

=== Group A-2 ===
| Pos | Team | Pld | W | D | L | GF | GA | GD | Pts | Qualification or relegation |
|---|---|---|---|---|---|---|---|---|---|---|
| 1 | (Galicia (Spain)) Celta de Vigo B (substituted on) | 6 | 5 | 1 | 0 | 10 | 4 | +6 | 16 | Promoted to Segunda División B |
| 2 | (Asturias) CD Lealtad | 6 | 2 | 1 | 3 | 7 | 8 | −1 | 7 | |
| 3 | (Community of Madrid) CD Las Rozas | 6 | 1 | 3 | 2 | 6 | 7 | −1 | 6 | |
| 4 | (Castile and León) UD Salamanca B | 6 | 1 | 1 | 4 | 6 | 10 | −4 | 4 | |

Source: Fútbol Regional

| Home \ Away | CEL | LRO | LEA | SAL |
|---|---|---|---|---|
| Celta de Vigo B | — | 3–1 | 2–1 | 2–1 |
| CD Las Rozas | 0–0 | — | 1–1 | 1–3 |
| CD Lealtad | 0–1 | 0–3 | — | 3–1 |
| UD Salamanca B | 1–2 | 0–0 | 0–2 | — |

Updated to match(es) played on completed. Source: FutbolMe
Legend: Blue = home team win; Yellow = draw; Red = away team win.

=== Group A-3 ===
| Pos | Team | Pld | W | D | L | GF | GA | GD | Pts | Qualification or relegation |
|---|---|---|---|---|---|---|---|---|---|---|
| 1 | (Community of Madrid) RSD Alcalá (substituted on) | 6 | 4 | 1 | 1 | 10 | 4 | +6 | 13 | Promoted to Segunda División B |
| 2 | (Asturias) UP Langreo | 6 | 2 | 2 | 2 | 5 | 6 | −1 | 8 | |
| 3 | (Galicia (Spain)) CD Endesa As Pontes | 6 | 2 | 1 | 3 | 3 | 7 | −4 | 7 | |
| 4 | (Castile and León) CF Palencia | 6 | 1 | 2 | 3 | 4 | 5 | −1 | 5 | |

Source: Fútbol Regional

| Home \ Away | ALC | EAP | LAN | PAL |
|---|---|---|---|---|
| RSD Alcalá | — | 2–0 | 3–0 | 2–1 |
| CD Endesa As Pontes | 1–0 | — | 2–0 | 0–0 |
| UP Langreo | 1–1 | 3–0 | — | 1–0 |
| CF Palencia | 1–2 | 2–0 | 0–0 | — |

Updated to match(es) played on completed. Source: FutbolMe
Legend: Blue = home team win; Yellow = draw; Red = away team win.

=== Group A-4 ===
| Pos | Team | Pld | W | D | L | GF | GA | GD | Pts | Qualification or relegation |
|---|---|---|---|---|---|---|---|---|---|---|
| 1 | (Asturias) Marino de Luanco (substituted on) | 6 | 3 | 2 | 1 | 11 | 8 | +3 | 11 | Promoted to Segunda División B |
| 2 | (Community of Madrid) CD Móstoles | 6 | 3 | 2 | 1 | 9 | 2 | +7 | 11 | |
| 3 | (Castile and León) Real Valladolid B | 6 | 2 | 1 | 3 | 7 | 13 | −6 | 7 | |
| 4 | (Galicia (Spain)) UD Xove Lago | 6 | 1 | 1 | 4 | 8 | 12 | −4 | 4 | |

Source: Fútbol Regional

| Home \ Away | MAR | MOS | VLL | XLA |
|---|---|---|---|---|
| Marino de Luanco | — | 1–0 | 2–1 | 1–1 |
| CD Móstoles | 0–0 | — | 6–0 | 2–1 |
| Real Valladolid B | 3–2 | 0–0 | — | 3–1 |
| UD Xove Lago | 3–5 | 0–1 | 2–0 | — |

Updated to match(es) played on completed. Source: FutbolMe
Legend: Blue = home team win; Yellow = draw; Red = away team win.

=== Group B-1 ===
| Pos | Team | Pld | W | D | L | GF | GA | GD | Pts | Qualification or relegation |
|---|---|---|---|---|---|---|---|---|---|---|
| 1 | (La Rioja) CD Logroñés (substituted on) | 6 | 5 | 1 | 0 | 11 | 3 | +8 | 16 | Promoted to Segunda División B |
| 2 | (Basque Country (autonomous community)) Sestao River Club | 6 | 3 | 2 | 1 | 13 | 4 | +9 | 11 | |
| 3 | (Aragon) CF Figueruelas | 6 | 1 | 1 | 4 | 3 | 13 | −10 | 4 | |
| 4 | (Cantabria) CD Bezana | 6 | 0 | 2 | 4 | 5 | 12 | −7 | 2 | |

Source: Fútbol Regional

| Home \ Away | BEZ | FIG | LOG | SRC |
|---|---|---|---|---|
| CD Bezana | — | 1–1 | 1–3 | 0–0 |
| CF Figueruelas | 2–0 | — | 0–1 | 0–5 |
| CD Logroñés | 3–1 | 2–0 | — | 1–0 |
| Sestao River | 3–2 | 4–0 | 1–1 | — |

Updated to match(es) played on completed. Source: FutbolMe
Legend: Blue = home team win; Yellow = draw; Red = away team win.

=== Group B-2 ===
| Pos | Team | Pld | W | D | L | GF | GA | GD | Pts | Qualification or relegation |
|---|---|---|---|---|---|---|---|---|---|---|
| 1 | (Basque Country (autonomous community)) Real Sociedad B (substituted on) | 6 | 4 | 0 | 2 | 9 | 3 | +6 | 12 | Promoted to Segunda División B |
| 2 | (Cantabria) SD Noja | 6 | 3 | 2 | 1 | 12 | 5 | +7 | 11 | |
| 3 | (Navarre) CD Izarra | 6 | 2 | 2 | 2 | 4 | 4 | 0 | 8 | |
| 4 | (Aragon) UD Fraga | 6 | 1 | 0 | 5 | 4 | 17 | −13 | 3 | |

Source: Fútbol Regional

| Home \ Away | FRA | IZA | NOJ | RSO |
|---|---|---|---|---|
| UD Fraga | — | 0–2 | 0–4 | 0–2 |
| CD Izarra | 0–1 | — | 0–0 | 1–0 |
| SD Noja | 5–3 | 1–1 | — | 2–0 |
| Real Sociedad B | 4–0 | 2–0 | 1–0 | — |

Updated to match(es) played on completed. Source: FutbolMe
Legend: Blue = home team win; Yellow = draw; Red = away team win.

=== Group B-3 ===
| Pos | Team | Pld | W | D | L | GF | GA | GD | Pts | Qualification or relegation |
|---|---|---|---|---|---|---|---|---|---|---|
| 1 | (La Rioja) CD Alfaro (substituted on) | 6 | 4 | 1 | 1 | 18 | 9 | +9 | 13 | Promoted to Segunda División B |
| 2 | (Basque Country (autonomous community)) CD Aurrerá Ondarroa | 6 | 4 | 0 | 2 | 10 | 8 | +2 | 12 | |
| 3 | (Aragon) CD Teruel | 6 | 2 | 1 | 3 | 11 | 17 | −6 | 7 | |
| 4 | (Cantabria) CD Laredo | 6 | 1 | 0 | 5 | 9 | 14 | −5 | 3 | |

Source: Fútbol Regional

| Home \ Away | ALF | AON | LAR | TER |
|---|---|---|---|---|
| CD Alfaro | — | 5–1 | 3–0 | 4–1 |
| CD Aurrerá Ondarroa | 2–0 | — | 4–1 | 1–0 |
| CD Laredo | 1–2 | 0–1 | — | 5–1 |
| CD Teruel | 4–4 | 2–1 | 3–2 | — |

Updated to match(es) played on completed. Source: FutbolMe
Legend: Blue = home team win; Yellow = draw; Red = away team win.

=== Group B-4 ===
| Pos | Team | Pld | W | D | L | GF | GA | GD | Pts | Qualification or relegation |
|---|---|---|---|---|---|---|---|---|---|---|
| 1 | (Aragon) SD Huesca (substituted on) | 6 | 5 | 0 | 1 | 14 | 7 | +7 | 15 | Promoted to Segunda División B |
| 2 | (Basque Country (autonomous community)) SD Lemona | 6 | 4 | 1 | 1 | 17 | 5 | +12 | 13 | |
| 3 | (Castile and León) CD Mirandés | 6 | 2 | 1 | 3 | 6 | 5 | +1 | 7 | |
| 4 | (Cantabria) SD Textil Escudo | 6 | 0 | 0 | 6 | 3 | 23 | −20 | 0 | |

Source: Fútbol Regional

| Home \ Away | HUE | LEM | MIR | TEX |
|---|---|---|---|---|
| SD Huesca | — | 3–0 | 2–1 | 3–1 |
| SD Lemona | 4–0 | — | 1–0 | 4–0 |
| CD Mirandés | 0–1 | 1–1 | — | 2–0 |
| SD Textil Escudo | 1–5 | 1–7 | 0–2 | — |

Updated to match(es) played on completed. Source: FutbolMe
Legend: Blue = home team win; Yellow = draw; Red = away team win.

=== Group C-1 ===
| Pos | Team | Pld | W | D | L | GF | GA | GD | Pts | Qualification or relegation |
|---|---|---|---|---|---|---|---|---|---|---|
| 1 | (Valencian Community) Alicante CF (substituted on) | 6 | 5 | 1 | 0 | 13 | 0 | +13 | 16 | Promoted to Segunda División B |
| 2 | (Region of Murcia) Lorca CF | 6 | 3 | 0 | 3 | 9 | 9 | 0 | 9 | |
| 3 | (Catalonia) CE Europa | 6 | 2 | 2 | 2 | 7 | 8 | −1 | 8 | |
| 4 | (Balearic Islands) CF Villafranca | 6 | 0 | 1 | 5 | 2 | 14 | −12 | 1 | |

Source: Fútbol Regional

| Home \ Away | ALI | EUR | LOR | VFR |
|---|---|---|---|---|
| Alicante CF | — | 4–0 | 1–0 | 4–0 |
| CE Europa | 0–0 | — | 4–0 | 1–1 |
| Lorca CF | 0–2 | 3–1 | — | 3–0 |
| CF Villafranca | 0–2 | 0–1 | 1–3 | — |

Updated to match(es) played on completed. Source: FutbolMe
Legend: Blue = home team win; Yellow = draw; Red = away team win.

=== Group C-2 ===
| Pos | Team | Pld | W | D | L | GF | GA | GD | Pts | Qualification or relegation |
|---|---|---|---|---|---|---|---|---|---|---|
| 1 | (Valencian Community) Valencia CF B (substituted on) | 6 | 6 | 0 | 0 | 15 | 3 | +12 | 18 | Promoted to Segunda División B |
| 2 | (Catalonia) CF Gavà | 6 | 2 | 1 | 3 | 10 | 8 | +2 | 7 | |
| 3 | (Region of Murcia) Yeclano CF | 6 | 2 | 1 | 3 | 6 | 4 | +2 | 7 | |
| 4 | (Balearic Islands) CD Constancia | 6 | 1 | 0 | 5 | 3 | 19 | −16 | 3 | |

Source: Fútbol Regional

| Home \ Away | CON | GAV | VAL | YEC |
|---|---|---|---|---|
| CD Constancia | — | 2–6 | 0–2 | 0–2 |
| CF Gavà | 0–1 | — | 2–3 | 1–0 |
| Valencia CF B | 5–0 | 2–1 | — | 2–0 |
| Yeclano CF | 4–0 | 0–0 | 0–1 | — |

Updated to match(es) played on completed. Source: FutbolMe
Legend: Blue = home team win; Yellow = draw; Red = away team win.

=== Group C-3 ===
| Pos | Team | Pld | W | D | L | GF | GA | GD | Pts | Qualification or relegation |
|---|---|---|---|---|---|---|---|---|---|---|
| 1 | (Region of Murcia) CF Ciudad de Murcia (substituted on) | 6 | 4 | 1 | 1 | 9 | 6 | +3 | 13 | Promoted to Segunda División B |
| 2 | (Balearic Islands) CD Manacor | 6 | 3 | 1 | 2 | 12 | 9 | +3 | 10 | |
| 3 | (Catalonia) CF Balaguer | 6 | 2 | 0 | 4 | 9 | 11 | −2 | 6 | |
| 4 | (Valencian Community) Pego CF | 6 | 2 | 0 | 4 | 9 | 13 | −4 | 6 | |

Source: Fútbol Regional

| Home \ Away | BAL | CMU | MAN | PEG |
|---|---|---|---|---|
| CF Balaguer | — | 4–0 | 0–3 | 1–0 |
| CF Ciudad de Murcia | 2–1 | — | 1–1 | 1–0 |
| CD Manacor | 2–0 | 0–3 | — | 4–2 |
| Pego CF | 4–3 | 0–2 | 3–2 | — |

Updated to match(es) played on completed. Source: FutbolMe
Legend: Blue = home team win; Yellow = draw; Red = away team win.

=== Group C-4 ===
| Pos | Team | Pld | W | D | L | GF | GA | GD | Pts | Qualification or relegation |
|---|---|---|---|---|---|---|---|---|---|---|
| 1 | (Valencian Community) CD Onda (substituted on) | 6 | 3 | 3 | 0 | 12 | 8 | +4 | 12 | Promoted to Segunda División B |
| 2 | (Valencian Community) Orihuela CF | 6 | 2 | 3 | 1 | 11 | 9 | +2 | 9 | |
| 3 | (Catalonia) Palamós CF | 6 | 2 | 2 | 2 | 12 | 13 | −1 | 8 | |
| 4 | (Balearic Islands) CD Atlético Baleares | 6 | 0 | 2 | 4 | 7 | 12 | −5 | 2 | |

Source: Fútbol Regional

| Home \ Away | BAL | OND | ORI | PAL |
|---|---|---|---|---|
| CD Atlético Baleares | — | 0–1 | 1–2 | 2–4 |
| CD Onda | 2–1 | — | 1–1 | 4–2 |
| Orihuela CF | 2–2 | 2–2 | — | 4–2 |
| Palamós CF | 1–1 | 2–2 | 1–0 | — |

Updated to match(es) played on completed. Source: FutbolMe
Legend: Blue = home team win; Yellow = draw; Red = away team win.

=== Group D-1 ===
| Pos | Team | Pld | W | D | L | GF | GA | GD | Pts | Qualification or relegation |
|---|---|---|---|---|---|---|---|---|---|---|
| 1 | (Extremadura) UD Mérida Promesas (substituted on) | 6 | 3 | 3 | 0 | 12 | 7 | +5 | 12 | Promoted to Segunda División B |
| 2 | (Andalusia) Atlético Sanluqueño CF | 6 | 3 | 1 | 2 | 12 | 6 | +6 | 10 | |
| 3 | (Andalusia) Torredonjimeno CF | 6 | 2 | 2 | 2 | 4 | 7 | −3 | 8 | |
| 4 | (Castilla–La Mancha) CD Quintanar del Rey | 6 | 0 | 2 | 4 | 5 | 13 | −8 | 2 | |

Source: Fútbol Regional

| Home \ Away | MEP | QDR | ASL | TDJ |
|---|---|---|---|---|
| UD Mérida Promesas | — | 2–1 | 2–2 | 3–0 |
| CD Quintanar del Rey | 2–2 | — | 0–1 | 0–1 |
| Atlético Sanluqueño CF | 1–2 | 6–1 | — | 2–0 |
| Torredonjimeno CF | 1–1 | 1–1 | 1–0 | — |

Updated to match(es) played on completed. Source: FutbolMe
Legend: Blue = home team win; Yellow = draw; Red = away team win.

=== Group D-2 ===
| Pos | Team | Pld | W | D | L | GF | GA | GD | Pts | Qualification or relegation |
|---|---|---|---|---|---|---|---|---|---|---|
| 1 | (Andalusia) Real Betis B (substituted on) | 6 | 5 | 0 | 1 | 17 | 6 | +11 | 15 | Promoted to Segunda División B |
| 2 | (Andalusia) UD Marbella | 6 | 3 | 0 | 3 | 13 | 13 | 0 | 9 | |
| 3 | (Castilla–La Mancha) CD Cuenca | 6 | 3 | 0 | 3 | 8 | 13 | −5 | 9 | |
| 4 | (Extremadura) UP Plasencia | 6 | 1 | 0 | 5 | 6 | 12 | −6 | 3 | |

Source: Fútbol Regional

| Home \ Away | BET | CUE | MAR | PLA |
|---|---|---|---|---|
| Real Betis B | — | 2–0 | 6–1 | 1–0 |
| CD Cuenca | 2–4 | — | 2–1 | 3–2 |
| UD Marbella | 3–1 | 4–0 | — | 2–1 |
| UP Plasencia | 0–3 | 0–1 | 3–2 | — |

Updated to match(es) played on completed. Source: FutbolMe
Legend: Blue = home team win; Yellow = draw; Red = away team win.

=== Group D-3 ===
| Pos | Team | Pld | W | D | L | GF | GA | GD | Pts | Qualification or relegation |
|---|---|---|---|---|---|---|---|---|---|---|
| 1 | (Andalusia) Sevilla FC B (substituted on) | 6 | 6 | 0 | 0 | 13 | 4 | +9 | 18 | Promoted to Segunda División B |
| 2 | (Castilla–La Mancha) Hellín Deportivo | 6 | 3 | 1 | 2 | 9 | 7 | +2 | 10 | |
| 3 | (Andalusia) Málaga CF B | 6 | 1 | 1 | 4 | 7 | 8 | −1 | 4 | |
| 4 | (Extremadura) CP Cacereño | 6 | 1 | 0 | 5 | 5 | 15 | −10 | 3 | |

Source: Fútbol Regional

| Home \ Away | CAC | HEL | MGA | SEV |
|---|---|---|---|---|
| CP Cacereño | — | 2–3 | 1–0 | 0–2 |
| Hellín Deportivo | 1–0 | — | 2–0 | 1–2 |
| Málaga CF B | 5–1 | 1–1 | — | 1–2 |
| Sevilla FC B | 4–1 | 2–1 | 1–0 | — |

Updated to match(es) played on completed. Source: FutbolMe
Legend: Blue = home team win; Yellow = draw; Red = away team win.

=== Group D-4 ===
| Pos | Team | Pld | W | D | L | GF | GA | GD | Pts | Qualification or relegation |
|---|---|---|---|---|---|---|---|---|---|---|
| 1 | (Extremadura) CD Díter Zafra (substituted on) | 6 | 4 | 0 | 2 | 9 | 6 | +3 | 12 | Promoted to Segunda División B |
| 2 | (Andalusia) Atlético Lucentino Industrial | 6 | 2 | 2 | 2 | 7 | 8 | −1 | 8 | |
| 3 | (Andalusia) CP Granada 74 | 6 | 2 | 1 | 3 | 6 | 8 | −2 | 7 | |
| 4 | (Castilla–La Mancha) CP Villarrobledo | 6 | 2 | 1 | 3 | 5 | 5 | 0 | 7 | |

Source: Fútbol Regional

| Home \ Away | DZA | G74 | ALU | VRB |
|---|---|---|---|---|
| CD Díter Zafra | — | 2–0 | 3–1 | 1–0 |
| CP Granada 74 | 2–3 | — | 2–2 | 1–0 |
| Atl. Lucentino Ind. | 1–0 | 1–0 | — | 0–1 |
| CP Villarrobledo | 2–0 | 0–1 | 2–2 | — |

Updated to match(es) played on completed. Source: FutbolMe
Legend: Blue = home team win; Yellow = draw; Red = away team win.

=== Group E ===
| Pos | Team | Pld | W | D | L | GF | GA | GD | Pts | Qualification or relegation |
|---|---|---|---|---|---|---|---|---|---|---|
| 1 | (Canary Islands) UD Lanzarote (substituted on) | 6 | 3 | 2 | 1 | 5 | 1 | +4 | 11 | Promoted to Segunda División B |
| 2 | (Canary Islands) SD Tenisca | 6 | 3 | 1 | 2 | 7 | 6 | +1 | 10 | |
| 3 | (Canary Islands) UD Las Palmas B | 6 | 2 | 1 | 3 | 8 | 8 | 0 | 7 | |
| 4 | (Canary Islands) CD San Isidro | 6 | 1 | 2 | 3 | 3 | 8 | −5 | 5 | |

Source: Fútbol Regional

| Home \ Away | LNZ | LPA | SID | TNS |
|---|---|---|---|---|
| UD Lanzarote | — | 2–0 | 1–0 | 2–0 |
| UD Las Palmas B | 1–0 | — | 4–0 | 1–3 |
| CD San Isidro | 0–0 | 1–1 | — | 2–0 |
| SD Tenisca | 0–0 | 2–1 | 2–0 | — |

Updated to match(es) played on completed. Source: FutbolMe
Legend: Blue = home team win; Yellow = draw; Red = away team win.

== Teams Promoted ==
Group I – Galicia (Galicia (Spain))

- Celta de Vigo B

Group II – Asturias

- Club Marino de Luanco
- Real Oviedo B

Group III – Cantabria

- None

Group IV – Basque Country (Basque Country (autonomous community))

- Real Sociedad B

Group V – Catalonia

- None

Group VI – Valencian Community

- Alicante CF
- Valencia CF B
- CD Onda

Group VII – Community of Madrid

- RSD Alcalá

Group VIII – Castile and León

- None

Group IX – E. Andalusia and Melilla

- None

Group X – W. Andalusia and Ceuta

- Sevilla FC B
- Real Betis B

Group XI – Balearic Islands

- None

Group XII – Canary Islands

- UD Lanzarote

Group XIII – Region of Murcia

- CF Ciudad de Murcia

Group XIV – Extremadura

- CD Díter Zafra
- UD Mérida Promesas

Group XV – Navarre and La Rioja

- CD Logroñés
- CD Alfaro

Group XVI – Aragon

- SD Huesca

Group XVII – Castilla–La Mancha

- None
