= 2006 Tercera División play-offs =

Spanish football league play-offs

The 2006 Tercera División play-offs to Segunda División B from Tercera División (Promotion play-offs) were the final playoffs for the promotion from 2005–06 Tercera División to 2006–07 Segunda División B. In some groups four teams took part in the play-off while other groups have only three.

- The teams highlighted in yellow played the Liguilla de Ascenso to Segunda División B.
- The teams highlighted in red were relegated to Regional Divisions.

== Groups A ==
- Teams from Galicia, Asturias, Castile y León and Madrid.

Teams - Group 1 (Galicia)	Pts
Deportivo de La Coruña B	93
CD Lugo	86
Laracha CF	74
Alondras CF	69
Viveiro CF	23
SD O Val	22
Caselas CF	13

Teams - Group 2 (Asturias)	Pts
AD Universidad de Oviedo	81
UP Langreo	78
Ribadesella CF	75
CD Lealtad	71
Real Tapia CF	34
CF Berrón	32
Real Titánico	11

Teams - Group 7 (Community of Madrid)	Pts
Real Madrid C	80
AD Parla	75
CD Cobeña	66
Getafe CF B	65
Real Carabanchel	44
CD Colonia Moscardó	38
CD Leganés B	32
Real Aranjuez	25

Teams - Group 8 (Castile y León)	Pts
Gimnástica Segoviana CF	97
CD Mirandés	89
CD Guijuelo	83
CD Huracan Z	78
Atlético Tordesillas	31
Cultural Cebrereña	20
SD Almazán	18

=== Group A1 ===
- 1st Eliminatory:

June 4, 2006 Home Matches:
Cobeña	3-1	Mirandés
Lealtad	1-2	Deportivo B

June 11, 2006 Away Matches:
Mirandés	1-2	Cobeña	Agg:2-5
Deportivo B	1-0	Lealtad	Agg:3-1

- 2nd Eliminatory:

June 18, 2006 Home Matches:
Cobeña	0-0	Deportivo B

June 25, 2006 Away Match:
Deportivo B	1-1	Cobeña	Agg:1-1

  - Promoted to Segunda División B:Cobeña

=== Group A2 ===
- 1st Eliminatory:

June 4, 2006 Home Matches:
Getafe B	0-1	Gimnástica Segoviana
Ribadesella	1-1	Lugo

June 11, 2006 Away Matches:
Gimnástica Segoviana	2-0	Getafe B	Agg:3-0
Lugo	3-2	Ribadesella	Agg:4-3

- 2nd Eliminatory:

June 18, 2006 Home Matches:
Lugo	3-1	Gimnástica Segoviana

June 25, 2006 Away Match:
Gimnástica Segoviana	1-1	Lugo	Agg:2-4

  - Promoted to Segunda División B:Lugo

=== Group A3 ===
- 1st Eliminatory:

June 4, 2006 Home Matches:
Guijuelo	2-0	Langreo
Alondras	1-2	Real Madrid C

June 11, 2006 Away Matches:
Langreo	1-2	Guijuelo	Agg:1-4
Real Madrid C	0-0	Alondras	Agg:2-1

- 2nd Eliminatory:

June 18, 2006 Home Matches:
Guijuelo	1-0	Real Madrid C

June 25, 2006 Away Match:
Real Madrid C	2-1	Guijuelo	Agg:2-2

  - Promoted to Segunda División B:Guijuelo

=== Group A4 ===
- 1st Eliminatory:

June 4, 2006 Home Matches:
Laracha	0-3	Parla
Huracán Z	0-1	Universidad de Oviedo

June 11, 2006 Away Matches:
Parla	2-0	Laracha	Agg:5-0
Universidad de Oviedo	1-0	Huracán Z	Agg:2-0

- 2nd Eliminatory:

June 18, 2006 Home Matches:
Parla	2-1	Universidad de Oviedo

June 25, 2006 Away Match:
Universidad de Oviedo	4-2	Parla	Agg:5-4

  - Promoted to Segunda División B:Universidad de Oviedo

== Groups B ==
- Teams of Cantabria, Basque Country, Navarre, La Rioja and Aragon.

Teams - Group 3 (Cantabria)	Pts
RS Gimnástica de Torrelavega	86
UM Escobedo	77
CD Bezana	75
SD Noja	74
Vimenor CF	35
SD Revilla	34
CD Barquereño	14

Teams - Group 4 (Basque Country)	Pts
Sestao River Club	90
SD Gernika	69
SD Amorebieta	67
Arenas de Getxo	64
CD Aurrerá Vitoria	47
SD Zamudio	41
SD Indautxu	38
CD Getxo	33
Aurrerá de Ondarroa	30
Salvatierra SD	23

Teams - Group 15N (Navarre)	Pts
Peña Sport FC	78
CD Iruña	71
Lagun Artea KE	38
Atlético Artajones	36
CD Beti Onak	33
CD San Juan	26

Teams - Group 15LR (La Rioja)	Pts
AD Fundación Logroñes	85
CD Logroñés	82
CD Berceo	27
CD Villegas	19
CCD Alberite	16

Teams - Group 16 (Aragon)	Pts
CD Universidad de Zaragoza	67
UD Barbastro	66
Andorra CF	64
AD Sabiñanigo	62
CD La Almunia	47
CD Mallén	42
CD Fuentes	36
FC Lalueza	19

=== Group B1 ===
- 1st Eliminatory:

June 4, 2006 Home Matches:
Arenas Club de Getxo	1-0	Universidad de Zaragoza
CD Logroñés	2-0	UM Escobedo

June 11, 2006 Away Matches:
Universidad de Zaragoza	2-0	Arenas Club de Getxo	Agg:2-1
UM Escobedo	1-0	CD Logroñés	Agg:1-2

- 2nd Eliminatory:

June 18, 2006 Home Matches:
CD Logroñés	4-0	Universidad de Zaragoza

June 25, 2006 Away Match:
Universidad de Zaragoza	2-1	CD Logroñés	Agg:2-5

  - Promoted to Segunda División B:CD Logroñés
  - Relegated to Regional Preferente:Universidad de Zaragoza (Zaragoza B was relegated from Segunda División B)

=== Group B2 ===
- 1st Eliminatory:

June 4, 2006 Home Matches:
CD Bezana	1-2	Peña Sport FC
AD Sabiñánigo	1-4	Sestao River Club

June 11, 2006 Away Matches:
Peña Sport FC	2-1	CD Bezana	Agg:4-2
Sestao River Club	1-1	AD Sabiñánigo	Agg:5-2

- 2nd Eliminatory:

June 18, 2006 Home Matches:
Peña Sport FC	2-2	Sestao River Club

June 25, 2006 Away Match:
Sestao River Club	0-0	Peña Sport FC	Agg:2-2

  - Promoted to Segunda División B:Sestao River Club

=== Group B3 ===
- 1st Eliminatory:

June 4, 2006 Home Matches:
CD Iruña	1-2	Gimnástica Torrelavega
Andorra CF	1-1	Gernika Club

June 11, 2006 Away Matches:
Gimnástica Torrelavega	3-0	CD Iruña	Agg:5-1
Gernika Club	0-0	Andorra CF	Agg:1-1

- 2nd Eliminatory:

June 18, 2006 Home Matches:
Gernika Club	0-1	Gimnástica Torrelavega

June 25, 2006 Away Match:
Gimnástica Torrelavega	3-0	Gernika Club	Agg:4-0

  - Promoted to Segunda División B:Gimnástica Torrelavega

=== Group B4 ===
- 1st Eliminatory:

June 4, 2006 Home Matches:
SD Noja	1-0	AD Fundación Logroñés
SD Amorebieta	0-0	UD Barbastro

June 11, 2006 Away Matches:
AD Fundación Logroñés	2-1	SD Noja	Agg:2-2
UD Barbastro	3-2	SD Amorebieta	Agg:3-2

- 2nd Eliminatory:

June 18, 2006 Home Matches:
SD Noja	1-2	UD Barbastro

June 25, 2006 Away Match:
UD Barbastro	2-0	SD Noja	Agg:4-1

  - Promoted to Segunda División B:UD Barbastro

== Groups C ==
- Teams of Catalonia, Valencia, Balearic Islands and Murcia.

Teams - Group 5(Catalonia)	Pts
Girona	84
Espanyol B	82
Gava	67
Vilanova	66
Figueres	36
Rubi	33
Granollers	31

Teams - Group 6(Valencia)	Pts
Villarreal B	100
Valencia B	89
Eldense	80
Denia	76
Burriana	39
Gandia	39
Benicassim	37
Santa Pola	34

Teams - Group 11 (Balearic Islands)	Pts
Santa Eulalia	88
Mallorca B	86
Ferriolense	84
Sporting Mahonés	83
Platges Calvià	38
Paguera	35
Felanitx	31
Arenal	30

Teams - Group 13 (Region of Murcia)	Pts
Orihuela	85
Mar Menor	74
Pinatar	69
Cartagena Promesas	66
Muleño	33
Balsicas	33
Santomera	18

=== Group C1 ===
- 1st Eliminatory:

June 4, 2006 Home Matches:
CF Gavà	1-0	Mallorca B
CD Dénia	1-0	Orihuela CF

June 11, 2006 Away Matches:
Mallorca B	2-0	CF Gavà	Agg:2-1
Orihuela CF	3-1	CD Dénia	Agg:3-2

- 2nd Eliminatory:

June 18, 2006 Home Matches:
Mallorca B	1-2	Orihuela CF

June 25, 2006 Away Match:
Orihuela CF	0-0	Mallorca B	Agg:2-1

  - Promoted to Segunda División B:Orihuela CF

=== Group C2 ===
- 1st Eliminatory:

June 4, 2006 Home Matches:
CD Eldense	2-1	Mar Menor
Sporting Mahonés	0-1	Girona FC

June 11, 2006 Away Matches:
Mar Menor	1-3	CD Eldense	Agg:2-5
Girona FC	0-0	Sporting Mahonés	Agg:1-0

- 2nd Eliminatory:

June 18, 2006 Home Matches:
CD Eldense	1-0	Girona FC

June 25, 2006 Away Match:
Girona FC	0-2	CD Eldense	Agg:0-3

  - Promoted to Segunda División B:CD Eldense

=== Group C3 ===
- 1st Eliminatory:

June 4, 2006 Home Matches:
Vilanova	2-1	Santa Eulàlia
Pinatar CF	0-1	Valencia B

June 11, 2006 Away Matches:
Santa Eulàlia	0-2	Vilanova	Agg:1-4
Valencia B	2-0	Pinatar CF	Agg:3-0

- 2nd Eliminatory:

June 18, 2006 Home Matches:
Vilanova	1-0	Valencia B

June 25, 2006 Away Match:
Valencia B	2-0	Vilanova	Agg:2-1

  - Promoted to Segunda División B:Valencia B

=== Group C4 ===
- 1st Eliminatory:

June 4, 2006 Home Matches:
Cartagena Promesas CF	1-3	Villarreal B
CD Ferriolense	1-0	Espanyol B

June 11, 2006 Away Matches:
Villarreal B	3-1	Cartagena Promesas CF	Agg:6-2
Espanyol B	3-0	CD Ferriolense	Agg:3-1

- 2nd Eliminatory:

June 18, 2006 Home Matches:
Espanyol B	3-1	Villarreal B

June 25, 2006 Away Match:
Villarreal B	1-1	Espanyol B	Agg:2-4

  - Promoted to Segunda División B:Espanyol B

== Groups D ==
- Teams of Eastern Andalusia, Western Andalusia, Extremadura and Castile-La Mancha.

Teams - Group 9 (Eastern Andalusia)	Pts
Granada	78
Granada Atletico	78
Motril	77
Arenas de Armilla	76
Santa Fe	41
Ubeda	16
Basto de Melilla	9

Teams - Group 10 (Western Andalusia)	Pts
Portuense	77
San Fernando	75
Arcos	63
Linense	63
Dos Hermanas	40
Coria	34
Bollullos	30

Teams - Group 14(Extremadura)	Pts
Villanovense	90
Cerro Reyes	88
Don Benito	82
Sporting Villanueva	81
CP Amanecer	39
Alburquerque	39
CD Santa Marta	37
Valdivia	31

Teams - Group 17 (Castile-La Mancha)	Pts
Puertollano	94
Guadalajara	88
Toledo	74
Alcazar	68
Quintanar Orden	34
Villacañas	28
Daimiel	26

=== Group D1 ===
- 1st Eliminatory:

June 4, 2006 Home Matches:
Alcázar	1-0	CF Villanovense
Motril CF	1-0	CD San Fernando

June 11, 2006 Away Matches:
CF Villanovense	4-0	Alcázar	Agg:4-1
CD San Fernando	1-0	Motril CF	Agg:1-1 // Pen:2-4

- 2nd Eliminatory:

June 18, 2006 Home Matches:
Motril CF	0-0	CF Villanovense

June 25, 2006 Away Match:
CF Villanovense	3-0	Motril CF	Agg:3-0

  - Promoted to Segunda División B:CF Villanovense

=== Group D2 ===
- 1st Eliminatory:

June 4, 2006 Home Matches:
CD Toledo	3-2	Cerro Reyes
Arenas CD	1-1	Portuense

June 11, 2006 Away Matches:
Cerro Reyes	0-2	CD Toledo	Agg:2-5
Portuense	2-1	Arenas CD	Agg:3-2

- 2nd Eliminatory:

June 18, 2006 Home Matches:
CD Toledo	0-1	Portuense

June 25, 2006 Away Match:
Portuense	1-0	CD Toledo	Agg:2-0

  - Promoted to Segunda División B:Portuense

=== Group D3 ===
- 1st Eliminatory:

June 4, 2006 Home Matches:
RB Linense	1-0	Granada CF
CD Don Benito	1-0	CD Guadalajara

June 11, 2006 Away Matches:
Granada CF	1-0	RB Linense	Agg:1-1 // Pen:3-0
CD Guadalajara	2-0	CD Don Benito	Agg:2-1

- 2nd Eliminatory:

June 18, 2006 Home Matches:
CD Guadalajara	1-0	Granada CF

June 25, 2006 Away Match:
Granada CF	3-0	CD Guadalajara	Agg:3-1

  - Promoted to Segunda División B:Granada CF

=== Group D4 ===
- 1st Eliminatory:

June 4, 2006 Home Matches:
Sporting Villanueva	0-0	UD Puertollano
Arcos CF	2-0	Granada Atlético CF

June 11, 2006 Away Matches:
UD Puertollano	2-0	Sporting Villanueva	Agg:2-0
Granada Atlético CF	0-0	Arcos CF	Agg:0-2

- 2nd Eliminatory:

June 18, 2006 Home Matches:
Arcos CF	1-2	UD Puertollano

June 25, 2006 Away Match:
UD Puertollano	1-0	Arcos CF	Agg:3-1

  - Promoted to Segunda División B:UD Puertollano

== Group E ==
- Teams of Canary Islands.

Teams - Group 12 (Canary Islands)	Pts
Fuerteventura	75
Laguna	72
O. Maritima	68
Granadilla	66
Maspalomas	42
Mensajero	36
Universidad de Las Palmas B	33

=== Group E ===
- 1st Eliminatory:

June 4, 2006 Home Matches:
CD Orientación Marítima	3-0	AD Laguna
Atlético Granadilla	1-1	UD Fuerteventura

June 11, 2006 Away Matches:
AD Laguna	1-2	CD Orientación Marítima	Agg:1-5
UD Fuerteventura	2-2	Atlético Granadilla	Agg:3-3

- 2nd Eliminatory:

June 18, 2006 Home Matches:
Atlético Granadilla	2-1	CD Orientación Marítima

June 25, 2006 Away Match:
CD Orientación Marítima	3-1	Atlético Granadilla	Agg:4-3

  - Promoted to Segunda División B:CD Orientación Marítima
