= 2001–02 Segunda División B =

Segunda División B
- Season: 2001–02
- Promoted: Terrassa; Compostela; Getafe; Almería
- Relegated: Sporting de Gijón B Oviedo B Caudal; Universidad de Oviedo; Real Sociedad B Eibar B Huesca; Alfaro; Benidorm; Vecindario; Onda; Mensajero; Linense; Dos Hermanas; San Fernando; Coria; Granada; Beasain
- Top goalscorer: Haruna Babangida (23 goals)
- Best goalkeeper: Urko Macías (0.52 goals)
- Biggest home win: Atlético Madrid B 8–0 Universidad de Las Palmas (12 October 2001)
- Biggest away win: Mensajero 0–6 Hércules (2 March 2002)
- Highest scoring: Logroñés 8–1 Beasain (16 December 2001)

The 2001–02 season of Segunda División B of Spanish football started August 2001 and ended May 2002.

== Summary before the 2001–02 season ==
Playoffs de Ascenso:

- Atlético Madrid B
- Ourense
- Zamora
- Toledo
- Burgos (P)
- Cultural Leonesa
- Calahorra
- Amurrio
- Gramenet
- Gimnàstic de Tarragona (P)
- Sabadell
- Espanyol B
- Cádiz
- Ejido (P)
- Xerez (P)
- Ceuta

Relegated from Segunda División:

- Compostela
- Universidad de Las Palmas
- Getafe
- Lleida

Promoted from Tercera División:

- Celta de Vigo B (from Group 1)
- Marino de Luanco (from Group 2)
- Oviedo B (from Group 2)
- Real Sociedad B (from Group 4)
- Alicante (from Group 6)
- Valencia B (from Group 6)
- Onda (from Group 6)
- RSD Alcalá (from Group 7)
- Sevilla B (from Group 10)
- Betis B (from Group 10)
- Lanzarote (from Group 12)
- Ciudad de Murcia (from Group 13)
- Díter Zafra (from Group 14)
- UD Mérida Promesas (from Group 14)
- Logroñés (from Group 15)
- Alfaro (from Group 15)
- Huesca (from Group 16)

Relegated:

- Siero
- San Sebastián de los Reyes
- Ávila
- Deportivo La Coruña B
- Racing de Santander B
- Peña Sport
- Tropezón
- Chantrea
- Burriana
- Alzira
- Gandía
- Premià
- Guadix
- Linares
- Don Benito
- Polideportivo Almería
- Fuenlabrada

== Group I ==
Teams from Álava (Basque Country), Asturias, Biscay (Basque Country), Cantabria, Castile and León and Galicia.

=== Teams ===
Location of teams in Segunda División B Gr. 2 2001–02

Team	Founded	Home city	Stadium
Alavés B	1960	Vitoria, Basque Country	José Luis Compañón
Amurrio	1949	Amurrio, Basque Country	Basarte
Athletic Bilbao B	1964	Bilbao, Basque Country	Lezama
Aurrerá Vitoria	1935	Vitoria, Basque Country	Olanrabe
Barakaldo	1917	Barakaldo, Basque Country	Ciudad Deportiva de San Vicente
Caudal	1918	Mieres, Asturias	Hermanos Antuña
Celta de Vigo B	1927	Vigo, Galicia	Barreiro
Compostela	1962	Santiago de Compostela, Galicia	San Lázaro
Cultural Leonesa	1923	León, Castile and León	Reino de León
Gernika	1922	Gernika, Basque Country	Urbieta
Gimnástica Torrelavega	1907	Torrelavega, Cantabria	El Malecón
Lugo	1953	Lugo, Galicia	Anxo Carro
Marino de Luanco	1931	Luanco, Asturias	Miramar
Ourense	1952	Ourense, Galicia	O Couto
Oviedo B	1940	Oviedo, Asturias	El Requexón
Ponferradina	1922	Ponferrada, Castile and León	El Toralín
Pontevedra	1941	Pontevedra, Galicia	Pasarón
Sporting Gijón B	1960	Gijón, Asturias	Mareo
Universidad de Oviedo	1961	Oviedo, Asturias	San Gregorio
Zamora	1968	Zamora, Castile and León	La Vaguada

=== League table ===
Pos	Team	Pld	W	D	L	GF	GA	GD	Pts
1	Barakaldo CF	38	23	10	5	61	19	+42	79
2	Cultural Leonesa	38	18	13	7	64	43	+21	67
3	SD Compostela	38	17	13	8	53	30	+23	64
4	Pontevedra CF	38	17	12	9	41	30	+11	63
5	Marino de Luanco	38	16	11	11	54	46	+8	59
6	Athletic Bilbao B	38	14	14	10	47	34	+13	56
7	Amurrio Club	38	13	16	9	46	34	+12	55
8	CD Aurrerá de Vitoria	38	12	18	8	38	33	+5	54
9	CD Lugo	38	13	15	10	38	41	−3	54
10	Deportivo Alavés B	38	13	13	12	44	39	+5	52
11	CD Ourense	38	15	5	18	55	61	−6	50
12	SD Gernika Club	38	12	13	13	34	42	−8	49
13	Celta de Vigo B	38	13	10	15	28	38	−10	49
14	SD Ponferradina	38	12	13	13	44	43	+1	49
15	Zamora CF	38	13	9	16	60	60	0	48
16	Gimnástica Torrelavega	38	9	15	14	38	50	−12	42
17	Sporting de Gijón B (R)	38	11	8	19	41	56	−15	41
18	Real Oviedo B (R)	38	9	9	20	25	49	−24	36
19	Caudal Deportivo (R)	38	5	13	20	33	58	−25	28
20	AD Universidad de Oviedo (R)	38	6	8	24	36	74	−38	26

Source: BDFutbol
(R) Relegated

=== Results ===
Home \ Away	ALV	AMU	ATH	AUR	BAR	CAU	CEL	COM	CUL	GER	GIM	LUG	MAR	OUR	OVI	PNF	PNT	SPG	UOV	ZAM
Alavés B	—	0–0	0–1	0–0	0–0	1–0	1–1	3–1	0–0	2–1	5–0	5–0	1–0	3–2	3–0	0–0	2–3	0–1	0–0	0–1
Amurrio	1–1	—	3–1	0–0	0–1	3–1	1–0	2–1	1–1	1–0	0–0	0–0	4–1	5–0	0–0	4–1	0–2	3–4	3–0	2–2
Athletic Bilbao B	1–0	1–0	—	0–0	0–0	0–0	0–0	1–2	1–2	2–1	4–3	1–0	1–1	5–0	6–0	0–0	1–0	0–1	5–1	4–2
Aurrerá Vitoria	1–1	0–0	0–0	—	1–2	0–0	0–0	1–1	1–0	0–0	0–0	2–0	0–0	2–2	4–2	2–1	0–1	4–1	2–1	1–1
Barakaldo	3–0	1–0	5–0	5–0	—	2–1	3–0	1–1	1–1	3–0	2–0	1–0	1–0	3–0	0–0	0–0	0–1	2–0	5–1	3–0
Caudal	0–1	3–0	1–1	0–2	1–3	—	1–2	0–0	2–0	1–2	3–3	0–0	1–3	2–3	0–2	0–0	2–1	1–0	2–2	1–2
Celta B	3–1	0–2	2–1	1–1	1–1	2–1	—	1–1	0–2	0–1	2–0	0–0	1–3	0–0	1–0	1–0	2–0	2–0	1–0	1–2
Compostela	3–1	2–0	1–1	2–0	4–2	3–0	0–0	—	0–1	3–0	0–0	0–0	5–1	1–0	1–0	3–1	0–0	2–0	0–2	1–1
Cultural Leonesa	1–1	2–1	2–0	2–1	1–1	2–1	1–0	4–1	—	0–1	4–2	4–3	4–0	1–1	1–1	5–3	3–0	2–1	3–0	4–2
Gernika	1–1	1–1	1–1	0–1	0–0	1–1	1–0	0–2	1–0	—	1–0	2–1	1–3	1–1	0–2	0–1	1–1	1–1	1–0	1–0
Gim. Torrelavega	1–1	1–2	0–0	1–1	0–1	2–2	3–0	1–1	1–1	1–1	—	0–1	1–4	1–3	0–0	1–0	1–1	0–0	3–1	2–0
Lugo	0–2	0–0	0–0	2–2	1–1	1–0	0–1	1–0	3–1	2–2	2–0	—	0–0	3–2	2–0	1–1	0–0	1–0	1–0	2–1
Marino	2–1	0–0	1–1	1–0	0–1	4–1	3–0	0–2	2–2	2–0	1–2	1–1	—	2–1	1–0	3–2	1–2	0–0	3–0	2–0
Ourense	5–2	0–1	1–0	1–3	0–1	1–0	1–0	2–1	4–2	2–1	0–1	1–2	0–1	—	1–0	3–1	0–2	3–1	4–2	1–1
Oviedo B	0–1	2–0	0–0	0–1	1–0	1–1	1–1	1–0	0–0	1–2	1–0	0–1	0–0	0–3	—	0–1	2–0	1–4	0–1	4–2
Ponferradina	0–2	1–1	0–1	0–0	2–1	5–1	0–1	0–0	1–2	0–0	3–1	4–1	3–1	3–1	2–1	—	0–0	2–1	1–1	1–1
Pontevedra	4–0	0–1	1–0	1–0	1–0	0–0	1–0	0–0	1–1	0–1	0–0	0–1	2–2	2–1	2–1	1–1	—	2–3	1–0	3–2
Sporting B	1–1	0–0	2–1	0–2	1–2	0–1	0–1	0–3	1–1	3–0	0–2	5–3	0–0	0–3	0–1	1–0	0–3	—	4–1	3–2
Univ. Oviedo	0–1	2–2	1–3	0–1	0–1	1–1	3–0	0–2	3–1	0–4	0–1	1–1	2–3	3–2	2–0	1–2	1–1	1–1	—	0–4
Zamora	1–0	2–2	0–2	4–2	0–2	2–0	2–0	2–3	0–0	2–2	2–3	1–1	3–2	2–0	5–0	0–1	0–1	2–1	4–2	—

Source: BDFutbol
Legend: Blue = home team win; Yellow = draw; Red = away team win.

=== Top goalscorers ===
Goalscorers	Goals	Team
(Spain) Juan Carlos Quero	18	Zamora CF
(Spain) Quico	17	CD Ourense
(Spain) Sendoa Agirre	15	Barakaldo CF
(Spain) Joseba Arriaga	15	Athletic Bilbao B
(Spain) Diego Gómez	14	Zamora CF

== Group II ==
Teams from Aragon, Gipuzkoa (Basque Country), Catalonia, La Rioja and Navarre.

=== Teams ===
Location of teams in Segunda División B Gr. 2 2001–02

Team	Founded	Home city	Stadium
Alfaro	1922	Alfaro, La Rioja	La Molineta
Barcelona B	1970	Barcelona, Catalonia	Mini Estadi
SD Beasaín	1905	Beasain, Basque Country	Loinaz
Binéfar	1922	Binéfar, Aragon	Los Olmos
Calahorra	1946	Calahorra, La Rioja	La Planilla
Eibar B	1994	Eibar, Basque Country	Unbe
Espanyol B	1981	Sant Adrià de Besòs, Catalonia	Ciutat Esportiva RCD Espanyol
Figueres	1919	Figueres, Catalonia	Vilatenim
Gramenet	1994	Santa Coloma de Gramenet, Catalonia	Nou Camp Municipal
L'Hospitalet	1957	L'Hospitalet de Llobregat, Catalonia	La Feixa Llarga
Huesca	1960	Huesca, Aragon	El Alcoraz
Lleida	1947	Lleida, Catalonia	Camp d'Esports
Logroñés	1940	Logroño, La Rioja	Las Gaunas
Mataró	1912	Mataró, Catalonia	Camp del Centenari
Osasuna B	1962	Aranguren, Navarre	Tajonar
Real Sociedad B	1951	Usurbil, Basque Country	Zubieta
Real Unión	1915	Irún, Basque Country	Stadium Gal
Sabadell	1903	Sabadell, Catalonia	Nova Creu Alta
Terrassa	1906	Terrassa, Catalonia	Olímpic de Terrassa
Zaragoza B	1958	Zaragoza, Aragon	Ciudad Deportiva del Real Zaragoza

=== League Table ===
Pos	Team	Pld	W	D	L	GF	GA	GD	Pts
1	FC Barcelona B	38	21	8	9	73	41	+32	71
2	RCD Espanyol B	38	19	10	9	63	39	+24	67
3	Real Zaragoza B	38	19	10	9	54	33	+21	67
4	CD Hospitalet	38	19	8	11	66	34	+32	65
5	Terrassa FC	38	18	9	11	51	36	+15	63
6	Real Unión	38	17	8	13	40	37	+3	59
7	UDA Gramenet	38	17	8	13	47	47	0	59
8	CE Mataró	38	16	10	12	60	48	+12	58
9	UE Lleida	38	16	8	14	56	55	+1	56
10	CD Logroñés	38	14	12	12	54	45	+9	54
11	CA Osasuna B	38	12	12	14	39	37	+2	48
12	CD Calahorra	38	13	9	16	44	50	−6	48
13	UE Figueres	38	13	8	17	40	42	−2	47
14	CE Sabadell FC	38	13	7	18	47	57	−10	46
15	CD Binéfar	38	12	9	17	39	53	−14	45
16	SD Beasaín	38	11	11	16	43	61	−18	44
17	Real Sociedad B (R)	38	11	9	18	38	57	−19	42
18	SD Éibar B (R)	38	9	11	18	29	48	−19	38
19	SD Huesca (R)	38	10	5	23	37	58	−21	35
20	CD Alfaro (R)	38	7	14	17	33	75	−42	35

Source: BDFutbol
(R) Relegated

=== Results ===
Home \ Away	ALF	BAR	BEA	BIN	CAL	EIB	ESP	FIG	GRA	HOS	HUE	LLE	LOG	MAT	OSA	RSB	RUN	SAB	TER	ZAR
Alfaro	—	1–2	3–1	1–0	0–0	1–1	1–1	0–3	0–1	1–0	1–1	0–4	0–0	3–2	0–3	4–2	2–0	2–0	2–3	1–1
Barcelona B	2–0	—	3–2	1–1	1–2	1–0	0–1	2–0	5–1	1–1	1–0	3–1	3–0	1–1	4–2	2–0	2–2	3–0	2–0	4–1
Beasaín	3–0	1–1	—	2–0	2–0	1–0	1–2	0–4	1–1	0–1	2–1	0–1	0–0	1–0	1–2	1–1	2–1	4–0	1–0	1–4
Binéfar	1–1	1–4	1–3	—	3–1	0–0	1–0	1–2	1–3	1–0	3–1	0–2	1–0	1–0	0–1	2–0	1–1	1–0	0–0	0–1
Calahorra	1–1	3–1	0–0	1–0	—	5–0	1–0	3–1	1–1	0–0	1–0	3–1	3–2	3–1	0–1	0–0	1–0	0–1	0–2	2–2
Eibar B	0–0	1–1	2–0	0–1	2–0	—	0–1	2–1	0–1	2–1	2–1	0–1	2–0	1–1	0–0	2–0	0–0	2–2	1–1	1–1
Espanyol B	6–0	0–2	4–0	1–0	2–0	3–0	—	1–1	1–0	3–3	1–1	0–2	4–4	3–2	1–0	0–0	3–1	6–1	2–0	1–2
Figueres	1–1	1–1	3–0	2–1	4–2	0–2	1–1	—	1–2	0–2	2–1	2–0	0–2	0–2	2–0	1–0	0–1	0–3	0–1	0–0
Gramenet	2–0	1–3	3–0	3–0	0–1	1–0	1–0	0–0	—	2–5	1–0	2–0	0–2	3–1	0–0	2–0	0–0	2–0	3–0	3–0
L'Hospitalet	7–0	2–1	2–0	5–2	4–0	2–0	2–0	1–0	2–1	—	3–0	1–1	4–2	1–1	2–0	5–0	1–0	3–1	1–1	1–1
Huesca	4–1	0–3	0–3	0–0	4–1	2–0	0–0	1–2	3–0	1–0	—	3–2	0–1	0–1	1–0	1–0	3–0	0–0	1–0	0–2
Lleida	3–0	3–0	3–3	3–2	2–1	3–1	2–3	2–1	0–0	1–1	4–1	—	5–2	0–5	1–1	1–1	0–0	2–1	1–0	0–2
Logroñés	1–1	0–1	8–1	2–2	3–1	0–0	1–0	1–0	1–2	1–0	2–1	2–2	—	1–1	2–2	4–0	2–1	3–1	0–2	0–1
Mataró	0–0	1–0	2–2	2–2	3–2	2–0	3–1	2–1	6–1	1–0	4–1	2–1	0–0	—	2–1	1–1	1–2	0–1	0–2	1–2
Osasuna B	0–0	3–1	0–0	1–2	0–0	3–0	1–1	0–1	4–0	1–0	3–1	1–0	1–3	1–2	—	0–1	0–1	1–1	2–1	0–0
R. Sociedad B	6–1	0–5	0–0	1–1	1–4	1–0	1–3	3–2	2–2	2–0	3–0	1–0	1–0	2–3	0–1	—	2–0	2–0	1–0	1–2
Real Unión	2–0	3–2	2–0	3–1	1–0	1–3	1–1	0–0	1–0	2–0	2–1	2–0	1–0	1–2	1–0	1–0	—	3–1	2–0	1–1
Sabadell	5–1	2–2	5–3	2–3	0–0	1–0	0–1	1–0	1–0	2–1	2–1	1–2	0–1	1–1	2–2	3–0	2–0	—	0–1	1–2
Terrassa	2–2	3–1	1–1	3–0	4–2	3–1	1–2	0–0	4–1	2–1	2–0	2–0	1–1	3–1	1–1	2–2	1–0	1–0	—	1–0
Zaragoza B	4–1	0–1	0–0	0–2	2–0	3–0	2–3	0–1	1–1	0–1	3–1	5–0	0–0	2–0	2–0	1–0	2–0	1–3	1–0	—

Source: BDFutbol
Legend: Blue = home team win; Yellow = draw; Red = away team win.

=== Top goalscorers ===
Goalscorers	Goals	Team
(Nigeria) Haruna Babangida	23	FC Barcelona B
(Spain) David Prats Racero	23	CE Mataró
(Spain) Keko	19	Terrassa FC
(Spain) Rubén Alvero	17	CD Alfaro
(Spain) Víctor Morales	16	CD Logroñés

== Group III ==
Teams from Canary Islands, Castilla–La Mancha, Community of Madrid and Valencian Community

=== Teams ===
Location of teams in Segunda División B Gr. 3 2001–02
Canary Islands

Team	Founded	Home city	Stadium
RSD Alcalá	1929	Alcalá, Madrid	El Val
Alcorcón	1971	Alcorcón, Madrid	Santo Domingo
Alicante	1918	Alicante, Valencian Community	José Rico Pérez
Atlético de Madrid B	1960	Majadahonda, Madrid	Cerro del Espino
Benidorm	1964	Benidorm, Valencian Community	Foietes
Castellón	1922	Castellón de la Plana, Valencian Community	Nou Castàlia
Conquense	1946	Cuenca, Castilla–La Mancha	La Fuensanta
Getafe	1983	Getafe, Community of Madrid	Coliseum Alfonso Pérez
Hércules	1922	Alicante, Valencian Community	José Rico Pérez
Lanzarote	1970	Arrecife, Canary Islands	Ciudad Deportiva de Lanzarote
Mensajero	1924	Santa Cruz de La Palma, Canary Islands	Silvestre Carrillo
Novelda	1925	Novelda, Valencian Community	La Magdalena
Onda	1921	Onda, Valencian Community	La Serratella
Pájara Playas de Jandía	1996	Pájara, Canary Islands	Benito Alonso
Real Madrid B	1930	Madrid, Madrid	Ciudad Deportiva
Talavera	1948	Talavera de la Reina, Castilla–La Mancha	El Prado
Toledo	1928	Toledo, Castilla–La Mancha	Salto del Caballo
Universidad Las Palmas	1994	Las Palmas, Canary Islands	Pepe Gonçalvez
Valencia B	1944	Valencia, Valencian Community	Ciudad Deportiva de Paterna
Vecindario	1962	Vecindario, Canary Islands	Municipal de Vecindario

=== League Table ===
Pos	Team	Pld	W	D	L	GF	GA	GD	Pts
1	Real Madrid B	38	24	8	6	63	31	+32	80
2	Valencia CF B	38	20	9	9	55	27	+28	69
3	Hércules CF	38	17	13	8	65	37	+28	64
4	Universidad de Las Palmas (Note: Reserve team of UD Las Palmas)	38	18	9	11	57	43	+14	63
5	Getafe CF	38	17	10	11	48	37	+11	61
6	Alicante CF	38	17	10	11	62	50	+12	61
7	Novelda CF	38	17	6	15	47	43	+4	57
8	UD Lanzarote	38	16	9	13	50	47	+3	57
9	CD Toledo	38	14	13	11	42	30	+12	55
10	Atlético Madrid B	38	15	10	13	53	41	+12	55
11	RSD Alcalá	38	12	16	10	43	44	−1	52
12	UB Conquense	38	13	12	13	43	47	−4	51
13	CD Castellón	38	11	13	14	38	46	−8	46
14	UD Pájara Playas de Jandía	38	13	6	19	41	51	−10	45
15	Talavera CF	38	9	16	13	34	47	−13	43
16	AD Alcorcón	38	10	11	17	35	53	−18	41
17	Benidorm CD	38	9	12	17	36	53	−17	39
18	UD Vecindario	38	8	12	18	38	57	−19	36
19	CD Onda	38	10	6	22	44	73	−29	36
20	CD Mensajero	38	6	7	25	30	67	−37	25

Source: BDFutbol

=== Results ===
Home \ Away	ALCL	ALCR	ALI	ATL	BEN	CAS	CON	GET	HÉR	LAN	MEN	NOV	OND	PAJ	RMB	TAL	TOL	ULP	VAL	VEC
Alcalá	—	2–1	0–0	1–0	0–1	2–0	1–2	3–2	1–1	0–0	3–1	2–2	0–0	0–0	1–1	0–0	1–1	0–4	1–2	2–0
Alcorcón	1–2	—	1–4	0–1	0–0	2–1	1–2	1–1	0–2	1–1	0–0	1–0	0–3	1–0	0–1	3–2	0–2	0–0	3–0	1–0
Alicante	2–3	5–2	—	0–2	0–0	1–0	3–0	2–1	2–2	6–0	1–0	2–0	2–1	1–1	1–1	1–1	1–0	2–1	1–3	5–1
Atlético Madrid B	0–0	0–1	2–4	—	0–2	0–1	1–0	0–0	1–0	0–0	3–1	4–0	2–2	1–3	2–1	4–1	2–1	8–0	0–0	0–0
Benidorm	2–2	0–1	2–0	1–2	—	1–1	2–2	0–2	0–3	0–1	3–0	0–1	2–1	1–0	1–2	0–0	0–4	0–3	1–1	1–1
Castellón	0–1	0–0	2–0	2–2	2–0	—	3–1	2–0	3–2	3–1	2–1	0–5	2–2	0–0	0–0	1–2	1–2	3–0	1–1	0–0
Conquense	1–3	1–1	2–3	3–1	2–2	3–1	—	0–1	0–1	3–1	1–1	1–1	0–0	0–1	0–2	1–1	2–0	2–2	1–0	1–1
Getafe	0–0	0–0	2–0	2–3	1–2	3–2	1–1	—	2–2	0–1	0–1	1–0	1–0	2–0	3–2	1–0	3–1	1–0	1–0	1–1
Hércules	5–1	0–0	2–2	1–0	3–2	0–0	4–0	2–3	—	2–0	2–1	0–1	2–0	1–0	0–0	3–1	1–1	1–1	0–0	5–0
Lanzarote	1–3	3–0	4–1	1–0	2–1	1–0	0–1	0–0	2–1	—	3–0	0–1	4–2	3–0	1–2	2–2	1–2	2–2	4–2	0–0
Mensajero	1–1	1–3	0–1	0–0	0–1	1–3	1–0	3–1	0–6	1–2	—	3–0	2–3	1–0	1–2	0–1	1–0	2–4	0–1	1–4
Novelda	2–1	2–1	2–0	3–0	2–1	0–0	0–1	0–1	2–2	1–0	3–1	—	4–0	0–0	1–2	0–1	1–0	1–2	1–0	3–1
Onda	0–2	1–1	1–4	1–6	1–1	1–2	1–3	0–3	2–3	1–0	2–1	2–1	—	2–0	0–2	3–2	2–0	1–2	0–3	3–1
Pájara Playas	2–2	2–1	3–2	1–2	3–0	1–0	0–1	1–3	1–0	1–2	2–1	4–0	3–2	—	1–2	2–0	1–0	0–1	0–1	2–3
Real Madrid B	2–0	3–1	0–1	2–0	4–2	4–0	0–0	2–3	2–2	2–2	1–0	1–0	2–1	1–0	—	4–0	2–0	2–0	0–2	2–1
Talavera	1–0	2–1	1–1	0–0	1–3	0–0	0–2	2–2	0–0	1–1	1–1	1–2	1–0	2–2	1–2	—	1–1	1–0	0–0	2–0
Toledo	1–1	1–1	0–0	2–0	1–1	0–0	1–0	1–0	2–1	3–0	2–0	2–1	3–0	5–0	0–2	0–0	—	0–1	0–0	2–1
Universidad LPGC	1–1	3–0	5–0	1–2	2–0	0–0	4–0	1–0	1–2	0–2	1–1	0–0	2–3	2–1	2–1	2–0	0–0	—	0–2	2–0
Valencia B	3–0	3–1	0–0	2–1	2–0	3–0	0–2	1–0	3–0	0–2	4–0	3–1	1–0	3–0	0–0	0–1	1–1	2–3	—	3–1
Vecindario	1–0	2–3	2–1	1–1	0–0	3–0	1–1	0–0	0–1	2–0	0–0	2–3	3–0	2–3	1–2	2–1	0–0	0–2	0–3	—

Source: BDFutbol
Legend: Blue = home team win; Yellow = draw; Red = away team win.

=== Top goalscorers ===
Goalscorers	Goals	Team
(Spain) Luis García	15	Real Madrid B
(Spain) Javier Portillo	15	Real Madrid B
(Spain) Jonathan Torres	15	UD Lanzarote
(Spain) Vicente Borge	14	Hércules CF
(Spain) Pedro Vega	14	Universidad de Las Palmas CF

== Group IV ==
Teams from Andalusia, Balearic Islands, Ceuta, Extremadura, Melilla and Region of Murcia.

=== Teams ===
Location of teams in Segunda División B Gr. 4 2001–02

Team	Founded	Home city	Stadium
Algeciras	1909	Algeciras, Andalusia	Nuevo Mirador
Almería	1989	Almería, Andalusia	Juan Rojas
Real Betis B	1962	Seville, Andalusia	Ciudad Deportiva Ruíz de Lopera
Cádiz	1910	Cádiz, Andalusia	Ramón de Carranza
Cartagonova	1995	Cartagena, Region of Murcia	Cartagonova
Ceuta	1996	Ceuta	Alfonso Murube
Ciudad de Murcia	1999	Murcia, Region of Murcia	La Condomina
Coria	1923	Coria del Río, Andalusia	Guadalquivir
Díter Zafra	1930	Zafra, Extremadura	Nuevo Estadio
Dos Hermanas	1970	Dos Hermanas, Andalusia	Miguel Román García
Écija	1939	Écija, Andalusia	San Pablo
Granada	1931	Granada, Andalusia	Nuevo Los Cármenes
Jerez	1969	Jerez de los Caballeros, Extremadura	Manuel Calzado Galván
Linense	1912	La Línea de la Concepción, Andalusia	Municipal La Línea de la Concepción
Mallorca B	1967	Palma, Balearic Islands	Lluís Sitjar
Melilla	1976	Melilla	Álvarez Claro
Mérida	1990	Mérida, Extremadura	Romano
Motril	1984	Motril, Andalusia	Escribano Castilla
San Fernando	1940	San Fernando, Andalusia	Bahía Sur
Sevilla B	1958	Seville, Andalusia	José Ramón Cisneros Palacios

=== League Table ===
Pos	Team	Pld	W	D	L	GF	GA	GD	Pts
1	Motril CF	38	23	8	7	55	29	+26	77
2	AD Ceuta	38	23	8	7	47	22	+25	77
3	UD Almería	38	22	7	9	56	35	+21	73
4	UD Mérida	38	17	13	8	42	30	+12	64
5	Ciudad de Murcia	38	18	6	14	39	38	+1	60
6	Jerez CF	38	13	16	9	46	36	+10	55
7	Cádiz CF	38	14	12	12	38	33	+5	54
8	Real Betis B	38	12	17	9	38	40	−2	53
9	Écija Balompié	38	13	12	13	33	32	+1	51
10	Granada CF (R)	38	14	8	16	40	45	−5	50
11	Sevilla FC B	38	10	15	13	29	30	−1	45
12	Cartagonova FC	38	10	14	14	30	47	−17	44
13	Algeciras CF	38	10	14	14	26	33	−7	44
14	CD Díter Zafra	38	10	14	14	35	42	−7	44
15	RCD Mallorca B	38	11	10	17	44	45	−1	43
16	UD Melilla	38	10	13	15	35	39	−4	43
17	RB Linense (R)	38	10	12	16	29	36	−7	42
18	Dos Hermanas CF (R)	38	9	13	16	34	38	−4	40
19	CD San Fernando (R)	38	8	11	19	34	51	−17	35
20	Coria CF (R)	38	7	9	22	27	56	−29	30

Source: BDFutbol
(R) Relegated

=== Results ===
Home \ Away	ALG	ALM	BET	CAD	CAR	CEU	CIU	COR	DZA	DHE	ECI	GRA	JER	LIN	MAL	MEL	MER	MOT	SAF	SEV
Algeciras	—	1–2	2–1	0–2	1–1	0–1	1–0	3–1	2–0	1–1	2–1	3–2	0–0	1–0	1–2	0–1	0–1	1–0	1–0	0–0
Almería	2–0	—	0–0	2–2	3–0	1–0	1–2	5–1	2–0	1–0	2–1	3–2	0–0	0–0	2–2	3–0	1–2	3–1	1–2	1–0
Betis B	1–1	2–1	—	2–1	0–0	2–1	0–0	1–0	2–2	1–2	2–1	0–0	1–1	0–0	2–1	1–1	3–0	1–1	0–1	0–1
Cádiz	0–0	1–2	2–3	—	3–0	1–0	0–1	2–0	0–0	0–1	0–1	0–0	1–2	3–0	1–0	0–1	2–2	0–0	1–0	2–1
Cartagonova	2–1	2–3	2–1	0–0	—	1–2	1–0	2–1	1–0	2–1	1–1	1–1	0–1	1–0	0–1	2–2	0–0	0–0	1–0	0–0
Ceuta	2–0	2–0	3–0	0–1	1–1	—	1–0	2–0	3–0	2–0	1–0	1–0	1–1	1–0	2–1	2–2	0–1	0–2	1–0	0–1
Ciudad de Murcia	0–0	2–1	1–0	0–0	2–0	0–1	—	2–0	2–1	1–0	2–1	1–0	1–2	3–1	1–0	1–1	0–1	3–0	1–0	1–0
Coria	1–0	0–1	1–1	1–2	1–1	0–2	3–0	—	1–0	0–0	0–2	1–3	1–0	0–0	2–0	0–0	0–4	1–3	0–1	1–1
Díter Zafra	2–0	0–1	1–2	0–1	2–2	1–1	4–0	3–1	—	1–0	1–0	0–2	1–1	2–1	0–0	1–1	0–0	1–0	1–1	0–0
Dos Hermanas	0–0	2–3	1–2	1–1	2–0	0–1	0–2	2–3	1–1	—	0–0	1–2	1–1	0–1	1–3	3–0	0–0	1–0	0–0	1–1
Écija	0–0	0–0	0–0	2–1	3–0	1–1	1–0	1–1	1–2	1–0	—	1–1	1–1	0–1	2–0	1–0	1–2	0–1	1–0	1–1
Granada	2–1	1–0	1–1	1–0	2–0	0–0	1–4	1–2	0–2	0–2	2–1	—	1–2	1–0	0–0	3–2	1–0	1–2	1–1	0–1
Jerez	0–0	2–1	1–1	0–1	2–1	0–1	1–1	1–0	0–1	0–2	4–0	2–0	—	2–1	2–2	3–0	3–3	3–2	0–0	0–0
Linense	0–0	2–2	0–0	0–0	2–0	0–1	2–0	1–0	2–1	1–3	0–1	3–1	1–0	—	0–3	0–0	3–0	0–1	3–2	1–1
Mallorca B	3–0	1–2	0–2	1–3	1–2	2–3	4–0	2–1	2–0	1–2	0–0	1–2	1–1	1–1	—	0–1	0–3	0–0	2–1	0–2
Melilla	0–0	0–1	4–0	0–2	4–0	1–2	3–0	1–1	0–0	0–0	1–2	2–1	1–1	2–1	0–3	—	0–1	0–1	0–0	1–0
Mérida	1–1	0–1	0–0	1–1	1–1	0–0	3–2	1–0	1–1	1–0	0–1	0–1	1–0	1–1	0–2	1–0	—	2–2	3–1	1–0
Motril	1–0	2–0	4–0	5–0	1–0	0–0	2–1	3–0	1–0	3–2	1–0	2–1	2–1	1–0	1–1	1–0	0–2	—	2–0	3–1
San Fernando	0–2	0–1	1–1	1–1	1–1	2–4	1–1	1–0	5–1	1–1	1–1	1–2	1–4	1–0	2–1	1–0	0–2	2–3	—	0–2
Sevilla B	0–0	0–1	1–2	2–0	0–1	0–1	0–1	1–1	2–2	0–0	0–1	1–0	3–1	0–0	0–0	0–3	1–0	1–1	4–2	—

Source: BDFutbol
Legend: Blue = home team win; Yellow = draw; Red = away team win.

=== Top goalscorers ===
Goalscorers	Goals	Team
(Spain) Raúl Sánchez	22	UD Almería
(Spain) Iván Reino	15	Jerez CF
(Spain) Aitor Huegún	14	Motril CF
(Argentina) Adrián Dezotti	13	Granada CF
(Argentina) Rolando Zárate	12	Ciudad de Murcia

== Play-out ==
=== Semifinal ===
Team 1	Agg.	Team 2	1st leg	2nd leg
Melilla	3–1	Beasain	2–0	1–1
Alcorcón	(a) 1–1	Gimnástica de Torrelavega	0–0	1–1

=== Final ===
Team 1	Agg.	Team 2	1st leg	2nd leg
Beasain	2–3	Gimnástica de Torrelavega	0–1	2–2
