= CD Cuenca =

Cuenca
- Full name: Club Deportivo Cuenca
- Founded: 1943; 1970 (refounded)
- Dissolved: 2008
- Ground: La Fuensanta, Cuenca, Castile-La Mancha, Spain
- Capacity: 6,000
- 2007–08: Primera Autonómica Preferente – Group 1, 7th of 18
Home colours

Club Deportivo Cuenca was a Spanish football team based in Cuenca, in the autonomous community of Castile-La Mancha. Founded in 1943 and dissolved in 2008, it last played in Primera Autonómica Preferente – Group 1, and held home matches at Estadio La Fuensanta, with a 6,000-seat capacity.

== History ==
Founded in 1943 after the merger of Cuenca CF and UD La Mancha, CD Cuenca played three seasons before folding, with a group of their supporters opting to create UB Conquense months before their dissolution. In 1970, Agrupación Deportiva San José Obrero was founded, playing in the regional leagues.

In 1994, San José Obrero changed name to Agrupación Deportiva San José-Cuenca, and later to Club Deportivo Cuenca in 1996. The club achieved promotion to Tercera División two years later, and managed to reach the 2001 Tercera División play-offs.

Relegated in 2006, Cuenca was dissolved in 2008.

== Season to season ==
Season	Tier	Division	Place	Copa del Rey
1970–71	7	3ª Reg.	17th	
1971–72	8	3ª Reg.	6th	
1972–73	8	3ª Reg.	2nd	
1973–74	7	3ª Reg. P.	3rd	
1974–75	6	2ª Reg.	19th	
1975–76	7	3ª Reg. P.	1st	
1976–77	6	2ª Reg.	17th	
1977–78	7	2ª Reg.	1st	
1978–79	6	1ª Reg.	6th	
1979–80	6	1ª Reg.	8th	
1980–81	6	1ª Reg.	8th	
1981–82	6	1ª Reg.	4th	
1982–83	6	1ª Reg.	5th	
1983–84	5	Reg. Pref.	17th	
1984–85	6	1ª Reg.	13th	
1985–86	6	1ª Reg.	7th	
1986–87	5	Reg. Pref.	13th	
1987–88	5	Reg. Pref.	15th	
1988–89	5	Reg. Pref.	6th	

Season	Tier	Division	Place	Copa del Rey
1989–90	5	Reg. Pref.	8th	
1990–91	5	Reg. Pref.	7th	
1991–92	5	Reg. Pref.	11th	
1992–93	6	1ª Reg.	2nd	
1993–94	5	Reg. Pref.	10th	
1994–95	5	Reg. Pref.	12th	
1995–96	5	Reg. Pref.	3rd	
1996–97	5	Reg. Pref.	2nd	
1997–98	4	3ª	11th	
1998–99	4	3ª	10th	
1999–2000	4	3ª	8th	
2000–01	4	3ª	4th	
2001–02	4	3ª	15th	
2002–03	4	3ª	6th	
2003–04	4	3ª	13th	
2004–05	4	3ª	14th	
2005–06	4	3ª	16th	
2006–07	5	1ª Aut.	12th	
2007–08	5	1ª Aut.	7th	

- 9 seasons in Tercera División
