= Jonathan Torres (footballer, born 1977) =

Spanish footballer

Personal information
- Full name: Jonathan Jacob Torres Hernández
- Date of birth: 11 December 1977 (age 48)
- Place of birth: Arrecife, Spain
- Height: 1.76 m (5 ft 9 1/2 in)
- Position: Forward

Senior career*
Years	Team	Apps	(Gls)
1996	Tenerife B	5	(0)
1998–1999	Valencia B	28	(2)
1999–2002	Lanzarote		
2002–2003	Tenerife	8	(0)
2003	Universidad LP	14	(8)
2003	Tenerife	6	(0)
2004	Gimnàstic	16	(6)
2004–2005	Las Palmas	33	(7)
2005–2007	Terrassa	53	(14)
2007–2008	Portuense	13	(2)
2008	Orihuela	16	(3)
2008–2009	Lanzarote	32	(8)
2009	Alicante	7	(0)
2010–2011	Lanzarote		
- Teguise
2018	San Bartolomé		
Total		246	(55)
- * Club domestic league appearances and goals

Jonathan Jacob Torres Hernández (born 11 December 1977) is a Spanish former professional footballer who played as a forward.

== Career ==
Torres started his career with Tenerife B and Valencia B between 1996 and 1999, scoring two goals in a total of thirty-three appearances. In 1999, fellow Segunda División B side Lanzarote signed Torres. He scored ten goals in his first season, including a hat-trick over Real Madrid B on 24 October 1999, which ended with relegation. Two years later, in 2002, Torres joined Tenerife of the Segunda División. He made his professional debut on 14 September, featuring for the final six minutes of a home draw with Oviedo. 2003 saw Torres play for Universidad LP, scoring eight goals in twenty fixtures as the club won the title prior to resigning for Tenerife.

In 2004, Gimnàstic completed the signing of Torres. He was part of the club's squad that won promotion to the 2004–05 Segunda División. Soon after, Torres was on the move again after agreeing to sign for Las Palmas. He then had spells with Terrassa, Portuense and Orihuela. Torres scored a total of twenty-seven goals across one hundred and nineteen matches for the aforementioned teams. Torres rejoined Lanzarote in 2008. Ahead of the 2009–10 Segunda División B, Torres agreed to join Alicante. He was sent off on debut, during a Copa del Rey win over Sporting Mahonés. 2010 saw Torres rejoin Lanzarote again, eventually leaving in 2011.

Torres joined regional side San Bartolomé in September 2018, having previously appeared for Teguise.

== Personal life ==
Torres' brother, Santi, was also a footballer, playing alongside Torres at Lanzarote in his first and third spell with the club.

== Career statistics ==
Club statistics
Club	Season	League			Cup (Note: Includes the Copa del Rey)		League Cup		Continental		Other		Total	
Club	Season	Division	Apps	Goals	Apps	Goals	Apps	Goals	Apps	Goals	Apps	Goals	Apps	Goals
Tenerife B	1995–96	Segunda División B	5	0	0	0	—		—		0	0	5	0
Valencia B	1998–99	Segunda División B	28	2	0	0	—		—		0	0	28	2
Lanzarote	1999–2000	Segunda División B	35	10	1	0	—		—		0	0	36	10
Lanzarote	2001–02	Segunda División B	34	15	3	0	—		—		0	0	37	15
Lanzarote	Total		69	25	4	0	—		—		0	0	73	25
Tenerife	2002–03	Segunda División	8	0	0	0	—		—		0	0	8	0
Universidad LP	2002–03	Segunda División B	14	8	0	0	—		—		6 (Note: Six appearances in the 2002–03 Segunda División B play-offs)	0	20	8
Tenerife	2003–04	Segunda División	6	0	0	0	—		—		0	0	6	0
Gimnàstic	2003–04	Segunda División B	16	6	0	0	—		—		6 (Note: Six appearances in the 2003–04 Segunda División B play-offs)	3 (Note: Three goals in the 2003–04 Segunda División B play-offs)	22	9
Las Palmas	2004–05	Segunda División B	33	7	1	0	—		—		0	0	34	7
Terrassa	2005–06	Segunda División B	27	8	1	1	—		—		0	0	28	9
Terrassa	2006–07	Segunda División B	26	6	1	0	—		—		0	0	27	6
Terrassa	Total		53	14	2	1	—		—		0	0	55	15
Portuense	2007–08	Segunda División B	13	2	1	0	—		—		0	0	14	2
Orihuela	2007–08	Segunda División B	16	3	0	0	—		—		0	0	16	3
Lanzarote	2008–09	Segunda División B	32	8	0	0	—		—		0	0	32	8
Alicante	2009–10	Segunda División B	7	0	1	0	—		—		0	0	8	0
Lanzarote	2009–10	Segunda División B	15	5	0	0	—		—		0	0	15	5
Lanzarote	2011–12	Tercera División	6	0	0	0	—		—		0	0	6	0
Career total			321	80	9	1	—		—		12	3	342	84

== Honours ==
Universidad LP

- Segunda División B: 2002–03
