= Nino Lema =

Spanish footballer and coach

Personal information
- Full name: Benigno Lema Mejuto
- Date of birth: 12 September 1964 (age 62)
- Place of birth: Vigo, Spain
- Height: 1.82 m (6 ft 0 in)
- Position: Right-back

Youth career
- 1972–1984: Celta

Senior career*
Years	Team	Apps	(Gls)
1984–1988	Celta	64	(1)
1984–1985	→ Arosa (loan)	29	(0)
1987–1989	Mallorca	3	(0)
1988–1989	→ Tenerife (loan)	35	(1)
1989–1990	Español	29	(0)
1990–1996	Rayo Vallecano	148	(0)
Total		308	(2)

Managerial career
- 1998–1999: Torrellano
- 1999–2002: Santa Pola
- 2004–2006: Ciempozuelos
- 2006–2007: Pego
- 2007: Jove Español
- 2007–2008: Dénia
- 2008: Alicante
- 2009–2012: Dénia
- 2012–2013: Orihuela
- 2013–2014: Ontinyent
- * Club domestic league appearances and goals

Benigno 'Nino' Lema Mejuto (born 12 September 1964) is a Spanish retired football right-back and manager.

== Playing career ==
Born in Vigo, Province of Pontevedra, Lema played since the age of 8 with local giants RC Celta de Vigo. He made his La Liga debut on 31 August 1985 in a 1–1 away draw against Real Sociedad, and finished his debut season with 27 games and one goal as the Galicians suffered relegation with only 14 points; during his contract, he also served a loan in the lower leagues with Arosa SC.

Lema left Celta in June 1987 after winning promotion, and played in both the top tier and the Segunda División for the remainder of his career, representing RCD Mallorca, CD Tenerife, RCD Español and Rayo Vallecano. He totalled 279 matches across both major levels of Spanish football over 11 seasons, and achieved five promotions.

== Coaching career ==
After retiring as a player, Lema settled in Alicante and worked with amateur teams in the Valencian Community, his first appointment being with Torrellano CF. In his beginnings, he also worked as a radio commentator in local matches.

In 2007–08, Lema signed for what would be his main club the following years, CD Dénia, leading it through its first season ever in the Segunda División B and helping to a 12th-place finish. Subsequently, he moved to the professionals with Alicante CF (division two), but would only be in charge of the team for five games as one of four managers during the 2008–09 campaign, which ended in relegation.

Returned to Dénia in summer 2009, Lema led the side to the fifth position in the first year in his second spell, just five points shy of the promotion playoffs. At the end of the 2011–12 season he decided to leave after their relegation, even though permanence was achieved on the pitch.

Lema was appointed at Orihuela CF on 24 October 2012, following the dismissal of Sergio Inclán.
