= Estadio Antonio Solana =

Football stadium

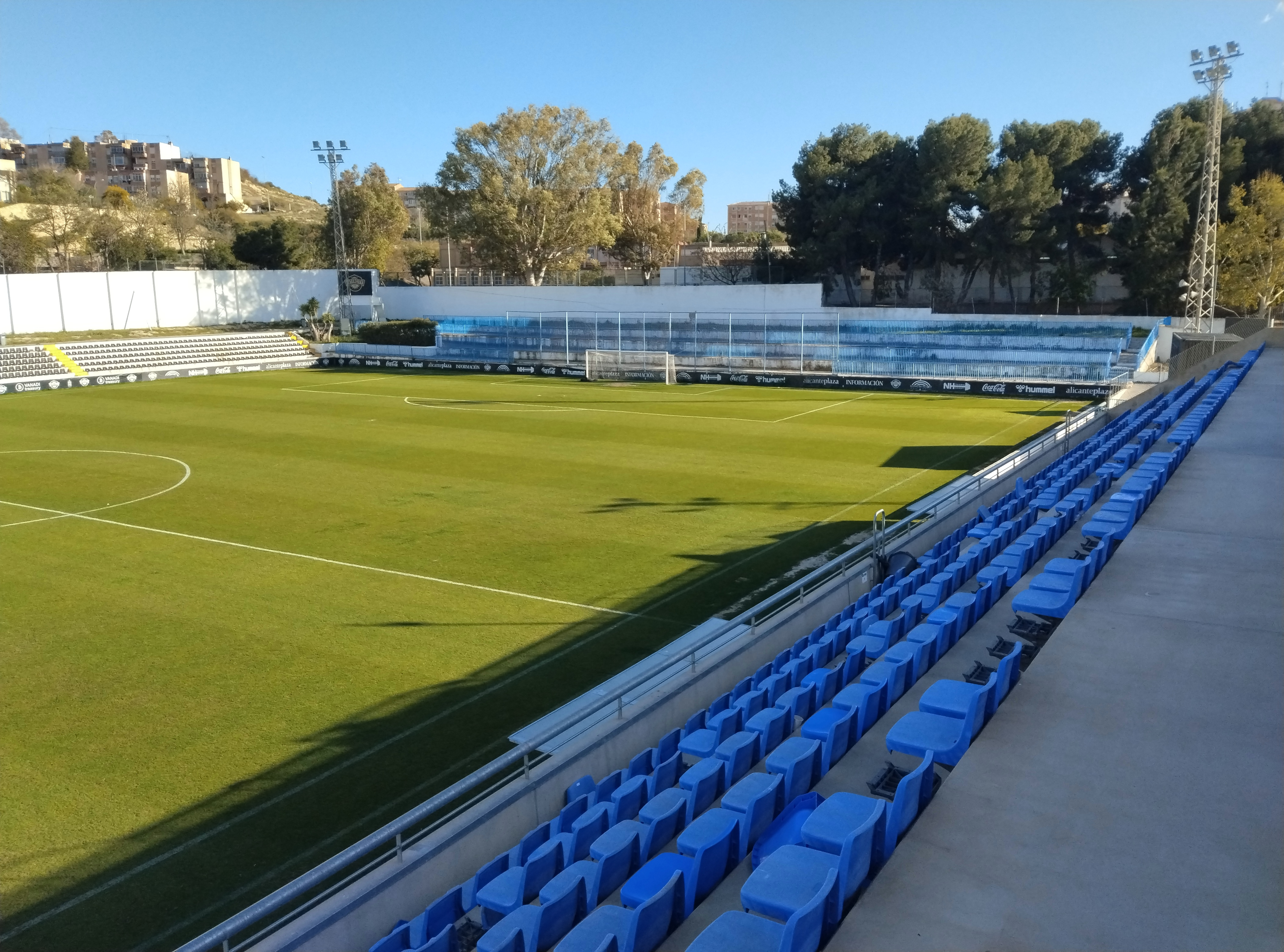
- Interactive map of Estadio Antonio Solana
- Full name: Estadio Antonio Solana
- Address: Alicante, Valencian Community; Spain
- Coordinates: 38.378769°N 0.486660°W
- Owner: Alicante City Council
- Capacity: 2,500
- Surface: Grass
- Field size: 100 × 60 m

Construction
- Built: 1979
- Opened: 12 April 1979
- Renovated: 2013

Tenants
- Alicante CF (1979–2001; 2010–2014); CFI Alicante (2016–present); CF Intercity

Estadio Antonio Solana (also called Estadio Alicante CF on some previous occasions) is a small stadium located on the outskirts of the city of Alicante.

It has two stands, Tribuna and Preferente, with a capacity of 2,500 spectators and hosts the football matches of CF Intercity and CFI Alicante.

== History ==
It was inaugurated on 12 April 1979, during the term of then-president Jaime Bagur (under whose presidency the club achieved promotion to Tercera División, and who was the first president of the club to provide Alicante CF with its own stadium). The stadium was inaugurated with a friendly match against their biggest rival, Hércules CF, a match that ended 2–1 in favor of Alicante CF.

The stadium is located on land donated by the Baños family, where the Villafranqueza Sports City (the site of Estadio Alicante CF) was built, owned by the City Council; however, there was a clause that states that only Alicante CF can use the facilities.

In 2013, the municipal stadium underwent renovations by the City Council, providing it with improved facilities. It also has two adjacent pitches (one for 11-a-side football and another for 8-a-side) where the club's youth teams play their matches. The renovated facilities in Villafranqueza were inaugurated on 9 March 2014, and named the Antonio Solana Sports Complex, after the president of Alicante CF from 1999 to 2006.

In June 2015, the facility closed for several months due to structural problems that posed risks to users. On 29 January 2016, the "Antonio Solana Sports Complex" in Villafranqueza reopened after extensive renovations undertaken by the Alicante City Council due to the poor condition of the facilities. The renovation, which took two and a half months, cost a total of €140,000. On 6 August 2016, a friendly match was held against Hércules CF to celebrate the reopening of the natural grass pitch, as matches had previously been played on the adjacent artificial turf field.
