= CFI Alicante =

Spanish football club

- Full name: Club de Fútbol Independiente Alicante
- Founded: 2014
- Stadium: Estadio Antonio Solana, Alicante, Valencian Community, Spain
- Capacity: 2,500
- President: Antonio García
- Coach: Edu Pastor
- League: Lliga Comunitat – South
- 2024–25: Lliga Comunitat – South, 2nd of 16
- Website: www.cfialicante.com
Home colours	Away colours

Club de Fútbol Independiente Alicante is a Spanish football club based in Alicante in the Valencian Community. Founded in 2014, it plays in Lliga Comunitat – South, holding home games at Estadio Antonio Solana, with a capacity of 2,500 seats.

== History ==
Founded in 2014 as an heir to Alicante CF, adopting their colors and logo, CFI Alicante began to play in the Segunda Regional, the lowest tier of the Valencian regional divisions. After achieving promotion to Primera Regional in 2016, the club first reached the Regional Preferente in 2018.

In 2021, after having economic problems, the club reached a collaboration agreement with CF Intercity. The club played in the 2021–22 Copa del Rey, being knocked out by Real Betis.

On 14 July 2022, CFI Alicante reached another agreement with Intercity, to act as their reserve team for the 2022–23 season.

== Season to season ==
As an independent team

Season	Tier	Division	Place	Copa del Rey
2014–15	7	2ª Reg.	3rd	
2015–16	7	2ª Reg.	1st	
2016–17	6	1ª Reg.	3rd	
2017–18	6	1ª Reg.	1st	
2018–19	5	Reg. Pref.	4th	
2019–20	5	Reg. Pref.	2nd	
2020–21	5	Reg. Pref.	1st	
2021–22	6	Reg. Pref.	4th	First round

As the reserve team of CF Intercity

Season	Tier	Division	Place
2022–23	6	Reg. Pref.	6th
2023–24	6	Lliga Com.	7th
2024–25	6	Lliga Com.	2nd
2025–26	6	Lliga Com.	7th
2026–27	6	Lliga Com.	
