= 2005–06 Tercera División =

Spanish football league season

Tercera División
- Season: 2005–06
- Dates: August 2005–June 2006
- Matches played: 12,920

During the 2005–06 season, the Tercera División—the fourth tier of professional football in Spain—consisted of eighteen regional groups.

== Classification ==
Key to colors in league table:
Play-off for promotion
Direct relegation

=== Group I ===
Pos	Team	Pld	W	D	L	GF	GA	GD	Pts	Qualification or relegation
1	Deportivo Coruña B	38	29	6	3	74	20	+54	93	Play-Off
2	CD Lugo (P)	38	26	8	4	79	28	+51	86	Play-Off
3	Laracha CF	38	22	8	8	61	26	+35	74	Play-Off
4	Alondras CF	38	20	9	9	59	33	+26	69	Play-Off
5	Coruxo FC	38	20	7	11	64	32	+32	67	
6	CCD Cerceda	38	19	7	12	50	39	+11	64	
7	Arosa SC	38	18	5	15	53	54	−1	59	
8	Narón BP	38	16	7	15	54	51	+3	55	
9	Céltiga FC	38	15	10	13	52	54	−2	55	
10	Santa Comba CF	38	15	10	13	46	42	+4	55	
11	Bergantiños CF	38	15	8	15	49	45	+4	53	
12	Portonovo SD	38	13	11	14	37	40	−3	50	
13	Villalonga FC	38	12	11	15	39	44	−5	47	
14	CD Lalín	38	12	11	15	37	43	−6	47	
15	Rápido de Bouzas	38	11	11	16	43	42	+1	44	
16	Betanzos CF	38	10	11	17	38	54	−16	41	
17	Club Lemos	38	8	10	20	39	62	−23	34	
18	Viveiro CF (R)	38	4	11	23	32	75	−43	23	
19	SD O Val (R)	38	4	10	24	31	79	−48	22	
20	Caselas FC (R)	38	2	7	29	21	95	−74	13	

(P) Promoted; (R) Relegated

=== Group II ===
Pos	Team	Pld	W	D	L	GF	GA	GD	Pts	Qualification or relegation
1	Universidad de Oviedo (P)	38	23	12	3	76	28	+48	81	Play-Off
2	UP Langreo	38	23	9	6	54	32	+22	78	Play-Off
3	Ribadesella CF	38	21	12	5	61	30	+31	75	Play-Off
4	CD Lealtad	38	20	11	7	69	31	+38	71	Play-Off
5	Caudal Deportivo	38	18	14	6	52	29	+23	68	
6	Oviedo Astur CF	38	19	10	9	50	35	+15	67	
7	Sporting de Gijón B	38	15	10	13	41	37	+4	55	
8	Real Avilés Industrial	38	15	9	14	45	42	+3	54	
9	CD Covadonga	38	15	6	17	50	47	+3	51	
10	CD Mosconia	38	13	12	13	43	40	+3	51	
11	Club Siero	38	13	11	14	48	49	−1	50	
12	Navarro CF	38	11	14	13	35	37	−2	47	
13	Condal Club	38	12	10	16	42	56	−14	46	
14	UD Gijón Industrial	38	10	13	15	46	47	−1	43	
15	CD Tuilla	38	11	10	17	31	56	−25	43	
16	UC Ceares	38	10	10	18	35	49	−14	40	
17	Club Hispano	38	8	12	18	37	61	−24	36	
18	Real Tapia (R)	38	7	13	18	44	50	−6	34	
19	Berrón CF (R)	38	7	11	20	39	62	−23	32	
20	Real Titánico (R)	38	2	5	31	27	107	−80	11	

(P) Promoted; (R) Relegated

=== Group III ===
Pos	Team	Pld	W	D	L	GF	GA	GD	Pts	Qualification or relegation
1	Gimnástica Torrelavega (P)	38	27	5	6	88	26	+62	86	Play-Off
2	UM Escobedo	38	22	11	5	60	26	+34	77	Play-Off
3	CD Bezana	38	23	6	9	54	30	+24	75	Play-Off
4	SD Noja	38	21	11	6	70	42	+28	74	Play-Off
5	CD Tropezón	38	20	12	6	67	31	+36	72	
6	Velarde Camargo CF	38	21	9	8	62	37	+25	72	
7	CD Laredo	38	15	15	8	37	27	+10	60	
8	CF Ribamontán al Mar	38	15	9	14	56	51	+5	54	
9	Castro FC	38	14	11	13	65	64	+1	53	
10	Solares SD	38	14	8	16	53	56	−3	50	
11	Atlético Albericia	38	13	10	15	47	50	−3	49	
12	AD Trasmiera	38	10	11	17	37	49	−12	41	
13	SD Gama	38	11	7	20	47	61	−14	40	
14	CD Siete Villas	38	10	10	18	44	55	−11	40	
15	Santoña CF	38	10	10	18	37	55	−18	40	
16	SD Reocín	38	9	12	17	32	44	−12	39	
17	SD Barreda Balompié	38	10	9	19	33	59	−26	39	
18	CF Vimenor (R)	38	6	17	15	42	60	−18	35	
19	SD Revilla (R)	38	9	7	22	44	72	−28	34	
20	CD Barquereño (R)	38	4	2	32	33	113	−80	14	

(P) Promoted; (R) Relegated

=== Group IV ===
Pos	Team	Pld	W	D	L	GF	GA	GD	Pts	Qualification or relegation
1	Sestao River (P)	38	28	6	4	71	14	+57	90	Play-Off
2	SD Gernika Club	38	18	15	5	47	23	+24	69	Play-Off
3	SD Amorebieta	38	18	13	7	44	26	+18	67	Play-Off
4	CD Baskonia	38	18	10	10	53	33	+20	64	
5	Arenas C. Getxo	38	15	11	12	39	39	0	56	Play-Off
6	Llodio Salleko	38	14	12	12	50	53	−3	54	
7	SD San Pedro	38	14	11	13	50	40	+10	53	
8	CD Lagún Onak	38	14	11	13	39	41	−2	53	
9	SD Eibar B	38	14	10	14	38	30	+8	52	
10	Universidad PV	38	13	12	13	33	33	0	51	
11	CD Elgóibar	38	13	12	13	31	36	−5	51	
12	CD Santurtzi	38	11	16	11	38	38	0	49	
13	Tolosa CF	38	10	19	9	39	31	+8	49	
14	SD Beasaín	38	11	14	13	38	37	+1	47	
15	CD Aurrerá de Vitoria (R)	38	12	11	15	39	43	−4	47	
16	Zamudio SD (R)	38	9	14	15	35	46	−11	41	
17	SD Indautxu (R)	38	8	14	16	32	42	−10	38	
18	CD Getxo (R)	38	6	15	17	27	53	−26	33	
19	CD Aurrerá Ondarroa (R)	38	6	12	20	30	50	−20	30	
20	SD Salvatierra (R)	38	5	8	25	27	92	−65	23	

(P) Promoted; (R) Relegated

=== Group V ===
Pos	Team	Pld	W	D	L	GF	GA	GD	Pts	Qualification or relegation
1	Girona FC	38	25	9	4	86	40	+46	84	Play-Off
2	RCD Espanyol B (P)	38	25	7	6	84	32	+52	82	Play-Off
3	CF Gavà	38	19	10	9	72	44	+28	67	Play-Off
4	CF Vilanova	38	17	15	6	61	43	+18	66	Play-Off
5	CE Manresa	38	18	5	15	45	37	+8	59	
6	FC Santboià	38	17	7	14	47	45	+2	58	
7	UE Rapitenca	38	15	10	13	44	44	0	55	
8	CF Peralada	38	14	13	11	54	58	−4	55	
9	CF Balaguer	38	14	12	12	49	46	+3	54	
10	UE Castelldefels	38	13	13	12	42	37	+5	52	
11	CE Mataró	38	15	7	16	52	53	−1	52	
12	AE Prat	38	15	6	17	51	47	+4	51	
13	CE Europa	38	13	11	14	38	50	−12	50	
14	FC Barcelona C	38	12	7	19	40	50	−10	43	
15	CF Palafrugell	38	10	11	17	39	59	−20	41	
16	Palamós CF	38	11	7	20	35	63	−28	40	
17	UE Cornellà	38	10	8	20	39	63	−24	38	
18	FE Figueres (R)	38	9	9	20	40	56	−16	36	
19	UE Rubí (R)	38	7	12	19	38	57	−19	33	
20	EC Granollers (R)	38	8	7	23	37	69	−32	31	

(P) Promoted; (R) Relegated

=== Group VI ===
Pos	Team	Pld	W	D	L	GF	GA	GD	Pts	Qualification or relegation
1	Villarreal CF B	42	30	10	2	78	20	+58	100	Play-Off
2	Valencia CF B (P)	42	28	5	9	75	30	+45	89	Play-Off
3	CD Eldense (P)	42	22	14	6	69	34	+35	80	Play-Off
4	CD Denia	42	22	10	10	63	38	+25	76	Play-Off
5	Burjassot CF	42	22	9	11	65	38	+27	75	
6	Ontinyent CF	42	21	10	11	65	40	+25	73	
7	Novelda CF	42	20	12	10	52	39	+13	72	
8	CD Onda	42	18	10	14	58	46	+12	64	
9	CD Castellón B	42	16	14	12	50	44	+6	62	
10	CD Alone de Guardamar	42	14	13	15	47	51	−4	55	
11	Catarroja CF	42	15	10	17	47	50	−3	55	
12	FC Torrevieja	42	13	13	16	43	44	−1	52	
13	CD Dolores	42	14	8	20	45	69	−24	50	
14	Elche Ilicitano	42	13	8	21	33	47	−14	47	
15	UD Puzol	42	12	11	19	52	59	−7	47	
16	Alicante CF B	42	11	9	22	41	68	−27	42	
17	UD Oliva	42	11	8	23	32	63	−31	41	
18	Pego CF	42	11	8	23	45	67	−22	41	
19	CD Burriana (R)	42	9	12	21	37	61	−24	39	
20	CF Gandía (R)	42	9	12	21	36	58	−22	39	
21	CD Benicàssim (R)	42	8	13	21	38	73	−35	37	
22	Santa Pola CF (R)	42	7	13	22	29	61	−32	34	

(P) Promoted; (R) Relegated

=== Group VII ===
Pos	Team	Pld	W	D	L	GF	GA	GD	Pts	Qualification or relegation
1	Real Madrid C	38	25	5	8	80	31	+49	80	Play-Off
2	AD Parla	38	22	9	7	52	25	+27	75	Play-Off
3	CD Cobeña (P)	38	20	6	12	49	40	+9	66	Play-Off
4	Getafe CF B	38	18	11	9	48	33	+15	65	Play-Off
5	Atlético Pinto	38	16	12	10	51	32	+19	60	
6	Tres Cantos Pegaso	38	15	14	9	47	34	+13	59	
7	CD Ciempozuelos	38	13	17	8	42	38	+4	56	
8	Rayo Vallecano B	38	13	12	13	44	41	+3	51	
9	Rayo Majadahonda	38	13	11	14	37	37	0	50	
10	CD Coslada	38	14	8	16	43	50	−7	50	
11	CD San Fernando H.	38	11	16	11	32	37	−5	49	
12	CDA Navalcarnero	38	11	15	12	47	44	+3	48	
13	CD Las Rozas	38	11	15	12	28	29	−1	48	
14	DAV Santa Ana	38	12	10	16	37	46	−9	46	
15	Unión Collado Villalba	38	11	12	15	33	44	−11	45	
16	Atlético Aviación	38	13	5	20	39	46	−7	44	
17	RCD Carabanchel (R)	38	11	11	16	35	46	−11	44	
18	CD Colonia Moscardó (R)	38	9	11	18	28	53	−25	38	
19	CD Leganés B (R)	38	7	11	20	28	55	−27	32	
20	Real Aranjuez CF (R)	38	6	7	25	27	66	−39	25	

(P) Promoted; (R) Relegated

=== Group VIII ===
Pos	Team	Pld	W	D	L	GF	GA	GD	Pts	Qualification or relegation
1	Gimnástica Segoviana	38	31	4	3	89	16	+73	97	Play-Off
2	CD Mirandés	38	26	11	1	76	20	+56	89	Play-Off
3	CD Guijuelo	38	25	8	5	76	33	+43	83	Play-Off
4	CD Huracán Z	38	24	6	8	66	31	+35	78	Play-Off
5	CA Bembibre	38	21	6	11	68	38	+30	69	
6	Norma San Leonardo	38	18	9	11	52	42	+10	63	
7	Real Ávila CF	38	17	10	11	52	46	+6	61	
8	Cultural Leonesa B	38	16	6	16	49	48	+1	54	
9	Arandina CF	38	14	11	13	52	38	+14	53	
10	UD Salamanca B	38	12	15	11	53	51	+2	51	
11	CD Numancia B	38	14	7	17	53	63	−10	49	
12	SD Hullera VL	38	14	6	18	44	61	−17	48	
13	CD Jher Íscar	38	10	15	13	37	40	−3	45	
14	Universidad Valladolid	38	11	6	21	39	63	−24	39	
15	CD Becerril	38	11	5	22	47	65	−18	38	
16	La Bañeza FC	38	7	16	15	30	54	−24	37	
17	CD Benavente	38	9	8	21	39	66	−27	35	
18	Atlético Tordesillas (R)	38	9	4	25	42	83	−41	31	
19	CD Cebrereña (R)	38	4	8	26	32	75	−43	20	
20	SD Almazán (R)	38	5	3	30	25	88	−63	18	

(R) Relegated

=== Group IX ===
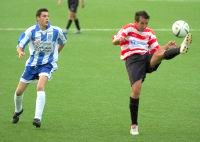
Alhaurín de la Torre CF and Granada CF playing a match.

Pos	Team	Pld	W	D	L	GF	GA	GD	Pts	Qualification or relegation
1	Granada CF	38	23	9	6	80	26	+54	78	Play-Off
2	Granada Atlético CF	38	23	9	6	64	21	+43	78	Play-Off
3	Motril CF	38	22	11	5	77	27	+50	77	Play-Off
4	Arenas CD	38	21	13	4	56	26	+30	76	Play-Off
5	Torredonjimeno CF	38	22	7	9	75	36	+39	73	
6	CD Roquetas	38	17	14	7	71	38	+33	65	
7	AD Huercalense	38	18	8	12	64	47	+17	62	
8	UD Fuengirola LB	38	16	9	13	73	49	+24	57	
9	UD Almería B	38	15	6	17	45	46	−1	51	
10	CD Imperio de Albolote	38	15	6	17	41	47	−6	51	
11	Alhaurín de la Torre CF	38	15	5	18	44	55	−11	50	
12	CD Vera de Almería	38	13	8	17	36	54	−18	47	
13	CD Alhaurino	38	11	13	14	44	36	+8	46	
14	UD Maracena	38	12	10	16	49	47	+2	46	
15	Loja CD	38	10	14	14	41	47	−6	44	
16	AD Comarca de Níjar	38	11	10	17	40	48	−8	43	
17	UD Carolinense	38	11	9	18	53	58	−5	42	
18	CD Santa Fe (R)	38	11	8	19	34	62	−28	41	
19	Úbeda CF (R)	38	4	4	30	19	95	−76	16	
20	CD Basto (R)	38	2	3	33	18	159	−141	9	

(R) Relegated

=== Group X ===
Pos	Team	Pld	W	D	L	GF	GA	GD	Pts	Qualification or relegation
1	Racing Club Portuense	38	22	11	5	55	25	+30	77	Play-Off
2	CD San Fernando	38	21	12	5	59	27	+32	75	Play-Off
3	Arcos CF	38	18	9	11	56	49	+7	63	Play-Off
4	RB Linense	38	18	9	11	55	42	+13	63	Play-Off
5	Atl. Sanluqueño CF	38	18	8	12	53	34	+19	62	
6	Real Betis B	38	17	10	11	67	47	+20	61	
7	Xerez CD B	38	15	11	12	62	43	+19	56	
8	Cádiz CF B	38	15	10	13	52	44	+8	55	
9	Atl. Lucentino Industrial	38	15	9	14	42	43	−1	54	
10	UD Los Barrios	38	14	12	12	57	55	+2	54	
11	Chiclana CF	38	13	10	15	49	62	−13	49	
12	UD Los Palacios	38	11	15	12	33	38	−5	48	
13	Puerto Real CF	38	13	9	16	43	54	−11	48	
14	Jerez Industrial CF	38	11	11	16	33	48	−15	44	
15	CD Mairena	38	10	12	16	38	53	−15	42	
16	Córdoba CF B	38	9	14	15	37	42	−5	41	
17	CD Pozoblanco	38	10	10	18	41	50	−9	40	
18	Dos Hermanas CF (R)	38	11	7	20	41	62	−21	40	
19	Coria CF (R)	38	9	7	22	32	63	−31	34	
20	Bollullos CF (R)	38	6	12	20	29	53	−24	30	

(R) Relegated

=== Group XI ===
Pos	Team	Pld	W	D	L	GF	GA	GD	Pts	Qualification or relegation
1	Santa Eulàlia	40	28	4	8	66	23	+43	88	Play-Off
2	RCD Mallorca B	40	27	5	8	94	34	+60	86	Play-Off
3	CD Ferriolense	40	25	9	6	80	31	+49	84	Play-Off
4	Sporting Mahonés	40	25	8	7	67	31	+36	83	Play-Off
5	SE Eivissa	40	22	8	10	70	36	+34	74	
6	CD Montuïri	40	22	6	12	59	46	+13	72	
7	Atlètic de Ciutadella	40	18	12	10	61	48	+13	66	
8	CD Binissalem	40	17	9	14	53	58	−5	60	
9	CD Santanyí	40	16	10	14	60	54	+6	58	
10	CD Manacor	40	12	12	16	51	60	−9	48	
11	CD Margaritense	40	12	11	17	49	59	−10	47	
12	UD Collerense	40	13	8	19	53	73	−20	47	
13	CD Constancia	40	12	10	18	51	60	−9	46	
14	CE Alaior	40	12	8	20	46	63	−17	44	
15	CF Sóller	40	12	8	20	47	67	−20	44	
16	UD Poblense	40	12	8	20	43	53	−10	44	
17	CF Vilafranca	40	10	12	18	33	50	−17	42	
18	CF Platges Calvià (R)	40	10	8	22	36	66	−30	38	
19	CD Soledad Paguera (R)	40	9	8	23	35	65	−30	35	
20	CE Felanitx (R)	40	7	10	23	34	72	−38	31	
21	UD Arenal (R)	40	6	12	22	36	75	−39	30	

(R) Relegated

=== Group XII ===
Pos	Team	Pld	W	D	L	GF	GA	GD	Pts	Qualification or relegation
1	UD Fuerteventura	38	22	9	7	46	25	+21	75	Play-Off
2	AD Laguna	38	21	9	8	64	34	+30	72	Play-Off
3	CD Orientación Marítima	38	20	8	10	58	48	+10	68	Play-Off
4	Atlético Granadilla	38	19	9	10	42	30	+12	66	Play-Off
5	UD Villa de Santa Brígida	38	19	7	12	56	42	+14	64	
6	CD Tenerife B	38	17	10	11	62	47	+15	61	
7	UD Realejos	38	14	9	15	45	54	−9	51	
8	UD Gáldar	38	14	9	15	53	48	+5	51	
9	CD Teguise	38	14	8	16	48	49	−1	50	
10	CD Doramas	38	12	14	12	38	33	+5	50	
11	UD Tenerife Sur Ibarra	38	13	10	15	57	55	+2	49	
12	SD Tenisca	38	14	6	18	49	50	−1	48	
13	UD Las Palmas B	38	11	14	13	55	45	+10	47	
14	UD Las Zocas	38	11	14	13	39	47	−8	47	
15	UD Tegueste	38	12	8	18	39	59	−20	44	
16	AD Huracán	38	10	13	15	39	50	−11	43	
17	CF Unión Antigua	38	10	12	16	38	54	−16	42	
18	CD Maspalomas (R)	38	10	12	16	46	59	−13	42	
19	CD Mensajero (R)	38	8	12	18	38	53	−15	36	
20	Universidad B (R)	38	8	9	21	36	66	−30	33	

(R) Relegated

=== Group XIII ===
Pos	Team	Pld	W	D	L	GF	GA	GD	Pts	Qualification or relegation
1	Orihuela CF	38	25	10	3	67	16	+51	85	Play-Off
2	AD Mar Menor	38	21	11	6	76	36	+40	74	Play-Off
3	Pinatar CF	38	19	12	7	65	43	+22	69	Play-Off
4	Cartagena Promesas	38	20	6	12	61	35	+26	66	Play-Off
5	Sangonera Atlético CF	38	18	12	8	60	30	+30	66	
6	Real Murcia B	38	16	13	9	63	36	+27	61	
7	Jumilla CF	38	16	11	11	45	44	+1	59	
8	Relesa Las Palas	38	17	7	14	47	43	+4	58	
9	CD La Unión	38	15	11	12	46	45	+1	56	
10	Ciudad de Murcia B	38	13	15	10	44	35	+9	54	
11	Mazarrón CF	38	13	10	15	47	45	+2	49	
12	CD Molinense	38	11	12	15	49	64	−15	45	
13	UD Horadada	38	11	12	15	44	50	−6	45	
14	Caravaca CF	38	11	10	17	39	46	−7	43	
15	EMD Lorquí	38	9	15	14	39	57	−18	42	
16	Calasparra FC	38	8	14	16	32	52	−20	38	
17	Moratalla CF	38	9	9	20	46	69	−23	36	
18	Muleño CF (R)	38	6	15	17	38	63	−25	33	
19	CD Balsicas (R)	38	8	9	21	39	70	−31	33	
20	Santomera CF (R)	38	4	6	28	26	94	−68	18	

(R) Relegated

=== Group XIV ===
Pos	Team	Pld	W	D	L	GF	GA	GD	Pts	Qualification or relegation
1	CF Villanovense	40	28	6	6	75	35	+40	90	Play-Off
2	AD Cerro Reyes Atl.	40	28	4	8	93	28	+65	88	Play-Off
3	CD Don Benito	40	23	13	4	86	32	+54	82	Play-Off
4	Sporting Villanueva Pr.	40	24	9	7	67	35	+32	81	Play-Off
5	CD Miajadas	40	18	11	11	68	64	+4	65	
6	Jerez CF	40	18	8	14	61	50	+11	62	
7	Imperio de Mérida CP	40	18	7	15	57	49	+8	61	
8	UP Plasencia	40	17	8	15	57	55	+2	59	
9	CP Cacereño	40	16	9	15	54	50	+4	57	
10	UC La Estrella	40	16	9	15	42	51	−9	57	
11	CD Santa Amalia	40	13	12	15	44	52	−8	51	
12	CF Extremadura B	40	13	8	19	56	69	−13	47	
13	CD Coria	40	13	7	20	58	83	−25	46	
14	Moralo CP	40	12	9	19	38	50	−12	45	
15	SP Villafranca	40	13	6	21	46	60	−14	45	
16	CP Olivenza	40	10	14	16	43	63	−20	44	
17	CP Monesterio	40	10	10	20	38	58	−20	40	
18	CP Amanecer (R)	40	10	9	21	35	56	−21	39	
19	CP Alburquerque (R)	40	8	15	17	46	65	−19	39	
20	CD Santa Marta (R)	40	10	7	23	34	67	−33	37	
21	CP Valdivia (R)	40	8	7	25	38	64	−26	31	

(R) Relegated

=== Group XV Navarra ===
Pos	Team	Pld	W	D	L	GF	GA	GD	Pts	Qualification or relegation
1	Peña Sport FC	36	24	6	6	72	35	+37	78	Play-Off
2	CD Iruña	36	21	8	7	77	49	+28	71	Play-Off
3	CD Valle de Egüés	36	21	8	7	70	31	+39	71	
4	CD Huarte	36	21	6	9	59	35	+24	69	
5	CD Oberena	36	17	15	4	57	29	+28	66	
6	CDU Mutilvera	36	17	5	14	43	33	+10	56	
7	CD Tudelano	36	13	10	13	39	39	0	49	
8	CD Aluvión	36	13	9	14	44	50	−6	48	
9	UCD Burladés	36	13	7	16	47	51	−4	46	
10	UDC Chantrea	36	12	9	15	38	41	−3	45	
11	CD Aoiz	36	12	8	16	44	49	−5	44	
12	CD Murchante	36	10	13	13	34	42	−8	43	
13	CA Cirbonero	36	9	14	13	52	64	−12	41	
14	CD Lourdes	36	9	12	15	39	59	−20	39	
15	CD River Ega	36	9	11	16	44	57	−13	38	
16	CD Lagun Artea (R)	36	11	5	20	43	61	−18	38	
17	CA Artajonés (R)	36	9	9	18	36	60	−24	36	
18	CD Beti Onak (R)	36	8	9	19	51	73	−22	33	
19	AD San Juan (R)	36	4	14	18	25	56	−31	26	

(R) Relegated

=== Group XV La Rioja ===
Pos	Team	Pld	W	D	L	GF	GA	GD	Pts	Qualification or relegation
1	Fundación Logroñés	32	27	4	1	106	22	+84	85	Play-Off
2	CD Logroñés	32	26	4	2	103	18	+85	82	Play-Off
3	Haro Deportivo	32	24	5	3	69	23	+46	77	
4	CD Calahorra	32	21	7	4	74	22	+52	70	
5	CD Varea	32	17	6	9	48	32	+16	57	
6	SD Oyonesa	32	13	7	12	39	46	−7	46	
7	CD Anguiano	32	13	5	14	48	69	−21	44	
8	CD Pradejón	32	9	11	12	34	49	−15	38	
9	CA River Ebro	32	8	12	12	36	48	−12	36	
10	Náxara CD	32	8	9	15	36	56	−20	33	
11	CD Arnedo	32	7	11	14	40	55	−15	32	
12	CD Agoncillo	32	8	8	16	40	55	−15	32	
13	ACD San Marcial	32	9	4	19	34	55	−21	31	
14	CF Rapid Murillo	32	8	7	17	37	68	−31	31	
15	CD Berceo (R)	32	7	6	19	20	59	−39	27	
16	CD Villegas (R)	32	4	7	21	36	67	−31	19	
17	CCD Alberite (R)	32	3	7	22	24	80	−56	16	

(R) Relegated

=== Group XVI ===
Pos	Team	Pld	W	D	L	GF	GA	GD	Pts	Qualification or relegation
1	Universidad Zaragoza (Note: Due to relegation to Real Zaragoza B from Segunda División B to this group, the 2nd reserve team, Universidad de Zaragoza, was forced to relegate to Preferente.)	38	20	7	11	63	34	+29	67	Play-Off
2	UD Barbastro	38	20	6	12	52	38	+14	66	Play-Off
3	Andorra CF	38	18	10	10	59	36	+23	64	Play-Off
4	AD Sabiñánigo	38	17	11	10	52	39	+13	62	Play-Off
5	Utebo FC	38	17	11	10	55	41	+14	62	
6	Atlético Monzón	38	15	16	7	66	36	+30	61	
7	CD Sariñena	38	17	9	12	46	37	+9	60	
8	CF Jacetano	38	14	10	14	38	38	0	52	
9	Alcañiz CF	38	13	12	13	51	55	−4	51	
10	CD Binéfar	38	12	14	12	33	30	+3	50	
11	CD Ebro	38	12	14	12	37	44	−7	50	
12	Atl. Calatayud	38	13	11	14	49	52	−3	50	
13	Villanueva CF	38	12	13	13	48	50	−2	49	
14	CD Zuera	38	12	12	14	43	50	−7	48	
15	CD Teruel	38	11	15	12	53	45	+8	48	
16	UD Casetas	38	13	9	16	41	50	−9	48	
17	CD La Almunia (R)	38	13	8	17	49	55	−6	47	
18	CD Mallén (R)	38	10	12	16	24	49	−25	42	
19	CD Fuentes (R)	38	9	9	20	41	64	−23	36	
20	CF Lalueza (R)	38	4	7	27	26	83	−57	19	

(R) Relegated

=== Group XVII ===
Pos	Team	Pld	W	D	L	GF	GA	GD	Pts	Qualification or relegation
1	UD Puertollano (P)	38	29	7	2	75	28	+47	94	Play-Off
2	CD Guadalajara	38	28	4	6	74	24	+50	88	Play-Off
3	CD Toledo	38	23	5	10	68	33	+35	74	Play-Off
4	Gimnástico Alcázar	38	19	11	8	59	39	+20	68	Play-Off
5	Albacete B	38	19	9	10	53	33	+20	66	
6	Manchego CF	38	18	10	10	38	29	+9	64	
7	CP Villarrobledo	38	16	11	11	63	47	+16	59	
8	UD Socuéllamos	38	15	12	11	50	38	+12	57	
9	Tomelloso CF	38	15	8	15	43	43	0	53	
10	CD Quintanar del Rey	38	14	10	14	42	48	−6	52	
11	La Roda Caja Rural CF	38	10	16	12	44	47	−3	46	
12	UD Talavera	38	12	10	16	40	51	−11	46	
13	Atlético Tarazona	38	11	9	18	42	54	−12	42	
14	CD Marchamalo	38	11	8	19	51	78	−27	41	
15	CF La Solana	38	11	7	20	38	55	−17	40	
16	CD Cuenca (Note: Due to relegation to UB Conquense from Segunda División B to this group, the reserve team, CD Cuenca, was forced to relegate to Preferente.)	38	11	6	21	44	62	−18	39	
17	CD Illescas	38	7	13	18	31	52	−21	34	
18	CD Quintanar (R)	38	10	4	24	35	67	−32	34	
19	CD Visel Villacañas (R)	38	7	7	24	42	77	−35	28	
20	Daimiel CF (R)	38	5	11	22	27	54	−27	26	

(P) Promoted; (R) Relegated
