= CD Onda =

Spanish football club

Onda
- Full name: Club Deportivo Onda
- Founded: 1921
- Ground: La Serratella, Onda, Valencia, Spain
- Capacity: 5,000
- President: (Spain) Mauro Barea
- Head coach: (Spain) Antonio Machado
- League: Lliga Comunitat – North
- 2024–25: Lliga Comunitat – North, 2nd of 16
| Home colours | Away colours |

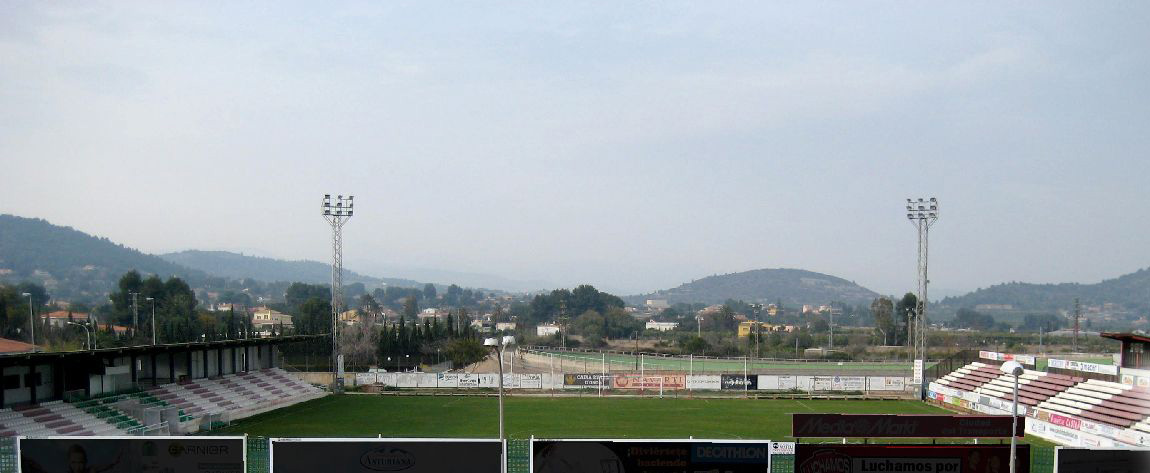
Campo Municipal Serratella

Club Deportivo Onda is a Spanish football team based in Onda, Castellón, in the autonomous community of Valencia. Founded in 1921 it plays in Lliga Comunitat – North, holding home games at Estadio La Serratella, with a capacity of 5,000 seats.

Onda was also a farm team for Villarreal CF between 2000 and 2002, and for Benidorm CF between 2009 and 2011.

== Season to season ==
| Season | Tier | Division | Place | Copa del Rey |
|---|---|---|---|---|
| 1949–50 | 5 | 2ª Reg. | 5th | |
| 1950–51 | 5 | 2ª Reg. | 1st | |
| 1951–52 | 5 | 2ª Reg. | 3rd | |
| 1952–53 | 5 | 2ª Reg. | 3rd | |
| 1953–54 | 5 | 2ª Reg. | 2nd | |
| 1954–55 | 4 | 1ª Reg. | 6th | |
| 1955–56 | 4 | 1ª Reg. | 2nd | |
| 1956–57 | 3 | 3ª | 11th | |
| 1957–58 | 3 | 3ª | 15th | |
| 1958–59 | 3 | 3ª | 10th | |
| 1959–60 | 3 | 3ª | 9th | |
| 1960–61 | 3 | 3ª | 13th | |
| 1961–62 | 3 | 3ª | 11th | |
| 1962–63 | 3 | 3ª | 9th | |
| 1963–64 | 3 | 3ª | 5th | |
| 1964–65 | 3 | 3ª | 9th | |
| 1965–66 | 3 | 3ª | 13th | |
| 1966–67 | 3 | 3ª | 8th | |
| 1967–68 | 3 | 3ª | 6th | |
| 1968–69 | 3 | 3ª | 8th | |

| Season | Tier | Division | Place | Copa del Rey |
|---|---|---|---|---|
| 1969–70 | 3 | 3ª | 15th | Second round |
| 1970–71 | 4 | Reg. Pref. | 13th | |
| 1971–72 | 4 | Reg. Pref. | 13th | |
| 1972–73 | 5 | 1ª Reg. | 5th | |
| 1973–74 | 5 | 1ª Reg. | 1st | |
| 1974–75 | 4 | Reg. Pref. | 20th | |
| 1975–76 | 5 | 1ª Reg. | 10th | |
| 1976–77 | 5 | 1ª Reg. | 5th | |
| 1977–78 | 6 | 1ª Reg. | 5th | |
| 1978–79 | 6 | 1ª Reg. | 7th | |
| 1979–80 | 6 | 1ª Reg. | 3rd | |
| 1980–81 | 6 | 1ª Reg. | 13th | |
| 1981–82 | 6 | 1ª Reg. | 2nd | |
| 1982–83 | 6 | 1ª Reg. | 2nd | |
| 1983–84 | 6 | 1ª Reg. | 1st | |
| 1984–85 | 5 | Reg. Pref. | 5th | |
| 1985–86 | 5 | Reg. Pref. | 2nd | |
| 1986–87 | 5 | Reg. Pref. | 6th | |
| 1987–88 | 5 | Reg. Pref. | 1st | |
| 1988–89 | 4 | 3ª | 6th | |

| Season | Tier | Division | Place | Copa del Rey |
|---|---|---|---|---|
| 1989–90 | 4 | 3ª | 4th | |
| 1990–91 | 4 | 3ª | 14th | First round |
| 1991–92 | 4 | 3ª | 11th | |
| 1992–93 | 5 | Reg. Pref. | 1st | |
| 1993–94 | 4 | 3ª | 6th | |
| 1994–95 | 4 | 3ª | 2nd | |
| 1995–96 | 4 | 3ª | 7th | |
| 1996–97 | 4 | 3ª | 11th | |
| 1997–98 | 4 | 3ª | 11th | |
| 1998–99 | 4 | 3ª | 9th | |
| 1999–2000 | 4 | 3ª | 1st | |
| 2000–01 | 4 | 3ª | 3rd | N/A (Note: Reserve team of Villarreal.) |
| 2001–02 | 3 | 2ª B | 19th | N/A |
| 2002–03 | 4 | 3ª | 3rd | |
| 2003–04 | 4 | 3ª | 5th | |
| 2004–05 | 4 | 3ª | 7th | |
| 2005–06 | 4 | 3ª | 8th | |
| 2006–07 | 4 | 3ª | 8th | |
| 2007–08 | 4 | 3ª | 9th | |
| 2008–09 | 4 | 3ª | 10th | |

| Season | Tier | Division | Place | Copa del Rey |
|---|---|---|---|---|
| 2009–10 | 4 | 3ª | 19th | N/A (Note: Reserve team of Benidorm.) |
| 2010–11 | 5 | Reg. Pref. | 12th | N/A |
| 2011–12 | 5 | Reg. Pref. | 8th | |
| 2012–13 | 5 | Reg. Pref. | 14th | |
| 2013–14 | 5 | Reg. Pref. | 9th | |
| 2014–15 | 5 | Reg. Pref. | 4th | |
| 2015–16 | 5 | Reg. Pref. | 4th | |
| 2016–17 | 5 | Reg. Pref. | 1st | |
| 2017–18 | 5 | Reg. Pref. | 5th | |
| 2018–19 | 5 | Reg. Pref. | 3rd | |
| 2019–20 | 5 | Reg. Pref. | 10th | |
| 2020–21 | 5 | Reg. Pref. | 5th | |
| 2021–22 | 6 | Reg. Pref. | 9th | |
| 2022–23 | 6 | Reg. Pref. | 5th | |
| 2023–24 | 6 | Lliga Com. | 5th | |
| 2024–25 | 6 | Lliga Com. | 2nd | |
| 2025–26 | 6 | Lliga Com. | 7th | |
| 2026–27 | 6 | Lliga Com. | | |

- 1 season in Segunda División B
- 34 seasons in Tercera División
