= Pego CF =

Spanish football club

Pego
- Full name: Pego Club de Fútbol
- Founded: 1947
- Ground: Cervantes, Pego, Valencia, Spain
- Capacity: 1,000
- Chairman: (Spain) Ximo Pujol
- Manager: (Spain) José Luis García
- League: Primera FFCV – Group 3
- 2024–25: Primera FFCV – Group 3, 13th of 16
Home colours	Away colours

Pego Club de Fútbol is a Spanish football team based in Pego, Alicante, in the autonomous community of Valencia. Founded in 1947, it plays in Primera FFCV – Group 3, holding home games at Camp de Futbol Cervantes, which has a capacity of 1,000 spectators.

== Season to season ==
Season	Tier	Division	Place	Copa del Rey
1947–48	5	2ª Reg.	4th	
1948–49	5	2ª Reg.	2nd	
1949–50	5	2ª Reg.		
1950–51	5	2ª Reg.		
1951–52	5	2ª Reg.	2nd	
1952–53	5	2ª Reg.	6th	
1953–54	5	2ª Reg.	6th	
1954–55	5	2ª Reg.	6th	
1955–56	5	2ª Reg.	4th	
1956–57	4	1ª Reg.	9th	
1957–58	5	2ª Reg.	1st	
1958–59	4	1ª Reg.	1st	
1959–60	3	3ª	14th	
1960–61	3	3ª	10th	
1961–62	3	3ª	15th	
1962–63	4	1ª Reg.	19th	
1963–64	4	1ª Reg.	(R)	
1964–65	DNP			
1965–66	DNP			
1966–67	6	3ª Reg.	1st	

Season	Tier	Division	Place	Copa del Rey
1967–68	5	2ª Reg.		
1968–69	5	2ª Reg.	2nd	
1969–70	5	2ª Reg.	6th	
1970–71	5	1ª Reg.	8th	
1971–72	5	1ª Reg.	10th	
1972–73	5	1ª Reg.	18th	
1973–74	6	2ª Reg.	6th	
1974–75	6	2ª Reg.	5th	
1975–76	6	2ª Reg.	11th	
1976–77	6	2ª Reg.	7th	
1977–78	7	2ª Reg.	1st	
1978–79	6	1ª Reg.	9th	
1979–80	6	1ª Reg.	4th	
1980–81	6	1ª Reg.	2nd	
1981–82	6	1ª Reg.	5th	
1982–83	6	1ª Reg.	7th	
1983–84	6	1ª Reg.	4th	
1984–85	5	Reg. Pref.	4th	
1985–86	5	Reg. Pref.	11th	
1986–87	5	Reg. Pref.	16th	

Season	Tier	Division	Place	Copa del Rey
1987–88	5	Reg. Pref.	1st	
1988–89	4	3ª	11th	
1989–90	4	3ª	15th	
1990–91	4	3ª	15th	
1991–92	4	3ª	11th	
1992–93	5	Reg. Pref.	8th	
1993–94	5	Reg. Pref.	9th	
1994–95	5	Reg. Pref.	4th	
1995–96	5	Reg. Pref.	1st	
1996–97	4	3ª	16th	
1997–98	4	3ª	10th	
1998–99	4	3ª	5th	
1999–2000	4	3ª	13th	
2000–01	4	3ª	4th	
2001–02	4	3ª	13th	
2002–03	4	3ª	7th	
2003–04	4	3ª	14th	
2004–05	4	3ª	14th	
2005–06	4	3ª	18th	
2006–07	4	3ª	10th	

Season	Tier	Division	Place	Copa del Rey
2007–08	4	3ª	17th	
2008–09	4	3ª	19th	
2009–10	5	Reg. Pref.	13th	
2010–11	5	Reg. Pref.	15th	
2011–12	5	Reg. Pref.	8th	
2012–13	5	Reg. Pref.	14th	
2013–14	5	Reg. Pref.	14th	
2014–15	5	Reg. Pref.	15th	
2015–16	5	Reg. Pref.	14th	
2016–17	5	Reg. Pref.	16th	
2017–18	6	1ª Reg.	1st	
2018–19	5	Reg. Pref.	8th	
2019–20	5	Reg. Pref.	10th	
2020–21	5	Reg. Pref.	14th	
2021–22	7	1ª Reg.	5th	
2022–23	7	1ª Reg.	2nd	
2023–24	7	1ª FFCV	12th	
2024–25	7	1ª FFCV	13th	
2025–26	7	1ª FFCV	8th	
2026–27	7	1ª FFCV		

- 20 seasons in Tercera División

== Notable former players ==
- (Spain) Natalio
- (Spain) Jorge Sanmiguel

== Notable former coaches ==
- (Spain) Nino Lema
