= Ciudad de Lorca CF =

Ciudad de Lorca
- Full name: Ciudad de Lorca Club de Fútbol
- Founded: 1969 as Abarán CF; 1999 as Atlético Abarán
- Dissolved: 2009
- Ground: Alfonso Embarre, Lorca, Spain
- Capacity: 2,000
- 2008–09: 3ª - Group 13, 20th
Home colours	Away colours

Ciudad de Lorca Club de Fútbol was a Spanish football club based in Lorca in the Region of Murcia. Founded in 1969 as Abarán CF and refounded in 1999 as Atlético Abarán, it disappeared in 2009; the club's home ground was Estadio Alfonso Embarre, which held 2,000 spectators.

== History ==
Abarán Club de Fútbol was founded in 1969 to replace CD Abarán which were dissolved two years earlier. They first reached Tercera División in 1988, and spent eight consecutive seasons in the division before being renamed to Club Deportivo Abarán in 1996.

In 1999, CD Abarán suffered relegation due to debts, and their place in the fourth division was bought by Atlético Abarán; CD Abarán still played one further season in the Territorial Preferente before being dissolved. In 2001, Atlético Abarán changed name back to Abarán Club de Fútbol, but were bought by FC Cartagena in 2004, being renamed to Cartagena Promesas Club de Fútbol, moving to Cartagena and becoming their reserve team.

In 2006, the affiliation agreement with Cartagena ended, and the club played the season under the name of Club Imperial Promesas Rincón de Seca in Rincón de Seca. In 2007, a local businessman named Gregorio Muñoz (Gori) bought the club, moved it to Lorca and renamed it to Ciudad de Lorca Club de Fútbol.

In 2009, after suffering relegation from the fourth division and having a € 40,000 debt, Gori unsuccessfully tried to sell the club to other businessmen, at they later were dissolved.

=== Club background ===
- Abarán Club de Fútbol (1969–1996; 2001–2004)
- Club Deportivo Abarán (1996–2000)
- Atlético Abarán (1999–2001)
- Cartagena Promesas Club de Fútbol (2004–2006)
- Club Imperial Promesas Rincón de Seca (2006–2007)
- Ciudad de Lorca Club de Fútbol (2007–2009)

== Season to season ==
=== Abarán CF/CD Abarán ===
Season	Tier	Division	Place	Copa del Rey
1969–70	5	2ª Reg.	2nd	
1970–71	5	2ª Reg.	2nd	
1971–72	5	1ª Reg.	2nd	
1972–73	4	Reg. Pref.	14th	
1973–74	4	Reg. Pref.	19th	
1974–75	5	1ª Reg.	3rd	
1975–76	4	Reg. Pref.	17th	
1976–77	4	Reg. Pref.	18th	
1977–78	5	Reg. Pref.	18th	
1978–79	6	1ª Reg.	11th	
1979–80	6	1ª Reg.	3rd	
1980–81	5	Reg. Pref.	8th	
1981–82	5	Reg. Pref.	17th	
1982–83	5	Reg. Pref.	12th	
1983–84	5	Reg. Pref.	13th	
1984–85	5	Reg. Pref.	16th	

Season	Tier	Division	Place	Copa del Rey
1985–86	5	Reg. Pref.	14th	
1986–87	5	Reg. Pref.	18th	
1987–88	5	Reg. Pref.	1st	
1988–89	4	3ª	4th	
1989–90	4	3ª	6th	
1990–91	4	3ª	12th	
1991–92	4	3ª	15th	
1992–93	4	3ª	11th	
1993–94	4	3ª	14th	
1994–95	4	3ª	8th	
1995–96	4	3ª	15th	
1996–97	4	3ª	10th	
1997–98	4	3ª	14th	
1998–99	4	3ª	13th	
1999–2000	5	Terr. Pref.	8th	

- 11 seasons in Tercera División

=== Atlético Abarán/Abarán CF ===
Season	Tier	Division	Place	Copa del Rey
1999–2000	4	3ª	17th	
2000–01	5	Terr. Pref.	2nd	
2001–02	4	3ª	11th	
2002–03	4	3ª	8th	
2003–04	4	3ª	17th	

- 4 seasons in Tercera División

=== Cartagena Promesas ===
Season	Tier	Division	Place
2004–05	4	3ª	9th
2005–06	4	3ª	4th

- 2 seasons in Tercera División

=== Imperial Promesas ===
Season	Tier	Division	Place	Copa del Rey
2006–07	4	3ª	15th	

- 1 season in Tercera División

=== Ciudad de Lorca ===
Season	Tier	Division	Place	Copa del Rey
2007–08	4	3ª	16th	
2008–09	4	3ª	20th	

- 2 seasons in Tercera División
