= CD Universidad de Zaragoza =

Spanish football club

Universidad de Zaragoza
- Full name: Club Deportivo Universidad de Zaragoza
- Founded: 1993
- Dissolved: 2012
- Ground: José Manuel Juan Boix, Zaragoza, Aragon, Spain
- Capacity: 1,000
- 2011–12: 3ª – Group 17, 16th
Home colours	Away colours

Club Deportivo Universidad de Zaragoza was a Spanish football club based in Zaragoza, in the autonomous community of Aragon. Founded in 1993 as an independent club, it became Real Zaragoza's second reserve team between 2001 and 2010, and was dissolved in 2012.

== History ==
The club was founded in 1993 after the merger of CD Universitario (founded in 1966) and AD Porcell (founded in 1974) under the name of CD Universitario Porcell. Renamed CD Universidad de Zaragoza in 1999, the club reached an agreement with Real Zaragoza to become their second reserve team (behind Real Zaragoza B) in 2001.

In 2010, the affiliation agreement between Zaragoza and Universidad ended, with Universidad only becoming a partner club. In 2012, after the club's financial crisis, they had to give up from playing in Tercera División, taking over the reserve team's place in Segunda Regional; in the following year, the club cut all associations with the University of Zaragoza, being refounded as CD Hispanidad.

=== Club background ===
- Club Deportivo Universitario Porcell (1993–1999)
- Club Deportivo Universidad de Zaragoza (1999–2001; 2010–2012)
- Club Deportivo Universidad-Real Zaragoza C (2001–2010)

== Season to season ==
Season	Tier	Division	Place	Copa del Rey
1993–94	6	1ª Reg.	2nd	
1994–95	5	Reg. Pref.	7th	
1995–96	5	Reg. Pref.	5th	
1996–97	5	Reg. Pref.	2nd	
1997–98	5	Reg. Pref.	9th	
1998–99	5	Reg. Pref.	8th	
1999–2000	5	Reg. Pref.	6th	
2000–01	5	Reg. Pref.	7th	
2001–02	5	Reg. Pref.	1st	N/A (Note: Second reserve team of Zaragoza.)
2002–03	4	3ª	10th	N/A

Season	Tier	Division	Place	Copa del Rey
2003–04	4	3ª	7th	N/A
2004–05	4	3ª	3rd	N/A
2005–06	4	3ª	1st	N/A
2006–07	5	Reg. Pref.	1st	N/A
2007–08	5	Reg. Pref.	1st	N/A
2008–09	5	Reg. Pref.	1st	N/A
2009–10	5	Reg. Pref.	2nd	N/A
2010–11	5	Reg. Pref.	1st	
2011–12	4	3ª	16th	

- 5 seasons in Tercera División
