= Estadio La Fuensanta =

Stadium in Castilla–La Mancha, Spain

Coordinates: 40°04′38″N 2°08′25″W

La Fuensanta
- Interactive map of La Fuensanta
- Full name: Estadio Municipal La Fuensanta
- Location: Cuenca, Castilla–La Mancha, Spain
- Capacity: 6,000
- Surface: Grass
- Field size: 105 m × 68 m (344 ft × 223 ft)

Construction
- Opened: 1940
- Expanded: 2011

Tenant
- UB Conquense

The Estadio La Fuensanta is a multi-use stadium located in Cuenca, Castilla–La Mancha, Spain. It is currently used for football matches and is the home stadium of UB Conquense.

== History ==
The Fuensata was opened in the 1940s, and UB Conquense began to play home games here since its foundation in 1946. With the promotion of Conquense to Segunda B in the 1997-98 season, the stadium didn't meet the needs of the club.
