= Alicante CF =

Alicante
- Full name: Alicante Club de Fútbol
- Nicknames: Celestes, Moros
- Founded: 14 April 1918; 108 years ago
- Dissolved: 23 March 2015; 11 years ago
- Ground: Estadio Alicante CF; Alicante, Valencian Community, Spain
- Capacity: 2,500
- President: Andrés Ariza
- Head coach: Modesto Coloma Moyá
- League: Regional Preferente
- 2013–14: Regional Preferente, 6th
Home colours	Away colours

Alicante Club de Fútbol was a Spanish football team based in Alicante, in the Valencian Community. Founded in 1918, it played its home matches at Estadio Alicante CF, with a 4,000-seat capacity.

== History ==
Alicante Club de Fútbol, under their previous name, were formed in 1918. Five years later, in 1923, the club joined the Valencian Football Federation, with Joaquín Tomás Terol being its first official president.

The team spent the vast majority of its early existence in the Tercera División, whilst also having very brief spells in the second division (1939–40 – as Alicante Football Club – 1951–52 and 1956–58). For eight years in the 60's, the club acted as the feeder team for neighbours Hércules CF.

In the 2000s, the club firmly established itself as one of the third level's strongest sides. However, the team still failed to get promoted, frequently missing promotion via the playoffs, until 2007–08, in which Alicante were finally promoted to the Segunda División. In the same season, the team famously took La Liga powerhouse Real Madrid to task in the fourth round of the Copa del Rey, only losing in 2–3 on aggregate against the team two divisions above.

Facing severe economic problems during the 2008–09 season, Alicante were immediately relegated back to the third division, despite a strong start to the season. The financial situation persisted in the following years and, on 1 July 2011, at the end of 2010–11, the team was relegated to the fourth division after failing to pay its players on time.

In June 2014, Alicante CF was dissolved and replaced by CFI Alicante, who adopted its colors and its logo.

== Season to season ==
- As Alicante Football Club

Season	Tier	Division	Place	Copa del Rey
1928–29	4	Regional		
1929–30	4	Regional		
1930–31	4	Regional		
1931–32	3	3ª	3rd	
1932–33	4	Regional		
1933–34	3	3ª	1st	
1934–35	4	Regional		
1935–36	4	Regional		
1939–40	2	2ª	3rd	
1940–41	3	3ª	4th	

- As Lucentum Club de Fútbol

Season	Tier	Division	Place	Copa del Rey
1941–42	4	1ª Reg.	3rd	

- As Alicante Club de Fútbol

Season	Tier	Division	Place	Copa del Rey
1942–43	4	1ª Reg.	3rd	
1943–44	3	3ª	4th	
1944–45	3	3ª	8th	
1945–46	3	3ª	9th	
1946–47	3	3ª	1st	
1947–48	3	3ª	4th	
1948–49	3	3ª	7th	
1949–50	3	3ª	9th	
1950–51	3	3ª	2nd	
1951–52	2	2ª	15th	
1952–53	3	3ª	8th	
1953–54	3	3ª	5th	
1954–55	3	3ª	5th	
1955–56	3	3ª	2nd	
1956–57	2	2ª	15th	
1957–58	2	2ª	17th	
1958–59	3	3ª	2nd	
1959–60	3	3ª	12th	
1960–61	3	3ª	5th	
1961–62	3	3ª	6th	

Season	Tier	Division	Place	Copa del Rey
1962–63	3	3ª	9th	
1963–64	3	3ª	8th	
1964–65	3	3ª	5th	
1965–66	3	3ª	4th	
1966–67	3	3ª	3rd	
1967–68	3	3ª	15th	
1968–69	4	1ª Reg.	8th	
1969–70	4	1ª Reg.	11th	
1970–71	4	1ª Reg.	2nd	
1971–72	4	Reg. Pref.	5th	
1972–73	4	Reg. Pref.	2nd	
1973–74	4	Reg. Pref.	8th	
1974–75	4	Reg. Pref.	2nd	
1975–76	4	Reg. Pref.	12th	
1976–77	4	Reg. Pref.	8th	
1977–78	5	Reg. Pref.	3rd	
1978–79	5	Reg. Pref.	1st	
1979–80	4	3ª	14th	
1980–81	4	3ª	10th	
1981–82	4	3ª	4th	

Season	Tier	Division	Place	Copa del Rey
1982–83	4	3ª	10th	
1983–84	4	3ª	16th	
1984–85	4	3ª	10th	
1985–86	4	3ª	12th	
1986–87	4	3ª	10th	
1987–88	4	3ª	11th	
1988–89	4	3ª	18th	
1989–90	4	3ª	10th	
1990–91	4	3ª	9th	
1991–92	4	3ª	14th	
1992–93	5	Reg. Pref.	1st	
1993–94	4	3ª	8th	
1994–95	4	3ª	10th	
1995–96	4	3ª	12th	
1996–97	4	3ª	19th	
1997–98	5	Reg. Pref.	2nd	

Season	Tier	Division	Place	Copa del Rey
1998–99	5	Reg. Pref.	1st	
1999–2000	4	3ª	4th	
2000–01	4	3ª	1st	
2001–02	3	2ª B	6th	
2002–03	3	2ª B	5th	Round of 16
2003–04	3	2ª B	6th	
2004–05	3	2ª B	1st	
2005–06	3	2ª B	3rd	
2006–07	3	2ª B	1st	
2007–08	3	2ª B	2nd	
2008–09	2	2ª	20th	
2009–10	3	2ª B	13th	
2010–11	3	2ª B	9th	
2011–12	4	3ª	19th	
2012–13	5	Reg. Pref.	14th	
2013–14	5	Reg. Pref.	6th	

- 5 seasons in Segunda División
- 9 seasons in Segunda División B
- 45 seasons in Tercera División

== Stadium ==
Alicante held home games at Estadio Alicante CF, inside the Ciudad Deportiva de Villafranqueza, with a 4,000-seat capacity. Previously owned by the club, it was then purchased by the City Hall, and the team held their official matches there since 1979.

However, between 2001 and 2010, Alicante played at the Estadio José Rico Pérez, the home ground of Hércules CF. After returning to the third division, Villafranqueza did not possess the required structures to host games in the category, and the municipal authorities refused to renew them.

== See also ==
- Alicante CF B, Alicante CF's reserve team
