= List of UD Almería managers =

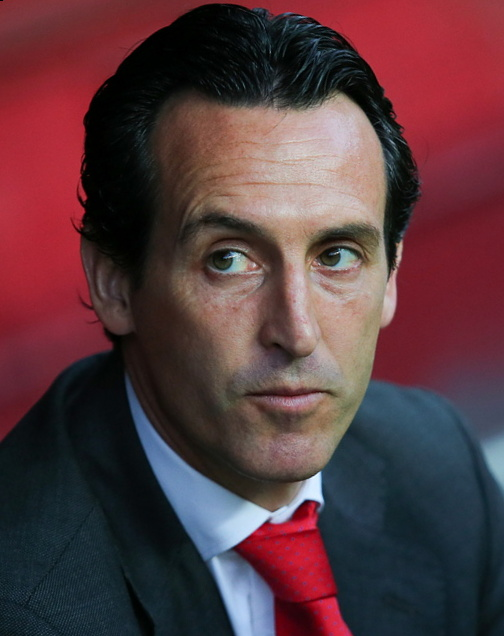
Unai Emery was in charge of the club during its most successful era.

UD Almería is a Spanish professional football club based in Almería, Andalusia. The first manager of the club was Pepe Navarro.

The most successful manager of Almería was Unai Emery, who achieved the club's first ever promotion to La Liga and took them to a final eighth position in 2007–08 (the club's best overall).

== List of managers ==
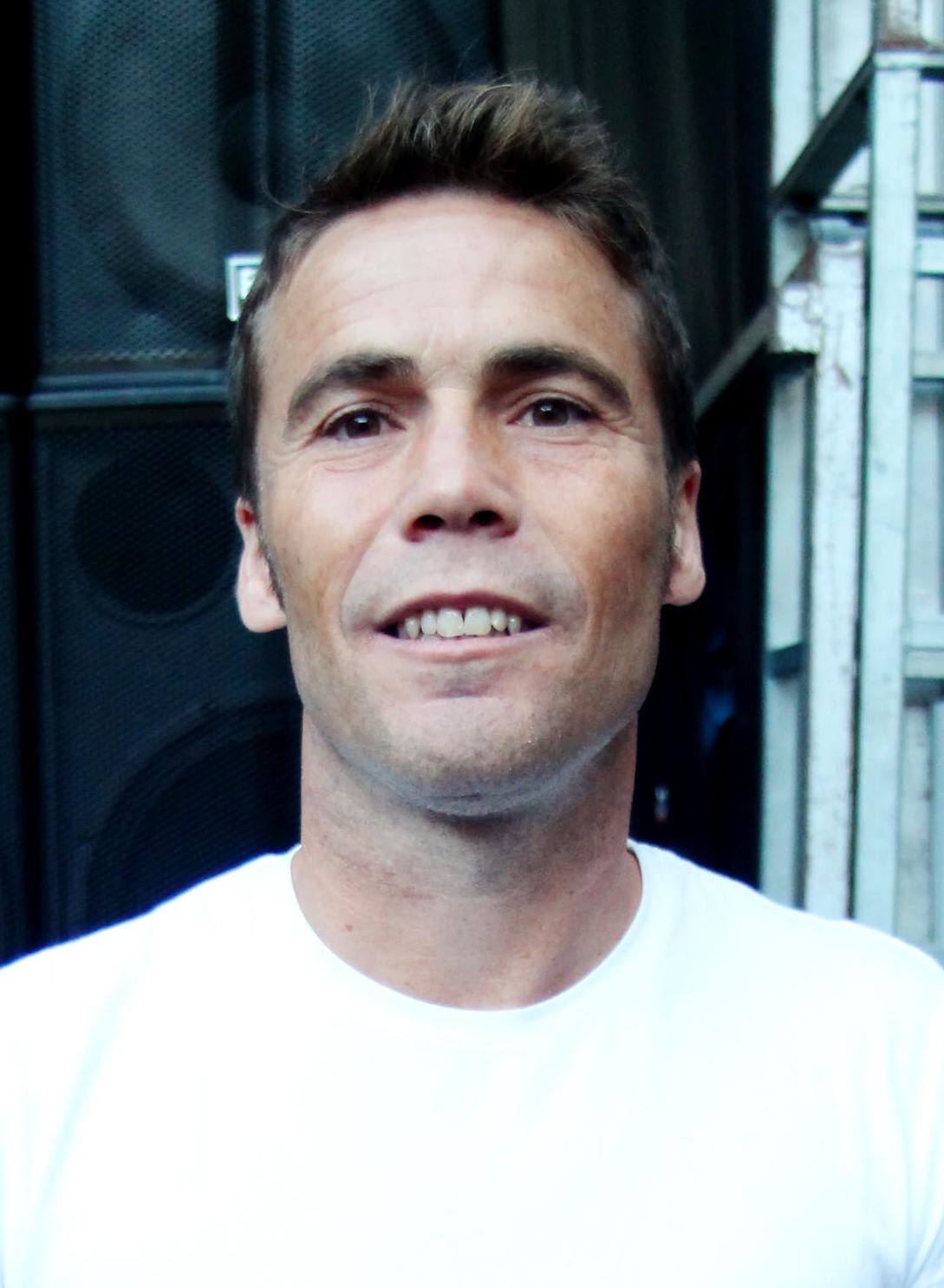
Rubi is the current manager of the club.

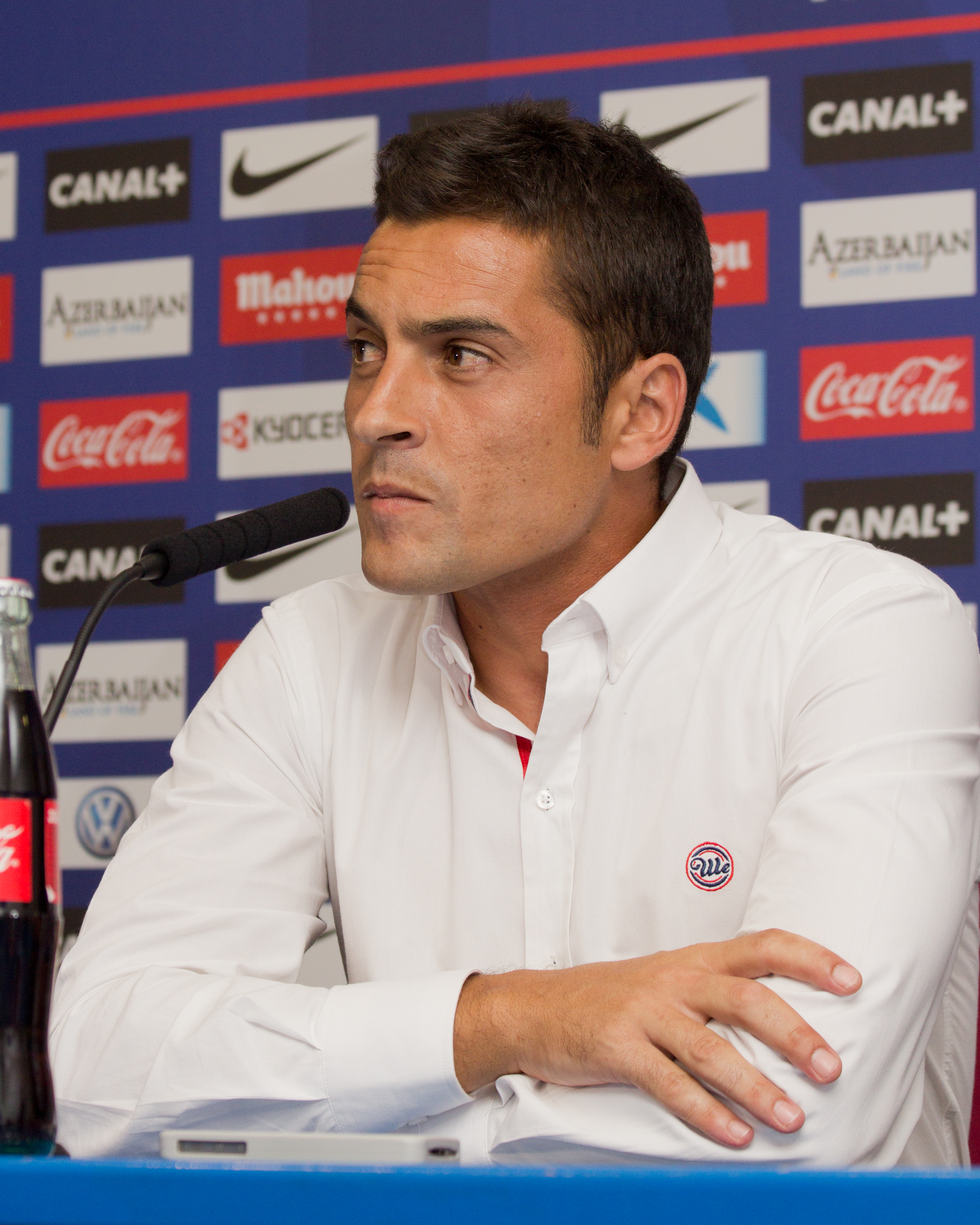
Francisco was the only manager of the club who managed the reserves along with the main squad in La Liga. He is also the manager with more matches in the top level.

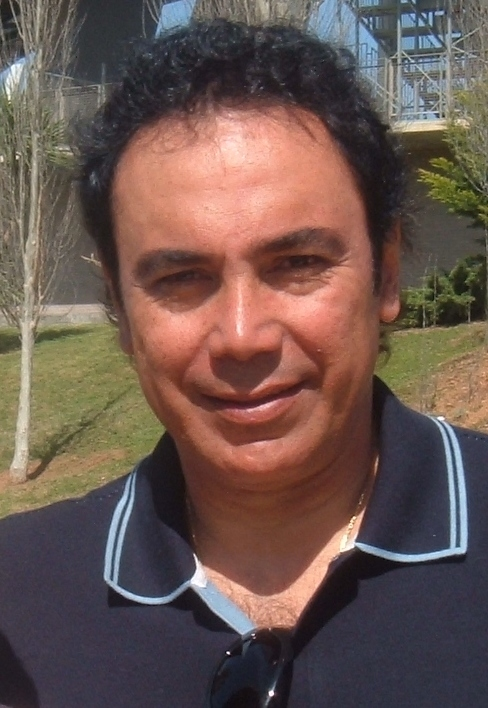
Mexican Hugo Sánchez was the first non-European and still the only North American manager of Almería's history.

| Name | From | To | M | W | D | L | Win % |
| (Spain) Pepe Navarro | 1989 | 1990 | – | – | – | – | – |
| (Spain) Amador Capel | 1990 | | – | – | – | – | – |
| (Spain) Antonio Belmonte | 1990 | | – | – | – | – | – |
| (Spain) Pepe Navarro | 1990 | 1991 | – | – | – | – | – |
| (Spain) Antonio Oviedo | 1991 | 1992 | 34 | 27 | 6 | 1 | 79.41% |
| (Spain) Pepe Cayuela | 1992 | 1993 | 40 | 28 | 8 | 4 | 70.00% |
| (Spain) Pedro Buenaventura | June 1993 | December 1993 | 17 | 5 | 6 | 6 | 29.41% |
| (Spain) Juan Román | December 1993 | January 1994 | 2 | 0 | 0 | 2 | 0.00% |
| (Spain) Rogelio Palomo | January 1994 | June 1994 | 19 | 8 | 5 | 6 | 42.10% |
| (Spain) José Enrique Díaz | June 1994 | April 1995 | 34 | 16 | 8 | 10 | 47.06% |
| (Spain) Pepe Cayuela | April 1995 | November 1995 | 29 | 17 | 5 | 7 | 58.62% |
| (Spain) Quique Hernández | November 1995 | March 1996 | 16 | 5 | 4 | 7 | 31.25% |
| (Spain) Pepe Cayuela | March 1996 | April 1996 | 8 | 1 | 5 | 2 | 12.50% |
| (Spain) Esteban Vigo | April 1996 | May 1996 | 3 | 0 | 2 | 1 | 0.00% |
| (Spain) Gonzalo Hurtado | June 1996 | November 1996 | 14 | 4 | 5 | 5 | 28.57% |
| (Spain) Pepe Navarro | November 1996 | December 1996 | 3 | 1 | 1 | 1 | 33.33% |
| (Germany) Uli Stielike | December 1996 | February 1997 | 11 | 1 | 5 | 5 | 9.09% |
| (Spain) Pedro Braojos | February 1997 | June 1997 | 14 | 5 | 3 | 6 | 35.71% |
| (Spain) José Ángel Moreno | June 1997 | April 1998 | 34 | 14 | 11 | 9 | 41.18% |
| (Spain) Pepe Navarro | April 1998 | May 1998 | 6 | 2 | 2 | 2 | 33.33% |
| (Spain) Lucas Alcaraz | June 1998 | November 1998 | 11 | 2 | 5 | 3 | 18.18% |
| (Spain) Floro Garrido | November 1998 | December 1998 | 4 | 2 | 0 | 2 | 50.00% |
| (Spain) Ramón Blanco | December 1998 | May 1999 | 20 | 3 | 11 | 6 | 15.00% |
| (Spain) José María Salmerón | May 1999 | January 2001 | 24 | 6 | 8 | 10 | 25.00% |
| (Spain) Casuco | January 2001 | January 2004 | 127 | 52 | 39 | 36 | 40.94% |
| (Spain) Alfonsín | January 2004 | February 2004 | 1 | 0 | 1 | 0 | 0.00% |
| (Spain) Luis Ángel Duque | February 2004 | April 2004 | 24 | 6 | 8 | 10 | 25.00% |
| (Spain) Alfonsín | April 2004 | June 2004 | 11 | 4 | 4 | 3 | 36.36% |
| (Spain) Fernando Santos | June 2004 | January 2005 | 20 | 6 | 7 | 7 | 30.00% |
| (Spain) Alfonsín | January 2005 | February 2005 | 5 | 1 | 1 | 3 | 20.00% |
| (Spain) Fabri | February 2005 | April 2005 | 7 | 1 | 2 | 4 | 14.29% |
| (Spain) Paco Flores | April 2005 | June 2006 | 54 | 25 | 11 | 18 | 46.30% |
| (Spain) Unai Emery | July 2006 | May 2008 | 84 | 39 | 20 | 25 | 46.43% |
| (Spain) Gonzalo Arconada | June 2008 | December 2008 | 18 | 6 | 4 | 8 | 33.33% |
| (Mexico) Hugo Sánchez | December 2008 | December 2009 | 41 | 12 | 8 | 21 | 29.27% |
| (Spain) Juanma Lillo | December 2009 | November 2010 | 37 | 10 | 14 | 13 | 27.03% |
| (Spain) José Luis Oltra | November 2010 | April 2011 | 24 | 8 | 5 | 11 | 33.33% |
| (Spain) Roberto Olabe | April 2011 | May 2011 | 8 | 1 | 1 | 6 | 12.50% |
| (Spain) Lucas Alcaraz | June 2011 | March 2012 | 35 | 15 | 14 | 6 | 42.86% |
| (Spain) Esteban Vigo | March 2012 | June 2012 | 11 | 5 | 3 | 3 | 45.45% |
| (Spain) Javi Gracia | June 2012 | June 2013 | 50 | 28 | 9 | 13 | 56.00% |
| (Spain) Francisco | June 2013 | December 2014 | 57 | 15 | 13 | 29 | 26.32% |
| (Spain) Miguel Rivera | December 2014 | December 2014 | 1 | 0 | 0 | 1 | 0.00% |
| (Spain) Juan Ignacio Martínez | December 2014 | April 2015 | 17 | 5 | 4 | 8 | 29.41% |
| (Spain) Sergi Barjuán | April 2015 | October 2015 | 17 | 5 | 2 | 10 | 29.41% |
| (Spain) Miguel Rivera | October 2015 | October 2015 | 4 | 1 | 2 | 1 | 25.00% |
| (Spain) Joan Carrillo | October 2015 | December 2015 | 12 | 0 | 6 | 6 | 0.00% |
| (Argentina) Néstor Gorosito | December 2015 | May 2016 | 20 | 6 | 8 | 6 | 30.00% |
| (Spain) Fernando Soriano | May 2016 | February 2017 | 32 | 8 | 9 | 15 | 25.00% |
| (Spain) Fran Fernández | February 2017 | March 2017 | 2 | 1 | 1 | 0 | 50.00% |
| (Spain) Luis Miguel Ramis | March 2017 | November 2017 | 28 | 10 | 4 | 14 | 35.71% |
| (Spain) Fran Fernández | November 2017 | November 2017 | 1 | 1 | 0 | 0 | 100.00% |
| (Spain) Lucas Alcaraz | November 2017 | April 2018 | 21 | 6 | 6 | 9 | 28.57% |
| (Spain) Fran Fernández | April 2018 | June 2019 | 52 | 19 | 19 | 14 | 36.54% |
| (Spain) Óscar Fernández | June 2019 | August 2019 | 0 | 0 | 0 | 0 | 0.00% |
| (Portugal) Pedro Emanuel | August 2019 | November 2019 | 14 | 6 | 6 | 2 | 42.86% |
| (Spain) Guti | November 2019 | June 2020 | 22 | 9 | 5 | 8 | 40.91% |
| (Portugal) Mário Silva | June 2020 | July 2020 | 7 | 2 | 2 | 3 | 28.57% |
| (Portugal) José Gomes | July 2020 | April 2021 | 43 | 21 | 9 | 13 | 48.84% |
| (Spain) Rubi | April 2021 | June 2023 | 92 | 39 | 21 | 32 | 42.39% |
| (Spain) Vicente Moreno | June 2023 | September 2023 | 7 | 0 | 2 | 5 | 0.00% |
| (Spain) Alberto Lasarte | September 2023 | October 2023 | 2 | 0 | 1 | 1 | 0.00% |
| (Spain) Gaizka Garitano | October 2023 | March 2024 | 21 | 1 | 7 | 13 | 4.76% |
| (Spain) Pepe Mel | March 2024 | May 2024 | 10 | 3 | 3 | 4 | 30.00% |
| (Spain) Rubi | June 2024 | | 15 | 7 | 4 | 4 | 46.67% |

== See also ==
- UD Almería statistics
- UD Almería seasons
