= List of UD Almería seasons =

This is a list of seasons played by Unión Deportiva Almería, S.A.D. in Spanish and European football, from 1947 (the years of Atlético Almería's foundation) to the most recent completed season.

This list details the club's achievements in all major competitions, and the top scorers for each season. Top scorers in bold were also the top scorers in the Spanish league that season. Only Copa del Rey is included.

== Seasons ==
=== As Atlético Almería ===
Season	League									Copa del Rey	Supercopa de España	Europe Other	Top goalscorer(s)	
Season	Division	Pld	W	D	L	GF	GA	Pts	Pos	Copa del Rey	Supercopa de España	Europe Other	Player(s)	Goals
1947–48 Details	Ter	26	12	3	11	49	48	27	7th	–	–	–		
1948–49 Details	Ter	26	13	2	11	57	51	28	5th	–	–	–		
1949–50 Details	Ter	34	14	2	18	77	80	30	12th	–	–	–		
1950–51 Details	Ter	30	16	5	9	57	45	37	4th	–	–	–		
1951–52 Details	Ter	26	16	3	7	70	37	35	2nd	–	–	–		
1952–53 Details	Ter	30	15	2	13	55	49	32	9th	–	–	–		
1953–54 Details	Ter	36	17	6	13	72	46	38	6th	–	–	–		
1954–55 Details	Ter	18	10	1	7	45	33	21	4th	–	–	–		
1955–56 Details	Ter	22	13	2	7	60	31	28	2nd	–	–	–		
1956–57 Details	Ter	28	13	5	10	58	35	31	6th	–	–	–		
1957–58 Details	Ter	38	27	4	7	99	37	58	**1st**	–	–	–		
1958–59 Details	Seg	30	14	4	12	47	41	32	3rd	1R	–	–	Glaría I	15
1959–60 Details	Seg	30	7	9	14	24	57	23	15th	1R	–	–	Fábregas Francisco León	5

=== As CD Hispania/CD Almería ===
Season	League									Copa del Rey	Supercopa de España	Europe Other	Top goalscorer(s)	
Season	Division	Pld	W	D	L	GF	GA	Pts	Pos	Copa del Rey	Supercopa de España	Europe Other	Player(s)	Goals
1960–61 Details	Reg								2nd	–	–	–		
1961–62 Details	Ter	30	16	6	8	60	42	38	5th	–	–	–		
1962–63 Details	Ter	28	18	3	7	59	30	39	**1st**	–	–	–		
1963–64 Details	Ter	30	11	6	13	38	41	28	11th	–	–	–		
1964–65 Details	Ter	30	17	6	7	43	25	40	2nd	–	–	–		
1965–66 Details	Ter	28	15	6	7	46	27	36	3rd	–	–	–		
1966–67 Details	Ter	30	17	7	6	54	28	41	2nd	–	–	–		
1967–68 Details	Ter	30	21	2	7	57	23	44	2nd	–	–	–		
1968–69 Details	Reg								R	–	–	–		

=== As AD Almería ===
Season	League									Copa del Rey	Supercopa de España	Europe Other	Top goalscorer(s)	
Season	Division	Pld	W	D	L	GF	GA	Pts	Pos	Copa del Rey	Supercopa de España	Europe Other	Player(s)	Goals
1971–72 Details	Reg	38	32	2	4	92	20	66	**1st**	–	–	–		
1972–73 Details	Ter	38	17	5	16	57	55	39	10th	–	–	–		
1973–74 Details	Ter	38	20	12	6	46	23	52	2nd	–	–	–		
1974–75 Details	Ter	38	14	7	17	53	46	35	16th	–	–	–		
1975–76 Details	Ter	38	21	8	9	64	35	50	2nd	–	–	–		
1976–77 Details	Ter	36	19	7	10	68	34	45	3rd	–	–	–		
1977–78 Details	Seg B	38	25	6	7	68	27	41	**1st**	1R	–	–		
1978–79 Details	Seg	38	21	5	12	44	33	47	**1st**	4R	–	–	Clemente Rolón	12
1979–80 Details	Pri	34	11	11	12	41	50	33	9th	R16	–	–	Clemente Rolón	12
1980–81 Details	Pri	34	6	7	21	30	66	19	18th	3R	–	–	Clemente Rolón	7
1981–82 Details	Seg	38	6	18	14	27	43	26	18th	2R	–	–	Manolín Ricardo Martínez Clemente Rolón	5

=== As Almería CF/UD Almería ===
Season	League									Copa del Rey	Supercopa de España	Europe Other	Top goalscorer(s)	
Season	Division	Pld	W	D	L	GF	GA	Pts	Pos	Copa del Rey	Supercopa de España	Europe Other	Player(s)	Goals
1989–90 Details	Reg	38	25	8	5	84	26	58	**1st**	–	–	–		
1990–91 Details	Reg	34	20	9	5	82	40	49	3rd	–	–	–		
1991–92 Details	Reg	34	27	6	1	86	19	60	2nd	–	–	–		
1992–93 Details	Ter	38	28	7	3	88	26	63	2nd	1R	–	–		
1993–94 Details	Seg B	38	13	11	14	48	47	37	11th	2R	–	–	José Cano	10
1994–95 Details	Seg B	38	23	6	9	69	31	52	2nd	4R	–	–	Manuel Sousa	13
1995–96 Details	Seg	38	10	14	14	42	47	44	16th	2R	–	–	Nikola Milinković	12
1996–97 Details	Seg	38	9	14	15	40	51	41	17th	2R	–	–	Juan Paniagua	17
1997–98 Details	Seg B	38	15	13	10	37	30	58	7th	1R	–	–	Manuel Sousa	13
1998–99 Details	Seg B	38	8	16	14	45	40	40	18th	–	–	–	Raúl Sánchez	7
1999–2000 Details	Ter	38	21	12	5	61	23	75	4th	–	–	–	–	–
2000–01 Details	Seg B	38	10	16	10	41	37	46	11th	–	–	–	Raúl Sánchez	16
2001–02 Details	Seg B	38	22	7	9	56	35	73	3rd	–	–	–	Raúl Sánchez	25
2002–03 Details	Seg	42	12	14	16	54	63	50	18th	R32	–	–	Francisco	15
2003–04 Details	Seg	42	11	17	14	45	49	50	13th	R32	–	–	Francisco	16
2004–05 Details	Seg	42	12	12	17	35	44	48	16th	2R	–	–	Ibán Espadas Roberto Nanni	5
2005–06 Details	Seg	42	20	7	15	54	43	67	6th	1R	–	–	Albert Crusat José Ortiz	8
2006–07 Details	Seg	42	24	8	10	73	49	80	2nd	3R	–	–	Míchel	12
2007–08 Details	Pri	38	14	10	14	42	45	52	8th	R32	–	–	Álvaro Negredo	13
2008–09 Details	Pri	38	13	7	18	45	61	46	11th	R16	–	–	Álvaro Negredo	19
2009–10 Details	Pri	38	10	12	16	43	55	42	13th	R32	–	–	Kalu Uche	9
2010–11 Details	Pri	38	6	12	20	36	70	30	20th	SF	–	–	Leonardo Ulloa	13
2011–12 Details	Seg	42	18	16	8	63	43	70	7th	R32	–	–	**Leonardo Ulloa**	29
2012–13 Details	Seg	42	22	8	12	72	50	74	3rd	R32	–	–	**Charles**	32
2013–14 Details	Pri	38	11	7	20	43	71	40	17th	R16	–	–	Rodri Verza	8
2014–15 Details	Pri	38	8	8	22	35	64	32	19th	R16	–	–	Tomer Hemed	8
2015–16 Details	Seg	42	10	18	14	44	51	48	18th	R16	–	–	Quique González	16
2016–17 Details	Seg	42	14	9	19	44	49	51	15th	2R	–	–	Quique González	16
2017–18 Details	Seg	42	12	12	18	38	45	48	18th	1R	–	–	Rubén Alcaraz	9
2018–19 Details	Seg	42	15	15	12	51	39	60	10th	R32	–	–	**Álvaro Giménez**	20
2019–20 Details	Seg	42	17	13	12	62	43	64	4th	1R	–	–	Darwin Núñez	16
2020–21 Details	Seg	42	21	10	11	61	40	73	4th	QF	–	–	Umar Sadiq	22
2021–22 Details	Seg	42	24	9	9	68	35	81	**1st**	R32	–	–	Umar Sadiq	19
2022–23 Details	Pri	38	11	8	19	49	65	41	17th	1R	–	–	El Bilal Touré	7
2023–24 Details	Pri	38	3	12	23	43	75	21	19th	2R	–	–	Sergio Arribas	9
2024–25 Details	Seg	42	19	12	11	72	55	69	6th	R16	–	–	Luis Suárez	27

== Key ==
- Pld = Matches played
- W = Matches won
- D = Matches drawn
- L = Matches lost
- GF = Goals for
- GA = Goals against
- Pts = Points
- Pos = Final position
- Pri = La Liga
- Seg = Segunda División
- Seg B = Segunda División B
- Ter = Tercera División
- Reg = Regional Leagues
- UC = UEFA Cup
- CL = UEFA Champions League
- n/a = Not applicable
- 1R = Round 1
- 2R = Round 2
- 3R = Round 3
- 4R = Round 4
- R32 = Round of 32
- R16 = Round of 16
- QF = Quarter-finals
- SF = Semi-finals
- RU = Runners-up
- W = Winners

Champions	Runners-up	Promoted	Relegated

Note: bold text indicates a competition won.
Note 2: Where fields are left blank, the club did not participate in a competition that season.

== See also ==
- UD Almería records and statistics
- UD Almería managers
