= 2000–01 Getafe CF season =

Getafe CF
2000–01 season
- President: Felipe González
- Head coach: Juanjo (until December); Manolo Cano (interim); Gonzalo Hurtado (from December)
- Stadium: Coliseum Alfonso Pérez
- Segunda División: 21st (relegated)
- Copa del Rey: Round of 64
- Top goalscorer: League: Maikel (7); All: Maikel (7)
- Biggest defeat: Getafe 0–5 Tenerife

The 2000–01 season was Getafe CF's 18th season in existence and the club's second consecutive season in the top flight of Spanish football. In addition to the domestic league, Getafe CF will participate in this season's edition of the Copa del Rey. The season covers the period from 1 July 2000 to 30 June 2001.

== Competitions ==
=== Overview ===
Competition	First match	Last match	Starting round	Final position	Record							
Competition	First match	Last match	Starting round	Final position	Pld	W	D	L	GF	GA	GD	Win %
Segunda División	2 September 2020	17 June 2001	Matchday 1	21st	42	8	11	23	42	65	−23	19.05
Copa del Rey	13 December 2000		Round of 64	Round of 64	1	0	0	1	0	3	−3	0.00
Total					43	8	11	24	42	68	−26	18.60

Source: Competitions

=== Segunda División ===
==== League table ====
Pos	Team	Pld	W	D	L	GF	GA	GD	Pts	Promotion or relegation
18	Elche	42	10	16	16	45	56	−11	46	
19	Compostela (R)	42	11	12	19	41	65	−24	45	Relegation to Segunda División B
20	Universidad de Las Palmas (R)	42	8	15	19	34	63	−29	39	Relegation to Segunda División B
21	Getafe (R)	42	8	11	23	42	65	−23	35	Relegation to Segunda División B
22	Lleida (R)	42	5	13	24	40	65	−25	28	Relegation to Segunda División B

Rules for classification: 1st points; 2nd head-to-head points; 3rd head-to-head goal difference; 4th head-to-head goals scored; 5th goal difference; 6th number of goals scored; 7th Fair-play points
(R) Relegated

==== Results summary ====
Overall								Home						Away					
Pld	W	D	L	GF	GA	GD	Pts	W	D	L	GF	GA	GD	W	D	L	GF	GA	GD
42	8	11	23	42	65	−23	35	4	5	12	16	27	−11	4	6	11	26	38	−12

==== Results by round ====
Round	1	2	3	4	5	6	7	8	9	10	11	12	13	14	15	16	17	18	19	20	21	22	23	24	25	26	27	28	29	30	31	32	33	34	35	36	37	38	39	40	41	42
Ground	H	A	H	A	H	A	H	A	H	A	H	A	A	H	A	H	A	H	A	H	A	A	H	A	H	A	H	A	H	A	H	A	H	H	A	H	A	H	A	H	A	H
Result	D	W	L	L	D	L	L	D	W	W	D	L	W	L	D	L	D	L	L	W	L	L	D	L	L	D	W	L	L	W	L	L	W	D	D	L	L	L	L	L	D	L
Position	8	8	14	18	16	21	21	19	18	15	16	18	15	17	18	18	18	18	20	20	20	20	20	20	20	20	19	19	20	19	20	20	20	20	19	20	20	20	20	20	21	21

A = Away; H = Home; W = Win; D = Draw; L = Loss

== Matches ==
2 September 2000 1	Getafe	0–0	Córdoba	Getafe
CET (UTC+1)				Stadium: Coliseum Alfonso Pérez

9 September 2000 2	Universidad de Las Palmas	0–1	Getafe	Las Palmas
CET (UTC+1)

17 September 2000 3	Getafe	0–5	Córdoba	Getafe
CET (UTC+1)				Stadium: Coliseum Alfonso Pérez

24 September 2000 4	Extremadura	1–0	Getafe	Almendralejo
CET (UTC+1)

1 October 2000 5	Getafe	0–0	Eibar	Getafe
CET (UTC+1)				Stadium: Coliseum Alfonso Pérez

8 October 2000 6	Murcia	2–1	Getafe	Murcia
CET (UTC+1)

15 October 2000 7	Getafe	1–2	Salamanca	Getafe
CET (UTC+1)				Stadium: Coliseum Alfonso Pérez

22 October 2000 8	Sevilla	1–1	Getafe	Seville
CET (UTC+1)

29 October 2000 9	Getafe	2–1	Lleida	Getafe
CET (UTC+1)				Stadium: Coliseum Alfonso Pérez

1 November 2000 10	Leganés	2–3	Getafe	Leganés
CET (UTC+1)

5 November 2000 11	Getafe	1–1	Albacete	Getafe
CET (UTC+1)				Stadium: Coliseum Alfonso Pérez

12 November 2000 12	Sporting Gijón	3–1	Getafe	Gijón
CET (UTC+1)

19 November 2000 13	Elche	1–4	Getafe	Elche
CET (UTC+1)

26 November 2000 14	Getafe	1–2	Levante	Getafe
CET (UTC+1)				Stadium: Coliseum Alfonso Pérez

2 December 2000 15	Recreativo	0–0	Getafe	Huelva
CET (UTC+1)

9 December 2000 16	Getafe	0–1	Real Jaén	Getafe
CET (UTC+1)				Stadium: Coliseum Alfonso Pérez

17 December 2000 17	Compostela	1–1	Getafe	Santiago de Compostela
CET (UTC+1)				Stadium: Estadio Verónica Boquete de San Lázaro

20 December 2000 18	Getafe	0–2	Real Betis	Getafe
CET (UTC+1)				Stadium: Coliseum Alfonso Pérez

7 January 2001 19	Racing Ferrol	2–1	Getafe	Ferrol
CET (UTC+1)

14 January 2001 20	Getafe	2–1	Badajoz	Getafe
CET (UTC+1)				Stadium: Coliseum Alfonso Pérez

20 January 2001 21	Atlético Madrid	2–1	Getafe	Madrid
CET (UTC+1)

27 January 2001 22	Córdoba	4–1	Getafe	Córdoba
CET (UTC+1)

4 February 2001 23	Getafe	0–0	Universidad de Las Palmas	Getafe
CET (UTC+1)				Stadium: Coliseum Alfonso Pérez

11 February 2001 24	Tenerife	3–0	Getafe	Santa Cruz de Tenerife
CET (UTC+1)

18 February 2001 25	Getafe	0–1	Extremadura	Getafe
CET (UTC+1)				Stadium: Coliseum Alfonso Pérez

24 February 2001 26	Eibar	0–0	Getafe	Eibar
CET (UTC+1)

4 March 2001 27	Getafe	4–0	Murcia	Getafe
CET (UTC+1)				Stadium: Coliseum Alfonso Pérez

11 March 2001 28	Salamanca	4–2	Getafe	Salamanca
CET (UTC+1)

18 March 2001 29	Getafe	0–1	Sevilla	Getafe
CET (UTC+1)				Stadium: Coliseum Alfonso Pérez

25 March 2001 30	Lleida	1–2	Getafe	Lleida
CET (UTC+1)

31 March 2001 31	Getafe	0–1	Leganés	Getafe
CET (UTC+1)				Stadium: Coliseum Alfonso Pérez

8 April 2001 32	Albacete	2–1	Getafe	Albacete
CET (UTC+1)				Stadium: Carlos Belmonte

15 April 2001 33	Getafe	3–1	Sporting Gijón	Getafe
CET (UTC+1)				Stadium: Coliseum Alfonso Pérez

22 April 2001 34	Getafe	1–1	Elche	Getafe
CET (UTC+1)				Stadium: Coliseum Alfonso Pérez

29 April 2001 35	Levante	3–3	Getafe	Valencia
CET (UTC+1)				Stadium: Estadi Ciutat de València

5 May 2001 36	Getafe	0–1	Recreativo	Getafe
CET (UTC+1)				Stadium: Coliseum Alfonso Pérez

13 May 2001 37	Real Jaén	3–1	Getafe	Jaén
CET (UTC+1)				Stadium: Estadio de La Victoria

19 May 2001 38	Getafe	0–3	Compostela	Getafe
CET (UTC+1)				Stadium: Coliseum Alfonso Pérez

27 May 2001 39	Real Betis	1–0	Getafe	Seville
CET (UTC+1)				Stadium: Benito Villamarín

3 June 2001 40	Getafe	1–2	Racing Ferrol	Getafe
CET (UTC+1)				Stadium: Coliseum Alfonso Pérez

10 June 2001 41	Badajoz	2–2	Getafe	Badajoz
CET (UTC+1)				Stadium: Nuevo Vivero

17 June 2001 42	Getafe	0–1	Atlético Madrid	Getafe
CET (UTC+1)				Stadium: Coliseum Alfonso Pérez

=== Copa del Rey ===
13 December 2000 Round of 64	Compostela	3–0	Getafe	Santiago de Compostela
CET (UTC+1)				Stadium: Estadio Verónica Boquete de San Lázaro
