= 2003–04 Getafe CF season =

Getafe CF
2003–04 season
- Owner: Ángel Torres Sánchez
- President: Ángel Torres Sánchez
- Head coach: Josu Uribe
- Segunda División: 2nd (promoted)
- Copa del Rey: Round of 64
- Top goalscorer: League: Míchel (15); All: Míchel (15)

The 2003–04 season was Getafe CF's 21st season in existence as a football club. In addition to the domestic league, the club also competed in the Copa del Rey.

== Pre-season and friendlies ==
Win Draw Loss

7 August 2003 Friendly	Levante (Spain)	0–2	(Spain) Getafe	Spain
21:45 CEST (UTC+2)

== Competitions ==
=== Overall record ===
Competition	First match	Last match	Starting round	Final position	Record							
Competition	First match	Last match	Starting round	Final position	Pld	W	D	L	GF	GA	GD	Win %
Segunda División	31 August 2003	19 June 2004	Matchday 1	2nd	42	20	16	6	55	38	+17	47.62
Copa del Rey	8 October 2003		Round of 64	Round of 64	1	0	0	1	1	2	−1	0.00
Total					43	20	16	7	56	40	+16	46.51

Source: Competitions

=== Segunda División ===
==== League table ====
Pos	Team	Pld	W	D	L	GF	GA	GD	Pts	Promotion or relegation
1	Levante (C, P)	42	22	13	7	59	33	+26	79	Promotion to La Liga
2	Getafe (P)	42	20	16	6	55	38	+17	76 (Note: NUM 0-0 GET; GET 2-1 NUM)	Promotion to La Liga
3	Numancia (P)	42	22	10	10	60	30	+30	76	Promotion to La Liga
4	Alavés	42	20	14	8	48	32	+16	74	
5	Sporting Gijón	42	20	10	12	58	40	+18	70	

Source: LFP - Liga Adelante
Rules for classification: 1st points; 2nd head-to-head points; 3rd head-to-head goal difference; 4th head-to-head goals scored; 5th goal difference; 6th number of goals scored; 7th Fair-play points
(C) Champions; (P) Promoted

==== Results summary ====
Overall								Home						Away					
Pld	W	D	L	GF	GA	GD	Pts	W	D	L	GF	GA	GD	W	D	L	GF	GA	GD
42	20	16	6	55	38	+17	76	12	8	1	33	15	+18	8	8	5	22	23	−1

Source: Segunda División

==== Results by round ====
Round	1	2	3	4	5	6	7	8	9	10	11	12	13	14	15	16	17	18	19	20	21	22	23	24	25	26	27	28	29	30	31	32	33	34	35	36	37	38	39	40	41	42
Ground	A	H	A	H	H	A	H	A	H	A	H	A	H	A	H	A	H	A	H	A	H	H	A	H	A	A	H	A	H	A	H	A	H	A	H	A	H	A	H	A	H	A
Result	W	D	D	W	D	L	D	D	D	D	D	W	D	W	W	D	W	D	D	L	W	L	W	W	L	L	W	L	W	W	W	D	D	D	W	W	W	D	W	W	W	W
Position	2	3	5	3	3	7	7	8	11	11	12	8	10	8	7	8	6	6	6	7	7	7	5	3	4	5	5	5	5	4	4	5	5	5	5	5	5	5	3	2	2	2

Source: Segunda División
A = Away; H = Home; W = Win; D = Draw; L = Loss

==== Matches ====
31 August 2003 1	Sporting Gijón	0–2	Getafe	Gijón
--:-- CEST (UTC+2)				Stadium: El Molinón

7 September 2003 2	Getafe	1–1	Almería	Getafe
--:-- CEST (UTC+2)				Stadium: Coliseum Alfonso Pérez

13 September 2003 3	Málaga B	1–1	Getafe	Málaga
--:-- CEST (UTC+2)				Stadium: La Rosaleda

21 September 2003 4	Getafe	3–2	Cádiz	Getafe
--:-- CEST (UTC+2)				Stadium: Coliseum Alfonso Pérez

27 September 2003 5	Getafe	0–0	Alavés	Getafe
--:-- CEST (UTC+2)				Stadium: Coliseum Alfonso Pérez

5 October 2003 6	Algeciras	3–0	Getafe	Algeciras
--:-- CEST (UTC+2)				Stadium: Nuevo Mirador

13 October 2003 7	Getafe	0–0	Recreativo	Getafe
--:-- CEST (UTC+2)				Stadium: Coliseum Alfonso Pérez

18 October 2003 8	Córdoba	0–0	Getafe	Córdoba
--:-- CEST (UTC+2)				Stadium: Nuevo Arcángel

26 October 2003 9	Getafe	1–1	Salamanca	Getafe
--:-- CEST (UTC+2)				Stadium: Coliseum Alfonso Pérez

1 November 2003 10	Las Palmas	1–1	Getafe	Las Palmas
--:-- CET (UTC+1)				Stadium: Gran Canaria

9 November 2003 11	Getafe	0–0	Levante	Getafe
--:-- CET (UTC+1)				Stadium: Coliseum Alfonso Pérez

16 November 2003 12	Xerez	1–2	Getafe	Jerez de la Frontera
--:-- CET (UTC+1)				Stadium: Chapín

23 November 2003 13	Getafe	1–1	Poli Ejido	Getafe
--:-- CET (UTC+1)				Stadium: Coliseum Alfonso Pérez

29 November 2003 14	Terrassa	1–2	Getafe	Terrassa
--:-- CET (UTC+1)				Stadium: Olímpic de Terrassa

6 December 2003 15	Getafe	3–1	Rayo Vallecano	Getafe
--:-- CET (UTC+1)				Stadium: Coliseum Alfonso Pérez

14 December 2003 16	Elche	1–1	Getafe	Elche
--:-- CET (UTC+1)				Stadium: Manuel Martínez Valero

21 December 2003 17	Getafe	3–1	Leganés	Getafe
--:-- CET (UTC+1)				Stadium: Coliseum Alfonso Pérez

3 January 2004 18	Numancia	0–0	Getafe	Soria
--:-- CET (UTC+1)				Stadium: Los Pajaritos

10 January 2004 19	Getafe	2–2	Ciudad de Murcia	Getafe
--:-- CET (UTC+1)				Stadium: Coliseum Alfonso Pérez

18 January 2004 20	Eibar	2–0	Getafe	Eibar
--:-- CET (UTC+1)				Stadium: Ipurua

24 January 2004 21	Getafe	1–0	Tenerife	Getafe
--:-- CET (UTC+1)				Stadium: Coliseum Alfonso Pérez

1 February 2004 22	Getafe	0–2	Sporting Gijón	Getafe
--:-- CET (UTC+1)				Stadium: Coliseum Alfonso Pérez

8 February 2004 23	Almería	0–1	Getafe	Almería
--:-- CET (UTC+1)				Stadium: Juan Rojas

15 February 2004 24	Getafe	2–1	Málaga B	Getafe
--:-- CET (UTC+1)				Stadium: Coliseum Alfonso Pérez

21 February 2004 25	Cádiz	2–1	Getafe	Cádiz
--:-- CET (UTC+1)				Stadium: Ramón de Carranza

6 March 2004 27	Getafe	3–0	Algeciras	Getafe
--:-- CET (UTC+1)				Stadium: Coliseum Alfonso Pérez

13 March 2004 28	Recreativo	2–0	Getafe	Huelva
--:-- CET (UTC+1)				Stadium: Nuevo Colombino

20 March 2004 29	Getafe	1–0	Córdoba	Getafe
--:-- CET (UTC+1)				Stadium: Coliseum Alfonso Pérez

24 March 2004 26	Alavés	3–0	Getafe	Vitoria-Gasteiz
--:-- CET (UTC+1)				Stadium: Mendizorrotza
Note: The match was originally scheduled for 28 February 2004, but was postponed.

28 March 2004 30	Salamanca	0–1	Getafe	Villares de la Reina
--:-- CET (UTC+1)				Stadium: Helmántico

3 April 2004 31	Getafe	3–0	Las Palmas	Getafe
--:-- CEST (UTC+2)				Stadium: Coliseum Alfonso Pérez

11 April 2004 32	Levante	1–1	Getafe	Valencia
--:-- CEST (UTC+2)				Stadium: Ciutat de València

18 April 2004 33	Getafe	0–0	Xerez	Getafe
--:-- CEST (UTC+2)				Stadium: Coliseum Alfonso Pérez

25 April 2004 34	Poli Ejido	0–0	Getafe	El Ejido
--:-- CEST (UTC+2)				Stadium: Santo Domingo

1 May 2004 35	Getafe	2–0	Terrassa	Getafe
--:-- CEST (UTC+2)				Stadium: Coliseum Alfonso Pérez

8 May 2004 36	Rayo Vallecano	1–2	Getafe	Madrid
--:-- CEST (UTC+2)				Stadium: Teresa Rivero

15 May 2004 37	Getafe	3–1	Elche	Getafe
--:-- CEST (UTC+2)				Stadium: Coliseum Alfonso Pérez

23 May 2004 38	Leganés	0–0	Getafe	Leganés
--:-- CEST (UTC+2)				Stadium: Butarque

30 May 2004 39	Getafe	2–1	Numancia	Getafe
--:-- CEST (UTC+2)				Stadium: Coliseum Alfonso Pérez

5 June 2004 40	Ciudad de Murcia	1–2	Getafe	Murcia
--:-- CEST (UTC+2)				Stadium: La Condomina

13 June 2004 41	Getafe	2–1	Eibar	Getafe
--:-- CEST (UTC+2)				Stadium: Coliseum Alfonso Pérez

19 June 2004 42	Tenerife	3–5	Getafe	Santa Cruz de Tenerife
--:-- CEST (UTC+2)				Stadium: Heliodoro Rodríguez López

=== Copa del Rey ===
8 October 2003 Round of 64	Getafe	1–2	Leganés	Getafe
--:-- CEST (UTC+2)				Stadium: Coliseum Alfonso Pérez

== Statistics ==
=== Goalscorers ===
Rank	No.	Pos	Nat	Name	Segunda División	Copa del Rey	Total
1	7	FW	(Spain)	Míchel	15	0	15
2	17	FW	(Spain)	Sergio Pachón	10	0	10
3	11	FW	(Spain)	Alberto Ruiz	6	0	6
Totals					31	0	31
