= Juan Román =

Juan Román may refer to:

- Juan Grande Román (1546-1600), Spanish Roman Catholic Saint
- Juan Antonio Román (born 1943), Spanish football manager and former footballer
- Juan José Roman (born 1962), Spanish sprint canoeist
- Juan Román Riquelme (born 1978), Argentine footballer
- Cabo Juan Román Airfield, Chilean airport

== See also ==
- Joan Román (born 1993), Spanish footballer
