= Juan Carlos Portillo =

Juan Carlos Portillo may refer to:

- Juan Carlos Portillo (footballer, born 1970), Spanish former footballer
- Juan Carlos Portillo (footballer, born 1991), Salvadoran footballer
- Juan Portillo (born 2000), Argentine footballer
