= Raúl Sánchez =

Raúl Sánchez may refer to:

- Raúl Sánchez (musician) (born 1973), Spanish-born Australian rock musician
- Raúl Sánchez (baseball) (1930–2002), Cuban MLB player
- Raúl Sánchez (footballer, born 1933) (Raúl Pedro Sánchez Soya, 1933–2016), Chilean footballer
- Raúl Sánchez (footballer, born 1976) (Raúl Sánchez Soler), Chilean footballer
- Raúl Sánchez (footballer, born 1997) (Raúl Sánchez Sánchez), Spanish footballer
- Raúl Sánchez Bañados (1929–2013), Chilean metalworker, trade union leader, and politician
- Raúl Sánchez Díaz Martell (1915–2011), governor of Baja California
