= Alfonsín (footballer) =

Spanish footballer and manager

Personal information
- Full name: Alfonso González Fernández
- Date of birth: 16 July 1951 (age 75)
- Place of birth: Cortegana, Spain
- Position: Defender

Youth career
- Sevilla

Senior career*
Years	Team	Apps	(Gls)
- Sevilla Atlético
- AD Almería

Managerial career
- 2000–2002: Almería B
- 2002–2004: Almería (assistant)
- 2004: Almería
- 2005: Almería
- 2007–2008: Almería B
- 2010–2011: Almería B
- * Club domestic league appearances and goals

Alfonso González Fernández (born 16 July 1951), commonly known as Alfonsín, is a Spanish retired footballer who played as a defender, and a manager.

== Football career ==
Born in Cortegana, Huelva, Andalusia, Alfonsín began working as a coach with UD Almería B, being promoted to Tercera División in 2002. On 26 January 2004, he was appointed at the helm of the main squad, replacing fired Casuco.

However, Alfonsín only remained one game in charge, being later replaced by Luis Ángel Duque. After the latter's resignment in April he returned, narrowly avoiding relegation despite finishing 13th.

Alfonsín returned to the Rojiblancos on 29 January 2005, replacing Fernando Castro Santos. After being in charge for five matches, he became Fabri's assistant the following month.

In November 2007, Alfonsín returned to Almería's reserves, still in the fourth level. A third spell befell in the 2010–11 season, and he led them to a comfortable mid-table position in Segunda División B in their first experience.
