= List of UD Almería records and statistics =

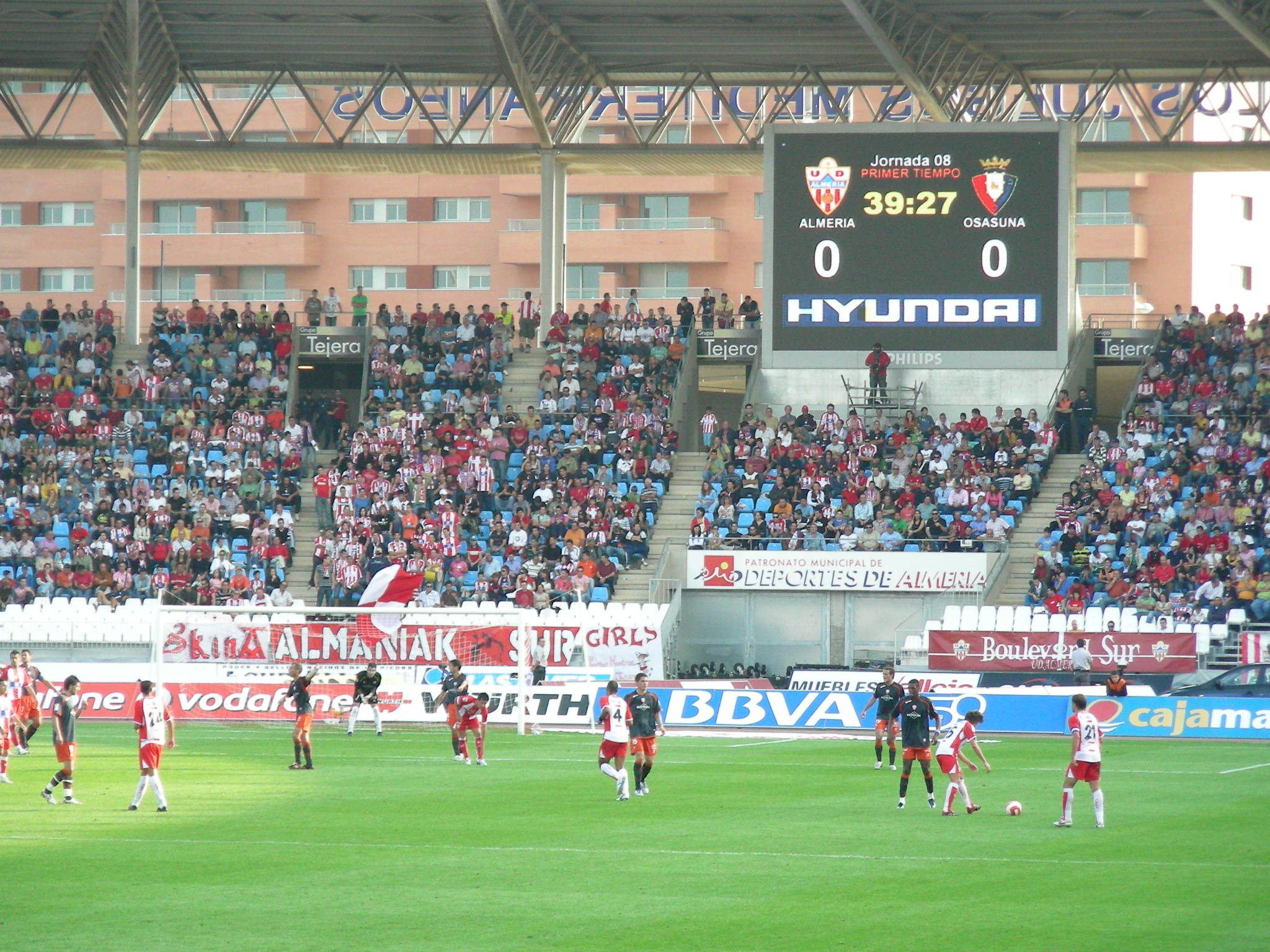
Almería playing against CA Osasuna in 2007, during its first season in La Liga

Unión Deportiva Almería (English: Almería Sports Union), often referred to as just Almería, is a professional football club, based in Almería, Andalusia, Spain.

Founded in 1989 under the name of Almería Club de Fútbol, changed its name to the current one in 2001.

== Honours ==
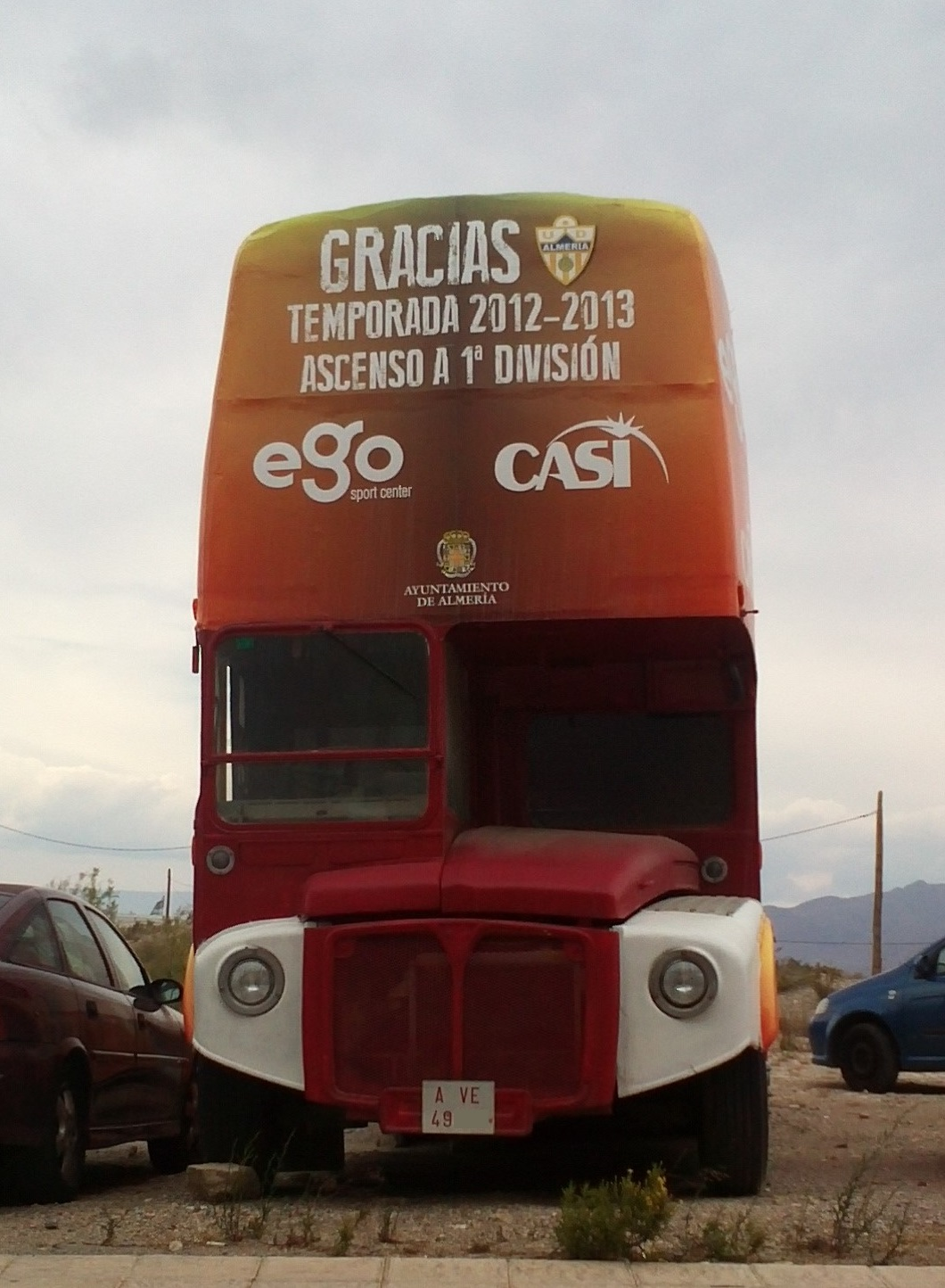
Almería's bus during the promotion campaign in 2013.

UD Almería's only major trophy was the Segunda División title in the 2021–22 campaign. The club's precessor (AD Almería) also won the Segunda División in 1978–79, and won a Segunda División B trophy in the previous season.

=== Regional titles ===
- Trofeo Benéfico UCAM:

- Winners (1):

2014 – (2–1 UCAM Murcia)

- Trofeo Festa d'Elx:

- Winners (2):

2012 – (3–1 Elche)
2015 – (1–0 Elche)

- Trofeo Memorial Juan Rojas:

- Winners (7):

2001 – (2–1 Alicante)
2002 – (1–1 (5–4 p.) Villarreal)
2003 – (5–0 Málaga)
2005 – (2–0 Nacional (Uruguay) )
2008 – (3–1 Betis)
2010 – (2–0 Granada)
2011 – (0–0 (3–1 p.) Villarreal)

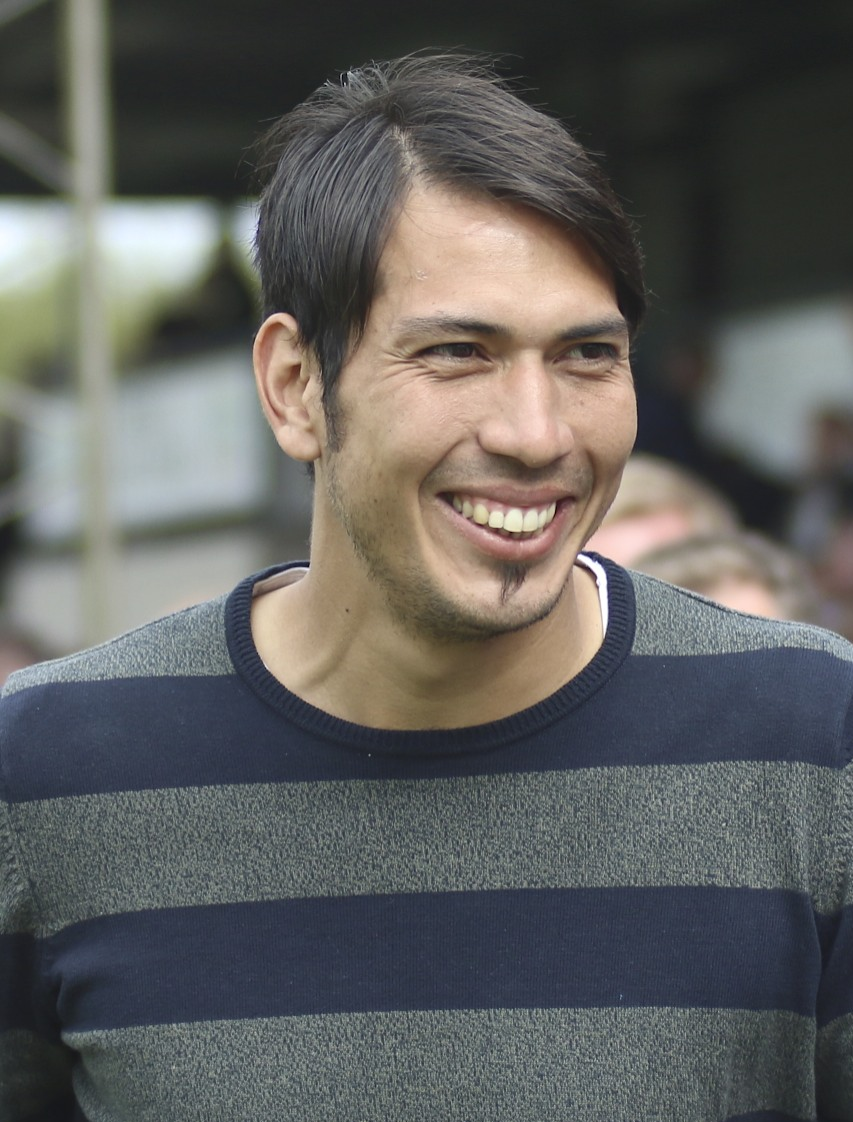
Leonardo Ulloa is Almería's second-best goalscorer, with 48 goals.

- Trofeo Agroponiente:

- Winners (1):

2011 – (3–0 Comarca de Níjar)

- Trofeo Carabela de Plata:

- Winners (1):

2011 – (2–1 Cartagena)

- Trofeo Lagarto de Jaén:

- Winners (1):

2009 – (2–0 Jaén)

- Trofeo Vendimia:

- Winners (1):

2007 – (1–0 Xerez)

- Trofeo Alcalde de Águilas:

- Winners (1):

2007

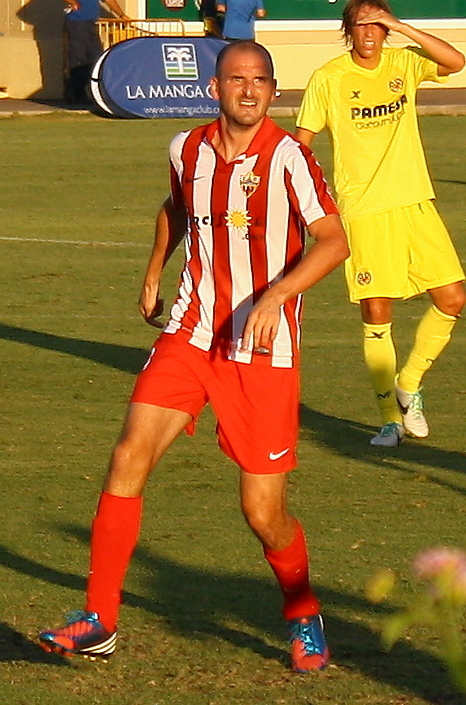
Fernando Soriano, Almería's former player and manager.

- Trofeo Villa de Nerja:

- Winners (1):

2007 – (3–2 Málaga)

- Trofeo Costa Brava:

- Winners (1):

2007

- Trofeo Ciudad de Terrassa:

- Winners (1):

2007

=== National titles ===
- Segunda División:

- Winners (1): 2021–22
- Runners-up (1): 2006–07

- Segunda División B:

- Runners-up (2): 1994–95, 2001–02

- Tercera División:

- Runners-up (1): 1992–93

== Statistics ==
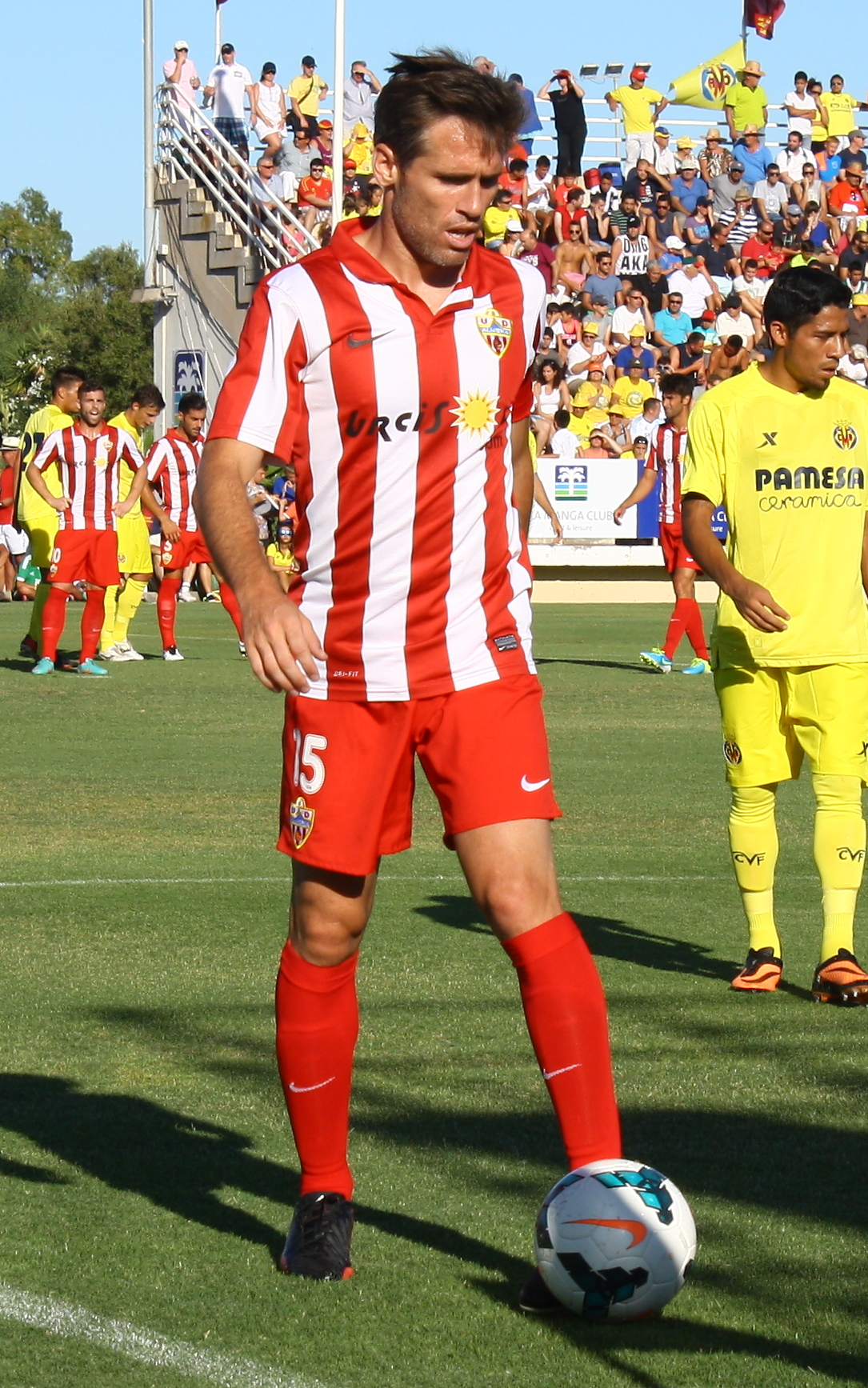
Corona is the second player who most appeared for the Almería, playing in 276 matches.

- Seasons in La Liga: 7
- Best position in La Liga: 8th (2007–08)

Points obtained: 52

- Worst position in La Liga: 20th (2010–11)
- Seasons in Segunda División: 13
- Best position in Segunda División: 1st (2021–22)

Points obtained: 81

- Worst position in Segunda División: 18th (2002–03, 2015–16, 2017–18)
- Most goals scored in a season: 88 (1992–93)
- Most goals scored in a La Liga match:

Home:Almería 3 – Villarreal 0 (4 April 2009), Almería 3 – Mallorca 1 (15 May 2011), Almería 3 – Granada 0 (4 January 2014), Almería 3 – Granada 0 (11 April 2015)
Away:Sevilla 1 – Almería 4 (19 April 2008)

- Most goals conceded in a La Liga match:

Home: Almería 0 – Barcelona 8 (20 November 2010) (Note: It was also La Liga's biggest win from an away team in the whole history.)
Away: Real Madrid 8 – Almería 1 (21 May 2011)

=== Overall seasons table in La Liga ===
Pos.	Club	Season In D1	Pl.	W	D	L	GS	GA	Dif.	Pts	Champion	2nd place	3rd place	4th place
37	Almería	7	266	73	64	129	293	431	-138	283	0	0	0	0

Last updated: 29 September 2023
Pos. = Position; Pl = Match played; W = Win; D = Draw; L = Lost; GS = Goals scored; GA = Goals against; P = Points.
Colors: Gold = winner; Silver = runner-up.

== Milestones ==
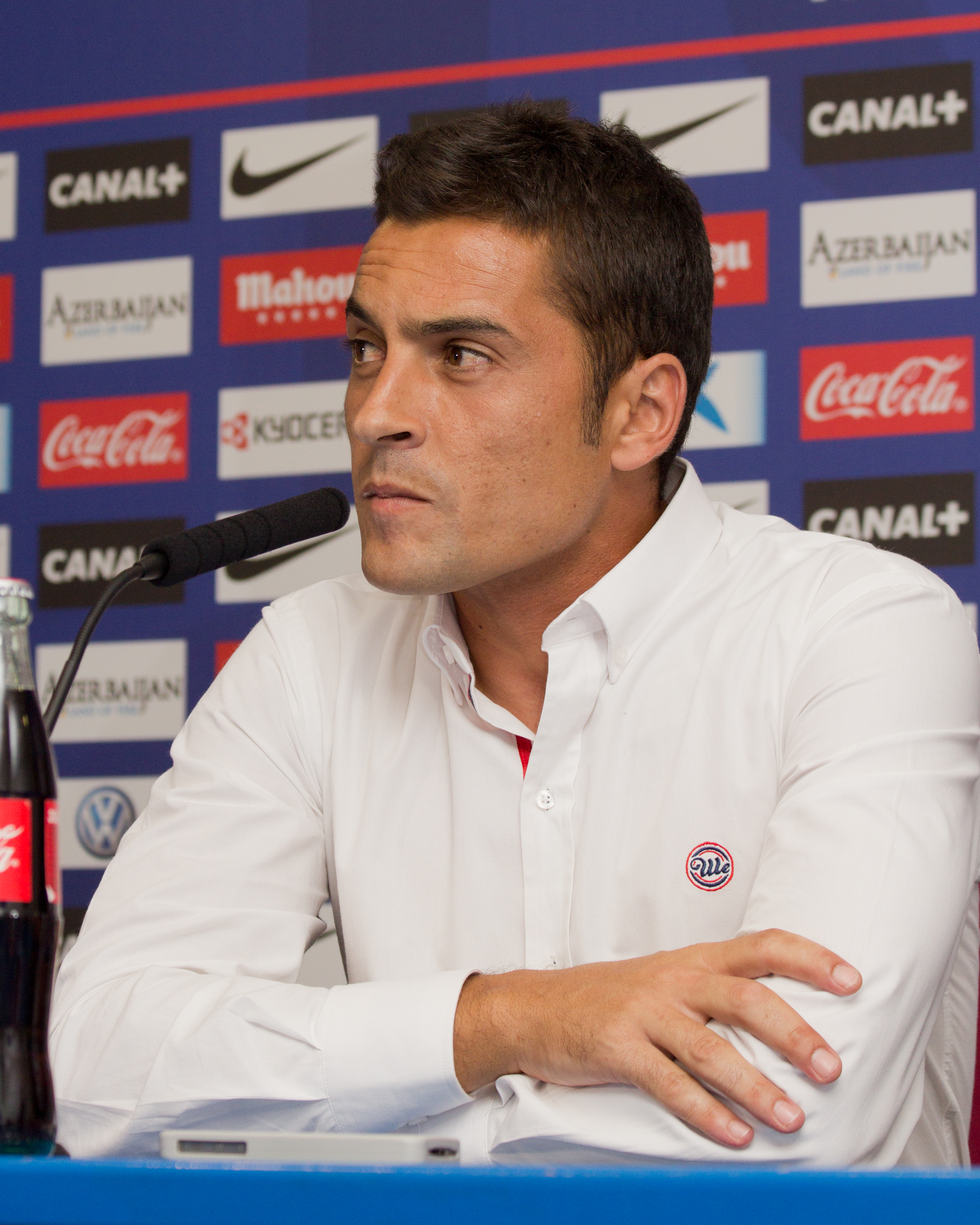
Francisco is Almería's fourth all-time top scorer, with 46 goals.

Players in bold are still playing for the club, and players in italic are still active.

- All-time top scorer: Raúl Sánchez with 57 goals (1997–99, 2000–02)
- Most appearances: José Ortiz with 338 matches (1997–2012)
- Youngest player to debut: Gaspar Panadero, with 16 years and 277 days (against Córdoba CF on 12 September 2014)
- Youngest player to score: Hicham Khaloua, with 18 years and 341 days (against Real Sociedad on 24 March 2014)
- Manager with most consecutive matches in charge: Rubi, with 92 (April 2021–June 2023)

=== Most appearances and goals ===
As of 29 September 2023^{1}

#	Player name	Nat.	Apps
1	José Ortiz	(Spain)	338
2	Corona	(Spain)	333
3	Fernando Soriano	(Spain)	328
4	Santi Acasiete	(Peru)	213
5	Kalu Uche	(Nigeria)	212
5	Albert Crusat	(Spain)	212
7	Carlos García	(Spain)	208
8	Verza	(Spain)	183
9	César de la Hoz	(Spain)	171
10	Ángel Trujillo	(Spain)	163

#	Player name	Nat.	Gls
1	Raúl Sánchez	(Spain)	57
2	Leonardo Ulloa	(Argentina)	48
3	José Ortiz	(Spain)	47
4	Fernando Soriano	(Spain)	46
5	Kalu Uche	(Nigeria)	45
5	Francisco	(Spain)	45
7	Umar Sadiq	(Nigeria)	43
8	Luna	(Spain)	39
9	Albert Crusat	(Spain)	34
9	Manuel Sousa	(Spain)	34

^{1} According to BDFutbol.

=== Milestone goals in La Liga ===
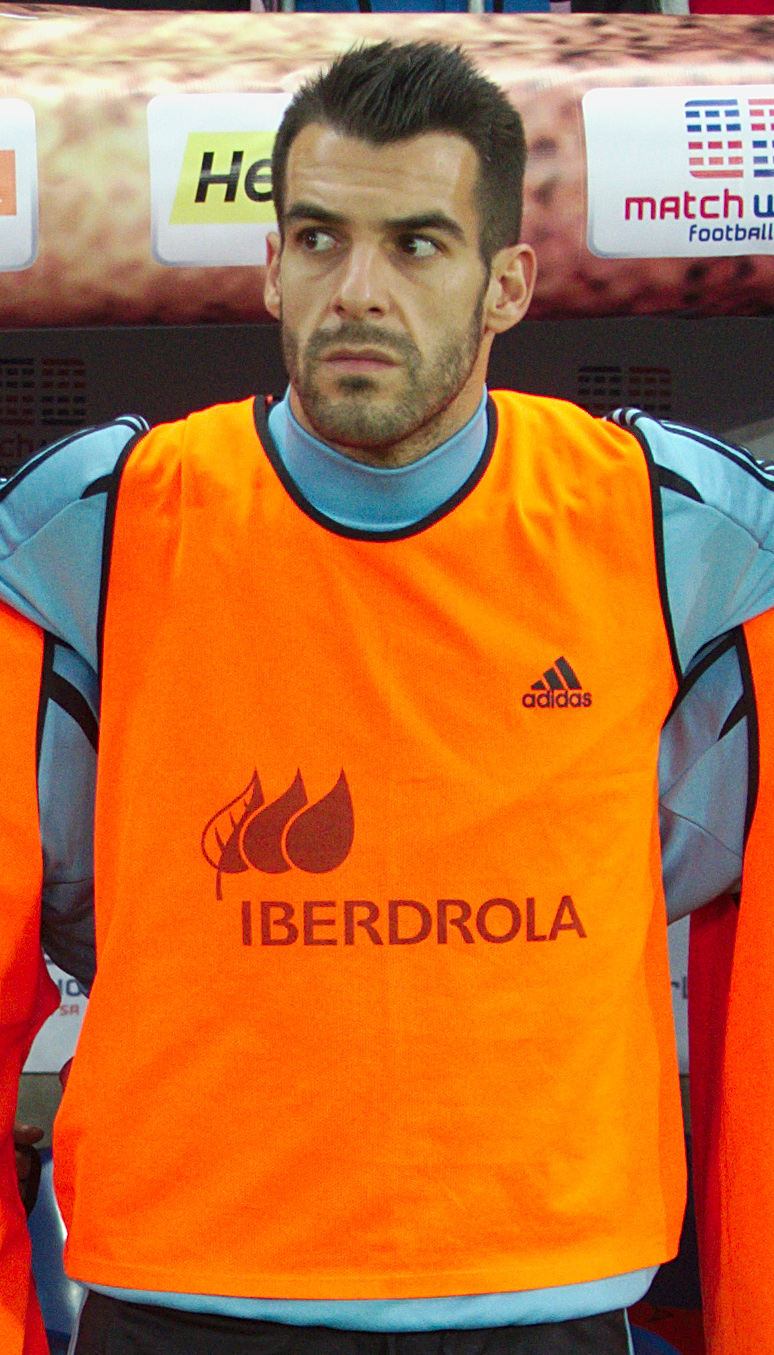
Álvaro Negredo scored Almería's first goal in La Liga, back in 2007. He is also the club's top scorer in the main category, with 32 goals.

Goal Number	Date	Player	Match & result	Scored
1	26 August 2007	(Spain) Álvaro Negredo	Deportivo La Coruña 0 – **UDA** 3	0 – **1**
50	5 October 2008	(Spain) Álvaro Negredo	Getafe 2 – **UDA** 2	2 – **1**
100	5 December 2009	(Spain) Fernando Soriano	Real Madrid 4 – **UDA** 2	1 – **1**
200	20 April 2014	(Spain) Óscar Díaz	**UDA** 2 – Celta Vigo 4	**2** – 4
300	23 September 2023	(Spain) Sergio Arribas	**UDA** 2 – Valencia 2	**2** – 2

== See also ==
- UD Almería seasons
