= Alfonso González (disambiguation) =

Alfonso González may refer to:

- Alfonso González (born 1994), Mexican footballer
- Alfonso González (athlete) (born 1910), Mexican Olympic hurdler
- Alfonso González Fernández (born 1951), Spanish footballer, known as Alfonsín
- Alfonso González Lozano (1856–1912), Spanish politician, native of Lillo, Spain
- Alfonso González Martínez (born 1999), Spanish professional footballer, known as Alfon
- Alfonso González Nieto (born 1978), Spanish motorcycle racer, known as Fonsi Nieto
- Alfonso González Ruiz (born 1959), Mexican politician from Nuevo León
- Alfonso González (tennis), Mexican tennis player
- Alfonso González (wrestler) (born 1945), Panamanian Olympic wrestler
