= Manolo Cano =

Spanish football manager

Personal information
- Full name: Manuel Jesús Cano Martín
- Date of birth: 26 August 1975 (age 51)
- Place of birth: L'Hospitalet, Spain

Team information
- Current team: Atlético Madrid (women) (Manager)

Managerial career
- Years: Team
- Don Bosco
- 1998–2003: Getafe (assistant)
- 2000: Getafe (interim)
- 2003–2004: Badajoz
- 2004–2005: EF Valdemoro
- 2005: Parla
- 2005–2006: Colonia Ofigevi
- 2006–2008: Alcorcón B
- 2008: Alcorcón (interim)
- 2008–2012: Alcorcón (assistant)
- 2012–2013: Granada (assistant)
- 2013–2015: Numancia (assistant)
- 2015: Guadalajara
- 2016–2018: Atlético Madrid (U19)
- 2018–2019: SS Reyes
- 2020–2021: Las Rozas
- 2022: Villanovense
- 2022–2023: Atlético Madrid (women)

Manuel Jesús 'Manolo' Cano Martín (born 26 August 1975) is a Spanish football manager.

== Manager career ==
Born in L'Hospitalet de Llobregat, Barcelona, Catalonia, Cano joined Getafe CF as an assistant in 1998, from Don Bosco CF. In 2000, he was an interim manager during three matches, but subsequently returned to his previous role after his arrival of Gonzalo Hurtado.

On 19 January 2003 Cano was dismissed by Geta along with manager Felines; both also worked together at Badajoz CF. In 2004, he started coaching, being appointed at EF Valdemoro, AD Parla, and CD Colonia Ofigevi, achieving promotion to Tercera División with the latter.

In the 2006 summer Cano was appointed AD Alcorcón B manager. In June 2008, after already being an interim manager for one match, he was named Juan Antonio Anquela's assistant in the main squad. He continued to work with Anquela in the following years, at Granada CF and CD Numancia.

On 3 July 2015 Cano rescinded his contract with the Rojillos, and was immediately appointed at the helm of CD Guadalajara. He was sacked on 13 December, and was named manager of Atlético Madrid's Juvenil A squad the following 29 June.
