= Pepe Cayuela =

Spanish football manager (born 1950)

Personal information
- Full name: José Cayuela Ruiz
- Date of birth: 8 October 1950 (age 76)
- Place of birth: Fuengirola, Spain

Senior career*
Years	Team	Apps	(Gls)
- San Félix

Managerial career
- San Félix
- Los Olivos
- Puerto Malagueño
- El Palo
- Los Boliches
- Fuengirola
- San Pedro
- Vélez
- 1992–1993: Almería
- 1995: Almería
- 1996: Almería
- 1996: Málaga
- 1997: Poli Almería
- * Club domestic league appearances and goals

José "Pepe" Cayuela Ruiz (born 8 October 1950) is a Spanish football manager.

== Managerial career ==
Born in Fuengirola, Málaga, Andalusia, Cayuela made his managerial debut with CD San Félix, a club he already represented as a player. He subsequently spent two decades managing lower league clubs in his native region.

In the 1992 summer Cayuela was appointed UD Almería manager, after a stint at Vélez CF. He was also in charge of the Rojiblancos in two further occasions (1995 and 1996), achieving promotion from Segunda División B in one of them and narrowly avoiding relegation from Segunda División in the other.

In June 1996 Cayuela was named manager of Málaga CF in the third level, being dismissed only five months after. He was also appointed at the helm of Polideportivo Almería in 1997, but stepped down due to health issues.
