= 2005–06 UD Almería season =

UD Almería
2005–06 season
- President: Alfonso Garcia Gabarron
- Head coach: Paco Flores
- Stadium: Estadio de los Juegos Mediterráneos
- Segunda División: 6th
- Copa del Rey: First round

The 2005–06 season was the 17th season in the history of UD Almería and the club's fourth consecutive season in the second division of Spanish football. In addition to the domestic league, UD Almería participated in this season's edition of the Copa del Rey.

== Competitions ==
=== Overall record ===
Competition	First match	Last match	Starting round	Final position	Record							
Competition	First match	Last match	Starting round	Final position	Pld	W	D	L	GF	GA	GD	Win %
Segunda División	28 August 2005	17 June 2006	Matchday 1	8th	42	20	7	15	54	43	+11	47.62
Copa del Rey	31 August 2005		First round	First round	1	0	1	0	0	0	+0	0.00
Total					43	20	8	15	54	43	+11	46.51

Source: BDFutbol

=== Segunda División ===
==== League table ====
Pos	Team	Pld	W	D	L	GF	GA	GD	Pts
4	Ciudad de Murcia	42	20	12	10	53	42	+11	72
5	Lorca Deportiva	42	19	12	11	56	39	+17	69
6	Almería	42	20	7	15	54	43	+11	67 (Note: ALM 3–0 XER; XER 0–0 ALM)
7	Xerez	42	18	13	11	60	46	+14	67
8	Numancia	42	18	9	15	50	55	−5	63

Source: BDFutbol
Rules for classification: 1st points; 2nd head-to-head points; 3rd head-to-head goal difference; 4th head-to-head goals scored; 5th goal difference; 6th number of goals scored; 7th Fair-play points

==== Results summary ====
Overall								Home						Away					
Pld	W	D	L	GF	GA	GD	Pts	W	D	L	GF	GA	GD	W	D	L	GF	GA	GD
42	20	7	15	54	43	+11	67	16	1	4	40	17	+23	4	6	11	14	26	−12

Source: BDFutbol

==== Results by round ====
Round	1	2	3	4	5	6	7	8	9	10	11	12	13	14	15	16	17	18	19	20	21	22	23	24	25	26	27	28	29	30	31	32	33	34	35	36	37	38	39	40	41	42
Ground	A	H	A	H	A	H	A	H	A	H	A	H	A	H	A	H	A	H	A	A	H	H	A	H	A	H	A	H	A	H	A	H	A	H	A	H	A	H	A	H	H	A
Result	L	W	D	W	L	W	L	D	D	W	W	W	D	W	L	L	L	W	W	L	W	L	D	W	D	W	L	W	W	W	W	L	D	W	L	L	L	W	L	W	W	L
Position	22	10	13	7	11	6	11	11	12	9	7	4	4	3	4	7	7	6	3	4	5	6	7	6	6	6	6	6	6	3	3	3	3	3	4	5	6	6	6	6	6	6

Source: BDFutbol
A = Away; H = Home; W = Win; D = Draw; L = Loss

==== Matches ====
28 August 2005 1	Numancia	3–0	Almería	Soria
--:-- CEST (UTC+2)

4 September 2005 2	Almería	3–0	Xerez	Almería
--:-- CEST (UTC+2)

10 September 2005 3	Hércules	2–2	Almería	Alicante
--:-- CEST (UTC+2)

17 September 2005 4	Almería	1–0	Ciudad de Murcia	Almería
--:-- CEST (UTC+2)

25 September 2005 5	Tenerife	2–1	Almería	Santa Cruz de Tenerife
--:-- CEST (UTC+2)

2 October 2005 6	Almería	3–0	Sporting Gijón	Almería
--:-- CEST (UTC+2)

9 October 2005 7	Valladolid	1–0	Almería	Valladolid
--:-- CEST (UTC+2)

11 March 2006 28	Almería	2–1	Valladolid	Almería
--:-- CEST (UTC+2)

19 March 2006 29	Eibar	0–1	Almería	Eibar
--:-- CEST (UTC+2)

25 March 2006 30	Almería	1–0	Lorca Deportiva	Almería
--:-- CEST (UTC+2)

2 April 2006 31	Levante	2–4	Almería	Valencia
--:-- CEST (UTC+2)

9 April 2006 32	Almería	1–2	Poli Ejido	Almería
--:-- CEST (UTC+2)

16 April 2006 33	Racing de Ferrol	1–1	Almería	Ferrol
--:-- CEST (UTC+2)

23 April 2006 34	Almería	2–0	Elche	Almería
--:-- CEST (UTC+2)

29 April 2006 35	Murcia	1–0	Almería	Murcia
--:-- CEST (UTC+2)

6 May 2006 36	Almería	1–2	Albacete	Almería
--:-- CEST (UTC+2)

14 May 2006 37	Gimnàstic de Tarragona	1–0	Almería	Tarragona
--:-- CEST (UTC+2)

21 May 2006 38	Almería	2–1	Recreativo	Almería
--:-- CEST (UTC+2)

27 May 2006 39	Málaga B	3–1	Almería	Málaga
--:-- CEST (UTC+2)

4 June 2006 40	Almería	3–2	Real Madrid Castilla	Almería
--:-- CEST (UTC+2)

11 June 2006 41	Almería	3–1	Lleida	Almería
--:-- CEST (UTC+2)

17 June 2006 42	Castellón	2–0	Almería	Castellón de la Plana
--:-- CEST (UTC+2)

=== Copa del Rey ===
31 August 2005 First round	Almería	0–0 (1–3 p)	Numancia	Almería
--:-- CEST (UTC+2)				Stadium: Estadio de los Juegos Mediterráneos
