= Antonio Belmonte =

Spanish footballer and manager (1953–2020)

Personal information
- Full name: Juan Antonio Belmonte Domínguez
- Date of birth: 29 January 1953
- Place of birth: Almería, Spain
- Date of death: 5 September 2020 (aged 67)
- Place of death: Almería, Spain
- Position: Forward

Youth career
- Arenas
- Pavía
- Real Madrid

Senior career*
| Years | Team | Apps | (Gls) |
| 1971–1980 | Real Madrid Aficionados | | |
| 1972–1973 | → Gimnàstic (loan) | 4 | (0) |
| 1973–1976 | → AD Almería (loan) | | |
| 1976–1977 | → Algeciras (loan) | | |
| 1977–1978 | → Calvo Sotelo (loan) | 34 | (5) |
| 1978–1980 | → Tenerife (loan) | 63 | (11) |
| 1980–1981 | Lorca Deportiva | | |
| 1981–1982 | Gandía | | |
| 1982–1983 | Poli Ejido | | |
| 1983–1984 | Poli Almería | | |
| 1984–1985 | Baza | | |
| Total | | 101 | (16) |

Managerial career
- Pavía
- Campohermoso
- 1990: Almería CF
- Poli Almería
- * Club domestic league appearances and goals

Juan Antonio Belmonte Domínguez (29 January 1953 — 5 September 2020) was a Spanish former footballer and manager. He played as a forward.

== Career ==
Born in Almería, Andalusia, Belmonte joined Real Madrid's youth setup from UD Pavía. After winning the 1971 Copa del Generalísimo Juvenil, he made his senior debut with the Aficionados team before joining Segunda División side Gimnàstic de Tarragona on loan in 1972.

After struggling with injuries, Belmonte made his professional debut on 18 February 1973, starting in a 0–1 away loss against Elche CF. After only three further matches, he was loaned to Tercera División side AD Almería, where he featured regularly.

Belmonte subsequently served loans to Algeciras CF, CD Calvo Sotelo and CD Tenerife, leaving Real Madrid in 1980. He subsequently represented CF Lorca Deportiva, CF Gandía and Polideportivo Ejido before joining newly-formed side CP Almería in 1983; he also scored the latter's first goal of their history.

After helping Poli Almería in their promotion to the fourth division, Belmonte moved to CD Baza, where he retired. He subsequently became a manager, and worked at his former sides Pavía and Pol Almería, aside from CD Campohermoso and Almería CF.

== Death ==
Belmonte died at the age of 67 on 5 September 2020, in his hometown.
