= Puerto Lucia =

Hamlet in Andalusia, Spain

- Hamlet
- Interactive map of Puerto Lucia
- Country: Spain
- Autonomous community: Andalusia
- Province: Huelva
- Municipality: Cortegana
- Elevation: 630 m (2,070 ft)

Population
  - Total: 40
- Time zone: UTC+1 (CET)
  - Summer (DST): UTC+2 (CEST)

Puerto Lucia, also spelled as Puerto Lucía, is a hamlet belonging to the town of Cortegana, in the province of Huelva, Andalucia, Spain. It has a population of only 40 people.

== Etymology ==
The name 'Puerto Lucia' means 'port of Lucia' in Spanish language.

== Geography ==
It is 630 metres above sea level. It is set in the Sierra Morena, about 40 km from the border with Portugal. Its climate is mixed Mediterranean or Atlantic with winter lows of -5 °C and summer highs of 45 °C.

The river, Barranco de Búho is just beside the hamlet.

== Economy ==
Its main source of income is Iberian ham or Jamon, cork and rural tourism.

== See also ==
- List of municipalities in Huelva
