= Pepe Navarro (football manager) =

Spanish football manager

Personal information
- Full name: José Matías Navarro González
- Date of birth: 16 June 1950 (age 76)
- Place of birth: Almería, Spain

Managerial career
- Years: Team
- 1989–1990: Almería
- 1990–1991: Almería
- 1996: Almería
- 1998: Almería
- 2005–2006: Los Molinos
- 2006–2008: Ciudad Vícar
- 2008–2009: San Isidro
- 2009–2014: Los Molinos
- 2014–2015: Atlético Roquetas

José Matías "Pepe" Navarro González (born 16 June 1950) is a Spanish football manager.

== Managerial career ==
Born in Almería, Andalusia, Navarro was the first manager of newly formed Almería CF, managing the club in four occasions and in three different divisions (regional leagues, Segunda División and Segunda División B, respectively). He also had several spells in the club's staff.

Navarro subsequently resumed his career in the lower leagues, managing Los Molinos CF (two stints), CD Ciudad de Vícar and CD San Isidro.
