= Cortegana =

Town and municipality in Huelva, Spain

Coordinates: 37°54′N 6°49′W

- Interactive map of Cortegana
- Country: Spain
- Autonomous community: Andalusia
- Province: Huelva
- Time zone: UTC+1 (CET)
  - Summer (DST): UTC+2 (CEST)

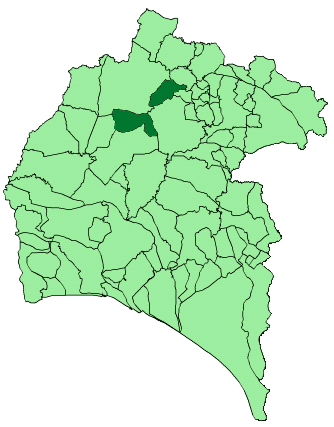
Map of Cortegana, Huelva

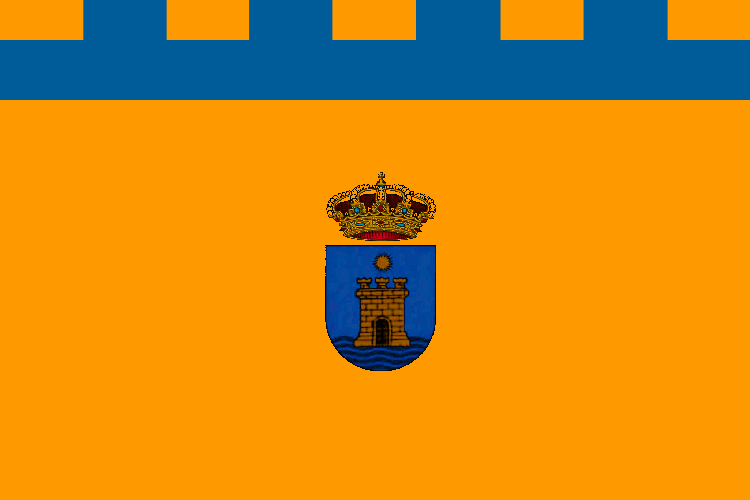
Cortegana's flag

Cortegana's coat of arms

Cortegana Spanish pronunciation: [koɾteˈɣana] is a town and municipality located in the province of Huelva, Spain. According to the 2005 census, the city has a population of 4,952 inhabitants.

== Localities ==
- Puerto Lucia

== See also ==
- List of municipalities in Huelva
