= Casuco =

Spanish football player and manager (born 1955)

Personal information
- Full name: Juan Manuel Martínez Martínez
- Date of birth: 26 September 1955 (age 71)
- Place of birth: Lorca, Spain
- Height: 1.86 m (6 ft 1 in)
- Position: Right back

Youth career
- 1970–1972: Águilas CF
- 1972–1974: Real Madrid

Senior career*
Years	Team	Apps	(Gls)
1974–1976	Lorca Deportiva		
1976–1977	Granada	13	(1)
1977–1979	Elche	64	(1)
1979–1988	Zaragoza	297	(2)
1988–1989	Alzira	19	(0)
1989–1990	Orihuela	12	(0)
1990–1991	Lorca Deportiva		
Total		405	(3)

Managerial career
- 1991–1993: Águilas CF
- 1994–1995: Lorca CF
- 1995–1996: Las Palas
- 1996: Toledo
- 1997–1998: Plasencia
- 1998: Águilas CF
- 1999–2000: Segoviana
- 2000–2004: Almería
- 2005–2006: Murcia
- 2006–2007: Tenerife
- 2007–2008: Xerez
- 2010–2011: Castellón
- 2013–2015: Águilas FC
- * Club domestic league appearances and goals

Juan Manuel Martínez Martínez (born 26 September 1955), commonly known as Casuco, is a Spanish former football right back and manager.

== Playing career ==
Born in Lorca, Region of Murcia, Casuco spent most of his career at Real Zaragoza, playing more than 320 competitive matches. In 1986, he won the Copa del Rey with his main club.

Casuco also represented Elche CF in La Liga, being relegated at the end of the 1977–78 season after starting in all his 27 appearances.

== Coaching career ==
Casuco started working as a manager in 1994. At the professional level, he worked in Segunda División with CD Toledo, UD Almería, Real Murcia, CD Tenerife and Xerez CD.

== Honours ==
Zaragoza

- Copa del Rey: 1985–86
