= Míchel (footballer, born August 1977) =

Spanish footballer and manager

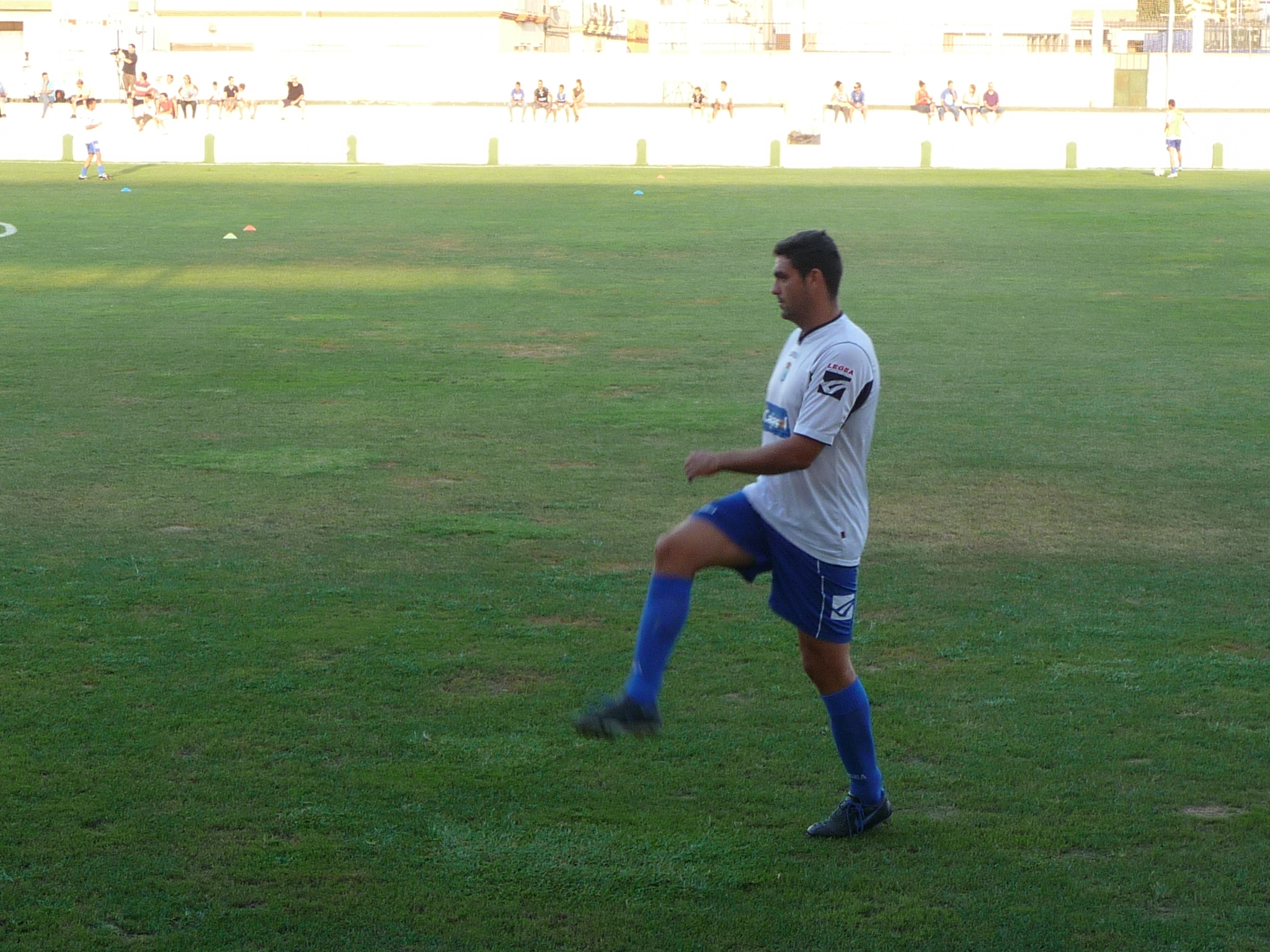
- Míchel training with Xerez in 2009

Personal information
- Full name: Miguel Ángel Carrilero González
- Date of birth: 3 August 1977 (age 49)
- Place of birth: Madrid, Spain
- Height: 1.92 m (6 ft 4 in)
- Position: Forward

Senior career*
Years	Team	Apps	(Gls)
1996–1997	Conquense		
1997	Penafiel	7	(3)
1997–1998	Rayo Vallecano B	30	(13)
1998–2002	Rayo Vallecano	63	(10)
2000–2001	→ Sevilla (loan)	26	(7)
2001–2002	→ Sporting Gijón (loan)	33	(5)
2003–2005	Getafe	67	(22)
2005–2007	Almería	61	(17)
2007–2010	Xerez	43	(5)
2010–2011	Guadalajara	14	(4)
2011–2013	Móstoles		
Total		344	(86)

Managerial career
- 2014−2016: Móstoles
- 2020: Sant Rafel
- 2020−2021: Manchego Ciudad Real
- * Club domestic league appearances and goals

Miguel Ángel Carrilero González (born 3 August 1977), known as Míchel, is a Spanish retired footballer who played as a forward, currently a manager.

In a 15-year professional career, he appeared in 231 Segunda División games over ten seasons (58 goals) in representation of six teams, adding 62 matches and eight goals in La Liga.

== Career ==
Born in Madrid, Míchel first appeared professionally for UB Conquense (Segunda División B). In late 1997, after a very brief spell in Portugal with F.C. Penafiel, he moved to Rayo Vallecano, where he made his La Liga debut in the 1999–2000 season.

Míchel returned to Rayo three years later, after two loans in the Segunda División: with Sevilla FC, he was a very important attacking unit in a 2001 promotion after a one-year absence. The following campaign, he represented Sporting de Gijón.

After leaving the capital outskirts club in December 2002, scoring only once over two top-flight campaigns, Míchel finished team top scorer in the following two seasons in division two, with Getafe CF (15 goals) and UD Almería (12), as both achieved first-ever promotions to the top tier. In 2004–05 he played mainly as a substitute for the former – also from Madrid – netting twice in a rare start, a 2–0 home win against Real Sociedad on 8 May 2005.

For 2007–08, Míchel stayed in the second division, joining Xerez CD and playing mostly as backup to veteran Yordi, who won the Pichichi for the season. The following campaign they too reached the top division for the first time, but he only contributed three matches in less than 100 minutes of play.

In July 2010, after having made 14 appearances in Xerez's top-tier season, which ended in immediate relegation, scoring in home victories over Real Valladolid (3–0) and Real Zaragoza (3–2), the 33-year-old returned to division three, signing for CD Guadalajara.
