= Cabo Juan Román Airfield =

Airport in Chile

Cabo Juan Román Airport Cabo 1° Juan Román Airport
- IATA: WPA; ICAO: SCAS

Summary
- Airport type: Public
- Serves: Puerto Aysén, Chile
- Elevation AMSL: 32 ft / 10 m
- Coordinates: 45°23′56″S 72°40′10″W

Map
- Location of Cabo Juan Román Airport in Chile

Runways
Direction	Length		Surface
Direction	m	ft	Surface
07/25	1,300	4,265	Asphalt
- Source: Landings.com Google Maps GCM

Cabo Juan Román Airport (Spanish: Aeródromo Cabo Juan Román, IATA: WPA, ICAO: SCAS) is an airport serving Puerto Aysén, a city at the head of the Aysén Fjord in the Aysén Region of Chile.

The runway is on the east side of the city, alongside the Aysén River. There is mountainous terrain in all quadrants, with nearby hills south and west.

== See also ==
- Transport in Chile
- List of airports in Chile
