= Juan Carlos Portillo (footballer, born 1970) =

Spanish footballer

Personal information
- Full name: Juan Carlos Portillo González
- Date of birth: 7 July 1970 (age 56)
- Place of birth: Málaga, Spain
- Height: 1.79 m (5 ft 10 in)
- Position: Midfielder

Senior career*
Years	Team	Apps	(Gls)
- Linense
1993–1994	Levante	34	(10)
1994–1999	Almería	127	(6)
- * Club domestic league appearances and goals

Juan Carlos Portillo González (born 7 July 1970) is a Spanish retired footballer who played as a midfielder.

== Club career ==
Born in Málaga, Andalusia, Portillo joined Levante UD in 1993 after a spell at Real Balompédica Linense. In the 1994 summer he signed for UD Almería also in Segunda División B, winning promotion in his first season.

Portillo appeared in his first match as a professional on 3 September 1995, starting and being sent off in a 1–1 home draw against CD Leganés in the Segunda División. He scored his first goal in the category on 2 November of the following year, netting his team's first in a 2–1 home win over RCD Mallorca.

After being relegated in 1997, Portillo stayed two more years with the Rojiblancos, dropping another level in 1999.
