= Juan Antonio Román =

Spanish footballer and manager (1942–2025)

Personal information
- Full name: Juan Antonio Román Castillo
- Date of birth: 18 September 1942
- Place of birth: Almería, Spain
- Date of death: 22 January 2025 (aged 82)
- Position: Winger

Senior career*
Years	Team	Apps	(Gls)
- Hispania
- Cádiz B
1963–1965	Granada	38	(12)
1965–1967	Sevilla	38	(2)
1967–1970	Valladolid	77	(12)
1970–1971	Salamanca		
1971–1973	Cartagena		
Total		153	(26)

Managerial career
- 1977–1978: San Fernando
- 1978–1980: Poli Almería
- 1985–1988: Linense
- 1993–1994: Almería
- 1994: Poli Ejido
- 1995–1996: Poli Almería
- 1997–1998: Poli Almería
- * Club domestic league appearances and goals

Juan Antonio Román Castillo (18 September 1942 – 22 January 2025) was a Spanish footballer who played as a winger and later a manager. He died on 22 January 2025, at the age of 82.
