= Gonzalo Hurtado =

Spanish football manager

Personal information
- Full name: Gonzalo Hurtado de Guinea
- Date of birth: 27 January 1948 (age 78)
- Place of birth: Madrid, Spain

Managerial career
- Years: Team
- 1981–1983: Móstoles
- 1983–1988: Rayo Majadahonda
- 1988–1989: Tomelloso
- 1989–1991: Atlético B
- 1992–1996: Toledo
- 1996: Almería
- 1998–1999: Castellón
- 1999–2000: Murcia
- 2000–2001: Getafe
- 2003–2004: Atlético Madrid (assistant)
- 2006–2010: Mallorca (assistant)
- 2010–2011: Sevilla (assistant)

Gonzalo Hurtado de Guinea (born 27 January 1948) is a Spanish football manager.

== Managerial career ==
Born in Madrid, Hurtado began his managerial career in CF Rayo Majadahonda, and moved to Tomelloso CF in 1988. In the following year he was appointed Atlético Madrid B manager, remaining in charge until 1991.

In the 1992 summer Hurtado was named CD Toledo manager. He led the club to the promotion from Segunda División B in his first season and also managed to finish fourth in his second, only missing out a second successive promotion in the play-offs.

In 1996 Hurtado was appointed at the helm of fellow league team UD Almería. After only having two league wins in 11 games, he was relieved from his duties.

Hurtado was appointed at CD Castellón in 1998, finishing only ninth in the campaign. He was named Real Murcia manager in the following year, and led the club to its Segunda División return after a six-year absence.

In late December 2000 Hurtado was appointed Getafe CF manager, and left the club in the end of the season, after suffering team relegation. In 2003, he became Gregorio Manzano's assistant at Atlético Madrid, and maintained his role at RCD Mallorca and Sevilla FC.
