= South Madrid derby =

Spanish football rivalry

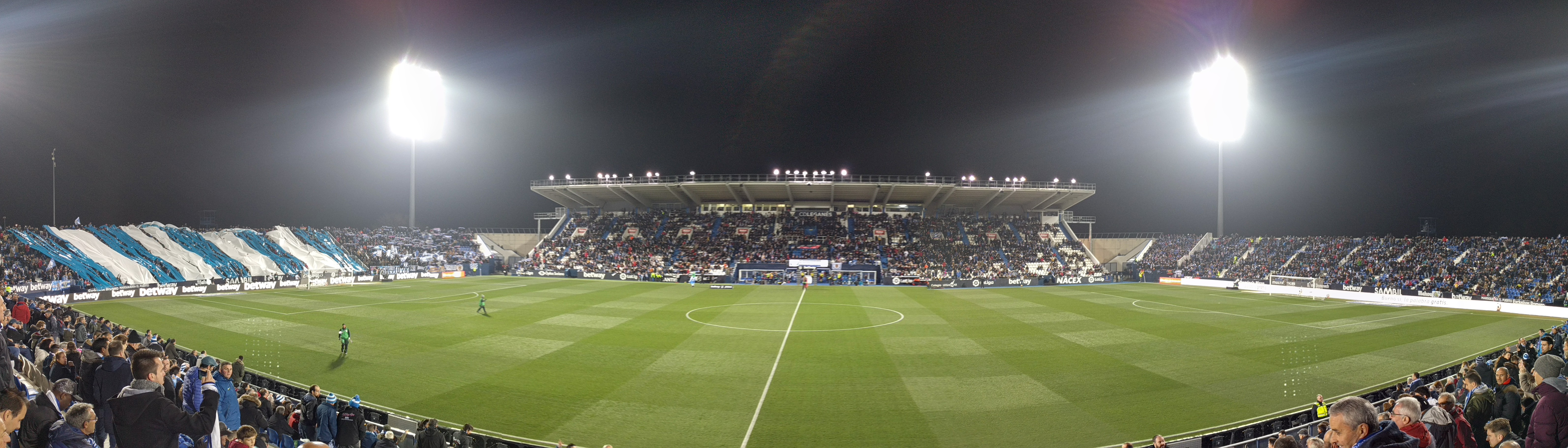
- Derby at Butarque, played in 2018
- Location: Community of Madrid
- Teams: Getafe CF; CD Leganés
- Latest meeting: Leganés 1–0 Getafe; La Liga (2 March 2025)
- Stadiums: Estadio Coliseum (Getafe); Butarque (Leganés)

Statistics
- Total meetings: 36 matches
- Most wins: Leganés (14 matches)

The South Madrid derby (Spanish: Derbi del sur de Madrid), is the name given to any association football match contested between Getafe CF and CD Leganés, the two biggest teams in the south of the Community of Madrid.

== History ==
Getafe and Leganés are two of the biggest cities in the south of the Community of Madrid and developed since the 1920s a strong rivalry, that started when both teams played in the regional leagues and Getafe's team was Getafe Deportivo.

Despite surely coincided in the 1920s and in the 1930s, the first registered official match was played on 25 April 1948, in the final of the Segunda Regional Ordinaria (seventh tier), and Getafe Deportivo defeated Leganés by 1–4.

The rivalry became stronger in the 1980s and in the 1990s, now with Getafe CF founded after the dissolution of Getafe Deportivo. Both teams played together in Segunda División B and Segunda División, leaving the derbies from Tercera División to the Regional leagues in the past.

In 2017, both Getafe and Leganés met for the first time ever in La Liga, reviving the rivalry and becoming the first derby in Spanish football history that had been played in every division of Spanish football.

== Head-to-head statistics ==
This table only includes matches between CD Leganés and Getafe CF, founded in 1983.

Competition	GP	GET	D	LEG	GG	LG
La Liga	6	3	3	1	9	5
Segunda División	12	4	2	6	13	15
Segunda División B	12	2	6	4	10	12
Tercera División	2	1	0	1	4	4
Copa del Rey	3	2	0	1	5	3
Total in all games	35	12	11	13	41	39

== All-time results ==
=== La Liga ===
#	Season	Date	R.	Home team	Score	Away team	Att.	Getafe scorers	Leganés scorers
1	2017–18	8 September 2017	3	Leganés	1 – 2	Getafe	11,454	Arambarri (39), Jiménez (83)	Guerrero (65)
2	2017–18	4 February 2018	22	Getafe	0 – 0	Leganés	10,657		
3	2018–19	7 December 2018	15	Leganés	1 – 1	Getafe	11,327	Cabrera (39)	Nyom (64)
4	2018–19	30 March 2019	29	Getafe	0 – 2	Leganés	12,705		Santos (49), Juanfran (83)
5	2019–20	19 October 2019	9	Getafe	2 – 0	Leganés	13,018	Ángel (64, 84)	
6	2019–20	17 January 2020	20	Leganés	0 – 3	Getafe	11,189	Cabrera (12), Nyom (21), Mata (33)	
7	2024–25	22 September 2024	6	Getafe	1 – 1	Leganés	13,060	Mayoral (83)	Sáenz (76)
8	2024–25	2 March 2025	26	Leganés	1 – 0	Getafe	10.311		Diego García (90+2)
