= Francisco (footballer, born 1978) =

Spanish football manager

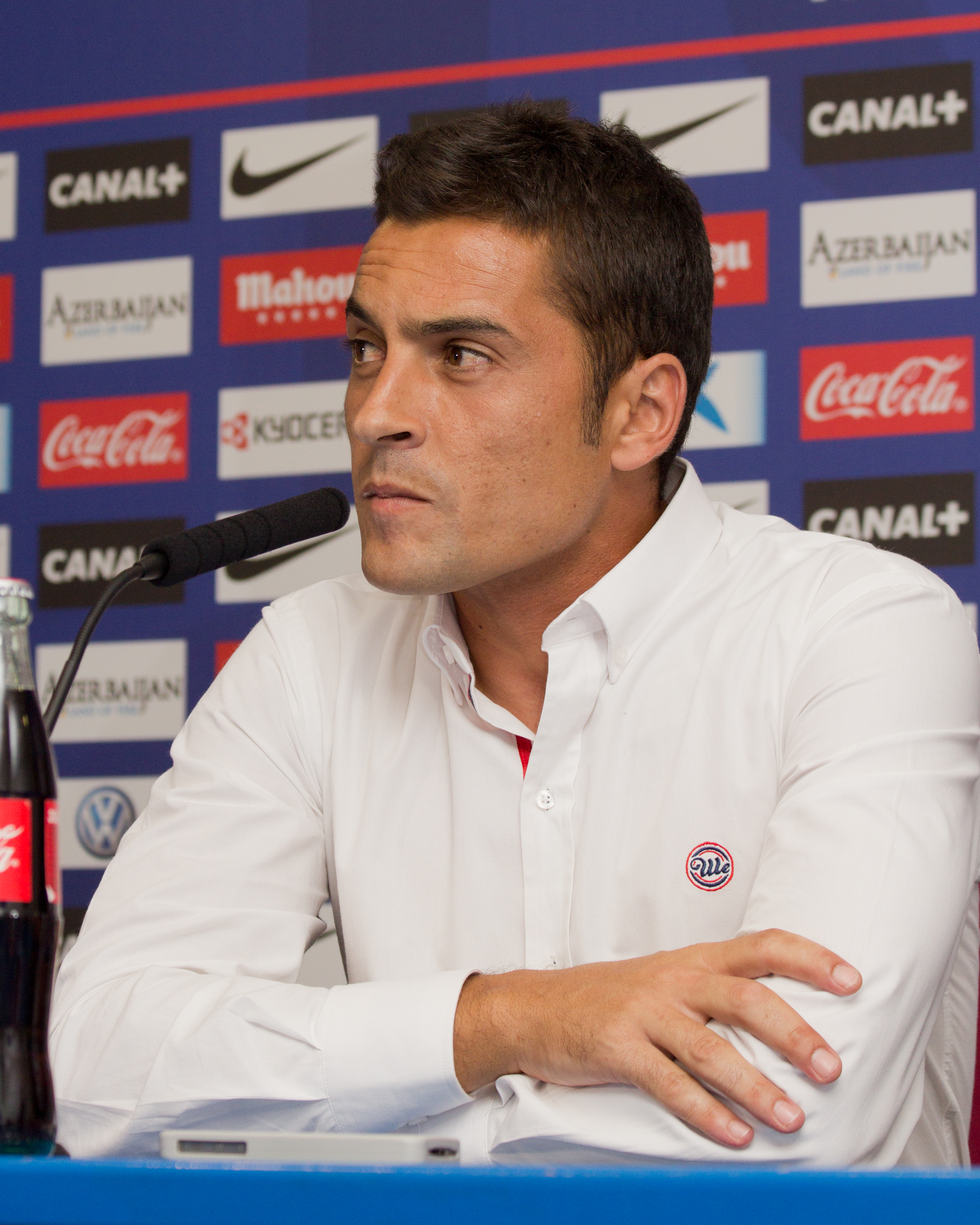
- Francisco as Almería manager in 2013

Personal information
- Full name: Francisco Javier Rodríguez Vílchez
- Date of birth: 17 June 1978 (age 48)
- Place of birth: Almería, Spain
- Height: 1.73 m (5 ft 8 in)
- Position: Forward

Youth career
- 1995–1996: Plus Ultra
- 1996–1997: Espanyol

Senior career*
Years	Team	Apps	(Gls)
1997–1999	Poli Almería	72	(15)
1999–2001	Valencia B	41	(7)
2000–2001	→ Poli Ejido (loan)	41	(7)
2002–2004	Almería	103	(36)
2004–2005	Albacete	28	(3)
2005–2007	Almería	48	(9)
2007–2008	Granada 74	35	(3)
2008–2009	Alicante	22	(2)
2010	Orihuela	14	(5)
Total		404	(87)

Managerial career
- 2010–2011: Almería (youth)
- 2011–2013: Almería B
- 2013–2014: Almería
- 2016–2017: UCAM Murcia
- 2017–2018: Lugo
- 2018: Córdoba
- 2018–2019: Huesca
- 2020–2021: Girona
- 2021–2022: Elche
- 2023–2024: Rayo Vallecano
- 2025–2026: Santos Laguna
- * Club domestic league appearances and goals

Francisco Javier Rodríguez Vílchez (born 17 June 1978), known simply as Francisco, is a Spanish former professional footballer who played as a forward, currently a manager.

His career was closely associated with Almería as both a player and manager, and he started coaching the first team at the age of 35. In the former capacity, he amassed Segunda División totals of 185 matches and 45 goals over six seasons, also representing Granada 74 and Alicante in the competition.

== Playing career ==
Francisco was born in Almería, Andalusia. After starting out with local Polideportivo Almería he joined Valencia, never making it however past its B side. He returned to his hometown in 2002, joining Unión Deportiva in the Segunda División and scoring at an impressive rate.

In 2004–05, as his contract expired, Francisco seized the opportunity to make his La Liga debut and signed with Albacete. The season was a disaster, with relegation for the team and only three goals for the player – he netted against Real Madrid, albeit in a 6–1 away loss.

Subsequently, Francisco returned to his previous club, and was fairly played by as it achieved a first-ever promotion to the top flight in 2007, but would never play in that tier again, resuming (with little individual and team success) his career in divisions two and three.

== Coaching career ==
Francisco started his managerial career in 2010, coaching in various categories at his main club Almería. On 29 June 2013, after two seasons with the reserves, he was appointed at the helm of the first team, recently returned to the top flight.

After narrowly avoiding relegation in the last matchday, and winning La Liga Manager of the Month for November and May, Francisco inked a new one-year deal at the Estadio de los Juegos Mediterráneos on 27 May 2014. On 9 December, however, he was relieved of his duties after only managing two points out of 24.

On 13 December 2016, after more than two years unemployed, Francisco was named manager of UCAM Murcia of division two. The following 21 June, he was appointed at Lugo from the same league.

On 28 June 2018, Francisco signed with Córdoba still in the second division, but he resigned on 2 August due to the club's poor financial situation. He returned to the top tier on 10 October, replacing the dismissed Leo Franco at Huesca. In May 2019, after their relegation, he turned down a new contract.

Francisco returned to the second division on 30 June 2020, taking over from José Luis Martí at fifth-placed Girona for the last six games of the season and the following campaign. He left on 30 June as his contract expired, after the side missed out on promotion twice in the finals.

On 28 November 2021, Francisco was appointed at top-flight Elche until the end of the campaign. On 4 October 2022, with his team in last place, he was sacked.

On 28 June 2023, Francisco signed for Rayo Vallecano also in the top tier, replacing Andoni Iraola. He was dismissed the following February, having only won once in the league in the last 14 matches.

Francisco became head coach of Liga MX club Santos Laguna on 10 May 2025, being officially presented 13 days later. On 17 February 2026, he was fired.

== Managerial statistics ==
As of 15 February 2026

Managerial record by team and tenure
Team	Nat	From	To	Record								Ref
Team	Nat	From	To	G	W	D	L	GF	GA	GD	Win %	Ref
Almería B	(Spain)	2 June 2011	29 June 2013	80	31	22	27	104	109	−5	38.75	
Almería	(Spain)	29 June 2013	9 December 2014	57	15	13	29	62	98	−36	26.32	
UCAM Murcia	(Spain)	13 December 2016	21 June 2017	25	7	9	9	21	25	−4	28.00	
Lugo	(Spain)	21 June 2017	5 June 2018	44	15	11	18	40	50	−10	34.09	
Córdoba	(Spain)	28 June 2018	2 August 2018	0	0	0	0	0	0	+0	—	
Huesca	(Spain)	10 October 2018	19 May 2019	32	6	10	16	36	55	−19	18.75	
Girona	(Spain)	30 June 2020	30 June 2021	60	30	15	15	67	48	+19	50.00	
Elche	(Spain)	28 November 2021	4 October 2022	34	12	4	18	37	52	−15	35.29	
Rayo Vallecano	(Spain)	28 June 2023	13 February 2024	28	8	9	11	32	35	−3	28.57	
Santos Laguna	(Mexico)	10 May 2025	17 February 2026	26	6	3	17	28	55	−27	23.08	
Total				386	130	96	160	429	527	−98	33.68	—

== Honours ==
=== Manager ===
- La Liga: Manager of the Month November 2013, May 2014
