= Raúl Sánchez (footballer, born 1976) =

Spanish footballer

Personal information
- Full name: Raúl Sánchez Soler
- Date of birth: 1 December 1976 (age 49)
- Place of birth: Almería, Spain
- Height: 1.85 m (6 ft 1 in)
- Position: Striker

Youth career
- Oriente

Senior career*
Years	Team	Apps	(Gls)
1995–1997	San Isidro		
1997–1999	Almería	67	(16)
1999–2000	Linense	27	(5)
2000–2002	Almería	74	(41)
2002–2005	Salamanca	75	(22)
2005–2006	Castellón	28	(10)
2006–2007	Tenerife	30	(7)
2007–2009	Alavés	27	(3)
2009–2010	Poli Ejido	29	(7)
Total		360	(111)
- * Club domestic league appearances and goals

Raúl Sánchez Soler (born 1 December 1976) is a Spanish retired footballer who played as a striker.

His career was closely associated with Almería, after scoring a career-best 25 goals in the 2001–02 campaign.

== Playing career ==
Sánchez was born in Almería, Andalusia. After graduating from local CD Oriente he joined CD San Isidro de Níjar, and appeared with the side in Tercera División. In the 1997 summer he moved to hometown's UD Almería, appearing regularly but suffering relegation from Segunda División B in the 1998–99 season.

In 1999 Sánchez moved to Real Balompédica Linense, also in the third level; a year later he moved back to Almería, scoring regularly and being promoted to Segunda División in 2002. In July 2002 he rejected a contract renewal and moved to UD Salamanca, also in the second level.

On 31 August 2002 Sánchez played his first match as a professional, starting in a 2–1 away success against his former club Almería, scoring his first goal on 9 February of the following year, netting the first of a 2–1 home win against the same team. He continued to appear in the second level in the following campaigns, representing CD Castellón, CD Tenerife and Deportivo Alavés.

On 8 August 2009 Sánchez joined Polideportivo Ejido in the third level, retiring at the end of the season, aged 33.
