= UD Almería =

Association football club in Spain

Almería
- Full name: Unión Deportiva Almería, S.A.D.
- Nicknames: Cowboys; La Unión; Almeriensistas; Los Indálicos; Los Rojiblancos
- Short name: UDA
- Founded: 26 July 1989; 37 years ago as Almería Club de Fútbol
- Stadium: UD Almería Stadium
- Capacity: 18,311
- Owner(s): SMC Group (75%); Cristiano Ronaldo (25%)
- President: Mohammed Al-Khereiji
- Head coach: García Pimienta
- League: Segunda División
- 2025–26: Segunda División, 3rd of 22
- Website: udalmeriasad.com
| Home colours | Away colours | Third colours |

Unión Deportiva Almería, S.A.D. (Spanish pronunciation: [uˈnjon depoɾˈtiβ(a) almeˈɾi.a]) is a Spanish professional football club based in Almería, in the autonomous community of Andalusia. Founded on 26 July 1989 and known as Almería Club de Fútbol until 2001, when it was renamed Unión Deportiva Almería. The club currently plays in the Segunda División, and plays their home games at the 17,400-seat capacity UD Almería Stadium.

== History ==
The first football club in Almería was founded in 1909: Almería Foot-Ball Club. Since then, several Almería football clubs appeared and disappeared. One of them was AD Almería, a team that played in La Liga between 1979 and 1981, but disappeared in 1982, and was arguably UD Almería's predecessor.

In 1989, a club named Almería Club de Fútbol was born, but in 2001 was renamed Unión Deportiva Almería. On 19 January 2001 the mayor of Almería Santiago Martínez Cabrejas announced in the city council that the new club UD Almería had been formed after the merger of two city teams - Polideportivo Almería and Almería CF. But UD Almería was not official until 28 June 2001, when Almería CF approved at the General Meeting of Shareholders the renaming. After playing one season in the second division, it was relegated to the third and the fourth divisions.

After spending several seasons in the second level, Almería side was first promoted to the top flight after finishing runner-up in the 2006–07 season. After some outstanding performances, as the away win against Deportivo de La Coruña 3–0 in the first La Liga match, the team achieved a final 8th league place in 2007–08. At the club's helm was coach Unai Emery, as striker Álvaro Negredo finished team topscorer with 13 goals.

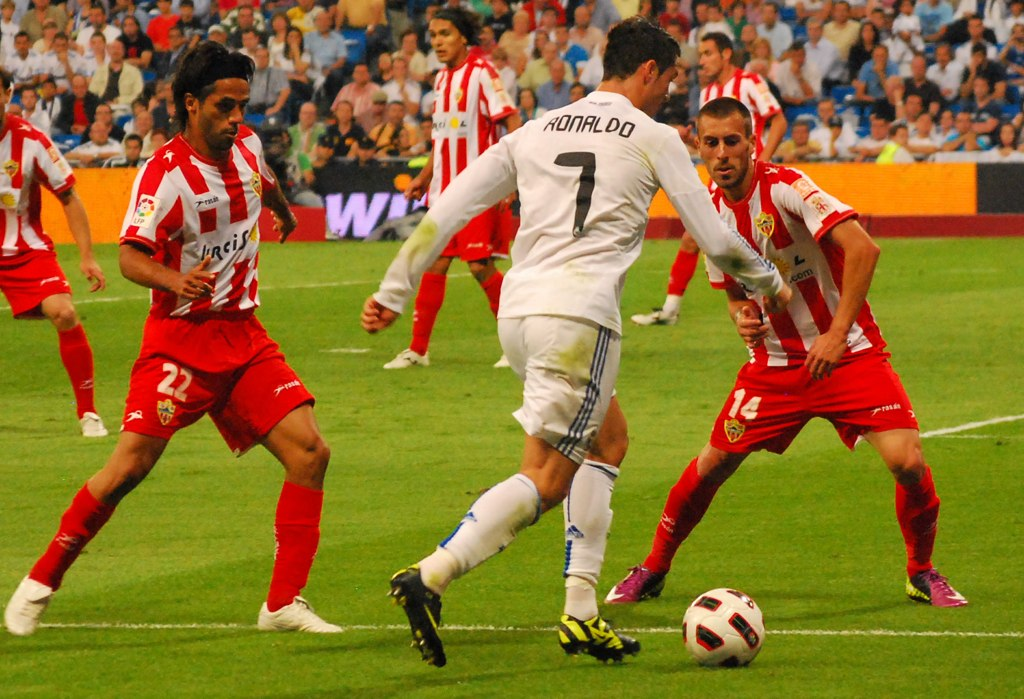
UD Almería players facing Real Madrid's Cristiano Ronaldo (who now owns a part of the club) in 2011

After Emery left for Valencia CF, Gonzalo Arconada stepped in, but was sacked on 21 December 2008, after a string of poor results, albeit without ever reaching the last three. Mexican Hugo Sánchez took the job, and fared slightly better, for a final mid-table position.

In 2010–11, Almería reached the semifinals of the Copa del Rey for the first time ever. In the league, however, the club was finally relegated after a four-year spell in the top flight; in November 2010, coach Juan Manuel Lillo was fired after a 0–8 home loss against FC Barcelona (precisely the team that ousted the Andalusians in the domestic cup's last-four, with the same score, but on aggregate), and his successor José Luis Oltra met the same fate, in April 2011. He was replaced by Roberto Olabe.

Chart of UD Almería league performance 1929-present

After two seasons in the second level, Almería returned to the main category of Spanish football on 22 June 2013, after defeating Girona FC in the play-offs. After the departure of manager Javi Gracia, the club appointed their former player and manager of the reserves at the time Francisco Javier Rodríguez Vílchez; the team eventually managed to survive in 2013–14, finishing 16th.

Francisco was sacked in December 2014, after only managing two points out of 24, and was later replaced by Juan Ignacio Martínez. "JIM" also only lasted until April of the following year, and even with new manager Sergi Barjuán, the club was relegated after finishing 19th.

In the 2018–19 season, Almería finally escaped the tough fight for the permanence in Segunda División until the last matches as during 3 previous seasons. This time they were closer to the promotion play-offs to La Liga, and finished 10th from 22 teams participated.

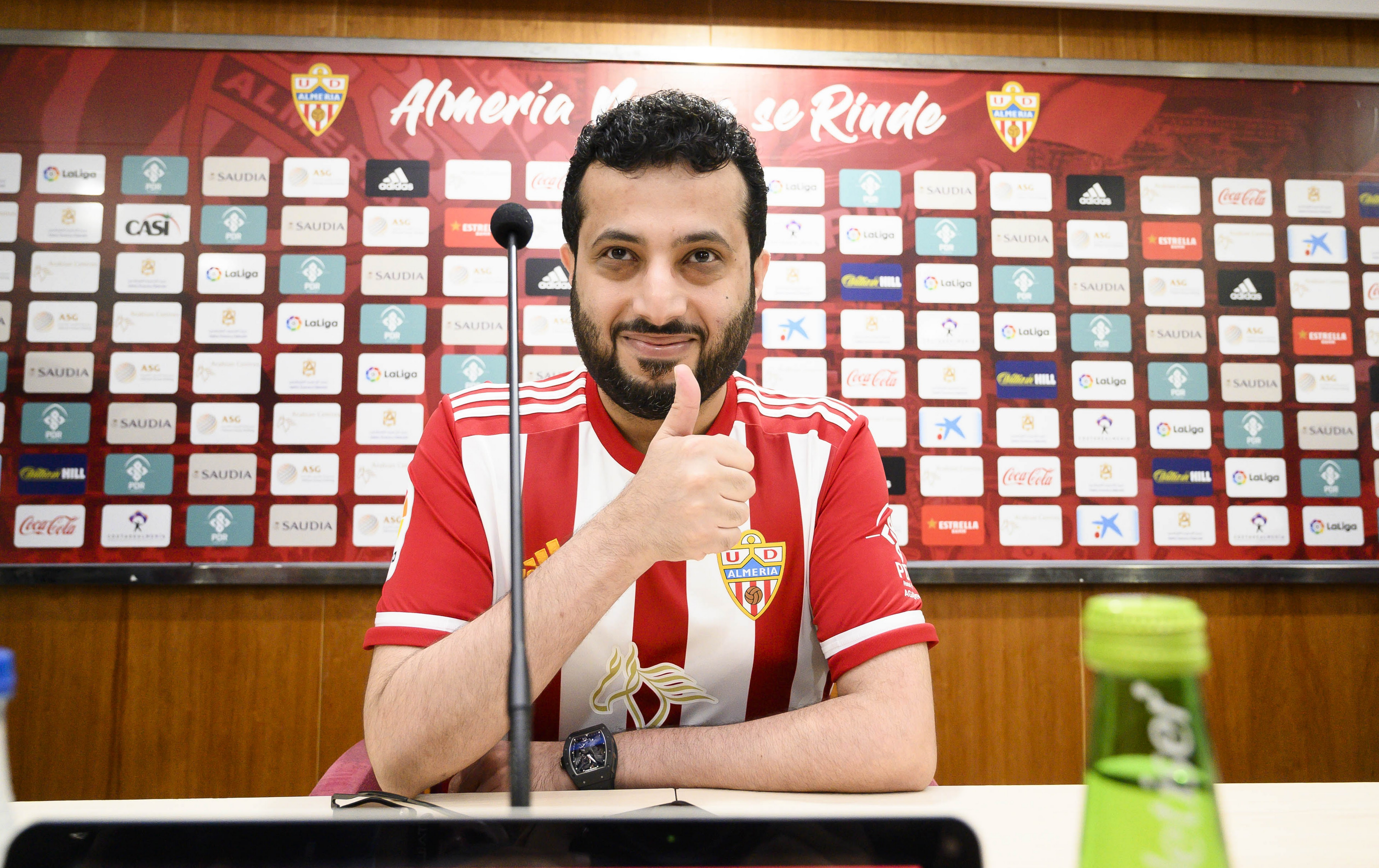
Turki Al-Sheikh during a press conference in 2019

On 2 August 2019, Turki Al-Sheikh became the owner of the club, replacing Alfonso García Gabarrón. He appointed Mohamed El Assy as general director, Dario Drudi as sporting director, who replaced Miguel Ángel Corona, and manager Óscar Fernández was replaced by Pedro Emanuel. On 5 November 2019, it was announced Guti replaced Emanuel. On 26 June 2020, he was ceased and replaced by Mario Silva, who was himself replaced by José Gomes on 27 July.

In August 2021, UD Almería (Mohamed El Assy) and the Ayuntamiento de Almería (Ramón Fernández-Pacheco Monterreal) agreed to a lease on the operation of the municipally owned Estadio de los Juegos Mediterráneos for a 25-year period. In June 2022, the club achieved promotion to the first division by sealing a 1st position in the table, respectively, on the very last match day of the season, after spending seven years in the second tier.

In the 2023–24 season, UD Almería started the season with record of 28 league games without a win between 11 August 2023 to 11 March 2024. At last, the club secured a victory against Las Palmas οn 17 March 2024. However, they were relegated to second division after a 1–3 loss to Getafe on 27 April 2024, ending their two-year stay in top tier.

In May 2025, UD Almería underwent a significant ownership change, with Saudi investment consortium SMC Group, led by Mohammed Al-Khereiji, acquiring the club from Turki Al-Sheikh. On 26 February 2026, Portuguese footballer Cristiano Ronaldo acquired 25% stake in the club through CR7 Sports Investments.

== Season to season ==
| Season | Level | Division | Place | Copa del Rey |
|---|---|---|---|---|
| 1989–90 | 5 | Reg. Pref. | 1st | |
| 1990–91 | 5 | Reg. Pref. | 3rd | |
| 1991–92 | 5 | Reg. Pref. | 2nd | |
| 1992–93 | 4 | 3ª | 2nd | |
| 1993–94 | 3 | 2ª B | 11th | Fourth round |
| 1994–95 | 3 | 2ª B | 2nd | Second round |
| 1995–96 | 2 | 2ª | 16th | Second round |
| 1996–97 | 2 | 2ª | 17th | Second round |
| 1997–98 | 3 | 2ª B | 7th | First round |
| 1998–99 | 3 | 2ª B | 18th | |
| 1999–2000 | 4 | 3ª | 4th | |
| 2000–01 | 3 | 2ª B | 11th | |
| 2001–02 | 3 | 2ª B | 3rd | |
| 2002–03 | 2 | 2ª | 18th | Round of 32 |
| 2003–04 | 2 | 2ª | 13th | Round of 32 |
| 2004–05 | 2 | 2ª | 14th | Second round |
| 2005–06 | 2 | 2ª | 6th | First round |
| 2006–07 | 2 | 2ª | 2nd | Third round |
| 2007–08 | 1 | 1ª | 8th | Round of 32 |
| 2008–09 | 1 | 1ª | 11th | Round of 16 |

| Season | Level | Division | Place | Copa del Rey |
|---|---|---|---|---|
| 2009–10 | 1 | 1ª | 13th | Round of 32 |
| 2010–11 | 1 | 1ª | 20th | Semi-finals |
| 2011–12 | 2 | 2ª | 7th | Round of 32 |
| 2012–13 | 2 | 2ª | 3rd | Round of 32 |
| 2013–14 | 1 | 1ª | 17th | Round of 16 |
| 2014–15 | 1 | 1ª | 19th | Round of 16 |
| 2015–16 | 2 | 2ª | 18th | Round of 32 |
| 2016–17 | 2 | 2ª | 15th | Second round |
| 2017–18 | 2 | 2ª | 18th | Second round |
| 2018–19 | 2 | 2ª | 10th | Round of 32 |
| 2019–20 | 2 | 2ª | 4th | First round |
| 2020–21 | 2 | 2ª | 4th | Quarter-finals |
| 2021–22 | 2 | 2ª | 1st | Round of 32 |
| 2022–23 | 1 | 1ª | 17th | First round |
| 2023–24 | 1 | 1ª | 19th | Second round |
| 2024–25 | 2 | 2ª | 6th | Round of 16 |
| 2025–26 | 2 | 2ª | 3rd | Second round |
| 2026–27 | 2 | 2ª | | TBD |

- 8 seasons in La Liga
- 19 seasons in Segunda División
- 6 seasons in Segunda División B
- 2 seasons in Tercera División
- 3 seasons in Categorías Regionales

== Players ==
As of 3 September 2026

Note: Flags indicate national team as defined under FIFA eligibility rules; some limited exceptions apply. Players may hold more than one non-FIFA nationality.

| No. | Pos. | Nation | Player |
|---|---|---|---|
| 1 | GK | ESP | Andrés Fernández |
| 2 | DF | ESP | Jorge Pulido |
| 3 | DF | ESP | Álex Muñoz |
| 5 | DF | BRA | Rodrigo Ely |
| 7 | FW | ESP | Jon Morcillo |
| 8 | MF | POR | Gui Guedes |
| 9 | FW | BRA | Thalys |
| 10 | MF | ESP | Nico Melamed |
| 11 | MF | ESP | Sergio Arribas |
| 12 | FW | BRA | Léo Baptistão |
| 13 | GK | ESP | Fernando Martínez |
| 14 | MF | ESP | Javi Muñoz |
| 15 | DF | POR | Leonardo Lelo (on loan from Braga) |

| No. | Pos. | Nation | Player |
|---|---|---|---|
| 16 | DF | ESP | Marcos Luna |
| 17 | FW | COD | Brian Cipenga |
| 18 | DF | ITA | Federico Bonini |
| 19 | MF | ESP | Mikel Vesga |
| 20 | FW | ESP | Álex Sola |
| 21 | DF | ESP | Chumi |
| 22 | DF | CUW | Daijiro Chirino |
| 23 | FW | ESP | Adrián Embarba |
| 24 | FW | ESP | Miguel de la Fuente |
| 29 | MF | SRB | Stefan Džodić |
| 31 | GK | HUN | Áron Yaakobishvili (on loan from Barcelona) |
| 33 | MF | ESP | Quim Junyent |

=== Reserve team ===
Note: Flags indicate national team as defined under FIFA eligibility rules; some limited exceptions apply. Players may hold more than one non-FIFA nationality.

| No. | Pos. | Nation | Player |
|---|---|---|---|
| 26 | MF | FRA | Kassoum Kone |
| 28 | DF | MLI | Ayouba Koné |

| No. | Pos. | Nation | Player |
|---|---|---|---|
| 30 | GK | ESP | Jesús López |
| 32 | DF | SRB | Andrej Popović |

=== Other players under contract ===
Note: Flags indicate national team as defined under FIFA eligibility rules; some limited exceptions apply. Players may hold more than one non-FIFA nationality.

| No. | Pos. | Nation | Player |
|---|---|---|---|
| — | FW | MLI | Ibrahima Koné |

=== Out on loan ===
Note: Flags indicate national team as defined under FIFA eligibility rules; some limited exceptions apply. Players may hold more than one non-FIFA nationality.

| No. | Pos. | Nation | Player |
|---|---|---|---|
| — | DF | ESP | Edgar González (at Sabadell until 30 June 2027) |
| — | DF | POR | Nélson Monte (at Córdoba until 30 June 2027) |
| — | MF | ARG | Lucas Robertone (at Vélez Sarsfield until 31 December 2026) |

| No. | Pos. | Nation | Player |
|---|---|---|---|
| — | MF | ESP | Selvi Clua (at Casa Pia until 30 June 2027) |
| — | FW | CMR | Patrick Soko (at Leganés until 30 June 2027) |

== Technical staff ==
| Position | Staff |
|---|---|
| Head coach | (Spain) García Pimienta |
| Assistant coach | (Spain) Jaume Torras |
| Chief of fitness coach | (Spain) Xavi Gil |
| Fitness coach | (Spain) Víctor Fortes (Spain) Manel García |
| Team manager | (Spain) Salva Sevilla |
| Goalkeeping coach | (Spain) Ricardo Molina (Spain) Diego Tuero |
| Technical assistant | (Spain) Joan Carrillo (Spain) Joan Ferrer |
| Rehab fitness coach | (Spain) Álvaro Cano |
| Equipment manager | (Spain) Bernardo Hernández (Spain) Mateo Ruiz (Spain) Juan Ventaja |
| Equipment manager woman | (Spain) Eva María Hernández |
| Chief of medical services | (Spain) Sebastián Jiménez |
| Physiotherapy coordinator | (Spain) Cid Andrade |
| Physiotherapist | (Spain) Pedro Serrano (Spain) Edu Antequera (Spain) Carlos Fernández |
| Nutritionist | (Spain) José González |
| Psychologist | (Spain) Javier Fernández |

Last updated: 11 September 2025
Source: UD Almería (in Spanish)

== Notable players ==
Note: this list includes players that have appeared in at least 100 league games and/or have reached international status.

- (Algeria) Sofiane Feghouli
- (Argentina) Hernán Bernardello
- (Argentina) Pablo Piatti
- (Argentina) Óscar Ustari
- (Argentina) Diego Valeri
- (Brazil) Diego Alves
- (Brazil) Paulo Jamelli
- (Brazil) Felipe Melo
- (Brazil) Michel Macedo
- (Burkina Faso) Jonathan Zongo
- (Cameroon) Modeste M'bami
- (Chile) Hans Martínez
- (Chile) Lorenzo Reyes
- (Colombia) Fabián Vargas
- (Colombia) Luis Suárez
- (Republic of the Congo) Thievy Bifouma
- (Croatia) Mate Bilić
- (Denmark) Michael Jakobsen
- (Equatorial Guinea) Sena
- (Eritrea) Henok Goitom
- (Ghana) Iddrisu Baba
- (Hungary) Ferenc Horváth
- (Israel) Tomer Hemed
- (Mali) Ibrahima Koné
- (Netherlands) Sander Westerveld
- (Nigeria) Ramon Azeez
- (Nigeria) Kalu Uche
- (Paraguay) Diego Barreto
- (Paraguay) Peque Benítez
- (Peru) Santiago Acasiete
- (Peru) Miguel Rebosio
- (Portugal) Hélder Barbosa
- (Portugal) Nélson Marcos
- (Romania) Constantin Gâlcă
- (Serbia and Montenegro) Veljko Paunović
- (Senegal) Dion Lopy
- (Serbia) Srđan Babić
- (Spain) Bruno
- (Spain) Álvaro Cervera
- (Spain) Juan Cervián
- (Spain) Corona
- (Spain) Albert Crusat
- (Spain) Esteban
- (Spain) Esteban Navarro
- (Spain) Fernando
- (Spain) Francisco
- (Spain) Carlos García
- (Spain) Julio
- (Spain) López Rekarte
- (Spain) Luna
- (Spain) Mané
- (Spain) Álvaro Negredo
- (Spain) José Ortiz
- (Spain) Juanma Ortiz
- (Spain) Juan Portillo
- (Spain) Raúl Sánchez
- (Spain) Fernando Soriano
- (Spain) Ángel Trujillo
- (Spain) Verza
- (Spain) Aleix Vidal
- (Thailand) Teerasil Dangda
- (Venezuela) Julio Álvarez
- (Uruguay) Darwin Núñez
- (Socialist Federal Republic of Yugoslavia) Ivica Barbarić

=== World Cup players ===
The following players have been selected by their country in the World Cup Finals, while playing for Almería.

- (Nigeria) Kalu Uche (2010)
- (Nigeria) Ramon Azeez (2014)
- (Serbia) Srđan Babić (2022)

== Uniform ==
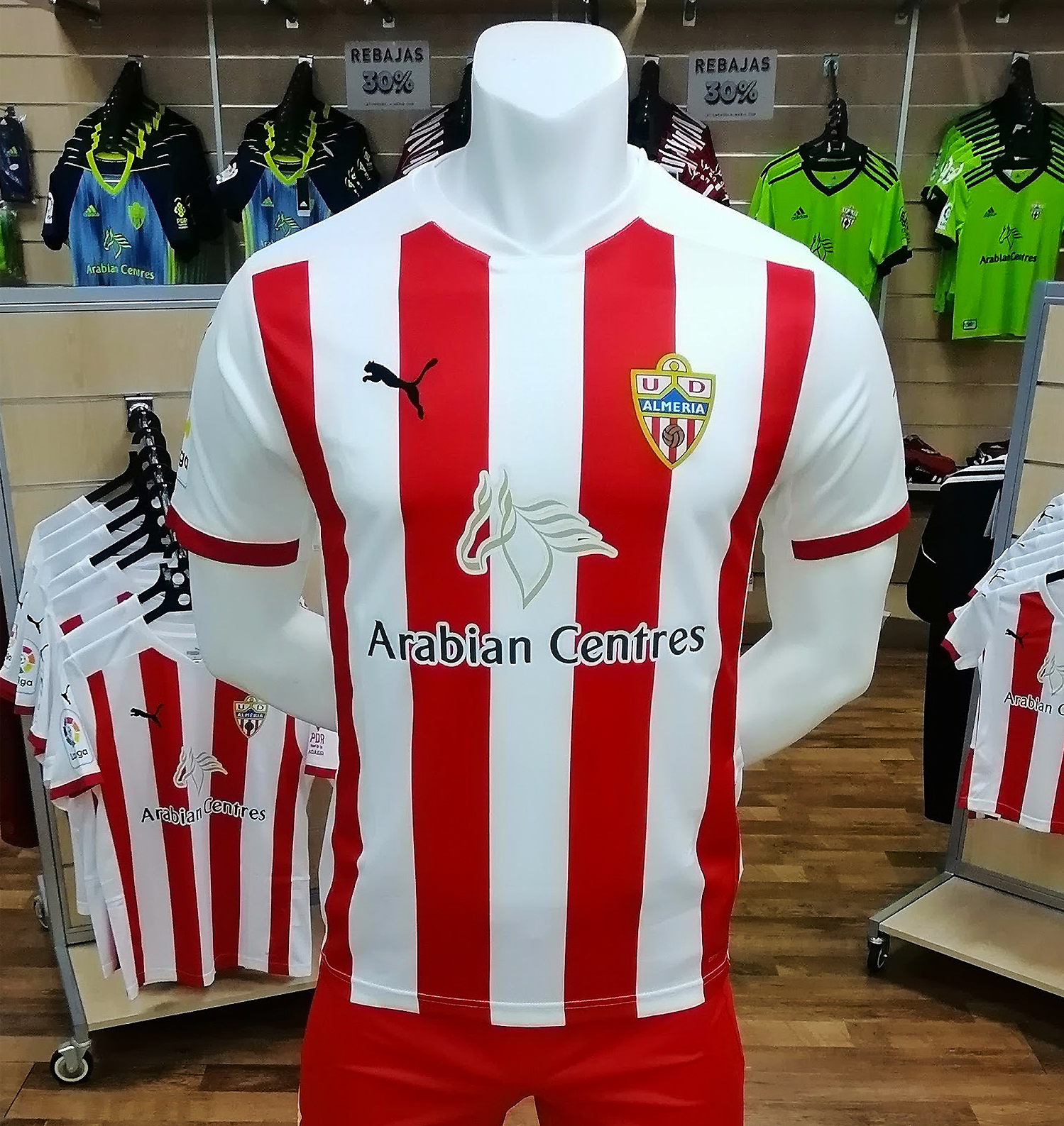
Almería's uniform in the 2020–21 season.

| Period | Kit Manufacturer | Sponsors |
|---|---|---|
| 2001–07 | Cejudo | Obrascampo |
| 2007–08 | UDA | Obrascampo |
| 2008–10 | UDA | None^{1} |
| 2010–12 | Rasán | Urcisol |
| 2012–19 | Nike | Urcisol |
| 2019–20 | Adidas | Arabian Centres |
| 2020–22 | Puma | Arabian Centres |
| 2022–2024 | Castore | Khaled Juffali Co. |
| 2024–2025 | Castore | DAZN |
| 2025– | Macron | Kudu |

^{1} The shirt contained messages such as Isla del Fraile or Corredor de Vida.

== Honours ==
- Segunda División
  - Champions (1): 2021–22

== See also ==
- UD Almería B – Almería's B team
- AD Almería
- List of managers
- List of statistics
