= 2005–06 Cádiz CF season =

Cádiz CF
2005–06 season
- Chairman: Antonio Muñoz
- Manager: Víctor Espárrago
- Stadium: Carranza
- La Liga: 19th (relegated)
- Copa del Rey: Quarter-finals
- Top goalscorer: League: Lucas Lobos; Jonathan Sesma (7 each); All: Lucas Lobos; Jonathan Sesma (7 each)
Home colours	Away colours

The 2005–06 season was the 96th season in Cádiz CF’s history.

== Squad ==
As of 13 March 2021

Note: Flags indicate national team as defined under FIFA eligibility rules; some limited exceptions apply. Players may hold more than one non-FIFA nationality.

No.	Pos.	Nation	Player
1	GK	ESP	Armando
2	DF	COL	José de la Cuesta
3	DF	ESP	Raúl López
4	DF	ESP	Ramón de Quintana
5	DF	ESP	Abraham Paz
6	MF	ESP	Roberto Suárez
7	DF	ARG	Eduardo Berizzo
8	FW	ESP	Enrique
9	FW	ESP	Oli
10	FW	URU	Fabián Estoyanoff (on loan from Valencia)
11	MF	ARG	Matías Pavoni
12	FW	SCG	Nenad Mirosavljević
13	GK	ESP	Raúl Navas

No.	Pos.	Nation	Player
14	DF	ESP	Iván Ania
15	MF	EQG	Benjamín
16	MF	URU	Andrés Fleurquin
17	MF	ARG	Lucas Lobos
17	FW	PAR	Javier Acuña
18	DF	POR	Mário Silva
19	MF	ESP	Jonathan Sesma
20	FW	URU	Alexander Medina
21	DF	ESP	Alejandro Varela
22	DF	ARG	Luciano Vella
23	MF	ESP	Fernando Morán
24	MF	ESP	Juanjo Bezares
25	GK	ARG	Alejandro Limia

=== Left club during season ===
Note: Flags indicate national team as defined under FIFA eligibility rules; some limited exceptions apply. Players may hold more than one non-FIFA nationality.

No. / Pos. / Nation / Player; — / DF / ESP / Marc Bertrán (to Lorca Deportiva)	No. / Pos. / Nation / Player; — / MF / ESP / Manolo Pérez (to Hércules)

== Squad stats ==
Last updated on 13 March 2021.

No.	Pos	Nat	Player	Total		La Liga		Copa del Rey	
No.	Pos	Nat	Player	Apps	Goals	Apps	Goals	Apps	Goals
1	GK	(Spain) ESP	Armando	25	0	25	0	0	0
2	DF	(Colombia) COL	José de la Cuesta	20	1	15	0	5	1
3	DF	(Spain) ESP	Raúl López	29	1	27	1	2	0
4	DF	(Spain) ESP	Ramón de Quintana	32	0	28	0	4	0
5	DF	(Spain) ESP	Abraham Paz	25	1	20+2	1	3	0
6	MF	(Spain) ESP	Roberto Suárez	25	0	21+2	0	2	0
7	DF	(Argentina) ARG	Eduardo Berizzo	17	0	13+1	0	3	0
8	FW	(Spain) ESP	Enrique	39	4	29+7	4	3	0
9	FW	(Spain) ESP	Oli	34	2	15+14	1	4+1	1
10	FW	(Uruguay) URU	Fabián Estoyanoff	33	2	10+19	2	3+1	0
11	MF	(Argentina) ARG	Matías Pavoni	31	4	26+3	4	2	0
12	FW	(Serbia and Montenegro) SCG	Nenad Mirosavljević	18	5	8+4	3	2+4	2
13	GK	(Spain) ESP	Raúl Navas	4	0	0	0	4	0
14	DF	(Spain) ESP	Iván Ania	13	1	5+4	0	4	1
15	MF	(Equatorial Guinea) EQG	Benjamín	18	1	7+7	0	3+1	1
16	MF	(Uruguay) URU	Andrés Fleurquin	36	1	27+3	1	4+2	0
17	MF	(Argentina) ARG	Lucas Lobos	23	7	14+6	7	1+2	0
17	FW	(Paraguay) PAR	Javier Acuña	0	0	0	0	0	0
18	DF	(Portugal) POR	Mário Silva	11	0	6+1	0	4	0
19	MF	(Spain) ESP	Jonathan Sesma	39	7	29+7	7	2+1	0
20	FW	(Uruguay) URU	Alexander Medina	21	5	13+6	4	1+1	1
21	DF	(Spain) ESP	Alejandro Varela	37	0	34+1	0	1+1	0
22	DF	(Argentina) ARG	Luciano Vella	10	0	8+2	0	0	0
23	MF	(Spain) ESP	Fernando Morán	17	0	4+11	0	1+1	0
24	MF	(Spain) ESP	Juanjo Bezares	31	0	20+7	0	2+2	0
25	GK	(Argentina) ARG	Alejandro Limia	15	0	13	0	2	0
Players who have left the club after the start of the season:
	DF	(Spain) ESP	Marc Bertrán	3	0	1	0	2	0
	MF	(Spain) ESP	Manolo Pérez	6	1	0+4	1	2	0

== Competitions ==
=== Overall ===
Competition	Final position
La Liga	19th (relegated)
Copa del Rey	Quarter-finals

=== La Liga ===
Pos	Team	Pld	W	D	L	GF	GA	GD	Pts	Qualification or relegation
16	Real Sociedad	38	11	7	20	48	65	−17	40	
17	Racing Santander	38	9	13	16	36	49	−13	40	
18	Alavés (R)	38	9	12	17	35	54	−19	39	Relegation to the Segunda División
19	Cádiz (R)	38	8	12	18	36	52	−16	36	Relegation to the Segunda División
20	Málaga (R)	38	5	9	24	36	68	−32	24	Relegation to the Segunda División

Source: LFP
Rules for classification: 1st points; 2nd head-to-head points; 3rd head-to-head goal difference; 4th head-to-head goals scored; 5th goal difference; 6th number of goals scored; 7th Fair-play points
(R) Relegated

=== Copa del Rey ===
Win Draw Loss

Round	Opponent	Venue	Result
Third round	Albacete Balompié	A	3–1 (a.e.t.)
Fourth round	Burgos	A	2–0

Round	Opponent	Aggregate	Venue	First Leg	Venue	Second Leg
Round of 16	Sevilla	3–2	H	3–2	A	0–0
Quarter-finals	Espanyol	0–4	H	0–2	A	0–2
