= 2004–05 Cádiz CF season =

Cádiz
2004–05 season
- Head coach: Víctor Espárrago
- Stadium: Ramón de Carranza
- Segunda División: 1st (champions)
- Copa del Rey: Round of 32
- Top goalscorer: League: Jonathan Sesma (13); All: Jonathan Sesma (14)

The 2004–05 season was the 94th season in the existence of Cádiz CF and the club's second consecutive season in the second division of Spanish football. In addition to the domestic league, Cádiz participated in this season's edition of the Copa del Rey. The season covered the period from 1 July 2004 to 30 June 2005.

== Friendlies ==
5 January 2005 Friendly	Cádiz (Spain)	0–0	(Germany) Greuther Fürth	Novo Sancti Petri, Spain
16:30 CET (UTC+1)				Attendance: 20; Referee: (Spain)

== Competitions ==
=== Overview ===
Competition	First match	Last match	Starting round	Final position	Record							
Competition	First match	Last match	Starting round	Final position	Pld	W	D	L	GF	GA	GD	Win %
Segunda División	28 August 2004	18 June 2005	Matchday 1	Winners	42	21	13	8	68	30	+38	50.00
Copa del Rey	27 October 2004	10 November 2004	Round of 64	Round of 32	2	1	0	1	4	2	+2	50.00
Total					44	22	13	9	72	32	+40	50.00

Source: Competitions

=== Segunda División ===
==== League table ====
Pos	Team	Pld	W	D	L	GF	GA	GD	Pts	Promotion or relegation
1	Cádiz (C, P)	42	21	13	8	68	30	+38	76 (Note: CÁD: 9 pts; CEL: 4 pts → CEL 2-2 ALA; ALA: 4 pts → ALA 0-3 CEL)	Promotion to La Liga
2	Celta de Vigo (P)	42	22	10	10	55	38	+17	76	Promotion to La Liga
3	Alavés (P)	42	23	7	12	62	47	+15	76	Promotion to La Liga
4	Eibar	42	20	13	9	53	39	+14	73	
5	Recreativo	42	19	14	9	48	32	+16	71	

Source: LFP – Liga Adelante
Rules for classification: 1st points; 2nd head-to-head points; 3rd head-to-head goal difference; 4th head-to-head goals scored; 5th goal difference; 6th number of goals scored; 7th Fair-play points
(C) Champions; (P) Promoted

==== Results summary ====
Overall								Home						Away					
Pld	W	D	L	GF	GA	GD	Pts	W	D	L	GF	GA	GD	W	D	L	GF	GA	GD
42	21	13	8	68	30	+38	76	12	4	5	40	14	+26	9	9	3	28	16	+12

Source: Segunda División

==== Results by round ====
Round	1	2	3	4	5	6	7	8	9	10	11	12	13	14	15	16	17	18	19	20	21	22	23	24	25	26	27	28	29	30	31	32	33	34	35	36	37	38	39	40	41	42
Ground	A	H	A	H	A	H	A	H	A	H	H	A	H	A	H	A	H	A	H	A	H	H	A	H	A	H	A	H	A	H	A	A	H	A	H	A	H	A	H	A	H	A
Result	L	L	W	W	D	D	W	W	D	L	W	W	W	W	W	W	W	D	W	L	L	L	W	W	D	D	D	L	W	W	W	D	D	D	W	D	W	L	D	D	W	W
Position	12	21	17	14	14	15	9	5	6	8	7	4	2	2	1	1	1	1	1	1	2	3	1	1	1	2	3	3	3	2	2	2	2	2	2	3	3	3	3	3	2	1

Source: Segunda División
A = Away; H = Home; W = Win; D = Draw; L = Loss

==== Matches ====
28 August 2004 1	Eibar	2–1	Cádiz	Eibar
--:-- CEST (UTC+2)				Stadium: Ipurua

5 September 2004 2	Cádiz	0–2	Lleida	Cádiz
--:-- CEST (UTC+2)				Stadium: Ramón de Carranza

11 September 2004 3	Almería	0–1	Cádiz	Almería
--:-- CEST (UTC+2)				Stadium: Estadio de los Juegos Mediterráneos

19 September 2004 4	Cádiz	2–1	Gimnàstic	Cádiz
--:-- CEST (UTC+2)				Stadium: Ramón de Carranza

26 September 2004 5	Sporting Gijón	0–0	Cádiz	Gijón
--:-- CEST (UTC+2)				Stadium: El Molinón

3 October 2004 6	Cádiz	0–0	Recreativo	Cádiz
--:-- CEST (UTC+2)				Stadium: Ramón de Carranza

10 October 2004 7	Murcia	0–2	Cádiz	Murcia
--:-- CEST (UTC+2)				Stadium: Estadio de La Condomina

17 October 2004 8	Cádiz	2–0	Celta Vigo	Cádiz
--:-- CEST (UTC+2)				Stadium: Ramón de Carranza

24 October 2004 9	Racing Ferrol	1–1	Cádiz	Ferrol
--:-- CEST (UTC+2)				Stadium: A Malata

30 October 2004 10	Cádiz	0–1	Almería	Cádiz
--:-- CEST (UTC+2)				Stadium: Ramón de Carranza

6 November 2004 11	Cádiz	4–0	Málaga B	Cádiz
--:-- CEST (UTC+2)				Stadium: Ramón de Carranza

14 November 2004 12	Salamanca	1–3	Cádiz	Villares de la Reina
--:-- CET (UTC+1)				Stadium: Helmántico

20 November 2004 13	Cádiz	3–0	Poli Ejido	Cádiz
--:-- CEST (UTC+2)				Stadium: Ramón de Carranza

28 November 2004 14	Córdoba	0–2	Cádiz	Córdoba
--:-- CET (UTC+1)				Stadium: Nuevo Arcángel

5 December 2004 15	Cádiz	3–1	Elche	Cádiz
--:-- CET (UTC+1)				Stadium: Ramón de Carranza

12 December 2004 16	Valladolid	0–1	Cádiz	Valladolid
--:-- CET (UTC+1)				Stadium: Estadio José Zorrilla

18 December 2004 17	Cádiz	4–1	Tenerife	Cádiz
--:-- CET (UTC+1)				Stadium: Ramón de Carranza

22 December 2004 18	Ciudad de Murcia	0–0	Cádiz	Murcia
--:-- CET (UTC+1)				Stadium: Estadio de La Condomina

9 January 2005 19	Cádiz	4–0	Pontevedra	Cádiz
--:-- CET (UTC+1)				Stadium: Ramón de Carranza

16 January 2005 20	Terrassa	3–2	Cádiz	Terrassa
--:-- CET (UTC+1)				Stadium: Estadi Olímpic de Terrassa

23 January 2005 21	Cádiz	0–1	Xerez	Cádiz
--:-- CET (UTC+1)				Stadium: Ramón de Carranza

30 January 2005 22	Cádiz	0–1	Eibar	Cádiz
--:-- CET (UTC+1)				Stadium: Ramón de Carranza

6 February 2005 23	Lleida	1–3	Cádiz	Lleida
--:-- CET (UTC+1)				Stadium: Camp d'Esports

12 February 2005 24	Cádiz	2–1	Almería	Cádiz
--:-- CET (UTC+1)				Stadium: Ramón de Carranza

20 February 2005 25	Gimnàstic	1–1	Cádiz	Tarragona
--:-- CET (UTC+1)				Stadium: Nou Estadi

26 February 2005 26	Cádiz	0–0	Sporting Gijón	Cádiz
--:-- CET (UTC+1)				Stadium: Ramón de Carranza

5 March 2005 27	Recreativo	1–1	Cádiz	Huelva
--:-- CET (UTC+1)				Stadium: Nuevo Colombino

13 March 2005 28	Cádiz	0–1	Murcia	Cádiz
--:-- CET (UTC+1)				Stadium: Ramón de Carranza

20 March 2005 29	Celta Vigo	0–2	Cádiz	Vigo
--:-- CET (UTC+1)				Stadium: Balaídos

27 March 2005 30	Cádiz	2–0	Racing Ferrol	Cádiz
--:-- CET (UTC+1)				Stadium: Ramón de Carranza

3 April 2005 31	Alavés	1–3	Cádiz	Vitoria-Gasteiz
--:-- CEST (UTC+2)				Stadium: Mendizorrotza

9 April 2005 32	Málaga B	1–1	Cádiz	Málaga
--:-- CEST (UTC+2)				Stadium: La Rosaleda

17 April 2005 33	Cádiz	0–0	Salamanca	Cádiz
--:-- CEST (UTC+2)				Stadium: Ramón de Carranza

24 April 2005 34	Poli Ejido	0–0	Cádiz	El Ejido
--:-- CEST (UTC+2)				Stadium: Estadio Municipal Santo Domingo

1 May 2005 35	Cádiz	4–1	Córdoba	Cádiz
--:-- CEST (UTC+2)				Stadium: Ramón de Carranza

7 May 2005 36	Elche	1–1	Cádiz	Elche
--:-- CEST (UTC+2)				Stadium: Estadio Manuel Martínez Valero

15 May 2005 37	Cádiz	6–1	Valladolid	Cádiz
--:-- CEST (UTC+2)				Stadium: Ramón de Carranza

21 May 2005 38	Tenerife	2–0	Cádiz	Santa Cruz de Tenerife
--:-- CEST (UTC+2)	Gavilán 34', 41'			Stadium: Estadio Heliodoro Rodríguez López; Referee: Alfonso Javier Álvarez Izquierdo

29 May 2005 39	Cádiz	0–0	Ciudad de Murcia	Cádiz
--:-- CEST (UTC+2)				Stadium: Ramón de Carranza

4 June 2005 40	Pontevedra	1–1	Cádiz	Pontevedra
--:-- CEST (UTC+2)	Armando 63' (o.g.)		Oli 54'	Stadium: Estadio Municipal de Pasarón; Referee: Francisco Manuel Arcas Piqueres

12 June 2005 41	Cádiz	3–1	Terrassa	Cádiz
--:-- CEST (UTC+2)	De Quintana 28'; Sesma 67'; Pérez 81' (pen.)		Abraham 28'	Stadium: Ramón de Carranza; Referee: Jesús María Orueta Ibarrola

18 June 2005 42	Xerez	0–2	Cádiz	Jerez de la Frontera
--:-- CEST (UTC+2)			Oli 25'; Paz 50' (pen.)	Stadium: Estadio Municipal de Chapín; Referee: Manuel Ángel Pérez Lima

=== Copa del Rey ===
27 October 2004 Round of 64	Cádiz	4–0	Poli Ejido	Cádiz
--:-- CET (UTC+1)				Stadium: Ramón de Carranza

10 November 2004 Round of 32	Cádiz	0–2	Real Betis	Cádiz
--:-- CET (UTC+1)				Stadium: Ramón de Carranza
