= Gibraltarian football clubs in European competitions =

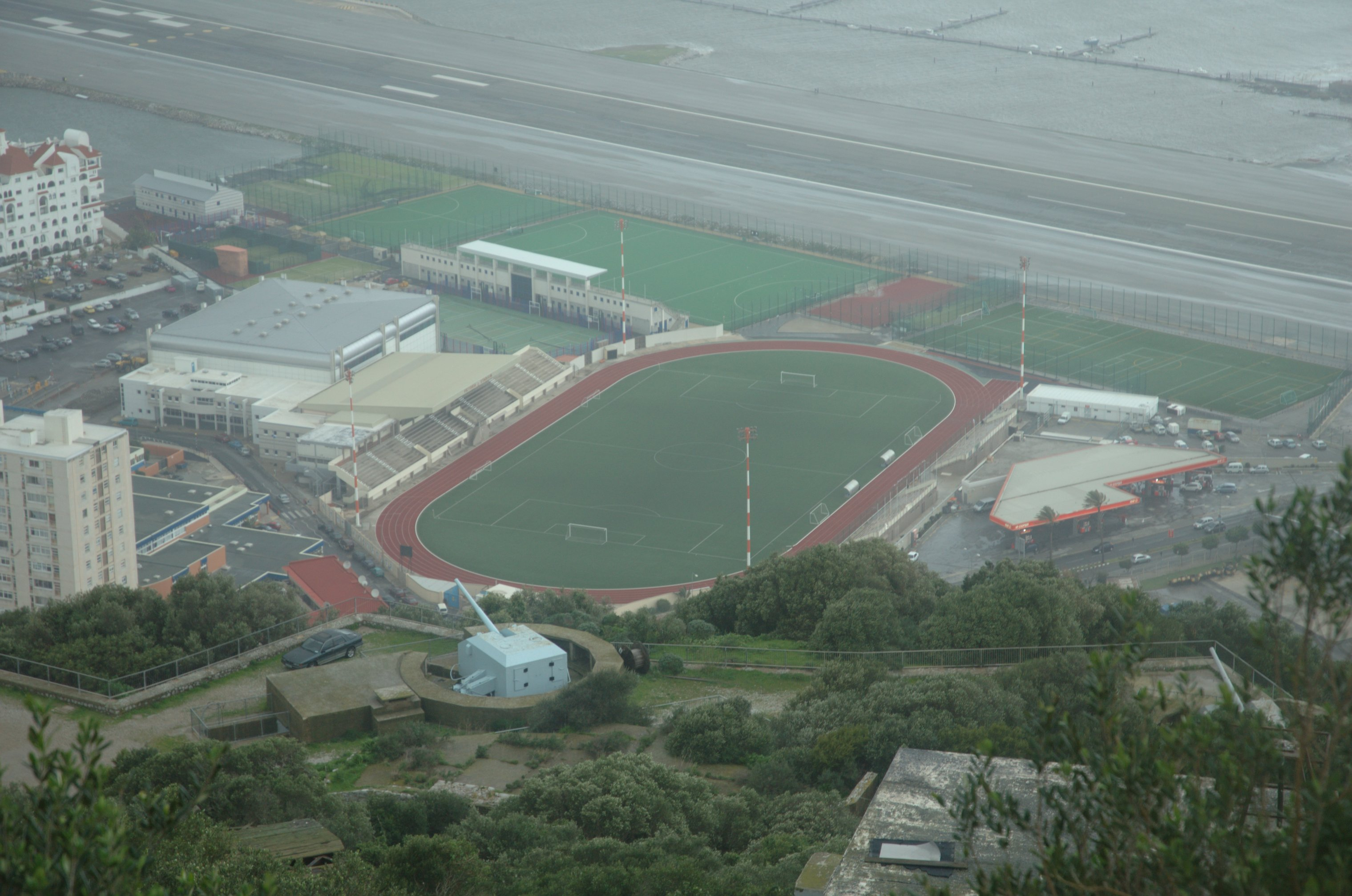
All football teams in Gibraltar share the Victoria Stadium

Gibraltar became a full member of UEFA, the governing body of association football in Europe, on 24 May 2013. Teams from the territory can qualify for UEFA's two main continental competitions, the UEFA Champions League and the UEFA Europa League, and have entered since the 2014–15 season.

Lincoln Red Imps have represented Gibraltar in four seasons of the Champions League, twice reaching the second qualifying round. In 2016, they won 1–0 at that stage against former European champions Celtic, but lost 3–1 on aggregate. The team Europa has represented the territory in the Europa League three times, their best performance being losing the second qualifying round to AIK of Sweden in 2016.

== UEFA Champions League ==
Lincoln Red Imps, after winning the Gibraltar Premier Division for the 12th consecutive time, were the first team from the territory to enter a UEFA competition, the 2014–15 UEFA Champions League. They entered in the first qualifying round, where they were drawn against HB Tórshavn, champions of the Faroe Islands. On 2 July 2014, they hosted the first leg at the Victoria Stadium, and took the lead through a penalty kick by Joseph Chipolina, but Levi Hanssen equalised in a 1–1 draw. Six days later in the second leg at Tórsvøllur, HB won 5–2 (6–3 aggregate).

In the 2015–16 UEFA Champions League, Lincoln again represented Gibraltar, and were drawn in the first qualifying round against FC Santa Coloma, the champions of Andorra. The first leg at home on 30 June 2015 was a goalless draw, then a week later they travelled to the second at the Estadi Comunal d'Andorra la Vella. Ildefons Lima put the hosts ahead before half time, but Lincoln responded with goals from Anthony Bardon and Lee Casciaro to win 2–1, becoming the first Gibraltarians to reach the second qualifying round. They lost there, 3–0 on aggregate to FC Midtjylland from Denmark.

Lincoln represented Gibraltar for a third consecutive time next season. In the first qualifying round, they were drawn against FC Flora from Estonia. In the first leg on 28 June at A Le Coq Arena in Tallinn, Chipolina scored an away goal in a 2–1 loss. Eight days later in the second leg, a Chipolina penalty and another goal by Antonio Calderón gave the team a 3–2 aggregate win. In the next round, Lincoln faced Celtic, champions of Scotland and 1967 European champions. They won the home leg 1–0 on 12 July, Casciaro scoring the only goal after 48 minutes, but lost 3–0 at Celtic Park eight days later.

Europa F.C. won the 2016–17 Gibraltar Premier Division to become the first team other than Lincoln Red Imps to play in the Champions League, and were drawn with Welsh champions The New Saints in the first qualifying round. They won the first leg 2–1 away but were eliminated after a 3–1 extra time loss at home in the second.

A new preliminary round was introduced in 2018–19 as a knockout tournament for the champions of Europe's four weakest leagues. Hosted at the Victoria Stadium, Lincoln defeated La Fiorita of San Marino but lost the final 4–1 after extra time to Drita of Kosovo.

Season	Team	Round	Opponent	Home	Away	Aggregate
2014–15	Lincoln Red Imps	1Q	(Faroe Islands) HB	1–1	2–5	3–6
2015–16	Lincoln Red Imps	1Q	(Andorra) FC Santa Coloma	0–0	2–1	2–1
2015–16	Lincoln Red Imps	2Q	(Denmark) Midtjylland	0–2	0–1	0–3
2016–17	Lincoln Red Imps	1Q	(Estonia) Flora	2–0	1–2	3–2
2016–17	Lincoln Red Imps	2Q	(Scotland) Celtic	1–0	0–3	1–3
2017–18	Europa	1Q	(Wales) The New Saints	1–3	2–1	3–4
2018–19	Lincoln Red Imps	PR	(San Marino) La Fiorita	2–0		
2018–19	Lincoln Red Imps	PR	(Kosovo) Drita	1–4 (a.e.t.)		
2019–20	Lincoln Red Imps	PR	(Kosovo) Feronikeli	0–1		
2020–21	Europa	1Q	(Serbia) Red Star Belgrade	0–5		
2021–22	Lincoln Red Imps	1Q	(Luxembourg) Fola Esch	5–0	2–2	7–2
2021–22	Lincoln Red Imps	2Q	(Romania) CFR Cluj	1–2	0–2	1–4
2022–23	Lincoln Red Imps	1Q	(North Macedonia) Shkupi	2–0	0–3	2–3
2023–24	Lincoln Red Imps	1Q	(Azerbaijan) Qarabağ	1–2	0–4	1–6
2024–25	Lincoln Red Imps	1Q	(Malta) Ħamrun Spartans	1–0	0–1 (a.e.t.)	1–1 (4–5 p)
2024–25	Lincoln Red Imps	2Q	(Azerbaijan) Qarabağ	0–2	0–5	0–7
2025–26	Lincoln Red Imps	1Q	(Faroe Islands) Víkingur Gøta	1–0	3–2	4–2
2025–26	Lincoln Red Imps	2Q	(Serbia) Red Star Belgrade	0–1	1–5	1–6
2026–27	Lincoln Red Imps	1Q	(Andorra) Inter Club d'Escaldes	3–1	1–1	4–2
2026–27	Lincoln Red Imps	2Q	(Sweden) Mjällby AIF	0–0	0–3	0–3

Notes

- PR: Preliminary round
- 1Q: First qualifying round
- 2Q: Second qualifying round

== UEFA Europa League ==
College Europa, runners-up to Lincoln in the 2014 Rock Cup, became the first Gibraltarian club to enter the UEFA Europa League, losing 4–0 on aggregate in the first qualifying round to FC Vaduz of Liechtenstein.

The following season, Europa again qualified, as league runners-up. In the first qualifying round, they faced Slovan Bratislava of Slovakia and lost 9–0 on aggregate, including 6–0 at home in the first leg, conceding a hat-trick by Karol Mészáros.

For a third consecutive season, Europa represented Gibraltar in the Europa League. Despite losing the second leg 2–1 away in Armenia, the team defeated Pyunik 3–2 on aggregate to advance for the first time. In the second qualifying round, they lost each leg by a single goal to Sweden's AIK.

In the 2017–18 UEFA Europa League, Gibraltar's entries were upgraded to two: league runners-up Lincoln Red Imps and third-placed European debutants St Joseph's. Both were drawn with Cypriot opposition in the first qualifying round and lost heavily on aggregate: 6–1 to AEK Larnaca and 10–0 to AEL Limassol respectively.

Europa and St. Joseph's both entered for Gibraltar in 2018–19. While the former was beaten comprehensively by Kosovo's Prishtina in the first qualifying round, the latter took the Faroe Islands' B36 Tórshavn to a penalty shootout, which they lost after a 2–2 aggregate draw. Lincoln Red Imps dropped from the Champions League to the second qualifying round, where they lost 3–2 on aggregate to Welsh champions The New Saints.

Season	Team	Round	Opponent	Home	Away	Aggregate
2014–15	Europa	1Q	(Liechtenstein) FC Vaduz	0–1	0–3	0–4
2015–16	Europa	1Q	(Slovakia) Slovan Bratislava	0–6	0–3	0–9
2016–17	Europa	1Q	(Armenia) Pyunik	2–0	1–2	3–2
2016–17	Europa	2Q	(Sweden) AIK	0–1	0–1	0–2
2017–18	Lincoln Red Imps	1Q	(Cyprus) AEK Larnaca	1–1	0–5	1–6
2017–18	St Joseph's	1Q	(Cyprus) AEL Limassol	0–4	0–6	0–10
2018–19	Europa	PR	(Kosovo) Prishtina	1–1	0–5	1–6
2018–19	St Joseph's	PR	(Faroe Islands) B36 Tórshavn	1–1	1–1	2–2 (2–4p)
2018–19	Lincoln Red Imps	2Q	(Wales) The New Saints	1−1	1–2	2−3
2019–20	Europa	PR	(Andorra) Sant Julià	4–0	2–3	6−3
2019–20	Europa	1Q	(Poland) Legia Warsaw	0–0	0–3	0–3
2019–20	Lincoln Red Imps	2Q	Ararat-Armenia	1–2	0–2	1–4
2019–20	St Joseph's	PR	(Kosovo) Prishtina	2–0	1–1	3–1
2019–20	St Joseph's	1Q	(Scotland) Rangers	0–4	0–6	0–10
2020–21	Lincoln Red Imps	PR	(Kosovo) Prishtina	3–0 (Awarded)	N/A	3−0
2020–21	Lincoln Red Imps	1Q	(Luxembourg) Union Titus Pétange	2–0	N/A	2–0
2020–21	Lincoln Red Imps	2Q	(Scotland) Rangers	0–5	N/A	0–5
2020–21	St Joseph's	PR	(Faroe Islands) B36 Tórshavn	1–2	N/A	1–2
2020–21	Europa	1Q	(Sweden) Djurgården	1–2	N/A	1−2
2021–22	Lincoln Red Imps	3Q	(Slovakia) Slovan Bratislava	1–3	1–1	2−4
2024–25	Lincoln Red Imps	3Q	(Belarus) Dinamo Minsk	0–2	2–1	2−3
2025–26	Lincoln Red Imps	3Q	(Armenia) Noah	1–1	0–0 (a.e.t.)	2−3 (6–5p)
2025–26	Lincoln Red Imps	PO	(Portugal) Braga	0–4	1–5	1−9
2026–27	Lincoln Red Imps	3Q	(Cyprus) Omonia	1–1	0–1	1–2

Notes

- PR: Preliminary round
- 1Q: First qualifying round
- 2Q: Second qualifying round
- 3Q: Third qualifying round
- PO: Play-off round

== UEFA Conference League ==
With the introduction of UEFA's third-tier continental competition, the UEFA Conference League, enabling a league champion to qualify for its group stage by winning only two of the four ties they would face in qualifying, Lincoln Red Imps thus became the first Gibraltarian club to qualify for the group stage of a European competition, during the UEFA Conference League's debut season.

Season	Team	Round	Opponent	Home	Away	Aggregate
2021–22	Europa	1Q	(Lithuania) Kauno Žalgiris	0–0	0–2	0–2
2021–22	Mons Calpe	1Q	(Andorra) Santa Coloma	1–1	0–4	1–5
2021–22	St Joseph's	1Q	(Estonia) FCI Levadia	1–1	1–3	2–4
2021–22	Lincoln Red Imps	PO	(Latvia) Riga	3–1	1–1	4–2 (a.e.t.)
2021–22	Lincoln Red Imps	GS	(Denmark) Copenhagen	0–4	1–3	4th
2021–22	Lincoln Red Imps	GS	(Greece) PAOK	0–2	0–2	4th
2021–22	Lincoln Red Imps	GS	(Slovakia) Slovan Bratislava	1–4	0–2	4th
2022–23	Europa	1Q	(Faroe Islands) Víkingur	1–2	0–1	1–3
2022–23	Bruno's Magpies	1Q	(Northern Ireland) Crusaders	2–1	1–3	2–4
2022–23	St Joseph's	1Q	(Northern Ireland) Larne	0–0	1–0	1–0
2022–23	St Joseph's	2Q	(Czech Republic) Slavia Prague	0–4	0–7	0–11
2022–23	Lincoln Red Imps	2Q	(Kazakhstan) Tobol	0–1	0–2	0–3
2023–24	Bruno's Magpies	1Q	(Republic of Ireland) Dundalk	0–0	1–3	1–3
2023–24	Europa	1Q	(Kosovo) Dukagjini	2–3	1–2	3–5
2023–24	Lincoln Red Imps	2Q	Bye			
2023–24	Lincoln Red Imps	3Q	(Kosovo) Ballkani	1–3	0–2	1–5
2024–25	St Joseph's	1Q	(Republic of Ireland) Shelbourne	1–1	1–2	2–3
2024–25	Bruno's Magpies	1Q	(Republic of Ireland) Derry City	2–0	1–2	3–2
2024–25	Bruno's Magpies	2Q	(Denmark) Copenhagen	0–3	1–5	1–8
2024–25	Lincoln Red Imps	PO	(Northern Ireland) Larne	2–1	1–3	3–4
2025–26	Bruno's Magpies	1Q	(Estonia) Paide Linnameeskond	2–3	1–4	3–7
2025–26	St Joseph's	1Q	(Northern Ireland) Cliftonville	2–2	3–2 (a.e.t.)	5–4
2025–26	St Joseph's	2Q	(Republic of Ireland) Shamrock Rovers	0–4	0–0	0–4
2025–26	Lincoln Red Imps	LP	(Bosnia and Herzegovina) Zrinjski Mostar	—	0–5	26th
2025–26	Lincoln Red Imps	LP	(Poland) Lech Poznań	2–1	—	26th
2025–26	Lincoln Red Imps	LP	(Croatia) Rijeka	1–1	—	26th
2025–26	Lincoln Red Imps	LP	(Malta) Hamrun Spartans	—	1–3	26th
2025–26	Lincoln Red Imps	LP	(Czech Republic) Sigma Olomouc	2–1	—	26th
2025–26	Lincoln Red Imps	LP	(Poland) Legia Warsaw	—	1–4	26th
2026–27	Europa	1Q	(North Macedonia) Shkëndija	2–3	1–4	0–6
2026–27	St Joseph's	1Q	(Republic of Ireland) Bohemian	0–0	0–2	0–2
2026–27	Lincoln Red Imps	PO	(Northern Ireland) Larne	0–2	3–0	3–2
2026–27	Lincoln Red Imps	LP	(Norway) Brann	—N/a	1–2	TBD
2026–27	Lincoln Red Imps	LP	(Netherlands) Twente	22 Oct	—N/a	TBD
2026–27	Lincoln Red Imps	LP	(Croatia) Hajduk Split	5 Nov	—N/a	TBD
2026–27	Lincoln Red Imps	LP	(Albania) Egnatia	—N/a	26 Nov	TBD
2026–27	Lincoln Red Imps	LP	(Denmark) Midtjylland	10 Dec	—N/a	TBD
2026–27	Lincoln Red Imps	LP	(France) Monaco	—N/a	17 Dec	TBD

Notes

- PR: Preliminary round
- 1Q: First qualifying round
- 2Q: Second qualifying round
- 3Q: Third qualifying round
- PO: Play-off round
- GS: Group stage
- LP: League phase
