= Lincoln Red Imps F.C. 1–0 Celtic F.C. =

Football match on 12 July 2016

Lincoln Red Imps 1–0 Celtic
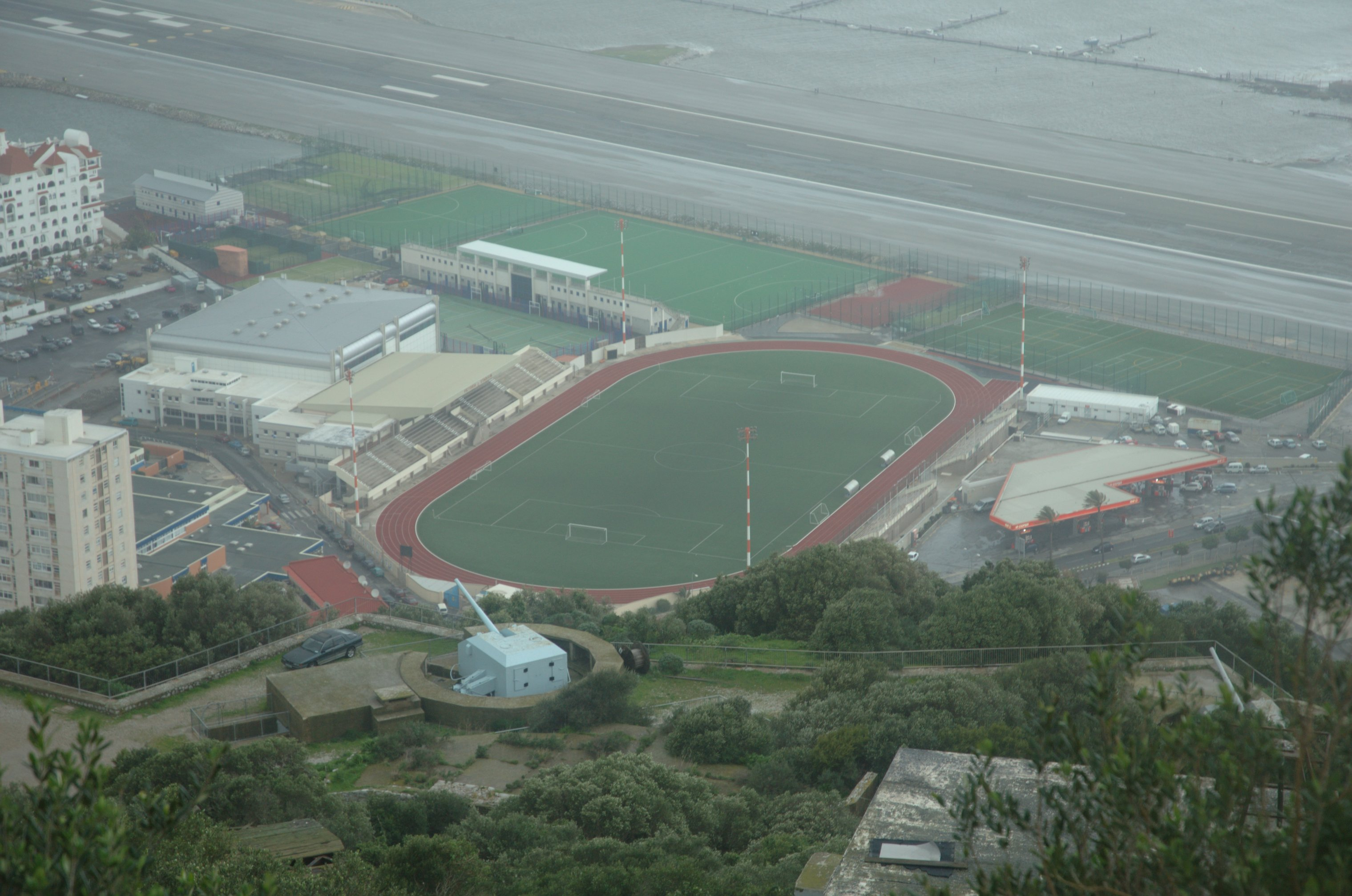
- Aerial view of Victoria Stadium, Gibraltar
- Event: 2016–17 UEFA Champions League second qualifying round – First leg
Lincoln Red Imps	Celtic
(Gibraltar)	(Scotland)
1	0
- Date: 12 July 2016
- Venue: Victoria Stadium, Gibraltar
- Referee: Andreas Ekberg (Sweden)
- Attendance: 1,632

Lincoln Red Imps vs Celtic was a football match played on 12 July 2016 at Victoria Stadium, Gibraltar. The match was a UEFA Champions League second qualifying round tie between Lincoln Red Imps, the champions of the 2015–16 Gibraltar Premier Division and Celtic, winners of the 2015–16 Scottish Premiership. The result, a 1–0 victory for Lincoln, is considered one of the greatest shocks in European football, and has been described by some media outlets as possibly Celtic's most humiliating defeat, dubbing it the Shock of Gibraltar.

At the time, the Gibraltar Premier Division was among the lowest-ranked football leagues in the UEFA coefficient, partly due to Gibraltarian clubs only participating in UEFA competition since 2014–15 and the coefficient taking the previous five seasons into account, while in the previous season Celtic had competed in the Europa League group stage.

== Build-up ==
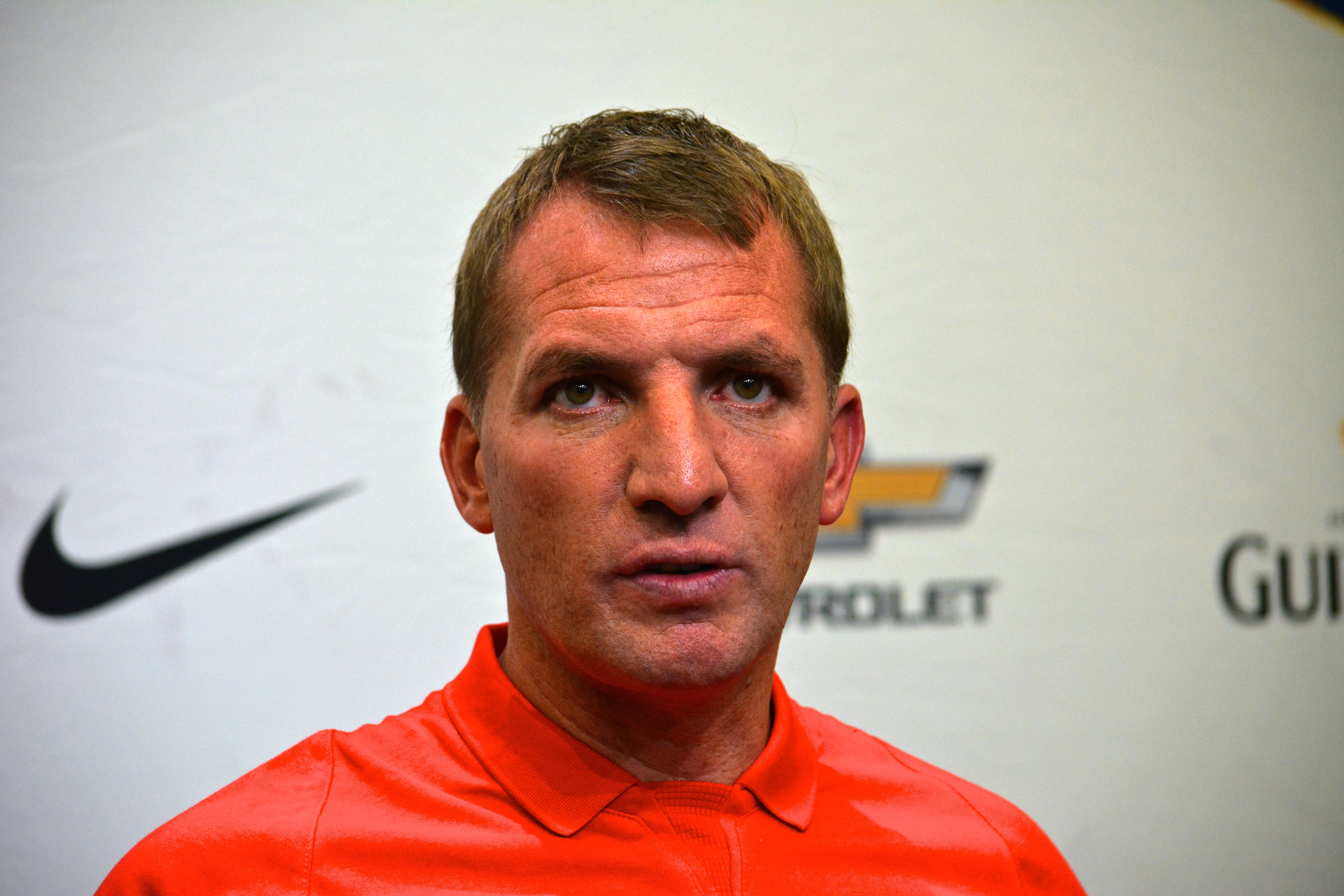
The match was Brendan Rodgers' first competitive match in charge of Celtic.

After victory in the Gibraltar Premier Division, Lincoln Red Imps under Uruguayan coach Julio César Ribas went into the tie having won 14 successive league titles, equaling a European record. As one of the lowest ranked teams in the UEFA Champions League, they entered in the first qualifying round where they faced Estonian side FC Flora. Despite a 2–1 defeat in Tallinn, a 2–0 victory in Gibraltar sent them through to the second qualifying round to face Celtic.

Celtic themselves had been on a run of 6 successive Scottish titles, however, after a disappointing season in cup competition, head coach Ronny Deila resigned and was replaced by former Liverpool manager Brendan Rodgers. As Celtic received a bye to the second qualifying round, the tie against Lincoln Red Imps was his first competitive game in charge of The Bhoys.

== Match ==
=== Summary ===
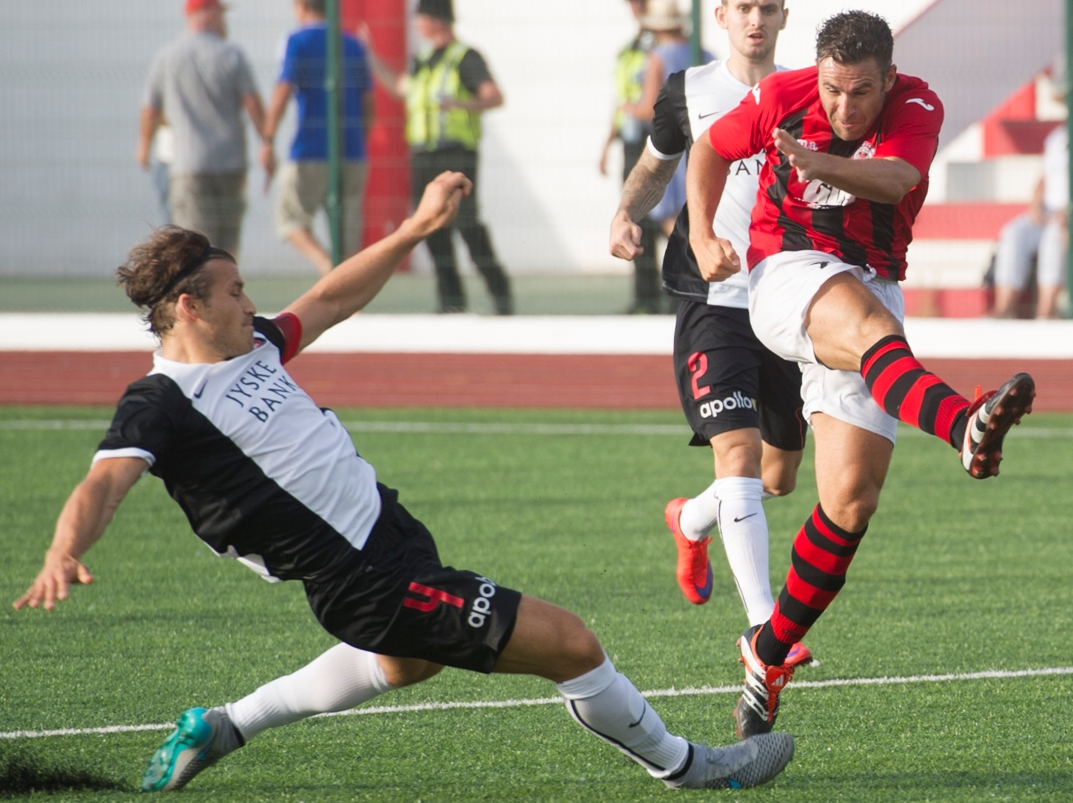
Lee Casciaro (right) scored the only goal of the match.

In Lincoln's matchday squad, eight players were full internationals for the Gibraltar national football team. Starting up front was Lee Casciaro, who scored Gibraltar's first ever competitive goal in a 6–1 loss against Scotland at Hampden Park in March 2015. Celtic's starting 11 contained the previous season's top scorer Leigh Griffiths as well as new signing Moussa Dembélé in attack. The first half saw the visitors dominate possession. Despite a disallowed goal from Moussa Dembélé after a foul on Raúl Navas, the two sides went in goalless at half-time.

In the second half, Celtic's slow start was quickly punished when Lee Casciaro latched onto a through ball from midfield, outsmarting Efe Ambrose before firing a low shot past Craig Gordon. Shortly afterwards, Antonio Calderon fired a shot over the crossbar while Celtic were still reeling from going behind. The introductions of James Forrest, Stuart Armstrong and Nadir Çiftçi failed to turn the tide in favour of Celtic, however, as Griffiths could only strike the crossbar twice as Lincoln held out for a shock victory.

=== Details ===
12 July 2016
20:00 UTC+2

Lincoln Red Imps (Gibraltar)	1–0	(Scotland) Celtic
L. Casciaro 48'	Report

Victoria Stadium, Gibraltar
Attendance: 1,632
Referee: Andreas Ekberg (Sweden)

Lincoln Red Imps	Celtic

GK	1	(Spain) Raúl Navas
RB	2	(Gibraltar) Jean-Carlos Garcia
CB	14	(Gibraltar) Roy Chipolina (c)
CB	5	(Gibraltar) Ryan Casciaro
LB	3	(Gibraltar) Joseph Chipolina
DM	6	(Portugal) Bernardo Lopes
RM	20	(Spain) Yeray Patiño	(substituted off) 90+4'
LM	19	(Spain) Antonio Calderón
AM	88	(Gibraltar) Liam Walker	(substituted off) 86'
AM	10	(Gibraltar) Kyle Casciaro
CF	7	(Gibraltar) Lee Casciaro	(substituted off) 74'
Substitutes:
GK	13	(Spain) Manuel Soler
DF	16	(Spain) Chechu
DF	18	(Gibraltar) Kenneth Chipolina	(substituted on) 90+4'
MF	4	(Gibraltar) Anthony Bardon	(substituted on) 86'
MF	22	(Gibraltar) Leon Clinton
MF	86	(Portugal) Fernando Livramento
FW	11	(Gibraltar) George Cabrera	(substituted on) 74'
Manager:
(Uruguay) Julio César Ribas

GK	1	(Scotland) Craig Gordon
RB	22	(Switzerland) Saidy Janko
CB	4	(Nigeria) Efe Ambrose
CB	28	(Denmark) Erik Sviatchenko
LB	63	(Scotland) Kieran Tierney
CM	18	(Australia) Tom Rogic	(substituted off) 58'
CM	8	(Scotland) Scott Brown (c)
CM	6	(Israel) Nir Bitton
RF	9	(Scotland) Leigh Griffiths
CF	10	(France) Moussa Dembélé	(substituted off) 74'
LF	17	(Scotland) Ryan Christie	(substituted off) 57'
Substitutes:
GK	38	(Italy) Leo Fasan
DF	23	(Sweden) Mikael Lustig
MF	14	(Scotland) Stuart Armstrong	(substituted on) 58'
MF	42	(Scotland) Callum McGregor
MF	49	(Scotland) James Forrest	(substituted on) 57'
FW	7	(Turkey) Nadir Çiftçi	(substituted on) 74'
FW	27	(England) Patrick Roberts
Manager:
(Northern Ireland) Brendan Rodgers

== Aftermath ==
Immediately after the match, many sports media outlets described it as one of Celtic's most embarrassing defeats, as well as one of the greatest shocks in European football history: The Scotsman described Celtic's defeat as a "humiliation", whilst The Guardian dubbed the result as "The Shock of Gibraltar". However, in spite of the result, Celtic went on to win the return leg 3–0 at Celtic Park.

Over the course of the rest of the season, Celtic would only go on to lose four more times; to Hapoel Be'er Sheva, Borussia Mönchengladbach and Barcelona (twice), all in the Champions League group stage. They went undefeated domestically and won the domestic treble in Rodgers' first season in charge. Speaking in 2019, Celtic's then-captain Scott Brown bemoaned the build-up to the game, as well as the condition of the pitch. He claimed that the result left a "scar" on the club.

Conversely, Lincoln's fortunes declined after the defeat to Celtic in the second leg. After losing talisman Liam Walker to arch-rivals Europa followed by a defeat in the Pepe Reyes Cup, Lincoln found themselves locked in a tight championship race that eventually saw Europa come out on top on the last day. The miserable season was compounded when Europa defeated Lincoln in the 2017 Rock Cup final, to win a domestic treble of their own.

== See also ==
- Progrès Niederkorn 2–0 Rangers
