= Alejandro Varela =

Spanish footballer

Personal information
- Full name: Alejandro Varela López
- Date of birth: 5 October 1973 (age 53)
- Place of birth: Alicante, Spain
- Height: 1.80 m (5 ft 11 in)
- Position: Right back

Team information
- Current team: Lion City Sailors (Assistant Coach)

Youth career
- –1992: Hércules

Senior career*
| Years | Team | Apps | (Gls) |
| 1992–1994 | Mutxamel CF | | |
| 1994–1997 | Hércules | 48 | (1) |
| 1997–1999 | Toledo | 58 | (0) |
| 1999–2000 | Mérida | 8 | (0) |
| 2000–2001 | Hércules | 21 | (3) |
| 2001–2006 | Cádiz | 157 | (2) |
| 2006–2007 | Ciudad de Murcia | 29 | (0) |
| 2007–2008 | Orihuela | 5 | (0) |
| Total | | 326 | (6) |

Managerial career
- 2009–2010: Balón de Cádiz
- 2010–2011: Domingo Savio Juvenil
- 2015–2016: Conil
- 2022–2025: Iraq (assistant)
- 2026–: Lion City Sailors (assistant)
- * Club domestic league appearances and goals as of 13 March 2021

Alejandro Varela López (born 29 June 1979) is a Spanish former professional footballer who played as a right back, and later worked as a manager. who is the assistant coach of Singapore Premier League club Lion City Sailors.

== Career ==
Varela was born in Alicante in the Valencian Community, and began his career in the youth teams of local side Hércules. He joined Mutxamel CF in the Tercera División in 1992, before returning to the Hércules first team two years later. He was an important part of the team that won the Segunda División title in 1995–96, earning promotion to La Liga. He left the club after their first season in the top flight, which ended in relegation, having made 54 appearances in all competitions, including 21 first division matches, scoring once. He joined Toledo in 1997, where he made 63 appearances in two Segunda División campaigns. He then signed for Mérida, playing nine matches during a turbulent 1999–2000 season, which would prove to be the Extremadurans' last in existence. The club declared bankruptcy and folded that summer.

Following the demise of Mérida, Varela returned for a third spell at Hércules, adding 21 Segunda División B appearances and three goals during one season at the club. He joined fellow third tier side Cádiz in 2001, and helped them to promotion via the play-offs in 2002–03. Two years later, he won the second Segunda División title of his career, and Cádiz were promoted to La Liga after a twelve-year absence. Like Varela's previous top flight experience nine years before, Cádiz were relegated after one season, and he left the club that summer with 170 appearances and two goals across five seasons. His next destination was Ciudad de Murcia, and he played 30 matches for the Segunda División side during 2006–07.

For the second time in his career, his season with Murcia was the last in the club's existence, as they relocated to Granada, becoming Granada 74, that summer. This prompted Varela to join Orihuela in Segunda División B, with whom he made five appearances in one season, before retiring in 2008 at the age of 35.

== Coaching career ==
In 2009, Varela returned to Cádiz as coach of their C team, Balón de Cádiz. During the 2009–10 season, he was the coach of youth team Domingo Savio Juvenil. In November 2015, Varela was appointed manager of Conil CF in the Tercera División. He was dismissed after fourteen games in February 2016, with the club eight points from safety in the relegation zone, and replaced by Chico Segundo.

== Personal life ==
Varela's father Pepe was also a footballer, representing both Málaga and Hércules in La Liga during the 1970s.

== Honours ==
Hércules

- Segunda División: 1995–96

Cádiz

- Segunda División: 2004–05

== Career statistics ==
As of 14 March 2021

| Club | Season | League | | | Cup | | Other | | Total | |
| Club | Season | Division | Apps | Goals | Apps | Goals | Apps | Goals | Apps | Goals |
|---|---|---|---|---|---|---|---|---|---|---|
| Hércules | 1994–95 | Segunda División | 7 | 1 | – | | – | | 7 | 1 |
| Hércules | 1995–96 | Segunda División | 20 | 0 | 4 | 0 | – | | 24 | 0 |
| Hércules | 1996–97 | La Liga | 21 | 0 | 2 | 0 | – | | 23 | 0 |
| Hércules | Total | | 48 | 1 | 6 | 0 | 0 | 0 | 54 | 1 |
| Toledo | 1997–98 | Segunda División | 36 | 0 | 4 | 0 | – | | 40 | 0 |
| Toledo | 1998–99 | Segunda División | 22 | 0 | 1 | 0 | – | | 23 | 0 |
| Toledo | Total | | 58 | 0 | 5 | 0 | 0 | 0 | 63 | 0 |
| Mérida | 1999–2000 | Segunda División | 8 | 0 | 1 | 0 | – | | 9 | 0 |
| Hércules | 2000–01 | Segunda División B | 21 | 3 | 0 | 0 | – | | 21 | 3 |
| Hércules total | | | 69 | 4 | 6 | 0 | 0 | 0 | 75 | 4 |
| Cádiz | 2001–02 | Segunda División B | 32 | 1 | 2 | 0 | – | | 34 | 1 |
| Cádiz | 2002–03 | Segunda División B | 24 | 0 | – | | 6 | 0 | 30 | 0 |
| Cádiz | 2003–04 | Segunda División | 26 | 0 | 2 | 0 | – | | 28 | 0 |
| Cádiz | 2004–05 | Segunda División | 40 | 1 | 1 | 0 | – | | 41 | 1 |
| Cádiz | 2005–06 | La Liga | 35 | 0 | 2 | 0 | – | | 37 | 0 |
| Cádiz | Total | | 157 | 2 | 7 | 0 | 6 | 0 | 170 | 2 |
| Ciudad de Murcia | 2006–07 | Segunda División | 29 | 0 | 1 | 0 | – | | 30 | 0 |
| Orihuela | 2007–08 | Segunda División B | 5 | 0 | – | | – | | 5 | 0 |
| Career total | | | 326 | 6 | 20 | 0 | 6 | 0 | 352 | 6 |

1. Appearances in the 2003 Segunda División B play-offs
