= 2004–05 SD Eibar season =

Eibar
2004–05 season
- President: Jaime Barriuso
- Head coach: José Luis Mendilibar
- Stadium: Ipurua
- Segunda División: 4th
- Copa del Rey: Round of 64

The 2004–05 season was the 65th season in the history of SD Eibar and the club's 12th consecutive season in the second division of Spanish football. In addition to the domestic league, SD Eibar participated in this season's edition of the Copa del Rey.

== Pre-season and friendlies ==
Win Draw Loss

== Competitions ==
=== Overall record ===
Competition	First match	Last match	Starting round	Final position	Record							
Competition	First match	Last match	Starting round	Final position	Pld	W	D	L	GF	GA	GD	Win %
Segunda División	28 August 2004	18 June 2005	Matchday 1	4th	42	20	13	9	53	39	+14	47.62
Copa del Rey	27 October 2004		Round of 64	Round of 64	1	0	1	0	0	0	+0	0.00
Total					43	20	14	9	53	39	+14	46.51

Source: Competitions

=== Segunda División ===
==== League table ====
Pos	Team	Pld	W	D	L	GF	GA	GD	Pts	Promotion or relegation
2	Celta de Vigo (P)	42	22	10	10	55	38	+17	76 (Note: CÁD: 9 pts; CEL: 4 pts → CEL 2-2 ALA; ALA: 4 pts → ALA 0-3 CEL)	Promotion to La Liga
3	Alavés (P)	42	23	7	12	62	47	+15	76	Promotion to La Liga
4	Eibar	42	20	13	9	53	39	+14	73	
5	Recreativo	42	19	14	9	48	32	+16	71	
6	Valladolid	42	18	9	15	56	56	0	63	

Source: LFP – Liga Adelante
Rules for classification: 1st points; 2nd head-to-head points; 3rd head-to-head goal difference; 4th head-to-head goals scored; 5th goal difference; 6th number of goals scored; 7th Fair-play points
(P) Promoted

==== Results summary ====
Overall								Home						Away					
Pld	W	D	L	GF	GA	GD	Pts	W	D	L	GF	GA	GD	W	D	L	GF	GA	GD
34	19	10	5	49	35	+14	67	12	4	1	29	15	+14	7	6	4	20	20	0

==== Results by round ====
Round	1	2	3	4	5	6	7	8	9	10	11	12	13	14	15	16	17	18	19	20	21	22	23	24	25	26	27	28	29	30	31	32	33	34	35	36	37	38	39	40	41	42
Ground	H	A	H	A	H	A	H	A	H	A	H	A	A	H	A	H	A	H	A	H	A	A	H	A	H	A	H	A	H	A	H	A	H	H	A	H	A	H	A	H	A	H
Result	W	D	W	L	W	L	W	D	W	W	W	W	W	D	L	L	D	L	L	W	W	W	D	W	D	D	W	W	D	D	L	W	D	L	D	W	L	W	D	W	W	D
Position	4	5	3	11	4	8	4	6	3	2	1	1	1	1	2	2	3	4	6	4	4	2	3	2	4	3	2	2	2	3	3	3	3	4	5	4	5	5	5	5	4	5

A = Away; H = Home; W = Win; D = Draw; L = Loss

==== Matches ====
28 August 2004 1	Eibar	2–1	Cádiz	Eibar
				Stadium: Ipurua

5 September 2004 2	Málaga B	0–0	Eibar	Málaga

12 September 2004 3	Eibar	2–1	Salamanca	Eibar
				Stadium: Ipurua

18 September 2004 4	Poli Ejido	4–1	Eibar	El Ejido

26 September 2004 5	Eibar	1–0	Córdoba	Eibar
				Stadium: Ipurua

3 October 2004 6	Elche	1–0	Eibar	Elche

9 October 2004 7	Eibar	2–0	Valladolid	Eibar
				Stadium: Ipurua

16 October 2004 8	Tenerife	1–1	Eibar	Santa Cruz de Tenerife

23 October 2004 9	Eibar	3–2	Ciudad de Murcia	Eibar
				Stadium: Ipurua

31 October 2004 10	Pontevedra	2–3	Eibar	Pontevedra

6 November 2004 11	Eibar	1–0	Terrassa	Eibar
				Stadium: Ipurua

14 November 2004 12	Xerez	0–3	Eibar	Jerez de la Frontera

21 November 2004 13	Alavés	0–2	Eibar	Vitoria-Gasteiz

28 November 2004 14	Eibar	1–1	Lleida	Eibar
				Stadium: Ipurua

5 December 2004 15	Almería	2–1	Eibar	Gijón

11 December 2004 16	Eibar	0–2	Gimnàstic	Eibar
				Stadium: Ipurua

18 December 2004 17	Sporting Gijón	0–0	Eibar	Gijón

21 December 2004 18	Eibar	1–2	Recreativo	Eibar
				Stadium: Ipurua

9 January 2005 19	Murcia	1–0	Eibar	Murcia

15 January 2005 20	Eibar	2–1	Celta Vigo	Eibar
				Stadium: Ipurua

22 January 2005 21	Racing Ferrol	0–1	Eibar	Ferrol

30 January 2005 22	Cádiz	1–2	Eibar	Cádiz

6 February 2005 23	Eibar	0–0	Málaga B	Eibar
				Stadium: Ipurua

13 February 2005 24	Salamanca	1–2	Eibar	Salamanca

20 February 2005 25	Eibar	0–0	Poli Ejido	Eibar
				Stadium: Ipurua

6 March 2005 27	Eibar	5–2	Elche	Eibar
				Stadium: Ipurua

9 March 2005 26	Córdoba	0–0	Eibar	Córdoba

13 March 2005 28	Valladolid	1–2	Eibar	Valladolid

19 March 2005 29	Eibar	0–0	Tenerife	Eibar
				Stadium: Ipurua

27 March 2005 30	Ciudad de Murcia	1–1	Eibar	Murcia

3 April 2005 31	Eibar	1–2	Pontevedra	Eibar
				Stadium: Ipurua

10 April 2005 32	Terrassa	2–3	Eibar	Terrassa

16 April 2005 33	Eibar	0–0	Xerez	Eibar
				Stadium: Ipurua

23 April 2005 34	Eibar	1–2	Alavés	Eibar
				Stadium: Ipurua

1 May 2005 35	Lleida	1–1	Eibar	Lleida

7 May 2005 36	Eibar	1–0	Almería	Eibar
				Stadium: Ipurua

14 May 2005 37	Gimnàstic	3–2	Eibar	Tarragona

21 May 2005 38	Eibar	1–0	Sporting Gijón	Eibar
				Stadium: Ipurua

29 May 2005 39	Recreativo	0–0	Eibar	Huelva

5 June 2005 40	Eibar	1–0	Murcia	Eibar
				Stadium: Ipurua

12 June 2005 41	Celta Vigo	1–2	Eibar	Vigo

18 June 2005 42	Eibar	1–1	Racing Ferrol	Eibar
				Stadium: Ipurua
