= Javier Acuña =

Paraguayan football player (born 1988)

Personal information
- Full name: Carlos Javier Acuña Caballero
- Date of birth: 23 June 1988 (age 38)
- Place of birth: Encarnación, Paraguay
- Height: 1.75 m (5 ft 9 in)
- Position: Forward

Team information
- Current team: Athletic Torrellano

Youth career
- 2001–2002: 22 de Septiembre
- 2002–2004: Olimpia
- 2004–2006: Cádiz

Senior career*
Years	Team	Apps	(Gls)
2006–2008	Cádiz	24	(2)
2007–2008	→ Salamanca (loan)	21	(1)
2008–2013	Real Madrid B	26	(7)
2010–2011	→ Recreativo (loan)	12	(1)
2011–2013	→ Girona (loan)	56	(21)
2013	Udinese	0	(0)
2013–2014	Watford	9	(0)
2014	→ Osasuna (loan)	16	(3)
2014–2016	Olimpia	34	(5)
2015–2016	→ Mallorca (loan)	20	(0)
2016–2017	Numancia	15	(0)
2017	Ratchaburi	15	(6)
2018–2020	Albacete	81	(6)
2020–2022	Hércules	23	(3)
2022–2023	Gimnástica Segoviana	24	(5)
2023–2025	Betis Florida	42	(35)
2025–	Athletic Torrellano	7	(1)

International career
2004	Paraguay U17	9	(5)
2007	Paraguay U20	9	(3)
- * Club domestic league appearances and goals as of 9 November 2025

Carlos Javier Acuña Caballero (born 23 June 1988) is a Paraguayan professional footballer who plays as a forward for Spanish Tercera Federación club Athletic Torrellano.

== Club career ==
Acuña was born in Encarnación. In 2004, he helped Paraguay win the Under-16 South American Championship, also topping the goal charts. He was immediately bought by Cádiz CF of Spain for a club record of around 100 million pesetas, but had to wait one year in the sidelines, however, to make his official debut, as the Andalusians already had their foreign-players quota full.

From 2006 to 2008, Acuña represented Cádiz and UD Salamanca, both in the second division (the latter on loan). On 16 December 2008, Real Madrid confirmed an agreement for the transfer of the player for five years; he was immediately sent to the B-side, in the third level.

Subsequently, Acuña played three seasons in the Spanish second level, with Recreativo de Huelva and Girona FC. He scored a career-best 17 goals – plus one in the unsuccessful promotion playoffs – with the latter in the 2012–13 campaign.

After seeing out his contract at Real Madrid, Acuña was signed by Serie A's Udinese Calcio in late June 2013. However, within a matter of weeks, he moved to sister club Watford on a three-year contract. He scored his first goal for his new team on 24 September, in a 2–3 home loss to Norwich City for the season's League Cup.

In early January 2014, Acuña returned to Spain, being loaned to CA Osasuna until June. He made his La Liga debut on the 12th, playing the last 32 minutes of a 2–1 away win over Real Betis.

Acuña returned to his country on 1 August 2014, signing with Club Olimpia for an undisclosed fee. On 30 July 2015, he was loaned to RCD Mallorca for one year.

On 17 June 2016, Acuña signed a two-year deal with CD Numancia also in the Spanish second tier. On 2 January 2018, after a six-month spell in Thailand with Ratchaburi Mitr Phol FC, he joined Albacete Balompié for the remainder of the season. On 4 December 2018 he renewed his contract with the club until 2021.

On 31 August 2020, Acuña signed with Hércules CF.

== Career statistics ==
=== Club ===
As of match played 13 December 2020

Appearances and goals by club, season and competition
Club	Season	League			National Cup		League Cup		Other		Total	
Club	Season	Division	Apps	Goals	Apps	Goals	Apps	Goals	Apps	Goals	Apps	Goals
Cádiz	2004–05	Segunda División	0	0	0	0	—		—		0	0
Cádiz	2005–06	La Liga	0	0	0	0	—		—		0	0
Cádiz	2006–07	Segunda División	23	2	1	0	—		—		24	2
Cádiz	2007–08	Segunda División	0	0	0	0	—		—		0	0
Cádiz	2008–09	Segunda División B	1	0	1	0	—		—		2	0
Cádiz	Total		24	2	2	0	0	0	0	0	26	2
Salamanca (loan)	2007–08	Segunda División	21	1	1	1	—		—		22	2
Real Madrid B	2008–09	Segunda División B	18	6	—		—		—		18	6
Real Madrid B	2009–10	Segunda División B	8	1	—		—		—		8	1
Real Madrid B	Total		26	7	0	0	0	0	0	0	26	7
Real Madrid	2009–10	La Liga	0	0	0	0	—		—		0	0
Recreativo (loan)	2010–11	Segunda División	12	1	1	0	—		—		13	1
Girona (loan)	2011–12	Segunda División	17	4	0	0	—		—		17	4
Girona (loan)	2012–13	Segunda División	36	16	1	0	—		3 (Note: Appearance(s) in La Liga Promotion)	1	40	17
Girona (loan)	Total		53	20	1	0	0	0	3	1	57	21
Watford	2013–14	Championship	9	0	0	0	3	1	—		12	1
Osasuna(loan)	2013–14	La Liga	16	3	1	0	—		—		17	3
Olimpia	2014	Paraguayan Primera División	19	5	—		—		—		19	5
Olimpia	2015	Paraguayan Primera División	15	0	—		—		—		15	0
Olimpia	Total		34	5	0	0	0	0	0	0	34	5
Mallorca (loan)	2015–16	Segunda División	20	0	1	0	—		—		21	0
Numancia	2016–17	Segunda División	15	0	1	0	—		—		16	0
Ratchaburi	2017	Thai League 1	15	6	—		—		—		15	6
Albacete	2017–18	Segunda División	16	1	0	0	—		—		16	1
Albacete	2018–19	Segunda División	31	4	1	0	—		1	0	33	4
Albacete	2019–20	Segunda División	32	2	1	0	—		—		33	2
Albacete	Total		79	7	2	0	0	0	1	0	82	7
Hércules	2020–21	Segunda División B	3	1	0	0	—		—		3	1
Career total			327	53	10	1	3	1	4	1	344	56
