= Roberto Suárez =

Roberto Suárez may refer to:

- Roberto Suárez (publisher)
- Roberto Suárez (footballer)
- Roberto Suárez (rower)
- Roberto Suárez Gómez, Bolivian drug lord and trafficker
