= Chipolina =

Chipolina is a surname. Notable people with the surname include:

- Joseph Chipolina (born 1987), Gibraltarian footballer and admin clerk
- Kenneth Chipolina (born 1994), Gibraltarian footballer
- Roy Chipolina (born 1983), Gibraltarian footballer and customs officer
- Eric Chipolina (born 1972), French IT engineer
