= Raúl Navas =

Raúl Navas may refer to:

- Raúl Navas (footballer, born 1978), Spanish football goalkeeper
- Raúl Navas (footballer, born 1988), Spanish football defender

== See also ==
- Raúl Nava (born 1990), Mexican football forward
