= Armando Ribeiro =

Spanish footballer (born 1971)

Armando
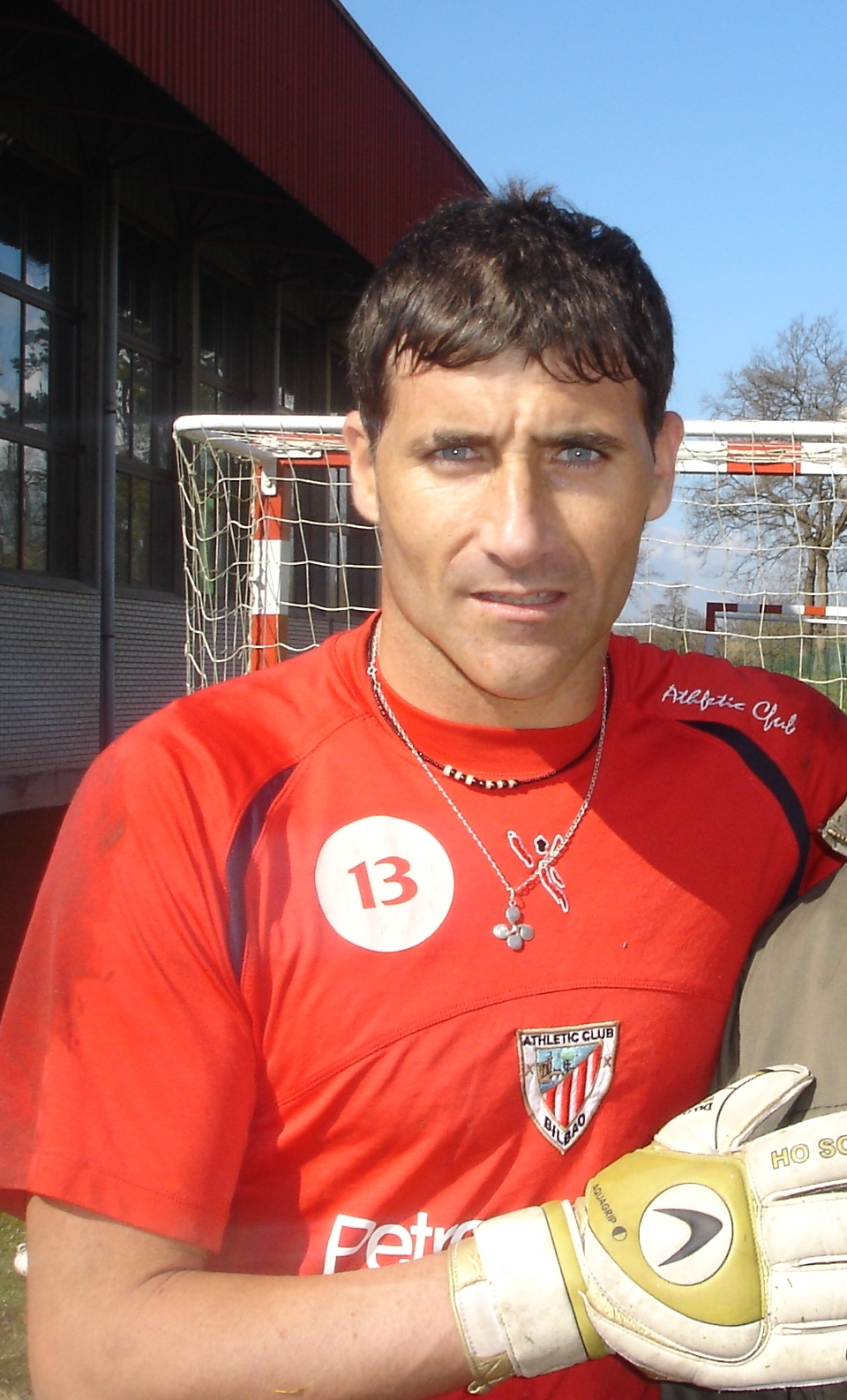
- Armando in 2009

Personal information
- Full name: Armando Ribeiro de Aguiar Malda
- Date of birth: 16 January 1971 (age 55)
- Place of birth: Sopelana, Spain
- Height: 1.80 m (5 ft 11 in)
- Position: Goalkeeper

Youth career
- 1986–1988: Ugeraga
- 1988–1990: Logroñés

Senior career*
Years	Team	Apps	(Gls)
1990–1992	Logroñés B	34	(0)
1992–1994	Sporting Gijón B	9	(0)
1994–1998	Alavés	5	(0)
1994–1995	→ Bermeo (loan)	36	(0)
1998–1999	Barakaldo	18	(0)
1999–2008	Cádiz	255	(0)
2008	→ Athletic Bilbao (loan)	16	(0)
2008–2010	Athletic Bilbao	3	(0)
Total		376	(0)

International career
2005	Basque Country	1	(0)
- * Club domestic league appearances and goals

Armando Ribeiro de Aguiar Malda (born 16 January 1971), known simply as Armando, is a Spanish former professional footballer who played as a goalkeeper.

He spent most of his 20-year senior career with Cádiz (nine seasons and 273 games, appearing in all three major levels of Spanish football), finishing it with Athletic Bilbao where he played three of his four La Liga campaigns, totalling 44 matches.

== Playing career ==
Armando was born in Sopelana, Biscay. After representing several clubs in the lower leagues, with an unassuming three-year Segunda División spell at Deportivo Alavés, he spent nine years of his career at Cádiz CF, being the second tier's Ricardo Zamora Trophy in 2004–05 and first-choice throughout most of the following season's La Liga, as the Andalusians were immediately relegated.

In January 2008, Cádiz loaned Armando to Athletic Bilbao, who had lost first-choice Gorka Iraizoz for six months due to a knee injury. In an away match against Real Betis on 15 March, he was hit by a bottle thrown by an opposing fan, with his team leading 2–1 and 20 minutes left; he needed six stitches to a wound just inches below the eye, and Athletic were later awarded the win by the Royal Spanish Football Federation.

At the end of the campaign, the loan move was made permanent by the Basques and, with Iraizoz recovered, Armando beat competition from Iñaki Lafuente and served as backup. His only two appearances in 2008–09 were on 28 February 2009 in a 2–1 home loss to Sevilla FC, as manager Joaquín Caparrós rested the entire starting squad for the Copa del Rey semi-final second leg, coincidentally also against Sevilla, and against Real Betis also at San Mamés in a 1–0 win, for the same reason (the upcoming final against FC Barcelona).

== Post-retirement ==
Armando retired at the end of 2009–10, having appeared in three matches (two in the cup and the last round of the league). His final appearance – on 15 May 2010 against Racing de Santander – set a record as the club's oldest player in the league, aged 39 years and 119 days. He immediately joined the coaching staff for the next season.

In that capacity, Armando remained several years at Athletic.

== Personal life ==
In October 2016, Armando was acting as goalkeeping coach for CD Basconia (Athletic Bilbao's youth farm team) in a match against CD Vitoria in which one of the opposition goalscorers was his son Alain. The latter, a midfielder, repeated the feat in the return fixture in March 2017.

Armando's younger son, Iban, also spent time in Athletic's youth system at Lezama and played for Danok Bat CF.

== Career statistics ==
Appearances and goals by club, season and competition
Club	Season	League			Cup		Europe		Other		Total	
Club	Season	Division	Apps	Goals	Apps	Goals	Apps	Goals	Apps	Goals	Apps	Goals
Logroñés B	1991–92	Segunda División B	34	0	—		—		—		34	0
Sporting Gijón B	1992–93	Segunda División B	9	0	—		—		—		9	0
Alavés	1993–94	Segunda División B	1	0	—		—		—		1	0
Alavés	1995–96	Segunda División	0	0	4	0	—		—		4	0
Alavés	1996–97	Segunda División	4	0	4	0	—		—		8	0
Alavés	Total		5	0	8	0	—		—		13	0
Bermeo (loan)	1994–95	Segunda División B	36	0	—		—		—		36	0
Barakaldo	1998–99	Segunda División B	18	0	—		—		—		18	0
Cádiz	1998–99	Segunda División B	16	0	—		—		—		16	0
Cádiz	1999–2000	Segunda División B	14	0	1	0	—		—		15	0
Cádiz	2000–01	Segunda División B	36	0	—		—		6	0	42	0
Cádiz	2001–02	Segunda División B	36	0	3	0	—		—		39	0
Cádiz	2002–03	Segunda División B	37	0	—		—		6	0	43	0
Cádiz	2003–04	Segunda División	15	0	1	0	—		—		16	0
Cádiz	2004–05	Segunda División	40	0	0	0	—		—		40	0
Cádiz	2005–06	La Liga	25	0	0	0	—		—		32	0
Cádiz	2006–07	Segunda División	36	0	0	0	—		—		36	0
Cádiz	2007–08	Segunda División	0	0	1	0	—		—		1	0
Cádiz	Total		255	0	6	0	—		12	0	273	0
Athletic Bilbao (loan)	2007–08	La Liga	16	0	0	0	—		—		16	0
Athletic Bilbao	2008–09	La Liga	2	0	0	0	—		—		2	0
Athletic Bilbao	2009–10	La Liga	1	0	2	0	0	0	0	0	3	0
Athletic Bilbao	Total		19	0	2	0	0	0	0	0	21	0
Career total			376	0	16	0	0	0	12	0	404	0

== Honours ==
Cádiz

- Segunda División: 2004–05

Individual

- Ricardo Zamora Trophy (Segunda División): 2004–05
