= Roberto Suárez (footballer) =

Spanish footballer (born 1974)

Personal information
- Full name: Roberto Suárez Álvarez
- Date of birth: 7 April 1974 (age 52)
- Place of birth: Grado, Spain
- Height: 1.76 m (5 ft 9 in)
- Position: Midfielder

Senior career*
| Years | Team | Apps | (Gls) |
| 1992–1993 | Real Madrid C | | |
| 1993–1997 | Real Oviedo | 106 | (1) |
| 1997–1998 | Levante | 17 | (0) |
| 1998–2000 | Toledo | 71 | (0) |
| 2000–2002 | Lleida | 49 | (0) |
| 2002–2006 | Cádiz | 127 | (1) |
| 2006–2008 | Racing Portuense | 61 | (0) |
| 2015–2016 | Marino | 16 | (0) |
| Total | | 447 | (2) |

Managerial career
- Marino (assistant)
- * Club domestic league appearances and goals

Roberto Suárez Álvarez (born 7 April 1974) is a Spanish retired footballer who played as a midfielder, and also worked as a sporting director and a coach. He played for a variety of different clubs in his homeland, including making 106 appearances in La Liga for Real Oviedo, scoring once. He later had a successful spell with Cádiz, playing 137 matches, including 23 in the top flight, and scoring one goal.

== Playing career ==
Suárez was born in Grado in the Principality of Asturias, and after a short spell with the C team of giants Real Madrid, began his career proper with Real Oviedo in his native community. He made his La Liga debut for Oviedo, aged 19, on 24 October 1993, as they visited the exalted surroundings of Camp Nou. Oviedo lost 1–0 to Barcelona, and Suárez was replaced by Juan Antonio Andrades with ten minutes to play. Suárez remained at Oviedo for four and a half seasons, before joining Levante in the Segunda División in December 1997.

Levante were relegated at the end of that season, and Suárez departed to join erstwhile second tier rivals Toledo. Toledo met the same fate in 1999–2000, and Suárez moved on again, this time joining Lleida. In his first season, he suffered a third Segunda División relegation in four seasons, but this time did stay for one further season before leaving to sign for Cádiz in 2002. At Cádiz, his fortunes began to improve, and he helped them earn promotion from Segunda División B via the play-offs in his first season. Two seasons later, Cádiz won the Segunda División title and were promoted to La Liga after a twelve-year absence. They were relegated after just one season in the top flight, and Suárez left to join Segunda División B side Racing Portuense that summer. After two years with Portuense, he retired in 2008 at the age of 34.

== Retirement ==
Suárez returned to Cádiz as their sporting director for the 2010–11 season. His contract contained a clause allowing him to automatically stay on for a second season if Cádiz finished in the Segunda División B promotion play-off places, which they achieved by placing 4th. Nonetheless, Suárez was dismissed by incoming president Quique Pina. Later, he was appointed assistant manager of Asturian club Marino.

== Return to playing ==
In 2015, the 41 year old Suárez made a shock return to playing, seven years after his retirement. He made the jump from assistant manager of Marino to one of their playing staff, and played 16 Tercera División matches before retiring for good in 2016 at the age of 42.

== Honours ==
Cádiz

- Segunda División: 2004–05

== Career statistics ==
As of 14 March 2021

| Club | Season | League | | | Cup | | Other | | Total | |
| Club | Season | Division | Apps | Goals | Apps | Goals | Apps | Goals | Apps | Goals |
|---|---|---|---|---|---|---|---|---|---|---|
| Real Oviedo | 1993–94 | La Liga | 29 | 0 | 4 | 0 | – | | 33 | 0 |
| Real Oviedo | 1994–95 | La Liga | 30 | 0 | 1 | 0 | – | | 31 | 0 |
| Real Oviedo | 1995–96 | La Liga | 38 | 1 | 4 | 0 | – | | 42 | 1 |
| Real Oviedo | 1996–97 | La Liga | 8 | 0 | 2 | 0 | – | | 10 | 0 |
| Real Oviedo | 1997–98 | La Liga | 1 | 0 | 0 | 0 | – | | 1 | 0 |
| Real Oviedo | Total | | 106 | 1 | 11 | 0 | 0 | 0 | 117 | 1 |
| Levante | 1997–98 | Segunda División | 17 | 0 | 0 | 0 | – | | 17 | 0 |
| Toledo | 1998–99 | Segunda División | 35 | 0 | 0 | 0 | – | | 35 | 0 |
| Toledo | 1999–2000 | Segunda División | 36 | 0 | 2 | 0 | – | | 38 | 0 |
| Toledo | Total | | 71 | 0 | 2 | 0 | 0 | 0 | 73 | 0 |
| Lleida | 2000–01 | Segunda División | 31 | 0 | 1 | 0 | – | | 32 | 0 |
| Lleida | 2001–02 | Segunda División B | 18 | 0 | 0 | 0 | – | | 18 | 0 |
| Lleida | Total | | 49 | 0 | 1 | 0 | 0 | 0 | 50 | 0 |
| Cádiz | 2002–03 | Segunda División B | 34 | 0 | – | | 6 | 0 | 40 | 0 |
| Cádiz | 2003–04 | Segunda División | 39 | 1 | 1 | 0 | – | | 40 | 1 |
| Cádiz | 2004–05 | Segunda División | 31 | 0 | 1 | 0 | – | | 32 | 0 |
| Cádiz | 2005–06 | La Liga | 23 | 0 | 2 | 0 | – | | 25 | 0 |
| Cádiz | Total | | 127 | 1 | 4 | 0 | 6 | 0 | 137 | 1 |
| Racing Portuense | 2006–07 | Segunda División B | 33 | 0 | 3 | 0 | 2 | 0 | 38 | 0 |
| Racing Portuense | 2007–08 | Segunda División B | 28 | 0 | 1 | 0 | – | | 29 | 0 |
| Racing Portuense | Total | | 61 | 0 | 4 | 0 | 2 | 0 | 67 | 0 |
| Marino | 2015–16 | Tercera División | 16 | 0 | – | | – | | 16 | 0 |
| Career total | | | 447 | 2 | 22 | 0 | 8 | 0 | 477 | 2 |

1. Appearances in the 2003 Segunda División B play-offs
2. Appearances in the 2007 Segunda División B play-offs
