= Roberto Cuevas =

Spanish footballer (born 1981)

Personal information
- Full name: Roberto Cuevas Martín
- Date of birth: 30 January 1981 (age 45)
- Place of birth: Abadiño, Spain
- Height: 1.70 m (5 ft 7 in)
- Position: Forward

Youth career
- 1998–1999: Athletic Bilbao

Senior career*
Years	Team	Apps	(Gls)
1999–2000	Basconia		
2000–2003	Bilbao Athletic	79	(12)
2003–2004	Eibar	34	(4)
2004–2006	Ciudad Murcia	52	(4)
2006–2008	Mérida	63	(16)
2008–2009	Alavés	28	(3)
2009–2011	Eibar	46	(6)
2011–2012	Amorebieta	25	(4)
2012–2018	Balmaseda	96	(28)
- * Club domestic league appearances and goals

Roberto Cuevas Martín (born 30 January 1981) is a Spanish former professional footballer who played as a forward.
