= Javi Jiménez (footballer, born 1979) =

Spanish footballer

Personal information
- Full name: Javier Jiménez Santafé
- Date of birth: 21 January 1979 (age 47)
- Place of birth: Santa Coloma, Spain
- Height: 1.74 m (5 ft 9 in)
- Position: Attacking midfielder

Youth career
- 1995–1998: Gramenet

Senior career*
| Years | Team | Apps | (Gls) |
| 1998–1999 | Gramenet | 22 | (6) |
| 1999–2001 | Villarreal | 7 | (0) |
| 2000–2001 | → Elche (loan) | 16 | (0) |
| 2001–2002 | Onda | 37 | (7) |
| 2002–2004 | Gramenet | 75 | (12) |
| 2004–2007 | Recreativo | 65 | (7) |
| 2006–2007 | → Ciudad Murcia (loan) | 38 | (2) |
| 2007–2009 | Albacete | 52 | (4) |
| 2009–2011 | Lleida | 68 | (9) |
| 2011–2016 | Sant Andreu | 123 | (8) |
| Total | | 503 | (55) |
- * Club domestic league appearances and goals

Javier "Javi" Jiménez Santafé (born 21 January 1979) is a Spanish former professional footballer who played as an attacking midfielder.

== Club career ==
Jiménez was born in Santa Coloma de Gramenet, Province of Barcelona, Catalonia. He appeared in 178 Segunda División matches over seven seasons, totalling 13 goals for Villarreal CF, Elche CF, Recreativo de Huelva, Ciudad de Murcia and Albacete Balompié.
