= 2009 Copa del Rey final =

- Event: 2008–09 Copa del Rey
| Athletic Bilbao | Barcelona |
| 1 | 4 |
- Date: 13 May 2009
- Venue: Mestalla, Valencia
- Referee: Luis Medina Cantalejo
- Attendance: 50,000
- Weather: Partly cloudy 18 °C (64 °F)

The 2009 Copa del Rey final was the 107th final of the Spanish cup competition, the Copa del Rey (including two seasons where two rival editions were played). The final was played at Mestalla in Valencia on 13 May 2009. The match was won by FC Barcelona, who beat Athletic Bilbao 4–1. This was the first title of Barcelona that year, before winning La Liga and the UEFA Champions League to earn their first treble.

== Road to the final ==
| Barcelona | | | Round | Athletic Bilbao |
|---|---|---|---|---|---|---|
| Opponent | Result | Legs | | Opponent | Result | Legs |
| Benidorm | 2–0 | 0–1 away; 1–0 home | Round of 32 | Recreativo | 3–2 | 2–0 home; 2–1 away |
| Atlético Madrid | 5–2 | 1–3 away; 2–1 home | Round of 16 | Osasuna | 3–1 | 1–1 away; 2–0 home |
| Espanyol | 3–2 | 0–0 away; 3–2 home | Quarterfinals | Sporting Gijón | 2–1 | 0–0 home; 1–2 away |
| Mallorca | 3–1 | 2–0 home; 1–1 away | Semifinals | Sevilla | 4–2 | 2–1 away; 3–0 home |

== Match details ==
13 May 2009
22:00 CEST

| Athletic Bilbao | 1–4 | Barcelona |
|---|---|---|
| Toquero 8' | Report | Touré 32'; Messi 55'; Bojan 57'; Xavi 64' |

Estadio Mestalla, Valencia
Attendance: 50,000
Referee: Luis Medina Cantalejo

| Athletic Bilbao | Barcelona |

| GK | 1 | (Spain) Gorka Iraizoz |
| RB | 15 | (Spain) Andoni Iraola |
| CB | 20 | (Spain) Aitor Ocio |
| CB | 5 | (Spain) Fernando Amorebieta |
| LB | 3 | (Spain) Koikili Lertxundi | (yellow card) 35' |
| CM | 16 | (Spain) Pablo Orbaiz | | (substituted off) 61' |
| CM | 24 | (Spain) Javi Martínez |
| RW | 10 | (Spain) Francisco Yeste (c) |
| LW | 7 | (Spain) David López | (yellow card) 29' | (substituted off) 56' |
| CF | 9 | (Spain) Fernando Llorente |
| CF | 2 | (Spain) Gaizka Toquero | | (substituted off) 61' |
Substitutes:
| GK | 13 | (Spain) Armando |
| CB | 18 | (Spain) Carlos Gurpegui |
| CB | 29 | (Spain) Xabier Etxeita |
| LB | 42 | (Spain) Mikel Balenziaga |
| MF | 14 | (Spain) Markel Susaeta | | (substituted on) 56' |
| MF | 17 | (Spain) Joseba Etxeberria | | (substituted on) 61' |
| FW | 18 | (Spain) Ion Vélez | | (substituted on) 61' |
Manager:
(Spain) Joaquín Caparrós

| GK | 13 | (Spain) José Manuel Pinto |
| RB | 20 | (Brazil) Dani Alves |
| CB | 24 | (Ivory Coast) Yaya Touré | (yellow card) 21' | (substituted off) 89' |
| CB | 3 | (Spain) Gerard Piqué |
| LB | 5 | (Spain) Carles Puyol (c) |
| DM | 28 | (Spain) Sergio Busquets |
| CM | 6 | (Spain) Xavi | | (substituted off) 88' |
| CM | 15 | (Mali) Seydou Keita | (yellow card) 49' |
| RW | 10 | (Argentina) Lionel Messi | (yellow card) 50' |
| LW | 11 | (Spain) Bojan | | (substituted off) 84' |
| CF | 9 | (Cameroon) Samuel Eto'o |
Substitutes:
| GK | 1 | (Spain) Víctor Valdés |
| CB | 2 | (Uruguay) Martín Cáceres |
| DF | 16 | (Brazil) Sylvinho | | (substituted on) 89' |
| MF | 7 | (Iceland) Eiður Guðjohnsen |
| MF | 29 | (Spain) Víctor Sánchez |
| FW | 21 | (Belarus) Alexander Hleb | | (substituted on) 84' |
| FW | 27 | (Spain) Pedro | | (substituted on) 88' |
Manager:
(Spain) Pep Guardiola

== Anthem controversy ==
The pre-match playing of Spain's national anthem prompted widespread booing from Catalan nationalist fans of FC Barcelona and Basque nationalist fans of Athletic Bilbao. Televisión Española (TVE) cut away from its coverage as soon as this started and consequently did not show the playing of the anthem live, instead showing it at half time with the booing edited out. Afterwards, its director Javier Pons apologised for the "mistake", and Julian Reyes, the head of sports news, was fired as a result of the censorship.

== See also ==
- Athletic–Barcelona clásico
