= Matías Pavoni =

Argentine footballer

Personal information
- Full name: Matías Nicolas Pavoni Escabuso
- Date of birth: 25 September 1980 (age 46)
- Place of birth: Buenos Aires, Argentina
- Height: 1.76 m (5 ft 9 in)
- Position: Midfielder

Senior career*
Years	Team	Apps	(Gls)
1999–2001	Newell's Old Boys	14	(0)
2001–2002	Central Córdoba	29	(13)
2002–2007	Cádiz	157	(28)
2008	Asteras Tripolis	8	(0)
Total		208	(41)
- * Club domestic league appearances and goals

Matías Nicolas Pavoni Escabuso (born 25 September 1980) is an Argentine retired footballer who played as an attacking midfielder.

After starting his career with Newell's Old Boys he played mostly with Cádiz, representing the club in La Liga, Segunda División and Segunda División B and appearing in a total of 168 competitive matches (29 goals).

== Football career ==
Born in Buenos Aires, Pavoni began his senior career playing for Newell's Old Boys in the Primera División. In 2001, he was sold to neighbouring Central Córdoba de Rosario of the Primera B Nacional.

Pavoni moved to Europe for the 2002–03 season, joining Cádiz CF in Spain and scoring a career-best nine goals in his first year as the team promoted from Segunda División B. He was again instrumental two years later, netting eight times in 39 matches for the Andalusians who returned to La Liga after an absence of 12 years.

Pavoni made his debut in Spain's top flight on 28 August 2005, scoring in a 1–2 home loss against Real Madrid. Cádiz were eventually relegated at the end of the campaign as second from bottom, and the player appeared sparingly during the following years due to injury, also reportedly being due in wages.

Pavoni retired in December 2010 at the age of only 30, after an unassuming spell with Greece's Asteras Tripolis and more than two years without a club.

== Honours ==
Cádiz

- Segunda División: 2004–05
