= Bleriot Heuyot =

Cameroonian footballer

Personal information
- Full name: Bleriot Heuyot Tobit
- Date of birth: 27 November 1975 (age 50)
- Place of birth: Yaoundé, Cameroon
- Height: 1.80 m (5 ft 11 in)
- Position: Striker

Senior career*
Years	Team	Apps	(Gls)
1991–1994	Union Douala	121	(33)
1995–1996	Unisport de Bafang	39	(6)
1996–1997	Pogoń Szczecin		
1997–1998	Widzew Łódź	13	(0)
1999	Lech Poznań	1	(0)
2000	Córdoba	4	(0)
2001	Ciudad de Murcia		

International career
1993	Cameroon U20	2	(0)
- * Club domestic league appearances and goals

Bleriot Heuyot Tobit (born 27 November 1975 in Yaoundé) is a Cameroonian former professional footballer. He represented teams such as Pogoń Szczecin, Widzew Łódź, Lech Poznań, Córdoba CF and the Cameroon U20 at the 1993 FIFA World Youth Championship where he played 2 matches.
