= Ramón de Quintana =

Spanish footballer

Personal information
- Full name: Ramón de Quintana Dalmau
- Date of birth: 6 February 1972 (age 54)
- Place of birth: Girona, Spain
- Height: 1.88 m (6 ft 2 in)
- Position: Centre-back

Youth career
- Damm

Senior career*
Years	Team	Apps	(Gls)
1991–1993	Figueres	37	(0)
1993–1994	Osasuna	4	(0)
1994–1997	Rayo Vallecano	97	(1)
1997–2000	Mérida	84	(1)
2000–2003	Rayo Vallecano	88	(5)
2003–2008	Cádiz	148	(7)
Total		458	(14)

International career
1991	Spain U19	1	(0)
1991	Spain U20	4	(0)
1992–1993	Spain U21	3	(0)

Managerial career
- 2013–2014: Recreativo (assistant)
- 2015: Almería (assistant)
- * Club domestic league appearances and goals

Ramón de Quintana Dalmau (born 6 February 1972) is a Spanish former professional footballer who played as a central defender.

== Club career ==
Born in Girona, Catalonia, de Quintana started his senior career with UE Figueres in his native region, playing two seasons in the Segunda División; in his second year, he suffered the first of a national record eight relegations. In the 1993–94 campaign he made his La Liga debut with CA Osasuna, but appeared rarely as the Navarrese also dropped down a division.

Subsequently, de Quintana moved to Madrid's Rayo Vallecano in the second tier, earning promotion in his first season but being relegated in his third. With his following club, CP Mérida, he would suffer two relegations in three years, although the last one was due to financial irregularities as the Extremadura team had finished in sixth position in division two.

De Quintana returned to Rayo in summer 2000, helping the side to reach the quarter-finals of the UEFA Cup in his debut season – after they had been granted a spot in the European competition via the Fair Play ranking– but was again relegated in 2002–03, after which he left.

De Quintana's last club was Cádiz CF, where he spent five years, winning the second division in 2005 but being immediately relegated. After only appearing in nine league games in the 2007–08 campaign, with the Andalusians dropping to Segunda División B, he retired from football at the age of 36, totalling 458 matches and 14 goals in 17 professional seasons (204 appearances and six goals in the top flight alone).

== International career ==
De Quintana represented Spain at the 1991 FIFA World Youth Championship in Portugal, playing all the matches and minutes in a quarter-final exit.

== Honours ==
Cádiz

- Segunda División: 2004–05
