= Manolo Pérez =

Spanish footballer

Personal information
- Full name: Manuel Pérez Rodrigo
- Date of birth: 31 August 1976 (age 50)
- Place of birth: Barcelona, Spain
- Height: 1.81 m (5 ft 11 1/2 in)
- Position: Midfielder

Senior career*
Years	Team	Apps	(Gls)
1995–1996	Barcelona C		
1996–1997	Mallorca B	25	(1)
1997–1998	Gavà	34	(8)
1998–1999	Espanyol B	26	(1)
1999	Espanyol	1	(0)
1999–2000	Logroñés	38	(6)
2000–2001	Albacete	20	(1)
2001–2002	Ourense	21	(10)
2002–2003	Alicante	36	(9)
2003–2005	Cádiz	82	(12)
2006	Hércules	10	(0)
2006–2007	Elche	13	(0)
2007	Cultural Leonesa	11	(3)
2008	Lleida	18	(3)
2008–2009	Racing Ferrol	32	(4)
2009–2010	Melilla	31	(3)
2010	Poli Ejido	15	(1)
2011	Ceuta	13	(1)
2011–2012	Roquetas	10	(1)
Total		436	(64)
- * Club domestic league appearances and goals

Manuel 'Manolo' Pérez Rodrigo (born 31 August 1976) is a Spanish retired footballer who played as a central midfielder.

Over the course of six seasons (his professional career lasted 17 years) he amassed Segunda División totals of 159 games and 18 goals, representing in that tier Logroñés, Albacete, Cádiz, Hércules and Elche.

== Football career ==
Pérez was born in Barcelona, Catalonia. During his extensive career he played for 17 different clubs, starting out at RCD Mallorca B. He signed with RCD Espanyol in 1998, spending the vast majority of the season with the reserves in the third division; on 14 March 1999, he made his first-team – and La Liga – debut in a game against FC Barcelona, in what would the first of only three competitive appearances during his tenure.

Subsequently, Pérez resumed his career in the second and third levels, with a brief top flight spell with Cádiz CF. After two solid years in division two with the side, with 39 matches and seven goals en route to promotion in the latter season, he appeared scarcely for the Andalusians in the top flight, scoring his only goal in the competition in a derby against Real Betis on 27 November 2005 (1–1 away draw), with his team being finally relegated.

From 2007 onwards, Pérez played exclusively in division three, never settling with a club. In early 2012, after having started the campaign with CD Roquetas, who eventually suffered relegation, the 35-year-old retired from professional football, continuing to play in the regional leagues.
