= Oli (footballer) =

Spanish footballer and manager

Personal information
- Full name: Oliverio Jesús Álvarez González
- Date of birth: 2 April 1972 (age 54)
- Place of birth: Oviedo, Spain
- Height: 1.71 m (5 ft 7 in)
- Position: Striker

Youth career
- Oviedo

Senior career*
Years	Team	Apps	(Gls)
1990–1994	Oviedo B	64	(28)
1993–1997	Oviedo	111	(40)
1997–2000	Betis	92	(20)
2000–2003	Oviedo	105	(28)
2003–2006	Cádiz	106	(22)
Total		478	(138)

International career
1997	Spain	2	(1)
2000–2002	Asturias	3	(2)

Managerial career
- 2006: Cádiz
- 2007–2008: Marbella
- 2009: Écija
- 2009–2011: Betis B
- 2017–2021: Marino
- * Club domestic league appearances and goals

Oliverio Jesús Álvarez González (born 2 April 1972), commonly known as Oli, is a Spanish former professional footballer who played as a striker, currently a manager.

He amassed totals of 414 matches and 110 goals in 14 seasons across La Liga and Segunda División, nine of those spent in the former tier mainly with Real Oviedo. He appeared twice for the Spain national team in the 1990s.

In 2006, Oli started working as a manager.

== Club career ==
Oli was born in Oviedo, Asturias. He started his career with hometown club Real Oviedo, making his La Liga debut on 10 January 1993 in a 0–0 home draw against Albacete Balompié and being mainly associated with the reserves in his beginnings.

From 1994 to 1997, with Oviedo still in the top flight, Oli scored 40 league goals in 106 matches, 20 of which in his final season to help his team narrowly avoid relegation. Subsequently, he signed a six-year contract with fellow top-tier side Real Betis, pairing up front with Alfonso and netting nine times in his first year in Andalusia.

In the 1999–2000 campaign, Oli could only score once for the Verdiblancos, who dropped down a level after finishing 18th. He returned to Oviedo in the off-season, going on to find the net regularly but also suffer two relegations in only three years.

Oli joined Cádiz CF from Segunda División in 2003, contributing ten goals from 40 appearances in his second year for a promotion and his first and only piece of silverware. At the end of 2005–06, with the team having been sent to where they had come from, he retired from football at the age of 34.

== International career ==
Oli earned two caps for Spain during the 1998 FIFA World Cup qualifiers, against Slovakia and Faroe Islands. He scored in the latter fixture, a 3–1 win in Gijón.

=== International goals ===
#	Date	Venue	Opponent	Score	Result	Competition
1.	11 October 1997	El Molinón, Gijón, Spain	Faroe Islands	2–0	3–1	1998 World Cup qualification

== Coaching career ==
Moving into coaching in 2006, Oli started precisely with Cádiz, but was dismissed after only a few months in charge as the team eventually failed to regain their top-flight status winning just four from 11 games with him. In September 2007, he was hired at Segunda División B side UD Marbella.

In the following two seasons, Oli continued in Andalusia and the third tier, successively with Écija Balompié and Betis B. On 23 May 2017, after several years of inactivity, he was appointed at Tercera División club Marino de Luanco on a one-year contract. In the summer of 2019, after achieving promotion to Segunda División B without conceding one single goal in the play-offs, he agreed to a new deal; in January 2021, however, he resigned as he felt he was not able to perform his job properly anymore.

== Managerial statistics ==
As of 9 January 2021

Managerial record by team and tenure
Team	Nat	From	To	Record					Ref.
Team	Nat	From	To	G	W	D	L	Win %	Ref.
Cádiz	(Spain)	1 July 2006	5 November 2006	13	5	2	6	38.46	
Marbella	(Spain)	20 September 2007	26 May 2008	40	14	11	15	35.00	
Écija	(Spain)	9 February 2009	30 June 2009	14	4	5	5	28.57	
Betis B	(Spain)	30 June 2009	22 March 2011	68	20	23	25	29.41	
Marino	(Spain)	23 May 2017	11 January 2021	122	62	32	28	50.82	
Total				257	105	73	79	40.86	—

== Honours ==
=== Player ===
Cádiz

- Segunda División: 2004–05
