= 2003 Segunda División B play-offs =

Spanish football league play-offs

The 2003 Segunda División B play-offs (Playoffs de Ascenso or Promoción de Ascenso) were the final playoffs for promotion from 2002–03 Segunda División B to the 2003–04 Segunda División. The four first placed teams in each of the four Segunda División B groups played the Playoffs de Ascenso and the four last placed teams in Segunda División were relegated to Segunda División B.

The teams play a league of four teams, divided into 4 groups. The champion of each group is promoted to Segunda División.

== Group A ==
=== League table ===
Pos	Team	Pld	W	D	L	GF	GA	GD	Pts	Promotion or relegation
1	Cádiz CF (P)	6	3	2	1	8	6	+2	11	Promotion to Segunda División
2	FC Barcelona B	6	3	1	2	13	10	+3	10	
3	Universidad de Las Palmas	6	1	3	2	5	6	−1	6	
4	CD Logroñés	6	2	0	4	8	12	−4	6	

Source: arquero-arba
Rules for classification: 1st points; 2nd head-to-head points; 3rd head-to-head goal difference; 4th head-to-head goals scored; 5th goal difference; 6th number of goals scored
(P) Promoted

=== Results ===
Home \ Away	CAD	BAR	ULP	LOG
Cádiz CF		2–0	0–0	2–1
FC Barcelona B	3–1		1–1	3–1
Universidad de Las Palmas	1–1	1–3		2–0
CD Logroñés	1–2	4–3	1–0	

Source: arquero-arba
Legend: Blue = home team win; Yellow = draw; Red = away team win.

== Group B ==
=== League table ===
Pos	Team	Pld	W	D	L	GF	GA	GD	Pts	Promotion or relegation
1	Algeciras (P)	6	3	2	1	4	2	+2	11	Promotion to Segunda División
2	Athletic Club B	6	3	1	2	8	8	0	10	
3	Burgos CF	6	2	1	3	5	6	−1	7	
4	Zamora	6	2	0	4	8	9	−1	6	

Source: arquero-arba
Rules for classification: 1st points; 2nd head-to-head points; 3rd head-to-head goal difference; 4th head-to-head goals scored; 5th goal difference; 6th number of goals scored
(P) Promoted

=== Results ===
Home \ Away	ALG	ATH	BUR	ZAM
Algeciras		0–0	1–0	1–0
Athletic Club B	2–1		1–2	2–1
Burgos CF	0–0	0–1		2–1
Zamora	0–1	4–2	2–1	

Source: arquero-arba
Legend: Blue = home team win; Yellow = draw; Red = away team win.

== Group C ==
=== League table ===
Pos	Team	Pld	W	D	L	GF	GA	GD	Pts	Promotion or relegation
1	Málaga B (P)	6	4	0	2	9	5	+4	12	Promotion to Segunda División
2	UDA Gramenet	6	3	2	1	8	3	+5	11	
3	Real Unión	6	3	1	2	9	5	+4	10	
4	UD Lanzarote	6	0	1	5	2	15	−13	1	

Source: arquero-arba
Rules for classification: 1st points; 2nd head-to-head points; 3rd head-to-head goal difference; 4th head-to-head goals scored; 5th goal difference; 6th number of goals scored
(P) Promoted

=== Results ===
Home \ Away	MAL	GRA	RUN	LAN
Málaga B		1–0	1–0	3–0
UDA Gramenet	2–0		2–0	0–0
Real Unión	3–0	1–1		3–0
UD Lanzarote	0–4	1–3	1–2	

Source: arquero-arba
Legend: Blue = home team win; Yellow = draw; Red = away team win.

== Group D ==
=== League table ===
Pos	Team	Pld	W	D	L	GF	GA	GD	Pts	Promotion or relegation
1	Ciudad de Murcia (P)	6	4	2	0	9	4	+5	14	Promotion to Segunda División
2	CD Castellón	6	3	2	1	10	7	+3	11	
3	Barakaldo CF	6	1	1	4	13	17	−4	4	
4	Pontevedra	6	1	1	4	12	16	−4	4	

Source: arquero-arba
Rules for classification: 1st points; 2nd head-to-head points; 3rd head-to-head goal difference; 4th head-to-head goals scored; 5th goal difference; 6th number of goals scored
(P) Promoted

=== Results ===
Home \ Away	CMU	CAS	BAR	PON
Ciudad de Murcia		3–1	1–0	1–0
CD Castellón	0–0		2–1	2–0
Barakaldo CF	2–2	1–3		3–4
Pontevedra	1–2	2–2	5–6	

Source: arquero-arba
Legend: Blue = home team win; Yellow = draw; Red = away team win.
