= Antonio Calderón (footballer, born 1984) =

Spanish footballer

Personal information
- Full name: Antonio Calderón Vallejo
- Date of birth: 31 March 1984 (age 42)
- Place of birth: Ronda, Spain
- Height: 1.68 m (5 ft 6 in)
- Position: Winger

Youth career
- 1999–2000: Ronda
- 2000–2003: Málaga

Senior career*
Years	Team	Apps	(Gls)
2002–2006	Málaga B	90	(9)
2006–2010	Jaén	86	(4)
2010–2011	Ronda	21	(8)
2011	Extremadura	11	(0)
2011–2012	Jerez	2	(0)
2012–2013	Arandina	15	(2)
2013	Unión Estepona	10	(2)
2013–2014	Vélez	9	(1)
2014	Legionovia Legionowo	16	(3)
2014–2015	Arka Gdynia	12	(2)
2014	Arka Gdynia II	5	(0)
2015	Pogoń Siedlce	16	(4)
2015	Pogoń Siedlce II	1	(0)
2015	Lincoln Red Imps	0	(0)
2015–2016	Dolcan Ząbki	13	(2)
2016–2018	Lincoln Red Imps	57	(5)
2018–2019	St Joseph's	21	(1)
2019–2022	Ronda		
- * Club domestic league appearances and goals

Antonio Calderón Vallejo (born 31 March 1984) is a Spanish former professional footballer. Mainly a left winger, he also played as a left back.

== Club career ==
Born in Ronda, Málaga, Andalusia, Calderón joined Málaga CF's youth setup in 2000, aged 16, after starting out at hometown club CD Ronda. He made his debuts as a senior with the reserves in the 2002–03 campaign, winning promotion from Segunda División B.

On 30 August 2003 Calderón played his first match as a professional, starting in a 2–3 away loss against UD Almería in the Segunda División championship. He scored his first goal on 9 November, netting the first of a 5–2 home win against Xerez CD.

In the 2006 summer, after both main and reserve squad suffered relegations, Calderón moved to Real Jaén in the third level. After three full seasons appearing regularly (only missing almost the whole 2007–08 campaign due to injury), he returned to Ronda, in Tercera División.

On 25 January 2011 Calderón joined third-tier club Extremadura UD. After suffering relegation, he subsequently continued his career in the fourth level, representing Jerez CF, Arandina CF, Unión Estepona CF and Vélez CF.

On 15 January 2014 Calderón went on a trial at Polish I Liga side Legionovia Legionowo, signing a contract shortly after. On 1 July, after appearing regularly, he signed a one-year deal with Ekstraklasa's Arka Gdynia. In January 2016, he joined Lincoln Red Imps, winning two titles during his time at the club. However, in August 2018, he signed for St Joseph's.
