= 2007–08 Cádiz CF season =

Cádiz
2007–08 season
- President: Arturo Baldasano
- Head coach: Mariano García Remón (until October); Antonio Calderón (October to April); Raúl Procopio (April to May); Julián Rubio (1 to 15 June)
- Stadium: Estadio Ramón de Carranza
- Segunda División: 20th (relegated)
- Copa del Rey: Third round
- Top goalscorer: League: Dani (10); All: Dani (10)

The 2007–08 season was the 98th season in the history of Cádiz CF and the club's second consecutive in the second division of Spanish football. In addition to the domestic league, Cádiz participated in this season's edition of the Copa del Rey.

== Competitions ==
=== Overall record ===
Competition	First match	Last match	Starting round	Final position	Record							
Competition	First match	Last match	Starting round	Final position	Pld	W	D	L	GF	GA	GD	Win %
Segunda División	25 August 2007	15 June 2008	Matchday 1	20th	42	12	13	17	40	47	−7	28.57
Copa del Rey	5 September 2007	10 October 2007	Second round	Third round	2	1	0	1	5	5	+0	50.00
Total					44	13	13	18	45	52	−7	29.55

Source: Competitions

=== Segunda División ===
==== League table ====
Pos	Team	Pld	W	D	L	GF	GA	GD	Pts	Promotion or relegation
18	Córdoba	42	11	17	14	50	56	−6	50 (Note: RFE 0–1 CÓR; CÓR 1–0 RFE)	
19	Racing Ferrol (R)	42	12	14	16	46	51	−5	50	Relegation to Segunda División B
20	Cádiz (R)	42	12	13	17	40	47	−7	49	Relegation to Segunda División B
21	Granada 74 (R)	42	10	15	17	45	59	−14	45	Relegation to Segunda División B
22	Poli Ejido (R)	42	11	11	20	37	54	−17	44	Relegation to Segunda División B

Source: LFP - Liga Adelante
Rules for classification: 1st points; 2nd head-to-head points; 3rd head-to-head goal difference; 4th head-to-head goals scored; 5th goal difference; 6th number of goals scored; 7th Fair-play points
(R) Relegated

==== Results summary ====
Overall								Home						Away					
Pld	W	D	L	GF	GA	GD	Pts	W	D	L	GF	GA	GD	W	D	L	GF	GA	GD
42	12	13	17	40	47	−7	49	8	7	6	23	17	+6	4	6	11	17	30	−13

Source: Segunda División

==== Results by round ====
Round	1	2	3	4	5	6	7	8	9	10	11	12	13	14	15	16	17	18	19	20	21	22	23	24	25	26	27	28	29	30	31	32	33	34	35	36	37	38	39	40	41	42
Ground	H	A	H	A	H	A	H	A	H	A	H	A	H	A	H	A	H	A	H	A	H	A	H	A	H	A	H	A	H	A	H	A	H	A	H	A	H	A	H	A	H	A
Result	W	L	W	D	L	L	L	L	D	L	W	W	D	L	W	D	W	W	L	W	L	L	D	D	W	D	D	L	W	L	D	L	W	W	L	L	D	L	L	D	D	D
Position	6	11	8	8	13	15	15	17	18	19	18	16	17	18	16	16	13	10	13	11	14	14	14	14	12	13	13	15	11	13	13	14	12	11	14	14	13	16	17	17	18	20

Source: Segunda División
A = Away; H = Home; W = Win; D = Draw; L = Loss

==== Matches ====
25 August 2007 1	Cádiz	2–0	Granada 74	Cádiz
CEST (UTC+2)				Stadium: Ramón de Carranza

2 September 2007 2	Tenerife	2–0	Cádiz	Santa Cruz de Tenerife
CEST (UTC+2)

9 September 2007 3	Cádiz	1–0	Salamanca	Cádiz
CEST (UTC+2)				Stadium: Ramón de Carranza

15 September 2007 4	Alavés	1–1	Cádiz	Vitoria-Gasteiz
CEST (UTC+2)

22 September 2007 5	Cádiz	0–1	Córdoba	Cádiz
CEST (UTC+2)				Stadium: Ramón de Carranza

29 September 2007 6	Castellón	2–0	Cádiz	Castellón de la Plana
CEST (UTC+2)

7 October 2007 7	Cádiz	1–2	Eibar	Cádiz
CEST (UTC+2)				Stadium: Ramón de Carranza

13 October 2007 8	Poli Ejido	1–0	Cádiz	El Ejido
CEST (UTC+2)

20 October 2007 9	Cádiz	0–0	Las Palmas	Cádiz
CEST (UTC+2)				Stadium: Ramón de Carranza

27 October 2007 10	Elche	1–0	Cádiz	Elche
CEST (UTC+2)				Stadium: Estadio Manuel Martínez Valero

3 November 2007 11	Cádiz	2–1	Xerez	Cádiz
CEST (UTC+2)				Stadium: Ramón de Carranza

11 November 2007 12	Albacete	0–1	Cádiz	Albacete
CEST (UTC+2)

18 November 2007 13	Cádiz	0–0	Numancia	Cádiz
CEST (UTC+2)				Stadium: Ramón de Carranza

25 November 2007 14	Sporting Gijón	4–2	Cádiz	Gijón
CEST (UTC+2)				Stadium: El Molinón

2 December 2007 15	Cádiz	3–1	Racing Ferrol	Cádiz
CEST (UTC+2)				Stadium: Ramón de Carranza

9 December 2007 16	Real Sociedad	0–0	Cádiz	San Sebastián
CEST (UTC+2)				Stadium: Anoeta

16 December 2007 17	Cádiz	3–1	Celta Vigo	Cádiz
CEST (UTC+2)				Stadium: Ramón de Carranza

22 December 2007 18	Gimnàstic de Tarragona	0–1	Cádiz	Tarragona
CEST (UTC+2)

5 January 2008 19	Cádiz	0–1	Málaga	Cádiz
CEST (UTC+2)				Stadium: Ramón de Carranza

13 January 2008 20	Sevilla Atlético	1–2	Cádiz	Seville
CEST (UTC+2)

20 January 2008 21	Cádiz	1–2	Hércules	Cádiz
CEST (UTC+2)				Stadium: Ramón de Carranza

27 January 2008 22	Granada 74	2–1	Cádiz	Granada
CEST (UTC+2)

2 February 2008 23	Cádiz	0–0	Tenerife	Cádiz
CEST (UTC+2)				Stadium: Ramón de Carranza

10 February 2008 24	Salamanca	1–1	Cádiz	Salamanca
CEST (UTC+2)

17 February 2008 25	Cádiz	2–0	Alavés	Cádiz
CEST (UTC+2)				Stadium: Ramón de Carranza

23 February 2008 26	Córdoba	2–2	Cádiz	Córdoba
CEST (UTC+2)

2 March 2008 27	Cádiz	1–1	Castellón	Cádiz
CEST (UTC+2)				Stadium: Ramón de Carranza

8 March 2008 28	Eibar	1–0	Cádiz	Eibar
CEST (UTC+2)

15 March 2008 29	Cádiz	2–0	Poli Ejido	Cádiz
CEST (UTC+2)				Stadium: Ramón de Carranza

22 March 2008 30	Las Palmas	2–0	Cádiz	Las Palmas
CEST (UTC+2)

30 March 2008 31	Cádiz	1–1	Elche	Cádiz
CEST (UTC+2)				Stadium: Ramón de Carranza

5 April 2008 32	Xerez	2–1	Cádiz	Jerez de la Frontera
CEST (UTC+2)

13 April 2008 33	Cádiz	2–1	Albacete	Cádiz
CEST (UTC+2)				Stadium: Ramón de Carranza

20 April 2008 34	Numancia	0–1	Cádiz	Soria
CEST (UTC+2)				Stadium: Los Pajaritos

27 April 2008 35	Cádiz	0–1	Sporting Gijón	Cádiz
CEST (UTC+2)				Stadium: Ramón de Carranza

4 May 2008 36	Racing Ferrol	2–1	Cádiz	Ferrol
CEST (UTC+2)				Stadium: A Malata

11 May 2008 37	Cádiz	2–2	Real Sociedad	Cádiz
CEST (UTC+2)				Stadium: Ramón de Carranza

18 May 2008 38	Celta Vigo	5–2	Cádiz	Vigo
CEST (UTC+2)				Stadium: Balaídos

25 May 2008 39	Cádiz	0–2	Gimnàstic de Tarragona	Cádiz
CEST (UTC+2)				Stadium: Ramón de Carranza

1 June 2008 40	Málaga	0–0	Cádiz	Málaga
CEST (UTC+2)				Stadium: La Rosaleda

8 June 2008 41	Cádiz	0–0	Sevilla Atlético	Cádiz
CEST (UTC+2)				Stadium: Ramón de Carranza

15 June 2008 42	Hércules	1–1	Cádiz	Alicante
CEST (UTC+2)				Stadium: José Rico Pérez

=== Copa del Rey ===
5 September 2007 Second round	Córdoba	2–3	Cádiz	Córdoba
CEST (UTC+2)				Stadium: Nuevo Arcángel

10 October 2007 Third round	Cádiz	2–3	Granada 74	Cádiz
CEST (UTC+2)				Stadium: Ramón de Carranza
