= Kenneth Chipolina =

Gibraltarian footballer

Personal information
- Full name: Kenneth George Chipolina
- Date of birth: 8 April 1994 (age 32)
- Place of birth: Gibraltar
- Position: Defender

Team information
- Current team: Mons Calpe
- Number: 3

Senior career*
Years	Team	Apps	(Gls)
2009–2010	St Joseph's		
2010–2011	Gibraltar United		
2012–2013	St Joseph's		
2013–2014	Lions Pilots		
2014–2015	Gibraltar United	10	(0)
2015–2019	Lincoln Red Imps	26	(2)
2015	→ Gibraltar United (loan)	5	(0)
2017–2018	→ Lions Gibraltar (loan)	13	(1)
2018–2019	→ Lynx (loan)	13	(0)
2020–2021	St Joseph's	10	(1)
2021	Europa	0	(0)
2022–2023	Manchester 62	5	(0)
2023–	Mons Calpe	12	(3)

International career^{‡}
2017–	Gibraltar	3	(0)
- * Club domestic league appearances and goals as of 9 December 2023 ‡ National team caps and goals as of 9 May 2022

Kenneth George Chipolina (born 8 April 1994) is a Gibraltarian football player who plays for Mons Cape and the Gibraltar national football team.

== Personal life ==
He is related to two fellow footballers, being the younger brother of Joseph Chipolina and the cousin of Roy Chipolina.
