= Raúl Navas (footballer, born 1978) =

Spanish footballer

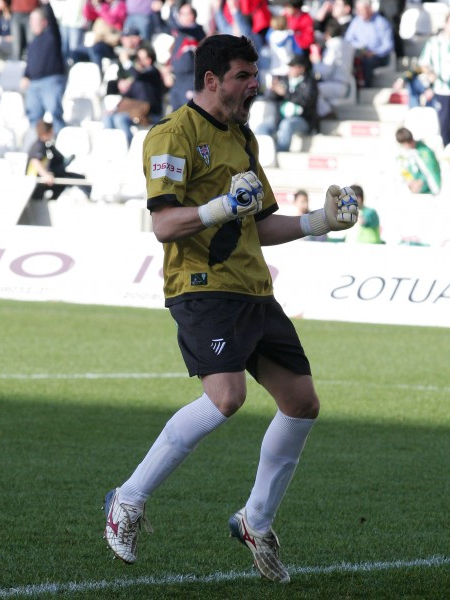
- Navas with Córdoba in 2010

Personal information
- Full name: Raúl Navas Paúl
- Date of birth: 3 May 1978 (age 48)
- Place of birth: Cádiz, Spain
- Height: 1.79 m (5 ft 10 1/2 in)
- Position: Goalkeeper

Youth career
- 1991–1992: Tiempo Libre
- 1992–1994: Cádiz
- 1994–1995: Balón Cádiz
- 1995–1997: Cádiz

Senior career*
Years	Team	Apps	(Gls)
1997–1999	Balón Cádiz		
1999–2001	Cádiz B		
2001–2006	Cádiz	34	(0)
2006–2008	Tenerife	17	(0)
2008–2011	Córdoba	92	(0)
2012–2013	Xerez	9	(0)
2015–2018	Lincoln Red Imps	27	(0)
Total		179+	(0)
- * Club domestic league appearances and goals

Raúl Navas Paúl (born 3 May 1978 in Cádiz, Andalusia) is a Spanish former professional footballer who played as a goalkeeper.
