= Ciudad de Murcia =

Spanish football club

- Full name: Club de Fútbol Ciudad de Murcia, S.A.D.
- Founded: 1999
- Dissolved: 2007 (relocated)
- Ground: La Condomina
- Capacity: 16,000
Home colours	Away colours

Club de Fútbol Ciudad de Murcia, usually abbreviated to Ciudad de Murcia, was a Spanish football club based in Murcia, in the namesake autonomous community. They played at the 16,000-seater Estadio de La Condomina.

Ciudad Murcia was relocated to Granada and renamed Granada 74 CF after the end of the 2006–07 season.

== History ==
Ciudad de Murcia was formed in the heat of the summer of 1999, when Quique Pina, a former player of Real Murcia, started the club with the help of local businesses and influential friendships.

In the 2003–04 season, the new club first appeared in Segunda División. After reaching as high as a 12th place, it finished 17th, narrowly avoiding relegation, repeating the feat in the following campaign (18th).

Impressive performances, particularly towards the back end of the season, saw Ciudad attain a much higher league standing in 2005–06. Influential players such as José Juan Luque (20 goals) and Daniel Kome helped to keep the club in the promotion picture until the last day, eventually losing out to Levante UD for the third place; in the 2006–07 season, more of the same, but now 13 points behind the last promotee, neighbouring Real Murcia.

On 6 June 2007, Ciudad de Murcia was acquired by an investor from Granada, transferring it to that city and renaming it Granada 74 CF. The players still under contract with Ciudad had the option to cancel their contract or stay on with the newly formed club.

As the second division team moved to Granada, the reserve team, CF Atlético Ciudad, playing in the fourth level, became the club's first team in 2007–08.

== Season to season ==
Season	Tier	Division	Place	Copa del Rey
1999–2000	5	Reg. Pref.	1st	
2000–01	4	3ª	1st	
2001–02	3	2ªB	5th	Round of 16
2002–03	3	2ªB	3rd	
2003–04	2	2ª	17th	
2004–05	2	2ª	18th	
2005–06	2	2ª	4th	
2006–07	2	2ª	4th	
2007–2009	as Granada 74 CF			

- 4 seasons in Segunda División
- 2 seasons in Segunda División B
- 1 season in Tercera División

== Statistics 2006–07 ==
Segunda División	Position	Pts	P	W	D	L	F	A
Ciudad de Murcia	4	63	42	18	9	15	52	44

- Top Scorers:
  - Goitom – 15 goals
  - Luque – 11 goals
  - Saizar – 8 goals
- Top Goalkeepers:
  - Jaime Jiménez – 23 goals in 21 matches
  - José Juan – 20 goals in 20 matches

== Notable players ==
- (Argentina) Rolando Zárate
- (Argentina) Damián Timpani
- (Argentina) Cristian Díaz
- (Argentina) Luciano Becchio
- (Argentina) Turu Flores
- (Argentina) Javier Liendo
- (Brazil) Alexandre
- (Brazil) Thiago Schumacher
- (Cameroon) David Eto'o
- (Cameroon) Bleriot Heuyot
- (Cameroon) Daniel Kome
- (Chile) Juan Pablo Úbeda
- (France) Romain Ferrier
- (Paraguay) Carlos Torres
- (Portugal) João Manuel Pinto
- (Portugal) Marco Almeida
- (Serbia) Leo Lerinc
- (Serbia) Slaviša Jokanović
- (Spain) Héctor Font
- (Spain) Javier Camuñas
- (Spain) Roberto Cuevas
- (Spain) Ibán Espadas
- (Spain) Daniel Güiza
- (Spain) Mikel Lasa
- (Spain) Mikel Labaka
- (Spain) Dani Bautista
- (Spain) José Juan Luque
- (Spain) Raúl Medina
- (Spain) Ayoze
- (Spain) Xabi Jiménez
- (Spain) Rubén Torrecilla
- (Spain) (Peru) Roberto Merino
- (Sweden) (Eritrea) Henok Goitom
- (Togo) (France) Ludovic Assemoassa
- (Venezuela) Jonay Hernández
- (Venezuela) Miku

== Famous coaches ==
- (Spain) Juan Manuel Lillo
- (Spain) Abel Resino
- (Spain) José Luis Oltra
