= 2004–05 Segunda División =

74th season of the second-tier football league in Spain

Segunda División
- Season: 2004–05
- Champions: Cádiz
- Promoted: Cádiz; Celta Vigo; Alavés
- Relegated: Córdoba CF; Terrassa FC; UD Salamanca; Pontevedra CF
- Matches: 462
- Goals: 1,054 (2.28 per match)
- Top goalscorer: (Spain) Mario Bermejo

These are the team results from the Segunda División during the 2004–05 season.

== Teams ==
Location of teams in Segunda División 2004–05
Canary Islands

The 2004–05 Segunda División was made up of the following teams:

Team	Home city	Stadium	Capacity
Alavés	Vitoria-Gasteiz	Mendizorrotza	19,840
Almería	Almería	Juegos Mediterráneos	15,000
Cádiz	Cádiz	Ramón de Carranza	23,000
Celta de Vigo	Vigo	Balaídos	29,000
Ciudad de Murcia	Murcia	La Condomina	17,000
Córdoba	Córdoba	Nuevo Arcángel	21,822
Eibar	Eibar	Ipurua	5,000
Elche	Elche	Martínez Valero	36,017
Gimnàstic	Tarragona	Nou Estadi	14,591
Lleida	Leida	Camp d'Esports	13,500
Málaga B	Málaga	La Rosaleda	28,963
Polideportivo Ejido	El Ejido	Santo Domingo	7,870
Pontevedra	Pontevedra	Pasarón	12,000
Racing Ferrol	Ferrol	A Malata	12,024
Real Murcia	Murcia	La Condomina	16,800
Recreativo de Huelva	Huelva	Nuevo Colombino	21,670
Salamanca	Villares de la Reina	Helmántico	17,341
Sporting de Gijón	Gijón	El Molinón	25,885
Tenerife	Santa Cruz de Tenerife	Heliodoro Rodríguez López	22,824
Terrassa	Terrassa	Olímpic de Terrassa	11,500
Real Valladolid	Valladolid	José Zorrilla	27,846
Xerez	Jerez de la Frontera	Chapín	20,523

== League table ==
Pos	Team	Pld	W	D	L	GF	GA	GD	Pts	Promotion or relegation
1	Cádiz (C, P)	42	21	13	8	68	30	+38	76 (Note: CÁD: 9 pts; CEL: 4 pts → CEL 2-2 ALA; ALA: 4 pts → ALA 0-3 CEL)	Promotion to La Liga
2	Celta de Vigo (P)	42	22	10	10	55	38	+17	76	Promotion to La Liga
3	Alavés (P)	42	23	7	12	62	47	+15	76	Promotion to La Liga
4	Eibar	42	20	13	9	53	39	+14	73	
5	Recreativo	42	19	14	9	48	32	+16	71	
6	Valladolid	42	18	9	15	56	56	0	63	
7	Gimnàstic	42	16	12	14	49	45	+4	60	
8	Xerez	42	14	17	11	39	36	+3	59	
9	Tenerife	42	13	18	11	42	45	−3	57 (Note: TEN: 8 pts; ELC: 4 pts → ELC 4-0 SPG; SPG: 4 pts → SPG 3-1 ELC)	
10	Elche	42	16	9	17	51	52	−1	57	
11	Sporting Gijón	42	15	12	15	41	39	+2	57	
12	Murcia	42	15	9	18	40	52	−12	54	
13	Poli Ejido	42	12	16	14	41	45	−4	52	
14	Almería	42	13	12	17	36	44	−8	51	
15	Lleida	42	13	11	18	46	54	−8	50	
16	Racing Ferrol	42	12	13	17	55	54	+1	49	
17	Málaga B	42	12	12	18	33	51	−18	48	
18	Ciudad de Murcia	42	10	17	15	49	57	−8	47	
19	Córdoba (R)	42	12	10	20	43	52	−9	46	Relegation to Segunda División B
20	Terrassa (R)	42	12	8	22	45	63	−18	44 (Note: TER: 8 pts; SAL: 6 pts; PON: 4 pts)	Relegation to Segunda División B
21	Salamanca (R)	42	12	8	22	50	63	−13	44	Relegation to Segunda División B
22	Pontevedra (R)	42	10	14	18	52	60	−8	44	Relegation to Segunda División B

Source: LFP – Liga Adelante
Rules for classification: 1st points; 2nd head-to-head points; 3rd head-to-head goal difference; 4th head-to-head goals scored; 5th goal difference; 6th number of goals scored; 7th Fair-play points
(C) Champions; (P) Promoted; (R) Relegated

== Results ==
Home \ Away	ALA	ALM	CÁD	CEL	CIU	CÓR	EIB	ELC	GIM	LLE	MAB	MUR	POL	PON	RAF	REC	SAL	SPO	TEN	TER	VAD	XER
Alavés	—	2–1	1–3	0–3	1–1	1–1	0–2	1–0	1–1	2–0	3–1	2–3	2–0	3–2	2–1	0–2	2–1	0–1	1–0	4–1	2–4	2–0
Almería	0–1	—	0–1	0–1	0–0	2–0	2–1	2–2	1–1	1–1	0–1	1–0	1–1	1–0	1–6	1–0	0–1	1–0	0–1	2–2	0–0	1–2
Cádiz	0–1	2–1	—	2–0	0–0	4–1	1–2	3–1	2–1	0–2	4–0	0–1	3–0	4–0	2–0	0–0	0–0	0–0	4–1	3–1	6–1	0–1
Celta	2–2	1–0	0–2	—	0–1	0–1	1–2	2–2	1–0	0–0	0–0	1–0	1–0	2–0	1–1	1–1	2–0	1–0	1–1	2–1	2–0	2–1
Ciudad de Murcia	2–0	0–1	0–0	2–2	—	1–0	1–1	0–0	1–1	1–2	0–0	1–3	1–3	2–3	3–0	2–2	2–1	0–2	0–1	2–0	2–2	0–2
Córdoba	1–2	3–0	0–2	0–1	0–1	—	0–0	0–2	2–0	0–1	5–2	1–1	2–1	0–0	1–2	0–2	0–0	0–0	2–0	2–1	3–4	1–2
Eibar	1–2	1–0	2–1	2–1	3–2	1–0	—	5–2	0–2	1–1	0–0	1–0	0–0	1–2	1–1	1–2	2–1	1–0	0–0	1–0	2–0	0–0
Elche	1–2	0–0	1–1	0–1	3–1	1–2	1–0	—	3–3	2–1	2–1	1–0	3–1	2–0	2–1	0–1	0–2	4–0	0–0	1–0	3–2	1–2
Gimnàstic	1–0	1–2	1–1	0–2	0–0	1–1	3–2	2–0	—	2–1	0–2	2–0	1–4	0–0	1–1	4–4	2–0	1–0	1–0	3–1	0–1	1–0
Lleida	0–1	1–0	1–3	0–2	0–0	1–2	1–1	1–2	2–0	—	2–1	5–1	0–1	3–0	1–2	2–3	2–1	0–2	1–1	4–2	2–0	1–1
Málaga "B"	1–1	1–2	1–1	0–1	3–1	3–2	0–0	1–0	0–1	1–0	—	0–2	0–0	1–1	1–1	0–1	1–3	1–0	2–1	0–0	0–2	0–3
Murcia	1–5	0–0	0–2	1–1	2–2	1–0	1–0	1–0	1–0	1–0	0–1	—	3–3	2–2	1–0	1–3	0–0	1–3	1–0	0–1	0–1	1–1
Poli Ejido	0–1	2–0	0–0	0–3	2–2	2–0	4–1	1–0	1–0	2–0	1–2	1–1	—	1–0	0–0	1–0	1–1	1–1	2–2	0–0	0–3	0–0
Pontevedra	1–3	0–2	1–1	3–1	2–2	1–1	2–3	2–2	3–1	5–0	1–1	0–1	0–1	—	1–1	0–0	2–1	1–2	1–1	3–3	3–0	2–1
Racing Ferrol	2–1	0–1	1–1	1–2	4–0	0–0	0–1	0–1	1–4	1–3	1–0	3–1	2–0	1–2	—	0–1	2–1	0–0	2–2	3–0	2–3	1–2
Recreativo	0–0	1–1	1–1	1–2	3–2	3–1	0–0	2–1	1–0	3–0	0–1	1–0	1–1	2–1	0–1	—	0–0	1–1	0–0	2–1	2–0	1–0
Salamanca	3–3	3–2	1–3	0–1	0–2	0–3	1–2	2–0	0–1	0–1	1–2	3–1	1–1	2–0	0–2	1–0	—	2–1	4–5	3–1	1–2	1–1
Sporting	1–2	1–0	0–0	1–0	2–2	3–1	0–0	3–1	0–3	1–1	2–0	2–0	1–0	3–2	3–2	0–1	1–2	—	1–1	2–0	1–1	0–0
Tenerife	1–0	1–3	2–0	3–1	1–0	0–2	1–1	1–0	0–0	1–1	1–1	2–1	1–1	0–0	1–1	2–0	1–4	1–0	—	2–1	0–2	1–0
Terrassa	0–2	1–1	3–2	1–4	0–1	2–0	2–3	0–1	1–2	3–0	1–0	0–2	2–0	1–0	3–2	1–0	3–0	1–0	0–0	—	2–1	0–1
Valladolid	1–0	0–1	0–1	3–3	2–1	0–1	1–2	1–2	1–0	1–1	3–0	0–2	2–1	0–1	1–1	1–0	3–2	2–0	2–1	2–2	—	1–1
Xerez	0–1	1–1	0–2	3–0	3–5	1–1	0–3	1–1	1–1	0–0	1–0	0–1	1–0	1–0	2–2	0–0	1–0	1–0	1–1	0–0	0–0	—

Source: BDFutbol
Legend: Blue = home team win; Yellow = draw; Red = away team win.

== Final conclusion ==
=== Promoted to La Liga ===
- Cádiz CF
- Celta de Vigo
- Deportivo Alavés

=== Promoted from Segunda División B ===
- Segunda División Play-Off 2004-05:
- Hércules CF
- CD Castellón
- Lorca Deportiva
- Real Madrid Castilla

=== Relegated to Segunda División B ===
- Pontevedra—Relegated to Segunda División B – Group 1
- Salamanca—Relegated to Segunda División B – Group 2
- Terrassa—Relegated to Segunda División B – Group 3
- Córdoba CF—Relegated to Segunda División B – Group 4

=== Relegated from La Liga ===
- Levante UD
- CD Numancia
- Albacete Balompié

== Top scorers ==
- Mario Bermejo (Racing de Ferrol): 25 goals
- Dani Güiza (Ciudad de Murcia): 21 goals
- Nino (Elche): 20 goals
- Joseba Llorente (Eibar): 18 goals
- Gorka Brit (Salamanca): 17 goals

== Top goalkeepers ==
- Armando (Cádiz): 28 goals in 40 matches
- Juan José Valencia (Gimnàstic): 25 goals in 28 matches
- José Manuel Pinto (Celta): 34 goals in 38 matches
- Roberto (Sporting): 35 goals in 39 matches
- Gorka Iraizoz (Eibar): 38 goals in 41 matches

== Teams by Autonomous Community ==
	Autonomous community	Number of teams	Teams
1	Andalusia	7	Almería, Cádiz, Córdoba, Málaga B, Poli Ejido, Recreativo, Xerez
2	Catalonia	3	Gimnàstic, Lleida, Terrassa
2	Galicia	3	Celta, Pontevedra, Racing
4	Basque Country	2	Alavés, Eibar
4	Castile and León	2	Salamanca, Valladolid
4	Murcia	2	Ciudad de Murcia, Murcia
7	Asturias	1	Sporting
7	Canary Islands	1	Tenerife
7	Valencia	1	Elche
