= 2006–07 Real Valladolid season =

Real Valladolid
2006–07 season
- President: Carlos Suárez Sureda
- Head coach: José Luis Mendilibar
- Stadium: José Zorrilla
- Segunda División: 1st (promoted)
- Copa del Rey: Quarter-finals
- Top goalscorer: League: Víctor (19); All: Víctor (19)
Home colours	Away colours

The 2006–07 season was the 78th season in the existence of Real Valladolid and the club's third consecutive season in the second division of Spanish football. In addition to the domestic league, Real Valladolid participated in this season's edition of the Copa del Rey. The season covered the period from 1 July 2006 to 30 June 2007.

== Competitions ==
=== Overall record ===
Competition	First match	Last match	Starting round	Final position	Record							
Competition	First match	Last match	Starting round	Final position	Pld	W	D	L	GF	GA	GD	Win %
Segunda División	27 August 2006	16 June 2007	Matchday 1	Winners	42	26	10	6	70	35	+35	61.90
Copa del Rey	20 September 2006	28 February 2007	Second round	Quarter-finals	8	6	1	1	11	7	+4	75.00
Total					50	32	11	7	81	42	+39	64.00

Source: Competitions

=== Segunda División ===
==== League table ====
Pos	Team	Pld	W	D	L	GF	GA	GD	Pts	Promotion or relegation
1	Valladolid (C, P)	42	26	10	6	70	35	+35	88	Promotion to La Liga
2	Almería (P)	42	24	8	10	73	49	+24	80	Promotion to La Liga
3	Murcia (P)	42	21	13	8	62	45	+17	76	Promotion to La Liga
4	Ciudad de Murcia	42	18	9	15	52	44	+8	63	
5	Cádiz	42	15	16	11	53	45	+8	61	

Source: LFP - Liga Adelante
Rules for classification: 1st points; 2nd head-to-head points; 3rd head-to-head goal difference; 4th head-to-head goals scored; 5th goal difference; 6th number of goals scored; 7th Fair-play points
(C) Champions; (P) Promoted

==== Results summary ====
Overall								Home						Away					
Pld	W	D	L	GF	GA	GD	Pts	W	D	L	GF	GA	GD	W	D	L	GF	GA	GD
42	26	10	6	70	35	+35	88	14	4	3	32	13	+19	12	6	3	38	22	+16

Source: Segunda División

==== Results by round ====
Round	1	2	3	4	5	6	7	8	9	10	11	12	13	14	15	16	17	18	19	20	21	22	23	24	25	26	27	28	29	30	31	32	33	34	35	36	37	38	39	40	41	42
Ground	A	H	A	H	A	H	H	A	H	A	H	A	H	A	H	A	H	A	H	A	H	H	A	H	A	H	A	A	H	A	H	A	H	A	H	A	H	A	H	A	H	A
Result	W	W	L	L	D	L	W	D	W	W	W	W	W	W	D	D	W	D	W	W	W	W	D	W	W	D	D	W	W	W	W	W	W	W	D	L	D	L	L	W	W	W
Position																																										

Source: Segunda División
A = Away; H = Home; W = Win; D = Draw; L = Loss

==== Matches ====
27 August 2006 1	Sporting Gijón	1–3	Valladolid	Gijón
CEST (UTC+2)				Stadium: El Molinón

3 September 2006 2	Valladolid	2–0	Las Palmas	Valladolid
CEST (UTC+2)				Stadium: José Zorrilla

9 September 2006 3	Ciudad de Murcia	1–0	Valladolid	Murcia
CEST (UTC+2)				Stadium: Estadio de La Condomina

17 September 2006 4	Valladolid	0–1	Poli Ejido	Valladolid
CEST (UTC+2)				Stadium: José Zorrilla

24 September 2006 5	Xerez	1–1	Valladolid	Jerez de la Frontera
CEST (UTC+2)				Stadium: Chapín

1 October 2006 6	Valladolid	2–3	Salamanca	Valladolid
CEST (UTC+2)				Stadium: José Zorrilla

7 October 2006 7	Valladolid	1–0	Lorca Deportiva	Valladolid
CEST (UTC+2)				Stadium: José Zorrilla

15 October 2006 8	Ponferradina	2–2	Valladolid	Ponferrada
CEST (UTC+2)				Stadium: El Toralín

21 October 2006 9	Valladolid	1–0	Elche	Valladolid
CEST (UTC+2)				Stadium: José Zorrilla

29 October 2006 10	Málaga	0–1	Valladolid	Málaga
CET (UTC+1)				Stadium: La Rosaleda

5 November 2006 11	Valladolid	4–0	Real Madrid Castilla	Valladolid
CET (UTC+1)				Stadium: José Zorrilla

12 November 2006 12	Vecindario	1–2	Valladolid	Vecindario
CET (UTC+1)				Stadium: Estadio Municipal de Vecindario

19 November 2006 13	Valladolid	1–0	Tenerife	Valladolid
CET (UTC+1)				Stadium: José Zorrilla

26 November 2006 14	Murcia	1–4	Valladolid	Murcia
CET (UTC+1)				Stadium: Estadio Nueva Condomina

3 December 2006 15	Valladolid	2–2	Almería	Valladolid
CET (UTC+1)				Stadium: José Zorrilla

10 December 2006 16	Cádiz	0–0	Valladolid	Cádiz
CET (UTC+1)				Stadium: Ramón de Carranza

16 December 2006 17	Valladolid	1–0	Castellón	Valladolid
CET (UTC+1)				Stadium: José Zorrilla

21 December 2006 18	Hércules	2–2	Valladolid	Alicante
CET (UTC+1)				Stadium: Estadio José Rico Pérez

7 January 2007 19	Valladolid	1–0	Alavés	Valladolid
CET (UTC+1)				Stadium: José Zorrilla

13 January 2007 20	Albacete	0–2	Valladolid	Albacete
CET (UTC+1)				Stadium: Carlos Belmonte

21 January 2007 21	Valladolid	2–0	Numancia	Valladolid
CET (UTC+1)				Stadium: José Zorrilla

27 January 2007 22	Valladolid	1–0	Sporting Gijón	Valladolid
CET (UTC+1)				Stadium: José Zorrilla

3 February 2007 23	Las Palmas	2–2	Valladolid	Las Palmas
CET (UTC+1)				Stadium: Estadio Gran Canaria

11 February 2007 24	Valladolid	1–0	Ciudad de Murcia	Valladolid
CET (UTC+1)				Stadium: José Zorrilla

18 February 2007 25	Poli Ejido	2–3	Valladolid	El Ejido
CET (UTC+1)				Stadium: Santo Domingo

25 February 2007 26	Valladolid	1–1	Xerez	Valladolid
CET (UTC+1)				Stadium: José Zorrilla

4 March 2007 27	Salamanca	1–1	Valladolid	Villares de la Reina
CET (UTC+1)				Stadium: El Helmántico

11 March 2007 28	Lorca Deportiva	0–2	Valladolid	Lorca
CET (UTC+1)				Stadium: Francisco Artés Carrasco

18 March 2007 29	Valladolid	1–0	Ponferradina	Valladolid
CET (UTC+1)				Stadium: José Zorrilla

25 March 2007 30	Elche	0–1	Valladolid	Elche
CEST (UTC+2)				Stadium: Martínez Valero

1 April 2007 31	Valladolid	1–0	Málaga	Valladolid
CEST (UTC+2)				Stadium: José Zorrilla

7 April 2007 32	Real Madrid Castilla	1–3	Valladolid	Madrid
CEST (UTC+2)				Stadium: Alfredo Di Stéfano

15 April 2007 33	Valladolid	3–0	Vecindario	Valladolid
CEST (UTC+2)				Stadium: José Zorrilla

22 April 2007 34	Tenerife	0–2	Valladolid	Santa Cruz de Tenerife
CEST (UTC+2)				Stadium: Estadio de los Juegos Mediterráneos

29 April 2007 35	Valladolid	1–1	Murcia	Valladolid
CEST (UTC+2)				Stadium: José Zorrilla

6 May 2007 36	Almería	3–2	Valladolid	Almería
CEST (UTC+2)				Stadium: Estadio de los Juegos Mediterráneos

13 May 2007 37	Valladolid	2–2	Cádiz	Valladolid
CEST (UTC+2)				Stadium: José Zorrilla

20 May 2007 38	Castellón	2–1	Valladolid	Castellón
CEST (UTC+2)				Stadium: Nou Estadi Castàlia

26 May 2007 39	Valladolid	0–1	Hércules	Valladolid
CEST (UTC+2)				Stadium: José Zorrilla

3 June 2007 40	Alavés	1–2	Valladolid	Vitoria-Gasteiz
CEST (UTC+2)				Stadium: Mendizorrotza

10 June 2007 41	Valladolid	4–2	Albacete	Valladolid
CEST (UTC+2)				Stadium: José Zorrilla

16 June 2007 42	Numancia	1–2	Valladolid	Soria
CEST (UTC+2)				Stadium: Nuevo Estadio Los Pajaritos

=== Copa del Rey ===
20 September 2006 Second round	Lorca Deportiva	0–1	Valladolid	Lorca
CEST (UTC+2)				Stadium: Estadio Francisco Artés Carrasco

4 October 2006 Third round	Elche	0–1	Valladolid	Elche
CEST (UTC+2)				Stadium: Martínez Valero

25 October 2006 Round of 32; 1st leg	Valladolid	1–0	Gimnàstic	Valladolid
CET (UTC+1)				Stadium: José Zorrilla

8 November 2006 Round of 32; 2nd leg	Gimnàstic	1–3 (1–4 agg.)	Valladolid	Tarragona
CET (UTC+1)				Stadium: Nou Estadi de Tarragona

10 January 2007 Round of 16; 1st leg	Valladolid	2–1	Villarreal	Valladolid
CET (UTC+1)				Stadium: José Zorrilla

17 January 2007 Round of 16; 2nd leg	Villarreal	0–1 (1–3 agg.)	Valladolid	Villarreal
CET (UTC+1)				Stadium: El Madrigal

31 January 2007 Quarter-finals; 1st leg	Deportivo La Coruña	4–1	Valladolid	A Coruña
CET (UTC+1)				Stadium: Riazor

28 February 2007 Quarter-finals; 2nd leg	Valladolid	1–1 (2–5 agg.)	Deportivo La Coruña	Valladolid
CET (UTC+1)				Stadium: José Zorrilla
