= 2006–07 SD Ponferradina season =

SD Ponferradina
2006–07 season
- Head coach: Pichi Lucas (until 29 April); Jesús Tartilán
- Stadium: Estadio El Toralín
- Segunda División: 20th (relegated)
- Copa del Rey: Second round
- Average home league attendance: 6,429
- Biggest win: Ponferradina 3–0 UD Las Palmas; Ponferradina 4–1 Hércules
- Biggest defeat: Castellón 4–0 Ponferradina

The 2006–07 season was the 85th season in the history of SD Ponferradina and the club's first season ever in the second division of Spanish football. In addition to the domestic league, Ponferradina participated in this season's edition of the Copa del Rey.

== Competitions ==
=== Overall record ===
Competition	First match	Last match	Starting round	Final position	Record							
Competition	First match	Last match	Starting round	Final position	Pld	W	D	L	GF	GA	GD	Win %
Segunda División	27 August 2006	16 June 2007	Matchday 1	20th	42	11	13	18	45	61	−16	26.19
Copa del Rey	20 September 2006		Second round	Second round	1	0	0	1	0	1	−1	0.00
Total					43	11	13	19	45	62	−17	25.58

Source: Competitions

=== Segunda División ===
==== League table ====
Pos	Team	Pld	W	D	L	GF	GA	GD	Pts	Promotion or relegation
18	Las Palmas	42	13	12	17	51	59	−8	51	
19	Real Madrid Castilla (R)	42	13	10	19	55	67	−12	49	Relegation to Segunda División B
20	Ponferradina (R)	42	11	13	18	45	61	−16	46	Relegation to Segunda División B
21	Lorca Deportiva (R)	42	9	10	23	37	60	−23	37	Relegation to Segunda División B
22	Vecindario (R)	42	9	7	26	42	81	−39	34	Relegation to Segunda División B

Source: LFP - Liga Adelante
Rules for classification: 1st points; 2nd head-to-head points; 3rd head-to-head goal difference; 4th head-to-head goals scored; 5th goal difference; 6th number of goals scored; 7th Fair-play points
(R) Relegated

==== Results by round ====
Round	1	2	3	4	5	6	7	8	9	10	11	12	13	14	15	16	17	18	19	20	21	22	23	24	25	26	27	28	29	30	31	32	33	34	35	36	37	38	39	40	41	42
Ground	A	H	A	H	A	H	A	H	A	H	H	A	H	A	H	A	H	A	H	A	H	H	A	H	A	H	A	H	A	H	A	A	H	A	H	A	H	A	H	A	H	A
Result	L	W	L	W	D	W	L	D	L	L	D	D	L	L	W	D	L	D	W	L	L	W	L	L	D	W	D	D	L	W	D	L	D	L	D	W	D	L	L	L	W	W
Position/	20	11	14	8	8	6	13	12	13	17	18	18	19	21	21	20	21	19	19	20	20	20	21	21	21	20	20	20	20	20	20	20	20	20	20	20	20	20	20	20	20	20

Source: BDFutbol
A = Away; H = Home; W = Win; D = Draw; L = Loss

==== Matches ====
27 August 2006 1	Albacete	2–0	Ponferradina	Albacete

3 September 2006 2	Ponferradina	2–0	Numancia	Ponferrada

10 September 2006 3	Sporting Gijón	1–0	Ponferradina	Gijón

16 September 2006 4	Ponferradina	3–0	Las Palmas	Ponferrada

24 September 2006 5	Ciudad de Murcia	1–1	Ponferradina	Murcia

1 October 2006 6	Ponferradina	2–0	Poli Ejido	Ponferrada

8 October 2006 7	Xerez	3–1	Ponferradina	Jerez de la Frontera

15 October 2006 8	Ponferradina	2–2	Valladolid	Ponferrada

21 October 2006 9	Lorca Deportiva	1–0	Ponferradina	Lorca

29 October 2006 10	Ponferradina	1–2	Salamanca	Ponferrada
				Stadium: El Toralin

5 November 2006 11	Ponferradina	1–1	Elche	Ponferrada

12 November 2006 12	Málaga	1–1	Ponferradina	Málaga

19 November 2006 13	Ponferradina	0–3	Real Madrid Castilla	Ponferrada

25 November 2006 14	Vecindario	1–0	Ponferradina	Vecindario

2 December 2006 15	Ponferradina	1–0	Tenerife	Ponferrada

10 December 2006 16	Murcia	1–1	Ponferradina	Murcia

16 December 2006 17	Ponferradina	0–1	Almería	Ponferrada

20 December 2006 18	Cádiz	0–0	Ponferradina	Cádiz

7 January 2007 19	Ponferradina	1–0	Castellón	Ponferrada

14 January 2007 20	Hércules	3–0	Ponferradina	Alicante

21 January 2007 21	Ponferradina	0–2	Alavés	Ponferrada

27 January 2007 22	Ponferradina	4–3	Albacete	Ponferrada

4 February 2007 23	Numancia	1–0	Ponferradina	Soria

10 February 2007 24	Ponferradina	0–3	Sporting Gijón	Ponferrada

18 February 2007 25	Las Palmas	0–0	Ponferradina	Las Palmas

25 February 2007 26	Ponferradina	1–0	Ciudad de Murcia	Ponferrada

4 March 2007 27	Poli Ejido	1–1	Ponferradina	El Ejido

11 March 2007 28	Ponferradina	1–1	Xerez	Ponferrada

18 March 2007 29	Valladolid	1–0	Ponferradina	Valladolid

25 March 2007 30	Ponferradina	2–1	Lorca Deportiva	Ponferrada

1 April 2007 31	Salamanca	3–3	Ponferradina	Salamanca

8 April 2007 32	Elche	1–0	Ponferradina	Elche

15 April 2007 33	Ponferradina	2–2	Málaga	Ponferrada

22 April 2007 34	Real Madrid Castilla	3–1	Ponferradina	Madrid

29 April 2007 35	Ponferradina	3–3	Vecindario	Ponferrada

6 May 2007 36	Tenerife	0–1	Ponferradina	Santa Cruz de Tenerife

12 May 2007 37	Ponferradina	1–1	Murcia	Ponferrada

19 May 2007 38	Almería	3–1	Ponferradina	Almería

26 May 2007 39	Ponferradina	1–3	Cádiz	Ponferrada

3 June 2007 40	Castellón	4–0	Ponferradina	Castellón de la Plana

10 June 2007 41	Ponferradina	4–1	Hércules	Ponferrada

16 June 2007 42	Alavés	1–2	Ponferradina	Vitoria-Gasteiz

=== Copa del Rey ===
20 September 2006 Second round	Elche	1–0	Ponferradina	Elche
				Stadium: Estadio Manuel Martínez Valero
