= List of transfers of Segunda División – 2006–07 season =

This is a list of Spanish football transfers for the 2006–07 Segunda División season. Transfers are only allowed in limited transfer windows in summer and winter.

== Deportivo Alavés ==
In:

- (Equatorial Guinea) (Spain) Juan Epitié - Signed From CD Castellón
- (Spain) Angel - Signed From Ciudad de Murcia
- (Brazil) Wellington Paulista - Signed From Santos FC
- (Spain) Casar - Signed From Racing de Santander
- (Argentina) Brandan - Signed From Instituto Atlético Central Córdoba
- (Brazil) Gentil - Signed From Palmeiras
- (Spain) Mateo - Signed From Recreativo de Huelva
- (Spain) Toni Moral - Signed From Celta de Vigo

Out:

- (Spain) Gabriel Gomez - On Loan To Osasuna B
- (Spain) Ian Uranga - On Loan To Barakaldo CF
- (Brazil) Wesley Lopes - On Loan To Grasshopper Club Zürich
- (Brazil) Francisco Alberoni - On Loan To UD Las Palmas
- (Senegal) Pape Thiaw - On Loan To Lorca Deportiva CF
- (Spain) Josu Sarriegi - Transferred To Athletic de Bilbao
- (Spain) Juanito - Transferred To Real Sociedad
- (Equatorial Guinea) (Spain) Rodolfo Bodipo - Transferred To Deportivo de La Coruña
- (Argentina) Franco Costanzo - Transferred To FC Basel
- (Spain) Bernardo - On Loan To CD Tenerife
- (Spain) Poli - Transferred To Recreativo de Huelva
- (Brazil) Nené - Transferred To Celta de Vigo
- (Bulgaria) Blagoy Georgiev - Transferred To Red Star Belgrade
- (Uruguay) Antonio Pacheco - Return To Albacete Balompié
- (Gabon) Henry Antchouet - On Loan To AEL
- (Argentina) Mauricio Pellegrino - Retired

== Albacete Balompié ==
In:

- (Spain) José Zahinos - On Loan From Atlético Madrid
- (Spain) Antonio Calle - Signed From Recreativo de Huelva
- (Spain) Álvaro Cámara - Signed From Hércules CF
- (Spain) Noguerol - Signed From Elche CF
- (Spain) Kike - Signed From Benidorm CD
- (Spain) Peña - Signed From FC Barcelona B
- (Spain) Sanz - Signed From Racing de Ferrol
- (Chile) César Cortés - Signed From CD Universidad Católica
- (Argentina) (Spain) Biagini - Signed From Sporting de Gijón
- (Spain) Diego Alegre - Signed From Ciudad de Murcia
- (Spain) José Javier Barkero - Signed From Real Sociedad
- (Spain) Gorka Azkorra - Signed From Athletic de Bilbao
- (Spain) Héctor Bueno - Signed From Real Murcia
- (Spain) Valbuena - On Loan From Real Zaragoza

Out:

- (Chile) Nicolás Nuñez - On Loan To CD Everton de Viña del Mar
- (Spain) Juanlu - Return To Real Betis
- (Spain) Mingo - Transferred To Gimnàstic de Tarragona
- (Spain) Paco Peña - Transferred To Real Murcia
- (Spain) Álvaro Rubio - Transferred To Real Valladolid
- (Spain) Basti - Transferred To CD San Fernando
- (Spain) Luismi - Transferred To UE Lleida
- (Spain) Aranda - Return To Sevilla FC
- (Spain) Corona - Return To Real Zaragoza
- (Spain) Raúl Molina - Return To Rayo Vallecano
- (Spain) Garrido - Return To Valencia CF
- (Spain) Mikel - Transferred To Alicante CF
- (Spain) Sergio Santamaria - Transferred To UE Sant Andreu
- (Spain) Pablo García - On Loan To Orihuela CF
- (Spain) David Pirri - Transferred To Gimnàstic de Tarragona
- (Spain) Mario Bermejo - Transferred To UD Almería
- (Spain) Catalá - Transferred To Lorca Deportiva CF
- (Uruguay) Antonio Pacheco - Transferred To Club de Gimnasia y Esgrima La Plata

== UD Almería ==
In:

- (Spain) Rodri - On Loan From Deportivo de La Coruña
- (Netherlands) Westerveld - Signed From Portsmouth F.C.
- (Spain) Cabrera - Signed From Pontevedra CF
- (Spain) Bruno Saltor - Signed From UE Lleida
- (France) de Palmas - Signed From Racing de Ferrol
- (Spain) Mané - Signed From Ciudad de Murcia
- (Spain) Mairata - Signed From SD Eibar
- (Spain) Alberto - Signed From UD Las Palmas
- (Spain) Mario Bermejo - Signed From Albacete Balompié
- (Spain) Corona - On Loan From Real Zaragoza
- (Spain) Gorka Larrea - On Loan From Real Sociedad

Out:

- (Spain) Antonio Velamazán - Transferred To CE L'Hospitalet
- (Spain) Carlos Sanchez - Return To Real Madrid Castilla
- (Spain) Cervián - Transferred To UE Sant Andreu
- (Spain) Jonathan Soriano - Return To RCD Espanyol
- (Spain) Manolo - Transferred To Levante UD
- (Spain) Ross Cruse - Transferred To De4tevo
- (Spain) Jaime Ramos - Transferred To Écija Balompié
- (Spain) Luna - Transferred To Écija Balompié
- (Spain) Martin Vellisca - Transferred To Logroñés CF
- (Spain) Raul Lozano - Transferred To Orihuela CF
- (Spain) Marc Francolí - Transferred To Águilas CF
- (Spain) Muley - On Loan To CD Vera de Almería
- (Spain) Pelegrina - Transferred To Águilas CF
- (Paraguay) Barreto - On Loan To Cerro Porteño
- (Uruguay) Ricardo Varela - Released
- (Spain) Miguel Angel Soria López - Released
- (Romania) Constantin Gâlcă - Released

== Cádiz CF ==
In:

- (Spain) Abel Buades - Signed From Gimnàstic de Tarragona
- (Spain) Neru - Signed From Racing de Santander
- (Spain) Pablo Hernández - On Loan From Valencia CF
- (Spain) Miguel - Return From CD Castellón
- (Spain) Oscar De Paula - Signed From Real Sociedad
- (Spain) Nano - Signed From Getafe CF
- (Spain) Sergio Rodriguez - Signed From UE Lleida
- (Spain) Cesar - Signed From SD Eibar
- (Spain) Velazquez - Return From Lorca Deportiva CF

Out:

- (Spain) Sergio Rodríguez - On Loan To UE Lleida
- (Spain) Ezequiel Arana - On Loan To Racing Club Portuense
- (Spain) Raul Navas - On Loan To CD Tenerife
- (Colombia) De la Cuesta - On Loan To Real Valladolid
- (Spain) Varela - Transferred To Ciudad de Murcia
- (Spain) De Gomar - On Loan To AD Ceuta
- (Equatorial Guinea) (Spain) Benjamín - Return To Real Betis
- (Uruguay) (Italy) Estoyanoff - Return To Valencia CF
- (Portugal) Mario Silva - Transferred To Boavista F.C.
- (Serbia) Mirosavljevic - Transferred To FK Partizan
- (Argentina) (Italy) Berizzo - Released

== CD Castellón ==
In:

- (Spain) Antonio López - Signed From Sevilla FC
- (Argentina) Gustavo Oberman - On Loan From Argentinos Juniors
- (Spain) Imanol Agirretxe - On Loan From Real Sociedad
- (Spain) Nakor - Signed From UE Lleida
- (Spain) Txiki - Signed From Córdoba CF
- (Spain) Carlos Sánchez - Signed From Real Madrid Castilla
- (Argentina) (Spain) Dani Pendín - Signed From Xerez CD
- (Spain) Baigorri - Return From Alicante CF
- (Spain) Natalio - Return From FC Cartagena
- (Spain) Aurelio - Signed From Xerez CD
- (Spain) Ibon Gutiérrez] - Signed From Athletic de Bilbao

Out:

- (Equatorial Guinea) (Spain) Juan Epitié - Transferred To Deportivo Alavés
- (Colombia) Mauricio Romero - Transferred To Atlético Bucaramanga
- (Spain) Miguel - Return To Cádiz CF
- (Spain) Torrecilla - Transferred To Ciudad de Murcia
- (Spain) Raúl Sánchez - Transferred To CD Tenerife
- (Spain) Jonan García - Transferred To Ciudad de Murcia
- (Spain) Zafra - Transferred To Orihuela CF
- (Spain) Segovia - Transferred To Mérida UD
- (Spain) Pardo - Transferred To UDA Gramenet
- (Japan) Kenji Fukuda - Transferred To CD Numancia
- (Spain) Marqués - Transferred To Atlético Madrid B
- (Spain) José Mari - Transferred To CE Sabadell FC

== Ciudad de Murcia ==
In:

- (Brazil) Thiago Schumacher - On Loan From Udinese Calcio
- (Spain) Rubén Martín - Signed From Albacete Balompié
- (Spain) Daniel Fragoso - Signed From FC Barcelona B
- (Spain) Torrecilla - Signed From CD Castellón
- (Spain) Varela - Signed From Cádiz CF
- (Spain) Gaizka Saizar - Signed From Levante B
- (Spain) Xabi Jiménez - On Loan From Recreativo de Huelva
- (Spain) Ceballos - Signed From Levante UD
- (Spain) Borja Criado - Signed From Espanyol B

Out:

- (Spain) Jonan García - Transferred To Aris Thessaloniki F.C.
- (Venezuela) Miku - Return To Valencia B
- (Spain) Carlos Saura - On Loan To CD Eldense
- (Spain) Ángel - Transferred To Deportivo Alavés
- (Spain) Diego Alegre - Transferred To Albacete Balompié
- (Spain) Piti - Return To Real Zaragoza
- (Spain) Raúl Pérez - Transferred To Terrassa FC
- (Spain) Daniel González - Transferred To Córdoba CF
- (Spain) Raúl Medina - Return To Atlético Madrid
- (Spain) Paco Esteban - Return To Málaga CF
- (Spain) Mané - Transferred To UD Almería
- (Spain) Sergio Torres - Transferred To CD Tenerife
- (Cameroon) Kome - Return To RCD Mallorca

== Polideportivo Ejido ==
In:

- (Spain) Jonathan Soriano - On Loan From RCD Espanyol
- (Spain) Ortiz - On Loan From Atlético Madrid
- (Spain) Usero - Signed From Málaga CF
- (Spain) Quero - Signed From AD Alcorcón
- (Spain) Mikel Rico - Signed From UB Conquense
- (Spain) Manolo - On Loan From FC Barcelona B
- (Argentina) Arano - Signed From Racing Club de Avellaneda
- (Hungary) Éger - Signed From Debreceni VSC
- (Spain) Robusté - On Loan From RCD Espanyol

Out:

- (Hungary) Éger - Return To Debreceni VSC
- (Spain) Oscar Antequera - Transferred To FC Cartagena
- (Spain) Keko - Transferred To UE Lleida
- (Spain) Marcos Navas - Return To Sevilla B
- (Spain) Llorens - Transferred To Rayo Vallecano
- (Spain) Kiko - Transferred To Lorca Deportiva CF
- (Spain) Velasco - Transferred To S.S. Reyes

== Elche CF ==
In:

- (Brazil) Douglas Rodrigues - On Loan From FC Chiasso
- (Uruguay) Fernando Fajardo - Signed From Fenix de Montevideo
- (Uruguay) Fabián Coelho - Signed From Club Nacional de Football
- (France) (European Union) Bouchard - Signed From Racing de Ferrol
- (Spain) Chispa - On Loan From Valencia CF
- (Poland) (European Union) Lukasiewicz - Signed From Polonia Warszawa
- (Spain) Óscar Díaz - Signed From Real Madrid Castilla
- (Spain) Miguel Cedrón - Signed From CD Numancia
- (Argentina) (Spain) Gastón Casas - Signed From Recreativo de Huelva
- (Spain) Manolo Pérez - Signed From Hércules CF

Out:

- (France) Philippe Toledo - On Loan To Levante B
- (Spain) Noguerol - Transferred To Albacete Balompié
- (Spain) Nino - Transferred To Levante UD
- (Spain) Quique Medina - Retired
- (Spain) Sergio Aragoneses - Transferred To Hércules CF
- (Spain) Txiki - Transferred To UD Las Palmas
- (Spain) Unanua - Transferred To Alicante CF
- (Spain) Quesada - On Loan To Real Jaén
- (Spain) Luis Gil - Transferred To CD Tenerife

== Sporting de Gijón ==
In:

- (Spain) Barral - Signed From Real Madrid Castilla
- (Spain) Diego Castro - Signed From Málaga B
- (Spain) Andreu - Signed From Málaga B
- (Spain) Samuel San Jose - On Loan From Racing de Santander
- (Colombia) Congo - Signed From Levante UD

Out

- (Spain) Pablo Alvarez - Transferred To Deportivo de La Coruña
- (Spain) Juan Prendes - Transferred To Gimnàstic de Tarragona
- (Argentina) (Spain) Biagini - Transferred To Albacete Balompié
- (Spain) Pablo Lago - Transferred To CD Numancia
- (Spain) Miguel Carmena - Transferred To Racing de Ferrol
- (Argentina) (Italy) Calandria - Transferred To Hércules CF
- (Spain) Dorado - Transferred To RCD Mallorca
- (Netherlands) (Spain) Jeffrey Hoogervorst - Transferred To Real Madrid Castilla
- (Spain) Enguix - Transferred To Rayo Vallecano
- (Spain) Alejandro Garcia - On Loan To Gimnástica de Torrelavega
- (Spain) Moises Blanco - On Loan To CF Fuenlabrada
- (Spain) Jose Angel - On Loan To UD Puertollano

== Hércules CF ==
In:

- (Spain) Ismael Falcón - On Loan From Atlético Madrid
- (Spain) Carmelo - On Loan From Levante UD
- (Paraguay) Julio Irrazábal - Signed From Club Nacional
- (Paraguay) Líder Mármol - Signed From Club Guaraní
- (Spain) Xisco Nadal - On Loan From Villarreal CF
- (Spain) Piti - Signed From Real Zaragoza
- (Spain) Sergio Aragoneses - Signed From Elche CF
- (Argentina) Graff - Signed From CD Numancia
- (Argentina) Ariel Montenegro - Signed From CD Numancia
- (Spain) Juanlu Hens - Signed From UE Lleida
- (Spain) Mantecón - Signed From Alicante CF
- (Uruguay) De los Santos - Signed From RCD Mallorca
- (Togo) Kossi Agassa - Signed From FC Metz
- (Argentina) Calandria - Signed From Sporting de Gijón
- (Argentina) Diego Mateo - Signed From San Lorenzo de Almagro
- (Spain) Ignacio Benítez - Signed From Recreativo de Huelva
- (Spain) Tote - Signed From Real Valladolid
- (Spain) David Rangel - Signed From UE Lleida

Out:

- (Spain) Ignacio Benítez - On Loan To Rayo Vallecano
- (Mexico) Aarón Galindo - On Loan To Grasshopper Club Zürich
- (Argentina) Rolando Schiavi - Transferred To Grêmio Foot-Ball Porto Alegrense
- (Argentina) Lupidio - Transferred To Benidorm CD
- (Spain) Álvaro Cámara - Transferred To Albacete Balompié
- (Spain) Miguel de las Cuevas - Transferred To Atlético Madrid
- (Spain) Julián Palacios - Transferred To CE Mataró
- (Spain) Carlitos - Released
- (Spain) Toché - Return To Atlético Madrid
- (Spain) Dani Tortolero - Transferred To UD Salamanca
- (Spain) Sisi - Transferred To Real Valladolid
- (Spain) Sergio Martínez - On Loan To FC Jove Español San Vicente
- (Spain) Manolo Pérez - Transferred To Elche CF
- (Spain) Vicente Verdejo - Transferred To UD Vecindario
- (Uruguay) Jimmy Schmidt - Transferred To Central Español
- (Spain) Dani Navarrete - Transferred To Terrassa FC
- (Spain) Kiko Ratón - Transferred To Orihuela CF

== Málaga CF ==
In:

- (Spain) Ivan Rosado - Signed From CA Osasuna
- (Argentina) (Spain) Gabriel Schürrer - Signed From Olympiacos
- (Spain) Calleja - Signed From Villarreal CF
- (Spain) Sandro - Signed From Levante UD
- (Spain) Jesule - Signed From Levante UD
- (Uruguay) O.J. Morales - Signed From Real Valladolid
- (Spain) Jonathan Valle - On Loan From Racing de Santander
- (Serbia) Stevan Stošić - Signed From OFK Beograd
- (Serbia) (Belgium) Bratislav Ristić - Signed From FC Metalurh Donetsk

Out:

- (Spain) Francis Duran - Transferred To Liverpool
- (Spain) Paco Esteban - Transferred To Polideportivo Ejido
- (Spain) Salva Ballesta - On Loan To Levante UD
- (Spain) César Navas - On Loan To Gimnàstic de Tarragona
- (Spain) Nacho - Transferred To Getafe CF
- (Spain) Juan Rodríguez - Transferred To Deportivo de La Coruña
- (Spain) Antonio López - Return To Sevilla FC
- (Spain) Alexis - Transferred To Getafe CF
- (Portugal) (European Union) Duda - Transferred To Sevilla FC
- (Spain) Gerardo - Transferred To Real Sociedad
- (Spain) Jorge Pina - Transferred To UD Salamanca
- (Portugal) (European Union) Litos - Transferred To Académica
- (Spain) Diego Castro - Transferred To Sporting de Gijón
- (Spain) Fernando Sanz - New President
- (Brazil) Ricardo Bóvio - Transferred To Panathinaikos
- (Spain) Calatayud - Transferred To Racing de Santander
- (Peru) González-Vigil - Transferred To Zulte-Waregem

== CD Numancia ==
In:

- (Spain) Gorka Brit - Signed From CA Osasuna
- (Spain) Sietes - Signed From Watford F.C.
- (Spain) Fran Moreno - On Loan From CA Osasuna
- (Guinea) Baio - Signed From Tirsense
- (Spain) Sergio Ortega - Signed From Racing B
- (Spain) Juanra - Signed From Levante B
- (Spain) Javier Tarantino - On Loan From Athletic de Bilbao
- (Japan) Fukuda - Signed From CD Castellón
- (France) Béranger - Signed From Racing de Ferrol
- (Spain) Pablo Lago - Signed From Sporting de Gijón
- (Spain) Felipe Guréndez - Signed From Athletic de Bilbao
- (Spain) Boris - Signed From Real Sociedad
- (Spain) Bolo - Signed From Gimnàstic de Tarragona
- (Spain) Julio Alvarez - Signed From Real Murcia
- (Spain) Pulido - Signed From Real Murcia

Out

- (Guatemala) Dwight Pezzarossi - Transferred To Deportivo Marquense
- (Spain) Mario Martínez - On Loan To Zamora CF
- (Spain) Pablo Niño - Return To Real Betis
- (Spain) Ibon Gutiérrez - Return To Athletic de Bilbao
- (Spain) Gorka Azkorra - Return To Athletic de Bilbao
- (Argentina) (Italy) Patricio Graff - Transferred To Hércules CF
- (Argentina) (Italy) Ariel Montenegro - Transferred To Hércules CF
- (Spain) Juan Ochoa - Transferred To Real Murcia
- (Spain) Antonio José Gonzalez - Transferred To Córdoba CF
- (Spain) Jordi Navas - Transferred To UE Sant Andreu
- (Spain) Julio Pineda - Transferred To Córdoba CF
- (Spain) Antonio Tomillo - Transferred To CD Villanueva
- (Spain) Miguel Cedron - Transferred To Elche CF
- (Spain) Angel Perez - Transferred To CF Palencia
- (Spain) Juanpa - Transferred To Lorca Deportiva CF
- (Spain) Luis Tevenet - Transferred To UE Lleida
- (Colombia) Hamilton Ricard - Transferred To Danubio F.C.
- (Spain) José Yanguas - Transferred To CD Alfaro

== UD Las Palmas ==
In:

- (Brazil) Francisco Alberoni - On Loan From Deportivo Alavés
- (Spain) Roberto Losada - Signed From Real Valladolid
- (Argentina) Nacho González - Signed From Arsenal de Sarandí
- (Spain) Txiki - Signed From Elche CF
- (Spain) Viyuela - Signed From UD Vecindario
- (Spain) Miguel Cobas - Signed From Racing de Ferrol
- (Spain) Castillo - On Loan From Real Sociedad B
- (Spain) Santamaría - Signed From CA Osasuna
- (Spain) Nacho Garro - On Loan From Real Murcia
- (Spain) Tomi - Signed From CD Tenerife
- (Spain) Roberto Trashorras - Signed From CD Numancia

Out:

- (Serbia) Goran Maric - Return To Celta de Vigo B
- (Spain) David Rodríguez - Return To Atlético Madrid B
- (Spain) Curro - Transferred To CD Villanueva
- (Spain) Alberto - Transferred To UD Almería
- (Spain) Javi Ortega - On Loan To Castillo CF
- (Spain) Alejandro Suárez - Transferred To Universidad de Las Palmas CF
- (Spain) Mario Martínez - Return To CD Numancia
- (Spain) Jaime Pérez - Transferred To Castillo CF

== Lorca Deportiva ==
In:

- (Argentina) Julio Barroso - Signed From RC Avellaneda
- (Argentina) Santiago Ladino - Signed From CA Vélez Sársfield
- (Spain) Capi - On Loan From Real Murcia
- (Senegal) Pape Thiaw - On Loan From Deportivo Alavés
- (Spain) Yagüe - On Loan From RCD Espanyol
- (Spain) Iván Ania - On Loan From Cádiz CF
- (Spain) Maikel - Signed From CD Tenerife
- (Spain) Rueda - Signed From Águilas CF
- (Spain) Javi Rodriguez - On Loan From Levante UD
- (Spain) Juanpa - Signed From CD Numancia
- (Spain) Israel - Signed From Córdoba CF
- (Spain) Iker Begoña - Signed From Recreativo de Huelva
- (Spain) Catalá - Signed From Albacete Balompié

Out

- (Spain) Kiko - Transferred To Real Oviedo
- (Spain) Chando - On Loan To Zamora CF
- (Bolivia) Pinedo - Return To Cádiz C
- (Spain) Aguilar - Transferred To CD La Unión
- (Spain) Maldonado - Return To Real Betis
- (Spain) Fernando Vega - Transferred To Real Betis
- (Spain) Paco Jurado - Transferred To Calasparra FC
- (Spain) Iñaki Bea - Transferred To Real Valladolid
- (Spain) Marc Bertran - Transferred To CD Tenerife
- (Spain) Perona - On Loan To Levante B
- (Spain) Iñaki Berruet - Transferred To Real Unión
- (Spain) Velazquez - Return To Cádiz CF
- (Argentina) Facundo Sava - Transferred To Racing Club de Avellaneda

== SD Ponferradina ==
In:

- (Spain) Daniel Cifuentes - On Loan From Real Sociedad
- (Morocco) Nabil Baha - Signed From US Créteil-Lusitanos
- (Argentina) David Ramírez - Signed From Olimpo de Bahía Blanca
- (Spain) Jotha - Signed From Real Madrid Castilla
- (Spain) Robles - Signed From Real Madrid Castilla
- (Uruguay) Ignacio Risso - Signed From Quilmes Atlético Club
- (Spain) Nacho - Signed From Racing de Ferrol
- (Argentina) Raponi - Signed From Instituto Atlético Central Córdoba
- (Spain) Espasandín - On Loan From Real Valladolid

Out:

- (Spain) Vicente Uriz - Transferred To CD Lugo
- (Spain) Diego Ribera - Transferred To Orihuela CF
- (Spain) Guillermo Escribano - On Loan To Osasuna B
- (Spain) Alberto Garcia - Transferred To Mérida UD
- (Argentina) Pavone - Transferred To Logroñés CF
- (Spain) Castilla - Transferred To UE Lleida
- (Spain) Jose Antonio Soto - Transferred To CD Orientación Marítima

== Real Madrid Castilla ==
In:

- (Spain) Carlos Sanchez - Return From UD Almería
- (Spain) Manuel Pérez - Signed From Córdoba CF
- (Netherlands) (European Union) Jeffrey Hoogervorst - Signed From Sporting de Gijón
- (Spain) Dani Guillén - Graduated From Real Madrid C
- (Spain) Esteban Granero - Graduated From Real Madrid C
- (Spain) Rodri - Graduated From Real Madrid C
- (Spain) Rayco - Graduated From Real Madrid C
- (Spain) Santacruz - Graduated From Real Madrid C
- (Spain) Torres - Graduated From Real Madrid C
- (Jordan) Thaer Fayed - Graduated From Real Madrid C
- (Spain) Alberto Bueno - Graduated From Real Madrid C
- (Spain) Antonio Adán - Graduated From Real Madrid C
- (Spain) Adrián González - Graduated From Real Madrid C
- (Spain) Pedro Mosquera - Graduated From Real Madrid C
- (Spain) Alberto Bueno - Graduated From Real Madrid C
- (Spain) Juan Mata - Graduated From Real Madrid C
- (Spain) Javier Soria - Graduated From Real Madrid C
- (Spain) Jonathan Ñíguez - Graduated From Real Madrid C

Out:

- (Netherlands) Jeffrey Hoogervorst - Transferred To FC Barcelona
- (Spain) Cobeño - Transferred To Sevilla FC
- (Spain) Barral - Transferred To Sporting de Gijón
- (Spain) Oscar Diaz - Transferred To Elche CF
- (Spain) Carlos Sanchez - Transferred To CD Castellón
- (Spain) Jotha - Transferred To SD Ponferradina
- (Spain) Robles - Transferred To SD Ponferradina
- (Spain) Adrián Martin - Transferred To Real Murcia
- (Brazil) (Italy) Filipe Luis - Transferred To Deportivo de La Coruña
- (Spain) Rubén González - Transferred To Racing de Santander
- (Spain) Roberto Soldado - On Loan To CA Osasuna
- (Spain) Álvaro Arbeloa - Transferred To Deportivo de La Coruña
- (Spain) Jurado - Transferred To Atlético Madrid
- (Spain) Javier Balboa - On Loan To Racing de Santander
- (Spain) Ernesto Gómez - Transferred To Málaga CF

== Real Murcia ==
In:

- (Spain) Paco Lledó - On Loan From Real Valladolid
- (England) Noel-Williams - Signed From Burnley F.C.
- (Brazil) Emerson de Andrade - Signed From AA Ponte Preta
- (Spain) Bruno Herrero - On Loan From Sevilla FC
- (Spain) Abel - Signed From Malaga B
- (Spain) Notario - Signed From Sevilla FC
- (Spain) Paco Peña - Signed From Albacete Balompié
- (Spain) Antoñito - On Loan From Sevilla FC
- (Spain) Jofre - Signed From RCD Espanyol
- (Spain) Ochoa - Signed From CD Numancia
- (Spain) Gallardo - On Loan From Sevilla FC
- (Spain) Adrian Martin - Signed From Real Madrid Castilla
- (Spain) Aranda - Signed From Sevilla FC
- (Spain) Ramón - Signed From Recreativo de Huelva
- (Spain) Pablo Ruiz - On Loan From Sevilla FC

Out

- (Spain) Jesus Tato - On Loan To UE Lleida
- (Spain) Capi - On Loan To Lorca Deportiva CF
- (Spain) Palacios - Transferred To Granada CF
- (Spain) Hector Bueno - Transferred To Albacete Balompié
- (Spain) Nacho Garro - Transferred To UD Las Palmas
- (Spain) Urzelai - Transferred To UD Vecindario
- (Spain) Julio Alvarez - Transferred To CD Numancia
- (Spain) Pulido - Transferred To CD Numancia
- (Argentina) Carrera - Transferred To Argentinos Juniors
- (Uruguay) Salgueiro - Transferred To Danubio F.C.
- (Greece) Chalkias - Transferred To Aris Thessaloniki
- (Spain) Pablo Sierra - Transferred To UE Lleida
- (Spain) Sebastian Corona - On Loan To Águilas CF
- (Germany) Markus Kreuz - Transferred To Kickers Offenbach
- (Paraguay) Aureliano Torres - Transferred To Club 12 de Octubre
- (Uruguay) Diego Alonso - Transferred To Club Nacional de Football

== UD Salamanca ==
In:

- (Spain) Alberto - Signed From Real Unión
- (France) Gomes - On Loan From Real Sociedad B
- (Spain) Jorge Pina - Signed From Málaga B
- (Spain) Dani Lopez - Signed From Marino
- (Spain) David Fas - Signed From Universidad de Las Palmas CF
- (Spain) Dani Tortolero - Signed From Hércules CF
- (Spain) Susaeta - On Loan From Real Sociedad B
- (Spain) Tete - Signed From Xerez CD
- (Mexico) Carlos Vela - On Loan From Celta de Vigo
- (Spain) Braulio - On Loan From Atlético Madrid
- (Brazil) Roberto da Souza - On Loan From Celta de Vigo

Out:

- (Spain) Abel Valenzuela - On Loan To CD Guijuelo
- (Venezuela) Miku - Return To Valencia B
- (Spain) Jose Luis Deus - Transferred To Terrassa FC
- (Spain) Totti - On Loan To CD Guijuelo
- (Spain) Angel Camaño - Transferred To Cultural y Deportiva Leonesa
- (Spain) Victor Blanco - On Loan To CD Linares
- (Spain) Jacobo Campos - Transferred To Real Oviedo
- (Spain) Robert - On Loan To Zamora CF
- (Spain) Koeman - On Loan To CF Palencia

== CD Tenerife ==
In:

- (Equatorial Guinea) (Spain) Juvenal - Signed From Recreativo de Huelva
- (Spain) Manolo Martinez - Signed From Gimnàstic de Tarragona
- (Spain) Manuel Blanco - Signed From Sevilla FC
- (Spain) Oscar Perez - Signed From Bolton Wanderers F.C.
- (Spain) Castiñeiras - Signed From SD Eibar
- (Spain) Raúl Sánchez - Signed From CD Castellón
- (Spain) Marc Bertran - Signed From Lorca Deportiva CF
- (Spain) Ruano - On Loan From Córdoba CF
- (Spain) Suso - Signed From AD Laguna
- (Spain) Pablo Sicilia - On Loan From Atlético Madrid
- (Spain) Bernardo - On Loan From Deportivo Alavés
- (Spain) Raul Navas - On Loan From Cádiz CF
- (Spain) Clavero - Signed From CA Osasuna
- (Spain) Culebras - Signed From Levante UD
- (Spain) Sergio Torres - Signed From Atlético Madrid
- (Poland) Tomasz Frankowski - On Loan From Wolverhampton Wanderers F.C.

Out

- (Spain) Tomás Correa Miranda - On Loan To CF Badalona
- (Spain) Juan Ramón Ruano - On Loan To Orihuela CF
- (Argentina) Andrés San Martín - Transferred To Arsenal de Sarandí
- (France) Frantz Bertín - On Loan To Atlético Madrid B
- (Spain) Kirian - Transferred To UD Vecindario
- (Argentina) (Spain) Cristian Alvarez - Return To Racing de Santander
- (Spain) Jesus Vazquez - Transferred To Recreativo de Huelva
- (Spain) Edu Moya - Transferred To Recreativo de Huelva
- (Spain) Maikel - Transferred To Lorca Deportiva CF
- (Spain) Toni Moral - Return To Celta B
- (Spain) Airam - Transferred To Lucena CF
- (Brazil) Cocito - Transferred To Real Murcia
- (Brazil) William - Return To Clube Atlético Paranaense
- (Spain) Adolfo Baines - Transferred To Milton Keynes Dons F.C.
- (Argentina) (Spain) Aaron Scheithe - On Loan To UD Lanzarote
- (Slovakia) Kelemen - Transferred To UD Vecindario
- (Spain) Toñito - Transferred To NK Rijeka
- (Portugal) Joao Paulo - Transferred To F.C. Paços de Ferreira
- (Spain) Roberto Carlos - On Loan To Málaga B
- (Brazil) Cesar Belli - Transferred To Clube Atlético Paranaense
- (Argentina) Daniel Fagiani - Transferred To Talleres de Córdoba
- (Argentina) LaPaglia - On Loan To Vitória F.C.
- (Argentina) Almirón - Transferred To Club Atlético Lanús

== Real Valladolid ==
In:

- (Cameroon) Daniel Kome - Signed From RCD Mallorca
- (Bulgaria) Vladimir Manchev - On Loan From Levante UD
- (Spain) Ikaki Bea - Signed From Lorca Deportiva CF
- (Colombia) de la Cuesta - On Loan From Cádiz CF
- (Spain) Alvaro Rubio - Signed From Albacete Balompié
- (Spain) Sisi - On Loan From Valencia CF
- (Spain) Alberto - Signed From Real Sociedad
- (Spain) Toché - On Loan From Atlético Madrid
- (Spain) Borja Fernández - signed from Real Madrid
- (Spain) García Calvo - signed from Atlético Madrid

Out

- (Spain) Paco Lledó - On Loan To Real Murcia
- (Paraguay) Diego Figueredo - On Loan To Godoy Cruz Antonio Tomba
- (Spain) Roberto Losada - Transferred To UD Las Palmas
- (Spain) Sousa - Transferred To Getafe CF
- (Spain) Casar - Return To Racing de Santander
- (Argentina) (Italy) Bizarri - Transferred To Gimnàstic de Tarragona
- (Spain) Mario - Transferred To Recreativo de Huelva
- (Uruguay) O.J. Morales - Transferred To Málaga CF
- (Spain) Tote - Transferred To Hércules CF
- (Spain) Ramis - Return To RCD Mallorca
- (Spain) Carmona - Return To RCD Mallorca
- (Spain) Robles - Transferred To Polideportivo Ejido
- (Spain) Cristobal Carreño - Transferred To Mérida
- (Spain) Teofilio García - On Loan To Cartagena

== UD Vecindario ==
In:

- (Uruguay) Carlos García - On Loan From Liverpool FC
- (Spain) Garcia Granero - Signed From Xerez CD
- (Croatia) Nenad Mirosavljevic - On Loan From FK Partizan
- (Argentina) Sebastián Carrizo - On Loan From CA Independiente
- (Portugal) Mozer - Signed From C.D. Trofense
- (Spain) Kirian - Signed From CD Tenerife
- (Spain) Francisco Jiménez Tejada - On Loan From Deportivo de La Coruña
- (Spain) Markel Bergara - On Loan From Real Sociedad
- (Spain) Verdejo - Signed From Hércules CF
- (Argentina) Javier Morales - On Loan From Club Atlético Lanús
- (Nigeria) Abdulrazak Ekpoki - Signed From Gimnàstic de Tarragona
- (Slovakia) Marián Kelemen - Signed From CD Tenerife

Out:

- (Spain) Jon Urzelai - Transferred To SD Eibar
- (Spain) Iván Carril - Return To Deportivo de La Coruña
- (Philippines) Ángel Guirado - Return To Deportivo de La Coruña
- (Spain) Sergio Villanueva - Transferred To Real Oviedo
- (Spain) Roberto Alvarez - Transferred To Alicante CF
- (Spain) Jeffrey Martin - On Loan To UD Villa de Santa Brígida
- (Spain) Abraham - On Loan To CD Orientación Marítima
- (Spain) Iván Martín - On Loan To Universidad de Las Palmas CF
- (Spain) Jesús Abrante - On Loan To UD Fuerteventura

== Xerez CD ==
In:

- (Uruguay) Walter López - Signed From River Plate
- (Argentina) Gonzalo del Bono - On Loan From Atlético de Rafaela
- (Colombia) Abel Aguilar - On Loan From Udinese
- (Spain) Jorge Luque - Signed From Alicante
- (Spain) Chema - Signed From Alicante
- (Spain) Yordi - Signed From Mallorca
- (Spain) Marcos Navas - On Loan From Sevilla B
- (Spain) David Prieto - On Loan From Sevilla B

Out

- (Argentina) Gonzalo del Bono - Return To Atlético de Rafaela
- (Spain) García Granero - Transferred To UD Vecindario
- (Spain) Alex Fernández - Released
- (Spain) Selu - Transferred To Orihuela
- (Spain) Rubén Pazos - Transferred To Zamora CF
- (Spain) Alex Colorado - On Loan To Granada
- (Spain) Iván Rosado - Return To Osasuna
- (Spain) Alberto Soria - Transferred To Playas de Jandía
- (Spain) Guzmán Casaseca - On Loan To Córdoba
- (Spain) Tete - Transferred To Salamanca
- (Spain) Guille Escribano - Transferred To Ponferradina
- (Spain) Aurelio - Transferred To Castellón
- (Spain) Mikel Etxabe - Transferred To Eibar
- (Spain) Sergio Narvaez - On Loan To Ceuta
- (Argentina) Dani Pendín - Transferred To Castellón
