= Kirian Ledesma =

Spanish footballer

Personal information
- Full name: Kirian Rodríguez Ledesma
- Date of birth: 22 July 1984 (age 42)
- Place of birth: Candelaria, Spain
- Height: 1.79 m (5 ft 10 in)
- Position: Centre back

Youth career
- 1998–2004: Tenerife

Senior career*
Years	Team	Apps	(Gls)
2004–2006	Tenerife	53	(0)
2007	Vecindario	16	(1)
2007–2008	Ibiza-Eivissa	34	(0)
2009	FSV Frankfurt II	8	(1)
2009–2010	FSV Frankfurt	10	(0)
2012–2016	Laguna		
2016–2018	Orotava		
2018	Las Palmas Atlético		

International career
2000–2001	Spain U16	4	(0)
- * Club domestic league appearances and goals

Kirian Rodríguez Ledesma (born 22 July 1984), often known simply as Kirian, is a Spanish former footballer who played as a central defender.

== Football career ==
Born in Candelaria, Tenerife, Kirian began his career with CD Tenerife, making his professional debut in the second division and playing six matches in the 2003–04 season. He became a regular in the following years with the Canary Islands club in the same level, being definitely released in December 2006 and joining neighbouring UD Vecindario the following month.

Kirian moved to amateurs SE Eivissa-Ibiza in the summer of 2007, but left for Germany after one and a half seasons in division three, signing with FSV Frankfurt. On 11 May 2010, after appearing rarely for the second tier side, he was released from contract.
