= 2006–07 Segunda División =

76th season of the second-tier football league in Spain

Segunda División
- Season: 2006–07
- Champions: Real Valladolid
- Promoted: Real Valladolid; Almería; Real Murcia
- Relegated: RM Castilla; Ponferradina; Lorca Deportiva; Vecindario
- Matches: 462
- Goals: 1,131 (2.45 per match)
- Top goalscorer: (Spain) Marcos Márquez

The 2006–07 Segunda División season (known this season as the Liga BBVA for sponsorship reasons) was the 76th since its establishment. The first matches of the season were played on 27 August 2006, and the season ended on 17 June 2007. Alavés, Cádiz and Málaga were the teams which were relegated from La Liga the previous season. Las Palmas, Salamanca, Ponferradina, and Vecindario were the teams which were promoted from Segunda División B the previous season.

== Teams ==
Location of teams in Segunda División 2007–08

The 2006–07 Segunda División was made up of the following teams:

Team	Home city	Stadium	Capacity
Alavés	Vitoria-Gasteiz	Mendizorrotza	19,840
Albacete	Albacete	Carlos Belmonte	17,500
Almería	Almería	Juegos Mediterráneos	15,000
Cádiz	Cádiz	Ramón de Carranza	15,000
Castellón	Castellón	Nou Estadi Castàlia	14,485
Ciudad de Murcia	Murcia	La Condomina	17,000
Elche	Elche	Martínez Valero	36,017
Hércules	Alicante	José Rico Pérez	29,500
Las Palmas	Las Palmas de Gran Canaria	Gran Canaria	31,250
Lorca Deportiva	Lorca	Francisco Artés Carrasco	8,120
Málaga	Málaga	La Rosaleda	28,963
Numancia	Soria	Nuevo Los Pajaritos	9,800
Polideportivo Ejido	El Ejido	Santo Domingo	7,870
Ponferradina	Ponferrada	El Toralín	8,800
Real Madrid Castilla	Madrid	Alfredo Di Stéfano	6,000
Real Murcia	Murcia	Nueva Condomina	31,179
Salamanca	Villares de la Reina	El Helmántico	17,341
Sporting de Gijón	Gijón	El Molinón	25,885
Tenerife	Santa Cruz de Tenerife	Heliodoro Rodríguez López	22,824
Real Valladolid	Valladolid	José Zorrilla	27,846
Vecindario	Vecindario	Municipal	4,500
Xerez	Jerez de la Frontera	Chapín	20,523

== League table ==
Pos	Team	Pld	W	D	L	GF	GA	GD	Pts	Promotion or relegation
1	Valladolid (C, P)	42	26	10	6	70	35	+35	88	Promotion to La Liga
2	Almería (P)	42	24	8	10	73	49	+24	80	Promotion to La Liga
3	Murcia (P)	42	21	13	8	62	45	+17	76	Promotion to La Liga
4	Ciudad de Murcia	42	18	9	15	52	44	+8	63	
5	Cádiz	42	15	16	11	53	45	+8	61	
6	Albacete	42	16	12	14	49	48	+1	60 (Note: TEN 1–0 ALB; ALB 2–0 TEN)	
7	Tenerife	42	18	6	18	48	51	−3	60	
8	Numancia	42	15	13	14	48	44	+4	58 (Note: NUM: 14 pts; XER: 11 pts; ELC: 4 pts → EJI 2-1 ELC; EJI: 4 pts → ELC 2-0 PEJ)	
9	Xerez	42	16	10	16	47	42	+5	58	
10	Elche	42	16	10	16	47	46	+1	58	
11	Poli Ejido	42	16	10	16	52	50	+2	58	
12	Salamanca	42	15	12	15	53	50	+3	57	
13	Sporting Gijón	42	16	8	18	53	53	0	56 (Note: CAS 0–3 SPG; SPG 2–2 CAS)	
14	Castellón	42	15	11	16	48	41	+7	56	
15	Málaga	42	14	13	15	49	50	−1	55	
16	Hércules	42	14	12	16	48	52	−4	54	
17	Alavés	42	13	13	16	51	60	−9	52	
18	Las Palmas	42	13	12	17	51	59	−8	51	
19	Real Madrid Castilla (R)	42	13	10	19	55	67	−12	49	Relegation to Segunda División B
20	Ponferradina (R)	42	11	13	18	45	61	−16	46	Relegation to Segunda División B
21	Lorca Deportiva (R)	42	9	10	23	37	60	−23	37	Relegation to Segunda División B
22	Vecindario (R)	42	9	7	26	42	81	−39	34	Relegation to Segunda División B

Source: LFP - Liga Adelante
Rules for classification: 1st points; 2nd head-to-head points; 3rd head-to-head goal difference; 4th head-to-head goals scored; 5th goal difference; 6th number of goals scored; 7th Fair-play points
(C) Champions; (P) Promoted; (R) Relegated

== Results ==
Home \ Away	ALA	ALB	ALM	CÁD	CAS	CMU	ELC	HÉR	LPA	LOR	MÁL	MUR	NUM	PEJ	PON	RMC	SAL	SGI	TEN	VLD	VEC	XER
Alavés	—	1–1	1–0	1–1	2–0	1–0	1–1	2–3	1–2	3–1	0–1	1–1	2–2	2–1	1–2	3–1	0–2	0–0	0–0	1–2	5–1	1–0
Albacete	1–0	—	1–1	4–1	0–1	2–2	0–0	0–1	1–1	1–0	2–1	0–0	1–3	1–1	2–0	1–0	1–1	2–1	2–0	0–2	3–2	0–0
Almería	2–2	2–1	—	2–1	2–1	3–1	2–0	3–0	2–1	4–0	2–2	2–1	3–0	3–1	3–1	1–0	3–1	2–0	0–1	3–2	3–0	1–1
Cádiz	1–1	1–2	2–2	—	0–2	1–2	3–1	1–1	0–0	0–0	1–0	1–1	1–0	0–0	0–0	3–3	2–0	1–1	1–0	0–0	3–0	1–2
Castellón	2–0	0–0	1–1	2–0	—	2–0	1–2	0–0	2–0	2–1	0–1	0–1	3–1	0–0	4–0	1–1	1–2	0–3	2–1	2–1	0–0	1–0
Ciudad de Murcia	5–1	2–1	0–1	1–1	1–1	—	1–1	2–1	4–2	2–1	2–0	1–1	1–0	3–0	1–1	0–0	1–0	3–1	2–1	1–0	2–0	1–0
Elche	1–0	1–2	1–2	1–1	1–0	1–2	—	2–0	2–1	0–2	2–1	1–1	1–2	2–0	1–0	2–1	1–1	1–0	0–1	0–1	2–1	1–1
Hércules	3–1	0–1	0–2	0–1	2–2	1–1	0–2	—	1–1	1–1	0–1	0–1	2–0	1–0	3–0	0–3	2–0	1–1	3–1	2–2	1–0	2–0
Las Palmas	6–1	0–1	3–1	0–3	1–0	0–1	2–2	3–1	—	2–1	2–1	1–0	1–1	0–2	1–0	2–1	2–2	3–1	0–0	2–2	3–1	0–1
Lorca	1–2	3–0	3–1	1–2	0–4	1–0	2–0	0–1	0–1	—	2–2	1–1	1–1	1–3	1–0	2–0	0–2	0–2	2–3	0–2	1–1	2–1
Málaga	1–0	0–3	2–1	1–1	0–0	0–0	2–0	0–0	3–1	4–0	—	1–2	1–2	1–1	1–1	3–3	1–0	1–1	1–0	0–1	3–2	1–0
Murcia	1–0	0–1	3–2	1–0	2–1	2–1	0–2	3–1	3–1	1–0	3–2	—	3–0	0–1	1–1	2–2	1–0	3–1	1–4	1–4	4–3	3–0
Numancia	1–1	1–1	1–1	1–0	2–1	2–1	3–2	2–2	3–0	0–0	2–0	1–2	—	3–1	1–0	0–1	0–0	2–0	0–1	1–2	3–0	1–0
Polideportivo Ejido	5–2	1–0	1–2	0–1	0–2	2–0	2–1	2–0	1–1	1–1	4–1	0–2	0–0	—	1–1	0–0	1–0	4–1	4–2	2–3	1–0	0–2
Ponferradina	0–2	4–3	0–1	1–3	1–0	1–0	1–1	4–1	3–0	2–1	2–2	1–1	2–0	2–0	—	0–3	1–2	0–3	1–0	2–2	3–3	1–1
R. M. Castilla	1–1	2–1	3–1	0–1	1–1	2–1	0–2	0–3	0–3	2–0	2–1	0–2	0–0	4–1	3–1	—	2–1	0–3	2–3	1–3	3–2	1–1
Salamanca	3–0	4–1	2–0	2–0	1–2	1–0	0–1	2–2	2–2	2–1	0–0	3–2	0–0	0–0	3–3	3–2	—	0–1	0–0	1–1	2–3	1–0
Sporting de Gijón	1–1	0–1	1–2	5–4	2–2	4–3	0–0	1–0	2–0	0–1	1–3	0–1	1–0	0–1	1–0	0–1	2–1	—	1–1	1–3	1–0	2–1
Tenerife	1–0	1–2	2–1	0–1	2–0	1–0	2–0	3–2	3–1	1–1	1–2	1–1	1–0	3–1	0–1	3–2	1–0	0–4	—	0–2	0–2	0–2
Valladolid	1–0	4–2	2–2	2–2	1–0	1–0	1–0	0–1	2–0	1–0	1–0	1–1	2–0	0–1	1–0	4–0	2–3	1–0	1–0	—	3–0	1–1
Vecindario	0–1	1–0	0–1	1–2	4–2	0–1	1–4	1–1	1–0	1–1	1–1	1–1	1–5	0–4	1–0	2–1	0–3	0–2	2–1	1–2	—	2–1
Xerez	0–2	0–1	3–0	1–4	1–0	2–0	2–1	0–2	0–0	1–0	1–0	1–1	1–1	2–1	3–1	3–1	5–0	3–1	1–2	1–1	1–0	—

Source: BDFutbol
Legend: Blue = home team win; Yellow = draw; Red = away team win.

== Top goal scorers ==
Last updated June 17, 2007

Goalscorers	Goal	Team
(Spain) Marcos Márquez	20	Las Palmas
(Spain) Víctor	19	Real Valladolid
(Spain) Álvaro Negredo	18	Real Madrid Castilla
(Spain) Joseba Llorente	18	Real Valladolid
(Sweden) Henok Goitom	15	Ciudad de Murcia
(Spain) Braulio	14	Salamanca
(Uruguay) Iván Alonso	14	Real Murcia
(Spain) Xisco	13	Vecindario
(Argentina) Gastón Casas	12	Elche

== Teams by autonomous community ==
	Autonomous community	Number of teams	Teams
1	Andalusia	5	Almería, Cádiz, Málaga, Poli Ejido, Xerez
2	Castile and León	4	Numancia, Ponferradina, Salamanca, Valladolid
3	Canary Islands	3	Las Palmas, Tenerife, Vecindario
3	Region of Murcia	3	Ciudad de Murcia, Lorca, Murcia
3	Valencian Community	3	Castellón, Elche, Hércules
6	Asturias	1	Sporting de Gijón
6	Basque Country	1	Alavés
6	Castile-La Mancha	1	Albacete
6	Madrid	1	Real Madrid Castilla

== See also ==
- List of transfers of Segunda División – 2006–07 season
