= UD Ibiza-Eivissa =

Ibiza-Eivissa
- Full name: Unión Deportiva Ibiza-Eivissa
- Founded: 1995
- Dissolved: 2010
- Ground: Can Misses, Ibiza Town, Balearic Islands, Spain
- Capacity: 10,000
Home colours	Away colours

Unión Deportiva Ibiza-Eivissa was a Spanish football team based in Ibiza Town, in the autonomous community of the Balearic Islands. Founded in 1995, it last played in Regional de Ibiza, holding home matches at Estadi Municipal de Can Misses, with a capacity of 10,000 seats.

== History ==
Unión Deportiva Ibiza-Eivissa was founded in 1995, after merging with another club in the area, Sociedad Deportiva Ibiza, which folded two years after. Subsequently, the team was renamed Club Esportiu Eivissa, going on to spend nine consecutive seasons in the fourth division, and experiencing another name change in 2001.

On 4 August 2009, Eivissa suffered two consecutive relegations, after having competed for the first time in Segunda División B (2007–09), being demoted to the regional leagues. In October, the club was acquired by an Italian group.

In mid-May 2010, Ibiza-Eivissa was liquidated by the management board due to a €1.000.000 debt. At the time, the club did not have a chairman or a board of directors.

=== Club background ===
- Sociedad Deportiva Ibiza (1956–97)
- Unión Deportiva Ibiza (1995–97)
- Club Esportiu Eivissa (1997–2001)
- Sociedad Deportiva Eivissa (2001–07)
- Societat Esportiva Eivissa-Ibiza (2007–09)
- Unión Deportiva Ibiza-Eivissa (2009–10)
- Unión Deportiva Ibiza (2015–)

== Season to season ==
Season	Tier	Division	Place	Copa del Rey
1996–97	5	Reg. Pref.	1st	
1997–98	5	Reg. Pref.	1st	
1998–99	4	3ª	15th	
1999–2000	4	3ª	15th	
2000–01	4	3ª	15th	
2001–02	4	3ª	15th	
2002–03	4	3ª	5th	
2003–04	4	3ª	5th	

Season	Tier	Division	Place	Copa del Rey
2004–05	4	3ª	7th	
2005–06	4	3ª	5th	
2006–07	4	3ª	1st	
2007–08	3	2ª B	7th	
2008–09	3	2ª B	18th	
2009–10	5	Reg. Pref.	4th	

- 2 seasons in Segunda División B
- 8 seasons in Tercera División
- 4 seasons in Regional Preferente

== Famous players ==
- (Spain) Jonan García
- (Spain) Kirian Ledesma
- (Spain) Javi Moreno
- (Andorra) Josep Antoni Gomes

== Club anthem ==
(Crit de: "UC!")

Eivissa!, Eivissa!, Eivissa!

Quan s'Eivissa surt as camp
tot s'estadi es torna un clam
endavant vermell i blanc
s'afició amb valtros està.

Com corsaris mos farem
en es camp, hi lluitarem
amb honor i lleialtat
visca sa nostra ciutat!

Port s'Eivissa dins es cor
port s'Eivissa a sa sang
a l'Eivissa, es meu Eivissa,
mai el podré oblidar.

Eivissa!, Eivissa!, Eivissa!

Sigues ràpid com es vent
lluita fort sempre valent
esportiu i combatant
fes des joc un sentiment.

Porta alt es nostro nom
que s'escolti amb gran ressò
dus es nom de sa ciutat
força Eivissa, hem de guanyar!

Port s'Eivissa dins es cor
port s'Eivissa a sa sang
a s'Eivissa, es meu Eivissa
mai el podré jo oblidar.

Eivissa!, Eivissa!, Eivissa!

== See also ==
- SE Eivissa-Ibiza B
