= Estadio Municipal de Vecindario =

Municipal de Vecindario
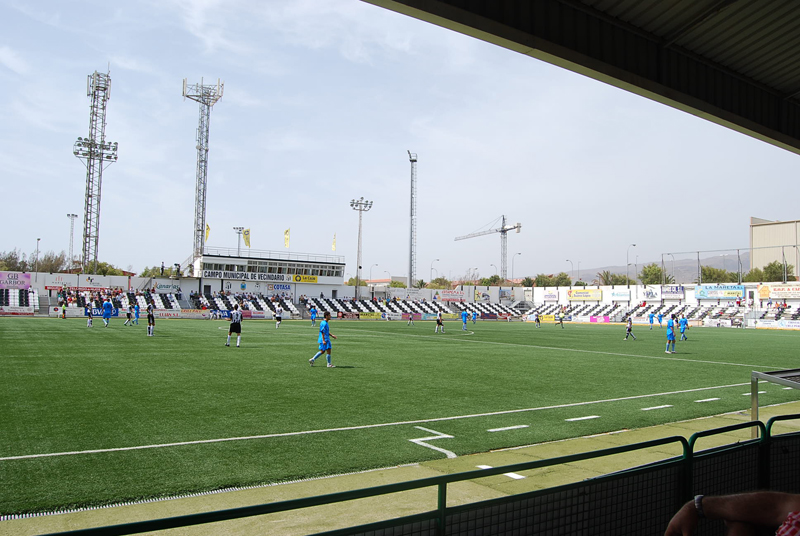
- Interactive map of Municipal de Vecindario
- Full name: Estadio Municipal de Vecindario
- Location: Santa Lucía de Tirajana, Spain
- Coordinates: 27°50′53.19″N 15°26′53.30″W
- Capacity: 4,500
- Surface: Artificial turf
- Field size: 101 m × 64 m (331 ft × 210 ft)

Tenant
- UD Vecindario (until 2015)

Estadio Municipal de Vecindario is a multi-use stadium in Santa Lucía de Tirajana, Spain. It is currently used mostly for football matches and is the home ground of UD Vecindario. The stadium holds 4,500 people. The pitch size is 101x64m.

In 2006, with the promotion of Vecindario to Segunda División, the stadium became the first one with artificial turf in the Spanish professional football.
