= UD Vecindario =

Vecindario
- Full name: Unión Deportiva Vecindario
- Founded: 1962; 2021 (refounded)
- Ground: Estadio Municipal; Vecindario, Canary Islands, Spain
- Capacity: 4,500
- President: Rubén Rivero Peña
- Manager: Ángel Alonso
- League: Interinsular Preferente
- 2024–25: Interinsular Preferente, 12th of 22
Home colours	Away colours

Unión Deportiva Vecindario is a Spanish football team based in Vecindario, Santa Lucía de Tirajana, Gran Canaria, in the autonomous community of Canary Islands. Founded in 1962 and refounded in 2021, they play in Interinsular Preferente, holding home games at Estadio Municipal de Vecindario, with a capacity of 4,500 people.

== History ==
Unión Deportiva Vecindario was founded in 1962. After decades in the fourth division, it first reached the third exactly in the year 2000, being again relegated two years after.

In 2006–07 the club first appeared in the second level, but only lasted that season, ranking eventually last.

On 11 August 2015, the president of UD Vecindario announced the dissolution of the club. On 6 May 2021, the club was refounded as Club Desportivo Paseo Comercial de Vecindario, after Vecinklubf (founded in 2013) reached an agreement with Vecindario to use the sporting name and the colours of Vecindario.

== Season to season ==
Season	Tier	Division	Place	Copa del Rey
1968–69	6	3ª Reg.	2nd	
1969–70	6	3ª Reg.	6th	
1970–71	6	3ª Reg.	4th	
1971–72	6	3ª Reg.	6th	
1972–73	6	3ª Reg.	9th	
1973–74	6	3ª Reg.	3rd	
1974–75	5	2ª Reg.	15th	
1975–76	6	3ª Reg.	11th	
1976–77	6	3ª Reg.	5th	
1977–78	7	3ª Reg.	7th	
1978–79	7	2ª Reg.	9th	
1979–80	7	2ª Reg.	9th	
1980–81	7	2ª Reg.	2nd	
1981–82	6	1ª Reg.	10th	
1982–83	6	1ª Reg.	5th	
1983–84	5	Reg. Pref.	5th	
1984–85	5	Reg. Pref.	12th	
1985–86	5	Reg. Pref.	12th	
1986–87	5	Reg. Pref.	17th	
1987–88	6	1ª Reg.	1st	

Season	Tier	Division	Place	Copa del Rey
1988–89	5	Int. Pref.	1st	
1989–90	4	3ª	7th	
1990–91	4	3ª	10th	Second round
1991–92	4	3ª	15th	
1992–93	4	3ª	13th	
1993–94	4	3ª	13th	
1994–95	4	3ª	5th	
1995–96	4	3ª	11th	
1996–97	4	3ª	6th	
1997–98	4	3ª	10th	
1998–99	4	3ª	9th	
1999–2000	4	3ª	3rd	
2000–01	3	2ª B	8th	
2001–02	3	2ª B	18th	Round of 32
2002–03	4	3ª	1st	
2003–04	3	2ª B	5th	Round of 64
2004–05	3	2ª B	12th	Round of 64
2005–06	3	2ª B	4th	
2006–07	2	2ª	22nd	Second round
2007–08	3	2ª B	11th	Second round

Season	Tier	Division	Place	Copa del Rey
2008–09	3	2ª B	11th	
2009–10	3	2ª B	11th	
2010–11	3	2ª B	10th	
2011–12	3	2ª B	19th	First round
2012–13	4	3ª	7th	
2013–14	4	3ª	20th	
2014–15	5	Int. Pref.	13th	

- 1 season in Segunda División
- 10 seasons in Segunda División B
- 14 seasons in Tercera División

=== Club refounded ===
Season	Tier	Division	Place	Copa del Rey
2021–22	6	Int. Pref.	10th	
2022–23	6	Int. Pref.	11th	
2023–24	7	1ª Reg.	1st	
2024–25	6	Int. Pref.	12th	
2025–26	6	Int. Pref.		

== Former players ==
- Mauro Icardi (youth teams only) (2002-08)
- Xisco Jiménez (on loan from Deportivo de La Coruña) (2006-07).
- Juan Arostegui (2007-08)
- Markel Bergara (on loan from Real Sociedad B) (2006-07)
- Álex Cruz (2008-09)
- David García Santana (2001-02, 2002-03 on loan from UD Las Palmas)
