= Santa Lucía de Tirajana =

Municipality in Gran Canaria, Spain

- Municipality
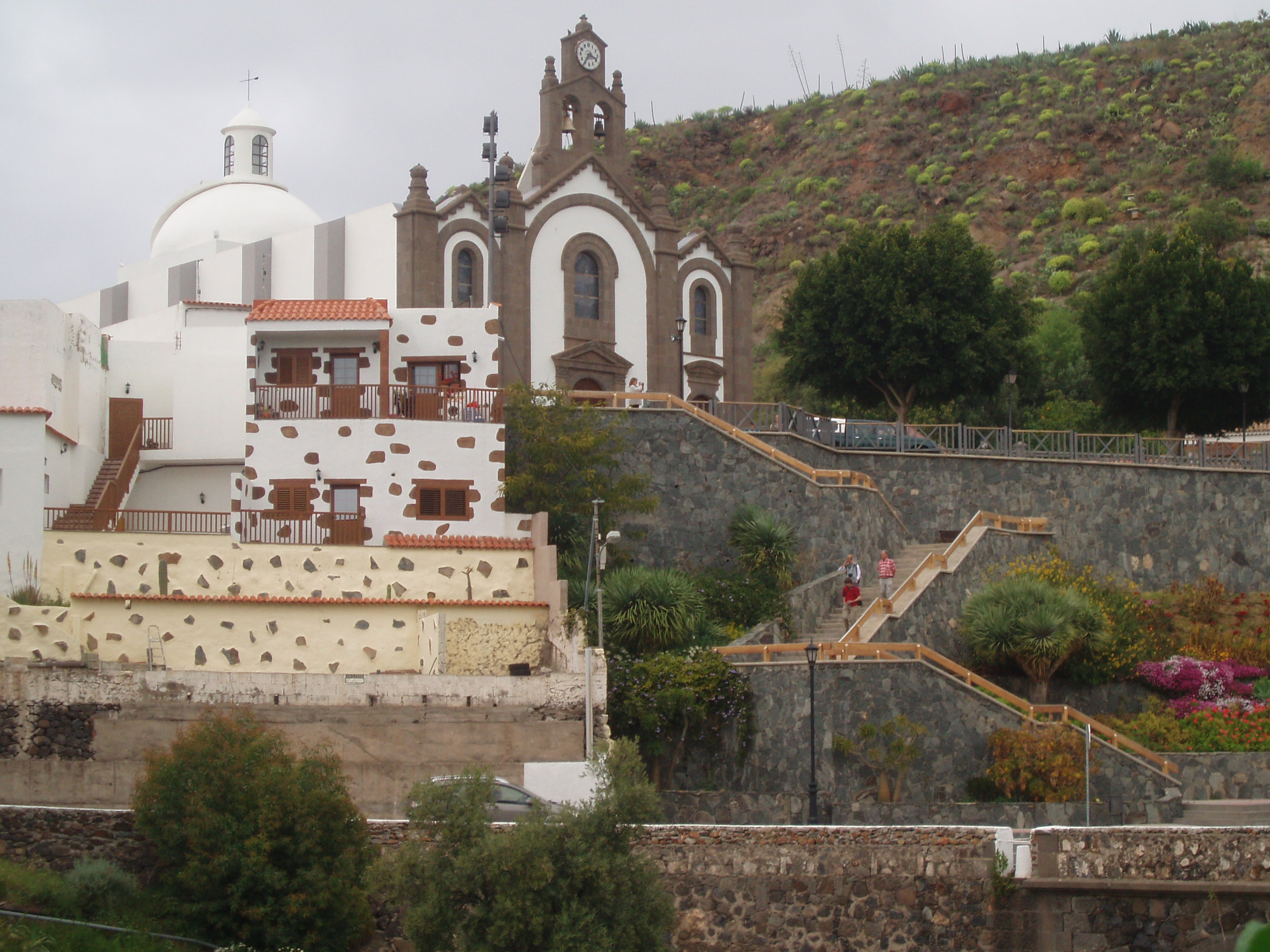
- Santa Lucía church

- Flag Coat of arms

- Municipal location in Gran Canaria

- Location in the province of Las Palmas Santa Lucía de Tirajana (Canary Islands) Santa Lucía de Tirajana (Spain, Canary Islands)
- Coordinates: 27°54′44″N 15°32′27″W
- Country: Spain
- Region: Macaronesia
- Autonomous Community: Canary Islands
- Province: Las Palmas
- Island: Gran Canaria

Government
  - Mayor: Dunia González Vega (NC)

Area
  - Total: 61.56 km^{2} (23.77 sq mi)
- Elevation (AMSL): 680 m (2,230 ft)

Population (2025-01-01)
  - Total: 78,584
  - Density: 1,277/km^{2} (3,306/sq mi)
- Time zone: UTC+0 (WET)
  - Summer (DST): UTC+1 (WEST (GMT +1))
- Postal code: 35110
- Area code: +34 (Spain) + 928 (Las Palmas)
- Website: santaluciagc.com

Santa Lucía de Tirajana is a town and a Spanish municipality in the south-eastern part of the island of Gran Canaria, in the Province of Las Palmas, in the Canary Islands.

== Geography ==
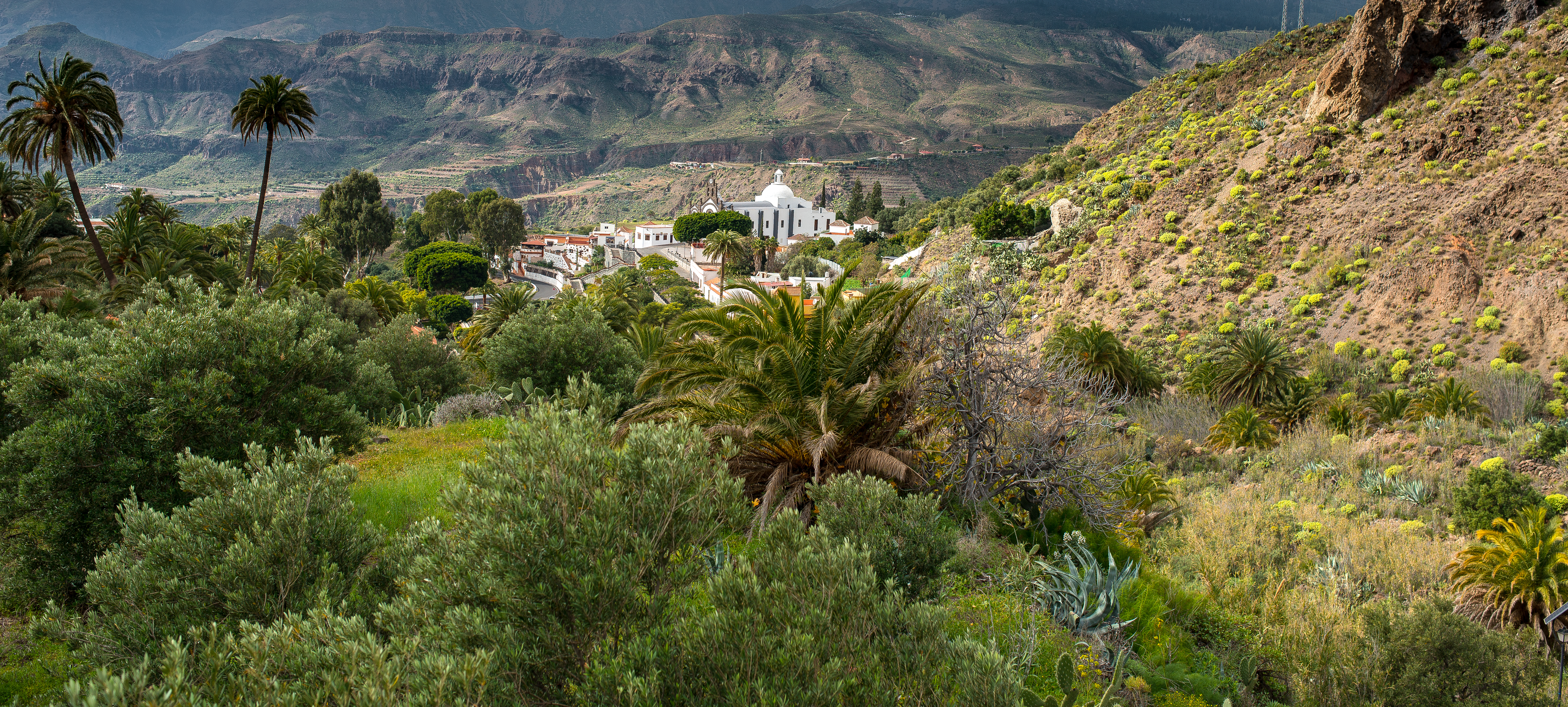

The town of Santa Lucía de Tirajana is situated in the mountains, 27 km (17 mi) south-west of Las Palmas. Its population is 68,506 (2013), and the area is 61.56 km^{2} (23.77 sq mi). The municipality includes the larger towns Cruce de Sardina, El Doctoral and Vecindario, located near the coast.

The Autopista GC-1 passes through the south-eastern part of the municipality.

== Population ==
Historical population

Year	Pop.	±%
1991	33,059	—
1996	40,127	+21.4%
2001	47,652	+18.8%
2002	49,902	+4.7%

Year	Pop.	±%
2003	52,684	+5.6%
2004	53,820	+2.2%
2013	68,506	+27.3%
2026	79,522	+16.1%

== Heritage sites ==
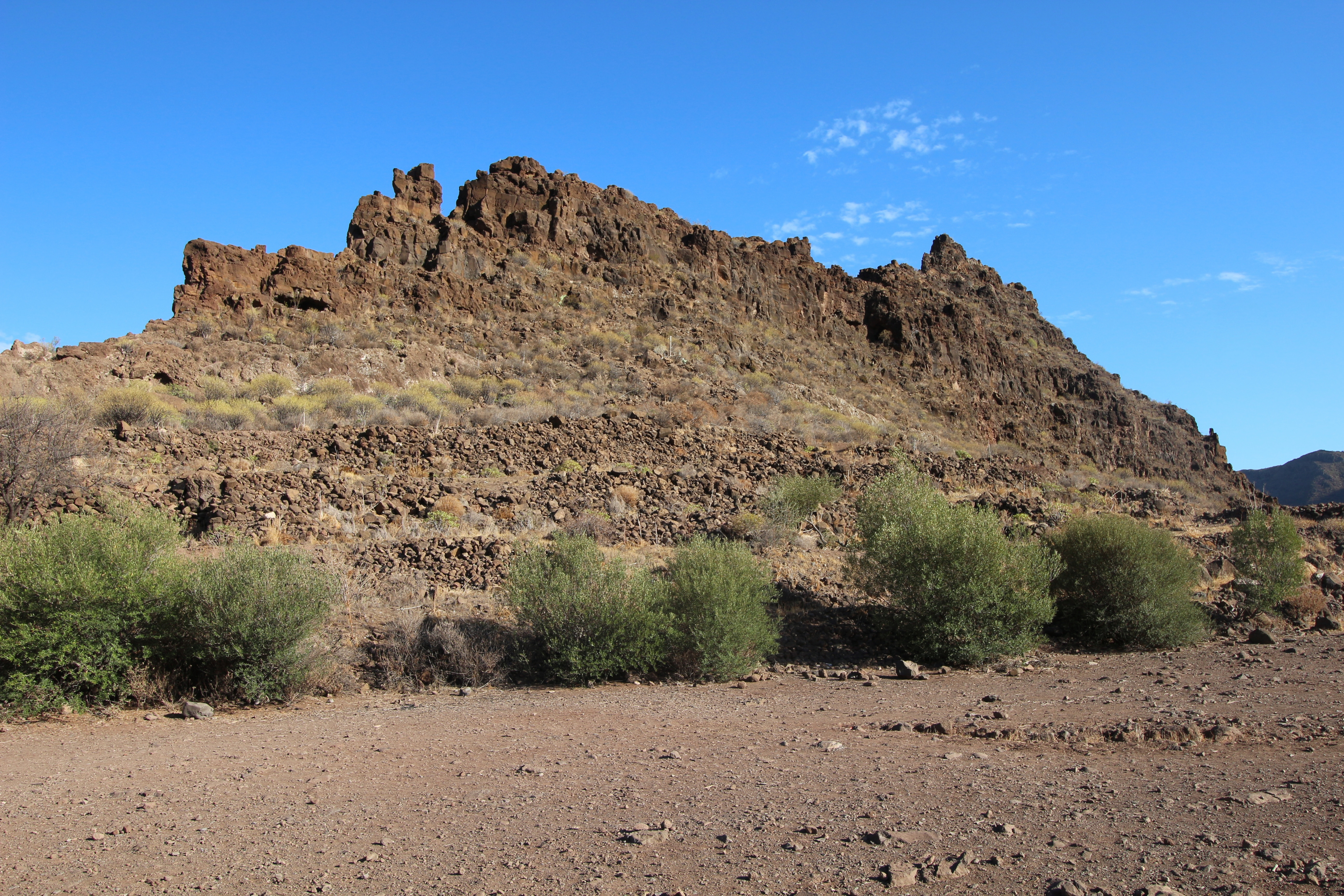
La Fortaleza

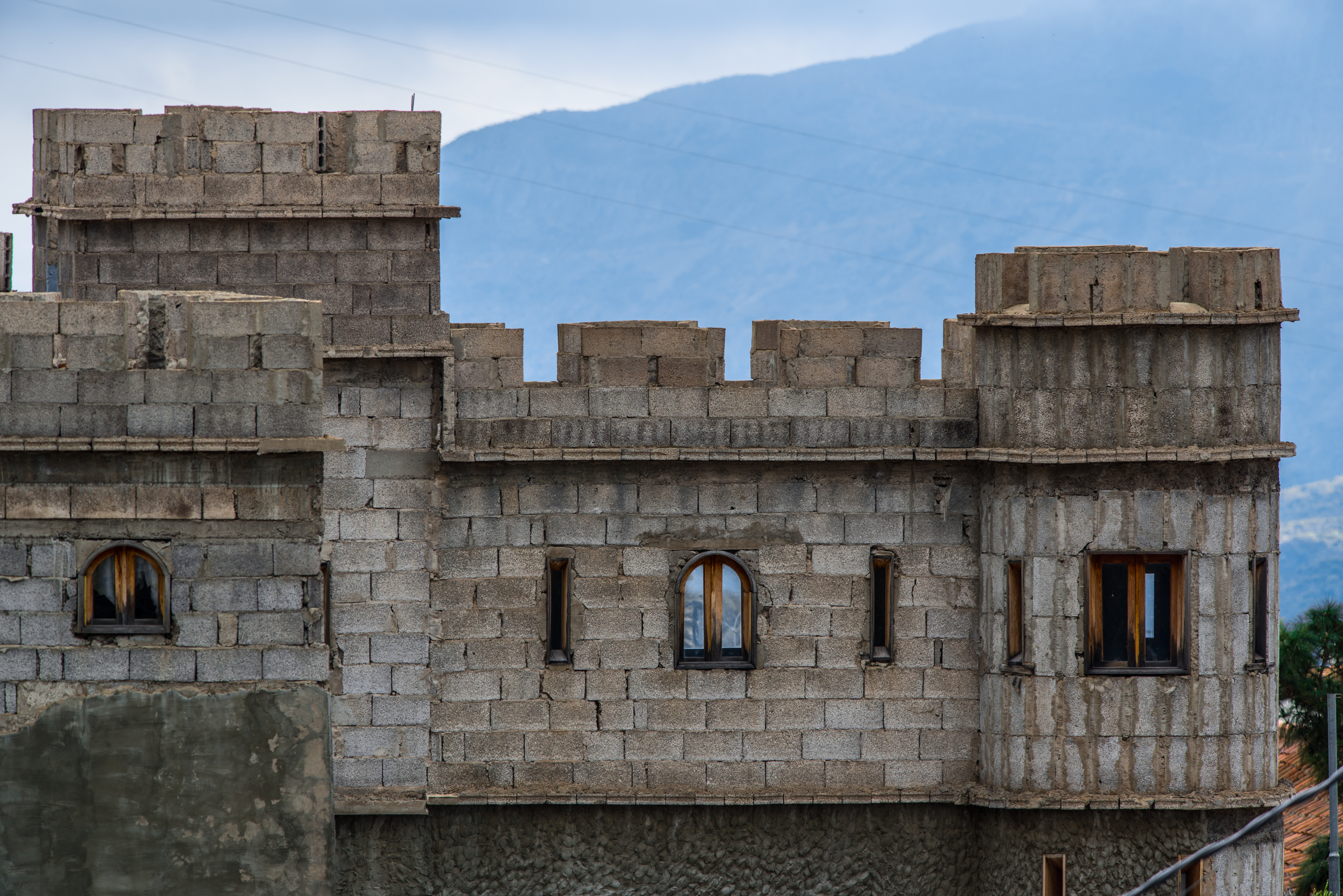

The archaeological site La Fortaleza is listed as a Property of cultural interest.

There are nine water mills dating from the 19th century, built on the Riego de la Zarcilla river. Most of them kept working up to the 1970s. Since then, many fell into disrepair. Ownership may be public or private. On the municipality, the two mills of El Valle (olive oil for one and gofio (Note: Gofio is roasted maize meal often stirred into coffee.) for the other) were declared properties of cultural interest in 2003. D. Benjamín González Araña, who owns the olive oil mill, had its restoration completed in 2004. The council of Gran Canaria had the gofio mill repaired in 2003.

== See also ==
- List of municipalities in Las Palmas
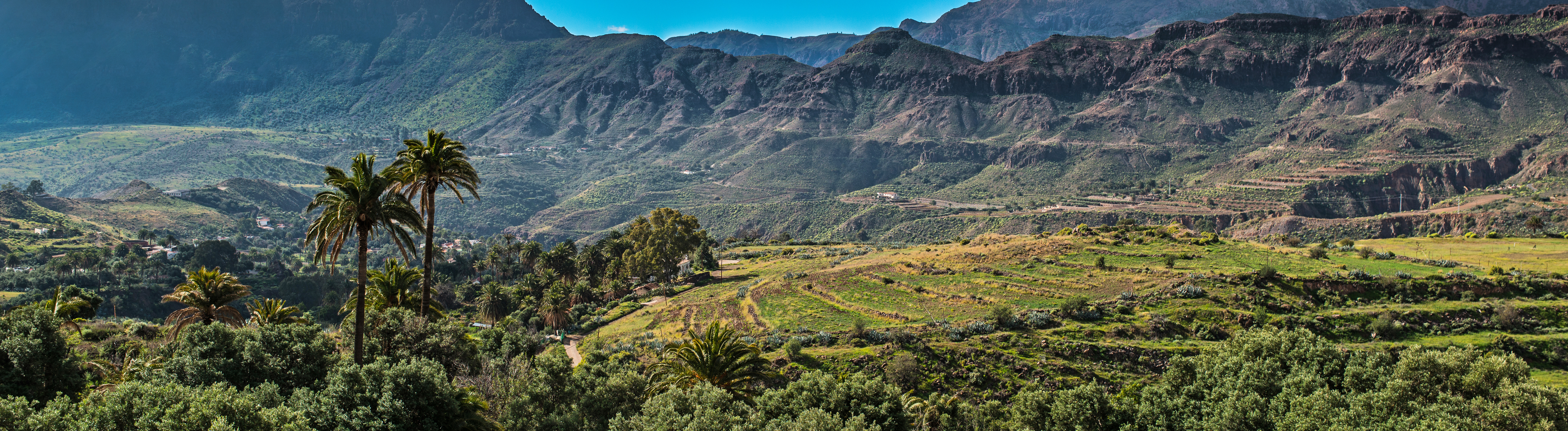

== Gallery ==
=== Iglesia Santa Lucía de Tirajana ===
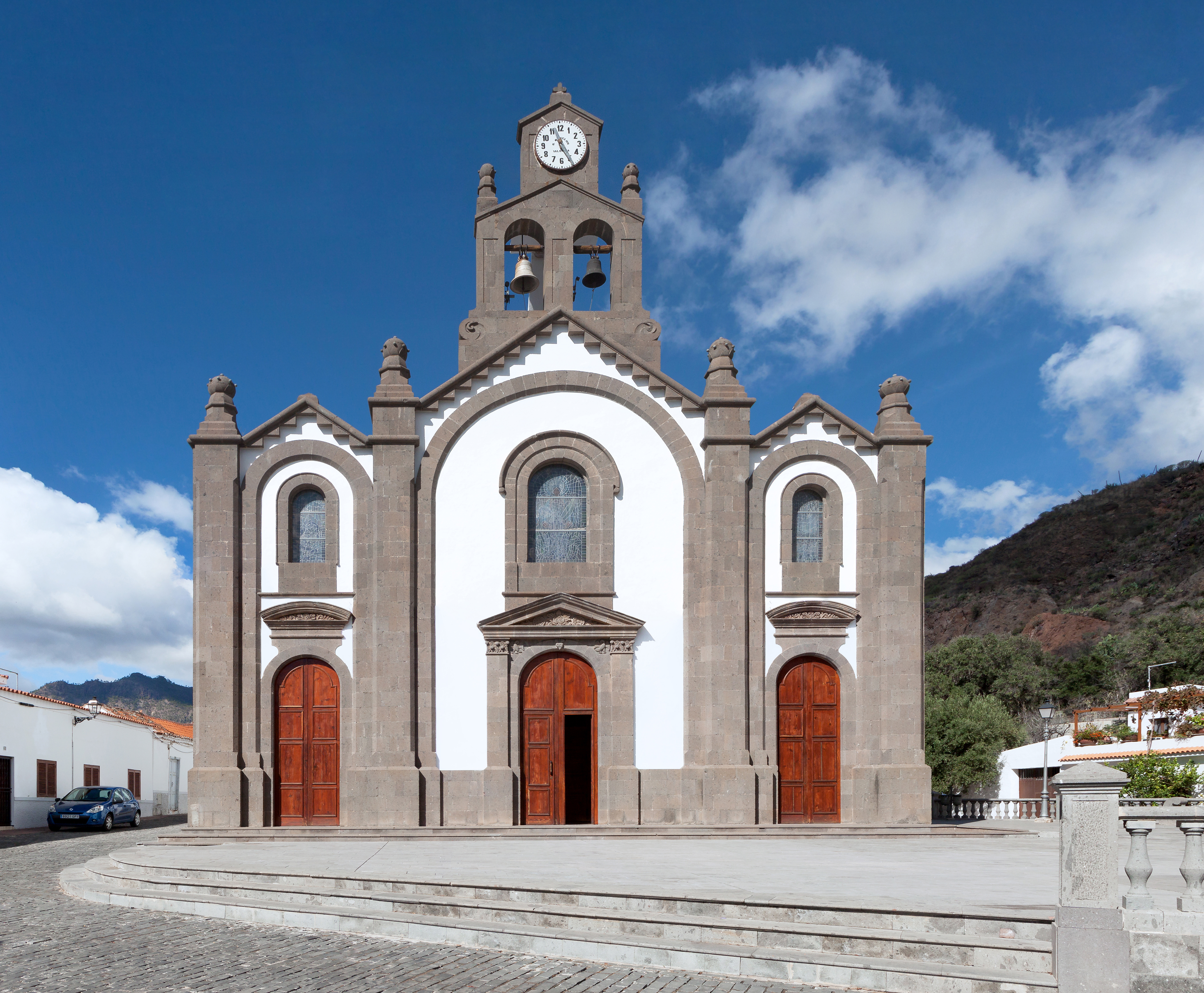

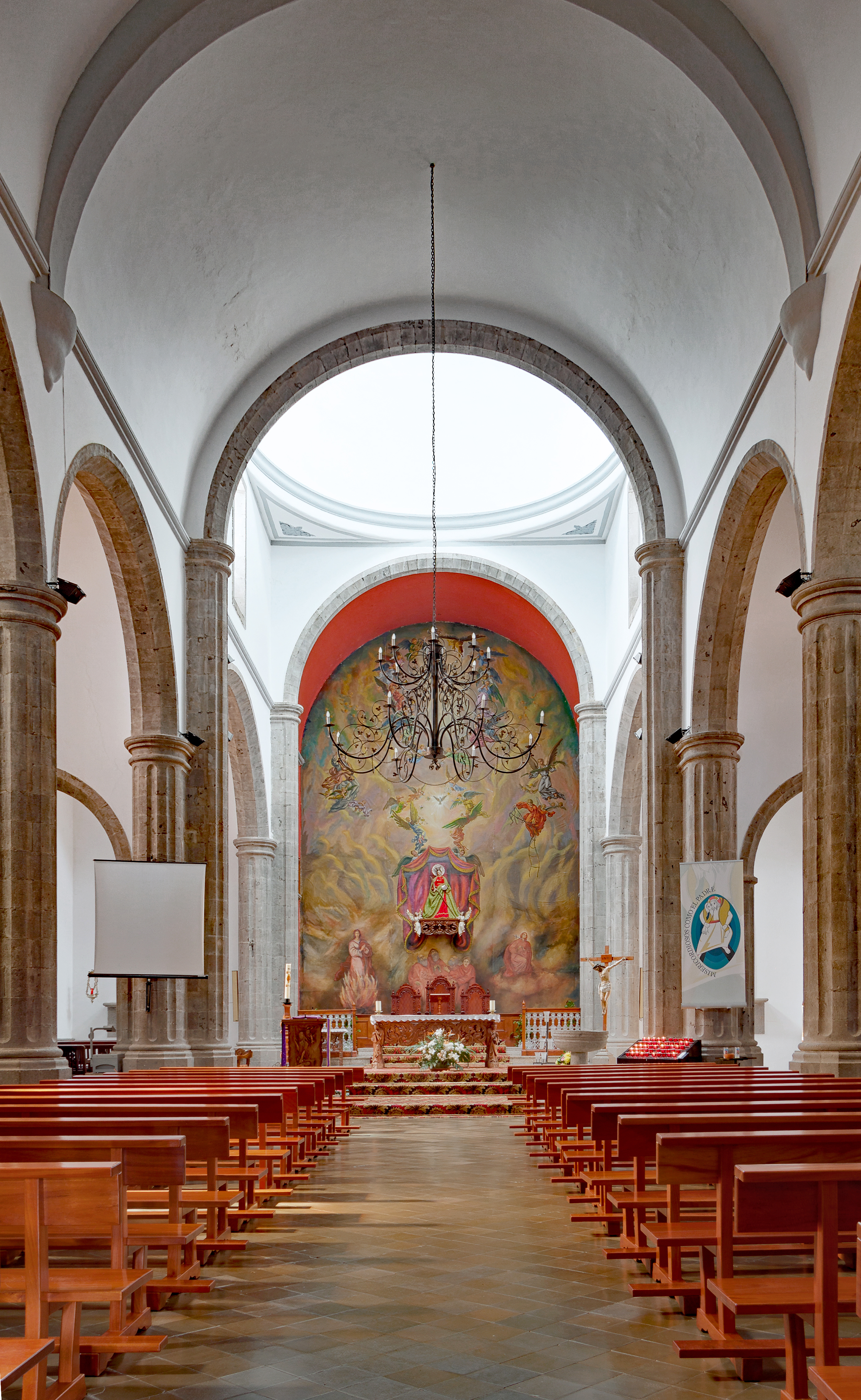

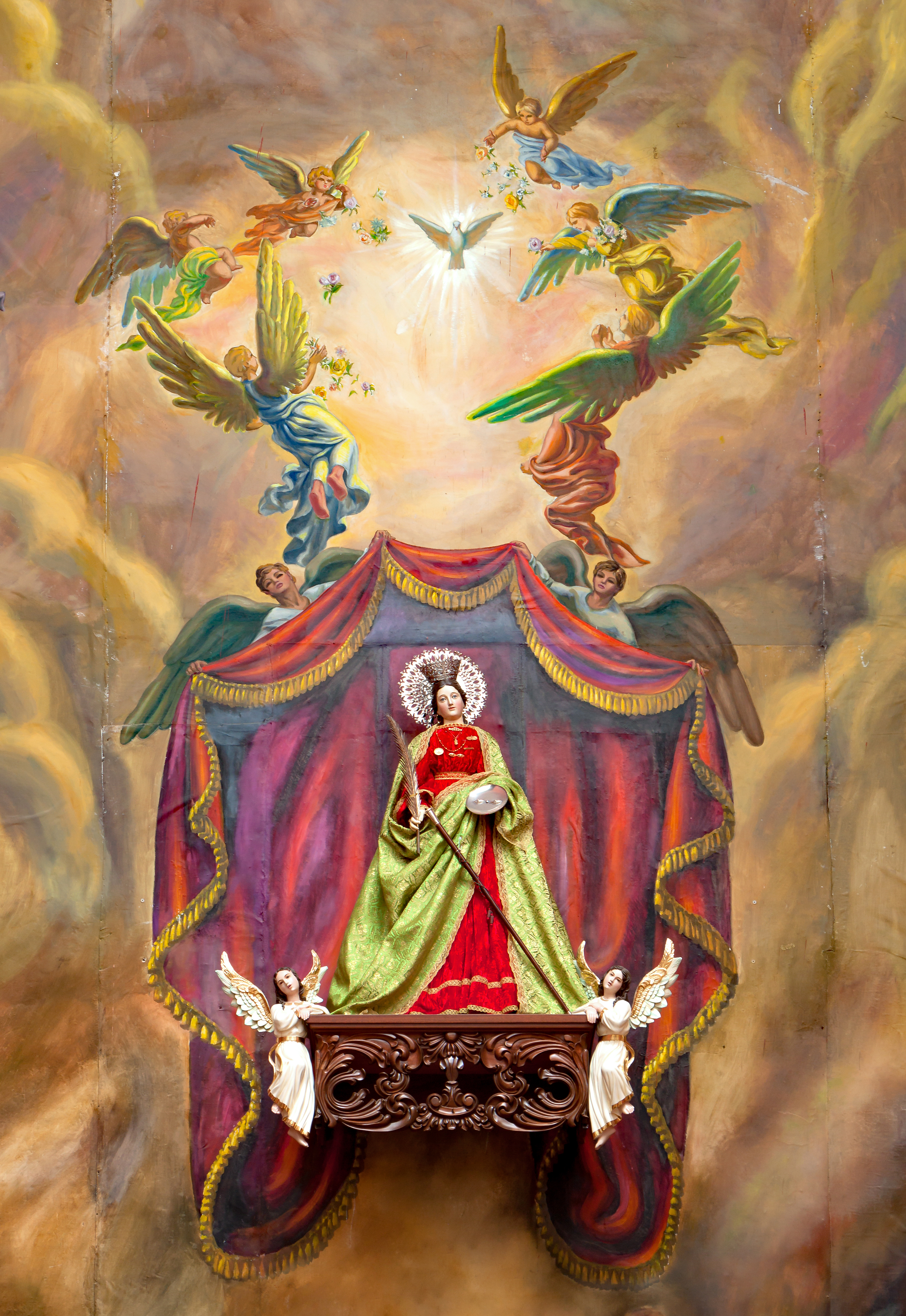

=== Public art ===
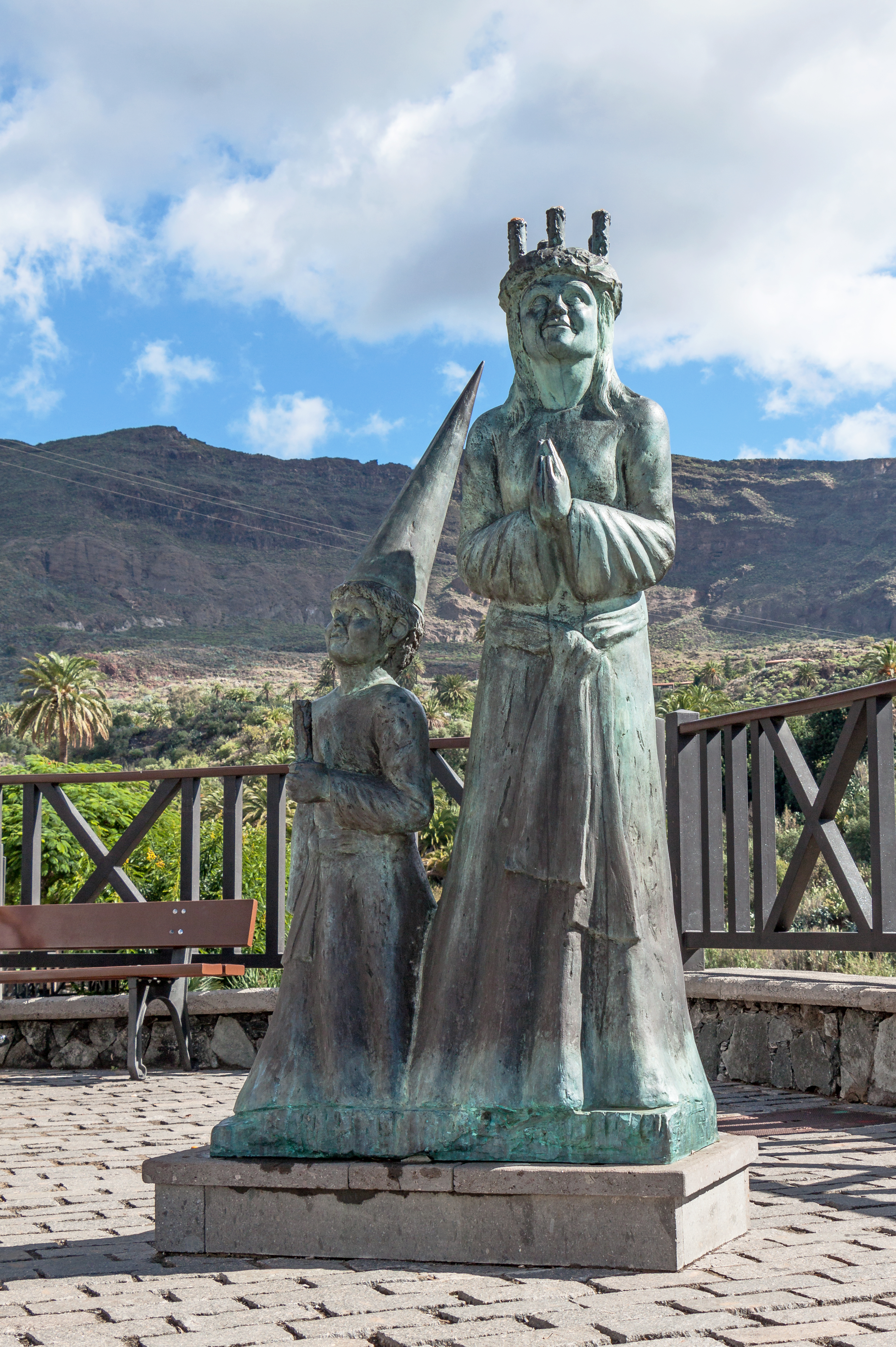
Lucy and Star Boy

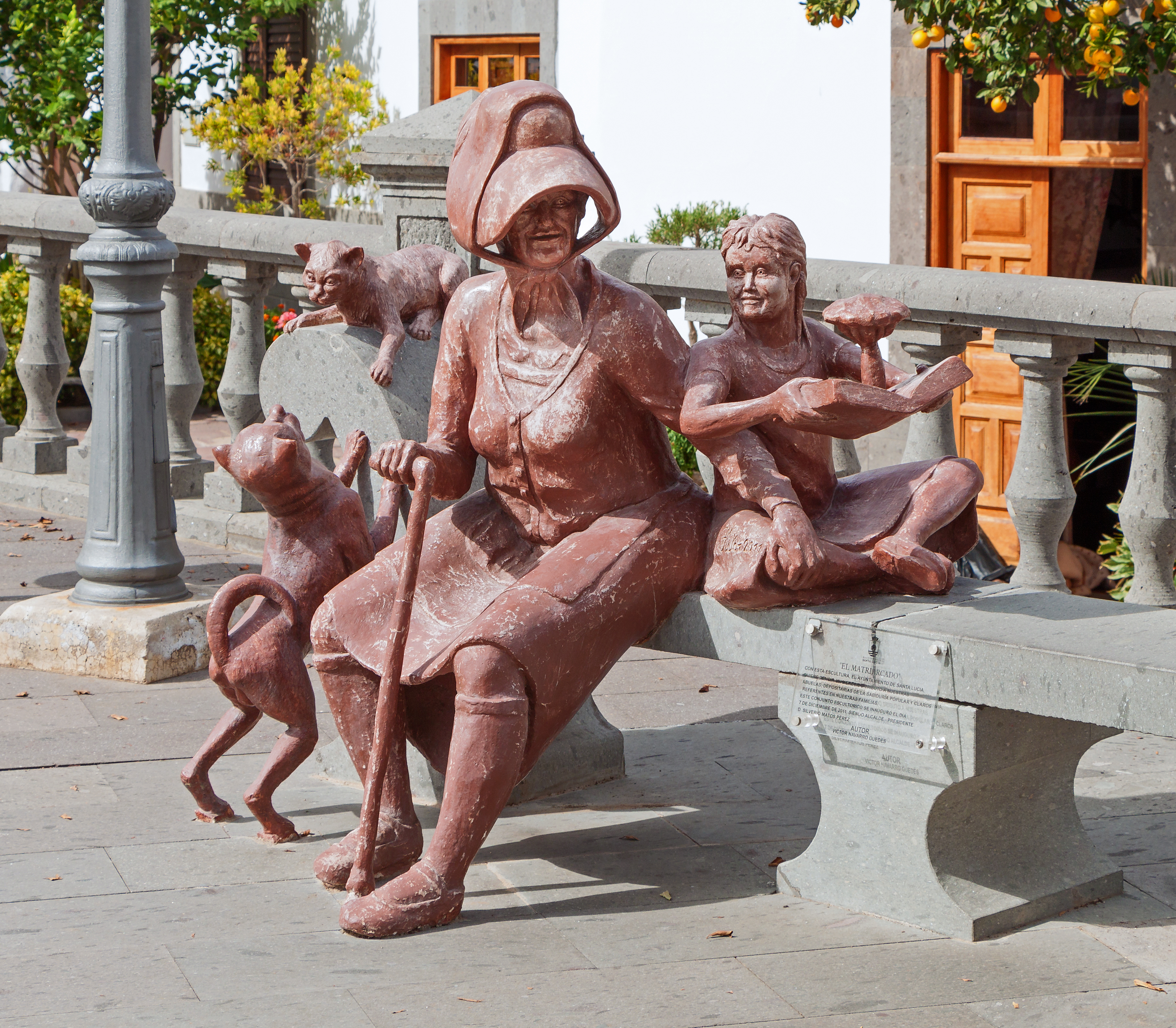
El Matriarcado

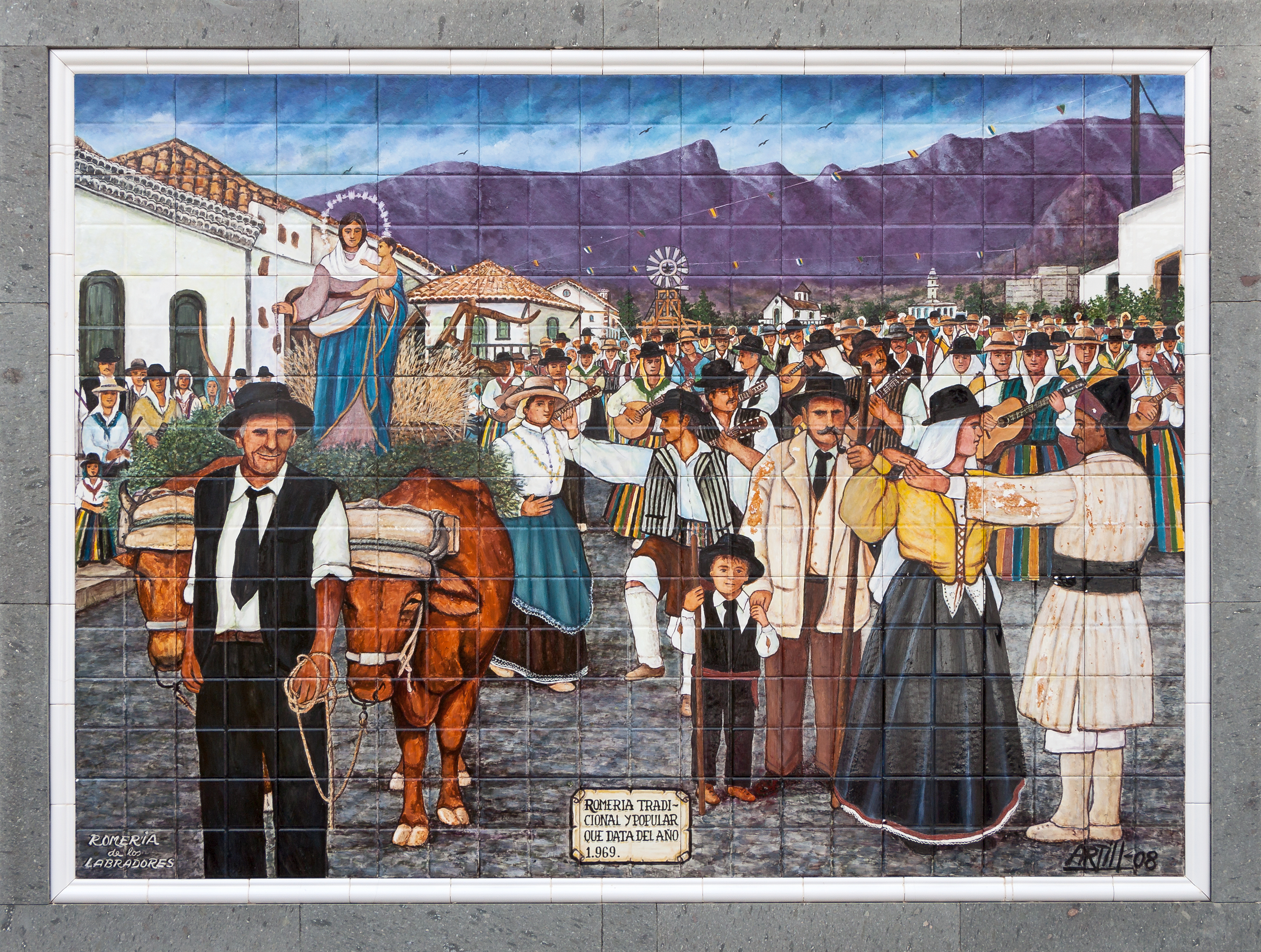
Romeria de los Labradores

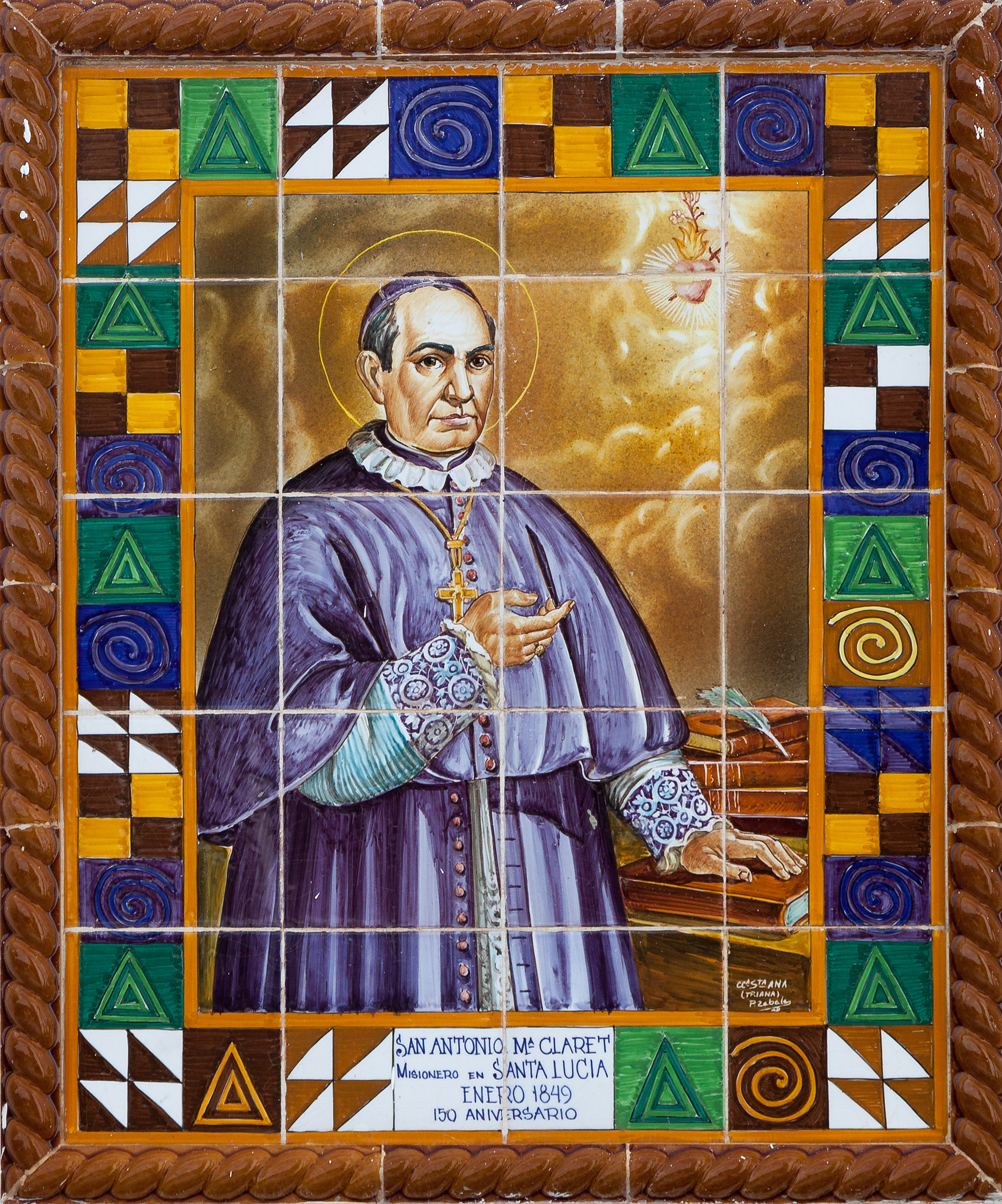
Saint Anthony Mary Claret
