= Vecindario =

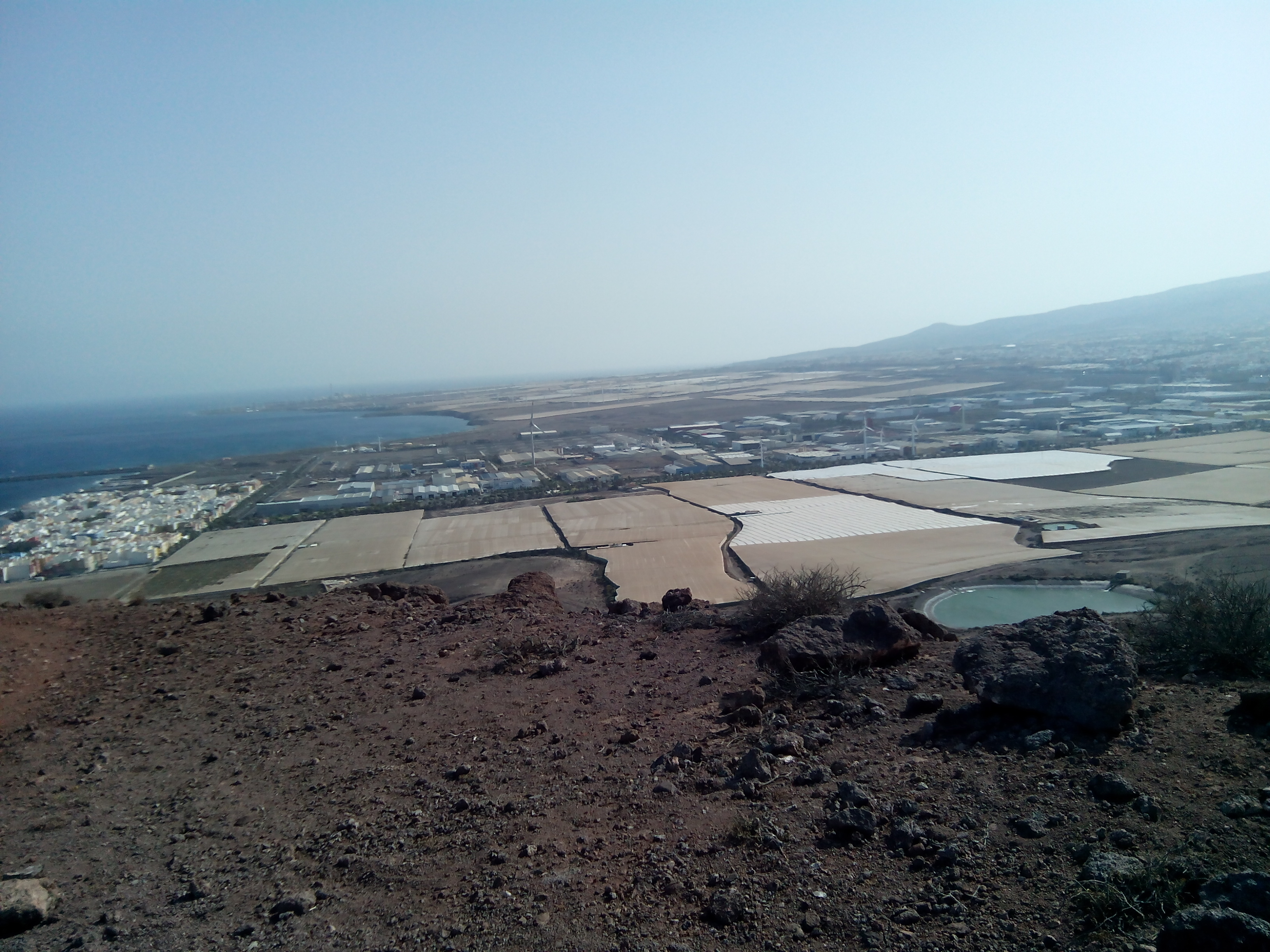

- Flag Coat of arms

- Location in the Canary Islands
- Coordinates: 27°50′50″N 15°26′35″W
- Country: Spain
- Region: Macaronesia
- Autonomous Community: Canary Islands
- Province: Las Palmas
- Island: Gran Canaria

Area
  - Total: 61.56 km^{2} (23.77 sq mi)

Population (2023)
  - Total: 80,235
  - Density: 1,303/km^{2} (3,376/sq mi)
- Time zone: UTC+0 (WET)
  - Summer (DST): UTC+1 (WEST)
- Postal code: 35110
- Area code: +34 (Spain) + 928 (Las Palmas)

Vecindario is a town in the municipality of Santa Lucía de Tirajana in the south-eastern part of the island of Gran Canaria, in the Province of Las Palmas, in the Canary Islands. The population of Vecindario was estimated at 80 235 inhabitants in the 2023 census. Its current president is D. Francisco José García López.

Vecindario is located in the coastal area of the municipality of Santa Lucia de Tirajana being the 3rd in population of the island and the 5th of the archipelago. Its population centres are El Doctoral, San Pedro Mártir, La Paredilla, La Cerruda, Hoya Pavón, San Rafael, El Canario, Casa Pastores, Cruce de Sardina, Sardina, La Vereda, Los Llanos and Balos. Vecindario has an estimated population of almost 80 235 inhabitants. It is located about 35 km from Las Palmas de Gran Canaria, the capital of the island, 15 km from the airport of Gran Canaria and another 15 km from Maspalomas, the main tourist area of the island.

Vecindario is the nerve centre of the south-eastern conurbation of Gran Canaria, consisting mainly of the coastal neighbourhoods of the municipalities of Santa Lucía de Tirajana, Agüimes and Ingenio, which are all on the island of Gran Canaria. Other towns in this conurbation, which has around 120,000 inhabitants, are Cruce de Arinaga, Playa de Arinaga (Agüimes) and Carrizal (Ingenio).

Agriculture was the main economic activity of Vecindario until the last quarter of the twentieth century for the production of tomatoes and other vegetables for export, when the service sector (especially trade) became predominant. At present, Vecindario is the largest urban open-air shopping centre on the island of Gran Canaria, together with the C.C. Atlántico and others of lesser importance such as C.C. Mercacentro, C.C. La Ciel and C.C. Avenida.

== History ==
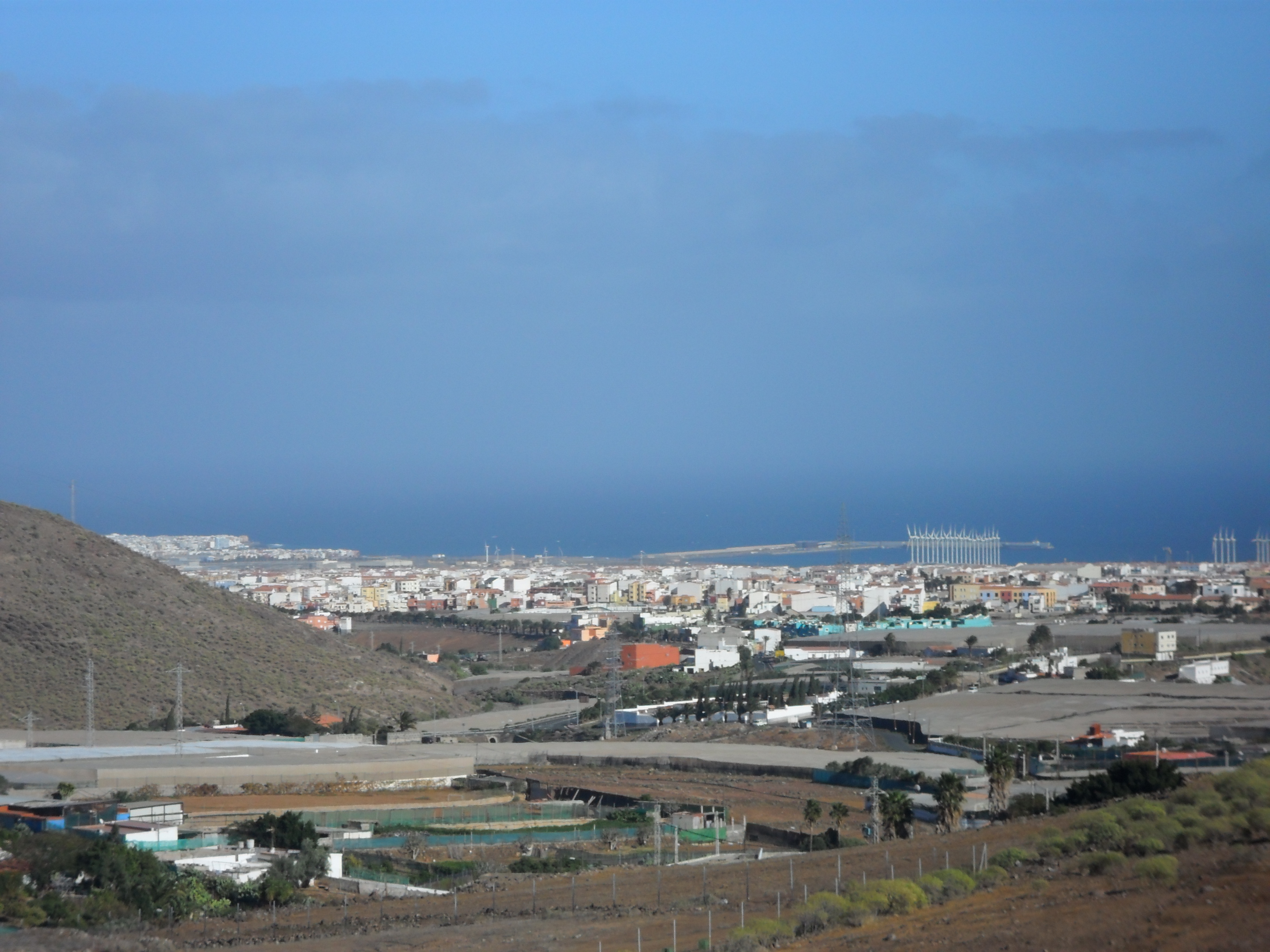
Vecindario

Vecindario was born as a result of the Agüimes mutiny, a consequence of the lawsuit between the residents of Agüimes and the Count of the Vega Grande over the ownership of the lands of the Llanos that they had plundered clandestinely. The Count claimed his property, alleging that he had bought it from its rightful owner. The neighbors of Agüimes, which belonged at that time to the Bishopric, were defended by Dr. Mendoza, a canon expert in law. It is precisely in this lawsuit that the name Vecindario ("the neighborhood's land") is used for the first time, in reference to the neighbors of Agüimes.

Dr. Mendoza demonstrated the falsity of the sale to the Count of the lands, which were of real ownership and had been granted to the neighbors in property by the payment of the pertinent taxes. Still in 1735, the neighbors had not paid Doctoral Mendoza for his defense in the lawsuit, so they proceeded to segregate a part of the lands of Vecindario as payment: it is in this area, later known as El Doctoral, where the house of La Pinta was built. Mendoza stipulated that a part of what was produced on a plot of land segregated for this purpose would be destined to the aid of the Holy House of Jerusalem, taking this place from then on the name of the Holy House.

In 1815 the coastal area (today's Vecindario and Sardina, until then part of Agüimes) and inland lands belonging to San Bartolomé de Tirajana were united to create the new municipality of Santa Lucía de Tirajana.

== Climate ==
The city has a warm arid BWh/dry subtropical climate according to the Köppen climate classification, influenced by the trade winds, although these are drier the further south, in addition to becoming quite intense. Winters usually average around 19 degrees Celsius and in summer about 25 degrees. In summer, temperatures are influenced by the proximity to the sea and the trade winds, although this does not save it from suffering episodes of intense heat, although always less than in the midlands. Regarding rainfall, it is very scarce, rarely reaching 100 mm in a humid year, although it is irregular, a general characteristic of the Canarian climate.

== Topography ==
The topography of Vecindario is generally flat, since it is located on a sedimentary ramp formed approximately 15,000 years ago by the erosion of the Caldera del Tirajana area. To the southwest you can see the Amurga Massif, to the east the Caldera del Tirajana and the Agüimes ramp and to the northeast and north you can see the town of Aguimes itself, the Aguimes Mountain, the Las Rosas plains and the Arinaga Mountain further to the northeast.

The closest notable altitude is Masaciega Mountain, 276 meters high.

== See also ==
- List of municipalities in Las Palmas
