= Cantabria autonomous football team =

National association football team in Spain

Cantabria
- Association: Federación Cántabra de Fútbol
- Head coach: Paco Gento (1997–2000)
- Most caps: Iván Helguera (2)
- Top scorer: Iñaki (2)
First colours	Second colours

First international
- [[Cantabria {{{altlink}}}|Cantabria]] 3–0 Aragon (9 March 1924)

Biggest win
- [[Cantabria {{{altlink}}}|Cantabria]] 3–0 Latvia (23 December 1997)

Biggest defeat
- [[Cantabria {{{altlink}}}|Cantabria]] 0–1 Estonia (22 December 2000)
- Appearances: (first in -)
- Best result: -

The Cantabria autonomous football team is the regional football team for Cantabria, Spain. They are not affiliated with FIFA or UEFA and therefore are only allowed to play friendly matches.

== History ==
=== The Northern Federation ===
In the early 20th century, the Cantabrian players were part of a combined 'North' team, however, this team usually only featured players from the Basque provinces of Biscay and Gipuzkoa, each of which was also organizing their own representative matches occasionally. This 'North' team, which later evolved into the Basque Country team, participated in the first Prince of Asturias Cup tournament in 1915 at Madrid, and they won the title after beating the Catalan team 1–0 and then holding Centro (a team formed by players from the center of Spain) to a 1-1 draw. However, the 'North' team did not use a single Cantabrian player in the tournament, and eventually, the North Federation's negligence of the Cantabrians led to discrepancies between the Basque and Cantabrian representatives which in turn led to the latter abandoning the Northern Football Federation in 1916, which forced the restructuring of the football organization in the north of Spain. Because of this, the Prince of Asturias Cup title holders were unable to participate in the 1916 edition of the competition.

=== The Cantabric Team ===
The Royal Spanish Football Federation allowed the clubs of Cantabria to leave the Northern Regional Championship and join the newly created Cantabrian Regional Federation of Football, along with clubs from the province of Oviedo, soon to be renamed Asturias; and so, in 1917, the Cantabrians joined forces with the Province of Oviedo, and competed in both the 1917 and the 1918 Prince of Asturias Cups as the 'Cantabric Team', taking advantage of the fact that the Northern team was absent because they were going through a convulsive period between the teams from Biscay and Gipuzkoa. The best players of this 'Cantabric Team' side came from Sporting de Gijón, such as Manuel Meana, Manuel Argüelles and the Villaverde brothers (Fernando and Senén), but still they finished in third and second respectively. In 1918, the Cantabrians returned to the North Federation while Asturias marched on alone. The North Federation had been divided in Biscay and Gipuzkoa, with Gipuzkoa forming its own federation and their own championship in the 1918–19 season while the North Championship teams continued with Biscay and the returning Cantabrian clubs. In 1922 the Cantabrian clubs finally left the North Federation to create its own umbrella organisation, which launched the Cantabrian Regional Championship.

The teams of Asturias, Biscay and Gipuzkoa participated in the 1922–23 Prince of Asturias Cup, and although the latter two were eliminated in the early stages of the tournament, Asturias went all the way to claim the trophy after beating Galicia in the final 3-1 (former Cantabrian international Manuel Meana even scored one of the Asturian goals in the final), and in the following tournament, it was Biscay who got the farthest, reaching the semi-finals where they were knocked out by Catalonia, courtesy of an early goal from Cristóbal Martí.

=== The Cantabrian Federation ===
The Federación Cántabra de Fútbol was officially established on 23 October 1922, and three weeks later, on 12 November 1922, the Cantabrian Regional Championship was launched with 28 clubs and 670 players. The name of the federation was amply discussed at the time, going from Federación Regional de Cantabria to Federación Regional Montañesa, but the latter was eventually dismissed as the name Montañesa was applicable to any mountainous territory, so the former was the name chosen.

The first match of the Cantabria national team as the official team of the Cantabrian Federation was held at the El Sardinero two years later, on 9 March 1924, where they faced a fellow debutant team, Aragon; and the result was a 3–0 win for Cantabria with goals from Ortiz, Óscar (the all-time top scorer of Racing de Santander) and Gacituaga, the latter being a defender. The Cantabrian team that lined up that day was mostly made of players from Racing de Santander, with the only two exceptions being the goalkeeper Sainz and Pagaza who were playing for Cantabria's oldest club, Gimnástica de Torrelavega. The second leg was held at Aragon's home, the Campo de la Torre de Bruil in Zaragoza, where they were beaten 0-2, and so, both teams agreed on a new match to define the winner of their meeting, which took place in the following day, 21 April, also at Zaragoza, and the third clash generated so much importance that they were forced to hire a Catalan referee, but despite that, the game was full of controversy, with two penalties for each side leveling the game at 1-1, but since a draw was not an option, both captains decided to prolong the match with an additional 30 minutes, in which the Aragonese team found the winner. In the following year, 1925, they faced Asturias in another two-legged affair, in Santander and El Molinón in Gijón, and this time Cantabria won after a 3-3 draw at home and a 1-0 win away, courtesy of an own goal from a former Cantabric international Manuel Meana.

After a decade of stagnation, the Cantabrian National Team got back together in 1936, playing several games. On 5 September, some meetings were arranged in Santander in tribute and benefit of Socorro Rojo Internacional, and before the local club Racing de Santander faced Athletic Bilbao, Tolosa faced a Cantabria National Team. Two months later, on 29 November 1936, the Cantabrian National Team faced the Basque National Team in El Sardinero with a result of 3-2 in favor of the locals.

=== Revival ===
During the following decades, the illusion of seeing the team again completely disappeared. However, in 1997, the Cantabrian team resurfaced again in a match against Latvia played at Campos de Sport de El Sardinero, and in front of nearly 18,000 people, they won by a score of 3-0 with two goals from Iñaki and one from Pedro Munitis. Francisco Gento, a former Real Madrid player and the footballer who has won the most European Cup titles, was chosen as the coach, and he was the one who formed the Cantabria XI that beat Latvia; and the 37-year-old Fernando Tocornal was the captain of the Cantabrians. A clash against Estonia followed in 2001, and only Chili, Iñaki, Iván Helguera and the coach, Paco Gento, repeated the experience, but the magic was gone and they lost 1-0 courtesy of an early goal from Marko Kristal, a loss attributed to the fact that Cantabria had some of their most outstanding footballers (Iván de la Peña, Pedro Munitis and goalkeeper José María Ceballos) injured. And at the third attempt, in 2003, against Macedonia, the Federation was forced to suspend the match because of the low ticket sales, despite the fact that footballers such as Munitis and Amavisca had confirmed their attendance.

== Selected internationals ==
=== North ===
3 January 1915 Friendly	Basque Country (Note: Matches were played as the 'North Federation' (Norte) team, including Cantabria, but usually featuring only players from the Basque provinces of Biscay and Gipuzkoa, each of which also organised their own representative matches occasionally.)	6–1	Catalonia	Bilbao, Basque Country
	Pichichi; Pagaza; Patricio	Report 1	Kinké	Stadium: San Mamés; Attendance: 6,000

7 February 1915 Friendly	Catalonia	2–2	Basque Country	Barcelona, Catalonia
	Monistrol; Kinké	Report1; Report2	Reguera 0' (o.g.); Belauste	Stadium: Camp de la Indústria; Attendance: 5,000; Referee: Emilio Sampere

12 May 1915 1915 Prince of Asturias Cup	North (Cantabria) (Basque Country (autonomous community))	1–0	Catalonia	Madrid
17:00 CEST	Legarreta	Report		Stadium: Campo de O'Donnell; Referee: (Community of Madrid) Menéndez

14 May 1915 1915 Prince of Asturias Cup	Centro	1–1	(Cantabria) (Basque Country (autonomous community)) North	Madrid
	Bernabéu 1–0'; Petit (penalty missed)	Report	Patricio 1–1'	Stadium: Campo de O'Donnell; Referee: (Community of Madrid) Carlos Dieste

21 May 1916 Friendly	Catalonia	1–3	(Cantabria) (Basque Country (autonomous community)) North	Barcelona, Catalonia
	Kinké	Report	Patricio; Chacho; Pichichi	Stadium: Camp de la Indústria

22 May 1916 Friendly	Catalonia	0–0	(Cantabria) (Basque Country (autonomous community)) North	Barcelona, Catalonia
		Report		Stadium: Camp de la Indústria

4 June 1916 Friendly	North (Cantabria) (Basque Country (autonomous community))	5–0	Catalonia	Bilbao, Basque Country
	Patricio; Legarreta			Stadium: San Mamés; Referee: Luis Hurtado

=== Cantabric ===
10 May 1917 1917 Prince of Asturias Cup	Catalonia	1–0	Cantabric (Asturias) (Cantabria)	Madrid
	Gumbau 30'	Report		Stadium: Campo de O'Donnell; Referee: (Community of Madrid) Menéndez

11 May 1917 1917 Prince of Asturias Cup	Centro	3–2	Cantabric (Asturias) (Cantabria)	Madrid
	Castell 20' (pen.); Agüero 30'; Villaverde 45'	Report	Felgueroso 50'; Pascual 60' (o.g.)	Stadium: Campo de O'Donnell; Referee: (Basque Country (autonomous community)) Pelayo Serrano

20 January 1918 1918 Prince of Asturias Cup	Centro	3–2	Cantabric (Asturias) (Cantabria)	Madrid
	Sansinenea; Gomar; Rey	Report	Villaverde III; Villaverde I	Stadium: Campo de O'Donnell; Referee: (Basque Country (autonomous community)) Pelayo Serrano

23 January 1918 1918 Prince of Asturias Cup	Centro	3–1	Cantabric (Asturias) (Cantabria)	Madrid
	Sansinenea; Olalquiaga	Report; Report2	Villaverde III	Stadium: Campo de O'Donnell; Referee: (Community of Madrid) Carlos Dieste

=== Cantabria ===
9 March 1924 Friendly	Cantabria	3–0	Aragon	Santander, Cantabria
	Ortiz; Óscar; Gacituaga	Report		Stadium: El Sardinero

20 April 1924 Friendly	Aragon	2–0	Cantabria	Zaragoza, Aragon
	Goal	Report		Stadium: Campo de la Torre de Bruil

21 April 1924 Friendly	Aragon	2–1 (a.e.t.)	Cantabria	Zaragoza, Aragon
	(pen.)	Report	(pen.)	Stadium: Campo de la Torre de Bruil; Referee: (Catalonia)

3 May 1925 Friendly	Cantabria	3–3	Asturias	Santander, Cantabria
	Óscar 38' (pen.), 79' ? 2–2'		Abdón 28'; Domingo 0–2'; Trucha 2–3'	Stadium: El Sardinero; Referee: Blanco

21 June 1925 Friendly	Asturias	0–1	Cantabria	Gijón, Asturias
			Meana ?' (o.g.)	Stadium: El Molinón

5 September 1936 Friendly	Cantabria	0–3	Tolosa	Santander, Cantabria
		Report		Stadium: El Sardinero

29 November 1936 Friendly	Cantabria	3–2	Basque Country	Santander, Cantabria
		Report		Stadium: El Sardinero

22 December 1997 Friendly	Cantabria	3–0	Latvia	Santander, Cantabria
	Iñaki; Munitis	Report		Stadium: Campos de Sport de El Sardinero; Attendance: 18,000

22 December 2000 Friendly	Cantabria	0–1	Estonia	Santander
		Report	Marko Kristal 16'	Stadium: Campos de Sport de El Sardinero; Attendance: 6,000; Referee: Alfonso Pérez Burrull, Cantabria

December 2003 Friendly	Cantabria	'Cancelled'	Macedonia
		Report

== Honours ==
- Philippines Championship: 1

1924

== Women's team ==
The women's team made its debut on 19 May 2019 in Santa Cruz de Bezana. They defeated Asturias by 3–2.

19 May 2019	Cantabria	3–2	Asturias	Santa Cruz de Bezana
12:00	Alba 9'; Jimena 10'; Athenea 90'	Report	Méndez 50'; Alejandra 80'	Stadium: Municipal; Referee: Bolado Palencia

== Honours ==
Prince of Asturias Cup:

- Champions (1): 1915 (Note: As part of the North team.)
- Runners-up (1): 1918 (Note: As the Cantabric team.)

== Notable players ==
- José Amavisca
- Pablo Casar
- José María Ceballos
- Álvaro Cervera
- Pablo Díaz
- Pedro Dorronsoro
- Vicente Engonga
- Orlando Gutiérrez
- Iván Helguera
- Iñaki
- Pedro Munitis
- Neru
- Óscar
- Iván de la Peña
- Nacho Rodríguez
- Fernando Tocornal

== See also ==
- Category:Footballers from Cantabria
