= Moruca =

Spanish footballer and manager

Personal information
- Full name: Manuel Fernández Mora
- Date of birth: 10 October 1932
- Place of birth: Vargas, Spain
- Date of death: 1 January 2017 (aged 84)
- Place of death: Santander, Spain
- Position: Forward

Youth career
- 1945–1949: Los Kotskas

Senior career*
Years	Team	Apps	(Gls)
1949–1951	Rayo Cantabria		
1951	Racing Santander	1	(0)
1951–1954	Betis		
1954–1955	Eibar	4	(0)
1955–1956	Rayo Cantabria		

Managerial career
- Ayrón
- Cantabria (youth)
- 1963: Racing Santander (interim)
- 1969–1972: Racing Santander
- 1972–1973: Osasuna
- 1975–1976: Gimnástica
- 1976–1978: Barakaldo
- 1978: Elche
- 1980–1983: Racing Santander
- * Club domestic league appearances and goals

Manuel Fernández Mora (10 October 1932 – 1 January 2017), known as Moruca, was a Spanish professional football forward and manager.

== Playing career ==
Born in Vargas, Cantabria, Moruca started playing with Rayo Cantabria who acted as farm team to Racing de Santander. On 25 March 1951 he took part in his first and only La Liga match with the latter side, in a 1–2 away loss against RCD Español.

At the professional level, Moruca also appeared for SD Eibar in Segunda División. He also represented Real Betis, retiring in 1956 at the age of 24 with his first club Rayo Cantabria.

== Coaching career ==
After working with CA Osasuna, Gimnástica de Torrelavega and Barakaldo CF, promoting the latter to the second level in 1977, Moruca returned to Racing on a permanent basis in 1969–70 – he had already acted as interim manager six seasons before. He achieved promotion from Tercera División that year and, in 1981, with him still in charge, they reached the top flight for the first time ever with a team composed mainly of local players.

Moruca went on to rank second in Racing's all-time list of managers with most games, only behind José María Maguregui.
