= Rubén García (footballer, born 1981) =

Spanish footballer

Personal information
- Full name: Rubén García Martínez
- Date of birth: 6 December 1981 (age 44)
- Place of birth: O Barco, Spain
- Height: 1.73 m (5 ft 8 in)
- Position: Midfielder

Team information
- Current team: Barco

Youth career
- Racing Santander

Senior career*
Years	Team	Apps	(Gls)
2000–2007	Racing B	122	(2)
2001–2002	→ Gimnástica (loan)	25	(0)
2004–2005	→ Zamora (loan)	32	(1)
2006–2007	→ Eibar (loan)	27	(0)
2007–2008	Puertollano	16	(0)
2008–2009	Cultural Leonesa	46	(1)
2009–2010	Oviedo	27	(0)
2010–2011	Real Unión	26	(0)
2011–2012	Lugo	30	(0)
2012–2013	Logroñés	15	(1)
2013	Salamanca	11	(0)
2013–2014	Noja	33	(0)
2014–2015	Cultural Leonesa	19	(1)
2015–	Barco		
- * Club domestic league appearances and goals as of 1 April 2018

Rubén García Martínez (born 6 December 1981) is a Spanish footballer who plays for CD Barco as a central midfielder.

== Club career ==
Born in O Barco de Valdeorras, Province of Ourense, García finished his youth career with Racing de Santander, and made his senior debut with the reserves in the 2000–01 season, in Segunda División B. After a loan spell with Gimnástica de Torrelavega he returned to the former, and on 19 July 2003 he played his first match as a professional, coming on as a first-half substitute in a 0–1 home loss against FC Slovan Liberec for that year's UEFA Intertoto Cup.

In summer 2004, García joined Zamora CF also on loan. Two years later he signed with SD Eibar, in the same situation and still in the third level.

García was released by Racing in 2007 and continued to compete in that tier, representing CD Puertollano, Cultural y Deportiva Leonesa (two stints), Real Oviedo, Real Unión, CD Lugo, UD Logroñés, UD Salamanca and SD Noja.
