= Ezequiel Loza =

Spanish footballer and manager

Personal information
- Full name: Ezequiel Antonio Loza Fernández
- Date of birth: 1 October 1976 (age 50)
- Place of birth: Santoña, Spain
- Height: 1.85 m (6 ft 1 in)
- Position: Centre back

Team information
- Current team: Racing B (manager)

Youth career
- 1994–1995: Racing Santander

Senior career*
| Years | Team | Apps | (Gls) |
| 1995–1998 | Racing B | 6+ | (0) |
| 1998–1999 | Noja | 32 | (0) |
| 1999–2000 | Logroñés B | | |
| 2000 | Logroñés | 3 | (0) |
| 2000–2001 | Ourense | 14 | (0) |
| 2001–2002 | Ponferradina | 32 | (0) |
| 2002–2008 | Gimnástica Torrelavega | 122+ | (2) |
| Total | | 209+ | (2) |

Managerial career
- 2009–2011: Gimnástica Torrelavega (youth)
- 2011–2013: Gimnástica Torrelavega B
- 2013–2014: Gimnástica Torrelavega
- 2014–2015: Portugalete
- 2018–2021: Portugalete
- 2021–: Racing B
- * Club domestic league appearances and goals

Ezequiel Antonio Loza Fernández (born 1 October 1976) is a Spanish retired footballer who played as a central defender, and currently the manager of Rayo Cantabria.

== Playing career ==
Born in Santoña, Cantabria, Loza was a Racing de Santander youth graduate, and made his senior debut with the reserves in 1994. After helping the B's to promote to Segunda División B in 1996, being also an unused substitute in the first team on three occasions.

In 1999, after a one-year spell with SD Noja, Loza signed for CD Logroñés; initially assigned to the B-team in Tercera División, he made his professional debut on 30 April 2000, starting in a 2–2 Segunda División away draw against Albacete Balompié.

After another two first team appearances for Logroñés, Loza moved to third division side CD Ourense in 2000. He continued to appear in the category in the following years, representing SD Ponferradina and Gimnástica de Torrelavega.

In 2008, after two relegations and one promotion with Torrelavega, Loza retired at the age of 31.

== Managerial career ==
After retiring, Loza worked as a manager of the youth and reserve sides of his last club Gimnástica, before being named first team manager in 2013. Despite winning the group, his side missed out promotion in the play-offs.

On 11 June 2014, Loza took over fellow fourth tier side Club Portugalete, After achieving promotion in his first season, he was sacked on 23 November 2015, with the club in the last position in their group.

On 17 June 2016, Loza returned to his first club Racing, as a coordinator of the youth categories. He returned to managerial duties on 28 June 2018, after being again named manager of Portugalete.

Loza led Portu back to the third tier after a five-year absence, but was dismissed on 18 January 2021. On 17 May, he again returned to Racing, now as manager of the B-team for the 2021–22 campaign.

After guiding Rayo Cantabria to the play-offs (where they lost to Real Murcia), Loza renewed his contract with the club until 2023 on 17 June 2022. Exactly one year later, he agreed to a new one-year deal. On 1 July 2024, Loza signed a new two-year deal, which sees him under contract with Rayo Cantabria until the summer of 2026.

== Managerial statistics ==
As of 14 November 2026

Managerial record by team and tenure
| Team | Nat | From | To | Record | | | | | | | | Ref |
| Team | Nat | From | To | G | W | D | L | GF | GA | GD | Win % | Ref |
|---|---|---|---|---|---|---|---|---|---|---|---|---|
| Gimnástica Torrelavega B | (Spain) | 1 July 2011 | 30 June 2013 | 68 | 31 | 15 | 22 | 115 | 82 | +33 | 45.59 | |
| Gimnástica Torrelavega | (Spain) | 1 July 2013 | 11 June 2014 | 42 | 27 | 10 | 5 | 85 | 26 | +59 | 64.29 | |
| Portugalete | (Spain) | 11 June 2014 | 23 November 2015 | 59 | 23 | 24 | 12 | 87 | 52 | +35 | 38.98 | |
| Portugalete | (Spain) | 28 June 2018 | 18 January 2021 | 89 | 49 | 22 | 18 | 132 | 67 | +65 | 55.06 | |
| Rayo Cantabria | (Spain) | 17 May 2021 | Present | 184 | 70 | 56 | 58 | 268 | 228 | +40 | 38.04 | |
| Total | | | | 442 | 200 | 127 | 115 | 687 | 455 | +232 | 45.25 | — |

== Honours ==
=== Manager ===
Gimnástica

- Tercera División: 2013–14

Club Portugalete

- Tercera División: 2014–15
- Tercera División: 2018–19
- Tercera División: 2019–20
