= List of transfers of La Liga – 2005–06 season =

This is a list of Spanish football transfers for the 2005–06 La Liga season. Transfers are only allowed in limited transfer windows in summer and winter.

== Deportivo Alavés ==
In:

- (Uruguay) Pacheco - On loan from Albacete Balompié
- (Spain) Ibon Begoña - Signed from Gimnástic de Tarragona
- (Bulgaria) Georgiev - On loan from Slavia Sofia
- (Brazil) Elton Giovanni - Signed from Santos FC
- (Argentina) Costanzo - Signed from River Plate
- (Spain) Gaspar - Signed from Albacete Balompié
- (Spain) Mena - Signed from Xerez CD
- (Spain) Jandro - Signed from Celta de Vigo
- (Spain) Juanito - Signed from Málaga CF
- (Brazil) Wesley - Signed from Peñafiel
- (Spain) Poli - Signed from RCD Mallorca
- (France) Lacen - Signed from Valence FC
- (France) Gnakpa - Signed from Racing de Santander
- (Gabon) Antchouet - Signed from Os Belenenses
- (Argentina) Pellegrino - Signed from Liverpool F.C.
- (Australia) Aloisi - Signed from CA Osasuna
- (Brazil) Arturo - Signed from Racing de Santander

Out:

- (Brazil) Wesley - On loan to Vitória Guimarães
- (Gabon) Antchouet - On loan to Vitória Guimarães
- (Spain) Bernardo - On loan to CD Tenerife
- (Spain) Orlandi - On loan to FC Barcelona
- (Spain) David Sanchéz - Return to FC Barcelona
- (Spain) Santamaria - Return to FC Barcelona
- (France) (European Union) Sarr - Return to RC Lens
- (Spain) Nacho - Transferred to Racing de Ferrol
- (Spain) Abel - Transferred to UD Salamanca
- (Spain) Kiko - Transferred to Poli Ejido
- (Equatorial Guinea) Epitié - Transferred to CD Castellon
- (Spain) Angel - Transferred to Ciudad de Murcia
- (Spain) Juan Pablo - Transferred to CD Numancia
- (Argentina) Flotta - Transferred to Deportes Tolima

== Athletic Club Bilbao ==
In:

- (Spain) Aduriz - Signed - from Real Valladolid
- (Spain) Bordas - Return from Terrassa
- (Spain) Zubiaurre - Signed from Real Sociedad (Pending...)
- (Spain) Mendilíbar - Signed from - Eibar
- (Spain) Angulo - Return from Gimnástic
- (Spain) Expósito - Signed from CA Osasuna

Out:

- (Spain) Ibon Gutiérrez - On loan to CD Numancia
- (Spain) Tarantino - On loan from CD Numancia
- (Spain) Javi González - On loan to FC Ashdod
- (Spain) Pampín - On loan to Real Union
- (Spain) Jonan - On loan to CD Castellon
- (Spain) Cesar - On loan to SD Eibar
- (Spain) Azkorra - On loan to CD Numancia
- (Spain) Arriaga - On loan to SD Eibar
- (Spain) Moya - On loan to SD Eibar
- (Spain) Solabarrieta - On loan to SD Eibar
- (Spain) Del Horno - Transferred to Chelsea
- (Spain) Ezquerro - Transferred to FC Barcelona
- (Spain) Ernesto Valverde - To ¿?
- (Spain) Oskar Vales - Retired

== Atlético Madrid ==
In:

- (Serbia and Montenegro) Mateja Kežman - Signed from Chelsea F.C.
- (Argentina) Maxi Rodríguez - Signed from RCD Espanyol
- (Argentina) Galletti - Signed from Real Zaragoza
- (Spain) Valera - Signed from Real Murcia
- (Bulgaria) Martin Petrov - Signed from Wolfsburg
- (Spain) Gabi - Return from Getafe

Out:

- (Spain) Braulio - On loan to RCD Mallorca
- (Spain) Arizmendi - Transferred to Deportivo de La Coruña
- (Spain) Jacobo - On loan to UE Lleida
- (Spain) Raúl Medina - On loan to Ciudad de Murcia
- (Netherlands) Kiki Musampa - On loan to Manchester City
- (Spain) Jorge Larena - On loan to Celta Vigo
- (Argentina) Pínola - On loan to Nürnberg
- (Uruguay) Richard Núñez - On loan to Cruz Azul
- (Spain) Toché - On loan to Hércules CF
- (Uruguay) Sosa - On loan to CA Osasuna
- (Spain) Nano - On loan to Getafe CF
- (Romania) Contra - On loan to Getafe CF
- (Spain) Salva - Return to Valencia
- (Serbia and Montenegro) Paunovic - Transferred to Getafe CF
- (Spain) Aragoneses - Transferred to Elche CF
- (Spain) Novo - Transferred to Real Sociedad
- (Denmark) Grønkjær - Transferred to Stuttgart
- (Spain) Aguilera - Retired
- (Spain) Sergi - Retired

== FC Barcelona ==
In:

- (Spain) Santiago Ezquerro - Signed from Athletic de Bilbao
- (Netherlands) Mark van Bommel - Signed from PSV Eindhoven

Out:

- (Spain) Damià Abella - On loan to Racing de Santander
- (Argentina) Javier Saviola - On loan to Sevilla FC
- (Spain) Fernando Navarro - On loan to RCD Mallorca
- (Turkey) Rüştü Reçber - On loan to Fenerbahçe
- (Spain) Sergio Santamaría - On loan to Albacete Balompié
- (Spain) Oscar Lopez - On loan to Real Betis
- (Spain) Ramón Ros - On loan to UE Lleida
- (Spain) Pedro Mario - On loan to Real Valladolid
- (Spain) Dani Tortolero - Transferred to Gimnàstic de Tarragona
- (Brazil) Fabio Rochemback - Transferred to Middlesbrough
- (Spain) Gerard López Segú - Transferred to AS Monaco
- (Argentina) Juan Román Riquelme - Transferred to Villarreal CF
- (Spain) Sergio García - Transferred to Real Zaragoza
- (Spain) David Sánchez Rodríguez - Transferred to Albacete Balompié
- (Italy) Demetrio Albertini - Retired

== Real Betis ==
In:

- (Brazil) Robert - On loan from PSV Eindhoven
- (Brazil) Tardelli - On loan from São Paulo FC
- (Spain) Miguel Angel - Signed from Málaga CF
- (Spain) Rivera - Signed from Levante UD
- (Spain) Xisco - Signed from Valencia CF
- (Spain) Nano - Signed from Getafe CF
- (Spain) Juanlu - Signed from CD Numancia
- (Spain) Oscar López - On loan from FC Barcelona

Out:

- (Brazil) Oliveira - On loan to São Paulo FC
- (Spain) Juanlu - On loan to Albacete Balompié
- (Spain) Jaime - On loan to UD Las Palmas
- (Spain) David Llano - On loan to Real Jaén
- (Spain) Pablo Niño - On loan to CD Numancia
- (Brazil) Denilson - Transferred to Girondins de Bordeaux
- (Equatorial Guinea) Benjamín - Transferred to Cadiz CF
- (Spain) Prats - Transferred to Mallorca
- (Spain) Ismael - Transferred to Xerez CD
- (Spain) Ito - Transferred to RCD Espanyol
- (Spain) Mingo - Transferred to Albacete Balompié
- (Portugal) Joao Tomás - Transferred to Sporting de Braga
- (Spain) Tote - Transferred to Valladolid CF
- (Uruguay) Tais - Retired
- (Spain) Alfonso - Retired

== Cadiz CF ==
In:

- (Argentina) Vella - Signed from Newell's Old Boys
- (Spain) Morán - Signed from Racing de Santander
- (Argentina) Lobos - Signed from Gimnasia y Esgrima La Plata
- (Uruguay) Alex Medina - Signed from Nacional de Montevideo
- (Paraguay) Acuña - Signed from Olimpia
- (Spain) Ivan Ania - Signed from Gimnastic
- (Portugal) Mario Silva - Signed from Recreativo de Huelva
- (Argentina) Limia - Signed from Arsenal de Sarandí
- (Spain) Bezares - Signed from Sevilla FC
- (Spain) Bertran - Signed from RCD Espanyol
- (Argentina) Berizzo Signed from Celta de Vigo
- (Equatorial Guinea) Benjamín - On loan from Real Betis
- (Uruguay) Estoyanoff - On loan from Valencia CF

Out:

- (Spain) Bertran - On loan to Lorca Deportiva
- (Spain) Manolo Pérez - Transferred to Hércules CF
- (Spain) Solano - On loan to Leganés
- (Spain) Miguel García - On loan to CD Castellón
- (Spain) Velázquez - On loan to Lorca Deportiva
- (The Gambia) Samba - On loan to Málaga B
- (Spain) Ezequiel - On loan to Málaga B
- (Spain) De Gomar - On loan to Rayo Vallecano
- (Spain) Fredi - Return to Sevilla FC
- (Spain) Armada - Transferred to Ciudad de Murcia
- (Spain) Dani Navarrete - Transferred to Hércules CF

== Celta de Vigo ==
In:

- (Brazil) Roberto - Signed from Guaraní
- (Brazil) Iriney - Signed from Rayo Vallecano
- (Spain) Nuñez - Signed from Liverpool F.C.
- (Spain) Perera - Signed from RCD Mallorca
- (Brazil) Baiano - Signed from Málaga CF
- (Argentina) Placente - Signed from Bayer Leverkusen
- (Uruguay) Canobbio - Signed from Valencia CF
- (Spain) Javi Guerrero - Signed from Racing de Santander
- (Spain) Esteban - Signed from Sevilla FC
- (Netherlands) Daniel de Ridder - Signed from Ajax
- (Mexico) Carlos Vela - On loan from Arsenal F.C.
- (Spain) Jorge Larena - On loan from Atlético de Madrid
- (Spain) Jose Enrique - On loan from Valencia CF
- (Spain) Silva - On loan from Valencia CF
- (Argentina) Lequi - On loan from SS Lazio

Out:

- (Spain) Isaac - On loan to Racing de Ferrol
- (Spain) Bouzón - On loan to Recreativo de Huelva
- (Spain) Jorge Rodríguez - On loan to Racing de Ferrol
- (Spain) Orlando Quintana - On loan to Lorca Deportiva
- (Spain) Toni Moral - On loan to CD Tenerife
- (Spain) Israel - On loan to Córdoba CF
- (Greece) Vryzas - Return to ACF Fiorentina
- (Spain) Nagore - Return to RCD Mallorca
- (Argentina) Sava - Return To Fulham
- (Portugal) Capucho - Return to Rangers
- (Brazil) Roger - Return to Corinthians
- (Spain) Manolo - Transferred to Racing de Ferrol
- (Argentina) Berizzo - Transferred to Cádiz CF
- (Spain) Jandro - Transferred to Deportivo Alavés
- (Spain) Jose Ignacio - Transferred to CD Logroñés

== Deportivo de La Coruña ==
In:

- (Spain) Gallardo - On loan from Sevilla FC
- (Spain) Arizmendi - Signed from Atletico de Madrid
- (Uruguay) Taborda - Signed from Defensor de Montevideo
- (Canada) De Guzman - Signed from Hannover 96
- (Spain) Juanma - Signed from Racing de Santander
- (Spain) Rubén - Return from Albacete Balompié
- (Spain) Momo - Return from Albacete Balompié

Out:

- (Argentina) Scaloni - On loan to West Ham United
- (Spain) Pablo Amo - Transferred to Real Valladolid
- (Spain) Changui - On loan to Xanthi FC
- (Uruguay) Abreu - Transferred to Dorados
- (Spain) Luque - Transferred to Newcastle United
- (Uruguay) Pandiani - Transferred to Birmingham City
- (Spain) Fran - Retired
- (Brazil) Mauro Silva - Retired

== RCD Espanyol ==
In:

- (Uruguay) Walter Pandiani - Signed from Birmingham City F.C.
- (Spain) Luis García - Signed from RCD Mallorca
- (Mozambique) Armando Sá - Signed from Villarreal CF
- (Argentina) Zabaleta - Signed from San Lorenzo de Almagro
- (Brazil) Costa - Signed from Olympique de Marseille
- (Spain) Jofre - Signed from Levante UD
- (Spain) Riera - Signed from Girondins de Bordeaux
- (Spain) Ito - Signed from Real Betis
- (Spain) Juanfran - On loan from Real Madrid
- (Spain) Hurtado - Return from Eibar
- (Spain) Iraizoz - Return from Eibar

Out:

- (Spain) Soldevilla - Transferred to Polideportivo Ejido
- (Spain) Jonathan Soriano - On loan to UD Almería
- (Spain) Toni Velamazán - Transferred to UD Almería
- (Spain) Morales - Transferred to Gimnàstic de Tarragona
- (Spain) Riera - On loan to Manchester City F.C.
- (Spain) Héctor - On loan to Racing de Ferrol
- (Spain) Carlos García - On loan to UD Almería
- (Spain) Serrano - On loan to Racing de Santander
- (Spain) Miñambres - Return to Real Madrid
- (Argentina) Maxi Rodríguez - Transferred to Atlético de Madrid
- (Argentina) Hugo Benjamín Ibarra - Transferred to Boca Juniors
- (Spain) Bertran - Transferred to Cádiz CF
- (Belgium) Erwin Lemmens - Transferred to Olympiacos
- (Spain) Àlex Fernández - Transferred to Xerez CD
- (Spain) Dani - Transferred to Olympiacos
- (Romania) Raducanu - Transferred to FC Vaslui
- (Spain) Raúl Molina - Transferred to Rayo Vallecano
- (Spain) Amavisca - Retired

== Getafe CF ==
In:

- (Brazil) Jaja Coelho - Signed from Westerlo FC
- (Switzerland) Celestini - Signed from UD Levante
- (Spain) Paredes - Signed from Real Madrid B
- (Serbia and Montenegro) Paunovic - Signed from Atletico de Madrid
- (Spain) Rebollo - Signed from San Sebastián de los Reyes
- (Spain) Luis García - Signed from Real Zaragoza
- (Spain) Alberto - Signed from Málaga B
- (Spain) Güiza - Signed from Ciudad de Murcia
- (Argentina) Matellán - Signed from Boca Juniors
- (Romania) Contra - On loan from Atlético de Madrid
- (Spain) Redondo - On loan from Valencia CF
- (Spain) Nano - On loan from Atletico de Madrid
- (Spain) Gavilán - On loan from Valencia CF
- (Spain) Calatayud - On loan from Málaga CF

Out:

- (Spain) Albiol - Return to Valencia CF
- (Spain) Gabi - Return to Atlético de Madrid
- (Spain) Aragoneses - Return to Atlético de Madrid
- (Cameroon) Kome - Return to RCD Mallorca
- (Spain) Gallardo - Return To Sevilla FC
- (Spain) Yordi - Transferred to RCD Mallorca
- (Spain) Alberto - Transferred to Elche CF
- (Spain) Sánchez Broto - Transferred to Hércules CF
- (Spain) Yanguas - Transferred to CD Numancia
- (Spain) Nano - Transferred to Betis Balompié
- (Spain) Quique Medina - Transferred to Elche CF
- (Spain) Asen - Transferred to Extremadura

== Real Madrid ==
In:

- (Italy) Cassano - Signed from A.S. Roma
- (Brazil) Cicinho - Signed from São Paulo
- (Uruguay) Carlos Diogo - Signed from CA River Plate
- (Uruguay) Pablo García - Signed from CA Osasuna
- (Brazil) Júlio Baptista - Signed from Sevilla FC
- (Brazil) Robinho - Signed from Santos FC
- (Spain) Sergio Ramos - Signed from Sevilla FC
- (Spain) Carlos Sánchez - Return from Polideportivo Ejido
- (Spain) Óscar Miñambres - Return from RCD Espanyol

Out:

- (Spain) Borja Fernández - On loan to RCD Mallorca
- (Spain) Javier Portillo - On loan to Club Brugge KV
- (Spain) Juanfran - On loan to RCD Espanyol
- (Spain) Carlos Sánchez - On loan to Unión Deportiva Almería
- (Spain) César Sánchez - Transferred to Real Zaragoza
- (Andorra) Albert Celades - Transferred to Real Zaragoza
- (Argentina) Santiago Solari - Transferred to FC Internazionale
- (Argentina) Walter Samuel - Transferred to FC Internazionale
- (Portugal) Luís Figo - Transferred to FC Internazionale
- (England) Michael Owen - Transferred to Newcastle United

== Málaga CF ==
In:

- (Portugal) Jorge Ribeiro - On loan from Dinamo Moscow
- (Spain) Antonio López - On loan from Sevilla FC
- (Brazil) Gabriel - Signed from Fluminense
- (Brazil) Bóvio - Signed from Santos FC
- (Brazil) Anderson - loaned from Everton
- (Spain) Paco Esteban - Signed to Málaga B
- (Uruguay) Morales - Signed from CA Osasuna
- (Spain) Salva - Signed from Valencia CF
- (Spain) Pablo Couñago - Signed from Ipswich Town
- (Spain) Hidalgo - Signed from CD Tenerife
- (Spain) Nacho - Return from Levante UD

Out:

- (Spain) Paco Esteban - On loan to Ciudad de Murcia
- (Spain) Calatayud - On loan to Getafe CF
- (Spain) Tote - Return to Real Betis
- (Spain) Iznata - Transferred to Rayo Vallecano
- (Switzerland) Alex Geijo - Transferred to Xerez CD
- (Brazil) Baiano - Transferred to Celta de Vigo
- (Spain) Juanito - Transferred to Deportivo Alavés
- (Spain) Michel - Transferred to Real Murcia
- (Brazil) Amoroso - Transferred to São Paulo FC
- (Costa Rica) Wanchope - Transferred to Al-Gharrafa
- (Spain) Miguel Ángel - Transferred to Real Betis

== RCD Mallorca ==
In:

- (Spain) Braulio - On loan from Atletico de Madrid
- (Greece) Basinas - Signed from Panathinaikos
- (Portugal) Nunes - Signed from Sporting Braga
- (Argentina) Pisculichi - Signed from Argentinos Juniors
- (Italy) Doni - Signed from UC Sampdoria
- (Spain) Yordi - Signed from Getafe CF
- (Argentina) Jonás Gutiérrez - Signed from Vélez Sársfield
- (Argentina) Tuzzio - Signed from River Plate
- (Argentina) Peralta - Signed from Instituto de Córdoba
- (Italy) Potenza - On loan from Internazionale
- (Greece) Choutos - On loan from Internazionale
- (Argentina) Maciel - Signed from Real Murcia
- (Spain) Prats - Signed from Real Betis
- (Spain) Toni González - Signed from Ciudad de Murcia
- (Spain) Borja - On loan from Real Madrid
- (Spain) Fernando Navarro - On loan from FC Barcelona
- (Japan) Yoshito Okubo - loan extended from Cerezo Osaka

Out:

- (Greece) Choutos - Return to Internazionale
- (Italy) Iuliano - Transferred to UC Sampdoria
- (Cameroon) Ngom Kome - On loan to Ciudad de Murcia
- (Spain) Cifuentes - On loan to Rayo Vallecano
- (Spain) Iván Ramis - On loan to Real Valladolid
- (Spain) Carmona - On loan to Real Valladolid
- (Spain) Jorge López - Return to Valencia CF
- (Uruguay) De los Santos - Return to Valencia CF
- (Spain) Toni González - Transferred to Real Oviedo
- (Spain) Luis García - Transferred to RCD Espanyol
- (Spain) Nagore - Transferred to Levante UD
- (Argentina) Romeo - Transferred to CA Osasuna
- (Spain) Poli - Transferred to Deportivo Alavés
- (Brazil) Felipe Melo - Transferred to Racing de Santander
- (Netherlands) Westerveld - Transferred to Portsmouth
- (Spain) Perera - Transferred to Celta de Vigo
- (Uruguay) Fernando Correa - Transferred to Peñarol
- (Serbia and Montenegro) Delibasic - Transferred to Sporting Braga
- (Spain) Marcos - Retired
- (Spain) Nadal - Retired

== CA Osasuna ==
In:

- (Uruguay) Sosa - On loan from Atletico de Madrid
- (Argentina) Romeo - Signed from RCD Mallorca
- (Spain) Ricardo - Signed from Manchester United
- (Spain) Brit - Return from UD Salamanca

Out:

- (Spain) Iván Rosado - On loan to Xerez CD
- (Uruguay) Morales - Transferred to Málaga CF
- (Australia) Aloisi - Transferred to Deportivo Alavés
- (Spain) Expósito - Transferred to Athletic de Bilbao
- (Uruguay) Pablo García - Transferred to Real Madrid
- (Spain) Sanzol - Transferred to Albacete Balompié
- (Spain) Jusué - Transferred to UD San Sebastián de los Reyes

== Racing de Santander ==
In:

- (Spain) Valencia - Signed from Gimnàstic de Tarragona
- (Spain) Pablo Alfaro - Signed from Sevilla FC
- (Argentina) Ezequiel Garay - Signed from Newell's Old Boys
- (Spain) Damia - On loan from FC Barcelona
- (Chile) Pinilla - On loan from Sporting Lisbon
- (Spain) Serrano - Signed from RCD Espanyol
- (France) Stephane Dalmat - Signed from Internazionale
- (France) Wilfred Dalmat - Signed from Grenoble
- (Brazil) Melo - Signed from RCD Mallorca
- (Spain) Casquero - Signed from Sevilla FC
- (Spain) Vitolo - Signed from CD Tenerife
- (Spain) Pinillos - Signed from Levante UD
- (Spain) Ruben Garcia - Signed from Zamora
- (Spain) Neru - Signed from Sporting de Gijón
- (Spain) Antoñito - On loan from Sevilla FC

Out:

- (Spain) Toño - On loan to Recreativo de Huelva
- (Spain) Fernando Marqués - On loan to Atletico de Madrid B
- (Spain) Pablo Casar - Transferred to Real Valladolid
- (Spain) Moran - Transferred to Cadiz CF
- (France) Bertin - On loan to CD Tenerife
- (Spain) Sierra - Transferred to Real Murcia
- (Mexico) Torrado - Transferred to Cruz Azul
- (Uruguay) Mauro - Transferred to Racing de Ferrol
- (Spain) Javi Guerrero - Transferred to Celta de Vigo
- (Uruguay) Regueiro - Transferred to Valencia CF
- (Spain) Juanma - Transferred to Deportivo de La Coruña
- (Brazil) Arthuro - Transferred to Deportivo Alavés
- (Israel) Benayoun - Transferred to West Ham United
- (Brazil) Anderson - Transferred to Everton
- (Spain) Parri - Return to Valencia CF
- (Spain) Pedro Lopez - Return to Valencia CF
- (Spain) Arizmendi - Return to Atletico de Madrid
- (Mexico) Carlos a. Pineda Escalera - Return to UNAM
- (Mexico) Eduardo Felipe Pineda - Return to UNAM

== Sevilla FC ==
In:

- (France) Escudé - Signed from Ajax
- (Serbia and Montenegro) Dragutinovic - Signed from Standard Liège
- (Mali) Kanouté - Signed from Tottenham Hotspurs
- (Spain) David Prieto - Promoted from Sevilla B
- (Spain) Kepa - Promoted from Sevilla B
- (Spain) Diego Capel - Promoted from Sevilla B
- (Brazil) Luís Fabiano - Signed from F.C. Porto
- (Italy) Maresca - Signed from Juventus
- (Spain) Palop - Signed from Valencia
- (Spain) Gallardo - loan return from Getafe
- (Argentina) Saviola - On loan from Barcelona

Out

- (Spain) Gallardo - On loan to Deportivo
- (Spain) Antonio López - On loan to Málaga
- (Spain) Carlitos - Transferred to Hércules
- (Spain) Pablo Alfaro - Transferred to Racing Santander
- (Spain) Aranda - On loan to Albacete
- (Spain) Redondo - Transferred to Hércules
- (Spain) Óscar - Transferred to Poli Ejido
- (Spain) Dani Bautista - On loan to Recreativo
- (Spain) Marco Navas - On loan to Poli Ejido
- (Spain) Antoñito - On loan to Racing Santander
- (Spain) Sergio Ramos - Transferred to Real Madrid
- (Uruguay) Darío Silva - Transferred to Portsmouth
- (Spain) Esteban - Transferred to Celta
- (Spain) Casquero - Transferred to Racing Santander
- (Spain) Bezares - Transferred to Cádiz
- (Brazil) Júlio Baptista - Transferred to Real Madrid
- (Spain) Barragán - Transferred to Liverpool
- (Spain) Fredi - Transferred to Castellón

== Real Sociedad ==
In:

- (Colombia) Viáfara - On loan from Portsmouth
- (Chile) Mark González - On loan from Liverpool
- (Denmark) Skoubo - Signed from Brøndby IF
- (Slovenia) Stevanovic - Signed from NK Donzale
- (Spain) Novo - Signed from Atletico de Madrid
- (Spain) Cifuentes - Return from SD Eibar
- (Spain) Garitano - Return from SD Eibar
- (Spain) Oskitz - Return from SD Eibar

Out

- (Brazil) Adriano Rossato - On loan to Sporting Braga
- (Spain) Domínguez - On loan to SD Eibar
- (Spain) Romero - On loan to Banfield
- (Spain) Llorente - On loan to Real Valladolid
- (Spain) Mayrata - On loan to SD Eibar
- (Spain) Bergara - On loan to SD Eibar
- (Spain) Zubikarai - On loan to SD Eibar
- (Brazil) Luiz Alberto - Transferred to Santos FC
- (Spain) Arteta - Transferred to Everton
- (Spain) Zubiaurre - Transferred to Athletic de Bilbao
- (Serbia and Montenegro) Mladenovic - Transferred to Glasgow Rangers
- (Spain) Alkiza - Retired
- (Russia) Karpin - Retired

== Valencia CF ==
In:

- (Portugal) Miguel - Signed from SL Benfica
- (Netherlands) Kluivert - Signed from Newcastle United
- (Spain) Villa - Signed from Real Zaragoza
- (Brazil) Edu - Signed from Arsenal
- (Uruguay) Regueiro - Signed from Racing de Santander
- (Spain) Cerra - Signed from Alicante CF
- (Spain) Mora - Signed from Levante UD
- (Portugal) Hugo Viana - On loan from Newcastle United
- (Spain) Albiol - Return from Getafe CF
- (Spain) Jorge López - Return from RCD Mallorca
- (Uruguay) de los Santos - Return from RCD Mallorca

Out:

- (Uruguay) de los Santos - Transferred
- Caneira - On loan to Sporting C Portugal
- (Italy) Di Vaio - On loan to AS Monaco FC
- (Spain) Ruz - On loan to Gimnàstic de Tarragona
- (Spain) Jose Enrique - On loan to Celta de Vigo
- (Italy) Corradi - On loan to FC Parma
- (Spain) Santa Cruz - On loan to Real Madrid C
- (Paraguay) Amarilla - On loan to CD Badajoz
- (Spain) Valle - On loan to Hércules CF
- (Uruguay) Estoyanoff - On loan to Cadiz CF
- (Italy) Fiore - On loan to ACF Fiorentina
- (Spain) Silva - On loan to Celta de Vigo
- (Spain) Gavilan - On loan to Getafe CF
- (Spain) Redondo - On loan to Getafe CF
- (Spain) Pedro López - Transferred to Real Valladolid
- (Spain) Parri - Transferred to Albacete Balompié
- (Uruguay) Canobbio - Transferred to Celta de Vigo
- (Spain) Salva - Transferred to Málaga CF
- (Mali) Sissoko - Transferred to Liverpool
- (Spain) Xisco - Transferred to Real Betis
- (Spain) Palop - Transferred to Sevilla FC

== Villarreal CF ==
In:

- (Argentina) Guillermo Franco - Signed from Monterrey
- (Spain) Josemi - Signed from Liverpool
- (Uruguay) Sebastián Viera - Signed from Nacional de Montevideo
- (Argentina) Juan Román Riquelme - Signed from Barcelona
- (Argentina) Mariano Barbosa - Signed from Banfield
- (Italy) Alessio Tacchinardi - On loan from Juventus
- (Netherlands) Jan Kromkamp - Signed from AZ
- (Ecuador) Valencia - Signed from Club Deportivo El Nacional

Out:

- (Argentina) Lucho Figueroa - On loan to River Plate
- (Netherlands) Jan Kromkamp - Transferred to Liverpool
- (Ecuador) Valencia - On loan to Recreativo de Huelva
- (Spain) Tena - On loan to Poli Ejido
- (Spain) Cases - On loan to Terrassa FC
- (Spain) Pepe Reina - Transferred to Liverpool
- (Argentina) Battaglia - Transferred to Boca Juniors
- (Mozambique) Armando Sá - Transferred to RCD Espanyol

== Real Zaragoza ==
In:

- (Andorra) Albert Celades López- Signed from Real Madrid
- (Brazil) Ewerthon - Signed from Borussia Dortmund
- (Spain) Sergio García - Signed from Barcelona
- (Spain) César Sánchez - Signed from Real Madrid
- (Spain) Corona - Return from Poli Ejido
- (Spain) Valbuena - Return from Albacete Balompié
- (Argentina) Diego Milito - On loan from Genoa

Out

- (Spain) Camacho - Transferred to UE Lleida
- (Spain) Corona - Transferred to Albacete Balompié
- (Spain) Piti - On loan to Ciudad de Murcia
- (Spain) Jorge Pina - On loan to Málaga B
- (Spain) Dorado - On loan to UE Lleida
- (Spain) Javi Moreno - Transferred to Córdoba CF
- (Spain) Iban Espadas - Transferred to Ciudad de Murcia
- (Argentina) } Galletti - Transferred to Atlético Madrid
- (Spain) David Pirri - Transferred to Albacete Balompié
- (Spain) Soriano - Transferred to UD Almería
- (Spain) Villa - Transferred to Valencia CF
- (Spain) Granero - Transferred to Xerez CD
- (Spain) Luis Garcia - Transferred to Getafe CF
- (Serbia and Montenegro) Drulic - Transferred to Lokeren
- (Spain) Ruben Falcón - Transferred to Villanueva CF
- (Spain) César Láinez - Retired
