= 2005–06 La Liga =

75th season of La Liga

La Liga
- Season: 2005–06
- Dates: 27 August 2005 – 19 May 2006
- Champions: Barcelona; 18th title
- Relegated: Alavés; Cádiz; Málaga
- Champions League: Barcelona; Real Madrid; Valencia; Osasuna
- UEFA Cup: Sevilla; Celta Vigo; Espanyol (as Copa del Rey winners)
- Intertoto Cup: Villarreal
- Matches: 380
- Goals: 936 (2.46 per match)
- Top goalscorer: Samuel Eto'o (26 goals)
- Biggest home win: Málaga 5–0 Real Betis (23 October 2005); Barcelona 5–0 Real Sociedad (30 October 2005); Getafe 5–0 Espanyol (22 January 2006); Atlético Madrid 5–0 Málaga (25 February 2006); Espanyol 5–0 Sevilla (26 February 2006); Cádiz 5–0 Málaga (13 May 2006)
- Biggest away win: Osasuna 0–4 Getafe (2 April 2006); Cádiz 0–4 Sevilla (11 February 2006)
- Highest scoring: Valencia 5–3 Cádiz (2 April 2006)

The 2005–06 La Liga season was the 75th since its establishment. It began on 27 August 2005, and concluded on 19 May 2006; all top-flight European leagues ended earlier than the previous season due to the impending 2006 FIFA World Cup.

== Teams ==
Twenty teams competed in the league – the top seventeen teams from the previous season and the three teams promoted from the Segunda División. The promoted teams were Cádiz, Celta de Vigo and Alavés, returning to the top flight after an absence of twelve, one and two years respectively. They replaced Levante, Numancia (both teams relegated after a season's presence) and Albacete (ending their two-year top flight spell).

▲ Promoted to 2005–06 La Liga	▼ Relegated from 2004–05 La Liga
Cádiz; Celta de Vigo; Alavés	Levante; Numancia; Albacete

Location of teams in La Liga 2005–06

Team	Stadium	Capacity
Barcelona	Camp Nou	98,772
Real Madrid	Santiago Bernabéu	80,354
Espanyol	Estadi Olímpic Lluís Companys	55,926
Atlético Madrid	Vicente Calderón	55,005
Valencia	Mestalla	55,000
Real Betis	Manuel Ruiz de Lopera	52,132
Sevilla	Ramón Sánchez Pizjuán	45,500
Athletic Bilbao	San Mamés	39,750
Deportivo de La Coruña	Riazor	34,600
Real Zaragoza	La Romareda	34,596
Celta de Vigo*	Estadio Balaídos	32,500
Real Sociedad	Anoeta	32,200
Málaga	La Rosaleda	30,044
Mallorca	Son Moix	23,142
Villarreal	El Madrigal	23,000
Cádiz*	Ramón de Carranza	23,000
Racing de Santander	El Sardinero	22,400
Alavés*	Mendizorrotza	19,840
Osasuna	Estadio Reyno de Navarra	19,553
Getafe	Coliseum Alfonso Pérez	16,300

(*) Promoted from Segunda División.

=== Personnel and sponsorships ===
Team	Head Coach	Kit manufacturer	Shirt sponsor (front)	Shirt sponsor (back)	Shirt sponsor (sleeve)	Shorts sponsor
Alavés	(Argentina) Mario Luna	Umbro	Stevenson Electrodomésticos	Stevenson Electrodomésticos, Abba Hoteles/Grecogres	Caja Vital-Vital Kutxa, Álava.net, Rioja Grupo Inmobiliario	Abba Hoteles, Grecogres
Athletic Bilbao	(Spain) Javier Clemente	100% Athletic	Euskadi (in UEFA matches)	None	None	None
Atlético Madrid	(Spain) José Murcia	Nike	Columbia Pictures/Kia	Kyocera	None	AXN
Barcelona	(Netherlands) Frank Rijkaard	Nike	None	None	TV3	None
Betis	(Spain) Lorenzo Serra Ferrer	Kappa	Andalucía/Globet	Globet/Andalucía	None	Grupo Azabache
Cádiz	(Uruguay) Víctor Espárrago	Kelme	Caja San Fernando/Millan Chiclana/Andalucía	Diario de Cádiz	Diario AS	Mapfre-El Salvador, Visita El Salvador
Celta de Vigo	(Spain) Fernando Vázquez	Umbro	Citroën	None	None	Citroën
Deportivo	(Spain) Joaquín Caparrós	Joma	Fadesa	None	None	None
Espanyol	(Spain) Miguel Ángel Lotina	uhlsport	Grup Tarradellas	Interapuestas.com	TV3	Hoteles Hesperia
Getafe	(Germany) Bernd Schuster	Joma	Propietarios del Suelo de Getafe	Opción Centro de Ocio	Diezma Parquets y Tarimas	Neovision Ficciones
Málaga	(Spain) Manolo Hierro	Umbro	Unicaja/Andalucía	None	None	None
Mallorca	(Spain) Gregorio Manzano	Reial	Viajes Iberia	None	IB3	Illes Balears
Osasuna	(Mexico) Javier Aguirre	Astore	Caja Navarra/Reyno de Navarra (in UEFA matches)	None	Caja Navarra	None
Racing Santander	(Spain) Nando Yosu	Joma	Cantabria 2006: Liébana Tierra de Júbilo	Santander 250	Cantabria	Cantabria
Real Madrid	(Spain) Juan Ramón López Caro	Adidas	Siemens	None	None	None
Real Sociedad	(Spain) José Mari Bakero	Astore	FIATC Seguros	NGS Europe	NGS Europe	FIATC Seguros, NGS Europe
Sevilla	(Spain) Juande Ramos	Joma	Stevenson Electrodomésticos	Andalucía	Andalucía	www.sevillafc.es
Valencia	(Spain) Quique Sánchez Flores	Nike	Toyota/Toyota Aygo	None	Canal Nou	None
Villarreal	(Chile) Manuel Pellegrini	Puma	Aeroport Castelló	Armiñana Promociones Inmobiliarias	Canal Nou	None
Zaragoza	(Spain) Víctor Muñoz	Lotto	Expo Zaragoza 2008 Telefónica	None	None	None

== League table ==
Pos	Team	Pld	W	D	L	GF	GA	GD	Pts	Qualification or relegation
1	Barcelona (C)	38	25	7	6	80	35	+45	82	Qualification for the Champions League group stage
2	Real Madrid	38	20	10	8	70	40	+30	70	Qualification for the Champions League group stage
3	Valencia	38	19	12	7	58	33	+25	69	Qualification for the Champions League third qualifying round
4	Osasuna	38	21	5	12	49	43	+6	68	Qualification for the Champions League third qualifying round
5	Sevilla	38	20	8	10	54	39	+15	68	Qualification for the UEFA Cup first round
6	Celta Vigo	38	20	4	14	45	33	+12	64	Qualification for the UEFA Cup first round
7	Villarreal	38	14	15	9	50	39	+11	57	Qualification for the Intertoto Cup third round
8	Deportivo La Coruña	38	15	10	13	47	45	+2	55	
9	Getafe	38	15	9	14	54	49	+5	54	
10	Atlético Madrid	38	13	13	12	45	37	+8	52	
11	Zaragoza	38	10	16	12	46	51	−5	46	
12	Athletic Bilbao	38	11	12	15	40	46	−6	45	
13	Mallorca	38	10	13	15	37	51	−14	43	
14	Real Betis	38	10	12	16	34	51	−17	42	
15	Espanyol	38	10	11	17	36	56	−20	41	Qualification for the UEFA Cup first round (Note: Espanyol qualified for the UEFA Cup first round as the 2005–06 Copa del Rey winners.)
16	Real Sociedad	38	11	7	20	48	65	−17	40	
17	Racing Santander	38	9	13	16	36	49	−13	40	
18	Alavés (R)	38	9	12	17	35	54	−19	39	Relegation to the Segunda División
19	Cádiz (R)	38	8	12	18	36	52	−16	36	Relegation to the Segunda División
20	Málaga (R)	38	5	9	24	36	68	−32	24	Relegation to the Segunda División

Source: LFP
Rules for classification: 1st points; 2nd head-to-head points; 3rd head-to-head goal difference; 4th head-to-head goals scored; 5th goal difference; 6th number of goals scored; 7th Fair-play points
(C) Champions; (R) Relegated

== Results ==
Home \ Away	ATH	ATM	FCB	BET	CÁD	CEL	ALV	RCD	ESP	GET	MCF	MLL	OSA	RAC	RMA	RSO	SFC	VCF	VIL	ZAR
Athletic Bilbao		1–1	3–1	2–0	1–0	1–1	0–2	1–2	1–1	1–0	1–2	1–1	1–0	0–0	0–2	3–0	0–1	0–3	1–1	1–0
Atlético Madrid	1–0		2–1	1–1	3–0	0–3	1–1	3–2	1–1	0–1	5–0	0–1	0–1	2–1	0–3	1–0	0–1	0–0	1–1	0–0
Barcelona	2–1	1–3		5–1	1–0	2–0	2–0	3–2	2–0	3–1	2–0	2–0	3–0	4–1	1–1	5–0	2–1	2–2	1–0	2–2
Betis	1–1	1–0	1–4		1–1	0–2	3–0	0–1	0–0	1–0	1–1	2–1	1–0	1–0	0–2	2–0	2–1	0–2	2–3	0–0
Cádiz	1–0	1–1	1–3	1–1		1–1	0–0	1–1	2–0	1–0	5–0	1–2	1–3	1–1	1–2	2–2	0–4	0–1	1–1	1–2
Celta de Vigo	0–1	2–1	0–1	2–1	2–0		2–1	0–3	1–0	1–0	2–0	2–0	2–0	0–1	1–2	1–0	2–1	0–1	1–0	4–0
Alavés	0–0	0–1	0–0	2–0	0–0	1–0		1–0	1–1	3–4	3–2	0–3	1–2	2–2	0–3	3–1	2–1	0–1	1–1	0–2
Deportivo La Coruña	1–2	1–0	3–3	1–1	1–0	0–2	0–2		1–2	1–0	2–1	2–2	0–1	2–0	3–1	0–1	0–0	0–1	0–2	1–1
Espanyol	1–1	1–1	1–2	2–0	0–2	2–0	0–0	1–2		0–2	3–1	2–0	2–4	0–2	1–0	1–0	5–0	1–3	1–2	2–2
Getafe	1–1	0–3	1–3	1–0	3–1	1–1	2–2	1–2	5–0		3–2	1–1	0–0	1–2	1–1	2–1	1–0	2–1	1–1	5–2
Málaga	2–1	0–2	0–0	5–0	0–2	0–2	0–0	1–1	1–2	1–2		0–2	1–2	2–3	0–2	3–1	0–2	0–0	0–0	0–1
Mallorca	0–1	2–2	0–3	1–1	1–0	1–0	0–0	0–1	0–0	1–1	1–4		0–1	0–0	2–1	5–2	1–1	2–1	1–1	3–1
Osasuna	3–2	2–1	2–1	0–2	2–0	2–0	3–2	1–2	2–0	0–4	1–1	1–0		1–1	0–1	2–0	1–0	2–1	2–1	1–1
Racing Santander	0–1	0–1	2–2	1–1	0–1	0–1	1–2	0–3	1–0	1–3	1–1	0–0	2–1		2–3	2–2	2–3	2–1	1–0	0–0
Real Madrid	3–1	2–1	0–3	0–0	3–1	2–3	3–0	4–0	4–0	1–0	2–1	4–0	1–1	1–2		1–1	4–2	1–2	3–3	1–0
Real Sociedad	3–3	3–2	0–2	1–1	2–0	2–2	2–1	2–0	0–1	3–0	3–0	2–1	1–2	1–0	2–2		1–2	1–2	1–3	1–3
Sevilla	2–1	0–0	3–2	1–0	0–0	1–0	2–0	0–2	1–1	3–0	3–1	1–1	0–1	1–0	4–3	3–2		1–0	2–0	1–1
Valencia	1–1	1–1	1–0	1–0	5–3	2–0	3–0	2–2	4–0	1–1	2–1	3–0	2–0	1–1	0–0	2–1	0–2		1–1	2–2
Villarreal	3–1	1–1	0–2	1–2	1–1	1–2	3–2	1–1	4–0	2–1	2–1	3–0	2–1	2–0	0–0	0–2	1–1	1–0		0–0
Zaragoza	3–2	0–2	0–2	4–3	1–2	1–0	3–0	1–1	1–1	1–2	1–1	3–1	3–1	1–1	1–1	0–1	0–2	2–2	0–1	

Source: LFP (in Spanish)
Legend: Blue = home team win; Yellow = draw; Red = away team win.

== Overall ==
- Most wins - Barcelona (25)
- Fewest wins - Málaga (5)
- Most draws - Zaragoza (16)
- Fewest draws - Celta de Vigo (4)
- Most losses - Málaga (24)
- Fewest losses - Barcelona (6)
- Most goals scored - Barcelona (80)
- Fewest goals scored - Betis (34)
- Most goals conceded - Málaga (68)
- Fewest goals conceded - Celta de Vigo and Valencia (33)

== Awards ==
=== Annual awards ===
Don Balón Annual Awards
Award	Winner	Club
Best Team	Barcelona	—
Best Player	(Brazil) Ronaldinho	Barcelona
Best Spanish Player	(Spain) David Villa	Valencia
Best Foreign Player	(Brazil) Ronaldinho	Barcelona
Best Passer	(Brazil) Ronaldinho	Barcelona
Best Veteran	(Spain) Santiago Cañizares	Valencia
Revelation Player	(Spain) Raúl Albiol	Valencia
Best Manager	(Netherlands) Frank Rijkaard	Barcelona
Best Referee	(Spain) Manuel Enrique Mejuto González	—
Best Director	(Spain) Fernando Roig	Villarreal

=== Team of the Season ===

Don Balón Team of the Season

Don Balón Team of the Season
Goalkeeper	(Spain) Santiago Cañizares (Valencia)			
Defenders	(Brazil) Dani Alves (Sevilla)	(Spain) Carles Puyol (Barcelona)	(Spain) Raúl Albiol (Valencia)	(Argentina) Mariano Pernía (Getafe)
Midfielders	(Argentina) Juan Román Riquelme (Villarreal)	(Spain) Diego Rivas (Real Sociedad)	(Brazil) Ronaldinho (Barcelona)	(Spain) Jaime Gavilán (Getafe)
Forwards	(Cameroon) Samuel Eto'o (Barcelona)		(Spain) David Villa (Valencia)	

=== Pichichi Trophy ===
The Pichichi Trophy is awarded to the player who scores the most goals in a season.

Rank	Player	Club	Goals
1	(Cameroon) Samuel Eto'o	Barcelona	26
2	(Spain) David Villa	Valencia	25
3	(Brazil) Ronaldinho	Barcelona	17
4	(Argentina) Diego Milito	Zaragoza	15
5	(Brazil) Ronaldo	Real Madrid	14
6	(Brazil) Fernando Baiano	Celta Vigo	13
6	(Spain) Fernando Torres	Atlético Madrid	13
8	(Brazil) Éwerthon	Zaragoza	12
8	(Argentina) Juan Román Riquelme	Villarreal	12

=== Zamora Trophy ===
The Ricardo Zamora Trophy is awarded to the goalkeeper with the lowest ratio of goals conceded to matches played.

Rank	Player	Club	Goals against	Matches	Average
1	(Spain) José Manuel Pinto	Celta Vigo	28	37	0.76
2	(Spain) Santiago Cañizares	Valencia	29	36	0.81
3	(Spain) Víctor Valdés	Barcelona	29	35	0.83
4	(Argentina) Leo Franco	Atlético Madrid	31	34	0.91
5	(Spain) Iker Casillas	Real Madrid	38	37	1.03
5	(Spain) Andrés Palop	Sevilla	37	36	1.03
5	(Uruguay) Sebastián Viera	Villarreal	30	29	1.03
8	(Spain) Toni Prats	Mallorca	36	31	1.16
9	(Spain) Ricardo	Osasuna	35	30	1.17
10	(Spain) José Francisco Molina	Deportivo La Coruña	45	38	1.18

=== Fair Play award ===
Rank	Club	Points
1	(Catalonia) Barcelona	86
2	(Valencian Community) Valencia	98
3	(Galicia (Spain)) Celta Vigo	99
4	(Basque Country (autonomous community)) Real Sociedad	106
5	(Basque Country (autonomous community)) Alavés	114
6	(Valencian Community) Villarreal	116
7	(Catalonia) Espanyol	124
7	(Balearic Islands) Mallorca	124
9	(Andalusia) Cádiz	125
10	(Basque Country (autonomous community)) Athletic Bilbao	128
11	(Community of Madrid) Getafe	130
12	(Galicia (Spain)) Deportivo La Coruña	131
12	(Community of Madrid) Real Madrid	131
14	(Aragon) Zaragoza	136
15	(Andalusia) Sevilla	163
16	(Navarre) Osasuna	171
16	(Cantabria) Racing Santander	171
18	(Andalusia) Málaga	179
19	(Andalusia) Real Betis	183
20	(Community of Madrid) Atlético Madrid	187

- Source: Guia As de La Liga 2006–07, p. 144 (sports magazine)

=== Pedro Zaballa award ===
Cádiz supporters

=== Hat-tricks ===
Player	Club	Against	Result	Date
(Venezuela) Juan Arango	Mallorca	Real Sociedad	5–2 (H)	17 September 2005
(Brazil) Nenê	Alavés	Getafe	3–4 (H)	18 September 2005
(France) Zinedine Zidane	Real Madrid	Sevilla	4–2 (H)	15 January 2006
(Spain) Dani	Real Betis	Zaragoza	3–4 (A)	5 February 2006
(Spain) Luis García	Espanyol	Sevilla	5–0 (H)	26 February 2006
(Spain) David Villa	Valencia	Athletic Bilbao	3–0 (A)	23 April 2006

== Attendances ==
#	Club	Avg. attendance	% change	Highest
1	FC Barcelona	73,225	-0.2%	98,295
2	Real Madrid	71,544	-0.5%	80,000
3	Valencia CF	43,105	1.6%	51,000
4	Sevilla FC	40,247	1.8%	45,000
5	Atlético de Madrid	38,684	-9.1%	60,000
6	Real Betis	38,421	15.5%	45,000
7	Athletic Club	36,895	13.8%	40,000
8	Real Zaragoza	28,158	-9.0%	32,000
9	Real Sociedad	22,524	6.8%	38,472
10	RCD Espanyol	22,337	-7.2%	48,950
11	Málaga CF	19,316	-12.4%	25,000
12	Deportivo de La Coruña	19,105	-11.9%	34,000
13	Cádiz CF	18,505	20.8%	22,087
14	Villarreal CF	18,487	1.5%	23,000
15	Celta de Vigo	16,947	35.3%	30,000
16	CA Osasuna	16,063	7.3%	19,517
17	RCD Mallorca	15,847	2.9%	20,500
18	Racing de Santander	14,720	9.4%	20,670
19	Deportivo Alavés	13,691	19.3%	17,047
20	Getafe CF	12,763	-0.4%	15,500

== See also ==
- List of transfers of La Liga – 2005-06 season
- 2005–06 Segunda División
- 2005–06 Copa del Rey
