= Secundio Felgueroso =

Spanish businessman, footballer, and sports leader (1901–1983)

Secundino Felgueroso
Personal information
- Full name: Secundino Felgueroso Fernández-Nespral
- Date of birth: 5 October 1901
- Place of birth: Pola de Laviana, Spain
- Date of death: 2 May 1983 (aged 81)
- Place of death: Gijón, Spain
- Position: Forward

Senior career*
| Years | Team | Apps | (Gls) |
| 1915–1916 | Athletic Club de Madrid | | |
| 1916–1917 | Racing de Santander | | |

International career
| 1917 | Cantabric | 2 | (1) |
President of Sporting de Gijón
In office 1940–1945
| Preceded by | Pedro González del Río |
| Succeeded by | Juan Velasco Nespral |
President of Sporting de Gijón
In office 1948–1949
| Preceded by | José María Fernández Álvarez |
| Succeeded by | Paulino Antón Trespalacios |
- * Club domestic league appearances and goals

Secundino Felgueroso Fernández-Nespral (5 October 1901 – 2 May 1983), sometimes misspelled as Secundio Felgueroso, was a Spanish enterprising businessman in the mining and steel industry who served as a councilor and deputy mayor of the Gijón City Council.

In his youth, he briefly played football for Atlético Madrid in the mid-1910s, but he his best known for his work Sporting de Gijón, which he presided on two occasions, first from 1940 until 1945, and again in 1948–49.

== Early and personal life ==
Secundino Felgueroso was born on 5 October 1901 in the Asturias town of Pola de Laviana, as the first son and fourth child of Celsa Fernández-Nespral Hevia (1878–1938) and Secundino Felgueroso González (1872–1952).

He married twice: Luisa Ruiz de la Pena Cuenca (1903–1969), with whom he had two children, and María Josefa Fernández Liébana.

== Playing career ==
Fernández began his football career at Athletic Madrid in 1915, aged only 13. That year, he signed for Racing de Santander, during which time he was summoned to play for the Cantabric national team in the 1917 Prince of Asturias Cup, an inter-regional competition organized by the RFEF. In the tournament, he played alongside Manuel Argüelles and the Villaverde brothers, Fernando and Senén, and scored one goal in a 3–2 loss to the Centro team (a Castile/Madrid XI).

== Life in Gijón ==
In the early 1920s, his father, Secundino, together with his siblings, coal miners from the Nalón valley, completed a foreman's course in Mieres and began buying pits, including in Langreo and then in Gijón. They soon made a fortune from the mining business, which gradually increased after the creation of a railway that linked Langreo with El Musel. The Felgueroso family, which is considered one of the most influential families of the Asturian industrialization period, eventually settled in Gijón. Naturally, Felgueroso followed in his family's footsteps, becoming an enterprising businessman in the mining and steel industry of Gijón.

In 1940, the 38-year-old Felgueroso was appointed as the new president of Sporting de Gijón by government officials in Asturias. Under his leadership, the club won the 1943–44 Segunda División, thus achieving the first of its six promotions to the top flight. Having been replaced by Juan Velasco Nespral in 1945, he returned to the club's presidency in 1948, a position that he held for just one year, until 1949, when he was replaced by Paulino Antón Trespalacios.

Felgueroso also presided over the Gijón Port Board, a position that he held for 13 years, from 10 December 1964 until 1 October 1977, becoming the president of the Gijón-Musel Port Board in 1968. In 1948, Felgueroso became one of the three advisors of the Provincial Council's transport service, and he later served as a councilor and deputy mayor of the Gijón City Council.

== Death and legacy ==
In 1966, Felgueroso was named an adopted son of Gijón, where he died on 2 May 1983, at the age of 81. One of his granddaughters, Paz Fernández Felgueroso, was the mayor of Gijón for 12 years, from 1999 to 2011.
