= Manolo Higuera =

Spanish footballer

Personal information
- Full name: Manuel Higuera Sancho
- Date of birth: 14 March 1964 (age 62)
- Place of birth: Santander, Spain
- Height: 1.68 m (5 ft 6 in)
- Position: Forward

Youth career
- Racing Santander

Senior career*
| Years | Team | Apps | (Gls) |
- Racing B
| 1984–1988 | Racing Santander | 18 | (0) |
- * Club domestic league appearances and goals

Manuel 'Manolo' Higuera Sancho (born 14 March 1964) is a Spanish retired footballer who played as a forward, and is the president of Racing de Santander.

== Club career ==
Born in Santander, Cantabria, Higuera graduated with Racing de Santander's youth setup. He made his first team – and La Liga – debut on 9 September 1984, starting in a 0–1 away loss against Real Valladolid.

Higuera left the Verdiblancos in 1988, after appearing rarely.

== Post-retirement ==
After retiring Higuera worked as an advocate, being also a businessman. On 14 June 2015 he succeeded Juan Antonio Sañudo as club chairman, as Racing was relegated back to Segunda División B after only one year.

In the summer of 2023, he became the club's president again, purchasing 74% of the shareholding package together with Sebastian Ceria.
