= Juan Antonio Sañudo =

Spanish footballer

Personal information
- Full name: Juan Antonio Sañudo Herrero
- Date of birth: 13 June 1956 (age 70)
- Place of birth: Serdio, Spain
- Height: 1.79 m (5 ft 10 1/2 in)
- Position: Centre-back

Youth career
- 1971–1975: Barquereño

Senior career*
Years	Team	Apps	(Gls)
1975–1976	Barquereño		
1976–1978	Rayo Cantabria		
1978–1987	Racing Santander	262	(12)
1987–1992	Oviedo	153	(3)
1992–1993	Racing Santander	38	(0)
- * Club domestic league appearances and goals

Juan Antonio 'Tuto' Sañudo Herrero (born 13 June 1956) is a Spanish former professional footballer who played as a central defender.

== Playing career ==
Born in the village of Serdio in Val de San Vicente, Sañudo played 304 La Liga matches over the course of ten seasons, with Racing de Santander and Real Oviedo. He scored 12 goals for the former, which he reached in 1978 from neighbouring Deportivo Rayo Cantabria, and made his debut in the Spanish top flight on 7 January 1979 in a 3–1 home win against Valencia CF. 21 days later, also in the league, he grabbed a brace to help the hosts defeat FC Barcelona 2–1, in an eventual relegation-ending season.

Sañudo was voted the league's best defender for the 1985–86 campaign, helping Racing to the 12th position. He played his only game in the UEFA Cup on 3 October 1991 at the age of 35, as Asturias's Oviedo lost 3–1 at Genoa CFC and 3–2 on aggregate in the first round.

Sañudo competed in the Segunda División with both his main clubs, and was at one time Racing's most-capped player in the top division, but was later surpassed by Pedro Munitis and José María Ceballos. He retired at the end of 1992–93 at the age of 37, after totalling 3,151 minutes of action to help the Cantabrians to a third promotion to the main tier.

== Post-retirement ==
After retiring, Sañudo worked as an insurance agent and in lodging, and he also provided commentary for Racing Santander's matches at Cadena COPE.

On 31 January 2014, Sañudo succeeded Ángel Lavín as chairman as Racing was immersed in a severe institucional and financial crisis. On 14 June of the following year, he was replaced by Manolo Higuera, another former footballer of the club.
