= Óscar (footballer, born 1903) =

Spanish footballer

Personal information
- Full name: Óscar Rodríguez López
- Date of birth: 10 June 1903
- Place of birth: Avilés, Asturias, Spain
- Date of death: 21 June 1976 (aged 73)
- Position: Center-forward

Senior career*
| Years | Team | Apps | (Gls) |
| 1920–1940 | Racing de Santander | 211 | (236) |
| 1940–1941 | UD Salamanca | 6 | (3) |

International career
| 1924–1925 | Cantabria | 5 | (+2) |
| 1925–1927 | Spain | 2 | (1) |
| 1927 | Spain B | 1 | (0) |
- * Club domestic league appearances and goals

Óscar Rodríguez López (10 June 1903 in Avilés – 21 June 1976), simply known as Óscar, was a Spanish footballer who played as a center-forward. Despite being deaf, he developed his entire football career at Racing de Santander, a team of which he is the all-time top scorer.

== Club career ==
The son of a fisherman from Vigo and a woman from Avilés, he moved to Santander when he was sixteen years old, and there he began his career with Racing de Santander in 1920, at the age of 17, going on to play for them for the next two decades. A center-forward with a powerful shot, fast and very combative, he is considered by many to be the most important finisher in the history of Racing, with a total of 236 goals in just 211 official matches. In 1929 his goals were decisive in the qualifying phase to decide the tenth team that would participate in the first-ever National championship season in 1929. He was the driving force behind Santander in the 1920s and 1930s, helping the club win 13 Cantabrian Championships. His goals played a pivotal role in helping the club finish runner-up in the 1930–31 La Liga season.

Besides his natural ability to put the ball in the back of the net, he also fell in love with his soon-to-be wife after dedicating a goal to her in a game in 1925, with whom he married a few months later. The epitaph on his tomb still reads: "Here lies, eternally in love, the greatest goalscorer of Real Racing Club".

== International career ==
Being a player of Racing de Santander, he was eligible to play for the Cantabria national team, and he was one of the eleven footballers that played in the team's first-ever game on 9 March 1924, a 3–0 win over Aragon, and he was also the first professional football player registered in Cantabria after the admission of professionalism in 1926. Óscar scored twice in a 3–3 draw with Asturias on 3 May 1925.

Óscar earned two international caps for the Spain national team, making his debut on 17 May 1925 in a friendly against Portugal which ended in a 2-0 win. He had to wait two years for his second and last cap, which was held at El Sardinero on 17 April 1927 against Switzerland, and Óscar scored the only goal of the game in a 1–0 win. He also earned a cap for the Spanish B team on 29 May 1927, in a friendly against the Portugal A side, which ended in a 2-0 win.

== Honours ==
=== International ===
Racing de Santander

- Cantabrian Championship
  - Champions (13): 1922–23, 1923–24, 1924–25, 1925–26, 1926–27, 1927–28, 1928–29, 1929–30, 1930–31, 1932–33, 1933–34, 1938–39, 1939–40
- La Liga:
  - Runners-up (1): 1930–31
