= Pablo Casar =

Spanish footballer (born 1978)

Personal information
- Full name: Pablo Casar Bustillo
- Date of birth: 17 September 1978 (age 48)
- Place of birth: Cabezón de la Sal, Spain
- Height: 1.85 m (6 ft 1 in)
- Position: Centre back

Youth career
- 1995–1997: Atlético Perines

Senior career*
Years	Team	Apps	(Gls)
1997–2001	Racing B	57	(0)
1999–2005	Racing Santander	58	(4)
2006	Valladolid	8	(0)
2006–2009	Alavés	82	(8)
2009–2010	Panthrakikos	2	(0)
Total		207	(12)

International career
1996	Spain U18	3	(0)
- * Club domestic league appearances and goals

Pablo Casar Bustillo (born 17 September 1978) is a Spanish retired footballer who played as a central defender.

== Football career ==
Born in Cabezón de la Sal, Cantabria, Casar spent most of his professional career with local Racing de Santander, making his debuts as a senior with the reserves in the lower leagues. He played his first game in La Liga on 19 June 1999, coming on as a second-half substitute in a 0–2 home loss against Real Valladolid.

Casar's best input with his main club occurred in the 2003–04 season, when he scored one goal while starting in all his 32 appearances to help the side narrowly avoid relegation after finishing in 17th position. Released in January 2006 he resumed his career in Segunda División, representing Valladolid and Deportivo Alavés; in the 2009–10 campaign he played with Panthrakikos F.C. from Greece, after which he retired at the age of 31.
