= Oussama Souaidy =

Moroccan footballer (born 1981)

Personal information
- Full name: Oussama Souaidy
- Date of birth: 25 August 1981 (age 45)
- Place of birth: Cahors, France
- Height: 1.78 m (5 ft 10 in)
- Position: Defensive midfielder

Senior career*
Years	Team	Apps	(Gls)
2000–2002	Toulouse	2	(0)
2002–2003	Noja	26	(0)
2003–2005	Mallorca B	49	(0)
2005–2006	Estoril	21	(2)
2006–2007	Gramenet	12	(0)
2007–2008	Fundación Logroñés		
2008–2009	Mirandés		
2009–2010	Alfaro		
2010–2011	Tudelano		

International career
2002	Morocco	1	(0)
- * Club domestic league appearances and goals

Oussama Souaidy (born 25 August 1981) is a retired footballer who played mainly as a defensive midfielder. Born in France, he represented Morocco at international level.

== Club career ==
Born in Cahors, France, Souaidy made two Ligue 1 appearances for FC Toulouse in the 2000–01 season, with the club being relegated straight to the Championnat National due to irregularities. After one further campaign he moved to Spain, where he would remain until his retirement nine years later (with the exception of 2005–06 which was spent in Portugal with G.D. Estoril Praia, in the second division).

In the former country, Souaidy never played in higher than Segunda División B, and spent his final five seasons in Tercera División. He represented SD Noja, RCD Mallorca B, UDA Gramenet, AD Fundación Logroñés, CD Mirandés, CD Alfaro and CD Tudelano, retiring in June 2011 at nearly 30 years of age.

== International career ==
Souaidy won one cap for Morocco, in 2002. Additionally, he was part of the squad that appeared at the 2004 Summer Olympics in Athens, appearing in all the matches as the national team exited in the group stage with a total of four points.
