= Iñaki Bollaín =

Spanish footballer

Personal information
- Full name: José Ignacio Bollaín Ochoa
- Date of birth: 5 October 1974 (age 52)
- Place of birth: Santander, Spain
- Height: 1.76 m (5 ft 9 1/2 in)
- Position: Right back

Team information
- Current team: Noja

Youth career
- Laredo

Senior career*
Years	Team	Apps	(Gls)
1992–1993	Laredo		
1993–1994	Gimnástica	24	(1)
1994–1997	Racing Santander	79	(3)
1997–1999	Levante	32	(2)
1999	Jerez	16	(0)
1999–2000	Noja		
2000	Novelda	20	(0)
2000–2003	Burgos	108	(14)
2003–2004	Palencia	34	(2)
2004–2005	Laredo		
2005	Sangonera	23	(5)
2005–2007	Granada	63	(3)
2007–2009	Roquetas	52	(2)
2009	Burgos		
2009–	Noja	127	(2)
- * Club domestic league appearances and goals as of 11 December 2013

José Ignacio Bollaín Ochoa (born 6 October 1974), commonly known as Iñaki, is a Spanish former footballer who played as a right defender.

== Football career ==
Born in Santander, Cantabria, Iñaki made his senior debuts in the 1992–93 season with local CD Laredo, in Tercera División. One year later he first arrived in Segunda División B, signing with neighbouring Gimnástica de Torrelavega.

In the 1994 summer, Iñaki joined Racing de Santander: on 4 September he appeared in his first La Liga game, playing the last 20 minutes in a 0–0 home draw against Real Valladolid. On 8 January of the following year he scored his first goal in the top flight, netting the third in a 3–2 home win over Valencia CF.

In December 1997 Iñaki moved to Levante UD, in Segunda División. In his first year he played 20 matches but suffered team relegation, and, after leaving in the 1999 summer, resumed his career in the third and fourth levels, representing Jerez CF, SD Noja (two stints), Novelda CF, Burgos CF (two spells), CF Palencia, Laredo, Sangonera Atlético CF, Granada CF and CD Roquetas; with the last two clubs he achieved promotion to division three in 2006 and 2008, respectively.
