= 1972–73 Segunda División =

42nd season of the second-tier football league in Spain

Segunda División
- Season: 1972–73
- Dates: 2 September 1972 – 17 June 1973
- Champions: Real Murcia (5th title)
- Promoted: Elche; Racing de Santander
- Relegated: Logroñés; Pontevedra; Cultural Leonesa; Mestalla
- Matches: 380
- Goals: 853 (2.24 per match)
- Top goalscorer: Antonio Illán (19 goals)

The 1972–73 Segunda División season saw 20 teams participate in the second flight Spanish league. Real Murcia won the league. Real Murcia, Elche CF and Racing de Santander were promoted to Primera División. CD Logroñés, Pontevedra CF, Cultural Leonesa and CD Mestalla were relegated to Tercera División.

== Teams ==
Location of teams in Segunda División 1972-73
Canary Islands

Club	City	Stadium
Baracaldo	Barakaldo	Lasesarre
Cádiz	Cádiz	Ramón de Carranza
Córdoba	Córdoba	El Árcangel
Cultural Leonesa	León	Antonio Amilivia
Elche	Elche	Altabix
Gimnástico de Tarragona	Tarragona	José Luis Calderón
Hércules	Alicante	La Viña
Logroñés	Logroño	Las Gaunas
Mallorca	Palma de Mallorca	Luis Sitjar
Mestalla	Valencia	Mestalla
Murcia	Murcia	La Condomina
Osasuna	Pamplona	El Sadar
Pontevedra	Pontevedra	Pasarón
Racing de Santander	Santander	El Sardinero
Rayo Vallecano	Madrid	Vallehermoso
Sabadell	Sabadell	Nova Creu Alta
San Andrés	Barcelona	Calle Santa Coloma
Sevilla	Seville	Ramón Sánchez Pizjuán
Tenerife	Santa Cruz de Tenerife	Heliodoro Rodríguez López
Real Valladolid	Valladolid	José Zorrilla

== Final table ==
Pos	Team	Pld	W	D	L	GF	GA	GD	Pts	Promotion or relegation
1	Real Murcia	38	24	6	8	61	26	+35	54	Promoted to Primera División
2	Elche CF	38	20	10	8	48	28	+20	50	Promoted to Primera División
3	Racing de Santander	38	20	8	10	41	37	+4	48	Promoted to Primera División
4	Sevilla CF	38	16	12	10	45	29	+16	44	
5	Real Valladolid	38	15	12	11	42	32	+10	42	
6	CD San Andrés	38	14	12	12	49	51	−2	40	
7	Cádiz CF	38	14	11	13	51	45	+6	39	
8	Baracaldo CF	38	14	11	13	43	48	−5	39	
9	Hércules CF	38	16	7	15	42	39	+3	39	
10	RCD Mallorca	38	15	9	14	37	33	+4	39	
11	Rayo Vallecano	38	15	7	16	58	50	+8	37	
12	CD Sabadell	38	12	12	14	45	50	−5	36	
13	Córdoba CF	38	13	9	16	45	46	−1	35	Relegation playoff
14	CD Tenerife	38	13	9	16	36	38	−2	35	Relegation playoff
15	CA Osasuna	38	13	8	17	32	49	−17	34	Relegation playoff
16	Gimnástico de Tarragona	38	12	9	17	35	48	−13	33	Relegation playoff
17	CD Logroñés	38	8	14	16	40	48	−8	30	Relegated to Tercera División
18	Pontevedra CF	38	10	10	18	37	50	−13	30	Relegated to Tercera División
19	Cultural Leonesa	38	10	10	18	37	53	−16	30	Relegated to Tercera División
20	CD Mestalla	38	6	14	18	29	53	−24	26	Relegated to Tercera División

Source: BDFutbol

== Results ==
Home \ Away	BAC	CÁD	CÓR	CUL	ELC	GIM	HÉR	LOG	MLL	MES	MUR	OSA	PON	RAC	RAY	SAB	SAN	SEV	TEN	VLD
Baracaldo	—	1–1	3–2	1–2	0–0	3–0	2–0	2–1	1–0	4–2	0–1	3–0	3–0	0–0	2–2	1–0	1–1	2–1	1–1	2–0
Cádiz	3–1	—	1–1	1–0	1–1	1–1	2–1	3–2	2–0	1–1	0–1	1–0	2–0	0–1	2–3	3–1	6–0	1–1	0–0	3–2
Córdoba	2–0	2–0	—	2–2	1–2	1–0	4–2	2–1	2–0	0–0	1–0	4–0	2–1	1–2	2–0	0–0	4–0	0–0	1–0	2–3
Cultural Leonesa	1–1	1–1	3–0	—	0–0	2–0	1–4	3–2	0–0	2–1	1–3	1–0	1–1	1–2	3–1	0–0	1–2	1–2	0–0	2–1
Elche	1–0	3–0	1–0	3–2	—	1–0	3–0	3–1	3–1	4–1	1–1	1–0	2–0	1–1	0–1	1–0	2–0	1–0	1–0	1–2
Gimnástico Tarragona	2–0	2–1	1–1	4–0	1–1	—	1–0	2–2	0–1	2–0	0–1	1–0	0–0	1–0	2–0	2–1	2–1	0–1	0–0	2–1
Hércules	2–0	0–1	1–0	3–1	2–1	0–0	—	1–0	2–0	1–0	0–1	2–0	2–1	5–2	1–1	0–0	1–0	1–1	3–1	1–0
Logroñés	1–1	3–3	4–0	1–0	0–1	1–1	1–2	—	1–0	1–1	0–0	2–1	0–0	0–3	2–0	1–1	1–3	3–1	3–0	1–2
Mallorca	1–1	0–0	2–0	2–0	2–2	2–0	1–0	0–0	—	1–1	1–0	1–0	0–1	0–0	2–1	3–0	2–1	1–1	3–0	0–1
Mestalla	0–1	1–1	0–1	1–2	2–3	3–1	0–1	1–1	1–3	—	0–0	0–1	1–0	2–1	2–1	2–1	1–1	0–0	2–1	0–0
Murcia	6–0	2–1	1–0	0–1	2–0	3–1	2–0	1–0	1–0	5–0	—	1–0	3–0	4–1	2–1	5–2	1–0	2–0	3–0	2–1
Osasuna	1–0	1–0	2–2	1–0	1–0	2–1	1–0	1–0	1–1	1–0	1–0	—	2–0	0–1	4–2	1–3	1–1	1–1	1–1	0–0
Pontevedra	0–2	2–1	0–0	0–0	0–2	3–0	1–1	1–1	1–3	2–0	0–1	1–2	—	4–0	2–1	0–0	0–0	2–0	2–1	3–0
Racing Santander	2–1	1–0	1–0	2–1	0–0	1–1	1–0	3–0	1–0	2–0	0–0	1–0	1–0	—	2–1	2–0	1–1	1–0	2–1	2–0
Rayo Vallecano	2–2	1–2	3–0	1–1	0–1	4–0	2–1	1–0	2–1	1–1	2–0	7–0	2–2	2–0	—	3–0	4–1	2–1	2–0	0–2
Sabadell	3–0	3–1	3–3	2–0	1–0	3–2	0–0	0–2	0–1	2–1	3–3	2–1	3–1	3–0	1–1	—	1–1	0–1	1–0	1–0
San Andrés	3–0	2–4	1–0	1–0	3–1	1–2	2–1	1–1	0–1	0–0	3–2	3–3	2–3	2–0	2–0	4–1	—	1–0	1–0	2–2
Sevilla	0–1	2–0	3–1	2–0	2–0	2–0	1–0	0–0	2–0	3–0	1–1	1–1	5–2	1–0	3–0	2–1	0–0	—	3–0	0–0
Tenerife	0–0	0–1	1–0	4–1	0–0	1–0	3–0	3–0	1–0	1–1	2–0	2–0	3–1	4–1	1–0	1–1	0–1	2–0	—	1–0
Valladolid	4–0	1–0	2–1	1–0	0–0	3–0	1–1	0–0	3–1	0–0	2–0	2–0	1–0	0–0	0–1	1–1	1–1	1–1	2–0	—

Source: BDFutbol
Legend: Blue = home team win; Yellow = draw; Red = away team win.

== Relegation playoff ==
Home Matches:
CD Tenerife	6-2	CD Ensidesa
CA Osasuna	2-0	CD Cartagena
Córdoba CF	3-0	Gerona CF
Gimnástico de Tarragona	4-0	Atlético Madrileño

Away Matches:
CD Ensidesa	0-0	CD Tenerife	Agg:2-6
CD Cartagena	2-1	CA Osasuna	Agg:2-3
Gerona CF	3-2	Córdoba CF	Agg:3-5
Atlético Madrileño	1-1	Gimnástico de Tarragona	Agg:1-5

== Pichichi Trophy ==
Goalscorers	Goal	Team
(Spain) Illán	19	Rayo Vallecano
(Spain) Juárez	18	Murcia
(Spain) Machicha	17	Cádiz
(Spain) Cuesta	15	Córdoba
(Spain) Álvarez	14	Valladolid
