= SD Noja =

Noja
- Full name: Sociedad Deportiva Noja
- Founded: 1963; 63 years ago
- Ground: La Caseta, Noja, Cantabria, Spain
- Capacity: 3,000
- President: Andrés Mantilla
- Head coach: Isidro Díaz
- League: Regional Preferente
- 2025–26: Tercera Federación – Group 3, 18th of 18 (relegated)
- Website: https://sdnoja.es/
Home colours	Away colours

Sociedad Deportiva Noja is a Spanish football team based in Noja, in the autonomous community of Cantabria. Founded in 1963, it plays in Regional Preferente, holding home games at Estadio La Caseta, with a capacity of 3,000 seats.

== History ==
Founded in 1963, Noja had to wait until 1968 to start playing in the Segunda Regional, a new category created by the Cantabrian Football Federation. The club first reached Tercera División in 1987, and achieved a first-ever promotion to Segunda División B in 1998.

Immediately relegated back to the fourth tier, the club returned to the third division in 2002, and again suffered immediate relegation. In May 2012, they again promoted to division three, and achieved their best-ever finish in the category during the season by finishing ninth.

In June 2014, after suffering relegation to the fourth level, Noja was dropped one further category due to their debts with players and managers. The club only returned to a national division in 2021, reaching the newly-formed Tercera División RFEF.

== Season to season ==
Season	Tier	Division	Place	Copa del Rey
1968–69	5	2ª Reg.	9th	
1969–70	5	2ª Reg.	2nd	
1970–71	5	2ª Reg.	1st	
1971–72	4	1ª Reg.	14th	
1972–73	5	2ª Reg.	6th	
1973–74	5	2ª Reg.	8th	
1974–75	4	Reg. Pref.	13th	
1975–76	4	Reg. Pref.	17th	
1976–77	5	1ª Reg.	15th	
1977–78	6	1ª Reg.	15th	
1978–79	6	1ª Reg.	7th	
1979–80	6	1ª Reg.	4th	
1980–81	5	Reg. Pref.	17th	
1981–82	5	Reg. Pref.	11th	
1982–83	5	Reg. Pref.	14th	
1983–84	5	Reg. Pref.	11th	
1984–85	5	Reg. Pref.	9th	
1985–86	5	Reg. Pref.	13th	
1986–87	5	Reg. Pref.	3rd	
1987–88	4	3ª	13th	

Season	Tier	Division	Place	Copa del Rey
1988–89	4	3ª	17th	
1989–90	4	3ª	12th	
1990–91	4	3ª	18th	
1991–92	5	Reg. Pref.	2nd	
1992–93	4	3ª	4th	
1993–94	4	3ª	1st	
1994–95	4	3ª	7th	Second round
1995–96	4	3ª	4th	
1996–97	4	3ª	7th	
1997–98	4	3ª	2nd	
1998–99	3	2ª B	17th	First round
1999–2000	4	3ª	1st	
2000–01	4	3ª	1st	Preliminary
2001–02	4	3ª	1st	Preliminary
2002–03	3	2ª B	18th	Preliminary
2003–04	4	3ª	1st	
2004–05	4	3ª	4th	First round
2005–06	4	3ª	4th	
2006–07	4	3ª	1st	
2007–08	4	3ª	3rd	First round

Season	Tier	Division	Place	Copa del Rey
2008–09	4	3ª	2nd	
2009–10	4	3ª	1st	
2010–11	4	3ª	1st	First round
2011–12	4	3ª	1st	Second round
2012–13	3	2ª B	9th	Third round
2013–14	3	2ª B	19th	
2014–15	5	Reg. Pref.	10th	
2015–16	5	Reg. Pref.	8th	
2016–17	5	Reg. Pref.	17th	
2017–18	6	1ª Reg.	2nd	
2018–19	5	Reg. Pref.	14th	
2019–20	5	Reg. Pref.	7th	
2020–21	5	Reg. Pref.	1st	
2021–22	5	3ª RFEF	13th	
2022–23	6	Reg. Pref.	11th	
2023–24	6	Reg. Pref.	13th	
2024–25	6	Reg. Pref.	3rd	
2025–26	5	3ª Fed.	18th	
2026–27	6	Reg. Pref.		Preliminary

- 4 seasons in Segunda División B
- 22 seasons in Tercera División
- 2 seasons in Tercera Federación/Tercera División RFEF
- 28 seasons in Divisiones Regionales

== Current squad ==
As of 15 September 2013

Note: Flags indicate national team as defined under FIFA eligibility rules; some limited exceptions apply. Players may hold more than one non-FIFA nationality.

No.	Pos.	Nation	Player
—	GK	ESP	Rafa Martínez
—	GK	ESP	Javi González
—	DF	ESP	Aitor Pastoriza
—	DF	ESP	Iñaki
—	DF	CMR	Lucien Owona
—	DF	ESP	Andoni González
—	DF	ESP	Álvaro Pérez
—	DF	ESP	Jaime Bustillo
—	DF	ESP	Grego
—	MF	ESP	Nenu

No.	Pos.	Nation	Player
—	MF	ESP	Rubén García
—	MF	ESP	Xavi Moré
—	MF	ESP	Gerard Badía
—	MF	ESP	Raúl Rodrigo
—	MF	ESP	Ricky
—	MF	ESP	Abel Suárez
—	FW	ESP	Carlos Cagigas
—	FW	ESP	José Antonio Collado
—	FW	ESP	Nacho
—	FW	ARG	Santiago Peroni

== Famous players ==
- (Equatorial Guinea) Chupe
- (Equatorial Guinea) Kily
- (Equatorial Guinea) Iván Zarandona
- (Morocco) Oussama Souaidy
