= Junior Bita =

Equatoguinean footballer (born 2005)

Junior Bitá
Personal information
- Full name: Wibuala Bitá Buetö
- Date of birth: 8 June 2005 (age 21)
- Place of birth: Adzopé, Ivory Coast
- Height: 1.88 m (6 ft 2 in)
- Position: Midfielder

Team information
- Current team: Rayo Cantabria

Youth career
- Santutxu
- 2015–2022: Athletic Bilbao

Senior career*
Years	Team	Apps	(Gls)
2022–2023	Basconia	20	(1)
2023–2025	Bilbao Athletic	25	(0)
2025–2026	Kustošija	24	(1)
2026–	Rayo Cantabria	0	(0)

International career^{‡}
2026–	Equatorial Guinea	1	(0)
- * Club domestic league appearances and goals as of 26 July 2026 ‡ National team caps and goals as of 9 June 2026

Wibuala "Junior" Bitá Buetö (born 8 June 2005) is an Equatoguinean footballer who plays as a midfielder for Segunda Federación club Rayo Cantabria and the Equatorial Guinea national team.

== Early life ==
Bitá was born in Adzopé, Ivory Coast, where his Equatoguinean Bubi parents were exiled due to the persecution suffered by his father (who had participated in the 1998 Bubi revolt). In 2006, following the orders of Teodoro Obiang, his father was killed. After that, his mother left with him and his three siblings and ended up settling in Bilbao, Spain in 2007. He joined the youth academy of Spanish La Liga side Athletic Bilbao at the age of ten.

== Club career ==
Bitá started his senior career with Athletic's farm team, CD Basconia. On 10 September 2022, he debuted in a 2–1 win over CD Aurrerá de Vitoria. He scored his first goal two months later during a 4–2 win over Club San Ignacio. In early 2023 he began playing for the reserve team Bilbao Athletic and was promoted formally ahead of the 2023–24 season.

In 2025, Bitá was transferred to Kustošija.

== International career ==
On 23 May 2026, Bitá was called up to the Equatorial Guinea national team. He made his debut on 9 June 2026.

== Style of play ==
Bitá mainly operates as a midfielder. He is known for his strength and aggression.

== Personal life ==
Bitá is a supporter of Athletic Bilbao. His appearance and playing style has drawn comparisons with Aurélien Tchouaméni.

== Honours ==
Bilbao Athletic

- Segunda Federación (Group 2): 2023–24
