= Diego Rivas =

Diego Rivas may refer to:

- Diego Rivas (footballer, born 1980), Spanish football midfielder
- Diego Rivas (footballer, born 1987), Spanish football goalkeeper
- Diego Rivas (fighter) (born 1991), Chilean boxer and mixed martial artist
