= Orlando Gutiérrez (Spanish footballer) =

Spanish footballer

Orlando
Personal information
- Full name: Orlando Gutiérrez Callejo
- Date of birth: 18 March 1976 (age 50)
- Place of birth: Laredo, Spain
- Height: 1.70 m (5 ft 7 in)
- Position: Full back

Team information
- Current team: Balmaseda (assistant)

Youth career
- Laredo

Senior career*
Years	Team	Apps	(Gls)
1995–2000	Valladolid B	135	(4)
1999–2000	Valladolid	5	(0)
2000–2001	Eibar	0	(0)
2001–2003	Hércules	77	(3)
2003–2004	Lleida	29	(0)
2004–2005	Castellón	31	(0)
2005–2008	Cartagena	93	(3)
2008–2009	Lorca Deportiva	28	(1)
2009–2010	Pontevedra	24	(0)
2010	Cultural Leonesa	17	(0)
2011	Barakaldo	10	(0)
2011–2013	Portugalete		
Total		449	(11)

Managerial career
- 2013–: Balmaseda (assistant)
- * Club domestic league appearances and goals

Orlando Gutiérrez Callejo (born 18 March 1976 in Laredo, Cantabria), known simply as Orlando, is a Spanish former footballer who played as a full back – on either side of the pitch.
