= Vargas, Cantabria =

Locality in Cantabria, Spain

Coordinates: 43°19′N 3°58′W

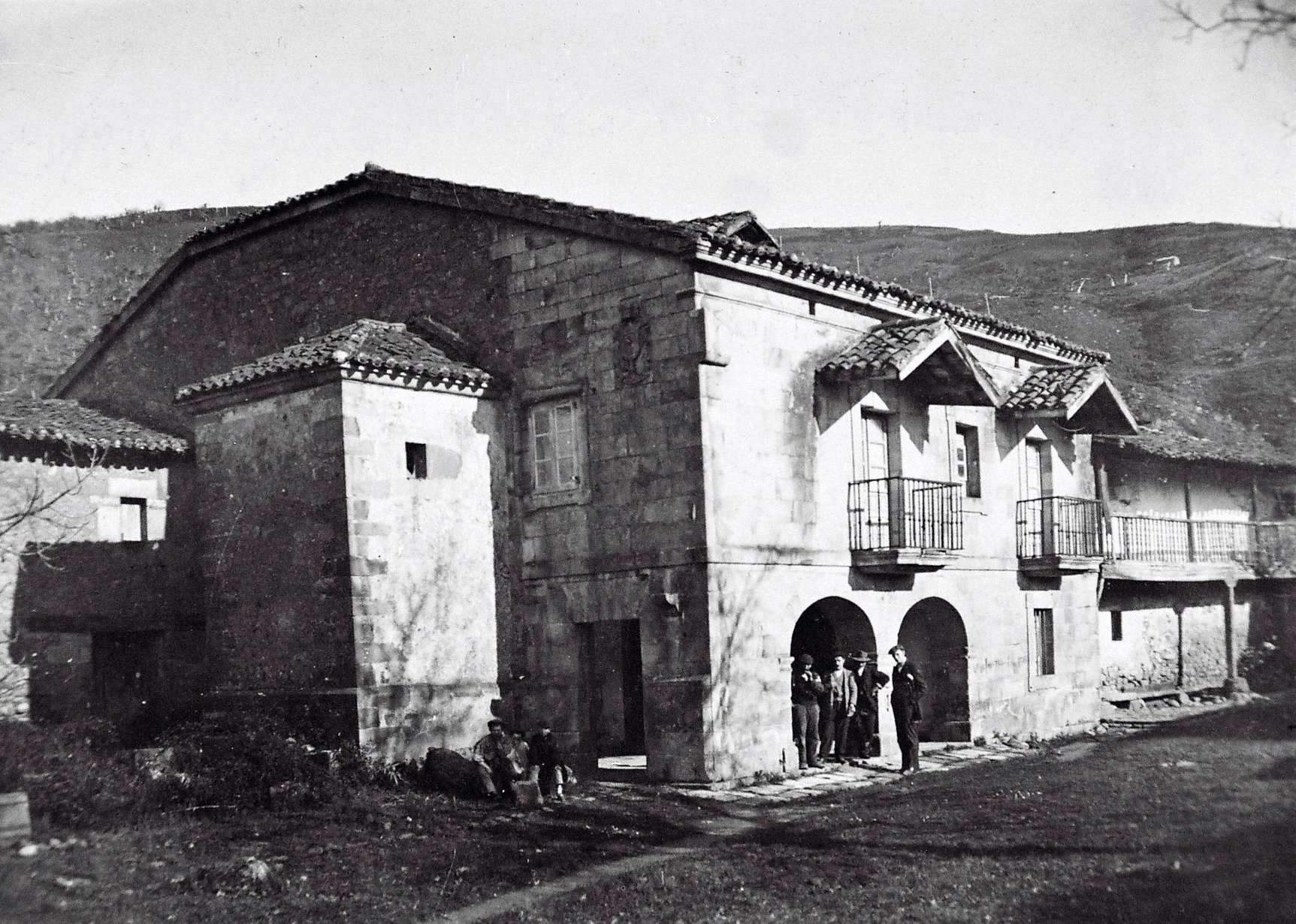
Palacio del Marqués del Castañar, Acebal

Vargas is a locality in the municipality of Puente Viesgo, Cantabria. In 2008 its population was 1,339 people.
