= José María Ceballos =

Spanish footballer

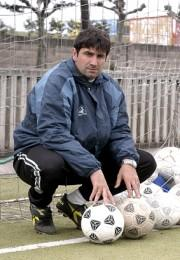
- Ceballos in 2007

Personal information
- Full name: José María Ceballos Vega
- Date of birth: 7 September 1968 (age 58)
- Place of birth: Pámanes, Spain
- Height: 1.82 m (6 ft 0 in)
- Position: Goalkeeper

Youth career
- Cayón
- Racing Santander

Senior career*
Years	Team	Apps	(Gls)
1987–1989	Rayo Cantabria	30	(0)
1988–2003	Racing Santander	426	(0)
Total		456	(0)
- * Club domestic league appearances and goals

José María Ceballos Vega (born 7 September 1968) is a Spanish former professional footballer who played as a goalkeeper.

He made 460 competitive appearances for Racing de Santander, being the player with the most for the club.

== Club career ==
Born in Pámanes, Cantabria, Ceballos only played for local club Racing de Santander during his career, which spanned 16 professional seasons. He started as a senior with Rayo Cantabria, at the time the reserve team, and was already first-choice at the age of 20 in the 1989–90 campaign, suffering relegation from Segunda División in the last matchday.

Ceballos made his debut in La Liga on 5 September 1993, in a 1–0 home win against Rayo Vallecano, going on to start in most of that and the following seven seasons, always in the top division. Racing dropped back to the second tier in 2001, and he retired two years later aged 35.

Ceballos returned to his only team in 2007, being named its youth sides' goalkeeper coach.

== See also ==
- List of one-club men
