= Rayo Cantabria =

Association football club in Spain

- Full name: Rayo Cantabria
- Founded: 1926
- Ground: Campo Santi Gutiérrez Calle, Santander, Cantabria, Spain
- Capacity: 1,000
- President: Manuel Higuera S.A.
- Head coach: Ezequiel Loza
- League: Segunda Federación – Group 1
- 2025–26: Segunda Federación – Group 1, 9th of 18
Home colours	Away colours

Rayo Cantabria, formerly known as Real Racing Club de Santander "B" is the reserve team of Racing de Santander, a Spanish football team based in Santander, in the autonomous community of Cantabria.

Founded in 1926 as a separate club, affiliated with Racing de Santander from 1951 and incorporated formally into the professional club's structure in 1993, the team currently plays in Segunda Federación – Group 1, holding home games at La Albericia, with a capacity of 1,000 spectators.

== History ==
Rayo Cantabria was founded in 1926 as Gimnástica de Miranda, later being renamed Sociedad Deportiva Rayo Cantabria. Having competed independently in the Cantabrian Regional Championship, in 1946 they were promoted to the third tier of Spanish football, the old Tercera División, for the first time; the following campaign, they faced the biggest local club Racing de Santander (or Real Santander as they were known at the time), Rayo being relegated and Racing promoted. In the 1950–51 Tercera División season, Rayo came up against the Racing youth team, Juventud RS with both entering the relegating playoffs; Juventud went down and folded soon after, and from that time Rayo became the Racing farm team.

They went on to spend 20 consecutive years at the third level, coming close to promotion on a few occasions, also performing the important task in developing young local players, some of whom (including Paco Gento, Marquitos, Ico Aguilar, Pedro Zaballa, Vicente Miera and Nando Yosu) went on to great success. They temporarily disassociated from Racing in the 1968–69 and 1969–70 seasons when both were in the same division. After league restructuring in the mid-1970s, Rayo played just one further season at the third level (now Segunda División B) – that was in 1987–88, and they were relegated. Further elite players produced via a spell in the team included Tuto Sañudo, Juan Carlos, Manolo Preciado, Pedro Munitis and José María Ceballos.

In 1993 the original Rayo was dissolved in a national move to formally absorb affiliated teams into the professional clubs' structure, and Racing de Santander B took its place. A new Rayo Cantabria, who started playing as an independent club in the regional leagues from 1993, was also affiliated to Racing for four seasons, from 2003–04 to 2006–07. Racing B have since played nine seasons in Segunda B, lasting no more than two years in any single spell at that level; they would usually meet Dep. Rayo when relegated back to the fourth tier, and finished below their 'sibling' club on three occasions.

In 2018, previous manager Ángel Meñaca was recognised by the city of Santander for his lifetime efforts and contributions towards the running of both the original Rayo up to 1993 and the 'new' Rayo from then on.

In summer 2019, Racing de Santander successfully applied to have their B-team renamed as Rayo Cantabria going forward; the other Rayo club had been removed from the league a year earlier due to unpaid debts.

== Club names ==
Old logo of SD Rayo Cantabria

- Gimnástica de Miranda (1926–1931)
- Rayo Sport de Miranda (1931–1941)
- Sociedad Deportiva Rayo Cantabria (1941–1993)
- Racing de Santander B (1993–2019)
- Rayo Cantabria (2019–)

== Season to season ==
- As a farm team

Season	Tier	Division	Place	Copa del Rey
1938–39	4	1ª Reg.	3rd	
1939–40	DNP			
1940–41	4	1ª Reg.	5th	
1941–42	3	1ª Reg.	1st	
1942–43	3	1ª Reg.	4th	
1943–44	4	1ª Reg.	2nd	
1944–45	4	1ª Reg.	3rd	
1945–46	4	1ª Reg.	1st	
1946–47	3	3ª	4th	
1947–48	3	3ª	13th	Second round
1948–49	4	1ª Reg.	7th	
1949–50	3	3ª	17th	
1950–51	3	3ª	16th	
1951–52	3	3ª	3rd	
1952–53	3	3ª	13th	
1953–54	3	3ª	7th	
1954–55	3	3ª	5th	
1955–56	3	3ª	5th	
1956–57	3	3ª	9th	
1957–58	3	3ª	3rd	

Season	Tier	Division	Place	Copa del Rey
1958–59	3	3ª	2nd	
1959–60	3	3ª	7th	
1960–61	3	3ª	1st	
1961–62	3	3ª	4th	
1962–63	3	3ª	7th	
1963–64	3	3ª	9th	
1964–65	3	3ª	8th	
1965–66	3	3ª	2nd	
1966–67	3	3ª	5th	
1967–68	3	3ª	9th	
1968–69	3	3ª	14th	
1969–70	3	3ª	17th	First round
1970–71	4	1ª Reg.	4th	
1971–72	4	1ª Reg.	2nd	
1972–73	4	1ª Reg.	1st	
1973–74	3	3ª	18th	Second round
1974–75	4	Reg. Pref.	5th	
1975–76	4	Reg. Pref.	2nd	
1976–77	4	Reg. Pref.	2nd	
1977–78	4	3ª	16th	Third round

Season	Tier	Division	Place	Copa del Rey
1978–79	4	3ª	6th	
1979–80	4	3ª	10th	
1980–81	4	3ª	18th	
1981–82	5	Reg. Pref.	1st	
1982–83	4	3ª	4th	
1983–84	4	3ª	17th	Second round
1984–85	4	3ª	5th	
1985–86	4	3ª	4th	Second round

Season	Tier	Division	Place	Copa del Rey
1986–87	4	3ª	1st	Second round
1987–88	3	2ª B	19th	Second round
1988–89	4	3ª	3rd	First round
1989–90	4	3ª	2nd	
1990–91	4	3ª	5th	
1991–92	4	3ª	9th	
1992–93	4	3ª	2nd	

- As a reserve team

Season	Tier	Division	Place
1993–94	4	3ª	2nd
1994–95	4	3ª	1st
1995–96	4	3ª	2nd
1996–97	4	3ª	2nd
1997–98	3	2ª B	17th
1998–99	4	3ª	1st
1999–2000	4	3ª	3rd
2000–01	3	2ª B	17th
2001–02	4	3ª	2nd
2002–03	3	2ª B	11th
2003–04	3	2ª B	17th
2004–05	4	3ª	1st
2005–06	3	2ª B	8th
2006–07	3	2ª B	20th
2007–08	4	3ª	2nd
2008–09	3	2ª B	14th
2009–10	3	2ª B	17th
2010–11	4	3ª	3rd
2011–12	4	3ª	3rd
2012–13	3	2ª B	17th

Season	Tier	Division	Place
2013–14	4	3ª	8th
2014–15	4	3ª	3rd
2015–16	4	3ª	3rd
2016–17	4	3ª	5th
2017–18	4	3ª	5th
2018–19	4	3ª	5th
2019–20	4	3ª	3rd
2020–21	4	3ª	2nd
2021–22	4	2ª RFEF	4th
2022–23	4	2ª Fed.	10th
2023–24	4	2ª Fed.	5th
2024–25	4	2ª Fed.	7th
2025–26	4	2ª Fed.	9th
2026–27	4	2ª Fed.	

- 10 seasons in Segunda División B
- 6 seasons in Segunda Federación/Segunda División RFEF
- 57 seasons in Tercera División

== Current squad ==
As of 14 October 2026.

Note: Flags indicate national team as defined under FIFA eligibility rules; some limited exceptions apply. Players may hold more than one non-FIFA nationality.

No.	Pos.	Nation	Player
1	GK	ESP	Laro Gómez
4	DF	ESP	Álvaro Fernández
5	DF	ESP	Aitor Crespo
6	MF	GEQ	Junior Bita
8	MF	ESP	Hugo Martín
9	FW	ESP	Rodri Ramos
10	MF	ESP	Mario Solórzano
11	FW	ESP	Javi García
13	GK	ESP	Luismi Morales
14	MF	ESP	Andrés Vallecillo
15	FW	ESP	Gaby Jiménez
16	FW	UKR	Yaroslav Boyko

No.	Pos.	Nation	Player
17	DF	ESP	Héctor Mejía
18	FW	SEN	Souleymane Diouf
19	FW	ESP	Jorge Castellanos
20	DF	ESP	Jaime Prieto
21	DF	ESP	Hugo Pérez
22	FW	ESP	Javi Carmona
23	DF	ESP	Jaime Bascuñana
24	MF	BRA	Enzo Juan
27	DF	ESP	Germán Mesonero
—	DF	ESP	Leonard Merino
—	DF	ESP	Rober Bringas
—	MF	ESP	Manu Márquez

=== Reserve team ===
Note: Flags indicate national team as defined under FIFA eligibility rules; some limited exceptions apply. Players may hold more than one non-FIFA nationality.

No.	Pos.	Nation	Player
26	MF	ESP	Daniel Fuentevilla
29	DF	ESP	Pablo Gaitán
30	FW	ESP	Alejandro Laso

No.	Pos.	Nation	Player
31	GK	ESP	Guillermo Ortiz
32	MF	ESP	José Mari García
33	GK	ESP	David Peña

=== Current technical staff ===
Position	Staff
Head coach	(Spain) Ezequiel Loza
Assistant coach	(Spain) Oriol Lozano
Fitness coach	(Spain) José Ángel Gutiérrez
Goalkeeping coach	(Spain) Laureano Echevarría
Delegate	(Spain) Raúl González
Kit man	(Spain) Jesús Herrera (Spain) Chisco
Doctor	(Spain) José Pallás
Physiotherapist	(Spain) Omar Bilal Katerji
Rehab coach	(Spain) Roberto Cabielles Sainz

Last updated: 26 September 2022

== Honours ==
- Tercera División (3rd tier): 1960–61
- Tercera División (4th tier): 1986–87, 1994–95, 1998–99, 2004–05
- Copa Federación de España: 1998–99

== Related teams ==
- Deportivo Rayo Cantabria
