= Racing de Santander =

Spanish professional football club

- Full name: Real Racing Club de Santander, S.A.D.
- Nicknames: Racinguistas; Verdiblancos (Green-and-Whites); Montañeses; (Highlanders)
- Founded: 23 February 1913; 113 years ago as Santander Racing Club
- Stadium: El Sardinero
- Capacity: 22,222
- Owner: Sebastián Ceria
- President: Manuel Higuera Sancho
- Head coach: José Alberto
- League: La Liga
- 2025–26: Segunda División, 1st of 22 (champions)
- Website: realracingclub.es
Home colours	Away colours

Real Racing Club de Santander, S.A.D. (Spanish pronunciation: [reˈal ˈraθiŋ kluβ ðe santanˈdeɾ]), also known as Racing de Santander (pronounced [ˈraθin de santanˈdeɾ]) or simply Racing, is a football club based in Santander, Cantabria, Spain, that currently competes in La Liga, the first tier of the Spanish league system. It was founded in 1913 and it holds home games at El Sardinero, with a capacity for 22,222 spectators. It is one of the ten founding clubs of La Liga.

== History ==
Chart of Racing Santander league performance 1929-present

Real Racing Club played their first football match on 23 February 1913, losing 1–2 to neighbouring Strong. It was officially founded on 14 June, as Santander Racing Club, appearing in its first tournament during that summer (Luis Redonet Trophy) and being admitted to the Northern Federation on 14 November, eventually merging with Santander Football Club.

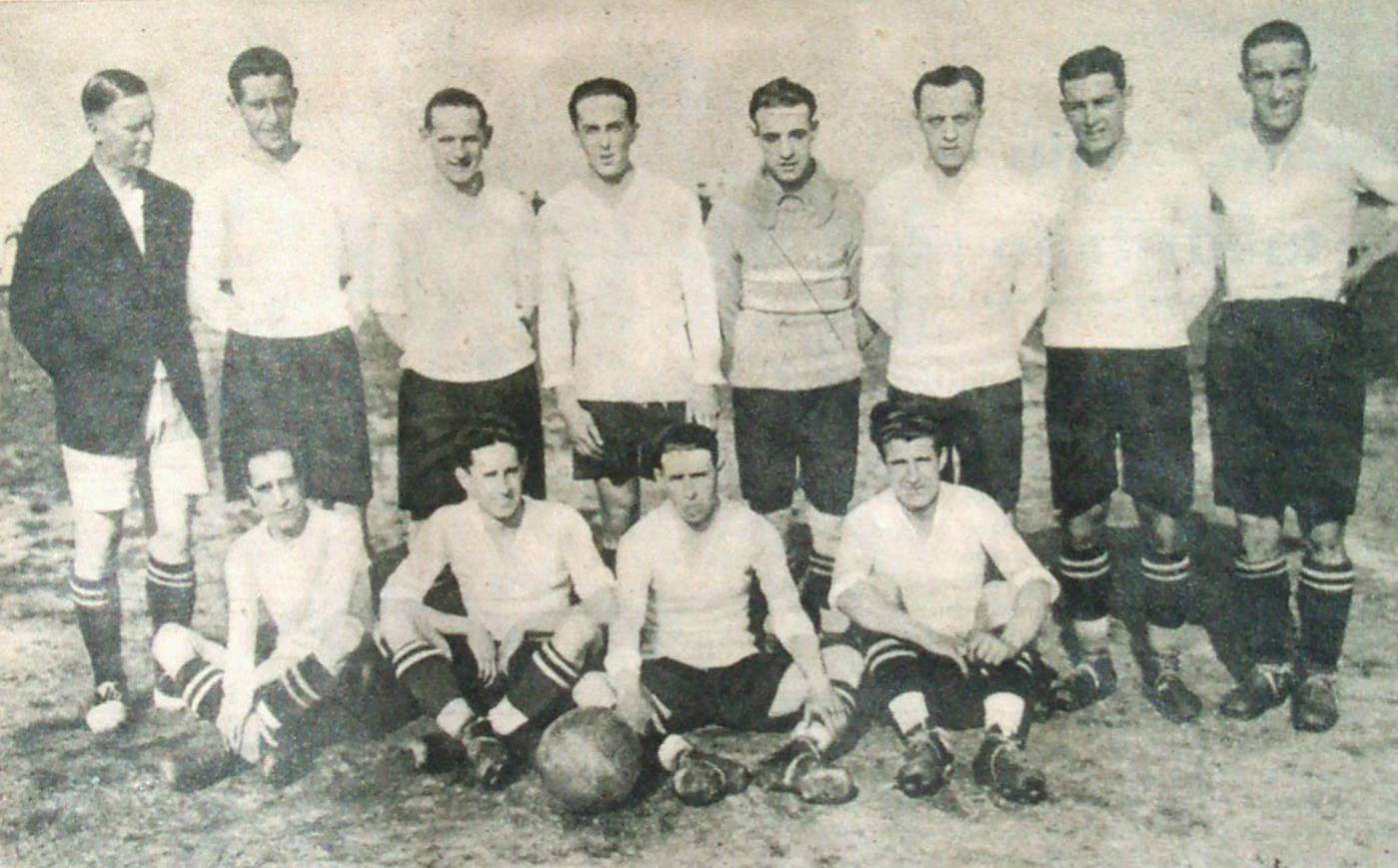
Santander Racing Club squad of 1922. Fred Pentland (first on the left) was the coach of the team this year.

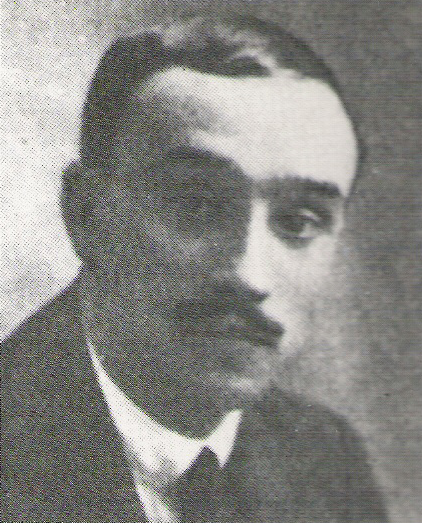
Ángel Sánchez Losada, first president of the club.

In the 1928–29 season, the Spanish League competition began. After a complicated elimination process to determine the tenth and final team for the new First Division, Racing successively beat Valencia, Betis and Sevilla. The club was part of the first goalless game in the league, against Athletic Bilbao.

During the Second Republic, the classifications of Santander varied. In the 1930–31 season, they achieved the runner-up position in the Spanish League, tied at 22 points with champion Athletic Bilbao and third-place Real Sociedad. This is the highest finish achieved by the club in all its history, trained by the English Robert Firth and chaired by Fernando Pombo.

They also participated in the International Tournament of Paris, falling in the semifinal to Slavia of Prague (2–1). In the 1930s, under the presidency of the academic José María de Cossío, it had varied positions, from third place in (1933–34) to low table rankings. In seasons 1934–35 and 1935–36, Racing played in the Commonwealth Championship of Castilla-Aragón, in which it finished second in the first season. Meanwhile, in Cantabria a lesser championship was disputed, not qualifying for the Spanish Cup; Santoña won it. During the 1935–36 season, Racing was the first club in the Spanish league to beat Barcelona and Real Madrid in the four league matches (both home and two as a visitor) in the same season: on 8 December 1935 they won 4–0 against Barcelona in the Campos de Sport de El Sardinero, on 15 December they won in Madrid 2–4, on 8 March 1936 they beat Barcelona 2-3 and on 15 March they defeated Madrid 4–3 at El Sardinero. The only player to score in all matches (one goal in each match, and two in Madrid) was Milucho.

In 1950, the Cantabrians returned to the top flight after a ten-year absence, scoring 99 goals in only 30 games.

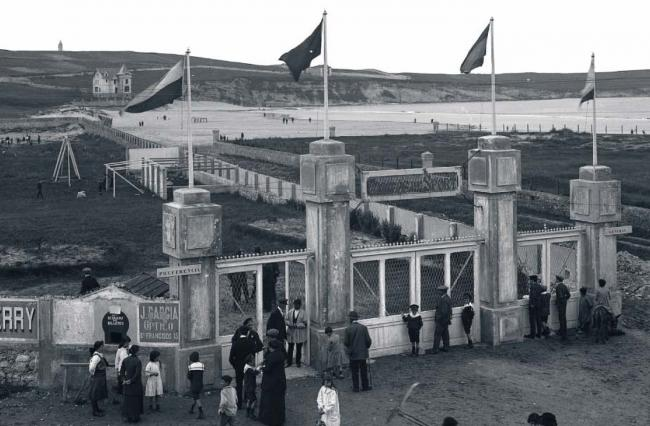
Campos de Sport de El Sardinero before 1910

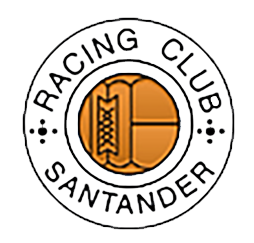
RC Racing de Santander first crest, 1913

During the period of Francoist Spain, the club was renamed Real Santander in 1941, because of the prohibition on non-Spanish names. The name was restored in 1973 as the team returned to the first division one year after nearly relegating, under young manager José María Maguregui. Racing was immediately relegated, and spent the ensuing seasons bouncing between divisions one and two, also being crowned champions in Segunda División B (the new third level, created in 1977) in 1991. Veteran Quique Setién returned to his main club the following year, helping them return to the top flight and scoring in the 1994–95 campaign against Barcelona, in a historic 5–0 home win.

Racing was the first Spanish team to wear a sponsor's name on their shirt: German electronics company Teka on 27 December 1981 away to Real Madrid (the corporation then sponsored the opponents early in the following decade).

On 25 March 2000, Racing played its 1,000th game in La Liga.

In the 2000s, Racing only played one season in the second division, winning promotion with Setién as manager. Racing finished the 2005–06 season in the 16th position, just 1 point away from relegation back to Segunda división. The next season was much better, as the club finished 10th, easily retaining its place in the top flight. In 2007–08, under Marcelino García Toral, it finished in sixth position, thus qualifying to the UEFA Cup for the first time ever; additionally the club reached the semifinals of the Copa del Rey twice during this decade, being ousted by eventual runners-up Getafe and Atlético Madrid in 2008 and 2010, respectively.

On 22 January 2011, Indian business tycoon Ahsan Ali Syed, founder and chairman of investment company Western Gulf Advisory, completed his takeover of Racing de Santander. Following his takeover, he immediately sacked Miguel Ángel Portugal. A turbulent 2011–12 season saw the club go through three different managers, all of which were unable to prevent Racing from being relegated to the Segunda División, bringing an end to their decade stay in the top flight of Spanish football.

At the end of the following campaign, Racing again finished at the bottom of the table, sealing their fate of a consecutive relegation. During the season, Racing had also been immersed in a severe institutional and financial crisis. The club's relegation brought an end to 22 years of playing in Spain's professional divisions. In spite of that plight, the team was able to reach the quarterfinals in the 2013–14 edition of the domestic cup after ousting top-divisioners Sevilla and Almería; in the first leg against the latter, club fans stormed the presidential tribune at Estadio El Sardinero and assaulted chairman Ángel Lavín.

On 27 January 2014, Racing's players, citing several months of unpaid wages, announced they would not play their upcoming cup match unless the club's president and board resigned. Three days later, in the club's second-leg fixture against Real Sociedad, the players gathered at the centre circle following kick-off, refusing to play. Referee Jesús Gil Manzano suspended the game after one minute, with Racing being given a loss due to forfeit. As a result of the protest the club was fined and banned from competing in the following edition of the competition. On 31 January Lavín was sacked, with former player Juan Antonio Sañudo being appointed his successor by practically all the shareholders.

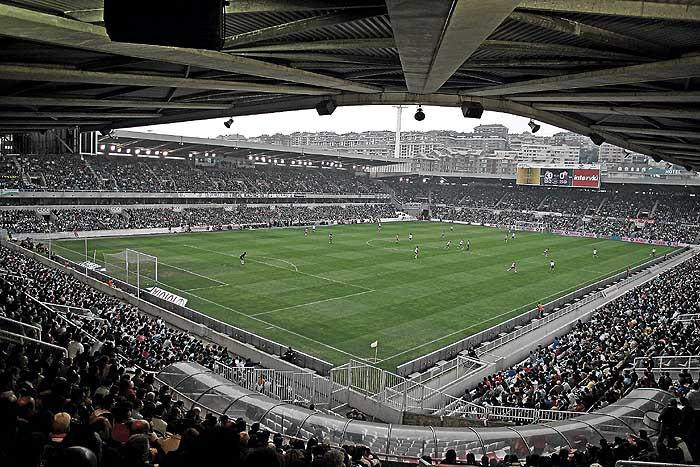
Estadio El Sardinero 2017

Racing won their group in the 2013–14 Segunda División B, and won the playoff against Llagostera to be promoted back to the second tier, but they were immediately relegated in the 2014–15 season. They again took first place in the Segunda B section in 2015–16, but were eliminated in the promotion playoffs, failing to score a goal across four matches in the ties lost to Reus and Cádiz.

Racing was promoted back to the second division after four years in the third tier in 2018–19, by winning their regional group and defeating Atlético Baleares in the promotion playoff on the away goals rule, but they were immediately relegated in the 2019–20 season after only winning five games out of 42 and finished in last place. They were unable to bounce back to the second tier immediately, finishing fourth then second in the unique small two-phase group setup during 2020–21 Segunda División B to find themselves remaining at the third level, in the newly formed Primera División RFEF, for the 2021–22 season. Racing confirmed their finish the season in first place and promoted to Segunda División, after two years in third division and fighting with Deportivo La Coruña for the top spot. On 3 June 2022, Racing took the inaugural Primera División RFEF title with a 3–0 win over Andorra.

After spending 14 years between the second and third division (4 years consecutively in the second), Racing finally won promotion to the top division for the 2026–27 season as they won 4–1 against Real Valladolid in the 40th matchday. On 31 May 2026, Racing secured the league title in the final matchday, following a win 4–1 against Cádiz.

== Rivalries ==
Racing Santander is one of few Spanish teams that have played over 40 seasons in La Liga, but do not have a major rival, mostly because Racing are the only fully professional team from Cantabria, so there isn't much competition between Racing and any other club from that area, with most others playing at the regionalised fourth level; only Gimnástica de Torrelavega have ever reached the second tier. However, Racing fans generally consider their biggest rival to be the major team from the Basque Country, Athletic Bilbao, due to geographic proximity and the long history between these clubs. Bilbao is the closest city to Santander (approximately 100 kilometres (62 mi)), and the relationship between Racing and Athletic has been described in the past as 'the duel of the North', although the rivalry is dormant as Racing have not played in the top division since 2012.

There is also a minor rivalry between Racing and a club from neighboring Asturias: Real Oviedo and a hostility with Getafe.

Racing Santander supporters maintain friendly relations with fans of Sporting Gijón.

== Seasons ==
=== Recent seasons ===
Season		Pos.	Pl.	W	D	L	GF	GA	Pts	Copa del Rey	Notes
1996–97	1D	13	42	11	17	14	52	54	50	Quarter-finals	
1997–98	1D	14	38	12	9	17	46	55	45	3rd round	
1998–99	1D	15	38	10	12	16	41	53	42	Quarter-finals	
1999–2000	1D	15	38	10	16	12	52	50	46	2nd round	
2000–01	1D	19	38	10	9	19	48	62	39	Quarterfinals	Relegated
2001–02	2D	2	42	19	14	9	58	37	71	Round of 64	Promoted
2002–03	1D	16	38	13	5	20	54	64	44	1st round	
2003–04	1D	17	38	11	10	17	48	63	42	3rd round	
2004–05	1D	16	38	12	8	18	41	58	44	3rd round	
2005–06	1D	17	38	9	13	16	36	49	40	3rd round	
2006–07	1D	10	38	12	14	12	42	48	50	2nd round	
2007–08	1D	6	38	17	9	12	42	41	60	Semi-finals	
2008–09	1D	12	38	12	10	16	49	48	46	Round of 16	
2009–10	1D	16	38	9	12	17	42	59	39	Semi-finals	
2010–11	1D	12	38	12	10	16	41	56	46	Round of 32	
2011–12	1D	20	38	4	15	19	28	63	27	Round of 16	Relegated
2012–13	2D	20	42	12	10	20	38	51	46	3rd round	Relegated
2013–14	3D	1	36	17	15	4	55	27	66	Quarterfinals	Promoted
2014–15	2D	19	42	12	8	22	42	53	44	DNP	Relegated
2015–16	3D	1	38	21	11	6	58	28	74	1st round	
2016–17	3D	2	38	26	8	4	86	28	86	Round of 32	
2017–18	3D	5	38	20	8	10	44	33	68	1st round	
2018–19	3D	1	38	22	12	4	66	25	78	Round of 32	Promoted
2019–20	2D	22	42	5	18	19	39	56	33	1st round	Relegated
2020–21	3D	4; 2	26	12	6	8	40	28	42	1st round	(Note: Racing finished 4th in the winter subgroup of their regional group (1 of 5) then 2nd in the springtime subgroup determining which teams would go to Primera División RFEF and which to Segunda División RFEF.)
2021–22	3D	1	38	25	7	6	61	31	82	DNQ	Promoted (Note: Racing finished the season as a champion of the 2021–22 Primera División RFEF after beating Andorra 3–0 in the final.)
2022–23	2D	12	42	14	12	16	39	40	54	2nd round	
2023–24	2D	7	42	18	10	14	63	55	64	1st round	
2024–25	2D	5	42	20	11	11	65	51	71	Round of 32	

=== Season to season ===
Season	Tier	Division	Place	Copa del Rey
1929	1	1ª	10th	Round of 32
1929–30	1	1ª	8th	Round of 32
1930–31	1	1ª	2nd	Round of 32
1931–32	1	1ª	4th	Round of 32
1932–33	1	1ª	8th	Round of 32
1933–34	1	1ª	3rd	Round of 32
1934–35	1	1ª	10th	Round of 16
1935–36	1	1ª	4th	Fourth round
1939–40	1	1ª	12th	Quarter-finals
1940–41	2	2ª	6th	First round
1941–42	2	2ª	4th	Did not play
1942–43	2	2ª	7th	DNP
1943–44	3	3ª	1st	Round of 32
1944–45	2	2ª	6th	Round of 16
1945–46	2	2ª	9th	First round
1946–47	2	2ª	12th	Round of 16
1947–48	3	3ª	1st	Fifth round
1948–49	2	2ª	11th	Fourth round
1949–50	2	2ª	1st	Quarter-finals
1950–51	1	1ª	10th	Quarter-finals

Season	Tier	Division	Place	Copa del Rey
1951–52	1	1ª	14th	DNP
1952–53	1	1ª	11th	Quarter-finals
1953–54	1	1ª	8th	Quarter-finals
1954–55	1	1ª	15th	DNP
1955–56	2	2ª	11th	DNP
1956–57	2	2ª	8th	DNP
1957–58	2	2ª	3rd	DNP
1958–59	2	2ª	9th	First round
1959–60	2	2ª	1st	First round
1960–61	1	1ª	12th	Round of 16
1961–62	1	1ª	14th	Round of 16
1962–63	2	2ª	3rd	First round
1963–64	2	2ª	4th	First round
1964–65	2	2ª	7th	Round of 32
1965–66	2	2ª	8th	Round of 32
1966–67	2	2ª	12th	First round
1967–68	2	2ª	11th	Round of 32
1968–69	3	3ª	2nd	DNP
1969–70	3	3ª	1st	Fourth round
1970–71	2	2ª	13th	Third round

Season	Tier	Division	Place	Copa del Rey
1971–72	2	2ª	15th	Third round
1972–73	2	2ª	3rd	Fourth round
1973–74	1	1ª	17th	Round of 32
1974–75	2	2ª	2nd	Third round
1975–76	1	1ª	12th	Round of 32
1976–77	1	1ª	15th	First round
1977–78	1	1ª	13th	Third round
1978–79	1	1ª	17th	Quarter-finals
1979–80	2	2ª	16th	Third round
1980–81	2	2ª	3rd	Third round
1981–82	1	1ª	12th	Second round
1982–83	1	1ª	18th	Second round
1983–84	2	2ª	4th	Second round
1984–85	1	1ª	11th	Second round
1985–86	1	1ª	12th	Round of 16
1986–87	1	1ª	16th	Third round
1987–88	2	2ª	14th	Round of 32
1988–89	2	2ª	6th	Round of 16
1989–90	2	2ª	17th	First round
1990–91	3	2ª B	1st	Fourth round

Season	Tier	Division	Place	Copa del Rey
1991–92	2	2ª	10th	Fourth round
1992–93	2	2ª	3rd	Fourth round
1993–94	1	1ª	8th	Fourth round
1994–95	1	1ª	12th	Fourth round
1995–96	1	1ª	17th	Third round
1996–97	1	1ª	13th	Quarter-finals
1997–98	1	1ª	14th	Third round
1998–99	1	1ª	15th	Quarter-finals
1999–2000	1	1ª	15th	Second round
2000–01	1	1ª	19th	Quarter-finals
2001–02	2	2ª	2nd	Round of 64
2002–03	1	1ª	16th	Round of 64
2003–04	1	1ª	17th	Round of 32
2004–05	1	1ª	16th	Round of 32
2005–06	1	1ª	17th	Third round
2006–07	1	1ª	10th	Round of 32
2007–08	1	1ª	6th	Semi-finals
2008–09	1	1ª	12th	Round of 16
2009–10	1	1ª	16th	Semi-finals
2010–11	1	1ª	12th	Round of 32

Season	Tier	Division	Place	Copa del Rey
2011–12	1	1ª	20th	Round of 16
2012–13	2	2ª	20th	Third round
2013–14	3	2ª B	1st	Quarter-finals
2014–15	2	2ª	19th	DNP
2015–16	3	2ª B	1st	First round
2016–17	3	2ª B	2nd	Round of 32
2017–18	3	2ª B	5th	1st round
2018–19	3	2ª B	1st	Round of 32
2019–20	2	2ª	22nd	First round
2020–21	3	2ª B	4th / 2nd	First round
2021–22	3	1ª RFEF	1st	DNP
2022–23	2	2ª	12th	Second round
2023–24	2	2ª	7th	First round
2024–25	2	2ª	5th	Round of 32
2025–26	2	2ª	1st	Round of 16
2026–27	1	1ª		

- 45 seasons in La Liga
- 39 seasons in Segunda División
- 1 season in Primera División RFEF
- 7 seasons in Segunda División B
- 4 seasons in Tercera División

== Honours ==
- La Liga
  - Runners-up (1): 1930–31
- Segunda División
  - Winners (3): 1949–50, 1959–60, 2025–26
  - Promoted (6): 1972–73, 1974–75, 1980–81, 1983–84, 1992–93, 2001–02
- Tercera División/Segunda División B/Primera División RFEF
  - Winners (4): 1943–44, 1947–48, 1969–70, 2021–22
  - Group Winners (4): 1990–91, 2013–14, 2015–16, 2018–19
  - Promoted (6): 1943–44, 1947–48, 1969–70, 1990–91, 2013–14, 2018–19
- Cantabrian Championship
  - Winners (13): 1922–23, 1923–24, 1924–25, 1925–26, 1926–27, 1927–28, 1928–29, 1929–30, 1930–31, 1932–33, 1933–34, 1938–39, 1939–40
- Campeonato Regional Norte (Vizcaya y Cantabria):
  - Runners-up (2): 1918–19, 1921–22
- Campeonato Regional Centro:
  - Runners-up (1): 1934–35

== European history ==
Season	Competition	Round	Opponent	Home	Away	Aggregate
2008–09	UEFA Cup	First round	(Finland) Honka	1–0	0–1	2–0
2008–09	UEFA Cup	Group A	(Netherlands) Twente	—N/a	0–1	4th
2008–09	UEFA Cup	Group A	(Germany) Schalke 04	1–1	—N/a	4th
2008–09	UEFA Cup	Group A	(France) Paris Saint-Germain	—N/a	2–2	4th
2008–09	UEFA Cup	Group A	(England) Manchester City	3–1	—N/a	4th

== Current squad ==
As of 2 September 2026

Note: Flags indicate national team as defined under FIFA eligibility rules; some limited exceptions apply. Players may hold more than one non-FIFA nationality.

No.	Pos.	Nation	Player
1	GK	SWE	Simon Eriksson
2	DF	ESP	Álvaro Mantilla (vice-captain)
3	DF	ESP	Aarón Martín
4	DF	ESP	Manu Hernando
5	DF	ESP	Pablo Ramón
6	MF	ESP	Íñigo Sainz-Maza (captain)
7	FW	GEO	Giorgi Guliashvili
8	MF	POR	André Almeida (on loan from Valencia)
9	FW	ESP	Juan Carlos Arana
10	MF	ESP	Iñigo Vicente
11	FW	ESP	Andrés Martín
12	FW	ESP	Asier Villalibre

No.	Pos.	Nation	Player
13	GK	ESP	Julen Agirrezabala
14	MF	SEN	Maguette Gueye
15	FW	ESP	Pablo García
16	DF	URU	Facundo González
17	DF	ESP	Jorge Salinas
18	MF	ITA	Matteo Prati (on loan from Cagliari)
19	FW	ESP	Iker Luque
20	MF	ESP	Sergio Canales
21	FW	MAR	Yassir Zabiri (on loan from Rennes)
22	DF	BRA	Pedro Felipe
23	MF	ESP	Iván Martín
24	DF	FRA	Jeanuël Belocian (on loan from Bayer Leverkusen)

=== Reserve team ===
Note: Flags indicate national team as defined under FIFA eligibility rules; some limited exceptions apply. Players may hold more than one non-FIFA nationality.

No.	Pos.	Nation	Player
26	DF	ESP	Álvaro Fernández
28	DF	ESP	Héctor Mejía
29	MF	ESP	Andrés Vallecillo
30	DF	ESP	Carlos Sánchez
31	GK	ESP	Laro Gómez
33	FW	ESP	Jorge Castellanos

No.	Pos.	Nation	Player
38	DF	ESP	Hugo Pérez
39	FW	ESP	Gaby Jiménez
41	MF	ESP	Mario Solórzano
42	MF	GEQ	Junior Bita
43	FW	ESP	Alejandro Laso

=== Out on loan ===
Note: Flags indicate national team as defined under FIFA eligibility rules; some limited exceptions apply. Players may hold more than one non-FIFA nationality.

No.	Pos.	Nation	Player
—	GK	ESP	Jokin Ezkieta (at Cádiz until 30 June 2027)
—	MF	ESP	Aritz Aldasoro (at Oviedo until 30 June 2027)

No.	Pos.	Nation	Player
—	MF	ESP	Diego Díaz (at Andorra until 30 June 2027)

== Current technical staff ==
Position	Staff
Head coach	(Spain) José Alberto
Assistant coach	(Spain) Pablo Álvarez
Technical assistant	(Spain) Enric Soriano (Spain) José Moratón
Fitness coach	(Spain) Albert Tataret (Spain) Dani Salvador
Goalkeeping coach	(Spain) Pedro Dorronsoro
Analyst	(Spain) Jorge Polvorinos
Delegate	(Spain) Delfín Calzada
Equipment manager	(Spain) Sergio San Juan (Spain) Manolo San Juan
Doctor	(Spain) Gonzalo Revuelta
Rehab fitness coach	(Spain) Hugo Camarero
Physiotherapist	(Spain) Diego Ortiz (Spain) Javier Martín (Spain) Antonio Malanda (Spain) Fran Ruiz
Nutritionist	(Spain) Juan Carlos Llamas
Psychologist	(Spain) José Ángel Badiola
Podiatrist	(Spain) José Andreu

Last updated: 11 August 2026
Source: Real Racing Club (in Spanish)

== Notable former players ==
Note: this list includes players that have appeared in at least 100 league games and/or have reached international status.

- (Algeria) Mehdi Lacen
- (Argentina) Aldo Duscher
- (Argentina) Ezequiel Garay
- (Argentina) Lionel Scaloni
- (Argentina) Gabriel Schürrer
- (Belarus) Andrei Zygmantovich
- (Belgium) Erwin Lemmens
- (Brazil) Felipe Melo
- (Brazil) Henrique
- (Burundi) Mohamed Tchité
- (Chile) Waldo Ponce
- (Chile) Mauricio Pinilla
- (Colombia) Léider Preciado
- (Equatorial Guinea) Rodolfo Bodipo
- (Equatorial Guinea) Iván Bolado
- (Greece) Alexandros Tziolis
- (Israel) Omri Afek
- (Israel) Dudu Aouate
- (Israel) Yossi Benayoun
- (Mexico) Luis de la Fuente
- (Mexico) Giovani dos Santos
- (Mexico) Gerardo Torrado
- (Morocco) Walid Regragui
- (Nigeria) Mutiu Adepoju
- (Norway) Sigurd Rushfeldt
- (Poland) Ebi Smolarek
- (Portugal) Vítor Damas
- (Republic of Ireland) Liam Buckley
- (Romania) Marcel Sabou
- (Russia) Vladimir Beschastnykh
- (Russia) Ilshat Fayzulin
- (Russia) Dmitri Popov
- (Russia) Dmitri Radchenko
- (Russia) Sergey Shustikov
- (Serbia) Nikola Žigić
- (South Africa) Nasief Morris
- (Spain) Álvaro Cervera
- (Spain) José Emilio Amavisca
- (Spain) Juan Carlos Arteche
- (Spain) José María Ceballos
- (Spain) Gonzalo Colsa
- (Spain) Francisco Gento
- (Spain) Luis García
- (Spain) Javi Guerrero
- (Spain) Enrique Larrinaga
- (Spain) Juan Carlos
- (Spain) Javier Manjarín
- (Spain) Marcos Alonso
- (Spain) Vicente Miera
- (Spain) Fernando Morán
- (Spain) José Moratón
- (Spain) Pedro Munitis
- (Spain) Ismael Ruiz
- (Spain) Salva
- (Spain) Juan Antonio Sañudo
- (Spain) Santillana
- (Spain) Quique Setién
- (Spain) Toño
- (Sweden) Kennedy Bakircioglu
- (Sweden) Olof Mellberg
- (Sweden) Markus Rosenberg
- (Switzerland) Fabio Coltorti
- (Tunisia) Mehdi Nafti
- (Uruguay) Nelson Abeijón
- (Uruguay) Fernando Correa
- (Uruguay) Federico Magallanes
- (Uruguay) Mario Regueiro
- (Uruguay) Cristhian Stuani
- (Uruguay) Washington Tais
- (Uruguay) José Zalazar
- (United States) Carlos Bocanegra
- (Venezuela) Julio Álvarez

=== World Cup players ===
The following players have been selected by their country in the World Cup Finals, while playing for Racing Santander.

- (Nigeria) Mutiu Adepoju (1994)
- (Russia) Dmitri Radchenko (1994)
- (Russia) Dmitri Popov (1994)
- (Uruguay) Mario Regueiro (2002)
- (Algeria) Mehdi Lacen (2010)
- (Colombia) Gustavo Puerta (2026)

== Former coaches ==
Dates	Name
1916–17	(Spain) Pepe Beraza
1917–20	N/A
1920–22	(England) Fred Pentland
1922–29	(Republic of Ireland) Patrick O'Connell
1929–30	(Spain) Francisco Pagaza
1930–32	(England) Robert Firth
1932–33	(Spain) Francisco Pagaza
1933–35	(England) Randolph Galloway
1935–36	(Spain) Francisco González Galán
1936–39	(empty)
1939–40	(Spain) Óscar Rodríguez
1940	(Spain) Cristóbal Martí
1940–41	(Spain) Manuel Vidal
1941–43	(Spain) Francisco Pagaza
1943–44	(Spain) Manuel López Llamosas
1944–46	(Spain) Gabriel Andonegui
1946–47	(Spain) Pedro Areso
1947–49	(Ireland) Patrick O'Connell
1949	(Spain) Francisco Hernández Galán
1949–50	(Argentina) Lino Taioli
1950–51	(Spain) Antonio Barrios
1951–52	(Argentina) Oso Díaz
1952	(Spain) Félix Elizondo
1952	(Argentina) Enrique Palomini
1952	(Spain) Nando González
1952–54	(Spain) Juan Otxoantezana

Dates	Name
1954–55	(Spain) Luis Urquiri
1955–56	(Spain) Nando González
1956–58	(Spain) Enrique Orizaola
1958	(Spain) Víctor Garay
1958–59	(Spain) Juan Ruiz Cambra
1959–60	(France) Louis Hon
1960–62	(Brazil) Otto Bumbel
1962	(Spain) Luis Alfonso Villalaín
1962–63	(Spain) Miguel Gual Agustina
1963	(Spain) Fernando Argila
1963	(Spain) Manuel Fernández Mora
1963–64	(France) Louis Hon
1964–65	(Spain) Rafael Yunta
1965	(Spain) Rafael Alsua
1965–66	(Spain) José Valdor Sierra
1966–67	(Spain) Ramón Cobo
1967–68	(Spain) Laureano Ruiz
1968	(Spain) Manuel Ibarra Echano
1968–69	(Spain) Ernesto Pons
1969–72	(Spain) Manuel Fernández Mora
1972	(Spain) José Bermúdez
1972–77	(Spain) José María Maguregui
1977–79	(Spain) Nando Yosu
1979	(Spain) Santiago Gutiérrez
1979–80	(Spain) Laureano Ruiz
1980–83	(Spain) Manuel Fernández Mora

Dates	Name
1983–87	(Spain) José María Maguregui
1987–88	(Spain) Delfín Álvarez
1988	(Spain) Santiago Gutiérrez
1988	(Austria) Hermann Stessl
1988–90	(Spain) José Armando Ufarte
1990	(Spain) Antonio Martínez "Pachín"
1990–92	(Spain) Félix Bardera "Felines"
1992–93	(Spain) Paquito García
1993–94	(Spain) Javier Irureta
1994–96	(Spain) Vicente Miera
1996	(Spain) Nando Yosu
1996–98	(Spain) Marcos Alonso
1998–99	(Spain) Nando Yosu
1999	(Spain) Miguel Sánchez
1999–2000	(Paraguay) Gustavo Benítez
2000	(Spain) Andoni Goikoetxea
2000–01	(Spain) Gregorio Manzano
2001	(Paraguay) Gustavo Benítez
2001–02	(Spain) Quique Setién
2002–03	(Spain) Manuel Preciado
2003	(Spain) Chuchi Cos
2003–05	(Spain) Lucas Alcaraz
2005	(Spain) Nando Yosu
2005–06	(Spain) Manuel Preciado
2006	(Spain) Nando Yosu
2006	(Spain) Juan Ramón López Caro

Dates	Name
2006–07	(Spain) Miguel Ángel Portugal
2007–08	(Spain) Marcelino García Toral
2008–09	(Spain) Juan Ramón López Muñiz
2009	(Spain) Juan Carlos Mandiá
2009	(Spain) Juanjo González
2009–11	(Spain) Miguel Ángel Portugal
2011	(Spain) Marcelino
2011	(Argentina) Héctor Cúper
2011–12	(Spain) Juanjo González
2012	(Spain) Álvaro Cervera
2012	(Spain) Juan Carlos Unzué
2012	(Spain) Fabri González
2012–13	(Spain) José Aurelio Gay
2013	(Spain) Alejandro Menéndez
2013–15	(Spain) Paco Fernández
2015	(Spain) Javier Pinillos
2015–16	(Spain) Pedro Munitis
2016–18	(Spain) Ángel Viadero
2018	(Spain) Carlos Pouso
2018–19	(Spain) Iván Ania
2019–20	(Spain) Cristóbal Parralo
2020	(Spain) José Luis Oltra
2020	(Spain) Javi Rozada
2020–2021	(Spain) Aritz Solabarrieta
2021–2022	(Spain) Guillermo Fernández Romo

== See also ==
- Rayo Cantabria – Racing's reserve team
- CDE Racing Féminas – affiliated women's team
