= 2025–26 Racing de Santander season =

Racing de Santander
2025–26 season
- Owner: Sebastián Ceria
- President: Manolo Higuera
- Head coach: José Alberto
- Stadium: El Sardinero
- Segunda División: 1st (promoted)
- Copa del Rey: Round of 16
- Top goalscorer: League: Andrés Martín (23); All: Andrés Martín (23)
| Home colours | Away colours | Third colours |

The 2025–26 season was the 113th season in the history of Racing de Santander, and the club's fourth consecutive season in the Segunda División. In addition to the domestic league, the club participated in the Copa del Rey.

On 16 May 2026, the Cantabrian club secured promotion to La Liga, marking their return after an absence since 2012.

== First-team squad ==
As of 14 February 2026

Note: Flags indicate national team as defined under FIFA eligibility rules; some limited exceptions apply. Players may hold more than one non-FIFA nationality.

| No. | Pos. | Nation | Player |
|---|---|---|---|
| 1 | GK | ESP | Jokin Ezkieta |
| 2 | DF | ESP | Álvaro Mantilla |
| 3 | DF | ESP | Mario García |
| 4 | DF | ESP | Manu Hernando |
| 5 | DF | ESP | Javi Castro |
| 6 | MF | ESP | Íñigo Sainz-Maza (captain) |
| 7 | FW | GEO | Giorgi Guliashvili |
| 8 | MF | ESP | Aritz Aldasoro |
| 9 | FW | ESP | Juan Carlos Arana |
| 10 | MF | ESP | Iñigo Vicente |
| 11 | FW | ESP | Andrés Martín |
| 12 | FW | ESP | Asier Villalibre (on loan from Alavés) |
| 13 | GK | SWE | Simon Eriksson |

| No. | Pos. | Nation | Player |
|---|---|---|---|
| 14 | MF | SEN | Maguette Gueye |
| 15 | MF | ESP | Marco Sangalli |
| 16 | DF | URU | Facundo González (on loan from Juventus) |
| 17 | FW | ESP | Jaime Mata |
| 18 | MF | ESP | Peio Canales (on loan from Athletic Bilbao) |
| 19 | MF | COL | Gustavo Puerta |
| 20 | FW | GAM | Suleiman Camara |
| 21 | DF | ESP | Pablo Ramón (on loan from Espanyol) |
| 23 | MF | ESP | Damián Rodríguez (on loan from Celta Vigo) |
| 27 | FW | ESP | Manex Lozano (on loan from Athletic Bilbao) |
| 32 | DF | ESP | Jorge Salinas |
| 36 | MF | ESP | Sergio Martínez |

=== Reserve team ===
Note: Flags indicate national team as defined under FIFA eligibility rules; some limited exceptions apply. Players may hold more than one non-FIFA nationality.

| No. | Pos. | Nation | Player |
|---|---|---|---|
| 31 | GK | ESP | Álvaro Jiménez |
| 33 | DF | ESP | Samu Calera |
| 34 | FW | ESP | Diego Díaz |
| 35 | GK | ESP | Laro Gómez |

| No. | Pos. | Nation | Player |
|---|---|---|---|
| 37 | DF | ESP | Aitor Crespo |
| 43 | FW | ESP | Santi Franco |
| 44 | MF | ESP | Diego Fuentes |
| 45 | MF | ESP | Andrés Vallecillo |

=== Out on loan ===
Note: Flags indicate national team as defined under FIFA eligibility rules; some limited exceptions apply. Players may hold more than one non-FIFA nationality.

| No. | Pos. | Nation | Player |
|---|---|---|---|
| — | DF | FRA | Clément Michelin (at Valladolid until 30 June 2026) |
| — | MF | ESP | Neco Celorio (at Lugo until 30 June 2026) |

| No. | Pos. | Nation | Player |
|---|---|---|---|
| — | MF | ESP | Yeray (at Andorra until 30 June 2026) |

== Transfers ==
=== In ===
| Pos. | Player | Transferred from | Fee | Date | Source |
|---|---|---|---|---|---|
| MF | (Spain) Yeray Cabanzón | (Spain) Ponferradina | Loan return | 30 June 2025 | |
| GK | (Bulgaria) Plamen Andreev | (Netherlands) Feyenoord | Loan | 29 July 2025 | |
| FW | (Spain) Asier Villalibre | (Spain) Alavés | Loan | 9 August 2025 | |
| MF | (Spain) Peio Canales | (Spain) Athletic Bilbao | Loan | 15 August 2025 | |
| DF | (Spain) Pablo Ramón | (Spain) Espanyol | Loan | 28 August 2025 | |
| DF | (Uruguay) Facundo González | (Italy) Juventus | Loan | 1 September 2025 | |
| MF | (Colombia) Gustavo Puerta | (Germany) Bayer Leverkusen | €3,500,000 | 1 September 2025 | |
| MF | (Spain) Damián Rodríguez | (Spain) Celta Vigo | Loan | 6 January 2026 | |
| FW | (Georgia (country)) Giorgi Guliashvili | (Bosnia and Herzegovina) Sarajevo | €3,000,000 | 9 January 2026 | |
| MF | (Spain) Manex Lozano | (Spain) Basconia | Loan | 10 January 2026 | |
| GK | (Sweden) Simon Eriksson | (Sweden) IF Elfsborg | €2,000,000 | 19 January 2026 | |
| FW | (Spain) Jaime Mata | Unattached | | 9 February 2026 | |

=== Out ===
| Pos. | Player | Transferred to | Fee | Date | Source |
|---|---|---|---|---|---|
| MF | (Spain) Rober González | (Netherlands) NEC Nijmegen | Loan return | 30 June 2025 | |
| FW | (Spain) Jon Karrikaburu | (Spain) Real Sociedad | Loan return | 30 June 2025 | |
| MF | (Spain) Víctor Meseguer | (Spain) Real Valladolid | Loan return | 30 June 2025 | |
| MF | (Spain) Pablo Rodríguez | (Italy) Lecce | Loan return | 30 June 2025 | |
| MF | (Spain) Unai Vencedor | (Spain) Athletic Bilbao | Loan return | 30 June 2025 | |
| GK | (Spain) Miquel Parera | (Spain) Racing de Ferrol | | 10 July 2025 | |
| FW | (Spain) Ekain Zenitagoia | (Spain) Real Murcia | | 19 July 2025 | |
| MF | (Ivory Coast) Lago Junior | (Spain) Lugo | | 22 July 2025 | |
| DF | (Spain) Pol Moreno | (India) FC Goa | | 24 July 2025 | |
| DF | (Spain) Javi Montero | (Spain) Málaga | | 4 August 2025 | |
| DF | (Spain) Saúl García | (Spain) Racing de Ferrol | | 1 September 2025 | |
| FW | (Ecuador) Jeremy Arévalo | (Germany) VfB Stuttgart | €7,500,000 | 2 January 2026 | |
| GK | (Bulgaria) Plamen Andreev | (Netherlands) Feyenoord | Loan return (early) | 8 January 2026 | |
| MF | (Spain) Yeray Cabanzón | FC Andorra | Loan | 9 January 2026 | |
| DF | (France) Clément Michelin | (Spain) Real Valladolid | Loan | 2 February 2026 | |

== Pre-season and friendlies ==
| 19 July 2025 | Racing Santander (Cantabria) | 2–0 | (Basque Country (autonomous community)) Eibar |

| 23 July 2025 | Racing Santander (Cantabria) | 2–1 | (Asturias) Real Avilés Industrial |

| 26 July 2025 | Racing Santander (Cantabria) | 2–0 | (Asturias) Sporting Gijón |

| 30 July 2025 | Racing Santander (Cantabria) | 2–1 | (Basque Country (autonomous community)) Athletic Bilbao |

| 2 August 2025 | Osasuna (Navarre) | 0–1 | (Cantabria) Racing Santander |

| 9 August 2025 | Racing Santander (Spain) | 0–0 | (Italy) Cagliari |

| 9 August 2025 | Racing Santander (Spain) | 1–1 | (Italy) Cagliari |

== Competitions ==
=== Overall record ===
| Competition | First match | Last match | Starting round | Final position | Record | | | | | | | |
| Competition | First match | Last match | Starting round | Final position | Pld | W | D | L | GF | GA | GD | Win % |
|---|---|---|---|---|---|---|---|---|---|---|---|---|
| Segunda División | 16 August 2025 | 31 May 2026 | Matchday 1 | Winners | 42 | 25 | 7 | 10 | 90 | 61 | +29 | 59.52 |
| Copa del Rey | 28 October 2025 | 15 January 2026 | First round | Round of 16 | 4 | 3 | 0 | 1 | 8 | 4 | +4 | 75.00 |
| Total | | | | | 46 | 28 | 7 | 11 | 98 | 65 | +33 | 60.87 |

Source: Competitions

=== Segunda División ===
| Pos | Team | Pld | W | D | L | GF | GA | GD | Pts | Qualification or relegation |
|---|---|---|---|---|---|---|---|---|---|---|
| 1 | Racing Santander (C, P) | 42 | 25 | 7 | 10 | 90 | 61 | +29 | 82 | Promotion to La Liga |
| 2 | Deportivo La Coruña (P) | 42 | 22 | 11 | 9 | 65 | 44 | +21 | 77 | Promotion to La Liga |
| 3 | Almería | 42 | 22 | 8 | 12 | 81 | 63 | +18 | 74 | Qualification for promotion play-offs |
| 4 | Málaga (O, P) | 42 | 21 | 10 | 11 | 75 | 52 | +23 | 73 (Note: Málaga finished ahead of Las Palmas on head-to-head points: Málaga 2–0 Las Palmas, Las Palmas 0–1 Málaga.) | Qualification for promotion play-offs |
| 5 | Las Palmas | 42 | 20 | 13 | 9 | 57 | 40 | +17 | 73 | Qualification for promotion play-offs |

Source: LaLiga Hypermotion
Rules for classification: 1) Points; 2) Head-to-head points; 3) Head-to-head goal difference; 4) Goal difference; 5) Goals scored; 6) Fair-play points
(Note: Head-to-head record is used only after all the matches between the teams in question have been played)
(C) Champions; (O) Play-off winners; (P) Promoted

==== Results summary ====
| Overall | | | | | | | | Home | | | | | | Away | | | | | |
| Pld | W | D | L | GF | GA | GD | Pts | W | D | L | GF | GA | GD | W | D | L | GF | GA | GD |
|---|---|---|---|---|---|---|---|---|---|---|---|---|---|---|---|---|---|---|---|
| 42 | 25 | 7 | 10 | 90 | 61 | +29 | 82 | 15 | 2 | 4 | 55 | 29 | +26 | 10 | 5 | 6 | 35 | 32 | +3 |

Last updated: 31 May 2026.
Source: LALIGA HYPERMOTION

==== Results by round ====
| Round | 1 | 2 | 3 | 4 | 5 | 6 | 7 | 8 | 9 | 10 | 11 | 12 | 13 | 14 | 15 | 16 | 17 | 18 | 19 | 20 | 21 | 22 | 23 | 24 | 25 | 26 | 27 | 28 | 29 | 30 | 31 | 32 | 33 | 34 | 35 | 36 | 37 | 38 | 39 | 40 | 41 | 42 |
|---|---|---|---|---|---|---|---|---|---|---|---|---|---|---|---|---|---|---|---|---|---|---|---|---|---|---|---|---|---|---|---|---|---|---|---|---|---|---|---|---|---|---|
| Ground | H | A | H | A | H | A | H | H | A | H | A | H | A | H | A | H | A | H | A | A | H | H | A | A | H | A | H | A | H | A | H | A | H | A | H | A | A | H | A | H | A | H |
| Result | W | W | W | W | L | D | L | W | L | W | W | W | L | D | W | W | W | D | D | D | L | W | W | L | W | L | W | W | W | W | L | L | W | L | W | W | D | W | W | W | D | W |
| Position | 4 | 2 | 1 | 1 | 1 | 3 | 4 | 2 | 3 | 1 | 1 | 1 | 1 | 2 | 2 | 2 | 1 | 1 | 1 | 1 | 1 | 1 | 1 | 1 | 1 | 2 | 1 | 1 | 1 | 1 | 1 | 1 | 1 | 1 | 1 | 1 | 1 | 1 | 1 | 1 | 1 | 1 |

Source: LALIGA HYPERMOTION
A = Away; H = Home; W = Win; D = Draw; L = Loss

==== Matches ====
| 16 August 2025 1 | Racing Santander | 3–1 | Castellón | Santander |
| 18:00 | Villalibre 6'; Martín 39' 84' (pen.); Mantilla (yellow card) 60'; Martínez (yellow card) 66'; Vicente (yellow card) 90+5' | Report | Camara 45+1'; Jiménez (red card) 83' | Stadium: Campos de Sport de El Sardinero; Attendance: 21,796; Referee: (Spain) Dámaso Arcediano Monescillo |

| 25 August 2025 2 | Albacete | 2–3 | Racing Santander | Albacete |
| 19:30 | Agus Medina 50'; Morcillo 64'; Escriche (yellow card) 86' | | Martín 58' (yellow card) 90+3'; Salinas (yellow card) 74'; Villalibre 77' 83' (yellow card) 85' | Stadium: Estadio Carlos Belmonte; Attendance: 11,758; Referee: (Spain) Alejandro Morilla Turrión |

| 30 August 2025 3 | Racing Santander | 4–1 | Ceuta | Santander |
| 17:00 | Villalibre 9'; Vicente 24' 55'; Arévalo 81' | Report | Matos (yellow card) 21'; Rubén Díez 30' (pen.); Anuar Tuhami (red card) 45+5' | Stadium: Campos de Sport de El Sardinero; Attendance: 20,789; Referee: (Spain) Luis Bestard Servera |

| 7 September 2025 4 | Almería | 2–3 | Racing Santander | Almería |
| 18:30 | Embarba 11'; Melamed 19'; Lopy (red card) 27' | Report | Arévalo 57', 59'; Puerta 75' | Stadium: UD Almería Stadium; Attendance: 14,328; Referee: (Spain) Andrés Fuentes Molina |

| 14 September 2025 5 | Racing Santander | 2–4 | Cultural Leonesa | Santander |
| | | | | Stadium: Campos de Sport de El Sardinero |

| 21 September 2025 6 | Córdoba | 2–2 | Racing Santander |

| 27 September 2025 7 | Racing Santander | 1–2 | Andorra | Santander |
| | | | | Stadium: Campos de Sport de El Sardinero |

| 5 October 2025 8 | Racing Santander | 3–0 | Málaga | Santander |
| | | | | Stadium: Campos de Sport de El Sardinero |

| 12 October 2025 9 | Sporting Gijón | 2–1 | Racing Santander |

| 19 October 2025 10 | Racing Santander | 2–1 | Deportivo de La Coruña | Santander |
| | | | | Stadium: Campos de Sport de El Sardinero |

| 25 October 2025 11 | Mirandés | 1–3 | Racing Santander |

| 31 October 2025 12 | Racing Santander | 1–0 | Real Sociedad B | Santander |
| | | | | Stadium: Campos de Sport de El Sardinero |

| 9 November 2025 13 | Las Palmas | 3–1 | Racing Santander |

| 15 November 2025 14 | Racing Santander | 2–2 | Granada | Santander |
| | | | | Stadium: Campos de Sport de El Sardinero |

| 23 November 2025 15 | Burgos | 0–2 | Racing Santander |

| 30 November 2025 16 | Racing Santander | 4–0 | Eibar | Santander |
| | | | | Stadium: Campos de Sport de El Sardinero |

| 7 December 2025 17 | Cádiz | 2–3 | Racing Santander |

| 13 December 2025 18 | Racing Santander | 1–1 | Leganés | Santander |
| | | | | Stadium: Campos de Sport de El Sardinero |

| 20 December 2025 19 | Huesca | 1–1 | Racing Santander |

| 3 January 2026 20 | Valladolid | 1–1 | Racing Santander |

| 10 January 2026 21 | Racing Santander | 2–3 | Zaragoza | Santander |
| | | | | Stadium: Campos de Sport de El Sardinero |

| 18 January 2026 22 | Racing Santander | 4–1 | Las Palmas |

| 25 January 2026 23 | Deportivo de La Coruña | 0–1 | Racing Santander |

| 1 February 2026 24 | Granada | 1–0 | Racing Santander |

| 9 February 2026 25 | Racing Santander | 1–0 | Mirandés |

| 15 February 2026 26 | Eibar | 2–1 | Racing Santander |

| 22 February 2026 27 | Racing Santander | 1–0 | Burgos |

| 28 February 2026 28 | Castellón | 1–3 | Racing Santander |

| 8 March 2026 29 | Racing Santander | 4–3 | Córdoba |

| 14 March 2026 30 | Cultural Leonesa | 1–2 | Racing Santander |

| 21 March 2026 31 | Racing Santander | 0–4 | Albacete |

| 29 March 2026 32 | Zaragoza | 2–0 | Racing Santander |

| 1 April 2026 33 | Racing Santander | 3–1 | Sporting Gijón |

| 5 April 2026 34 | Andorra | 6–2 | Racing Santander |

| 12 April 2026 35 | Racing Santander | 5–1 | Almería |

| 17 April 2026 36 | Real Sociedad B | 1–3 | Racing Santander |

| 26 April 2026 37 | Ceuta | 0–0 | Racing Santander |

| 3 May 2026 38 | Racing Santander | 4–2 | Huesca |

| 10 May 2026 39 | Leganés | 1–2 | Racing Santander |

| 16 May 2026 40 | Racing Santander | 4–1 | Valladolid |

| 24 May 2026 41 | Málaga | 1–1 | Racing Santander |

| 31 May 2026 42 | Racing Santander | 4–1 | Cádiz |

=== Copa del Rey ===
| 28 October 2025 First round | SD Logroñés | 0–4 | Racing Santander | Logroño |

| 4 December 2025 Second round | Ponferradina | 1–2 (a.e.t.) | Racing Santander | Ponferrada |

| 17 December 2025 Round of 32 | Racing Santander | 2–1 | Villarreal | Santander |
| | | | | Stadium: Campos de Sport de El Sardinero |

| 15 January 2026 Round of 16 | Racing Santander | 0–2 | Barcelona | Santander |
| | | | | Stadium: Campos de Sport de El Sardinero |
