= 2024–25 Racing de Santander season =

Racing de Santander
2024–25 season
- Owner: Sebastián Ceria
- President: Manolo Higuera
- Head coach: José Alberto
- Stadium: Campos de Sport de El Sardinero
- Segunda División: 5th
- Copa del Rey: Round of 32
- Average home league attendance: 20,212
Home colours	Away colours	Third colours

The 2024–25 season was the 112th season in the history of the Racing de Santander, and the club's third consecutive season in the Segunda División. In addition to the domestic league, the club participated in the Copa del Rey.

== Players ==
=== First-team squad ===
As of 3 February 2025

Note: Flags indicate national team as defined under FIFA eligibility rules; some limited exceptions apply. Players may hold more than one non-FIFA nationality.

No.	Pos.	Nation	Player
1	GK	ESP	Miquel Parera
2	DF	ESP	Álvaro Mantilla
3	DF	ESP	Saúl García
4	DF	ESP	Pol Moreno
5	DF	ESP	Javi Castro
6	MF	ESP	Íñigo Sainz-Maza (captain)
7	MF	CIV	Lago Júnior
8	MF	ESP	Aritz Aldasoro
9	FW	ESP	Juan Carlos Arana
10	MF	ESP	Iñigo Vicente
11	FW	ESP	Andrés Martín
12	MF	SEN	Maguette Gueye
13	GK	ESP	Jokin Ezkieta

No.	Pos.	Nation	Player
14	FW	ESP	Ekain Zenitagoia
15	MF	ESP	Marco Sangalli
16	FW	ESP	Rober González (on loan from NEC)
17	DF	FRA	Clément Michelin
18	DF	ESP	Manu Hernando
19	FW	ESP	Jon Karrikaburu (on loan from Real Sociedad)
20	FW	GAM	Suleiman Camara
21	MF	ESP	Unai Vencedor (on loan from Athletic Bilbao)
22	MF	ESP	Pablo Rodríguez (on loan from Lecce)
23	MF	ESP	Víctor Meseguer (on loan from Valladolid)
24	DF	ESP	Javi Montero
29	FW	ECU	Jeremy Arévalo
40	DF	ESP	Mario García

=== Reserve team ===
Note: Flags indicate national team as defined under FIFA eligibility rules; some limited exceptions apply. Players may hold more than one non-FIFA nationality.

No.	Pos.	Nation	Player
28	DF	ESP	Marco Carrascal
30	MF	ESP	Dani González
32	DF	ESP	Jorge Salinas
34	FW	ESP	Diego Díaz
36	DF	ESP	Ángel Pérez (on loan from Huesca)

No.	Pos.	Nation	Player
37	DF	ESP	Aitor Crespo
39	DF	ESP	Iñigo Gomeza
43	MF	ESP	Izan Yurrieta
44	MF	ESP	Mario Solórzano

=== Out on loan ===
Note: Flags indicate national team as defined under FIFA eligibility rules; some limited exceptions apply. Players may hold more than one non-FIFA nationality.

No.	Pos.	Nation	Player
—	MF	ESP	Neco Celorio (at Algeciras until 30 June 2025)
—	FW	ESP	Yeray Cabanzón (at Ponferradina until 30 June 2025)

== Transfers ==
=== In ===
Pos.	Player	Transferred from	Fee	Date	Source
FW	(Spain) Jon Karrikaburu	(Spain) Real Sociedad	Loan	20 July 2024	

=== Out ===
Pos.	Player	Transferred to	Fee	Date	Source
DF	(Spain) Germán Sánchez		End of contract	1 July 2024	
MF	(Spain) Peque Fernández	(Spain) Sevilla	€4,000,000	11 July 2024	

== Friendlies ==
=== Pre-season ===
17 July 2024 Friendly	Racing Santander	0–0	Alavés	Santander
19:00				Stadium: Campos de Sport de El Sardinero

24 July 2024 Friendly	Athletic Bilbao	2–1	Racing Santander
19:00

27 July 2024 Friendly	Racing Santander	0–0	Eibar
12:00

2 August 2024 Friendly	Racing Santander	2–0	Amorebieta
19:00

3 August 2024 Friendly	Real Oviedo	0–2	Racing Santander
18:30

== Competitions ==
=== Overall record ===
Competition	First match	Last match	Starting round	Record							
Competition	First match	Last match	Starting round	Pld	W	D	L	GF	GA	GD	Win %
Segunda División	18 August 2024	1 June 2025	Matchday 1	6	4	2	0	10	5	+5	66.67
Copa del Rey				0	0	0	0	0	0	+0	—
Total				6	4	2	0	10	5	+5	66.67

Last updated: 22 September 2024
Source: Soccerway

=== Segunda División ===
==== League table ====
Pos	Team	Pld	W	D	L	GF	GA	GD	Pts	Qualification or relegation
3	Oviedo (O, P)	42	21	12	9	56	42	+14	75 (Note: Oviedo finished ahead of Mirandés on head-to-head goal difference: Oviedo 4–1 Mirandés, Mirandés 1–0 Oviedo.)	Qualification for promotion playoffs
4	Mirandés	42	22	9	11	59	40	+19	75	Qualification for promotion playoffs
5	Racing Santander	42	20	11	11	65	51	+14	71	Qualification for promotion playoffs
6	Almería	42	19	12	11	72	55	+17	69	Qualification for promotion playoffs
7	Granada	42	18	11	13	65	54	+11	65	

Source: LaLiga Hypermotion
Rules for classification: 1) Points; 2) Head-to-head points; 3) Head-to-head goal difference; 4) Goal difference; 5) Goals scored; 6) Fair-play points
(Note: Head-to-head record is used only after all the matches between the teams in question have been played)
(O) Play-off winners; (P) Promoted

==== Results summary ====
Overall								Home						Away					
Pld	W	D	L	GF	GA	GD	Pts	W	D	L	GF	GA	GD	W	D	L	GF	GA	GD
38	19	9	10	59	44	+15	66	10	5	4	33	18	+15	9	4	6	26	26	0

Last updated: 4 May 2025.
Source: soccerway

==== Results by round ====
Round	1	2	3	4	5	6	7	8	9	10	11	12	13	14	15	16	17	18	19	20	21	22	23	24	25	26	27	28	29	30	31	32	33	34	35	36	37	38	39	40	41	42
Ground	H	H	A	A	H	A	H	A	H	A	H	A	H	A	H	A	H	A	H	A	H	A	H	A	H	A	H	A	H	A	H	A	H	A	H	A	H	A	H	A	A	H
Result	D	D	W	W	W	W	L	W	W	W	W	W	D	W	W	D	L	L	L	L	D	D	W	W	W	L	L	D	W	D	W	L	W	L	D	W	W	L	D	L	D	W
Position	12	12	4	3	2	1	3	1	1	1	1	1	1	1	1	1	1	1	1	2	3	3	2	1	1	1	2	3	1	4	2	4	3	3	3	3	3	3				

Updated to match(es) played on 4 May 2025. Source: worldfootball
A = Away; H = Home; W = Win; D = Draw; L = Loss

==== Matches ====
The match schedule was released on 26 June 2024.

23 August 2024 2	Racing Santander	2–2	Eibar	Santander
19:00				Stadium: Campos de Sport de El Sardinero

30 August 2024 3	Oviedo	1–3	Racing Santander	Oviedo
21:30				Stadium: Estadio Carlos Tartiere

6 September 2024 4	Tenerife	0–1	Racing Santander	Santa Cruz de Tenerife
21:00				Stadium: Estadio Heliodoro Rodríguez López

14 September 2024 5	Racing Santander	1–0	Sporting Gijón	Santander
18:30				Stadium: Campos de Sport de El Sardinero

22 September 2024 6	Castellón	0–1	Racing Santander	Castellón de la Plana
16:15			Martín 48' (pen.)	Stadium: Nou Estadi Castàlia

30 September 2024 7	Racing Santander	1–2	Cartagena	Santander
20:30	Andrés Martín 74'	Report	Luis Muñoz 45' (pen.); Jairo Izquierdo 58'; Valles (yellow card) 72'; Pedro Alcalá (yellow card) 81'; Musto (yellow card) 83'; Sergio Guerrero (yellow card) 90+4'	Stadium: Campos de Sport de El Sardinero; Attendance: 16,083; Referee: (Spain) Daniel Palencia Caballero

5 October 2024 8	Real Zaragoza	2–3	Racing Santander	Zaragoza
18:30	Francho Serrano (yellow card) 5'; Bernardo Vital (yellow card) 15'; Dani Tasende 57'; Mario Soberón 66'; Toni Moya (yellow card) 84'	Report	Manu Hernando (yellow card) 3' (yellow-red card) 51'; Pablo Rodríguez 33' (yellow card) 45+2'; Iñigo Vicente 40' (yellow card) 41'; Jokin Ezkieta (yellow card) 63'; Aritz Aldasoro 71'; Javi Montero (yellow card) 90+8'	Stadium: La Romareda; Attendance: 21,341; Referee: (Spain) Miguel Sesma Espinosa

13 October 2024 9	Racing Santander	1–0	Levante	Santander
16:15 CET	Iñigo Vicente (yellow card) 22' (goal) 81'; Saúl García (yellow card) 83'	Report	Adrián de la Fuente (yellow card) 30'; Roger Brugué (yellow card) 39'; Sergio Lozano (yellow card) 50'; Oriol Rey (yellow card) 90+7'	Stadium: Campos de Sport de El Sardinero; Attendance: 20,680; Referee: (Spain) José Luis Guzmán Mansilla

20 October 2024 10	Cádiz	0–1	Racing Santander	Cádiz
14:00 CET	Rubén Alcaraz (yellow card) 16'; Isaac Carcelén (yellow card) 50'; Chris Ramos (yellow card) 53'; Víctor Chust (yellow card) 90+4'; Iván Alejo (yellow card) 90+7'; Fali (yellow card) 90+8'	Report	Michelin (yellow card) 18'; Juan Carlos Arana 56'; Javi Castro (yellow card) 59'; Camara (yellow card) 90+7'	Stadium: Nuevo Mirandilla; Attendance: 15,545; Referee: (Spain) Dámaso Arcediano Monescillo

23 October 2024 11	Racing Santander	2–0	Córdoba	Santander
21:00 CET	Jon Karrikaburu (yellow card) 46'; Unai Vencedor (yellow card) 70'; Junior 73'; Ekain Zenitagoia 87'	Report	Álex Sala (yellow card) 23'; Carlos Albarrán (yellow card) 45+1'; Adrián Lapeña (yellow card) 49'; Antonio Casas (yellow card) 57'; Marvel (yellow card) 70'; Jacobo González (red card) 77'	Stadium: Campos de Sport de El Sardinero; Attendance: 16,036; Referee: (Spain) Eder Mallo Fernández

27 October 2024 12	Deportivo La Coruña	1–2	Racing Santander	A Coruña
16:15 CET	Dani Barcia (yellow card) 9'; Ximo Navarro (yellow card) 50'; Yeremay Hernández 65'	Report	Pablo Rodríguez 18'; Juan Carlos Arana 23'	Stadium: Abanca-Riazor; Attendance: 22,978; Referee: (Spain) Jon González Esteban

2 November 2024 13	Racing Santander	1–1	Albacete	Santander
18:30 CET	Marco Sangalli 22'; Aritz Aldasoro (yellow card) 84'; Jon Karrikaburu (yellow card) 89'	Report	Agus Medina (yellow card) 5'; Alberto Quiles 66'; Raúl Lizoain (yellow card) 83'; Álvaro Rodríguez (yellow card) 90+5'	Stadium: Campos de Sport de El Sardinero; Attendance: 20,794; Referee: (Spain) Andrés Fuentes Molina

10 November 2024 14	Racing de Ferrol	1–2	Racing Santander	Ferrol
16:15 CET	Chiki (yellow card) 50'; Eneko Jauregi 59'; Naldo (yellow card) 63'	Report	Andrés Martín 13'; Jon Karrikaburu 33'; Marco Sangalli (yellow card) 72'; Mario García (yellow card) 81'; Gueye (yellow card) 90+4'	Stadium: Estadio Municipal da Malata; Attendance: 7,018; Referee: (Spain) Miguel Sesma Espinosa

16 November 2024 15	Racing Santander	2–0	Burgos	Santander
18:30 CET	Marco Sangalli 12'; Javi Montero 24'; Manu Hernando (red card) 40'; Aritz Aldasoro (yellow card) 90+1'	Report	Aitor Córdoba (yellow card) 23'; Dani Ojeda (yellow card) 45+1'; Miguel (yellow card) 59'; Miguel Atienza (yellow card) 68'; Pipa (yellow card) 82'	Stadium: Campos de Sport de El Sardinero; Attendance: 21,043; Referee: (Spain) Saúl Ais Reig

23 November 2024 16	Málaga	0–0	Racing Santander	Málaga
21:00 CET	Luismi (yellow card) 42'; Carlos Puga (yellow card) 48'	Report	Marco Sangalli (yellow card) 23'; Álvaro Mantilla (yellow card) 40'; Iñigo Vicente (yellow card) 42'	Stadium: La Rosaleda Stadium; Attendance: 26,012; Referee: (Spain) Carlos Muñiz Muñoz

30 November 2024 17	Racing Santander	0–1	Mirandés	Santander
18:30 CET	Michelin (yellow card) 55'; Gueye (yellow card) 84'	Report	Víctor Parada (yellow card) 34'; Tachi (yellow card) 63' (yellow-red card) 76'; Jon Gorrotxategi (yellow card) 73'; Alberto Reina 89'	Stadium: Campos de Sport de El Sardinero; Attendance: 21,022; Referee: (Spain) Sergiu Claudiu Muresan

7 December 2024 18	Granada	3–0	Racing Santander	Granada
16:15 CET	Loïc Williams (yellow card) 18'; Gonzalo Villar 23'; Pablo Insua (yellow card) 34'; Uzuni 52' 76'; Hongla (yellow card) 54'; Tsitaishvili (yellow card) 76'; Reinier (yellow card) 64'	Report	Aritz Aldasoro (yellow card) 30'; Andrés Martín (yellow card) 53'; Juan Carlos Arana (yellow card) 58'	Stadium: Nuevo Estadio de Los Cármenes; Attendance: 16,345; Referee: (Spain) Manuel Pérez Hernández

15 December 2024 19	Racing Santander	0–1	Huesca	Santander
18:30 CET	Andrés Martín (yellow card) 36'; Gueye (yellow card) 59'	Report	Jorge Pulido (yellow card) 8'; Soko 68'; Joaquín Muñoz (yellow card) 73'; Gerard Valentín (yellow card) 83'	Stadium: Campos de Sport de El Sardinero; Attendance: 17,115; Referee: (Spain) Manuel Orellana Cid

19 December 2024 20	Elche	3–0	Racing Santander	Elche
19:00 CET	Álvarez 25' (yellow card) 36'; Mourad Daoudi 73'; Castro 90+6'	Report	Juan Carlos Arana (yellow card) 77'; Javi Montero (red card) 88'	Stadium: Estadio Martínez Valero; Attendance: 15,292; Referee: (Spain) Eder Mallo Fernández

22 December 2024 21	Racing Santander	2–2	Eldense	Santander
18:30 CET	Marco Sangalli (yellow card) 52'; Jon Karrikaburu 62'; Andrés Martín 70'	Report	Marc Mateu (yellow card) 22'; Álex Bernal (yellow card) 71'; Grigore 86'; Unai Ropero 90+2'	Stadium: Campos de Sport de El Sardinero; Attendance: 17,836; Referee: (Spain) José Luis Guzmán Mansilla

11 January 2025 22	Albacete	2–2	Racing Santander	Albacete
16:15 CET	Kofane 2'; Juan María Alcedo (yellow card) 20'; Lalo Aguilar (yellow card) 64' (yellow-red card) 90+1'; Jon Morcillo 68'; Raúl Lizoain (yellow card) 90+6'	Report	Saúl García (yellow card) 43'; Iñigo Vicente 71' (yellow card) 90+6'; Mario García (yellow card) 72'; Juan Carlos Arana 76'	Stadium: Estadio Carlos Belmonte; Attendance: 10,261; Referee: (Spain) Oliver De la Fuente Ramos

19 January 2025 23	Racing Santander	6–0	Racing de Ferrol	Santander
16:15 CET	Andrés Martín 18' (pen.); Javier Castro (yellow card) 24'; Juan Carlos Arana 36'; Marco Sangalli 42'; Pablo Rodríguez (yellow card) 45+3' (goal) 46' 64'; Jon Karrikaburu 73'	Report	Purić (yellow card) 41'	Stadium: Campos de Sport de El Sardinero; Attendance: 19,764; Referee: (Spain) Sergiu Claudiu Muresan

25 January 2025 24	Córdoba	1–2	Racing Santander	Córdoba
16:15 CET	Saúl García 5' (o.g.); Zidane (yellow card) 27'; Carlos Isaac (yellow card) 38'; Antonio Casas (yellow card) 73'	Report	Pablo Rodríguez 14'; Andrés Martín 63'; Javi Montero (yellow card) 85'; Unai Vencedor (yellow card) 90'	Stadium: Estadio Nuevo Arcángel; Attendance: 15,594; Referee: (Spain) Rubén Ávalos Barrera

1 February 2025 25	Racing Santander	2–1	Málaga	Santander
21:00 CET	Juan Carlos Arana 15' 28'; Javi Montero (yellow card) 58'; Marco Sangalli (yellow card) 78'; Víctor Meseguer (yellow card) 89'; Andrés Martín (yellow card) 90'	Report	Julen Lobete 6'; Manu Molina (yellow card) 19'; Dioni (yellow card) 22'; Gabilondo (yellow card) 36'; Álex Pastor (yellow card) 90+4'	Stadium: Campos de Sport de El Sardinero; Attendance: 21,872; Referee: (Spain) Eder Mallo Fernández

9 February 2025 26	Burgos	2–1	Racing Santander	Burgos
16:15 CET	Miguel Atienza (yellow card) 18'; Grego (yellow card) 53'; Álex Sancris 72'; Fer Niño 77' (yellow card) 90+5'; Curro Sánchez (yellow card) 79'; Barès (yellow card) 82'; Iñigo Córdoba (yellow card) 86'	Report	Javi Montero (yellow card) 36'; Víctor Meseguer (yellow card) 37'; Iñigo Vicente (yellow card) 62' (yellow-red card) 86'; Javier Castro 63'; Mario García (yellow card) 71'; Andrés Martín (yellow card) 90+2'	Stadium: Estadio El Plantío; Attendance: 10,564; Referee: (Spain) Manuel Orellana Cid

15 February 2025 27	Racing Santander	2–3	Cádiz	Santander
18:30 CET	Mario García (yellow card) 39'; Pablo Rodríguez 60'; Unai Vencedor (yellow card) 66'; Aritz Aldasoro (yellow card) 72'; Jon Karrikaburu 80'	Report	Javi Ontiveros (yellow card) 17' (goal) 40'; Kovačević (yellow card) 20'; Álex Fernández 51' (pen.); Chris Ramos 57'; Diakité (yellow card) 78'; Fede San Emeterio (yellow card) 80'; David Gil (yellow card) 90+3'	Stadium: Campos de Sport de El Sardinero; Attendance: 21,894; Referee: (Spain) Álvaro Moreno Aragón

22 February 2025 28	Eibar	2–2	Racing Santander	Eibar
16:15 CET	Jorge Pascual (yellow card) 4'; Jon Bautista 10' 62'; Peru Nolaskoain (yellow card) 38'; Aritz Arambarri (yellow card) 53'; Ander Madariaga (yellow card) 76'	Report	Juan Carlos Arana 31'; Javi Montero (yellow card) 34'; Andrés Martín 78'	Stadium: Ipurua Municipal Stadium; Attendance: 6,307; Referee: (Spain) Miguel Sesma Espinosa

2 March 2025 29	Racing Santander	2–0	Elche	Santander
21:00 CET	Juan Carlos Arana 5'; Aritz Aldasoro 23'; Iñigo Vicente (yellow card) 28'; Mario García (yellow card) 43'; Víctor Meseguer (yellow card) 62'	Report	Marc Aguado (yellow card) 16'; Mourad Daoudi (yellow card) 39'	Stadium: Campos de Sport de El Sardinero; Attendance: 20,134; Referee: (Spain) Daniel Palencia Caballero

8 March 2025 30	Sporting Gijón	1–1	Racing Santander	Gijón
18:30 CET	Dubasin 3'; Nacho Méndez (yellow card) 11'; Víctor Campuzano (yellow card) 77'; Kevin Vázquez (yellow card) 84'	Report	Rober (yellow card) 39'; Andrés Martín 58' (yellow card) 90+7'; Aritz Aldasoro (yellow card) 69'; Gueye (yellow card) 90+2'	Stadium: El Molinón; Attendance: 23,678; Referee: (Spain) Saúl Ais Reig

=== Copa del Rey ===
29 October 2024 First Round	Lanzarote	3-4	Racing Santander	Tías
21:00 CET	Matias Sosa (yellow card) 29'; Ale Fuentes 42' 78' 81'; Agoney Rodríguez (yellow card) 90+5'	Report	Jon Karrikaburu 32'; Ekain Zenitagoia 39'; Gueye (yellow card) 45+1'; Arévalo 74'; Camara 76'	Stadium: Municipal Pancho Bermúdez; Attendance: 800; Referee: (Spain) Rubén Ávalos Barrera

4 December 2024 Second Round	Racing Santander	1-0	Sporting Gijón	Santander
20:30 CET	Iñigo Vicente 78'	Report	César Gelabert (yellow card) 38'; Jesús Bernal (yellow card) 66'; Guille Rosas (yellow card) 90+4'	Stadium: Campos de Sport de El Sardinero; Attendance: 16,827; Referee: (Spain) Daniel Palencia Caballero

5 January 2025 Round of 32	Racing Santander	2-3	Celta Vigo	Santander
15:30 CET	Andrés Martín 8'; Pablo Rodríguez (yellow card) 31'; Álvaro Mantilla (red card) 35'; Javi Rodríguez 70' (o.g.); Juan Carlos Arana (yellow card) 76'; Iñigo Vicente (yellow card) 90+5'	Report	Alfon 20' 90+2'; Óscar Mingueza (yellow card) 32'; Fran Beltrán (yellow card) 40'; Hugo Sotelo (yellow card) 69'; Javier Castro 86' (o.g.); Swedberg (yellow card) 90'; Borja Iglesias (yellow card) 90+5'	Stadium: Campos de Sport de El Sardinero; Attendance: 20,312; Referee: (Spain) Pablo González Fuertes
