= 2023–24 Racing de Santander season =

Racing de Santander
2023–24 season
- President: Manolo Higuera
- Head coach: José Alberto
- Stadium: El Sardinero
- Segunda División: 7th
- Copa del Rey: First round
- Average home league attendance: 15,804

The 2023–24 season was Racing de Santander's 111th season in existence and second consecutive season in the Segunda División, the second division of association football in Spain. They also competed in the Copa del Rey.

== Players ==
=== First-team squad ===
As of 1 February 2024

Note: Flags indicate national team as defined under FIFA eligibility rules; some limited exceptions apply. Players may hold more than one non-FIFA nationality.

No.	Pos.	Nation	Player
1	GK	ESP	Miquel Parera
2	DF	ESP	Álvaro Mantilla
3	DF	ESP	Saúl García
4	DF	ESP	Pol Moreno
5	DF	ESP	Germán Sánchez
6	MF	ESP	Íñigo Sainz-Maza (captain)
7	MF	ESP	Marco Sangalli
8	MF	ESP	Jordi Mboula
9	FW	ESP	Juan Carlos Arana (on loan from Eibar)
10	MF	ESP	Iñigo Vicente
11	FW	ESP	Andrés Martín (on loan from Rayo Vallecano)
12	FW	CRO	Roko Baturina (on loan from Gil Vicente)

No.	Pos.	Nation	Player
13	GK	ESP	Jokin Ezkieta
14	FW	ESP	Ekain Zenitagoia
15	DF	ESP	Rubén Alves
16	MF	ESP	Iván Morante (on loan from Ibiza)
17	FW	ESP	Peque Fernández
18	DF	ESP	Manu Hernando
19	MF	FRA	Clément Grenier
20	MF	CIV	Lago Júnior
21	MF	ESP	Aritz Aldasoro
22	DF	ESP	Juan Gutiérrez
23	DF	ESP	Dani Fernández
40	DF	ESP	Mario García

=== Reserve team ===
Note: Flags indicate national team as defined under FIFA eligibility rules; some limited exceptions apply. Players may hold more than one non-FIFA nationality.

No.	Pos.	Nation	Player
26	FW	ESP	Álvaro Santamaría
29	FW	ESP	Jeremy Arévalo
30	DF	ESP	Mario Jorrín
31	GK	ESP	Germán Fernández

No.	Pos.	Nation	Player
32	MF	ESP	Diego Campo
33	MF	ESP	Marcos Bustillo
34	DF	ESP	Adrián Corral (on loan from Atlético Madrid B)
38	MF	ESP	Neco Celorio

=== Out on loan ===
Note: Flags indicate national team as defined under FIFA eligibility rules; some limited exceptions apply. Players may hold more than one non-FIFA nationality.

No.	Pos.	Nation	Player
—	DF	ESP	Diego Mirapeix (at Sestao River until 30 June 2024)
—	MF	ESP	Yeray Cabanzón (at Ponferradina until 30 June 2024)

No.	Pos.	Nation	Player
—	FW	NGR	Cedric Omoigui (at Ibiza until 30 June 2024)

== Transfers ==
=== In ===
Pos.	Player	Transferred from	Fee	Date	Source
MF	(Ivory Coast) Lago Junior	(Spain) Málaga	Free	1 July 2023	
FW	(Spain) Ekain Zenitagoia	(Spain) Ibiza	Free	1 July 2023	

=== Out ===
Pos.	Player	Transferred to	Fee	Date	Source
DF	(Spain) Eneko Satrústegui	(Poland) Wisła Kraków	Free	4 July 2023	

== Pre-season and friendlies ==
Win Draw Loss Fixtures

18 July 2023 Friendly	Oviedo	0–1	Racing Santander	Siero
19:00 CEST (UTC+2)				Stadium: Campo Municipal de Fútbol Sergio Sánchez López Pepio

27 July 2023 Friendly	Racing Santander	0–0	Athletic Bilbao	Sarón
19:00 CEST (UTC+2)				Stadium: Estadio Fernando Astobiza; Referee: Manuel Pozueta Rodríguez

29 July 2023 Friendly	Racing Santander	1–0	Huesca
19:00 CEST (UTC+2)

5 August 2023 Friendly	Racing Santander	0–0	Eibar	Galizano
11:30 CEST (UTC+2)				Stadium: Estadio Baceñuela

5 August 2023 Friendly	Racing Santander	1–0	Amorebieta	Laredo
19:00 CEST (UTC+2)				Stadium: Campo San Lorenzo

== Competitions ==
=== Overall record ===
Competition	First match	Last match	Starting round	Record							
Competition	First match	Last match	Starting round	Pld	W	D	L	GF	GA	GD	Win %
Segunda División	12 August 2023	2 June 2024	Matchday 1	28	12	6	10	42	39	+3	42.86
Copa del Rey	1 November 2023		First round	0	0	0	0	0	0	+0	—
Total				28	12	6	10	42	39	+3	42.86

Last updated: 24 February 2024
Source: Soccerway

=== Segunda División ===
==== League table ====
Pos	Team	Pld	W	D	L	GF	GA	GD	Pts	Qualification or relegation
5	Sporting Gijón	42	18	11	13	51	42	+9	65	Qualification for promotion play-offs
6	Oviedo	42	17	13	12	55	39	+16	64 (Note: Oviedo finished ahead of Racing Santander on overall goal difference)	Qualification for promotion play-offs
7	Racing Santander	42	18	10	14	63	55	+8	64	
8	Levante	42	13	20	9	49	45	+4	59 (Note: Levante finished ahead of Burgos, Racing Ferrol, and Elche on head-to-head points: Levante 12 pts, Burgos 8 pts, Racing Ferrol 8 pts, Elche 4 pts. Burgos finished ahead of Racing Ferrol on head-to-head points: Racing Ferrol 1–1 Burgos, Burgos 2–0 Racing Ferrol)	
9	Burgos	42	16	11	15	52	54	−2	59	

Updated to match(es) played on 2 Jun 2024. Source: LaLiga HyperMotion
Rules for classification: 1) Points; 2) Head-to-head points; 3) Head-to-head goal difference; 4) Goal difference; 5) Goals scored; 6) Fair-play points
(Note: Head-to-head record is used only after all the matches between the teams in question have been played)

==== Results summary ====
Overall								Home						Away					
Pld	W	D	L	GF	GA	GD	Pts	W	D	L	GF	GA	GD	W	D	L	GF	GA	GD
42	18	10	14	63	55	+8	64	13	3	5	36	21	+15	5	7	9	27	34	−7

Source: LALIGA HYPERMOTION

==== Results by round ====
Round	1	2	3	4	5	6	7	8	9	10	11	12	13	14	15	16	17	18	19	20	21	22	23	24	25	26	27	28
Ground	H	A	H	A	H	A	H	A	A	H	A	H	H	A	H	A	H	A	H	A	H	A	H	A	A	H	A	H
Result	W	L	D	D	W	D	W	L	L	W	W	W	L	L	L	W	W	D	D	D	W	L	L	L	W	W	L	W
Position	1	7	10	11	6	7	6	8	12	10	8	7	8	10	12	7	7	8	8	8	6	8	10	12	11	8	9	

Updated to match(es) played on 24 February 2024. Source: LALIGA HYPERMOTION
A = Away; H = Home; W = Win; D = Draw; L = Loss

==== Matches ====
The league fixtures were unveiled on 28 June 2023.

12 August 2023 1	Racing Santander	4–0	Eibar	Santander
19:00 CEST (UTC+2)	Vicente 22'; Aldasoro 24'; Fernández 38' (pen.); Sánchez (yellow card) 66'; Junior 72'; Mantilla (yellow card) 88'	Report	Tejero (yellow card) 4'; Arbilla (yellow card) 21'; Berrocal (yellow card) 36'	Stadium: Campos de Sport de El Sardinero; Attendance: 13,914; Referee: Iván Caparrós Hernández

19 August 2023 2	Espanyol	2–0	Racing Santander	Barcelona
19:00 CEST (UTC+2)	Milla 6', (yellow card) 55'; Braithwaite 68'	Report	Zenitagoia (yellow card) 2'; Aldasoro (yellow card) 47'	Stadium: Stage Front Stadium; Referee: Raúl Martín González Francés

28 August 2023 3	Racing Santander	0–0	Huesca	Santander
21:30 CEST (UTC+2)		Report		Stadium: Campos de Sport de El Sardinero; Attendance: 13,043; Referee: Miguel Sesma Espinosa

2 September 2023 4	Elche	1–1	Racing Santander	Elche
21:00 CEST (UTC+2)	Castro 30'	Report	Arana 53'	Stadium: Estadio Martínez Valero; Attendance: 13,051; Referee: Álvaro Moreno Aragón

10 September 2023 5	Racing Santander	1–0	Amorebieta	Santander
16:15 CEST (UTC+2)	Martín 10'	Report		Stadium: Campos de Sport de El Sardinero; Referee: Miguel González Díaz

15 September 2023 6	Zaragoza	1–1	Racing Santander	Zaragoza
21:30 CEST (UTC+2)	Valera 45+2'	Report	Grenier 40'	Stadium: La Romareda; Attendance: 27,208; Referee: José Luis Guzmán Mansilla

23 September 2023 7	Racing Santander	2–1	Albacete	Santander
21:00 CEST (UTC+2)	Arana 22'; Martín 29'; Grenier (yellow card) 50'; Aldasoro (yellow card) 65'	Report	Djetei (yellow card) 28'; Alonso (yellow card) 52'; Ros (yellow card) 55'; Marín 90'	Stadium: Campos de Sport de El Sardinero; Attendance: 13,563; Referee: Saúl Ais Reig

29 September 2023 8	Leganés	2–1	Racing Santander	Leganés
21:00 CEST (UTC+2)	Germán 28' (o.g.); Raba 52'	Report	Sangalli 90+2'	Stadium: Estadio Municipal de Butarque; Attendance: 8,953; Referee: Jon Ander González Esteban

3 October 2023 9	Tenerife	2–0	Racing Santander	Santa Cruz de Tenerife
20:30 WEST (UTC+1)	Ángel 63' (pen.), 65'	Report		Stadium: Estadio Heliodoro Rodríguez López; Referee: Rafael Sánchez López

7 October 2023 10	Racing Santander	3–2	Sporting Gijón	Santander
18:30 CEST (UTC+2)		Report		Stadium: Campos de Sport de El Sardinero; Referee: Iosu Galech Apezteguía

24 February 2024 28	Racing Santander	2–1	Leganés	Santander
16:15	Vicente 45+2'; Fernández 64' (pen.)		García 7'	Stadium: Campos de Sport de El Sardinero; Referee: Jon Ander González Esteban

21 April 2024 36	Racing Santander	v	Levante	Santander
				Stadium: Campos de Sport de El Sardinero
