= 2026–27 Racing de Santander season =

Racing de Santander
2026–27 season
- Owner: Sebastián Ceria
- President: Manolo Higuera
- Head coach: José Alberto
- Stadium: El Sardinero
- La Liga: 16th
- Copa del Rey: First round
Home colours	Away colours
- All statistics correct as of 19 September 2026.

The 2026–27 season is the 114th season in the history of Racing de Santander, and the club's first season back in La Liga since the 2011–12 campaign. In addition to the domestic league, the club is participating in the Copa del Rey.

== Players ==
=== Current squad ===
As of 2 September 2026

Note: Flags indicate national team as defined under FIFA eligibility rules; some limited exceptions apply. Players may hold more than one non-FIFA nationality.

No.	Pos.	Nation	Player
1	GK	SWE	Simon Eriksson
2	DF	ESP	Álvaro Mantilla (vice-captain)
3	DF	ESP	Aarón Martín
4	DF	ESP	Manu Hernando
5	DF	ESP	Pablo Ramón
6	MF	ESP	Íñigo Sainz-Maza (captain)
7	FW	GEO	Giorgi Guliashvili
8	MF	POR	André Almeida (on loan from Valencia)
9	FW	ESP	Juan Carlos Arana
10	MF	ESP	Iñigo Vicente
11	FW	ESP	Andrés Martín
12	FW	ESP	Asier Villalibre

No.	Pos.	Nation	Player
13	GK	ESP	Julen Agirrezabala
14	MF	SEN	Maguette Gueye
15	FW	ESP	Pablo García
16	DF	URU	Facundo González
17	DF	ESP	Jorge Salinas
18	MF	ITA	Matteo Prati (on loan from Cagliari)
19	FW	ESP	Iker Luque
20	MF	ESP	Sergio Canales
21	FW	MAR	Yassir Zabiri (on loan from Rennes)
22	DF	BRA	Pedro Felipe
23	MF	ESP	Iván Martín
24	DF	FRA	Jeanuël Belocian (on loan from Bayer Leverkusen)

=== Out on loan ===
Note: Flags indicate national team as defined under FIFA eligibility rules; some limited exceptions apply. Players may hold more than one non-FIFA nationality.

No.	Pos.	Nation	Player
—	GK	ESP	Jokin Ezkieta (at Cádiz until 30 June 2027)
—	MF	ESP	Aritz Aldasoro (at Oviedo until 30 June 2027)

No.	Pos.	Nation	Player
—	MF	ESP	Diego Díaz (at Andorra until 30 June 2027)

== Transfers ==
=== In ===
Date	Pos.	Nat.	Player	From	Fee	Ref.
19 May 2026	FW	(Spain)	Asier Villalibre	(Spain) Alavés	Transfer	
22 June 2026	MF	(Spain)	Sergio Canales	Free transfer		
4 August 2026	DF	(Brazil)	Pedro Felipe	(Italy) Juventus Next Gen	Transfer	
10 August 2026	GK	(Spain)	Julen Agirrezabala	(Spain) Athletic Bilbao	Transfer	
25 August 2026	MF	(Spain)	Pablo García	(Spain) Real Betis	Transfer	
31 August 2026	MF	(Spain)	Iker Luque	(Spain) Atlético Madrid	Transfer	
1 September 2026	DF	(Spain)	Aarón Martín	Free transfer		

==== Loans in ====
Date	Pos.	Nat.	Player	Club	From	Ref.
29 July 2026	FW	(Morocco)	Yassir Zabiri	(France) Rennes	End of season	
26 August 2026	MF	(Italy)	Matteo Prati	(Italy) Cagliari	End of season	
1 September 2026	MF	(Portugal)	André Almeida	(Spain) Valencia	End of season	
1 September 2026	DF	(France)	Jeanuël Belocian	(Germany) Bayer Leverkusen	End of season	

=== Out ===
Date	Pos.	Nat.	Player	To	Fee	Ref.
3 August 2026	MF	(The Gambia)	Suleiman Camara	(Slovakia) Slovan Bratislava	Transfer	
1 September 2026	MF	(Colombia)	Gustavo Puerta	(Greece) Olympiacos	€20 million	

==== Loans out ====
Date	Pos.	Nat.	Player	Club	To	Ref.
5 July 2026	GK	(Spain)	Jokin Ezkieta	(Spain) Cádiz	End of season	
9 July 2026	MF	(Spain)	Aritz Aldasoro	(Spain) Oviedo	End of season	

== Competitions ==
=== La Liga ===
==== League table ====
Pos	Team	Pld	W	D	L	GF	GA	GD	Pts
8	Villarreal	12	4	3	5	17	15	+2	15
9	Deportivo A Coruña	12	3	6	3	15	14	+1	15
10	Racing Santander	12	4	2	6	17	30	−13	14
11	Celta Vigo	12	2	7	3	10	10	0	13
12	Alavés	12	3	4	5	15	17	−2	13

Updated to match(es) played on 8 November 2026. Source: LaLiga EA Sports
Rules for classification: 1) Points; 2) Head-to-head points; 3) Head-to-head goal difference; 4) Goal difference; 5) Goals scored; 6) Fair-play points (if three or more teams tied); 7) Play-off at neutral site.
(Note: Head-to-head record is used only after all the matches between the teams in question have been played)

==== Matches ====
16 August 2026 1	Racing Santander	2–2	Villarreal	Santander
17:00 CEST (UTC+2)	Martín 21' (pen.); Canales 34'; Puerta (yellow card) 45+4'; Ramón (yellow card) 75'	Report	Gueye 45', (yellow card) 72'; Pépé 45+1'; Foyth (yellow card) 49'; Mouriño (yellow card) 87'; Romero (yellow card) 90+3'	Stadium: El Sardinero; Attendance: 22,413; Referee: Miguel Sesma Espinosa

23 August 2026 2	Getafe	1–0	Racing Santander	Getafe
19:30 CEST (UTC+2)	Sazonov (yellow card) 14'; Ünal 81'	Report	Salinas (yellow card) 12'; Mantilla (yellow card) 16'; Hernando (yellow card) 66'; A. Martín (penalty missed) 77'	Stadium: Coliseum; Attendance: 7,005; Referee: Juan Martínez Munuera

28 August 2026 3	Racing de Santander	3–2	Elche	Santander
19:00 CEST (UTC+2)	Zabiri 15', 21', 36'; González (yellow card) 43'; Mantilla (yellow card) 45'	Report	Buonanotte (yellow card) 63'; Sangaré 78'; Niño 79'	Stadium: El Sardinero; Attendance: 22,496; Referee: Carlos Muñiz Muñoz

5 September 2026 4	Rayo Vallecano	3–2	Racing de Santander	Leganés
18:30 CEST (UTC+2)	Valentini (yellow card) 2'; Rațiu 17'; Camello (yellow card) 39', (goal) 43', 47'; Lejeune (yellow card) 66'; Fran Pérez (yellow card) 86' (red card); Jorge de Frutos (yellow card) 89' (red card)	Report	Canales 4'; Zabiri (yellow card) 25'; García 28'; Vicente (yellow card) 35'	Stadium: Butarque Stadium; Attendance: 4,529; Referee: Alejandro Quintero González

12 September 2026 5	Racing de Santander	2–1	Deportivo Alavés	Santander
14:00 CEST (UTC+2)	Zabiri (yellow card) 35', (goal) 38', 53'; Salinas (yellow card) 62'; Almeida (yellow card) 89' (red card)	Report	Tenaglia (yellow card) 7'; Ibáñez (yellow card) 8'; Koski 18'; Blanco (yellow card) 62'	Stadium: Campos de Sport de El Sardinero; Attendance: 21,342; Referee: Javier Alberola Rojas

16 September 2026 6	Barcelona	7–2	Racing Santander	Barcelona
21:30 CEST (UTC+2)	Cancelo 8', (yellow card) 69'; Raphinha 25' (pen.), 42', 67' (pen.); Villalibre 36' (o.g.); Yamal (penalty missed) 45', (yellow card) 45+5', (goal) 89'; Adeyemi (yellow card) 60'; Gabriel Jesus 79'	Report	Pedro Felipe (yellow card) 23'; Gueye 30'; Zabiri (yellow card) 60', (goal) 65'	Stadium: Camp Nou; Attendance: 50,568; Referee: José Luis Munuera Montero

19 September 2026 7	Celta Vigo	5–0	Racing Santander	Vigo
18:30 CEST (UTC+2)	González 32'; Moriba 43'; Rueda (yellow card) 45+3'; Román 69'; Lago (yellow card) 73'; Durán 78', 90+2'	Report	Zabiri (yellow card) 57'; Belocian (yellow card) 64'; Ramón (yellow card) 75'; Canales (yellow card) 90'; Vicente (yellow card) 90+3'	Stadium: Balaídos Stadium; Attendance: 19,505; Referee: Ricardo de Burgos Bengoetxea

11 October 2026 8	Racing Santander	2–2	Valencia	Santander
21:00 CEST (UTC+2)	Ramón (yellow card) 22'; Zabiri 32'; Salinas (yellow card) 45+2'; I. Martín 47'; A. Martín (yellow card) 90+2'	Report	Raba 2', (yellow card) 45+4'; Rodríguez (yellow card) 45+2'; Otorbi 65'; Maffeo (yellow card) 72'	Stadium: Estadio El Sardinero; Attendance: 22,633; Referee: Luis Bestard Servera

18 October 2026 9	Osasuna	2–0	Racing de Santander	Pamplona
14:00 CEST (UTC+2)	Budimir 9' (pen.), (yellow card) 60'; Rosier (yellow card) 28'; Osambela 88'	Report	Mantilla (yellow card) 6'; Salinas (yellow card) 51'; I. Martín (yellow card) 80'	Stadium: El Sadar Stadium; Attendance: 20,818; Referee: Juan Martínez Munuera

24 October 2026 10	Racing de Santander	2–1	Espanyol	Santander
16:15 CEST (UTC+2)	Vicente (yellow card) 8'; Ramón (yellow card) 67'; Belocian 69'; Zabiri 84'; Salinas (yellow card) 90+7'	Report	Lozano (yellow card) 17'; Expósito 62', (yellow card) 90'; Fortuño (yellow card) 69'; González (yellow card) 70'; Puado (yellow card) 89'	Stadium: Campos de Sport de El Sardinero; Attendance: 21,437; Referee: Jesús Gil Manzano

1 November 2026 11	Racing de Santander	0–3	Real Madrid	Santander
15:15 CET (UTC+1)	Belocian (yellow card) 34'; Luque (yellow card) 45+1'	Report	Mbappé 11' (pen.); Bellingham 21'; Diomande 36'	Stadium: El Sardinero; Attendance: 22,892; Referee: José Luis Munuera Montero

7 November 2026 12	Málaga CF	1–2	Racing de Santander	Málaga
13:00 CET (UTC+1)	Dotor 28', (yellow card) 90'; Aznou (yellow card) 38' (yellow-red card) 64'; Galilea (yellow card) 45+1'; Niño (yellow card) 76'; Chupete (yellow card) 80'	Report	Agirrezabala (yellow card) 31'; Luque 50'; Zabiri 60'; Guliashvili (yellow card) 90+1'	Stadium: Estadio La Rosaleda; Attendance: 28,334; Referee: Isidro Díaz de Mera

22 November 2026 13	Racing de Santander	v	Real Sociedad

27 November 2026	Levante UD	v	Racing de Santander

6 December 2026	Racing de Santander	v	Deportivo de A Coruña

13 December 2026	Real Betis	v	Racing de Santander

20 December 2026	Sevilla FC	v	Racing de Santander

3 January 2027	Racing de Santander	v	Athletic Bilbao

10 January 2027	Atlético Madrid	v	Racing de Santander

17 January 2027	Racing de Santander	v	CA Osasuna

24 January 2027	Racing de Santander	v	RC Celta de Vigo

31 January 2027	Villarreal CF	v	Racing de Santander

7 February 2027	Valencia CF	v	Racing de Santander

14 February 2027	Racing de Santander	v	Getafe CF

21 February 2027	Deportivo Alavés	v	Racing de Santander

28 February 2027	Racing de Santander	v	Rayo Vallecano

7 March 2027	RCD Espanyol	v	Racing de Santander

14 March 2027	Racing de Santander	v	Atlético Madrid

21 March 2027	Racing de Santander	v	Real Betis

4 April 2027	Athletic Bilbao	v	Racing de Santander

11 April 2027	Racing de Santander	v	FC Barcelona

18 April 2027	Real Sociedad	v	Racing de Santander

21 April 2027	Racing de Santander	v	Málaga CF

2 May 2027	Deportivo de A Coruña	v	Racing de Santander

9 May 2027	Racing de Santander	v	Sevilla FC

16 May 2027	Real Madrid CF	v	Racing de Santander

23 May 2027	Racing de Santander	v	Levante UD

30 May 2027	Elche CF	v	Racing de Santander

=== Copa del Rey ===
29 October 2026	Ribadesella	0–2	Racing Santander	Ribadesella
21:00		Report	Villalibre 48', 63'	Stadium: Oreyana
