= 2022–23 Racing de Santander season =

Racing de Santander
2022–23 season
- President: Alfredo Pérez Fernández
- Head coach: Guillermo Fernández Romo (until 12 December); José Alberto (from 13 December)
- Stadium: El Sardinero
- Segunda División: 12th
- Copa del Rey: Second round
- Top goalscorer: League: Iñigo Vicente (7); All: Iñigo Vicente (7)

The 2022–23 season was Racing de Santander's 110th season in existence and the club's first season back in the second division of Spanish football since 2020. In addition to the domestic league, Racing Santander participated in this season's edition of the Copa del Rey. The season covered the period from 1 July 2022 to 30 June 2023.

== Players ==
=== Current squad ===
As of 31 January 2023.

Note: Flags indicate national team as defined under FIFA eligibility rules; some limited exceptions apply. Players may hold more than one non-FIFA nationality.

No.	Pos.	Nation	Player
1	GK	(Spain) ESP	Miquel Parera
2	DF	(Spain) ESP	Álvaro Mantilla
3	DF	(Spain) ESP	Eneko Satrústegui
4	DF	(Spain) ESP	Pol Moreno
5	DF	(Spain) ESP	Pablo Bobadilla
6	DF	(Spain) ESP	Íñigo Sainz-Maza (captain)
8	MF	(Spain) ESP	Fausto Tienza
9	FW	(Nigeria) NGA	Cedric Omoigui
10	FW	(Spain) ESP	Iñigo Vicente
11	FW	(Croatia) CRO	Roko Baturina (on loan from Ferencváros)
12	FW	(Senegal) SEN	Sekou Gassama (on loan from Valladolid)
13	GK	(Spain) ESP	Jokin Ezkieta
14	FW	(Spain) ESP	Jordi Mboula (on loan from Mallorca)

No.	Pos.	Nation	Player
15	DF	(Spain) ESP	Rubén Alves
16	DF	(Spain) ESP	Germán Sánchez
17	DF	(Spain) ESP	Unai Medina
18	DF	(Spain) ESP	Saúl García
19	FW	(Brazil) BRA	Matheus Aiás
20	MF	(Colombia) COL	Juergen Elitim (on loan from Watford)
21	MF	(Spain) ESP	Aritz Aldasoro
22	MF	(Spain) ESP	Arturo Molina
23	DF	(Spain) ESP	Dani Fernández
24	MF	(Spain) ESP	Jorge Pombo
25	MF	(Spain) ESP	Marco Sangalli
29	FW	(Spain) ESP	Peque Fernández

=== Reserve team ===
Note: Flags indicate national team as defined under FIFA eligibility rules; some limited exceptions apply. Players may hold more than one non-FIFA nationality.

No.	Pos.	Nation	Player
26	FW	(Brazil) BRA	Dalisson de Almeida
27	MF	(Spain) ESP	Dani González
28	FW	(Spain) ESP	Jorge Delgado
30	DF	(Spain) ESP	Mario Jorrín

No.	Pos.	Nation	Player
31	GK	(Spain) ESP	Germán Fernández
41	MF	(Spain) ESP	Yeray Cabanzón
45	FW	(Morocco) MAR	Ayoub Jabbari

=== Out on loan ===
Note: Flags indicate national team as defined under FIFA eligibility rules; some limited exceptions apply. Players may hold more than one non-FIFA nationality.

No.	Pos.	Nation	Player
—	DF	(Spain) ESP	Juan Gutiérrez (at Ceuta until 30 June 2023)
—	MF	(Spain) ESP	Marco Camus (at Córdoba until 30 June 2023)

No.	Pos.	Nation	Player
—	MF	(Spain) ESP	Marcos Bustillo (at La Nucía until 30 June 2023)

== Pre-season and friendlies ==
Win Draw Loss

== Competitions ==
=== Overview ===
Competition	First match	Last match	Starting round	Final position	Record							
Competition	First match	Last match	Starting round	Final position	Pld	W	D	L	GF	GA	GD	Win %
Segunda División	14 August 2022	28 May 2023	Matchday 1	12th	42	14	12	16	39	40	−1	33.33
Copa del Rey	22 December 2022		Second round	Second round	1	0	0	1	0	1	−1	0.00
Total					43	14	12	17	39	41	−2	32.56

Source: Competitions

=== Segunda División ===
==== League table ====
Pos	Team	Pld	W	D	L	GF	GA	GD	Pts
10	Tenerife	42	14	15	13	42	37	+5	57
11	Burgos	42	13	15	14	33	35	−2	54 (Note: Burgos finished ahead of Racing Santander on head-to-head points: Racing Santander 0–1 Burgos, Burgos 2–1 Racing Santander.)
12	Racing Santander	42	14	12	16	39	40	−1	54
13	Zaragoza	42	12	17	13	40	39	+1	53 (Note: Zaragoza finished ahead of Leganés on head-to-head goal difference: Leganés 2–1 Zaragoza, Zaragoza 3–0 Leganés.)
14	Leganés	42	14	11	17	37	42	−5	53

Source: LaLiga SmartBank
Rules for classification: 1) points; 2) head-to-head points; 3) head-to-head goal difference; 4) goal difference; 5) number of goals scored
Notes:

Notes

1. Reserve teams are not eligible for promotion to the same league as the first team.

==== Results summary ====
Overall								Home						Away					
Pld	W	D	L	GF	GA	GD	Pts	W	D	L	GF	GA	GD	W	D	L	GF	GA	GD
42	14	12	16	39	40	−1	54	9	6	6	22	16	+6	5	6	10	17	24	−7

==== Results by round ====
Round	1	2	3	4	5	6	7	8	9	10	11	12	13	14	15	16	17	18	19	20	21	22	23	24	25	26	27	28	29	30	31	32	33	34	35	36	37	38	39	40	41	42
Ground	H	A	H	A	A	H	A	H	A	H	A	H	A	H	A	H	A	H	A	H	A	A	H	A	H	A	H	A	H	A	H	A	H	A	H	A	H	H	A	H	A	H
Result	L	L	L	L	W	D	L	D	W	W	D	D	D	D	W	L	L	L	L	L	W	D	W	L	D	D	W	L	W	W	D	D	L	L	W	L	W	W	D	W	L	W
Position	22	21	22	22	20	20	21	20	19	15	15	17	16	16	14	15	17	18	18	19	18	19	18	18	18	18	18	18	18	14	16	17	17	18	18	18	18	16	16	15	16	12

A = Away; H = Home; W = Win; D = Draw; L = Loss

==== Matches ====
The league fixtures were announced on 23 June 2022.

14 August 2022 1	Racing Santander	0–2	Villarreal B	Santander
CEST (UTC+2)				Stadium: El Sardinero

20 August 2022 2	Granada	2–0	Racing Santander	Granada
CEST (UTC+2)

28 August 2022 3	Racing Santander	0–1	Oviedo	Santander
CEST (UTC+2)				Stadium: El Sardinero

3 September 2022 4	Tenerife	1–0	Racing Santander	Tenerife
CEST (UTC+2)

11 September 2022 5	Sporting Gijón	0–2	Racing Santander	Gijón
CEST (UTC+2)

18 September 2022 6	Racing Santander	0–0	Las Palmas	Santander
CEST (UTC+2)				Stadium: El Sardinero

25 September 2022 7	Eibar	2–1	Racing Santander	Eibar
CEST (UTC+2)

1 October 2022 8	Racing Santander	0–0	Málaga	Santander
CEST (UTC+2)				Stadium: El Sardinero

9 October 2022 9	Levante	0–1	Racing Santander	Valencia
CEST (UTC+2)

12 October 2022 10	Racing Santander	1–0	Zaragoza	Santander
CEST (UTC+2)				Stadium: El Sardinero

15 October 2022 11	Huesca	0–0	Racing Santander	Huesca
CEST (UTC+2)

23 October 2022 12	Racing Santander	1–1	Ponferradina	Santander
CEST (UTC+2)				Stadium: El Sardinero

29 October 2022 13	Leganés	0–0	Racing Santander	Leganés
CEST (UTC+2)				Stadium: Butarque

1 November 2022 14	Racing Santander	1–1	Alavés	Santander
CET (UTC+1)				Stadium: El Sardinero

5 November 2022 15	Andorra	0–1	Racing Santander	Andorra la Vella
CET (UTC+1)				Stadium: Estadi Nacional

20 November 2022 16	Racing Santander	0–1	Burgos	Santander
CET (UTC+1)				Stadium: El Sardinero

26 November 2022 17	Albacete	2–1	Racing Santander	Albacete
CET (UTC+1)				Stadium: Carlos Belmonte

4 December 2022 18	Racing Santander	0–1	Lugo	Santander
CET (UTC+1)				Stadium: El Sardinero

8 December 2022 19	Ibiza	1–0	Racing Santander	Ibiza
CET (UTC+1)				Stadium: Estadi Municipal de Can Misses

11 December 2022 20	Racing Santander	1–2	Mirandés	Santander
CET (UTC+1)				Stadium: El Sardinero

17 December 2022 21	Cartagena	0–3	Racing Santander	Cartagena
CET (UTC+1)				Stadium: Estadio Cartagonova

8 January 2023 22	Las Palmas	1–1	Racing Santander	Las Palmas
CET (UTC+1)				Stadium: Estadio Gran Canaria

14 January 2023 23	Racing Santander	2–0	Sporting Gijón	Santander
CET (UTC+1)				Stadium: El Sardinero

21 January 2023 24	Alavés	3–0	Racing Santander	Vitoria-Gasteiz
CET (UTC+1)				Stadium: Mendizorrotza

27 January 2023 25	Racing Santander	1–1	Tenerife	Santander
CET (UTC+1)				Stadium: El Sardinero

5 February 2023 26	Ponferradina	1–1	Racing Santander	Ponferrada
CET (UTC+1)				Stadium: El Toralín

13 February 2023 27	Racing Santander	2–1	Leganés	Santander
CET (UTC+1)				Stadium: El Sardinero

19 February 2023 28	Villarreal B	2–1	Racing Santander	Villarreal
21:00 CET (UTC+1)				Stadium: Estadio de la Cerámica

25 February 2023 29	Racing Santander	2–1	Andorra	Santander
CET (UTC+1)				Stadium: El Sardinero

5 March 2023 30	Málaga	0–1	Racing Santander	Málaga
CET (UTC+1)				Stadium: La Rosaleda

13 March 2023 31	Racing Santander	1–1	Huesca	Santander
CET (UTC+1)				Stadium: El Sardinero

19 March 2023 32	Lugo	1–1	Racing Santander	Lugo
CET (UTC+1)				Stadium: Anxo Carro

25 March 2023 33	Racing Santander	0–1	Levante	Santander
CET (UTC+1)				Stadium: El Sardinero

1 April 2023 34	Burgos	2–1	Racing Santander	Burgos
CEST (UTC+2)	Muñoz 43'; Sánchez 51'		Elitim 76'	Stadium: Estadio El Plantío

8 April 2023 35	Racing Santander	4–1	Albacete	Santander
CEST (UTC+2)				Stadium: El Sardinero

15 April 2023 36	Zaragoza	4–1	Racing Santander	Zaragoza
CEST (UTC+2)				Stadium: La Romareda

23 April 2023 37	Racing Santander	1–0	Granada	Santander
CEST (UTC+2)	Baturina 52'			Stadium: El Sardinero

28 April 2023 38	Racing Santander	1–0	Ibiza	Santander
CEST (UTC+2)	Baturina 30'			Stadium: El Sardinero

6 May 2023 39	Mirandés	1–1	Racing Santander	Miranda de Ebro
CEST (UTC+2)				Stadium: Anduva

14 May 2023 40	Racing Santander	1–0	Eibar	Santander
14:00 CEST (UTC+2)	Vicente 43'			Stadium: El Sardinero; Referee: Dámaso Arcediano Monescillo

21 May 2023 41	Oviedo	1–0	Racing Santander	Oviedo
16:15 CEST (UTC+2)	Calvo 21'			Stadium: Carlos Tartiere; Referee: Saúl Ais Reig

28 May 2023 42	Racing Santander	3–1	Cartagena	Santander
16:15 CEST (UTC+2)				Stadium: El Sardinero

=== Copa del Rey ===
22 December 2022 Second round	Linares	1–0	Racing Santander	Linares
19:00 CET (UTC+1)	Corral 90+2'	Report		Stadium: Linarejos; Referee: Álvaro Moreno Aragón
