= Andrés Martín (footballer) =

Spanish footballer

Personal information
- Full name: Andrés Martín García
- Date of birth: 11 July 1999 (age 27)
- Place of birth: Aguadulce, Spain
- Height: 1.70 m (5 ft 7 in)
- Position: Forward

Team information
- Current team: Racing Santander
- Number: 11

Youth career
- Antequera
- 2016–2018: Córdoba

Senior career*
Years	Team	Apps	(Gls)
2017–2018	Córdoba B	29	(6)
2018–2019	Córdoba	29	(6)
2019–2024	Rayo Vallecano	81	(6)
2022	→ Tenerife (loan)	20	(2)
2023–2024	→ Racing Santander (loan)	23	(6)
2024–	Racing Santander	82	(39)

International career^{‡}
2019–2020	Spain U21	7	(0)
- * Club domestic league appearances and goals as of 31 May 2026 ‡ National team caps and goals as of 20 September 2020

Andrés Martín García (born 11 July 1999) is a Spanish professional footballer who plays as a forward for Racing de Santander.

== Club career ==
Born in Aguadulce, Seville, Andalusia, Martín joined Córdoba CF's youth setup in 2016, from Antequera CF. He made his senior debut with the reserves on 20 August 2017, playing the last six minutes in a 2–1 Segunda División B away loss against Extremadura UD.

Martín scored his first senior goal on 1 November 2017, netting the equalizer in a 1–1 home draw against Real Balompédica Linense. The following 21 June, after featuring regularly for the B-team during the campaign, he extended his contract with the club, and featured with the main squad during the whole pre-season.

Martín made his professional debut on 9 September 2018, coming on as a second-half substitute for Alejandro Alfaro in a 0–0 home draw against AD Alcorcón in the Segunda División championship. Three days later he scored his first professional goal, netting the opener in a 2–0 home win against Gimnàstic de Tarragona, in the season's Copa del Rey.

On 26 June 2019, after suffering relegation, Martín signed a five-year contract with Rayo Vallecano, now also in the second division. He helped the Madrid side to achieve promotion to La Liga in the 2020–21 season, scoring four times.

Martín made his top tier debut on 15 August 2021, replacing Óscar Valentín in a 0–3 away loss against Sevilla FC. The following 27 January, after featuring rarely, he was loaned to CD Tenerife in division two, until June.

Back to Rayo for the 2022–23 season, Martín again featured rarely, and was loaned to second division side Racing de Santander on 31 August 2023. The following 2 August, he signed a permanent four-year deal with the Verdiblancos.

== Career statistics ==
=== Club ===
As of match played 31 May 2026

Appearances and goals by club, season and competition
Club	Season	League			National Cup		Other		Total	
Club	Season	Division	Apps	Goals	Apps	Goals	Apps	Goals	Apps	Goals
Córdoba B	2017–18	Segunda División B	26	5	—		—		26	5
Córdoba B	2018–19	Tercera División	3	0	—		—		3	0
Córdoba B	Total		29	5	—		—		29	5
Córdoba	2018–19	Segunda División	29	6	3	1	—		32	7
Rayo Vallecano	2019–20	Segunda División	27	2	4	1	—		31	3
Rayo Vallecano	2020–21	Segunda División	38	4	2	1	4 (Note: Appearance(s) in Promotion Playoffs)	1	44	6
Rayo Vallecano	2021–22	La Liga	7	0	4	1	—		11	1
Rayo Vallecano	2022–23	La Liga	9	0	1	0	—		10	0
Rayo Vallecano	Total		81	6	11	3	4	1	96	10
Tenerife (loan)	2021–22	Segunda División	16	2	—		4	0	20	2
Racing Santander (loan)	2023–24	Segunda División	23	6	1	1	—		24	7
Racing Santander	2024–25	Segunda División	41	16	1	1	2	1	44	18
Racing Santander	2025–26	Segunda División	41	23	2	0	—		43	23
Racing Santander	2026–27	La Liga	0	0	0	0	—		0	0
Racing Santander	Racing total		105	45	4	2	2	1	111	48
Career total			260	64	18	6	10	2	288	72

== Honours ==
Rayo Vallecano

- Segunda División play-offs: 2021

Racing Santander

- Segunda División: 2025–26

Individual

- Segunda División Player of the Month: August 2024
- Zarra Trophy: 2024–25
