= Aguadulce =

The name Aguadulce may refer to:

- Aguadulce, Seville, municipality in Seville.
- Aguadulce, Coclé, agricultural city and corregimiento in Panama.
- Aguadulce (Almería), town in Roquetas de Mar.
