= Diego Fuentes =

Diego Fuentes may refer to:

- Diego Fuentes (actor), Canadian actor
- Diego Fuentes (footballer), Spanish football winger
