= Marco Carrascal =

Spanish footballer (born 2003)

Personal information
- Full name: Marco Carrascal García
- Date of birth: 11 April 2003 (age 23)
- Place of birth: Soto de la Marina, Spain
- Height: 1.80 m (5 ft 11 in)
- Position: Centre-back

Team information
- Current team: Cartagena
- Number: 24

Youth career
- Marina Sport
- Racing Santander

Senior career*
Years	Team	Apps	(Gls)
2021–2025	Racing B	91	(2)
2024–2025	Racing Santander	3	(0)
2025–	Cartagena	0	(0)
- * Club domestic league appearances and goals as of 24 September 2025

Marco Carrascal García (born 11 April 2003) is a Spanish professional footballer who plays as a centre-back for Primera Federación club Cartagena.

== Career ==
Carrascal was born in Soto de la Marina, Cantabria, and joined Racing de Santander's youth setup from CD Marina Sport. He made his senior debut with the reserves on 7 February 2021, starting in a 2–0 Tercera División away win over CD Barquereño.

Carrascal made his first team debut on 13 October 2024, coming on as a late substitute for Iñigo Vicente in a 1–0 Segunda División home win over Levante UD.

On 28 July 2025, Carrascal signed a one-season contract with Cartagena, recently relegated to Primera Federación. Before he made his debut for Cartagena on the pitch, on 10 September 2025 he suffered tibia and fibula fracture in training.
