= Jeremy Arévalo =

Ecuadorian footballer

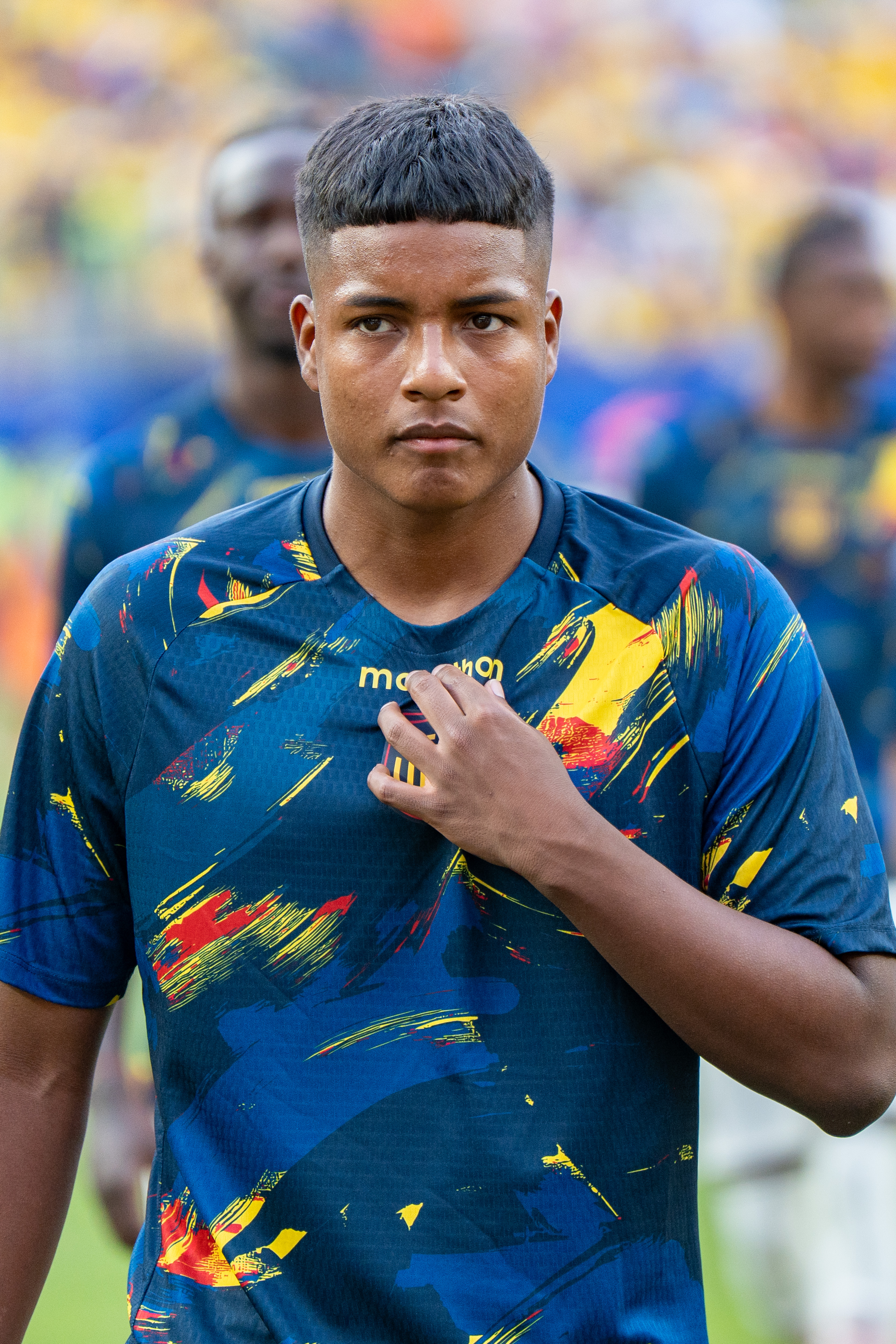
- Arévalo with Ecuador in 2026

Personal information
- Full name: Jeremy Alberto Arévalo Mera
- Date of birth: 19 March 2005 (age 21)
- Place of birth: Maliaño, Spain
- Height: 1.82 m (6 ft 0 in)
- Position: Forward

Team information
- Current team: Estrela da Amadora (on loan from VfB Stuttgart)
- Number: 29

Youth career
- –2022: Racing Santander

Senior career*
| Years | Team | Apps | (Gls) |
| 2022–2024 | Racing B | 56 | (6) |
| 2023–2026 | Racing Santander | 37 | (8) |
| 2026– | VfB Stuttgart | 7 | (0) |
| 2026– | VfB Stuttgart II | 4 | (5) |

International career^{‡}
| 2023 | Spain U18 | 3 | (1) |
| 2024 | Ecuador U20 | 1 | (0) |
| 2025– | Ecuador | 3 | (0) |
- * Club domestic league appearances and goals as of 30 May 2026 ‡ National team caps and goals as of 22:24, 31 March 2026 (UTC)

Jeremy Alberto Arévalo Mera (born 19 March 2005) is a professional footballer who plays as a forward for Primeira Liga club Estrela da Amadora, on loan from Bundesliga club VfB Stuttgart. Born in Spain, he plays for the Ecuador national team.

== Club career ==
=== Racing Santander ===
Born in Maliaño, Cantabria, to Ecuadorian parents, Arévalo was a Racing de Santander youth graduate. He made his senior debut with the reserves at the age of 16 on 8 January 2022, coming on as a late substitute in a 3–0 Segunda División RFEF away loss against CD Laredo.

Arévalo was handed his first start on 15 October 2022, and scored the winner in a 1–0 away success over Bergantiños FC. On 3 December, he scored a brace in a 2–0 win at Laredo.

Arévalo made his professional debut on 12 August 2023, replacing goalscorer Aritz Aldasoro late into a 4–0 Segunda División home routing over SD Eibar.

=== VfB Stuttgart ===
On 2 January 2026, he signed a five-and-a-half-year-deal with VfB Stuttgart. Arévalo made his club debut eight days later, in a 4–1 Bundesliga victory over Bayer Leverkusen.

==== Loan to Estrela da Amadora ====
On 4 September 2026, he joined Portuguese Primeira Liga club Estrela da Amadora, on loan for the 2026–27 season.

== International career ==
Eligible to play for Ecuador or Spain, Arévalo represented the latter at under-18 level. He was called up to the Ecuador U20s for the 2025 South American U-20 Championship. He was called up to the senior Ecuador national team for a set of friendlies in November 2025.

On 31 May 2026, Arévalo was selected in the 26-man squad for the 2026 FIFA World Cup.

== Career statistics ==
=== Club ===
As of match played 12 April 2026

Appearances and goals by club, season and competition
| Club | Season | League | | | Cup | | Other | | Total | |
| Club | Season | Division | Apps | Goals | Apps | Goals | Apps | Goals | Apps | Goals |
|---|---|---|---|---|---|---|---|---|---|---|
| Racing B | 2021–22 | Segunda Federación | 1 | 0 | — | | — | | 1 | 0 |
| Racing B | 2022–23 | Segunda Federación | 32 | 5 | — | | — | | 32 | 5 |
| Racing B | 2023–24 | Segunda Federación | 23 | 1 | — | | 1 (Note: Appearance in 2024 Segunda Federación play-offs) | 0 | 24 | 1 |
| Racing B | Total | | 56 | 6 | — | | 1 | 0 | 57 | 6 |
| Racing Santander | 2023–24 | Segunda División | 12 | 0 | — | | — | | 12 | 0 |
| Racing Santander | 2024–25 | Segunda División | 7 | 0 | 2 | 0 | 1 (Note: Appearance in La Liga play-offs) | 0 | 10 | 0 |
| Racing Santander | 2025–26 | Segunda División | 18 | 8 | 0 | 0 | — | | 18 | 8 |
| Racing Santander | Total | | 37 | 8 | 2 | 0 | 1 | 0 | 42 | 8 |
| VfB Stuttgart | 2025–26 | Bundesliga | 7 | 0 | — | | — | | 7 | 0 |
| Career total | | | 100 | 14 | 2 | 0 | 2 | 0 | 104 | 14 |

=== International ===
As of match played 31 March 2026

Appearances and goals by national team and year
| National team | Year | Apps | Goals |
|---|---|---|---|
| Ecuador | 2025 | 1 | 0 |
| Ecuador | 2026 | 2 | 0 |
| Total | | 3 | 0 |

== Honors ==
Individual

- Segunda División Player of the Month: October 2025
