= Laro Gómez =

Spanish footballer (born 2006)

Personal information
- Full name: Laro Gómez Rodríguez
- Date of birth: 16 October 2006 (age 20)
- Place of birth: Santander, Spain
- Position: Goalkeeper

Team information
- Current team: Racing B
- Number: 13

Youth career
- Racing Santander

Senior career*
| Years | Team | Apps | (Gls) |
| 2024– | Racing B | 18 | (0) |
| 2024–2025 | → Escobedo (loan) | 23 | (0) |
| 2026– | Racing Santander | 1 | (0) |
- * Club domestic league appearances and goals as of 14 May 2026

Laro Gómez Rodríguez (born 16 October 2006) is a Spanish professional footballer who plays as a goalkeeper for Rayo Cantabria.

== Career ==
Gómez was born in Santander, Cantabria, and was a Racing de Santander youth graduate. On 5 July 2024, he was loaned to Segunda Federación side UM Mescobedo for one year.

Gómez made his senior debut on 8 September 2024, starting in a 1–0 away loss to CD Laredo. A first-choice during most of the season as the club suffered relegation, he returned to Racing in July 2025, being assigned to the reserves also in the fourth division.

A third-choice in the first team behind Jokin Ezkieta and Plamen Andreev, Gómez became a first-choice ahead of the match against Real Valladolid, as Ezkieta was out due to an injury and Andreev was due to be recalled by Feyenoord. He made his professional debut on 3 January 2026, starting in a 1–1 draw at the José Zorrilla Stadium.

== Personal life ==
Gómez's father Vichi was also a footballer and a goalkeeper. He too played for Escobedo, aside from representing SD Noja in Segunda División B.
