= Izan Yurrieta =

Spanish footballer (born 2003)

Personal information
- Full name: Izan Yurrieta Incera
- Date of birth: 7 January 2003 (age 23)
- Place of birth: Colindres, Spain
- Height: 1.72 m (5 ft 8 in)
- Position: Winger

Team information
- Current team: Ibiza
- Number: 28

Youth career
- 2013–2022: Racing Santander

Senior career*
Years	Team	Apps	(Gls)
2021–2026	Racing B	123	(10)
2025–2026	Racing Santander	1	(0)
2026–	Ibiza	16	(1)
- * Club domestic league appearances and goals as of 10 June 2026

Izan Yurrieta Incera (born 7 January 2003) is a Spanish professional footballer who plays as a winger for Primera Federación club Ibiza.

== Career ==
Born in Colindres, Cantabria, Yurrieta was a Racing de Santander youth graduate. He made his senior debut with the reserves on 5 September 2021, coming on as a half-time substitute in a 2–0 Segunda División RFEF home loss to Real Sociedad C.

Despite being a regular option with the B's, Yurrieta struggled with injuries in the following years, and only scored his first senior goal on 13 October 2024, netting the equalizer in a 2–1 home win over SD Compostela. He made his first team debut on 19 January of the following year, replacing Pablo Rodríguez late into a 6–0 Segunda División home routing of Racing de Ferrol.

On 15 January 2026, Yurrieta signed with Ibiza in Primera Federación for one-and-a-half years.
