= Jorge Delgado (footballer, born 2002) =

Spanish footballer

Personal information
- Full name: Jorge Delgado Caballero
- Date of birth: 9 November 2002 (age 24)
- Place of birth: Móstoles, Spain
- Height: 1.85 m (6 ft 1 in)
- Position: Forward

Team information
- Current team: Cultural Leonesa

Youth career
- 2009–2018: Móstoles
- 2018–2021: Getafe

Senior career*
Years	Team	Apps	(Gls)
2021–2022	Getafe B	22	(6)
2022	→ Racing B (loan)	17	(3)
2022–2024	Racing B	54	(15)
2022–2024	Racing Santander	1	(0)
2024–2025	Valladolid B	34	(15)
2025–2026	Valladolid	7	(1)
2026	→ Chaves (loan)	13	(2)
2026–	Cultural Leonesa	0	(0)
- * Club domestic league appearances and goals as of 20 June 2026

Jorge Delgado Caballero (born 9 November 2002) is a Spanish professional footballer who plays as a forward for Cultural y Deportiva Leonesa.

== Club career ==
Born in Móstoles, Community of Madrid, Delgado joined Getafe CF's youth setup in 2018, from hometown side CD Móstoles URJC. He made his senior debut with the reserves on 21 March 2021, starting in a 3–1 Segunda División B away loss against CD Atlético Baleares, and scored his first goal fourteen days later by netting the B's first in a 2–2 home draw against UD Melilla.

On 31 July 2021, Delgado was announced as an addition of Racing de Santander's reserve team in Segunda División RFEF, but the move never materialized and he returned to Getafe B instead. The following 10 January, however, he moved to Racing's B-side on loan until the end of the season.

On 9 August 2022, Delgado signed a permanent three-year contract with the Verdiblancos, and was again assigned to the B-team. He made his debut with the main squad on 15 October, coming on as a late substitute for Jorge Pombo in a 0–0 away draw against SD Huesca in the Segunda División.

On 20 August 2024, Delgado joined Real Valladolid on a one-year deal, being initially a member of the B-team also in the fourth division. The following 19 April, after scoring 13 goals for the side, he renewed his link until 2027 and was promoted to the main squad for the 2025–26 campaign.

On 20 January 2026, Delgado was sent on loan to Liga Portugal 2 club GD Chaves until the end of the 2025–26 season. Upon returning, he signed for Primera Federación side Cultural y Deportiva Leonesa on 18 August 2026.
