= Juan Gutiérrez (footballer, born 2000) =

Spanish footballer

Personal information
- Full name: Juan Gutiérrez Martínez
- Date of birth: 28 January 2000 (age 26)
- Place of birth: Comillas, Spain
- Height: 1.85 m (6 ft 1 in)
- Position: Centre-back

Team information
- Current team: Córdoba

Youth career
- Racing Santander

Senior career*
Years	Team	Apps	(Gls)
2017–2024	Racing Santander	7	(0)
2018–2022	Racing B	66	(2)
2020–2021	→ Ebro (loan)	22	(0)
2022–2023	→ Ceuta (loan)	23	(0)
2024–2026	Mirandés	76	(0)
2026–	Córdoba	0	(0)
- * Club domestic league appearances and goals as of 9 June 2026

Juan Gutiérrez Martínez (born 28 January 2000) is a Spanish professional footballer who plays as a central defender for Córdoba CF.

== Club career ==
Born in Comillas, Cantabria, Gutiérrez was a Racing de Santander youth graduate. On 30 August 2017, before even having appeared with the reserves, he made his first team debut by starting in a 2–1 away loss against SD Leioa, for the season's Copa del Rey.

Gutiérrez subsequently featured with the reserves in Tercera División before being loaned to Segunda División B side CD Ebro on 2 October 2020. Upon returning in July 2021, he renewed his contract until 2024.

On 11 August 2022, Gutiérrez moved to AD Ceuta FC in Primera Federación, on a season-long loan. Back to the Verdiblancos in July 2023, he was definitely assigned in the main squad in Segunda División, but remained unused in the first half of the campaign.

Gutiérrez made his professional debut on 16 March 2024, coming on as a second-half substitute for Juan Carlos Arana in a 1–1 away draw against Real Oviedo. On 5 July, he moved to fellow second division side CD Mirandés on a one-year contract.

On 18 March 2025, after establishing himself as a regular starter, Gutiérrez renewed his link with the Jabatos until 2026. On 1 July 2026, after suffering relegation, he moved to Córdoba CF on a two-year contract.
