= Pedro Felipe (footballer, born 2004) =

Brazilian footballer (born 2004)

Personal information
- Full name: Pedro Felipe de Jesus Gomes
- Date of birth: 23 May 2004 (age 22)
- Place of birth: Itajuípe, Brazil
- Height: 1.90 m (6 ft 3 in)
- Position: Centre-back

Team information
- Current team: Racing Santander
- Number: 22

Youth career
- –2022: Vitória
- 2022: → Palmeiras (loan)
- 2023–2024: Palmeiras

Senior career*
| Years | Team | Apps | (Gls) |
| 2024–2025 | Palmeiras | 0 | (0) |
| 2024–2025 | → Juventus Next Gen (loan) | 13 | (0) |
| 2025–2026 | Juventus Next Gen | 15 | (2) |
| 2025–2026 | Juventus | 0 | (0) |
| 2026 | → Sassuolo (loan) | 3 | (0) |
| 2026– | Racing Santander | 1 | (0) |
- * Club domestic league appearances and goals as of 16 August 2026

Pedro Felipe de Jesus Gomes (born 23 May 2004), known as Pedro Felipe, is Brazilian professional footballer who plays as a centre-back for La Liga club Racing Santander.

== Career ==
=== Early career ===
Pedro Felipe started playing in Brazilian club Palmeiras' youth set-up. With the Verdão, he won several youth trophies, such as the Copa São Paulo de Futebol Júnior (2023), the Copa do Brasil Sub-20 (2022) and the Campeonato Paulista U20 (2023).

=== Juventus ===
In January 2024, he joined Juventus on a loan till June of the same year. He was sent to play for their reserve team Juventus Next Gen in Serie C, with whom he made eight appearances in the remainder of the 2024–25 season. In June 2024, Juventus borrowed him again on a one-year loan for €300,000 with a buying option of €2,3 million. In late November 2024, Pedro Felipe ruptured his anterior cruciate ligament and was ruled out for the rest of the season.

In February 2025, Juventus announced that they had bought Pedro Felipe from Palmeiras for a €700,000. Pedro Felipe signed a four-and-a-half-year contract until 2029.

In the first half of the 2025–26 season, Pedro Felipe began to be included in the senior Juventus matchday squad, and appeared on the bench in most league games, but did not see any time on the field.

==== Loan to Sassuolo ====
On 2 February 2026, Pedro Felipe was loaned by Sassuolo, with an option to buy. On February 20, 2026, during Sassuolo-Verona, he made his Serie A debut, appearing on the pitch in the final minutes of the match.

=== Racing Santander ===
On 4 August 2026, Pedro Felipe signed a four-year contract with La Liga side Racing Santander.

== Style of play ==
Pedro Felipe is a physical 1.90m tall centre-back who is said to have a good technique.
