= Sergio Martínez (Spanish footballer) =

Spanish footballer (born 2007)

Personal information
- Full name: Sergio Martínez Montero
- Date of birth: 15 May 2007 (age 19)
- Place of birth: Laredo, Spain
- Height: 1.85 m (6 ft 1 in)
- Position: Defensive midfielder

Team information
- Current team: Real Madrid B
- Number: 16

Youth career
- Laredo
- 2017–2025: Racing Santander

Senior career*
Years	Team	Apps	(Gls)
2025–2026	Racing B	18	(0)
2025–2026	Racing Santander	12	(1)
2026–	Real Madrid B	12	(0)

International career
2025–	Spain U19	3	(0)
- * Club domestic league appearances and goals as of 22 November 2026

Sergio Martínez Montero (born 15 May 2007) is a Spanish professional footballer who plays as a defensive midfielder for Primera Federación club Real Madrid B.

== Club career ==
Born in Laredo, Cantabria, Martínez joined Racing de Santander's youth sides for the Alevín squad, from hometown side CD Laredo. In October 2024, while still a youth, he began training with the first team.

Martínez made his senior debut with the reserves on 6 April 2025, coming on as a late substitute for Pipi Nakai in a 2–1 Segunda Federación home win over CD Numancia. He signed a professional three-year contract in the summer, and featured with the main squad in the pre-season.

Martínez made his professional debut on 16 August 2025, replacing fellow youth graduate Íñigo Sainz-Maza in a 3–1 Segunda División home win over CD Castellón. On 14 November, he renewed his contract with the club until 2029, and featured in 13 matches overall during the season as they achieved promotion as champions.

Martínez made his La Liga debut on 16 August 2026, starting and scoring his team's second in a 2–2 home draw against Villarreal CF.

On 31 August 2026, Martínez signed for Real Madrid B after the club activated his €3 million release clause.

== Career statistics ==
=== Club ===
As of match played 20 November 2026

Club	Season	League			Cup		Other		Total	
Club	Season	Division	Apps	Goals	Apps	Goals	Apps	Goals	Apps	Goals
Racing B	2024–25	Segunda Federación	1	0	—		—		1	0
Racing B	2025–26	Segunda Federación	17	0	—		—		17	0
Racing B	Total		18	0	—		—		18	0
Racing Santander	2025–26	Segunda División	10	0	3	0	—		13	0
Racing Santander	2026–27	La Liga	2	1	—		—		2	1
Racing Santander	Total		12	1	3	0	—		15	1
Real Madrid Castilla	2026–27	Primera Federación	12	0	—		—		12	0
Career total			42	1	3	0	0	0	45	1

== Honours ==
Racing Santander

- Segunda División: 2025–26
