= Diego Campo =

Spanish footballer

Personal information
- Full name: Diego Campo González
- Date of birth: 16 November 2001 (age 24)
- Place of birth: Torrelavega, Spain
- Height: 1.76 m (5 ft 9 in)
- Position: Attacking midfielder

Team information
- Current team: Gimnástica Segoviana
- Number: 23

Youth career
- Colegio El Salvador
- Gimnástica de Torrelavega
- Bansander
- 2018–2020: Racing Santander

Senior career*
Years	Team	Apps	(Gls)
2020–2024	Racing B	119	(14)
2023–2024	Racing Santander	1	(0)
2024–2025	Gimnástica de Torrelavega	31	(2)
2025–	Gimnástica Segoviana	21	(0)
- * Club domestic league appearances and goals as of 7 May 2026

Diego Campo González (born 16 November 2001) is a Spanish footballer who plays as an attacking midfielder for Segunda Federación club Gimnástica Segoviana.

== Career ==
Born in Torrelavega, Cantabria, Campo joined Racing de Santander's youth setup in 2018, from Club Bansander. He made his senior debut with the former's reserves on 19 July 2020, coming on as a late substitute in a 1–1 away draw against Gimnástica de Torrelavega, for the Tercera División play-offs.

Campo scored his first senior goal on 24 October 2020, netting the B's opener in a 2–2 home draw against SD Textil Escudo. He made his first team debut on 16 December 2023, replacing Iván Morante late into a 3–3 Segunda División away draw against CD Eldense.
