= Diego Fuentes (footballer) =

Spanish footballer (born 2004)

Personal information
- Full name: Diego Fuentes Pérez
- Date of birth: 1 September 2003 (age 23)
- Place of birth: Medio Cudeyo, Spain
- Height: 1.76 m (5 ft 9 in)
- Position: Winger

Team information
- Current team: Jaén

Youth career
- 2015–2022: Racing Santander

Senior career*
Years	Team	Apps	(Gls)
2022–2026	Racing B	63	(7)
2022–2023	→ Cayón (loan)	27	(10)
2025–2026	Racing Santander	5	(0)
2026–	Jaén	0	(0)
- * Club domestic league appearances and goals as of 14 May 2026

Diego Fuentes Pérez (born 1 September 2003), sometimes known as Chino, is a Spanish professional footballer who plays as a winger for Real Jaén.

== Career ==
Born in Medio Cudeyo, Cantabria, Fuentes was a Racing de Santander youth graduate. In 2022, after finishing his formation, he was loaned to Tercera Federación side CD Cayón, for one year.

In May 2023, after scoring ten goals as Cayón achieved promotion to Segunda Federación as champions, Fuentes returned to his parent club, He struggled to establish himself as a starter, and had a shoulder injury in February 2024 which cut short the remainder of his season.

Fuentes made his first team debut on 28 October 2025, coming on as a second-half substitute for Íñigo Sainz-Maza and providing an assist to Yeray Cabanzón's third in a 4–0 away routing of SD Logroñés, for the campaign's Copa del Rey. He made his professional debut the following 3 January, replacing Iñigo Vicente late into a 1–1 Segunda División away draw against Real Valladolid.

On 15 June 2026, Fuentes joined Real Jaén in the fourth division.
