= Aguadulce, Seville =

Coordinates: 37°15′08″N 04°59′33″W

Aguadulce
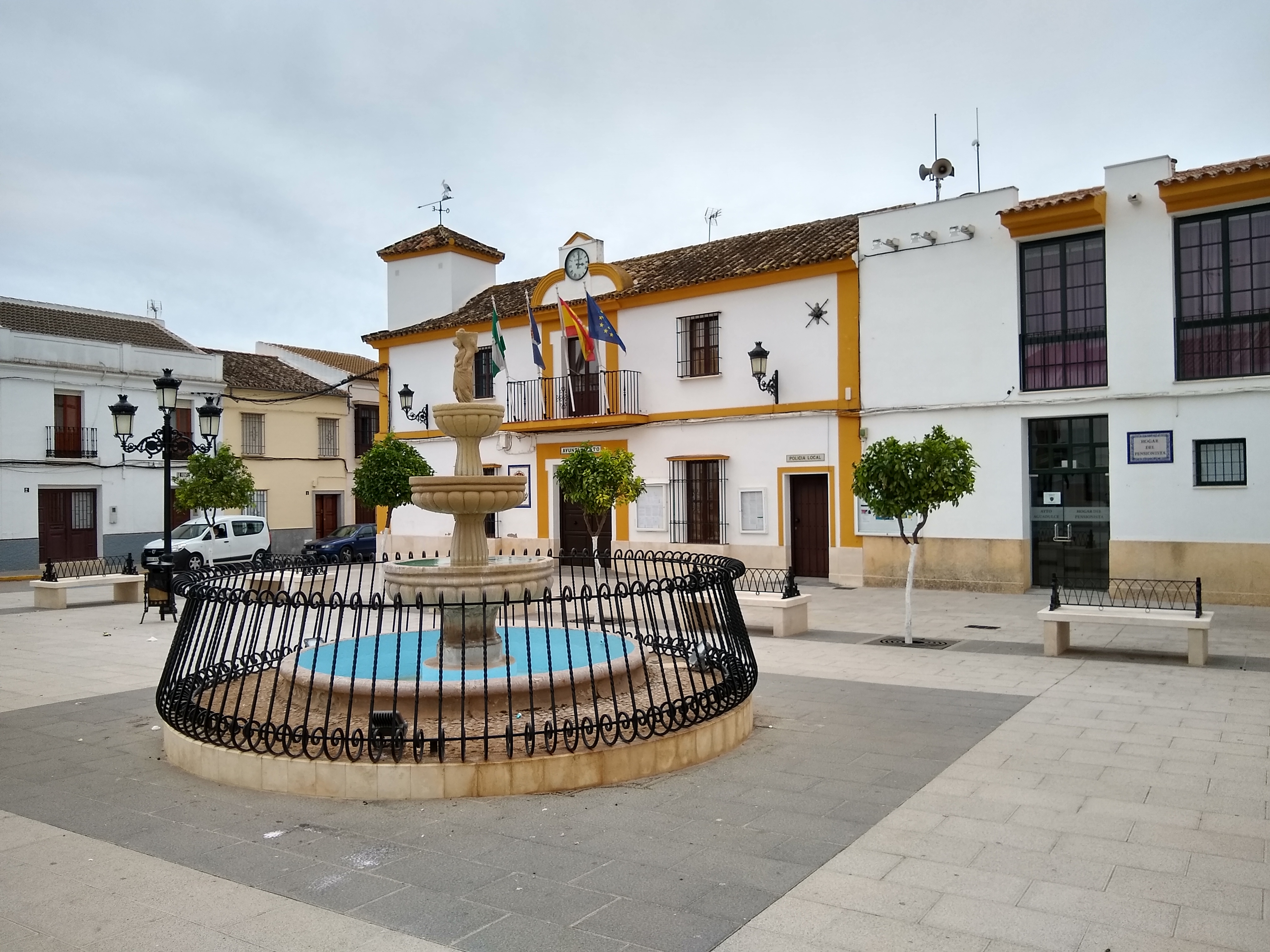
- Plaza Ramón y Cajal

- Flag Coat of arms

- Location in Spain.
- Country: Spain
- Autonomous community: Andalusia

Government
  - Mayor: Estrella Montaño García (PSOE)

Area
  - Total: 13.69 km^{2} (5.29 sq mi)
- Elevation: 264 m (866 ft)

Population (2025-01-01)
  - Total: 2,109
  - Density: 154.1/km^{2} (399.0/sq mi)
- Time zone: UTC+1 (CET)
  - Summer (DST): UTC+2 (CEST)
- Website: Official website

Aguadulce is a municipality in Seville. In 2005, it had a population of 1,993. It has an area of 13.98 square kilometers and has a population density of 142.4 people per square kilometer. Aguadulce is at an elevation of 264 meters and is situated 99 kilometers from Seville.

== Demographics ==
It has a population of 2109 inhabitants (INE 2025).

== History ==
Three hundred meters above sea level at the northeast border of Aguadulce, there were several Bronze Age peoples settled. Bronze in the Iberian Peninsula started about 2000 BCE.

These first settlers lived atop hills, which aided in defense against enemies. This was an ideal location for these primitive peoples. They were able to create simple bronze objects, some of which can still be found in the hills. However, excavation is needed to recover the artifacts.

During the period of Roman rule, Andalusia was known as Bética, which was created by Augustus in 27 BCE.

== Gilena socialist uprising ==
In 1931 the nearby town of Gilena had over four thousand inhabitants and almost all of them worked in the agriculture. The work conditions were very hard; therefore the life standards were very difficult. The workers didn't earn much money; they were unemployed most of the days. The poverty and even the famine were present in most of the Gilena families.

On 12 April 1931 the local elections were celebrated in Spain. It was the first time for nearly sixty years that a free election had been allowed in Spain. The republican parties and left-wing parties won the elections in the cities. The Alfonso XIII's, monarchy and Primo de Rivera's dictatorship –before- were both a failure. Spanish people wanted a change in the government which could sort out their problems. On 14 April the Second Spanish Republic was announced; most Spaniards thought that their life would improve.

The historians have always said that the change was required in the cities; the rural areas didn't have freedom to choose their representatives because the "caciques" (or local political bosses) controlled the whole system. For example, in Gilena there wasn't any election; the law of 1907 allowed that the election wasn't needed if the number the vacancies were equal to the number of candidates. But the news told us that in Gilena, before the election, the socialists already were well organized; however, the system didn't allow them to take part in the aforementioned election. On the other hand, on 14 April all of them went out to the streets to demonstrate their support to the Republic.

During the Republic, in Spain, there were a lot of parties, however in Gilena there were only two: PSOE, the left-wing party, and IR, the centre party. Actually, this party, IR, was led by a landowner, a farmer "cacique". The workers could choose either of them, but if you chose the Socialist Party, you didn't work. The two parties had union headquarters in the same street. This location caused many tensions.

On 9 October a committee, composed by public authorities, went to Seville to ask the civil governor for help. The same day, the socialist workers summoned a general strike to push in the meeting. In the dawn, the pickets went out to the fields to verify that anybody was working.

The most complicated situation was given in the farmhouse called "Marqués", the most important finca in the whole area, only 3 kilometres away from Gilena; its lands are included between Gilena and Aguadulce. Some pickets tried to convince the workers that they gave up their works, but they didn't stop and they began to insult each other.

The pickets returned to the union headquarters to ask for help. Meanwhile, from the farmhouse Marqués, they called the Aguadulce civil guards. When a hundred of workers returned, they found the civil guards aimed their guns at them. They were registered and led back to Gilena, to the civil guard's barracks. In the search, they didn't find firearms. On the contrary, sticks, stones and other objects were found.

The civil guard corporal, who didn't know Gilena, led the prisoners' row to the town centre, which was a mistake. Along the way, others civil guards, who were patrolling the streets, joined up to a total of 10. When they came to the village, many people were gathering. The tension was growing.

When the prisoners' chains passed in front of the socialist headquarters, the shouts grew. Then, several workers surrounded the corporal, took his gun off and put it into their headquarters.

At that moment, when the other civil guards saw the corporal fallen on the floor, they began to shoot. Everybody run and hid everywhere. Many people hid away in the union headquarters; inside, some of them climbed up the courtyards wall to the next houses. Some hours later, the reinforcements of civil guards came from Osuna and Estepa.

The corporal Pablo Garcia Albano and five workers died, one of them in the hospital in Seville. Many people were injured, sixty were arrested and many people remained inside their houses. The politics and military authorities visited the village; the journalists wrote about the events in their newspapers. For most of the papers, the victim was the corporal.

Years later, the judgment was celebrated. The murderer wasn't identified and only three workers were found guilty by insults to the authorities. The legend told that a worker stuck a needle in the corporal's stomach, but the reality was that his head was shattered and the gun, stolen by the workers, wasn't ever shot.

== Geography ==
Aguadulce is a small locality situated in the central part of Andalusia, and it is located near Algamitas, Badalatosa, Casariche, Coripe, El Coronil, El Saucejo, Gilena, Herrera, La Roda de Andalucía, Lora de Estepa, Los Corrales, Marinaleda, Martín de la Jara, Montellano, Morón de la Frontera, Pedrera, Pruna, and Villanueva de San Juan.

The 13.98 square kilometer area of the municipality is bordered by Osuna on the west where the Río Blanco divides the two. To the east, the towns Gilena and Estepa border Aguadulce.

New infrastructure in the area (including A92) are all part of Expo '92 and gave the town much tourism in just a few days.

Aguadulce is 99 kilometers from Seville, about 107 kilometers from Málaga, about 122 kilometers from Córdoba, and about 143 kilometers from Granada.

== See also ==
- List of municipalities in Seville
