= Javier Castro (footballer, born 2000) =

Spanish footballer

Personal information
- Full name: Javier Castro Urdín
- Date of birth: 13 September 2000 (age 26)
- Place of birth: Madrid, Spain
- Height: 1.83 m (6 ft 0 in)
- Positions: Centre-back; right-back

Team information
- Current team: Cádiz

Youth career
- 2013–2015: Canillas
- 2015–2019: Rayo Vallecano

Senior career*
Years	Team	Apps	(Gls)
2019–2020	Alcorcón B	25	(0)
2020–2024	Alcorcón	94	(1)
2021–2022	→ Celta B (loan)	35	(1)
2024–2026	Racing Santander	69	(5)
2026–	Cádiz	0	(0)
- * Club domestic league appearances and goals as of 10 May 2026

Javier Castro Urdín (born 13 September 2000) is a Spanish professional footballer who plays as either a central defender or a right-back for Cádiz CF.

== Career ==
Born in Madrid, Castro joined Rayo Vallecano's youth setup in 2015, from CD Canillas. On 25 July 2019, after finishing his formation, he signed for AD Alcorcón and was immediately assigned to the reserves in the Tercera División.

Castro made his senior debut on 25 August 2019, starting in a 1–0 Tercera División away win against Fútbol Alcobendas Sport. His first team debut came the following 26 January, after coming on as a late substitute for injured Paris Adot in a 3–1 home win against SD Ponferradina in the Segunda División.

On 23 June 2021, Castro renewed his contract with Alkor until 2025. On 27 July, he was loaned to Primera División RFEF side Celta de Vigo B, for one year.

Upon returning, Castro became a regular starter as Alkor achieved promotion to the second division, and scored his first professional goal on 5 November 2023, in a 3–1 home win over Racing de Santander. The following 10 July, after suffering immediate relegation, he moved to the Verdiblancos on a two-year deal.

On 6 July 2026, after helping Racing in their promotion to La Liga, Castro signed a three-year contract with Cádiz CF in division two.

== Honours ==
Racing Santander

- Segunda División: 2025–26
