= Marcos Bustillo =

Spanish footballer

Personal information
- Full name: Marcos Bustillo Aquesolo
- Date of birth: 12 January 2001 (age 25)
- Place of birth: Bilbao, Spain
- Height: 1.84 m (6 ft 0 in)
- Position: Midfielder

Team information
- Current team: Eldense
- Number: 8

Youth career
- Parayas
- Bezana
- 2014–2018: Racing Santander
- 2018–2020: Bansander

Senior career*
Years	Team	Apps	(Gls)
2020–2021	Tropezón	19	(4)
2021–2024	Racing B	57	(10)
2021	Racing Santander	2	(0)
2022–2023	→ La Nucía (loan)	24	(2)
2024–2025	Sestao River	36	(3)
2025–	Eldense	33	(4)
- * Club domestic league appearances and goals as of 17 August 2026

Marcos Bustillo Aquesolo (born 12 January 2001) is a Spanish footballer who plays as a midfielder for CD Eldense.

== Career ==
Born in Bilbao, Biscay, Basque Country, Bustillo moved to Cantabria at early age and began his career with CD Parayas. After subsequently playing for CD Bezana, he spent three seasons with Racing de Santander's youth sides before leaving for Club Bansander in January 2018.

In 2020, after finishing his formation, Bustillo signed for Tercera División side CD Tropezón and made his senior debut with the club. He returned to Racing in June 2021, being initially a member of the reserves in Segunda División RFEF.

After impressing with the pre-season, Bustillo first appeared with the main squad on 29 August 2021, coming on as a late substitute for Patrick Soko in a 1–0 Primera Federación home win over CD Tudelano. The following 8 July, after another first team appearance, he was loaned to CF La Nucía in the third division, for one year.

Back to Racing in July 2023, Bustillo returned to the B-team in the fourth tier and was promoted to the main squad the following June. However, after being deemed surplus to requirements by manager José Alberto, he moved to Sestao River Club on 3 July 2024.

On 2 July 2025, Bustillo signed a one-year contract with CD Eldense also in the third division. The following 19 June, after contributing with five goals in 35 matches overall during the campaign as the club achieved promotion to Segunda División, he agreed to a one-year extension.

Bustillo made his professional debut on 17 August 2026, starting in a 3–0 away loss to UD Almería.
