= Jokin Ezkieta =

Spanish footballer (born 1996)

Personal information
- Full name: Jokin Ezkieta Mendiburu
- Date of birth: 17 August 1996 (age 30)
- Place of birth: Pamplona, Spain
- Height: 1.93 m (6 ft 4 in)
- Position: Goalkeeper

Team information
- Current team: Cádiz (on loan from Racing Santander)
- Number: 13

Youth career
- Osasuna

Senior career*
Years	Team	Apps	(Gls)
2014–2015	Osasuna B	15	(0)
2015–2019	Barcelona B	15	(0)
2016–2017	→ Sabadell (loan)	37	(0)
2019–2020	Athletic Bilbao B	25	(0)
2020–2022	Athletic Bilbao	1	(0)
2022–	Racing Santander	123	(0)
2026–	→ Cádiz (loan)	0	(0)

International career
2014–2015	Spain U19	2	(0)
- * Club domestic league appearances and goals as of 31 May 2026

Jokin Ezkieta Mendiburu (born 17 August 1996) is a Spanish professional footballer who plays as a goalkeeper for Cádiz CF, on loan from Racing de Santander.

== Club career ==
Born in Pamplona, Navarre, Ezkieta represented CA Osasuna as a youth. He made his senior debut with the reserves on 24 August 2014, starting in a 2–0 away win against CD Corellano in the Tercera División.

In March 2015, as his contract was due to expire, Ezkieta agreed to a contract with FC Barcelona. The deal was made official on 17 July, with the player signing a four-year deal and being assigned to the B-side in the Segunda División B.

On 22 July 2016, Ezkieta was loaned to fellow third division side CE Sabadell FC, for one year. An undisputed starter, he contributed with 37 appearances (3,330 minutes of action) as his side narrowly avoided relegation.

Ezkieta subsequently returned to Barça and its reserve team, at the time in the Segunda División. He made his professional debut on 25 September 2017, starting in a 2–1 home loss against CD Lugo. His sole call-up to the first team in La Liga was for the 1–0 win at Real Valladolid the following 23 August, taking Jasper Cillessen's place on the bench due to the Dutchman's rib injury.

On 1 July 2019, free agent Ezkieta signed a four-year contract with Athletic Bilbao, with a release clause set at €45 million. He made his first-team debut on 28 January of the following year, replacing Unai Núñez in the second minute of a 3–3 Copa del Rey last-16 away draw against CD Tenerife, as Iago Herrerín was sent off; the game went to penalties and he saved from Joselu in a 4–2 win.

Ezkieta made his league debut on the final day of the 2020–21 season in a 2–0 away loss to Elche CF. On 4 July 2022, after spending the previous campaign as a third-choice behind Unai Simón and Julen Agirrezabala, he terminated his contract.

On 5 July 2022, Ezkieta signed a two-year deal with Racing de Santander in the second division. Initially a backup to Miquel Parera, he became a first-choice in the 2023–24 campaign, and signed a three-year extension until 2027 on 14 March 2024.

Ezkieta remained a starter for the Verdiblancos in the following years, helping in their promotion to the top tier in 2026, as champions. On 5 July of that year, however, he was loaned to Cádiz CF in division two, for one year.

== Career statistics ==
As of match played 31 May 2026

Appearances and goals by club, season and competition
Club	Season	League			Copa del Rey		Continental		Other		Total	
Club	Season	Division	Apps	Goals	Apps	Goals	Apps	Goals	Apps	Goals	Apps	Goals
Osasuna B	2014–15	Segunda División B	15	0	—		—		—		15	0
Barcelona B	2015–16	Segunda División B	3	0	—		—		—		3	0
Barcelona B	2017–18	Segunda División	2	0	—		—		—		2	0
Barcelona B	2018–19	Segunda División B	10	0	—		—		—		10	0
Barcelona B	Total		15	0	—		—		—		15	0
Sabadell (loan)	2016–17	Segunda División B	37	0	—		—		—		37	0
Athletic Bilbao B	2019–20	Segunda División B	25	0	—		—		1 (Note: Appearance(s) in promotion play-offs)	0	26	0
Athletic Bilbao	2019–20	La Liga	0	0	1	0	—		—		1	0
Athletic Bilbao	2020–21	La Liga	1	0	2	0	—		—		3	0
Athletic Bilbao	2021–22	La Liga	0	0	0	0	—		—		0	0
Athletic Bilbao	Total		1	0	3	0	—		—		4	0
Racing Santander	2022–23	Segunda División	6	0	1	0	—		—		7	0
Racing Santander	2023–24	Segunda División	42	0	0	0	—		—		42	0
Racing Santander	2024–25	Segunda División	42	0	0	0	—		2	0	44	0
Racing Santander	2025–26	Segunda División	33	0	1	0	—		—		34	0
Racing Santander	Total		123	0	2	0	—		2	0	127	0
Career total			216	0	5	0	0	0	3	0	224	0

== Honours ==
Athletic Bilbao

- Supercopa de España: 2021
- Copa del Rey: Runner-up 2019–20, 2020–21

Racing Santander

- Segunda División: 2025–26
