= Mario García (footballer, born 2003) =

Spanish footballer

Personal information
- Full name: Mario García Alvear
- Date of birth: 2 October 2003 (age 23)
- Place of birth: Peñacastillo, Spain
- Height: 1.72 m (5 ft 8 in)
- Position: Left-back

Team information
- Current team: Widzew Łódź
- Number: 40

Youth career
- Bansander
- 2014–2022: Atlético Perines

Senior career*
Years	Team	Apps	(Gls)
2022–2024	Racing B	31	(1)
2023–2026	Racing Santander	77	(4)
2026–	Widzew Łódź	8	(2)
- * Club domestic league appearances and goals as of 14:32, 20 September 2026 (UTC)

Mario García Alvear (born 2 October 2003) is a Spanish professional footballer who plays as a left-back for Ekstraklasa club Widzew Łódź.

== Career ==
Born in Peñacastillo, Cantabria, García represented Club Bansander and CA Perines as a youth. In July 2022, after finishing his formation, he moved to Racing de Santander and was assigned to the reserves in Segunda Federación.

García made his senior debut on 4 September 2022, starting and scoring Rayo Cantabria's second in a 2–1 away win over Ourense CF. He made his first team debut the following 5 February, coming on as a half-time substitute for Álvaro Mantilla in a 1–1 Segunda División away draw against SD Ponferradina.

García scored his first professional goal on 28 May 2023, netting the opener in a 3–1 home win over FC Cartagena. He was regularly used in the main squad in the following years, helping in their promotion to La Liga in 2026.

On 10 July 2026, García moved to Polish club Widzew Łódź on a contract until 2029, with an option for another year.

== Honours ==
Racing Santander

- Segunda División: 2025–26
