= Simon Eriksson =

Swedish footballer (born 2006)

Personal information
- Full name: Simon Olof Eriksson
- Date of birth: 24 April 2006 (age 20)
- Place of birth: Uppsala, Sweden
- Height: 1.95 m (6 ft 5 in)
- Position: Goalkeeper

Team information
- Current team: Racing Santander
- Number: 1

Youth career
- Sunnersta
- Upsala
- 2019–2022: Dalkurd

Senior career*
Years	Team	Apps	(Gls)
2023	Dalkurd	1	(0)
2024	FC Stockholm	10	(0)
2024–2025	Elfsborg	20	(0)
2024	→ FC Stockholm (loan)	12	(0)
2026–	Racing Santander	6	(0)
- * Club domestic league appearances and goals as of 16 May 2026

Simon Olof Eriksson (born 24 April 2006) is a Swedish professional footballer who plays as a goalkeeper for Spanish club Racing de Santander.

== Club career ==
=== Early career ===
After playing for the youth sides of Sunnersta AIF and Upsala IF, Eriksson moved to Dalkurd FF in 2019. Promoted to the first team of the latter in 2023, he made his senior debut on 4 March of that year, coming on as a second-half substitute in a 5–2 home win over Oskarshamns AIK in the Svenska Cupen. He also featured in a league match in September, becoming the youngest goalkeeper of the division to do so.

On 14 February 2024, FC Stockholm announced the signing of Eriksson until 2026. Initially a backup option, he became a starter in the ninth round in the place of Gustav Nyberg.

=== Elfsborg ===
On 21 August 2024, Allsvenskan side IF Elfsborg announced the signing of Eriksson on a contract until 2028; he remained on loan at FC Stockholm until the end of the year. Upon arriving in the 2025 season, he was initially a third-choice behind Isak Pettersson and Lucas Hägg-Johansson, and made his club debut on 5 May of that year, in a 2–0 home win over GAIS.

Eriksson subsequently enjoyed a run in the starting lineup for most of the campaign, only losing the spot to Pettersson in the last five matches of the year.

=== Racing Santander ===
On 19 January 2026, Eriksson moved abroad for the first time in his career, joining Spanish side Racing de Santander of the Segunda División on a four-and-a-half-year deal.

== International career ==
On 1 October 2025, Eriksson was called up to the Sweden national under-21 team.

== Career statistics ==
As of match played 16 May 2026

Appearances and goals by club, season and competition
Club	Season	League			National Cup		Europe		Other		Total	
Club	Season	Division	Apps	Goals	Apps	Goals	Apps	Goals	Apps	Goals	Apps	Goals
Dalkurd FF	2023	Ettan	1	0	0	0	—		—		1	0
FC Stockholm	2024	Ettan	10	0	2	0	—		—		12	0
Elfsborg	2025	Allsvenskan	20	0	1	0	0	0	—		21	0
FC Stockholm (loan)	2024	Ettan	12	0	—		—		2	0	14	0
Racing Santander	2025–26	Segunda División	6	0	—		—		—		6	0
Racing Santander	2026–27	La Liga	0	0	0	0	—		—		0	0
Racing Santander	Total		6	0	0	0	—		—		6	0
Career total			49	0	3	0	0	0	2	0	54	0

== Honours ==
Racing Santander

- Segunda División: 2025–26
