= Jon Karrikaburu =

Spanish footballer (born 2002)

Personal information
- Full name: Jon Karrikaburu Jaimerena
- Date of birth: 19 September 2002 (age 24)
- Place of birth: Elizondo, Spain
- Height: 1.83 m (6 ft 0 in)
- Position: Forward

Team information
- Current team: Burgos

Youth career
- 2014–2019: Real Sociedad

Senior career*
Years	Team	Apps	(Gls)
2019–2021	Real Sociedad C	38	(32)
2021–2022	Real Sociedad B	45	(15)
2021–2026	Real Sociedad	13	(0)
2023	→ Leganés (loan)	19	(3)
2023–2024	→ Alavés (loan)	2	(0)
2024	→ Andorra (loan)	21	(3)
2024–2025	→ Racing Santander (loan)	41	(8)
2026–	Burgos	0	(0)

International career^{‡}
2021–2022	Spain U21	2	(0)
- * Club domestic league appearances and goals as of 22 April 2026 ‡ National team caps and goals as of 25 March 2022

Jon Karrikaburu Jaimerena (born 19 September 2002) is a Spanish professional footballer who plays as a forward for Burgos CF.

== Club career ==
Born in Elizondo, Navarre, Karrikaburu joined Real Sociedad's youth setup in 2014, aged 12. He made his senior debut with the C-team at the age of just 17 on 14 September 2019, starting and scoring his team's only in a 2–1 Tercera División away loss against Pasaia.

Karrikaburu scored ten goals for the C's during his first senior season, and netted an impressive rate of 22 goals in only 20 matches for the side in his second; highlights included two hat-tricks against Aurrerá Ondarroa (4–1 home win) and Balmaseda (4–2 away win) and four goals in a 6–1 thrashing of Deusto. On his debut for the reserves on 28 March 2021, he also scored the side's third in a 4–1 win over Alavés B in the Segunda División B.

On 3 May 2021, Karrikaburu renewed his contract until 2026. He made an instant impact for the B-side after his debut, contributing with four goals in nine appearances as his side returned to the Segunda División after a 59-year absence; one of his goals was an extra time winner in a 2–1 defeat of Algeciras, which sealed Sanse's promotion.

Karrikaburu made his professional debut on 14 August 2021, starting and scoring the winner in a 1–0 home win over Leganés. He made his first team debut on 30 September, replacing fellow youth graduate Mikel Oyarzabal in a 1–1 home draw against Monaco, for the season's UEFA Europa League.

On 15 January 2023, Karrikaburu was loaned to second division side Leganés for the remainder of the season. On 1 September, he moved to Alavés in the top tier also in a temporary deal.

On 6 January 2024, after being rarely used, Karrikaburu's loan with Alavés was terminated, and he moved to FC Andorra in the second division on loan for the remainder of the season the following day. On 20 July, he agreed to a one-year loan to fellow league team Racing de Santander.

Upon returning to Real Sociedad in July 2025, Karrikaburu was assigned to the first team, but featured rarely. He then signed a two-year deal with Burgos CF on 28 August 2026.

== Career statistics ==
=== Club ===
As of match played 22 April 2026

Appearances and goals by club, season and competition
Club	Season	League			Copa del Rey		Europe		Other		Total	
Club	Season	Division	Apps	Goals	Apps	Goals	Apps	Goals	Apps	Goals	Apps	Goals
Real Sociedad C	2019–20	Tercera División	18	10	—		—		—		18	10
Real Sociedad C	2020–21	Tercera División	20	22	—		—		—		20	22
Real Sociedad C	Total		38	32	—		—		—		38	32
Real Sociedad B	2020–21	Segunda División B	9	4	—		—		—		9	4
Real Sociedad B	2021–22	Segunda División	36	11	—		—		—		36	11
Real Sociedad B	Total		45	15	—		—		—		45	15
Real Sociedad	2021–22	La Liga	0	0	0	0	1 (Note: Appearance(s) in UEFA Europa League)	0	—		1	0
Real Sociedad	2022–23	La Liga	6	0	2	2	4	0	—		12	2
Real Sociedad	2024–25	La Liga	0	0	0	0	0	0	—		0	0
Real Sociedad	2025–26	La Liga	7	0	1	0	—		—		8	0
Real Sociedad	Total		13	0	3	2	5	0	—		21	2
Leganés (loan)	2022–23	Segunda División	19	3	—		—		—		31	3
Alavés (loan)	2023–24	La Liga	2	0	2	3	—		—		4	3
Andorra (loan)	2023–24	Segunda División	21	3	—		—		1 (Note: Appearance(s) in Copa Catalunya)	0	22	3
Racing Santander	2024–25	Segunda División	41	8	2	1	—		2 (Note: Appearance(s) in La Liga play-offs)	0	45	9
Career total			179	61	7	6	5	0	3	0	194	67
