= Miquel Parera =

Spanish footballer

Personal information
- Full name: Miquel Parera Pizà
- Date of birth: 18 May 1996 (age 30)
- Place of birth: Manacor, Spain
- Height: 1.82 m (6 ft 0 in)
- Position: Goalkeeper

Team information
- Current team: Racing Ferrol
- Number: 1

Youth career
- Manacor
- 2007–2015: Valencia

Senior career*
Years	Team	Apps	(Gls)
2014–2017	Mallorca B	30	(0)
2017–2021	Mallorca	13	(0)
2021–2025	Racing Santander	68	(0)
2025–	Racing Ferrol	32	(0)
- * Club domestic league appearances and goals as of 9 June 2026

Miquel Parera Pizà (Balearic Catalan: [miˈcɛl pəˈɾeɾə piˈza]; born 18 May 1996) is a Spanish professional footballer who plays for Primera Federación club Racing Ferrol as a goalkeeper.

== Club career ==
Parera was born in Manacor, Mallorca, Balearic Islands, and joined RCD Mallorca's youth setup in 2007, from CE Manacor. He made his senior debut with the reserves on 31 August 2014, starting in a 1–2 Segunda División B away loss against CD Alcoyano.

Parera would feature sparingly for the B-side in the following campaigns, and renewed his contract on 3 April 2017. He was promoted to the main squad ahead of the 2017–18 campaign in the third division, and acted as a backup to Manolo Reina as his side returned to Segunda División at first attempt.

Parera made his professional debut on 11 September 2018, starting in a 1–0 home win against Real Oviedo for the season's Copa del Rey. On 25 October, he renewed his contract until 2021.

Parera made his debut in the second division on 4 November 2018, playing the full 90 minutes in a 1–1 draw at Real Oviedo. Still a backup to Reina, he featured in seven matches during the season as the club achieved a second consecutive promotion.

Parera made his La Liga debut on 19 July 2020, starting in a 2–2 away draw against CA Osasuna as his side was already relegated. On 15 June 2021, Parera moved to third division side Racing Santander on a one-year deal.

== Career statistics ==
=== Club ===
As of match played 11 April 2026

Appearances and goals by club, season and competition
Club	Season	League			National Cup		Other		Total	
Club	Season	Division	Apps	Goals	Apps	Goals	Apps	Goals	Apps	Goals
Mallorca B	2014–15	Segunda División B	3	0	—		—		3	0
Mallorca B	2015–16	Tercera División	9	0	—		—		9	0
Mallorca B	2016–17	Segunda División B	18	0	—		—		18	0
Mallorca B	Total		30	0	—		—		30	0
Mallorca	2017–18	Segunda División B	3	0	1	0	2 (Note: Appearance(s) in Promotion Playoffs)	0	5	0
Mallorca	2018–19	Segunda División	7	0	2	0	0	0	9	0
Mallorca	2019–20	La Liga	1	0	0	0	—		1	0
Mallorca	2020–21	Segunda División	2	0	2	0	—		4	0
Mallorca	Total		13	0	5	0	2	0	20	0
Racing Santander	2021–22	Primera División RFEF	30	0	3	0	1	0	34	0
Racing Santander	2022–23	Segunda División	37	0	0	0	—		37	0
Racing Santander	2023–24	Segunda División	0	0	1	0	—		1	0
Racing Santander	2024–25	Segunda División	0	0	3	0	—		3	0
Racing Santander	Total		67	0	7	0	1	0	75	0
Racing Ferrol	2025–26	Primera Federación	32	0	0	0	—		32	0
Career total			142	0	12	0	3	0	157	0
