= Maguette Gueye =

Senegalese footballer (born 2002)

Personal information
- Date of birth: 30 December 2002 (age 23)
- Place of birth: Sakal, Senegal
- Height: 1.88 m (6 ft 2 in)
- Position: Midfielder

Team information
- Current team: Racing Santander
- Number: 14

Senior career*
Years	Team	Apps	(Gls)
2021–2024	Partizani	66	(8)
2024–	Racing Santander	60	(2)
- * Club domestic league appearances and goals as of 16 August 2026

Maguette Gueye (born 30 December 2002) is a Senegalese professional footballer who plays as a midfielder for Spanish club Racing de Santander.

== Career ==
=== Partizani ===
Born in Sakal, Louga Department, Gueye joined Albanian side FK Partizani Tirana on 5 September 2021, signing a four-year contract with the club. He made his senior debut five days later, coming on as a late substitute in a 1–0 away loss to KF Teuta.

Gueye scored his first senior goal on 21 May 2022, netting his team's fourth in a 4–0 home routing of KF Kastrioti Krujë. He subsequently established himself as a regular starter for the club, being linked to FCSB, Villarreal CF and Hellas Verona FC in 2024.

=== Racing Santander ===
On 22 August 2024, Segunda División side Racing de Santander announced the signing of Gueye on a five-year contract, for a rumoured fee of around €1 million.

== Honours ==
Partizani

- Kategoria Superiore: 2022–23
- Albanian Supercup: 2023

Racing Santander

- Segunda División: 2025–26
