= Iñigo Vicente =

Spanish footballer (born 1998)

Personal information
- Full name: Iñigo Vicente Elorduy
- Date of birth: 6 January 1998 (age 28)
- Place of birth: Derio, Spain
- Height: 1.78 m (5 ft 10 in)
- Position: Winger

Team information
- Current team: Racing Santander
- Number: 10

Youth career
- 2008–2012: Athletic Bilbao
- 2012–2013: Danok Bat
- 2013–2016: Athletic Bilbao

Senior career*
Years	Team	Apps	(Gls)
2016–2017	Basconia	31	(14)
2017–2019	Bilbao Athletic	66	(20)
2019–2022	Athletic Bilbao	3	(0)
2019–2020	→ Mirandés (loan)	32	(3)
2021–2022	→ Mirandés (loan)	36	(6)
2022–	Racing Santander	162	(22)

International career
2019–2021	Spain U23	1	(0)
2019–	Basque Country	1	(0)
- * Club domestic league appearances and goals as of 16 August 2026

Iñigo Vicente Elorduy (born 6 January 1998) is a Spanish professional footballer who plays as a left winger for LaLiga club Racing de Santander.

== Club career ==
Born in Derio, Biscay, Basque Country, Vicente started his career at Athletic Bilbao's Lezama academy in 2008. He left the club in 2012 and joined Danok Bat CF, but returned in June of the following year.

Vicente made his senior debut with the farm team in the 2015–16 season, in Tercera División, before being promoted to the reserves in July 2017. On 21 December 2018, he signed a contract extension with the Lions until 2023.

On 6 August 2019, Vicente was loaned to Segunda División newcomers CD Mirandés, for one year. He made his professional debut on 17 August, starting in a 2–2 away draw against Rayo Vallecano.

Vicente scored his first professional goal on 9 November 2019, netting the opener in a 2–0 home defeat of Extremadura UD. He returned to Athletic in July 2020, after scoring three goals in 34 appearances, and was assigned to the main squad.

Vicente made first team – and La Liga – debut for the Lions on 1 October 2020, appearing as a second half substitute in a 1–0 home defeat to Cádiz CF. The following 1 July, he returned to Mirandés again on a one-year loan deal, this time along with Imanol García de Albéniz.

On 14 July 2022, Vicente moved to Racing de Santander, newly-promoted to the second division, on a three-year deal.

== International career ==
Vicente made his debut for the unofficial Basque Country national team in May 2019, in a 0–0 draw away to Panama for which a small, youthful and inexperienced squad was selected.

== Career statistics ==
=== Club ===
As of match played 31 May 2026

Appearances and goals by club, season and competition
Club	Season	League			National Cup		Other		Total	
Club	Season	Division	Apps	Goals	Apps	Goals	Apps	Goals	Apps	Goals
Bilbao Athletic	2016–17	Segunda División B	2	0	—		—		2	0
Bilbao Athletic	2017–18	Segunda División B	30	10	—		2 (Note: Appearance(s) in Promotion Playoffs)	0	32	10
Bilbao Athletic	2018–19	Segunda División B	34	10	—		—		34	10
Bilbao Athletic	Total		66	20	—		2	0	68	20
Athletic Bilbao	2018–19	La Liga	0	0	0	0	—		0	0
Athletic Bilbao	2020–21	La Liga	3	0	0	0	—		3	0
Athletic Bilbao	Total		3	0	0	0	—		3	0
Mirandés (loan)	2019–20	Segunda División	32	3	4	2	—		36	5
Mirandés (loan)	2021–22	Segunda División	36	6	2	0	—		38	6
Racing Santander	2022–23	Segunda División	40	7	1	0	—		41	7
Racing Santander	2023–24	Segunda División	40	3	1	0	—		41	3
Racing Santander	2024–25	Segunda División	40	3	2	1	2	1	44	5
Racing Santander	2025–26	Segunda División	41	9	1	0	—		42	9
Racing Santander	Total		161	22	5	1	2	1	168	24
Career total			298	51	11	3	2	1	311	55

== Honours ==
Racing Santander

- Segunda División: 2025–26

Individual

- Segunda División top assist provider: 2023–24
