= Marco Sangalli =

Spanish footballer

Personal information
- Full name: Marco Sangalli Fuentes
- Date of birth: 7 February 1992 (age 34)
- Place of birth: San Sebastián, Spain
- Height: 1.79 m (5 ft 10 in)
- Position: Winger

Youth career
- 2001–2011: Real Sociedad

Senior career*
Years	Team	Apps	(Gls)
2011–2014	Real Sociedad B	91	(6)
2013–2015	Real Sociedad	2	(0)
2014–2015	→ Alavés (loan)	36	(0)
2015–2017	Mirandés	75	(8)
2017–2019	Alcorcón	64	(3)
2019–2023	Oviedo	118	(10)
2023–2026	Racing Santander	121	(10)
- * Club domestic league appearances and goals as of 07:37, 5 June 2026 (UTC)

Marco Sangalli Fuentes (born 7 February 1992) is a Spanish professional footballer who plays mainly as a winger.

== Career ==
Born in San Sebastián, Gipuzkoa of Italian descent, Sangalli joined Real Sociedad's youth setup in 2001, aged nine. He made his senior debut with the reserves in the 2011–12 season, in the Segunda División B.

On 24 August 2013, Sangalli made his first-team – and La Liga – debut, playing the last 13 minutes in a 1–1 away draw against Elche CF. On 12 July of the following year, he was loaned to Segunda División club Deportivo Alavés until the end of the campaign.

Sangalli signed a two-year deal with CD Mirandés also of the second division on 26 June 2015. He scored his first goal as a professional on 12 September, helping to a 3–2 away defeat of Alavés.

On 4 July 2017, after suffering relegation, Sangalli moved to AD Alcorcón in the same league on a two-year contract. On 1 July 2019, he joined Real Oviedo still in the second tier on a two-year deal. He netted five times in the league for the latter in his first and second seasons.

Sangalli signed an 18-month contract with Racing de Santander on 24 January 2023. In August 2024, having spent one month away from the club, he agreed to a new one-year deal.

== Personal life ==
Sangalli's younger brother, Luca, is also a footballer. An attacking midfielder, he too was developed at Real Sociedad. His maternal uncle was Miguel Ángel Fuentes, former Real Sociedad player and president.

== Honours ==
Racing Santander

- Segunda División: 2025–26
