= Álvaro Mantilla =

Spanish footballer

Personal information
- Full name: Álvaro Mantilla Pérez
- Date of birth: 9 May 2000 (age 26)
- Place of birth: Maliaño, Spain
- Height: 1.84 m (6 ft 0 in)
- Position: Centre back

Team information
- Current team: Racing Santander
- Number: 2

Youth career
- Bansander
- 2015–2019: Racing Santander

Senior career*
Years	Team	Apps	(Gls)
2019–	Racing Santander	126	(6)
2019–2020	→ Laredo (loan)	19	(0)
- * Club domestic league appearances and goals as of 16 August 2026

Álvaro Mantilla Pérez (born 9 May 2000) is a Spanish professional footballer who plays for Racing de Santander. Mainly a central defender, he can also play as a right-back.

== Career ==
Born in Maliaño, Camargo, Cantabria, Mantilla joined Racing de Santander's youth setup in 2015, from Club Bansander. On 2 August 2019, after finishing his formation, he was loaned to Tercera División side CD Laredo for the season.

Mantilla made his senior debut on 14 September 2019, starting in a 3–0 home win over UD Sámano. He scored his first goal as a senior the following 18 July, netting the opener in a 3–1 home success over CD Tropezón which helped his side to reach the finals of the play-offs; the club ultimately achieved promotion to Segunda División B after 30 years.

Back to Racing for the 2020–21 season, Mantilla became a part of the first team squad also in the third division, being regularly used. On 20 March 2022, he renewed his contract until 2024, and was mainly a backup to Pol Moreno and Pablo Bobadilla as his side achieved promotion to Segunda División.

Mantilla made his professional debut on 11 September 2022, starting in a 2–0 away win over Sporting de Gijón. He scored his first professional goal on 22 October of the following year, netting his team's second in a 3–0 home win over Burgos CF.

Mainly a backup option in the following years, Mantilla renewed his contract until 2028 on 11 April 2024. He became a first-choice during the 2025–26 campaign, scoring twice in 30 matches overall as the club achieved promotion to La Liga as champions.

Mantilla made his debut in the main category of Spanish football on 16 August 2026, starting in a 2–2 home draw against Villarreal CF.

== Honours ==
Racing Santander

- Segunda División: 2025–26
