= Juan Carlos Arana =

Spanish footballer (born 2000)

Personal information
- Full name: Juan Carlos Arana Gómez
- Date of birth: 8 February 2000 (age 26)
- Place of birth: Las Palmas, Spain
- Height: 1.78 m (5 ft 10 in)
- Position: Forward

Team information
- Current team: Racing Santander
- Number: 9

Youth career
- 2006–2007: Unión Viera
- 2007–2010: Acodetti
- 2010–2012: Las Palmas
- 2012–2016: Real Madrid
- 2016: Atlético Madrid
- 2017: Unión Viera
- 2017–2018: Roda
- 2018–2019: Villarreal

Senior career*
Years	Team	Apps	(Gls)
2017	Unión Viera		
2018	Roda	1	(0)
2019–2020	Villarreal C	22	(2)
2020–2023	Villarreal B	68	(22)
2023–2024	Eibar	6	(0)
2023–2024	→ Racing Santander (loan)	37	(13)
2024–	Racing Santander	47	(15)
- * Club domestic league appearances and goals as of 23 August 2026

Juan Carlos Arana Gómez (born 8 February 2000) is a Spanish professional footballer who plays as a forward for Racing de Santander.

== Career ==
Born in Las Palmas, Canary Islands, Arana joined Real Madrid's La Fábrica in July 2012 from UD Las Palmas. In April 2016, he moved to rivals Atlético Madrid, but left the latter after four months and returned to his first team, CF Unión Viera.

Shortly after returning to Unión Viera, Arana made his first team debut for the side in Tercera División. On 13 June 2017, he signed for Villarreal CF and returned to the youth setup, being initially assigned to the affiliate side CD Roda.

Arana played for Roda's first team in 2018, before returning to the Yellow Submarine's structure and appearing for Villarreal's C team in 2019. On 4 September 2020, after already appearing with the reserves, he renewed his contract until 2023.

On 3 November 2021, Arana further extended his deal until 2024, and finished the season with 16 goals as the B-side achieved promotion to Segunda División. He made his professional debut with the B's on 14 August 2022, starting and scoring the second in a 2–0 away win over Racing de Santander.

On 5 January 2023, Arana signed a two-and-a-half-year contract with SD Eibar, also in the second division. On 29 August, after featuring rarely, he was loaned to fellow league team Racing de Santander for the 2023–24 season.

On 28 May 2024, Racing exercised Arana's buyout clause, and he signed a permanent three-year deal with the club. Regularly used afterwards, he saw limited playing time during the 2025–26 campaign due to injuries, featuring in just eight league games as the club achieved promotion to La Liga as champions.

Arana made his debut in the main category of Spanish football on 23 August 2026, replacing Gustavo Puerta late into a 1–0 away loss to Getafe CF.

== Honours ==
Racing Santander

- Segunda División: 2025–26
