= Pol Moreno =

Spanish footballer

Personal information
- Full name: Pol Moreno Sánchez
- Date of birth: 9 May 1994 (age 32)
- Place of birth: Barcelona, Spain
- Height: 1.88 m (6 ft 2 in)
- Position: Centre-back

Youth career
- 2002–2004: Sant Martí Condal
- 2004–2005: Llefià
- 2005–2006: Damm
- 2006–2007: Badalona
- 2007–2011: Júpiter
- 2011–2013: Sant Andreu

Senior career*
Years	Team	Apps	(Gls)
2013–2014	Sant Andreu	32	(4)
2013–2014	→ Masnou (loan)	28	(2)
2014–2016	Sabadell B	66	(4)
2016–2018	Sabadell	68	(2)
2018–2019	Sundsvall	38	(0)
2020–2021	Cornellà	38	(4)
2021–2025	Racing Santander	88	(3)
2025–2026	Goa	13	(2)
- * Club domestic league appearances and goals as of 21:34, 18 May 2026 (UTC)

Pol Moreno Sánchez (born 9 May 1994) is a Spanish professional footballer who plays as a defender.

== Club career ==
Born in Barcelona, Catalonia, Moreno graduated from the youth academy of UE Sant Andreu and made his senior debut in 2013–14 season with CD Masnou in Tercera División. At the end of the season, he switched to CE Sabadell FC and was assigned to the reserve team. On 10 March 2016, he renewed his contract till 2018. Ten days later, he made his first team debut, coming on as a substitute for Adrián Díaz in a 1–0 victory against Villarreal CF B. On 14 October 2017, he made his fiftieth appearance for the club in a 1–1 draw against Atlético Saguntino.

On 13 July 2018, Moreno moved abroad and joined Swedish club GIF Sundsvall. Eight days later, he made his debut for the club in a 2–0 victory against Kalmar FF.
