= Aritz Aldasoro =

Spanish footballer (born 1999)

Personal information
- Full name: Aritz Aldasoro Sarriegi
- Date of birth: 5 June 1999 (age 27)
- Place of birth: Beasain, Spain
- Height: 1.76 m (5 ft 9 in)
- Position: Midfielder

Team information
- Current team: Oviedo (on loan from Racing Santander)
- Number: 16

Youth career
- Real Sociedad

Senior career*
Years	Team	Apps	(Gls)
2017–2019	Real Sociedad C	47	(10)
2019–2022	Real Sociedad B	71	(3)
2022–	Racing Santander	128	(4)
2026–	→ Oviedo (loan)	0	(0)
- * Club domestic league appearances and goals as of 31 May 2026

Aritz Aldasoro Sarriegi (born 5 June 1999) is a Spanish professional footballer who plays as a midfielder for Real Oviedo, on loan from Racing de Santander.

== Career ==
Aldasoro was born in Beasain, Gipuzkoa, Basque Country, and was a Real Sociedad youth graduate. He made his senior debut with the C-team on 26 August 2017, starting in a 0–2 Tercera División away loss against SCD Durango.

Aldasoro first appeared with the reserves on 30 March 2019, playing the last 13 minutes in a 0–1 away loss against SD Leioa in the Segunda División B championship. He was definitely promoted to the B-side ahead of the 2019–20 season after scoring ten goals for the C's, and renewed his contract until 2022 on 1 July 2020.

Aldasoro featured regularly for Sanse during the 2020–21 campaign, scoring once in 20 appearances as his side returned to Segunda División after 59 years. He made his professional debut on 14 August 2021, starting in a 1–0 home win over CD Leganés.

On 30 June 2022, Aldasoro moved to newly-promoted side Racing de Santander on a two-year contract. On 25 June 2025, after being regularly used, he renewed his link until 2029.

On 9 July 2026, after losing his starting spot as his side achieved promotion to La Liga as champions, Aldasoro was loaned to Real Oviedo back in the second division, for one year.
