= 2004–05 Segunda División B =

Segunda División B
- Season: 2004–05
- Champions: Real Madrid B Ponferradina; Alicante; Sevilla B
- Promoted: Real Madrid B Hércules Alicante; Castellón; Lorca

The season 2004–05 of Segunda División B of Spanish football started August 2004 and ended May 2005.

== Group I ==
- Teams of Madrid, Galicia, Balearic Islands and Canary Islands.

- Liguilla de Ascenso:
  - Pontevedra - Promoted to the Second Division
  - Racing de Ferrol - Promoted to the Second Division
  - Celta de Vigo B - Eliminated in the Group A
  - CD Ourense - Eliminated in the Group D

- Promoted to this group from Tercera División:
  - Atlético Arteixo - Founded in: 1949//, Based in: Arteixo, Galicia//, Promoted from: Group 1
  - Navalcarnero - Founded in: 1961//, Based in: Navalcarnero, Madrid//, Promoted from: Group 7
  - Castillo - Founded in: 1960//, Based in: Castillo del Romeral, Canary Islands//, Promoted from: Group 12

- Relegated to this group from Segunda División:
  - Las Palmas - Founded in: 1949//, Based in: Las Palmas, Canary Islands//, Relegated From: Segunda División
  - Leganés - Founded in: 1928//, Based in: Leganés, Madrid//, Relegated From: Segunda División
  - Rayo Vallecano - Founded in: 1924//, Based in: Vallecas, Madrid//, Relegated From: Segunda División

- Relegated to Tercera División:
  - Compostela - Founded in: 1962//, Based in: Santiago de Compostela, Galicia//, Relegated to: Group 1
  - Rayo Majadahonda - Founded in: 1976//, Based in: Majadahonda, Madrid//, Relegated to: Group 7

=== Teams ===
Location of teams in Segunda División B Gr. 1 2004–05
Canary Islands

Team	Founded	Home city	Stadium
RSD Alcalá	1929	Alcalá, Madrid	El Val
Alcorcón	1971	Alcorcón, Madrid	Santo Domingo
Atlético Arteixo	1949	Arteixo, Galicia	Ponte dos Brozos
Atlético de Madrid B	1960	Majadahonda, Madrid	Cerro del Espino
Castillo	1960	Castillo del Romeral, Canary Islands	Municipal de Castillo del Romeral
Celta de Vigo B	1927	Vigo, Galicia	Barreiro
Fuenlabrada	1975	Fuenlabrada, Madrid	La Aldehuela
Fuerteventura	2004	Fuerteventura, Canary Islands	Los Pozos
Lanzarote	1970	Arrecife, Canary Islands	Ciudad Deportiva de Lanzarote
Las Palmas	1949	Las Palmas, Canary Islands	Gran Canaria
Leganés	1928	Leganés, Madrid	Butarque
Mallorca B	1967	Palma, Balearic Islands	Lluís Sitjar
Navalcarnero	1961	Navalcarnero, Madrid	Mariano González
Ourense	1952	Ourense, Galicia	O Couto
Pájara Playas de Jandía	1996	Pájara, Canary Islands	Benito Alonso
Rayo Vallecano	1924	Vallecas, Madrid	Teresa Rivero
Real Madrid B	1930	Las Rozas de Madrid, Madrid	La Ciudad del Fútbol
San Sebastián de los Reyes	1971	San Sebastián de los Reyes, Madrid	Nuevo Matapiñonera
Universidad Las Palmas	1994	Las Palmas, Canary Islands	Alfonso Silva
Vecindario	1962	Vecindario, Canary Islands	Municipal de Vecindario

=== League table ===
Pos	Team	Pld	W	D	L	GF	GA	GD	Pts
1	Real Madrid B (P)	38	22	10	6	60	28	+32	76
2	Universidad Las Palmas	38	21	7	10	44	27	+17	70
3	Rayo Vallecano	38	17	14	7	45	31	+14	65
4	RSD Alcalá	38	17	12	9	38	28	+10	63
5	CD Leganés	38	19	6	13	45	41	+4	63
6	Atlético Madrid B	38	17	9	12	59	40	+19	60
7	UD Las Palmas	38	17	9	12	50	33	+17	60
8	Celta de Vigo B	38	15	12	11	47	48	−1	57
9	CD Ourense	38	15	12	11	43	29	+14	57
10	Castillo CF	38	13	14	11	34	33	+1	53
11	AD Alcorcón	38	13	10	15	56	56	0	49
12	UD Vecindario	38	12	12	14	46	45	+1	48
13	UD Lanzarote	38	11	13	14	44	50	−6	46
14	UD San Sebast. Reyes	38	13	7	18	38	46	−8	46
15	UD Pájara Playas J.	38	10	14	14	41	53	−12	44
16	CF Fuenlabrada	38	10	14	14	43	47	−4	44
17	UD Fuerteventura (R)	38	9	12	17	34	50	−16	39
18	RCD Mallorca B (R)	38	10	7	21	34	45	−11	37
19	CDA Navalcarnero (R)	38	7	9	22	29	63	−34	30
20	Atlético Arteixo (R)	38	5	11	22	32	69	−37	26

Source: BDFutbol
(P) Promoted; (R) Relegated

=== Results ===
Home \ Away	ALCL	ALCR	ART	ATL	CAS	CEL	FUN	FUR	LAN	LPA	LEG	MLL	NAV	OUR	PAJ	RAY	RMA	SAS	UPG	VEC
Alcalá	—	2–0	0–0	1–1	1–2	2–0	1–0	1–1	1–1	1–1	0–1	1–0	1–0	2–1	1–0	0–0	0–0	1–0	3–1	1–0
Alcorcón	4–1	—	3–0	2–5	1–1	3–4	2–2	2–2	6–2	1–0	3–0	1–1	2–0	1–0	5–0	0–1	0–1	0–4	1–0	4–0
Atlético Arteixo	0–1	2–2	—	2–2	2–1	3–4	2–2	2–2	1–1	1–3	0–4	3–1	2–0	0–1	2–2	1–2	2–4	2–1	0–2	0–0
Atlético Madrid B	0–2	0–0	3–0	—	2–1	2–0	3–1	1–1	2–0	4–1	3–1	2–0	3–0	1–2	1–0	1–3	0–2	4–0	2–0	0–0
Castillo	1–0	1–2	2–1	1–0	—	1–1	1–2	1–0	1–1	0–1	0–0	1–0	2–0	0–0	0–0	0–0	1–1	1–0	0–1	1–0
Celta B	2–1	2–1	0–0	1–0	1–1	—	4–3	1–1	1–0	2–0	1–0	0–1	1–1	2–2	3–0	0–2	0–0	0–3	2–1	1–1
Fuenlabrada	1–1	2–1	3–0	3–2	0–1	0–0	—	0–0	1–1	0–0	1–2	1–1	0–0	0–0	2–2	3–2	1–1	2–1	0–2	3–1
Fuerteventura	1–1	3–0	0–1	0–0	3–3	1–1	1–0	—	1–0	1–3	1–0	0–2	0–2	4–2	1–2	1–1	0–1	2–2	1–0	2–1
Lanzarote	3–0	3–2	1–0	1–3	0–1	1–0	1–1	4–0	—	0–2	2–1	2–0	3–0	1–0	3–3	2–0	1–1	1–0	0–1	1–1
Las Palmas	0–2	3–0	4–0	1–1	3–0	2–1	0–0	0–1	0–0	—	1–2	3–2	5–0	0–2	0–0	1–1	1–0	2–0	2–1	0–2
Leganés	0–3	2–0	3–0	3–2	2–1	1–0	1–0	2–0	2–0	0–3	—	3–0	1–0	1–1	2–1	1–0	0–1	1–0	1–0	1–0
Mallorca B	0–1	0–2	1–0	4–1	1–1	1–1	1–2	1–0	6–0	0–1	2–2	—	2–0	0–0	1–0	0–1	0–1	1–2	0–2	0–1
Navalcarnero	3–1	0–1	0–0	2–5	0–0	2–1	0–1	1–0	2–2	0–1	2–2	2–0	—	1–1	1–1	1–4	0–4	3–0	0–2	1–1
Ourense	0–1	1–1	5–1	1–0	2–1	0–1	1–0	2–0	0–0	1–0	2–0	1–2	3–1	—	2–0	1–0	0–1	1–2	0–1	1–0
Pájara PJ	0–0	0–0	2–0	1–1	1–2	0–1	2–1	2–1	1–0	1–1	3–0	2–1	1–3	1–5	—	4–1	2–3	1–0	0–0	3–1
Rayo Vallecano	2–0	1–1	2–1	2–0	1–0	1–1	1–0	3–1	1–0	0–0	2–0	0–1	1–0	0–0	2–2	—	0–2	0–0	0–0	3–2
Real Madrid B	0–0	5–0	1–0	0–1	1–0	1–4	4–2	2–0	2–1	0–2	2–1	0–0	3–1	1–1	4–0	2–2	—	1–0	0–1	3–0
SS Reyes	0–2	3–1	2–0	0–1	1–1	0–1	2–3	1–0	1–0	2–1	1–1	1–0	1–0	0–0	0–0	1–2	1–1	—	1–0	3–1
Universidad LPGC	1–1	1–0	2–1	0–0	0–0	4–0	1–0	2–0	3–3	1–0	3–1	1–0	2–0	1–0	1–0	1–1	0–4	3–0	—	2–1
Vecindario	1–0	1–1	0–0	1–0	1–2	5–2	1–0	0–1	2–2	3–2	0–0	3–1	3–0	1–1	1–1	0–0	3–0	5–2	2–0	—

Source: BDFutbol
Legend: Blue = home team win; Yellow = draw; Red = away team win.

=== Top goalscorers ===
Goalscorers	Team	Goals
(Spain) Roberto Soldado	Real Madrid B	21
(Spain) Alejandro Suárez	UD Lanzarote	18
(Spain) Geni	Rayo Vallecano	16
(Spain) Quini Álvarez	AD Alcorcón	16
(Spain) Marcos Márquez	CD Leganés	14

== Group II ==
- Teams of Basque Country, Castile and León, Cantabria, Asturias and La Rioja.

- Liguilla de Ascenso:
  - Atlético Madrid B - Eliminated on Group C
  - Real Madrid B - Eliminated on Group D
  - CD Mirandés - Eliminated on Group B
  - Cultural y Deportiva Leonesa - Eliminated on Group A

- Promoted to this group from Tercera División:
  - Marino de Luanco - Founded in: 1931//, Based in: Luanco, Asturias//, Promoted from: Group 2
  - Sestao River Club - Founded in: 1996//, Based in: Sestao, Basque Country//, Promoted from: Group 4
  - Lemona - Founded in: 1923//, Based in: Lemoa, Basque Country //, Promoted from: Group 4
  - Guijuelo - Founded in: 1974//, Based in: Guijuelo, Castile and León//, Promoted from: Group 8

- Relegated to this group from Segunda División:
  - None

- Relegated to Tercera División:
  - Logroñés - Founded in: 1940//, Based in: Logroño, La Rioja//, Relegated to: Group 15
  - Racing Santander B - Founded in: 1993//, Based in: Santander, Cantabria//, Relegated to: Group 3
  - Calahorra - Founded in: 1923//, Based in: Calahorra, La Rioja//, Relegated to: Group 15
  - Caudal - Founded in: 1918//, Based in: Mieres, Asturias//, Relegated to: Group 2
  - Real Avilés Industrial - Founded in: 1903//, Based in: Avilés, Asturias//, Relegated to: Group 2

=== Teams ===
Location of teams in Segunda División B Gr. 2 2004–05

Team	Founded	Home city	Stadium
Alavés B	1960	Vitoria, Basque Country	José Luis Compañón
Alfaro	1922	Alfaro, La Rioja	La Molineta
Amurrio	1949	Amurrio, Basque Country	Basarte
Athletic Bilbao B	1964	Bilbao, Basque Country	Lezama
Barakaldo	1917	Barakaldo, Basque Country	Lasesarre
Burgos	1994	Burgos, Castile and León	El Plantío
Cultural Leonesa	1923	León, Castile and León	Reino de León
Gimnástica Torrelavega	1907	Torrelavega, Cantabria	El Malecón
Guijuelo	1974	Guijuelo, Castile and León	Municipal de Guijuelo
Haro	1914	Haro, La Rioja	El Mazo
Lemona	1923	Lemoa, Basque Country	Arlonagusia
Marino de Luanco	1931	Luanco, Asturias	Miramar
Mirandés	1927	Miranda de Ebro, Castile and León	Anduva
Palencia	1975	Palencia, Castile and León	La Balastera
Ponferradina	1922	Ponferrada, Castile and León	El Toralín
Real Sociedad B	1951	Usurbil, Basque Country	Zubieta
Real Unión	1915	Irún, Basque Country	Stadium Gal
Recreación	2000	Logroño, La Rioja	Las Gaunas
Sestao River	1996	Sestao, Basque Country	Las Llanas
Zamora	1968	Zamora, Castile and León	Ruta de la Plata

=== League Table ===
Pos	Team	Pld	W	D	L	GF	GA	GD	Pts
1	SD Ponferradina	38	18	15	5	43	28	+15	69
2	Real Unión Club	38	18	14	6	47	27	+20	68
3	Burgos CF	38	17	12	9	44	24	+20	63
4	Zamora CF	38	17	11	10	39	30	+9	62
5	Real Sociedad B	38	16	14	8	41	29	+12	62
6	CD Recreación	38	16	12	10	37	36	+1	60
7	Barakaldo CF	38	15	14	9	41	32	+9	59
8	SD Lemona	38	14	16	8	34	26	+8	58
9	Athletic de Bilbao B	38	16	9	13	53	43	+10	57
10	Cultural Leonesa	38	14	14	10	52	40	+12	56
11	Amurrio Club	38	11	18	9	33	25	+8	51
12	Dep. Alavés B	38	12	15	11	38	36	+2	51
13	CF Palencia	38	11	12	15	40	41	−1	45
14	CD Alfaro	38	10	13	15	42	53	−11	43
15	Marino de Luanco	38	11	9	18	39	48	−9	42
16	CD Mirandés	38	9	15	14	26	35	−9	42
17	CD Guijuelo (R)	38	9	12	17	37	48	−11	39
18	Gimnás. Torrelavega (R)	38	8	8	22	29	58	−29	32
19	Sestao River (R)	38	7	11	20	34	54	−20	32
20	Haro Deportivo (R)	38	4	10	24	18	54	−36	22

Source: BDFutbol
(R) Relegated

=== Results ===
Home \ Away	ALV	ALF	AMU	ATH	BAR	BUR	CUL	GIM	GUI	HAR	LEM	MAR	MIR	PAL	PON	RSO	RUN	REC	SES	ZAM
Alavés B	—	3–0	0–0	1–3	1–2	0–0	2–1	2–1	1–1	1–2	2–1	2–1	0–1	2–0	1–1	1–1	0–0	0–3	1–0	0–0
Alfaro	2–2	—	1–0	2–2	0–0	0–1	2–1	2–0	1–0	0–1	1–0	2–2	1–1	1–1	1–4	1–1	2–0	2–1	1–1	0–3
Amurrio	0–0	0–0	—	1–1	1–1	1–2	2–1	2–1	2–0	2–0	1–2	0–0	0–0	1–2	0–0	0–0	1–1	0–1	0–0	1–0
Athletic Bilbao B	2–1	2–1	2–2	—	5–1	0–0	1–2	2–0	2–0	2–0	1–0	3–0	3–0	1–1	0–2	1–0	1–3	0–1	3–1	4–1
Barakaldo	3–0	2–0	2–0	0–1	—	1–1	1–2	1–0	0–0	1–0	1–1	2–1	0–0	0–0	0–1	1–0	3–1	1–2	2–1	1–0
Burgos	0–0	3–0	1–0	3–1	1–3	—	1–0	3–0	1–0	0–0	3–0	3–0	2–1	0–0	2–2	0–2	0–1	1–2	3–0	1–2
Cultural Leonesa	0–0	4–3	1–1	2–0	2–2	3–1	—	1–1	3–0	4–0	1–1	3–0	2–0	2–1	1–1	0–3	1–2	1–1	1–1	1–1
Gim. Torrelavega	3–2	1–0	0–2	1–2	0–2	0–0	0–0	—	2–1	0–0	0–1	0–0	1–1	1–5	0–3	0–2	0–0	3–1	2–1	2–0
Guijuelo	1–1	2–1	0–1	2–0	0–0	2–2	1–2	2–1	—	2–0	0–0	3–2	3–1	1–2	1–0	2–4	1–1	4–2	2–0	0–0
Haro	0–0	1–4	0–0	0–2	1–1	0–1	0–1	2–3	1–1	—	0–0	1–1	1–1	2–5	1–0	1–2	1–2	0–1	1–0	0–2
Lemona	1–1	2–1	1–0	4–2	2–0	0–0	1–0	3–0	1–0	1–0	—	1–1	1–0	1–0	0–0	1–1	1–1	0–1	2–1	1–1
Marino	1–2	2–0	1–3	1–1	1–0	0–2	1–1	3–0	2–1	2–1	1–0	—	1–0	2–1	0–1	0–1	4–0	1–1	3–0	1–0
Mirandés	0–2	1–1	0–2	1–0	0–1	0–1	1–1	1–0	3–2	0–0	0–0	1–0	—	0–3	4–0	0–0	0–0	0–1	1–0	3–0
Palencia	0–2	0–1	0–0	2–1	0–0	0–2	1–2	3–0	1–1	3–0	0–2	1–0	0–0	—	0–0	2–2	0–0	0–0	1–3	0–2
Ponferradina	1–0	3–2	0–0	1–0	1–1	0–0	3–2	1–0	3–0	2–1	0–0	3–1	0–0	2–1	—	1–0	0–4	2–2	2–1	0–0
R. Sociedad B	2–1	0–0	1–2	1–1	1–0	1–0	1–0	3–2	1–0	2–0	1–1	1–0	0–0	2–0	0–0	—	1–2	0–0	0–4	0–0
Real Unión	2–1	2–2	1–1	3–0	0–0	0–0	0–0	1–0	1–0	2–0	1–1	2–0	2–0	2–0	0–1	2–0	—	1–2	4–1	1–1
Recreación	0–2	0–0	1–1	1–0	3–2	0–3	1–0	0–2	1–1	1–0	0–0	1–0	0–1	2–1	0–0	0–2	0–1	—	0–0	3–1
Sestao River	0–1	1–3	0–3	1–1	0–1	1–0	2–2	2–2	0–0	1–0	1–0	3–3	2–1	0–1	2–1	1–1	0–1	1–1	—	1–2
Zamora	0–0	3–1	1–0	0–0	2–2	1–0	0–1	1–0	2–0	1–0	2–0	1–0	2–2	1–2	0–1	2–1	1–0	2–0	1–0	—

Source: BDFutbol
Legend: Blue = home team win; Yellow = draw; Red = away team win.

=== Top goalscorers ===
Goalscorers	Team	Goals
(Venezuela) Carlos García Becerra	Burgos CF	17
(Spain) Mikel Arruabarrena	Athletic Bilbao B	15
(Spain) Paulino	Cultural y Deportiva Leonesa	14
(Spain) Aiert	Zamora CF	13
(Spain) Gorka de Carlos	Real Unión	12

== Group III ==
- Teams of Catalonia, Valencian Community, Aragon and Navarre.

- Liguilla de Ascenso:
  - Lleida - Promoted to Second Division
  - Lorca - Eliminated on Group B
  - Gimnàstic de Tarragona - Promoted to Second Division
  - Castellón - Eliminated on Group C

- Promoted to this group from Tercera División:
  - Badalona - Founded in: 1903//, Based in: Badalona, Catalonia//, Promoted from: Group 5
  - Benidorm - Founded in: 1964//, Based in: Benidorm, Valencian Community//, Promoted from: Group 6
  - Alcoyano - Founded in: 1928//, Based in: Alcoy, Valencian Community //, Promoted from: Group 6
  - Levante B - Founded in: 1962//, Based in: Buñol, Valencian Community //, Promoted from: Group 6
  - Peralta - Founded in: 1927//, Based in: Peralta, Navarre //, Promoted from: Group 15

- Relegated to this group from Segunda División:
  - None

- Relegated to Tercera División:
  - Valencia B - Founded in: 1944//, Based in: Valencia, Valencian Community//, Relegated to: Group 6
  - Mataró - Founded in: 1912//, Based in: Mataró, Catalonia//, Relegated to: Group 5
  - Palamós - Founded in: 1898//, Based in: Palamós, Catalonia//, Relegated to: Group 5
  - Casetas - Founded in: 1922//, Based in: Casetas, Aragon//, Relegated to: Group 16

=== Teams ===
Location of teams in Segunda División B Gr. 3 2004–05

Team	Founded	Home city	Stadium
Alcoyano	1928	Alcoy, Valencian Community	El Collao
Alicante	1918	Alicante, Valencian Community	José Rico Pérez
Badalona	1903	Badalona, Catalonia	Camp del Centenari
Barcelona B	1970	Barcelona, Catalonia	Mini Estadi
Benidorm	1964	Benidorm, Valencian Community	Foietes
Castellón	1922	Castellón de la Plana, Valencian Community	Nou Castàlia
Espanyol B	1981	Sant Adrià de Besòs, Catalonia	Ciutat Esportiva RCD Espanyol
Figueres	1919	Figueres, Catalonia	Vilatenim
Girona	1930	Girona, Catalonia	Montilivi
Gramenet	1994	Santa Coloma de Gramenet, Catalonia	Nou Camp Municipal
Hércules Alicante	1922	Alicante, Valencian Community	José Rico Pérez
Huesca	1960	Huesca, Aragon	El Alcoraz
Levante B	1962	Buñol, Valencian Community	Ciudad Deportiva de Buñol
Novelda	1925	Novelda, Valencian Community	La Magdalena
Osasuna B	1962	Aranguren, Navarre	Tajonar
Peña Sport	1925	Tafalla, Navarre	San Francisco
Peralta	1927	Peralta, Navarre	Las Luchas
Sabadell	1903	Sabadell, Catalonia	Nova Creu Alta
Villajoyosa CF	1944	Villajoyosa, Valencian Community	Nou Pla
Zaragoza B	1958	Zaragoza, Aragon	Ciudad Deportiva del Real Zaragoza

=== League Table ===
Pos	Team	Pld	W	D	L	GF	GA	GD	Pts
1	Alicante CF	38	22	10	6	61	24	+37	76
2	Hércules CF (P)	38	18	11	9	45	36	+9	65
3	Levante UD B	38	16	13	9	39	24	+15	61
4	CD Castellón (P)	38	17	10	11	34	24	+10	61
5	Real Zaragoza B	38	17	10	11	46	31	+15	61
6	Villajoyosa CF	38	17	7	14	47	42	+5	58
7	CD Alcoyano	38	14	10	14	48	50	−2	52
8	UE Figueres	38	12	15	11	39	40	−1	51
9	CF Badalona	38	13	11	14	39	38	+1	50
10	SD Huesca	38	11	16	11	36	40	−4	49
11	FC Barcelona B	38	12	13	13	42	39	+3	49
12	Benidorm CD	38	12	12	14	35	43	−8	48
13	CE Sabadell	38	11	13	14	43	49	−6	46
14	CM Peralta	38	12	10	16	35	48	−13	46
15	CA Osasuna B	38	10	15	13	31	47	−16	45
16	UDA Gramenet	38	10	15	13	30	34	−4	45
17	Girona FC (R)	38	10	15	13	40	49	−9	45
18	RCD Espanyol B (R)	38	13	6	19	56	47	+9	45
19	Novelda CF (R)	38	8	16	14	31	37	−6	40
20	CD Peña Sport (R)	38	6	10	22	17	52	−35	28

Source: BDFutbol
(P) Promoted; (R) Relegated

=== Results ===
Home \ Away	ALC	ALI	BAD	BAR	BEN	CAS	ESP	FIG	GIR	GRA	HER	HUE	LEV	NOV	OSA	PEÑ	PER	SAB	VIJ	ZAR
Alcoyano	—	1–3	3–2	2–1	1–2	1–0	3–1	2–1	0–0	3–1	1–2	0–1	0–1	0–1	2–0	0–1	1–0	3–0	3–1	2–2
Alicante	6–0	—	1–0	0–0	3–1	0–1	1–0	2–0	2–0	2–0	1–2	2–1	0–1	2–1	5–0	4–0	0–0	1–1	1–0	2–0
Badalona	2–1	0–0	—	1–1	3–0	0–0	1–4	0–1	1–1	1–1	1–1	1–0	1–1	2–0	1–0	3–0	2–0	3–2	2–1	2–0
Barcelona B	2–0	3–0	2–1	—	0–0	1–2	2–0	2–2	1–2	0–0	0–0	3–4	0–2	2–1	4–0	1–0	2–1	0–0	1–0	0–1
Benidorm	0–1	1–0	1–0	1–1	—	2–1	0–3	1–2	0–0	0–0	1–1	0–0	2–2	0–0	3–2	3–0	0–2	0–2	1–2	0–2
Castellón	0–0	0–0	0–0	0–1	1–0	—	1–0	3–2	2–1	2–0	2–0	2–1	0–1	1–0	3–1	2–0	0–1	4–2	1–0	1–0
Espanyol B	5–1	1–2	1–2	1–1	2–3	1–1	—	1–1	5–1	2–1	3–0	0–0	1–2	0–2	0–1	2–0	6–2	3–1	2–0	1–3
Figueres	0–0	2–2	2–0	2–2	2–0	1–0	0–2	—	1–1	0–0	1–3	0–1	2–0	2–1	2–1	2–1	3–1	2–2	1–0	1–1
Girona	3–3	1–0	0–1	1–0	1–0	1–0	2–1	1–1	—	2–1	2–0	1–1	0–0	1–1	0–1	3–0	2–2	2–5	0–2	0–2
Gramenet	3–2	1–1	1–0	1–3	1–2	0–1	1–0	1–1	2–1	—	0–1	2–1	0–0	2–1	1–1	0–0	4–0	1–0	1–0	0–0
Hércules	1–3	0–1	1–1	1–0	1–1	0–0	1–0	1–0	1–0	1–2	—	1–1	2–2	2–1	2–0	4–1	2–0	1–1	3–0	2–1
Huesca	2–1	0–0	3–1	0–0	0–1	2–0	2–1	2–0	0–0	1–1	0–0	—	0–5	1–1	0–0	0–2	0–2	1–0	4–2	1–4
Levante B	1–0	1–2	1–0	0–1	1–0	1–0	0–2	0–0	0–1	1–0	3–0	2–0	—	0–0	0–0	0–0	2–2	0–0	0–2	2–0
Novelda	1–3	0–1	0–0	2–2	1–1	0–0	0–0	1–1	2–0	0–0	2–1	0–0	2–0	—	0–0	2–0	2–1	1–1	1–3	1–2
Osasuna B	1–1	0–0	2–1	4–2	1–3	1–1	3–1	0–1	2–2	1–0	1–1	1–1	1–0	0–0	—	1–0	0–2	1–0	0–0	1–4
Peña Sport	0–1	0–5	1–2	0–0	0–1	0–1	1–1	0–0	4–3	0–0	0–1	0–0	0–3	0–0	0–0	—	0–1	4–1	0–0	1–0
Peralta	1–1	1–2	0–0	1–0	1–0	0–0	1–3	2–0	1–1	1–0	0–3	2–2	1–3	1–0	0–0	1–0	—	1–1	2–0	0–2
Sabadell	0–0	1–2	2–0	1–0	2–3	2–1	2–0	2–0	1–1	0–0	0–1	0–0	1–1	1–0	1–1	1–0	1–0	—	4–1	2–4
Villajoyosa	1–1	2–2	2–1	2–1	1–1	1–0	1–0	1–0	2–1	2–1	0–1	0–2	0–0	3–1	3–1	3–0	2–1	5–0	—	2–1
Zaragoza B	1–1	1–3	1–0	3–0	0–0	0–0	1–0	0–0	1–1	0–0	3–0	2–1	1–0	1–2	0–1	0–1	1–0	1–0	0–0	—

Source: BDFutbol
Legend: Blue = home team win; Yellow = draw; Red = away team win.

=== Top goalscorers ===
Goalscorers	Team	Goals
(Spain) Sendoa Agirre	Alicante CF	18
(France) Philippe Toledo	Real Zaragoza B	17
(Spain) Jonathan Soriano	RCD Espanyol B	15
(Spain) Álvaro Ordóñez	Benidorm CD	13
(Spain) Jordi Martínez	Hércules CF	12

== Group IV ==
- Teams of Andalusia, Extremadura, Castile La Mancha, Ceuta, Melilla and Murcia.

- Liguilla de Ascenso:
  - Lanzarote - Eliminated on Group D
  - Pájara Playas - Eliminated on Group A
  - Sevilla B - Eliminated on Group C
  - Badajoz - Eliminated on Group B

- Promoted to this group from Tercera División:
  - Arenas CyD - Founded in: 1931//, Based in: Armilla, Granada, Andalusia//, Promoted from: Group 9
  - Alcalá - Founded in: 1945//, Based in: Alcalá de Guadaíra, Andalusia//, Promoted from: Group 10
  - Don Benito - Founded in: 1928//, Based in: Don Benito, Extremadura //, Promoted from: Group 14
  - Díter Zafra - Founded in: 1930//, Based in: Zafra, Extremadura //, Promoted from: Group 14

- Relegated to this group from Segunda División:
  - Algeciras - Founded in: 1909/, Based in: Algeciras, Andalusia//, Relegated From: Second Division

- Relegated to Tercera División:
  - Real Betis B - Founded in: 1969//, Based in: Seville, Andalusia//, Relegated to: Group X
  - Cacereño - Founded in: 1919//, Based in: Cáceres, Extremadura//, Relegated to: Group XIV
  - Mérida - Founded in: 1990//, Based in: Mérida, Extremadura//, Relegated to: Group XIV
  - Villanovense - Founded in: 1992//, Based in: Villanueva de la Serena, Extremadura//, Relegated to: Group XIV
  - Los Palacios - Founded in: 1964//, Based in: Los Palacios y Villafranca, Andalusia//, Relegated to: Group X

=== Teams ===
Location of teams in Segunda División B Gr. 4 2004–05

Team	Founded	Home city	Stadium
Alcalá	1945	Alcalá de Guadaíra, Andalusia	Ciudad de Alcalá
Algeciras	1912	Algeciras, Andalusia	Nuevo Mirador
Arenas	1931	Armilla, Andalusia	Municipal Armilla
Badajoz	1905	Badajoz, Extremadura	Nuevo Vivero
Cartagena	1995	Cartagena, Region of Murcia	Cartagonova
Ceuta	1996	Ceuta	Alfonso Murube
Conquense	1946	Cuenca, Castilla–La Mancha	La Fuensanta
Díter Zafra	1930	Zafra, Extremadura	Nuevo Estadio
Don Benito	1928	Don Benito, Extremadura	Vicente Sanz
Écija	1939	Écija, Andalusia	San Pablo
Extremadura	1924	Almendralejo, Extremadura	Francisco de la Hera
Real Jaén	1922	Jaén, Andalusia	Nuevo La Victoria
Jerez	1969	Jerez de los Caballeros, Extremadura	Manuel Calzado Galván
Linares	1990	Linares, Andalusia	Linarejos
Lorca	2002	Lorca, Region of Murcia	Francisco Artés Carrasco
Marbella	1997	Marbella, Andalusia	Municipal Marbella
Melilla	1976	Melilla	Álvarez Claro
Sevilla B	1958	Seville, Andalusia	José Ramón Cisneros Palacios
Talavera	1948	Talavera de la Reina, Castilla–La Mancha	El Prado
Tomelloso	1979	Tomelloso, Castilla–La Mancha	Paco Gálvez

=== League Table ===
Pos	Team	Pld	W	D	L	GF	GA	GD	Pts
1	Sevilla B	38	19	9	10	52	29	+23	66
2	UB Conquense	38	19	9	10	43	31	+12	66
3	AD Ceuta	38	17	14	7	38	22	+16	65
4	Lorca Deportiva CF (P)	38	17	10	11	61	39	+22	61
5	UD Marbella	38	16	11	11	46	42	+4	59
6	Algeciras CF	38	13	15	10	26	25	+1	54
7	CD Badajoz	38	14	11	13	50	43	+7	53
8	UD Melilla	38	13	13	12	43	37	+6	52
9	Real Jaén	38	11	18	9	35	34	+1	51
10	CF Extremadura	38	12	14	12	45	39	+6	50
11	CD Linares	38	12	14	12	30	29	+1	50
12	Écija Balompié	38	14	8	16	30	46	−16	50
13	FC Cartagena	38	12	13	13	31	30	+1	49
14	CD Díter Zafra	38	12	13	13	30	42	−12	49
15	CD Alcalá de G.	38	11	15	12	37	43	−6	48
16	Talavera CF	38	10	16	12	35	34	+1	46
17	Tomelloso CF (R)	38	9	15	14	26	41	−15	42
18	CD Don Benito (R)	38	7	15	16	22	36	−14	36
19	Jerez CF (R)	38	8	12	18	26	47	−21	36
20	Arenas CyD (R)	38	5	13	20	32	49	−17	28

Source: BDFutbol
(P) Promoted; (R) Relegated

=== Results ===
Home \ Away	ALC	ALG	ARE	BAD	CAR	CEU	COQ	DIT	DON	ECI	EXT	JAE	JER	LIN	LOR	MAR	MEL	SEV	TAL	TOM
Alcalá	—	1–0	3–1	1–1	2–2	0–1	1–3	1–0	0–2	1–0	1–0	2–4	3–0	1–1	0–0	2–1	0–0	1–1	1–1	3–0
Algeciras	2–1	—	1–0	1–0	1–0	1–2	0–0	1–0	1–1	1–1	1–0	0–0	2–1	1–0	0–0	2–0	0–0	0–2	1–0	3–3
Arenas	2–0	0–1	—	3–0	0–1	0–0	0–2	0–1	1–1	3–0	1–1	0–1	1–1	2–1	4–0	0–1	2–2	1–1	1–1	0–1
Badajoz	1–1	0–0	3–0	—	2–3	1–1	1–0	0–1	0–2	2–0	2–2	1–0	2–1	4–1	2–0	4–1	0–2	3–0	0–0	2–0
Cartagena	1–2	1–0	2–0	1–1	—	0–0	1–1	0–0	3–0	0–1	3–1	1–3	0–1	0–0	0–1	2–0	2–1	0–1	0–0	1–0
Ceuta	1–1	1–0	2–0	0–0	1–1	—	0–1	2–1	1–0	2–0	1–0	0–0	3–0	1–1	0–1	2–2	2–0	1–0	1–1	3–0
Conquense	1–0	0–1	0–0	2–1	1–1	1–0	—	4–1	1–0	1–2	1–0	0–0	1–0	0–0	2–1	1–0	0–1	2–1	2–1	3–0
Díter Zafra	0–0	0–0	2–0	0–2	0–2	0–1	2–1	—	1–1	2–1	2–2	3–1	1–1	1–0	1–0	0–2	1–0	1–0	2–1	0–0
Don Benito	0–0	0–0	1–1	2–3	0–1	0–1	1–2	1–0	—	1–2	0–2	0–0	1–0	1–0	2–1	0–0	1–1	0–3	0–1	1–0
Écija	2–3	2–1	2–0	2–1	1–0	0–1	2–0	1–2	1–0	—	0–0	1–0	1–0	0–0	0–3	0–3	0–3	0–2	2–0	1–1
Extremadura	2–2	0–0	3–0	1–1	1–0	1–1	0–0	2–0	0–0	2–1	—	3–0	1–0	1–2	2–1	4–0	1–1	2–3	1–1	1–1
Real Jaén	1–0	1–0	2–1	1–1	0–0	1–1	3–1	0–0	1–1	0–0	1–0	—	1–1	0–2	1–2	3–0	1–0	0–0	2–2	0–0
Jerez	0–0	0–0	1–1	1–0	1–0	1–0	0–1	1–1	0–0	1–1	0–2	3–3	—	2–0	4–2	0–1	0–1	2–1	0–0	0–0
Linares	1–0	1–1	1–0	0–0	0–0	1–0	0–1	0–0	1–0	0–0	0–1	0–0	3–0	—	2–0	0–1	2–1	1–0	3–0	1–1
Lorca	4–0	2–0	4–4	2–0	0–0	1–2	0–0	7–1	2–1	6–0	3–1	2–1	3–0	1–0	—	5–0	1–1	1–0	2–1	1–1
Marbella	3–0	1–1	0–0	1–2	0–1	1–1	3–2	1–1	3–0	1–1	0–0	3–1	4–0	3–1	2–0	—	2–0	1–5	1–0	3–1
Melilla	0–2	3–1	2–1	3–2	2–0	0–1	1–3	1–1	0–0	0–1	2–3	0–0	1–0	2–2	1–1	0–0	—	1–0	4–0	3–0
Sevilla B	1–1	1–0	2–1	5–3	2–0	2–0	2–1	2–0	0–0	1–0	2–0	1–2	3–0	1–1	2–0	0–0	2–2	—	1–0	0–0
Talavera	3–0	0–0	0–0	2–0	2–0	1–1	3–0	1–1	1–1	2–0	3–1	2–0	0–2	0–1	0–0	0–0	2–0	0–2	—	2–0
Tomelloso	0–0	0–1	2–1	0–2	1–1	1–0	1–1	2–0	1–0	0–1	2–1	0–0	2–1	2–0	1–1	0–1	0–1	1–0	1–1	—

Source: BDFutbol
Legend: Blue = home team win; Yellow = draw; Red = away team win.

=== Top goalscorers ===
Goalscorers	Team	Goals
(Spain) Kepa Blanco	Sevilla FC B	23
(Spain) Andrés Ramos	UD Marbella	20
(Spain) Santi Castillejo	UB Conquense	17
(Spain) Aitor Huegún	Lorca Deportiva CF	17
(Argentina) Pablo Guede	UD Melilla	17
