= 2005–06 Elche CF season =

Elche
2005–06 season
- Head coach: Josu Uribe; Julián Rubio
- Stadium: Estadio Manuel Martínez Valero
- Segunda División: 14th
- Copa del Rey: Round of 16
- Top goalscorer: League: Nino (13); All: Nino (13)

The 2005–06 season was the 83rd season in the history of Elche CF and the club's seventh consecutive season in the second division of Spanish football. In addition to the domestic league, Elche participated in this season's edition of the Copa del Rey.

== Transfers ==
=== In ===
No.	Pos.	Player	Transferred from	Fee	Date	Source
	FW	(Poland) Tomasz Frankowski	(Poland) Wisła Kraków	€1,400,000		
	MF	(Spain) Alberto Ruiz	(Spain) Getafe	Free		
	CF	(Spain) Quique Medina	(Spain) Getafe	Free		
	MF	(Spain) Francisco Katxorro	(Spain) Xerez	Free		
	FW	(France) Philippe Toledo	(Spain) Deportivo Aragón	Free		

=== Out ===
No.	Pos.	Player	Transferred to	Fee	Date	Source
	FW	(Poland) Tomasz Frankowski	(England) Wolverhampton Wanderers	€2,000,000		
	GK	(Argentina) Willy Caballero	(Argentina) Arsenal de Sarandí	Loan		

== Competitions ==
=== Overall record ===
Competition	First match	Last match	Starting round	Final position	Record							
Competition	First match	Last match	Starting round	Final position	Pld	W	D	L	GF	GA	GD	Win %
Segunda División	28 August 2005	17 June 2006	Matchday 1	14th	42	13	14	15	47	54	−7	30.95
Copa del Rey	31 August 2005		First round	First round	1	0	0	1	2	3	−1	0.00
Total					43	13	14	16	49	57	−8	30.23

Source: Competitions

=== Segunda División ===
==== League table ====
Pos	Team	Pld	W	D	L	GF	GA	GD	Pts
12	Castellón	42	14	12	16	46	50	−4	54 (Note: CAS 0–0 ALB; ALB 1–1 CAS)
13	Albacete	42	14	12	16	44	57	−13	54
14	Elche	42	13	14	15	47	54	−7	53 (Note: ELC 2–0 EJI; EJI 2–1 ELC)
15	Poli Ejido	42	15	8	19	43	50	−7	53
16	Murcia	42	13	13	16	41	40	+1	52 (Note: HÉR 1–1 MUR; MUR 3–1 HÉR)

Source: BDFutbol
Rules for classification: 1st points; 2nd head-to-head points; 3rd head-to-head goal difference; 4th head-to-head goals scored; 5th goal difference; 6th number of goals scored; 7th Fair-play points

==== Results summary ====
Overall								Home						Away					
Pld	W	D	L	GF	GA	GD	Pts	W	D	L	GF	GA	GD	W	D	L	GF	GA	GD
42	13	14	15	47	54	−7	53	9	8	4	28	21	+7	4	6	11	19	33	−14

Source: BDFutbol

==== Results by round ====
Round	1	2	3	4	5	6	7	8	9	10	11	12	13	14	15	16	17	18	19	20	21	22	23	24	25	26	27	28	29	30	31	32	33	34	35	36	37	38	39	40	41	42
Ground	A	H	A	H	A	H	H	A	H	A	H	A	H	A	H	A	H	A	H	A	H	H	A	H	A	H	A	A	H	A	H	A	H	A	H	A	H	A	H	A	H	A
Result	W	L	L	W	L	W	D	W	W	L	W	L	D	D	W	W	D	L	D	D	L	D	L	L	L	W	D	L	W	L	D	W	W	L	L	L	W	D	D	D	D	D
Position	6	13	15	11	14	9	13	8	5	7	5	8	8	9	7	5	5	7	7	7	10	9	12	14	14	12	13	14	13	13	13	11	10	11	13	17	14	12	13	15	14	14

Source: BDFutbol
A = Away; H = Home; W = Win; D = Draw; L = Loss

==== Matches ====
28 August 2005 1	Eibar	1–2	Elche	Eibar
				Stadium: Ipurua Municipal Stadium

4 September 2005 2	Elche	1–3	Lorca Deportiva	Elche
				Stadium: Estadio Manuel Martínez Valero

11 September 2005 3	Levante	1–0	Elche	Valencia
				Stadium: Estadi Ciutat de València

18 September 2005 4	Elche	2–0	Poli Ejido	Elche
				Stadium: Estadio Manuel Martínez Valero

24 September 2005 5	Racing Ferrol	2–1	Elche	Ferrol
				Stadium: Estadio Municipal da Malata

2 October 2005 6	Elche	3–2	Lleida	Elche
				Stadium: Estadio Manuel Martínez Valero

9 October 2005 7	Elche	1–1	Murcia	Elche
				Stadium: Estadio Manuel Martínez Valero

15 October 2005 8	Albacete	1–2	Elche	Albacete
				Stadium: Estadio Carlos Belmonte

22 October 2005 9	Elche	1–0	Gimnàstic de Tarragona	Elche
				Stadium: Estadio Manuel Martínez Valero

30 October 2005 10	Recreativo	2–0	Elche	Huelva
				Stadium: Estadio Nuevo Colombino

6 November 2005 11	Elche	2–0	Málaga B	Elche
				Stadium: Estadio Manuel Martínez Valero

13 November 2005 12	Real Madrid Castilla	4–0	Elche	Madrid
				Stadium: Ciudad Real Madrid

19 November 2005 13	Elche	0–0	Almería	Elche
				Stadium: Estadio Manuel Martínez Valero

27 November 2005 14	Castellón	1–1	Elche	Castellón de la Plana
				Stadium: Nou Estadi Castàlia

4 December 2005 15	Elche	4–1	Numancia	Elche
				Stadium: Estadio Manuel Martínez Valero

11 December 2005 16	Xerez	1–2	Elche	Jerez de la Frontera
				Stadium: Estadio Municipal de Chapín

18 December 2005 17	Elche	1–1	Hércules	Elche
				Stadium: Estadio Manuel Martínez Valero

21 December 2005 18	Ciudad de Murcia	4–1	Elche	Murcia
				Stadium: Estadio de La Condomina

7 January 2006 19	Elche	2–2	Tenerife	Elche
				Stadium: Estadio Manuel Martínez Valero

15 January 2006 20	Sporting Gijón	2–2	Elche	Gijón
				Stadium: El Molinón

22 January 2006 21	Elche	0–2	Valladolid	Elche
				Stadium: Estadio Manuel Martínez Valero

29 January 2006 22	Elche	1–1	Eibar	Elche
				Stadium: Estadio Manuel Martínez Valero

5 February 2006 23	Lorca Deportiva	2–1	Elche	Lorca
				Stadium: Estadio Francisco Artés Carrasco

11 February 2006 24	Elche	0–1	Levante	Elche
				Stadium: Estadio Manuel Martínez Valero

19 February 2006 25	Poli Ejido	2–1	Elche	El Ejido
				Stadium: Santo Domingo

26 February 2006 26	Elche	1–0	Racing Ferrol	Elche
				Stadium: Estadio Manuel Martínez Valero

4 March 2006 27	Lleida	0–0	Elche	Lleida
				Stadium: Camp d'Esports

12 March 2006 28	Murcia	1–0	Elche	Murcia
				Stadium: Estadio de La Condomina

18 March 2006 29	Elche	4–3	Albacete	Elche
				Stadium: Estadio Manuel Martínez Valero

25 March 2006 30	Gimnàstic de Tarragona	1–0	Elche	Tarragona
				Stadium: Nou Estadi

2 April 2006 31	Elche	1–1	Recreativo	Elche
				Stadium: Estadio Manuel Martínez Valero

9 April 2006 32	Málaga B	1–3	Elche	Málaga
				Stadium: La Rosaleda Stadium

15 April 2006 33	Elche	2–1	Real Madrid Castilla	Elche
				Stadium: Estadio Manuel Martínez Valero

23 April 2006 34	Almería	2–0	Elche	Almería
				Stadium: Estadio de los Juegos Mediterráneos

30 April 2006 35	Elche	1–2	Castellón	Elche
				Stadium: Estadio Manuel Martínez Valero

6 May 2006 36	Numancia	3–1	Elche	Soria
				Stadium: Nuevo Estadio Los Pajaritos

14 May 2006 37	Elche	1–0	Xerez	Elche
				Stadium: Estadio Manuel Martínez Valero

20 May 2006 38	Hércules	0–0	Elche	Alicante
				Stadium: Estadio José Rico Pérez

28 May 2006 39	Elche	0–0	Ciudad de Murcia	Elche
				Stadium: Estadio Manuel Martínez Valero; Referee: Mariano Medina Méndez

3 June 2006 40	Tenerife	0–0	Elche	Santa Cruz de Tenerife
				Stadium: Estadio Heliodoro Rodríguez López; Referee: Romualdo Caballero Herreros

10 June 2006 41	Elche	0–0	Sporting Gijón	Elche
				Stadium: Estadio Manuel Martínez Valero; Referee: Juan Antonio Perdigones Pacheco

17 June 2006 42	Valladolid	2–2	Elche	Valladolid
	Antón 70' (pen.); Curbelo 82'		Nino 16'; Niño 35'	Stadium: Estadio José Zorrilla; Referee: Néstor Herráez Prieto

=== Copa del Rey ===
31 August 2005 First round	Recreativo	3–2	Elche	Huelva
