= Diego Domínguez (actor) =

Spanish actor and singer (born 1991)

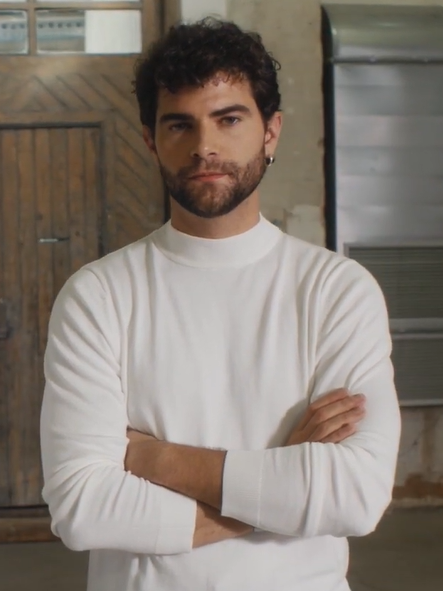
- Domínguez in 2018
- Born: Diego Domínguez Llort; October 13, 1991 (age 34); Boquiñeni, Zaragoza, Spain
- Occupations: Actor, singer
- Years active: 2003–present
- Notable work: Violetta

Diego Domínguez (born 13 October 1991), is a Spanish actor and singer. He is known for playing the character of Diego in the Disney Channel telenovela Violetta.

== Personal life ==
Diego was born in Zaragoza, Spain. His height is 177 cm and his weight is 62 kg. He has 3 tattoos. He dated his Violetta co-star Clara Alonso (who played Angie) from late 2012 to early 2018.

== Filmography ==
Year	Title	Role	Notes
2010	Física o Química	Andrés	Supporting role
2011	El secreto de Puente Viejo	Leandro	Supporting role
2011	Aída	Kevin	Supporting role
2011	La pecera de Eva	Miguel	Supporting role
2011	Familia (shortfilm)	Daniel	Main role
2013–15	Violetta	Diego Hernández	Main role
2017	Perdóname, señor	Dani	
2019–present	Argentina, tierra de amor y venganza	Córdoba	Recurring role
2023	Días de Gallos		
2024	Between Us	Carlos	Main role

== Theater ==
- Nosotros, el musical (2014)

== Discography ==
=== Studio albums ===
- 2004: Girando sin parar
- 2005: Mueve el esqueleto
- 2006: Un sitio ideal

=== Live albums ===
- 2004: 3+2 en concierto
- 2013: Violetta en Vivo

=== Soundtracks ===
- 2005: Trollz: melenas a la moda
- 2013: Hoy somos más
- 2014: Gira mi canción
- 2015: "Crecimos Juntos"
