= Joaquín Bornes =

Spanish football coach and retired player

Personal information
- Full name: Joaquín Bornes Rincón
- Date of birth: 24 March 1975 (age 51)
- Place of birth: Los Palacios y Villafranca, Spain
- Position: Defender

Senior career*
| Years | Team | Apps | (Gls) |
| 1992 | Los Palacios | | |
| 1994–1999 | Recreativo de Huelva | 138 | (0) |
| 1999–2001 | Real Betis | 36 | (0) |
| 2001–2002 | → Recreativo de Huelva (loan) | 10 | (0) |
| 2002–2003 | Elche | 3 | (0) |
| 2004 | Raith Rovers | 13 | (0) |
| 2004–2009 | Ponferradina | 156 | (1) |
| 2009–2010 | Jerez Industrial | 26 | (0) |

Managerial career
- 2016–: Real Betis (youth)
- * Club domestic league appearances and goals

Joaquín Bornes (born 24 March 1975) is a Spanish retired footballer who now works as head coach of Real Betis Juvenil B in his home country.

== Career ==
Bornes started his senior career with Los Palacios C.F.. In 2004, he signed for Raith Rovers in the Scottish Championship, where he made thirteen appearances and scored zero goals. After that, he played for Spanish clubs SD Ponferradina and Jerez Industrial CF before retiring in 2010.
