= Iván Zarandona =

Equatoguinean footballer (born 1980)

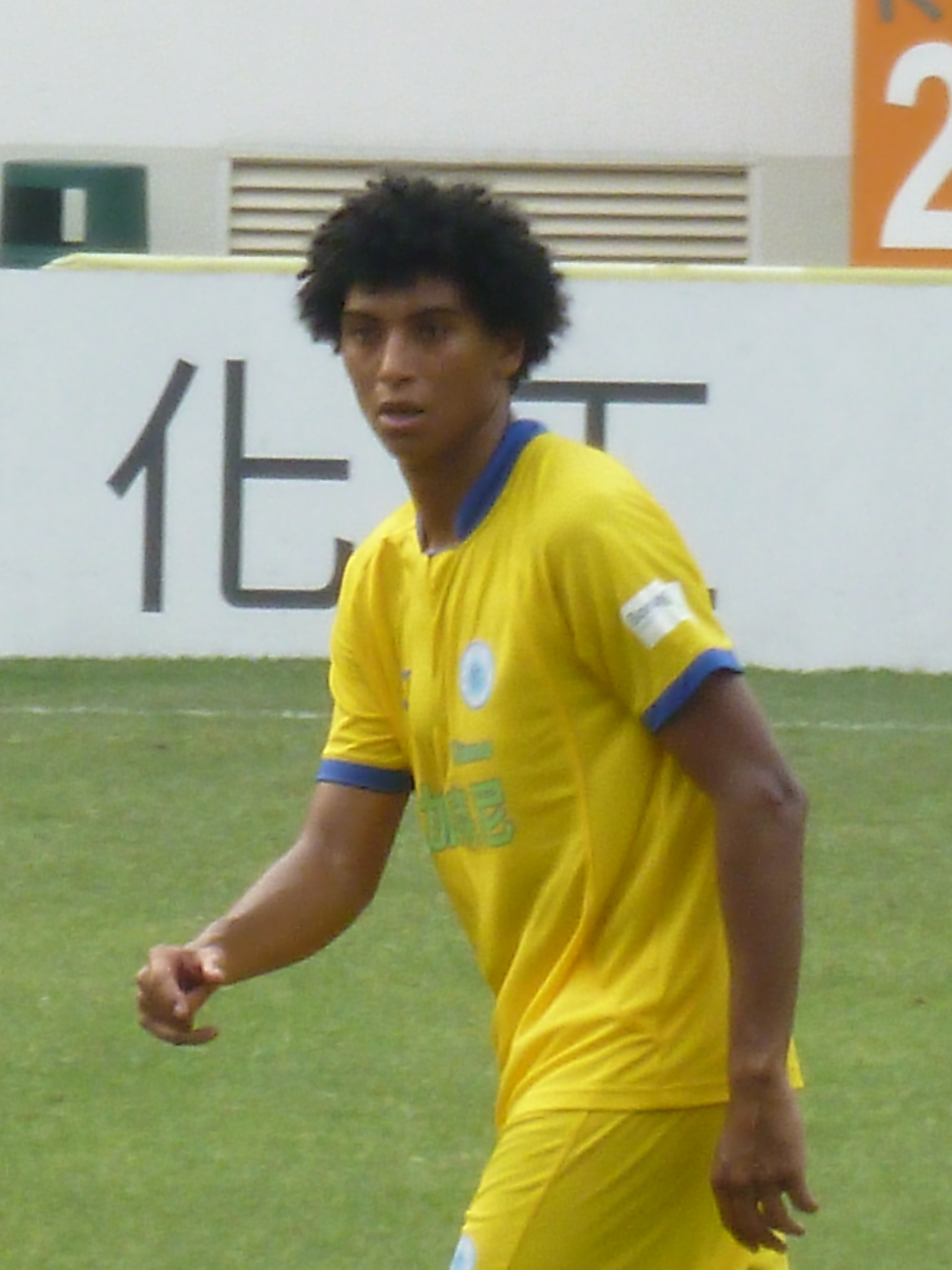
- Zarandona with Hong Kong Rangers in 2014

Personal information
- Full name: Iván Zarandona Esono
- Date of birth: 30 August 1980 (age 46)
- Place of birth: Valladolid, Spain
- Height: 1.86 m (6 ft 1 in)
- Position: Defensive midfielder

Youth career
- 1997–1998: Valladolid
- 1998–1999: Extremadura

Senior career*
Years	Team	Apps	(Gls)
1999–2000	Mallorca B	2	(0)
2000–2001	Ferriolense		
2001–2002	Mallorca B	27	(1)
2002–2003	Betis B	24	(1)
2003–2004	Caravaca		
2004–2005	Valladolid	15	(0)
2005	Rayo Vallecano	9	(2)
2006	Zamora	2	(0)
2006	Murcia B		
2006	Los Palacios		
2007–2008	Pájara Playas	52	(3)
2008–2010	Leganés	60	(4)
2010–2011	Jaén	32	(4)
2011–2012	Lugo	18	(0)
2012–2013	Noja	43	(2)
2014–2015	Hong Kong Rangers	10	(0)
2015–2016	Burgos	26	(1)
2016–2017	Palencia	14	(0)
2017	Atlético Astorga	14	(1)
2017–2019	Tropezón	69	(16)
Total		417+	(35+)

International career
1998	Spain U18	1	(1)
2003–2017	Equatorial Guinea	35	(1)
- * Club domestic league appearances and goals

Iván Zarandona Esono (born 30 August 1980) is a sports agent and former footballer. Mainly a defensive midfielder, he also played as a central defender.

He spent the better part of his career in Spain, representing Valladolid at the professional level.

Born in Spain, Zarandona was a member of the Equatorial Guinea national team.

== Club career ==
Born in Valladolid, Castile and León, Spain, Zarandona spent the vast majority of his career in the lower leagues of that country, having a Segunda División stint with Real Valladolid in the 2004–05 season where he played less than half of the games.

Rarely settling with a club, he also represented CF Extremadura, CD Ferriolense, RCD Mallorca B, Real Betis B, Caravaca CF, Rayo Vallecano, Zamora CF, Real Murcia Imperial, UD Los Palacios, UD Pájara Playas de Jandía, CD Leganés, Real Jaén, CD Lugo, SD Noja and Burgos CF. In the Segunda División B, he totalled 309 matches for several teams.

== International career ==
Zarandona played for the Spain under-18 team but, in June 2003, FIFA allowed him to change his national association. This rule originally applied only for under-21 players not yet capped for senior sides, but FIFA also allowed overage ones to apply until December 2004.

Zarandona started representing his "new nation", Equatorial Guinea, in October 2003, in the 2006 FIFA World Cup qualification first round tie loss against Togo.

== Personal life ==
Zarandona's father was Basque, and his mother was from Equatorial Guinea. His older brother Benjamín successfully represented Valladolid, Real Betis and the Spain under-21 team, before switching to Equatorial Guinea at senior level.

== Career statistics ==
=== Club ===
As of 17 April 2015

Appearances and goals by club, season and competition
Club	Season	League			Cup		Other		Total	
Club	Season	Division	Apps	Goals	Apps	Goals	Apps	Goals	Apps	Goals
Mallorca	2001–02	La Liga	0	0	1	0	—		1	0
Betis B	2002–03	Segunda División B	24	1	—		—		24	1
Valladolid	2004–05	Segunda División	15	0	6	0	—		21	0
Rayo Vallecano	2005–06	Segunda División B	9	2	2	0	—		11	2
Zamora	2005–06	Segunda División B	2	0	0	0	—		2	0
Pájara Playas	2006–07	Segunda División B	19	1	0	0	1 (Note: Appearance in relegation play-offs)	0	20	1
Pájara Playas	2007–08	Segunda División B	33	2	0	0	—		33	2
Pájara Playas	Total		52	2	0	0	1	0	53	3
Leganés	2008–09	Segunda División B	28	3	0	0	2 (Note: Appearances in promotion play-offs)	0	30	3
Leganés	2009–10	Segunda División B	32	1	1	0	—		33	1
Leganés	Total		60	4	1	0	2	0	63	4
Jaén	2010–11	Segunda División B	32	4	1	0	—		33	4
Lugo	2011–12	Segunda División B	18	0	1	0	5	0	24	0
Noja	2012–13	Segunda División B	29	1	2	0	—		31	1
Noja	2013–14	Segunda División B	14	1	0	0	—		14	1
Noja	Total		43	2	2	0	—		45	2
Hong Kong Rangers	2013–14	Hong Kong First Division League	4	0	2	0	—		6	0
Hong Kong Rangers	2014–15	Hong Kong Premier League	6	0	4	0	—		10	0
Hong Kong Rangers	Total		10	0	6	0	—		16	0
Career total			265	16	20	0	8	0	293	16

=== International ===
Score and result list Equatorial Guinea's goal tally first, score column indicates score Zarandona goal.

International goal scored by Iván Zarandona
No.	Date	Venue	Opponent	Score	Result	Competition
1	12 June 2016	Stade de l'Amitié, Cotonou, Benin	Benin	1–1	1–2	2017 Africa Cup of Nations qualification
