= Rosalinda Galán =

Spanish singer and actress (born 1990)

- Galán at the Málaga Film Festival in 2026

Background information
- Born: Rosalinda Galán Parrales; 6 May 1990 (age 36); Los Palacios y Villafranca, Province of Seville, Spain
- Genres: Pasodoble; copla; folk; electronic
- Occupations: Singer; songwriter; actress
- Instrument: Vocals
- Years active: 2020–present
- Website: rosalindagalan.com

Rosalinda Galán Parrales (born 6 May 1990) is a Spanish singer, songwriter and actress. She participated in the Benidorm Fest 2026 with the song "Mataora", finishing in third place.

== Early life ==
Galán was born and raised in Los Palacios y Villafranca, Province of Seville, and started singing at five years old. During adolescence, she developed interests in copla music. Her mother, Rosa Parrales, was in the flamenco music scene.

== Career ==
At 19 years old, Galán moved to Madrid for acting training. In 2016, she acted the lead role in the feature film Zoe, which premiered at the Málaga Film Festival. For her performance in Zoe, she won Best Actress at Islantilla. She also acted in Historias Lamentables (2020), where she worked alongside Spanish director Javier Fesser. Galán performed the role of "María Jiménez" in the theatre production of "Quiero ser María Jiménez".

In 2024, Galán released her debut single "Cállate", which addresses gender-based violence. She released an EP with interpretations of famous copla songs in her style. In the same year, she acted in the Peruvian film Entre Nosotros. She released the song "La Suri" in 2025, which is a tribute to suripantas.

In 2025, Galán was announced as a participant in Benidorm Fest 2026 with the song "Mataora". She placed 3rd in the final with a total of 140 points. In June 2026, she released the song "El Coco" and was an interviewee on RNE's morning show.

== Artistry ==
Galán performs copla with folk and electronic sounds, and has stated her genre to be "electronic pasodoble". She takes influences from her acting training into musical performance. Her music is influenced by her feminist identity and her Andalusian roots.

== Discography ==
=== Singles ===
- "El Coco" (2026)
- "Mataora" (2025)
- "La Suri" (2025)
- "Farsa Monea" (2025)
- "Cu4tro" (2025)
- "Cállate" (2024)

=== EPs ===
- "Grandes Éxitos Vol.1" (2025)

== Filmography ==
=== Film ===
- Zoe (2016)
- Historias Lamentables (2020)
- Entre Nosotros (2024)
