= UD Los Palacios =

Defunct Spanish association football club

Los Palacios
- Full name: Unión Deportiva Los Palacios
- Founded: 1964
- Dissolved: 2011
- Ground: Las Marismas, Los Palacios, Andalusia, Spain
- Capacity: 4,500
- 2010–11: 3ª – Group 10, 11th of 20
Home colours	Away colours

Unión Deportiva Los Palacios is a Spanish football team based in Los Palacios y Villafranca, in the autonomous community of Andalusia. Founded in 1964, and dissolved in 2011, it held home games at Estadio Las Marismas, with a capacity of 4,500 seats. In 2017, the club was reformed as Los Palacios CF and currently plays in the 7th tier.

The team was dissolved on 23 June 2011 due to economic problems.

== Season to season ==
Season	Tier	Division	Place	Copa del Rey
1964–1968	—	Regional	—	
1968–69	4	1ª Reg.	10th	
1969–70	5	2ª Reg.		
1970–71	5	2ª Reg.		
1971–72	5	2ª Reg.	10th	
1972–73	5	2ª Reg.	8th	
1973–74	5	2ª Reg.	14th	
1974–75	5	2ª Reg.	3rd	
1975–76	6	2ª Reg.		
1976–77	6	2ª Reg.		
1977–78	7	2ª Reg.		
1978–79	6	1ª Reg.	16th	
1979–80	6	1ª Reg.	9th	
1980–81	6	1ª Reg.	4th	
1981–82	6	1ª Reg.	4th	
1982–83	6	1ª Reg.	1st	
1983–84	5	Reg. Pref.	10th	
1984–85	5	Reg. Pref.	6th	
1985–86	5	Reg. Pref.	11th	
1986–87	5	Reg. Pref.	5th	

Season	Tier	Division	Place	Copa del Rey
1987–88	5	Reg. Pref.	6th	
1988–89	5	Reg. Pref.	6th	
1989–90	5	Reg. Pref.	3rd	
1990–91	5	Reg. Pref.	1st	
1991–92	4	3ª	9th	
1992–93	4	3ª	6th	
1993–94	4	3ª	2nd	First round
1994–95	4	3ª	7th	
1995–96	4	3ª	12th	
1996–97	4	3ª	6th	
1997–98	4	3ª	17th	
1998–99	4	3ª	11th	
1999–2000	4	3ª	5th	
2000–01	4	3ª	9th	
2001–02	4	3ª	13th	
2002–03	4	3ª	2nd	
2003–04	3	2ª B	20th	
2004–05	4	3ª	5th	
2005–06	4	3ª	12th	
2006–07	4	3ª	6th	

Season	Tier	Division	Place	Copa del Rey
2007–08	4	3ª	7th	
2008–09	4	3ª	14th	
2009–10	4	3ª	11th	
2010–11	4	3ª	11th	

- 1 season in Segunda División B
- 19 seasons in Tercera División

== Famous players ==
- (Equatorial Guinea) (Spain) Iván Zarandona
- (Spain) Jesús Navas
- (Spain) Marco Navas
- (Spain) Antoñito
