= 2010–11 Tercera División =

Fourth tier of football in Spain

Tercera División
- Season: 2010–11
- Promoted: Marino de Luanco; Villanovense; Valencia Mestalla; Burgos; Amorebieta; Toledo; Llagostera; Andorra; Linense; Reus Deportiu; Olímpic Xàtiva; Manacor; Sp. Villanueva; Arandina; S.S. Reyes; Sestao River; Gimn. Segoviana; La Roda

The 2010–11 Tercera División was the fourth tier of football in Spain. Play started on 27 August 2010 and the season ended on 26 June 2011 with the promotion play-off finals.

== Overview ==
There were 360 clubs competing in Tercera División (Third division) in the 2010–11 season, divided into 18 regional groups, accommodating between 19 and 21 clubs.

The following clubs finished as champions of their respective groups

- Grupo I (Galicia) - Cerceda
- Grupo II (Asturias) - Marino
- Grupo III (Cantabria) - Noja
- Grupo IV (País Vasco) - Amorebieta
- Grupo V (Cataluña) - Llagostera
- Grupo VI (Comunidad Valenciana) - Valencia Mestalla
- Grupo VII (Comunidad de Madrid) - Alcobendas Sport
- Grupo VIII (Castilla & León) - Burgos
- Grupo IX (Andalucía Oriental (Almería, Granada, Jaén & Málaga) & Melilla) - Comarca de Níjar
- Grupo X (Andalucía Occidental (Cádiz, Córdoba, Huelva & Sevilla) & Ceuta) - Linense
- Grupo XI (Islas Baleares) - Manacor
- Grupo XII (Canarias) - Lanzarote
- Grupo XIII (Región de Murcia) - Costa Cálida
- Grupo XIV (Extremadura) - Villanovense
- Grupo XV (Navarra) - Tudelano
- Grupo XVI (La Rioja) - Náxara
- Grupo XVII (Aragón) - Andorra
- Grupo XVIII (Castilla-La Mancha) - Toledo

The 18 group champion clubs participated in the Group winners promotion play-off and the losers from these 9 play-off ties then proceeded to the Non-champions promotion play-off with clubs finishing second third and fourth.

== League standings ==
=== Group I - Galicia ===
| Pos | Team | Pld | W | D | L | GF | GA | GD | Pts |
|---|---|---|---|---|---|---|---|---|---|
| 1 | Cerceda (C) | 36 | 26 | 5 | 5 | 57 | 17 | +40 | 83 |
| 2 | Racing de Ferrol | 36 | 22 | 7 | 7 | 79 | 29 | +50 | 73 |
| 3 | Ourense | 36 | 21 | 4 | 11 | 71 | 31 | +40 | 67 |
| 4 | Racing Villalbés | 36 | 17 | 12 | 7 | 39 | 25 | +14 | 63 |
| 5 | Somozas | 36 | 16 | 12 | 8 | 49 | 32 | +17 | 60 |
| 6 | Alondras | 36 | 14 | 13 | 9 | 47 | 38 | +9 | 55 |
| 7 | Órdenes | 36 | 15 | 10 | 11 | 42 | 45 | −3 | 55 |
| 8 | Negreira | 36 | 14 | 9 | 13 | 41 | 35 | +6 | 51 |
| 9 | Villalonga | 36 | 12 | 13 | 11 | 42 | 45 | −3 | 49 |
| 10 | Rápido Bouzas | 36 | 13 | 5 | 18 | 43 | 51 | −8 | 44 |
| 11 | As Pontes | 36 | 11 | 11 | 14 | 41 | 53 | −12 | 44 |
| 12 | Estradense | 36 | 11 | 11 | 14 | 37 | 41 | −4 | 44 |
| 13 | Mesón do Bento (Note: Mesón do Bento resigned from Tercera División at the end of the season and thus relegated to Preferente Autonómica, so Cultural Areas was re-admitted to Tercera División.) (R) | 36 | 7 | 19 | 10 | 36 | 47 | −11 | 40 |
| 14 | Bergantiños | 36 | 10 | 10 | 16 | 33 | 45 | −12 | 40 |
| 15 | Cultural Areas | 36 | 9 | 12 | 15 | 40 | 55 | −15 | 39 |
| 16 | Pontevedra B (Note: Due to Pontevedra's relegation from Segunda División B to this group, the reserve team, Pontevedra B, was forced to relegate to Primeira Autonómica.) (R) | 36 | 9 | 10 | 17 | 30 | 46 | −16 | 37 |
| 17 | Santa Comba (R) | 36 | 8 | 11 | 17 | 30 | 52 | −22 | 35 |
| 18 | Narón (R) | 36 | 8 | 7 | 21 | 33 | 56 | −23 | 31 |
| 19 | Portonovo (R) | 36 | 5 | 7 | 24 | 23 | 71 | −48 | 22 |

(C) Champions; (R) Relegated

=== Group II - Asturias ===
| Pos | Team | Pld | W | D | L | GF | GA | GD | Pts |
|---|---|---|---|---|---|---|---|---|---|
| 1 | Marino (C, P) | 38 | 25 | 9 | 4 | 79 | 30 | +49 | 84 |
| 2 | Univ. Oviedo | 38 | 23 | 10 | 5 | 73 | 31 | +42 | 79 |
| 3 | Langreo | 38 | 24 | 5 | 9 | 67 | 30 | +37 | 77 |
| 4 | Tuilla | 38 | 23 | 6 | 9 | 83 | 50 | +33 | 75 |
| 5 | Candás | 38 | 19 | 12 | 7 | 60 | 38 | +22 | 69 |
| 6 | Condal | 38 | 17 | 10 | 11 | 57 | 42 | +15 | 61 |
| 7 | Navia | 38 | 16 | 12 | 10 | 60 | 50 | +10 | 60 |
| 8 | Oviedo Vetusta | 38 | 16 | 10 | 12 | 77 | 53 | +24 | 58 |
| 9 | Navarro | 38 | 16 | 7 | 15 | 44 | 54 | −10 | 55 |
| 10 | Real Avilés | 38 | 14 | 13 | 11 | 40 | 38 | +2 | 55 |
| 11 | Cudillero | 38 | 11 | 10 | 17 | 39 | 54 | −15 | 43 |
| 12 | Lealtad | 38 | 10 | 11 | 17 | 40 | 49 | −9 | 41 |
| 13 | Luarca | 38 | 9 | 14 | 15 | 38 | 53 | −15 | 41 |
| 14 | Llanes | 38 | 10 | 11 | 17 | 54 | 72 | −18 | 41 |
| 15 | Ceares | 38 | 10 | 9 | 19 | 39 | 56 | −17 | 39 |
| 16 | Nalón | 39 | 9 | 11 | 19 | 60 | 83 | −23 | 38 |
| 17 | Gijón Ind. | 38 | 9 | 10 | 19 | 34 | 50 | −16 | 37 |
| 18 | Andés (R) | 38 | 9 | 10 | 19 | 35 | 68 | −33 | 37 |
| 19 | Ribadesella (R) | 37 | 8 | 8 | 21 | 36 | 75 | −39 | 32 |
| 20 | Praviano (R) | 38 | 5 | 6 | 27 | 34 | 72 | −38 | 21 |

(C) Champions; (P) Promoted; (R) Relegated

=== Group III - Cantabria ===
| Pos | Team | Pld | W | D | L | GF | GA | GD | Pts |
|---|---|---|---|---|---|---|---|---|---|
| 1 | Noja (C) | 38 | 25 | 7 | 6 | 58 | 26 | +32 | 82 |
| 2 | Rayo Cantabria | 38 | 22 | 13 | 3 | 81 | 30 | +51 | 79 |
| 3 | Racing B | 38 | 23 | 9 | 6 | 78 | 28 | +50 | 78 |
| 4 | Siete Villas | 38 | 21 | 8 | 9 | 63 | 37 | +26 | 71 |
| 5 | Bezana | 38 | 20 | 10 | 8 | 55 | 35 | +20 | 70 |
| 6 | Escobedo | 38 | 18 | 11 | 9 | 81 | 49 | +32 | 65 |
| 7 | Tropezón | 38 | 18 | 10 | 10 | 67 | 42 | +25 | 64 |
| 8 | Ribamontán | 38 | 18 | 8 | 12 | 54 | 51 | +3 | 62 |
| 9 | Buelna | 38 | 18 | 8 | 12 | 42 | 40 | +2 | 62 |
| 10 | Cayón | 38 | 15 | 8 | 15 | 56 | 48 | +8 | 53 |
| 11 | Laredo | 38 | 13 | 12 | 13 | 40 | 41 | −1 | 51 |
| 12 | Pontejos | 38 | 13 | 8 | 17 | 46 | 54 | −8 | 47 |
| 13 | Cultural Guarnizo | 38 | 12 | 9 | 17 | 47 | 59 | −12 | 45 |
| 14 | Arenas de Frajanas | 38 | 13 | 6 | 19 | 51 | 78 | −27 | 45 |
| 15 | Atl. Albericia | 38 | 10 | 10 | 18 | 40 | 60 | −20 | 40 |
| 16 | Vimenor | 38 | 9 | 11 | 18 | 36 | 52 | −16 | 38 |
| 17 | Castro | 38 | 9 | 11 | 18 | 50 | 62 | −12 | 38 |
| 18 | Solares (R) | 38 | 9 | 7 | 22 | 30 | 62 | −32 | 34 |
| 19 | Santoña (R) | 38 | 6 | 6 | 26 | 32 | 77 | −45 | 24 |
| 20 | Reocín (Note: Team withdrawn from the competition and consequently relegated to Regional Preferente) (R) | 38 | 1 | 2 | 35 | 6 | 81 | −75 | 5 |

(C) Champions; (R) Relegated

=== Group IV - Basque Country ===
| Pos | Team | Pld | W | D | L | GF | GA | GD | Pts |
|---|---|---|---|---|---|---|---|---|---|
| 1 | Amorebieta (C, P) | 38 | 25 | 6 | 7 | 71 | 26 | +45 | 81 |
| 2 | Laudio | 38 | 21 | 13 | 4 | 62 | 34 | +28 | 76 |
| 3 | Sestao River (P) | 38 | 22 | 8 | 8 | 55 | 27 | +28 | 74 |
| 4 | Durango | 38 | 20 | 8 | 10 | 51 | 33 | +18 | 68 |
| 5 | Beasain | 38 | 16 | 14 | 8 | 49 | 32 | +17 | 62 |
| 6 | Portugalete | 38 | 16 | 10 | 12 | 57 | 34 | +23 | 58 |
| 7 | Arenas de Getxo | 38 | 15 | 11 | 12 | 26 | 23 | +3 | 56 |
| 8 | Baskonia | 38 | 15 | 11 | 12 | 54 | 42 | +12 | 56 |
| 9 | Leioa | 38 | 14 | 13 | 11 | 40 | 38 | +2 | 55 |
| 10 | Lagun Onak | 38 | 13 | 12 | 13 | 39 | 32 | +7 | 51 |
| 11 | Santutxu | 38 | 13 | 7 | 18 | 34 | 43 | −9 | 46 |
| 12 | Zalla | 38 | 12 | 9 | 17 | 30 | 53 | −23 | 45 |
| 13 | Zarautz | 38 | 11 | 10 | 17 | 34 | 53 | −19 | 43 |
| 14 | Gernika | 38 | 10 | 13 | 15 | 36 | 37 | −1 | 43 |
| 15 | Zamudio | 38 | 10 | 12 | 16 | 32 | 50 | −18 | 42 |
| 16 | Eibar B | 38 | 11 | 8 | 19 | 30 | 48 | −18 | 41 |
| 17 | Elgoibar | 38 | 10 | 9 | 19 | 33 | 50 | −17 | 39 |
| 18 | Santurtzi (R) | 38 | 8 | 14 | 16 | 28 | 42 | −14 | 38 |
| 19 | Amurrio (R) | 38 | 7 | 11 | 20 | 29 | 55 | −26 | 32 |
| 20 | Aurrerá de Vitoria (R) | 38 | 8 | 7 | 23 | 27 | 63 | −36 | 31 |

(C) Champions; (P) Promoted; (R) Relegated

=== Group V - Catalonia ===
| Pos | Team | Pld | W | D | L | GF | GA | GD | Pts |
|---|---|---|---|---|---|---|---|---|---|
| 1 | Llagostera (C, P) | 38 | 22 | 7 | 9 | 65 | 36 | +29 | 73 |
| 2 | Montañesa | 38 | 19 | 10 | 9 | 40 | 33 | +7 | 67 |
| 3 | Pobla Mafumet | 38 | 19 | 10 | 9 | 60 | 36 | +24 | 67 |
| 4 | Reus Deportiu (P) | 38 | 17 | 14 | 7 | 52 | 26 | +26 | 65 |
| 5 | Espanyol B | 38 | 19 | 7 | 12 | 65 | 38 | +27 | 64 |
| 6 | Manlleu | 38 | 14 | 19 | 5 | 58 | 40 | +18 | 61 |
| 7 | Europa | 38 | 16 | 10 | 12 | 54 | 42 | +12 | 58 |
| 8 | Cornellà | 38 | 15 | 10 | 13 | 58 | 44 | +14 | 55 |
| 9 | Prat | 38 | 13 | 14 | 11 | 49 | 42 | +7 | 53 |
| 10 | Gavà | 38 | 13 | 13 | 12 | 42 | 45 | −3 | 52 |
| 11 | Vilafranca | 38 | 13 | 10 | 15 | 48 | 55 | −7 | 49 |
| 12 | Terrassa | 38 | 11 | 14 | 13 | 58 | 53 | +5 | 47 |
| 13 | Castelldefels | 38 | 12 | 11 | 15 | 37 | 45 | −8 | 47 |
| 14 | Amposta | 38 | 13 | 6 | 19 | 45 | 65 | −20 | 45 |
| 15 | Balaguer | 38 | 11 | 10 | 17 | 42 | 60 | −18 | 43 |
| 16 | Masnou | 38 | 10 | 11 | 17 | 51 | 60 | −9 | 41 |
| 17 | Vilanova | 38 | 8 | 17 | 13 | 42 | 51 | −9 | 41 |
| 18 | Palamós (R) | 38 | 9 | 14 | 15 | 35 | 45 | −10 | 41 |
| 19 | Ascó (R) | 38 | 6 | 11 | 21 | 29 | 72 | −43 | 29 |
| 20 | Premià (R) | 38 | 5 | 12 | 21 | 24 | 66 | −42 | 27 |

(C) Champions; (P) Promoted; (R) Relegated

=== Group VI - Valencian Community ===
| Pos | Team | Pld | W | D | L | GF | GA | GD | Pts |
|---|---|---|---|---|---|---|---|---|---|
| 1 | Valencia Mestalla (C, P) | 38 | 25 | 11 | 2 | 82 | 28 | +54 | 86 |
| 2 | Olímpic Xàtiva (P) | 38 | 21 | 10 | 7 | 52 | 29 | +23 | 73 |
| 3 | Novelda | 38 | 20 | 8 | 10 | 62 | 46 | +16 | 68 |
| 4 | La Nucía | 38 | 18 | 12 | 8 | 48 | 35 | +13 | 66 |
| 5 | Borriol | 38 | 19 | 9 | 10 | 61 | 35 | +26 | 66 |
| 6 | Villarreal C | 38 | 19 | 7 | 12 | 75 | 53 | +22 | 64 |
| 7 | Crevillente | 38 | 15 | 9 | 14 | 43 | 43 | 0 | 54 |
| 8 | Catarroja | 38 | 13 | 11 | 14 | 35 | 32 | +3 | 50 |
| 9 | Torrellano (Note: Torrellano amalgamated with Huracán Valencia and promoted to Segunda División B after buying the vacant place left by the administrative relegation of Alicante to Tercera División) (P) | 38 | 14 | 8 | 16 | 52 | 44 | +8 | 50 |
| 10 | J.B. Cristo | 38 | 12 | 11 | 15 | 39 | 43 | −4 | 47 |
| 11 | Atl. Saguntino | 38 | 13 | 7 | 18 | 41 | 53 | −12 | 46 |
| 12 | Mislata | 38 | 12 | 10 | 16 | 37 | 52 | −15 | 46 |
| 13 | Jove Español | 38 | 11 | 12 | 15 | 44 | 47 | −3 | 45 |
| 14 | Eldense | 38 | 12 | 9 | 17 | 31 | 39 | −8 | 45 |
| 15 | Ribarroja | 38 | 11 | 12 | 15 | 34 | 54 | −20 | 45 |
| 16 | Torrevieja | 38 | 12 | 7 | 19 | 31 | 42 | −11 | 43 |
| 17 | Levante B | 38 | 11 | 10 | 17 | 30 | 47 | −17 | 43 |
| 18 | Burjassot (R) | 38 | 10 | 10 | 18 | 41 | 52 | −11 | 40 |
| 19 | Villajoyosa (R) | 38 | 9 | 10 | 19 | 36 | 59 | −23 | 37 |
| 20 | Puçol (R) | 38 | 7 | 9 | 22 | 33 | 75 | −42 | 30 |

(C) Champions; (P) Promoted; (R) Relegated

=== Group VII - Community of Madrid ===
| Pos | Team | Pld | W | D | L | GF | GA | GD | Pts |
|---|---|---|---|---|---|---|---|---|---|
| 1 | Alcobendas Sport (C) | 38 | 22 | 9 | 7 | 71 | 33 | +38 | 75 |
| 2 | Pozuelo Alarcón | 38 | 18 | 11 | 9 | 52 | 44 | +8 | 65 |
| 3 | Villaviciosa Odón | 38 | 17 | 12 | 9 | 43 | 30 | +13 | 63 |
| 4 | S.S. Reyes (P) | 38 | 17 | 12 | 9 | 57 | 36 | +21 | 63 |
| 5 | Real Madrid C | 38 | 17 | 10 | 11 | 54 | 37 | +17 | 61 |
| 6 | Internacional | 38 | 16 | 12 | 10 | 44 | 34 | +10 | 60 |
| 7 | Atl. Pinto | 38 | 16 | 8 | 14 | 47 | 47 | 0 | 56 |
| 8 | Fuenlabrada | 38 | 15 | 11 | 12 | 54 | 40 | +14 | 56 |
| 9 | Móstoles | 38 | 15 | 9 | 14 | 55 | 46 | +9 | 54 |
| 10 | Rayo Majadahonda | 38 | 16 | 6 | 16 | 61 | 54 | +7 | 54 |
| 11 | Colmenar Viejo | 38 | 16 | 6 | 16 | 62 | 63 | −1 | 54 |
| 12 | Puerta Bonita | 38 | 15 | 9 | 14 | 54 | 59 | −5 | 54 |
| 13 | Trival Valderas | 38 | 14 | 11 | 13 | 55 | 50 | +5 | 53 |
| 14 | Parla | 38 | 15 | 6 | 17 | 44 | 53 | −9 | 51 |
| 15 | Atlético C | 38 | 12 | 14 | 12 | 52 | 52 | 0 | 50 |
| 16 | Navalcarnero | 38 | 13 | 10 | 15 | 44 | 46 | −2 | 49 |
| 17 | S. Fernando Henares (R) | 38 | 13 | 8 | 17 | 45 | 49 | −4 | 47 |
| 18 | Vallecas (R) | 38 | 9 | 9 | 20 | 43 | 72 | −29 | 36 |
| 19 | Las Rozas (R) | 38 | 5 | 9 | 24 | 42 | 79 | −37 | 24 |
| 20 | Coslada (R) | 38 | 5 | 6 | 27 | 27 | 81 | −54 | 21 |

(C) Champions; (P) Promoted; (R) Relegated

=== Group VIII - Castilla and León ===
| Pos | Team | Pld | W | D | L | GF | GA | GD | Pts |
|---|---|---|---|---|---|---|---|---|---|
| 1 | Burgos (C, P) | 38 | 25 | 9 | 4 | 75 | 23 | +52 | 84 |
| 2 | Villaralbo | 38 | 25 | 8 | 5 | 83 | 36 | +47 | 83 |
| 3 | Gimn. Segoviana (P) | 38 | 24 | 9 | 5 | 68 | 26 | +42 | 81 |
| 4 | Arandina (P) | 38 | 23 | 9 | 6 | 61 | 26 | +35 | 78 |
| 5 | Valladolid B | 38 | 20 | 9 | 9 | 67 | 25 | +42 | 69 |
| 6 | Almazán | 38 | 14 | 13 | 11 | 55 | 51 | +4 | 55 |
| 7 | Ávila | 38 | 14 | 13 | 11 | 48 | 44 | +4 | 55 |
| 8 | Íscar | 38 | 15 | 8 | 15 | 48 | 62 | −14 | 53 |
| 9 | Numancia B | 38 | 14 | 11 | 13 | 58 | 49 | +9 | 53 |
| 10 | Bembibre | 38 | 15 | 7 | 16 | 56 | 46 | +10 | 52 |
| 11 | Huracán Z | 38 | 13 | 12 | 13 | 30 | 37 | −7 | 51 |
| 12 | Atl. Astorga | 38 | 12 | 14 | 12 | 39 | 46 | −7 | 50 |
| 13 | Aguilar | 38 | 13 | 9 | 16 | 41 | 60 | −19 | 48 |
| 14 | Ponferradina B | 38 | 11 | 9 | 18 | 45 | 49 | −4 | 42 |
| 15 | Cristo Atl. | 38 | 9 | 11 | 18 | 27 | 43 | −16 | 38 |
| 16 | Tordesillas | 38 | 9 | 8 | 21 | 33 | 65 | −32 | 35 |
| 17 | Lermeño | 38 | 7 | 11 | 20 | 29 | 59 | −30 | 32 |
| 18 | Cultural Cebrereña (R) | 38 | 8 | 6 | 24 | 42 | 92 | −50 | 30 |
| 19 | Santa Marta (R) | 38 | 6 | 11 | 21 | 36 | 68 | −32 | 29 |
| 20 | Venta de Baños (R) | 38 | 6 | 7 | 25 | 30 | 64 | −34 | 25 |

(C) Champions; (P) Promoted; (R) Relegated

=== Group IX - Eastern Andalusia and Melilla ===
| Pos | Team | Pld | W | D | L | GF | GA | GD | Pts |
|---|---|---|---|---|---|---|---|---|---|
| 1 | Comarca de Níjar (C) | 38 | 23 | 10 | 5 | 57 | 29 | +28 | 79 |
| 2 | Alhaurín de la Torre | 38 | 22 | 12 | 4 | 58 | 23 | +35 | 78 |
| 3 | Loja | 38 | 21 | 11 | 6 | 61 | 35 | +26 | 74 |
| 4 | Atl. Malagueño | 37 | 20 | 10 | 7 | 63 | 35 | +28 | 70 |
| 5 | Ronda | 38 | 19 | 11 | 8 | 68 | 37 | +31 | 68 |
| 6 | Maracena | 38 | 17 | 12 | 9 | 51 | 38 | +13 | 63 |
| 7 | Antequera | 38 | 18 | 8 | 12 | 72 | 47 | +25 | 62 |
| 8 | Motril | 38 | 15 | 13 | 10 | 50 | 33 | +17 | 58 |
| 9 | Martos | 38 | 14 | 11 | 13 | 38 | 40 | −2 | 53 |
| 10 | Marbella | 38 | 15 | 8 | 15 | 55 | 47 | +8 | 53 |
| 11 | At. Mancha Real | 38 | 11 | 16 | 11 | 49 | 42 | +7 | 49 |
| 12 | Huétor Tájar | 38 | 12 | 10 | 16 | 37 | 51 | −14 | 46 |
| 13 | El Palo | 38 | 13 | 7 | 18 | 57 | 64 | −7 | 46 |
| 14 | Ciudad Vícar | 38 | 11 | 12 | 15 | 46 | 55 | −9 | 45 |
| 15 | Vélez | 38 | 11 | 11 | 16 | 56 | 57 | −1 | 44 |
| 16 | Carboneras | 38 | 10 | 10 | 18 | 57 | 71 | −14 | 40 |
| 17 | Casino del Real | 38 | 8 | 13 | 17 | 41 | 68 | −27 | 37 |
| 18 | Baza (R) | 38 | 8 | 10 | 20 | 29 | 59 | −30 | 34 |
| 19 | Alhaurino (R) | 38 | 7 | 9 | 22 | 38 | 58 | −20 | 30 |
| 20 | Adra (Note: Team withdrawn from the competition and consequently relegated to 1ª Andaluza) (R) | 38 | 0 | 6 | 32 | 13 | 106 | −93 | 6 |

(C) Champions; (R) Relegated

=== Group X - Western Andalusia and Ceuta ===
| Pos | Team | Pld | W | D | L | GF | GA | GD | Pts |
|---|---|---|---|---|---|---|---|---|---|
| 1 | Linense (C, P) | 38 | 22 | 10 | 6 | 65 | 32 | +33 | 76 |
| 2 | San Fernando | 38 | 21 | 9 | 8 | 61 | 33 | +28 | 72 |
| 3 | Pozoblanco | 38 | 20 | 11 | 7 | 58 | 33 | +25 | 71 |
| 4 | Mairena | 38 | 17 | 12 | 9 | 40 | 29 | +11 | 63 |
| 5 | Algeciras | 38 | 17 | 11 | 10 | 44 | 33 | +11 | 62 |
| 6 | Portuense | 38 | 17 | 10 | 11 | 44 | 40 | +4 | 61 |
| 7 | Puerto Real (Note: Puerto Real was dissolved after the end of the season.) (D) | 38 | 14 | 17 | 7 | 42 | 32 | +10 | 59 |
| 8 | Atl. Sanluqueño | 38 | 14 | 14 | 10 | 47 | 42 | +5 | 56 |
| 9 | Sevilla C | 38 | 12 | 15 | 11 | 42 | 40 | +2 | 51 |
| 10 | Córdoba B | 38 | 13 | 10 | 15 | 41 | 38 | +3 | 49 |
| 11 | Los Palacios (Note: Los Palacios was dissolved after the end of the season.) (D) | 38 | 12 | 13 | 13 | 40 | 44 | −4 | 49 |
| 12 | Coria | 38 | 12 | 10 | 16 | 58 | 60 | −2 | 46 |
| 13 | Recreativo B | 38 | 10 | 14 | 14 | 41 | 47 | −6 | 44 |
| 14 | Conil | 38 | 11 | 10 | 17 | 44 | 47 | −3 | 43 |
| 15 | Cádiz B | 38 | 12 | 7 | 19 | 52 | 50 | +2 | 43 |
| 16 | Marinaleda | 38 | 11 | 9 | 18 | 36 | 53 | −17 | 42 |
| 17 | Ayamonte | 38 | 9 | 15 | 14 | 53 | 62 | −9 | 42 |
| 18 | Jerez Industrial (R) | 38 | 13 | 6 | 19 | 36 | 60 | −24 | 42 (Note: Jerez Industrial was docked 3 points due to their illegal line-up against Pozoblanco.) |
| 19 | Peñarroya (R) | 38 | 8 | 10 | 20 | 35 | 60 | −25 | 34 |
| 20 | Los Barrios (R) | 38 | 3 | 11 | 24 | 23 | 68 | −45 | 20 |

(C) Champions; (D) Dissolved; (P) Promoted; (R) Relegated

=== Group XI - Balearic Islands ===
| Pos | Team | Pld | W | D | L | GF | GA | GD | Pts |
|---|---|---|---|---|---|---|---|---|---|
| 1 | Manacor (C, P) | 38 | 23 | 10 | 5 | 51 | 23 | +28 | 79 |
| 2 | Poblense | 38 | 24 | 6 | 8 | 71 | 44 | +27 | 78 |
| 3 | Constancia | 38 | 23 | 9 | 6 | 62 | 25 | +37 | 78 |
| 4 | Binissalem | 38 | 22 | 10 | 6 | 63 | 30 | +33 | 76 |
| 5 | Llosetense | 38 | 23 | 6 | 9 | 70 | 44 | +26 | 75 |
| 6 | Santa Eulàlia | 38 | 19 | 12 | 7 | 53 | 25 | +28 | 69 |
| 7 | Santanyí | 38 | 18 | 9 | 11 | 53 | 43 | +10 | 63 |
| 8 | Sant Rafel | 38 | 12 | 18 | 8 | 47 | 36 | +11 | 54 |
| 9 | Mercadal | 38 | 14 | 10 | 14 | 55 | 45 | +10 | 52 |
| 10 | Collerense | 38 | 12 | 11 | 15 | 40 | 49 | −9 | 47 |
| 11 | Montuïri | 38 | 13 | 7 | 18 | 46 | 58 | −12 | 46 |
| 12 | Ferriolense | 38 | 12 | 8 | 18 | 48 | 55 | −7 | 44 |
| 13 | Campos | 38 | 10 | 14 | 14 | 43 | 52 | −9 | 44 |
| 14 | Alcúdia | 38 | 11 | 10 | 17 | 43 | 61 | −18 | 43 |
| 15 | Felanitx | 38 | 11 | 9 | 18 | 36 | 56 | −20 | 42 |
| 16 | Ferreries | 38 | 10 | 11 | 17 | 41 | 51 | −10 | 41 |
| 17 | Alaior | 38 | 10 | 8 | 20 | 35 | 61 | −26 | 38 |
| 18 | Penya Arrabal (R) | 38 | 8 | 3 | 27 | 45 | 78 | −33 | 27 |
| 19 | Norteño (R) | 38 | 7 | 6 | 25 | 24 | 56 | −32 | 27 |
| 20 | Arenal (R) | 38 | 6 | 7 | 25 | 32 | 66 | −34 | 25 |

(C) Champions; (P) Promoted; (R) Relegated

=== Group XII - Canary Islands ===
| Pos | Team | Pld | W | D | L | GF | GA | GD | Pts |
|---|---|---|---|---|---|---|---|---|---|
| 1 | Lanzarote (C) | 40 | 23 | 10 | 7 | 65 | 30 | +35 | 79 |
| 2 | Las Palmas At. | 40 | 23 | 9 | 8 | 68 | 43 | +25 | 78 |
| 3 | Tenerife B | 40 | 21 | 9 | 10 | 64 | 34 | +30 | 72 |
| 4 | Granadilla | 40 | 19 | 14 | 7 | 48 | 29 | +19 | 71 |
| 5 | Villa Sta. Brígida | 40 | 17 | 12 | 11 | 62 | 47 | +15 | 63 |
| 6 | Marino | 40 | 17 | 11 | 12 | 52 | 38 | +14 | 62 |
| 7 | Corralejo | 40 | 16 | 14 | 10 | 52 | 39 | +13 | 62 |
| 8 | Pájara Playas (Note: Pájara Playas resigned from Tercera División at the end of the season and thus relegated to Preferente.) (R) | 40 | 17 | 6 | 17 | 54 | 59 | −5 | 57 |
| 9 | Tenisca | 40 | 17 | 6 | 17 | 48 | 58 | −10 | 57 |
| 10 | Tijarafe | 40 | 16 | 8 | 16 | 54 | 49 | +5 | 56 |
| 11 | Vera | 40 | 15 | 11 | 14 | 63 | 60 | +3 | 56 |
| 12 | Laguna | 40 | 15 | 6 | 19 | 47 | 48 | −1 | 51 |
| 13 | Mensajero | 40 | 14 | 8 | 18 | 62 | 62 | 0 | 50 |
| 14 | Huracán (Note: Huracán resigned from Tercera División at the end of the season and thus relegated to Preferente.) (R) | 40 | 12 | 13 | 15 | 45 | 59 | −14 | 49 |
| 15 | Teror (Note: Teror resigned from Tercera División at the end of the season and relegated directly to Preferente.) (R) | 40 | 12 | 13 | 15 | 54 | 60 | −6 | 49 |
| 16 | Las Zocas | 38 | 12 | 10 | 16 | 42 | 50 | −8 | 46 |
| 17 | Victoria (Note: Victoria resigned from Tercera División at the end of the season and thus relegated to Preferente.) (R) | 40 | 14 | 4 | 22 | 36 | 58 | −22 | 46 |
| 18 | Or. Marítima (R) | 40 | 10 | 15 | 15 | 45 | 59 | −14 | 45 |
| 19 | San Isidro (R) | 40 | 12 | 8 | 20 | 44 | 69 | −25 | 44 |
| 20 | Guía (R) | 40 | 11 | 9 | 20 | 37 | 47 | −10 | 42 |
| 21 | Realejos (R) | 40 | 6 | 5 | 29 | 40 | 84 | −44 | 23 |

(C) Champions; (R) Relegated

=== Group XIII - Region of Murcia ===
| Pos | Team | Pld | W | D | L | GF | GA | GD | Pts |
|---|---|---|---|---|---|---|---|---|---|
| 1 | Costa Cálida (Note: Costa Cálida changed to UCAM Murcia after the end of the season) (C) | 38 | 27 | 5 | 6 | 81 | 22 | +59 | 86 |
| 2 | Real Murcia B | 38 | 25 | 9 | 4 | 69 | 18 | +51 | 84 |
| 3 | Mar Menor | 38 | 25 | 8 | 5 | 83 | 28 | +55 | 83 |
| 4 | Cartagena La Unión (Note: Cartagena La Unión was dissolved after the end of the season) (D) | 38 | 25 | 6 | 7 | 73 | 36 | +37 | 81 |
| 5 | Cieza | 38 | 25 | 5 | 8 | 74 | 29 | +45 | 80 |
| 6 | Bala Azul | 38 | 18 | 12 | 8 | 59 | 43 | +16 | 66 |
| 7 | La Hoya Deportiva | 38 | 17 | 9 | 12 | 58 | 51 | +7 | 57 (Note: La Hoya Deportiva was docked 3 points due to their non-appearance in their match against Cieza) |
| 8 | Atl. Pulpileño | 38 | 16 | 9 | 13 | 53 | 42 | +11 | 57 |
| 9 | Molina | 38 | 15 | 8 | 15 | 60 | 45 | +15 | 53 |
| 10 | Pinatar | 38 | 13 | 13 | 12 | 50 | 51 | −1 | 52 |
| 11 | Edeco Fortuna | 38 | 15 | 7 | 16 | 39 | 57 | −18 | 52 |
| 12 | Plus Ultra | 38 | 14 | 6 | 18 | 44 | 57 | −13 | 48 |
| 13 | Santomera | 38 | 12 | 9 | 17 | 43 | 57 | −14 | 45 |
| 14 | Cartagena | 38 | 11 | 10 | 17 | 43 | 61 | −18 | 43 |
| 15 | Moratalla (Note: Moratalla was dissolved after the end of the season and its place was bought by Jumilla.) (D) | 38 | 11 | 8 | 19 | 44 | 69 | −25 | 41 |
| 16 | Calasparra (Note: Calasparra was dissolved after the end of the season) (D) | 38 | 11 | 8 | 19 | 45 | 64 | −19 | 41 |
| 17 | Abarán | 38 | 9 | 9 | 20 | 28 | 47 | −19 | 36 |
| 18 | Puente Tocinos (R) | 38 | 9 | 6 | 23 | 42 | 85 | −43 | 33 |
| 19 | Beniel (R) | 38 | 4 | 3 | 31 | 32 | 93 | −61 | 15 |
| 20 | LD Olímpico (Note: Team withdrawn from the competition and consequently dissolved) (D) | 38 | 2 | 2 | 34 | 7 | 72 | −65 | 8 |

(C) Champions; (D) Dissolved; (R) Relegated

=== Group XIV - Extremadura ===
| Pos | Team | Pld | W | D | L | GF | GA | GD | Pts |
|---|---|---|---|---|---|---|---|---|---|
| 1 | Villanovense (C, P) | 38 | 29 | 6 | 3 | 83 | 30 | +53 | 93 |
| 2 | Sp. Villanueva (P) | 38 | 29 | 5 | 4 | 81 | 24 | +57 | 92 |
| 3 | Arroyo | 38 | 20 | 10 | 8 | 64 | 37 | +27 | 70 |
| 4 | Jerez | 38 | 18 | 10 | 10 | 61 | 32 | +29 | 64 |
| 5 | Mérida | 38 | 15 | 13 | 10 | 48 | 32 | +16 | 58 |
| 6 | Santa Amalia | 38 | 15 | 11 | 12 | 55 | 49 | +6 | 56 |
| 7 | Don Benito | 38 | 16 | 8 | 14 | 48 | 47 | +1 | 56 |
| 8 | Moralo | 38 | 14 | 12 | 12 | 47 | 44 | +3 | 54 |
| 9 | Miajadas | 38 | 15 | 9 | 14 | 38 | 41 | −3 | 54 |
| 10 | Sanvicenteño | 38 | 13 | 12 | 13 | 47 | 39 | +8 | 51 |
| 11 | Ciudad Plasencia | 38 | 14 | 7 | 17 | 41 | 47 | −6 | 49 |
| 12 | Díter Zafra | 38 | 13 | 10 | 15 | 45 | 50 | −5 | 49 |
| 13 | Plasencia | 38 | 11 | 14 | 13 | 39 | 48 | −9 | 47 |
| 14 | Coria | 38 | 12 | 11 | 15 | 41 | 52 | −11 | 47 |
| 15 | Atl. San José | 38 | 12 | 8 | 18 | 52 | 61 | −9 | 44 |
| 16 | Badajoz | 38 | 12 | 6 | 20 | 53 | 68 | −15 | 42 |
| 17 | Valdelacalzada | 38 | 10 | 9 | 19 | 38 | 52 | −14 | 39 |
| 18 | Santa Marta (R) | 38 | 9 | 8 | 21 | 34 | 58 | −24 | 35 |
| 19 | Olivenza (R) | 38 | 6 | 12 | 20 | 39 | 72 | −33 | 30 |
| 20 | Imperio (R) | 38 | 5 | 3 | 30 | 28 | 98 | −70 | 18 |

(C) Champions; (P) Promoted; (R) Relegated

=== Group XV - Navarra ===
| Pos | Team | Pld | W | D | L | GF | GA | GD | Pts |
|---|---|---|---|---|---|---|---|---|---|
| 1 | Tudelano (C) | 38 | 28 | 6 | 4 | 87 | 24 | +63 | 90 |
| 2 | Izarra | 38 | 25 | 8 | 5 | 78 | 24 | +54 | 83 |
| 3 | Valle de Egüés | 38 | 19 | 10 | 9 | 57 | 45 | +12 | 67 |
| 4 | Mutilvera | 38 | 19 | 9 | 10 | 60 | 31 | +29 | 66 |
| 5 | Chantrea | 38 | 18 | 11 | 9 | 58 | 35 | +23 | 65 |
| 6 | Iruña | 38 | 15 | 14 | 9 | 51 | 36 | +15 | 59 |
| 7 | San Juan | 38 | 12 | 20 | 6 | 38 | 30 | +8 | 56 |
| 8 | Cirbonero | 38 | 15 | 8 | 15 | 51 | 46 | +5 | 53 |
| 9 | Lourdes | 38 | 15 | 8 | 15 | 52 | 56 | −4 | 53 |
| 10 | Oberena | 38 | 14 | 10 | 14 | 40 | 39 | +1 | 52 |
| 11 | Pamplona | 38 | 12 | 13 | 13 | 51 | 49 | +2 | 49 |
| 12 | Murchante | 38 | 11 | 12 | 15 | 49 | 57 | −8 | 45 |
| 13 | Huarte | 38 | 10 | 14 | 14 | 45 | 50 | −5 | 44 |
| 14 | Aoiz | 38 | 10 | 12 | 16 | 37 | 48 | −11 | 42 |
| 15 | Aluvión | 38 | 9 | 14 | 15 | 34 | 44 | −10 | 41 |
| 16 | Idoya | 38 | 10 | 11 | 17 | 51 | 78 | −27 | 41 |
| 17 | Ardoi (Note: Ardoi was forced to relegate to Preferente due to there not being any promotions from this group to Segunda División B.) (R) | 38 | 9 | 11 | 18 | 29 | 57 | −28 | 38 |
| 18 | Lagun Artea (R) | 38 | 10 | 7 | 21 | 40 | 79 | −39 | 37 |
| 19 | River Ega (R) | 38 | 7 | 6 | 25 | 26 | 73 | −47 | 27 |
| 20 | Peña Azagresa (R) | 38 | 5 | 10 | 23 | 34 | 63 | −29 | 25 |

(C) Champions; (R) Relegated

=== Group XVI - La Rioja ===
| Pos | Team | Pld | W | D | L | GF | GA | GD | Pts |
|---|---|---|---|---|---|---|---|---|---|
| 1 | Náxara (C) | 38 | 27 | 7 | 4 | 75 | 27 | +48 | 88 |
| 2 | SD Logroñés | 38 | 28 | 4 | 6 | 80 | 29 | +51 | 88 |
| 3 | Anguiano | 38 | 24 | 8 | 6 | 64 | 26 | +38 | 80 |
| 4 | Haro | 38 | 24 | 6 | 8 | 75 | 24 | +51 | 78 |
| 5 | Logroñés B | 38 | 25 | 3 | 10 | 74 | 29 | +45 | 78 |
| 6 | Arnedo | 38 | 23 | 9 | 6 | 68 | 26 | +42 | 78 |
| 7 | Alfaro | 38 | 21 | 10 | 7 | 73 | 37 | +36 | 73 |
| 8 | Oyonesa | 38 | 20 | 10 | 8 | 72 | 40 | +32 | 70 |
| 9 | Calahorra | 38 | 16 | 11 | 11 | 55 | 37 | +18 | 59 |
| 10 | River Ebro | 38 | 15 | 10 | 13 | 47 | 46 | +1 | 55 |
| 11 | Varea | 38 | 15 | 8 | 15 | 57 | 42 | +15 | 53 |
| 12 | Calasancio | 38 | 8 | 13 | 17 | 31 | 47 | −16 | 37 |
| 13 | Vianés | 38 | 10 | 7 | 21 | 52 | 66 | −14 | 37 |
| 14 | Berceo | 38 | 9 | 6 | 23 | 33 | 52 | −19 | 33 |
| 15 | San Marcial | 38 | 8 | 8 | 22 | 30 | 71 | −41 | 32 |
| 16 | Agoncillo | 38 | 7 | 11 | 20 | 28 | 53 | −25 | 32 |
| 17 | Pradejón | 38 | 7 | 6 | 25 | 27 | 75 | −48 | 27 |
| 18 | Aldeano (R) | 38 | 8 | 0 | 30 | 31 | 111 | −80 | 24 |
| 19 | Cenicero (R) | 38 | 5 | 8 | 25 | 29 | 84 | −55 | 23 |
| 20 | AF Calahorra (R) | 38 | 5 | 5 | 28 | 27 | 106 | −79 | 20 |

(C) Champions; (R) Relegated

=== Group XVII - Aragón ===
| Pos | Team | Pld | W | D | L | GF | GA | GD | Pts |
|---|---|---|---|---|---|---|---|---|---|
| 1 | Andorra (C, P) | 38 | 25 | 9 | 4 | 86 | 33 | +53 | 84 |
| 2 | Real Zaragoza B (Note: Real Zaragoza B promoted to Segunda División B after buying the vacant place left by the administrative relegation of Cultural Leonesa to Tercera División.) (P) | 38 | 24 | 7 | 7 | 76 | 30 | +46 | 79 |
| 3 | Utebo | 38 | 23 | 10 | 5 | 74 | 30 | +44 | 79 |
| 4 | Binéfar | 38 | 21 | 8 | 9 | 68 | 48 | +20 | 71 |
| 5 | Ejea | 38 | 20 | 10 | 8 | 75 | 37 | +38 | 70 |
| 6 | Barbastro | 38 | 18 | 7 | 13 | 54 | 48 | +6 | 61 |
| 7 | Calatayud | 38 | 17 | 9 | 12 | 58 | 46 | +12 | 60 |
| 8 | Villanueva | 38 | 17 | 9 | 12 | 60 | 37 | +23 | 60 |
| 9 | Sabiñánigo | 38 | 16 | 12 | 10 | 60 | 43 | +17 | 60 |
| 10 | Monzón | 38 | 17 | 7 | 14 | 49 | 34 | +15 | 58 |
| 11 | Valdefierro | 38 | 15 | 9 | 14 | 55 | 54 | +1 | 54 |
| 12 | Tarazona | 38 | 15 | 6 | 17 | 53 | 62 | −9 | 51 |
| 13 | Ebro | 38 | 12 | 6 | 20 | 60 | 68 | −8 | 42 |
| 14 | Tauste | 38 | 11 | 8 | 19 | 39 | 56 | −17 | 41 |
| 15 | Sariñena | 38 | 10 | 9 | 19 | 35 | 55 | −20 | 39 |
| 16 | Giner Torrero | 38 | 11 | 5 | 22 | 40 | 76 | −36 | 38 |
| 17 | Altorricón (R) | 38 | 8 | 11 | 19 | 31 | 66 | −35 | 35 |
| 18 | Pomar (R) | 38 | 10 | 5 | 23 | 34 | 72 | −38 | 35 |
| 19 | Santa Isabel (R) | 38 | 8 | 4 | 26 | 42 | 86 | −44 | 28 |
| 20 | Mallén (R) | 38 | 4 | 5 | 29 | 30 | 98 | −68 | 17 |

(C) Champions; (P) Promoted; (R) Relegated

=== Group XVIII - Castilla-La Mancha ===
| Pos | Team | Pld | W | D | L | GF | GA | GD | Pts |
|---|---|---|---|---|---|---|---|---|---|
| 1 | Toledo (C, P) | 38 | 26 | 10 | 2 | 75 | 18 | +57 | 88 |
| 2 | Albacete B | 38 | 22 | 9 | 7 | 72 | 31 | +41 | 75 |
| 3 | La Roda (P) | 38 | 21 | 12 | 5 | 69 | 30 | +39 | 75 |
| 4 | Almansa | 38 | 20 | 12 | 6 | 54 | 25 | +29 | 72 |
| 5 | Villarrubia | 38 | 20 | 11 | 7 | 59 | 32 | +27 | 71 |
| 6 | Illescas | 38 | 20 | 9 | 9 | 62 | 37 | +25 | 69 |
| 7 | Azuqueca | 38 | 20 | 8 | 10 | 70 | 39 | +31 | 68 |
| 8 | Marchamalo | 38 | 17 | 9 | 12 | 54 | 45 | +9 | 60 |
| 9 | La Gineta | 38 | 15 | 9 | 14 | 47 | 51 | −4 | 54 |
| 10 | Quintanar del Rey | 38 | 12 | 16 | 10 | 39 | 49 | −10 | 52 |
| 11 | Socuéllamos | 38 | 15 | 6 | 17 | 51 | 51 | 0 | 51 |
| 12 | Tomelloso | 38 | 13 | 9 | 16 | 49 | 55 | −6 | 48 |
| 13 | Manzanares | 38 | 12 | 8 | 18 | 41 | 51 | −10 | 44 |
| 14 | Villarrobledo | 38 | 11 | 10 | 17 | 43 | 49 | −6 | 43 |
| 15 | Torrijos | 38 | 11 | 7 | 20 | 36 | 50 | −14 | 40 |
| 16 | Carranque | 38 | 10 | 9 | 19 | 34 | 58 | −24 | 39 |
| 17 | Hellín | 38 | 9 | 11 | 18 | 36 | 55 | −19 | 38 |
| 18 | Chozas de Canales (R) | 38 | 9 | 7 | 22 | 31 | 66 | −35 | 34 |
| 19 | Piedrabuena (R) | 38 | 3 | 8 | 27 | 34 | 95 | −61 | 17 |
| 20 | U. Criptanense (R) | 38 | 2 | 7 | 29 | 17 | 80 | −63 | 13 |

(C) Champions; (P) Promoted; (R) Relegated

=== Key ===
Key to colours in league table:
Promoted via playoffs
Participated in playoffs
Direct relegation

== Promotion play-offs ==
=== Group winners promotion play-off ===
Promoted to Segunda División B: Marino de Luanco, Villanovense, Valencia Mestalla, Burgos, Amorebieta, Toledo, Llagostera, Andorra and Linense.

=== Non-champions promotion play-off ===
Promoted to Segunda División B:Reus Deportiu, Olímpic Xàtiva, Manacor, Sp. Villanueva, Arandina, S.S. Reyes, Sestao River, Gimn. Segoviana and La Roda.
