= Marco Navas =

Spanish former footballer (born 1982)

Personal information
- Full name: Marco Antonio Navas González
- Date of birth: 21 September 1982 (age 44)
- Place of birth: Los Palacios, Spain
- Height: 1.75 m (5 ft 9 in)
- Position: Midfielder

Youth career
- Los Palacios
- 2000–2001: Sevilla

Senior career*
Years	Team	Apps	(Gls)
2001–2003	Sevilla C		
2002–2006	Sevilla B	63	(8)
2004–2006	Sevilla	3	(0)
2005–2006	→ Poli Ejido (loan)	30	(1)
2006–2009	Xerez	50	(1)
2008–2009	→ Albacete (loan)	31	(1)
2009–2010	Guadalajara	32	(6)
2010–2011	Huesca	13	(1)
2011–2012	Elche	0	(0)
2011–2012	→ Leganés (loan)	20	(0)
2012–2013	Recreativo	3	(0)
2013–2014	Bury	2	(0)
2014	Cabecense		
Total		247	(18)
- * Club domestic league appearances and goals

Marco Antonio Navas González (born 21 September 1982) is a Spanish former professional footballer who played as a right midfielder.

He amassed Segunda División totals of 127 matches and four goals over six seasons, representing five teams. In La Liga, he appeared for Sevilla.

== Club career ==
Navas was born in Los Palacios y Villafranca, Province of Seville. A product of Sevilla FC's youth system, he made his debut for the first team in the 2003–04 season, playing three La Liga matches as a substitute; he played mainly with the reserves during his spell, however.

In the 2005–06 campaign, Navas served a loan stint with another Andalusian side, Polideportivo Ejido (Segunda División), following which he lost all ties with Sevilla and joined neighbours Xerez CD. For 2008–09 he was loaned to Albacete Balompié in the same league, appearing regularly as they barely retained their league status; he was subsequently released by Xerez, moving down to Segunda División B by joining CD Guadalajara.

Navas continued to alternate between the second and third tiers the following years, with SD Huesca, CD Leganés and Recreativo de Huelva. He spent the vast majority of his only season with the latter club on the sidelines, due to injury.

On 16 August 2013, aged nearly 31, Navas moved abroad for the first time in his career, signing for Bury of the English League Two. He debuted on 3 September against Port Vale in the Football League Trophy, only racking up three appearances before returning home the following 24 January by mutual consent.

== Personal life ==
Navas' younger brother, Jesús, was also a footballer and a midfielder. He too represented, but with great individual and team success, Sevilla, and helped the Spain national team win the 2010 FIFA World Cup, UEFA Euro 2012, 2022-23 UEFA Nations League and UEFA Euro 2024.

Their family was of Gitano/Romani origin.
