= Mesón do Bento CF =

Mesón do Bento
- Full name: Mesón do Bento Club de Fútbol
- Founded: 1979 (as Mesón do Vento CF)
- Dissolved: 2016
- Ground: Monte Roxo
- Capacity: 1,500
- 2015–16: Terceira Autonómica – Group 3, 3rd of 11
Home colours	Away colours

Mesón do Bento Club de Fútbol was a Spanish football team based in Mesón do Bento, Ordes, in the autonomous community of Galicia. Founded in 1979 and dissolved in 2016, it last played in Terceira Autonómica – Group 3, holding home matches at Estadio Monte Roxo, which has a capacity of 1,500 spectators.

== History ==
For 2011–12 season, Mesón do Bento renounced to play in Tercera División. Ultimaltely, it was entered in Segunda Autonómica.

== Season to season ==
Season	Tier	Division	Place	Copa del Rey
1979–80	8	3ª Reg.	5th	
1980–81	8	3ª Reg.	4th	
1981–82	7	2ª Reg.	3rd	
1982–83	6	1ª Reg.	9th	
1983–84	6	1ª Reg.	19th	
1984–85	7	2ª Reg.	9th	
1985–86	7	2ª Reg.	3rd	
1986–87	6	1ª Reg.	17th	
1987–88	7	2ª Reg.	4th	
1988–89	7	2ª Reg.	1st	
1989–90	6	1ª Reg.	15th	
1990–91	6	1ª Reg.	18th	
1991–92	7	2ª Reg.	6th	
1992–93	7	2ª Reg.	8th	
1993–94	7	2ª Reg.	18th	
1994–95	8	3ª Reg.	4th	
1995–96	8	3ª Reg.	2nd	
1996–97	8	3ª Reg.	(R)	
1997–98	DNP			

Season	Tier	Division	Place	Copa del Rey
1998–99	DNP			
1999–2000	DNP			
2000–01	8	3ª Reg.	11th	
2001–02	8	3ª Reg.	1st	
2002–03	7	2ª Reg.	8th	
2003–04	7	2ª Reg.	14th	
2004–05	8	3ª Reg.	3rd	
2005–06	8	3ª Reg.	1st	
2006–07	7	2ª Aut.	3rd	
2007–08	7	2ª Aut.	2nd	
2008–09	6	1ª Aut.	1st	
2009–10	5	Pref. Aut.	1st	
2010–11	4	3ª	13th	
2011–12	7	2ª Aut.	16th	
2012–13	8	3ª Aut.	14th	
2013–14	8	3ª Aut.	2nd	
2014–15	8	3ª Aut.	3rd	
2015–16	8	3ª Aut.	3rd	

- 1 seasons in Tercera División
