= Between Us (2024 film) =

- Theatrical release poster
- Directed by: Martin Casapía Casanova
- Written by: Samuel del Amor
- Starring: Alessandra Fuller; Diego Domínguez
- Cinematography: Gianmarco Ahon
- Edited by: Roberto Benavides; Sara Oscco
- Music by: Adrian Nicholas Valdez
- Production company: Jungle Pictures
- Distributed by: Cinecolor Films Perú
- Release date: October 31, 2024
- Running time: 84 minutes
- Country: Peru
- Language: Spanish

Between Us (Spanish: Entre nosotros) is a 2024 Peruvian mystery thriller film directed by Martin Casapía Casanova and written by Samuel del Amor. Starring Alessandra Fuller and Diego Domínguez accompanied by Miguel Iza, Adrián Pedraja, Rosalinda Galán and Alfons Nieto. It follows five friends who, during their stay on an isolated farm, become involved in a tragedy when one of them turns up dead. It premiered on October 31, 2024, in Peruvian theaters.

== Synopsis ==
A group of 5 friends decide to spend a weekend in a country house far from Lima, with the aim of celebrating a birthday. However, the celebration takes an unexpected turn when one of them turns up dead under mysterious circumstances. What initially seemed like a relaxing escape turns into a dangerous game of suspicion and revelations that will test the loyalty of the survivors.

== Cast ==
- Alessandra Fuller as Catia
- Diego Domínguez as Carlos
- Miguel Iza as Kansas
- Adrián Pedraja as Adrián
- Rosalinda Galán as Victoria
- Alfons Nieto as Renzo
- Ramón García
- Anai Padilla

== Production ==
Principal photography began on August 9, 2022, in Lima, Peru.

== Reception ==
=== Box office ===
The film attracted 3,000 spectators on its first day in theaters, reaching 14,000 tickets sold, reaching sixth place.

=== Critical reception ===
Sebastián Zavala from Cinencuentro positively highlights the technical section, the correct direction of Martin Casapía and the correct performances by the supporting cast, but criticizes the film's plot, which becomes absurd, the characters are desperate and hateful for the viewer and the performance of the main actress is rigid and implausible.
