= UD Pájara Playas de Jandía =

Spanish football club

Pájara Playas
- Full name: Unión Deportiva Pájara Playas de Jandía
- Founded: 1996
- Dissolved: 2011
- Ground: Benito Alonso, Pájara, Canary Islands, Spain
- Capacity: 3,000
- 2010–11: 3ª – Group 12, 8th
| Home colours | Away colours |

Unión Deportiva Pájara Playas de Jandía was a Spanish football team based in Pájara, island of Fuerteventura, in the autonomous community of Canary Islands. Founded in 1996 and dissolved in 2011, it held home games at Estadio Benito Alonso, with a capacity of 3,000 seaters.

== History ==
Unión Deportiva Pájara Playas de Jandía was founded in 1996, after buying Unión Deportiva La Pared's berth, a club founded 20 years earlier. It promoted to the third division at the first attempt, going on to remain there 12 consecutive years – in 2003–04 it finished second in its group, but failed in the promotion playoffs.

Pájara was dissolved on 12 July 2011, due to economic limitations.

== Season to season ==
| Season | Tier | Division | Place | Copa del Rey |
|---|---|---|---|---|
| 1996–97 | 4 | 3ª | 4th | |
| 1997–98 | 3 | 2ª B | 8th | First round |
| 1998–99 | 3 | 2ª B | 15th | |
| 1999–2000 | 3 | 2ª B | 10th | |
| 2000–01 | 3 | 2ª B | 6th | Round of 32 |
| 2001–02 | 3 | 2ª B | 14th | |
| 2002–03 | 3 | 2ª B | 8th | |
| 2003–04 | 3 | 2ª B | 2nd | |

| Season | Tier | Division | Place | Copa del Rey |
|---|---|---|---|---|
| 2004–05 | 3 | 2ª B | 15th | First round |
| 2005–06 | 3 | 2ª B | 12th | |
| 2006–07 | 3 | 2ª B | 16th | |
| 2007–08 | 3 | 2ª B | 9th | |
| 2008–09 | 3 | 2ª B | 18th | |
| 2009–10 | 4 | 3ª | 3rd | |
| 2010–11 | 4 | 3ª | 8th | |

- 12 seasons in Segunda División B
- 3 seasons in Tercera División

== Famous players ==
- (Denmark) Thomas Gant
- (Equatorial Guinea) Iván Zarandona
- (France) Kike Gandul
- (Spain) Oinatz Aulestia
- (Spain) David Bauzá
- (Spain) José Bercianos
- (Spain) Leo Bermejo
- (Spain) Raúl Borrero
- (Spain) Adrián Colunga
- (Spain) Saúl Berjón
- (Spain) Nauzet Fernández
- (Spain) David Gómez
- (Spain) Andoni Lakabeg
- (Spain) Antonio Robaina
- (Spain) Ramón Sánchez
- (Argentina) Marco Robertino Actiz
- (Venezuela) Carlos Becerra
