= Lorca Deportiva CF =

Defunct Spanish association football club

Lorca Deportiva
- Full name: Lorca Deportiva; Club de Fútbol, S.A.D.
- Founded: 2002
- Dissolved: 2012
- Ground: Francisco Artés Carrasco; Lorca, Murcia, Spain
- Capacity: 8,064
- 2010–11: 3ª – Group 13, (R)
Home colours	Away colours	Third colours

Lorca Deportiva Club de Fútbol, S.A.D. was a Spanish football club in Lorca, in the autonomous community of Murcia. Founded in 2002 it was dissolved ten years later, they held their home matches at Estadio Francisco Artés Carrasco, which seats 8,064. The roots of the club can be traced back to the Sociedad Lorca Football Club, founded in 1901 by Newcastle-born Manuel José (Manni) Pelegrín Dunn, whose father was originally from Lorca. The CF Lorca Deportiva became the successor club and is followed by the same fan-base.

== History ==
Lorca Deportiva was founded in 2002, right after the defunction of Lorca Club de Fútbol which had been born eight years earlier. The new club started in the fourth division after acquiring the place of CD Balsicas, and was promoted to the third level at the first attempt.

As rookies in the third tier, Lorca qualified for the play-offs after occupying the second place in the regular season. Next season the team finished fourth, but this time managed to promote to the division two: with Unai Emery – who later managed Paris Saint-Germain, Arsenal F.C. and Aston Villa – in the position of manager, it narrowly missed on a new promotion, finishing just five points behind last La Liga promotee Levante UD.

After Emery's departure, with many first-team players also leaving, Lorca was relegated the following campaign. In the middle of 2009, although it had just finished second in its group, economic issues led to another drop, to the fourth division.

For the 2010–11 season, the club was relocated to nearby Totana and renamed LD Olímpico. On 18 October 2010, amidst serious economic problems, it retired from competition and folded, without chairman or players – all 93 points that the team would lose for not showing up in the remaining 31 fixtures of the season were equally distributed by their opponents, and Lorca was finally dissolved in 2012.

== Season to season ==
Season	Tier	Division	Place	Copa del Rey
2002–03	4	3ª	1st	
2003–04	3	2ª B	2nd	Round of 64
2004–05	3	2ª B	4th	Round of 16
2005–06	2	2ª	5th	First round
2006–07	2	2ª	21st	Second round
2007–08	3	2ª B	11th	First round
2008–09	3	2ª B	2nd	
2009–10	4	3ª	3rd	First round
2010–11	4	3ª	(R)	

- 2 seasons in Segunda División
- 4 seasons in Segunda División B
- 3 seasons in Tercera División
