= Carlos García (footballer, born 1977) =

Venezuelan footballer (born 1977)

Personal information
- Full name: Carlos García Becerra
- Date of birth: 9 September 1977 (age 49)
- Place of birth: Caracas, Venezuela
- Position: Forward

Senior career*
Years	Team	Apps	(Gls)
1997–1998	Deportivo de La Coruña	7	(1)
1997–2003	Deportivo Fabril		
2000–2001	→ Gimnástica de Torrelavega (loan)		
2001–2002	→ Pájara Playas (loan)		
2003–2004	Ourense		
2004–2005	Burgos		
2005	Alicante		
2005–2009	Palencia		
2009–2010	Buelna		
2010–2011	Rayo Cantabria		
- * Club domestic league appearances and goals

Carlos García Becerra (born 9 September 1977) is a former Venezuelan professional footballer who played as a forward.

== Career ==
García was born in Caracas, the son of two Galician emigrants from the province of La Coruña. He began his career in Spanish football in the ranks of Deportivo de La Coruña and his performances soon led to him opportunities in the first team, with whom he played seven games, scoring a goal on his debut. Things did not end up going well for him and he remained for two more seasons in the reserve team.

In the following two seasons, he played for Gimnástica de Torrelavega, Pájara Playas, and Amurrio, all in the Second Division. He returned to Deportivo's reserve team in the 2002–03 season. They finished second in their group, failed to gain promotion, and he eventually left the club.

Garcia was close to signing for Scottish side Livingston in June 2003, but the deal was not finalised.

He returned to play in the Second Division B , this time with Ourense and Burgos, where he scored 9 and 17 goals respectively. These successful personal campaigns earned him a move to one of the strongest teams in the division, Alicante.

Garcia never fully exploded onto the scene at the Valencian club and decided to sign for Palencia. He played for them for three and a half seasons, experiencing a playoff for promotion to the Second Division, a relegation to the Third Division and a promotion to Second Division again. He became one of the most beloved players by the fans and left the club for work reasons "with the team where I took him, in Second Division B ", as he himself said on the day of his farewell.

He moved to Cantabria and played for Third Division teams such as Buelna and Rayo Cantabria, where he retired in the summer of 2012.
