= Estadio Francisco Artés Carrasco =

Multi-use stadium in Lorca, Spain

Francisco Artés Carrasco
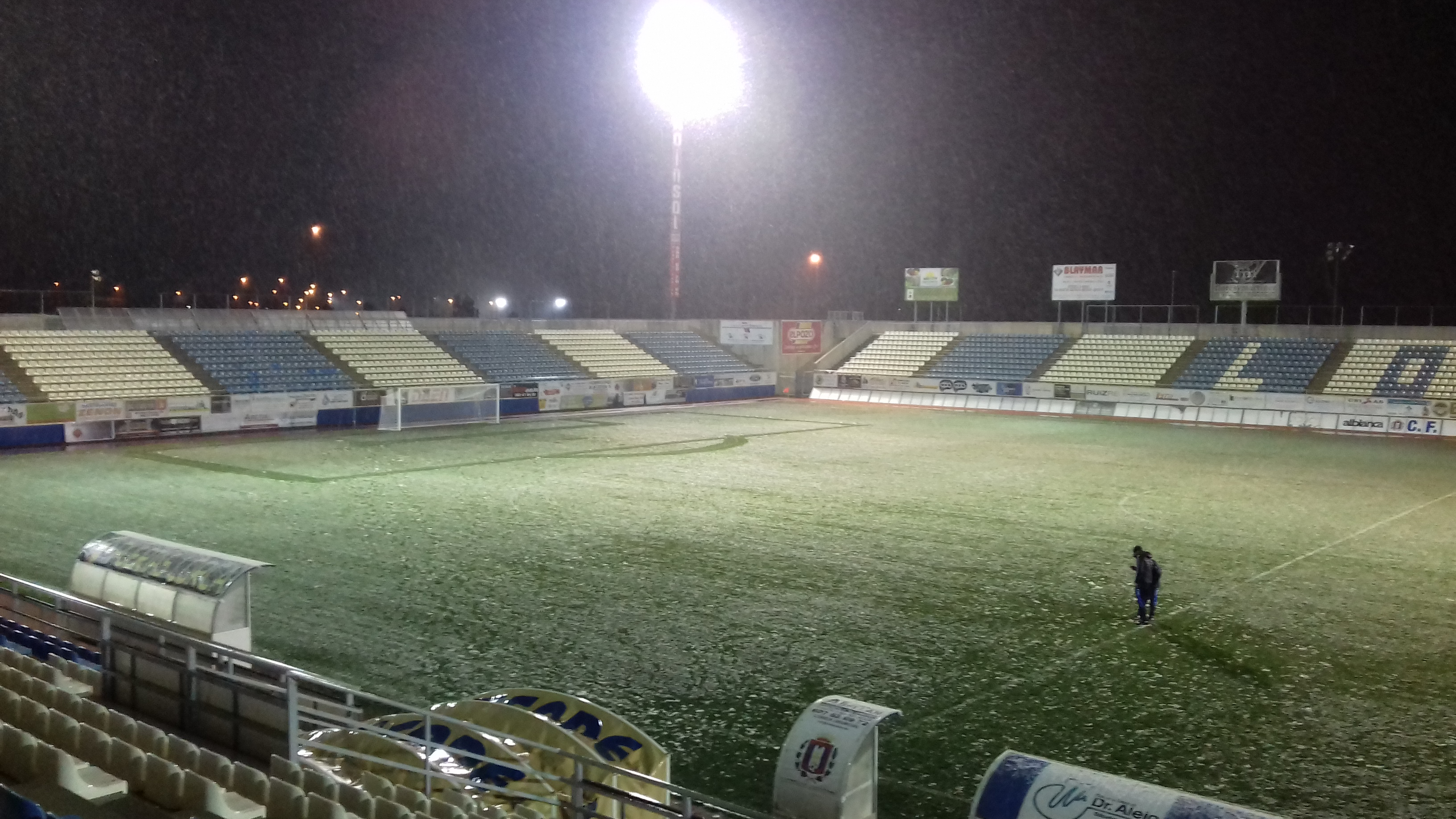
- The stadium, after a respectably snowy snow storm in January 2017
- Interactive map of Francisco Artés Carrasco
- Location: Lorca, Spain
- Coordinates: 37°38′19.74″N 1°44′06.44″W
- Capacity: 8,120
- Surface: Grass
- Field size: 105 x 70 m

Construction
- Groundbreaking: 29 November 2001
- Built: 2001–2003
- Opened: 5 March 2003
- Cost: €3,500,000
- Architect: Cristino Guerra
- Project manager: Construcciones Giner

Tenants
- Lorca Deportiva CF (2003–2010); Lorca Atlético CF (2010–2012); Lorca FC (former La Hoya Lorca CF) (2011–2021); CF Lorca Deportiva (2012–); Alhama CF (temporaly) (2025-present)

Estadio Francisco Artes Carrasco is a multi-use stadium in Lorca, Spain. It is currently used mostly for football matches and is the former home ground of Lorca Deportiva CF. It was the home ground of Lorca FC before its dissolution and the current CF Lorca Deportiva. The stadium holds 8,120.

== History ==
The stadium was inaugurated on 5 March 2003, with a friendly match between FC Barcelona and Lorca Deportiva CF that finished 1–4 for the Catalans.

On 14 October 2008, it hosted a Spain under-21 team official match.

The stadium was used as a hospital after the 2011 Lorca earthquake.

== Gallery ==
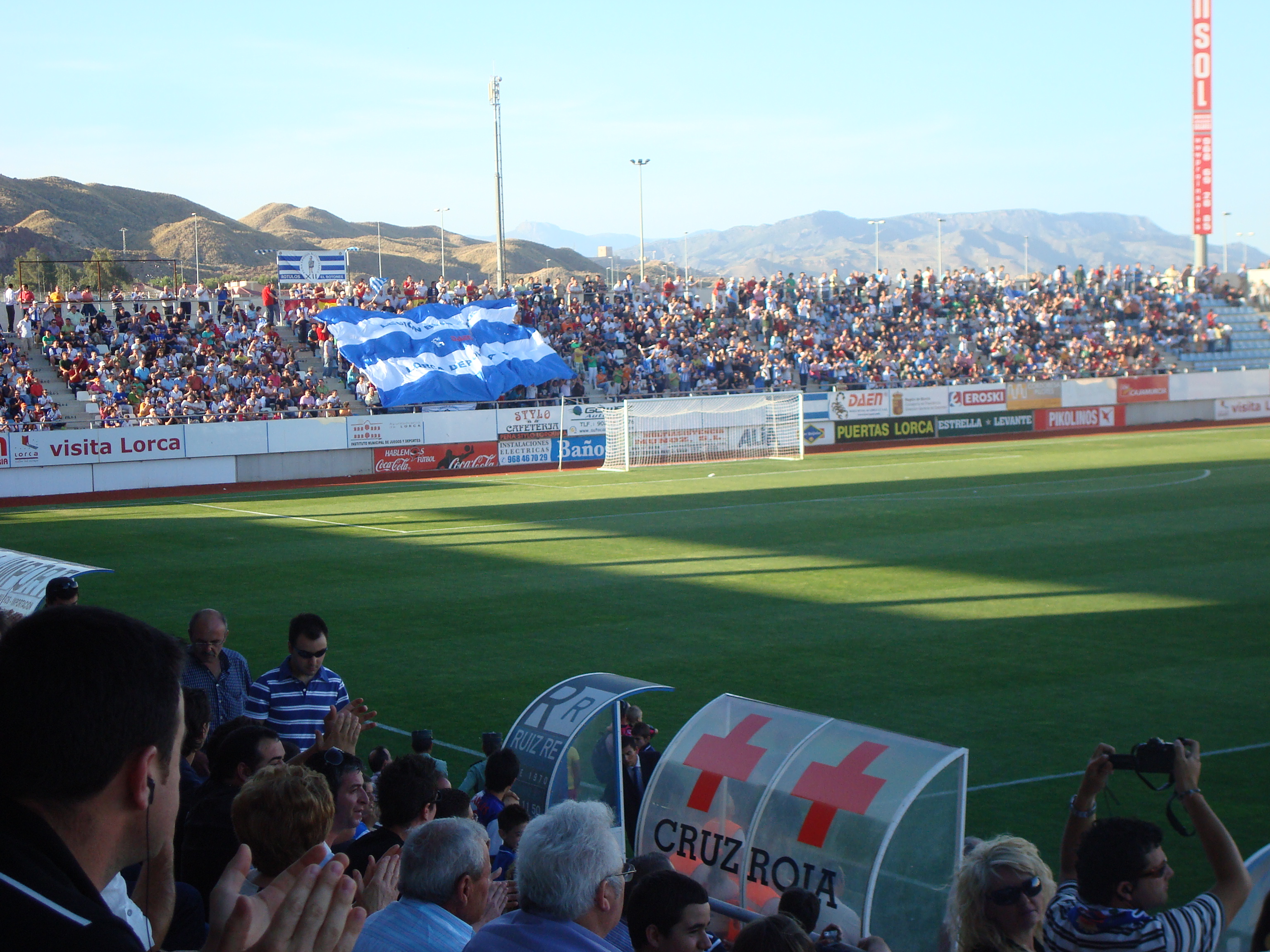
A match in 2009

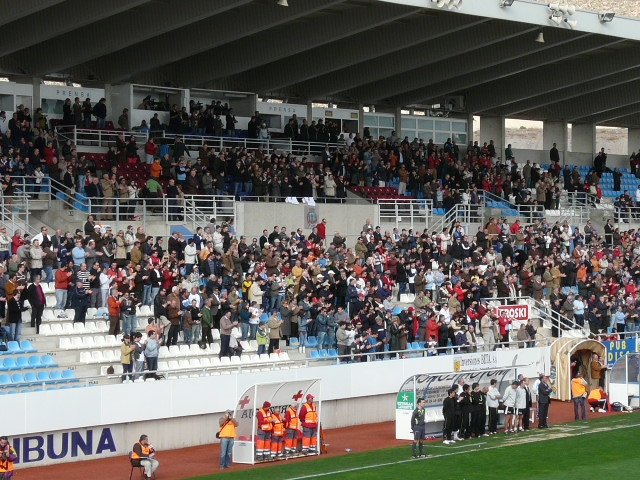
Main tribune
