= Philippe Toledo =

French footballer (born 1983)

Personal information
- Full name: Philippe Dominique Toledo
- Date of birth: 18 December 1983 (age 42)
- Place of birth: Avignon, France
- Height: 1.84 m (6 ft 0 in)
- Position: Striker

Youth career
- Nîmes

Senior career*
Years	Team	Apps	(Gls)
2001–2005	Zaragoza B	99	(37)
2005–2007	Elche	18	(4)
2007	→ Levante B (loan)	20	(3)
2007–2008	Cartagena	33	(3)
2008–2009	Valencia B	34	(8)
2009–2011	Jaén	59	(16)
2011–2012	Ceuta	19	(2)
2012	Gandía	12	(2)
2012–2013	Villefranche	30	(6)
2013–2015	Guadalajara	71	(20)
2015–2018	Le Pontet	53	(18)
Total		449	(118)
- * Club domestic league appearances and goals

Philippe Dominique Toledo (born 18 December 1983) is a French former professional footballer who played as a striker.

== Career ==
Born in Avignon, Toledo played youth football with Nîmes. Not yet aged 18, he moved to Spain where he would remain the following decade, in representation of Zaragoza B, Elche, Levante B, Cartagena, Valencia Mestalla, Real Jaén, Ceuta, Gandía, and Guadalajara; he went on to amass Segunda División and Segunda División B totals of 356 games and 94 goals, notably scoring five times for Zaragoza's reserves in a 7–3 away victory over Peralta on 6 April 2003.

In the 2005–06 season and the first half of the following campaign, Toledo had his first and only experience as a professional, with second-tier club Elche. He scored in his debut in the competition, a 1–1 home draw against Eibar on 29 January of that year. In July 2007, following a loan at Levante B, he was released.

Toledo also played in his native France, and scored 6 goals in 30 matches for Villefranche and 18 goals in 53 games for Le Pontet.

== Personal life ==
Toledo is of Spanish descent.
