= Los Palacios y Villafranca =

- City
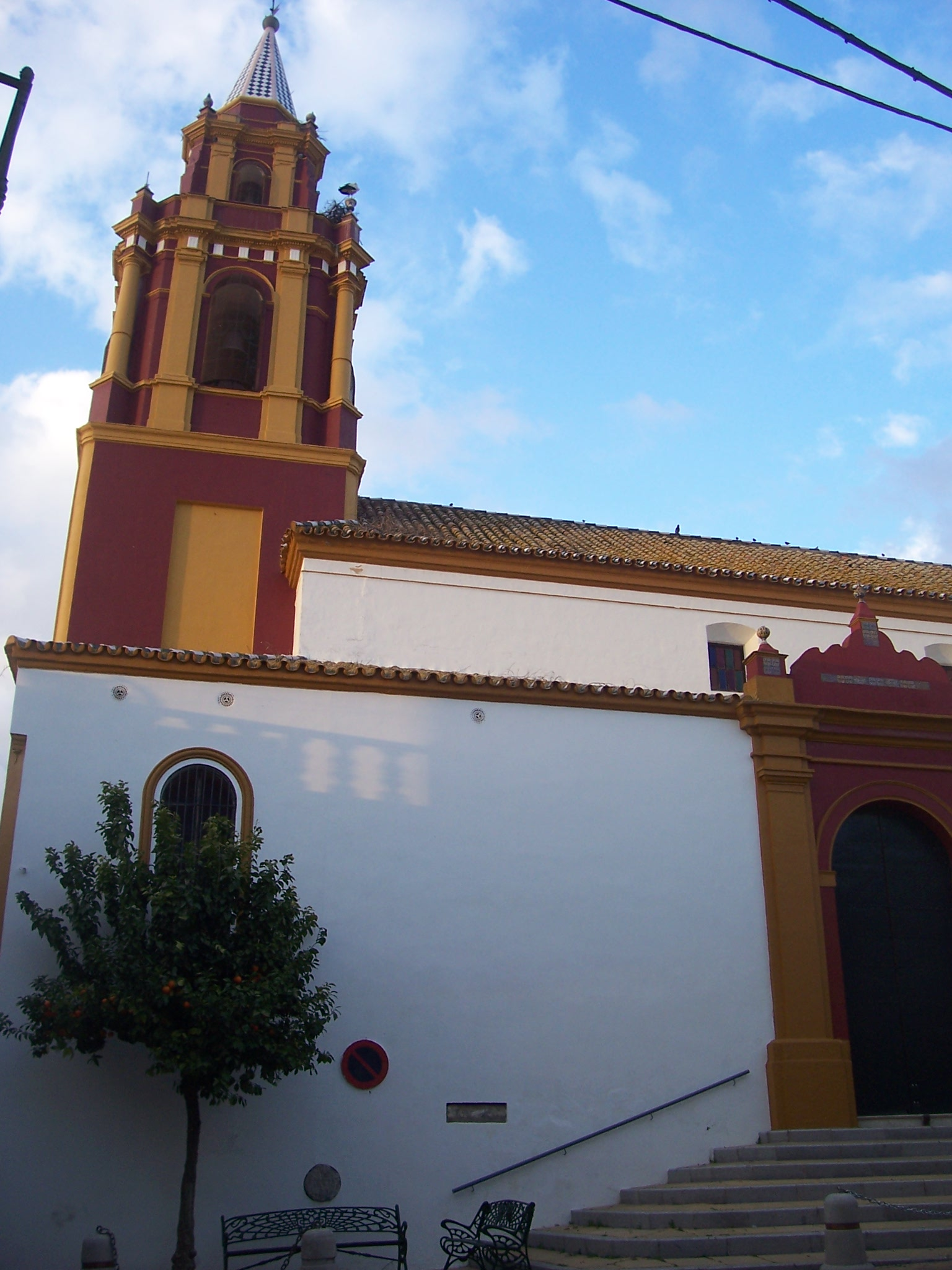
- Los Palacios y Villafranca

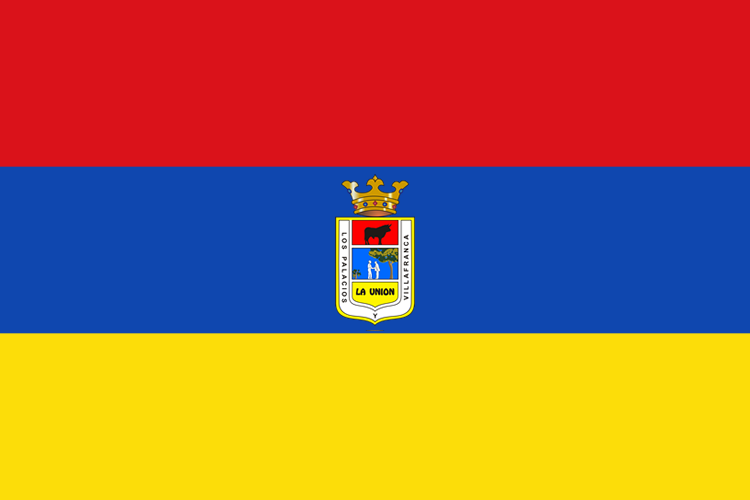
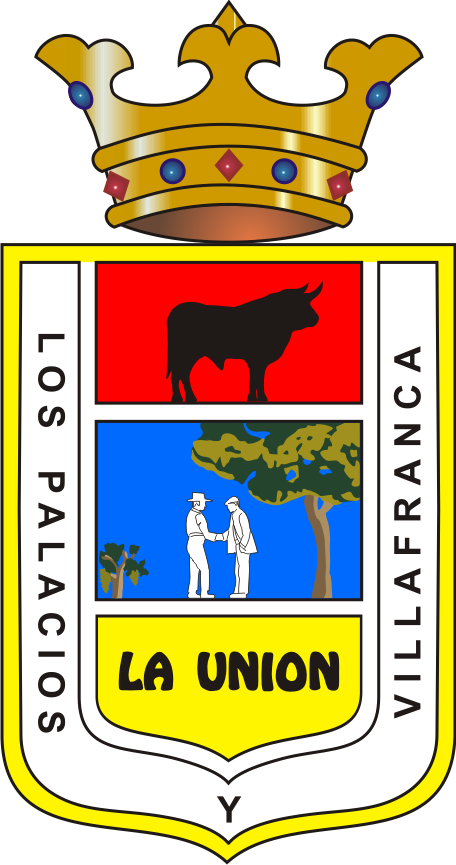
- Flag Coat of arms
- Interactive map of Los Palacios y Villafranca
- Coordinates: 37°9′45″N 5°55′27″W
- Country: Spain
- Autonomous community: Andalusia
- Province: Seville
- Municipality: Los Palacios y Villafranca

Area
  - Total: 114 km^{2} (44 sq mi)
- Elevation: 8 m (26 ft)

Population (2025-01-01)
  - Total: 38,761
  - Density: 340/km^{2} (881/sq mi)
- Time zone: UTC+1 (CET)
  - Summer (DST): UTC+2 (CEST)

Los Palacios y Villafranca is a city located in the province of Seville, Spain. According to the 2006 census (INE), the city has a population of 35,225 inhabitants.

== Gastronomy ==
Los Palacios y Villafranca features a growing gastronomic scene. One of its notable establishments is La Santa Taberna, which opened recently and quickly gained popularity among locals. The restaurant was awarded at the town's Tapas Fair (Feria de la Tapa), held during the Agroganadera Fair, where its zucchini croquettes received recognition from the event's jury.

== Twin towns and sister cities ==
- Los Palacios, Cuba
- Saint-Colomban, Loire-Atlantique, France
- Rivanazzano Terme, Italy

== Notable people ==
- José Antonio Rueda (born 2005), motorcycling world champion.
- Gavi (born 2004), football player, World Champion
- Jesús Navas (born 1985), football player
- Marco Navas (born 1982), football player
- Fabián Ruiz (born 1996), football player, World Champion
- Rosalinda Galán (born 1990), singer, songwriter and actress

== See also ==
- List of municipalities in Seville
