= Asuero =

Asuero is a Spanish surname. Notable people with the surname include:

- Fernando Asuero (1887–1942), Spanish footballer
- Pablo Martín Asuero (born 1967), Spanish scholar from the Basque Country
- Vicente Asuero y Cortázar (1806–1873), Spanish physician and professor at the Central University
