= Luis Ayllón =

Spanish football manager (born 1983)

Personal information
- Full name: Luis Ayllón Regidor
- Date of birth: 24 June 1983 (age 43)
- Place of birth: Barajas de Melo, Spain

Youth career
- EMF Cuenca
- CD Cuenca
- Conquense

Senior career*
Years	Team	Apps	(Gls)
- CD Cuenca
- Conquense B

Managerial career
- Athletic Bilbao (youth)
- Periso (youth)
- Guadalajara (youth)
- 2012–2014: Azuqueca (assistant)
- 2014–2015: Azuqueca
- 2016–2017: Toledo B
- 2017–2019: Conquense
- 2019–2021: Navalcarnero
- 2022: Unionistas
- 2022–2023: SS Reyes
- 2024: Talavera
- * Club domestic league appearances and goals

Luis Ayllón Regidor (born 24 June 1983) is a Spanish football manager and former player.

== Career ==
Born in Barajas de Melo, Cuenca, Castilla–La Mancha, Ayllón played as a youth for EMF Cuenca, CD Cuenca and UB Conquense, making his senior debut with CD Cuenca in Tercera División. After representing Conquense's reserve team, he retired and became a manager of Athletic Bilbao's youth sides, after being invited by Joaquín Caparrós.

After working in the youth sides of Periso CF, Ayllón was also a manager of a Real Madrid foundation team and later became a youth coordinator at CD Guadalajara. In 2012, he became Miguel López's assistant at CD Azuqueca, and was named manager of the club ahead of the 2014–15 season.

In May 2015, despite achieving promotion to Tercera División, Ayllón left Azuqueca. On 5 July 2016, after one year as manager of the Castilla–La Mancha Football Federation's youth sides, he was named at the helm of CD Toledo's B-team in the fourth division.

On 19 June 2017, after avoiding relegation, Ayllón took over UB Conquense also in division four. He led Conquense to promotion in his first year, but was sacked on 14 January 2019, after a nine-match winless streak which saw the club enter the relegation zone.

On 4 June 2019, Ayllón took over CDA Navalcarnero also in the fourth level, and renewed his contract in May 2020 after reaching the promotion play-offs. After achieving promotion to Segunda División B, he led the side of the round of 16 of the 2020–21 Copa del Rey, but opted to leave on 12 May 2021, after retaining Naval's place in the newly-formed Segunda División RFEF.

On 14 March 2022, after nearly a year of inactivity, Ayllón was appointed manager of Primera División RFEF side Unionistas de Salamanca CF for the rest of the campaign, replacing sacked Dani Mori. He left the club by mutual agreement on 1 June, after narrowly missing out a play-off spot.

On 6 June 2022, Ayllón took over UD San Sebastián de los Reyes also in the third division, but was dismissed on 16 January of the following year. On 9 April 2024, after more than a year without a club, he was appointed manager of Segunda Federación side CF Talavera de la Reina, on a contract until the end of the season; he replaced sacked Pedro Díaz. On 22 May 2024, Ayllón left Talavera, following the expiration of his contract.

== Managerial statistics ==
As of match played 5 May 2024

Managerial record by team and tenure
Team	From	To	Record								Ref
Team	From	To	G	W	D	L	GF	GA	GD	Win %	Ref
Azuqueca	1 July 2014	29 May 2015	34	26	4	4	92	21	+71	76.47	
Toledo B	5 July 2016	19 June 2017	38	12	8	18	47	61	−14	31.58	
Conquense	19 June 2017	13 January 2019	64	30	16	18	93	70	+23	46.88	
Navalcarnero	4 June 2019	12 May 2021	58	24	19	15	71	56	+15	41.38	
Unionistas	14 March 2022	1 June 2022	11	6	2	3	16	10	+6	54.55	
UD Sanse	6 June 2022	16 January 2023	19	7	2	10	18	29	−11	36.84	
Talavera	9 April 2024	22 May 2024	4	1	0	3	1	3	−2	25.00	
Career total			228	106	51	71	338	250	+88	46.49	—
