= 2022 Primera División RFEF play-offs =

The 2022 Primera División RFEF play-offs (Playoffs de Ascenso or Promoción de Ascenso) were the final play-offs for promotion from 2021–22 Primera División RFEF to the 2022–23 Segunda División.

== Venues ==
On 16 March 2022, Galicia was announced as the venue for the promotion play-off, initially the cities of A Coruña and Ferrol were confirmed. On 5 May, the RFEF announced Vigo as the third host city.

A Coruña	Ferrol
Estadio Riazor	Estadio de A Malata
Capacity: 34,899	Capacity: 12,043
Vigo	2022 Primera División RFEF play-offs is located in Galicia
Estadio de Balaídos	2022 Primera División RFEF play-offs is located in Galicia
Capacity: 29,000	2022 Primera División RFEF play-offs is located in Galicia

== Format ==
Teams ranked second through fifth in each of the two groups will qualify for the promotion play-off, which will determine the last two promotion spots. The eight qualified teams will be drawn into two fixed brackets, each of which will contain the second and fourth place finishers from one group and the third and fifth place finishers from the other. All ties will consist of a single neutral-site match. In case of draws, an overtime period will be played; if the match is still tied following the overtime, the team which achieved a higher regular season finish will be proclaimed the winner.

=== Bracket ===
Semi–finals (4 June)
Deportivo La Coruña	4
Linares	0
Albacete	2
Rayo Majadahonda	1

Final (11 June)
Deportivo La Coruña	1
Albacete (a.e.t.)	2

Semi–finals (5 June)
Villarreal B	3
UD Logroñés	1
Racing de Ferrol	0
Gimnàstic	1

Final (11 June)
Villarreal B	2
Gimnàstic	0

==== Matches ====
===== Semi–finals =====
Team 1	Score	Team 2
Deportivo La Coruña	4–0	Linares
Albacete	2–1	Rayo Majadahonda
Villarreal B	3–1	UD Logroñés
Racing de Ferrol	0–1	Gimnàstic

4 June 2022	Deportivo La Coruña	4–0	Linares	A Coruña
21:00 UTC+2	Quiles 45+3' (pen.) 70'; Soriano 64'; Bergantiños 68'	Report		Stadium: Estadio Riazor; Attendance: 26,177; Referee: Salvador Lax Franco

4 June 2022	Albacete	2–1	Rayo Majadahonda	Vigo
18:00 UTC+2	Jordi Sánchez 22'; Rubén Martínez 82'	Report	Néstor 68'	Stadium: Estadio de Balaídos; Attendance: 400; Referee: Mateo Busquets Ferrer

5 June 2022	Villarreal B	3–1	UD Logroñés	Ferrol
18:00 UTC+2	Del Moral 60'; De la Fuente 73'; Iosifov 90+4'	Report	Duba 42'	Stadium: Estadio da Malata; Attendance: 300; Referee: José Luis Guzmán Mansilla

5 June 2022	Racing de Ferrol	0–1	Gimnàstic	Vigo
18:00 UTC+2		Report	Jiménez 58'	Stadium: Estadio de Balaídos; Attendance: 5,000; Referee: Sergiu Claudiu Muresan Muresan

===== Finals =====
====== Qualified teams ======
Group	Position	Team
1	2nd	Deportivo La Coruña
2	2nd	Villarreal B

Group	Position	Team
2	3rd	Albacete

Group	Position	Team
2	4th	Gimnàstic

Team 1	Score	Team 2
Deportivo La Coruña	1–2 (a.e.t.)	Albacete
Villarreal B	2–0	Gimnàstic

11 June 2022	Deportivo La Coruña	1–2 (a.e.t.)	Albacete	A Coruña
18:00 UTC+2				Stadium: Estadio Riazor; Attendance: 27,215; Referee: Andrés Fuentes Molina

11 June 2022	Villarreal B	2–0	Gimnàstic	Vigo
21:00 UTC+2				Stadium: Estadio de Balaídos; Attendance: 2,023; Referee: Germán Cid Camacho

== Promoted teams ==
- The two teams that were promoted to Segunda División through regular season groups and the two play–off winners are included.

Promoted to Segunda División
FC Andorra (First time ever)	Racing Santander (2 years later)	Albacete (1 year later)	Villarreal B (10 years later)
