= Cedric Omoigui =

Nigerian footballer

Cedric
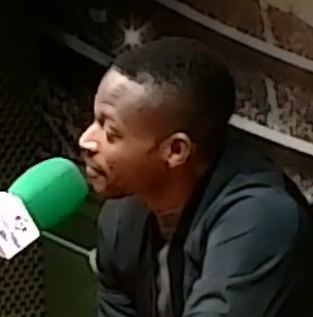
- Cedric in 2022

Personal information
- Full name: Cedric Omoigui
- Date of birth: 11 November 1994 (age 31)
- Place of birth: Benin City, Nigeria
- Height: 1.82 m (6 ft 0 in)
- Position: Forward

Team information
- Current team: Anagennisi Karditsa
- Number: 9

Youth career
- Villaverde Boetticher
- Pozuelo
- Real Madrid
- 2008–2013: Mallorca

Senior career*
Years	Team	Apps	(Gls)
2013–2017	Mallorca B	105	(52)
2014–2018	Mallorca	32	(1)
2015–2016	→ Valencia B (loan)	12	(1)
2018–2019	Fuenlabrada	25	(11)
2019–2020	Royal Excel Mouscron	7	(1)
2020–2024	Racing Santander	66	(25)
2023–2024	→ Ibiza (loan)	32	(5)
2024–2025	Fuenlabrada	35	(11)
2025–2026	Gimnàstic	35	(2)
2026–	Anagennisi Karditsa	0	(0)
- * Club domestic league appearances and goals as of 10 June 2026

Cedric Omoigui (born 11 November 1994), simply known as Cedric, is a Nigerian footballer who plays as a forward for Super League Greece 2 club Anagennisi Karditsa.

== Football career ==
Born in Benin City, Cedric moved to Spain in 1996, aged only two. He joined RCD Mallorca's youth setup in 2008, and made his senior debuts with the reserves in the 2013–14 campaign, scoring 28 goals in Tercera División.

On 14 December 2014 Cedric made his professional debut, replacing fellow youth graduate Abdón Prats in a 1–1 home draw against CD Numancia in the Segunda División championship. On 27 August of the following year he was loaned to another reserve team, Valencia CF Mestalla.

On 6 August 2018, free agent Cedric signed a one-year deal with CF Fuenlabrada in Segunda División B. One year later, he joined Belgian club Royal Excel Mouscron on a three-year contract.

Cedric returned to Spain and its third division on 2 October 2020, after agreeing to a two-year deal with Racing de Santander. He scored 16 goals overall during the 2021–22 season, helping his side to return to the second division after a two-year absence.

Cedric was sidelined for the first half of the 2022–23 campaign due to a back injury, but was only a backup option to Roko Baturina and Matheus Aiás on his return. On 29 August 2023, he was loaned to Primera Federación side UD Ibiza, for one year.

On 19 July 2024, Cedric terminated his contract with the Verdiblancos, and signed a three-year contract with CF Fuenlabrada four days later. On 18 July 2025, after suffering relegation, he agreed to a three-year deal with fellow third division side Gimnàstic de Tarragona.

On 1 August 2026, Cedric terminated his link with Nàstic.

On 20 August 2026, Cedric signed for Anagennisi Karditsa on a free transfer.
