= Lucas Díaz =

Spanish footballer (born 1996)

Personal information
- Full name: Lucas Díaz Parcero
- Date of birth: 10 May 1996 (age 30)
- Place of birth: Geneva, Switzerland
- Height: 1.88 m (6 ft 2 in)
- Position: Goalkeeper

Team information
- Current team: Racing Ferrol
- Number: 25

Youth career
- Compostela

Senior career*
Years	Team	Apps	(Gls)
2014–2018	Compostela	60	(0)
2015–2016	Estudiantil	13	(0)
2018–2019	Oviedo B	18	(0)
2019–2020	Racing B	17	(0)
2019–2022	Racing Santander	25	(0)
2022–2023	Atlético Baleares	28	(0)
2023–2024	Lugo	23	(0)
2024–2025	Fuenlabrada	38	(0)
2025–	Racing Ferrol	6	(0)
- * Club domestic league appearances and goals as of 9 June 2026

Lucas Díaz Parcero (born 10 May 1996) is a Spanish professional footballer who plays as a goalkeeper for Primera Federación club Racing Ferrol.

== Club career ==
Born in Geneva to Spanish parents, Díaz moved to Spain at early age and joined SD Compostela's youth setup. On 11 May 2014, aged only 18, he made his first team debut after coming on as a second-half substitute in a 0–2 Segunda División B away loss against UD Logroñés.

In 2015, after finishing his formation, Díaz was assigned to the farm team CFA Estudiantil in the regional leagues. The following year, he was definitely promoted to the main squad, now in the Tercera División, and became a regular starter.

On 10 July 2018, Díaz moved to Real Oviedo and was assigned to the reserves in the third division. On 19 July of the following year, he signed for another reserve team, Racing de Santander B in division four.

On 24 August 2019, as both Iván Crespo and Luca Zidane were injured, Díaz made his professional debut for Racing de Santander by starting in a 1–1 away draw against UD Almería in the Segunda División. On 28 August of the following year, after the club suffered relegation, he renewed his contract until 2022 and was definitely promoted to the main squad.

Díaz was a backup to Miquel Parera during the 2021–22 season as the club achieved promotion to the second division, and subsequently represented Primera Federación sides CD Atlético Baleares and CD Lugo.

On 28 July 2024, Díaz joined Fuenlabrada on a one-season deal.
