= Eduardo Docampo =

Spanish football manager (born 1974)

Personal information
- Full name: Eduardo Docampo Aldana
- Date of birth: 26 May 1974 (age 52)
- Place of birth: Bilbao, Spain

Team information
- Current team: South Korea (assistant manager)

Managerial career
- Years: Team
- 2007–2012: Athletic Bilbao (youth)
- 2012–2017: Rubin Kazan (youth)
- 2015–2017: Belarus (assistant)
- 2017–2018: Al Ahli SC (assistant)
- 2018–2019: Dynamo Kyiv (assistant)
- 2019: Rubin Kazan (assistant)
- 2020–2021: Ufa (assistant)
- 2021–2022: Calahorra
- 2022–2023: Cultural Leonesa
- 2024–2025: Sochi (assistant)
- 2026–: South Korea (assistant)

Eduardo Docampo Aldana (born 26 May 1974) is a Spanish football manager, currently the assistant manager of the South Korea national football team.

== Career ==
Born in Bilbao, Docampo began his coaching career at Athletic Bilbao in 2007, managing in several youth categories before taking over the Cadete B squad in July 2011. He also worked as an assistant of the Juvenil A team. On 12 June 2012, after five years at the Lions, he left the club to join FC Rubin Kazan along with compatriots Vicente Gómez and Pinedo.

During his five-year stay in Russia, Docampo managed the under-17 side of Kazan, also holding the position of Methodology Director; in 2015, he was also an assistant manager at the national team of Belarus, working under Aleksandr Khatskevich and Igor Kriushenko. In June 2017, he moved to Qatari side Al Ahli SC as an assistant of compatriot Joaquín Caparrós, and remained in the role with his successor, Jorge Peris.

In June 2018, Docampo rejoined Khatskevich's staff at FC Dynamo Kyiv. Roughly one year later, he returned to Russia and Rubin Kazan, after being named assistant manager to Roman Sharonov; on 16 December 2019, however, he left the club along with Sharonov. He remained in Russia's top flight as he was named assistant manager to Rashid Rakhimov at FC Ufa on 14 October 2020, but left the following April after the resignation of Rakhimov.

On 3 June 2021, Docampo returned to Spain after nine years away, being appointed manager of Primera Federación side CD Calahorra on a contract for the 2021–22 campaign. The following 1 June, after an 11th-place finish, he left the club after turning down a new deal.

On 16 June 2022, Docampo took over Cultural y Deportiva Leonesa also in the third division, but was dismissed on 26 April of the following year. On 14 January 2024, he returned to Russia after becoming Robert Moreno's assistant at PFC Sochi.

== Managerial statistics ==
As of 23 April 2023

Managerial record by team and tenure
Team	Nat	From	To	Record								Ref
Team	Nat	From	To	G	W	D	L	GF	GA	GD	Win %	Ref
Calahorra	(Spain)	3 June 2021	1 June 2022	39	14	11	14	49	44	+5	35.90	
Cultural Leonesa	(Spain)	16 June 2022	26 April 2023	33	11	8	14	36	38	−2	33.33	
Total				72	25	19	28	85	82	+3	34.72	—
