= Fernando Asuero =

Spanish doctor and footballer

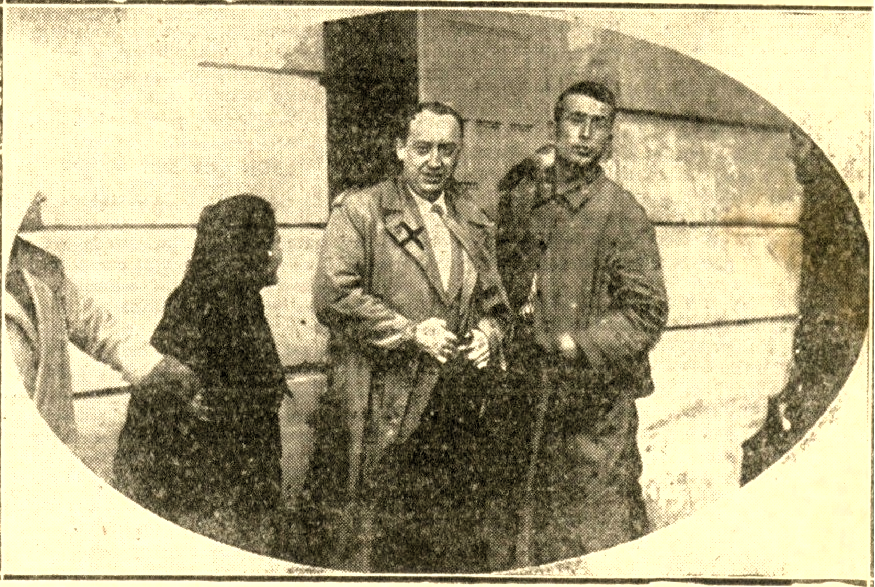
- Born: Fernando Asuero Sáenz de Cenzano; 29 May 1887; San Sebastián, Spain
- Died: 2 December 1942 (aged 55); San Sebastián, Spain
- Citizenship: Spanish
- Occupations: Physician; footballer
- Known for: Creator of asueroterapia
Association football career
- Position: Goalkeeper
Senior career*
Years	Team	Apps	(Gls)
1906	Athletic Club		
1906–1907	Bizcaya		
1907–1910	Athletic Club		
- * Club domestic league appearances and goals

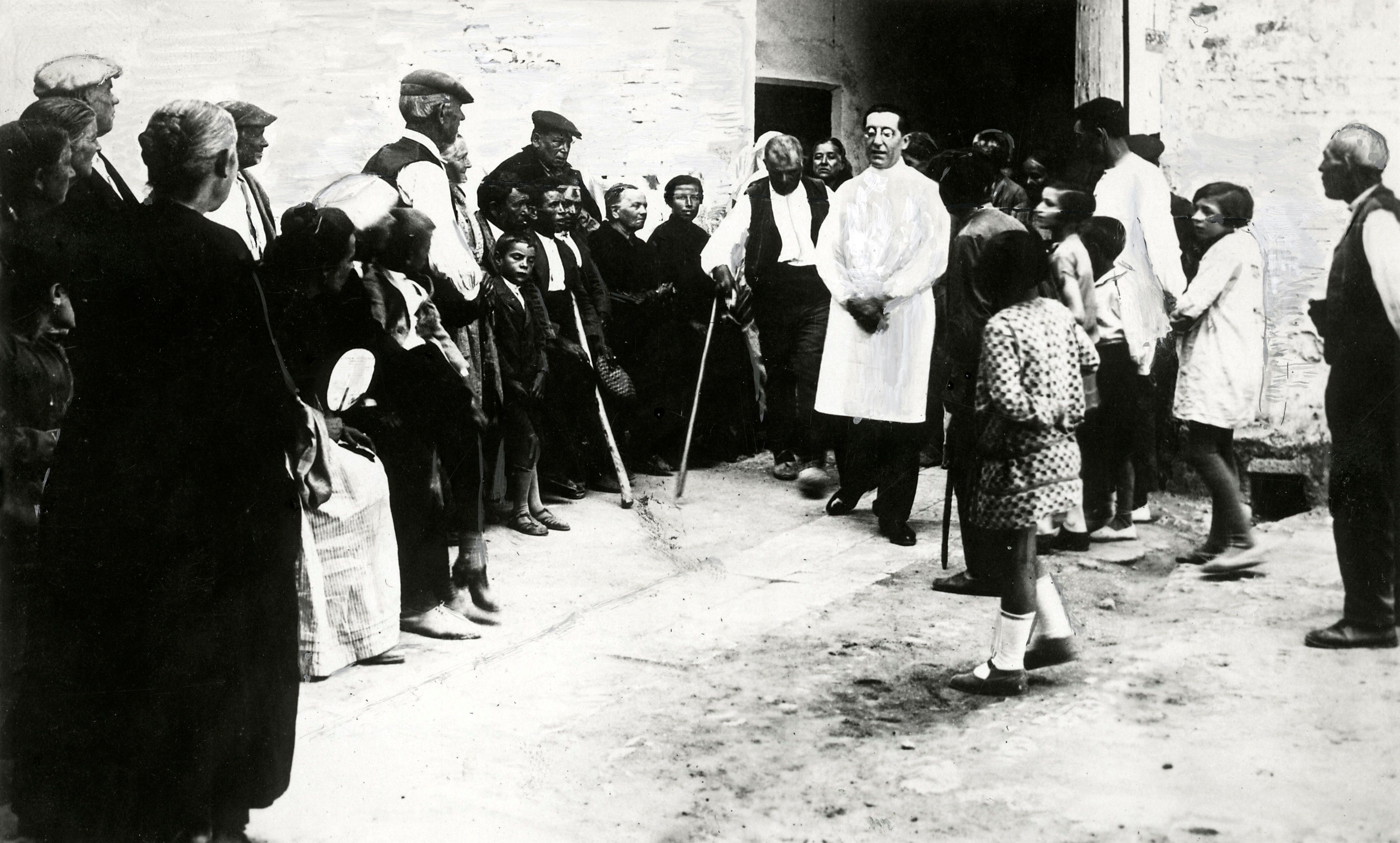
Asuero among many of his patients

Fernando Asuero Sáenz de Cenzano (29 May 1887 – 2 December 1942) was a Spanish footballer who played as a goalkeeper for Athletic Club, and a doctor, creator of the controversial asueroterapia, a dubious method applied by means of small cauterizations in the trigeminal nerve to cure several diseases.

== Education ==
He was born into a family of famous surgeons, at number 3 Miramar Street. His grandfather, Vicente Asuero, was a professor of General Therapeutics and physician to the king consort Francisco de Asís. He studied medicine at the Universidad de Madrid and specialized in otorhinolaryngology. He selected throat, nose, and ear as his specialty. Later, he went to Paris to deepen his studies and knowledge at the clinic of Dr. Lubet Barbon. He also studied at the University of Cambridge.

== Playing career ==
Between 1906 and 1910, he played several matches with Athletic Club, where he held the position of goalkeeper. In 1907, the best players from Athletic and Unión Vizcaino came together to form Bizcaya, which was specially created to take part in the 1907 Copa del Rey, and Asuero was elected into the team, making his competitive debut in the 1907 Copa del Rey Final, which ended in a 0–1 loss to Madrid FC (now Real Madrid), courtesy of a late goal from Manuel Prast. Three years later, he was a member of the Athletic side that won the 1910 Copa del Rey (UECF), although he did not play in the final, where his replacement, Luis Astorquia, kept a clean-sheet a 1–0 win over Vasconia, the name under which the newly founded Real Sociedad played. He was the starting goalkeeper on 9 January 1910, at the premiere of the red and white shirt by Athletic Club, although as a goalkeeper, he wore a different shirt.

Prior to starting his own practice in the center of the city when he returned to San Sebastián, he worked in a number of clinics. He quickly became known among the citizens due to his excellent personal treatment and his social commitment, which would lead him to act as a councilor in the city council of San Sebastián between 1923 and 1925. One of his best-known hobbies was reading about what at that time was called "occult sciences", being interested in those issues that are difficult to explain by science.

== Asueroterapia ==
Around 1929, Asuero promoted a controversial method of curing various diseases through small cauterizations in the nasal mucosa (trigeminum), which made him a world celebrity at the time. Apparently, through the action of heat on the nerves of the nose, without any pain, he cured ailments of many kinds: asthma, epilepsy, venous ulcer, deafness, blindness and paralysis. He defended his method in an article called Ahora hablo yo, y en algunos folletos (English: Now I speak, and in some pamphlets), highlighting its effectiveness with a few appointments being enough, and sometimes just a few minutes rather than many sessions or long operations and painful processes. The news spread quickly, appearing on the front pages of some national newspapers such as El Pueblo Vasco, El Sol and La Voz and five-column articles were written about his method. Journalists flocked to Dr. Asuero's office to interview him about his method and verify the veracity of the supposed cures, but he refused to speak. However, thanks to the testimonies of several already healed patients, they managed to find out that it consisted of the cauterizations of various nasal nerves, mainly the trigeminal.

Cases soon came to light such as that of Benito Jovarri, an invalid for more than 20 years who, after going to Dr. Asuero, walked out on his own feet; the one from Bienvenido Sanz, who suffered from severe oral paralysis from which he was cured after the intervention; or that of the civil guard Alberto Sánchez, who recovered from his disability in the first session. These cases did nothing but increase the arrival of patients to the city. People flocked to his office in large numbers and the surrounding hotels filled up, and such was the avalanche that the consultation had to be moved to the nearby Hotel Príncipe, where Asuero occupied three rooms.

Asuero's fame culminated when Nemesio Manuel Sobrevila, a film director from Bilbao, premiered the film Las maravillosas curas del doctor Asuero (English: The wonderful cures of Doctor Asuero). The film was banned, which only increased the interest and mystery around his method. His spell as a councilor in San Sebastián between 1923 and 1925 only made the controversy even more infamous and "Asurotherapy" was taken beyond the realm of science. The controversy reached several fields of literature (El cuadrigémino, written by Muñoz Seca y Perez Fernandez, 1929), popular culture and science, so the medical associations also spawned this controversy. Most of the media, however, opted for fierce criticism and ridicule.

The critical attitude of the media was increasing, and some branded him a "scientific fraud". Santiago Ramón y Cajal himself considered this technique "unscientific". However, doctors of various origins began to copy Asuero's therapy, not only in Spain, but also in France, Italy, Argentina, Mexico, Cuba and Portugal, among others. In the Rioja town of Cihuri, where Asuero had lived part of his childhood and owned a family farm, the neighbors honored him by naming one of the streets after him. On 30 May 1929, on Asuero's birthday, more than 30,000 people from San Sebastián gathered around his house with the sole intention of seeing and greeting him. The philosopher Henri Bergson also went to the doctor's office with a nephew of his.

== In popular culture ==
A blind man's song entitled El doctor Asuero collected in the Joaquín Díaz Foundation collection and recorded in 1983 with performers from Portillo, Valladolid

After his stay in Buenos Aires, Manuel Colominas wrote the tango Operáte el trigémino, recorded by the Minotto di Cicco orchestra and with the voice of Antonio Buglione. Later came the play Nena, tócame el trigémino. The Cuban singer Miguel Matamoros composed the song El paralítico since, in his opinion, "in 1930 in Cuba nothing was talked about other than the ability of the doctor Fernando Asuero to cure paralysis".

== Images ==
The crowd gathered to greet Dr. Fernando Asuero, next to his house, Calle Loyola in San Sebastián (Gipuzkoa), in 1929.

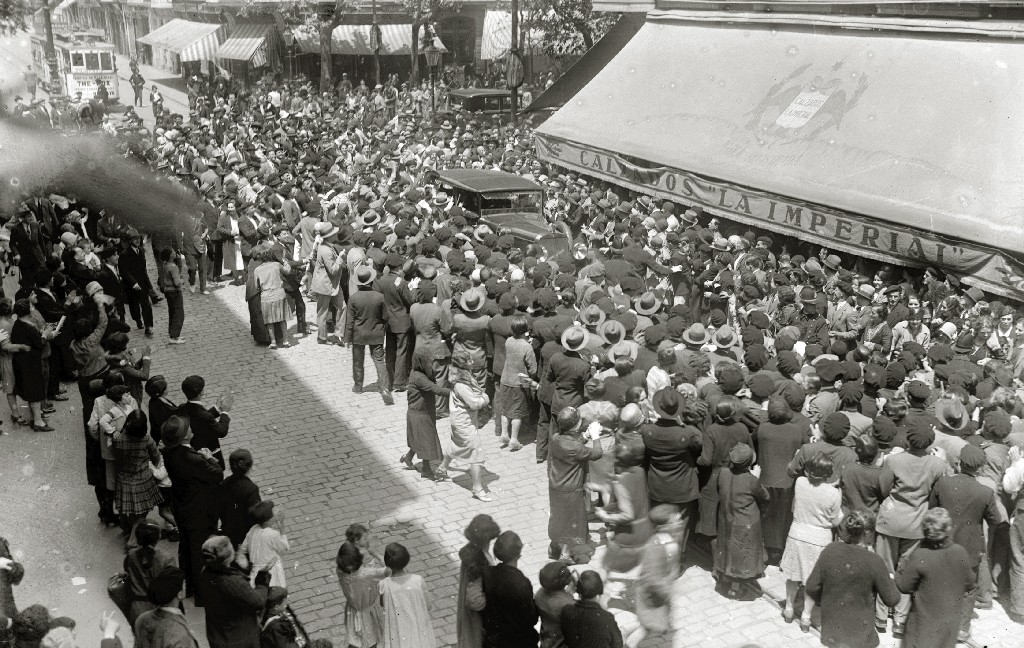

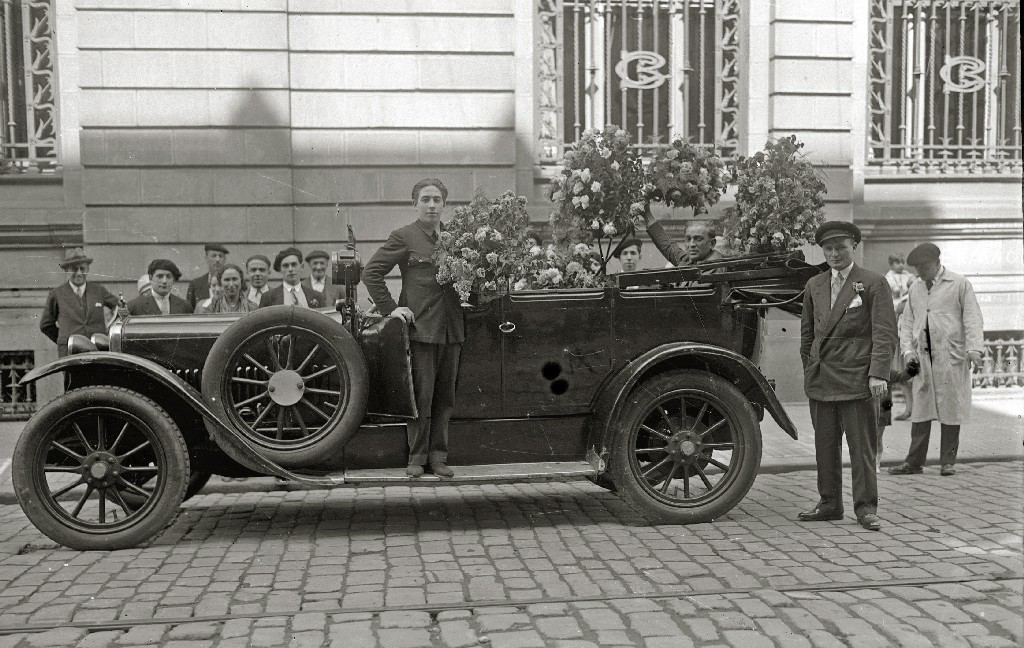

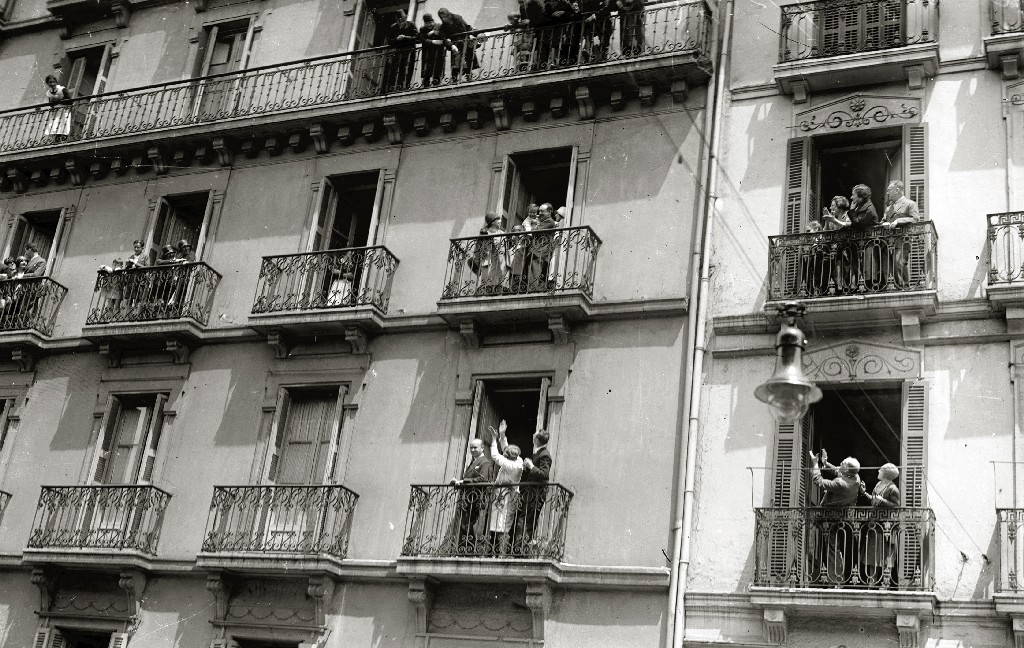

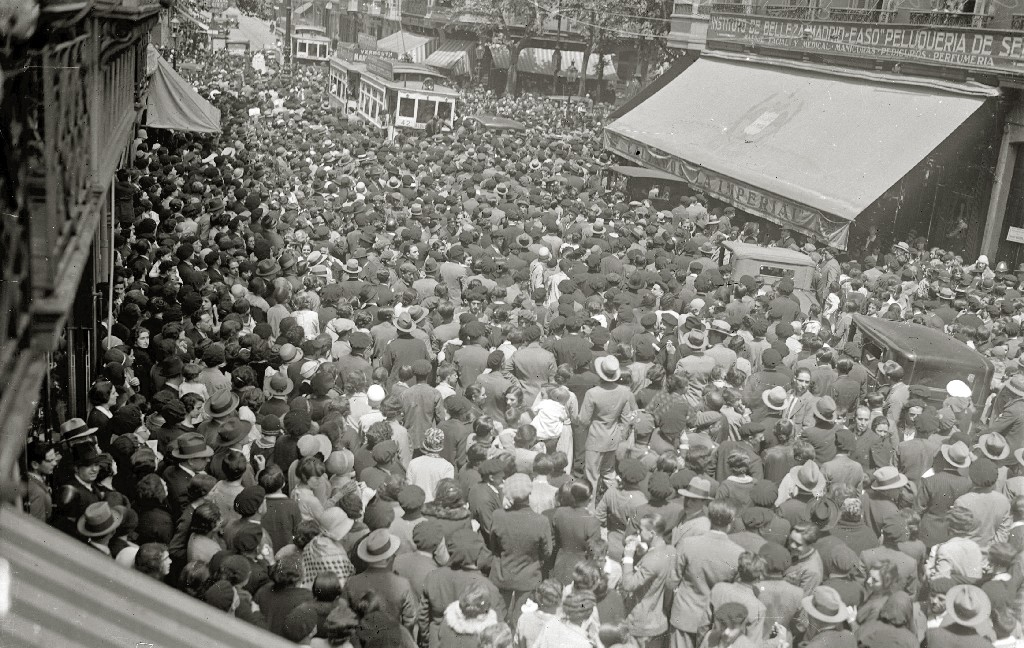

== Death ==
He died in San Sebastián on 2 December 1942, at the age of 55.

== Honours ==
Athletic Bilbao

  - Champion: 1910
  - Runner-up: 1907 (Note: as Club Bizcaya.)
