= Vicente Asuero y Cortázar =

Spanish physician and professor (1806–1873)

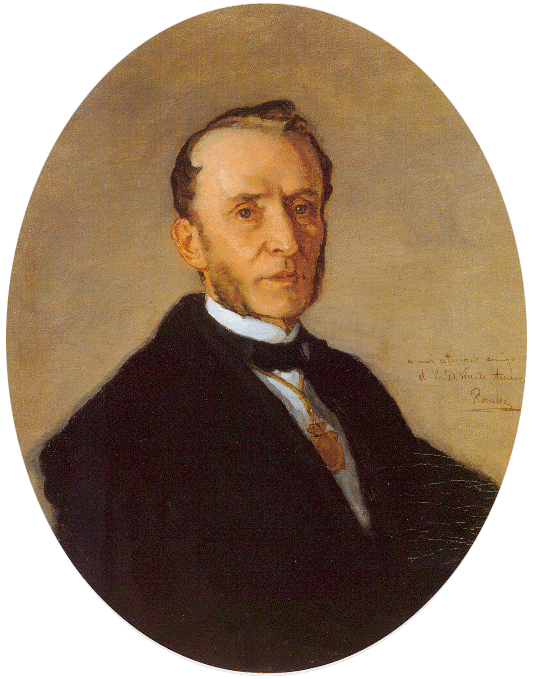
- Portrait by Eduardo Rosales (1871)
- Born: October 27, 1806; Nájera, Spain
- Died: February 23, 1873 (aged 66); Madrid, Spain
- Resting place: Sacramental de San Ginés y San Luis
- Education: St. Anthony Pious School in Madrid Royal Academy of Fine Arts of San Fernando Colegio de Cirugía de San Carlos
- Occupations: Medical doctor, professor
- Employer: Central University of Madrid
- Organization(s): Royal Academy of Exact, Physical and Natural Sciences Royal Academy of Medicine and Surgery of New Castile Royal National Academy of Medicine
- Honours: Order of Beneficence (1856) Civil Order of Maria Victoria (1872)

Vicente Casto Asuero y Sáez de Cortázar (Note: According to Fermín Caballero, the true surname of the mother is Sáez, but it sometimes appears written as Sáenz. The latter is the variant that appears in the Diccionario biográfico español.) (October 27, 1806 – February 23, 1873) was a Spanish medical doctor, professor at the Central University and court physician to Isabella II of Spain. He was also a member of the Consejo de Sanidad de España and of several scientific societies, such as the Royal National Academy of Medicine, of which he was elected president, although he resigned a few days later. Known for his lectures against homeopathy and his contributions to medical hydrology, he has been described as "the foremost Spanish physician of his time", as attested by the physician and historian Eduardo García del Real.

== Early life and education ==
He was born on 27 October 1806 (Note: This is the date given by Fermín Caballero, Valentín Matilla Gómez and the Diccionario biográfico español, but according to Luis Comenge y Ferrer and the biography published by Federico Lletget in El Siglo Médico it was the same day in 1807.) in Nájera (La Rioja), son of the surgeon Ángel Antonio Asuero y Guinea and Victoria Sáez de Cortázar and the youngest of six siblings. Two days after birth he was baptized in the parish of Santa Cruz in his hometown. He began his primary studies in Torrecilla en Cameros (La Rioja), where his family had moved. At the age of ten he moved to Madrid with his brother José, a physician, (Note: His uncle according to Federico Lletget.) and attended the St. Anthony Pious School for two courses, where he learned Humanities and Philosophy. During 1818 and 1819 he resided intermittently in Alcalá de Henares with his brother Cosme and combined his studies at the Escuelas Pías with the Royal Academy of Fine Arts of San Fernando, which he attended at night. The following years he studied at the Royal Studies of Saint Isidore along with other illustrious men of his time such as Mariano José de Larra, Juan Eugenio Hartzenbusch, Segundo Sierra Pambley or Salustiano Olózaga.

The Doctor Asuero had average stature, five feet and one inch, blond hair and complexion, expressive and gentle physiognomy, refined manners, and a dignified and respectable posture.

— Fermín Caballero

Due to the political tendencies of his family, he moved with his brothers Zenón and Cosme, both military, to Seville and Cádiz, where the constitutional government had moved at the end of the Liberal Triennium, and temporarily interrupted his studies. He returned to the capital in 1823 and settled in the house of an elderly lady, since his relatives had to go into exile to La Rioja. He then learned Physics and Mathematics at the Estudios de San Isidro and obtained the bachelor's degree in Philosophy on 3 October 1825. The following year he studied Botany at the Real Jardín Botánico, but finally enrolled in Medicine at the Royal College of Surgery of San Carlos. With outstanding grades in all subjects, he graduated as bachelor in medicine and surgery on 19 September 1831 and obtained the licentiate on 20 May 1833. As help to complete his studies, he had from 17 April 1828 to September 1832 an internal scholarship in the infirmaries of the institution.

== Medical career ==
Between 1836 and 1837 he lived in Paris with the aim of increasing his medical knowledge. Before leaving, on 18 April 1836 he signed a will in favor of his fiancée, Facunda Villaescusa, whose hand he had formally requested on 27 November 1834. He married on 24 May 1837, after his return to Spain, after twelve years of courtship. They had three children: Facunda, born in 1838; Vicente, in 1840, and Ángel, in 1845. (Note: The second of them also became a Doctor of Medicine and, to avoid confusion by having the same name, once grown the son added "y Cortázar" to his usual signature, "Vicente Asuero".) In his home up to ten people lived, as he took in the children of his brothers José and Zenón when they died and also Bárbara, a widowed sister of his, and her daughter.

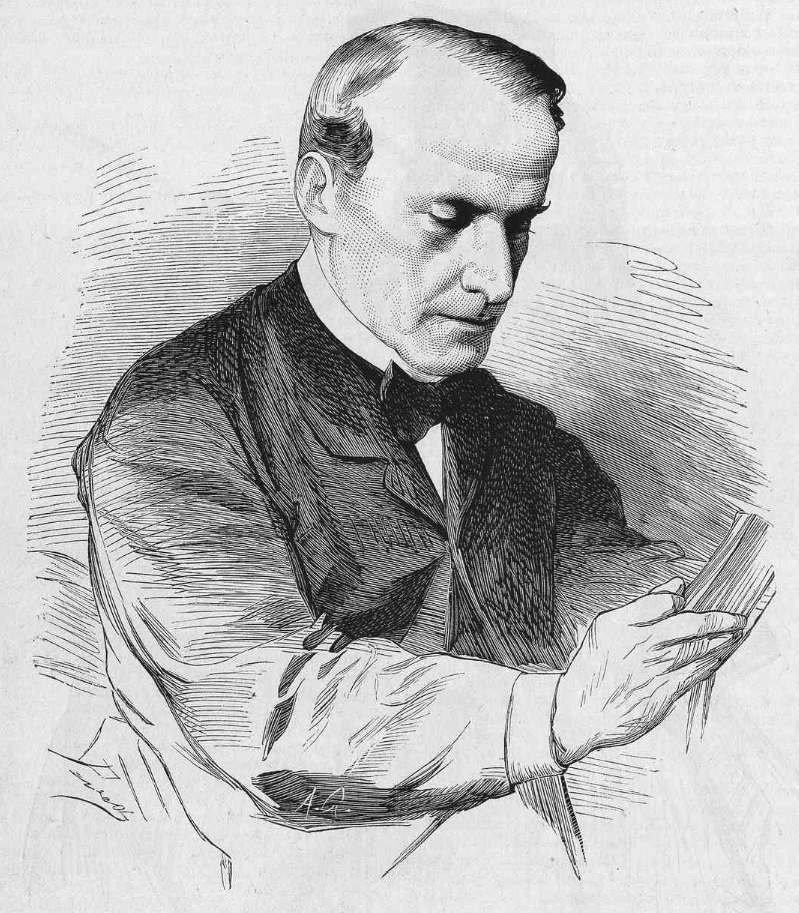
Engraving of Asuero y Cortázar, work of Daniel Perea, published in La Ilustración Española y Americana (1873).

He joined as a full member of the Royal Academy of Exact, Physical and Natural Sciences on 16 November 1838 and of the Academy of Medicine and Surgery of the same city on 16 December of the following year. (Note: After the reform of the regime and statutes of the institution and the name change to "Academia de Medicina y Cirugía de Castilla la Nueva", he was granted the title of numerary on 1 October 1947.) According to Enrique Salcedo Ginestal, at the request of Pedro Mata y Fontanet the Minister of the Interior, Fermín Caballero, granted Asuero the position of professor of Medical Morals, History and Bibliography at the University of Madrid on 20 October 1843, a position in which Anastasio Chinchilla was also interested. A few days after taking the chair he exchanged it for that of general and descriptive anatomy. Three years later, on 1 June 1846, he obtained the title of doctor. During his twenty-five years as a professor he taught two courses of Anatomy; one of Physiology; another of a new subject, created in 1867, called "Extension to therapeutics, pharmacology and medical hydrology", and the rest of Therapeutics.

During the 1840s, homeopathy gained popularity in Spain to the point that in 1850 a royal order provided for the creation of a provisional chair for the teaching of this pseudoscience, although it ultimately did not take effect. Some publications and university professors, including Pedro Mata and Tomás de Corral y Oña, Marquis of San Gregorio, opposed the new doctrine. In this context, Asuero, then professor of Therapeutics, gave nine lectures impugning homeopathy between 4 and 12 April 1850 which he later tried to publish reducing the number to five under the title Lecciones sobre los fundamentos de la terapéutica sustitutiva u homeopática. Only the first was printed, in 1850.

He was a member of the Consejo de Sanidad del Reino from 1847 to 1855, in addition to holding the same position between 1849 and 1852 in the Junta Provincial de Beneficencia of Madrid, for which he prepared various reports and the project, report and budget for the establishment of the Leganés psychiatric hospital. On the other hand, on 10 January 1856 he began working at the Hospital de San Pedro de los Naturales in Madrid (Note: At that time located on Calle de la Torrecilla del Leal, but in 1902 it moved to Calle de San Bernardo.) to fill the vacancy due to the death of Sebastián Olea, his brother-in-law and former companion at the Colegio de San Carlos. Years later he was replaced by his son Vicente in this position. On 1 January 1862, Asuero was appointed consulting physician to the Royal Chamber through the intercession of Corral y Oña, who was the first court physician and sought to surround himself with people hostile to homeopathy to undermine its influence in the palace. He received 30,000 Spanish reals annually and once attended the consort king, Francisco de Asís de Borbón, in addition to having been present at the birth of Infanta Eulalia.

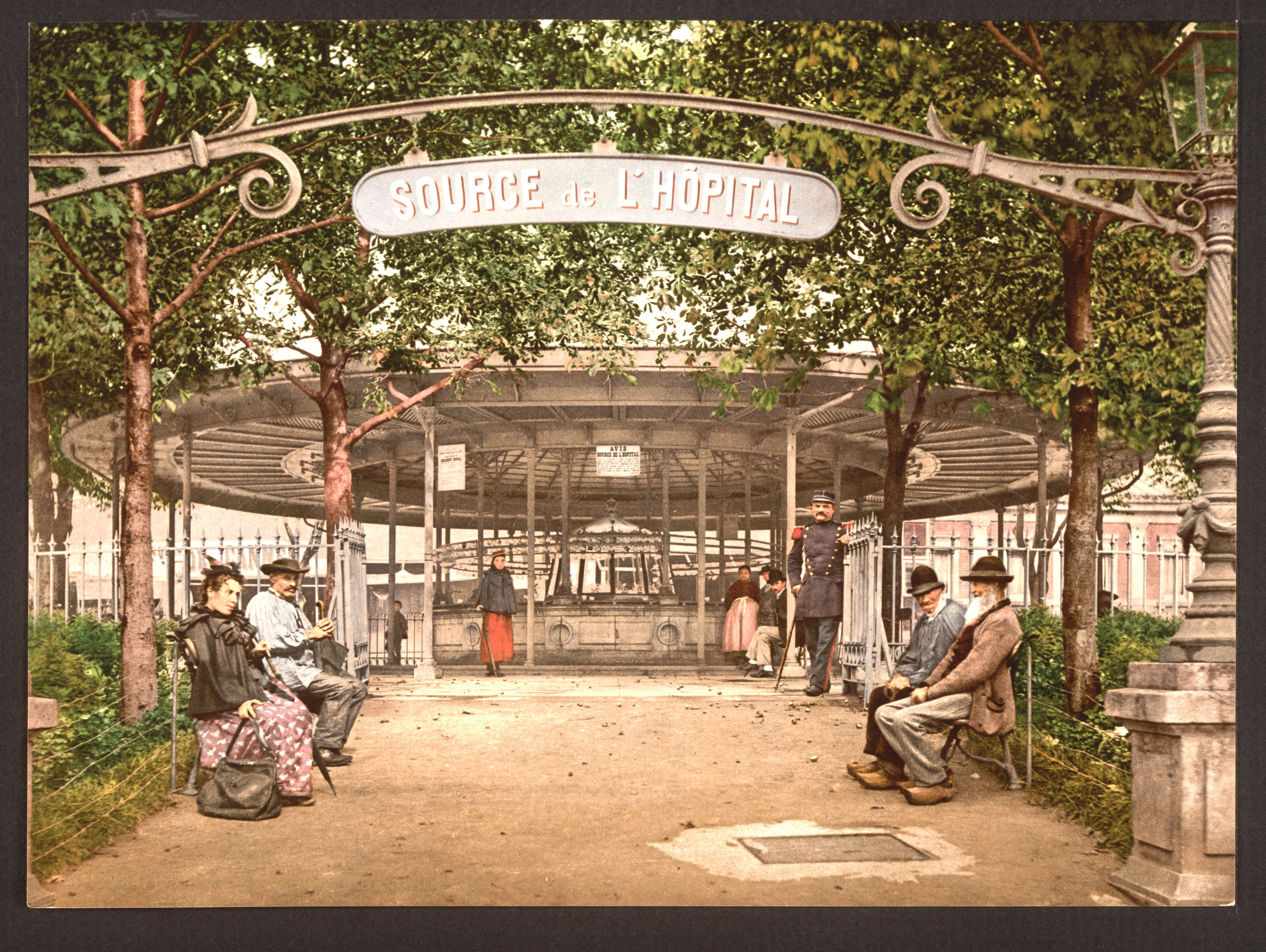
l'Hôpital spring in Vichy (France), city to which Asuero traveled on several occasions.

Asuero requested his retirement as a professor shortly before the Revolution of 1868 to the Minister of Development Severo Catalina, but it was not granted until 10 April 1869 by the provisional government, with an allocation of 16,800 reales. Later, he was elected president of the Royal National Academy of Medicine by twenty-two votes against two on 14 January 1871; however, he submitted his resignation for health reasons at the next meeting, on 1 February, and it became effective on the 6th. (Note: Fermín Caballero states that he also rejected the presidency in 1858 after being elected.) In addition to the first class cross of the Order of Civil Beneficence, which was awarded to him on 5 October 1856 for his services against cholera, in April 1872 he was granted the grand cross of the Order of Civil Merit of María Victoria, (Note: At the same time as Matías Nieto y Serrano, Agustín Pascual and Joaquín Núñez de Prado.) which Asuero initially rejected out of loyalty to Isabella II of Spain and finally requested again a week before his death, once the reign of Amadeo I of Spain had ended, because according to Fermín Caballero "he did not want his name to appear among those who had shown him slights or disdain [to Queen Maria Victoria]". He died at the age of sixty-six on 23 February 1873 (Note: Again according to Fermín Caballero, Valentín Matilla and the Diccionario biográfico español. Comenge y Ferrer and Federico Lletget give as the date the following day, 24 February.) after a short illness, a "cerebral congestion" according to the doctors of the time, in his house on Calle de Alcalá in Madrid. He was buried together with his wife Facunda, who had died in 1854, in the Sacramental de San Ginés y San Luis.

In life three oil painting portraits were made of him, all half-length, by Antonio Gómez Cros, Federico Madrazo and Eduardo Rosales. Of the latter, a lithographic copy also survives the work of José Cebrián. His health was not good, he suffered from chronic gastralgia, attacks of hemoptysis that put him in danger on some occasion and small cerebral hemorrhages. This did not prevent him from making numerous trips both nationally and abroad throughout his adult life. Within Spain he went to Barajas de Melo — birthplace of Fermín Caballero —, Asturias, Andalusia and to the Monasterio de Piedra (province of Zaragoza). Of the latter, the summer stays in Paris stand out, from where he also made expeditions to Switzerland, the west of Germany, England and Vichy, a city whose springs he attributed the ability to improve his gastric disease. In the French capital he frequented museums, hospitals and summer chairs. With the objects collected on these trips he formed a therapeutic museum attached to his chair whose creation he requested from the rector in May 1861.

== Works ==
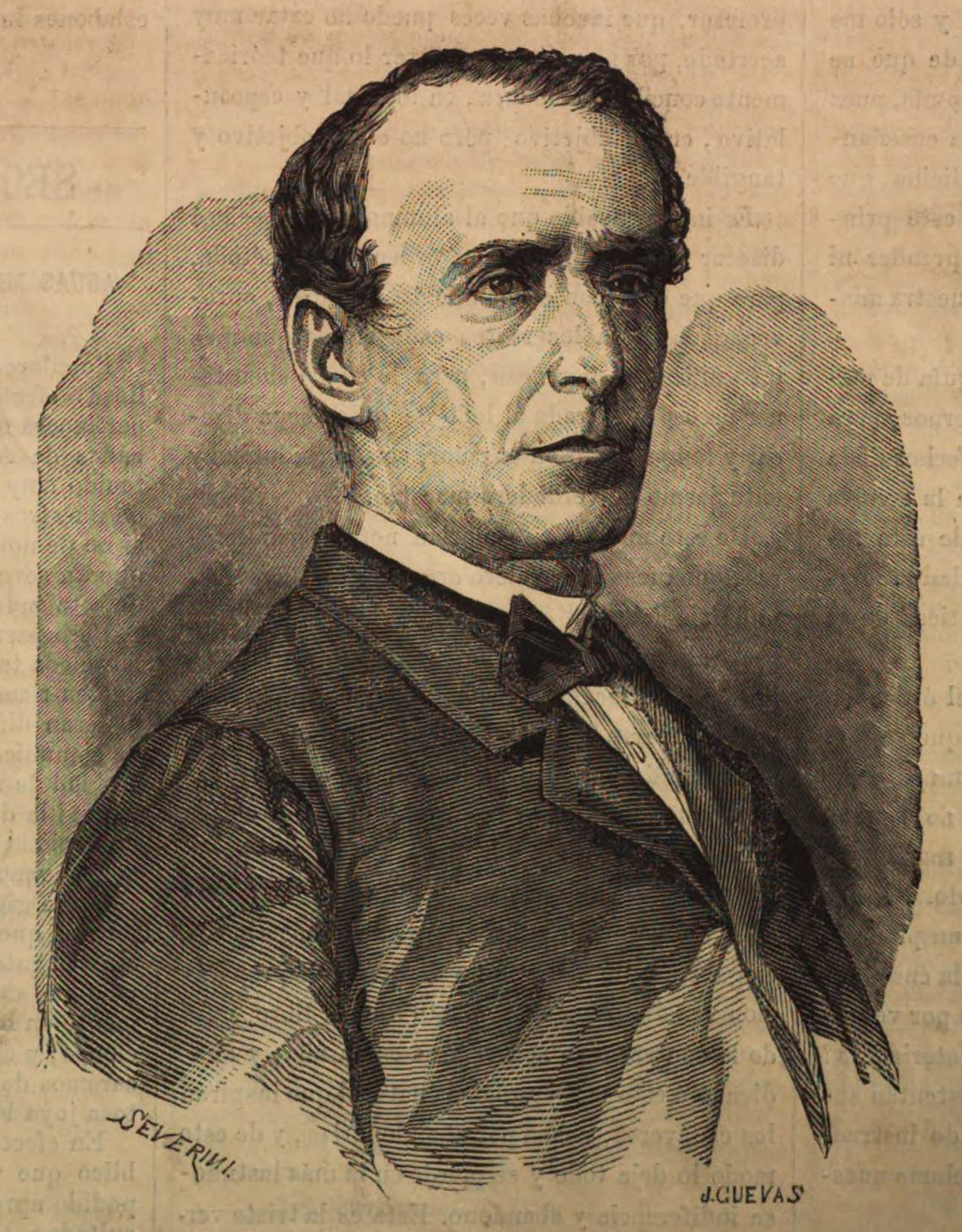
Engraving by José Severini and José Fernández Cuevas published in El Anfiteatro Anatómico Español (1873).

Fermín Caballero said that "the writings attributable to the pen of Doctor Asuero are not many nor long" and Eduardo García del Real that "like most Spanish physicians, he wrote little". In addition to the first of the Lecciones sobre los fundamentos de la terapéutica sustitutiva u homeopática (1850), he has three other works published during his lifetime called Discurso pronunciado en la solemne apertura de las sesiones del año 1854 en la Real Academia de Medicina de Madrid (1854), with the motto ¡Qué de cosas en una ley!; Discurso pronunciado en la solemne inauguracion del año académico de 1855 á 1856 en la Universidad Central (1855), on the theme Aptitud para el estudio de las ciencias y artes, and Programa de ampliacion de la Terapéutica é hidrologia médica (1868), of which only the part corresponding to the extension of Therapeutics was published.

In addition, a Discurso sobre el garrotillo and another Discurso sobre el cólera that he delivered at the Real Academia de Medicina were stenographically recorded and published in the magazine El Siglo Médico. He also left some manuscript works entitled Memoria sobre la Frenología, in which he defends that pseudoscience; Memoria sobre el cáncer; Memoria sobre los instintos; Devanadera de Asuero para la madeja de Moron, on the supposed madness of Fermín Gonzalo Morón; Historia de la última enfermedad del general D. Ramón María Narváez, Duke of Valencia; El doctor Manrique enfermo, asistido por el Doctor Asuero; Bases de la Terapéutica, of which Caballero says that it is a prologue or preparation to the Memoria sobre los instintos, and Estudio del hierro y de los medicamentos alterantes.

On the other hand, Asuero made a map of bathhouses of the Iberian Peninsula and the French Pyrenees in which he noted the name, water temperature and classification according to medical hydrology of each one. The correspondence he maintained with Gertrudis Gómez de Avellaneda and that both he and his wife exchanged with Concepción Arenal is also preserved.

== Notes ==
Parts of this article include text from Biografía del doctor don Vicente Asuero y Cortázar (1873), a work by Fermín Caballero (1800-1876) in the public domain.
