= Fermín Caballero =

Spanish politician, writer and journalist

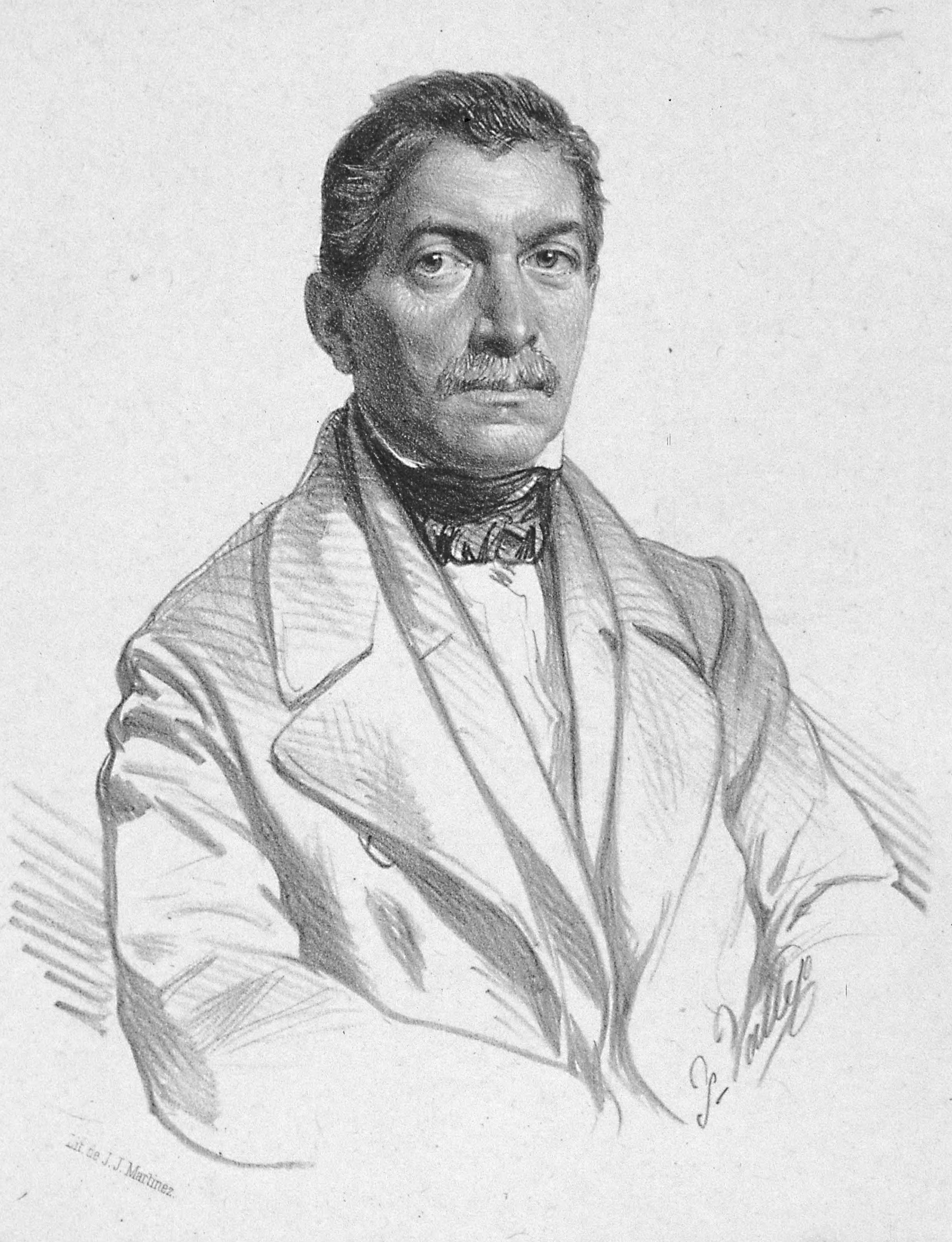

Personal details
- Born: 7 July 1800 Barajas de Melo, Spain
- Died: 17 June 1876 (aged 75 ) Madrid
- Party: Progressive Party

Fermín Caballero y Morgáez (July 7, 1800 – June 17, 1876) was a Spanish geographer, journalist, writer, and liberal politician.

== Works ==
- La Turquía, teatro de la guerra (1826)
- Mapa exacto de la guerra de Turquía (1828)
- Corrección fraterna al presbítero doctor don Sebastián Miñano, autor de un Diccionario geográfico estadístico de España y Portugal (1828)
- La Turquía victoriosa (1829)
- Cuadro político de las cinco partes del mundo (1829)
- Añadurías a la corrección fraterna (1830)
- El dique contra el torrente (1830)
- La cordobada (1830)
- Noticias sobre Turquía (1830)
- Apuntamiento de historia (1831)
- Nomenclatura Geográfica de España. Análisis gramatical y filosófico de los nombres de pueblos y lugares de la península, con aplicación a la topografía y la historia, Madrid, Imprenta de D. Eusebio Aguado, 1834.
- Epítome y vocabulario de botánica (1834)
- Manual de lengua inglesa (1834)
- lnterrogatorio para la descripción de los pueblos (1834)
- Las máximas de agricultura para los labradores de Barajas (1836)
- Fisonomía de los procuradores a Cortes (1836)
- El Gobierno y las Cortes del Estatuto (1837)
- Fermín Caballero a sus detractores (1837)
- Voz de alerta a los españoles constitucionales (1839)
- Casamiento de doña María Cristina con don Fernando Muñoz (1840)
- Manual de Geografía (1843).
- Manual geográfico-administrativo de la monarquía española Madrid: Imp. Antonio Yenes, 1844.
- Sinopsis geográfica, o toda la Geografía en un cuadro, 1848.
- Fomento de la población rural Madrid: Imprenta Nacional, 1864. 2.ª ed. Memoria premiada por la Academia de Ciencias morales y políticas, en el concurso de 1863. Segunda edición adicionada, Madrid, Imprenta y Librería de D. E. Aguado, 1863. Traducida al portugués en 1872. Hay edición moderna: Barcelona, El Albir, 1980.
- Reseña geográfica de España para la Exposición de París (1867)
- La imprenta en Cuenca. Datos para la historia del Arte Tipográfico en España. Cuenca, Imp. de El Eco, 1869.
- Noticias del doctor Don Nicolás Herrero (1868)
- "Proyecto de división territorial de España para todos los ramos del servicio" (1871)
- Pericia geográfica de Miguel de Cervantes Saavedra, demostrada en la historia de D. Quijote de la Mancha Madrid: Imprenta de Yenes, 1840.
- Conquenses ilustres (Abate Hervás, Melchor Cano, Doctor Montalvo, Alonso y Juan de Valdés). Madrid: Colegio Nacional de Sordo Mudos y Ciegos, I, Noticias biográficas y bibliográficas del Abate d. Lorenzo Hervás y Panduro: 1868; II, Vida del Illmo. Melchor Cano: 1871; III, Doctor Montalvo: 1873; IV, Alonso y Juan de Valdés: 1875 (4 vols.).
