= 2021–22 Primera División RFEF =

Primera División RFEF
- Season: 2021–22
- Dates: 27 August 2021 – 28 May 2022
- Champions: Racing Santander (1st title)
- Promoted: Racing Santander; Andorra; Albacete; Villarreal B
- Relegated: Atlético Sanluqueño; Betis Deportivo; Costa Brava; Extremadura UD (expelled); Internacional (resigned due economic problem); Sevilla Atlético; Tudelano; UCAM Murcia; Valladolid Promesas; Zamora
- Top goalscorer: Ferran Jutglà (19 goals)
- Biggest home win: Andorra 7–1 Linense (5 December 2021)
- Biggest away win: San Sebástian de los Reyes 0–7 Celta Vigo B (22 January 2022)
- Highest scoring: Andorra 7–1 Linense (5 December 2021)
- Highest attendance: 27,215; Deportivo La Coruña 1–2 Albacete (11 June 2022)

The 2021–22 Primera División RFEF season was the first and the only season under the name Primera División RFEF, the new third highest level in the Spanish football league system. It succeeded the old Segunda División B, which renamed itself Segunda División RFEF and downgraded to the fourth level in the pyramid. Forty teams participated, divided into two groups of twenty clubs each based on geographical proximity. In each group, the champions automatically promoted to Segunda División and the second to fifth placers played promotion play-offs and the bottom five were relegated to the Segunda División RFEF.

== Overview before the season ==
A total of 40 teams joined the league, including four relegated from the 2020–21 Segunda División and 36 promoted from the 2020–21 Segunda División B.

Teams relegated from Segunda División

- Albacete
- Castellón
- UD Logroñés
- Sabadell

Teams promoted from Segunda División B

- Alcoyano
- Algeciras
- Andorra
- Athletic Bilbao B
- Atlético Baleares
- Atlético Sanluqueño
- Badajoz
- Barcelona B
- Betis Deportivo
- Calahorra
- Celta Vigo B
- Cornellà
- Costa Brava (formerly Llagostera)
- Cultural Leonesa
- Deportivo La Coruña
- Extremadura
- Gimnàstic
- Internacional
- Linares
- Linense
- Racing Ferrol
- Racing Santander
- Rayo Majadahonda
- Real Madrid Castilla
- Real Unión
- San Fernando
- San Sebastián de los Reyes
- SD Logroñés
- Sevilla Atlético
- Talavera de la Reina
- Tudelano
- UCAM Murcia
- Unionistas
- Valladolid Promesas
- Villarreal B
- Zamora

== Groups ==
=== Group 1 (North West) ===
Location of teams in 2021–22 Primera División RFEF – Group 1

==== Teams and locations ====
| Team | Home city | Stadium | Capacity |
|---|---|---|---|
| Athletic Bilbao B | Bilbao | Lezama | 3,250 |
| Badajoz | Badajoz | Nuevo Vivero | 15,198 |
| Calahorra | Calahorra | La Planilla | 4,500 |
| Celta Vigo B | Vigo | Barreiro | 4,500 |
| Cultural Leonesa | León | Reino de León | 13,346 |
| Deportivo La Coruña | A Coruña | Abanca-Riazor | 32,660 |
| Extremadura | Almendralejo | Ciudad de Almendralejo | 11,580 |
| Internacional | Villaviciosa de Odón | Municipal de Villaviciosa | 3,000 |
| Racing Ferrol | Ferrol | A Malata | 12,043 |
| Racing Santander | Santander | El Sardinero | 22,222 |
| Rayo Majadahonda | Majadahonda | Cerro del Espino | 3,800 |
| Real Unión | Irun | Stadium Gal | 5,000 |
| SD Logroñés | Logroño | Mundial 82 | 1,275 |
| San Sebastián de los Reyes | San Sebastián de los Reyes | Matapiñonera | 3,000 |
| Talavera de la Reina | Talavera de la Reina | El Prado | 5,000 |
| Tudelano | Tudela | Ciudad de Tudela | 11,000 |
| Unionistas | Salamanca | Reina Sofía | 5,000 |
| UD Logroñés | Logroño | Las Gaunas | 16,000 |
| Valladolid Promesas | Valladolid | Anexos José Zorrilla | 1,500 |
| Zamora | Zamora | Ruta de la Plata | 7,813 |

==== Personnel and sponsorship ====
| Team | Manager | Captain | Kit manufacturer | Shirt main sponsor |
|---|---|---|---|---|
| Athletic Bilbao B | (Spain) Patxi Salinas | (Spain) Jon Sillero | New Balance | Kutxabank |
| Badajoz | (Spain) Isaac Jové | (Portugal) Adilson Mendes | Adidas | Derby Carburantes |
| Calahorra | (Spain) Eduardo Docampo | (Spain) Cristian Fernández | Luanvi | Bodegas Marqués del Atrio |
| Celta B | (Spain) Onésimo Sánchez | (Spain) Diego Pampín | Adidas | |
| Cultural Leonesa | (Spain) Curro Torres | (Spain) Julen Castañeda | Kappa | Aspire Academy |
| Deportivo La Coruña | (Spain) Borja Jiménez | (Spain) Álex Bergantiños | Kappa | Estrella Galicia |
| Extremadura | N/A | | Kappa | Destilerías Espronceda |
| Internacional | (Spain) Alfredo Santaelena | (Spain) Álvaro Herrero | Adidas | |
| Racing Ferrol | (Spain) Cristóbal Parralo | (Spain) Joselu | Lotto | Reganosa |
| Racing Santander | (Spain) Guillermo Fernández Romo | (Spain) Íñigo Sainz-Maza | Puma | Aldro Energía |
| Rayo Majadahonda | (Spain) Abel Gómez | (Spain) Néstor Susaeta | Nike | Afar 4 |
| Real Unión | (Spain) Aitor Zulaika | (Spain) Txusta | Zebra | BM Supermercados |
| San Sebastián de los Reyes | (Spain) Lobo | (Spain) Fer Ruiz | Nike | Tecnitasa |
| SD Logroñés | (Spain) Raúl Llona | (Spain) Miguel Ledo | Logroño Deporte | Embalajes Blanco |
| Talavera | (Spain) Manuel Mosquera | (Spain) Juan Góngora | Umbro | Vaquero del Pino |
| Tudelano | (Spain) Carlos Salvachúa | (Argentina) Lucas Aveldaño | Joma | Aceites Urzante |
| Unionistas | (Spain) Luis Ayllón | (Spain) Carlos de la Nava | Erreà | Grupo Ecotisa |
| UD Logroñés | (Spain) Albert Aguilà | (Spain) Iñaki Sáenz | Umbro | Natur House |
| Valladolid Promesas | (Brazil) Júlio Baptista | (Spain) Sergio Nieto | Adidas | Estrella Galicia |
| Zamora | (Spain) Yago Iglesias | (Spain) Dani Hernández | Uhlsport | Caja Rural |

==== Standings ====
| Pos | Team | Pld | W | D | L | GF | GA | GD | Pts | Qualification |
|---|---|---|---|---|---|---|---|---|---|---|
| 1 | Racing Santander (C, P) | 38 | 25 | 7 | 6 | 61 | 31 | +30 | 82 | Promotion to Segunda División and qualification for Copa del Rey |
| 2 | Deportivo La Coruña (Note: Deportivo La Coruña awarded a 3–0 win over Extremadura after the latter refused to take the pitch in their Round 12 match. Extremadura was subsequently deducted 3 points.) | 38 | 22 | 8 | 8 | 59 | 29 | +30 | 74 | Qualification for the promotion play–offs and Copa del Rey |
| 3 | Racing Ferrol (Note: Racing Ferrol awarded a 3–0 win over Extremadura after failing show up in Round 25 match.) | 38 | 21 | 9 | 8 | 50 | 26 | +24 | 72 | Qualification for the promotion play–offs and Copa del Rey |
| 4 | Rayo Majadahonda | 38 | 19 | 5 | 14 | 50 | 47 | +3 | 62 (Note: Rayo Majadahonda is ahead of UD Logroñés on head-to-head points: Rayo Majadahonda–UD Logroñés 1–0, UD Logroñés–Rayo Majadahonda 0–1) | Qualification for the promotion play–offs and Copa del Rey |
| 5 | UD Logroñés | 38 | 18 | 8 | 12 | 41 | 37 | +4 | 62 | Qualification for the promotion play–offs and Copa del Rey |
| 6 | Celta Vigo B | 38 | 17 | 10 | 11 | 60 | 46 | +14 | 61 (Note: Celta Vigo B is ahead of Unionistas on head-to-head points: Celta Vigo B 4, Unionistas 1) | |
| 7 | Unionistas (Note: Internacional awarded a 3–0 win over Unionistas due to illegal alignment in their Round 10 match. Match originally ended 0–0.) | 38 | 16 | 13 | 9 | 55 | 37 | +18 | 61 | |
| 8 | Real Unión | 38 | 18 | 6 | 14 | 51 | 45 | +6 | 60 | |
| 9 | Badajoz | 38 | 14 | 14 | 10 | 40 | 30 | +10 | 56 | |
| 10 | San Sebastián de los Reyes | 38 | 15 | 8 | 15 | 40 | 41 | −1 | 53 | |
| 11 | Calahorra | 38 | 14 | 10 | 14 | 48 | 43 | +5 | 52 | |
| 12 | Cultural Leonesa | 38 | 12 | 13 | 13 | 61 | 55 | +6 | 49 | |
| 13 | SD Logroñés | 38 | 12 | 12 | 14 | 43 | 43 | 0 | 48 | |
| 14 | Internacional | 38 | 11 | 13 | 14 | 46 | 51 | −5 | 46 | Disqualified by Federation |
| 15 | Athletic Bilbao B | 38 | 11 | 12 | 15 | 36 | 46 | −10 | 45 | |
| 16 | Talavera de la Reina (Note: Talavera de la Reina readmitted into the 2022–23 Primera Federación after the RFEF excluded Internacional from the competition.) | 38 | 11 | 9 | 18 | 39 | 54 | −15 | 42 | |
| 17 | Zamora (R) | 38 | 9 | 10 | 19 | 30 | 48 | −18 | 37 | Relegation to Segunda División RFEF |
| 18 | Valladolid Promesas (R) | 38 | 9 | 9 | 20 | 42 | 64 | −22 | 36 | Relegation to Segunda División RFEF |
| 19 | Tudelano (R) | 38 | 7 | 7 | 24 | 33 | 54 | −21 | 28 | Relegation to Segunda División RFEF |
| 20 | Extremadura (Note: Extremadura was expelled from the competition after two no-shows in the competition. All subsequent matches will be awarded 0–2 for their rivals.) (D) | 38 | 5 | 5 | 28 | 22 | 80 | −58 | 0 | Disqualified by Federation |

Source: SoccerWay
Rules for classification: 1) points; 2) head-to-head points; 3) head-to-head goal difference; 4) goal difference; 5) number of goals scored
(C) Champions; (D) Disqualified; (P) Promoted; (R) Relegated

==== Results ====
Home team score is given first.

| Home \ Away | ATH | BAD | CAL | CEL | CUL | DEP | EXT | INT | RFE | RAC | RMJ | RUN | SSR | SDL | TAL | TUD | UNI | UDL | VLD | ZAM |
|---|---|---|---|---|---|---|---|---|---|---|---|---|---|---|---|---|---|---|---|---|
| Athletic Bilbao B | — | 0–0 | 1–3 | 0–1 | 1–2 | 1–1 | 3–0 | 1–0 | 2–2 | 2–1 | 1–1 | 0–0 | 0–2 | 1–0 | 0–1 | 1–0 | 0–1 | 3–1 | 3–0 | 1–0 |
| Badajoz | 1–0 | — | 0–0 | 1–1 | 3–3 | 3–0 | 2–0 | 1–0 | 1–1 | 0–1 | 1–2 | 2–1 | 2–1 | 2–2 | 2–0 | 2–1 | 1–0 | 1–2 | 1–2 | 0–0 |
| Calahorra | 1–1 | 1–0 | — | 1–0 | 2–0 | 0–3 | 6–1 | 1–2 | 1–1 | 1–2 | 0–1 | 2–4 | 3–2 | 2–1 | 1–2 | 3–0 | 1–1 | 0–0 | 2–1 | 0–0 |
| Celta Vigo B | 4–1 | 0–0 | 2–2 | — | 5–3 | 2–1 | 1–1 | 1–2 | 0–1 | 2–1 | 3–1 | 1–2 | 1–2 | 3–2 | 2–0 | 0–2 | 3–1 | 0–1 | 3–0 | 1–0 |
| Cultural Leonesa | 2–1 | 1–0 | 3–0 | 0–1 | — | 2–3 | 2–1 | 1–1 | 0–2 | 3–0 | 0–2 | 1–1 | 2–0 | 2–2 | 1–2 | 3–1 | 0–1 | 1–2 | 4–2 | 0–0 |
| Deportivo La Coruña | 1–1 | 1–0 | 2–1 | 5–0 | 2–1 | — | 3–0 (Note: Deportivo La Coruña awarded a 3–0 win after Extremadura refused to take the pitch in their Round 12 match.) | 3–0 | 0–0 | 0–1 | 2–1 | 1–2 | 1–0 | 1–1 | 1–0 | 4–3 | 0–1 | 3–0 | 3–0 | 1–0 |
| Extremadura | 0–2^{1} | 0–2^{1} | 0–2 | 0–2^{1} | 1–3 | 0–2^{1} | — | 1–2 | 1–0 | 2–4 | 3–2 | 0–2^{1} | 0–6 | 0–0 | 0–2 | 1–1 | 0–2^{1} | 0–2^{1} | 1–0 | 2–2 |
| Internacional | 3–0 | 1–0 | 2–3 | 1–1 | 3–2 | 2–3 | 4–2 | — | 0–0 | 0–3 | 2–4 | 2–0 | 0–0 | 3–1 | 1–1 | 1–1 | 3–0 (Note: Internacional awarded a 3–0 win over Unionistas due to illegal alignment. Match originally ended 0–0.) | 2–2 | 2–2 | 1–1 |
| Racing Ferrol | 1–1 | 0–1 | 2–1 | 5–0 | 1–1 | 0–0 | 3–0 (Note: Racing Ferrol awarded a 3–0 win over Extremadura after failing show up in Round 25 match.: ^{1} The opponents of Extremadura since the round 25 awarded a 2–0 w/o win each.) | 2–0 | — | 1–1 | 2–1 | 2–1 | 1–0 | 0–2 | 1–0 | 3–1 | 0–1 | 0–1 | 2–1 | 1–3 |
| Racing Santander | 2–0 | 0–0 | 1–0 | 2–2 | 4–0 | 0–0 | 2–0^{1} | 2–0 | 1–0 | — | 3–2 | 4–1 | 0–0 | 1–0 | 5–1 | 1–0 | 1–1 | 1–0 | 1–0 | 2–1 |
| Rayo Majadahonda | 1–1 | 0–0 | 2–1 | 0–0 | 1–0 | 1–2 | 2–0^{1} | 2–1 | 0–2 | 2–4 | — | 1–0 | 1–0 | 1–0 | 1–2 | 1–0 | 4–3 | 1–0 | 3–1 | 3–2 |
| Real Unión | 1–1 | 1–2 | 0–2 | 1–4 | 1–1 | 2–1 | 0–1 | 2–1 | 0–3 | 1–2 | 1–0 | — | 0–1 | 2–1 | 3–1 | 3–1 | 1–1 | 1–1 | 2–1 | 2–0 |
| San Sebast. Reyes | 2–0 | 0–0 | 0–3 | 0–7 | 0–3 | 0–0 | 1–0 | 1–0 | 1–0 | 0–1 | 2–1 | 0–2 | — | 3–1 | 1–0 | 2–1 | 1–2 | 1–1 | 1–1 | 3–1 |
| SD Logroñés | 1–1 | 1–1 | 0–0 | 1–1 | 1–1 | 1–0 | 2–0^{1} | 0–1 | 0–2 | 0–1 | 3–1 | 0–2 | 1–0 | — | 3–2 | 3–0 | 1–0 | 3–2 | 1–1 | 2–0 |
| Talavera de la Reina | 4–0 | 1–3 | 0–0 | 1–2 | 0–5 | 1–1 | 1–1 | 1–1 | 1–2 | 1–1 | 0–0 | 1–3 | 2–0 | 1–0 | — | 2–1 | 1–1 | 2–0 | 0–2 | 0–1 |
| Tudelano | 2–2 | 1–2 | 0–1 | 2–0 | 1–1 | 0–1 | 2–0^{1} | 1–0 | 0–1 | 3–0 | 3–0 | 0–2 | 0–2 | 0–2 | 0–2 | — | 1–1 | 0–0 | 1–2 | 0–1 |
| Unionistas | 0–1 | 2–2 | 3–0 | 1–1 | 2–2 | 2–1 | 3–0 | 2–0 | 0–1 | 1–2 | 2–1 | 2–1 | 0–0 | 3–3 | 4–1 | 3–1 | — | 4–0 | 0–0 | 2–1 |
| UD Logroñés | 1–0 | 1–0 | 1–0 | 0–0 | 0–0 | 0–1 | 1–3 | 1–1 | 1–2 | 1–0 | 0–1 | 1–0 | 1–0 | 0–1 | 1–0 | 1–0 | 2–1 | — | 3–2 | 4–1 |
| Valladolid Promesas | 3–1 | 1–0 | 1–1 | 1–3 | 3–3 | 0–4 | 2–0^{1} | 2–2 | 1–2 | 3–0 | 0–1 | 0–2 | 2–2 | 2–0 | 2–1 | 0–2 | 0–0 | 0–2 | — | 1–3 |
| Zamora | 0–1 | 1–1 | 1–0 | 1–0 | 2–2 | 0–1 | 2–0^{1} | 0–2 | 0–1 | 0–3 | 0–1 | 0–1 | 0–3 | 0–0 | 1–1 | 0–0 | 2–1 | 1–4 | 2–0 | — |

Source: SoccerWay
Legend: Blue = home team win; Yellow = draw; Red = away team win.

=== Group 2 (South East) ===
Location of teams in 2021–22 Primera División RFEF – Group 2

==== Teams and locations ====
| Team | Home city | Stadium | Capacity |
|---|---|---|---|
| Albacete | Albacete | Carlos Belmonte | 17,524 |
| Alcoyano | Alcoy | El Collao | 4,850 |
| Algeciras | Algeciras | Nuevo Mirador | 7,200 |
| Andorra | Andorra la Vella, Andorra | Estadi Nacional | 3,306 |
| Atlético Baleares | Palma | Estadi Balear | 6,000 |
| Atlético Sanluqueño | Sanlúcar de Barrameda | El Palmar | 5,000 |
| Barcelona B | Barcelona | Johan Cruyff | 6,000 |
| Betis Deportivo | Seville | Luis del Sol | 1,300 |
| Castellón | Castellón | Castalia | 15,500 |
| Cornellà | Cornellà de Llobregat | Nou Municipal de Cornellà | 1,500 |
| Costa Brava | Palamós | Palamós Costa Brava | 3,724 |
| Gimnàstic | Tarragona | Nou Estadi | 14,591 |
| Linares | Linares | Linarejos | 10,000 |
| Linense | La Línea de la Concepción | Municipal de La Línea | 12,000 |
| Real Madrid Castilla | Madrid | Alfredo di Stéfano | 6,000 |
| Sabadell | Sabadell | Nova Creu Alta | 11,908 |
| San Fernando | San Fernando | Iberoamericano | 12,000 |
| Sevilla Atlético | Seville | Jesús Navas | 8,000 |
| UCAM Murcia | Murcia | La Condomina | 6,000 |
| Villarreal B | Villarreal | Mini Estadi | 5,000 |

==== Personnel and sponsorship ====
| Team | Manager | Captain | Kit manufacturer | Shirt main sponsor |
|---|---|---|---|---|
| Albacete | (Spain) Rubén de la Barrera | (Spain) Rafa Gálvez | Adidas | Extrual |
| Alcoyano | (Spain) Vicente Parras | (Spain) Juli | Kappa | Unión Alcoyana Seguros |
| Algeciras | (Spain) Iván Ania | (Spain) Iván Turrillo | Uhlsport | Inmobiliaria Master House |
| Andorra | (Spain) Eder Sarabia | (Spain) Rubén Bover | Nike | Mora Banc Grup |
| Atlético Baleares | (Spain) Eloy Jiménez | (Spain) Pedro Orfila | Joma | Hyundai |
| Atlético Sanluqueño | (Spain) Antonio Iriondo | (Spain) Edu Oriol | Umbro | Barbadillo |
| Barcelona B | (Spain) Sergi Barjuán | (Spain) Arnau Comas | Nike | |
| Betis Deportivo | (Spain) Pablo del Pino | (Spain) Luis Martínez | Kappa | |
| Castellón | (Spain) Sergi Escobar | (Spain) David Cubillas | Macron | Digi Communications |
| Cornellà | (Spain) Gonzalo Riutort | (Spain) Eloy Gila | Patrick | |
| Costa Brava | (Spain) Oriol Alsina | (Spain) Marcos Pérez | Hummel | Pensador de Apuestas |
| Gimnàstic | (Spain) Raül Agné | (Spain) Joan Oriol | Umbro | Sorigué |
| Linares | (Spain) Alberto González | (Spain) Rodri | Nike | Martín López Carburantes |
| Linense | (Spain) Alberto Monteagudo | (Spain) Ñito González | Legea | Lotus Watches |
| Real Madrid Castilla | (Spain) Raúl | (Spain) Antonio Blanco | Adidas | Emirates |
| Sabadell | (Spain) Pedro Munitis | (Spain) Aleix Coch | Hummel | |
| San Fernando | (Spain) Nacho Castro | (Spain) Francis Ferrón | Kappa | Afa Vitae |
| Sevilla Atlético | (Spain) Alejandro Acejo | (Spain) Pedro Ortiz | Nike | Marathonbet |
| UCAM Murcia | (Spain) José Manuel Aira | (Spain) Biel Ribas | Hummel | UCAM |
| Villarreal B | (Spain) Miguel Álvarez | (Spain) Ramón Bueno | Joma | |

==== Standings ====
| Pos | Team | Pld | W | D | L | GF | GA | GD | Pts | Qualification |
|---|---|---|---|---|---|---|---|---|---|---|
| 1 | Andorra (C, P) | 38 | 21 | 8 | 9 | 61 | 38 | +23 | 71 | Promotion to Segunda División and qualification for Copa del Rey |
| 2 | Villarreal B (O, P) | 38 | 20 | 7 | 11 | 65 | 36 | +29 | 67 (Note: Villarreal B is ahead of Albacete on head-to-head goal difference: Villarreal B–Albacete 3–0, Albacete–Villarreal B 1–0) | Qualification for the promotion play-offs |
| 3 | Albacete (O, P) | 38 | 19 | 10 | 9 | 52 | 34 | +18 | 67 | Qualification for the promotion play-offs and Copa del Rey |
| 4 | Gimnàstic | 38 | 16 | 13 | 9 | 41 | 30 | +11 | 61 | Qualification for the promotion play-offs and Copa del Rey |
| 5 | Linares | 38 | 17 | 9 | 12 | 59 | 47 | +12 | 60 | Qualification for the promotion play-offs and Copa del Rey |
| 6 | Atlético Baleares | 38 | 15 | 14 | 9 | 52 | 35 | +17 | 59 (Note: Atlético Baleares is ahead of Algeciras on head-to-head points: Atlético Baleares 4, Algeciras 1) | Qualification for the Copa del Rey |
| 7 | Algeciras | 38 | 16 | 11 | 11 | 50 | 39 | +11 | 59 | |
| 8 | Sabadell | 38 | 16 | 10 | 12 | 44 | 33 | +11 | 58 | |
| 9 | Barcelona B | 38 | 16 | 9 | 13 | 59 | 51 | +8 | 57 | |
| 10 | Real Madrid Castilla | 38 | 16 | 8 | 14 | 66 | 47 | +19 | 56 | |
| 11 | Alcoyano | 38 | 13 | 13 | 12 | 41 | 40 | +1 | 52 | |
| 12 | Linense | 38 | 13 | 11 | 14 | 35 | 44 | −9 | 50 (Note: Linense is ahead of Castellón on head-to-head points: Linense 6, Castellón 0) | |
| 13 | Castellón | 38 | 14 | 8 | 16 | 37 | 50 | −13 | 50 | |
| 14 | Cornellà | 38 | 14 | 6 | 18 | 39 | 48 | −9 | 48 (Note: Cornellà is ahead of San Fernando on head-to-head points: Cornellà 4, San Fernando 1) | |
| 15 | San Fernando | 38 | 13 | 9 | 16 | 49 | 58 | −9 | 48 | |
| 16 | Atlético Sanluqueño (R) | 38 | 12 | 10 | 16 | 39 | 56 | −17 | 46 (Note: Atlético Sanluqueño is ahead of Sevilla Atlético on head-to-head points: Atlético Sanluqueño 6, Sevilla Atlético 0) | Relegation to Segunda División RFEF |
| 17 | Sevilla Atlético (R) | 38 | 13 | 7 | 18 | 36 | 55 | −19 | 46 | Relegation to Segunda División RFEF |
| 18 | UCAM Murcia (R) | 38 | 8 | 11 | 19 | 42 | 56 | −14 | 35 | Relegation to Segunda División RFEF |
| 19 | Costa Brava (R) | 38 | 6 | 15 | 17 | 26 | 51 | −25 | 33 | Relegation to Segunda División RFEF |
| 20 | Betis Deportivo (R) | 38 | 6 | 3 | 29 | 23 | 68 | −45 | 21 | Relegation to Segunda División RFEF |

Source: SoccerWay
Rules for classification: 1) points; 2) head-to-head points; 3) head-to-head goal difference; 4) goal difference; 5) number of goals scored
(C) Champions; (O) Play-off winners; (P) Promoted; (R) Relegated

==== Results ====
Home team score is given first.

| Home \ Away | ALB | ALC | ALG | AND | ATB | ASL | BAR | BET | CAS | COR | CBV | GIM | LNR | LNS | RMC | SAB | SFE | SEV | UCM | VIL |
|---|---|---|---|---|---|---|---|---|---|---|---|---|---|---|---|---|---|---|---|---|
| Albacete | — | 2–0 | 3–1 | 1–0 | 1–0 | 4–0 | 2–0 | 1–1 | 3–1 | 3–0 | 1–3 | 0–1 | 1–0 | 3–0 | 2–0 | 1–1 | 1–0 | 0–1 | 3–1 | 1–0 |
| Alcoyano | 0–0 | — | 0–0 | 2–2 | 0–0 | 3–0 | 2–3 | 1–0 | 1–1 | 2–0 | 0–1 | 0–1 | 0–2 | 1–0 | 1–1 | 1–1 | 0–2 | 2–1 | 3–2 | 0–0 |
| Algeciras | 0–0 | 1–2 | — | 2–2 | 1–1 | 1–3 | 2–1 | 1–1 | 0–0 | 3–2 | 5–1 | 1–0 | 0–0 | 1–0 | 1–1 | 0–0 | 3–0 | 3–0 | 1–1 | 2–1 |
| Andorra | 3–1 | 1–2 | 1–0 | — | 2–2 | 2–0 | 2–1 | 2–0 | 1–0 | 2–1 | 0–0 | 2–0 | 1–0 | 7–1 | 2–1 | 2–1 | 1–0 | 2–0 | 1–0 | 0–1 |
| Atlético Baleares | 4–1 | 2–1 | 2–1 | 1–1 | — | 0–0 | 6–2 | 1–0 | 2–0 | 0–0 | 1–0 | 1–1 | 1–1 | 1–0 | 1–1 | 3–1 | 1–1 | 0–2 | 3–0 | 0–0 |
| Atlético Sanluqueño | 2–2 | 2–2 | 0–2 | 1–2 | 1–0 | — | 0–2 | 1–0 | 0–1 | 4–0 | 1–1 | 0–0 | 0–2 | 0–0 | 3–1 | 0–3 | 1–0 | 1–0 | 1–1 | 2–1 |
| Barcelona B | 2–2 | 0–0 | 1–1 | 2–1 | 3–1 | 5–0 | — | 1–2 | 5–0 | 2–1 | 0–0 | 0–2 | 1–1 | 2–1 | 2–2 | 0–2 | 0–2 | 4–0 | 2–2 | 2–1 |
| Betis Deportivo | 0–2 | 3–2 | 2–3 | 3–2 | 0–2 | 0–3 | 1–2 | — | 0–1 | 1–3 | 2–1 | 0–3 | 1–3 | 1–2 | 0–3 | 0–4 | 0–1 | 0–1 | 1–0 | 1–2 |
| Castellón | 0–0 | 0–0 | 1–0 | 1–3 | 2–1 | 0–1 | 2–0 | 2–1 | — | 1–3 | 1–0 | 1–1 | 1–1 | 0–2 | 3–0 | 0–1 | 1–3 | 2–0 | 1–0 | 3–3 |
| Cornellà | 1–0 | 2–0 | 4–0 | 0–3 | 0–2 | 1–0 | 1–0 | 2–0 | 1–1 | — | 2–0 | 0–0 | 2–1 | 1–0 | 1–0 | 0–1 | 2–0 | 1–2 | 1–1 | 0–0 |
| Costa Brava | 0–3 | 0–3 | 0–1 | 1–1 | 1–2 | 0–0 | 2–2 | 1–2 | 2–0 | 1–0 | — | 1–0 | 1–4 | 0–0 | 0–1 | 1–1 | 1–1 | 0–0 | 3–0 | 0–0 |
| Gimnàstic | 0–0 | 2–1 | 1–0 | 0–3 | 1–2 | 3–3 | 1–0 | 2–0 | 3–0 | 1–0 | 1–1 | — | 3–1 | 5–1 | 1–0 | 1–0 | 1–1 | 1–0 | 2–2 | 1–0 |
| Linares | 0–0 | 1–1 | 0–3 | 3–1 | 2–0 | 1–1 | 1–2 | 1–0 | 3–0 | 0–3 | 2–0 | 2–0 | — | 0–0 | 1–0 | 2–0 | 3–0 | 4–0 | 1–2 | 2–1 |
| Linense | 4–1 | 1–0 | 0–4 | 3–1 | 1–0 | 1–0 | 1–2 | 3–0 | 1–0 | 1–0 | 0–0 | 0–0 | 5–2 | — | 2–1 | 1–1 | 0–3 | 1–1 | 2–0 | 1–2 |
| Real Madrid Castilla | 0–1 | 1–2 | 2–0 | 3–1 | 2–2 | 5–2 | 0–0 | 4–0 | 1–2 | 5–0 | 5–1 | 2–1 | 4–1 | 1–1 | — | 3–0 | 4–0 | 2–1 | 3–0 | 2–1 |
| Sabadell | 1–0 | 3–0 | 0–1 | 0–1 | 1–0 | 1–0 | 1–3 | 0–0 | 1–3 | 2–1 | 3–0 | 2–0 | 3–1 | 0–0 | 0–2 | — | 2–3 | 1–0 | 1–1 | 0–1 |
| San Fernando | 3–3 | 0–0 | 0–2 | 0–1 | 0–4 | 3–1 | 0–2 | 1–0 | 1–2 | 3–3 | 1–1 | 2–0 | 2–2 | 1–1 | 3–1 | 0–1 | — | 2–3 | 2–1 | 1–3 |
| Sevilla Atlético | 0–1 | 1–3 | 1–3 | 1–1 | 1–1 | 1–2 | 2–1 | 1–0 | 2–0 | 1–0 | 2–1 | 0–0 | 1–4 | 1–0 | 1–1 | 0–0 | 4–1 | — | 0–2 | 2–1 |
| UCAM Murcia | 1–2 | 1–2 | 2–0 | 1–1 | 1–1 | 1–2 | 1–2 | 1–0 | 0–1 | 2–0 | 1–1 | 1–1 | 1–2 | 1–0 | 3–0 | 1–1 | 2–3 | 2–1 | — | 2–3 |
| Villarreal B | 3–0 | 0–1 | 3–0 | 2–0 | 2–1 | 4–1 | 3–0 | 3–0 | 3–2 | 3–0 | 2–0 | 0–0 | 5–0 | 0–0 | 4–1 | 0–3 | 0–3 | 5–1 | 2–1 | — |

Source: SoccerWay
Legend: Blue = home team win; Yellow = draw; Red = away team win.

== Final ==
The winners of the two regular season groups will faced off in a single-match neutral site final to determine the champion of the 2021–22 Primera División RFEF season. The match took place at one of the stadiums designated to host the promotion play-off.

3 June 2022
21:00 UTC+2

| Racing Santander | 3–0 | Andorra |
|---|---|---|
| Cedric 23', 62'; Soko 86' | Report |

Estadio da Malata, Ferrol
Attendance: 350
Referee: Pedro Eugenio Muñoz Piedra

| Racing | Andorra |

| 13 | GK | (Spain) Miquel Parera |
| 4 | DF | (Spain) Pol Moreno |
| 5 | DF | (Spain) Pablo Bobadilla |
| 16 | DF | (Spain) Javi Vázquez |
| 17 | DF | (Spain) Unai Medina |
| 8 | MF | (Spain) Fausto Tienza | (yellow card) 35' | (substituted off) 88' |
| 6 | MF | (Spain) Íñigo Sainz-Maza |
| 10 | MF | (Spain) Pablo Torre | (yellow card) 75' | (substituted off) 75' |
| 22 | MF | (Spain) Arturo Molina |
| 12 | MF | (Cameroon) Patrick Soko | (yellow card) 87' |
| 9 | FW | (Nigeria) Cedric Omoigui | | (substituted off) 82' |
Substitutions:
| 1 | GK | (Spain) Lucas Díaz |
| 30 | DF | (Spain) Mario Jorrin |
| 7 | MF | (Spain) Álvaro Bustos |
| 11 | MF | (Spain) Marco Camus | | (substituted on) 75' |
| 14 | MF | (Spain) Borja Domínguez | | (substituted on) 88' |
| 20 | MF | (Spain) Sergio Marcos | | (substituted on) 88' |
| 26 | MF | (Spain) Simón Pérez |
| 21 | FW | (Scotland) Jack Harper |
| 23 | FW | (Spain) Manu Justo | | (substituted on) 82' |
Manager:
(Spain) Guillermo Fernández Romo

| 1 | GK | (Argentina) Nico Ratti |
| 18 | DF | (Spain) Diego González | | (substituted off) 80' |
| 26 | DF | (Spain) Álex Pastor | (yellow card) 58' |
| 20 | DF | (Spain) Martí Vilà |
| 15 | DF | (Spain) Dani Morer |
| 2 | DF | (Spain) Adrià Altimira | | (substituted off) 60' |
| 6 | MF | (Spain) Marc Aguado |
| 7 | MF | (Netherlands) Hector Hevel | (yellow card) 22' | (substituted off) 80' |
| 14 | MF | (Spain) Sergio Molina | (yellow card) 45' | (substituted off) 60' |
| 11 | MF | (Spain) Marc Fernández | (yellow card) 42' | (substituted off) 80' |
| 10 | FW | (Spain) Carlos Martínez | (yellow card) 54' |
Substitutions:
| 13 | GK | (Spain) Josele Martínez |
| 3 | DF | (Spain) Roger Riera |
| 23 | DF | (Spain) Eudald Vergés | | (substituted on) 80' |
| 27 | DF | (Spain) Pau Casadesús |
| 4 | MF | (Spain) Marc Pedraza |
| 8 | MF | (Spain) Martí Riverola |
| 16 | MF | (Senegal) Zourdine Thior |
| 17 | MF | (Spain) David Martín | | (substituted on) 80' |
| 21 | MF | (Spain) Rubén Bover | | (substituted on) 60' |
| 22 | MF | (Spain) Iván Gil | | (substituted on) 60' |
| 9 | FW | (Spain) Rubén Enri | | (substituted on) 80' |
| 19 | FW | (Spain) Manuel Nieto |
Manager:
(Spain) Eder Sarabia

== Copa del Rey qualifiers ==
The following clubs qualified for the 2022–23 Copa del Rey by virtue of their league finish:

Group 1
| Position | Team |
|---|---|
| 1st | Racing Santander |
| 2nd | Deportivo La Coruña |
| 3rd | Racing Ferrol |
| 4th | Rayo Majadahonda |
| 5th | UD Logroñés |

Group 2
| Position | Team |
|---|---|
| 1st | Andorra |
| 3rd | Albacete |
| 4th | Gimnàstic |
| 5th | Linares |
| 6th | Atlético Baleares |

== Top goalscorers ==
| Rank | Player | Team | Goals |
|---|---|---|---|
| 1 | (Spain) Ferran Jutglà | Barcelona B | 19 |
| 1 | (Spain) Alberto Quiles | Deportivo La Coruña | 18 |
| 2 | (Spain) Dioni | Atlético Baleares | 17 |
| 3 | (Nigeria) Cedric Omoigui | Racing Santander | 16 |
| 3 | (Spain) Juan Carlos Arana | Villarreal B | 16 |

== See also ==
- 2021–22 La Liga
- 2021–22 Segunda División
- 2021–22 Segunda División RFEF
- 2021–22 Tercera División RFEF
