= Basque Football Federation =

Governing body of association football in the Basque Country

Basque Football Federation Federación Vasca de Fútbol-Euskadiko futbol Federakundea
Flag of the Basque Country
- Short name: EFF-FVF
- Founded: 1988
- Headquarters: Bilbao, Spain
- Membership: Royal Spanish Football Federation (RFEF)
- FIFA affiliation: Union of Basque Sports Federations
- President: Iker Goñi
- General Secretary: Kepa Allica
- Website: euskadifutbol.eus

The Basque Football Federation (Basque: Euskadiko Futbol Federakundea, EFF; Spanish: Federación Vasca de Fútbol, FVF) is the body responsible for managing association football in the Basque Country autonomous region. Its offices are in Bilbao (in the Otxarkoaga-Txurdinaga district).

The federation manages several leagues such as the Basque Youth League and the Basque Women's Football League, as well as the Basque regional stage of the Federation Cup. It also organises Group 4 of the regionalised Tercera Federación (the fifth tier of the men's Spanish football league system), although unlike most parts of the country, the leagues at the sixth level and below are administered separately by provincial federations for Álava, Biscay and Gipuzkoa.

The federation organises and selects the Basque Country national football team which draws its players not only from the Basque Country autonomous region, but also the neighbouring Basque regions of Navarre and the French Basque Country. The women's senior national team also follows this model, but the various youth representative squads contesting nationwide competitions, and the Basque amateur-level selection playing in the Spanish stage of the UEFA Regions' Cup, are composed of players only from the Basque Country autonomous region.

The Basque Football Federation is part of the Royal Spanish Football Federation (RFEF).

== History ==
In the early 20th century, football federations were formed for each of the Basque regions of Biscay (1913, as the 'North Federation' with Cantabria) and Gipuzkoa (a 1918 offshoot), with each holding their own tournaments (the Biscay Championship and Gipuzkoa Championship respectively). As long ago as 1931 the idea of creating a single federation for the whole Basque Country was considered, but for various reasons this was not done at that time. In 1988 the Basque Football Federacion was finally created, encompassing the original provincial federations as well as a new one for Álava (split off from Gipuzkoa the previous year), each of which continues to organise football competitions within their area.

== Purpose ==
The Basque Football Federation's purpose is to promote, organise and authorise association football competition across the Basque Country autonomous region.

In addition to this, it selects and arranges fixtures for the Basque Country national football team l, for which it aims to gain UEFA and FIFA affiliation so that it can participate in regular international competitions.

== FIFA affiliation ==
The Basque Football Federation has as one of its aims the official participation of the Basque Country national team in international competitions.

In 1979, Pablo Porta, president of the Spanish Football Federation, stated that the Basque Country might participate in the next World Cup; he explained that in the same way that Welsh clubs participate in the English league but are also represented by the Wales national team, so the same model could be used in Spain. However this idea has not been implemented.

In 2010, the Basque Football Federation changed its statutes to claim responsibility for international competitions in the greater Basque Country, but the Supreme Court of Spain suspended these new statutes.

In 2012, it was decided by the Constitutional Court of Spain that the Basque Country could compete in international competitions so long as it did not compete against Spain.

In early 2019, the Federation voted in favour of applying to FIFA and UEFA for official recognition for the team.

In December 2020, Basque federation applied for UEFA and FIFA recognition.

== Competitions ==
The Basque Football Federation organises the following competitions:

- Tercera Federación (Group 4)
- RFEF Basque tournament (Regional phase of the Federation Cup)
- Copa Vasca Juvenil (Basque Youth Cup)
- Liga Vasca Juvenil (Basque Youth League)
- Liga Vasca Cadete
- Copa Vasca Cadete
- Liga Vasca Femenina (Basque Women's Football League)
- Copa Vasca Femenina (Basque Women's Cup)
- Liga Vasca de Fútbol Sala (Basque Futsal league)

== Champions ==
These tables provide the winners of the competitions administered by the Basque Football Federation each season.

=== Tercera División ===
Winners of the Basque Country fourth tier group, with possible promotion to the level above and an entry to the following season's Copa del Rey.

Season	Winning Club	Province	Points	Promoted	Segunda B	Copa del Rey
1980–81	SD Erandio Club	Biscay	55	Yes	7th	1st round
1981–82	SD Eibar	Gipuzkoa	51	No	N/A	3rd round
1982–83	SCD Durango	Biscay	55	No	N/A	1st round
1983–84	CD Santurtzi	Biscay	59	No	N/A	2nd round
1984–85	CD Basconia	Biscay	56	No	N/A	2nd round
1985–86	SD Eibar (2)	Gipuzkoa	58	Yes	7th	Round of 16
1986–87	SCD Durango (2)	Biscay	51	Yes	8th	1st round
1987–88	Barakaldo CF	Biscay	53	Yes	2nd	Did not enter
1988–89	CD Santurtzi (2)	Biscay	55	Yes	12th	Did not enter
1989–90	Deportivo Alavés	Álava	60	Yes	2nd	2nd round
1990–91	CD Hernani	Gipuzkoa	50	Yes	14th	2nd round
1991–92	Real Unión	Gipuzkoa	53	No	N/A	2nd round
1992–93	Real Unión (2)	Gipuzkoa	54	Yes	14th	2nd round
1993–94	Amurrio Club	Álava	53	Yes	11th	Did not enter
1994–95	CD Aurrerá de Vitoria	Álava	55	Yes	9th	1st round
1995–96	Zalla UC	Biscay	78	Yes	19th (R)	2nd round
1996–97	CD Touring	Gipuzkoa	72	No	N/A	Did not enter
1997–98	CD Basconia (2)	Biscay	71	No (Note: Ineligible for promotion due to the presence of another team in the same club structure in the level above.)	N/A	N/A (Note: Ineligible for the Copa del Rey due to being a subsidiary of another club.)
1998–99	Real Sociedad B	Gipuzkoa	89	No	N/A	N/A
1999–2000	Real Sociedad B (2)	Gipuzkoa	82	No	N/A	N/A
2000–01	SD Lemona	Biscay	92	No	N/A	Round of 64
2001–02	SD Lemona (2)	Biscay	78	No	N/A	Round of 64
2002–03	CD Basconia (3)	Biscay	71	No	N/A	N/A
2003–04	Sestao River Club	Biscay	78	Yes	19th (R)	First round
2004–05	Club Portugalete	Biscay	83	Yes	19th (R)	Second round
2005–06	Sestao River Club (2)	Biscay	90	Yes	5th	First round
2006–07	Zalla UC	Biscay	76	No	N/A	First round
2007–08	Club Portugalete (2)	Biscay	69	No	N/A	Round of 32
2008–09	CD Lagun Onak	Gipuzkoa	73	No	N/A	Third round
2009–10	Real Sociedad B (3)	Gipuzkoa	75	Yes	11th	N/A
2010–11	SD Amorebieta	Biscay	81	Yes	4th	First round
2011–12	CD Laudio	Álava	77	No	N/A	First round
2012–13	CD Laudio	Álava	81	Yes	17th (R)	Third round
2013–14	SD Leioa	Biscay	81	Yes	15th	Third round
2014–15	Club Portugalete (3)	Biscay	75	Yes	19th (R)	First round
2015–16	Zamudio SD	Biscay	74	Yes	20th (R)	First round
2016–17	Deportivo Alavés B	Álava	74	No	N/A	N/A
2017–18	SCD Durango (3)	Biscay	77	Yes	TBU	First round

=== Women ===
==== Liga Vasca Femenina ====
The Liga Vasca (Basque League) was introduced (along with other regional sections) in the 2012–13 season as a stage between the provincial leagues and the Segunda División, which is also divided into geographical groups. The table also shows the winner of the promotion playoff between the Álava, Gipuzkoa and Biscay leagues in the seasons prior to the introduction of the all-Basque league.

Season	Winning Club	Province	Points	Progress
2007–08	CD Aurrerá de Vitoria	Álava	N/A	4th
2008–09	Abanto Club	Biscay	N/A	7th
2009–10	CF Berrio-Otxoa	Biscay	N/A	10th
2010–11	Pauldarrak FKT	Biscay	N/A	8th
2011–12	Zarautz KE	Gipuzkoa	N/A	14th (R)
2012–13	Barakaldo CF	Biscay	69 (Note: 14 teams in group.)	12th (R)
2013–14	CD Mariño KK	Gipuzkoa	62	8th
2014–15	SD Eibar	Gipuzkoa	62	4th
2015–16	CD Gasteizko Neskak	Álava	79 (Note: 16 teams in group.)	8th
2016–17	Zarautz KE	Gipuzkoa	71	13th (R)
2017–18	Bizkerre FT	Biscay	81	7th
2018–19	Tolosa CF	Gipuzkoa	71	12th
2019–20 (Note: Became a 4th-level league rather than 3rd-level after the introduction of the Segunda División Pro in 2019.)	Real Sociedad B	Gipuzkoa	64 (Note: League curtailed due to the COVID-19 pandemic in Spain.)	3rd
2020–21	Athletic Club C	Biscay	59 (Note: seventeen teams in two winter subgroups followed by two spring subgroups.)	.

==== Copa Vasca Femenina ====
The Copa Vasca (Basque Cup) has been held since the 1980s. In its current incarnation, it is usually disputed between clubs from the region who are not in the Primera División; the senior team of Athletic Bilbao have never taken part since their formation in 2002, although their B-team has featured in several finals.

From 2020, the Copa Vasca was incorporated as 'Group B' of the Copa Euskal Herria (Basque Country Cup), which does include top division clubs – all of the finals of that competition have featured Athletic Club or Real Sociedad (usually both).

Season	Province	Winners	Score	Runners-up
1995–96 (I)	Gipuzkoa	Eibartarrak FT	–	CD Sondika
1996–97 (II)			–	
1997–98 (III)			–	
1998–99 (IV)	Biscay	CD Sondika	–	
1999–2000 (V)	Gipuzkoa	Oiartzun KE	–	Eibartarrak FT
2000–01 (VI)			–	
2001–02 (VII)	Gipuzkoa	Eibartarrak FT	–	Añorga KKE
2002–03 (VIII)			–	
2003–04 (IX)	Biscay	Athletic Club B	0–0 (Note: Athletic B won on penalties)	CD Mariño KK
2004–05 (X)	Biscay	Athletic Club B	2–2	Añorga KKE
2005–06 (XI)	Gipuzkoa	SD Eibar	–	Añorga KKE
2006–07 (XII)	Gipuzkoa	Real Sociedad	–	SD Eibar
2007–08 (XIII)	Biscay	SD San Ignacio	1–1 (Note: San Ignacio won on penalties)	Oiartzun KE
2008–09 (XIV)	Álava	CD Aurrerá de Vitoria	2–1	Athletic Club B
2009–10 (XV)	Álava	CD Aurrerá de Vitoria	3–0	Abanto Club
2010–11 (XVI)	Biscay	Athletic Club B	2–0	SD Eibar
2011–12 (XVII)	Gipuzkoa	Añorga KKE	2–1	Athletic Club B
2012–13 (XVIII)	Gipuzkoa	Oiartzun KE	3–2	Real Sociedad
2013–14 (IXX)	Biscay	Pauldarrak FKT	1–0	Añorga KKE
2014–15 (XX)	Biscay	Athletic Club B	2–0	Añorga KKE
2015–16 (XXI)	Gipuzkoa	Añorga KKE	1–1 (Note: Añorga won on penalties)	SD Eibar
2016–17 (XXII)	Biscay	Pauldarrak FKT	1–0	Athletic Club B
2017–18 (XXIII)	Biscay	Athletic Club B	4–2	Añorga KKE
2018–19 (XXIV)	Biscay	Athletic Club B	3–0	CD Aurrerá de Vitoria
2019–20	Moved from end of season to start of following season			
2020–21 (X) (Note: Editions now numbered alongside Copa Euskal Herria)	Gipuzkoa	Añorga KKE	5–0	CD Aurrerá de Vitoria
2021–22 (XI)	Gipuzkoa	Añorga KKE	1–0	Bizkerre FT
2022–23 (XII)	Biscay	SD San Ignacio	1–1	Bizkerre FT
2023–24 (XIII)	Gipuzkoa	Real Sociedad B	2–0	Athletic Club C

== Notable clubs affiliated to BFF ==
(as of 2021–22 season) La Liga

- Deportivo Alavés
- Athletic Bilbao
- Real Sociedad de Fútbol

Segunda División

- SD Amorebieta
- SD Eibar
- Real Sociedad B

Primera División RFEF

- Athletic Bilbao B
- Real Unión

Segunda División RFEF

- Arenas Club de Getxo
- Gernika Club
- Sestao River Club
- Real Sociedad C

Primera División (women)

- Deportivo Alavés Gloriosas
- Athletic Club (women)
- SD Eibar (women)
- Real Sociedad (women)

Segunda División Pro (women)

- Athletic Club Femenino B

== Presidents ==
- Laurentzi Gana Gorozika (1992–?)
- Iñaki Dobaran Garetxana (2006–2009)
- Santiago Arostegi Oleagordia (2009–2012)
- Luis Maria Elustondo Ciarreta (2012–present)

== General Secretary ==
- Jon Ander Gamboa (1993-2014)
- Kepa Allica (2014–present)

== See also ==
- Basque football derbies
- List of Basque footballers
- List of Spanish regional football federations
- Football in the Basque Country
- Basque Swimming Federation
