= List of UP Langreo seasons =

This is a list of seasons played by UP Langreo in Spanish football, from 1961 to the most recent completed season. It details the club's achievements in major competitions, and the top scorers in league games for each season.

The club played eight seasons in Segunda División, 19 in Segunda División B, 4 in Segunda Federación/Segunda División RFEF and 33 in Tercera División, eight of them as the third tier in Spanish football.

== Key ==
Key to league record:

- Pos = Final position
- Pld = Played
- W = Games won
- D = Games drawn
- L = Games lost
- GF = Goals for
- GA = Goals against
- Pts = Points

Key to playoffs record:

- PP = Promotion playoffs
- RP = Relegation playoffs
- → = Remained in the same category
- ↑ = Promoted
- ↓ = Relegated

Key to rounds:

- W = Winner
- RU = Runner-up
- SF = Semi-finals
- QF = Quarter-finals
- R16 = Round of 16
- R32 = Round of 32
- R64 = Round of 64
- 6R = Sixth round
- 5R = Fifth round
- 4R = Fourth round
- 3R = Third round
- 2R = Second round
- 1R = First round
- GS = Group stage

Champions	Runners-up	Promoted	Relegated

== Seasons ==
Season	League									Cup	Other Competitions		Top scorer	
Season	Div	Pos	Pld	W	D	L	GF	GA	Pts	Cup	Other Competitions		Name(s)	Goal
1961–62	3ª	1st	30	25	1	4	108	28	51					
1961–62	3ª	PP	5	3	0	2	9	5	↑					
1962–63	2ª	13th	30	8	9	13	33	42	25	1R			(Spain) Ángel Herrero (Spain) Victoriano Michelena	7
1962–63	2ª	RP	2	1	1	0	2	0	→	1R			(Spain) Ángel Herrero (Spain) Victoriano Michelena	7
1963–64	2ª	11th	30	10	7	13	33	40	27	R32			(Spain) Tono	11
1964–65	2ª	12th	30	11	5	14	40	51	27	R1			(Spain) José Antonio Calleja	9
1965–66	2ª	13th	30	10	3	17	37	58	23	R32			(Spain) Eduardo del Álamo	12
1965–66	2ª	RP	2	1	0	1	4	2	→	R32			(Spain) Eduardo del Álamo	12
1966–67	2ª	13th	30	9	7	14	32	42	25	1R			(Spain) Julio Santamaría	7
1966–67	2ª	RP	1	1	1	0	7	4	→	1R			(Spain) Julio Santamaría	7
1967–68	2ª	10th	30	12	4	14	32	37	28	R32			(Spain) Julio Santamaría	7
1968–69	3ª	2nd	38	26	5	7	89	33	57					
1969–70	3ª	1st	38	24	11	3	70	21	59	2R				
1969–70	3ª	PP	2	1	1	0	2	1	↑	2R				
1970–71	2ª	17th	38	11	10	17	24	42	32	R32			(Spain) Sánchez Iglesias	7
1970–71	2ª	RP	2	1	1	0	4	2	→	R32			(Spain) Sánchez Iglesias	7
1971–72	2ª	20th	38	11	5	22	38	53	27	4R			(Spain) José Miguel Secades	9
1972–73	3ª	8th	38	13	14	11	40	28	40	3R				
1973–74	3ª	2nd	38	20	11	7	57	30	51	4R				
1973–74	3ª	PP	2	1	0	1	1	5	→	4R				
1974–75	3ª	10th	38	13	12	13	42	30	38	1R			(Spain) Francisco Mendoza	8
1975–76	3ª	11th	38	14	9	15	50	51	37	2R				
1976–77	3ª	7th	38	17	7	14	69	57	41	1R				
1977–78	2ªB	11th	38	14	9	15	50	51	37	2R				
1978–79	2ªB	14th	38	13	10	15	42	46	36	1R				
1979–80	2ªB	5th	38	19	8	11	41	31	46	3R				
1980–81	2ªB	20th	38	6	11	21	41	77	23	2R			(Spain) José Luis	12
1981–82	3ª	1st	38	22	9	7	83	37	53					
1981–82	3ª	PP	2	0	1	1	2	4	→					
1982–83	3ª	2nd	38	21	11	6	81	40	53	2R				
1982–83	3ª	PP	2	1	0	1	4	5	→	2R				
1983–84	3ª	3rd	38	18	12	8	63	35	48	1R				
1984–85	3ª	4th	38	22	7	9	79	42	51	1R	League Cup	1R		
1985–86	3ª	1st	38	25	11	2	95	51	61	2R				
1985–86	3ª	PP	2	1	0	1	2	3	→	2R				
1986–87	3ª	3rd	38	23	7	8	82	36	53	R16				
1987–88	2ªB	13th	38	14	8	16	47	43	36	1R			(Spain) Juan Carlos	16
1988–89	2ªB	11th	38	10	14	14	43	49	34	2R			(Spain) Tino	11
1989–90	2ªB	14th	38	12	10	16	39	52	34				(Spain) Juan Luis	9
1990–91	2ªB	18th	38	9	11	18	38	51	29	1R			(Spain) Juan Carlos	11
1991–92	3ª	3rd	38	19	13	6	58	28	51	3R				
1991–92	3ª	PP	6	1	3	2	6	7	→	3R				
1992–93	3ª	3rd	38	23	9	6	81	32	55	1R				
1992–93	3ª	PP	6	3	2	1	7	5	↑	1R				
1993–94	2ªB	4th	38	16	11	11	60	60	43	3R			(Spain) Juan Luis	15
1993–94	2ªB	PP	6	1	2	3	7	11	→	3R			(Spain) Juan Luis	15
1994–95	2ªB	9th	38	16	8	14	40	43	40	2R			(Spain) Javi Rico	8
1995–96	2ªB	10th	38	13	12	13	38	42	51		Asturian RFEF Cup	QF	(Spain) Diego Martín	11
1996–97	2ªB	14th	38	12	12	14	43	57	48		Asturian RFEF Cup	QF	(Spain) Borja Secades	9
1997–98	2ªB	11th	38	12	14	12	49	49	50		Asturian RFEF Cup	C	(Spain) Diego	8
1997–98	2ªB	11th	38	12	14	12	49	49	50		RFEF Cup	R16	(Spain) Diego	8
1998–99	2ªB	18th	38	11	7	20	34	60	40		Asturian RFEF Cup	SF	(Spain) Rober	7
1999–00	3ª	5th	38	18	12	8	63	35	66		Asturian RFEF Cup	1R	(Spain) Pedro Luis	15
2000–01	3ª	3rd	38	24	4	10	75	33	76		Asturian RFEF Cup	1R	(Spain) Javi Prendes	28
2000–01	3ª	PP	6	2	2	2	5	6	→		Asturian RFEF Cup	1R	(Spain) Javi Prendes	28
2001–02	3ª	1st	38	23	10	5	57	24	79		Asturian RFEF Cup	RU	(Spain) Javi Prendes	19
2001–02	3ª	PP	6	3	2	1	6	5	↑		Asturian RFEF Cup	RU	(Spain) Javi Prendes	19
2002–03	2ªB	16th	38	11	12	15	33	39	45	PR	RFEF Cup	R32	(Spain) Javi Prendes	16
2002–03	2ªB	RP	4	0	2	2	4	8	↓	PR	RFEF Cup	R32	(Spain) Javi Prendes	16
2003–04	3ª	5th	38	18	11	9	57	33	65		Asturian RFEF Cup	SF	(Spain) Luis Peñil	11
2004–05	3ª	4th	38	22	6	10	61	29	72		Asturian RFEF Cup	GS	(Spain) Ángel Lobera	20
2004–05	3ª	PP	2	0	1	1	0	2	→		Asturian RFEF Cup	GS	(Spain) Ángel Lobera	20
2005–06	3ª	2nd	38	23	9	6	54	32	78		Asturian RFEF Cup	GS	(Spain) Miguélez	14
2005–06	3ª	PP	2	0	0	2	1	4	→		Asturian RFEF Cup	GS	(Spain) Miguélez	14
2006–07	3ª	3rd	38	21	11	6	61	30	74		Asturian RFEF Cup	SF	(Spain) Teto	15
2006–07	3ª	PP	2	0	1	1	0	1	→		Asturian RFEF Cup	SF	(Spain) Teto	15
2007–08	3ª	3rd	38	21	7	10	59	37	70		Asturian RFEF Cup	RU	(Spain) Romero	16
2007–08	3ª	PP	2	1	0	1	4	2	→		Asturian RFEF Cup	RU	(Spain) Romero	16
2008–09	3ª	5th	38	17	9	12	63	39	60		Asturian RFEF Cup	C	(Spain) Omar	15
2008–09	3ª	5th	38	17	9	12	63	39	60		RFEF Cup	R16	(Spain) Omar	15
2009–10	3ª	5th	38	18	12	8	60	35	66		Asturian RFEF Cup	GS	(Spain) Omar	15
2010–11	3ª	3rd	38	24	5	9	67	30	77		Asturian RFEF Cup	RU	(Spain) Diego Arias	15
2010–11	3ª	PP	2	0	1	1	0	2	→		Asturian RFEF Cup	RU	(Spain) Diego Arias	15
2011–12	3ª	3rd	38	21	9	8	61	29	72		Asturian RFEF Cup	RU	(Spain) Carly	15
2011–12	3ª	PP	2	0	0	2	1	3	→		Asturian RFEF Cup	RU	(Spain) Carly	15
2012–13	3ª	4th	38	20	11	7	54	22	71		Asturian RFEF Cup	SF	(Spain) Lombán	12
2012–13	3ª	PP	2	0	1	1	1	2	→		Asturian RFEF Cup	SF	(Spain) Lombán	12
2013–14	3ª	2nd	38	23	7	8	62	28	76		Asturian RFEF Cup	SF	(Spain) Chus	25
2013–14	3ª	PP	6	4	1	1	6	1	↑		Asturian RFEF Cup	SF	(Spain) Chus	25
2014–15	2ªB	17th	38	11	10	17	37	49	43		Asturian RFEF Cup	RU	(Spain) Juan Carlos Ortiz	8
2015–16	3ª	2nd	38	28	6	4	96	25	90		Asturian RFEF Cup	GS	(Spain) Claudio	28
2015–16	3ª	PP	4	1	2	1	6	5	→		Asturian RFEF Cup	GS	(Spain) Claudio	28
2016–17	3ª	3rd	38	25	9	4	78	26	84		Asturian RFEF Cup	SF	(Spain) Pablo Acebal	15
2016–17	3ª	PP	2	0	1	1	1	2	→		Asturian RFEF Cup	SF	(Spain) Pablo Acebal	15
2017–18	3ª	2nd	38	22	12	4	89	23	78		Asturian RFEF Cup	C	(Spain) Cris Montes	25
2017–18	3ª	PP	6	3	0	3	13	7	↑		RFEF Cup	R32	(Spain) Cris Montes	25
2018–19	2ªB	9th	38	15	7	16	43	48	52	1R	RFEF Cup	R32	(Spain) Roni	10
2019–20	2ªB	10th	28	10	8	10	28	33	38	1R			(Spain) Davo	13
2020–21	2ªB	10th	24	7	9	8	25	30	30		RFEF Cup	R16	(Cameroon) Kalvin Ketu	7
2021–22	2ªRFEF	11th	34	11	11	12	40	41	44		RFEF Cup	R32	(Equatorial Guinea) Dorian Jr.	9
2022–23	2ªFed.	12th	34	12	9	13	36	38	45		RFEF Cup	GS	(Spain) Mikel Arzalluz	10
2023–24	2ªFed.	6th	34	12	14	8	32	40	50		RFEF Cup	GS	(Spain) Nané García	9
2024–25	2ªFed.	6th	34	13	11	10	34	35	50	1R			(Spain) Ivan Breñé	8
Season	Div	Pos	Pld	W	D	L	GF	GA	Pts	Cup	Other Competitions		Name(s)	Goal
Season	League									Cup	Other Competitions		Top scorer(s)	
