= 2007 Tercera División play-offs =

Spanish football league play-offs

The 2007 Tercera División play-offs to Segunda División B from Tercera División (Promotion play-offs) were the final playoffs for the promotion from 2006–07 Tercera División to 2007–08 Segunda División B. In some groups four teams took part in the play-off while other groups have only three.

- The teams highlighted in yellow played the Liguilla de Ascenso to Segunda Division B.
- The teams highlighted in red were relegated to Regional Divisions.

Teams - Group 1 (Galicia)	Pts
Deportivo B	72
Coruxo	72
Negreira	68
Villalonga	67
Bergantiños	36
Laracha	31
Cruceiro Hio	31

Teams - Group 2 (Asturias)	Pts
Caudal	83
Lealtad	80
Langreo	74
Sporting B	71
Praviano	37
Mosconia	35
San Martin	29

Teams - Group 3 (Cantabria)	Pts
Noja	87
Escobedo	78
Tropezon	77
Bezana	66
Cayon	33
Textil Escudo	32
Selaya	31

Teams - Group 4 (Basque Country)	Pts
Zalla	76
Amorebieta	70
Portugalete	70
Beasain	69
Santutxu	34
San Ignacio	31
UPV/EHU	30

Teams - Group 5 (Catalonia)	Pts
Reus	82
Girona	80
Sabadell	80
Gavà	72
Barcelona C	42
Prat	40
Peralada	33
Palafrugell	26

Teams - Group 6 (Valencia)	Pts
Denia	88
Villarreal B	83
Torrevieja	81
Ontinyent	79
Sueca	46
Alicante B	41
Oliva	39
Sp. Requena	34

Teams - Group 7 (Madrid)	Pts
RSD Alcalá	71
Getafe B	67
S. Fernando H.	66
Ciempozuelos	66
Pegaso	45
Coslada	44
Santa Ana	42
Colonia Ofigevi	38
Colmenar Viejo	32

Teams - Group 8 (C. y León)	Pts
Mirandés	84
Gª Segoviana	76
Numancia B	73
Real Avila	72
U. Valladolid	31
Benavente	29
La Bañeza	11

Teams - Group 9 (E. Andalusia)	Pts
Granada Atlético	81
Roquetas	79
Poli Ejido B	70
Motril	67
Carolinense	35
Imperio Albolote	26
Maracena	21

Teams-Group10 (W. Andalusia)	Pts
Algeciras	78
Real Betis B	73
Lucena	68
CD S. Fernando	68
Atlético Ceuta	31
Cabecence	29
Chiclana	28

Teams - Group 11 (Balearic I.)	Pts
SD Eivissa	80
Mallorca B	72
Poblense	66
Margaritense	66
Collerense	34
Andratx	31
Sóller	16

Teams - Group 12 (Canary I.)	Pts
Las Palmas B	75
San Isidro	71
Villa Santa Brigida	71
Fuerteventura	69
Huracan	44
Realejos	40
Teror	35
Union Sur Yaiza	33

Teams - Group 13 (Murcia)	Pts
Real Murcia B	89
Mazarrón	88
Caravaca	79
Sangonera At.	79
Molinense	32
San Ginés	27
Beniel	10

Teams - Group 14 (Extremadura)	Pts
Jerez	82
Don Benito	82
Imperio de Mérida	81
Cacereño	75
Castuera	28
Monesterio	20
Moraleja	12

Teams - Group 15 (Navarre)	Pts
Valle de Egües	84
Peña Sport	82
Mutilvera	78
Tudelano	74
Peralta	39
Lagunak	36
Avance	18

Teams - Group 16 (La Rioja)	Pts
Haro	94
ADF Logroñés	91
Calahorra	85
Anguiano	80
Pradejón	29
San Lorenzo	19
Bañuelos	10

Teams - Group 17 (Aragon)	Pts
Real Zaragoza B	88
Utebo	75
Andorra CF	74
Atlético Monzon	72
Alcañiz	37
Zuera	33
Caspe	33
Casetas	22

Teams - Group 18 (Castile-La Mancha)	Pts
Conquense	92
Guadalajara	86
Toledo	69
Almansa	68
La Solana	31
Torpedo 66	31
UD Talavera	10

== Eliminatories ==
- The regular season finish the 27 May 2007.
- The play-offs begin the 2 and 3 of June.

=== Group 1 ===
- 1st Eliminatory:

June 3, 2007 Home Matches:
CF Gavà	3-1	Jerez CF
Poli Ejido B	4-0	CD Lealtad

June 10, 2007 Away Matches:
Jerez CF	1-1	CF Gavà	Agg:2-4
CD Lealtad	2-1	Poli Ejido B	Agg:2-5

- 2nd Eliminatory:

June 17, 2007 Home Matches:
CF Gavà	3-2	Poli Ejido B

June 24, 2007 Away Match:
Poli Ejido B	2-4	CF Gavà	Agg:4-7

  - Promoted to Segunda División B:CF Gavà

=== Group 2 ===
- 1st Eliminatory:

June 3, 2007 Home Matches:
Villalonga CF	0-0	SD Noja
Lucena CF	1-1	AD Fundación Logroñés

June 10, 2007 Away Matches:
SD Noja	1-0	Villalonga CF	Agg:1-0
AD Fundación Logroñés	0-2	Lucena CF	Agg:1-3

- 2nd Eliminatory:

June 17, 2007 Home Matches:
Lucena CF	1-1	SD Noja

June 24, 2007 Away Match:
SD Noja	2-2	Lucena CF	Agg:3-3

  - Promoted to Segunda División B:Lucena CF

=== Group 3 ===
- 1st Eliminatory:

June 3, 2007 Home Matches:
Motril CF	1-0	RSD Alcalá
UD Mutilvera	1-0	Girona FC

June 10, 2007 Away Matches:
RSD Alcalá	3-0	Motril CF	Agg:3-1
Girona FC	4-1	UD Mutilvera	Agg:4-2

- 2nd Eliminatory:

June 17, 2007 Home Matches:
Girona FC	2-1	RSD Alcalá

June 24, 2007 Away Match:
RSD Alcalá	1-2	Girona FC	Agg:2-4

  - Promoted to Segunda División B:Girona FC

=== Group 4 ===
- 1st Eliminatory:

June 3, 2007 Home Matches:
CP Cacereño	1-1	Caudal Deportivo
Sabadell	0-0	RCD Mallorca B

June 10, 2007 Away Matches:
Caudal Deportivo	1-0	CP Cacereño	Agg:2-1
RCD Mallorca B	0-0	Sabadell	Agg:0-0 // Pen:0-3

- 2nd Eliminatory:

June 17, 2007 Home Matches:
Sabadell	4-0	Caudal Deportivo

June 24, 2007 Away Match:
Caudal Deportivo	0-1	Sabadell	Agg:0-5

  - Promoted to Segunda División B:Sabadell

=== Group 5 ===
- 1st Eliminatory:

June 3, 2007 Home Matches:
UD Fuerteventura	2-1	Zalla UC
FC Torrevieja	2-0	Utebo FC

June 10, 2007 Away Matches:
Zalla UC	0-0	UD Fuerteventura	Agg:1-2
Utebo FC	1-0	FC Torrevieja	Agg:1-2

- 2nd Eliminatory:

June 17, 2007 Home Matches:
UD Fuerteventura	1-0	FC Torrevieja

June 24, 2007 Away Match:
FC Torrevieja	2-2	UD Fuerteventura	Agg:2-3

  - Promoted to Segunda División B:UD Fuerteventura

=== Group 6 ===
- 1st Eliminatory:

June 3, 2007 Home Matches:
SD Beasain	2-2	CF Reus Deportiu
Imperio de Mérida CP	1-1	Real Betis B

June 10, 2007 Away Matches:
CF Reus Deportiu	2-1	SD Beasain	Agg:4-3
Real Betis B	1-0	Imperio de Mérida CP	Agg:3-2

- 2nd Eliminatory:

June 17, 2007 Home Matches:
Real Betis B	2-0	CF Reus Deportiu

June 24, 2007 Away Match:
CF Reus Deportiu	2-1	Real Betis B	Agg:2-3

  - Promoted to Segunda División B:Real Betis B

=== Group 7 ===
- 1st Eliminatory:

June 3, 2007 Home Matches:
CD Margaritense	0-1	CD Dénia
San Fernando Henares	1-0	CD Roquetas

June 10, 2007 Away Matches:
CD Dénia	2-0	CD Margaritense	Agg:3-0
CD Roquetas	0-0	San Fernando Henares	Agg:0-1

- 2nd Eliminatory:

June 17, 2007 Home Matches:
San Fernando Henares	0-2	CD Dénia

June 24, 2007 Away Match:
CD Dénia	2-0	San Fernando Henares	Agg:4-0

  - Promoted to Segunda División B:CD Dénia

=== Group 8 ===
- 1st Eliminatory:

June 3, 2007 Home Matches:
Atlético Monzón	3-2	Haro Deportivo
Caravaca CF	3-0	CD San Isidro

June 10, 2007 Away Matches:
Haro Deportivo	1-2	Atlético Monzón	Agg:3-5
CD San Isidro	5-1	Caravaca CF	Agg:5-4

- 2nd Eliminatory:

June 17, 2007 Home Matches:
Atlético Monzón	0-0	CD San Isidro

June 24, 2007 Away Match:
CD San Isidro	3-1	Atlético Monzón	Agg:3-1

  - Promoted to Segunda División B:CD San Isidro

=== Group 9 ===
- 1st Eliminatory:

June 3, 2007 Home Matches:
CD Anguiano	2-1	Deportivo B
Club Portugalete	0-0	CD Don Benito

June 10, 2007 Away Matches:
Deportivo B	4-1	CD Anguiano	Agg:5-3
CD Don Benito	1-0	Club Portugalete	Agg:1-0

- 2nd Eliminatory:

June 17, 2007 Home Matches:
CD Don Benito	0-2	Deportivo B

June 24, 2007 Away Match:
Deportivo B	1-1	CD Don Benito	Agg:3-1

  - Promoted to Segunda División B:Deportivo B

=== Group 10 ===
- 1st Eliminatory:

June 3, 2007 Home Matches:
Sangonera Atlético CF	1-1	Algeciras CF
CD Toledo	2-0	Coruxo FC

June 10, 2007 Away Matches:
Algeciras CF	2-0	Sangonera Atlético CF	Agg:3-1
Coruxo FC	2-2	CD Toledo	Agg:2-4

- 2nd Eliminatory:

June 17, 2007 Home Matches:
CD Toledo	0-1	Algeciras CF

June 24, 2007 Away Match:
Algeciras CF	1-1	CD Toledo	Agg:2-1

  - Promoted to Segunda División B:Algeciras CF

=== Group 11 ===
- 1st Eliminatory:

June 3, 2007 Home Matches:
CD San Fernando	0-0	UB Conquense
SD Negreira	1-0	SD Amorebieta

June 10, 2007 Away Matches:
UB Conquense	2-0	CD San Fernando	Agg:2-0
SD Amorebieta	0-0	SD Negreira	Agg:0-1

- 2nd Eliminatory:

June 17, 2007 Home Matches:
SD Negreira	0-0	UB Conquense

June 24, 2007 Away Match:
UB Conquense	3-0	SD Negreira	Agg:3-0

  - Promoted to Segunda División B:UB Conquense

=== Group 12 ===
- 1st Eliminatory:

June 3, 2007 Home Matches:
CD Ciempozuelos	1-1	Real Murcia B
UD Villa de Santa Brígida	0-0	Gimnástica Segoviana CF

June 10, 2007 Away Matches:
Real Murcia B	0-0	CD Ciempozuelos	Agg:1-1
Gimnástica Segoviana CF	2-2	UD Villa de Santa Brígida	Agg:2-2

- 2nd Eliminatory:

June 17, 2007 Home Matches:
UD Villa de Santa Brígida	0-0	Real Murcia B

June 24, 2007 Away Match:
Real Murcia B	0-1	UD Villa de Santa Brígida	Agg:0-1

  - Promoted to Segunda División B:UD Villa de Santa Brígida

=== Group 13 ===
- 1st Eliminatory:

June 3, 2007 Home Matches:
Ontinyent CF	1-0	Real Zaragoza B
Numancia B	2-2	UM Escobedo

June 10, 2007 Away Matches:
Real Zaragoza B	0-1	Ontinyent CF	Agg:0-2
UM Escobedo	2-3	Numancia B	Agg:4-5

- 2nd Eliminatory:

June 17, 2007 Home Matches:
Ontinyent CF	1-0	Numancia B

June 24, 2007 Away Match:
Numancia B	1-1	Ontinyent CF	Agg:1-2

  - Promoted to Segunda División B:Ontinyent CF

=== Group 14 ===
- 1st Eliminatory:

June 3, 2007 Home Matches:
CD Tudelano	2-2	Las Palmas B
CD Tropezón	0-3	CD Guadalajara

June 10, 2007 Away Matches:
Las Palmas B	1-0	CD Tudelano	Agg:3-2
CD Guadalajara	5-0	CD Tropezón	Agg:8-0

- 2nd Eliminatory:

June 17, 2007 Home Matches:
CD Guadalajara	2-1	Las Palmas B

June 24, 2007 Away Match:
Las Palmas B	1-1	CD Guadalajara	Agg:2-3

  - Promoted to Segunda División B:CD Guadalajara

=== Group 15 ===
- 1st Eliminatory:

June 3, 2007 Home Matches:
Real Ávila CF	2-4	CD Valle de Egüés
UP Langreo	0-0	Mazarrón CF

June 10, 2007 Away Matches:
CD Valle de Egüés	1-2	Real Ávila CF	Agg:5-4
Mazarrón CF	1-0	UP Langreo	Agg:1-0

- 2nd Eliminatory:

June 17, 2007 Home Matches:
Mazarrón CF	6-1	CD Valle de Egüés

June 24, 2007 Away Match:
CD Valle de Egüés	1-3	Mazarrón CF	Agg:2-9

  - Promoted to Segunda División B:Mazarrón CF

=== Group 16 ===
- 1st Eliminatory:

June 3, 2007 Home Matches:
Sporting B	3-0	SE Eivissa-Ibiza
Andorra CF	2-1	Getafe B

June 10, 2007 Away Matches:
SE Eivissa-Ibiza	3-0	Sporting B	Agg:3-3 // Pen: 5-4
Getafe B	3-4	Andorra CF	Agg:4-6

- 2nd Eliminatory:

June 17, 2007 Home Matches:
Andorra CF	0-2	SE Eivissa-Ibiza

June 24, 2007 Away Match:
SE Eivissa-Ibiza	2-1	Andorra CF	Agg:4-1

  - Promoted to Segunda División B:SE Eivissa-Ibiza

=== Group 17 ===
- 1st Eliminatory:

June 3, 2007 Home Matches:
CD Bezana	0-0	Granada Atlético CF
CD Calahorra	1-1	Peña Sport FC

June 10, 2007 Away Matches:
Granada Atlético CF	1-1	CD Bezana	Agg:1-1
Peña Sport FC	3-1	CD Calahorra	Agg:4-2

- 2nd Eliminatory:

June 17, 2007 Home Matches:
CD Bezana	2-1	Peña Sport FC

June 24, 2007 Away Match:
Peña Sport FC	1-0	CD Bezana	Agg:2-2

  - Promoted to Segunda División B:Peña Sport FC

=== Group 18 ===
- 1st Eliminatory:

June 3, 2007 Home Matches:
UD Almansa	0-1	CD Mirandés
UD Poblense	0-4	Villarreal B

June 10, 2007 Away Matches:
CD Mirandés	0-0	UD Almansa	Agg:1-0
Villarreal B	3-0	UD Poblense	Agg:7-0

- 2nd Eliminatory:

June 17, 2007 Home Matches:
Villarreal B	3-1	CD Mirandés

June 24, 2007 Away Match:
CD Mirandés	2-1	Villarreal B	Agg:3-4

  - Promoted to Segunda División B:Villarreal B
