= 2005 Tercera División play-offs =

Portuguese football promotion play-offs in 2005

In Portuguese football, The 2005 Tercera División play-offs to Segunda División B from Tercera División (Promotion play-offs) were the final playoffs for the promotion from 2004–05 Tercera División to 2005–06 Segunda División B. In some groups four teams took part in the play-off while other groups have only three.

- The teams highlighted in yellow played the Liguilla de Ascenso to Segunda Division B.
- The teams highlighted in red were relegated to Regional Divisions.

== Groups A ==
- Teams from Galicia, Asturias, Castile and León and Madrid.

Teams - Group 1 (Galicia)	Pts
Rápido Bouzas	74
SD Negreira	72
CD Lugo	71
Coruxo FC	68
Porriño Industrial FC	35
USD O Grove	34
Verín CF	33

Teams - Group 2 (Asturias)	Pts
Real Oviedo	82
Ribadesella CF	79
CD Mosconia	73
UP Langreo	72
CD Llanes	38
CD San Martín	23
Andés CF	12

Teams - Group 7 (Community of Madrid)	Pts
CD Las Rozas	74
CD Móstoles	72
AD Parla	65
CD Ciempozuelos	63
AD Orcasitas	41
AD Colmenar Viejo	34
AD Torrejón CF	27
CD El Álamo	14

Teams - Group 8 (Castile and León)	Pts
CF Promesas Ponferrada	81
Real Ávila CF	79
Gimnástica Segoviana CF	79
Real Valladolid B	74
SD Gimnástica Medinense	36
CF Cristo Atlético	16
Racing Lermeño CF	11

=== Group A1 ===
- 1st Eliminatory:

June 5, 2005 Home Matches:
Coruxo	0-1	Real Oviedo
Parla	1-0	Real Ávila

June 12, 2005 Away Matches:
Real Oviedo	1-0	Coruxo	Agg:2-0
Real Ávila	3-0	Parla	Agg:3-1

- 2nd Eliminatory:

June 19, 2005 Home Matches:
Real Ávila	1-5	Real Oviedo

June 25, 2005 Away Match:
Real Oviedo	2-0	Real Ávila	Agg:7-1

  - Promoted to Segunda División B:Real Oviedo

=== Group A2 ===
- 1st Eliminatory:

June 5, 2005 Home Matches:
Ciempozuelos	1-0	Promesas Ponferrada
Mosconia	1-1	Negreira

June 12, 2005 Away Matches:
Promesas Ponferrada	1-1	Ciempozuelos	Agg:1-2
Negreira	0-0	Mosconia	Agg:1-1

- 2nd Eliminatory:

June 19, 2005 Home Matches:
Ciempozuelos	0-3	Negreira

June 26, 2005 Away Match:
Negreira	1-2	Ciempozuelos	Agg:2-4

  - Promoted to Segunda División B:Negreira

=== Group A3 ===
- 1st Eliminatory:

June 5, 2005 Home Matches:
Valladolid B	1-0	Las Rozas
Lugo	3-0	Ribadesella

June 12, 2005 Away Matches:
Las Rozas	1-2	Valladolid B	Agg:1-3
Ribadesella	1-0	Lugo	Agg:1-3

- 2nd Eliminatory:

June 19, 2005 Home Matches:
Valladolid B	4-1	Lugo

June 26, 2005 Away Match:
Lugo	0-0	Valladolid B	Agg:1-4

  - Promoted to Segunda División B:Valladolid B

=== Group A4 ===
- 1st Eliminatory:

June 5, 2005 Home Matches:
Langreo	0-0	Rápido Bouzas
Gimnástica Segoviana	0-1	Móstoles

June 12, 2005 Away Matches:
Móstoles	2-1	Gimnástica Segoviana	Agg:2-2
Rápido Bouzas	2-0	Langreo	Agg:2-0

- 2nd Eliminatory:

June 19, 2005 Home Matches:
Móstoles	1-1	Rápido Bouzas

June 26, 2005 Away Match:
Rápido Bouzas	2-2	Móstoles	Agg:3-3

  - Promoted to Segunda División B:Móstoles

== Groups B ==
- Teams from Cantabria, Basque Country, Navarre and Aragon.

Teams - Group 3 (Cantabria)	Pts
R. Santander B	91
Escobedo	70
Barreda	67
Noja	66
Textil Escudo	42
Cultural Guarnizo	34
Atlético Deva	16

Teams - Group 4 (Basque Country)	Pts
Portugalete	83
Zalla	75
Gernika	74
Cultural Durango	70
Alavés C	39
Berio	31
Bruno Villarreal	16

Teams - Group 15 (Navarre)	Pts
Valle de Egüés	68
Mutilvera	67
Beti Onak	56
Iruña	53
Urroztarra	40
Izarra	39
Subiza	22

Teams - Group 16 (La Rioja)	Pts
Calahorra	76
Fund. Logroñés	69
Logroñés	66
Varea	50
Villegas	25
San Cosme	19
Valvanera	15

Teams - Group 17 (Aragon)	Pts
Barbastro	72
Utebo	71
Univ. Zaragoza	69
Sariñena	66
Fraga	40
Alagón	35
Ejea	24
La Fueva	18

=== Group B1 ===
- 1st Eliminatory:

June 5, 2005 Home Matches:
Noja	1-0	Portugalete
Mutilvera	0-1	Utebo

June 12, 2005 Away Matches:
Portugalete	2-0	Noja	Agg:2-1
Utebo	3-2	Mutilvera	Agg:4-2

- 2nd Eliminatory:

June 19, 2005 Home Matches:
Utebo	0-1	Portugalete

June 25, 2005 Away Match:
Portugalete	4-0	Utebo	Agg:5-0

  - Promoted to Segunda División B:Portugalete

=== Group B2 ===
- 1st Eliminatory:

June 5, 2005 Home Matches:
Cultural Durango	1-0	Valle de Egüés
Universidad Zaragoza	1-0	Escobedo

June 12, 2005 Away Matches:
Valle de Egüés	0-0	Cultural Durango	Agg:0-1
Escobedo	2-2	Universidad Zaragoza	Agg:2-3

- 2nd Eliminatory:

June 19, 2005 Home Matches:
Cultural Durango	1-1	Universidad Zaragoza

June 26, 2005 Away Match:
Universidad Zaragoza	4-1	Cultural Durango	Agg:5-2

  - Promoted to Segunda División B:Cultural Durango

=== Group B3 ===
- 1st Eliminatory:

June 5, 2005 Home Matches:
Barreda	1-2	Zalla
Fundación Logroñés	0-1	Barbastro

June 12, 2005 Away Matches:
Zalla	6-0	Barreda	Agg:8-1
Barbastro	1-1	Fundación Logroñés	Agg:2-1

- 2nd Eliminatory:

June 19, 2005 Home Matches:
Zalla	1-0	Barbastro

June 26, 2005 Away Match:
Barbastro	0-0	Zalla	Agg:0-1

  - Promoted to Segunda División B:Zalla

=== Group B4 ===
- 1st Eliminatory:

June 5, 2005 Home Matches:
Sariñena	0-1	Racing B
Gernika	1-2	Calahorra

June 12, 2005 Away Matches:
Racing B	2-0	Sariñena	Agg:3-0
Calahorra	1-2	Gernika	Agg:3-3//Pen:1-4

- 2nd Eliminatory:

June 19, 2005 Home Matches:
Gernika	0-2	Racing B

June 26, 2005 Away Match:
Racing B	2-2	Gernika	Agg:4-2

  - Promoted to Segunda División B:Racing B

== Groups C ==
- Teams from Catalonia, Valencian Community, Balearic Islands and Region of Murcia.

Teams - Group 5 (Catalonia)	Pts
CE L'Hospitalet	80
CE Mataró	72
UE Sant Andreu	72
CF Reus Deportiu	65
UE Vilassar	34
CD Banyoles	29
UE Tàrrega	24

Teams - Group 6 (Valencian Community)	Pts
Valencia CF B	73
CF Gandía	66
CD Eldense	65
Santa Pola CF	63
Paterna CF	37
Torrellano CF	36
CD Acero	22

Teams - Group 11 (Balearic Islands)	Pts
CD Constancia	87
CD Manacor	75
PD Santa Eulalia	72
CF Sporting Mahonés	71
CE Campos	32
CD Atlético Baleares	32
SD Portmany	22

Teams - Group 13 (Region of Murcia)	Pts
Águilas CF	76
Sangonera Atlético CF	75
AD Mar Menor-San Javier	75
Mazarrón CF	74
CD Cieza	34
U.C.A.M	32
CD Bala Azul	13

=== Group C1 ===
- 1st Eliminatory:

June 5, 2005 Home Matches:
Mazarrón	1-0	Valencia Mestalla
Sant Andreu	1-2	Manacor

June 12, 2005 Away Matches:
Valencia Mestalla	2-1	Mazarrón	Agg:2-2
Manacor	0-2	Sant Andreu	Agg:2-3

- 2nd Eliminatory:

June 19, 2005 Home Matches:
Mazarrón	2-1	Sant Andreu

June 26, 2005 Away Match:
Sant Andreu	2-0	Mazarrón	Agg:3-2

  - Promoted to Segunda División B:Sant Andreu

=== Group C2 ===
- 1st Eliminatory:

June 5, 2005 Home Matches:
Sporting Mahonés	2-2	L'Hospitalet
Eldense	1-0	Sangonera Atlético

June 12, 2005 Away Matches:
L'Hospitalet	3-1	Sporting Mahonés	Agg:5-2
Sangonera Atlético	2-0	Eldense	Agg:2-1

- 2nd Eliminatory:

June 19, 2005 Home Matches:
Sangonera Atlético	1-2	L'Hospitalet

June 26, 2005 Away Match:
L'Hospitalet	3-0	Sangonera Atlético	Agg:5-1

  - Promoted to Segunda División B:L'Hospitalet

=== Group C3 ===
- 1st Eliminatory:

June 5, 2005 Home Matches:
Mar Menor	1-1	Gandía
Reus	1-0	Constancia

June 12, 2005 Away Matches:
Gandía	2-2	Mar Menor	Agg:3-3
Constancia	0-2	Reus	Agg:0-3

- 2nd Eliminatory:

June 19, 2005 Home Matches:
Reus	2-0	Mar Menor

June 26, 2005 Away Match:
Mar Menor	3-4	Reus	Agg:6-3

  - Promoted to Segunda División B:Reus

=== Group C4 ===
- 1st Eliminatory:

June 5, 2005 Home Matches:
Santa Pola	0-3	Águilas
Santa Eulàlia	0-1	Mataró

June 12, 2005 Away Matches:
Águilas	2-2	Santa Pola	Agg:5-2
Mataró	0-0	Santa Eulàlia	Agg:1-0

- 2nd Eliminatory:

June 19, 2005 Home Matches:
Mataró	1-1	Águilas

June 26, 2005 Away Match:
Águilas	1-0	Mataró	Agg:2-1

  - Promoted to Segunda División B:Águilas

== Groups D ==
- Teams from Andalusia, Extremadura, and Castile-La Mancha.

Teams - Group 9 (East Andalusia)	Pts
CD Baza	85
Torredonjimeno CF	80
CD Roquetas	74
CD Alhaurino	74
Atlético Mancha Real	39
CP Granada 74	36
CF Rusadir	6

Teams - Group 10 (West Andalusia)	Pts
CD Villanueva	82
UD Los Barrios	76
Racing Portuense	67
Balompédica Linense	67
AD Cerro del Águila	46
CA Antoniano	44
RCD Nueva Sevilla	36
AD Cartaya	29

Teams - Group 14 (Extremadura)	Pts
Mérida UD	93
CF Villanovense	86
AD Cerro Reyes	86
Moralo CP	76
CD Badajoz B	32
CD Grabasa Burguillos	25
Arroyo CP	19

Teams - Group 17 (Castile-La Mancha)	Pts
UD Almansa	77
Albacete Balompié B	74
CF Gimnástico Alcázar	72
UD Talavera	71
CD Torrijos	38
AD Torpedo 66	35
Hellín Deportivo	17

=== Group D1 ===
- 1st Eliminatory:

June 5, 2005 Home Matches:
Roquetas	1-1	Albacete B
Balompédica Linense	2-1	Mérida

June 12, 2005 Away Matches:
Albacete B	1-3	Roquetas	Agg:2-4
Mérida	1-0	Balompédica Linense	Agg:2-2

- 2nd Eliminatory:

June 19, 2005 Home Matches:
Roquetas	1-3	Mérida

June 26, 2005 Away Match:
Mérida	0-1	Roquetas	Agg:3-2

  - Promoted to Segunda División B:Mérida

=== Group D2 ===
- 1st Eliminatory:

June 5, 2005 Home Matches:
Racing Portuense	1-5	Villanovense
Talavera	2-3	Baza

June 12, 2005 Away Matches:
Villanovense	2-2	Racing Portuense	Agg:7-3
Baza	1-2	Talavera	Agg:4-4

- 2nd Eliminatory:

June 19, 2005 Home Matches:
Villanovense	1-2	Baza

June 26, 2005 Away Match:
Baza	4-1	Villanovense	Agg:6-2

  - Promoted to Segunda División B:Baza

=== Group D3 ===
- 1st Eliminatory:

June 5, 2005 Home Matches:
Gimnástico Alcázar	3-1	Torredonjimeno
Moralo	2-1	Villanueva

June 12, 2005 Away Matches:
Torredonjimeno	3-1	Gimnástico Alcázar	Agg:4-4//Pen:3-1
Villanueva	2-0	Moralo	Agg:3-2

- 2nd Eliminatory:

June 19, 2005 Home Matches:
Torredonjimeno	2-4	Villanueva

June 26, 2005 Away Match:
Villanueva	1-0	Torredonjimeno	Agg:5-2

  - Promoted to Segunda División B:Villanueva

=== Group D4 ===
- 1st Eliminatory:

June 5, 2005 Home Matches:
Alhaurino	1-1	Almansa
Cerro Reyes	0-0	Los Barrios

June 12, 2005 Away Matches:
Almansa	3-1	Alhaurino	Agg:4-2
Los Barrios	2-2	Cerro Reyes	Agg:2-2

- 2nd Eliminatory:

June 19, 2005 Home Matches:
Cerro Reyes	0-3	Almansa

June 26, 2005 Away Match:
Almansa	3-1	Cerro Reyes	Agg:6-1

  - Promoted to Segunda División B:Cerro Reyes
