= Prats (surname) =

Prats is a Spanish surname. Notable people with the surname include:

- Abdón Prats (born 1992), Spanish footballer
- Camille Prats (born 1985), Filipino actress
- Carlos Prats (1915–1974), Chilean politician and military officer
- David Prats (born 1979), Spanish football coach and former player
- Esteban Prats (1873–?), Cuban baseball player
- Ivelisse Prats Ramírez, Dominican politician
- Jaime Prats (1883–1946), Cuban musician and composer
- Joan Prats (1891–1970), Catalan art promoter
- John Prats (born 1984), Filipino actor
- Jorge Luis Prats (born 1956), Cuban pianist
- Juan Prats (c.1800–ca.1870), Spanish landowner and politician, mayor of Ponce, Puerto Rico
- Matías Prats Cañete (1913–2004), Spanish journalist and newscaster
- Matías Prats Luque (born 1952), Spanish journalist and newscaster, son of Matías Prats Cañete
- Miguel Prats, Cuban baseball player
- Óscar Prats (born 1989), Spanish footballer
- Pachuco Prats (1902–1976), Spanish international footballer and manager
- Pol Prats (born 1999), Spanish footballer
- Roberto Prats (born 1966), Puerto Rican politician
- Rodrigo Prats (1909–1980), Cuban musician and composer, son of Jaime Prats
- Toni Prats (born 1971), Spanish footballer
- Úrsula Prats (born 1959), Mexican actress

== See also ==
- Prats (disambiguation)
- Pratas, Portuguese surname
