= 2008 Tercera División play-offs =

Spanish football league play-offs

The 2008 Tercera División play-offs to Segunda División B from Tercera División (Promotion play-offs) were the final playoffs for the promotion from 2007–08 Tercera División to 2008–09 Segunda División B. In some groups four teams took part in the play-off while other groups have only three.

- The teams highlighted in yellow played the Play-Offs to Segunda División B.
- The teams highlighted in red were relegated to Divisiones Regionales.
- All groups as 38 of 38 rounds.

Teams - Group 1 (Galicia)	Pts
SD Ciudad de Santiago	82
CD Lalín	78
Narón Balompé Piñeiros	71
Coruxo FC	66
Betanzos CF	41
CD Ourense B	21
Club Lemos	20

Teams - Group 2 (Asturias)	Pts
Real Oviedo	88
Sporting Gijón B	72
UP Langreo	70
AD Universidad Oviedo	70
Real Tapia	33
Club Hispano	20
SD Colloto	16

Teams - Group 3 (Cantabria)	Pts
RS Gimnástica Torrelavega	100
Racing Santander B	88
SD Noja	78
UM Escobedo	77
AD Trasmiera	34
SD Gama	28
SD Buelna	19

Teams - Group 4 (Basque C.)	Pts
Club Portugalete	69
Gernika Club	68
Amurrio Club	67
SD Zamudio	66
SD San Pedro	41
Tolosa CF	39
CD Vitoria	23

Teams - Group 5(Catalonia)	Pts
FC Barcelona B	83
UE Sant Andreu	82
CF Reus Deportiu	65
FC Santboià	60
CF Igualada	37
CE Manresa	35
CD Masnou	21

Teams - Group 6 (Valencia)	Pts
UD Alzira	79
Valencia CF Mestalla	75
CF La Nucía	72
Catarroja CF	72
CD Tháder	45
CD Olímpic de Xàtiva	43
Elche CF-Ilicitano	33
CD Alone de Guardamar	31

Teams - Group 7 (Madrid)	Pts
CD Ciempozuelos	81
CDA Navalcarnero	77
RSD Alcalá	76
CD Móstoles	74
CD San Fernando Henares	42
CD Humanes	32
AD Villaviciosa de Odón	30
AD Torrejón CF	29
AD Unión Adarve	28

Teams - Group 8 (C. y León)	Pts
CD Mirandés	95
Gimnástica Segoviana CF	74
Real Ávila CF	72
Arandina CF	63
CF Cristo Atlético	37
Burgos B	37
SD Hullera Vasco-Leonesa	19

Teams - Group 9 (E. Andalusia)	Pts
CD Roquetas	85
Antequera CF	79
Granada Atlético CF	72
Vélez CF	68
UD Fuengirola-L.B.	46
Torredonjimeno CF	36
Alhaurín de la Torre CF	31
Peña Ciudad Melilla CF	9

Teams - Group 10 (W. Andalusia)	Pts
CD San Fernando	78
Puerto Real CF	70
RB Linense	69
CD Villanueva	67
AD Cerro del Águila	38
Arcos CF	34
Xerez B	28

Teams - Group 11 (Balearic I.)	Pts
CD Atlético Baleares	84
RCD Mallorca B	83
PD Santa Eulalia	77
CD Santanyí	75
CD Margaritense	26
CD Serverense	26
Atlético Villa-Carlos	14

Teams - Group 12 (Canary I.)	Pts
Atlético Granadilla	74
UD Las Palmas B	73
UD Gáldar	73
Castillo CF	68
UD Balos	37
UD Ibarra	34
Atlético Arona	21

Teams - Group 13 (Murcia)	Pts
CA Ciudad Lorquí	93
Sangonera Atlético CF	79
Real Murcia B	79
Caravaca CF	76
CO Totana	29
CD Alquerías	22
AD Ceutí Atlético	13

Teams - Group 14(Extremadura)	Pts
CD Don Benito	82
AD Cerro de Reyes	78
CF Villanovense	74
Jerez CF	70
Atlético Pueblonuevo	38
CD Santa Amalia	36
SP Villafranca	27

Teams - Group 15 (Navarre)	Pts
CD Izarra	81
UD Multilvera	74
CD Iruña	74
CD Tudelano	70
CA Artajonés	30
CD Zarramonza	29
CD Burladés	29

Teams - Group 16 (La Rioja)	Pts
CD Alfaro	88
CD Anguiano	86
Haro Deportivo	84
CD Calahorra	82
CD Vianés	30
CF Rapid de Murillo	29
CF Ciudad de Alfaro	14

Teams - Group 17 (Aragon)	Pts
SD Ejea	93
UD Barbastro	88
CD Teruel	84
Atlético Monzón	81
CF Figueruelas	37
CF Illueca	33
CD Peñas Oscenses	29
CF Jacetano	28

Teams - Group 18 (Castile-La Mancha)	Pts
CD Toledo	82
CP Villarrobledo	72
UD Almansa	68
Tomelloso CF	66
CD Torrijos	34
CD Miguelturreño	30
CD Cobeja	23

== Eliminatories ==
- The regular season finished the 18 May 2008.
- The play-offs began the 24 and 25 of May.

=== Group 1 ===
- 1st Eliminatory:

25 May 2008 Home Matches:
Vélez CF	1-0	CD Toledo
Reus Deportiu	1-0	Sangonera Atlético

1 June 2008 Away Matches:
CD Toledo	1-0	Vélez CF	Agg:1-1//Pen:5-4
Sangonera Atlético	3-1	Reus Deportiu	Agg:3-2

- 2nd Eliminatory:

8 June 2008 Home Matches:
Sangonera Atlético	1-1	CD Toledo

15 June 2008 Away Match:
CD Toledo	1-2	Sangonera Atlético	Agg:2-3

  - Promoted to Segunda División B:Sangonera Atlético

=== Group 2 ===
- 1st Eliminatory:

25 May 2008 Home Matches:
Castillo CF	0-0	FC Barcelona B
UP Langreo	2-1	UD Barbastro

1 June 2008 Away Matches:
FC Barcelona B	6-0	Castillo CF	Agg:6-0
UD Barbastro	3-0	UP Langreo	Agg:4-2

- 2nd Eliminatory:

8 June 2008 Home Matches:
UD Barbastro	0-2	FC Barcelona B

15 June 2008 Away Match:
FC Barcelona B	1-0	UD Barbastro	Agg:3-0

  - Promoted to Segunda División B:FC Barcelona B

=== Group 3 ===
- 1st Eliminatory:

25 May 2008 Home Matches:
Atlético Monzón	2-0	Ciudad Santiago
UD Almansa	2-0	RCD Mallorca B

1 June 2008 Away Matches:
Ciudad Santiago	3-0	Atlético Monzón	Agg:3-2
RCD Mallorca B	1-2	UD Almansa	Agg:1-4

- 2nd Eliminatory:

8 June 2008 Home Matches:
UD Almansa	2-1	Ciudad Santiago

15 June 2008 Away Match:
Ciudad Santiago	4-2	UD Almansa	Agg:5-4

  - Promoted to Segunda División B:Ciudad Santiago

=== Group 4 ===
- 1st Eliminatory:

25 May 2008 Home Matches:
CD Calahorra	1-2	CD San Fernando
Amurrio Club	0-1	CD Lalín

1 June 2008 Away Matches:
CD San Fernando	0-1	CD Calahorra	Agg:2-2
CD Lalín	1-2	Amurrio Club	Agg:2-2

- 2nd Eliminatory:

8 June 2008 Home Matches:
Amurrio Club	0-0	CD San Fernando

15 June 2008 Away Match:
CD San Fernando	3-0	Amurrio Club	Agg:3-0

  - Promoted to Segunda División B:CD San Fernando

=== Group 5 ===
- 1st Eliminatory:

24 May 2008 Home Matches:
CD Iruña	0-2	Racing Santander B
CD Villanueva	2-0	Club Portugalete

1 June 2008 Away Matches:
Racing Santander B	0-0	CD Iruña	Agg:2-0
Club Portugalete	1-0	CD Villanueva	Agg:1-2

- 2nd Eliminatory:

8 June 2008 Home Matches:
CD Villanueva	0-1	Racing Santander B

15 June 2008 Away Match:
Racing Santander B	4-1	CD Villanueva	Agg:5-1

  - Promoted to Segunda División B:Racing Santander B

=== Group 6 ===
- 1st Eliminatory:

24 May and 25 May 2008 Home Matches:
Coruxo FC	0-2	UD Alzira
RSD Alcalá	1-0	Cerro Reyes

1 June 2008 Away Matches:
UD Alzira	2-2	Coruxo FC	Agg:4-2
Cerro Reyes	2-1	RSD Alcalá	Agg:2-2

- 2nd Eliminatory:

8 June 2008 Home Matches:
RSD Alcalá	0-0	UD Alzira

15 June 2008 Away Match:
UD Alzira	1-0	RSD Alcalá	Agg:1-0

  - Promoted to Segunda División B:UD Alzira

=== Group 7 ===
- 1st Eliminatory:

24 May 2008 Home Matches:
Jerez CF	1-1	CD Ciempozuelos
CF La Nucía	1-1	Las Palmas B

1 June 2008 Away Matches:
CD Ciempozuelos	4-0	Jerez CF	Agg:5-1
Las Palmas B	2-1	CF La Nucía	Agg:3-2

- 2nd Eliminatory:

8 June 2008 Home Matches:
Las Palmas B	0-0	CD Ciempozuelos

15 June 2008 Away Match:
CD Ciempozuelos	2-3	Las Palmas B	Agg:2-3

  - Promoted to Segunda División B:Las Palmas B

=== Group 8 ===
- 1st Eliminatory:

24 May and 25 May 2008 Home Matches:
Catarroja CF	2-0	CD Roquetas
CD Teruel	0-1	CP Villarrobledo

1 June 2008 Away Matches:
CD Roquetas	2-0	Catarroja CF	Agg:2-2//Pen:5-3
CP Villarrobledo	0-4	CD Teruel	Agg:1-4

- 2nd Eliminatory:

8 June 2008 Home Matches:
CD Teruel	1-2	CD Roquetas

15 June 2008 Away Match:
CD Roquetas	1-1	CD Teruel	Agg:3-2

  - Promoted to Segunda División B:CD Roquetas

=== Group 9 ===
- 1st Eliminatory:

24 May and 25 May 2008 Home Matches:
Narón Balompé	0-0	Antequera CF
Caravaca CF	4-1	Real Oviedo

1 June 2008 Away Matches:
Antequera CF	4-1	Narón Balompé	Agg:4-1
Real Oviedo	4-2	Caravaca CF	Agg:5-6

- 2nd Eliminatory:

8 June 2008 Home Matches:
Caravaca CF	0-0	Antequera CF

15 June 2008 Away Match:
Antequera CF	2-1	Caravaca CF	Agg:2-1

  - Promoted to Segunda División B:Antequera CF

=== Group 10 ===
- 1st Eliminatory:

25 May 2008 Home Matches:
Real Murcia B	0-0	Puerto Real CF
CD Tudelano	4-0	CD Alfaro

1 June 2008 Away Matches:
Puerto Real CF	0-1	Real Murcia B	Agg:0-1
CD Alfaro	3-1	CD Tudelano	Agg:3-5

- 2nd Eliminatory:

8 June 2008 Home Matches:
CD Tudelano	2-3	Real Murcia B

15 June 2008 Away Match:
Real Murcia B	3-1	CD Tudelano	Agg:6-3

  - Promoted to Segunda División B:Real Murcia B

=== Group 11 ===
- 1st Eliminatory:

25 May 2008 Home Matches:
Haro Deportivo	1-1	UE Sant Andreu
Arandina CF	1-0	SD Ejea

1 June 2008 Away Matches:
UE Sant Andreu	1-0	Haro Deportivo	Agg:2-1
SD Ejea	1-1	Arandina CF	Agg:1-2

- 2nd Eliminatory:

8 June 2008 Home Matches:
Arandina CF	0-2	UE Sant Andreu

15 June 2008 Away Match:
UE Sant Andreu	3-0	Arandina CF	Agg:5-0

  - Promoted to Segunda División B:UE Sant Andreu

=== Group 12 ===
- 1st Eliminatory:

25 May 2008 Home Matches:
Real Ávila CF	1-3	Valencia Mestalla
FC Santboià	0-0	Gimnástica Torrelavega

1 June 2008 Away Matches:
Valencia Mestalla	0-2	Real Ávila CF	Agg:3-3
Gimnástica Torrelavega	1-1	FC Santboià	Agg:1-1

- 2nd Eliminatory:

8 June 2008 Home Matches:
FC Santboià	1-2	Valencia Mestalla

15 June 2008 Away Match:
Valencia Mestalla	1-0	FC Santboià	Agg:3-1

  - Promoted to Segunda División B:Valencia Mestalla

=== Group 13 ===
- 1st Eliminatory:

25 May 2008 Home Matches:
Universidad Oviedo	1-1	Atlético Baleares
UD Gáldar	2-2	Gernika Club

1 June 2008 Away Matches:
Atlético Baleares	2-1	Universidad Oviedo	Agg:3-2
Gernika Club	2-0	UD Gáldar	Agg:4-2

- 2nd Eliminatory:

8 June 2008 Home Matches:
Gernika Club	0-0	Atlético Baleares

15 June 2008 Away Match:
Atlético Baleares	2-0	Gernika Club	Agg:2-0

  - Promoted to Segunda División B:Atlético Baleares

=== Group 14 ===
- 1st Eliminatory:

25 May 2008 Home Matches:
CF Villanovense	2-1	Gimnástica Segoviana
Tomelloso CF	1-1	Ciudad Lorquí

1 June 2008 Away Matches:
Gimnástica Segoviana	1-1	CF Villanovense	Agg:2-3
Ciudad Lorquí	2-1	Tomelloso CF	Agg:3-2

- 2nd Eliminatory:

8 June 2008 Home Matches:
CF Villanovense	0-0	Ciudad Lorquí

15 June 2008 Away Match:
Ciudad Lorquí	4-1	CF Villanovense	Agg:4-1

  - Promoted to Segunda División B:Ciudad Lorquí

=== Group 15 ===
- 1st Eliminatory:

25 May 2008 Home Matches:
Granada Atlético CF	1-0	CDA Navalcarnero
UM Escobedo	2-2	Atlético Granadilla

1 June 2008 Away Matches:
CDA Navalcarnero	1-0	Granada Atlético CF	Agg:1-1//Pen:5-4
Atlético Granadilla	0-0	UM Escobedo	Agg:2-2

- 2nd Eliminatory:

8 June 2008 Home Matches:
CDA Navalcarnero	3-0	Atlético Granadilla

15 June 2008 Away Match:
Atlético Granadilla	1-0	CDA Navalcarnero	Agg:1-3

  - Promoted to Segunda División B:CDA Navalcarnero

=== Group 16 ===
- 1st Eliminatory:

24 May and 25 May 2008 Home Matches:
CD Santanyí	0-2	CD Mirandés
Balompédica Linense	1-0	CD Anguiano

1 June 2008 Away Matches:
CD Mirandés	1-0	CD Santanyí	Agg:3-0
CD Anguiano	2-1	Balompédica Linense	Agg:2-2

- 2nd Eliminatory:

8 June 2008 Home Matches:
Balompédica Linense	1-1	CD Mirandés

15 June 2008 Away Match:
CD Mirandés	3-3	Balompédica Linense	Agg:4-4

  - Promoted to Segunda División B:Balompédica Linense

=== Group 17 ===
- 1st Eliminatory:

25 May 2008 Home Matches:
CD Móstoles	1-0	CD Don Benito
Santa Eulàlia	2-0	UD Mutilvera

1 June 2008 Away Matches:
CD Don Benito	3-0	CD Móstoles	Agg:3-1
UD Mutilvera	1-1	Santa Eulàlia	Agg:1-3

- 2nd Eliminatory:

8 June 2008 Home Matches:
Santa Eulàlia	1-0	CD Don Benito

15 June 2008 Away Match:
CD Don Benito	0-0	Santa Eulàlia	Agg:0-1

  - Promoted to Segunda División B:Santa Eulàlia

=== Group 18 ===
- 1st Eliminatory:

24 May 2008 Home Matches:
Zamudio SD	2-1	CD Izarra
SD Noja	3-1	Sporting de Gijón B

1 June 2008 Away Matches:
CD Izarra	0-2	Zamudio SD	Agg:1-4
Sporting de Gijón B	2-0	SD Noja	Agg:3-3

- 2nd Eliminatory:

8 June 2008 Home Matches:
Zamudio SD	0-3	Sporting de Gijón B

15 June 2008 Away Match:
Sporting de Gijón B	0-0	Zamudio SD	Agg:3-0

  - Promoted to Segunda División B:Sporting de Gijón B
