= José Ituarte =

José Ituarte may refer to:

- Joseba Ituarte (born 1970), Spanish professional footballer
- José Moscardó Ituarte (1878 – 1956), Spanish military Governor of Toledo Province during the Spanish Civil War
- José Luis Ituarte, Spanish racing driver
