= Nandinho (footballer, born 1973) =

Portuguese footballer

Personal information
- Full name: Fernando Manuel de Jesus Santos
- Date of birth: 17 March 1973 (age 53)
- Place of birth: Porto, Portugal
- Height: 1.80 m (5 ft 11 in)
- Position: Winger

Youth career
- 1984–1985: Vitória Porto
- 1985–1986: Lapa
- 1987–1991: Candal

Senior career*
Years	Team	Apps	(Gls)
1991–1992	Candal		
1992–1994	Ataense		
1994–1995	Castêlo Maia		
1995–1998	Salgueiros	89	(21)
1998–1999	Benfica	4	(1)
1999	→ Alverca (loan)	17	(5)
1999–2002	Vitória Guimarães	43	(0)
2002–2006	Gil Vicente	114	(13)
2007	Leixões	8	(0)
Total		275	(40)

International career
1996	Portugal U21	3	(0)

Managerial career
- 2012–2015: Gil Vicente (youth)
- 2015–2016: Gil Vicente
- 2016–2017: Famalicão
- 2018–2019: Gil Vicente
- 2019–2020: Almería B
- 2020: Almería (assistant)
- 2020–2021: Almería B
- 2022–2023: B-SAD
- 2023–2024: Al-Ahli
- 2024–2025: Al-Bukiryah
- 2025-: Al-Muharraq
- * Club domestic league appearances and goals

Fernando Manuel de Jesus Santos (born 17 March 1973), known as Nandinho, is a Portuguese former professional footballer who played as a right winger, currently a manager.

He amassed Primeira Liga totals of 257 matches and 41 goals over 11 seasons, representing mainly in the competition Gil Vicente (four years).

== Playing career ==
Born in Porto, Nandinho played amateur football until the age of 22, signing with Primeira Liga club S.C. Salgueiros in 1995 from SC Castêlo da Maia. He scored a career-best 13 goals in 30 games in his third season, helping his team to the eighth position.

Subsequently, Nandinho signed for S.L. Benfica – against which he had previously scored – as Graeme Souness was the manager. As several British players were brought in, he was eventually deemed surplus to requirements, finishing his debut campaign with farm team F.C. Alverca, where he netted a hat-trick in a 3–2 home win against Sporting CP on 17 April 1999.

Nandinho joined Vitória S.C. in summer 1999, being rarely played by Paulo Autuori but featuring more under new coach Álvaro Magalhães. He retired in June 2007 at 34, after spells with Gil Vicente F.C. in the top flight and Leixões S.C. in the Segunda Liga.

== Coaching career ==
On 28 May 2015, after several years in charge of the youth sides, Nandinho was chosen as José Mota's successor at the helm of Gil's first team, recently relegated from the top division. He left the post on 11 May of the following year, taking over at F.C. Famalicão on 17 October.

Nandinho resigned on 2 April 2017, with the club near the relegation places in the second tier. He returned to Gil Vicente in the 2018 off-season, achieving promotion without playing and being relieved of his duties.

Nandinho first moved abroad on 16 October 2019, replacing the dismissed Esteban Navarro at UD Almería B. The following 26 June, he was named assistant manager of the first team until the end of the season, with Mário Silva becoming the head coach, but returned to his previous role on 27 July as Silva was dismissed.

On 24 August 2022, Nandinho was hired by B-SAD, who had dismissed José Maria Pratas three games into the second-division campaign. He was dismissed the following 31 January, having taken 15 points in 14 games for the 16th-placed team, despite awaiting the quarter-finals of the Taça de Portugal.

Subsequently, Nandinho worked in the Bahraini Premier League with Al-Ahli Club (Manama) and the Saudi First Division League with Al-Bukiryah FC.

== Managerial statistics ==
As of match played 1 July 2020

Managerial record by team and tenure
Team	Nat	From	To	Record								Ref
Team	Nat	From	To	G	W	D	L	GF	GA	GD	Win %	Ref
Gil Vicente	(Portugal)	28 May 2015	15 May 2016	54	20	16	18	71	68	+3	37.04	
Famalicão	(Portugal)	17 October 2016	2 April 2017	24	8	7	9	25	25	+0	33.33	
Gil Vicente	(Portugal)	28 June 2018	13 May 2019	36	23	4	9	66	31	+35	63.89	
Almería B	(Spain)	16 October 2019	26 June 2020	21	12	7	2	46	18	+28	57.14	
Career Total				135	63	34	38	208	142	+66	46.67	—
