= Ivelisse (name) =

Ivelisse is a feminine given name. Notable people with the name include:

- Ivelisse Echevarría (born 1956), Puerto Rican softball player
- Ivelisse Prats Ramírez (1931–2020), Dominican politician
- Ivelisse Vélez (born 1987), Puerto Rican professional wrestler
