= Basque Swimming Federation =

Basque sports organization

Basque Swimming Federation Federación Vasca de Natación-Euskal Igeriketa Erakundea
- Sport: Swimming, water polo, synchronized swimming, diving, open water swimming
- Jurisdiction: Basque Country
- Abbreviation: FVN-EIF
- Founded: 1985
- Affiliation: Royal Spanish Swimming Federation (RFEN)
- Headquarters: Bilbao, Spain
- President: Javier Sáez Gómez
- Secretary: Santiago Gil

Official website
- eif-fvn.org

The Basque Swimming Federation (Basque: Euskal Igeriketa Erakundea, EIF; Spanish: Federación Vasca de Natación, FVN) is the body responsible for managing swimming sport in the Basque Country autonomous region. Its offices are in Bilbao.

The federation integrates the three regional federations - the Biscayan Swimming Federation (FBN-BIF) of Biscay, the Gipuzkoa Swimming Federation (GIF) of Gipuzkoa and the Álava Swimming Federation (FAN) of Álava, being represented by the Basque organization.

The Basque Swimming Federation is part of the Royal Spanish Swimming Federation (RFEN).

== History ==
In 1943, Maurice Larribot, as a swimmer and later a sports manager, managed to The Biscayan and Guipuzcoan swimmers end up understanding each other and come together to found the Basque Swimming Federation.

A year later, 1944, the total unification of Basque-Navarre swimming was achieved, when Alava joined them, at the same time as the Basque Association of Referees was founded. That same year, the Judizmendi Swimming Club settled in the Polvorin swimming pool in Alava, and organized the Basque-Navarrese "Regional" Championships there. In 1975 the Basque-Navarra Federation was dissolved, as both became independent from each other, becoming the Basque Federation and the Navarra Federation.

In 1985, the Federation was legally established, establishing itself with the legal form of a Basque sports association. The chairperson of the Basque Swimming Federation was Javier Sáez, who was also the vicepresident of the Royal Spanish Swimming Federation (RFEN). He was the chairperson from 2013 to 2024.

== Purpose ==
The Basque Swimming Federation's purpose is to promote, organise and authorise swimming competitions across the Basque Country autonomous region.

== Disciplines ==
The swimming discipline includes the following disciplines:

- Swimming
- Long-distance swimming
- Water polo
- Synchronized swimming
- Diving
- Lifesaving

== Clubs affiliated to the Basque Swimming Federation ==
Clubs integrated into the Basque Swimming Federation:

- C.I. Laudio
- C.N. Judizmendi
- C.N. Menditxo
- C.N. Urgain
- C.N. Zadorra
- Laudata Urpolo
- Urdantza
- Amorebieta I.K.T.
- Astola I.K.T.
- Atxondo I.K.T.
- Axpoandi Bermeo IK
- Bilbao Aingeruak IK
- C. Askartza
- C. Sincro Sestao
- C. Sincro Urbarri
- C.D. Bilbao
- C.D.N. Meatzaldea
- C.N. Barakaldo
- C.N. Basauri
- C.N. Maristas
- C.N. Mungia
- C.N. Santurtzi
- C.N. Sestao
- C.N. Tabira
- CN Zalla Zurkide
- D.N. Portugalete
- Galdakao I.T.
- Ganguren I.T.
- Getxo IBKE
- Igorre IGT
- Kikunbera IK
- Kosnoaga I.K.T.
- Lauro Ikastola
- Leioa WLB
- Ondarru I.T.
- Sopela I.T.
- Waterpolo Sestao
- Swim Camp Getxo
- Ur Irekiak Galea
- Aloña mendi K.E.
- Atletico S.S.
- Bergara I.E.
- Bidasoa XXI
- Buruntzaldea IKT
- CD Kairoscore
- Donostia Urpolo
- Easo C.N.
- Eibar Igerixan
- Esepetres
- Fortuna C.D.
- Hernani K.E.
- Igartza Ike
- Izarraitz I.E.
- Konporta KE
- Legazpi
- Ordizia I.E.
- Taosa IT
- Tolosaldea
- Urbat
- Urgara Txingudi
- Zarautz K.E.
- Zubiaurre I.E.

== President ==
- Manuel Isuskiza (2004-2013)
- Javier Sáez Gómez (2013-2024)

== General Secretary ==
- Santiago Gil

== See also ==
- Basque Football Federation
- Club Deportivo Bilbao
- Deportiva Náutica Portugalete
- Iván Martín Seoane
