= Pratas =

Pratas is a Portuguese surname. Notable people with the surname include:

- António Pratas, after whom the António Pratas Trophy was named
- Joana Pratas (born 1978), Portuguese former sailor
- José Pratas (1957–2017), Portuguese football referee
- José Maria Pratas (born 1982), Portuguese football coach and former player
