= 2012 Copa Euskal Herria (women's football) =

The 2012 Copa de Fútbol Femenino de Euskal Herria was the second edition of this competition organized by the Basque Country Football Federation, featuring eleven clubs from Euskadi and Navarra playing in Primera and Segunda plus a Northern Basque Country selection. It ran from May 2 to August 26, 2012.

Real Sociedad defeated defending champion Athletic Bilbao in the final, played in Beasain, to win the competition for the first time. Añorga KKE and SD Lagunak also reached the semifinals.

== Results ==
=== First round ===
The matches were played on 2 May, 4 and 16 June 2012.

Team 1	Score	Team 2
Northern Basque Country XI	0–15	Oiartzun
Añorga	7–1	Eibar
Aurrerá	4–3	Mondragón
San Juan	0–2	San Ignacio

=== Quarter-finals ===
The matches were played on 15, 19 and 21 August 2012.

Team 1	Score	Team 2
Oiartzun	1–3	Real Sociedad
Abanto	Walkover	Añorga
Aurrerá	0–10	Athletic Bilbao
Lagunak	2–1	San Ignacio

=== Semifinals ===
The matches were played on 22 and 23 August 2012.

Team 1	Score	Team 2
Real Sociedad	2–1	Añorga
Athletic Bilbao	5–0	Lagunak

=== Final ===
August 26, 2012
18:00 (CEST)

Real Sociedad	2 – 0	Athletic Bilbao
Beristain 15'; Agoues 82'

Loinaz, Beasain
