= Diego Meijide =

Uruguayan footballer (born 1976)

Personal information
- Full name: Diego Martín Meijide Blanco
- Date of birth: 9 May 1976 (age 50)
- Place of birth: Montevideo, Uruguay
- Height: 1.87 m (6 ft 2 in)
- Position: Defender

Senior career*
Years	Team	Apps	(Gls)
1995–1997	Miramar Misiones		
1997–1999	Deportivo Maldonado	-	(5)
1999–2001	Bella Vista		
2002	Villa Española		
2002	Tianjin Teda	6	(0)
2003–2004	Pinatar CF		
2004–2005	Mazarrón CF		
2005–2006	Panserraikos FC	22	(2)
2006–2007	CD Torrevieja		
2007–2008	Real Oviedo	28	(5)
2008–2009	Novelda CF		
2009–2010	Torrellano Illice		
2010–2011	CD Torrevieja	10	(7)
2012	Elche Ilicitano	1	(1)
2012	CD Eldense		
- * Club domestic league appearances and goals

Diego Martín Meijide Blanco (born May 9, 1976, in Montevideo) is an Uruguayan Association football player. He also holds Spanish citizenship. His main position is central defender.

== Clubs career ==
In the 2007–08 season he played for Real Oviedo, the champions of the region of Asturias (winners of the Trofeo Principado in 2007).

Signed from CD Torrevieja in 2006, with whom he played for five seasons, he was player of the season at that club in all five of those seasons. He rejoined the club in July 2010.

In March 2012, he left CD Torrevieja for Elche Ilicitano.

In July 2012, he signed for CD Eldense. He left the club in December 2012.

== Honours and awards ==
- Promotion to Primera División Uruguaya: 1998 Deportivo Maldonado (Promotion/relegation playoff winner)
