= Pinatar CF =

Pinatar
- Full name: Pinatar Club de Fútbol
- Founded: 1968
- Dissolved: 2013
- Ground: José Antonio Pérez, San Pedro del Pinatar, Murcia, Spain
- Capacity: 3,200
- Chairman: (Spain) José Luis Sorlí
- Manager: (Spain) Severo García
- 2012–13: 3ª – Group 13, 18th of 18
Home colours	Away colours

Pinatar Club de Fútbol was a Spanish football team based in San Pedro del Pinatar, in the autonomous community of Region of Murcia. Founded in 1965, it last played in Tercera División - Group 13, and held home games at Estadio José Antonio Pérez, which has a capacity of 3,200 seats.

In 2013, the club was dissolved due to its financial trouble.

== Season to season ==
Season	Tier	Division	Place	Copa del Rey
1968–69	5	2ª Reg.	4th	
1969–70	5	2ª Reg.	5th	
1970–71	5	2ª Reg.	3rd	
1971–72	5	1ª Reg.	3rd	
1972–73	5	1ª Reg.	7th	
1973–74	5	1ª Reg.	3rd	
1974–75	4	Reg. Pref.	18th	
1975–76	5	1ª Reg.	6th	
1976–77	4	Reg. Pref.	15th	
1977–78	5	Reg. Pref.	10th	
1978–79	5	Reg. Pref.	12th	
1979–80	5	Reg. Pref.	7th	
1980–81	4	3ª	10th	
1981–82	4	3ª	10th	
1982–83	4	3ª	20th	
1983–84	5	Reg. Pref.	15th	
1984–85	5	Reg. Pref.	18th	
1985–86	6	1ª Reg.	17th	
1986–87	DNP			
1987–88	7	2ª Reg.	12th	

Season	Tier	Division	Place	Copa del Rey
1988–89	6	1ª Reg.	9th	
1989–90	6	1ª Reg.	2nd	
1990–91	5	Reg. Pref.	4th	
1991–92	4	3ª	12th	
1992–93	4	3ª	9th	
1993–94	4	3ª	6th	
1994–95	4	3ª	7th	
1995–96	4	3ª	7th	
1996–97	4	3ª	12th	
1997–98	4	3ª	18th	
1998–99	5	Terr. Pref.	5th	
1999–2000	5	Terr. Pref.	4th	
2000–01	4	3ª	21st	
2001–02	5	Terr. Pref.	2nd	
2002–03	4	3ª	15th	
2003–04	4	3ª	10th	
2004–05	4	3ª	8th	
2005–06	4	3ª	3rd	
2006–07	4	3ª	7th	
2007–08	4	3ª	5th	

Season	Tier	Division	Place	Copa del Rey
2008–09	4	3ª	5th	
2009–10	4	3ª	6th	
2010–11	4	3ª	10th	
2011–12	4	3ª	13th	
2012–13	4	3ª	18th	

- 22 seasons in Tercera División

== Famous players ==
- (Argentina) Martin Prest
- (Equatorial Guinea) (Spain) Alberto Edjogo
- (Equatorial Guinea) (Spain) Sena
- (Uruguay) Diego Meijide
