= David Casablanca =

Spanish footballer

Personal information
- Full name: David Casablanca Poyatos
- Date of birth: 17 February 1977 (age 49)
- Place of birth: El Masnou, Spain
- Height: 1.70 m (5 ft 7 in)
- Position: Left back

Youth career
- Barcelona

Senior career*
Years	Team	Apps	(Gls)
1996	Barcelona C	1	(0)
1997–1999	Barcelona B	33	(0)
1998	→ Levante (loan)	6	(0)
1999–2000	Extremadura	11	(0)
2000	Cartagonova	7	(0)
2000–2001	Freamunde	27	(0)
2001–2002	Chaves	23	(0)
2002–2004	Pontevedra	74	(1)
2005–2008	Castellón	59	(0)
2008–2009	Negreira		
2009–2010	Don Benito		
2010–2012	Miajadas		
- * Club domestic league appearances and goals

David Casablanca Poyatos (born 17 February 1977) is a Spanish retired footballer who played as a left back.

== Football career ==
Born in El Masnou, Barcelona, Catalonia, Casablanca finished his youth career at FC Barcelona but could never break into the first team, also serving a loan at Levante UD during his spell with the former. After a two-year stint in Portugal with S.C. Freamunde and G.D. Chaves, both in the Segunda Liga, he returned to his country, signing with Segunda División B club Pontevedra CF and achieving promotion to Segunda División in his second full season. The team fired him after a night traffic accident.

In January 2005, Casablanca joined CD Castellón also in the third level, initially on loan. He achieved another promotion immediately as an undisputed starter, and continue to appear regularly the following campaign.

After falling out of favour (only seven league matches in two years combined), Casablanca left in summer 2008 and continued his career in amateur football, first with SD Negreira then CD Don Benito. He retired in 2012, at the age of 35.
