= Alexandre (footballer, born 1977) =

Brazilian footballer

Personal information
- Full name: Alexandre José de Oliveira Albuquerque
- Date of birth: 26 May 1977 (age 49)
- Place of birth: Recife, Brazil
- Height: 1.70 m (5 ft 7 in)
- Position: Midfielder

Youth career
- Sport

Senior career*
Years	Team	Apps	(Gls)
1994–1995	Rosario Central		
1995–1998	Villarreal	70	(5)
1998–2000	Eendracht Aalst		
2000–2002	Dinamo Zagreb	12	(1)
2002–2003	Ciudad Murcia	20	(3)
2004–2007	Lorca Deportiva	112	(12)
2008	Mazarrón	13	(0)
2008–2009	Alzira	26	(1)
- * Club domestic league appearances and goals

Alexandre José de Oliveira Albuquerque (born 26 May 1977 in Recife), known simply as Alexandre, is a Brazilian retired footballer who played as a midfielder. He also possessed Spanish nationality, due to the many years spent in the country.
