= SD Ciudad de Santiago =

Spanish football club

Ciudad Santiago
- Full name: Sociedad Deportiva Ciudad de Santiago, S.A.D.
- Founded: 1978
- Dissolved: 2009
- Ground: San Lázaro, Compostela, Galicia, Spain
- Capacity: 13,000
- 2009–10: 3ª – Group 1, withdrew
Home colours	Away colours

Sociedad Deportiva Ciudad de Santiago, S.A.D. was a Spanish football team based in Santiago de Compostela, in the autonomous community of Galicia. Founded in 1978 as Club Atlético Fátima, it played its last season in Tercera División - Group 1, holding home games at Estadio Multiusos de San Lázaro, with a capacity of 13,000 seats. Finally, the team disappeared in 2009, being re-founded as "Club Atlético Fátima" again.

== History ==
The team began its existence as Club Atlético Fátima, a team from the O Castiñeiriño neighborhood, being founded on June 14, 1978, and was federated within a few days. Its first president was Manuel Paz Nogueira, and the new club would have lower categories within its initial purpose, the soccer education of the youth of the city.

The team began its journey in the lower categories of Galician sport and remained in those divisions for much of its existence. However, the team underwent a great evolution from the year 2005, when the club promoted to Regional Preferente de Galicia and started a project to try to become the first club in Santiago de Compostela, receiving most of the money awarded by the Santiago City Council to sports clubs to the detriment of SD Compostela, and with the support of local sponsoring companies. The club converted to Sociedad Anónima Deportiva in a vote and was renamed Ciudad de Santiago from the 2005–06 season.

In the 2006–07 season the club ascended to Tercera División. The team moved to the Estadio Multiusos de San Lázaro and signed for the occasion several players from other Galician teams and others with experience in the First Division such as Changui. After finishing first in the regular phase, it promoted to Segunda División B after winning UD Almansa.

In the 2008–09 season, the team finished in 13th position in Segunda División B, but in August was relegated to the fourth level, for failing to pay its players their due salaries. On 29 December, it didn't take the pitch against Coruxo FC due to economic problems, thus being disqualified from the competition, and folding soon after.

=== Club names ===
- Club Atlético Fátima – (1978–2005)
- Sociedad Deportiva Ciudad de Santiago – (2005–09)

== Season to season ==
Season	Tier	Division	Place	Copa del Rey
1985–86	6	1ª Reg.	14th	
1986–87	6	1ª Reg.	15th	
1987–88	6	1ª Reg.	8th	
1988–89	6	1ª Reg.	18th	
1989–90	7	2ª Reg.	8th	
1990–91	7	2ª Reg.	5th	
1991–92	7	2ª Reg.	1st	
1992–93	6	1ª Reg.	14th	
1993–94	6	1ª Reg.	2nd	
1994–95	5	Reg. Pref.	12th	
1995–96	5	Reg. Pref.	12th	
1996–97	5	Reg. Pref.	18th	
1997–98	6	1ª Reg.	9th	

Season	Tier	Division	Place	Copa del Rey
1998–99	6	1ª Reg.	10th	
1999–2000	6	1ª Reg.	5th	
2000–01	6	1ª Reg.	2nd	
2001–02	5	Reg. Pref.	14th	
2002–03	5	Reg. Pref.	8th	
2003–04	5	Reg. Pref.	11th	
2004–05	5	Reg. Pref.	12th	
2005–06	5	Reg. Pref.	2nd	
2006–07	5	Pref. Aut.	2nd	
2007–08	4	3ª	1st	
2008–09	3	2ª B	13th	First round
2009–10	4	3ª	(R)	

- 1 season in Segunda División B
- 2 seasons in Tercera División

== Famous players ==
- (Equatorial Guinea) Justice
