= Alberto Edjogo-Owono =

Equatoguinean footballer (born 1984)

Alberto Edjogo Owono
Personal information
- Full name: Alberto Edjogo Owono Montalbán
- Date of birth: 21 April 1984 (age 42)
- Place of birth: Sabadell, Spain
- Height: 1.80 m (5 ft 11 in)
- Position: Forward

Youth career
- Mercantil
- Espanyol
- 2001–2003: Sabadell
- 2002–2003: → Granollers (loan)

Senior career*
Years	Team	Apps	(Gls)
2002–2004	Sabadell	12	(1)
2004	→ Gramenet B (loan)	10	(1)
2005	Peralada	7	(2)
2006	Badalona B	24	(11)
2006–2007	Sant Andreu	9	(1)
2007–2008	Pinatar		
2008–2009	Olímpic Xàtiva		
2009–2010	Mazarrón		
2010–2011	Blanes	19	(5)
2011–2014	Vista Alegre	76	(30)
2014	Vilafranca	13	(3)
2014–2015	Horta	29	(6)
Total		199	(60)

International career
2006–2007	Equatorial Guinea U23		
2003–2012	Equatorial Guinea	5	(?)
- * Club domestic league appearances and goals

Alberto Edjogo Owono Montalbán (born 21 April 1984) is a former footballer who played as a forward and a current sports broadcaster. Born in Spain, he played for the Equatorial Guinea national team.

== Club career ==
Born in Sabadell, Barcelona, Catalonia, to an Equatoguinean father and a Spanish mother from Granada, Edjogo Owono emerged through local CE Sabadell FC's youth system, making his senior debut in 2003 with the club in Segunda División B. Released two years later, he resumed his career in amateur football mainly in his native region, only returning to the third level in the 2006–07 season and appearing rarely for UE Sant Andreu (one fourth of the matches played, team relegation).

Subsequently, Edjogo Owono returned to the regional championships, representing successively Pinatar CF, CD Olímpic de Xàtiva, Mazarrón CF, CD Blanes, UD Vista Alegre, FC Vilafranca and UA Horta.

== International career ==
Edjogo Owono made his Equatorial Guinea national team debut on 6 July 2003, in a 2004 Africa Cup of Nations qualifying match against Morocco in Bata, a 0–1 home defeat.

== Personal life ==
Edjogo Owono's older brother, Juvenal, is also a former footballer. A midfielder, he also represented Sabadell.
