= Justice Esono =

Equatoguinean footballer

Justice
Personal information
- Full name: Pablo Armando Esono Edjo
- Date of birth: 10 June 1986 (age 40)
- Place of birth: Malabo, Equatorial Guinea
- Height: 1.80 m (5 ft 11 in)
- Positions: Right winger; attacking midfielder

Senior career*
Years	Team	Apps	(Gls)
2005–2006	The Panters	–	(–)
2006	Malmö FF		
2006–2007	Ciudad de Santiago	2	(1)
2007–2008	Peñarroya-Pueblonuevo	–	(–)
2008–2009	The Panters	–	(–)
2009	GCE Villaralbo (trial)		

International career^{‡}
2006–2009	Equatorial Guinea	10	(0)
- * Club domestic league appearances and goals as of 30 April 2009 ‡ National team caps and goals as of 6 June 2009

Pablo Armando Esono Edjo (born 10 June 1986), better known as Justice, is an Equatoguinean retired footballer who played as a striker. He was a member of the Equatorial Guinea national team.

== International career ==
=== International goals ===
#	Date	Venue	Opponent	Score	Result	Competition
1	29 March 2006	Estadio La Libertad, Bata, Equatorial Guinea	Benin	2 – 0	2 – 0	Friendly match

== Honours ==
=== International ===
- Equatorial Guinea
  - CEMAC Cup
    - Winner (1): 2006
