= CN Sestao =

Sestao Swimming Club
- Full name: Club Natación Sestao; Sestaoko Igeriketa Kluba
- Short name: CNS; CN Sestao
- Sport: Swimming; Water polo (2011-2019)
- Founded: 1986; 40 years ago
- Association: Basque Swimming Federation (FVN-EIF); Royal Spanish Swimming Federation (RFEN)
- Based in: Sestao (Basque Country); Spain
- Arena: La Benedicta, Sestao
- Colors: Green, black
- Head coach: Iván Martín Seoane (2008-2011)

The Sestao Swimming Club (Basque: Sestaoko Igeriketa Kluba; Spanish: Club Natación Sestao), abbreviated as CNS or CN Sestao, is a Spanish aquatic sports club from Sestao (Basque Country), established in 1986.

== History ==
The club was founded in 1986. Since then it has been the official swimming team of the municipality of Sestao. For this reason, its sports colors are green and black, which are the same colors as the Sestao flag. The club has its official headquarters at the La Benedicta sports centre. The club is a federated member of the Basque Swimming Federation (FVN-EIF) and also a federated member of the Royal Spanish Swimming Federation (RFEN).

In 2011, CN Sestao merged with the Sestao Water Polo Club, founded in 2006, to form a larger aquatic sports club. However, both clubs decided to separate in 2019, becoming independent clubs again.

Since 2006, the CN Sestao has organized the La Benedicta Crossing, a swimming crossing that takes place in the Estuary of Nervion of Sestao (open water swimming), which begins from the La Benedicta basin and runs along the estuary to the Vizcaya Bridge, and for which renowned swimmers such as David Meca or the triathlete Virginia Berasategui are usually invited.

In 2019, the CN Sestao went to the 2019 Spanish Swimming Championship (Barcelona, 2019) thanks to the swimmer Oihane Arias. In 2023, the CN Sestao qualified for the 2023 Spanish Swimming Championship (Sabadell, 2023) and achieved the title in the 100 meter butterfly thanks to the swimmer Nahia Bárcena. In 2024, the green-and-black club managed to qualify and obtain the minimum mark to participate in the 2024 Spanish Swimming Championship (Sabadell, 2024).

== Head coaches ==
- Iván Martín Seoane (2008–2011)
- Uxue Paredes Huete (2022–2023)
- Ana Alonso Aldama (2023–2024)

== See also ==
- Basque Swimming Federation
- CN Sabadell
- CN Terrassa
- Sestao River Club
