= Prats =

Prats may refer to:

== Places ==
- Prats, Andorra, a village in Andorra
- Prats, a village in the municipality of Prats i Sansor, Catalonia
- Prats de Lluçanès, a town in Catalonia
- Prats-de-Mollo-la-Preste, a village in Pyrénées Orientales, France
- Els Prats de Rei, a village in Catalonia
- Prats-de-Sournia, a village in Pyrénées Orientales, France
- Saint-Seurin-de-Prats, a village in Aquitane, France

== Other uses ==
- Prats (surname)
- The Prats, a Scottish punk rock group
