= Copa Euskal Herria (women's football) =

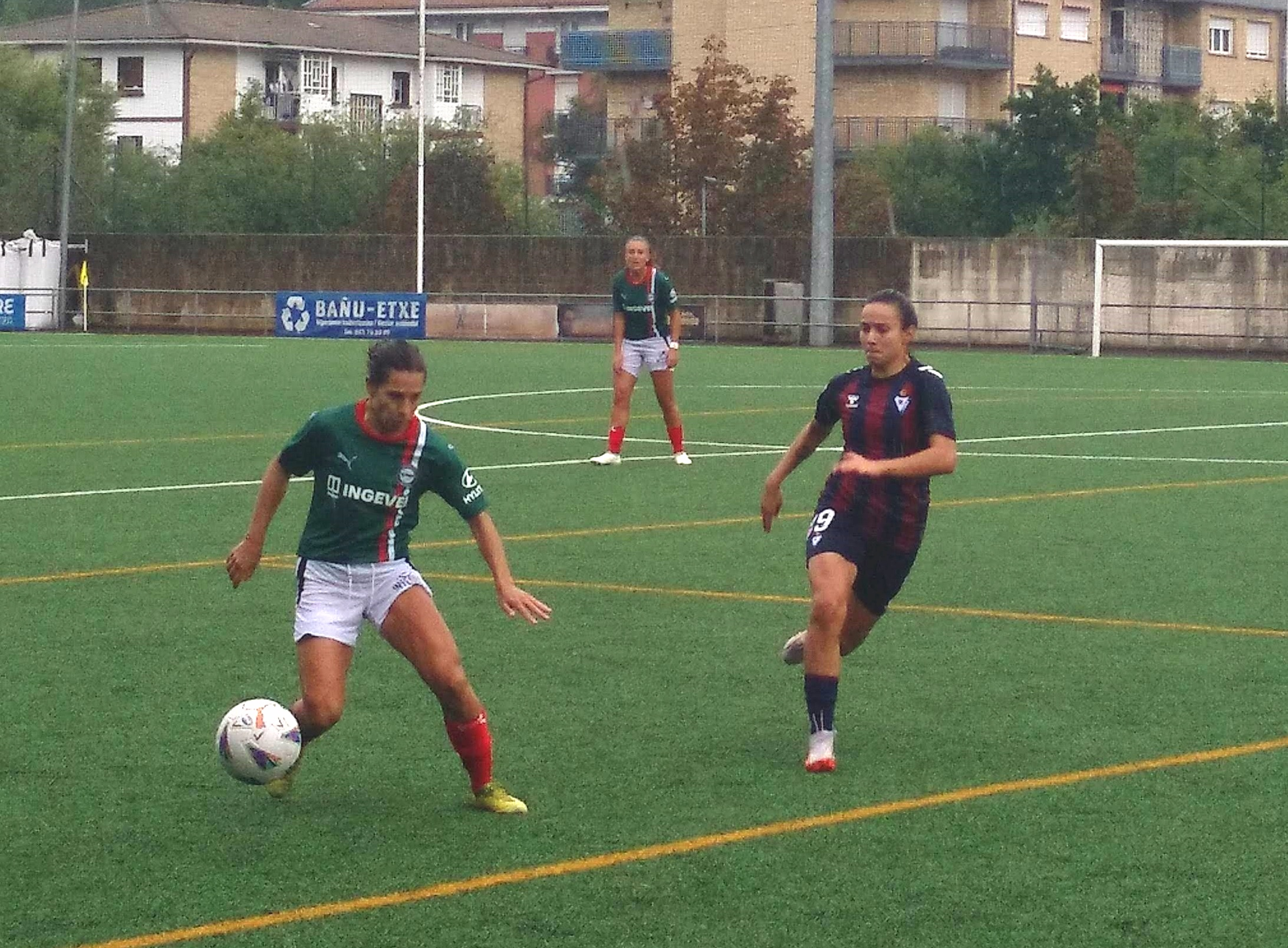
Action from the 2023 3rd-place match between Alavés (green) and Eibar (dark blue)

The Basque Country Cup (Basque: Euskal Herria Kopa) is a knockout competition for women's football clubs in the Basque Country, which includes teams from both the Spanish Basque Country and Iparralde (French Basque Country).

Since its establishment in 2011, Athletic Bilbao have won nine titles and Real Sociedad four. Those two rival clubs appeared in all the finals until 2021, when Alavés qualified for its first final.

From 2020, the lower division competition the 'Copa Vasca' (Basque Cup, won several times by Athletic Bilbao's B-team and once by Real Sociedad's first team) was incorporated as 'Group B' of the Basque Country Cup.

== Finals ==
Year	City	Winner	Result	Runner-up
2011 (I)	Bakio	Athletic Bilbao	4–1	Real Sociedad
2012 (II)	Beasain	Real Sociedad	2–0	Athletic Bilbao
2013 (III)	Azpeitia	Athletic Bilbao	1–0	Real Sociedad
2014 (IV)	Bilbao	Athletic Bilbao	3–1	Real Sociedad
2015 (V)	Zarautz	Athletic Bilbao	1–0	Real Sociedad
2016 (VI)	Gernika	Athletic Bilbao	3–0	Real Sociedad
2017 (VII)	Elgoibar	Athletic Bilbao	3–0	Real Sociedad
2018 (VIII)	Amorebieta	Athletic Bilbao	5–1	Real Sociedad
2019 (IX)	Azpeitia	Real Sociedad	3–0	Athletic Bilbao
2020 (X)	Amorebieta	Real Sociedad	0–0 (Note: Real Sociedad won 8–7 in a penalty shootout.)	Athletic Bilbao
2021 (XI)	Zarautz	Athletic Bilbao	2–1	Alavés
2022 (XII)	Azkoitia	Real Sociedad	4–1	Alavés
2023 (XIII)	Lezama	Athletic Bilbao	4–2	Real Sociedad

== See also ==
- Copa Catalunya, Catalan counterpart.
- Euskal Herriko Futbol Txapelketa, similar men's version
