= Joseba Ituarte =

Spanish footballer and coach

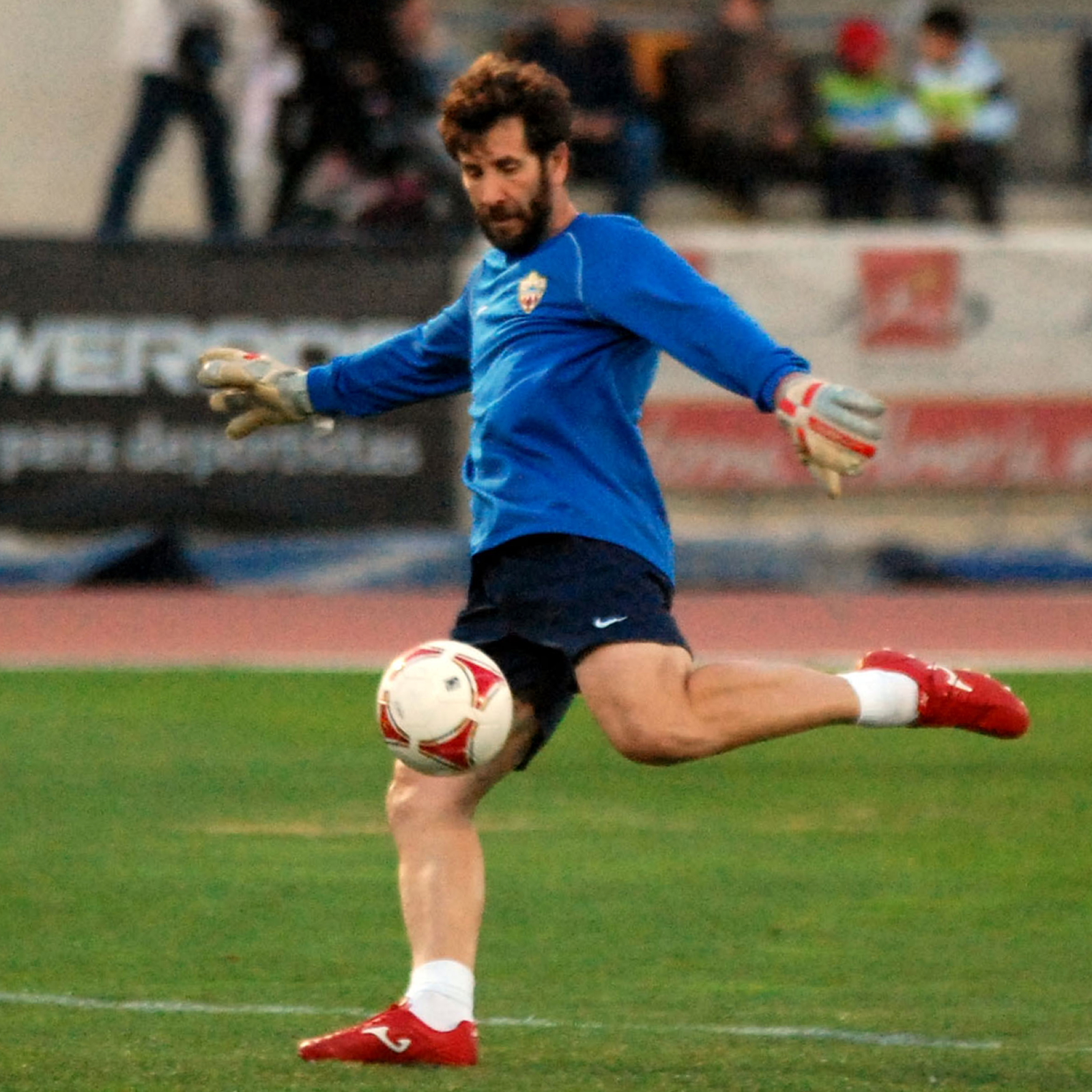
- Ituarte working with Almería B

Personal information
- Full name: José Francisco Ituarte Goenaga
- Date of birth: 26 September 1970 (age 56)
- Place of birth: Lasarte-Oria, Spain
- Height: 1.83 m (6 ft 0 in)
- Position: Goalkeeper

Youth career
- 1986–1989: Real Sociedad

Senior career*
Years	Team	Apps	(Gls)
1989–1991	Real Sociedad B		
1991–1993	Touring	81	(0)
1993–1994	Hércules	2	(0)
1995	Pontevedra	18	(0)
1995–1998	Almería	8	(0)
1995–1998	Poli Almería	22	(0)
1998–1999	Águilas	12	(0)
1999–2000	Granada	3	(0)
2000–2001	Imortal	1	(0)
2001–2002	Huesca		
2002–2003	Portosantense		
2003–2004	Motril	33	(0)
2004–2005	Roquetas	6	(0)
- * Club domestic league appearances and goals

José Francisco 'Joseba' Ituarte Goenaga (born 26 September 1970) is a Spanish retired footballer who played as a goalkeeper.

== Football career ==
Born in Lasarte-Oria, Gipuzkoa, Ituarte played youth football with Real Sociedad. In a 16-year senior career his professional input consisted of ten second division games with Hércules CF and UD Almería combined, and one with Imortal D.C. in the Portuguese second level.

Ituarte started working as a goalkeeper coach with his last club, CD Roquetas. In 2005, he joined Almería in the same capacity and also in Andalusia, going on to spend several seasons with the reserves; in October 2013 he moved abroad, signing for Muangthong United F.C. in the Thai Premier League.
