= Esteban Navarro (footballer) =

Spanish footballer and manager

Personal information
- Full name: Esteban José Navarro Navarro
- Date of birth: 22 March 1976 (age 50)
- Place of birth: Almería, Spain
- Height: 1.73 m (5 ft 8 in)
- Position: Midfielder

Youth career
- Los Molinos
- Marbella
- San Pedro
- Roquetas

Senior career*
Years	Team	Apps	(Gls)
1995–1999	Roquetas		
1999–2006	Almería	153	(3)
2006–2007	Córdoba	47	(1)
2007–2010	Roquetas	108	(5)
Total		270	(5)

Managerial career
- 2010–2012: Roquetas (assistant)
- 2012–2013: Roquetas
- 2013–2018: Almería (youth)
- 2018–2019: Almería B
- * Club domestic league appearances and goals

Esteban José Navarro Navarro (born 22 March 1976) is a retired Spanish footballer who played as a central midfielder, and is a current manager.

Most of his 17-year professional career was spent at Almería, where he amassed Segunda División totals of 82 games and two goals (adding 71/1 in Segunda División B).

== Playing career ==
Esteban was born in Almería, Andalusia. After beginning to play as a senior for CD Roquetas, he moved to his hometown's UD Almería, where he became a regular starter as the team climbed up from the fourth to the second division.

Esteban played his first match as a professional on 31 August 2002, starting in a 1–2 home loss against UD Salamanca. He only scored his first goal in the second level on 27 September 2003, netting a last-minute equalizer in a 2–2 home draw to Recreativo de Huelva.

On 12 January 2006, after struggling with injuries during the season, Esteban moved to Córdoba CF from division three. After being an ever-present figure during his spell, he moved back to first club Roquetas and retired in 2010, aged 34.

== Managerial career ==
Shortly after retiring, Esteban became assistant manager at his last club. He was appointed head coach on 17 May 2012, leaving in the following summer.

In July 2013, Esteban returned to Almería, where he worked with the youth teams. On 25 April 2018, after Fran Fernández's promotion to the first team, he was appointed manager of the reserves in the fourth tier.

On 16 October 2019, Esteban was sacked by the Rojiblancos, being replaced by Nandinho.
