= Iván Martín Seoane =

Spanish swimmer and manager (born 1987)

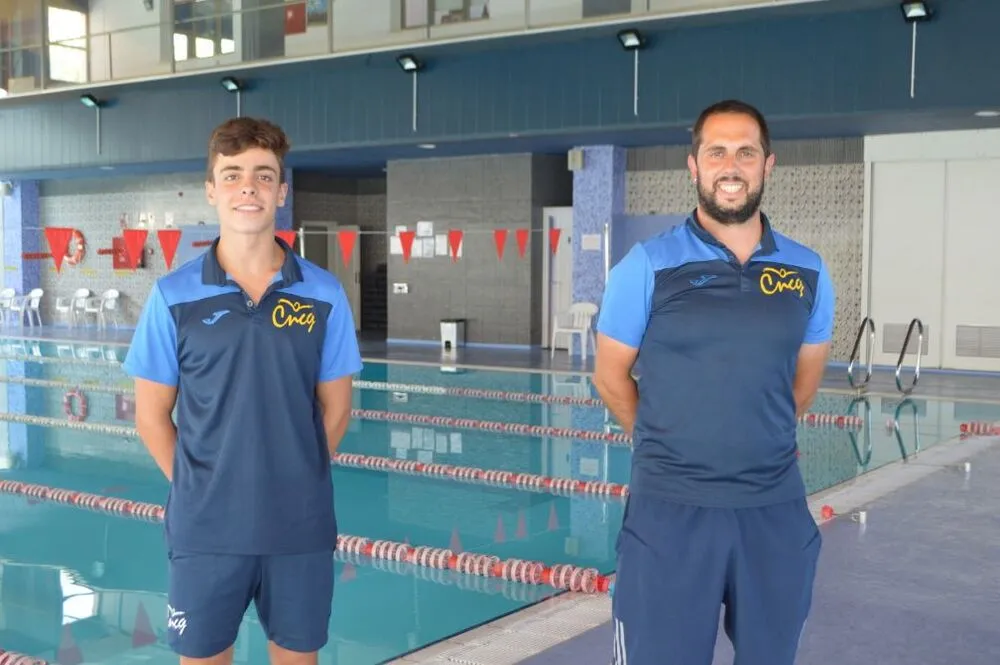
- Fernando Olivares Manjavacas and Iván Martín Seoane. Spanish Swimming Championship. 2021.

Personal information
- Full name: Iván Martín Seoane
- National team: Spain
- Born: 1987 (age 38–39) Barakaldo (Basque Country); Spain

Sport
- Sport: Swimming
- Strokes: Freestyle, Butterfly, Medley
- Club: CN Santurtzi; Deportiva Náutica Portugalete

Iván Martín Seoane
Coaching career (HC unless noted)
- 2008-2011: CN Sestao; Head coach
- 2009-2011: Biscayan Swimming Federation; Head coach
- 2011-2013: Club Deportivo La Unión; Head coach
- 2013-2015: CN Abulense; Head coach
- 2019-2021: CN Criptana Gigantes; Head coach
- 2020: Official Selection of Castilla-La Mancha; Official coach (Spanish Swimming Championship)
- 2021-2022: CN Vila-real; Head coach

Iván Martín Seoane (born 1987) is a Spanish former competition swimmer and swimming coach.

He is currently the official coach of the CN Vila-real team of Valencia (Spain). As a competition swimmer he achieved and holds different sports titles such as champion of the Basque Country, champion of Biscay or runner-up of the Basque Country.

== Biography ==
Iván Martín Seoane was born in 1987 in Barakaldo (Basque Country). He studied the licenciate degree in physical activity and sports sciences at the University of the Basque Country, with a specialization in swimming.

As a swimmer, he was a professional competition swimmer between 1995 and 2005, achieving different achievements and titles from the children's to the junior categories. As a coach, he began his coaching career at the Sestao Swimming Club (CNS) of Sestao (Basque Country), where he was its technical director and coach for three sports seasons, between 2008 and 2011.

In the 2019-2020 and 2020-2021 sports seasons, Martín was the technical director and coach of CN Criptana Gigantes (Campo de Criptana). Under his direction, he took the swimmer Fernando Olivares to the Spanish Swimming Championship, who reached the national minimum in 200 medleys.

In 2020, Martín was selected as the official coach of the Castilla-La Mancha Official Selection for the VI Spanish Swimming Championship.

Since the 2021–2022 season he has been the technical director and coach of CN Villarreal of Valencia, succeeding Carlampio Fresquet.

== Managerial career ==
- CN Sestao (2008–2011) Technical director and head coach.
- Biscayan Swimming Federation (2009–2011) Technical director.
- Club Deportivo La Unión (2011–2013) Technical director and head coach
- CN Abulense (2013–2015) Technical director and head coach
- CN Criptana Gigantes (2019–2021) Technical director and head coach
- Spanish Swimming Championship. Official Selection of Castilla-La Mancha. 2020. Official coach.
- CN Vila-real (2021–2022) Technical director and head coach

== Clubs as a swimmer ==
- CN Santurtzi (2002–2004)
- Deportiva Náutica Portugalete (2004–2006)

== Awards as a swimmer ==
Martín was a competition swimmer between 1995 and 2005, achieving his greatest successes and sport titles from the children's to the junior categories, which are the following:

- Champion of Biscay (50 butterfly, 100 butterfly and 100 freestyle; and in the 4×50 styles, 4×100 styles, 4×50 freestyle and 4×100 freestyle relays).
- Second place of Biscay (50 butterfly, 100 butterfly, 50 freestyle and 100 freestyle; and in all relays)
- Champion of Basque Country (50 butterfly and 4×100 freestyle)
- Second place of Basque Country (50 butterfly, in the 4×100 freestyle and 4×50 freestyle)
