= José Maria Pratas =

Portuguese football coach

Personal information
- Full name: José Maria Dionísio Pratas
- Date of birth: 24 March 1982 (age 44)
- Place of birth: Portel, Portugal
- Position: Centre-back

Team information
- Current team: Santos (assistant)

Youth career
- 1994–1996: Sporting Viana do Alentejo
- 1996–2001: Lusitano Évora

Senior career*
Years	Team	Apps	(Gls)
2001–2003	Lusitano Évora		
2003–2009	Oriolenses		
2009–2012	Vasco da Gama Vidigueira		

Managerial career
- 2011–2012: Lusitano Évora (youth)
- 2012–2016: Vasco da Gama Vidigueira
- 2016–2017: Debrecen (assistant)
- 2018–2019: Jumilla (assistant)
- 2019–2020: Estoril (assistant)
- 2021–2022: Belenenses SAD U23
- 2022: B-SAD
- 2024: Shanghai Shenhua (youth)
- 2025–: Santos (assistant)
- * Club domestic league appearances and goals

José Maria Dionísio Pratas (born 24 March 1982) is a Portuguese football coach and former player who played as a centre-back. He is the current assistant manager of Brazilian club Santos FC.

== Playing career ==
Born in Oriola, Portel, Pratas made his senior debut with Lusitano GC, in 2001. He subsequently represented GDC Os Oriolenses and CF Vasco da Gama Vidigueira, retiring with the latter in 2012, aged 30.

== Coaching career ==
Pratas worked at Sporting CP between 2005 and 2007, helping to establish a new scouting department. In 2011, he returned to his former club Lusitano, now as manager of the under-19 team.

Immediately after retiring, Pratas became the manager of Vasco da Gama Vidigueira in 2012, remaining in charge until 2016. In August 2016, he joined the staff of compatriot Leonel Pontes at Hungarian club Debreceni VSC, as his assistant.

In 2018, after a period studying at FC Barcelona and VfB Stuttgart, Pratas rejoined Pontes' staff at FC Jumilla, again as an assistant. In July 2019, he was named Tiago Fernandes' assistant at G.D. Estoril Praia.

In 2021, Pratas joined Belenenses SAD to work as manager of the under-23 squad. On 19 July 2022, he was confirmed as first team manager, with the club now being called B-SAD.

Pratas was sacked from B-SAD on 24 August 2022, after three winless matches. He later worked as a technical coordinator of the Beja Football Association, before moving to China in August 2023 to join Shanghai Shenhua FC, reuniting with Pontes. At Shenhua, he was a director of youth football, and later took over their under-21 side in October 2024.

In January 2025, Pratas joined the staff of compatriot Pedro Caixinha at Campeonato Brasileiro Série A side Santos FC.

== Managerial statistics ==
As of 7 January 2025

Managerial record by team and tenure
Team	Nat	From	To	Record							
Team	Nat	From	To	G	W	D	L	GF	GA	GD	Win %
B-SAD	(Portugal)	19 July 2022	24 August 2022	3	0	1	2	7	9	−2	0.00
Total				3	0	1	2	7	9	−2	0.00
