= 1992 Tercera División play-offs =

Spanish football league play-offs

The 1992 Tercera División play-offs to Segunda División B from Tercera División (Promotion play-offs) were the final playoffs for the promotion from 1991–92 Tercera División to 1992–93 Segunda División B. The first four teams of each group (excluding reserve teams) took part in the play-off.

== Group A-1 ==
Pos	Team	Pld	W	D	L	GF	GA	GD	Pts
1	Aranjuez	6	3	2	1	8	5	+3	8
2	Bergantiños	6	3	2	1	13	5	+8	8
3	Langreo	6	1	3	2	6	7	−1	5
4	Bembibre	6	1	1	4	3	13	−10	3

- Promotion to Segunda 'B': Aranjuez

== Group A-2 ==
Pos	Team	Pld	W	D	L	GF	GA	GD	Pts
1	Racing Ferrol	6	5	0	1	22	4	+18	10
2	Caudal	6	2	2	2	10	12	−2	6
3	Ctral. León	6	2	1	3	5	15	−10	5
4	Móstoles	6	1	1	4	6	12	−6	3

- Promotion to Segunda 'B': Racing Ferrol

== Group A-3 ==
Pos	Team	Pld	W	D	L	GF	GA	GD	Pts
1	Celta Turista	6	4	0	2	10	4	+6	8
2	Zamora	6	3	2	1	7	3	+4	8
3	R. Madrid C	6	2	1	3	6	9	−3	5
4	Hispano	6	1	1	4	4	11	−7	3

- Promotion to Segunda 'B': Celta Turista

== Group A-4 ==
Pos	Team	Pld	W	D	L	GF	GA	GD	Pts
1	Alcalá	6	5	0	1	12	7	+5	10
2	Lealtad	6	3	0	3	8	6	+2	6
3	Carballino	6	3	0	3	8	10	−2	6
4	Astorga	6	1	0	5	6	11	−5	2

- Promotion to Segunda 'B': RSD Alcalá

== Group B-1 ==
Pos	Team	Pld	W	D	L	GF	GA	GD	Pts
1	Elgóibar	6	3	2	1	9	4	+5	8
2	Barbastro	6	3	1	2	10	8	+2	7
3	Comillas	6	2	2	2	6	9	−3	6
4	Calahorra	6	1	1	4	6	10	−4	3

- Promotion to Segunda 'B': Elgóibar

== Group B-2 ==
Pos	Team	Pld	W	D	L	GF	GA	GD	Pts
1	Beasaín	6	4	1	1	12	6	+6	9
2	Utebo	6	2	3	1	6	4	+2	7
3	Escobedo	6	2	1	3	6	7	−1	5
4	Peña Sport	6	1	1	4	8	15	−7	3

- Promotion to Segunda 'B': Beasaín

== Group B-3 ==
Pos	Team	Pld	W	D	L	GF	GA	GD	Pts
1	Endesa Andorra	6	3	2	1	9	4	+5	8
2	Amorebieta	6	3	0	3	10	9	+1	6
3	Artajonés	6	1	4	1	7	8	−1	6
4	Marina Cudeyo	6	1	2	3	6	11	−5	4

- Promotion to Segunda 'B': Endesa Andorra

== Group B-4 ==
Pos	Team	Pld	W	D	L	GF	GA	GD	Pts
1	Izarra	6	3	1	2	13	6	+7	7
2	Real Unión	6	3	1	2	7	7	0	7
3	Laredo	6	2	2	2	5	6	−1	6
4	Hernán Cortés	6	1	2	3	6	12	−6	4

- Promotion to Segunda 'B': Izarra

== Group C-1 ==
Pos	Team	Pld	W	D	L	GF	GA	GD	Pts
1	Valencia B	6	6	0	0	19	5	+14	12
2	Premiá	6	3	1	2	6	8	−2	7
3	At. Baleares	6	1	2	3	4	9	−5	4
4	Águilas	6	0	1	5	4	11	−7	1

- Promotion to Segunda 'B' Valencia B

== Group C-2 ==
Pos	Team	Pld	W	D	L	GF	GA	GD	Pts
1	Lliria	6	2	3	1	8	5	+3	7
2	Manacor	6	2	3	1	7	7	0	7
3	Gramanet	6	2	2	2	6	7	−1	6
4	Imperial	6	0	4	2	5	7	−2	4

- Promotion to Segunda 'B': Lliria

== Group C-3 ==
Pos	Team	Pld	W	D	L	GF	GA	GD	Pts
1	Horadada	6	4	0	2	17	12	+5	8
2	Balaguer	6	3	2	1	11	9	+2	8
3	Mallorca At.	6	2	0	4	10	12	−2	4
4	Beniel	6	1	2	3	6	11	−5	4

- Promotion to Segunda 'B' Horadada

== Group C-4 ==
Pos	Team	Pld	W	D	L	GF	GA	GD	Pts
1	Ibiza	6	3	2	1	17	8	+9	8
2	Eldense	6	4	0	2	12	5	+7	8
3	Júpiter	6	1	3	2	6	10	−4	5
4	Santomera	6	1	1	4	3	15	−12	3

- Promotion to Segunda 'B' Ibiza

== Group D-1 ==
Pos	Team	Pld	W	D	L	GF	GA	GD	Pts
1	San Roque	6	3	2	1	10	6	+4	8
2	At. Malagueño	6	2	2	2	11	12	−1	6
3	Conquense	6	2	1	3	9	12	−3	5
4	Plasencia	6	2	1	3	8	8	0	5

- Promotion to Segunda 'B': San Roque

== Group D-2 ==
Pos	Team	Pld	W	D	L	GF	GA	GD	Pts
1	Écija	6	3	3	0	7	2	+5	9
2	Talavera	6	2	2	2	6	7	−1	6
3	Vélez	6	1	3	2	3	5	−2	5
4	Don Benito	6	2	0	4	6	8	−2	4

- Promotion to Segunda 'B' Écija

== Group D-3 ==
Pos	Team	Pld	W	D	L	GF	GA	GD	Pts
1	Toledo	6	2	4	0	6	2	+4	8
2	Algeciras	6	1	4	1	7	4	+3	6
3	Moralo	6	1	3	2	4	10	−6	5
4	Mármol Macael	6	0	5	1	6	7	−1	5

- Promotion to Segunda 'B' Toledo

== Group D-4 ==
Pos	Team	Pld	W	D	L	GF	GA	GD	Pts
1	Sevilla B	6	3	2	1	10	4	+6	8
2	Cacereño	6	3	1	2	10	6	+4	7
3	Iliturgi	6	2	2	2	3	5	−2	6
4	Alcázar	6	0	3	3	3	11	−8	3

- Promotion to Segunda 'B': Sevilla B
  - CD Málaga was dissolved and Cacereño was promoted to Segunda B

== Group E ==
Pos	Team	Pld	W	D	L	GF	GA	GD	Pts
1	Mensajero	6	3	2	1	9	4	+5	8
2	Orotava	6	2	2	2	6	12	−6	6
3	Gáldar	6	1	3	2	4	7	−3	5
4	Las Palmas B	6	2	1	3	11	7	+4	5

- Promotion to Segunda 'B' : Mensajero

== See also ==
- 1991–92 Tercera División
