= SD Negreira =

Spanish football club

Negreira
- Full name: Sociedad Deportiva Negreira
- Nickname: Nicrarienses
- Founded: 1964; 62 years ago
- Stadium: Campo Municipal de Fútbol Jesús García Calvo
- Capacity: 2,000
- President: José Antonio Fraga
- Head coach: Fran Raviña
- League: Preferente Futgal – Group 1
- 2025–26: Preferente Futgal – Group 1, 3rd of 18
- Website: sdnegreira.es
Home colours	Away colours

Sociedad Deportiva Negreira is a Spanish football team based in Negreira, in the autonomous community of Galicia.Founded in 1964, it plays in Preferente Futgal – Group 1, holding home matches at Campo Municipal de Fútbol Jesús García Calvo, with a capacity of 2,000 seats.

== Season to season ==
Season	Tier	Division	Place	Copa del Rey
1964–65	5	1ª Reg.	4th	
1965–66	5	1ª Reg.	7th	
1966–67	5	1ª Reg.	2nd	
1967–68	4	Serie A	13th	
1968–69	4	Serie A	14th	
1969–70	4	Serie A	15th	
1970–71	5	1ª Reg.	9th	
1971–72	5	1ª Reg.	1st	
1972–73	5	1ª Reg.	3rd	
1973–74	5	1ª Reg.	2nd	
1974–75	5	1ª Reg.	2nd	
1975–76	5	1ª Reg.	9th	
1976–77	5	1ª Reg.	9th	
1977–78	6	1ª Reg.	4th	
1978–79	7	2ª Reg.	5th	
1979–80	7	2ª Reg.	4th	
1980–81	7	2ª Reg.	14th	
1981–82	7	2ª Reg.	8th	
1982–83	6	1ª Reg.	15th	
1983–84	6	1ª Reg.	12th	

Season	Tier	Division	Place	Copa del Rey
1984–85	6	1ª Reg.	17th	
1985–86	6	1ª Reg.	12th	
1986–87	6	1ª Reg.	1st	
1987–88	5	Reg. Pref.	5th	
1988–89	5	Reg. Pref.	7th	
1989–90	5	Reg. Pref.	5th	
1990–91	5	Reg. Pref.	8th	
1991–92	5	Reg. Pref.	3rd	
1992–93	5	Reg. Pref.	6th	
1993–94	5	Reg. Pref.	12th	
1994–95	5	Reg. Pref.	13th	
1995–96	5	Reg. Pref.	17th	
1996–97	6	1ª Reg.	1st	
1997–98	5	Reg. Pref.	13th	
1998–99	5	Reg. Pref.	6th	
1999–2000	5	Reg. Pref.	8th	
2000–01	5	Reg. Pref.	1st	
2001–02	4	3ª	15th	
2002–03	4	3ª	13th	
2003–04	4	3ª	11th	

Season	Tier	Division	Place	Copa del Rey
2004–05	4	3ª	2nd	
2005–06	3	2ª B	20th	
2006–07	4	3ª	3rd	
2007–08	4	3ª	16th	
2008–09	4	3ª	9th	
2009–10	4	3ª	8th	
2010–11	4	3ª	8th	
2011–12	4	3ª	14th	
2012–13	4	3ª	15th	
2013–14	4	3ª	20th	
2014–15	5	Pref. Aut.	1st	
2015–16	4	3ª	12th	
2016–17	4	3ª	12th	
2017–18	4	3ª	19th	
2018–19	5	Pref.	16th	
2019–20	6	1ª Gal.	10th	
2020–21	DNP			
2021–22	7	1ª Gal.	1st	
2022–23	7	1ª Gal.	2nd	
2023–24	7	1ª Gal.	1st	

Season	Tier	Division	Place	Copa del Rey
2024–25	6	Pref. Futgal	2nd	
2025–26	6	Pref. Futgal		First round

- 1 seasons in Segunda División B
- 13 seasons in Tercera División

== Famous players ==
- (Argentina) Pibe
- (Spain) David Casablanca
