= Ivelisse Prats Ramírez =

Dominican Republic politician (1931–2020)

Ivelisse Prats Ramírez (23 July 1931 – 11 October 2020) was a Dominican politician who served as president of the Partido Revolucionario Dominicano (PRD) from 1979 to 1982 and was later vice president in 2004.

== Life and career ==
Prats Ramírez was the first woman in the Dominican Republic and in all of Latin America to be elected president of a political party. Before becoming a member, Ivelisse Prats Ramirez was doing social militancy with the PRD. Her experience working social militancy has led her to believe it is important for politicians to have experienced something similar in order for them to gain social sensitivity.

In 1970, she was a representative for professors under the Asociación Dominicana de Profesores (ADP). Four years later, she was appointed as a leader of the Comité Ejecutivo Nacional (CEN) in 1974, by José Francisco Peña Gómez, after he recognized her political merits and accomplishments. She also became the director of the National Department of Education. In September 1978, Ivelisse Prats Ramirez was named directorate for the First School of Pictures of the PRD, which was being sponsored by the Friedrich Ebert Foundation. During the same year she was elected deputy for the National District and the year following, she was elected president of the Partido Revolucionario Dominicano. Ivelisse Prats resigned from her position as President of the PRD in 1982, after she was appointed Minister of Education.

For a year, in 1988, she was the director of the Department of Cultural and Teacher Affairs of the PRD, a position that was created by the white party. Once again in 1989, she went back to being the director for the National Department of Education. Ivelisse Prats Ramirez was regent for the PRD in the National District during elections in 1994. As of 1996, she was elected and has remained the National Secretary of Education and Doctrine, which was created through the merging of the Department of Education and Doctrine. Prats continues to keep herself busy with her political tasks while also putting together seminars, teaching classes and writing. Some of her works are used as textbooks in courses offered by the PRD.

Prats Ramírez died in Santo Domingo, Dominican Republic on 11 October 2020, at the age of 89.
