= Mazarrón CF =

Spanish football club

Mazarrón
- Full name: Mazarrón Club de Fútbol
- Founded: 1969
- Dissolved: 2010
- Ground: Estadio Municipal, Mazarrón, Murcia, Spain
- Capacity: 3,500
- 2009–10: 3ª - Group 13, 18th
Home colours	Away colours

Mazarrón Club de Fútbol was a Spanish football team based in Mazarrón, in the autonomous community of Region of Murcia. Founded in 1969, it was dissolved on 2010. After the club's dissolution, a new club named Mazarrón FC was founded as a replacement.

In 1996, the club merged with CD Bala Azul, becoming Playas de Mazarrón CF. However, in the following year, the fusion was undone mainly due to the high rivalry between both sides.

== Season to season ==
Season	Tier	Division	Place	Copa del Rey
1969–70	5	2ª Reg.	10th	
1970–71	5	2ª Reg.	4th	
1971–72	5	1ª Reg.	12th	
1972–73	5	1ª Reg.	13th	
1973–74	5	1ª Reg.	6th	
1974–75	4	Reg. Pref.	20th	
1975–76	5	1ª Reg.	12th	
1976–77	5	1ª Reg.	2nd	
1977–78	5	Reg. Pref.	13th	
1978–79	5	Reg. Pref.	14th	
1979–80	5	Reg. Pref.	19th	
1980–81	5	Reg. Pref.	11th	
1981–82	5	Reg. Pref.	1st	
1982–83	4	3ª	19th	
1983–84	5	Reg. Pref.	5th	
1984–85	5	Reg. Pref.	11th	
1985–86	5	Reg. Pref.	13th	
1986–87	5	Reg. Pref.	13th	
1987–88	5	Reg. Pref.	10th	
1988–89	5	Reg. Pref.	10th	
1989–90	5	Reg. Pref.	9th	

Season	Tier	Division	Place	Copa del Rey
1990–91	5	Reg. Pref.	15th	
1991–92	5	Reg. Pref.	9th	
1992–93	5	Reg. Pref.	9th	
1993–94	5	Reg. Pref.	20th	
1994–95	DNP			
1995–96	6	1ª Reg.	1st	
1996–97	DNP			
1997–98	DNP			
1998–99	5	Terr. Pref.	7th	
1999–2000	5	Terr. Pref.	1st	
2000–01	4	3ª	12th	
2001–02	4	3ª	17th	
2002–03	4	3ª	12th	
2003–04	4	3ª	2nd	
2004–05	4	3ª	4th	
2005–06	4	3ª	11th	
2006–07	4	3ª	2nd	
2007–08	3	2ª B	17th	First round
2008–09	4	3ª	6th	
2009–10	4	3ª	18th	

- 1 season in Segunda División B
- 10 seasons in Tercera División

== Famous players ==
- (Brazil) Alexandre
- (Equatorial Guinea) (Spain) Alberto Edjogo
- (Rwanda) (France) Edwin Ouon
- (Spain) Quini
- (Spain) Diego Ribera
- (Spain) Nacho Rodríguez
- (Uruguay) Diego Meijide
