= CD Ciempozuelos =

Spanish football team

Ciempozuelos
- Full name: Club Deportivo Ciempozuelos
- Founded: 1968
- Dissolved: 2013
- Ground: Peñuelas, Ciempozuelos, Madrid, Spain
- Capacity: 1,000
- Chairman: (Spain) Alberto Durán
- 2012–13: Primera de Aficionados – Group 3, 10th of 18
Home colours	Away colours

Club Deportivo Ciempozuelos was a Spanish football team based in Ciempozuelos, in the autonomous community of Madrid. Founded in 1968 and dissolved in 2013, it last played in Primera de Aficionados – Group 3, holding home matches at Polideportivo Peñuelas, with a capacity of 1,000 seats.

== Season to season ==
Season	Tier	Division	Place	Copa del Rey
1969–70	7	3ª Reg.	2nd	
1970–71	7	3ª Reg.	1st	
1971–72	5	2ª Reg.	4th	
1972–73	5	2ª Reg.	7th	
1973–74	5	1ª Reg.	13th	
1974–75	5	1ª Reg.	10th	
1975–76	5	1ª Reg.	2nd	
1976–77	4	Reg. Pref.	4th	
1977–78	4	3ª	6th	Third round
1978–79	4	3ª	15th	First round
1979–80	4	3ª	9th	First round
1980–81	4	3ª	11th	First round
1981–82	4	3ª	11th	
1982–83	4	3ª	14th	
1983–84	4	3ª	5th	
1984–85	4	3ª	18th	First round
1985–86	5	Reg. Pref.	12th	
1986–87	5	Reg. Pref.	14th	
1987–88	5	Reg. Pref.	1st	
1988–89	4	3ª	19th	

Season	Tier	Division	Place	Copa del Rey
1989–90	5	Reg. Pref.	2nd	
1990–91	5	Reg. Pref.	4th	
1991–92	5	Reg. Pref.	3rd	
1992–93	5	Reg. Pref.	7th	
1993–94	5	Reg. Pref.	6th	
1994–95	5	Reg. Pref.	11th	
1995–96	5	Reg. Pref.	12th	
1996–97	5	Reg. Pref.	10th	
1997–98	5	Reg. Pref.	4th	
1998–99	5	Reg. Pref.	10th	
1999–2000	5	Reg. Pref.	14th	
2000–01	5	Reg. Pref.	7th	
2001–02	5	Reg. Pref.	11th	
2002–03	5	Reg. Pref.	1st	
2003–04	4	3ª	8th	
2004–05	4	3ª	4th	
2005–06	4	3ª	7th	
2006–07	4	3ª	4th	
2007–08	4	3ª	1st	
2008–09	4	3ª	7th	First round

Season	Tier	Division	Place	Copa del Rey
2009–10	4	3ª	19th	
2010–11	5	Pref.	12th	
2011–12	5	Pref.	15th	
2012–13	6	1ª Afic.	7th	

- 16 seasons in Tercera División

== Famous players ==
- (Spain) Abel Resino
- (Spain) Juan Señor
