= Zalla UC =

Spanish football club

Coordinates: 43.2118°N 3.1292°W

Zalla
- Full name: Zalla Unión Club
- Founded: 1925
- Ground: Landaberri, Zalla, Basque Country, Spain
- Capacity: 3,500
- President: (Spain) Tomás Miguel
- Head coach: (Spain) Fernando Pérez
- League: División de Honor
- 2024–25: División de Honor, 3rd of 18
Home colours	Away colours

Zalla Unión Club is a Spanish football team based in Zalla, in the autonomous community of Basque Country. Founded in 1925 it plays in División de Honor, holding home games at Estadio Landaberri, with a capacity of 3,500 seats.

Team colours are: blue and white shirt, black shorts and blue and white-hooped socks at home, entirely red away.

== Season to season ==
Season	Tier	Division	Place	Copa del Rey
1928–29	6	2ª Reg.	2nd	
1929–30	6	2ª Reg.	2nd	
1930–31	6	2ª Reg.	1st	
1931–32	6	2ª Reg.	2nd	
1932–33	6	2ª Reg.	4th	
1933–1947	DNP			
1947–48	5	2ª Reg.	4th	
1948–49	5	2ª Reg.	5th	
1949–50	5	2ª Reg.	2nd	
1950–51	5	2ª Reg.	3rd	
1951–52	5	2ª Reg.	8th	
1952–53	5	2ª Reg.	3rd	
1953–54	5	2ª Reg.	1st	
1954–55	4	1ª Reg.	12th	
1955–56	4	1ª Reg.	11th	
1956–57	4	1ª Reg.	13th	
1957–58	5	2ª Reg.	9th	
1958–59	5	2ª Reg.	9th	
1959–60	5	2ª Reg.	1st	
1960–61	4	1ª Reg.	11th	

Season	Tier	Division	Place	Copa del Rey
1961–62	4	1ª Reg.	15th	
1962–63	5	2ª Reg.	2nd	
1963–64	5	2ª Reg.	1st	
1964–65	4	1ª Reg.	5th	
1965–66	4	1ª Reg.	11th	
1966–67	4	1ª Reg.	4th	
1967–68	4	1ª Reg.	7th	
1968–69	4	Reg. Pref.	13th	
1969–70	4	Reg. Pref.	12th	
1970–71	5	1ª Reg.	2nd	
1971–72	4	Reg. Pref.	9th	
1972–73	4	Reg. Pref.	20th	
1973–74	5	1ª Reg.	2nd	
1974–75	4	Reg. Pref.	5th	
1975–76	4	Reg. Pref.	4th	
1976–77	4	Reg. Pref.	13th	
1977–78	5	Reg. Pref.	5th	
1978–79	5	Reg. Pref.	11th	
1979–80	5	Reg. Pref.	6th	
1980–81	5	Reg. Pref.	8th	

Season	Tier	Division	Place	Copa del Rey
1981–82	5	Reg. Pref.	12th	
1982–83	5	Reg. Pref.	11th	
1983–84	5	Reg. Pref.	1st	
1984–85	4	3ª	6th	
1985–86	4	3ª	9th	First round
1986–87	4	3ª	11th	
1987–88	4	3ª	15th	
1988–89	4	3ª	4th	
1989–90	4	3ª	9th	
1990–91	4	3ª	9th	
1991–92	4	3ª	5th	
1992–93	4	3ª	17th	First round
1993–94	4	3ª	7th	
1994–95	4	3ª	4th	
1995–96	4	3ª	1st	
1996–97	3	2ª B	19th	Second round
1997–98	4	3ª	2nd	
1998–99	4	3ª	4th	
1999–2000	4	3ª	7th	
2000–01	4	3ª	10th	

Season	Tier	Division	Place	Copa del Rey
2001–02	4	3ª	3rd	
2002–03	4	3ª	3rd	
2003–04	4	3ª	7th	Preliminary
2004–05	4	3ª	2nd	
2005–06	3	2ª B	20th	
2006–07	4	3ª	1st	
2007–08	4	3ª	7th	First round
2008–09	4	3ª	13th	
2009–10	4	3ª	13th	
2010–11	4	3ª	12th	
2011–12	4	3ª	5th	
2012–13	4	3ª	6th	
2013–14	4	3ª	6th	
2014–15	4	3ª	6th	
2015–16	4	3ª	8th	
2016–17	4	3ª	18th	
2017–18	5	Div. Hon.	18th	
2018–19	6	Pref.	16th	
2019–20	7	1ª Div.	1st	
2020–21	DNP			

Season	Tier	Division	Place	Copa del Rey
2021–22	7	Pref.	2nd	
2022–23	6	Div. Hon.	9th	
2023–24	6	Div. Hon.	3rd	
2024–25	6	Div. Hon.	3rd	
2025–26	6	Div. Hon.		

- 2 seasons in Segunda División B
- 30 seasons in Tercera División
