= UD Almansa =

Association football club in Spain

Almansa
- Full name: Unión Deportiva Almansa
- Founded: 1992
- Ground: Polideportivo Municipal Paco Simón, Almansa, Castile-La Mancha, Spain
- Capacity: 5,000
- President: Ignacio Herreros
- Head coach: Sergio Inclán
- League: Tercera Federación – Group 18
- 2025–26: Primera Autonómica Preferente – Group 1, 1st of 18 (champions)
Home colours	Away colours

Unión Deportiva Almansa is a Spanish football team based in Almansa, in the autonomous community of Castile-La Mancha. Founded in 1992 it plays in Tercera Federación – Group 18, holding home games at Polideportivo Municipal Paco Simón, with a capacity of 5,000 seats.

== History ==
The first seasons in the Tercera división were not easy, except in the 1998–99 season when the club struggled to save the category.

=== Club names ===
- Escuela de Fútbol Castillo de Almansa (1992–96)
- Unión Deportiva Almansa (1996–)

==== Other clubs from Almansa ====
- Club Deportivo Almansa — (1940–47)
- Asociación Polideportiva Almansa — (1948–91)
- Unión Deportiva Almansa — (1992–)

== Season to season ==
Season	Tier	Division	Place	Copa del Rey
1993–94	7	2ª Reg.	1st	
1994–95	6	1ª Reg.	1st	
1995–96	5	1ª Aut.	6th	
1996–97	5	1ª Aut.	3rd	
1997–98	4	3ª	9th	
1998–99	4	3ª	14th	
1999–2000	4	3ª	7th	
2000–01	4	3ª	7th	
2001–02	4	3ª	8th	
2002–03	4	3ª	8th	
2003–04	4	3ª	6th	
2004–05	4	3ª	1st	
2005–06	3	2ª B	17th	Third round
2006–07	4	3ª	4th	
2007–08	4	3ª	3rd	
2008–09	4	3ª	2nd	
2009–10	4	3ª	11th	
2010–11	4	3ª	4th	
2011–12	4	3ª	2nd	
2012–13	4	3ª	12th	

Season	Tier	Division	Place	Copa del Rey
2013–14	4	3ª	4th	
2014–15	4	3ª	2nd	
2015–16	4	3ª	5th	
2016–17	4	3ª	6th	
2017–18	4	3ª	19th	
2018–19	5	Aut. Pref.	2nd	
2019–20	4	3ª	20th	
2020–21	4	3ª	8th / 3rd	
2021–22	5	3ª RFEF	13th	
2022–23	6	Aut. Pref.	4th	
2023–24	6	Aut. Pref.	4th	
2024–25	6	Aut. Pref.	5th	
2025–26	6	Aut. Pref.	1st	
2026–27	5	3ª Fed.		

- 1 season in Segunda División B
- 22 seasons in Tercera División
- 2 seasons in Tercera Federación/Tercera División RFEF
