= CD Roquetas =

Spanish football club

Roquetas
- Full name: Club Deportivo Roquetas
- Founded: 1970
- Dissolved: 2016
- Ground: Antonio Peroles, Roquetas, Andalusia, Spain
- Capacity: 9,000
- Chairman: (Spain) Pedro López Galdeano
- Manager: (Spain) José Juan Sánchez "Jota"
- 2013–14: Primera Andaluza – Group 4, 14th of 18
Home colours	Away colours

Club Deportivo Roquetas, also known as Roquetas, was a Spanish football team based in Roquetas de Mar, in the autonomous community of Andalusia. Founded in 1970, it was dissolved in 2016. The club's home ground is Estadio Antonio Peroles, with a capacity of 9,000 seats.

Roquetas ceased to play at a senior level in 2014, and merged with AD Marinas Urbanización and UD Ciudad de Roquetas to create a senior side with the latter's name.

== Season to season ==
Season	Tier	Division	Place	Copa del Rey
1970–71	5	2ª Reg.	1st	
1971–72	4	1ª Reg.	19th	
1972–73	5	2ª Reg.	2nd	
1973–74	5	2ª Reg.	10th	
1974–75	5	2ª Reg.	3rd	
1975–76	5	1ª Reg.	14th	
1976–77	5	1ª Reg.	13th	
1977–78	6	1ª Reg.	4th	
1978–79	6	1ª Reg.	2nd	
1979–80	6	1ª Reg.	8th	
1980–81	5	Reg. Pref.	9th	
1981–82	5	Reg. Pref.	5th	
1982–83	5	Reg. Pref.	8th	
1983–84	5	Reg. Pref.	1st	
1984–85	4	3ª	12th	
1985–86	4	3ª	6th	
1986–87	4	3ª	11th	Third round
1987–88	4	3ª	19th	
1988–89	5	Reg. Pref.	1st	
1989–90	5	Reg. Pref.	3rd	

Season	Tier	Division	Place	Copa del Rey
1990–91	5	Reg. Pref.	4th	
1991–92	5	Reg. Pref.	1st	
1992–93	4	3ª	6th	
1993–94	4	3ª	14th	Second round
1994–95	4	3ª	10th	
1995–96	4	3ª	9th	
1996–97	4	3ª	14th	
1997–98	4	3ª	15th	
1998–99	4	3ª	15th	
1999–2000	4	3ª	9th	
2000–01	4	3ª	8th	
2001–02	4	3ª	11th	
2002–03	4	3ª	11th	
2003–04	4	3ª	11th	
2004–05	4	3ª	3rd	
2005–06	4	3ª	6th	
2006–07	4	3ª	2nd	
2007–08	4	3ª	1st	
2008–09	3	2ª B	12th	Second round
2009–10	3	2ª B	16th	

Season	Tier	Division	Place	Copa del Rey
2010–11	3	2ª B	7th	
2011–12	3	2ª B	17th	Second round
2012–13	5	1ª And.	13th	
2013–14	5	1ª And.	14th	

- 4 seasons in Segunda División B
- 20 seasons in Tercera División

== Notable players ==
- (Philippines) (Spain) Juan Luis Guirado
- (Spain) Esteban
