= 2000–01 Segunda División B =

Segunda División B
- Season: 2000–01
- Promoted: Burgos; Gimnàstic de Tarragona; Polideportivo Ejido; Xerez
- Relegated: Siero; San Sebastián de los Reyes; Ávila; Deportivo La Coruña B Racing de Santander B Peña Sport; Tropezón; Chantrea; Burriana; Alzira; Gandía; Premià; Guadix; Linares; Don Benito; Polideportivo Almería; Fuenlabrada
- Top goalscorer: Quico Rey; Egoitz Sukia (22 goals)
- Best goalkeeper: Armando Ribeiro (0.39 goals)
- Biggest home win: Beasain 8–0 Tropezón (10 February 2001)
- Biggest away win: Deportivo La Coruña B 0–6 Ponferradina (18 March 2001)
- Highest scoring: L'Hospitalet 8–1 Benidorm (17 September 2000); Algeciras 6–3 Coria (29 October 2000)

The 2000–01 Segunda División B season was the 24th edition of the tournament. It started in August 2000 and ended in May 2001.

== Summary before the 2000–01 season ==
Playoffs de Ascenso:

- Universidad de Las Palmas (P)
- Ourense
- Racing de Ferrol (P)
- Mensajero
- Gimnástica de Torrelavega
- Zaragoza B
- Burgos
- Barakaldo
- Gandía
- Murcia (P)
- Gramenet
- Hércules
- Granada
- Ceuta
- Xerez
- Jaén (P)

Relegated from Segunda División:

- Atlético Madrid B
- Toledo
- Mérida (dissolved)
- Logroñés (relegated to Tercera División)

Promoted from Tercera División:

- Deportivo La Coruña B (from Group 1)
- Siero (from Group 2)
- AD Universidad de Oviedo (from Group 2)
- Tropezón (from Group 3)
- Racing de Santander B (from Group 3)
- Eibar B (from Group 4)
- Espanyol B (from Group 5)
- Mataró (from Group 5)
- Burriana (from Group 6)
- Benidorm (from Group 6)
- Alcorcón (from Group 7)
- Ejido (from Group 9)
- Linares (from Group 9)
- Almería (from Group 9)
- Algeciras (from Group 10)
- Vecindario (from Group 12)
- Peña Sport (from Group 15)

Relegated:

- Lanzarote
- Oviedo B
- Gimnástica Segoviana
- Móstoles
- Bermeo
- Valladolid B
- Figueruelas
- Izarra
- Valencia B
- Yeclano
- Ontinyent
- Lorca
- Betis B
- Cacereño
- Sevilla B
- Águilas
- Avilés
- Fuenlabrada

Dissolved:

- Manchego

Occupied the vacant spots by administrative relegations:

- Chantrea (occupied the vacant spot of Logroñés)

Occupied the vacant spots by clubs dissolutions:

- San Fernando (occupied the vacant spot of Manchego)
- Don Benito (occupied the vacant spot of Mérida)

== Group I ==
Teams from Asturias, Canary Islands, Castile and León, Castilla–La Mancha, Community of Madrid and Galicia.

=== Teams ===
Location of teams in Segunda División B Gr. 1 2000–01
Canary Islands

Team	Founded	Home city	Stadium
Alcorcón	1971	Alcorcón, Madrid	Santo Domingo
Atlético de Madrid B	1960	Majadahonda, Madrid	Cerro del Espino
Real Ávila	1923	Ávila, Castile and León	Adolfo Suárez
Caudal	1918	Mieres, Asturias	Hermanos Antuña
Deportivo La Coruña B	1994	Abegondo, Galicia	Anexo de Riazor
Fuenlabrada	1975	Fuenlabrada, Madrid	La Aldehuela
Lugo	1953	Lugo, Galicia	Anxo Carro
Mensajero	1924	Santa Cruz de La Palma, Canary Islands	Silvestre Carrillo
Ourense	1952	Ourense, Galicia	O Couto
Pájara Playas de Jandía	1996	Pájara, Canary Islands	Benito Alonso
Ponferradina	1922	Ponferrada, Castile and León	El Toralín
Pontevedra	1941	Pontevedra, Galicia	Pasarón
Real Madrid B	1930	Madrid, Madrid	Ciudad Deportiva
San Sebastián de los Reyes	1971	San Sebastián de los Reyes, Madrid	Nuevo Matapiñonera
Siero	1916	Pola de Siero, Asturias	Luis Miranda
Sporting Gijón B	1960	Gijón, Asturias	Mareo
Toledo	1928	Toledo, Castilla–La Mancha	Salto del Caballo
Universidad de Oviedo	1961	Oviedo, Asturias	San Gregorio
Vecindario	1962	Vecindario, Canary Islands	Municipal de Vecindario
Zamora	1968	Zamora, Castile and León	La Vaguada

=== League table ===
Pos	Team	Pld	W	D	L	GF	GA	GD	Pts	Qualification or relegation
1	Atlético Madrid B	38	22	8	8	63	27	+36	74	Qualification for Play-Off
2	Ourense	38	21	10	7	60	31	+29	73	Qualification for Play-Off
3	Zamora	38	21	8	9	65	37	+28	71	Qualification for Play-Off
4	Toledo	38	19	9	10	59	34	+25	66	Qualification for Play-Off
5	Sporting de Gijón B	38	17	12	9	52	45	+7	63	
6	Pájara Playas	38	18	7	13	51	45	+6	61	
7	Real Madrid B	38	18	7	13	74	53	+21	61	
8	Vecindario	38	18	4	16	65	65	0	58	
9	Caudal	38	14	10	14	40	38	+2	52	
10	Mensajero	38	12	13	13	40	44	−4	49	
11	Ponferradina	38	12	11	15	45	50	−5	47	
12	Alcorcón	38	11	11	16	46	53	−7	44	
13	Universidad de Oviedo	38	11	11	16	46	60	−14	44	
14	Pontevedra	38	11	11	16	41	65	−24	44	
15	Lugo	38	11	10	17	36	47	−11	43	
16	Fuenlabrada	38	11	9	18	40	47	−7	42	Qualification for Play-out
17	Siero	38	10	12	16	42	55	−13	42	Relegation to 2001–02 Tercera División
18	San Sebast. Reyes	38	10	8	20	42	59	−17	38	Relegation to 2001–02 Tercera División
19	Ávila	38	9	11	18	46	66	−20	38	Relegation to 2001–02 Tercera División
20	Deportivo de La Coruña B	38	8	10	20	36	68	−32	34	Relegation to 2001–02 Tercera División

Source: BDFutbol
Rules for classification: 1) points; 2) head-to-head points; 3) head-to-head goal difference; 4) head-to-head goals scored; 5) goal difference; 6) number of goals scored.

=== Results ===
Home \ Away	ALC	ATL	AVI	CAU	DEP	FUE	LUG	MEN	OUR	PAJ	PNF	PNT	RMB	SSR	SIE	SPG	TOL	UOV	VEC	ZAM
Alcorcón	—	1–3	1–2	2–2	1–0	1–0	1–0	4–0	1–0	1–0	1–1	4–1	1–3	1–2	1–1	0–2	1–1	2–2	1–1	1–1
Atlético B	2–0	—	3–1	2–1	1–1	0–2	1–2	0–0	1–0	2–0	0–1	3–0	3–1	3–0	1–0	0–1	0–0	2–0	6–2	3–1
Real Ávila	3–1	0–0	—	0–0	2–3	0–2	3–1	0–2	1–3	0–1	1–2	4–1	0–0	1–1	1–1	0–0	0–1	2–2	3–1	1–1
Caudal	3–0	0–1	2–0	—	3–0	1–0	2–1	1–0	2–0	1–1	2–0	0–1	3–2	2–1	1–0	0–0	1–1	0–2	1–0	0–1
Deportivo B	2–2	1–5	3–2	0–0	—	0–3	1–1	2–1	0–0	2–2	0–6	2–3	2–4	1–1	1–2	1–2	1–3	0–0	2–0	0–1
Fuenlabrada	0–0	0–3	1–2	1–1	2–0	—	0–0	1–0	1–2	1–1	1–0	4–0	0–1	1–1	2–1	2–1	1–1	1–2	2–3	0–1
Lugo	1–4	1–1	5–1	1–1	2–1	2–0	—	0–1	0–0	1–0	1–3	1–0	1–2	2–0	0–0	0–1	0–0	1–1	1–0	0–2
Mensajero	2–0	1–0	4–0	0–0	5–1	0–0	1–0	—	1–1	0–0	1–0	2–0	0–3	0–0	1–1	2–2	1–5	1–3	1–4	1–1
Ourense	3–0	2–1	1–2	1–0	1–1	5–1	1–0	3–3	—	1–0	1–1	2–2	2–0	4–1	2–1	0–0	2–0	3–0	3–1	1–0
Pájara Playas	2–1	1–0	2–1	2–0	2–0	0–4	2–1	1–1	0–1	—	3–0	0–1	1–0	1–0	4–1	2–1	2–1	3–0	1–0	2–1
Ponferradina	1–0	0–1	1–1	0–1	1–0	4–1	1–2	1–1	0–2	2–2	—	3–0	1–1	1–0	1–1	1–2	1–3	1–0	4–0	2–1
Pontevedra	0–2	1–1	0–1	2–0	1–0	1–0	2–2	1–0	3–1	2–2	2–2	—	1–0	3–1	1–1	1–3	0–0	3–2	2–3	0–2
Real Madrid B	3–1	1–3	3–3	3–2	2–1	4–0	4–0	0–1	0–0	0–3	4–0	0–0	—	6–1	3–1	4–0	2–3	1–1	4–1	0–4
San Sebast. Reyes	0–2	0–2	1–0	1–1	0–1	2–1	3–0	1–1	0–2	4–1	2–1	5–0	0–2	—	2–3	0–0	2–0	0–1	0–1	0–1
Siero	0–2	2–2	2–2	1–0	2–0	1–2	1–0	1–0	0–2	1–2	1–0	2–1	2–3	2–2	—	1–3	2–1	3–1	0–2	1–1
Sporting B	1–1	0–1	1–2	3–1	1–2	0–0	3–1	0–1	1–3	3–2	0–0	1–1	4–3	2–0	1–0	—	1–1	2–1	4–3	1–1
Toledo	1–0	2–2	5–0	1–0	0–1	1–0	2–0	2–1	2–1	2–0	6–0	1–1	2–1	1–2	1–0	0–1	—	4–1	2–0	1–0
Univ. Oviedo	3–2	0–1	4–2	0–3	1–1	0–0	0–2	2–0	0–2	1–0	0–0	1–1	2–4	3–0	1–1	2–2	1–0	—	1–2	0–3
Vecindario	1–1	0–3	1–0	3–0	2–0	3–2	0–2	2–0	1–1	4–2	3–0	4–1	3–0	4–3	2–2	1–2	3–1	2–5	—	2–1
Zamora	3–1	1–0	3–2	4–2	1–2	2–1	1–1	1–3	3–1	3–1	2–2	3–1	0–0	1–3	3–0	4–0	2–1	3–0	1–0	—

Source: BDFutbol
Legend: Blue = home team win; Yellow = draw; Red = away team win.

=== Top goalscorers ===
Goalscorers	Goals	Team
(Spain) Quico Rey	22	Ourense
(Spain) Aiert Derteano	20	Zamora
(Equatorial Guinea) Chupe	16	Alcorcón
(Switzerland) Toño Ruiz	15	Siero
(Spain) Raúl Molina	14	Atlético Madrid B

=== Top goalkeepers ===
Goalkeeper	Goals	Matches	Average	Team
(Spain) Luis García	24	35	0.69	Atlético Madrid B
(Spain) José Manuel Santisteban	31	38	0.82	Ourense
(Spain) Rubén Martínez	28	33	0.85	Zamora
(Spain) José Ramón de la Fuente	34	38	0.89	Toledo
(Spain) Carlos Mariño	34	34	1	Lugo

== Group II ==
Teams from Aragon, Basque Country, Cantabria, Castile and León, La Rioja and Navarre.

=== Teams ===
Location of teams in Segunda División B Gr. 2 2000–01

Team	Founded	Home city	Stadium
Alavés B	1960	Vitoria, Basque Country	José Luis Compañón
Amurrio	1949	Amurrio, Basque Country	Basarte
Athletic Bilbao B	1964	Bilbao, Basque Country	Lezama
Aurrerá Vitoria	1935	Vitoria, Basque Country	Olanrabe
Barakaldo	1917	Barakaldo, Basque Country	Ciudad Deportiva de San Vicente
Beasain	1905	Beasain, Basque Country	Loinaz
Binéfar	1922	Binéfar, Aragon	Los Olmos
Burgos	1985	Burgos, Castile and León	El Plantío
Calahorra	1946	Calahorra, La Rioja	La Planilla
Chantrea	1952	Pamplona, Navarre	Chantrea
Cultural Leonesa	1923	León, Castile and León	Puente Castro
Eibar B	1994	Eibar, Basque Country	Unbe
Gernika	1922	Gernika, Basque Country	Urbieta
Gimnástica Torrelavega	1907	Torrelavega, Cantabria	El Malecón
Osasuna B	1962	Aranguren, Navarre	Tajonar
Peña Sport	1925	Tafalla, Navarre	San Francisco
Racing de Santander B	1993	Santander, Cantabria	La Albericia
Real Unión	1915	Irún, Basque Country	Stadium Gal
Tropezón	1983	Tanos, Torrelavega, Cantabria	Santa Ana
Zaragoza B	1958	Zaragoza, Aragon	Ciudad Deportiva del Real Zaragoza

=== League Table ===
Pos	Team	Pld	W	D	L	GF	GA	GD	Pts	Qualification or relegation
1	Burgos	38	20	12	6	53	20	+33	72	Qualification for Play-Off
2	Cultural Leonesa	38	17	14	7	41	25	+16	65	Qualification for Play-Off
3	Calahorra	38	16	16	6	43	26	+17	64	Qualification for Play-Off
4	Amurrio	38	18	10	10	34	28	+6	64	Qualification for Play-Off
5	Zaragoza B	38	17	12	9	45	22	+23	63	
6	Athletic Bilbao B	38	16	14	8	44	30	+14	62	
7	Beasain	38	14	15	9	67	49	+18	57	
8	Osasuna B	38	13	14	11	32	28	+4	53	
9	Real Unión	38	13	13	12	41	41	0	52	
10	Alavés B	38	10	20	8	39	36	+3	50	
11	Aurrerá	38	12	14	12	35	36	−1	50	
12	Barakaldo	38	12	12	14	29	33	−4	48	
13	Gimnástica de Torrelavega	38	11	14	13	37	33	+4	47	
14	Eibar B	38	11	11	16	31	40	−9	44	
15	Gernika	38	8	18	12	27	37	−10	42	
16	Binéfar	38	10	12	16	28	47	−19	42	Qualification for Play-out
17	Racing de Santander B	38	8	14	16	30	38	−8	38	Relegation to 2001–02 Tercera División
18	Peña Sport	38	6	16	16	33	55	−22	34	Relegation to 2001–02 Tercera División
19	Tropezón	38	6	10	22	21	61	−40	28	Relegation to 2001–02 Tercera División
20	Chantrea	38	5	13	20	19	44	−25	28	Relegation to 2001–02 Tercera División

Source: BDFutbol
Rules for classification: 1) points; 2) head-to-head points; 3) head-to-head goal difference; 4) head-to-head goals scored; 5) goal difference; 6) number of goals scored.

=== Results ===
Home \ Away	ALV	AMU	ATH	AUR	BAR	BEA	BIN	BUR	CAL	CHA	CUL	EIB	GER	GIM	OSA	PEÑ	RAC	RUN	TRO	ZAR
Alavés B	—	1–0	1–1	0–0	1–0	1–2	1–2	0–0	1–1	3–0	1–0	1–2	1–3	4–3	0–0	3–3	1–1	1–1	2–2	0–0
Amurrio	2–0	—	1–1	2–1	0–1	0–3	2–0	1–1	0–1	1–0	2–1	2–1	1–0	1–0	0–0	0–0	2–0	1–0	2–0	0–1
Athletic B	0–3	1–1	—	1–1	0–0	4–2	1–0	0–1	0–0	2–0	3–0	1–0	1–0	1–1	2–0	3–2	1–0	1–2	0–1	1–0
Aurrerá Vitoria	1–1	0–0	1–0	—	2–1	1–1	2–0	0–1	1–1	0–2	1–0	0–0	2–0	0–0	2–0	2–0	0–1	0–0	2–0	1–0
Barakaldo	0–0	0–2	0–0	1–0	—	1–0	1–1	1–2	2–0	1–0	0–0	1–1	0–1	0–1	1–0	2–0	1–0	1–0	1–1	2–1
Beasain	3–3	1–1	2–1	3–1	1–0	—	4–0	0–2	1–3	0–1	0–0	3–0	1–1	3–1	3–3	5–2	1–2	2–2	8–0	2–1
Binéfar	0–0	1–2	0–4	2–2	2–1	1–1	—	1–1	2–1	2–1	0–1	2–1	0–1	2–3	1–2	1–1	0–4	1–0	2–0	0–2
Burgos	1–0	0–1	0–0	0–0	0–3	4–0	1–0	—	1–2	2–0	0–1	3–0	7–0	1–1	1–1	2–0	2–0	3–0	2–1	3–1
Calahorra	1–1	0–0	0–1	4–0	4–0	1–1	1–1	1–0	—	1–0	1–0	1–0	0–0	1–0	1–0	2–1	0–0	1–1	3–1	1–1
Chantrea	0–2	0–1	1–1	1–2	0–0	0–0	0–2	0–0	1–1	—	0–2	0–0	2–1	0–0	0–2	1–1	0–2	0–1	0–0	0–0
Cultural Leonesa	1–1	1–1	1–0	1–1	2–1	2–1	0–0	0–0	2–1	3–2	—	2–0	1–1	2–0	3–2	1–0	0–0	2–0	6–0	0–0
Eibar B	0–1	1–0	2–2	2–2	0–0	0–1	1–0	1–2	2–1	1–1	0–0	—	1–0	2–1	1–1	2–0	2–0	3–1	2–0	0–3
Gernika	0–0	2–0	0–1	1–1	1–1	0–0	0–1	0–0	1–1	2–1	0–0	2–1	—	1–1	0–2	1–1	1–0	1–1	0–0	0–0
Gim. Torrelavega	0–1	1–2	2–2	0–2	1–0	1–1	4–0	0–1	2–0	3–1	0–0	1–0	1–1	—	0–1	3–0	0–0	0–1	0–1	1–0
Osasuna B	3–0	2–0	2–0	1–0	0–0	1–1	0–0	0–1	0–0	1–1	1–0	0–1	1–0	1–1	—	0–1	1–0	0–1	1–0	0–2
Peña Sport	0–0	0–0	0–0	3–1	2–1	2–2	0–0	0–4	1–1	0–0	0–1	2–0	1–0	0–2	0–0	—	0–0	4–1	2–2	0–2
Racing B	1–0	1–2	1–3	2–1	2–1	2–3	0–0	0–0	0–1	1–2	2–3	1–1	1–2	0–0	0–0	1–1	—	0–0	1–1	2–3
Real Unión	1–1	2–0	1–1	3–1	5–1	2–2	1–0	1–1	0–2	0–1	0–1	1–0	2–1	0–0	1–3	4–1	1–1	—	2–0	0–2
Tropezón	1–1	0–1	0–1	0–1	0–2	1–3	0–1	1–2	1–2	2–0	0–0	1–0	1–1	0–2	0–0	1–0	0–1	1–2	—	1–0
Zaragoza B	0–1	3–0	1–2	1–0	0–0	1–0	0–0	2–1	0–0	1–0	3–1	0–0	1–1	0–0	3–0	4–2	1–0	0–0	5–0	—

Source: BDFutbol
Legend: Blue = home team win; Yellow = draw; Red = away team win.

=== Top goalscorers ===
Goalscorers	Goals	Team
(Spain) Egoitz Sukia	22	Beasain
(Spain) Aritz Mújika	16	Beasain
(Spain) José Manuel Redondo	15	Zaragoza B
(Spain) Nacho Rodríguez	11	Racing de Santander B
(Equatorial Guinea) Juan Cuyami	10	Burgos

=== Top goalkeepers ===
Goalkeeper	Goals	Matches	Average	Team
(Spain) Iñigo Arteaga	18	37	0.49	Burgos
(Spain) Iván Alonso	25	38	0.66	Cultural Leonesa
(Spain) Juan Elía	22	33	0.67	Osasuna B
(Spain) Urko Macías	24	32	0.75	Barakaldo
(Spain) Sergio Vera	29	35	0.83	Bilbao Athletic

== Group III ==
Teams from Balearic Islands, Castilla–La Mancha, Catalonia, Region of Murcia and Valencian Community.

=== Teams ===
Location of teams in Segunda División B Gr. 3 2000–01

Team	Founded	Home city	Stadium
Alzira	1946	Alzira, Valencian Community	Luis Suñer Picó
Barcelona B	1970	Barcelona, Catalonia	Mini Estadi
Benidorm	1964	Benidorm, Valencian Community	Foietes
Burriana	1949	Burriana, Valencian Community	San Fernando
Cartagonova	1995	Cartagena, Region of Murcia	Cartagonova
Castellón	1922	Castellón de la Plana, Valencian Community	Nou Castàlia
Conquense	1946	Cuenca, Castilla–La Mancha	La Fuensanta
Espanyol B	1981	Barcelona, Catalonia	Parc del Migdia / Camp de La Caixa
Figueres	1919	Figueres, Catalonia	Vilatenim
Gandía	1947	Gandia, Valencian Community	Guillermo Olagüe
Gimnàstic de Tarragona	1886	Tarragona, Catalonia	Nou Estadi
Gramenet	1994	Santa Coloma de Gramenet, Catalonia	Nou Camp Municipal
Hércules	1922	Alicante, Valencian Community	José Rico Pérez
L'Hospitalet	1957	L'Hospitalet de Llobregat, Catalonia	La Feixa Llarga
Mallorca B	1967	Palma, Balearic Islands	Lluís Sitjar
Mataró	1912	Mataró, Catalonia	Camp del Centenari
Novelda	1925	Novelda, Valencian Community	La Magdalena
Premià	1915	Premià de Mar, Catalonia	Municipal
Sabadell	1903	Sabadell, Catalonia	Nova Creu Alta
Terrassa	1906	Terrassa, Catalonia	Olímpic de Terrassa

=== League Table ===
Pos	Team	Pld	W	D	L	GF	GA	GD	Pts	Qualification or relegation
1	Gramenet	38	20	9	9	53	31	+22	69	Qualification for Play-Off
2	Gimnàstic	38	19	11	8	52	30	+22	68	Qualification for Play-Off
3	Sabadell	38	18	12	8	51	30	+21	66	Qualification for Play-Off
4	Espanyol B	38	19	7	12	57	34	+23	64	Qualification for Play-Off
5	Novelda	38	17	13	8	57	40	+17	64	
6	L'Hospitalet	38	18	9	11	73	45	+28	63	
7	Mallorca B	38	17	11	10	63	44	+19	62	
8	Figueres	38	16	8	14	55	47	+8	56	
9	FC Barcelona B	38	17	5	16	53	45	+8	56	
10	Castellón	38	14	12	12	40	39	+1	54	
11	Hércules	38	14	10	14	44	44	0	52	
12	Terrassa	38	12	12	14	48	41	+7	48	
13	Cartagena	38	12	10	16	35	49	−14	46	
14	Benidorm	38	11	11	16	37	46	−9	44	
15	Mataró	38	12	7	19	41	66	−25	43	
16	Conquense	38	11	10	17	26	49	−23	43	Qualification for Play-out
17	Burriana	38	9	13	16	27	48	−21	40	Relegation to 2001–02 Tercera División
18	Alzira	38	12	4	22	29	50	−21	40	Relegation to 2001–02 Tercera División
19	Gandía	38	9	11	18	31	46	−15	38	Relegation to 2001–02 Tercera División
20	Premià	38	5	11	22	29	77	−48	26	Relegation to 2001–02 Tercera División

Source: BDFutbol
Rules for classification: 1) points; 2) head-to-head points; 3) head-to-head goal difference; 4) head-to-head goals scored; 5) goal difference; 6) number of goals scored.

=== Results ===
Home \ Away	ALZ	BAR	BEN	BUR	CAR	CAS	CON	ESP	FIG	GAN	GIM	GRA	HÉR	HOS	MAL	MAT	NOV	PRE	SAB	TER
Alzira	—	2–0	2–1	0–2	1–3	2–0	2–0	1–0	1–2	1–0	1–1	1–2	0–1	1–0	3–3	1–0	0–2	2–1	0–1	0–0
Barcelona B	2–0	—	0–1	4–0	0–0	0–2	4–0	1–0	0–0	4–0	2–1	1–3	1–0	1–0	2–1	0–2	2–3	2–0	0–2	2–1
Benidorm	1–2	2–1	—	0–0	2–0	0–1	0–1	1–0	1–0	1–1	0–1	0–1	1–1	2–1	0–2	1–1	0–0	3–0	1–1	3–1
Burriana	1–0	1–0	1–1	—	1–0	1–1	0–0	0–1	2–0	1–0	1–1	0–1	1–0	0–2	1–2	0–0	2–2	0–0	0–1	2–1
Cartagonova	1–0	2–1	1–2	0–2	—	0–2	1–0	0–4	0–1	2–0	1–1	0–0	1–2	0–2	1–1	2–0	2–1	3–1	3–0	0–4
Castellón	3–0	0–0	1–0	0–0	1–1	—	1–0	1–2	0–2	2–1	0–1	1–0	0–1	1–1	0–0	1–0	3–0	4–0	1–4	2–0
Conquense	2–1	0–4	0–0	0–0	1–0	0–0	—	0–1	1–1	0–1	2–2	1–0	1–1	1–0	0–2	1–0	0–1	2–0	2–0	1–0
Espanyol B	3–0	0–1	2–1	1–1	1–0	3–1	0–0	—	2–1	2–1	0–0	1–1	3–1	4–0	0–3	3–2	3–0	6–0	2–1	1–2
Figueres	1–0	4–1	1–2	2–0	1–2	1–1	0–1	0–0	—	2–2	2–2	1–2	2–0	0–1	3–5	1–1	3–1	5–2	0–3	0–0
Gandía	2–0	2–4	1–0	2–1	0–1	0–0	0–0	2–1	1–3	—	1–1	0–2	0–0	1–1	0–1	0–0	1–1	0–0	0–2	2–0
Gimnàstic	4–0	2–0	1–0	2–0	1–1	1–2	2–1	1–0	1–0	1–0	—	3–1	3–1	5–1	1–2	1–1	0–1	0–1	0–0	2–1
Gramenet	3–1	2–3	2–1	2–0	3–0	1–1	1–0	4–1	1–2	2–2	0–2	—	3–2	0–0	1–0	1–0	0–0	0–1	0–0	3–0
Hércules	0–0	5–2	1–1	1–0	0–2	4–1	2–1	0–3	2–3	0–2	1–0	2–1	—	3–1	0–1	4–2	0–1	3–0	1–0	2–1
L'Hospitalet	2–1	1–1	8–1	2–1	2–0	6–1	7–1	1–0	1–0	4–1	2–1	1–1	0–0	—	5–0	3–1	3–2	7–1	3–1	1–5
Mallorca B	2–0	2–1	0–0	7–1	1–1	2–2	1–2	1–2	0–2	1–0	0–1	1–0	1–1	3–2	—	5–0	0–0	5–1	1–2	2–2
Mataró	2–1	1–3	2–1	3–1	3–1	1–0	4–2	0–0	1–2	1–0	0–1	1–4	2–1	2–1	2–1	—	1–0	1–1	0–1	2–4
Novelda	0–1	2–1	3–1	6–2	5–1	1–1	2–0	1–3	2–1	2–1	1–0	0–0	0–0	1–1	3–0	3–0	—	2–0	3–3	2–2
Premià	0–1	0–2	1–1	0–0	1–1	0–1	2–2	2–2	1–3	1–3	1–2	1–3	2–0	0–0	0–2	3–2	2–3	—	3–2	0–2
Sabadell	1–0	0–0	3–4	2–0	0–0	1–0	2–0	1–0	4–1	1–0	1–1	0–1	0–0	1–0	1–1	6–0	0–0	0–0	—	1–0
Terrassa	1–0	1–0	1–0	1–1	1–1	2–1	4–0	1–0	0–2	0–1	1–2	0–1	1–1	0–0	1–1	5–0	0–0	0–0	2–2	—

Source: BDFutbol
Legend: Blue = home team win; Yellow = draw; Red = away team win.

=== Top goalscorers ===
Goalscorers	Goals	Team
(Spain) Santi Castillejo	21	Gimnàstic
(Spain) Diego Torres	19	Sabadell
(Spain) Daniel Güiza	19	Mallorca B
(Spain) Keko Martínez	17	Figueres
(Spain) Monty	17	Terrassa

=== Top goalkeepers ===
Goalkeeper	Goals	Matches	Average	Team
(Spain) Antonio Morales	25	35	0.71	Gramenet
(Spain) Xavier Oliva	29	37	0.78	Gimnàstic
(Spain) Salvador Balbuena	23	28	0.82	Espanyol B
(Spain) José Miguel Morales	41	38	1.08	Terrassa
(Spain) Vicente Valero	34	31	1.1	Castellón

== Group IV ==
Teams from Andalusia, Castilla–La Mancha, Ceuta, Extremadura and Melilla.

=== Teams ===
Location of teams in Segunda División B Gr. 4 2000–01

Team	Founded	Home city	Stadium
Algeciras	1909	Algeciras, Andalusia	Nuevo Mirador
Almería	1989	Almería, Andalusia	Juan Rojas
Cádiz	1910	Cádiz, Andalusia	Ramón de Carranza
Ceuta	1996	Ceuta	Alfonso Murube
Coria	1923	Coria del Río, Andalusia	Guadalquivir
Don Benito	1928	Don Benito, Extremadura	Vicente Sanz
Dos Hermanas	1970	Dos Hermanas, Andalusia	Miguel Román García
Écija	1939	Écija, Andalusia	San Pablo
Poli Ejido	1969	El Ejido, Andalusia	Santo Domingo
Granada	1931	Granada, Andalusia	Nuevo Los Cármenes
Guadix	1932	Guadix, Andalusia	Municipal de Guadix
Jerez	1969	Jerez de los Caballeros, Extremadura	Manuel Calzado Galván
Linares	1990	Linares, Andalusia	Linarejos
Linense	1912	La Línea de la Concepción, Andalusia	Municipal La Línea de la Concepción
Melilla	1976	Melilla	Álvarez Claro
Motril	1984	Motril, Andalusia	Escribano Castilla
Poli Almería	1983	Almería, Andalusia	Juan Rojas
San Fernando	1940	San Fernando, Andalusia	Bahía Sur
Talavera	1948	Talavera de la Reina, Castilla–La Mancha	El Prado
Xerez	1947	Jerez de la Frontera, Andalusia	Chapín

=== League Table ===
Pos	Team	Pld	W	D	L	GF	GA	GD	Pts	Qualification or relegation
1	Cádiz	36	19	12	5	37	15	+22	69	Qualification for Play-Off
2	Ejido	36	18	12	6	40	25	+15	66	Qualification for Play-Off
3	Xerez	36	17	12	7	48	30	+18	63	Qualification for Play-Off
4	Ceuta	36	15	14	7	48	30	+18	59	Qualification for Play-Off
5	Granada	36	13	12	11	44	40	+4	51	
6	Coria	36	13	12	11	38	37	+1	51	
7	Dos Hermanas	36	12	13	11	38	34	+4	49	
8	Melilla	36	13	9	14	35	43	−8	48	
9	Jerez	36	12	11	13	36	34	+2	47	
10	Écija	36	10	16	10	27	30	−3	46	
11	Almería	36	10	16	10	41	37	+4	46	
12	San Fernando	36	10	15	11	26	26	0	45	
13	Linense	36	11	11	14	45	50	−5	44	
14	Talavera	36	11	10	15	29	40	−11	43	
15	Motril	36	10	12	14	30	39	−9	42	
16	Algeciras	36	9	14	13	36	40	−4	41	Qualification for Play-out
17	Guadix	36	10	9	17	28	46	−18	39	Relegation to 2001–02 Tercera División
18	Linares	36	8	13	15	28	36	−8	37	Relegation to 2001–02 Tercera División
19	Don Benito	36	4	11	21	20	42	−22	23	Relegation to 2001–02 Tercera División
20	Polideportivo Almería	0	0	0	0	0	0	0	0	Relegation to 2001–02 Tercera División

Source: BDFutbol
Rules for classification: 1) points; 2) head-to-head points; 3) head-to-head goal difference; 4) head-to-head goals scored; 5) goal difference; 6) number of goals scored.
Notes:

1. Polideportivo Almería withdrew after 18 games.

=== Results ===
Home \ Away	ALG	ALM	CAD	CEU	COR	DBE	DHE	ECI	EJI	GRA	GUA	JER	LNR	LNS	MEL	MOT	SFE	TAL	XER
Algeciras	—	0–1	0–0	1–3	6–3	1–0	1–1	1–2	2–2	1–2	2–1	1–0	0–0	3–2	3–1	1–0	0–0	1–2	0–0
Almería	1–1	—	0–1	0–1	1–1	1–1	1–3	0–1	0–0	1–0	0–1	1–1	3–0	1–0	1–0	3–0	4–1	2–2	2–2
Cádiz	1–0	0–0	—	1–0	1–0	2–1	2–0	0–0	1–1	1–0	3–1	2–4	0–1	0–0	1–0	1–1	1–0	0–1	1–1
Ceuta	1–0	2–1	0–0	—	1–1	1–0	1–2	3–1	0–0	1–1	2–1	0–0	1–0	2–2	4–0	2–0	0–0	1–0	0–1
Coria	0–0	3–0	0–4	1–0	—	1–0	2–0	2–0	0–1	0–0	1–0	0–0	1–1	3–1	2–0	1–0	0–1	1–1	1–2
Don Benito	1–1	2–0	3–0	1–1	1–0	—	0–0	0–2	0–1	1–3	0–1	0–0	2–1	1–2	0–0	0–1	0–0	0–0	1–3
Dos Hermanas	1–1	1–1	0–1	1–3	0–0	2–1	—	1–0	0–0	0–0	6–0	2–0	1–1	3–0	0–0	1–0	1–0	1–1	3–4
Écija	1–1	0–0	0–0	2–2	0–0	4–1	1–0	—	0–1	0–0	0–1	1–0	0–0	0–0	1–0	1–1	0–0	0–0	1–0
Poli Ejido	2–2	0–0	0–0	1–1	0–0	1–0	2–0	0–1	—	3–0	1–0	3–2	1–0	3–2	3–1	1–0	0–1	2–1	1–0
Granada	1–2	1–1	1–0	1–1	2–1	3–2	0–0	0–2	2–1	—	5–1	0–0	3–1	3–1	1–1	1–2	0–0	3–0	1–1
Guadix	0–0	1–1	0–2	0–3	1–2	1–0	0–2	2–0	1–1	0–1	—	2–0	1–1	3–3	1–1	0–0	1–0	1–0	1–0
Jerez	1–0	2–2	0–1	2–1	3–1	0–0	2–2	3–1	1–2	2–1	1–0	—	1–0	0–0	1–0	0–1	0–1	3–0	0–1
Linares	1–0	2–1	0–0	0–2	1–1	0–0	0–1	5–1	0–1	1–1	1–1	0–3	—	3–1	0–1	1–1	0–0	0–1	0–1
Linense	0–0	2–1	0–3	2–1	0–1	3–1	3–0	1–0	1–2	2–1	1–0	2–2	1–1	—	0–1	1–0	1–1	4–0	1–4
Melilla	3–2	2–3	0–1	4–2	0–4	1–0	2–2	1–0	1–0	0–1	0–2	1–1	1–0	2–1	—	2–0	2–1	2–0	1–1
Motril	1–0	0–1	0–0	0–2	2–4	1–0	2–0	1–1	1–1	3–1	2–1	2–0	2–3	0–2	1–1	—	1–0	1–1	1–1
San Fernando	3–1	1–4	0–1	1–1	0–0	0–0	1–0	1–1	1–0	3–0	1–1	2–0	0–1	0–0	1–2	1–1	—	3–1	1–0
Talavera	0–1	1–1	0–3	0–0	3–0	1–0	1–0	1–1	0–1	2–3	2–0	0–1	1–0	2–1	1–1	2–0	1–0	—	0–1
Xerez	2–0	1–1	0–2	2–2	4–0	3–0	0–1	1–1	3–1	2–1	1–0	1–0	0–2	2–2	1–0	1–1	0–0	1–0	—

Source: BDFutbol
Legend: Blue = home team win; Yellow = draw; Red = away team win.

=== Top goalscorers ===
Goalscorers	Goals	Team
(Spain) Sergio Cruz	16	Ejido
(Spain) Raúl Sánchez	16	Almería
(Portugal) Duda	13	Cádiz
(Spain) Aitor Huegun	13	Granada
(Spain) Fali Montes	12	Xerez

=== Top goalkeepers ===
Goalkeeper	Goals	Matches	Average	Team
(Spain) Armando Riveiro	14	36	0.39	Cádiz
(Spain) José Luis Martínez	21	35	0.6	San Fernando
(Spain) Fernando Marcos	22	35	0.63	Ejido
(Spain) Manu Cantero	28	35	0.8	Ceuta
(Spain) Ramón Martí	30	36	0.83	Xerez

== Play-offs ==
=== Group A ===
Pos	Team	Pld	W	D	L	GF	GA	GD	Pts	Promotion
1	Burgos (P)	6	5	1	0	7	1	+6	16	Promoted to Segunda División
2	Ceuta	6	3	1	2	9	4	+5	10	
3	Sabadell	6	2	0	4	6	11	−5	6	
4	Ourense	6	1	0	5	4	10	−6	3	

Source: futbolme
Rules for classification: 1) points; 2) head-to-head points; 3) head-to-head goal difference; 4) head-to-head goals scored; 5) goal difference; 6) number of goals scored.
(P) Promoted

=== Group B ===
Pos	Team	Pld	W	D	L	GF	GA	GD	Pts	Promotion
1	Ejido (P)	6	3	1	2	10	4	+6	10	Promoted to Segunda División
2	Atlético Madrid B	6	3	1	2	5	8	−3	10	
3	Calahorra	6	3	1	2	7	6	+1	10	
4	Espanyol B	6	1	1	4	4	8	−4	4	

Source: futbolme
Rules for classification: 1) points; 2) head-to-head points; 3) head-to-head goal difference; 4) head-to-head goals scored; 5) goal difference; 6) number of goals scored.
(P) Promoted

=== Group C ===
Pos	Team	Pld	W	D	L	GF	GA	GD	Pts	Promotion
1	Gimnàstic (P)	6	3	2	1	8	4	+4	11	Promoted to Segunda División
2	Cádiz	6	3	2	1	8	6	+2	11	
3	Amurrio	6	1	3	2	5	6	−1	6	
4	Zamora	6	0	3	3	2	7	−5	3	

Source: futbolme
Rules for classification: 1) points; 2) head-to-head points; 3) head-to-head goal difference; 4) head-to-head goals scored; 5) goal difference; 6) number of goals scored.
(P) Promoted

=== Group D ===
Pos	Team	Pld	W	D	L	GF	GA	GD	Pts	Promotion
1	Xerez (P)	6	4	1	1	11	4	+7	13	Promoted to Segunda División
2	Cultural Leonesa	6	4	0	2	8	3	+5	12	
3	Toledo	6	2	2	2	6	10	−4	8	
4	Gramenet	6	0	1	5	3	11	−8	1	

Source: futbolme
Rules for classification: 1) points; 2) head-to-head points; 3) head-to-head goal difference; 4) head-to-head goals scored; 5) goal difference; 6) number of goals scored.
(P) Promoted

== Play-out ==
=== Semifinal ===
Team 1	Agg.	Team 2	1st leg	2nd leg
Algeciras	2–2 (5–4 p)	Fuenlabrada	1–1	1–1
Binéfar	1–2	Conquense	0–0	1–2

=== Final ===
Team 1	Agg.	Team 2	1st leg	2nd leg
Binéfar	1–1 (a)	Fuenlabrada	0–0	1–1

Fuenlabrada was relegated after losing to Binéfar on away goals
