= 1993 Tercera División play-offs =

The 1993 Tercera División play-offs to Segunda División B from Tercera División (Promotion play-offs) were the final playoffs for the promotion from 1992–93 Tercera División to 1993–94 Segunda División B. The first four teams of each group (excluding reserve teams) took part in the play-off.

== Group A-1 ==
Pos	Team	Pld	W	D	L	GF	GA	GD	Pts	Promotion or Qualification
1	Langreo	6	3	2	1	7	5	+2	8	Promotion to Segunda División B
2	Villalonga	6	3	0	3	10	7	+3	6	
3	Fuenlabrada	6	2	2	2	8	9	−1	6	
4	Laguna	6	1	2	3	6	10	−4	4	

Updated to match(es) played on 27 June 1993. Source: RFEF

== Group A-2 ==
Pos	Team	Pld	W	D	L	GF	GA	GD	Pts	Promotion or Qualification
1	Arosa	6	4	2	0	10	1	+9	10	Promotion to Segunda División B
2	Moscardó	6	3	2	1	9	4	+5	8	
3	Ribert	6	2	0	4	4	10	−6	4	
4	Lealtad	6	0	2	4	2	10	−8	2	

Updated to match(es) played on 27 June 1993. Source: RFEF

== Group A-3 ==
Pos	Team	Pld	W	D	L	GF	GA	GD	Pts	Promotion or Qualification
1	San Sebastián de los Reyes	6	3	2	1	9	2	+7	8	Promotion to Segunda División B
2	Caudal	6	2	2	2	8	7	+1	6	
3	Viveiro	6	2	2	2	5	9	−4	6	
4	Atlético Bembibre	6	1	2	3	3	7	−4	4	

Updated to match(es) played on 27 June 1993. Source: RFEF

== Group A-4 ==
Pos	Team	Pld	W	D	L	GF	GA	GD	Pts	Promotion or Qualification
1	Real Madrid C	6	4	1	1	12	7	+5	9	Promotion to Segunda División B
2	Zamora	6	2	1	3	9	8	+1	5	
3	Siero	6	2	0	4	10	12	−2	4	
4	Carballiño	6	1	2	3	8	12	−4	4	

Updated to match(es) played on 27 June 1993. Source: RFEF

== Group B-1 ==
Pos	Team	Pld	W	D	L	GF	GA	GD	Pts	Promotion or Qualification
1	Touring	6	3	2	1	7	6	+1	8	Promotion to Segunda División B
2	Calahorra	6	3	1	2	7	8	−1	7	
3	Huesca	6	2	2	2	10	4	+6	6	
4	Laredo	6	1	1	4	6	12	−6	3	

Updated to match(es) played on 27 June 1993. Source: RFEF

== Group B-2 ==
Pos	Team	Pld	W	D	L	GF	GA	GD	Pts	Promotion or Qualification
1	Utebo	6	3	3	0	8	4	+4	9	Promotion to Segunda División B
2	Valle de Egüés	6	2	2	2	9	9	0	6	
3	Escobedo	6	2	1	3	7	6	+1	5	
4	Mondragón	6	1	2	3	3	8	−5	4	

Updated to match(es) played on 27 June 1993. Source: RFEF

== Group B-3 ==
Pos	Team	Pld	W	D	L	GF	GA	GD	Pts	Promotion or Qualification
1	Real Unión	6	6	0	0	15	4	+11	12	Promotion to Segunda División B
2	Rayo Cantabria	6	3	0	3	7	8	−1	6	
3	Mirandés	6	2	0	4	8	11	−3	4	
4	Casetas	6	1	0	5	4	11	−7	2	

Updated to match(es) played on 27 June 1993. Source: RFEF

== Group B-4 ==
Pos	Team	Pld	W	D	L	GF	GA	GD	Pts	Promotion or Qualification
1	Bermeo	6	3	3	0	11	1	+10	9	Promotion to Segunda División B
2	Barbastro	6	3	2	1	11	7	+4	8	
3	Peña Sport	6	2	2	2	7	6	+1	6	
4	Noja	6	0	1	5	2	17	−15	1	

Updated to match(es) played on 27 June 1993. Source: RFEF

== Group C-1 ==
Pos	Team	Pld	W	D	L	GF	GA	GD	Pts	Promotion or Qualification
1	Gramenet	6	5	0	1	8	2	+6	10	Promotion to Segunda División B
2	Pinoso	6	3	1	2	5	4	+1	7	
3	Mallorca Atlético	6	2	0	4	9	7	+2	4	
4	Mar Menor	6	1	1	4	2	11	−9	3	

Updated to match(es) played on 27 June 1993. Source: RFEF

== Group C-2 ==
Pos	Team	Pld	W	D	L	GF	GA	GD	Pts	Promotion or Qualification
1	Premià	6	5	1	0	16	5	+11	11	Promotion to Segunda División B
2	Crevillente	6	3	0	3	8	12	−4	6	
3	Roldán	6	2	1	3	6	6	0	5	
4	Platges de Calvià	6	1	0	5	5	12	−7	2	

Updated to match(es) played on 27 June 1993. Source: RFEF

== Group C-3 ==
Pos	Team	Pld	W	D	L	GF	GA	GD	Pts	Promotion or Qualification
1	Manacor	6	4	1	1	11	5	+6	9	Promotion to Segunda División B
2	Rubí	6	2	1	3	12	9	+3	5	
3	Caravaca	6	1	2	3	4	9	−5	4	
4	Oliva	6	1	2	3	3	7	−4	4	

Updated to match(es) played on 27 June 1993. Source: RFEF

== Group C-4 ==
Pos	Team	Pld	W	D	L	GF	GA	GD	Pts	Promotion or Qualification
1	Cieza	6	4	2	0	11	1	+10	10	Promotion to Segunda División B
2	Villena	6	3	0	3	8	11	−3	6	
3	Júpiter	6	2	1	3	7	8	−1	5	
4	Santa Eulàlia	6	1	1	4	3	9	−6	3	

Updated to match(es) played on 27 June 1993. Source: RFEF

== Group D-1 ==
Pos	Team	Pld	W	D	L	GF	GA	GD	Pts	Promotion or Qualification
1	Atlético Malagueño	6	4	2	0	10	2	+8	10	Promotion to Segunda División B
2	Cristian Lay	6	4	1	1	14	5	+9	9	
3	Mairena	6	1	1	4	4	10	−6	3	
4	Manzanares	6	0	2	4	4	15	−11	2	

Updated to match(es) played on 27 June 1993. Source: RFEF

== Group D-2 ==
Pos	Team	Pld	W	D	L	GF	GA	GD	Pts	Promotion or Qualification
1	Almería	6	3	2	1	9	4	+5	8	Promotion to Segunda División B
2	Atlético Cortegana	6	2	4	0	9	5	+4	8	
3	Plasencia	6	2	2	2	10	11	−1	6	
4	Manchego	6	1	0	5	5	13	−8	2	

Updated to match(es) played on 27 June 1993. Source: RFEF

== Group D-3 ==
Pos	Team	Pld	W	D	L	GF	GA	GD	Pts	Promotion or Qualification
1	Talavera	6	5	1	0	9	2	+7	11	Promotion to Segunda División B
2	Polideportivo Almería	6	3	1	2	8	6	+2	7	
3	San Juan	6	2	0	4	13	10	+3	4	
4	Don Benito	6	1	0	5	6	18	−12	2	

Updated to match(es) played on 27 June 1993. Source: RFEF

== Group D-4 ==
Pos	Team	Pld	W	D	L	GF	GA	GD	Pts	Promotion or Qualification
1	Mármol Macael	6	3	3	0	9	3	+6	9	Promotion to Segunda División B
2	Conquense	6	3	2	1	12	7	+5	8	
3	San Fernando	6	1	2	3	7	13	−6	4	
4	Moralo	6	0	3	3	3	8	−5	3	

Updated to match(es) played on 27 June 1993. Source: RFEF

== Group E ==
Pos	Team	Pld	W	D	L	GF	GA	GD	Pts	Promotion or Qualification
1	Realejos	6	4	0	2	13	7	+6	8	Promotion to Segunda División B
2	Telde	6	3	2	1	8	6	+2	8	
3	Laguna de Tenerife	6	2	1	3	8	12	−4	5	
4	Orotava	6	1	1	4	8	12	−4	3	

Updated to match(es) played on 27 June 1993. Source: RFEF

== See also ==
- 1992–93 Tercera División
