= 1993–94 Segunda División B =

Segunda División B
- Season: 1993–94
- Promoted: Getafe; Salamanca; Ourense; Extremadura
- Relegated: Cultural Leonesa; Tomelloso; Ponferradina; Celta de Vigo B Baskonia; Andorra; Utebo; Touring; Rubí; Peña Deportiva; Cieza; Manacor; Ejido; Málaga; Estepona; Maspalomas; Arosa
- Top goalscorer: Julio Engonga (28 goals)
- Best goalkeeper: Alfonso Núñez (0.34 goals)
- Biggest home win: Sant Andreu 10–0 Manacor (20 February 1994)
- Biggest away win: Andorra 0–5 Alavés (7 November 1993); Granada 0–5 Realejos (14 November 1993); Estepona 1–6 Córdoba (17 April 1994)
- Highest scoring: Sant Andreu 10–0 Manacor (20 February 1994)

The season 1993–94 of Segunda División B of Spanish football started August 1993 and ended May 1994.

== Summary before the 1993–94 season ==
Playoffs de Ascenso:

- Leganés (P)
- Salamanca
- Toledo (P)
- Getafe
- Alavés
- Barakaldo
- Gimnástica de Torrelavega
- Palencia
- Murcia (P)
- Sant Andreu
- Elche
- Hércules (P)
- Las Palmas
- Xerez
- Granada
- Jaén

Relegated from Segunda División:

- Figueres
- Lugo
- Sestao
- Sabadell

Promoted from Tercera División:

- Langreo (from Group 2)
- Arosa (from Group 1)
- SS Reyes (from Group 7)
- Real Madrid C (from Group 7)
- Touring (from Group 4)
- Utebo (from Group 16)
- Real Unión (from Group 4)
- Bermeo (from Group 4)
- Gramenet (from Group 5)
- Premià (from Group 5)
- Manacor (from Group 11)
- Cieza (from Group 13)
- Málaga (from Group 9)
- Almería (from Group 9)
- Talavera (from Group 17)
- Mármol Macael (from Group 9)
- Realejos (from Group 12)

Relegated:

- As Pontes
- Valdepeñas
- Aranjuez
- RSD Alcalá
- Hernani
- Zaragoza B
- Elgoibar
- Santurtzi
- Torrevieja
- Orihuela
- Llíria
- Sporting Mahonés
- Horadada
- Betis B
- Linense
- Marino
- Portuense

Administrative relegation:

- Ibiza (financial trouble)

Occupied the vacant spots by administrative relegations:

- Rubí (occupied the vacant spot of Ibiza)

== Group I ==
Teams from Asturias, Castile and Leon, Castilla–La Mancha, Galicia and Madrid.

=== Teams ===
Location of teams in Segunda División B Gr. 1 1993–94

Team	Founded	Home city	Stadium
Arosa	1945	Vilagarcía de Arousa, Galicia	A Lomba
Atlético Madrid B	1969	Madrid, Madrid	Vicente Calderón
Real Ávila	1923	Ávila, Castile and Leon	Adolfo Suárez
Real Avilés Industrial	1903	Avilés, Asturias	Román Sánchez Puerta
Celta Turista	1927	Vigo, Galicia	Barreiro
Cultural Leonesa	1923	León, Castile and Leon	Antonio Amilvia
Getafe	1983	Getafe, Madrid	Las Margaritas
Langreo	1961	Langreo, Asturias	Ganzábal
Lugo	1953	Lugo, Galicia	Anxo Carro
Orense	1952	Ourense, Galicia	O Couto
Real Oviedo B	1930	Oviedo, Asturias	Carlos Tartiere
Ponferradina	1922	Ponferrada, Castile and Leon	Fuentesnuevas
Pontevedra	1941	Pontevedra, Galicia	Pasarón
Racing Ferrol	1919	Ferrol, Galicia	A Malata
Real Madrid C	1952	Madrid, Madrid	Ciudad Deportiva
Salamanca	1923	Salamanca, Castile and Leon	Helmántico
San Sebastián de los Reyes	1971	San Sebastián de los Reyes, Madrid	Matapiñonera
Sporting Gijón B	1960	Gijón, Asturias	Mareo
Talavera	1948	Talavera de la Reina, Castilla–La Mancha	El Prado
Tomelloso	1979	Tomelloso, Castilla–La Mancha	Municipal

=== League table ===
Pos	Team	Pld	W	D	L	GF	GA	GD	Pts	Qualification or relegation
1	Salamanca	38	23	10	5	71	26	+45	56	Qualification for Play-Off
2	Getafe	38	17	16	5	53	31	+22	50	Qualification for Play-Off
3	Ourense	38	20	8	10	64	53	+11	48	Qualification for Play-Off
4	Langreo	38	16	11	11	60	60	0	43	Qualification for Play-Off
5	Pontevedra	38	14	13	11	51	41	+10	41	
6	Atlético Madrid B	38	14	12	12	54	44	+10	40	
7	Real Madrid C	38	15	10	13	63	55	+8	40	
8	Lugo	38	13	12	13	38	42	−4	38	
9	SS Reyes	38	13	11	14	49	48	+1	37	
10	Real Ávila	38	10	17	11	33	42	−9	37	
11	Real Oviedo B	38	11	15	12	39	38	+1	37	
12	Sporting de Gijón B	38	16	5	17	45	42	+3	37	
13	Racing Ferrol	38	12	12	14	54	58	−4	36	
14	Talavera	38	12	11	15	41	44	−3	35	
15	Real Avilés	38	10	14	14	43	55	−12	34	
16	Arosa	38	11	11	16	42	48	−6	33	Qualification for Play-out
17	Cultural Leonesa	38	11	10	17	38	53	−15	32	Relegation to 1994–95 Tercera División
18	Tomelloso	38	8	16	14	29	42	−13	32	Relegation to 1994–95 Tercera División
19	Ponferradina	38	9	10	19	39	56	−17	28	Relegation to 1994–95 Tercera División
20	Celta Turista	38	8	10	20	45	73	−28	26	Relegation to 1994–95 Tercera División

Source: BDFútbol
Rules for classification: 1) points; 2) head-to-head points; 3) head-to-head goal difference; 4) head-to-head goals scored; 5) goal difference; 6) number of goals scored.

=== Results ===
Home \ Away	ARO	ATL	AVA	AVS	CEL	CUL	GET	LNG	LUG	ORE	OVI	PNF	PNT	RFE	RMC	SAL	SSR	SPG	TAL	TOM
Arosa	—	0–0	4–0	0–0	1–1	1–0	0–0	5–0	2–1	2–1	1–1	1–0	1–2	2–0	1–2	0–2	3–0	1–2	1–0	0–1
Atlético Madrid B	5–1	—	1–1	3–0	1–1	1–1	1–2	1–2	3–0	4–1	1–0	4–0	0–4	2–2	3–1	2–1	0–0	0–1	3–1	0–2
Real Ávila	1–0	1–1	—	2–1	3–1	0–0	1–1	1–2	0–0	0–0	0–0	1–1	1–1	3–0	0–0	0–1	1–1	0–0	2–1	3–1
Real Avilés Ind.	1–0	1–1	1–1	—	1–3	2–0	1–1	1–1	3–0	0–2	3–1	1–0	2–1	2–3	2–2	0–0	2–2	2–1	1–2	1–1
Celta Turista	2–2	0–1	2–0	1–4	—	2–0	0–3	4–2	2–0	0–1	0–0	2–3	2–0	1–1	2–5	0–2	2–3	0–3	1–6	1–1
Cultural Leonesa	1–1	0–1	1–1	0–0	3–1	—	1–2	0–2	2–0	2–2	0–1	2–1	1–5	1–5	1–0	0–0	3–0	3–1	1–2	1–0
Getafe	1–0	0–0	0–1	6–0	2–1	0–0	—	1–1	0–1	2–0	3–1	2–2	2–0	4–2	1–1	1–0	0–0	2–0	0–0	3–1
Langreo	4–2	3–0	5–2	1–1	2–0	1–2	1–1	—	1–1	0–1	0–3	2–1	1–0	3–1	1–3	1–1	2–1	1–0	4–2	2–2
Lugo	0–0	1–1	2–0	2–0	1–1	3–0	1–1	1–0	—	1–1	1–0	2–0	2–2	2–1	1–0	1–0	3–0	1–1	2–2	2–0
Orense	3–0	3–3	3–0	1–0	1–3	4–1	4–1	0–3	2–1	—	2–0	1–1	4–2	4–1	2–2	2–0	2–1	3–1	3–2	3–0
Real Oviedo B	0–0	0–1	0–2	4–0	1–0	2–0	2–2	1–2	0–0	4–0	—	1–1	1–1	2–1	1–1	2–2	2–1	1–0	0–0	0–0
Ponferradina	1–1	2–2	2–0	1–0	3–4	1–2	0–1	3–2	1–0	1–1	0–1	—	0–0	2–2	1–2	1–1	2–0	4–1	1–0	0–1
Pontevedra	1–2	0–2	2–0	1–1	3–0	1–1	2–1	2–2	2–2	1–0	3–2	1–0	—	0–0	1–0	0–1	4–0	2–1	0–0	1–0
Racing Ferrol	2–0	1–0	1–1	1–2	1–1	2–1	2–2	1–1	2–1	4–1	0–0	1–0	0–1	—	2–0	1–4	2–0	1–0	2–2	1–1
Real Madrid C	4–2	1–0	1–1	2–4	4–1	1–2	0–1	4–1	2–1	1–1	3–1	6–0	2–1	3–3	—	1–1	1–4	2–1	2–0	0–0
Salamanca	3–0	3–2	1–0	3–0	0–0	2–0	3–1	2–2	5–0	4–0	3–1	0–2	3–2	2–0	3–0	—	4–0	2–0	3–0	2–1
SS Reyes	1–0	2–1	1–2	2–2	1–1	1–3	0–1	6–0	2–0	4–1	4–0	2–0	0–0	3–1	0–2	1–1	—	2–0	0–0	2–0
Sporting Gijón B	3–0	2–0	3–0	1–0	5–1	2–1	1–1	0–1	2–0	0–1	0–3	2–1	0–0	1–0	3–1	0–3	0–2	—	2–0	0–0
Talavera	1–1	3–1	0–1	0–0	1–0	1–0	0–1	3–1	1–0	0–1	0–0	2–0	3–1	3–2	2–0	1–2	0–0	0–2	—	0–3
Tomelloso	1–4	0–2	0–0	2–1	2–1	1–1	0–0	0–0	0–1	1–2	0–0	2–0	1–1	0–2	3–1	1–1	0–0	0–3	0–0	—

Source: BDFútbol
Legend: Blue = home team win; Yellow = draw; Red = away team win.

=== Top goalscorers ===
Goalscorers	Goals	Team
(Spain) Antonio Marcos	22	Ponferradina
(Spain) Ignacio Arteaga	21	Real Madrid C
(Spain) Juan Carlos Gómez	21	Atlético Madrid B
(Spain) Santi Fernández	18	Ourense
(Spain) Javi Prendes	18	Avilés

=== Top goalkeepers ===
Goalkeeper	Goals	Matches	Average	Team
(Spain) Roberto Olabe	21	34	0.62	Salamanca
(Spain) Pedro Caballero	25	33	0.76	Getafe
(Spain) Lino Fervenza	35	33	1.06	Pontevedra
(Spain) Javi Jiménez	42	38	1.11	Ávila
(Spain) Ricardo López	40	35	1.14	Atlético Madrid B

== Group II ==
Teams from Aragon, Basque Country, Cantabria, Castile and Leon, La Rioja and Navarre.

=== Teams ===
Location of teams in Segunda División B Gr. 2 1993–94

Team	Founded	Home city	Stadium
Alavés	1921	Vitoria-Gasteiz, Basque Country	Mendizorroza
Andorra	1957	Andorra, Aragon	Juan Antonio Endeiza
Barakaldo	1917	Barakaldo, Basque Country	Lasesarre
Basconia	1913	Basauri, Basque Country	Basozelai
Beasain	1905	Beasain, Basque Country	Loinaz
Bermeo	1950	Bermeo, Basque Country	Itxas Gane
Gimnástica de Torrelavega	1907	Torrelavega, Cantabria	El Malecón
Izarra	1924	Estella-Lizarra, Navarre	Merkatondoa
Lemona	1923	Lemoa, Basque Country	Arlonagusia
Logroñés B	1950	Logroño, La Rioja	Las Gaunas
Numancia	1945	Soria, Castile and León	Los Pajaritos
Osasuna B	1962	Aranguren, Navarre	Tajonar
Palencia	1975	Palencia, Castile and León	La Balastera
Real Sociedad B	1951	San Sebastián, Basque Country	Anoeta
Real Unión	1915	Irun, Basque Country	Stadium Gal
Sestao	1916	Sestao, Basque Country	Las Llanas
Touring	1923	Errenteria, Basque Country	Fandería
Tudelano	1935	Tudela, Navarre	José Antonio Elola
Utebo	1924	Utebo, Aragon	Santa Ana
Valladolid B	1942	Valladolid, Castile and León	Anexo José Zorrilla

=== League Table ===
Pos	Team	Pld	W	D	L	GF	GA	GD	Pts	Qualification or relegation
1	Alavés	38	24	12	2	71	17	+54	60	Qualification for Play-Off
2	Sestao	38	20	12	6	56	17	+39	52	Qualification for Play-Off
3	Numancia	38	23	6	9	50	30	+20	52	Qualification for Play-Off
4	Barakaldo	38	18	12	8	58	36	+22	48	Qualification for Play-Off
5	Bermeo	38	16	15	7	42	32	+10	47	
6	Beasain	38	14	12	12	45	33	+12	40	
7	Real Sociedad B	38	15	9	14	50	39	+11	39	
8	Osasuna B	38	13	12	13	44	50	−6	38	
9	Logroñés B	38	14	10	14	46	42	+4	38	
10	Lemona	38	12	14	12	46	39	+7	38	
11	Gimnástica de Torrelavega	38	14	8	16	49	39	+10	36	
12	Izarra	38	14	8	16	40	39	+1	36	
13	Tudelano	38	10	15	13	38	43	−5	35	
14	Real Unión	38	10	14	14	37	44	−7	34	
15	Palencia	38	8	18	12	33	48	−15	34	
16	Valladolid B	38	11	11	16	32	52	−20	33	Qualification for Play-out
17	Basconia	38	11	11	16	38	67	−29	33	Relegation to 1994–95 Tercera División
18	Andorra	38	9	13	16	41	54	−13	31	Relegation to 1994–95 Tercera División
19	Utebo	38	6	10	22	18	59	−41	22	Relegation to 1994–95 Tercera División
20	Touring	38	4	6	28	28	82	−54	14	Relegation to 1994–95 Tercera División

Source: BDFútbol
Rules for classification: 1) points; 2) head-to-head points; 3) head-to-head goal difference; 4) head-to-head goals scored; 5) goal difference; 6) number of goals scored.

=== Results ===
Home \ Away	ALV	AND	BAR	BAS	BEA	BER	GIM	IZA	LEM	LOG	NUM	OSA	PAL	RSO	RUN	SES	TOU	TUD	UTE	VLD
Alavés	—	0–0	2–0	8–2	1–0	1–2	4–0	2–1	2–2	1–0	1–0	5–0	4–0	1–1	3–1	1–1	2–1	4–0	6–0	1–0
Andorra	0–5	—	2–0	1–1	2–0	3–3	1–0	0–1	2–2	1–1	1–2	0–0	2–0	4–1	0–1	0–1	5–0	1–1	2–0	1–1
Barakaldo	1–0	2–0	—	2–0	2–1	2–4	2–1	0–0	1–1	4–1	2–0	0–1	1–1	3–3	6–1	1–1	3–1	3–2	3–0	1–1
Basconia	0–3	1–1	1–1	—	0–0	0–2	1–0	0–1	1–0	3–1	0–2	4–2	2–2	1–0	0–0	2–1	2–1	0–2	4–1	0–0
Beasain	0–2	0–1	0–2	5–0	—	1–2	0–0	3–0	1–1	3–1	1–1	4–1	1–0	1–0	0–0	2–1	2–1	1–1	5–0	1–1
Bermeo	0–0	3–1	2–4	0–1	0–0	—	0–0	1–0	0–0	2–1	0–0	1–0	4–1	1–0	1–0	0–0	2–0	1–1	0–0	0–1
Gimn. Torrelavega	0–1	3–1	1–0	4–1	2–1	0–1	—	4–2	0–1	0–0	6–0	1–1	1–2	0–2	0–1	1–0	1–0	3–1	3–1	3–0
Izarra	2–2	2–1	0–1	3–0	1–0	0–0	2–3	—	1–0	0–0	0–1	3–0	3–0	0–1	1–1	1–2	4–1	0–1	1–0	1–2
Lemona	0–1	1–1	0–2	0–0	2–0	0–0	2–2	1–2	—	1–1	2–1	2–1	0–0	5–0	1–0	0–1	8–2	1–1	2–0	2–1
Logroñés B	1–1	5–2	0–0	5–0	0–1	4–2	1–0	1–0	2–0	—	0–2	1–2	2–0	1–0	1–0	0–1	2–0	1–3	1–0	0–0
Numancia	0–1	5–1	0–0	2–0	0–1	1–0	1–0	1–0	2–0	0–3	—	4–1	1–0	3–2	2–0	1–0	2–0	2–0	2–0	3–0
Osasuna B	1–1	3–1	1–1	5–0	1–1	2–0	1–0	1–0	1–0	2–0	0–0	—	1–2	1–1	1–2	1–1	1–1	2–1	3–0	1–0
Palencia	1–1	0–0	1–1	3–1	1–1	0–0	0–0	0–0	1–2	1–1	2–0	3–2	—	0–1	0–0	1–1	1–0	1–1	3–0	0–3
Real Sociedad B	0–1	1–0	0–1	1–0	1–1	1–2	1–0	3–0	3–2	3–0	0–0	3–0	4–0	—	0–1	1–1	1–1	3–0	0–1	7–0
Real Unión	0–0	2–0	2–0	3–5	1–1	0–0	1–1	1–1	1–1	2–0	0–1	3–0	1–1	1–2	—	1–1	3–2	0–0	0–2	3–0
Sestao	0–0	4–0	2–0	0–0	2–0	4–0	1–0	0–0	2–0	0–1	2–0	0–0	5–0	3–0	3–0	—	1–0	2–0	3–0	4–0
Touring	0–1	1–3	0–3	1–1	0–3	1–3	0–3	0–2	0–1	2–2	3–4	2–1	0–4	0–1	3–2	1–0	—	1–1	0–0	1–0
Tudelano	0–1	0–0	2–2	0–0	1–2	1–1	0–0	4–0	1–2	1–1	0–2	0–1	0–0	1–0	2–2	0–2	3–1	—	2–0	1–0
Utebo	0–0	0–0	1–0	1–3	1–0	1–1	1–3	1–2	0–0	1–4	0–1	0–0	0–0	0–0	1–0	1–2	3–0	0–1	—	1–1
Valladolid B	0–1	1–0	0–1	3–1	0–1	0–1	4–3	0–3	2–1	1–0	1–1	2–2	1–1	2–2	1–0	1–1	1–0	0–2	1–0	—

Source: BDFútbol
Legend: Blue = home team win; Yellow = draw; Red = away team win.

=== Top goalscorers ===
Goalscorers	Goals	Team
(Equatorial Guinea) Julio Engonga	28	Gimnástica de Torrelavega
(Spain) Juan Carlos Lasheras	26	Alavés
(Spain) Jon Zamarripa	23	Barakaldo
(Spain) Iñigo Sáenz	18	Numancia
(Spain) Aitor Bouzo	17	Sestao

=== Top goalkeepers ===
Goalkeeper	Goals	Matches	Average	Team
(Spain) Alfonso Núñez	12	35	0.34	Alavés
(Spain) Tito Subero	17	38	0.45	Sestao
(Spain) Laureano Echevarría	24	37	0.65	Numancia
(Spain) Luis Gandiaga	22	28	0.79	Gimnástica de Torrelavega
(Spain) Iñigo Arteaga	24	29	0.83	Real Sociedad B

== Group III ==
Teams from Andorra, Balearic Islands, Catalonia, Region of Murcia and Valencian Community

=== Teams ===
Location of teams in Segunda División B Gr. 3 1993–94

Team	Founded	Home city	Stadium
Alcoyano	1928	Alcoy, Valencian Community	El Collao
FC Andorra	1942	Andorra la Vella, Andorra	Comunal
Benidorm	1964	Benidorm, Valencian Community	Foietes
Cartagena FC	1940	Cartagena, Region of Murcia	Cartagonova
Cieza	1970	Cieza, Region of Murcia	La Arboleja
Elche	1923	Elche, Valencian Community	Martínez Valero
Figueres	1919	Figueres, Catalonia	Vilatenim
Gimnàstic de Tarragona	1886	Tarragona, Catalonia	Nou Estadi Tarragona
Girona	1930	Girona, Catalonia	Montilivi
Gramenet	1945	Santa Coloma de Gramenet, Catalonia	Nou Camp Municipal
Hospitalet	1957	L'Hospitalet de Llobregat, Catalonia	Municipal de Deportes
Levante	1909	Valencia, Valencian Community	Nou Estadi Llevant
Manacor	1923	Manacor, Balearic Islands	Na Capellera
Manlleu	1933	Manlleu, Catalonia	Municipal
Peña Deportiva	1935	Santa Eulària des Riu, Balearic Islands	Municipal Santa Eulària
Premià	1915	Premià de Mar, Catalonia	Municipal Premià
Rubí	1912	Rubí, Catalonia	Can Rosés
Sant Andreu	1909	Barcelona, Catalonia	Narcís Sala
Valencia B	1944	Valencia, Valencian Community	Ciudad Deportiva de Paterna
Yeclano	1950	Yecla, Region of Murcia	La Constitución

=== League Table ===
Pos	Team	Pld	W	D	L	GF	GA	GD	Pts	Qualification or relegation
1	Gramenet	38	24	10	4	67	27	+40	58	Qualification for Play-Off
2	Manlleu	38	19	10	9	57	40	+17	48	Qualification for Play-Off
3	Levante	38	18	11	9	56	34	+22	47	Qualification for Play-Off
4	Figueres	38	14	18	6	46	28	+18	46	Qualification for Play-Off
5	Cartagena FC	38	17	11	10	45	30	+15	45	
6	L'Hospitalet	38	16	13	9	65	37	+28	45	
7	Sant Andreu	38	16	12	10	62	34	+28	44	
8	Benidorm	38	12	18	8	40	36	+4	42	
9	Alcoyano	38	12	17	9	53	42	+11	41	
10	Yeclano	38	14	11	13	42	34	+8	39	
11	Gimnàstic	38	15	9	14	56	47	+9	39	
12	Elche	38	13	12	13	42	34	+8	38	
13	Valencia Mestalla	38	12	13	13	51	50	+1	37	
14	FC Andorra	38	11	13	14	45	51	−6	35	
15	Girona	38	11	11	16	36	60	−24	33	
16	Premià	38	11	11	16	49	60	−11	33	Qualification for Play-out
17	Rubí	38	9	15	14	41	54	−13	33	Relegation to 1994–95 Tercera División
18	Peña Deportiva	38	5	9	24	28	74	−46	19	Relegation to 1994–95 Tercera División
19	Cieza	38	8	3	27	32	85	−53	19	Relegation to 1994–95 Tercera División
20	Manacor	38	6	7	25	22	78	−56	19	Relegation to 1994–95 Tercera División

Source: BDFútbol
Rules for classification: 1) points; 2) head-to-head points; 3) head-to-head goal difference; 4) head-to-head goals scored; 5) goal difference; 6) number of goals scored.

=== Results ===
Home \ Away	ALC	AND	BEN	CAR	CIE	ELC	FIG	GIM	GIR	GRA	HOS	LEV	MNC	MNL	PEÑ	PRE	RUB	SAN	VAL	YEC
Alcoyano	—	1–1	0–1	0–1	6–2	0–0	2–2	3–0	2–1	0–0	1–2	1–1	4–1	2–0	3–2	2–3	3–2	1–1	3–1	2–2
FC Andorra	1–3	—	1–1	2–1	6–0	2–3	1–1	3–2	1–1	0–0	1–3	1–1	2–1	0–2	0–2	1–0	3–0	0–1	2–0	1–0
Benidorm	1–2	2–2	—	0–0	2–0	1–1	1–0	0–0	2–0	0–2	0–0	1–0	2–0	3–0	3–1	0–0	1–0	0–4	1–1	0–0
Cartagena FC	1–1	1–0	1–1	—	3–0	3–2	0–0	0–1	3–1	0–0	1–0	3–0	2–0	1–3	2–0	1–1	3–1	0–0	3–0	1–0
Cieza	2–1	0–3	1–3	1–0	—	0–1	3–1	1–1	1–1	1–0	1–3	1–2	2–1	1–1	5–1	1–0	3–1	0–2	0–1	0–2
Elche	1–1	2–0	1–1	1–1	6–0	—	0–1	2–0	3–0	0–0	3–1	0–2	3–0	1–1	2–0	1–1	0–1	1–0	0–0	1–0
Figueres	0–0	1–0	0–0	1–1	3–0	0–0	—	3–0	2–2	0–0	1–1	0–0	3–0	0–0	5–0	3–0	2–1	1–0	0–0	1–0
Gimnàstic	2–0	1–1	2–1	0–0	3–0	0–1	1–2	—	6–2	0–1	3–3	4–1	0–1	3–1	0–0	2–1	0–3	2–1	3–1	0–2
Girona	1–1	1–0	0–1	2–1	1–0	1–1	1–0	0–4	—	0–1	2–0	0–2	4–1	0–0	1–1	1–1	1–0	1–0	1–1	1–4
Gramenet	2–0	5–1	4–2	1–0	3–0	3–1	1–1	3–2	4–1	—	0–2	1–1	3–0	0–1	4–0	1–1	3–2	1–1	4–0	1–0
Hospitalet	0–0	1–1	1–2	0–1	4–1	0–0	1–1	1–1	5–1	1–2	—	0–1	5–1	3–1	3–0	3–1	1–1	1–2	3–0	5–1
Levante	1–1	0–1	1–0	0–1	4–1	3–1	2–1	3–0	2–1	2–3	0–2	—	3–0	2–0	5–1	2–0	3–0	0–1	2–1	1–0
Manacor	2–0	0–2	0–0	1–2	1–0	2–0	0–2	0–5	1–2	1–3	1–1	0–0	—	0–2	0–2	1–0	2–0	1–1	0–2	0–1
Manlleu	2–2	2–0	1–1	3–1	2–1	2–0	1–1	2–1	2–0	2–0	1–0	1–0	2–0	—	3–1	0–0	1–2	2–0	4–1	3–3
Peña Deportiva	1–3	1–1	1–1	0–1	2–1	0–2	0–1	0–0	0–0	0–1	0–1	0–0	0–0	0–1	—	3–1	1–1	0–2	0–2	1–0
Premià	1–0	1–1	3–2	2–0	3–0	1–0	3–4	2–2	0–1	2–5	1–4	1–4	2–0	0–1	5–3	—	2–2	2–0	2–1	2–1
Rubí	0–0	3–0	1–1	1–0	2–0	1–0	1–1	1–3	1–1	0–1	0–0	2–2	1–1	2–2	3–2	2–2	—	2–0	1–1	0–0
Sant Andreu	1–1	1–1	1–1	0–2	2–0	1–0	2–1	0–1	4–0	1–2	3–3	1–1	10–0	3–2	6–1	2–2	2–0	—	0–0	4–0
Valencia B	0–1	5–1	1–1	2–2	4–1	1–0	0–0	0–1	2–1	1–2	0–1	2–2	2–2	3–2	4–1	1–0	7–1	1–1	—	1–0
Yeclano	0–0	1–1	3–0	2–1	3–1	3–1	3–0	1–0	0–1	0–0	0–0	0–0	3–0	2–1	2–1	2–0	0–0	0–1	1–1	—

Source: BDFútbol
Legend: Blue = home team win; Yellow = draw; Red = away team win.

=== Top goalscorers ===
Goalscorers	Goals	Team
(Spain) Antonio Barnils	21	Manlleu
(Spain) Quini	19	Levante
(Spain) Ángel Dolz	17	Gramenet
(Spain) Jordi Romero	15	Gramenet
(Spain) Siscu Jiménez	15	Manlleu

=== Top goalkeepers ===
Goalkeeper	Goals	Matches	Average	Team
(Spain) Juan Manuel López	24	36	0.67	Gramenet
(Spain) Emilio López	27	37	0.73	Figueres
(Spain) Rodri	25	34	0.74	Levante
(Spain) José Martín-Delgado	25	34	0.74	Benidorm
(Spain) Fernando Marcos	23	30	0.77	Cartagena FC

== Group IV ==
Teams from Andalusia, Canary Islands, Extremadura and Melilla.

=== Teams ===
Location of teams in Segunda División B Gr. 4 1993–94
Canary Islands

Team	Founded	Home city	Stadium
Almería	1989	Almería, Andalusia	Juan Rojas
Cacereño	1919	Cáceres, Extremadura	Príncipe Felipe
Córdoba	1954	Córdoba, Andalusia	Nuevo Arcángel
Écija Balompié	1939	Écija, Andalusia	San Pablo
Ejido	1969	El Ejido, Andalusia	Santo Domingo
Estepona	1947	Estepona, Andalusia	Francisco Muñoz Pérez
Extremadura	1924	Almendralejo, Extremadura	Francisco de la Hera
Granada	1931	Granada, Andalusia	Los Cármenes
Real Jaén	1929	Jaén, Andalusia	La Victoria
Las Palmas	1949	Las Palmas, Canary Islands	Insular
Atlético Malagueño	1948	Málaga, Andalusia	La Rosaleda
Mármol Macael	1952	Macael, Andalusia	Ciudad Deportiva de Macael
Maspalomas	1969	Maspalomas, Canary Islands	Municipal de Maspalomas
Melilla	1976	Melilla	Álvarez Claro
Mensajero	1924	Santa Cruz de La Palma, Canary Islands	Silvestre Carrillo
Realejos	1949	Los Realejos, Canary Islands	Los Príncipes
Recreativo de Huelva	1889	Huelva, Andalusia	Colombino
San Roque de Lepe	1956	Lepe, Andalusia	Municipal de Deportes
Sevilla B	1950	Seville, Andalusia	Viejo Nervión
Xerez	1947	Jerez de la Frontera, Andalusia	Chapín

=== League Table ===
Pos	Team	Pld	W	D	L	GF	GA	GD	Pts	Qualification or relegation
1	Extremadura	38	20	12	6	70	40	+30	52	Qualification for Play-Off
2	Las Palmas	38	20	10	8	66	43	+23	50	Qualification for Play-Off
3	Recreativo	38	19	11	8	57	39	+18	49	Qualification for Play-Off
4	Jaén	38	19	11	8	50	28	+22	49	Qualification for Play-Off
5	Xerez	38	17	15	6	62	40	+22	49	
6	Granada	38	17	12	9	52	37	+15	46	
7	Córdoba	38	16	12	10	65	48	+17	44	
8	Écija	38	12	18	8	34	31	+3	42	
9	Mensajero	38	17	7	14	46	32	+14	41	
10	Realejos	38	14	9	15	60	59	+1	37	
11	Almería	38	13	11	14	48	47	+1	37	
12	Cacereño	38	11	14	13	46	51	−5	36	
13	Mármol Macael	38	12	11	15	35	41	−6	35	
14	Sevilla Atlético	38	11	13	14	43	43	0	35	
15	Melilla	38	9	15	14	28	38	−10	33	
16	San Roque de Lepe	38	11	11	16	33	57	−24	33	Qualification for Play-out
17	Ejido	38	10	11	17	35	43	−8	31	Relegation to 1994–95 Tercera División
18	Atlético Malagueño	38	8	11	19	34	53	−19	27	Relegation to 1994–95 Tercera División
19	Estepona	38	5	8	25	26	70	−44	18	Relegation to 1994–95 Tercera División
20	Maspalomas	38	4	8	26	25	75	−50	16	Relegation to 1994–95 Tercera División

Source: BDFútbol
Rules for classification: 1) points; 2) head-to-head points; 3) head-to-head goal difference; 4) head-to-head goals scored; 5) goal difference; 6) number of goals scored.

=== Results ===
Home \ Away	ALM	CAC	COR	ECI	EJI	EST	EXT	GRA	JAE	LPA	MGA	MAM	MAS	MEL	MEN	REA	REC	SRL	SEV	XER
Almería	—	0–3	4–1	0–1	1–1	3–0	1–0	0–1	2–1	2–1	2–1	2–1	1–0	1–0	3–1	3–3	2–3	4–0	2–2	0–0
Cacereño	2–2	—	0–0	2–3	1–0	1–2	1–2	1–1	2–1	0–3	3–2	1–0	2–0	1–1	0–0	1–0	2–2	1–1	1–0	1–3
Córdoba	2–1	1–1	—	4–2	2–0	1–1	4–3	1–2	1–0	2–2	1–1	3–0	2–0	0–1	1–0	2–2	4–0	4–0	4–2	3–1
Écija	1–0	0–0	0–0	—	1–0	1–0	0–0	1–1	0–0	0–0	1–1	1–0	0–0	3–1	0–0	2–1	2–1	4–0	2–0	1–1
Ejido	1–3	1–1	0–2	1–1	—	3–1	1–3	1–2	1–2	2–0	1–0	1–0	4–0	0–0	1–2	1–1	0–1	3–0	2–1	1–1
Estepona	1–1	1–1	1–6	3–0	0–2	—	1–3	0–0	0–3	1–1	0–1	1–2	1–0	2–2	1–1	4–2	1–0	2–3	1–2	0–1
Extremadura	2–1	0–0	2–0	1–1	2–1	1–0	—	1–0	2–2	5–1	2–1	2–2	4–1	3–2	1–0	2–0	4–0	2–0	2–2	1–4
Granada	0–0	2–0	2–2	1–0	4–1	4–0	3–2	—	2–1	3–2	2–2	2–0	4–1	1–0	0–1	0–5	1–1	2–0	1–1	1–2
Jaén	1–0	2–1	1–0	1–1	0–0	2–0	1–1	1–0	—	1–1	1–1	3–0	2–0	2–0	2–0	3–1	2–1	3–1	1–0	1–3
Las Palmas	2–0	4–2	3–3	2–0	3–1	3–0	0–2	2–3	2–1	—	2–0	1–1	3–2	3–0	2–1	1–0	4–2	2–2	1–0	3–3
Atlético Malagueño	1–2	1–2	2–2	3–1	1–0	1–0	1–1	1–0	0–0	0–2	—	1–1	1–0	1–0	2–1	3–1	0–1	1–1	0–1	0–3
Mármol Macael	1–1	3–2	2–1	0–1	1–0	4–1	0–2	0–0	0–0	0–1	4–1	—	1–0	1–0	0–1	2–0	1–1	1–0	0–0	1–1
Maspalomas	1–1	1–2	1–2	1–1	1–0	0–0	0–4	0–1	0–3	1–2	1–0	0–0	—	1–1	2–1	3–1	2–2	0–1	0–0	2–5
Melilla	1–1	0–0	1–1	0–0	1–1	1–0	1–2	1–3	0–0	0–0	1–0	1–0	1–0	—	1–1	3–2	0–1	1–0	1–0	1–0
Mensajero	4–0	2–1	3–0	1–1	3–0	2–0	2–1	1–0	0–1	1–0	2–0	0–1	3–1	0–0	—	0–0	2–1	6–0	2–0	1–0
Realejos	0–0	3–2	4–1	2–1	1–1	2–0	3–2	0–0	1–0	0–2	5–2	3–1	3–0	0–0	3–0	—	0–2	3–1	1–0	1–2
Recreativo	1–0	2–0	1–0	2–0	0–0	2–0	1–1	2–1	1–0	0–1	4–2	0–0	3–0	1–0	2–1	5–0	—	1–0	2–2	0–0
San Roque de Lepe	2–0	0–1	1–0	0–0	0–1	2–0	0–0	2–1	2–2	0–3	1–0	2–0	3–2	1–0	1–0	3–3	1–1	—	1–1	0–1
Sevilla B	1–0	3–3	0–1	1–0	0–1	4–0	1–1	1–0	1–2	1–0	0–0	0–1	5–0	2–1	1–0	3–1	3–3	1–1	—	1–1
Xerez	3–2	2–1	1–1	0–0	0–0	2–0	1–1	1–1	0–1	1–1	1–0	4–3	5–1	3–3	2–0	1–2	0–4	0–0	3–0	—

Source: BDFútbol
Legend: Blue = home team win; Yellow = draw; Red = away team win.

=== Top goalscorers ===
Goalscorers	Goals	Team
(Spain) José Luis Loreto	24	Córdoba
(Spain) Pepe Mel	20	Granada
(Spain) Manolo Peña	19	Extremadura
(Spain) Toñeca	19	Realejos
(Spain) Melenas	16	Extremadura

=== Top goalkeepers ===
Goalkeeper	Goals	Matches	Average	Team
(Spain) Avelino Viña	28	38	0.74	Jaén
(Spain) Juan Copado	29	36	0.81	Écija
(Spain) José Manuel Santisteban	35	37	0.95	Recreativo
(Spain) Francisco Amador	34	35	0.97	Extremadura
(Spain) Juan Carlos Martínez	37	38	0.97	Granada

== Play-offs ==
=== Group A ===
Pos	Team	Pld	W	D	L	GF	GA	GD	Pts	Promotion	GET	FIG	ALV	REC
1	Getafe CF (P)	6	3	3	0	9	3	+6	9	Promotion to Segunda División		0–0	2–0	1–0
2	UE Figueres	6	1	5	0	2	1	+1	7		0–0		1–1	1–0
3	Alavés	6	1	3	2	4	6	−2	5		1–1	0–0		1–2
4	Recreativo de Huelva	6	1	1	4	4	9	−5	3		2–5	0–0	0–1	

Source: arquero-arba and futbolme
Rules for classification: 1st points; 2nd head-to-head points; 3rd head-to-head goal difference; 4th head-to-head goals scored; 5th goal difference; 6th number of goals scored
(P) Promoted

=== Group B ===
Pos	Team	Pld	W	D	L	GF	GA	GD	Pts	Promotion	SAL	LPA	LEV	BAR
1	UD Salamanca (P)	6	3	2	1	7	5	+2	8	Promotion to Segunda División		2–0	2–2	1–1
2	UD Las Palmas	6	3	1	2	10	6	+4	7		0–1		1–1	6–1
3	Levante UD	6	1	3	2	6	7	−1	5		0–1	0–1		1–1
4	Barakaldo CF	6	1	2	3	7	12	−5	4		2–0	1–2	1–2	

Source: arquero-arba and futbolme
Rules for classification: 1st points; 2nd head-to-head points; 3rd head-to-head goal difference; 4th head-to-head goals scored; 5th goal difference; 6th number of goals scored
(P) Promoted

=== Group C ===
Pos	Team	Pld	W	D	L	GF	GA	GD	Pts	Promotion	ORE	JAE	SES	GRA
1	CD Orense (P)	6	3	2	1	6	5	+1	8	Promotion to Segunda División		0–2	1–0	1–1
2	Real Jaén	6	3	1	2	6	6	0	7		0–0		2–1	2–1
3	Sestao Sport	6	3	0	3	7	6	+1	6		2–3	2–0		1–0
4	UDA Gramenet	6	1	1	4	4	6	−2	3		0–1	2–0	0–1	

Source: arquero-arba and futbolme
Rules for classification: 1st points; 2nd head-to-head points; 3rd head-to-head goal difference; 4th head-to-head goals scored; 5th goal difference; 6th number of goals scored
(P) Promoted

=== Group D ===
Pos	Team	Pld	W	D	L	GF	GA	GD	Pts	Promotion	EXT	MAN	NUM	LNG
1	CF Extremadura (P)	6	3	3	0	11	6	+5	9	Promotion to Segunda División		3–3	1–0	3–0
2	ADC Manlleu	6	2	3	1	8	7	+1	7		1–1		1–1	2–0
3	CD Numancia	6	0	4	2	4	6	−2	4		0–0	0–1		2–2
4	UP Langreo	6	1	2	3	7	11	−4	4		2–3	2–0	1–1	

Source: arquero-arba and futbolme
Rules for classification: 1st points; 2nd head-to-head points; 3rd head-to-head goal difference; 4th head-to-head goals scored; 5th goal difference; 6th number of goals scored
(P) Promoted

== Play-out ==
=== Semifinal ===
Team 1	Score	Team 2
San Roque de Lepe	3–1	Arosa
Valladolid B	1–2 (a.e.t.)	Premià

=== Final ===
Team 1	Score	Team 2
Valladolid B	2–1	Arosa
