= Altolaguirre =

Altolaguirre is a Spanish surname. he surname is associated with a Basque lineage with ancestral houses in Lazcano and Gaviria; members of the lineage later settled in Argentina, and some belonged to the Order of Santiago and the Order of Charles III.. Notable people with the surname include:

- Hernán Altolaguirre (born 1993), Argentine footballer
- Manuel Altolaguirre (1905–1959), Spanish poet, editor, and publisher
- Quintín Altolagirre (1876–1936), Spanish doctor, politician, and sports leader
