= Manu (footballer, born 1973) =

Spanish footballer

Personal information
- Full name: Manuel Francisco Cantero Jerez
- Date of birth: 27 September 1973 (age 53)
- Place of birth: Badajoz, Spain
- Height: 1.85 m (6 ft 1 in)
- Position: Goalkeeper

Senior career*
Years	Team	Apps	(Gls)
1994–1998	Badajoz		
1998–1999	CP Mérida	5	(0)
1999–2001	Ceuta	41	(0)
2001–2002	Burgos	1	(0)
2002–2003	Castellón	2	(0)
2003	Jerez	13	(0)
2004	Yeclano	17	(0)
2004–2006	Mérida UD	6	(0)
2006–2010	Cerro Reyes	49	(0)
2010–2011	Sporting Villanueva		
2011–2012	Jerez	11	(0)
2012–2013	Mérida UD	23	(0)
2013–2015	Mérida AD	63	(0)
2016	Jerez		
- * Club domestic league appearances and goals

Manuel Francisco Cantero Jerez (born 27 September 1973), known as Manu, is a Spanish retired footballer who played as a goalkeeper. He was born in Badajoz, Extremadura.
