= SD Beasain =

Association football club in Spain

Coordinates: 43.046287°N 2.212847°W

Beasain
- Full name: Sociedad Deportiva Beasain
- Founded: 1905; 121 years ago
- Stadium: Loinaz
- Capacity: 6,000
- President: Koldo Zaldua
- Head coach: Mikel Arruabarrena
- League: Tercera Federación – Group 4
- 2025–26: Segunda Federación – Group 2, 14th of 18 (relegated)
- Website: https://beasainke.com/eu/hasiera-2
Home colours	Away colours

Sociedad Deportiva Beasain (Beasain Kirol Elkartea in Basque) is a Spanish football team based in Beasain, in the autonomous community of Basque Country. Founded in 1905 it plays in Tercera Federación – Group 4, holding home games at Estadio Loinaz, with a capacity of 6,000 seats.

== History ==
Founded in 1905 by Quintin Altolagirre, Beasain quickly became one of the main clubs in Goierri, spending 9 seasons in the Tercera Division between 1956 and 1965.

On 13 December 2000, SD Beasain defeated Real Sociedad in the first round of the 2000–01 Copa del Rey the team's greatest achievement.

== Current squad ==
As of 1 March 2026

Note: Flags indicate national team as defined under FIFA eligibility rules; some limited exceptions apply. Players may hold more than one non-FIFA nationality.

No.	Pos.	Nation	Player
1	GK	ESP	Martín Artetxe
2	DF	ESP	Beñat Almandoz
3	DF	ESP	Alex Fernandorena
4	DF	ESP	Aritz Eguren
5	MF	ESP	Julen Zubillaga
6	MF	ESP	Julen Exteberría
7	FW	ESP	Markel Pita
8	MF	ESP	Jon Gaztañaga
9	FW	ESP	Beñat Eizagirre
10	MF	ESP	Eneko Lizaso
11	FW	ESP	Aitor Lorea
12	DF	ESP	Hodei Barbarin

No.	Pos.	Nation	Player
13	GK	ESP	Aritz Urteaga
14	MF	ESP	Beñat González
15	DF	COL	Domenic Torres (on loan from Real Sociedad C)
16	MF	ESP	Ibai Aguirre
17	FW	ESP	Ander Bengoetxea
18	MF	ESP	Cristian Sanz
19	FW	ESP	Eñaut Mendia
20	DF	ESP	Asier Lazcano
21	DF	ESP	Aritz Huete
22	DF	ESP	Asier Sansi
26	MF	ESP	Xabi Monreal
28	FW	ESP	Endika Iriarte

== Season to season ==
Season	Tier	Division	Place	Copa del Rey
1939–40	5	2ª Reg.	1st	
1940–41	4	1ª Reg.	5th	
1941–42	3	1ª Reg.	4th	
1942–43	3	1ª Reg.	2nd	
1943–44	4	1ª Reg.	4th	
1944–45	4	1ª Reg.	2nd	
1945–46	4	1ª Reg.	6th	
1946–47	4	1ª Reg.	3rd	
1947–48	4	1ª Reg.	3rd	
1948–49	4	1ª Reg.	6th	
1949–50	4	1ª Reg.	8th	
1950–51	4	1ª Reg.	10th	
1951–52	4	1ª Reg.	8th	
1952–53	4	1ª Reg.	2nd	
1953–54	4	1ª Reg.	3rd	
1954–55	4	1ª Reg.	8th	
1955–56	4	1ª Reg.	3rd	
1956–57	3	3ª	7th	
1957–58	3	3ª	11th	
1958–59	3	3ª	7th	

Season	Tier	Division	Place	Copa del Rey
1959–60	3	3ª	8th	
1960–61	3	3ª	14th	
1961–62	3	3ª	5th	
1962–63	3	3ª	14th	
1963–64	3	3ª	7th	
1964–65	3	3ª	15th	
1965–66	4	1ª Reg.	1st	
1966–67	4	1ª Reg.	4th	
1967–68	4	1ª Reg.	3rd	
1968–69	4	1ª Reg.	15th	
1969–70	5	2ª Reg.	4th	
1970–71	5	2ª Reg.	2nd	
1971–72	4	1ª Reg.	3rd	
1972–73	5	2ª Reg.	3rd	
1973–74	5	2ª Reg.	10th	
1974–75	5	1ª Reg.	2nd	
1975–76	5	1ª Reg.	2nd	
1976–77	5	1ª Reg.	7th	
1977–78	6	1ª Reg.	7th	
1978–79	6	1ª Reg.	7th	

Season	Tier	Division	Place	Copa del Rey
1979–80	6	1ª Reg.	1st	
1980–81	5	Reg. Pref.	19th	
1981–82	6	1ª Reg.	6th	
1982–83	6	1ª Reg.	9th	
1983–84	6	1ª Reg.	5th	
1984–85	6	1ª Reg.	1st	
1985–86	5	Reg. Pref.	7th	
1986–87	5	Reg. Pref.	13th	
1987–88	5	Reg. Pref.	9th	
1988–89	5	Reg. Pref.	16th	
1989–90	5	Reg. Pref.	2nd	
1990–91	5	Reg. Pref.	1st	
1991–92	4	3ª	2nd	
1992–93	3	2ª B	13th	First round
1993–94	3	2ª B	6th	Second round
1994–95	3	2ª B	4th	Third round
1995–96	3	2ª B	15th	First round
1996–97	3	2ª B	7th	
1997–98	3	2ª B	3rd	
1998–99	3	2ª B	13th	Third round

Season	Tier	Division	Place	Copa del Rey
1999–2000	3	2ª B	6th	
2000–01	3	2ª B	7th	Round of 32
2001–02	3	2ª B	16th	First round
2002–03	4	3ª	6th	
2003–04	4	3ª	6th	
2004–05	4	3ª	6th	
2005–06	4	3ª	14th	
2006–07	4	3ª	4th	
2007–08	4	3ª	14th	
2008–09	4	3ª	5th	
2009–10	4	3ª	6th	
2010–11	4	3ª	5th	
2011–12	4	3ª	4th	
2012–13	4	3ª	10th	
2013–14	4	3ª	10th	
2014–15	4	3ª	5th	
2015–16	4	3ª	5th	
2016–17	4	3ª	4th	
2017–18	4	3ª	5th	
2018–19	4	3ª	13th	

Season	Tier	Division	Place	Copa del Rey
2019–20	4	3ª	14th	
2020–21	4	3ª	6th / 6th	
2021–22	5	3ª RFEF	2nd	
2022–23	4	2ª Fed.	13th	
2023–24	5	3ª Fed.	3rd	
2024–25	5	3ª Fed.	4th	First round
2025–26	4	2ª Fed.	14th	
2026–27	5	3ª Fed.		

- 10 seasons in Segunda División B
- 2 seasons in Segunda Federación
- 29 seasons in Tercera División
- 4 seasons in Tercera División RFEF/Tercera Federación

== Famous managers ==
- (Spain) Perico Alonso
