= José María Cidoncha =

Spanish footballer and manager (born 1970)

Personal information
- Full name: José María Cidoncha Molina
- Date of birth: 19 April 1970 (age 56)
- Place of birth: Badajoz, Spain
- Height: 1.82 m (6 ft 0 in)
- Position: Centre back

Team information
- Current team: Llerenense (manager)

Youth career
- Atlético Madrid

Senior career*
| Years | Team | Apps | (Gls) |
| 1988–1992 | Atlético Madrid B | 104 | (4) |
| 1992–1994 | Badajoz | 62 | (0) |
| 1994–1995 | Valladolid | 23 | (0) |
| 1995–1996 | Almería | 29 | (0) |
| 1996–1997 | Málaga | 28 | (0) |
| 1997–1998 | Jaén | 23 | (0) |
| 1999–2000 | Jerez | 70 | (7) |
| 2000–2001 | Toledo | 36 | (1) |
| 2001–2003 | Badajoz | 75 | (1) |
| 2003–2005 | Jaén | 67 | (8) |
| 2005–2009 | Linares | 139 | (6) |
| Total | | 656 | (27) |

Managerial career
- 2011–2012: PD Jineense (youth)
- 2013–2014: Escañolense
- 2014–2015: Baeza
- 2019–2020: Racing Valverdeño
- 2020–2022: Badajoz (youth)
- 2020: Badajoz (caretaker)
- 2022–2024: Extremadura
- 2025–: Llerenense
- * Club domestic league appearances and goals

José María Cidoncha Molina (born 19 April 1970) is a Spanish football manager and former player who played as a central defender. He is the current manager of AD Llerenense.

== Playing career ==
Born in Badajoz, Extremadura, Cidoncha was an Atlético Madrid youth graduate. He made his debut with the reserves during the 1988–89 season, achieving promotion from Segunda División B.

In 1992, after already becoming a starter, Cidoncha signed for Segunda División side CD Badajoz. In 1994, he moved to La Liga side Real Valladolid, and made his debut in the category on 4 September by starting in a 0–0 away draw against Racing de Santander.

Cidoncha agreed to a contract with second division side UD Almería in 1995, but moved to Málaga CF in the third tier in the following year. He then spent a season at Real Jaén in the second level, before signing for Jerez CF in 1998.

In 2001, after one year at CD Toledo, Cidoncha returned to Badajoz, with the club now in the second division. In 2003, after suffering relegation, he returned to Jaén.

In 2005, Cidoncha joined CD Linares also in the third level. He retired with the club in 2009, after their administrative relegation, at the age of 38.

== Coaching career ==
Immediately after his retirement, Cidoncha joined Deportivo Alavés as a technical secretary. He began his managerial career in 2011, with the Infantil side of PD Jineense, before being named manager of SD Escañolense in July 2013.

In 2014, Cidoncha was named in charge of Segunda Andaluza side Baeza CF. Sacked on 21 April 2015, he returned to Badajoz on 3 June, as a general manager.

On 26 February 2019, Cidoncha was appointed manager of Tercera División side CP Racing Valverdeño, but was sacked the following 22 January. On 1 June 2020, he returned to Badajoz as a part of the scouting area, also being manager of the Cadete A side.

On 15 October 2020, Cidoncha was named manager of the first team after Pedro Munitis was sacked. He returned to his previous role after the appointment of Fernando Estévez, and left the club on 27 April 2022, after one season in charge of the Juvenil squad.

On 3 June 2022, Cidoncha returned to Toledo after being named youth coordinator, but took over newly-formed side CD Extremadura 1924 eighteen days later.
