= Real Ávila CF =

Association football club in Spain

Real Ávila
- Full name: Real Ávila Club de Fútbol, S.A.D.
- Founded: 8 August 1923; 103 years ago
- Ground: Estadio Adolfo Suárez
- Capacity: 6,000
- Owner: Luis Perote
- President: Pedro Pascual
- Head coach: Aitor Martínez
- League: Segunda Federación – Group 1
- 2025–26: Segunda Federación – Group 1, 7th of 18
Home colours	Away colours	Third colours

Real Ávila Club de Fútbol, S.A.D. is a Spanish football team based in Ávila, in the autonomous community of Castile and León. Founded in 1923, it currently plays in Segunda Federación – Group 1, holding home games at Estadio Adolfo Suárez, with a capacity of 6,000 seats.

== History ==
=== Early history (1923–1936) ===
The first football team in Ávila was the Ávila Football Club, founded on 8 August 1923 with the formation of its first board of directors, which elected Pedro Gutiérrez as president. The club adopted red shirts, blue shorts, and black socks with red turnovers as its team colours. In 1924, Jerónimo Tomé Bustillo became the new president, and in May the team inaugurated its first ground, San Francisco, located on rented land in Calleja del Moro (now Virgen de la Soterraña).

One of the most notable matches of this early period was a friendly against Real Madrid, played on 18 October during the festivities of La Santa. On 17 June 1925, the club received a royal order from King Alfonso XIII authorising His Royal Highness the Prince of Asturias to accept the honorary presidency of the club. Later that year, the King granted the club the title "Real", and it became Real Ávila Football Club, a name first used officially on 30 August 1925.

From its founding, the club played friendly matches and took part in regional tournaments. In 1936, the outbreak of the Spanish Civil War brought all sporting activity to a halt. The Calleja del Moro ground disappeared, and with it, the team and its supporters. After the war, a new generation of football fans began to re-emerge, and the El Pradillo ground marked the rebirth of football in Ávila.

=== Modern history (1943–1987) ===
The current Real Ávila Club de Fútbol was founded on 6 August 1943. In November of the same year, the main issue of securing a football ground was resolved. Thanks to the efforts of the civil governor, Alejandro López Baños, and the mayor, José Tomé Bustillo, the City Council ceded the Campo de los Hoyos, located in San Antonio Park, for the construction of a sports ground later known as Campo de San Antonio. The land covered 12,000 square meters and was located in a central and scenic area. According to official documents, the site could not be removed without being replaced by another of equal or better quality, as it was considered vital for the future of local sports.

In January 1944, work began on the Campo de San Antonio. That same month, following the resignation of president Martínez Piqueras, a new board of directors was formed. The team registered with the Royal Spanish Football Federation and was placed in the Tercera División, Group VI, alongside clubs such as Real Valladolid, Deportiva Fábrica de Armas de Palencia, Gimnástica Burgalesa, Gimnástica Ferroviaria de Madrid, Imperio CF de Madrid, Gimnástica Segoviana, UD Salamanca, Atlético Zamora, and UD Béjar.

Although the official inauguration was reserved for the Santa Teresa festivities, the first match at Campo de San Antonio was played on 10 September 1944 before a large crowd. Over the following decades, Real Ávila moved through the Segunda Regional, Primera Regional, Regional Preferente, and, under coach José María Martínez and president Antonio Álvarez, eventually returned to the Tercera División.

One of the most challenging periods in the club's history involved frequent changes of playing grounds. Before settling at Campo de San Antonio, the club had played at El Pradillo, Campo del Habanero, and Huerta or Prado "Calleja del Moro". After leaving San Antonio, the club was temporarily exiled to the city's sports complex. Since 1976, Real Ávila has played its home matches at the Adolfo Suárez Municipal Stadium, inaugurated by the then Prime Minister Adolfo Suárez, who performed the ceremonial kickoff in a match between Real Ávila and Manzanares.

In the 1986–87 season, Real Ávila was moved to the Castilla y León Football Federation group in Tercera División. On 10 May 1987, the team secured promotion to Segunda División B after a match in Herrera de Pisuerga (Palencia), under the management of José Antonio Tejedor and the presidency of Emiliano Arévalo.

=== Promotion to Segunda División B (1987–1995) ===
With the 1987 promotion, Real Ávila achieved the greatest sporting success in its history, reaching Segunda División B. The club remained in this division for eight consecutive seasons until 1995, when it was relegated back to Tercera División. At that time, the club was chaired by Anastasio Martín del Río and coached by Antonio Minguella. Four seasons later, the team earned promotion again to Segunda División B, only to be relegated once more two years later. In 1998, the club revived its official anthem, which was performed by the Ávila municipal band prior to a friendly match against La Liga side UD Salamanca, held on 11 October. Real Ávila won the match 1–0.

=== Recent history (21st century) ===
In the 2001–02 season, under local manager Miguel Martín del Río, Real Ávila won Group VIII of Tercera División and secured promotion, although the team was relegated again the following season. In the 2003–04 campaign, the club qualified for the promotion playoffs to Segunda División B, where it was eliminated by Real Oviedo.

In the 2015–16 season, after being relegated to the Regional Preferente, the club returned to Group VIII of Tercera División for the 2016–17 season.

In March 2020, the 2019–20 season was suspended due to the COVID-19 pandemic. On 6 May, the Royal Spanish Football Federation (RFEF) approved measures to conclude the regular season, including confirmation of the current league standings, holding promotion playoffs in a shortened format, and cancelling relegations.

On 14 September 2020, the RFEF approved a restructuring of its national divisions, renaming them Primera RFEF, Segunda RFEF, and Tercera RFEF. Real Ávila was placed in the newly designated Tercera RFEF.

In the 2023–24 season, under the management of Miguel de la Fuente, Real Ávila won Group VIII of the Tercera Federación and achieved promotion to Segunda RFEF.

== Season to season ==
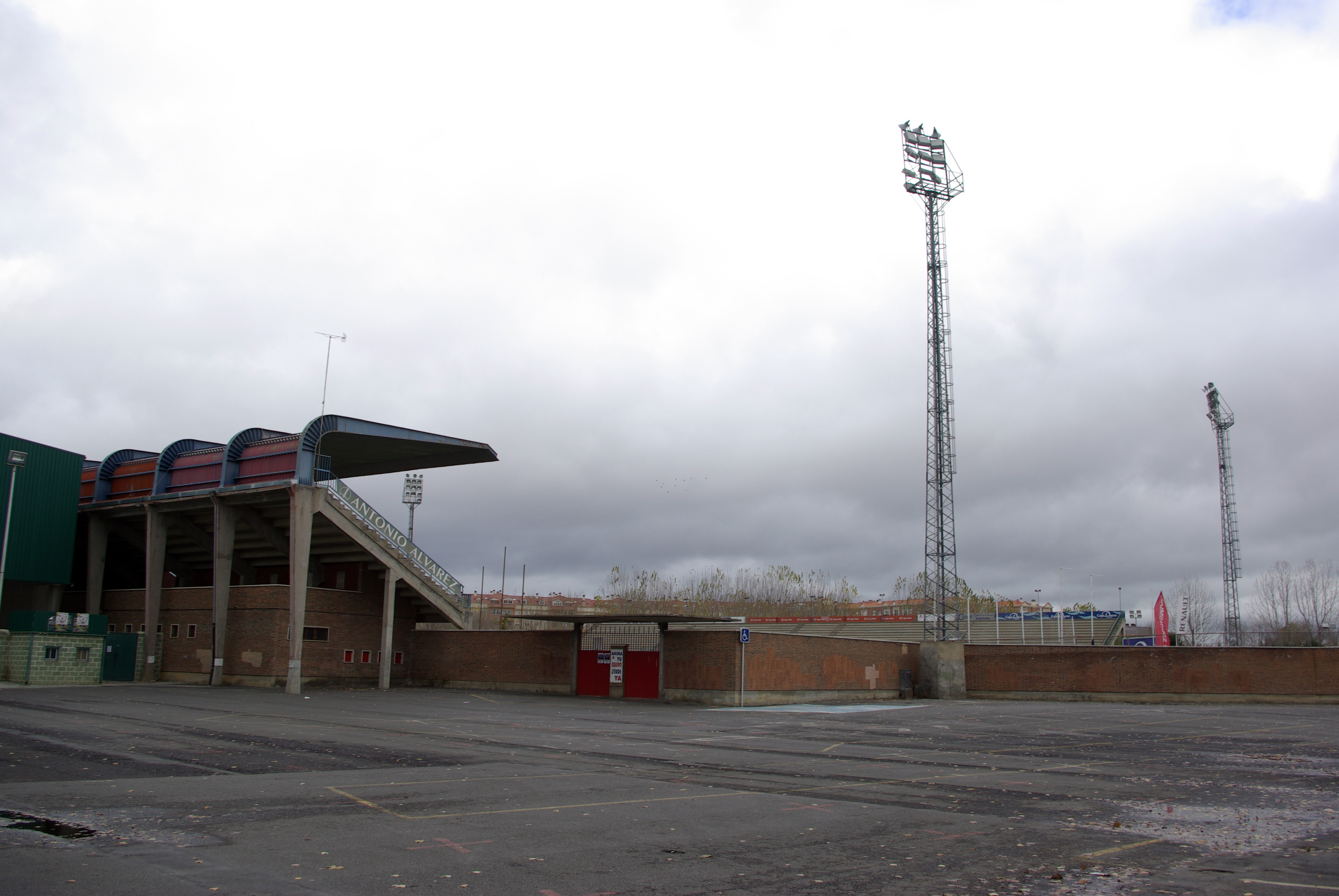
Estadio Adolfo Suárez.

Season	Tier	Division	Place	Copa del Rey
1944–45	3	3ª	10th	
1945–46	3	3ª	6th	
1946–47	3	3ª	5th	
1947–48	3	3ª	11th	Fourth round
1948–49	3	3ª	11th	Second round
1949–50	3	3ª	5th	
1950–51	3	3ª	6th	
1951–52	3	3ª	16th	
1952–53	4	1ª Reg.	5th	
1953–54	4	1ª Reg.	11th	
1954–55	3	3ª	9th	
1955–56	3	3ª	10th	
1956–57	3	3ª	12th	
1957–58	3	3ª	19th	
1958–59	4	1ª Reg.	14th	
1959–60	5	2ª Reg.	2nd	
1960–61	4	1ª Reg.	6th	
1961–62	4	1ª Reg.	4th	
1962–63	4	1ª Reg.	3rd	
1963–64	3	3ª	7th	

Season	Tier	Division	Place	Copa del Rey
1964–65	3	3ª	7th	
1965–66	3	3ª	12th	
1966–67	3	3ª	14th	
1967–68	3	3ª	13th	
1968–69	4	1ª Reg.	6th	
1969–70	4	1ª Reg.	3rd	
1970–71	4	1ª Reg.	5th	
1971–72	4	1ª Reg.	7th	
1972–73	4	1ª Reg.	10th	
1973–74	4	Reg. Pref.	10th	
1974–75	5	1ª Reg.	4th	
1975–76	4	Reg. Pref.	11th	
1976–77	5	1ª Reg.	4th	
1977–78	5	Reg. Pref.	16th	
1978–79	6	1ª Reg.	4th	
1979–80	6	1ª Reg.	1st	
1980–81	5	Reg. Pref.	1st	
1981–82	4	3ª	8th	
1982–83	4	3ª	6th	
1983–84	4	3ª	6th	First round

Season	Tier	Division	Place	Copa del Rey
1984–85	4	3ª	5th	First round
1985–86	4	3ª	8th	First round
1986–87	4	3ª	3rd	
1987–88	3	2ª B	8th	First round
1988–89	3	2ª B	12th	Third round
1989–90	3	2ª B	8th	
1990–91	3	2ª B	11th	Fourth round
1991–92	3	2ª B	13th	Third round
1992–93	3	2ª B	11th	First round
1993–94	3	2ª B	9th	Second round
1994–95	3	2ª B	18th	First round
1995–96	4	3ª	5th	
1996–97	4	3ª	12th	
1997–98	4	3ª	6th	
1998–99	4	3ª	4th	
1999–2000	3	2ª B	11th	Preliminary
2000–01	3	2ª B	19th	
2001–02	4	3ª	1st	
2002–03	3	2ª B	19th	Preliminary
2003–04	4	3ª	4th	

Season	Tier	Division	Place	Copa del Rey
2004–05	4	3ª	2nd	
2005–06	4	3ª	7th	
2006–07	4	3ª	4th	
2007–08	4	3ª	3rd	
2008–09	4	3ª	4th	
2009–10	4	3ª	4th	
2010–11	4	3ª	7th	
2011–12	4	3ª	2nd	
2012–13	4	3ª	10th	First round
2013–14	4	3ª	4th	
2014–15	4	3ª	19th	
2015–16	5	1ª Reg.	1st	
2016–17	4	3ª	7th	
2017–18	4	3ª	10th	
2018–19	4	3ª	6th	
2019–20	4	3ª	8th	
2020–21	4	3ª	6th / 3rd	
2021–22	5	3ª RFEF	3rd	
2022–23	5	3ª Fed.	4th	
2023–24	5	3ª Fed.	1st	

Season	Tier	Division	Place	Copa del Rey
2024–25	4	2ª Fed.	5th	Second round
2025–26	4	2ª Fed.	7th	Second round
2026–27	4	2ª Fed.		TBD

- 11 seasons in Segunda División B
- 3 seasons in Segunda Federación
- 45 seasons in Tercera División
- 3 seasons in Tercera Federación/Tercera División RFEF

== Current squad ==
Updated as of 5 February 2026 Note: Flags indicate national team as defined under FIFA eligibility rules; some limited exceptions apply. Players may hold more than one non-FIFA nationality.

No.	Pos.	Nation	Player
1	GK	ESP	Óscar López
3	DF	GEQ	Prince Ngaah
4	DF	ESP	Jesús del Amo
5	DF	ESP	Carlos Pascual
6	MF	ESP	Vitolo
7	FW	ESP	Runy
8	MF	POR	Filipe Sissé
9	FW	ESP	Diego Lorenzo
10	FW	ESP	Adri Carrión
11	FW	ESP	Luis Ángel Forcén
12	MF	ESP	Carlos Pérez
13	GK	VEN	Samuel Rodriguez

No.	Pos.	Nation	Player
14	MF	ESP	Diego López
16	MF	ESP	Markel Ruiz
17	FW	ESP	Marquitos
18	FW	ESP	Dani Sánchez
19	FW	ESP	Gonzalo Serrano
20	MF	ESP	Javi Grillo
21	MF	ESP	Álex Moreno
22	FW	ESP	Fer Díaz
23	DF	ESP	Gerard Urbina (on loan from CE Europa)
29	DF	SEN	Babacar Fall
30	MF	SEN	Mamadou Sarr

== Famous players ==
- (Dominican Republic) Rony Beard
- (Dominican Republic) Benji Núñez
- (Equatorial Guinea) Rui
- (Netherlands) Martin Wolfswinkel
- (Portugal) Bruno Tiago
- (Spain) Ricardo
- (Spain) Feliciano Rivilla
- (Spain) Juan Viyuela
- (Spain) Jose "Chino" Zapatera
- (Spain) Rubén Peña
