= Bruno Tiago (footballer, born 1981) =

Portuguese footballer

Personal information
- Full name: Bruno Tiago Fernandes Andrade
- Date of birth: 1 April 1981 (age 45)
- Place of birth: Santo Tirso, Portugal
- Height: 1.80 m (5 ft 11 in)
- Position: Midfielder

Youth career
- 1991–1996: Tirsense
- 1996–2000: Vitória Guimarães

Senior career*
Years	Team	Apps	(Gls)
2000–2002	Salamanca	4	(0)
2000–2001	→ Ávila (loan)	17	(2)
2003–2004	Dragões Sandinenses	50	(5)
2004–2007	Gil Vicente	71	(2)
2007–2009	Braga	0	(0)
Total		142	(9)

International career
1999	Portugal U17	2	(0)
1999	Portugal U18	4	(0)
2001–2002	Portugal U20	5	(0)
- * Club domestic league appearances and goals

Bruno Tiago Fernandes Andrade (born 1 April 1981), known as Bruno Tiago, is a Portuguese former professional footballer who played as a midfielder.

Following two seasons in the Primeira Liga with Gil Vicente and unassuming experiences in Spain, he retired still in his 20s due to injury.

== Club career ==
Bruno Tiago was born in Santo Tirso, Porto District. Having grown through the ranks of Minho's Vitória de Guimarães, he moved to Spain in 2000–01, joining Segunda División club UD Salamanca where he would remain two and a half seasons (with a loan to lowly Real Ávila CF in between), without any impact.

Bruno Tiago returned to Portugal in January 2003 where, after a stint with S.C. Dragões Sandinenses, he signed a three-year contract with Gil Vicente F.C. for the 2004–05 campaign. He made his Primeira Liga debut on 28 August 2004 in a 3–2 away loss against Sporting CP, and finished his first year with 25 league appearances.

In June 2007, Bruno Tiago joined Vitória's neighbours S.C. Braga. He broke his leg one week into pre-season, being ruled out for the season's duration; following two years on the sidelines, he was forced to retire from the game at only 28.

== International career ==
Bruno Tiago appeared in two editions of the Toulon Tournament with the Portugal under-20 team, winning the 2001 edition.
