= 2001 Segunda División B play-offs =

Spanish football league play-offs

The 2001 Segunda División B play-offs (Playoffs de Ascenso or Promoción de Ascenso) were the final playoffs for promotion from 2000–01 Segunda División B to the 2001–02 Segunda División. The four first placed teams in each of the four Segunda División B groups played the Playoffs de Ascenso and the four last placed teams in Segunda División were relegated to Segunda División B.

The teams play a league of four teams, divided into 4 groups. The champion of each group is promoted to Segunda División.

== Group A ==
=== League table ===
Pos	Team	Pld	W	D	L	GF	GA	GD	Pts	Promotion or relegation
1	Burgos CF (P)	6	5	1	0	7	1	+6	16	Promotion to Segunda División
2	AD Ceuta	6	3	1	2	9	4	+5	10	
3	CE Sabadell	6	2	0	4	6	11	−5	6	
4	CD Ourense	6	1	0	5	4	10	−6	3	

Source: arquero-arba
Rules for classification: 1st points; 2nd head-to-head points; 3rd head-to-head goal difference; 4th head-to-head goals scored; 5th goal difference; 6th number of goals scored
(P) Promoted

=== Results ===
Home \ Away	BUR	CEU	SAB	OUR
Burgos CF		0–0	3–1	1–0
AD Ceuta	0–1		0–1	2–1
CE Sabadell	0–1	0–3		1–0
CD Ourense	1–2	0–3	3–2	

Source: arquero-arba
Legend: Blue = home team win; Yellow = draw; Red = away team win.

== Group B ==
=== League table ===
Pos	Team	Pld	W	D	L	GF	GA	GD	Pts	Promotion or relegation
1	Polideportivo Ejido (P)	6	3	1	2	10	4	+6	10	Promotion to Segunda División
2	Atlético de Madrid B	6	3	1	2	5	8	−3	10	
3	CD Calahorra	6	3	1	2	7	6	+1	10	
4	RCD Espanyol B	6	1	1	4	4	8	−4	4	

Source: arquero-arba
Rules for classification: 1st points; 2nd head-to-head points; 3rd head-to-head goal difference; 4th head-to-head goals scored; 5th goal difference; 6th number of goals scored
(P) Promoted

=== Results ===
Home \ Away	PEJ	AtmB	CAL	ESP
Polideportivo Ejido		4–0	1–1	3–0
Atlético de Madrid B	1–0		0–2	1–0
CD Calahorra	0–2	1–2		2–1
RCD Espanyol B	2–0	1–1	0–1	

Source: arquero-arba
Legend: Blue = home team win; Yellow = draw; Red = away team win.

== Group C ==
=== League table ===
Pos	Team	Pld	W	D	L	GF	GA	GD	Pts	Promotion or relegation
1	Gimnàstic de Tarragona (P)	6	3	2	1	8	4	+4	11	Promotion to Segunda División
2	Cádiz CF	6	3	2	1	8	6	+2	11	
3	Amurrio Club	6	1	3	2	5	6	−1	6	
4	Zamora	6	0	3	3	2	7	−5	3	

Source: arquero-arba
Rules for classification: 1st points; 2nd head-to-head points; 3rd head-to-head goal difference; 4th head-to-head goals scored; 5th goal difference; 6th number of goals scored
(P) Promoted

=== Results ===
Home \ Away	GTA	CAD	AMU	ZAM
Gimnàstic de Tarragona		3–1	4–2	0–0
Cádiz CF	1–0		2–1	2–2
Amurrio Club	0–0	0–0		0–0
Zamora	0–1	0–2	0–2	

Source: arquero-arba
Legend: Blue = home team win; Yellow = draw; Red = away team win.

== Group D ==
=== League table ===
Pos	Team	Pld	W	D	L	GF	GA	GD	Pts	Promotion or relegation
1	Xerez CD (P)	6	4	1	1	11	4	+7	13	Promotion to Segunda División
2	Cultural Leonesa	6	4	0	2	8	3	+5	12	
3	CD Toledo	6	2	2	2	6	10	−4	8	
4	UDA Gramenet	6	0	1	5	3	11	−8	1	

Source: arquero-arba
Rules for classification: 1st points; 2nd head-to-head points; 3rd head-to-head goal difference; 4th head-to-head goals scored; 5th goal difference; 6th number of goals scored
(P) Promoted

=== Results ===
Home \ Away	XER	CLE	TOL	GRA
Xerez CD		2–0	2–0	3–0
Cultural Leonesa	1–0		0–1	2–0
CD Toledo	2–2	0–4		2–1
UDA Gramenet	1–2	0–1	1–1	

Source: arquero-arba
Legend: Blue = home team win; Yellow = draw; Red = away team win.
