= Mármol Macael CD =

Mármol Macael
- Full name: Mármol Macael Club Deportivo
- Founded: 1952
- Dissolved: 2011
- Ground: Ciudad Deportiva de Macael, Macael, Andalusia, Spain
- Capacity: 9,000
Home colours

Mármol Macael Club Deportivo was a Spanish football team based in Macael, Almería, in the autonomous community of Andalusia. Founded in 1952 under the name of Atlético Macael CF, it was dissolved in 2011.

== Season to season ==
Season	Tier	Division	Place	Copa del Rey
1952–1968	—	Regional	—	
1968–69	4	1ª Reg.	2nd	
1969–70	4	1ª Reg.	12th	
1970–71	4	1ª Reg.	4th	
1971–72	4	1ª Reg.	13th	
1972–73	4	1ª Reg.	11th	
1973–74	4	1ª Reg.	18th	
1974–75	4	1ª Reg.	16th	
1975–76	5	1ª Reg.	8th	
1976–77	5	1ª Reg.	11th	
1977–78	6	1ª Reg.	11th	
1978–79	6	1ª Reg.	13th	
1979–80	6	1ª Reg.	12th	
1980–81	5	Reg. Pref.	11th	
1981–82	5	Reg. Pref.	1st	
1982–83	4	3ª	6th	
1983–84	4	3ª	15th	First round
1984–85	4	3ª	10th	
1985–86	4	3ª	16th	
1986–87	4	3ª	20th	

Season	Tier	Division	Place	Copa del Rey
1987–88	4	3ª	8th	
1988–89	4	3ª	13th	
1989–90	4	3ª	6th	
1990–91	4	3ª	3rd	First round
1991–92	4	3ª	2nd	First round
1992–93	4	3ª	4th	First round
1993–94	3	2ª B	13th	Third round
1994–95	3	2ª B	8th	Second round
1995–96	3	2ª B	17th	
1996–97	4	3ª	15th	
1997–98	4	3ª	8th	
1998–99	4	3ª	18th	
1999–2000	5	Reg. Pref.	1st	
2000–01	4	3ª	9th	
2001–02	4	3ª	4th	
2002–03	4	3ª	20th	
2003–04	5	Reg. Pref.	4th	
2004–05	5	1ª And.	3rd	
2005–06	5	1ª And.	14th	
2006–07	6	Reg. Pref.	12th	

- 3 seasons in Segunda División B
- 17 seasons in Tercera División
