= Quintín Altolagirre =

Spanish doctor, politician, and sports leader

Quintin Altolagirre
- Born: Quintín Altolagirre Zabala; 6 June 1876; Gipuzkoa, Spain
- Died: 28 October 1936 (aged 60); Madrid, Spain
- Citizenship: Spanish
- Occupations: Doctor: Politician; Sports leader
- Known for: 1st President of SD Beasain
- Political party: Patriotic Union

1st President of SD Beasain
- In office 1904–unknown

Vice president of the Provincial Council of Gipuzkoa
- In office 1936–1936

Quintín Altolagirre Zabala (6 June 1876 – 28 October 1936) was a Spanish doctor, politician, and sports leader, who was the founding president of SD Beasain in 1904. Politically, he was vice president of the provincial commission of Gipuzkoa, from where he was a strong defender of the Basque Economic Agreement.

== Early life and education ==
Born in Gipuzkoa on 6 June 1876, Altolagirre began his medical studies at the University of Zaragoza in 1903, and then continued at the Complutense University of Madrid, where in 1904, he presented his doctoral thesis titled Tic de Salaam.

== Medical career ==
Altolagirre specialized in gynecology and obstetrics, which allowed him to work as a registered physician in Beasain, and when the Board of Registered Physicians of Gipuzkoa was formed in 1903, he was appointed as its first president. In 1921, together with doctors Luis Ayestarán, Luis Olalde, and Florencio Mozo, he was a founder and member of the first management team of the Hospital of Our Lady of Arantzazu in San Sebastián.

He sometimes traveled abroad, such as to Argentina.

== Sporting career ==
In 1904, the 28-year-old Altolagirre was the founding president of the Sociedad Recreativa Casino de Beasain, which later became SD Beasain, a society that held several recreational, cultural, and leisure activities, including theatre, town festivals, and to football (since 1909), which had many followers among the local youth.

== Political career ==
Politically active, Altolagirre was a member of Miguel Primo de Rivera's Patriotic Union, and from 1925 onwards, he was appointed vice-president of the party's San Sebastián delegation, provincial deputy of Gipuzkoa, councilor of the San Sebastián City Council, holding the latter position for five years, from 1925 until 1930. In 1931, he was appointed as the manager of the Provincial Council of Gipuzkoa, a position that he held for five years, until he died on 28 October 1936, the year in which he was unanimously named as its vice-president. In this capacity, he was a strong defender of the Basque Economic Agreement.

== Works ==
- Tic de Salaam (Tolosa, 1910)
- El Concierto Económico visto desde mi escaño de diputado (Beasain, 1930)
