= Touring KE =

Touring
- Full name: Touring Kirol Elkartea
- Nickname: Galleteros
- Founded: 22 June 1923; 103 years ago
- Ground: Fandería, Errenteria, Basque Country, Spain
- Capacity: 1,000
- Chairman: Pako Arrillaga
- Manager: Jon Ayestaran
- League: Tercera Federación – Group 4
- 2025–26: Tercera Federación – Group 4, 5th of 18
Home colours	Away colours

Touring Kirol Elkartea is a Spanish football team based in Errenteria, in the autonomous community of Basque Country. Founded in 1923, it plays in Tercera Federación – Group 4, holding home matches at Campo de Fútbol de Fandería.

The club was founded under the name of Club Deportivo Touring, changing to its current name in 2012.

== Season to season ==
Season	Tier	Division	Place	Copa del Rey
1945–46	4	1ª Reg.	5th	
1946–47	4	1ª Reg.	2nd	
1947–48	4	1ª Reg.	1st	
1948–49	4	1ª Reg.	3rd	
1949–50	4	1ª Reg.	11th	
1950–51	4	1ª Reg.	4th	
1951–52	4	1ª Reg.	10th	
1952–53	4	1ª Reg.	8th	
1953–54	4	1ª Reg.	10th	
1954–55	4	1ª Reg.	1st	
1955–56	3	3ª	6th	
1956–57	3	3ª	5th	
1957–58	3	3ª	16th	
1958–59	4	1ª Reg.	4th	
1959–60	4	1ª Reg.	1st	
1960–61	3	3ª	4th	
1961–62	3	3ª	12th	
1962–63	3	3ª	8th	
1963–64	3	3ª	8th	
1964–65	3	3ª	7th	

Season	Tier	Division	Place	Copa del Rey
1965–66	3	3ª	10th	
1966–67	3	3ª	13th	
1967–68	3	3ª	16th	
1968–69	4	1ª Reg.	2nd	
1969–70	4	1ª Reg.	12th	
1970–71	4	1ª Reg.	11th	
1971–72	4	1ª Reg.	2nd	
1972–73	4	1ª Reg.	5th	
1973–74	4	1ª Reg.	8th	
1974–75	4	Reg. Pref.	5th	
1975–76	4	Reg. Pref.	2nd	
1976–77	3	3ª	20th	First round
1977–78	5	Reg. Pref.	12th	
1978–79	5	Reg. Pref.	6th	
1979–80	5	Reg. Pref.	2nd	
1980–81	5	Reg. Pref.	1st	
1981–82	4	3ª	15th	
1982–83	4	3ª	9th	
1983–84	4	3ª	20th	
1984–85	5	Reg. Pref.	9th	

Season	Tier	Division	Place	Copa del Rey
1985–86	5	Reg. Pref.	5th	
1986–87	5	Reg. Pref.	3rd	
1987–88	4	3ª	17th	
1988–89	4	3ª	3rd	
1989–90	4	3ª	10th	
1990–91	4	3ª	18th	
1991–92	5	Reg. Pref.	1st	
1992–93	4	3ª	4th	
1993–94	3	2ª B	20th	
1994–95	4	3ª	17th	
1995–96	4	3ª	8th	
1996–97	4	3ª	1st	
1997–98	4	3ª	11th	
1998–99	4	3ª	18th	
1999–2000	5	Reg. Pref.	17th	
2000–01	6	1ª Reg.	4th	
2001–02	6	1ª Reg.	1st	
2002–03	5	Reg. Pref.	16th	
2003–04	5	Reg. Pref.	13th	
2004–05	5	Reg. Pref.	11th	

Season	Tier	Division	Place	Copa del Rey
2005–06	5	Reg. Pref.	7th	
2006–07	5	Reg. Pref.	10th	
2007–08	5	Reg. Pref.	18th	
2008–09	6	1ª Reg.	13th	
2009–10	6	Pref.	11th	
2010–11	6	Pref.	4th	
2011–12	6	Pref.	1st	
2012–13	5	Div. Hon.	14th	
2013–14	5	Div. Hon.	11th	
2014–15	5	Div. Hon.	6th	
2015–16	5	Div. Hon.	8th	
2016–17	5	Div. Hon.	14th	
2017–18	5	Div. Hon.	18th	
2018–19	6	Pref.	2nd	
2019–20	5	Div. Hon.	12th	
2020–21	5	Div. Hon.	5th	
2021–22	6	Div. Hon.	1st	
2022–23	5	3ª Fed.	14th	
2023–24	5	3ª Fed.	13th	
2024–25	5	3ª Fed.	7th	

Season	Tier	Division	Place	Copa del Rey
2025–26	5	3ª Fed.	5th	
2026–27	5	3ª Fed.		

- 1 season in Segunda División B
- 25 seasons in Tercera División
- 5 seasons in Tercera Federación
