= José Manuel Santisteban =

Spanish footballer

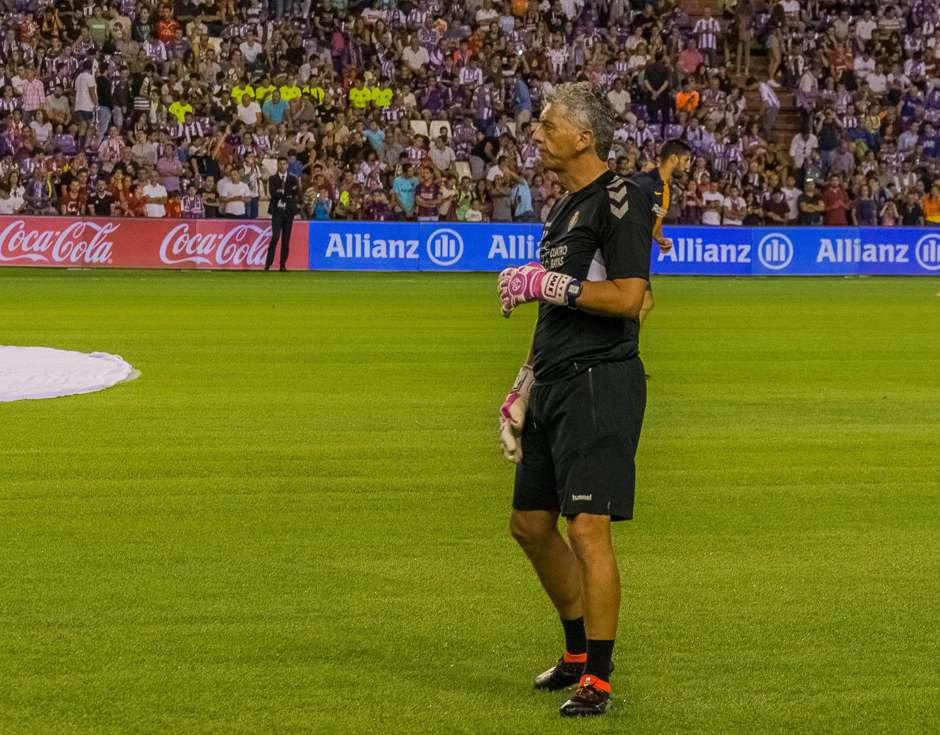
- 2018

Personal information
- Full name: José Manuel Santisteban González
- Date of birth: 27 September 1967 (age 59)
- Place of birth: Barakaldo, Spain
- Height: 1.83 m (6 ft 0 in)
- Position: Goalkeeper

Team information
- Current team: Almería (goalkeeping coach)

Youth career
- Athletic Bilbao

Senior career*
Years	Team	Apps	(Gls)
1985–1990	Bilbao Athletic	0	(0)
1986–1987	→ Amorebieta (loan)		
1988–1989	→ Laredo (loan)		
1989–1990	Sanluqueño	28	(0)
1990–1993	Xerez	62	(0)
1993–1995	Recreativo	45	(0)
1994–1995	Baracaldo	23	(0)
1994–1995	Logroñés	19	(0)
1996–1997	Recreativo	4	(0)
1998–1999	Poli Almería	8	(0)
1999–2000	Mensajero	35	(0)
2000–2002	Ourense	68	(0)
2002–2003	Burgos	30	(0)
- * Club domestic league appearances and goals

José Manuel Santisteban González (born 27 September 1967), is a Spanish professional football coach and former player who played as a goalkeeper. He is the current goalkeeping coach of UD Almería.

== Playing career ==
He started his professional football career in Bilbao Athletic as a goalkeeper and played for second and third divisions in spain.

== Coaching career ==
After retirement from playing career he worked as goalkeeping coach.
