= Jerez CF =

Spanish association football club

Jerez
- Full name: Jerez Club de Fútbol
- Founded: 1969
- Ground: Manuel Calzado Galván, Jerez de los Caballeros, Badajoz; Extremadura, Spain
- Capacity: 5,000
- President: Manuel Sanchez De San Vicente
- Head coach: Javi Ortega
- League: Tercera Federación – Group 14
- 2025–26: Tercera Federación – Group 14, 10th of 18
Home colours	Away colours

Jerez Club de Fútbol is a Spanish football team based in Jerez de los Caballeros, in the autonomous community of Extremadura. Founded in 1969, it plays in Tercera Federación – Group 14.

== History ==
Jerez Club de Fútbol was formed in 1969, in the small historic town of Jerez de los Caballeros. The early years were spent in the regional leagues of Extremadura, the club's first venture into the Tercera División coming in the season 1984–85, which was however short-lived (immediate relegation).

The team returned a year later, and slowly began to improve performances, to the extent that by 1992–93 they reached the play-offs for third level for the first time. Promotion via this way was to prove a tortuous affair however, with regular high finishes in the regular season amounting to nothing in the knockout stages: the first disappointment occurred in 1992–93 when, after finishing the season third, they lost 1–3 on aggregate to Atlético Malagueño.

Jerez won its first Tercera title in 1993–94, but only won two of six matches in the playoffs. The following season brought a second place behind Don Benito, and the playoffs elimination at the hands of reborn Málaga – the team finished third, behind Isla Cristina and above Puertollano.

In 1995–96, Jerez finished second behind Cacereño, recording impressive wins over Guarena (10–0, home) and at Sanvicenteño (11–0, away); both clubs scored more than 120 goals during the campaign. In the playoffs, there was more of the same, with the club ranking third, with Guadix eventually being promoted. The following year brought its second fourth division title, but another playoff elimination, against Andalusia's Isla Cristina.

After five successive failures in the play-offs, Jerez finally won promotion to the third category in 1998 (after renewing its regular season supremacy), after a 0–0 draw against Vélez. The 1998–99 season was the first of seven consecutive seasons in the third division. Jerez finished 12th, after notable wins against Granada (4–0), Sevilla B (5–0) and Real Jaén (1–2), for a total of 54 points (44 in the following, and four consecutive top ten finishes afterwards).

In 2000–01, the competition was reduced to 36 games, following Polideportivo Almería's disbanding, and Jerez finished ninth, with 47 points; the season's highest point was a 4–2 triumph at eventual champions Cádiz (the club also obtained the same position in 2002–03).

The 2003–04 season was Jerez's most successful in terms of points, and although the club finally ranked eighth, it battled for a play-off berth until the final few weeks of the season, and only conceded 29 league goals, second-best in its group, but lost valuable points in October/November 2003, with five consecutive draws.

The club's run in the third level came to an end in the following season, which was almost entirely spent in the relegation zone, with Jerez failing to win any of its last six matches. In 2007 and 2008, it returned to the promotion play-offs, being defeated respectively by Gavà (2–4 aggregate) and Ciempozuelos (1–5). The club finished sixth in the 2018–19 season in Tercera División, Group 14.

=== Club naming ===
- Club Polideportivo Vasco Núñez – 1971–1990
- Club Polideportivo Cristian Lay – 1990–1994
- Jerez Club de Fútbol – 1994–present

== Season to season ==
Season	Tier	Division	Place	Copa del Rey
1971–72	5	2ª Reg.	11th	
1972–73	5	2ª Reg.	7th	
1973–74	5	2ª Reg.	2nd	
1974–75	5	1ª Reg.	6th	
1975–76	5	1ª Reg.	1st	
1976–77	4	Reg. Pref.	11th	
1977–78	5	Reg. Pref.	3rd	
1978–79	5	Reg. Pref.	18th	
1979–80	5	Reg. Pref.	18th	
1980–81	6	1ª Reg.	1st	
1981–82	5	Reg. Pref.	9th	
1982–83	5	Reg. Pref.	13th	
1983–84	5	Reg. Pref.	1st	
1984–85	4	3ª	20th	
1985–86	5	Reg. Pref.	1st	
1986–87	4	3ª	11th	
1987–88	4	3ª	7th	
1988–89	4	3ª	5th	
1989–90	4	3ª	9th	
1990–91	4	3ª	5th	

Season	Tier	Division	Place	Copa del Rey
1991–92	4	3ª	5th	
1992–93	4	3ª	3rd	
1993–94	4	3ª	1st	
1994–95	4	3ª	2nd	
1995–96	4	3ª	2nd	
1996–97	4	3ª	1st	
1997–98	4	3ª	1st	
1998–99	3	2ª B	12th	Third round
1999–2000	3	2ª B	13th	
2000–01	3	2ª B	9th	
2001–02	3	2ª B	6th	
2002–03	3	2ª B	9th	Second round
2003–04	3	2ª B	8th	
2004–05	3	2ª B	19th	
2005–06	4	3ª	6th	
2006–07	4	3ª	1st	
2007–08	4	3ª	4th	First round
2008–09	4	3ª	6th	
2009–10	4	3ª	2nd	
2010–11	4	3ª	4th	

Season	Tier	Division	Place	Copa del Rey
2011–12	4	3ª	5th	
2012–13	4	3ª	5th	
2013–14	4	3ª	3rd	
2014–15	4	3ª	3rd	
2015–16	4	3ª	4th	
2016–17	4	3ª	3rd	
2017–18	4	3ª	6th	
2018–19	4	3ª	6th	
2019–20	4	3ª	6th	
2020–21	4	3ª	3rd / 6th	
2021–22	5	3ª RFEF	4th	
2022–23	5	3ª Fed.	5th	
2023–24	5	3ª Fed.	11th	
2024–25	5	3ª Fed.	8th	
2025–26	5	3ª Fed.	10th	
2026–27	5	3ª Fed.		

- 7 seasons in Segunda División B
- 29 seasons in Tercera División
- 6 seasons in Tercera Federación/Tercera División RFEF

== Famous players ==
- (Argentina) Darío Delgado
- (Argentina) Cristian Green
- (Equatorial Guinea) (Spain) Natanael Borengue
- (Spain) Juan Carlos Castilla
- (Spain) José María Cidoncha
- (Spain) Raúl García
- (Spain) Paco Peña

== Stadium ==
Jerez play home games at the Estadio Manuel Calzado Galván, which has a capacity of 5,000.
