= Adolfo Suárez Stadium =

Sporting venue in Spain

Estadio Adolfo Suárez
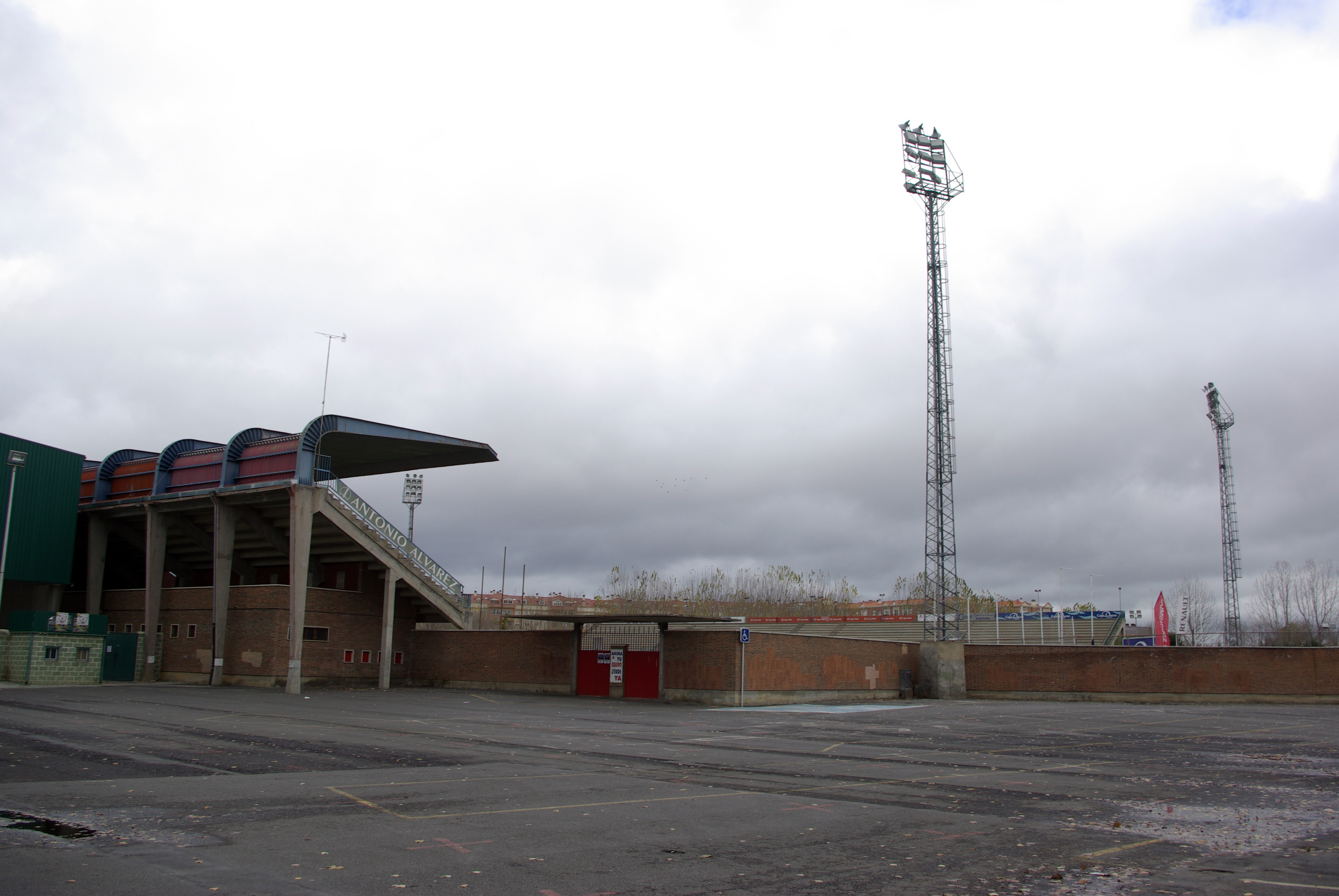
- Interactive map of Estadio Adolfo Suárez
- Full name: Estadio Municipal Adolfo Suárez
- Location: Ávila, Spain
- Coordinates: 40°38′47″N 4°42′6″W
- Owner: Ayuntamiento de Ávila
- Capacity: 6,000

Construction
- Opened: 12 October 1976

Tenant
- Real Ávila CF (1976–present)

The Adolfo Suárez Stadium (Spanish: Estadio Adolfo Suárez) is a football stadium located in the city of Ávila, Spain. Owned by the Ayuntamiento de Ávila, Real Ávila CF plays its home fixtures at the stadium. It has a capacity of 6,000.

== History ==
Named after Adolfo Suárez, prime minister of Spain between 1976 and 1981, it was inaugurated on 12 October 1976, with a friendly fixture between Atlético Madrid and UD Salamanca. Despite a plaque stating otherwise, the then prime minister could not attend the inauguration, and the former was actually unveiled by civil governor Luis Cuesta Gimeno. Suárez attended the first official fixture, Real Ávila CF vs CD Manzanares, played on 31 October.

In 2019, the dismal state of the facilities (featuring an abandoned velodrome and deteriorated pitch and stands) led to the proposal of renovation requests by Real Ávila. As the stadium is built on a "zone of preferential flow" (sic) of the Chico River (a tributary of the Adaja), the prospect of building works around the stadium to erect a new training complex (ciudad deportiva) have been disallowed by the Duero Hydrographic Confederation, the ruling authority for the latter river's basin.
