= 1996–97 Segunda División B =

Segunda División B
- Season: 1996–97
- Promoted: Numancia; Elche; Xerez; Real Jaén
- Relegated: Aranjuez; Moscardó; Celta de Vigo B Marino de Luanco; Real Sociedad B Zamudio; Zalla; Logroñés B Manlleu; Benidorm; Sant Andreu; Llíria; Ejido; Vélez; Realejos; Marbella; Huesca
- Top goalscorer: Iván Rosado (25 goals)
- Best goalkeeper: Roberto Urroz (0.61 goals)
- Biggest home win: Real Avilés 7–1 As Pontes (8 September 1996); Xerez 6–0 Realejos (27 April 1997)
- Biggest away win: Huesca 0–6 Beasain (12 January 1997)
- Highest scoring: Real Avilés 7–1 As Pontes (8 September 1996); Castellón 6–2 Sabadell (8 December 1996)

The season 1996–97 of Segunda División B of Spanish football started August 1996 and ended May 1997.

== Summary before the 1996–97 season ==
Playoffs de Ascenso:

- Las Palmas (P)
- Racing de Ferrol
- Ourense (P)
- Atlético Madrid B (P)
- Sporting de Gijón B
- Osasuna B
- Real Avilés Industrial
- Cultural Leonesa
- Levante (P)
- Gimnàstic de Tarragona
- Figueres
- Valencia B
- Jaén
- Granada
- Elche
- Córdoba

Relegated from Segunda División:

- Sestao Sport (dissolved)
- Athletic Bilbao B
- Getafe
- Marbella

Promoted from Tercera División:

- Celta de Vigo B (from Group 1)
- Real Oviedo B (from Group 2)
- Marino de Luanco (from Group 2)
- Gimnástica de Torrelavega (from Group 3)
- Zalla (from Group 4)
- Gernika (from Group 4)
- Llíria (from Group 6)
- Gandía (from Group 6)
- Carabanchel (from Group 7)
- Ejido (from Group 9)
- Guadix (from Group 9)
- Realejos (from Group 12)
- Murcia (from Group 13)
- Mar Menor (from Group 13)
- Cacereño (from Group 14)
- Zaragoza B (from Group 16)
- Manchego (from Group 17)

Relegated:

- San Sebastián de los Reyes
- Tenerife B
- Móstoles
- Santa Ana
- Tudelano
- Durango
- Palencia
- Amurrio
- Alcoyano
- Ontinyent
- Barcelona C
- Andorra
- Mármol Macael
- Novelda
- Lorca
- Utrera
- Leganés B

Occupied the vacant spots by Sestao Sport dissolution:

- Zamudio (occupied the vacant spot of Sestao Sport)

== Group I ==
Teams from Asturias, Balearic Islands, Castilla–La Mancha, Community of Madrid and Galicia.

=== Teams ===
Location of teams in Segunda División B Gr. 1 1996–97

Team	Founded	Home city	Stadium
Aranjuez	1948	Aranjuez, Madrid	El Deleite
As Pontes	1960	As Pontes de García Rodríguez, Galicia	O Poboado
Real Avilés Industrial	1903	Avilés, Asturias	Román Sánchez Puerta
Carabanchel	1916	Carabanchel, Madrid	La Mina
Celta Vigo B	1927	Vigo, Galicia	Balaídos
Deportivo La Coruña B	1914	A Coruña, Galicia	Anexo de Riazor
Fuenlabrada	1975	Fuenlabrada, Madrid	La Aldehuela
Getafe	1983	Getafe, Madrid	Juan de la Cierva
Langreo	1961	Langreo, Asturias	Ganzábal
Lugo	1953	Lugo, Galicia	Anxo Carro
Mallorca B	1967	Palma de Mallorca, Balearic Islands	Campo Miguel Nadal
Manchego	1929	Ciudad Real, Castilla–La Mancha	Príncipe Juan Carlos
Marino de Luanco	1931	Luanco, Asturias	Miramar
Moscardó	1945	Usera, Madrid	Román Valero
Oviedo B	1930	Oviedo, Asturias	El Requexón
Pontevedra	1941	Pontevedra, Galicia	Pasarón
Racing Ferrol	1919	Ferrol, Galicia	A Malata
Real Madrid C	1952	Madrid, Madrid	Ciudad Deportiva
Sporting Gijón B	1960	Gijón, Asturias	Mareo
Talavera	1948	Talavera de la Reina, Castilla–La Mancha	El Prado

=== League table ===
Pos	Team	Pld	W	D	L	GF	GA	GD	Pts	Qualification or relegation
1	Sporting de Gijón B	38	20	8	10	57	40	+17	68	Qualification for Play-Off
2	Talavera	38	19	10	9	54	35	+19	67	Qualification for Play-Off
3	Manchego	38	18	12	8	52	36	+16	66	Qualification for Play-Off
4	Deportivo de La Coruña B	38	19	9	10	60	43	+17	66	Qualification for Play-Off
5	Lugo	38	18	10	10	71	34	+37	64	
6	Fuenlabrada	38	18	10	10	47	32	+15	64	
7	Racing Ferrol	38	15	11	12	48	41	+7	56	
8	Carabanchel	38	15	11	12	40	43	−3	56	
9	Pontevedra	38	16	6	16	49	48	+1	54	
10	Avilés	38	14	8	16	57	58	−1	50	
11	Mallorca B	38	14	6	18	52	59	−7	48	
12	Oviedo B	38	13	9	16	51	45	+6	48	
13	Real Madrid C	38	14	6	18	48	60	−12	48 (Note: Real Madrid C was relegated due to the relegation of Real Madrid B from Segunda división.)	
14	Langreo	38	12	12	14	43	57	−14	48	
15	As Pontes	38	12	10	16	39	52	−13	46	
16	Getafe	38	12	9	17	44	54	−10	45	Qualification for Play-out
17	Aranjuez	38	12	9	17	42	55	−13	45	Relegation to 1997–98 Tercera División
18	Moscardó	38	12	9	17	48	64	−16	45	Relegation to 1997–98 Tercera División
19	Celta de Vigo B	38	8	13	17	36	51	−15	37	Relegation to 1997–98 Tercera División
20	Marino de Luanco	38	3	14	21	19	50	−31	23	Relegation to 1997–98 Tercera División

Source: BDFútbol
Rules for classification: 1) points; 2) head-to-head points; 3) head-to-head goal difference; 4) head-to-head goals scored; 5) goal difference; 6) number of goals scored.

=== Results ===
Home \ Away	ARA	ASP	AVI	CAR	CEL	DEP	FUE	GET	LAN	LUG	MAL	MAN	MAR	MOS	OVI	PNT	RFE	RMC	SPG	TAL
Aranjuez	—	1–1	1–1	0–0	1–0	0–1	3–1	0–4	1–0	0–3	2–0	1–0	3–0	4–0	2–1	1–1	2–2	1–0	0–1	1–2
As Pontes	2–1	—	0–2	1–2	0–0	0–0	1–1	2–0	1–2	2–1	4–1	2–2	1–1	0–0	1–1	2–0	0–0	3–0	0–3	0–2
Real Avilés Ind.	1–1	7–1	—	1–2	3–0	4–1	2–0	2–3	2–0	1–1	1–0	1–0	2–2	2–1	0–2	1–0	0–1	2–1	1–1	1–2
Carabanchel	0–0	1–0	4–0	—	2–1	3–0	0–0	2–1	2–2	0–0	2–1	1–2	2–0	0–0	0–2	0–1	1–1	0–1	1–5	0–2
Celta B	0–3	2–0	3–0	1–1	—	1–2	1–1	1–1	1–0	2–2	0–3	1–0	0–0	2–0	0–1	0–3	0–2	1–0	0–0	4–3
Deportivo B	3–2	3–0	5–2	2–1	2–2	—	4–0	1–1	3–3	0–0	2–1	1–1	2–0	5–0	2–1	2–1	0–0	4–1	1–2	2–1
Fuenlabrada	2–0	5–0	2–0	1–0	1–0	2–3	—	2–0	0–0	0–1	3–1	0–0	2–1	0–2	0–0	3–2	1–0	3–0	1–0	1–2
Getafe	4–2	3–0	2–3	0–1	0–1	1–0	0–1	—	1–0	0–3	1–1	1–2	0–0	1–0	2–1	2–3	2–2	0–1	2–1	0–3
Langreo	2–1	0–1	1–1	2–0	2–2	1–1	1–0	1–0	—	3–2	0–1	0–0	1–1	1–1	1–1	2–2	0–2	1–2	4–2	2–0
Lugo	4–1	2–1	4–1	6–1	1–1	1–0	0–0	5–1	5–0	—	2–0	3–1	1–0	5–0	2–1	0–1	4–0	2–2	2–1	1–1
Mallorca B	0–0	2–3	2–0	1–1	4–2	3–1	0–1	0–2	4–2	1–0	—	3–2	3–0	2–1	0–2	2–1	3–4	1–0	1–2	0–1
Manchego	5–0	1–0	4–3	0–1	1–0	1–0	1–1	1–1	3–0	3–2	3–1	—	1–0	4–1	1–0	1–0	2–1	1–0	0–0	0–0
Marino de Luanco	0–1	0–0	1–4	0–1	1–0	2–1	0–0	0–0	1–2	0–0	0–0	1–1	—	1–3	1–2	0–0	0–1	0–2	2–0	0–0
Moscardó	0–0	0–3	2–1	1–2	2–2	2–2	2–3	1–3	4–1	1–0	4–2	0–1	2–1	—	2–1	2–1	2–1	2–2	5–0	1–1
Oviedo B	3–0	1–2	1–2	3–0	1–1	1–0	0–2	4–1	1–0	2–1	1–1	2–4	3–0	0–0	—	2–3	1–1	3–0	0–1	1–1
Pontevedra	1–3	1–2	1–0	1–2	0–0	0–1	1–1	2–0	0–1	0–3	0–2	2–1	3–1	1–0	1–0	—	1–3	1–1	3–2	2–0
Racing Ferrol	2–0	2–1	1–0	0–0	1–0	0–1	2–1	1–1	0–1	1–0	0–0	0–0	1–1	1–2	5–2	1–2	—	3–4	0–1	4–2
Real Madrid C	5–2	1–0	2–0	1–1	2–1	2–0	0–4	0–2	2–3	1–0	2–3	1–1	2–0	5–1	2–1	1–5	0–1	—	1–2	0–0
Sporting B	2–1	0–2	2–2	1–2	3–2	0–1	2–0	0–0	1–1	3–1	4–1	5–1	1–0	1–0	1–1	2–0	1–0	3–1	—	1–0
Talavera	1–0	1–0	1–1	2–1	2–1	0–1	0–1	4–1	5–0	1–1	3–1	0–0	2–1	2–1	2–1	1–2	2–1	2–0	0–0	—

Source: BDFútbol
Legend: Blue = home team win; Yellow = draw; Red = away team win.

=== Top goalscorers ===
Goalscorers	Goals	Team
(Spain) Melo	21	Lugo
(Spain) Álex Fernández	17	Sporting de Gijón B
(Spain) Pepe Mel	17	Getafe
(Spain) Vicente Borge	16	Lugo
(Spain) Roberto Losada	16	Oviedo B

=== Top goalkeepers ===
Goalkeeper	Goals	Matches	Average	Team
(Spain) Juanvi Peinado	23	31	0.74	Fuenlabrada
(Spain) José Domínguez	31	37	0.84	Lugo
(Spain) Alejandro Revuelta	34	37	0.92	Talavera
(Venezuela) Fran Martínez	43	38	1.13	Deportivo de La Coruña B
(Spain) Esteban Andrés	43	37	1.16	Oviedo B

== Group II ==
Teams from Aragon, Basque Country, Cantabria, Castile and León, La Rioja and Navarre.

=== Teams ===
Location of teams in Segunda División B Gr. 2 1996–97

Team	Founded	Home city	Stadium
Athletic Bilbao B	1964	Bilbao, Basque Country	San Mamés
Aurrerá Vitoria	1935	Vitoria, Basque Country	Olanrabe
Barakaldo	1917	Barakaldo, Basque Country	Lasesarre
Beasain	1905	Beasain, Basque Country	Loinaz
Bermeo	1950	Bermeo, Basque Country	Itxas Gane
Cultural Leonesa	1923	León, Castile and León	Antonio Amilvia
Gernika	1922	Gernika, Basque Country	Urbieta
Gimnástica Torrelavega	1907	Torrelavega, Cantabria	El Malecón
Huesca	1960	Huesca, Aragon	El Alcoraz
Izarra	1924	Estella-Lizarra, Navarre	Merkatondoa
Lemona	1923	Lemoa, Basque Country	Arlonagusia
Logroñés B	1950	Logroño, La Rioja	Las Gaunas
Numancia	1945	Soria, Castile and León	Los Pajaritos
Osasuna B	1962	Aranguren, Navarre	Tajonar
Real Sociedad B	1951	San Sebastián, Basque Country	Anoeta
Real Unión	1915	Irun, Basque Country	Stadium Gal
Valladolid B	1942	Valladolid, Castile and León	Anexo José Zorrilla
Zalla	1925	Zalla, Basque Country	Landaberri
Zamudio	1943	Zamudio, Basque Country	Gazituaga
Zaragoza B	1958	Zaragoza, Aragon	Ciudad Deportiva del Real Zaragoza

=== League Table ===
Pos	Team	Pld	W	D	L	GF	GA	GD	Pts	Qualification or relegation
1	Aurrerá	38	23	8	7	51	24	+27	77	Qualification for Play-Off
2	Numancia	38	22	9	7	64	25	+39	75	Qualification for Play-Off
3	Barakaldo	38	19	9	10	49	31	+18	66	Qualification for Play-Off
4	Lemona	38	18	7	13	41	33	+8	61	Qualification for Play-Off
5	Valladolid B	38	17	10	11	40	32	+8	61	
6	Izarra	38	15	12	11	38	34	+4	57	
7	Beasain	38	15	11	12	44	39	+5	56	
8	Cultural Leonesa	38	15	11	12	43	49	−6	56	
9	Gernika	38	14	13	11	33	29	+4	55	
10	Gimnástica de Torrelavega	38	13	11	14	35	37	−2	50	
11	Real Unión	38	12	14	12	50	46	+4	50	
12	Bilbao Athletic	38	13	10	15	46	39	+7	49	
13	Bermeo	38	12	11	15	45	47	−2	47	
14	Osasuna B	38	12	10	16	40	42	−2	46	
15	Zaragoza B	38	13	7	18	41	42	−1	46	
16	Huesca	38	13	7	18	30	53	−23	46	Qualification for Play-out
17	Real Sociedad B	38	13	5	20	37	50	−13	44	Relegation to 1997–98 Tercera División
18	Zamudio	38	10	10	18	47	67	−20	40	Relegation to 1997–98 Tercera División
19	Zalla	38	8	12	18	31	43	−12	36	Relegation to 1997–98 Tercera División
20	Logroñés B	38	5	9	24	29	72	−43	24	Relegation to 1997–98 Tercera División

Source: BDFútbol
Rules for classification: 1) points; 2) head-to-head points; 3) head-to-head goal difference; 4) head-to-head goals scored; 5) goal difference; 6) number of goals scored.

=== Results ===
Home \ Away	ATH	AUR	BAR	BEA	BER	CUL	GER	GIM	HUE	IZA	LEM	LOG	NUM	OSA	RSO	RUN	VLD	ZAL	ZAM	ZAR
Athletic B	—	0–2	0–1	1–1	4–0	4–0	4–1	0–0	1–1	0–1	1–1	4–1	1–2	1–0	2–0	1–0	1–1	2–1	2–1	1–1
Aurrerá Vitoria	3–0	—	2–1	3–1	1–0	0–0	0–0	1–0	1–0	1–2	2–0	1–1	0–1	1–0	1–0	2–1	2–1	1–1	4–0	2–1
Barakaldo	1–0	1–1	—	1–0	1–1	2–1	1–1	0–0	3–0	3–0	1–1	2–0	2–1	1–0	2–1	4–1	0–1	1–0	0–0	2–0
Beasain	1–1	1–1	1–0	—	0–0	2–0	2–0	0–0	2–0	0–0	0–1	1–0	0–1	2–1	1–2	0–0	3–1	1–0	0–2	3–0
Bermeo	2–0	0–1	1–0	0–3	—	1–2	3–3	2–4	3–1	1–1	1–0	5–1	1–1	0–1	1–1	4–0	0–0	2–1	1–2	2–1
Cultural Leonesa	1–2	2–2	0–3	0–0	1–0	—	1–0	1–0	2–1	3–0	0–1	0–0	0–0	4–2	2–1	2–2	2–1	3–1	2–0	1–0
Gernika	1–0	1–0	0–0	2–0	1–1	1–2	—	1–0	1–0	1–0	0–0	0–0	0–0	1–0	1–2	1–1	0–0	2–0	1–0	1–0
Gim. Torrelavega	2–0	1–2	0–1	1–1	1–1	1–1	1–0	—	3–1	1–0	1–2	3–0	1–0	1–2	1–0	3–2	0–2	1–0	0–5	0–0
Huesca	1–0	2–0	1–0	0–6	1–0	2–1	1–0	1–1	—	1–0	0–3	3–1	2–2	1–0	0–2	0–1	0–0	1–1	2–1	1–2
Izarra	1–0	1–0	0–0	1–1	0–0	1–0	0–0	1–1	1–0	—	3–0	1–0	1–0	2–1	2–0	2–1	3–0	2–0	4–1	1–2
Lemona	3–1	0–1	3–1	6–1	2–1	0–0	0–1	0–1	0–1	0–0	—	2–1	1–0	0–1	2–2	1–0	2–0	0–0	2–1	1–0
Logroñés B	0–2	1–5	1–3	0–3	1–3	2–3	0–1	2–0	2–0	2–1	0–1	—	1–2	1–1	2–0	1–1	0–4	2–0	1–1	1–2
Numancia	1–0	0–1	1–1	1–0	5–2	5–0	1–4	1–0	3–0	3–0	2–0	5–0	—	0–0	4–2	5–1	1–1	3–1	4–0	1–0
Osasuna B	1–1	1–1	1–0	1–1	0–3	1–1	1–1	0–1	2–0	1–1	1–0	3–0	0–1	—	2–1	1–1	1–2	0–1	3–1	3–0
Real Sociedad B	0–3	0–1	0–2	0–2	2–0	0–1	1–0	1–0	1–2	3–2	1–3	3–1	0–2	2–1	—	1–1	0–1	1–0	1–1	0–0
Real Unión	3–1	0–1	3–1	4–0	1–0	3–2	1–1	0–1	1–1	2–0	3–0	0–0	0–0	4–2	0–2	—	3–0	2–0	3–0	0–0
Valladolid B	1–1	1–0	0–1	0–1	2–0	3–0	1–0	0–0	0–2	0–0	0–2	1–0	1–1	2–1	2–0	3–1	—	2–1	2–0	2–0
Zalla	1–1	1–0	3–0	2–3	0–0	0–0	1–0	3–2	0–0	1–1	3–0	1–1	1–0	0–1	1–0	1–1	0–1	—	1–1	1–1
Zamudio	0–3	1–3	1–4	2–0	0–1	4–1	2–1	1–1	3–0	2–2	1–0	2–2	0–3	2–2	1–2	2–2	0–0	3–2	—	1–4
Zaragoza B	1–0	0–1	4–2	4–0	1–2	1–1	2–3	2–1	3–0	2–0	0–1	2–0	0–1	0–1	0–2	0–0	3–1	1–0	1–2	—

Source: BDFútbol
Legend: Blue = home team win; Yellow = draw; Red = away team win.

=== Top goalscorers ===
Goalscorers	Goals	Team
(Spain) Santi Castillejo	19	Numancia
(Spain) Aiert Derteano	17	Lemona
(Spain) Raúl Loroño	17	Zamudio
(Spain) Julen Castellano	16	Aurrerá
(Spain) Francisco José Fuentes	14	Huesca

=== Top goalkeepers ===
Goalkeeper	Goals	Matches	Average	Team
(Spain) Roberto Urroz	17	28	0.61	Izarra
(Spain) Álvaro Iglesias	23	34	0.68	Barakaldo
(Spain) Laureano Echevarría	25	36	0.69	Numancia
(Spain) Jon Pascua	28	37	0.76	Gernika
(Spain) Rafael Márquez	29	34	0.85	Gimnástica de Torrelavega

== Group III ==
Teams from Andorra, Catalonia, Region of Murcia and Valencian Community.

=== Teams ===
Location of teams in Segunda División B Gr. 3 1996–97

Team	Founded	Home city	Stadium
FC Andorra	1942	Andorra la Vella, Andorra	Comunal
Benidorm	1964	Benidorm, Valencian Community	Foietes
Castellón	1922	Castellón de la Plana, Valencian Community	Nou Castàlia
Elche	1923	Elche, Valencian Community	Martínez Valero
Espanyol B	1994	Barcelona, Catalonia	Sarrià
Figueres	1919	Figueres, Catalonia	Vilatenim
Gandía	1947	Gandia, Valencian Community	Guillermo Olagüe
Gavà	1929	Gavà, Catalonia	La Bòbila
Gimnàstic de Tarragona	1886	Tarragona, Catalonia	Nou Estadi Tarragona
Gramenet	1994	Santa Coloma de Gramenet, Catalonia	Nou Camp Municipal
Hospitalet	1957	L'Hospitalet de Llobregat, Catalonia	Municipal de Deportes
Llíria	N/A	Llíria, Valencian Community	El Cano
Manlleu	1933	Manlleu, Catalonia	Municipal
Mar Menor	1980	San Javier, Region of Murcia	Pitín
Murcia	1919	Murcia, Region of Murcia	La Condomina
Sabadell	1903	Sabadell, Catalonia	Nova Creu Alta
Sant Andreu	1909	Barcelona, Catalonia	Narcís Sala
Terrassa	1906	Terrassa, Catalonia	Olímpic de Terrassa
Valencia B	1944	Valencia, Valencian Community	Ciudad Deportiva de Paterna
Yeclano	1950	Yecla, Region of Murcia	La Constitución

=== League Table ===
Pos	Team	Pld	W	D	L	GF	GA	GD	Pts	Qualification or relegation
1	Gimnàstic	38	21	12	5	52	27	+25	75	Qualification for Play-Off
2	Elche	38	20	9	9	54	38	+16	69	Qualification for Play-Off
3	Gramenet	38	18	12	8	40	31	+9	66	Qualification for Play-Off
4	Figueres	38	18	9	11	57	35	+22	63	Qualification for Play-Off
5	Terrassa	38	17	12	9	59	41	+18	63	
6	FC Andorra	38	15	13	10	42	33	+9	58	
7	L'Hospitalet	38	16	10	12	56	41	+15	58	
8	Espanyol B	38	15	12	11	52	34	+18	57	
9	Castellón	38	16	6	16	45	41	+4	54	
10	Yeclano	38	13	15	10	39	32	+7	54	
11	Sabadell	38	14	11	13	56	55	+1	53	
12	Gavà	38	14	10	14	54	54	0	52	
13	Murcia	38	14	9	15	42	37	+5	51	
14	Valencia Mestalla	38	13	9	16	46	48	−2	48	
15	Gandía	38	11	13	14	37	49	−12	46	
16	Mar Menor	38	9	16	13	40	53	−13	43	Qualification for Play-out
17	Manlleu	38	11	6	21	40	57	−17	39	Relegation to 1997–98 Tercera División
18	Benidorm	38	8	12	18	30	53	−23	36	Relegation to 1997–98 Tercera División
19	Sant Andreu	38	7	12	19	30	43	−13	33	Relegation to 1997–98 Tercera División
20	Llíria	38	2	8	28	18	87	−69	14	Relegation to 1997–98 Tercera División

Source: BDFútbol
Rules for classification: 1) points; 2) head-to-head points; 3) head-to-head goal difference; 4) head-to-head goals scored; 5) goal difference; 6) number of goals scored.

=== Results ===
Home \ Away	AND	BEN	CAS	ELC	ESP	FIG	GAN	GAV	GIM	GRA	HOS	LLI	MAN	MAR	MUR	SAB	SAN	TER	VAL	YEC
FC Andorra	—	0–0	1–0	0–1	0–0	1–1	0–0	4–0	3–2	0–0	2–0	2–0	1–0	0–1	3–2	1–0	2–1	3–0	3–0	0–3
Benidorm	0–0	—	0–2	0–0	1–0	0–1	2–1	1–1	1–2	0–1	0–1	4–1	3–2	0–0	0–0	1–0	2–0	0–0	2–2	0–0
Castellón	1–1	0–2	—	0–1	2–1	2–1	0–2	1–3	2–0	3–0	0–0	2–0	1–0	2–0	1–2	6–2	1–0	3–1	0–1	2–0
Elche	0–0	4–2	2–0	—	2–1	1–0	1–0	1–1	2–2	2–1	0–3	3–0	1–2	4–1	1–0	3–2	3–1	2–2	2–0	2–0
Espanyol B	3–0	2–0	0–1	0–0	—	1–1	5–0	4–0	0–1	0–0	1–0	2–1	0–2	4–0	2–1	1–1	1–1	0–2	3–1	0–0
Figueres	3–1	2–0	4–0	1–0	2–2	—	4–1	1–0	0–2	0–1	3–0	4–0	5–0	2–3	1–2	1–0	1–0	3–1	0–0	1–1
Gandía	2–2	2–0	3–1	1–0	0–1	2–0	—	2–1	0–0	2–2	2–1	1–0	3–1	1–1	0–1	0–3	2–1	1–1	0–2	0–0
Gavà	1–2	3–1	1–1	2–3	3–2	0–0	1–1	—	2–3	0–1	3–2	4–1	3–2	1–0	2–0	1–1	1–1	0–1	0–2	2–0
Gimnàstic	1–0	3–0	1–0	2–0	1–1	0–0	1–0	2–0	—	1–1	1–0	5–1	1–2	2–0	1–1	1–0	1–0	0–0	0–0	1–1
Gramenet	0–1	0–0	2–1	1–0	1–0	2–1	3–1	2–1	0–0	—	0–0	4–0	2–1	2–1	2–1	1–1	1–0	2–3	0–0	0–0
Hospitalet	1–0	3–2	0–0	4–1	0–1	3–1	2–1	3–1	0–2	0–0	—	6–1	3–0	3–3	2–3	1–1	1–1	2–0	1–0	0–0
Llíria	1–3	3–0	0–2	0–0	0–3	0–2	0–0	0–4	0–2	0–2	1–3	—	2–2	0–1	0–2	2–2	0–0	1–0	0-	1–1
Manlleu	1–0	0–1	0–3	0–1	2–3	0–2	0–0	0–1	0–0	1–0	2–1	3–1	—	2–1	2–1	0–1	3–1	2–0	2–2	0–1
Mar Menor	0–0	1–1	2–0	1–1	2–2	0–0	2–1	2–2	1–1	3–0	2–2	0–0	3–1	—	1–3	1–1	1–0	1–1	2–1	0–1
Murcia	3–0	1–0	0–0	1–2	0–0	3–0	0–0	0–2	1–3	0–1	0–0	2–0	1–1	3–0	—	1–1	1–0	0–1	2–0	1–0
Sabadell	0–2	2–1	3–1	1–2	2–1	1–4	0–2	1–2	1–3	2–0	0–4	3–0	3–2	4–1	2–1	—	0–0	4–3	2–0	1–1
Sant Andreu	1–1	3–0	2–3	2–1	1–2	0–1	0–0	1–1	1–2	0–1	0–1	1–1	1–0	0–0	2–1	0–0	—	2–0	3–2	0–3
Terrassa	1–1	4–1	2–1	1–1	2–1	1–1	5–0	3–0	3–0	2–2	1–0	4–0	1–0	3–1	1–1	3–4	1–1	—	1–0	3–0
Valencia B	1–1	4–0	0–0	1–3	1–2	3–1	1–1	1–3	3–1	3–1	4–1	4–0	1–0	0–0	2–0	1–4	0–2	0–1	—	1–4
Yeclano	2–1	2–2	1–0	2–1	0–0	1–2	4–2	1–1	0–1	0–1	1–2	3–0	2–2	2–1	1–0	0–0	1–0	0–0	0–1	—

Source: BDFútbol
Legend: Blue = home team win; Yellow = draw; Red = away team win.

=== Top goalscorers ===
Goalscorers	Goals	Team
(Spain) Diego Ribera	23	Figueres
(Spain) Kiko Ramírez	18	Sabadell
(Spain) Enric Cuxart	15	Elche
(Spain) Eloy Jiménez	15	Elche
(Spain) José Ramón Preciado	13	Gimnàstic

=== Top goalkeepers ===
Goalkeeper	Goals	Matches	Average	Team
(Spain) Iñaki Sáiz	23	28	0.82	FC Andorra
(Spain) Antonio Morales	30	36	0.83	Gramenet
(Spain) Ricardo Pérez	28	32	0.88	Yeclano
(Spain) Rodri	34	37	0.92	Figueres
(Spain) Iru	33	35	0.94	Elche

== Group IV ==
Teams from Andalusia, Canary Islands, Extremadura and Melilla.

=== Teams ===
Location of teams in Segunda División B Gr. 4 1996–97
Canary Islands

Team	Founded	Home city	Stadium
Polideportivo Almería	1983	Almería, Andalusia	Juan Rojas
Betis B	1962	Seville, Andalusia	Benito Villamarín
Cádiz	1910	Cádiz, Andalusia	Ramón de Carranza
Cacereño	1919	Cáceres, Extremadura	Príncipe Felipe
Córdoba	1954	Córdoba, Andalusia	Nuevo Arcángel
Polideportivo Ejido	1969	El Ejido, Andalusia	Santo Domingo
Gáldar	1988	Gáldar, Canary Islands	Barrial
Granada	1931	Granada, Andalusia	Nuevo Los Cármenes
Guadix	1932	Guadix, Andalusia	Municipal
Real Jaén	1929	Jaén, Andalusia	La Victoria
Málaga	1948	Málaga, Andalusia	La Rosaleda
Marbella	1947	Marbella, Andalusia	Municipal de Marbella
Melilla	1976	Melilla	Álvarez Claro
Mensajero	1924	Santa Cruz de La Palma, Canary Islands	Silvestre Carrillo
Realejos	1943	Los Realejos, Canary Islands	Los Príncipes
Recreativo de Huelva	1889	Huelva, Andalusia	Colombino
San Pedro	1974	San Pedro de Alcántara, Andalusia	Municipal de San Pedro
Sevilla B	1950	Seville, Andalusia	Viejo Nervión
Vélez	1922	Vélez-Málaga, Andalusia	Vivar Téllez
Xerez	1947	Jerez de la Frontera, Andalusia	Chapín

=== League Table ===
Pos	Team	Pld	W	D	L	GF	GA	GD	Pts	Qualification or relegation
1	Córdoba	38	22	5	11	61	38	+23	71	Qualification for Play-Off
2	Xerez	38	19	10	9	54	36	+18	67	Qualification for Play-Off
3	Jaén	38	18	12	8	47	27	+20	66	Qualification for Play-Off
4	Recreativo	38	17	12	9	47	32	+15	63	Qualification for Play-Off
5	Málaga	38	15	15	8	42	27	+15	60	
6	Granada	38	15	13	10	51	34	+17	58	
7	Cádiz	38	16	9	13	52	39	+13	57	
8	Mensajero	38	13	15	10	45	43	+2	54	
9	Sevilla B	38	14	10	14	52	48	+4	52	
10	Gáldar	38	13	12	13	50	46	+4	51	
11	Melilla	38	14	9	15	32	35	−3	51	
12	Cacereño	38	11	16	11	46	44	+2	49	
13	San Pedro	38	13	9	16	34	42	−8	48	
14	Betis B	38	12	11	15	39	43	−4	47	
15	Guadix	38	10	15	13	25	35	−10	45	
16	Polideportivo Almería	38	12	9	17	33	39	−6	45	Qualification for Play-out
17	Ejido	38	10	14	14	33	40	−7	44	Relegation to 1997–98 Tercera División
18	Vélez	38	8	12	18	44	69	−25	36	Relegation to 1997–98 Tercera División
19	Realejos	38	10	6	22	27	63	−36	36	Relegation to 1997–98 Tercera División
20	Marbella	38	5	12	21	23	57	−34	27	Relegation to 1997–98 Tercera División

Source: BDFútbol
Rules for classification: 1) points; 2) head-to-head points; 3) head-to-head goal difference; 4) head-to-head goals scored; 5) goal difference; 6) number of goals scored.

=== Results ===
Home \ Away	CPA	BET	CAC	CAD	COR	EJI	GAL	GRA	GUA	JAE	MGA	MAR	MEL	MEN	REA	REC	SPE	SEV	VEL	XER
Poli Almería	—	1–2	2–0	0–2	0–2	1–1	0–2	2–0	1–2	1–1	0–0	1–0	0–1	0–3	2–0	0–0	3–1	1–0	4–0	1–2
Betis B	0–0	—	2–0	3–1	1–3	0–0	3–2	1–2	3–0	0–2	0–0	2–0	1–3	1–1	0–1	2–1	0–1	3–1	3–3	1–1
Cacereño	1–0	0–0	—	1–1	0–2	1–0	2–1	1–3	0–0	1–1	1–1	2–1	3–0	3–1	5–1	2–2	1–1	2–2	2–4	3–0
Cádiz	1–0	3–1	1–0	—	1–0	0–0	3–3	0–1	0–1	1–1	5–1	0–1	0–1	4–0	2–0	2–1	4–1	3–1	1–0	0–2
Córdoba	3–0	3–2	2–1	1–1	—	1–2	4–2	0–3	2–0	1–0	1–0	3–0	1–0	2–2	0–1	1–2	3–0	2–3	2–1	1–0
Ejido	1–1	1–1	1–3	0–0	1–0	—	1–1	1–1	3–0	0–2	1–2	2–1	0–1	0–0	1–0	1–0	0–1	1–1	3–1	0–3
Gáldar	2–2	2–0	2–0	1–0	1–3	1–1	—	1–2	0–0	3–1	0–0	3–1	2–0	1–1	0–0	0–1	2–1	2–2	5–2	2–0
Granada	0–1	1–0	2–0	0–0	1–1	1–1	2–1	—	0–0	0–1	1–1	2–0	2–1	1–2	3–0	0–1	1–1	2–0	5–1	1–1
Guadix	1–0	0–0	1–1	4–1	0–1	1–0	1–0	0–0	—	0–0	1–1	3–0	0–0	0–0	2–0	1–1	2–1	0–1	0–0	0–2
Jaén	1–1	1–0	0–0	1–0	0–1	1–0	2–0	3–1	0–0	—	1–0	3–0	0–0	2–2	4–0	1–0	1–0	2–0	1–1	1–2
Málaga	0–0	2–0	0–0	1–2	2–3	0–0	4–0	0–0	2–0	2–1	—	3–0	2–2	2–0	1–0	1–0	2–0	2–1	1–0	2–0
Marbella	0–2	1–1	1–1	1–4	2–2	1–2	0–1	2–2	0–0	2–0	0–3	—	1–0	1–0	0–1	0–0	1–1	3–3	1–0	1–2
Melilla	0–1	0–0	1–0	3–0	1–2	1–0	2–1	1–1	1–0	1–0	2–0	2–0	—	0–0	1–0	1–2	0–2	0–2	0–0	1–1
Mensajero	2–0	1–0	1–1	3–2	1–1	0–1	1–0	0–2	3–1	0–0	1–0	2–0	1–0	—	1–1	1–4	1–0	4–0	1–2	1–3
Realejos	0–1	2–0	1–3	0–4	0–2	1–0	1–3	2–1	4–0	1–4	0–1	0–0	0–0	1–0	—	3–0	1–1	0–2	3–1	0–0
Recreativo	1–0	2–0	2–2	1–2	1–0	2–2	1–0	2–0	2–0	0–0	2–2	1–0	1–0	2–2	2–0	—	3–0	0–0	3–0	1–2
San Pedro	1–0	0–1	1–1	1–1	1–0	0–1	0–1	1–0	2–0	4–0	1–0	1–1	2–0	1–1	1–0	1–1	—	1–0	3–0	0–1
Sevilla B	1–3	0–1	0–1	0–0	3–2	4–1	1–1	2–1	0–2	1–2	0–0	2–0	3–1	1–1	4–0	2–0	4–0	—	2–0	0–4
Vélez	2–0	0–2	2–2	2–0	1–3	3–2	0–0	2–2	2–1	0–3	0–0	0–0	1–3	3–3	5–2	0–0	3–0	0–3	—	1–2
Xerez	3–1	1–2	1–0	1–0	1–0	2–1	1–1	1–4	1–1	1–3	1–1	0–0	3–1	0–1	6–0	1–2	1–0	0–0	1–1	—

Source: BDFútbol
Legend: Blue = home team win; Yellow = draw; Red = away team win.

=== Top goalscorers ===
Goalscorers	Goals	Team
(Spain) Iván Rosado	25	Recreativo
(Spain) Miguel Puente	17	Mensajero
(Spain) José Luis Loreto	14	Córdoba
(Spain) Fali	12	Xerez
(Spain) José Luis Batista	12	Gáldar

=== Top goalkeepers ===
Goalkeeper	Goals	Matches	Average	Team
(Spain) Emilio Álvarez	23	36	0.64	Jaén
(Spain) Yosu Anuzita	24	31	0.77	Málaga
(Spain) César Quesada	24	28	0.86	Recreativo
(Spain) Alex Pinilla	29	33	0.88	Polideportivo Almería
(Spain) Antonio Notario	33	37	0.89	Guadix

== Play-offs ==
=== Group A ===
Pos	Team	Pld	W	D	L	GF	GA	GD	Pts	Promotion
1	Elche (P)	6	3	2	1	7	3	+4	11	Promoted to Segunda División
2	Córdoba	6	3	2	1	7	5	+2	11	
3	Deportivo de La Coruña B	6	2	2	2	10	7	+3	8	
4	Barakaldo	6	0	2	4	4	13	−9	2	

Source: futbolme
Rules for classification: 1) points; 2) head-to-head points; 3) head-to-head goal difference; 4) head-to-head goals scored; 5) goal difference; 6) number of goals scored.
(P) Promoted

=== Group B ===
Pos	Team	Pld	W	D	L	GF	GA	GD	Pts	Promotion
1	Xerez (P)	6	5	0	1	10	1	+9	15	Promoted to Segunda División
2	Gramenet	6	4	1	1	9	2	+7	13	
3	Sporting de Gijón B	6	2	0	4	5	13	−8	6	
4	Lemona	6	0	1	5	1	9	−8	1	

Source: futbolme
Rules for classification: 1) points; 2) head-to-head points; 3) head-to-head goal difference; 4) head-to-head goals scored; 5) goal difference; 6) number of goals scored.
(P) Promoted

=== Group C ===
Pos	Team	Pld	W	D	L	GF	GA	GD	Pts	Promotion
1	Jaén (P)	6	5	1	0	11	2	+9	16	Promoted to Segunda División
2	Talavera	6	2	2	2	6	9	−3	8	
3	Aurrerá	6	2	1	3	7	7	0	7	
4	Figueres	6	1	0	5	4	10	−6	3	

Source: futbolme
Rules for classification: 1) points; 2) head-to-head points; 3) head-to-head goal difference; 4) head-to-head goals scored; 5) goal difference; 6) number of goals scored.
(P) Promoted

=== Group D ===
Pos	Team	Pld	W	D	L	GF	GA	GD	Pts	Promotion
1	Numancia (P)	6	3	3	0	9	5	+4	12	Promoted to Segunda División
2	Recreativo	6	3	2	1	7	5	+2	11	
3	Gimnàstic	6	2	2	2	8	5	+3	8	
4	Manchego	6	0	1	5	2	11	−9	1	

Source: futbolme
Rules for classification: 1) points; 2) head-to-head points; 3) head-to-head goal difference; 4) head-to-head goals scored; 5) goal difference; 6) number of goals scored.
(P) Promoted

== Play-out ==
=== Semifinal ===
Team 1	Agg.	Team 2	1st leg	2nd leg
Huesca	2–5	Getafe	2–1	0–4
Mar Menor	0–2	Polideportivo Almería	0–2	0–0

=== Final ===
Team 1	Agg.	Team 2	1st leg	2nd leg
Huesca	1–6	Mar Menor	1–1	0–5
