= 1997 Segunda División B play-offs =

Spanish football league play-offs

The 1997 Segunda División B play-offs (Playoffs de Ascenso or Promoción de Ascenso) were the final playoffs for promotion from 1996–97 Segunda División B to the 1997–98 Segunda División. The four first placed teams in each of the four Segunda División B groups played the Playoffs de Ascenso and the four last placed teams in Segunda División were relegated to Segunda División B.

The teams play a league of four teams, divided into 4 groups. The champion of each group is promoted to Segunda División.

== Group A ==
=== League table ===
Pos	Team	Pld	W	D	L	GF	GA	GD	Pts	Promotion or relegation
1	Elche CF (P)	6	3	2	1	7	3	+4	11	Promotion to Segunda División
2	Córdoba CF	6	3	2	1	7	5	+2	11	
3	Deportivo de La Coruña B	6	2	2	2	10	7	+3	8	
4	Barakaldo CF	6	0	2	4	4	13	−9	2	

Source: arquero-arba
Rules for classification: 1st points; 2nd head-to-head points; 3rd head-to-head goal difference; 4th head-to-head goals scored; 5th goal difference; 6th number of goals scored
(P) Promoted

=== Results ===
Home \ Away	ELC	COR	DCO	BAR
Elche CF		0–0	2–1	4–0
Córdoba CF	0–0		1–4	3–0
Deportivo de La Coruña B	2–0	0–1		1–1
Barakaldo CF	0–1	1–2	2–2	

Source: arquero-arba
Legend: Blue = home team win; Yellow = draw; Red = away team win.

== Group B ==
=== League table ===
Pos	Team	Pld	W	D	L	GF	GA	GD	Pts	Promotion or relegation
1	Xerez CD (P)	6	5	0	1	10	1	+9	15	Promotion to Segunda División
2	UDA Gramenet	6	4	1	1	9	2	+7	13	
3	Sporting Gijón B	6	2	0	4	5	13	−8	6	
4	SD Lemona	6	0	1	5	1	9	−8	1	

Source: arquero-arba
Rules for classification: 1st points; 2nd head-to-head points; 3rd head-to-head goal difference; 4th head-to-head goals scored; 5th goal difference; 6th number of goals scored
(P) Promoted

=== Results ===
Home \ Away	XER	GRA	SPG	LEM
Xerez CD		1–0	5–0	1–0
UDA Gramenet	1–0		3–0	1–1
Sporting Gijón B	0–2	3–0		4–0
SD Lemona	0–1	0–1	0–1	

Source: arquero-arba
Legend: Blue = home team win; Yellow = draw; Red = away team win.

== Group C ==
=== League table ===
Pos	Team	Pld	W	D	L	GF	GA	GD	Pts	Promotion or relegation
1	Real Jaén (P)	6	5	1	0	11	2	+9	16	Promotion to Segunda División
2	Talavera CF	6	2	2	2	6	9	−3	8	
3	Aurrerá de Vitoria	6	2	1	3	7	7	0	7	
4	UE Figueres	6	1	0	5	4	10	−6	3	

Source: arquero-arba
Rules for classification: 1st points; 2nd head-to-head points; 3rd head-to-head goal difference; 4th head-to-head goals scored; 5th goal difference; 6th number of goals scored
(P) Promoted

=== Results ===
Home \ Away	RJN	TAL	AVI	FIG
Real Jaén		1–1	3–0	3–1
Talavera CF	0–2		1–1	2–0
Aurrerá de Vitoria	0–1	4–0		0–1
UE Figueres	0–1	1–2	1–2	

Source: arquero-arba
Legend: Blue = home team win; Yellow = draw; Red = away team win.

== Group D ==
=== League table ===
Pos	Team	Pld	W	D	L	GF	GA	GD	Pts	Promotion or relegation
1	CD Numancia (P)	6	3	3	0	9	5	+4	12	Promotion to Segunda División
2	Recreativo de Huelva	6	3	2	1	7	5	+2	11	
3	Gimnàstic de Tarragona	6	2	2	2	8	5	+3	8	
4	CD Manchego	6	0	1	5	2	11	−9	1	

Source: arquero-arba
Rules for classification: 1st points; 2nd head-to-head points; 3rd head-to-head goal difference; 4th head-to-head goals scored; 5th goal difference; 6th number of goals scored
(P) Promoted

=== Results ===
Home \ Away	NUM	RHU	GTA	MAN
CD Numancia		2–0	1–0	2–1
Recreativo de Huelva	3–3		2–0	1–0
Gimnàstic de Tarragona	1–1	0–0		4–1
CD Manchego	0–0	0–1	0–3	

Source: arquero-arba
Legend: Blue = home team win; Yellow = draw; Red = away team win.
