= Lekunbiz station =

Railway station in Zamudio, Basque Country, Spain

Lekunbiz
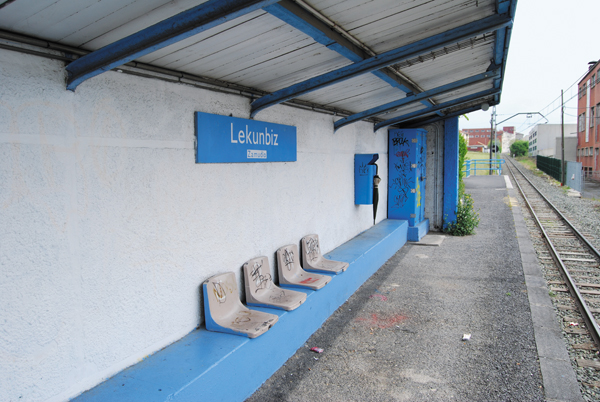
- View of the station before the 2018 renovation

General information
- Location: Zamudio, Biscay; Spain
- Coordinates: 43°17′12″N 2°52′29″W
- Owner: Euskal Trenbide Sarea
- Operator: Euskotren
- Line: Line E3
- Platforms: 1 side platform
- Tracks: 1

Construction
- Structure type: At-grade
- Parking: No
- Accessible: Yes

Other information
- Fare zone: Zone 2

History
- Opened: 2 May 1894

Services
Preceding station	Euskotren Trena	Following station
Zamudio towards Lezama	Line E3	Derio towards Kukullaga
Location

Lekunbiz is a railway station in Zamudio, Basque Country, Spain. It is owned by Euskal Trenbide Sarea and operated by Euskotren. It lies on the Txorierri line.

== History ==
The station was opened together with the Txorierri line in 1894. It was renovated in 2018 after trains on the Txorierri line started running through metro Line 3.

== Services ==
The station is served by Euskotren Trena line E3. It runs every 15 minutes (in each direction) during weekdays, and every 30 minutes during weekends. A bus service run by Euskotren links the station with the Bizkaia Technology Park.
