= AD Mar Menor-San Javier =

Spanish football club

Mar Menor
- Full name: Agrupación Deportiva Mar; Menor-San Javier
- Founded: 1980
- Dissolved: 2007
- Ground: Pitín, San Javier, Murcia, Spain
- Capacity: 3,000
- Chairman: (Spain) José Francisco Villaescusa
- Manager: (Spain) Gabriel Correa
- League: Defunct
- 2006–07: 3ª - Group 13, 5th
Home colours	Away colours

Agrupación Deportiva Mar Menor-San Javier was a Spanish football team based in San Javier, in the Region of Murcia. Founded in 1980, it last played in Tercera División - Group 13, holding home matches at Estadio Pitín, with a capacity of 3,000 seats.

== History ==
Founded in 1980, Mar Menor first reached the national categories eight years later, and would remain in Tercera División for the remainder of its existence, safe for two (consecutive) years in Segunda División B.

In the summer of 2007, the team disappeared due to financial problems.

== Seasons ==
Season	Tier	Division	Place	Copa del Rey
1981–82	7	2ª Reg.	12th	
1982–83	7	2ª Reg.	5th	
1983–84	7	2ª Reg.	14th	
1984–85	7	2ª Reg.	8th	
1985–86	7	2ª Reg.	3rd	
1986–87	6	1ª Reg.	5th	
1987–88	5	Reg. Pref.	2nd	
1988–89	4	3ª	15th	
1989–90	4	3ª	3rd	
1990–91	4	3ª	3rd	First round
1991–92	4	3ª	8th	First round
1992–93	4	3ª	4th	
1993–94	4	3ª	9th	Second round

Season	Tier	Division	Place	Copa del Rey
1994–95	4	3ª	13th	
1995–96	4	3ª	3rd	
1996–97	3	2ª B	16th	Second round
1997–98	3	2ª B	20th	
1998–99	4	3ª	3rd	
1999–2000	4	3ª	3rd	
2000–01	4	3ª	5th	
2001–02	4	3ª	6th	
2002–03	4	3ª	3rd	
2003–04	4	3ª	1st	
2004–05	4	3ª	3rd	First round
2005–06	4	3ª	2nd	
2006–07	4	3ª	5th	

- 2 seasons in Segunda División B
- 17 seasons in Tercera División

== Famous players ==
- (Equatorial Guinea) (Spain) Rubén Epitié
- (Senegal) Limamou Mbengue
- (Spain) Antonio Luque
- (Spain) Gorka Sangroniz
- (Spain) Mariano Sánchez
- (Spain) Leoncio Gómez
- (Spain) Antonio Cañadas
- (Spain) Rafael Rodríguez
- (Spain) Hugo Grandio
- (Spain) Ignacio Sendín
