= Emilio Álvarez (Spanish footballer) =

Spanish footballer

Personal information
- Full name: Emilio Álvarez Blanco
- Date of birth: 19 October 1971 (age 55)
- Place of birth: Madrid, Spain
- Height: 1.85 m (6 ft 1 in)
- Position: Goalkeeper

Youth career
- Real Madrid
- 1991–1992: Rayo Vallecano

Senior career*
Years	Team	Apps	(Gls)
1992	Palencia	4	(0)
1995–1996	Moscardó	35	(0)
1996–1997	Jaén	36	(0)
1997–1998	Extremadura	1	(0)
1998–1999	Recreativo de Huelva	1	(0)
1999–2000	Elche	0	(0)
2000–2001	Algeciras	27	(0)
2002	Mensajero	19	(0)
2002–2003	Extremadura	6	(0)
Total		129	(0)

Managerial career
- 2003–2005: Real Madrid Castilla (Goalkeeping Coach)
- 2005–2007: Valencia (Goalkeeping Coach)
- 2008–2009: Benfica (Goalkeeping Coach)
- 2009–2011: Atlético Madrid (Goalkeeping Coach)
- 2016–2019: Manchester United (Goalkeeping Coach)
- 2022–2023: Al Wasl (Goalkeeping Coach)
- 2023–2025: Tractor (Goalkeeping Coach)
- 2025–: Persepolis (Goalkeeping Coach)
- * Club domestic league appearances and goals

Emilio Álvarez Blanco (born 19 October 1971), is a retired Spanish footballer who played as a goalkeeper. He used to serve as a goalkeeping coach for English side Manchester United.

== Career statistics ==
=== Club ===
Club	Season	League			Cup		Other		Total	
Club	Season	Division	Apps	Goals	Apps	Goals	Apps	Goals	Apps	Goals
Palencia	1992–93	Segunda División B	4	0	0	0	0	0	4	0
Moscardó	1995–96	Segunda División B	35	0	1 (Note: Appearances in the King's Cup)	0	0	0	36	0
Jaén	1996–97	Segunda División B	36	0	2	0	5 (Note: Appearances in the Segunda División B play-offs)	0	43	0
Extremadura	1997–98	Segunda División	1	0	1	0	0	0	2	0
Recreativo de Huelva	1998–99	Segunda División	1	0	4	0	0	0	5	0
Elche	1999–00	Segunda División	0	0	1	0	0	0	1	0
Algeciras	2000–01	Segunda División B	27	0	0	0	2	0	29	0
Mensajero	2001–02	Segunda División B	19	0	0	0	0	0	19	0
Extremadura	2002–03	Segunda División B	6	0	0	0	0	0	6	0
Career total			129	0	9	0	7	0	145	0
