= Estadio de Lasesarre =

Stadium in Barakaldo, Spain

Coordinates: 43°18′10″N 2°59′11″W

Lasesarre
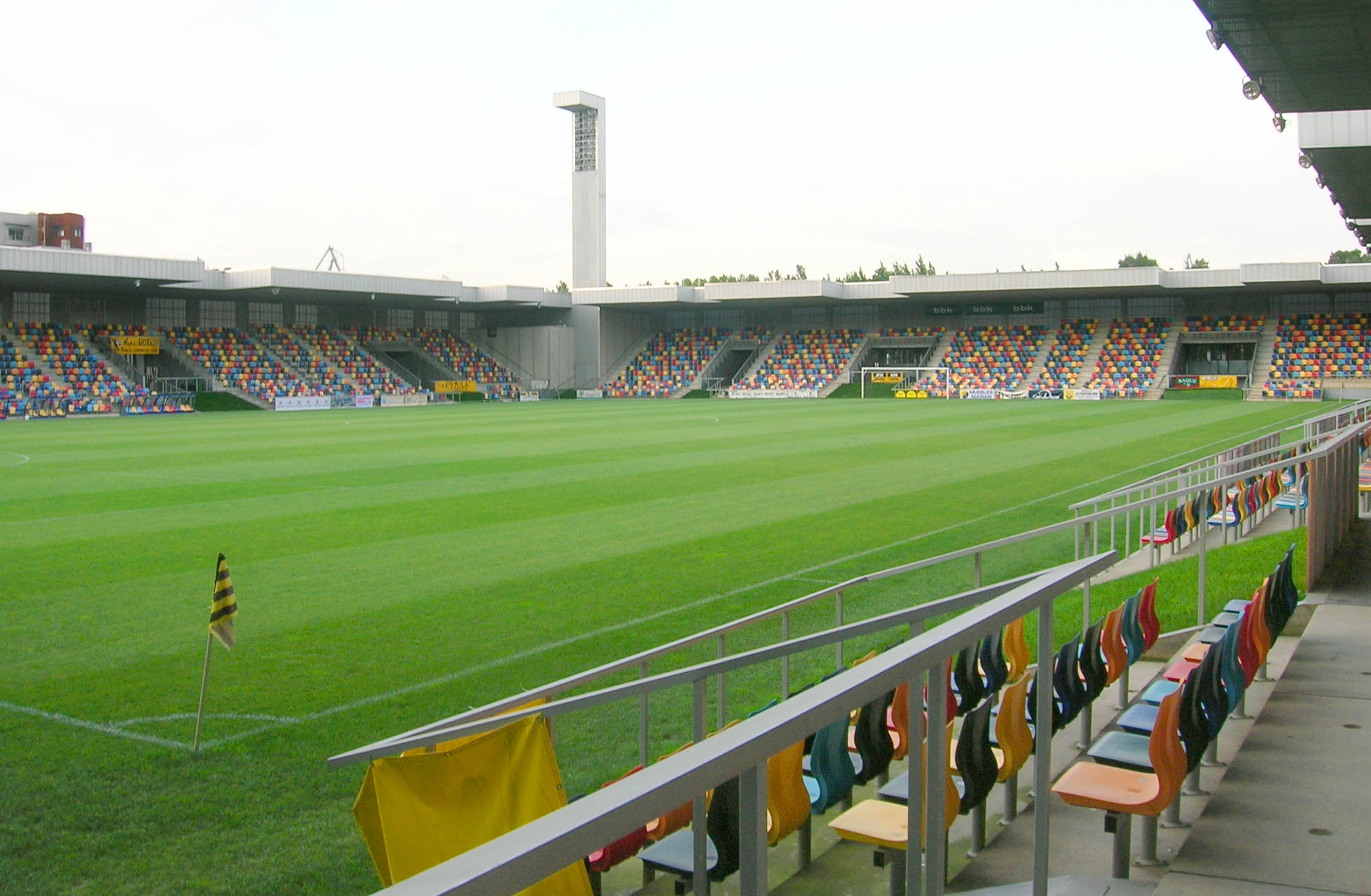
- Interactive map of Lasesarre
- Location: Barakaldo, Spain
- Capacity: 7,960
- Surface: Grass
- Field size: 105 m × 68 m (344 ft × 223 ft)

Construction
- Opened: 2003

Tenant
- Barakaldo CF,

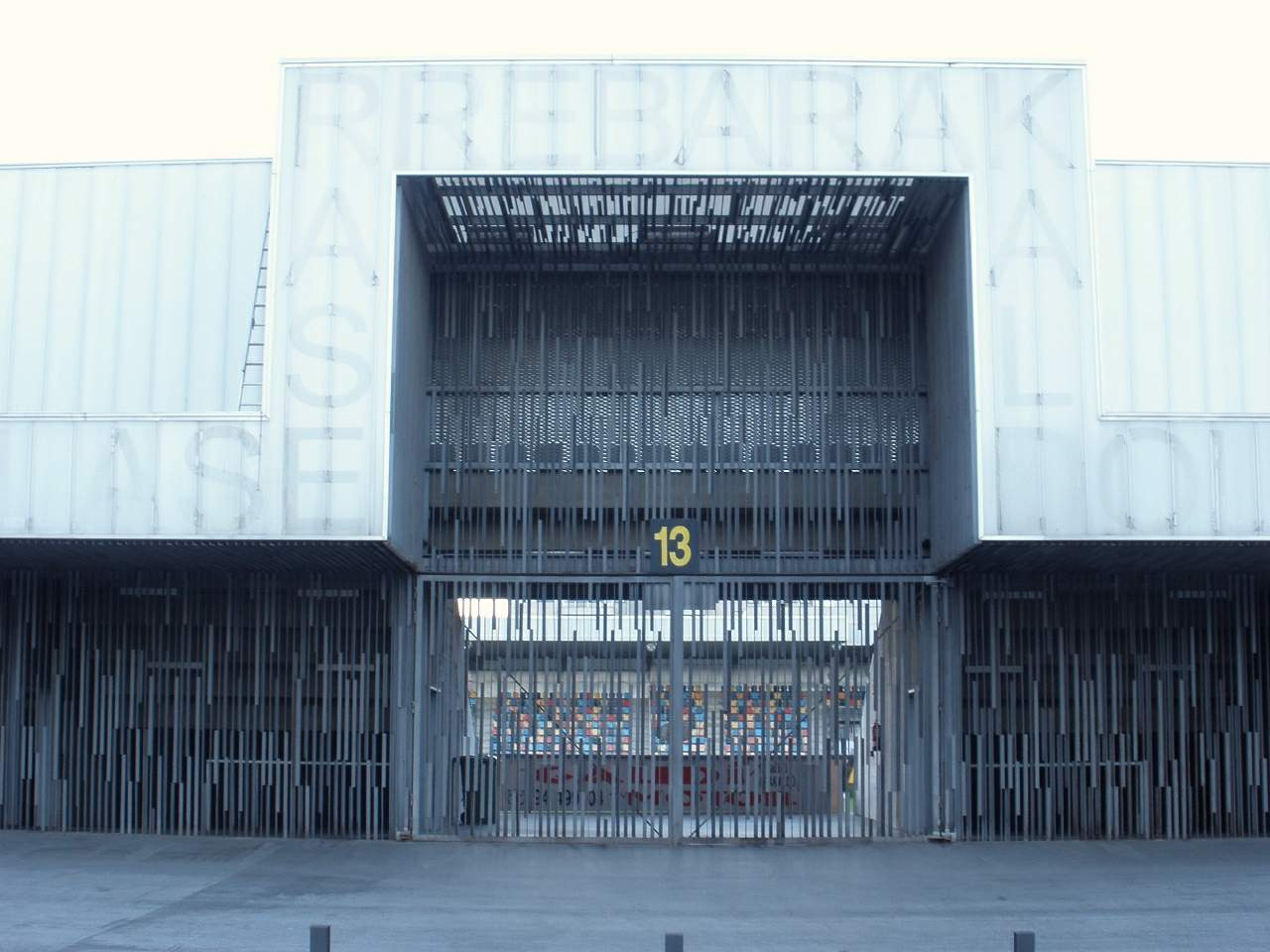
One of the entrances to the stand

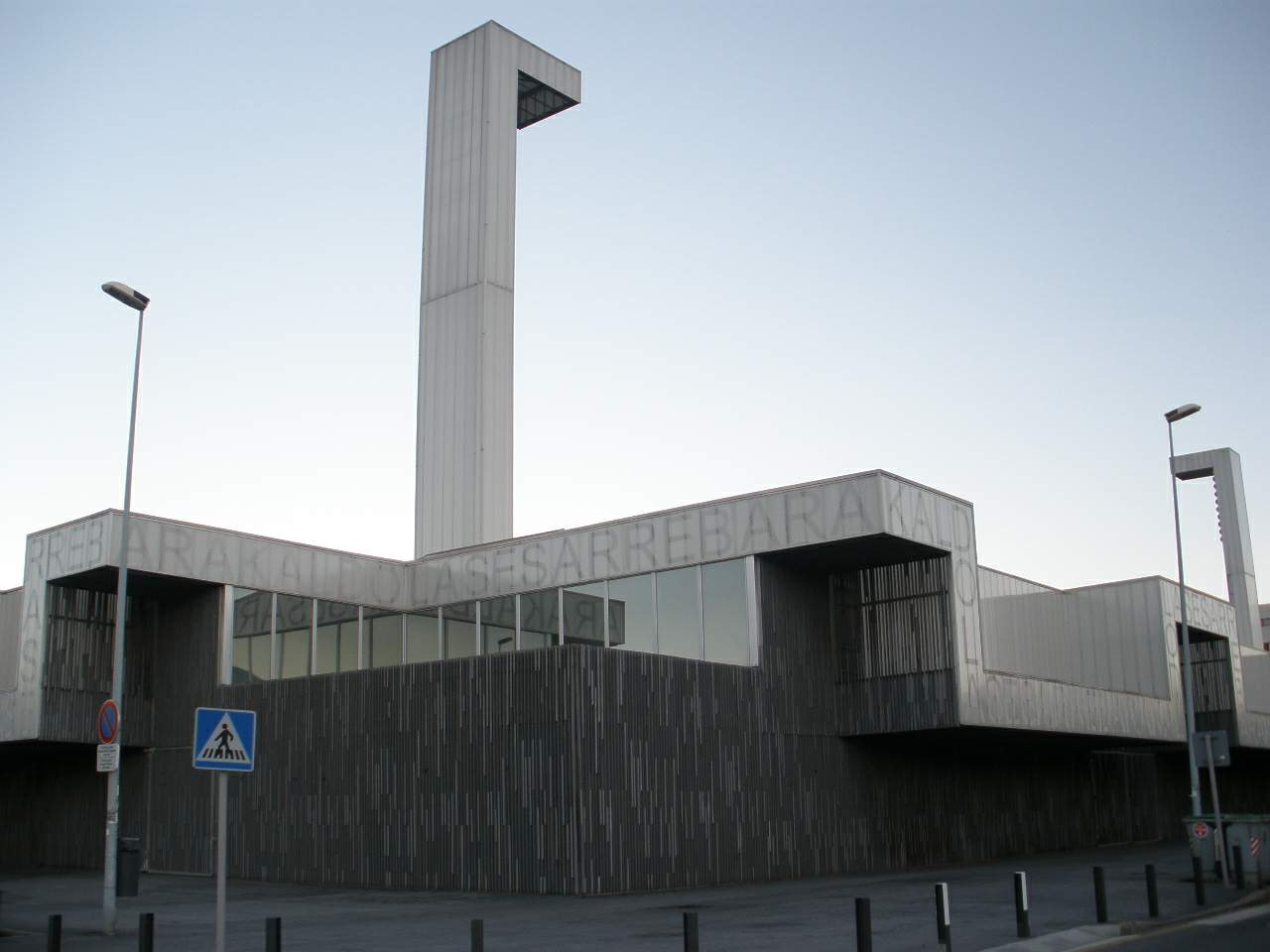
External view

Lasesarre is a stadium in Barakaldo, Spain. It is currently used for football matches and is the home stadium of Barakaldo CF. The stadium holds 7,960 spectators.
