= Álvaro Martínez (footballer, born 1974) =

Spanish footballer and manager

Álvaro
Personal information
- Full name: Álvaro Martínez Beltrán
- Date of birth: 30 March 1974 (age 52)
- Place of birth: Vitoria, Spain
- Height: 1.86 m (6 ft 1 in)
- Position: Goalkeeper

Youth career
- 1985–1992: Aurrerá
- 1990–1991: → Olárizu (loan)

Senior career*
Years	Team	Apps	(Gls)
1992–1993	Aurrerá		
1993–1995	Bilbao Athletic	13	(0)
1995–1997	Aurrerá	25	(0)
1997–1998	Burgos	15	(0)
1998–2001	Lemona	78	(0)
2001–2004	Conquense	75	(0)
2004–2005	Benidorm	35	(0)
2005–2006	San Isidro	18	(0)
2006–2007	Cultural Leonesa	3	(0)
2007–2009	Villarrobledo	64	(0)
2009–2010	San José Obrero	35	(0)
Total		361	(0)

Managerial career
- 2009–2011: Conquense (youth)
- 2011–2013: San José Obrero (youth)
- 2013–2015: Conquense (assistant)
- 2015: Conquense
- 2016–2017: Nanjing Honor
- * Club domestic league appearances and goals

Álvaro Martínez Beltrán (born 30 March 1974), known simply as Álvaro, is a Spanish former footballer who played as a goalkeeper.

== Club career ==
Born in Vitoria-Gasteiz, Álava, Álvaro began his career with local CD Aurrerá de Vitoria, promoting to the Tercera División in his first season as a senior. In the summer of 1993 he signed with Basque giants Athletic Bilbao, playing his only two years at the professional level with the reserve side in Segunda División, being second choice.

Álvaro returned to his first club in 1995, going on to represent in the following 14 years Burgos CF, SD Lemona, UB Conquense, Benidorm CF, CD San Isidro, Cultural y Deportiva Leonesa and CP Villarrobledo, in both the Segunda División B and the fourth tier. He retired at the end of the 2009–10 campaign, after one year with amateurs AD San José Obrero (fifth division).

During his playing career, Álvaro also served as youth goalkeeper coach in the clubs he played for. After his retirement, he worked as a manager in youth teams.
