= Antonio Cañadas =

Spanish footballer

Personal information
- Full name: Antonio Cañadas Zapata
- Date of birth: 13 June 1979 (age 47)
- Place of birth: San Javier, Spain
- Height: 1.70 m (5 ft 7 in)
- Position: Midfielder

Youth career
- Mar Menor
- Murcia

Senior career*
Years	Team	Apps	(Gls)
1998–1999	Mar Menor		
1999–2000	Elche B		
2000	→ Alone (loan)		
2000–2001	Elche	2	(1)
2000–2001	→ Toledo (loan)	28	(5)
2001–2002	Elche B		
2002–2004	Mar Menor	34	(11)
2004–2006	Sabadell	66	(19)
2006–2007	Jaén	30	(13)
2007–2008	Alicante	39	(7)
2008–2010	Poli Ejido	57	(12)
2010–2011	Murcia	30	(8)
2011–2012	Alcoyano	23	(2)
2012–2013	Cartagena	29	(4)
2013–2014	Orihuela	16	(3)
2014–2017	Eldense	78	(22)
2017–2018	Lorca Deportiva	26	(5)
Total		458	(112)
- * Club domestic league appearances and goals

Antonio Cañadas Zapata (born 13 June 1979 in San Javier, Murcia) is a Spanish former footballer who played as a midfielder.
