= Lycée Français de Bilbao =

International school in Bilbao, Spain

Coordinates: 43.2837°N 2.8977°W

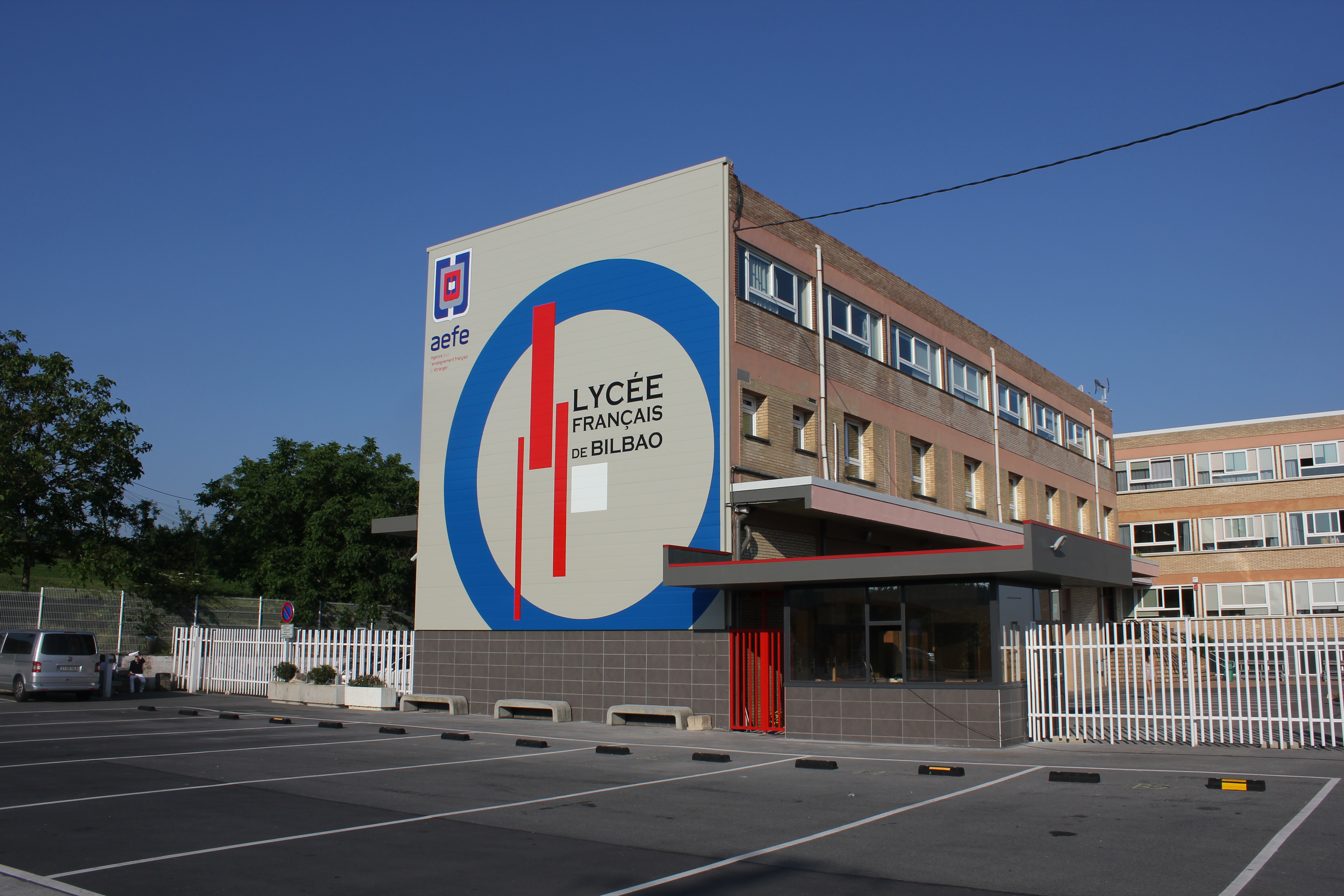
Main entrance of the French School of Bilbao

Lycée Français de Bilbao is a French international school in Zamudio, Biscay, Spain, in the Bilbao metropolitan area. It serves toute petite section through terminale (final year of lycée or senior high school/sixth form).

It opened in 1933 as the Ecoles Françaises de Bilbao/Escuelas Francesas de Bilbao.

== See also ==
- Liceo Español Luis Buñuel, a Spanish international school near Paris, France
