= CD Aurrerá de Vitoria =

Spanish sports club

Coordinates: 42.826916°N 2.645371°W

Aurrerá Vitoria
- Full name: Club Deportivo; Aurrerá de Vitoria
- Nickname: Rojillos
- Founded: 1935
- Ground: Olaranbe, Vitoria, Álava, Spain
- Capacity: 4,000
- President: (Spain) Fernando Urcelay
- Head coach: (Spain) Rubén López
- League: Tercera Federación – Group 4
- 2025–26: Tercera Federación – Group 4, 8th of 18
- Website: www.aurreradevitoria.com
| Home colours | Away colours | Third colours |

Club Deportivo Aurrerá de Vitoria is a Spanish sports club based in Vitoria-Gasteiz, Álava, in the autonomous community of the Basque Country. Founded in 1935 it currently plays in Tercera Federación – Group 4, holding home matches at Estadio Olaranbe, with a 4,000-seat capacity.

It is a partner club of the local professional team Deportivo Alavés. Aurrera's women's team competes in Segunda División.

In addition to the football team, the club has sections of roller hockey, futsal, athletics, archery and inline speed skating.

== Season to season ==
| Season | Tier | Division | Place | Copa del Rey |
|---|---|---|---|---|
| 1965–66 | 4 | 1ª Reg. | 10th | |
| 1966–67 | 4 | 1ª Reg. | 10th | |
| 1967–68 | 4 | 1ª Reg. | 11th | |
| 1968–69 | 5 | 2ª Reg. | 10th | |
| 1969–70 | 5 | 2ª Reg. | 7th | |
| 1970–71 | 5 | 2ª Reg. | 3rd | |
| 1971–72 | 5 | 2ª Reg. | 1st | |
| 1972–73 | 4 | 1ª Reg. | 4th | |
| 1973–74 | 4 | 1ª Reg. | 7th | |
| 1974–75 | 4 | Reg. Pref. | 9th | |
| 1975–76 | 4 | Reg. Pref. | 3rd | |
| 1976–77 | 4 | Reg. Pref. | 10th | |
| 1977–78 | 5 | Reg. Pref. | 16th | |
| 1978–79 | 5 | Reg. Pref. | 7th | |
| 1979–80 | 5 | Reg. Pref. | 19th | |
| 1980–81 | 6 | 1ª Reg. | 1st | |
| 1981–82 | 5 | Reg. Pref. | 9th | |
| 1982–83 | 5 | Reg. Pref. | 16th | |
| 1983–84 | 5 | Reg. Pref. | 18th | |
| 1984–85 | 5 | Reg. Pref. | 6th | |

| Season | Tier | Division | Place | Copa del Rey |
|---|---|---|---|---|
| 1985–86 | 5 | Reg. Pref. | 4th | |
| 1986–87 | 5 | Reg. Pref. | 4th | |
| 1987–88 | 5 | Reg. Pref. | 1st | |
| 1988–89 | 4 | 3ª | 18th | |
| 1989–90 | 5 | Reg. Pref. | 1st | |
| 1990–91 | 4 | 3ª | 17th | |
| 1991–92 | 5 | Reg. Pref. | 2nd | |
| 1992–93 | 5 | Reg. Pref. | 6th | |
| 1993–94 | 4 | 3ª | 2nd | |
| 1994–95 | 4 | 3ª | 1st | |
| 1995–96 | 3 | 2ª B | 9th | First round |
| 1996–97 | 3 | 2ª B | 1st | |
| 1997–98 | 3 | 2ª B | 5th | First round |
| 1998–99 | 3 | 2ª B | 16th | |
| 1999–2000 | 3 | 2ª B | 5th | |
| 2000–01 | 3 | 2ª B | 11th | Round of 64 |
| 2001–02 | 3 | 2ª B | 8th | |
| 2002–03 | 3 | 2ª B | 15th | |
| 2003–04 | 4 | 3ª | 12th | |
| 2004–05 | 4 | 3ª | 17th | |

| Season | Tier | Division | Place | Copa del Rey |
|---|---|---|---|---|
| 2005–06 | 4 | 3ª | 15th | |
| 2006–07 | 5 | Reg. Pref. | 2nd | |
| 2007–08 | 5 | Reg. Pref. | 2nd | |
| 2008–09 | 5 | Reg. Pref. | 3rd | |
| 2009–10 | 5 | Reg. Pref. | 1st | |
| 2010–11 | 4 | 3ª | 20th | |
| 2011–12 | 5 | Reg. Pref. | 1st | |
| 2012–13 | 4 | 3ª | 19th | |
| 2013–14 | 5 | Reg. Pref. | 1st | |
| 2014–15 | 4 | 3ª | 12th | |
| 2015–16 | 4 | 3ª | 18th | |
| 2016–17 | 5 | Reg. Pref. | 1st | |
| 2017–18 | 4 | 3ª | 20th | |
| 2018–19 | 5 | Reg. Pref. | 3rd | |
| 2019–20 | 5 | Reg. Pref. | 3rd | |
| 2020–21 | 5 | Reg. Pref. | 1st | |
| 2021–22 | 6 | Reg. Pref. | 1st | |
| 2022–23 | 5 | 3ª Fed. | 16th | |
| 2023–24 | 6 | Div. Hon. | 2nd | |
| 2024–25 | 6 | Div. Hon. | 1st | Preliminary |

| Season | Tier | Division | Place | Copa del Rey |
|---|---|---|---|---|
| 2025–26 | 5 | 3ª Fed. | 8th | |
| 2026–27 | 5 | 3ª Fed. | | |

- 8 seasons in Segunda División B
- 12 seasons in Tercera División
- 3 seasons in Tercera Federación

== Honours ==
- Segunda División B: (Note: Third tier) 1996–97 (Note: Not promoted in play-offs)
- Tercera División: (Note: Fourth tier) 1994–95 (Note: Promoted in play-offs)
- RFEF Basque tournament: 1994–95, 2002–03

== Notable former players ==
- (Spain) Álvaro
- (Spain) Aritz Aduriz
- (Algeria) Abde Rebbach
