= Iosu Iglesias =

Spanish footballer

Personal information
- Full name: Iosu Iglesias Otxandategi
- Date of birth: 15 December 1976 (age 49)
- Place of birth: Bilbao, Spain
- Height: 1.77 m (5 ft 9 1/2 in)
- Position: Right-back

Youth career
- 1995–1996: SD Arratia

Senior career*
Years	Team	Apps	(Gls)
1995–1997	Arratia		
1998–2000	Amorebieta	68	(12)
2000–2002	Lemona	82	(13)
2002–2005	Barakaldo	103	(12)
2005–2008	Lemona	104	(15)
2008–2011	Real Unión	82	(2)
2011–2012	Lemona	24	(1)
2012–2013	Zamudio	30	(0)
Total		493	(55)
- * Club domestic league appearances and goals

Iosu Iglesias Otxandategi (born 15 December 1976 in Bilbao, Biscay) is a Spanish retired footballer who played as a right-back.
