= Markel Robles =

Spanish footballer

Personal information
- Full name: Markel Robles Zugadi
- Date of birth: 12 June 1979 (age 47)
- Place of birth: Lekeitio, Spain
- Height: 1.94 m (6 ft 4 in)
- Position: Midfielder

Youth career
- 1995–1996: Aurrerá
- 1996–1998: Lekeitio

Senior career*
Years	Team	Apps	(Gls)
1998–2002	Lekeitio		
2002–2004	Eibar B		
2004–2006	Lemona	68	(1)
2006–2007	Real Unión	32	(2)
2007–2009	Eibar	44	(1)
2009–2010	Real Unión	20	(1)
2010–2012	Lemona	53	(5)
2012–2014	Leioa	70	(10)
2014–2015	Arenas Getxo		
Total		287	(20)
- * Club domestic league appearances and goals

Markel Robles Zugadi (born 12 June 1979) is a Spanish former professional footballer who played as a defensive midfielder.
