= Doroteo Elorriaga =

Spanish footballer (1916–2005)

Personal information
- Full name: Doroteo Elorriaga Barrueta
- Date of birth: 22 April 1916
- Place of birth: Sestao, Spain
- Date of death: 25 October 2005 (aged 89)
- Place of death: Barrika, Spain
- Position: Forward

Senior career*
Years	Team	Apps	(Gls)
1932–1934	Sestao SC		
1934–1936	Athletic Bilbao	1	(0)
1939	Deportivo Alavés		
1939–1941	Real Zaragoza	16	(0)
1941–1949	Barakaldo		
- * Club domestic league appearances and goals

Doroteo Elorriaga Barrueta, better known as Doro (22 April 1916 – 25 October 2005), was a Spanish footballer who played as a forward for Athletic Bilbao, Real Zaragoza, and Barakaldo in the 1930s and 1940s.

== Career ==
=== First steps and Bilbao ===
Born in the Biscayan town of Sestao on 22 April 1916, Doro began playing at Kaiku de Abajo, a non-federated team Sestao, and from there he moved to Sestao SC in 1932, aged 16, staying there for two seasons. At the end of the 1933–34 season, Athletic Bilbao signed several players from Sestao SC, including the 18-year-old Doro and Hermenegildo Elices, his brother-in-law.

However, he was ruled out for 18 months after getting sick with pleura. He was able to recover, but just to play one official match for Bilbao, making his debut on 15 March 1936, in a La Liga fixture against Valencia CF, which ended in a 1–1 draw. By playing in this match, Doro was part of the squad that won the 1935–36 La Liga, which was the last before the outbreak of the Spanish Civil War. In 1936, Elorriaga was a member of the squad of Kaiku Chiqui, a non-federated team Sestao, which participated in the 1936 Torneo de las Llanas, an amateur championship organized by Racing de Sestao, helping his side win the title after defeating New Club in the final (1–0). He was still part of the Bilbao squad in the 1936–37 season.

During the Civil War, Elorriaga fought for the Republican side under the Battalion led by Commander Luis Urkullu, which surrendered in Barakaldo to the national forces. After spending four months in the Carmelo prison in Begoña, he joined the Naval, where he briefly played for Deportivo Alavés in the 1938–39 season. After the war, he signed for Zaragoza, then in the First Division. In total, he scored five goals in 26 league matches throughout two seasons, the latter of which ended in relegation.

=== Barakaldo ===
In 1941, Elorriaga joined Barakaldo of the Second Division, staying with them for eight seasons, until 1949, when he retired at the age of 33. On 30 May 1943, he started in a permanence play-off match against Salamanca, scoring his side's second goal to help his side to a 2–0, thus contributing decisively in keeping Barakaldo in the Segunda División. On 30 March 1937, the 31-year-old Doro scored a hat-trick against Málaga to help his side to a 4–2 win.

== Death ==
Elorriaga died in Barrika on 25 October 2005, at the age of 89, and his funeral was held two days later in Barrika.

== Honours ==
Athletic Bilbao

- La Liga: 1935–36
