= SD Lemona =

Spanish football club

Lemona
- Full name: Sociedad Deportiva Lemona
- Founded: 1923; 103 years ago
- Dissolved: July 2012; 14 years ago
- Ground: Arlonagusia, Lemoa, Basque Country, Spain
- Capacity: 5,000
- 2011–12: 2ªB – Group 2, 19th of 20 (relegated)
Home colours	Away colours

Sociedad Deportiva Lemona was a Spanish football team based in Lemoa, in the autonomous community of Basque Country. Founded in 1923, it last played in Segunda División B – Group 2, holding home matches at Estadio Arlonagusia, with a capacity of 5,000 seats.

The club were losing finalists in the Copa Federación de España in the 2010–11 and 2011–12 seasons.

Lemona was disbanded in July 2012 due to financial problems.

== Season to season ==
Season	Tier	Division	Place	Copa del Rey
1928–29	7	3ª Reg. P.	4th	
1929–30	6	2ª Reg.	3rd	
1930–31	6	2ª Reg.	1st	
1931–32	6	2ª Reg.	1st	
1932–33	6	2ª Reg.	6th	
1933–34	6	2ª Reg.	1st	
1934–35	5	2ª Reg. P.	8th	
1935–36	5	2ª Reg. P.	1st	
1939–40	6	2ª Reg.	2nd	
1940–41	6	2ª Reg.	1st	
1941–42	4	1ª Reg. B	3rd	
1942–43	4	1ª Reg. B	5th	
1943–44	4	1ª Reg.	5th	
1944–45	4	1ª Reg.	5th	
1945–46	4	1ª Reg.	4th	
1946–47	4	1ª Reg.	8th	
1947–48	4	1ª Reg.	4th	
1948–49	4	1ª Reg.	12th	
1949–50	5	2ª Reg.	2nd	
1950–51	5	2ª Reg.	5th	

Season	Tier	Division	Place	Copa del Rey
1951–52	5	2ª Reg.	8th	
1952–53	5	2ª Reg.	2nd	
1953–54	4	1ª Reg.	9th	
1954–55	4	1ª Reg.	5th	
1955–56	4	1ª Reg.	6th	
1956–57	4	1ª Reg.	9th	
1957–58	4	1ª Reg.	11th	
1958–59	4	1ª Reg.	2nd	
1959–60	4	1ª Reg.	5th	
1960–61	4	1ª Reg.	2nd	
1961–62	4	1ª Reg.	7th	
1962–63	4	1ª Reg.	12th	
1963–64	4	1ª Reg.	11th	
1964–65	4	1ª Reg.	9th	
1965–66	4	1ª Reg.	8th	
1966–67	4	1ª Reg.	12th	
1967–68	4	1ª Reg.	13th	
1968–69	5	1ª Reg.	2nd	
1969–70	4	Reg. Pref.	13th	
1970–71	5	1ª Reg.	5th	

Season	Tier	Division	Place	Copa del Rey
1971–72	4	Reg. Pref.	19th	
1972–73	5	1ª Reg.	1st	
1973–74	4	Reg. Pref.	17th	
1974–75	5	1ª Reg.	2nd	
1975–76	4	Reg. Pref.	12th	
1976–77	4	Reg. Pref.	2nd	
1977–78	4	3ª	7th	
1978–79	4	3ª	13th	First round
1979–80	4	3ª	20th	First round
1980–81	4	3ª	18th	
1981–82	4	3ª	7th	
1982–83	4	3ª	13th	
1983–84	4	3ª	10th	
1984–85	4	3ª	18th	
1985–86	5	Reg. Pref.	1st	
1986–87	4	3ª	3rd	
1987–88	3	2ª B	7th	First round
1988–89	3	2ª B	15th	Second round
1989–90	3	2ª B	7th	
1990–91	3	2ª B	6th	Second round

Season	Tier	Division	Place	Copa del Rey
1991–92	3	2ª B	15th	First round
1992–93	3	2ª B	14th	Second round
1993–94	3	2ª B	10th	Third round
1994–95	3	2ª B	8th	
1995–96	3	2ª B	14th	
1996–97	3	2ª B	4th	
1997–98	3	2ª B	9th	First round
1998–99	3	2ª B	18th	
1999–2000	4	3ª	2nd	
2000–01	4	3ª	1st	Preliminary
2001–02	4	3ª	1st	Round of 64
2002–03	4	3ª	4th	Round of 64
2003–04	4	3ª	2nd	
2004–05	3	2ªB	8th	
2005–06	3	2ª B	9th	Second round
2006–07	3	2ª B	8th	
2007–08	3	2ª B	7th	First round
2008–09	3	2ª B	6th	Second round
2009–10	3	2ª B	6th	First round
2010–11	3	2ª B	10th	

Season	Tier	Division	Place	Copa del Rey
2011–12	3	2ª B	19th	

- 20 seasons in Segunda División B
- 14 seasons in Tercera División

== Honours ==
- Tercera División: (Note: Fourth tier) 2000–01, (Note: Not promoted in play-offs) 2001–02 (Note: Not promoted in play-offs)
- RFEF Basque tournament: 1995–96, 1996–97, 1999–2000, 2010–11, 2011–12

== Notable former players ==
- (Equatorial Guinea) (Spain) Juan Cuyami
- (Mexico) (Spain) Javier Iturriaga
- (Spain) Iosu Iglesias
- (Spain) Markel Robles
- (Spain) Zigor Goikuria
- (Spain) Álvaro Martínez
- (Spain) Gaizka Toquero

== Notable former coaches ==
- (Spain) Iñigo Liceranzu
- (Spain) Aitor Larrazábal
