= Barakaldo CF =

Barakaldo
- Full name: Barakaldo Club de Fútbol
- Nicknames: Peñarol; Fabriles; Baraka
- Founded: 1917; 109 years ago
- Ground: Lasesarre, Barakaldo, Basque Country, Spain
- Capacity: 7,960
- President: Ricardo Arana
- Head coach: Imanol de la Sota
- League: Primera Federación – Group 1
- 2025–26: Primera Federación – Group 1, 7th of 20
- Website: www.barakaldocf.com
Home colours	Away colours

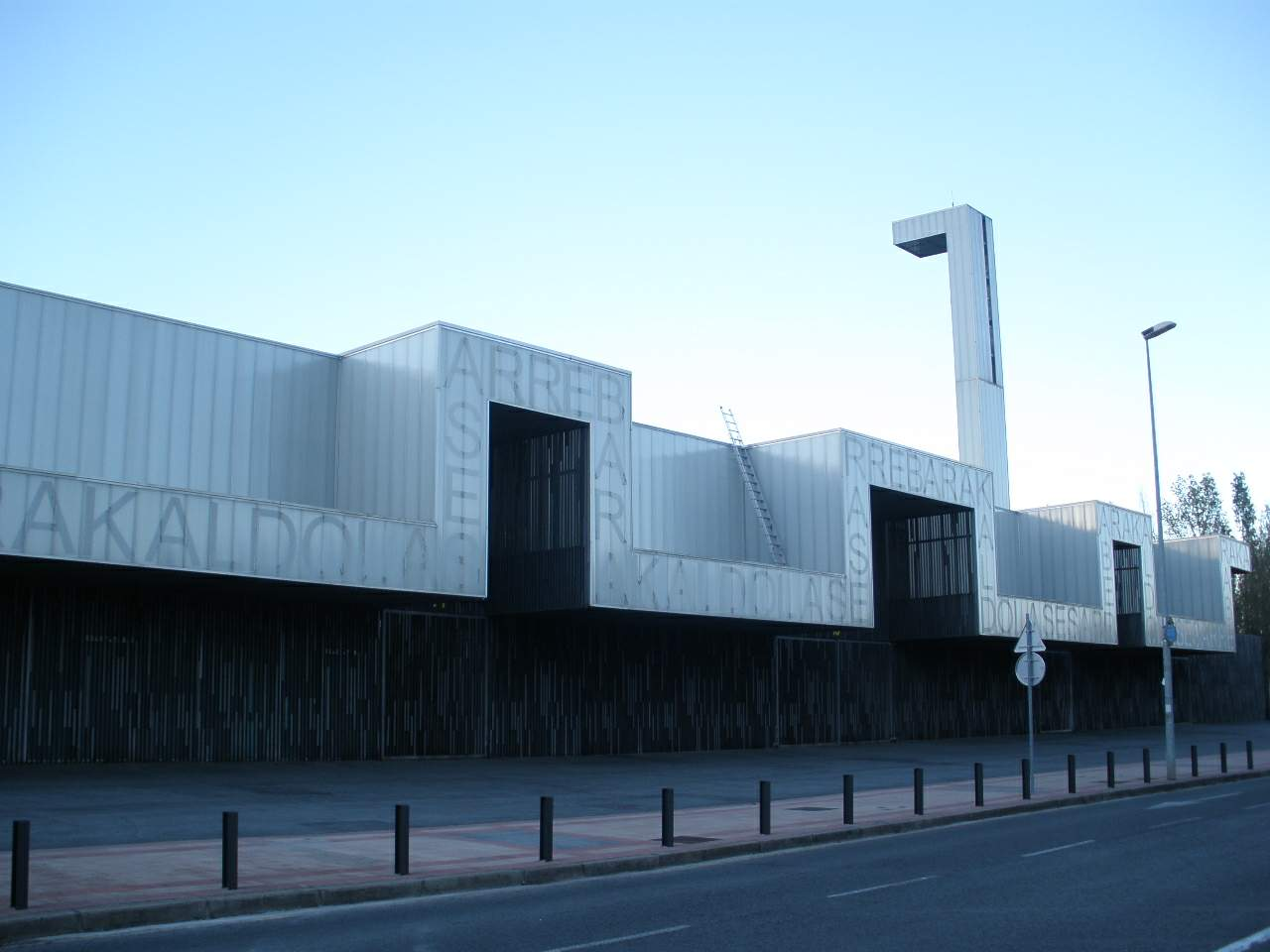
Estadio de Lasesarre

Barakaldo Club de Fútbol is a Basque football team based in Barakaldo, in the autonomous community of the Basque Country. Founded in 1917 it plays in Primera Federación – Group 1, holding home stadium is Lasesarre, with a 7,960 Seat Capacity.

== History ==
Barakaldo played the 1918–19 season in the Category C of the Regional Championship and became the champion without losing a single game throughout the season, promoted to category B.

Barakaldo lost its place in the second category in the 1944–45 season, but in the 1945–46 season the club returned to the Segunda División. Nevertheless, the next 1946–47 season was not successful for the club. It finished in the 11th position among 14 teams, just one point away from the last position. In the following campaign Barakaldo improved its position, finishing 9th.

== Club names ==
- Baracaldo Football-Club – (1917–1942)
- Baracaldo Oriamendi – (1940–43)
- Baracaldo Altos Hornos – (1943–71)

== Season to season ==
Season	Tier	Division	Place	Copa del Rey
1929	3	3ª	9th	
1929–30	3	3ª	1st	
1930–31	3	3ª	1st	
1931–32	3	3ª	2nd	
1932–33	3	3ª	2nd	Round of 32
1933–34	3	3ª	2nd	Round of 32
1934–35	2	2ª	6th	Fifth round
1935–36	2	2ª	3rd	Third round
1939–40	2	2ª	5th	Semi-finals
1940–41	2	2ª	11th	First round
1941–42	2	2ª	6th	Third round
1942–43	2	2ª	5th	First round
1943–44	2	2ª	11th	Round of 32
1944–45	2	2ª	14th	Round of 16
1945–46	3	3ª	3rd	
1946–47	2	2ª	11th	First round
1947–48	2	2ª	9th	Sixth round
1948–49	2	2ª	5th	Fifth round
1949–50	2	2ª	10th	Third round
1950–51	2	2ª	12th	

Season	Tier	Division	Place	Copa del Rey
1951–52	2	2ª	5th	
1952–53	2	2ª	7th	Quarterfinals
1953–54	2	2ª	2nd	
1954–55	2	2ª	6th	
1955–56	2	2ª	10th	
1956–57	2	2ª	18th	
1957–58	3	3ª	1st	
1958–59	2	2ª	6th	Preliminary
1959–60	2	2ª	9th	Round of 32
1960–61	2	2ª	15th	Round of 32
1961–62	3	3ª	9th	
1962–63	3	3ª	1st	
1963–64	3	3ª	1st	
1964–65	2	2ª	9th	Round of 32
1965–66	2	2ª	16th	Preliminary
1966–67	3	3ª	3rd	
1967–68	3	3ª	2nd	
1968–69	3	3ª	7th	
1969–70	3	3ª	5th	Fourth round
1970–71	3	3ª	4th	Round of 32

Season	Tier	Division	Place	Copa del Rey
1971–72	3	3ª	1st	Second round
1972–73	2	2ª	8th	Fifth round
1973–74	2	2ª	10th	Fourth round
1974–75	2	2ª	15th	Fourth round
1975–76	3	3ª	2nd	Third round
1976–77	3	3ª	1st	First round
1977–78	2	2ª	4th	First round
1978–79	2	2ª	19th	Third round
1979–80	3	2ª B	1st	Second round
1980–81	2	2ª	19th	Third round
1981–82	3	2ª B	6th	Second round
1982–83	3	2ª B	14th	First round
1983–84	3	2ª B	18th	
1984–85	4	3ª	4th	
1985–86	4	3ª	2nd	Third round
1986–87	4	3ª	4th	Second round
1987–88	4	3ª	1st	Second round
1988–89	3	2ª B	2nd	
1989–90	3	2ª B	10th	
1990–91	3	2ª B	7th	Third round

Season	Tier	Division	Place	Copa del Rey
1991–92	3	2ª B	7th	Third round
1992–93	3	2ª B	2nd	Fourth round
1993–94	3	2ª B	4th	First round
1994–95	3	2ª B	13th	First round
1995–96	3	2ª B	7th	
1996–97	3	2ª B	3rd	First round
1997–98	3	2ª B	1st	First round
1998–99	3	2ª B	3rd	Second round
1999–2000	3	2ª B	4th	Second round
2000–01	3	2ª B	12th	First round
2001–02	3	2ª B	1st	
2002–03	3	2ª B	2nd	First round
2003–04	3	2ª B	14th	Second round
2004–05	3	2ª B	7th	
2005–06	3	2ª B	15th	Preliminary
2006–07	3	2ª B	6th	
2007–08	3	2ª B	4th	Second round
2008–09	3	2ª B	10th	Third round
2009–10	3	2ª B	11th	
2010–11	3	2ª B	20th	

Season	Tier	Division	Place	Copa del Rey
2011–12	4	3ª	2nd	
2012–13	3	2ª B	5th	
2013–14	3	2ª B	8th	Second round
2014–15	3	2ª B	7th	Third round
2015–16	3	2ª B	2nd	Round of 32
2016–17	3	2ª B	13th	Second round
2017–18	3	2ª B	6th	
2018–19	3	2ª B	4th	First round
2019–20	3	2ª B	14th	Second round
2020–21	3	2ª B	10th / 7th	
2021–22	5	3ª RFEF	4th	
2022–23	5	3ª Fed.	1st	
2023–24	4	2ª Fed.	2nd	First round
2024–25	3	1ª Fed.	11th	Second round
2025–26	3	1ª Fed.	7th	
2026–27	3	1ª Fed.		TBD

- 30 seasons in Segunda División
- 3 seasons in Primera Federación
- 36 seasons in Segunda División B
- 1 season in Segunda Federación
- 24 seasons in Tercera División
- 2 seasons in Tercera Federación/Tercera División RFEF

== Current squad ==
As of 4 November 2026

Note: Flags indicate national team as defined under FIFA eligibility rules; some limited exceptions apply. Players may hold more than one non-FIFA nationality.

No.	Pos.	Nation	Player
1	GK	ESP	Ibon Ispizua
2	DF	ESP	Sergio Camus
3	DF	ESP	Ander Zoilo
4	DF	ESP	Óscar Marotías
5	DF	ESP	Aritz Muguruza
6	MF	ESP	Unai Naveira
7	FW	ESP	Jon Cabo
8	MF	ESP	Julen Huidobro
9	FW	ESP	Xavi Sola
10	MF	ESP	Álvaro Peña
11	FW	ESP	Carlos Mattheus
13	GK	ESP	Gaizka Campos

No.	Pos.	Nation	Player
14	FW	ESP	Urko Collado
15	MF	ESP	Iván Castillo
17	DF	ESP	Pablo Trigueros
18	DF	ESP	Beñat Gómez
19	FW	ESP	Ángel Troncho
20	FW	ESP	Okolo
21	MF	ESP	Xemi Fernández
22	DF	ESP	Samu Calera
23	DF	ESP	Ander Sustatxa
26	MF	ESP	Markel Ruiz
27	FW	ESP	Endika Mateos (on loan from Eibar)

=== Reserve team ===
Note: Flags indicate national team as defined under FIFA eligibility rules; some limited exceptions apply. Players may hold more than one non-FIFA nationality.

No.	Pos.	Nation	Player
28	MF	ESP	Aitzol Urueña
30	MF	ESP	Xabi Sanz

== Honours ==
- Segunda División B (Note: Third tier)
  - Champions (3): 1979–80, (Note: Promoted directly) 1997–98, (Note: Not promoted in play-offs) 2001–02 (Note: Not promoted in play-offs)
- Tercera División
  - Winners (7): (Note: Third tier) 1929–30 (Note: Not promoted in play-offs) 1930–31 (Note: Not promoted in play-offs) 1957–58, (Note: Promoted in play-offs) 1962–63, (Note: Not promoted in play-offs) 1963–64, (Note: Promoted in play-offs) 1971–72, (Note: Promoted directly) 1976–77 (Note: Promoted directly)
  - Winners (1) (Note: Fourth tier) 1987–88 (Note: Promoted directly)

== Famous players ==
Note: this list includes players that have played in at least 100 league games and/or have reached international status.

- (Spain) Serafín Aedo
- (Spain) Pablito Barcos
- (Spain) Bata
- (Spain) Doroteo Elorriaga
- (Spain) Germán Beltrán
- (Spain) Luis María Echeberría
- (Spain) Javier Escalza
- (Spain) Raúl García
- (Spain) Guillermo Gorostiza
- (Spain) Iosu Iglesias
- (Spain) Venancio
- (Spain) Manuel Sarabia
- (Spain) Telmo Zarra

== Famous coaches ==
- (Spain) José María Amorrortu
- (Spain) Carmelo Cedrun
- (Spain) Iñigo Liceranzu
- (Spain) Mané
- (Spain) Eusebio Ríos

== Stadium ==
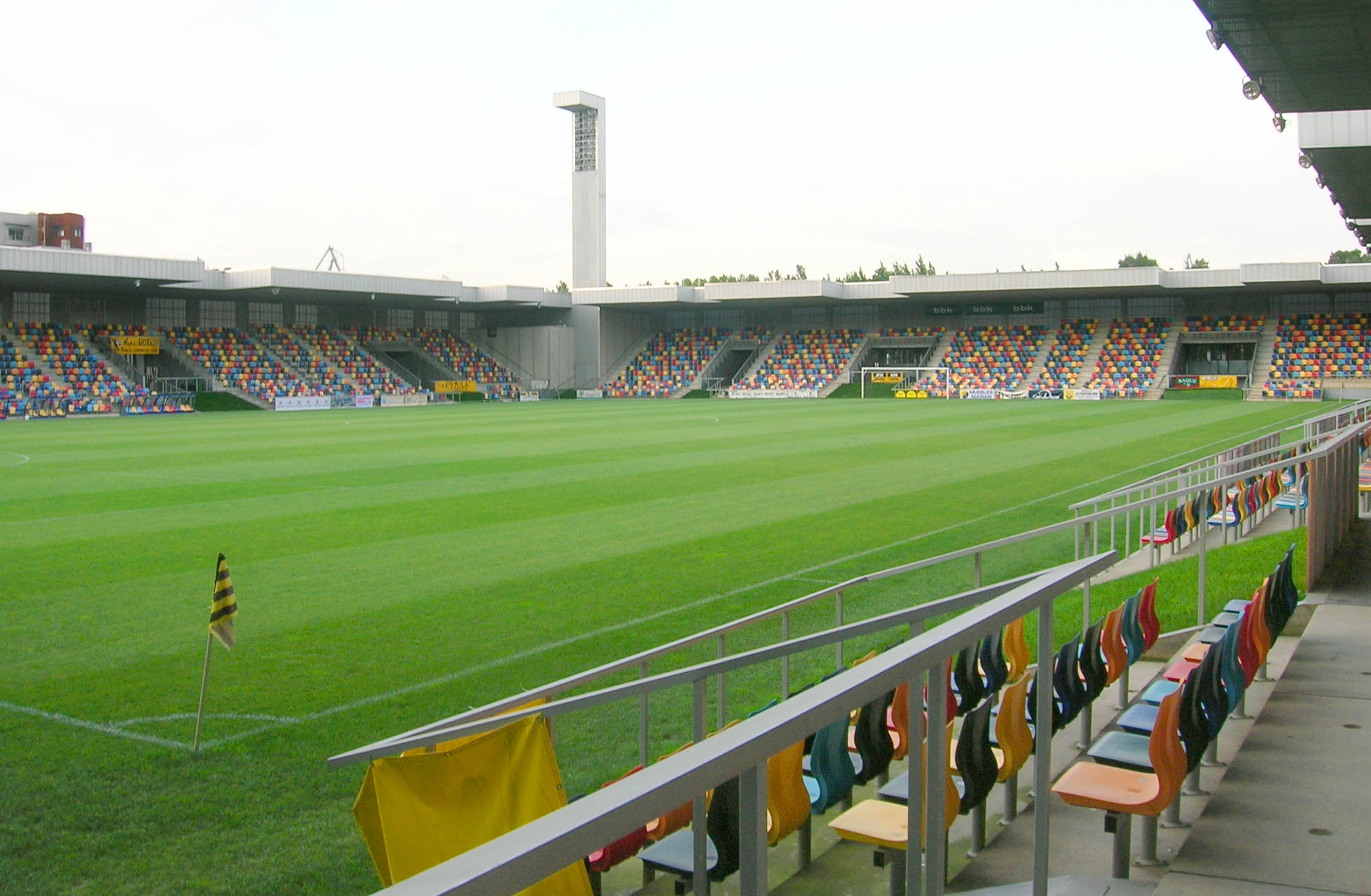
Campo de Lasesarre
