= Zamudio =

- Municipality
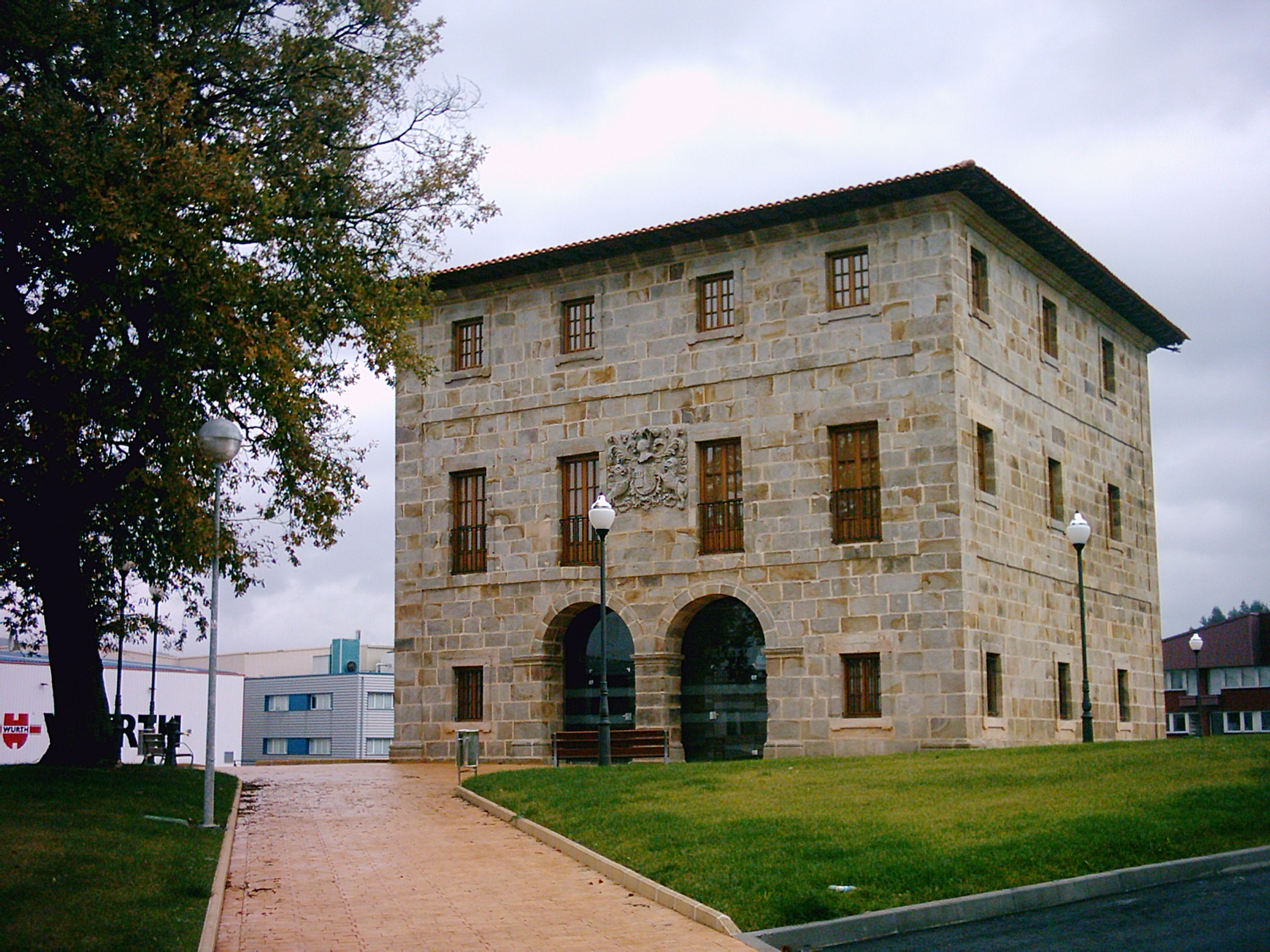

- Flag Coat of arms

- Location of Zamudio within the Basque Country Zamudio (Spain)
- Coordinates: 43°16′58″N 2°51′45″W
- Country: Spain
- Autonomous community: Basque Country
- Province: Biscay
- Comarca: Greater Bilbao
- Founded: c. 930

Government
  - Mayor: Igotz López (EAJ-PNV)

Area
  - Total: 19.63 km^{2} (7.58 sq mi)
- Elevation: 50 m (160 ft)

Population (2025-01-01)
  - Total: 3,442
  - Density: 175.3/km^{2} (454.1/sq mi)
- Demonym: Basque: zamudioztarra
- Time zone: UTC+1 (CET)
  - Summer (DST): UTC+2 (CEST)
- Postal code: 48170
- Official language(s): Basque; Spanish
- Website: Official website

Zamudio is a town and municipality located in the province of Biscay, in the Autonomous Community of Basque Country, northern Spain.

Lycée Français de Bilbao, the French international school of the Bilbao metropolitan area, is in Zamudio.
