= 1999 Tercera División play-offs =

Spanish football league play-offs

The 1999 Tercera División play-offs to Segunda División B from Tercera División (Promotion play-offs) were the final playoffs for the promotion from 1998–99 Tercera División to 1999–2000 Segunda División B. The first four teams in each group (excluding reserve teams) took part in the play-off.

== Format ==
The 68 participating teams were divided into 5 series each made up of 4 groups in the category, with the exception of Series E , which was only formed by Group XII . Each series was divided into 4 groups formed by a 1st, a 2nd, a 3rd and a 4th classified from each group, which played a double-round playoff. Each victory was equivalent to 3 points, the tie to 1 point and the defeat to 0 points. The champion of each group obtained the promotion to Second Division B.

The distribution of each series was as follows:

Series A:

- Group I – Galicia (Galicia (Spain))
- Group II – Asturias
- Group VII – Community of Madrid
- Group VIII – Castile and León

Series B:

- Group III – Cantabria
- Group IV – Basque Country (Basque Country (autonomous community))
- Group XV – La Rioja and Navarre
- Group XVI – Aragon

Series C:

- Group V – Catalonia
- Group VI – Valencian Community
- Group XI – Balearic Islands
- Gruoup XIII – Region of Murcia

Series D:

- Group IX – Eastern Andalusia and Melilla
- Group X – Western Andalusia and Ceuta
- Group XIV – Extremadura
- Group XVII – Castilla–La Mancha

Series E:

- Group XII – Canary Islands

== Teams for 1998–99 play-offs ==
Group I – Galicia (Galicia (Spain))	Group II – Asturias	Group III – Cantabria	Group IV – Basque Country (Basque Country (autonomous community))	Group V – Catalonia
1st Porriño Industrial FC	1st Club Marino de Luanco	1st Racing de Santander B	1st Real Sociedad B	1st AEC Manlleu
2nd RC Celta de Vigo B	2nd Club Siero	2nd UM Escobedo	2nd Deportivo Alavés B	2nd CE Premià
3rd CCD Cerceda	3rd Navia CF	3rd Ribamontán al Mar CF	3rd Real Unión de Irún	3rd CE Europa
4th Viveiro CF	4th Real Titánico	4th CD Bezana	4th Zalla UC	4th CE Mataró

Group VI – Valencian Community	Group VII – Community of Madrid	Group VIII – Castile and León	Group IX – E. Andalusia and Melilla	Group X – W. Andalusia and Ceuta
1st Elche CF B	1st Real Madrid C	1st Zamora CF	1st Málaga CF B	1st RB Linense
2nd Novelda CF	2nd CD Leganés B	2nd SD Gimnástica Segoviana	2nd CP Ejido	2nd Dos Hermanas CF
3rd CD Alcoyano	3rd CD Coslada	3rd SD Ponferradina	3rd Guadix CF	3rd Coria CF
4th UD Alzira	4th CP Amorós	4th Real Ávila CF	4th UD Maracena	4th CD San Fernando

Group XI – Balearic Islands	Group XII – Canary Islands	Group XIII – Region of Murcia	Group XIV – Extremadura	Group XV – Navarre and La Rioja
1st CD Constancia	1st UD Las Palmas B	1st Orihuela CF	1st CD Grabasa Burguillos	1st Peña Sport FC
2nd UD Poblense	2nd UD Orotava	2nd Lorca CF	2nd SP Villafranca	2nd CD Azcoyen
3rd CD Ferriolense	3rd UD Lanzarote	3rd AD Mar Menor	3rd CD Don Benito	3rd CD Izarra
4th CD Atlético Baleares	4th UD Telde	4th UD Horadada	4th Mérida Promesas UD	4th CD Logroñés B

Group XVI – Aragon	Group XVII – Castilla–La Mancha
1st CD Endesa Andorra	1st Tomelloso CF
2nd UD Casetas	2nd CD Guadalajara
3rd CF Figueruelas	3rd Hellín Deportivo
4th UD Barbastro	4th Albacete Balompié B

== Tables and Results ==
=== Group A-1 ===
Pos	Team	Pld	W	D	L	GF	GA	GD	Pts	Qualification or relegation
1	(Castile and León) Real Ávila CF (substituted on)	6	4	0	2	14	10	+4	12	Promoted to Segunda División B
2	(Community of Madrid) Real Madrid C	6	3	1	2	13	10	+3	10	
3	(Galicia (Spain)) RC Celta de Vigo B	6	2	1	3	6	6	0	7	
4	(Asturias) Navia CF	6	2	0	4	6	13	−7	6	

Source: Fútbol Regional

Home \ Away	AVI	CEL	NAV	RMC
Real Ávila CF	—	3–2	3–1	3–1
RC Celta B	2–0	—	0–1	0–1
Navia CF	2–1	0–1	—	1–3
Real Madrid C	2–4	1–1	5–1	—

Updated to match(es) played on completed. Source: FutbolMe
Legend: Blue = home team win; Yellow = draw; Red = away team win.

=== Group A-2 ===
Pos	Team	Pld	W	D	L	GF	GA	GD	Pts	Qualification or relegation
1	(Castile and León) SD Ponferradina (substituted on)	6	5	1	0	12	4	+8	16	Promoted to Segunda División B
2	(Community of Madrid) CD Leganés B	6	2	3	1	8	4	+4	9	
3	(Galicia (Spain)) Porriño Industrial CF	6	1	3	2	3	4	−1	6	
4	(Asturias) Real Titánico	6	0	1	5	4	15	−11	1	

Source: Fútbol Regional

Home \ Away	LEG	PON	PRI	TIT
CD Leganés B	—	0–0	0–0	6–1
SD Ponferradina	3–1	—	2–1	3–1
Porriño Industrial CF	0–0	0–1	—	2–1
Real Titánico	0–1	1–3	0–0	—

Updated to match(es) played on completed. Source: FutbolMe
Legend: Blue = home team win; Yellow = draw; Red = away team win.

=== Group A-3 ===
Pos	Team	Pld	W	D	L	GF	GA	GD	Pts	Qualification or relegation
1	(Castile and León) SD Gimnástica Segoviana (substituted on)	6	4	2	0	13	7	+6	14	Promoted to Segunda División B
2	(Community of Madrid) CP Amorós	6	2	3	1	11	7	+4	9	
3	(Asturias) Club Marino de Luanco	6	2	1	3	7	12	−5	7	
4	(Galicia (Spain)) CCD Cerceda	6	0	2	4	4	9	−5	2	

Source: Fútbol Regional

Home \ Away	AMO	CER	GSV	MAR
CP Amorós	—	2–0	2–3	3–0
CCD Cerceda	1–1	—	1–1	0–1
SD Gimnástica Segoviana	1–0	2–1	—	4–1
Marino de Luanco	2–2	2–1	1–2	—

Updated to match(es) played on completed. Source: FutbolMe
Legend: Blue = home team win; Yellow = draw; Red = away team win.

=== Group A-4 ===
Pos	Team	Pld	W	D	L	GF	GA	GD	Pts	Qualification or relegation
1	(Castile and León) Zamora CF (substituted on)	6	4	1	1	11	6	+5	13	Promoted to Segunda División B
2	(Asturias) Club Siero	6	4	0	2	9	6	+3	12	
3	(Community of Madrid) CD Coslada	6	2	0	4	9	10	−1	6	
4	(Galicia (Spain)) Viveiro CF	6	1	1	4	4	11	−7	4	

Source: Fútbol Regional

Home \ Away	COS	SIE	VIV	ZAM
CD Coslada	—	2–0	3–0	2–3
Club Siero	2–0	—	1–0	3–0
Viveiro CF	3–2	0–3	—	1–2
Zamora CF	2–0	4–0	0–0	—

Updated to match(es) played on completed. Source: FutbolMe
Legend: Blue = home team win; Yellow = draw; Red = away team win.

=== Group B-1 ===
Pos	Team	Pld	W	D	L	GF	GA	GD	Pts	Qualification or relegation
1	(Aragon) CF Figueruelas (substituted on)	6	3	2	1	8	4	+4	11	Promoted to Segunda División B
2	(Cantabria) Racing de Santander B	6	3	1	2	8	4	+4	10	
3	(Basque Country (autonomous community)) Zalla UC	6	2	2	2	4	4	0	8	
4	(Navarre) CD Azcoyen	6	1	1	4	3	11	−8	4	

Source: Fútbol Regional

Home \ Away	AZC	FIG	RAC	ZAL
CD Azcoyen	—	0–2	1–3	0–0
CF Figueruelas	3–1	—	0–2	1–1
Racing de Santander B	3–0	0–0	—	0–1
Zalla UC	0–1	0–2	2–0	—

Updated to match(es) played on completed. Source: FutbolMe
Legend: Blue = home team win; Yellow = draw; Red = away team win.

=== Group B-2 ===
Pos	Team	Pld	W	D	L	GF	GA	GD	Pts	Qualification or relegation
1	(Navarre) CD Izarra (substituted on)	6	3	2	1	10	4	+6	11	Promoted to Segunda División B
2	(Basque Country (autonomous community)) Real Sociedad B	6	3	1	2	9	7	+2	10	
3	(Cantabria) UM Escobedo	6	2	1	3	6	7	−1	7	
4	(Aragon) UD Barbastro	6	1	2	3	6	13	−7	5	

Source: Fútbol Regional

Home \ Away	BBS	ESC	IZA	RSO
UD Barbastro	—	3–1	0–0	1–4
UM Escobedo	2–0	—	0–0	0–1
CD Izarra	5–1	1–0	—	3–0
Real Sociedad B	1–1	1–2	2–0	—

Updated to match(es) played on completed. Source: FutbolMe
Legend: Blue = home team win; Yellow = draw; Red = away team win.

=== Group B-3 ===
Pos	Team	Pld	W	D	L	GF	GA	GD	Pts	Qualification or relegation
1	(Basque Country (autonomous community)) Deportivo Alavés B (substituted on)	6	5	0	1	10	4	+6	15	Promoted to Segunda División B
2	(Cantabria) Ribamontán al Mar CF	6	3	0	3	8	11	−3	9	
3	(Aragon) CD Endesa Andorra	6	2	0	4	10	11	−1	6	
4	(La Rioja) CD Logroñés B	6	2	0	4	6	8	−2	6	

Source: Fútbol Regional

Home \ Away	ALV	EAN	LOG	RBM
Deportivo Alavés B	—	2–1	1–0	4–2
CD Endesa Andorra	0–2	—	3–4	1–2
CD Logroñés B	1–0	0–1	—	2–1
Ribamontán al Mar CF	0–1	1–4	1–0	—

Updated to match(es) played on completed. Source: FutbolMe
Legend: Blue = home team win; Yellow = draw; Red = away team win.

=== Group B-4 ===
Pos	Team	Pld	W	D	L	GF	GA	GD	Pts	Qualification or relegation
1	(Basque Country (autonomous community)) Real Unión de Irún (substituted on)	6	4	2	0	10	3	+7	14	Promoted to Segunda División B
2	(Aragon) UD Casetas	6	3	2	1	10	7	+3	11	
3	(Navarre) Peña Sport FC	6	1	2	3	7	10	−3	5	
4	(Cantabria) CD Bezana	6	1	0	5	4	11	−7	3	

Source: Fútbol Regional

Home \ Away	BEZ	CST	PÑS	RUN
CD Bezana	—	1–4	0–2	1–2
UD Casetas	1–0	—	3–3	0–2
Peña Sport FC	1–2	0–1	—	1–1
Real Unión	1–0	1–1	3–0	—

Updated to match(es) played on completed. Source: FutbolMe
Legend: Blue = home team win; Yellow = draw; Red = away team win.

=== Group C-1 ===
Pos	Team	Pld	W	D	L	GF	GA	GD	Pts	Qualification or relegation
1	(Region of Murcia) Lorca CF (substituted on)	6	4	1	1	14	3	+11	13	Promoted to Segunda División B
2	(Catalonia) AEC Manlleu	6	4	0	2	13	11	+2	12	
3	(Valencian Community) CD Alcoyano	6	2	2	2	5	5	0	8	
4	(Balearic Islands) CD Atlético Baleares	6	0	1	5	8	21	−13	1	

Source: Fútbol Regional

Home \ Away	ALC	BAL	LOR	MNL
CD Alcoyano	—	2–1	0–0	1–0
CD Atlético Baleares	1–1	—	0–3	3–4
Lorca CF	1–0	6–1	—	4–0
AEC Manlleu	2–1	5–2	2–0	—

Updated to match(es) played on completed. Source: FutbolMe
Legend: Blue = home team win; Yellow = draw; Red = away team win.

=== Group C-2 ===
Pos	Team	Pld	W	D	L	GF	GA	GD	Pts	Qualification or relegation
1	(Catalonia) CE Premià (substituted on)	6	4	1	1	15	6	+9	13	Promoted to Segunda División B
2	(Valencian Community) UD Horadada	6	3	2	1	13	9	+4	11	
3	(Valencian Community) Elche CF B	6	2	1	3	7	12	−5	7	
4	(Balearic Islands) CD Ferriolense	6	0	2	4	7	15	−8	2	

Source: Fútbol Regional

Home \ Away	ELC	FRL	HOR	PRE
Elche CF B	—	1–0	0–2	1–4
CD Ferriolense	1–3	—	3–5	1–4
UD Horadada	2–2	1–1	—	2–1
CE Premià	3–0	1–1	2–1	—

Updated to match(es) played on completed. Source: FutbolMe
Legend: Blue = home team win; Yellow = draw; Red = away team win.

=== Group C-3 ===
Pos	Team	Pld	W	D	L	GF	GA	GD	Pts	Qualification or relegation
1	(Valencian Community) UD Alzira (substituted on)	6	4	1	1	15	9	+6	13	Promoted to Segunda División B
2	(Valencian Community) Orihuela CF	6	2	4	0	14	7	+7	10	
3	(Catalonia) CE Europa	6	1	2	3	8	14	−6	5	
4	(Balearic Islands) UD Poblense	6	0	3	3	9	16	−7	3	

Source: Fútbol Regional

Home \ Away	ALZ	EUR	ORI	POB
UD Alzira	—	4–0	0–0	4–2
CE Europa	1–3	—	1–1	1–1
Orihuela CF	6–1	3–1	—	3–3
UD Poblense	0–3	2–4	1–1	—

Updated to match(es) played on completed. Source: FutbolMe
Legend: Blue = home team win; Yellow = draw; Red = away team win.

=== Group C-4 ===
Pos	Team	Pld	W	D	L	GF	GA	GD	Pts	Qualification or relegation
1	(Valencian Community) Novelda CF (substituted on)	6	4	0	2	7	4	+3	12	Promoted to Segunda División B
2	(Region of Murcia) AD Mar Menor	6	3	0	3	7	5	+2	9	
3	(Catalonia) CE Mataró	6	3	0	3	9	9	0	9	
4	(Balearic Islands) CD Constancia	6	2	0	4	5	10	−5	6	

Source: Fútbol Regional

Home \ Away	CON	MMN	MAT	NOV
CD Constancia	—	1–0	1–0	1–2
AD Mar Menor	3–0	—	2–0	1–0
CE Mataró	4–2	3–1	—	1–0
Novelda CF	1–0	1–0	3–1	—

Updated to match(es) played on completed. Source: FutbolMe
Legend: Blue = home team win; Yellow = draw; Red = away team win.

=== Group D-1 ===
Pos	Team	Pld	W	D	L	GF	GA	GD	Pts	Qualification or relegation
1	(Andalusia) Dos Hermanas CF (substituted on)	6	5	1	0	10	3	+7	16	Promoted to Segunda División B
2	(Andalusia) Málaga CF B	6	2	2	2	9	9	0	8	
3	(Extremadura) CD Don Benito	6	2	1	3	8	9	−1	7	
4	(Castilla–La Mancha) Albacete Balompié B	6	1	0	5	5	11	−6	3	

Source: Fútbol Regional

Home \ Away	ALB	DBE	DOS	MGA
Albacete Balompié B	—	0–2	0–1	1–2
CD Don Benito	4–2	—	0–2	1–1
Dos Hermanas CF	2–0	1–0	—	2–2
Málaga CF B	0–2	3–1	1–2	—

Updated to match(es) played on completed. Source: FutbolMe
Legend: Blue = home team win; Yellow = draw; Red = away team win.

=== Group D-2 ===
Pos	Team	Pld	W	D	L	GF	GA	GD	Pts	Qualification or relegation
1	(Andalusia) Coria CF (substituted on)	6	4	2	0	11	3	+8	14	Promoted to Segunda División B
2	(Andalusia) CP Ejido	6	4	1	1	10	5	+5	13	
3	(Castilla–La Mancha) Tomelloso CF	6	2	1	3	7	9	−2	7	
4	(Extremadura) UD Mérida Promesas	6	0	0	6	4	15	−11	0	

Source: Fútbol Regional

Home \ Away	COR	EJI	MEP	TOM
Coria CF	—	2–0	2–1	1–1
CP Ejido	1–1	—	3–1	2–0
UD Mérida Promesas	0–4	0–1	—	0–1
Tomelloso CF	0–1	1–3	4–1	—

Updated to match(es) played on completed. Source: FutbolMe
Legend: Blue = home team win; Yellow = draw; Red = away team win.

=== Group D-3 ===
Pos	Team	Pld	W	D	L	GF	GA	GD	Pts	Qualification or relegation
1	(Andalusia) Guadix CF (substituted on)	6	4	1	1	11	4	+7	13	Promoted to Segunda División B
2	(Andalusia) CD San Fernando	6	4	1	1	12	6	+6	13	
3	(Castilla–La Mancha) CD Guadalajara	6	1	2	3	6	10	−4	5	
4	(Extremadura) CD Grabasa Burguillos	6	1	0	5	6	15	−9	3	

Source: Fútbol Regional

Home \ Away	GDL	GDX	GRB	SFE
CD Guadalajara	—	0–0	1–2	1–2
Guadix CF	3–0	—	2–1	1–0
CD Grabasa Burguillos	1–2	1–4	—	1–5
CD San Fernando	2–2	2–1	1–0	—

Updated to match(es) played on completed. Source: FutbolMe
Legend: Blue = home team win; Yellow = draw; Red = away team win.

=== Group D-4 ===
Pos	Team	Pld	W	D	L	GF	GA	GD	Pts	Qualification or relegation
1	(Andalusia) RB Linense (substituted on)	6	3	2	1	8	5	+3	11	Promoted to Segunda División B
2	(Castilla–La Mancha) Hellín Deportivo	6	2	4	0	7	5	+2	10	
3	(Extremadura) SP Villafranca	6	2	1	3	7	8	−1	7	
4	(Andalusia) UD Maracena	6	1	1	4	4	8	−4	4	

Source: Fútbol Regional

Home \ Away	HEL	LNS	MCN	VFR
Hellín Deportivo	—	1–1	2–1	0–0
RB Linense	2–2	—	1–0	2–0
UD Maracena	0–0	1–0	—	0–1
SP Villafranca	1–2	1–2	4–2	—

Updated to match(es) played on completed. Source: FutbolMe
Legend: Blue = home team win; Yellow = draw; Red = away team win.

=== Group E ===
Pos	Team	Pld	W	D	L	GF	GA	GD	Pts	Qualification or relegation
1	(Canary Islands) UD Lanzarote (substituted on)	6	4	0	2	8	7	+1	12	Promoted to Segunda División B
2	(Canary Islands) UD Telde	6	2	3	1	5	3	+2	9	
3	(Canary Islands) UD Orotava	6	2	2	2	5	6	−1	8	
4	(Canary Islands) UD Las Palmas B	6	1	1	4	4	6	−2	4	

Source: Fútbol Regional

Home \ Away	LNZ	LPA	ORO	TEL
UD Lanzarote	—	1–0	2–0	1–0
UD Las Palmas B	3–1	—	0–1	1–1
UD Orotava	2–3	1–0	—	1–1
UD Telde	2–0	1–0	0–0	—

Updated to match(es) played on completed. Source: FutbolMe
Legend: Blue = home team win; Yellow = draw; Red = away team win.

== Teams Promoted ==
Group I – Galicia (Galicia (Spain))

- None

Group II – Asturias

- None

Group III – Cantabria

- None

Group IV – Basque Country (Basque Country (autonomous community))

- Deportivo Alavés B
- Real Unión de Irún

Group V – Catalonia

- CE Premià

Group VI – Valencian Community

- Novelda CF
- UD Alzira

Group VII – Community of Madrid

- None

Group VIII – Castile and León

- Zamora CF
- SD Gimnástica Segoviana
- SD Ponferradina
- Real Ávila CF

Group IX – E. Andalusia and Melilla

- Guadix CF

Group X – W. Andalusia and Ceuta

- RB Linense
- Dos Hermanas CF
- Coria CF

Group XI – Balearic Islands

- None

Group XII – Canary Islands

- UD Lanzarote

Group XIII – Region of Murcia

- Lorca CF

Group XIV – Extremadura

- None

Group XV – Navarre and La Rioja

- CD Izarra

Group XVI – Aragon

- CF Figueruelas

Group XVII – Castilla–La Mancha

- None
