= 1999–2000 Segunda División B =

Segunda División B
- Season: 1999–2000
- Promoted: Universidad de Las Palmas; Racing Ferrol; Murcia; Jaén
- Relegated: Lanzarote; Oviedo B Gimnástica Segoviana; Móstoles; Bermeo; Valladolid B Figueruelas; Izarra; Valencia B Yeclano; Ontinyent; Lorca; Betis B Cacereño; Sevilla B Águilas; Avilés
- Top goalscorer: Chili (31 goals)
- Best goalkeeper: Pedro Dorronsoro (0.38 goals)
- Biggest home win: Binéfar 7–0 Valladolid B (10 October 1999); Mensajero 7–0 Caudal (24 October 1999)
- Biggest away win: Talavera 1–6 Manchego (12 March 2000)
- Highest scoring: Barcelona B 8–2 Ontinyent (27 November 1999); Ontinyent 5–5 Valencia B (5 February 2000)

The 1999–2000 season of Segunda División B of Spanish football started August 1999 and ended May 2000.

== Summary before the 1999–2000 season ==
Playoffs de Ascenso:

- Getafe (P)
- Universidad de Las Palmas
- Real Madrid B
- Racing de Ferrol
- Cultural Leonesa
- Bermeo
- Barakaldo
- Burgos
- Levante (P)
- Cartagonova
- Elche (P)
- Murcia
- Melilla
- Sevilla B
- Córdoba (P)
- Polideportivo Almería

Relegated from Segunda División:

- Mallorca B
- Barcelona B
- Hércules
- Ourense

Promoted from Tercera División:

- Alavés B (from Group 4)
- Real Unión (from Group 4)
- Premià (from Group 5)
- Novelda (from Group 6)
- Alzira (from Group 6)
- Zamora (from Group 8)
- Gimnástica Segoviana (from Group 8)
- Ponferradina (from Group 8)
- Real Ávila (from Group 8)
- Guadix (from Group 9)
- Linense (from Group 10)
- Dos Hermanas (from Group 10)
- Coria (from Group 10)
- Lanzarote (from Group 12)
- Lorca (from Group 13)
- Izarra (from Group 15)
- Figueruelas (from Group 16)

Relegated:

- Deportivo de La Coruña B
- Langreo
- Lalín
- Lealtad
- Noja
- Lemona
- Tropezón
- Elgoibar
- Espanyol B
- Benidorm
- Palamós
- Gavà
- Plasencia
- Almería
- Moralo
- Isla Cristina
- Algeciras

== Group I ==
Teams from Asturias, Canary Islands, Castile and León, Community of Madrid and Galicia.

=== Teams ===
Location of teams in Segunda División B Gr. 1 1999–2000
Canary Islands

Team	Founded	Home city	Stadium
Real Ávila	1923	Ávila, Castile and León	Adolfo Suárez
Real Avilés Industrial	1903	Avilés, Asturias	Román Sánchez Puerta
Caudal	1918	Mieres, Asturias	Hermanos Antuña
Cultural Leonesa	1923	León, Castile and León	Puente Castro
Fuenlabrada	1975	Fuenlabrada, Madrid	La Aldehuela
Gimnástica Segoviana	1928	Segovia, Castile and León	La Albuera
Lanzarote	1970	Arrecife, Canary Islands	Ciudad Deportiva de Lanzarote
Lugo	1953	Lugo, Galicia	Anxo Carro
Mensajero	1924	Santa Cruz de La Palma, Canary Islands	Silvestre Carrillo
Móstoles	1955	Móstoles, Community of Madrid	El Soto
Ourense	1952	Ourense, Galicia	O Couto
Oviedo B	1930	Oviedo, Asturias	El Requexón
Pájara Playas de Jandía	1996	Pájara, Canary Islands	Benito Alonso
Ponferradina	1922	Ponferrada, Castile and León	El Toralín
Pontevedra	1941	Pontevedra, Galicia	Pasarón
Racing Ferrol	1919	Ferrol, Galicia	A Malata
Real Madrid B	1930	Madrid, Madrid	Ciudad Deportiva
San Sebastián de los Reyes	1971	San Sebastián de los Reyes, Madrid	Matapiñonera
Sporting Gijón B	1960	Gijón, Asturias	Mareo
Universidad Las Palmas	1994	Las Palmas, Canary Islands	Campo Universitario Tafira

=== League table ===
Pos	Team	Pld	W	D	L	GF	GA	GD	Pts	Qualification or relegation
1	Universidad de Las Palmas	38	21	9	8	40	17	+23	72	Qualification for Play-Off
2	Ourense	38	20	9	9	48	29	+19	69	Qualification for Play-Off
3	Racing Ferrol	38	19	11	8	69	24	+45	68	Qualification for Play-Off
4	Mensajero	38	19	9	10	53	35	+18	66	Qualification for Play-Off
5	Real Madrid B	38	17	10	11	72	51	+21	61	
6	SS Reyes	38	16	10	12	51	42	+9	58	
7	Pontevedra	38	15	9	14	46	49	−3	54	
8	Lugo	38	14	10	14	42	46	−4	52	
9	Cultural Leonesa	38	13	12	13	52	50	+2	51	
10	Pájara Playas	38	13	12	13	52	51	+1	51	
11	Ávila	38	13	12	13	47	54	−7	51	
12	Sporting de Gijón B	38	13	12	13	48	51	−3	51	
13	Fuenlabrada	38	13	11	14	42	47	−5	50	
14	Caudal	38	11	12	15	37	56	−19	45	
15	Ponferradina	38	12	8	18	34	55	−21	44	
16	Avilés	38	10	13	15	38	43	−5	43	Qualification for Play-out
17	Lanzarote	38	10	12	16	47	54	−7	42	Relegation to 2000–01 Tercera División
18	Oviedo B	38	10	9	19	37	50	−13	39	Relegation to 2000–01 Tercera División
19	Gimnástica Segoviana	38	7	14	17	20	47	−27	35	Relegation to 2000–01 Tercera División
20	Móstoles	38	8	8	22	34	58	−24	32	Relegation to 2000–01 Tercera División

Source: BDFutbol
Rules for classification: 1) points; 2) head-to-head points; 3) head-to-head goal difference; 4) head-to-head goals scored; 5) goal difference; 6) number of goals scored.

=== Results ===
Home \ Away	AVLA	AVLS	CAU	CUL	FUE	GSE	LAN	LUG	MEN	MOS	OUR	OVI	PAJ	PNF	PNT	RFE	RMB	SSR	SPG	ULP
Real Ávila	—	2–2	0–0	1–1	3–2	0–0	3–1	0–0	0–1	0–1	1–1	3–2	2–2	0–1	2–1	0–2	2–2	2–1	1–2	2–1
Real Avilés Ind.	0–1	—	0–0	2–3	0–0	1–1	2–1	2–1	1–2	4–2	3–0	1–2	0–0	0–1	2–2	0–3	0–1	1–2	1–2	0–0
Caudal	3–1	4–1	—	0–1	0–3	2–0	2–2	2–2	1–0	2–1	0–0	1–1	3–2	0–0	2–0	1–0	3–1	1–1	0–2	1–0
Cultural Leonesa	3–0	2–0	2–2	—	1–0	1–2	0–0	0–2	2–1	2–1	3–2	1–2	6–2	2–1	2–4	1–1	2–1	3–1	0–0	0–1
Fuenlabrada	1–0	1–1	2–2	2–0	—	1–1	1–0	3–2	1–2	2–1	0–0	1–2	4–0	1–0	2–1	0–1	1–0	1–1	1–1	0–1
Gim. Segoviana	0–1	1–1	1–0	1–0	1–1	—	0–0	0–1	0–1	1–0	1–2	0–1	0–1	0–0	0–0	0–4	1–0	1–2	1–1	0–0
Lanzarote	4–1	1–0	1–1	2–2	3–0	3–1	—	2–2	0–0	2–0	1–0	0–1	0–0	4–0	2–3	2–1	4–2	1–1	2–1	0–0
Lugo	2–0	2–1	1–0	1–1	2–1	1–0	1–0	—	0–0	1–1	0–1	2–1	3–0	1–1	3–1	1–2	0–0	1–1	0–4	0–1
Mensajero	2–2	2–0	7–0	1–0	2–1	4–0	1–0	2–1	—	0–0	0–2	1–0	1–1	3–1	0–1	2–1	0–1	0–3	3–0	0–0
Móstoles	2–1	0–1	3–1	3–3	1–2	0–1	1–0	2–1	0–0	—	0–1	1–1	1–0	1–2	1–1	1–0	1–2	1–2	1–1	0–1
Ourense	1–1	0–0	2–0	0–0	2–0	2–0	5–1	1–0	1–0	4–0	—	1–1	1–0	1–2	2–0	1–0	2–2	1–0	2–0	1–0
Oviedo B	4–1	0–1	0–0	4–1	1–2	0–0	2–1	0–1	0–1	1–2	1–4	—	1–1	2–0	1–1	0–0	3–2	0–2	2–2	0–1
Pájara Playas	1–2	1–1	5–0	1–0	1–1	2–1	1–1	4–0	0–0	3–2	0–1	4–0	—	2–1	3–1	2–1	1–1	2–1	4–0	0–2
Ponferradina	1–2	0–2	0–1	1–1	2–0	2–3	2–0	1–0	1–3	0–0	1–0	1–0	2–0	—	2–1	1–0	2–2	0–1	1–3	0–1
Pontevedra	1–3	0–2	3–2	1–1	0–0	3–0	1–0	3–2	3–1	1–0	1–0	1–0	2–0	2–1	—	0–0	1–2	0–1	2–0	0–1
Racing Ferrol	2–0	0–0	2–1	3–1	5–1	5–0	5–0	0–1	4–0	3–0	2–0	2–0	4–1	5–0	2–2	—	1–1	3–1	1–1	0–0
Real Madrid B	2–2	1–2	4–1	2–4	0–1	4–1	3–2	2–2	3–1	4–0	5–1	1–0	1–1	5–0	4–0	0–0	—	2–0	3–1	2–1
San Sebast. Reyes	1–3	1–1	1–0	0–0	1–1	0–0	2–1	3–0	2–2	2–0	2–1	2–0	1–3	5–2	0–1	1–1	3–1	—	0–2	0–1
Sporting B	1–2	1–2	2–0	1–0	3–1	0–0	1–1	2–0	1–5	3–2	1–1	2–1	1–1	1–1	1–1	1–3	3–1	0–2	—	0–1
Univ. Las Palmas	0–0	2–0	2–0	1–0	3–0	0–0	5–2	1–2	1–2	2–1	0–1	2–0	2–0	0–0	2–0	0–0	1–2	2–1	1–0	—

Source: BDFutbol
Legend: Blue = home team win; Yellow = draw; Red = away team win.

=== Top goalscorers ===
Goalscorers	Goals	Team
(Argentina) Rolando Zárate	21	Real Madrid B
(Spain) Raúl Borrero	18	Pájara Playas
(Spain) Antonio Luna	15	Mensajero
(Spain) Miguel López	14	Sporting de Gijón B
(Equatorial Guinea) Juan Epitié	13	Real Madrid B

=== Top goalkeepers ===
Goalkeeper	Goals	Matches	Average	Team
(Spain) Moisés Trujillo	17	38	0.45	Universidad de Las Pamas
(Spain) Xabier Jauregi	24	38	0.63	Racing de Ferrol
(Spain) Ramón Ruiz	28	37	0.76	Ourense
(Spain) José Manuel Santisteban	32	35	0.91	Mensajero
(Spain) Sergio Segura	40	37	1.08	SS Reyes

== Group II ==
Teams from Aragon, Basque Country, Cantabria, Castile and León, Castilla–La Mancha, La Rioja and Navarre.

=== Teams ===
Location of teams in Segunda División B Gr. 2 1999–2000

Team	Founded	Home city	Stadium
Alavés B	1960	Vitoria, Basque Country	José Luis Compañón
Amurrio	1949	Amurrio, Basque Country	Basarte
Athletic Bilbao B	1964	Bilbao, Basque Country	Lezama
Aurrerá Vitoria	1935	Vitoria, Basque Country	Olanrabe
Barakaldo	1917	Barakaldo, Basque Country	Lasesarre
Beasain	1905	Beasain, Basque Country	Loinaz
Bermeo	1950	Bermeo, Basque Country	Itxas Gane
Binéfar	1922	Binéfar, Aragon	Los Olmos
Burgos	1985	Burgos, Castile and León	El Plantío
Calahorra	1946	Calahorra, La Rioja	La Planilla
Conquense	1946	Cuenca, Castilla–La Mancha	La Fuensanta
Figueruelas	1987	Figueruelas, Aragon	San Isidro
Gernika	1922	Gernika, Basque Country	Urbieta
Gimnástica Torrelavega	1907	Torrelavega, Cantabria	El Malecón
Izarra	1924	Estella-Lizarra, Navarre	Merkatondoa
Osasuna B	1962	Aranguren, Navarre	Tajonar
Real Unión	1915	Irún, Basque Country	Stadium Gal
Valladolid B	1942	Valladolid, Castile and León	Ciudad Deportiva del Real Valladolid
Zamora	1968	Zamora, Castile and León	La Vaguada
Zaragoza B	1958	Zaragoza, Aragon	Ciudad Deportiva del Real Zaragoza

=== League Table ===
Pos	Team	Pld	W	D	L	GF	GA	GD	Pts	Qualification or relegation
1	Gimnástica de Torrelavega	38	23	9	6	59	18	+41	78	Qualification for Play-Off
2	Zaragoza B	38	20	11	7	53	29	+24	71	Qualification for Play-Off
3	Burgos	38	19	13	6	58	26	+32	70	Qualification for Play-Off
4	Barakaldo	38	18	10	10	47	28	+19	64	Qualification for Play-Off
5	Aurrerá	38	17	9	12	48	28	+20	60	
6	Beasain	38	16	11	11	39	38	+1	59	
7	Amurrio	38	16	9	13	42	33	+9	57	
8	Athletic Bilbao B	38	15	10	13	45	35	+10	55	
9	Calahorra	38	13	12	13	51	50	+1	51	
10	Conquense	38	13	11	14	38	51	−13	50	
11	Alavés B	38	14	8	16	49	50	−1	50	
12	Zamora	38	12	14	12	38	32	+6	50	
13	Gernika	38	12	11	15	45	46	−1	47	
14	Binéfar	38	12	11	15	37	38	−1	47	
15	Osasuna B	38	12	10	16	38	49	−11	46	
16	Real Unión	38	13	6	19	42	53	−11	45	Qualification for Play-out
17	Bermeo	38	10	12	16	34	51	−17	42	Relegation to 2000–01 Tercera División
18	Valladolid B	38	9	7	22	27	63	−36	34	Relegation to 2000–01 Tercera División
19	Figueruelas	38	8	9	21	34	66	−32	33	Relegation to 2000–01 Tercera División
20	Izarra	38	8	7	23	27	67	−40	31	Relegation to 2000–01 Tercera División

Source: BDFutbol
Rules for classification: 1) points; 2) head-to-head points; 3) head-to-head goal difference; 4) head-to-head goals scored; 5) goal difference; 6) number of goals scored.

=== Results ===
Home \ Away	ALV	AMU	ATH	AUR	BAR	BEA	BER	BIN	BUR	CAL	CON	FIG	GER	GIM	IZA	OSA	RUN	VLD	ZAM	ZAR
Alavés B	—	1–2	1–4	0–0	1–1	4–0	0–1	1–0	1–3	1–2	0–2	1–1	1–3	1–0	0–1	1–0	1–0	2–2	2–1	0–2
Amurrio	3–1	—	2–0	0–0	1–0	1–2	4–1	2–1	0–1	0–1	5–2	2–0	0–0	1–0	2–0	3–0	0–2	2–1	1–1	1–3
Athletic B	1–1	0–0	—	2–3	2–0	0–3	1–0	1–0	3–0	4–0	0–0	1–1	3–0	0–0	6–0	2–2	2–0	0–2	2–1	1–2
Aurrerá Vitoria	2–0	2–0	2–1	—	0–0	0–0	0–1	1–0	1–1	3–1	2–2	3–0	2–0	1–1	1–0	1–2	0–1	6–0	3–0	2–0
Barakaldo	1–2	0–0	1–0	2–0	—	3–1	2–1	3–0	1–0	4–2	1–0	3–1	2–1	0–0	3–1	3–0	1–0	4–0	0–1	3–0
Beasain	1–0	1–0	0–1	2–0	1–0	—	1–1	0–1	0–1	0–2	3–0	4–2	2–2	1–0	4–0	2–2	3–1	0–0	0–0	2–1
Bermeo	1–3	0–1	2–0	2–1	1–1	0–1	—	0–0	0–1	1–1	1–3	1–0	0–0	2–2	2–1	3–1	0–0	0–1	2–1	1–2
Binéfar	2–1	0–1	0–1	0–2	0–1	3–0	2–1	—	0–0	1–1	1–1	1–1	2–1	1–1	2–1	2–0	2–1	7–0	1–0	0–0
Burgos	1–0	1–0	2–0	1–1	3–0	0–0	0–0	0–0	—	0–2	5–0	5–0	4–1	1–1	4–0	0–0	1–1	1–0	2–2	1–2
Calahorra	3–1	0–0	2–0	1–0	1–1	0–0	2–0	2–1	1–1	—	1–2	5–0	3–2	0–2	0–2	2–2	3–0	3–0	0–0	1–1
Conquense	1–1	0–1	1–2	2–1	1–0	2–2	3–3	1–1	1–5	1–0	—	3–1	1–0	0–1	1–2	0–0	0–2	0–0	0–0	0–0
Figueruelas	0–4	1–0	1–1	0–1	1–0	0–1	0–2	2–2	0–2	2–1	0–1	—	2–2	2–2	5–0	1–0	1–3	1–1	0–2	0–1
Gernika	1–1	1–1	0–0	0–2	2–0	2–0	0–0	1–0	0–2	3–2	3–1	1–1	—	0–1	4–0	1–2	4–0	2–0	1–0	1–1
Gim. Torrelavega	0–0	1–0	2–0	1–0	1–0	1–0	4–0	5–1	3–1	3–0	2–0	2–0	3–0	—	3–0	1–1	2–0	3–0	2–0	1–0
Izarra	0–1	3–1	1–2	0–2	1–1	0–0	4–0	0–1	0–0	3–3	1–0	1–0	1–1	0–2	—	1–3	1–0	0–0	0–0	0–2
Osasuna B	0–2	2–1	1–0	0–0	0–0	0–1	3–1	2–1	1–0	3–1	0–1	1–2	1–2	0–4	2–0	—	2–2	1–0	0–1	2–4
Real Unión	3–5	2–3	0–0	0–3	1–2	2–1	0–1	0–1	1–1	1–0	1–2	3–1	1–0	0–1	2–1	1–0	—	4–0	2–0	2–0
Valladolid B	0–3	1–1	1–2	2–0	1–3	0–1	1–1	2–0	1–3	3–0	1–2	1–2	0–3	1–0	2–1	0–1	2–0	—	0–2	0–1
Zamora	1–2	0–0	1–0	1–0	0–0	6–1	0–0	0–0	2–3	2–2	0–1	2–1	2–0	3–1	1–0	0–0	3–0	0–1	—	2–2
Zaragoza B	4–2	1–0	0–0	2–0	0–0	0–0	4–1	1–0	0–1	0–0	4–0	0–1	2–0	1–0	4–0	2–1	3–3	1–0	0–0	—

Source: BDFutbol
Legend: Blue = home team win; Yellow = draw; Red = away team win.

=== Top goalscorers ===
Goalscorers	Goals	Team
(Spain) Chili	31	Gimnástica de Torrelavega
(Spain) José Manuel Redondo	20	Zaragoza B
(Spain) Roberto Peragón	17	Burgos
(Spain) Jorge Salvatierra	13	Calahorra
(Spain) César Esteban	12	Burgos

=== Top goalkeepers ===
Goalkeeper	Goals	Matches	Average	Team
(Spain) Pedro Dorronsoro	12	32	0.38	Gimnástica de Torrelavega
(Spain) José Andrés Duro	26	37	0.7	Burgos
(Spain) Xabier Rivas	27	36	0.75	Amurrio
(Spain) Javier Pinillos	27	36	0.75	Zamora
(Spain) Ramón Blanco	24	32	0.75	Aurrerá

== Group III ==
Teams from Balearic Islands, Catalonia, Region of Murcia and Valencian Community.

=== Teams ===
Location of teams in Segunda División B Gr. 3 1999–2000

Team	Founded	Home city	Stadium
Alzira	1946	Alzira, Valencian Community	Luis Suñer Picó
Barcelona B	1970	Barcelona, Catalonia	Mini Estadi
Cartagonova	1995	Cartagena, Region of Murcia	Cartagonova
Castellón	1922	Castellón de la Plana, Valencian Community	Nou Castàlia
Figueres	1919	Figueres, Catalonia	Vilatenim
Gandía	1947	Gandia, Valencian Community	Guillermo Olagüe
Gimnàstic de Tarragona	1886	Tarragona, Catalonia	Nou Estadi
Gramenet	1994	Santa Coloma de Gramenet, Catalonia	Nou Camp Municipal
Hércules	1922	Alicante, Valencian Community	José Rico Pérez
Hospitalet	1957	L'Hospitalet de Llobregat, Catalonia	La Feixa Llarga
Lorca	1994	Lorca, Region of Murcia	San José
Mallorca B	1967	Palma, Balearic Islands	Lluís Sitjar
Murcia	1919	Murcia, Region of Murcia	La Condomina
Novelda	1925	Novelda, Valencian Community	La Magdalena
Ontinyent	1931	Ontinyent, Valencian Community	El Clariano
Premià	1915	Premià de Mar, Catalonia	Municipal
Sabadell	1903	Sabadell, Catalonia	Nova Creu Alta
Terrassa	1906	Terrassa, Catalonia	Olímpic de Terrassa
Valencia B	1944	Valencia, Valencian Community	Ciudad Deportiva de Paterna
Yeclano	1950	Yecla, Region of Murcia	La Constitución

=== League Table ===
Pos	Team	Pld	W	D	L	GF	GA	GD	Pts	Qualification or relegation
1	Gandía	38	19	11	8	50	30	+20	68	Qualification for Play-Off
2	Murcia	38	16	17	5	56	35	+21	65	Qualification for Play-Off
3	Gramenet	38	19	8	11	59	35	+24	65	Qualification for Play-Off
4	Hércules	38	17	13	8	49	35	+14	64	Qualification for Play-Off
5	Mallorca B	38	15	18	5	56	33	+23	63	
6	Figueres	38	17	9	12	48	39	+9	60	
7	Castellón	38	16	10	12	48	44	+4	58	
8	Cartagonova	38	14	14	10	41	36	+5	56	
9	Gimnàstic	38	14	10	14	43	44	−1	52	
10	Hospitalet	38	11	15	12	44	38	+6	48	
11	FC Barcelona B	38	12	12	14	61	58	+3	48	
12	Premià	38	12	11	15	42	52	−10	47	
13	Sabadell	38	10	16	12	35	44	−9	46	
14	Alzira	38	11	11	16	31	35	−4	44	
15	Terrassa	38	10	12	16	35	53	−18	42	
16	Novelda	38	11	9	18	33	52	−19	42	Qualification for Play-out
17	Valencia B	38	9	13	16	48	59	−11	40	Relegation to 2000–2001 Tercera División
18	Yeclano	38	10	8	20	39	51	−12	38	Relegation to 2000–2001 Tercera División
19	Ontinyent	38	9	11	18	47	64	−17	38	Relegation to 2000–2001 Tercera División
20	Lorca	38	8	12	18	31	59	−28	36	Relegation to 2000–2001 Tercera División

Source: BDFutbol
Rules for classification: 1) points; 2) head-to-head points; 3) head-to-head goal difference; 4) head-to-head goals scored; 5) goal difference; 6) number of goals scored.

=== Results ===
Home \ Away	ALZ	BAR	CAR	CAS	FIG	GAN	GIM	GRA	HÉR	HOS	LOR	MAL	MUR	NOV	ONT	PRE	SAB	TER	VAL	YEC
Alzira	—	4–0	0–0	0–1	1–1	0–0	1–1	0–2	1–0	0–0	1–0	0–2	0–1	1–2	3–1	2–1	0–1	1–0	0–0	1–0
Barcelona B	0–2	—	5–1	1–0	0–2	0–2	2–1	1–3	3–3	2–2	3–1	2–2	3–3	2–0	8–2	1–3	1–1	5–1	1–1	0–0
Cartagonova	2–1	2–1	—	1–0	2–0	0–0	0–1	1–0	0–1	1–0	1–2	1–1	2–0	1–0	0–3	4–0	1–2	0–0	0–0	1–2
Castellón	1–2	2–1	1–0	—	5–1	3–0	2–2	0–1	1–0	4–3	1–1	3–2	2–1	4–0	0–2	1–1	1–2	1–0	0–0	2–1
Figueres	1–0	0–1	1–1	2–0	—	3–0	1–2	2–0	2–2	2–0	3–0	1–0	2–4	1–0	3–1	0–1	3–1	0–0	1–0	1–0
Gandía	1–0	1–1	1–2	0–0	2–1	—	0–1	0–1	1–1	2–1	1–0	0–0	0–0	0–0	1–0	3–1	5–0	3–1	3–1	3–1
Gimnàstic	0–1	1–2	2–0	0–1	1–2	0–1	—	0–0	1–2	0–0	2–2	0–0	2–2	1–2	2–0	1–0	1–0	0–0	1–0	0–2
Gramenet	3–2	1–4	3–3	4–0	4–1	3–0	2–1	—	3–0	1–0	2–0	1–1	0–0	2–0	4–1	2–1	1–2	1–2	1–2	0–1
Hércules	2–0	2–1	0–0	1–2	1–0	1–0	0–0	0–0	—	1–1	1–0	1–2	0–3	3–0	4–1	1–1	2–2	3–0	1–1	1–0
Hospitalet	3–0	0–0	1–0	0–0	1–0	0–0	4–2	0–2	0–1	—	2–0	2–0	1–1	1–0	2–2	0–1	1–1	4–3	4–0	5–2
Lorca	1–1	2–2	1–3	2–0	1–1	0–3	2–1	1–0	3–2	1–1	—	0–3	0–2	1–2	1–0	0–1	1–1	2–1	1–1	1–0
Mallorca B	3–2	0–0	0–0	1–1	2–0	5–2	0–1	0–0	1–2	1–0	0–0	—	1–1	1–0	1–1	1–1	1–0	3–0	3–2	2–0
Murcia	1–0	3–1	1–1	1–2	2–2	0–0	2–3	2–1	1–1	2–1	1–0	2–2	—	2–0	1–1	2–0	3–0	0–0	3–0	2–1
Novelda	0–0	1–0	1–1	2–2	1–1	0–4	1–2	1–1	2–1	1–0	1–1	1–3	2–1	—	4–1	0–2	1–1	0–1	0–2	2–1
Ontinyent	0–0	0–1	0–1	0–1	0–1	0–1	0–2	1–1	0–1	1–1	1–0	3–3	1–1	2–1	—	3–1	2–0	1–1	5–5	2–1
Premià	1–0	2–2	2–2	3–2	2–1	1–3	2–3	2–1	0–2	1–2	3–1	0–0	0–0	0–0	2–1	—	2–2	0–1	3–1	0–3
Sabadell	0–0	1–2	0–0	1–0	0–0	1–1	4–0	1–0	0–0	0–0	1–1	0–2	0–0	0–3	1–2	3–1	—	0–1	1–0	1–2
Terrassa	0–2	1–0	2–4	1–1	1–2	1–3	1–3	0–3	1–1	0–0	3–0	0–0	1–2	2–1	1–1	1–0	1–1	—	3–3	0–1
Valencia B	1–0	3–2	0–0	3–0	0–0	0–1	2–1	1–2	0–2	1–1	6–0	2–6	2–3	0–1	1–4	0–0	1–1	1–2	—	2–1
Yeclano	2–2	2–0	1–2	1–1	0–3	0–2	1–1	1–3	1–2	2–0	1–1	1–1	0–0	3–0	2–1	0–0	1–2	0–1	1–3	—

Source: BDFutbol
Legend: Blue = home team win; Yellow = draw; Red = away team win.

=== Top goalscorers ===
Goalscorers	Goals	Team
(Spain) Xisco Muñoz	15	Valencia Mestalla
(Spain) Marcos Estruch	14	Gandía
(Spain) Keko Martínez	14	Cartagena
(Spain) José Luis Garzón	14	Yeclano
(Spain) Nano García	13	Gramenet

=== Top goalkeepers ===
Goalkeeper	Goals	Matches	Average	Team
(Spain) Juan Pedro Espín	29	36	0.81	Gandía
(Spain) Rodri	28	34	0.82	Murcia
(Spain) Miguel Navarro	26	31	0.84	Hospitalet
(Spain) Miki Garro	29	34	0.85	Mallorca B
(Spain) Carmelo Trujillo	30	35	0.86	Cartagena

== Group IV ==
Teams from Andalusia, Castilla–La Mancha, Ceuta, Extremadura, Melilla and Region of Murcia.

=== Teams ===
Location of teams in Segunda División B Gr. 4 1999–2000

Team	Founded	Home city	Stadium
Águilas	1925	Águilas, Region of Murcia	El Rubial
Betis B	1962	Seville, Andalusia	Ciudad Deportiva Ruíz de Lopera
Cacereño	1919	Cáceres, Extremadura	Príncipe Felipe
Cádiz	1910	Cádiz, Andalusia	Ramón de Carranza
Ceuta	1996	Ceuta	Alfonso Murube
Coria	1923	Coria del Río, Andalusia	Guadalquivir
Dos Hermanas	1970	Dos Hermanas, Andalusia	Miguel Román García
Écija	1939	Écija, Andalusia	San Pablo
Granada	1931	Granada, Andalusia	Nuevo Los Cármenes
Guadix	1932	Guadix, Andalusia	Municipal de Guadix
Jaén	1922	Jaén, Andalusia	La Victoria
Jerez	1969	Jerez de los Caballeros, Extremadura	Manuel Calzado Galván
Linense	1912	La Línea de la Concepción, Andalusia	Municipal La Línea de la Concepción
Manchego	1929	Ciudad Real, Castilla–La Mancha	Príncipe Juan Carlos
Melilla	1976	Melilla	Álvarez Claro
Motril	1984	Motril, Andalusia	Escribano Castilla
Poli Almería	1983	Almería, Andalusia	Juan Rojas
Sevilla B	1950	Seville, Andalusia	Viejo Nervión
Talavera	1948	Talavera de la Reina, Castilla–La Mancha	El Prado
Xerez	1947	Jerez de la Frontera, Andalusia	Chapín

=== League Table ===
Pos	Team	Pld	W	D	L	GF	GA	GD	Pts	Qualification or relegation
1	Granada	38	21	10	7	54	28	+26	73	Qualification for Play-Off
2	Ceuta	38	20	13	5	54	27	+27	73	Qualification for Play-Off
3	Xerez	38	20	9	9	54	33	+21	69	Qualification for Play-Off
4	Jaén	38	17	13	8	52	31	+21	64	Qualification for Play-Off
5	Polideportivo Almería	38	18	9	11	48	40	+8	63	
6	Dos Hermanas	38	14	17	7	40	30	+10	59	
7	Guadix	38	15	12	11	57	46	+11	57	
8	Linense	38	13	17	8	36	31	+5	56	
9	Melilla	38	14	13	11	44	33	+11	55	
10	Motril	38	15	8	15	50	44	+6	53	
11	Manchego	38	11	16	11	41	41	0	49 (Note: Manchego was dissolved at the end of the season.)	
12	Cádiz	38	10	15	13	23	27	−4	45	
13	Jerez	38	11	11	16	40	47	−7	44	
14	Écija	38	11	11	16	29	40	−11	44	
15	Coria	38	12	7	19	29	51	−22	43	
16	Talavera	38	9	12	17	40	55	−15	39	Qualification for Play-out
17	Betis B	38	8	15	15	37	56	−19	39	Relegation to 2000–01 Tercera División
18	Cacereño	38	9	11	18	29	45	−16	38	Relegation to 2000–01 Tercera División
19	Sevilla B	38	5	14	19	31	52	−21	29	Relegation to 2000–01 Tercera División
20	Águilas	38	6	9	23	26	57	−31	27	Relegation to 2000–01 Tercera División

Source: BDFutbol
Rules for classification: 1) points; 2) head-to-head points; 3) head-to-head goal difference; 4) head-to-head goals scored; 5) goal difference; 6) number of goals scored.

=== Results ===
Home \ Away	AGU	BET	CAC	CAD	CEU	COR	DHE	ECI	GRA	GUA	JAE	JER	LIN	MAN	MEL	MOT	PAL	SEV	TAL	XER
Águilas	—	0–1	2–0	0–1	0–1	0–1	1–4	1–0	2–2	3–1	1–1	3–1	1–1	0–1	1–2	0–1	2–1	0–2	2–4	0–2
Betis B	0–0	—	1–1	0–0	3–3	4–0	0–0	1–0	0–1	1–3	0–2	2–2	0–2	1–0	1–0	0–0	0–1	1–1	0–3	0–3
Cacereño	1–1	2–2	—	0–1	0–2	1–0	0–2	1–0	2–1	1–1	0–0	3–1	0–1	0–0	2–0	1–1	1–3	2–0	0–0	0–1
Cádiz	1–0	1–0	1–0	—	0–1	1–2	0–0	1–2	0–1	0–2	0–1	3–0	1–0	0–0	0–0	3–1	0–0	1–1	0–0	1–0
Ceuta	0–0	1–1	3–0	3–1	—	2–1	2–0	3–0	0–0	1–0	3–2	3–3	1–0	3–0	1–1	1–0	1–1	0–0	4–1	1–1
Coria	3–1	0–3	2–3	0–0	0–1	—	1–1	1–0	1–0	2–1	1–0	1–3	0–1	0–1	1–0	1–2	1–0	0–2	1–2	1–0
Dos Hermanas	1–0	2–0	1–2	1–1	2–0	1–1	—	0–0	0–1	1–1	1–0	1–1	1–1	2–1	0–0	1–2	0–1	2–1	1–0	1–1
Écija	3–0	0–0	1–0	0–0	0–1	1–1	1–1	—	0–1	1–1	2–1	1–4	1–0	3–0	2–1	1–0	0–1	2–1	1–0	0–0
Granada	3–0	3–1	1–0	0–0	1–0	2–0	1–2	2–0	—	2–1	1–1	1–0	1–0	4–0	2–2	1–0	1–1	5–2	2–0	1–1
Guadix	3–0	3–3	2–0	1–0	1–1	0–0	1–1	2–1	2–0	—	2–3	0–0	0–0	1–1	0–1	2–0	4–1	4–0	2–4	1–4
Jaén	3–1	2–2	0–0	1–0	3–0	2–0	2–0	3–1	2–1	1–1	—	2–3	0–0	0–0	2–1	1–1	1–0	0–0	1–1	1–0
Jerez	2–1	2–0	1–0	2–0	1–0	0–1	0–0	0–1	0–1	1–0	1–3	—	0–0	2–2	1–1	0–1	2–0	0–0	0–1	1–2
Linense	0–1	1–0	3–2	1–1	0–3	1–1	1–1	1–1	2–2	1–0	0–3	0–0	—	0–0	1–0	1–0	1–0	5–2	2–1	0–0
Manchego	0–0	1–2	1–1	1–0	0–2	4–1	0–0	0–0	1–3	4–0	1–0	3–1	1–1	—	0–2	1–0	1–1	0–0	3–0	1–2
Melilla	3–0	3–0	2–0	0–0	0–0	1–1	1–2	2–0	0–0	1–1	1–1	1–0	2–1	2–2	—	0–1	2–2	1–0	2–1	4–1
Motril	2–0	3–1	3–1	2–0	3–2	3–0	1–1	3–0	1–1	2–4	2–0	3–1	1–3	3–3	1–2	—	1–2	1–0	3–3	2–3
Poli Almería	1–1	6–1	1–0	2–1	0–2	3–0	2–1	2–1	1–0	2–4	2–1	1–0	1–1	0–0	1–0	1–0	—	2–1	2–0	0–1
Sevilla B	3–1	1–1	0–1	1–1	0–0	0–1	1–2	1–1	0–1	1–2	0–3	2–3	1–1	0–1	1–0	1–0	3–3	—	1–1	0–1
Talavera	0–0	2–2	1–1	0–1	0–1	2–0	0–1	1–1	1–3	0–1	0–2	1–1	0–1	1–6	2–1	0–0	2–0	1–1	—	1–0
Xerez	1–0	1–2	2–0	1–1	1–1	2–1	1–2	2–0	2–1	1–2	1–1	2–0	1–1	3–0	1–2	1–0	2–0	1–0	5–3	—

Source: BDFutbol
Legend: Blue = home team win; Yellow = draw; Red = away team win.

=== Top goalscorers ===
Goalscorers	Goals	Team
(Spain) Thierry Pérez	17	Guadix
(Spain) Puli	16	Ceuta
(Spain) Ismael Santiago	14	Granada
(Spain) Carlos Guerrero	13	Talavera
(Spain) Rubén Blaya	12	Jaén

=== Top goalkeepers ===
Goalkeeper	Goals	Matches	Average	Team
(Spain) Álex Sánchez	21	32	0.66	Ceuta
(Spain) José Luis González	23	32	0.72	Xerez
(Spain) Antonio Notario	27	37	0.73	Granada
(Spain) José Antonio Luque	25	33	0.76	Linense
(Spain) Carlos Gaitán	22	29	0.76	Melilla

== Play-offs ==
=== Group A ===
Pos	Team	Pld	W	D	L	GF	GA	GD	Pts	Promotion
1	Universidad de Las Palmas (P)	6	3	3	0	8	2	+6	12	Promoted to Segunda División
2	Xerez	6	2	2	2	6	7	−1	8	
3	Zaragoza B	6	2	1	3	4	8	−4	7	
4	Hércules	6	1	2	3	7	8	−1	5	

Source: futbolme
Rules for classification: 1) points; 2) head-to-head points; 3) head-to-head goal difference; 4) head-to-head goals scored; 5) goal difference; 6) number of goals scored.
(P) Promoted

=== Group B ===
Pos	Team	Pld	W	D	L	GF	GA	GD	Pts	Promotion
1	Jaén (P)	6	2	3	1	8	6	+2	9	Promoted to Segunda División
2	Gimnástica de Torrelavega	6	2	3	1	9	8	+1	9	
3	Ourense	6	2	1	3	9	12	−3	7	
4	Gramenet	6	2	1	3	12	12	0	7	

Source: futbolme
Rules for classification: 1) points; 2) head-to-head points; 3) head-to-head goal difference; 4) head-to-head goals scored; 5) goal difference; 6) number of goals scored.
(P) Promoted

=== Group C ===
Pos	Team	Pld	W	D	L	GF	GA	GD	Pts	Promotion
1	Racing Ferrol (P)	6	3	1	2	11	8	+3	10	Promoted to Segunda División
2	Barakaldo	6	3	0	3	6	6	0	9	
3	Ceuta	6	2	2	2	9	10	−1	8	
4	Gandía	6	2	1	3	7	9	−2	7	

Source: futbolme
Rules for classification: 1) points; 2) head-to-head points; 3) head-to-head goal difference; 4) head-to-head goals scored; 5) goal difference; 6) number of goals scored.
(P) Promoted

=== Group D ===
Pos	Team	Pld	W	D	L	GF	GA	GD	Pts	Promotion
1	Murcia (P)	6	4	0	2	8	6	+2	12	Promoted to Segunda División
2	Granada	6	3	2	1	8	5	+3	11	
3	Burgos	6	3	1	2	11	7	+4	10	
4	Mensajero	6	0	1	5	3	12	−9	1	

Source: futbolme
Rules for classification: 1) points; 2) head-to-head points; 3) head-to-head goal difference; 4) head-to-head goals scored; 5) goal difference; 6) number of goals scored.
(P) Promoted

== Play-out ==
=== Semifinal ===
Team 1	Agg.	Team 2	1st leg	2nd leg
Real Unión	3–2	Novelda	3–0	0–2
Talavera	3–2	Avilés	3–1	0–1

=== Final ===
Team 1	Agg.	Team 2	1st leg	2nd leg
Novelda	2–1	Avilés	1–0	1–1
