= Dorronsoro =

Dorronsoro is a surname. Notable people with the surname include:

- Francisco Dorronsoro (born 1985), Spanish football goalkeeper
- Iñaki Dorronsoro (1947–2026), Spanish industrial engineer
- Pedro Dorronsoro (born 1977), Spanish football goalkeeper
- Xanin Dorronsoro (1937–1960), Spanish football forward

== See also ==
- Andoni Zubiaurre Dorronsoro (born 1996), Spanish football goalkeeper
