= Francisco Javier Lledó =

Spanish footballer

Personal information
- Full name: Francisco Javier Lledó Llano
- Date of birth: 11 July 1979 (age 47)
- Place of birth: Coria del Río, Spain
- Height: 1.86 m (6 ft 1 in)
- Position: Goalkeeper

Senior career*
Years	Team	Apps	(Gls)
1999–2002	Coria	59	(0)
2002–2004	Atlético Madrid B	58	(0)
2004–2007	Valladolid	12	(0)
2007	Murcia	2	(0)
2007–2009	Ceuta	69	(0)
2009–2010	Castellón	35	(0)
2010–2011	Xerez	10	(0)
2011–2012	Oviedo	31	(0)
2012–2013	Albacete	6	(0)
Total		282	(0)
- * Club domestic league appearances and goals

Francisco Javier Lledó Llano (born 11 July 1979) is a Spanish former professional footballer who played as a goalkeeper.

He played 59 matches in the Segunda División for four clubs, and 223 in the Segunda División B in the service of five.

== Club career ==
Born in Coria del Río, Province of Seville, Lledó began his career at his hometown team Coria CF in the Segunda División B. After suffering relegation in 2002 he transferred to Atlético Madrid, playing at the same level for their reserves for the next two years.

Lledó joined Real Valladolid in 2004, being initially only used in the Copa del Rey and helping to an away-goals victory over the Galácticos of Real Madrid in the last 16. He finally made his professional debut on 22 May 2005, keeping a clean sheet in a 3–0 Segunda División win against Atlético Malagueño.

On 31 January 2007, Lledó left for second division club Real Murcia CF for the remainder of the season, playing understudy to Antonio Notario as they won promotion. After two years at AD Ceuta one league below, he signed a two-year contract at CD Castellón on 17 July 2009, featuring regularly in an eventual relegation from division two.

Until his retirement in 2013 at the age of 34, Lledó alternated between the second and third tiers, representing Xerez CD, Real Oviedo and Albacete Balompié.
