= Álvaro Molina =

Álvaro Molina may refer to:

- Álvaro Molina (motorcyclist) (born 1976), Spanish motorcyclist
- Álvaro Molina (footballer) (born 1994), Spanish footballer
