= Manuel Ruiz Sosa =

Spanish footballer and manager

Personal information
- Full name: Manuel Ruiz Sosa
- Date of birth: 10 April 1937
- Place of birth: Coria del Río, Spain
- Date of death: 12 December 2009 (aged 72)
- Place of death: Seville, Spain
- Position: Midfielder

Youth career
- Coria
- Sevilla

Senior career*
Years	Team	Apps	(Gls)
1955–1964	Sevilla	153	(5)
1955–1956	→ Coria (loan)		
1964–1968	Atlético Madrid	37	(0)
1968–1969	Granada	3	(0)
Total		193	(5)

International career
1960	Spain U21	2	(0)
1959–1960	Spain B	3	(1)
1960–1961	Spain	5	(0)

Managerial career
- 1969–1970: Coria
- 1970–1971: Alicante
- 1971–1972: Lleida
- 1972: Jaén
- 1973–1974: Alcoyano
- 1974–1975: Villena
- 1975–1977: Jaén
- 1977–1978: Oviedo
- 1978–1979: Jaén
- 1979–1980: Linares
- 1980–1981: Algeciras
- 1981–1982: Alcalá
- 1982–1983: Granada
- 1983–1984: Córdoba
- 1984–1985: Jaén
- 1987: Almería
- 1987–1988: Coria
- 1988: Granada
- 1990: Andalusia
- 1990–1991: Atlético Madrileño
- 1993–1995: Sevilla (assistant)
- 2000: Sevilla B
- * Club domestic league appearances and goals

Manuel Ruiz Sosa (10 April 1937 – 12 December 2009) was a Spanish football midfielder and manager.

== Honours ==
=== Player ===
Atlético Madrid

- La Liga: 1965–66
- Copa del Generalísimo: 1964–65

=== Manager ===
Granada

- Segunda División B: 1982–83
