= Roberto Peragón =

Spanish footballer (born 1978)

Personal information
- Full name: Roberto Peragón Lacalle
- Date of birth: 7 February 1978 (age 48)
- Place of birth: Madrid, Spain
- Height: 1.70 m (5 ft 7 in)
- Position: Striker

Youth career
- Rayo Vallecano

Senior career*
Years	Team	Apps	(Gls)
1995–1997	Rayo Vallecano B		
1997	Rayo Vallecano	2	(0)
1997–1999	Poli Almería	47	(14)
1999–2000	Burgos	32	(17)
2000–2001	Levante	40	(8)
2001–2004	Rayo Vallecano	105	(18)
2004–2007	Elche	79	(14)
2007–2008	Málaga	27	(7)
2008–2009	Alicante	30	(4)
2009–2011	Girona	74	(20)
2011–2012	Gimnàstic	30	(1)
2012–2013	Cádiz	18	(6)
2013–2015	Puerta Bonita	26	(7)
2015–2016	San Fernando Henares		
Total		510	(116)

Managerial career
- 2021–2022: Getafe (youth)
- 2022–2023: Fuenlabrada Promesas
- 2024–2025: Jaén
- * Club domestic league appearances and goals

Roberto Peragón Lacalle (born 7 February 1978) is a Spanish former footballer who played as a striker, currently a manager.

He amassed Segunda División totals of 317 games and 62 goals over the course of ten seasons, representing seven clubs. He appeared for Rayo Vallecano in La Liga, scoring ten goals in 70 matches.

== Club career ==
Peragón was born in Madrid. He made his professional debut with hometown's Rayo Vallecano, with little impact, going on to represent Segunda División B clubs; in the 1999–2000 season he scored 19 goals for Burgos CF – play-offs included – and soon attracted the likes of Sevilla FC and Deportivo de La Coruña, eventually signing with Levante UD of Segunda División.

After another good year, Peragón rejoined Rayo for two La Liga campaigns (plus 2003–04 in the second division), often featuring as a starter, then spent a further three years in division two with Elche CF. In his last year, he netted 11 times in the league.

Peragón joined Málaga CF in summer 2007, and was a key attacking unit alongside veteran Salva and Nabil Baha for a team that returned to the top flight after a two-year absence. However, on 10 August 2008 he left the Andalusians as he was not part of new manager Antonio Tapia's plans; the following day, the player signed a two-year contract with Alicante CF, recently promoted to the second tier as his former employers Rayo Vallecano.

After a sole season, where he faced relegation and stated in an interview with newspaper Marca in April 2009 that he regretted having transferred due to Alicante's serious structural problems and missed Rayo Vallecano, Peragón moved clubs again, joining Girona FC also of the second division. He later represented Gimnàstic de Tarragona in the second tier and Cádiz CF and CD Puerta Bonita in the third.

== Managerial statistics ==
As of 18 January 2025

Managerial record by team and tenure
Team	Nat	From	To	Record								Ref
Team	Nat	From	To	G	W	D	L	GF	GA	GD	Win %	Ref
Fuenlabrada Promesas	(Spain)	3 August 2022	22 February 2023	21	5	4	12	21	36	−15	23.81	
Jaén	(Spain)	18 March 2024	20 January 2025	32	19	8	5	61	37	+24	59.38	
Total				53	24	12	17	82	73	+9	45.28	—
