= Granada Atlético CF =

Spanish football team

Granada Atlético
- Full name: Granada Atlético Club de Fútbol
- Nickname(s): Los empresarios, Fotocopias
- Founded: 2004
- Dissolved: 2009
- Ground: Nuevo Los Cármenes
- Capacity: 16,200
Home colours	Away colours

Granada Atlético Club de Fútbol was a Spanish football team based in Granada, in the autonomous community of Andalusia. Founded in 2004, it played its last season in Tercera División - Group 9, holding home games at Estadio Nuevo Los Cármenes, with a capacity of 16,200 seats.

== History ==
Granada Atlético was founded in 1969 as Guadix Club de Fútbol. In 2004, it moved to Granada and was renamed Granada Atlético Club de Fútbol, starting competing in the fourth division on the next season. At the same time, a club from Íllora moved to Guadix and was renamed Guadix Club Deportivo, and later Guadix CF.

In early August 2010, when it seemed that Atlético would be absorbed by Granada CF and become its reserve team, the negotiations were broken, and the club announced its liquidation.

== Season to season ==
Season	Tier	Division	Place	Copa del Rey
1969–2005	as Guadix CF (1969)			
2005–06	4	3ª	2nd	
2006–07	4	3ª	1st	
2007–08	4	3ª	3rd	First round
2008–09	4	3ª	10th	

- 4 seasons in Tercera División
