= Eduardo Navarro (footballer, born 1979) =

Spanish footballer (1979–2022)

Personal information
- Full name: Eduardo Navarro Soriano
- Date of birth: 28 January 1979
- Place of birth: Zaragoza, Spain
- Date of death: 29 September 2022 (aged 43)
- Place of death: Zaragoza, Spain
- Height: 1.80 m (5 ft 11 in)
- Position: Goalkeeper

Youth career
- Colegio Miraflores
- Stadium Venecia
- Stadium Casablanca

Senior career*
Years	Team	Apps	(Gls)
1998–2001	Figueruelas	24	(0)
2001–2002	Binéfar	36	(0)
2002–2006	Lleida	112	(0)
2006–2007	Barbastro	32	(0)
2007–2009	Huesca	74	(0)
2009–2012	Numancia	78	(0)
2013–2014	Utebo		
Total		356	(0)
- * Club domestic league appearances and goals

Eduardo Navarro Soriano (28 January 1979 – 29 September 2022) was a Spanish footballer who played as a goalkeeper.

== Career ==
Navarro was born in Zaragoza, Aragon. He played 150 Segunda División matches over six seasons, representing in the competition CD Numancia (three years), UE Lleida (two) and SD Huesca (one); his debut as a professional took place on 28 August 2004, as he appeared for the second club in a 1–2 home loss against Racing de Ferrol. He was a key figure for Huesca in their first-ever promotion to the second tier in 2007–08.

After retiring in 2014 at amateurs Utebo FC, Navarro became a goalkeeper coach.

== Death ==
Navarro died on 29 September 2022 at the age of 43, following a long illness.
