= CF Figueruelas =

Spanish football team

Figueruelas
- Full name: Club de Fútbol Figueruelas
- Founded: 1987
- Dissolved: 2008
- Ground: San Isidro, Figueruelas, Aragón, Spain
- Capacity: 4,500
- 2007–08: 3ª – Group 17, 18th
Home colours	Away colours

Club de Fútbol Figueruelas was a Spanish football team based in Figueruelas, in the autonomous community of Aragon. Founded in 1987 and dissolved in 2008, it held home matches at Estadio San Isidro, with a capacity of 4,500 seats.

== Season to season ==
Season	Tier	Division	Place	Copa del Rey
1987–88	7	2ª Reg.	1st	
1988–89	6	1ª Reg.	8th	
1989–90	6	1ª Reg.	3rd	
1990–91	6	1ª Reg.	2nd	
1991–92	5	Reg. Pref.	9th	
1992–93	5	Reg. Pref.	10th	
1993–94	5	Reg. Pref.	1st	
1994–95	4	3ª	10th	
1995–96	4	3ª	8th	
1996–97	4	3ª	14th	
1997–98	4	3ª	3rd	

Season	Tier	Division	Place	Copa del Rey
1998–99	4	3ª	3rd	
1999–2000	3	2ª B	19th	Preliminary
2000–01	4	3ª	2nd	
2001–02	4	3ª	10th	
2002–03	4	3ª	21st	
2003–04	5	Reg. Pref.	6th	
2004–05	5	Reg. Pref.	3rd	
2005–06	5	Reg. Pref.	2nd	
2006–07	4	3ª	7th	
2007–08	4	3ª	18th	

- 1 season in Segunda División B
- 10 seasons in Tercera División

== Notable players ==
- (Spain) Eduardo Navarro
- (Spain) Rubén Pérez
