= Álvaro Molina (footballer) =

Spanish footballer

Personal information
- Full name: Álvaro Molina González
- Date of birth: 25 February 1994 (age 32)
- Place of birth: Salamanca, Spain
- Position: Centre back

Team information
- Current team: Melilla
- Number: 4

Youth career
- Salamanca
- 2013–2014: Rayo Vallecano

Senior career*
| Years | Team | Apps | (Gls) |
| 2012–2013 | Salmantino | 6 | (0) |
| 2014–2016 | Rayo Vallecano B | 72 | (0) |
| 2016–2017 | Leganés B | 32 | (0) |
| 2016 | Leganés | 0 | (0) |
| 2017–2020 | Alcobendas | 52 | (2) |
| 2020 | Las Rozas | 10 | (1) |
| 2020– | Melilla | 12 | (0) |
- * Club domestic league appearances and goals as of 4 April 2021

Álvaro Molina González (born 25 February 1994) is a Spanish footballer who plays for UD Melilla as a central defender.

== Club career ==
Born in Salamanca, Castile and León, Molina was an UD Salamanca youth graduate. In 2013, after having already done his senior debut with the reserve team, he signed for Rayo Vallecano B, returning to youth football.

After a single campaign with the Juvenil squad, Molina was promoted to the B-side in Tercera División. He was sparingly used during his first season, achieving promotion to Segunda División B, and became a regular starter afterwards, but suffering relegation; he also signed a new two-year contract on 1 July 2015.

On 13 July 2016, Molina moved to another reserve team, CD Leganés B, also in the fourth division. On 29 November 2016, he made his first team debut, coming on as a late substitute for fellow debutant Sergio Segura in a 1–3 home loss against Valencia CF for the season's Copa del Rey.
