= Sergio Castaño =

Spanish footballer and manager

Personal information
- Full name: Sergio Castaño Ortega
- Date of birth: 2 February 1982 (age 44)
- Place of birth: Dos Hermanas, Spain
- Height: 1.82 m (5 ft 11 1/2 in)
- Position: Defensive midfielder

Team information
- Current team: Eldense (assistant)

Youth career
- Peña Rociera
- Sevilla

Senior career*
Years	Team	Apps	(Gls)
2001–2003	Dos Hermanas	34	(0)
2003–2005	Zaragoza B	64	(0)
2005–2007	Xerez	41	(3)
2007–2008	Pontevedra	36	(2)
2008–2009	Ceuta	34	(0)
2009–2011	Pontevedra	54	(2)
2011–2012	Hospitalet	21	(0)
2012–2014	Arroyo	60	(3)
2014–2015	Gerena	16	(0)
Total		360	(10)

Managerial career
- 2015–2016: Gerena (assistant)
- 2016–2019: Betis B (assistant)
- 2019–2021: Ceuta (assistant)
- 2021–: Eldense (assistant)
- * Club domestic league appearances and goals

Sergio Castaño Ortega (born 2 February 1982) is a Spanish former professional footballer who played as a defensive midfielder. He is currently assistant manager of CD Eldense.

== Playing career ==
Castaño was born in Dos Hermanas, Province of Seville. An unsuccessful youth graduate of Sevilla FC, he went on to represent Dos Hermanas CF, Real Zaragoza B, Xerez CD, Pontevedra CF– two spells – AD Ceuta, CE L'Hospitalet and Arroyo CP.

With the exception of Andalusia's Xerez (Segunda División), all of Castaño's career was spent in the lower leagues. In 2014, aged 32, he moved to the Tercera División with CD Gerena.

== Coaching career ==
After retiring, Castaño worked as assistant manager under José Juan Romero at Gerena, Betis Deportivo Balompié and AD Ceuta FC.
