= Dos Hermanas CF =

Spanish football club

Dos Hermanas
- Full name: Dos Hermanas Club de Fútbol 1971
- Founded: 1971; 2021 (refounded)
- Ground: Miguel Román García; Dos Hermanas, Andalusia, Spain
- Capacity: 3,200
- President: Joaquín Morales
- Head coach: Nacho Molina
- League: Tercera Federación – Group 10
- 2025–26: Tercera Federación – Group 10, 2nd of 18
- Website: https://dhcf.es/
Home colours	Away colours

Dos Hermanas Club de Fútbol 1971 is a Spanish football team based in Dos Hermanas, in the autonomous community of Andalusia. Founded in 1971 and refounded in 2021, it plays in Tercera Federación – Group 10, holding home games at Estadio Miguel Román García, with a capacity of 3,200 seats.

The club was dissolved in 2014 due to financial issues, but returned in 2021, in Tercera Andaluza.

== History ==
Logo used until 2014

Originally known as Dos Hermanas CF, the club was dissolved in 2014. After that, two distinct successor teams were created: Atlético Dos Hermanas CF (in 2014) and Dos Hermanas CF 1971 (in 2021). The former was also dissolved in 2023, while the latter took over as the "heir" of the old Dos Hermanas, also inheriting its original foundation date and history.

== Season to season ==
Season	Tier	Division	Place	Copa del Rey
1971–72	5	2ª Reg.	13th	
1972–73	5	2ª Reg.	1st	
1973–74	4	1ª Reg.	6th	
1974–75	4	1ª Reg.	7th	
1975–76	4	Reg. Pref.	11th	
1976–77	4	Reg. Pref.	20th	
1977–78	6	1ª Reg.	19th	
1978–79	6	1ª Reg.	5th	
1979–80	6	1ª Reg.	22nd	
1980–81	6	1ª Reg.	2nd	
1981–82	6	1ª Reg.	7th	
1982–83	6	1ª Reg.	4th	
1983–84	5	Reg. Pref.	6th	
1984–85	5	Reg. Pref.	14th	
1985–86	5	Reg. Pref.	1st	
1986–87	4	3ª	9th	
1987–88	4	3ª	11th	
1988–89	4	3ª	8th	
1989–90	4	3ª	18th	
1990–91	5	Reg. Pref.	8th	

Season	Tier	Division	Place	Copa del Rey
1991–92	5	Reg. Pref.	4th	
1992–93	5	Reg. Pref.	4th	
1993–94	5	Reg. Pref.	2nd	
1994–95	4	3ª	14th	
1995–96	4	3ª	13th	
1996–97	4	3ª	19th	
1997–98	5	Reg. Pref.	1st	
1998–99	4	3ª	2nd	
1999–2000	3	2ª B	6th	Preliminary
2000–01	3	2ª B	7th	Preliminary
2001–02	3	2ª B	18th	
2002–03	4	3ª	5th	
2003–04	4	3ª	12th	
2004–05	4	3ª	13th	
2005–06	4	3ª	18th	
2006–07	5	1ª And.	3rd	
2007–08	4	3ª	15th	
2008–09	4	3ª	15th	
2009–10	4	3ª	19th	
2010–11	5	1ª And.	15th	

Season	Tier	Division	Place	Copa del Rey
2011–12	5	1ª And.	18th	
2012–13	6	Reg. Pref.	13th	
2013–14	6	Reg. Pref.	15th	

- 3 seasons in Segunda División B
- 15 seasons in Tercera División

=== Team refounded ===
Season	Tier	Division	Place	Copa del Rey
2021–22	9	3ª And.	2nd	
2022–23	8	2ª And.	3rd	
2023–24	7	1ª And.	1st	
2024–25	6	Div. Hon.	3rd	
2025–26	5	3ª Fed.	2nd	
2026–27	5	3ª Fed.		

- 2 seasons in Tercera Federación

== Notable former players ==
- (Spain) Alejandro Campano
- (Spain) Sergio Castaño
- (Spain) Diego
- (Spain) Daniel Güiza

== Notable former managers ==
- (Spain) Lucas Alcaraz
