= 2000 Segunda División B play-offs =

Spanish football league play-offs

The 2000 Segunda División B play-offs (Playoffs de Ascenso or Promoción de Ascenso) were the final playoffs for promotion from 1999–2000 Segunda División B to the 2000–01 Segunda División. The four first placed teams in each of the four Segunda División B groups played the Playoffs de Ascenso and the four last placed teams in Segunda División were relegated to Segunda División B.

The teams play a league of four teams, divided into 4 groups. The champion of each group is promoted to Segunda División.

== Group A ==
=== League table ===
| Pos | Team | Pld | W | D | L | GF | GA | GD | Pts | Promotion or relegation |
|---|---|---|---|---|---|---|---|---|---|---|
| 1 | Universidad de Las Palmas (P) | 6 | 3 | 3 | 0 | 8 | 2 | +6 | 12 | Promotion to Segunda División |
| 2 | Xerez CD | 6 | 2 | 2 | 2 | 6 | 7 | −1 | 8 | |
| 3 | Real Zaragoza B | 6 | 2 | 1 | 3 | 4 | 8 | −4 | 7 | |
| 4 | Hércules | 6 | 1 | 2 | 3 | 7 | 8 | −1 | 5 | |

Source: arquero-arba
Rules for classification: 1st points; 2nd head-to-head points; 3rd head-to-head goal difference; 4th head-to-head goals scored; 5th goal difference; 6th number of goals scored
(P) Promoted

=== Results ===
| Home \ Away | ULP | XER | RZA | HÉR |
|---|---|---|---|---|
| Universidad de Las Palmas | | 2–0 | 3–0 | 1–1 |
| Xerez CD | 0–0 | | 0–0 | 2–1 |
| Real Zaragoza B | 0–1 | 3–1 | | 1–0 |
| Hércules | 1–1 | 1–3 | 3–0 | |

Source: arquero-arba
Legend: Blue = home team win; Yellow = draw; Red = away team win.

== Group B ==
=== League table ===
| Pos | Team | Pld | W | D | L | GF | GA | GD | Pts | Promotion or relegation |
|---|---|---|---|---|---|---|---|---|---|---|
| 1 | Real Jaén (P) | 6 | 2 | 3 | 1 | 8 | 6 | +2 | 9 | Promotion to Segunda División |
| 2 | Gimnástica de Torrelavega | 6 | 2 | 3 | 1 | 9 | 8 | +1 | 9 | |
| 3 | UDA Gramenet | 6 | 2 | 1 | 3 | 12 | 12 | 0 | 7 | |
| 4 | CD Ourense | 6 | 2 | 1 | 3 | 9 | 12 | −3 | 7 | |

Source: arquero-arba
Rules for classification: 1st points; 2nd head-to-head points; 3rd head-to-head goal difference; 4th head-to-head goals scored; 5th goal difference; 6th number of goals scored
(P) Promoted

=== Results ===
| Home \ Away | RJN | GTO | GRA | OUR |
|---|---|---|---|---|
| Real Jaén | | 1–1 | 3–0 | 0–2 |
| Gimnástica de Torrelavega | 1–1 | | 3–1 | 2–2 |
| UDA Gramenet | 2–2 | 2–0 | | 5–0 |
| CD Ourense | 0–1 | 1–2 | 4–2 | |

Source: arquero-arba
Legend: Blue = home team win; Yellow = draw; Red = away team win.

== Group C ==
=== League table ===
| Pos | Team | Pld | W | D | L | GF | GA | GD | Pts | Promotion or relegation |
|---|---|---|---|---|---|---|---|---|---|---|
| 1 | Racing Ferrol (P) | 6 | 3 | 1 | 2 | 11 | 8 | +3 | 10 | Promotion to Segunda División |
| 2 | Barakaldo CF | 6 | 3 | 0 | 3 | 6 | 6 | 0 | 9 | |
| 3 | AD Ceuta | 6 | 2 | 2 | 2 | 9 | 10 | −1 | 8 | |
| 4 | CF Gandía | 6 | 2 | 1 | 3 | 7 | 9 | −2 | 7 | |

Source: arquero-arba
Rules for classification: 1st points; 2nd head-to-head points; 3rd head-to-head goal difference; 4th head-to-head goals scored; 5th goal difference; 6th number of goals scored
(P) Promoted

=== Results ===
| Home \ Away | RFE | BAR | CEU | GAN |
|---|---|---|---|---|
| Racing Ferrol | | 2–0 | 2–2 | 3–0 |
| Barakaldo CF | 2–0 | | 2–1 | 2–1 |
| AD Ceuta | 3–2 | 1–0 | | 2–2 |
| CF Gandía | 1–2 | 1–0 | 2–0 | |

Source: arquero-arba
Legend: Blue = home team win; Yellow = draw; Red = away team win.

== Group D ==
=== League table ===
| Pos | Team | Pld | W | D | L | GF | GA | GD | Pts | Promotion or relegation |
|---|---|---|---|---|---|---|---|---|---|---|
| 1 | Real Murcia (P) | 6 | 4 | 0 | 2 | 8 | 6 | +2 | 12 | Promotion to Segunda División |
| 2 | Granada CF | 6 | 3 | 2 | 1 | 8 | 5 | +3 | 11 | |
| 3 | Burgos CF | 6 | 3 | 1 | 2 | 11 | 7 | +4 | 10 | |
| 4 | CD Mensajero | 6 | 0 | 1 | 5 | 3 | 12 | −9 | 1 | |

Source: arquero-arba
Rules for classification: 1st points; 2nd head-to-head points; 3rd head-to-head goal difference; 4th head-to-head goals scored; 5th goal difference; 6th number of goals scored
(P) Promoted

=== Results ===
| Home \ Away | RMU | GCF | BUR | MEN |
|---|---|---|---|---|
| Real Murcia | | 1–2 | 1–2 | 1–0 |
| Granada CF | 0–1 | | 2–1 | 2–0 |
| Burgos CF | 1–2 | 1–1 | | 3–1 |
| CD Mensajero | 1–2 | 1–1 | 0–3 | |

Source: arquero-arba
Legend: Blue = home team win; Yellow = draw; Red = away team win.
