= Guadix CF =

Guadix
- Full name: Guadix Club de Fútbol
- Nickname: Accitanos
- Founded: 1954; 1969 (refounded); 2005 (refounded)
- Ground: Municipal de Guadix; Guadix, Spain
- Capacity: 3,000
- President: Antonio Valverde
- Head coach: Jesús Sierra
- League: Primera Andaluza Granada
- 2024–25: Primera Andaluza Granada, 2nd of 16
Home colours	Away colours

Guadix Club de Fútbol is a Spanish football team based in Guadix, in the autonomous community of Andalusia. It plays in Primera Andaluza Granada, holding home matches at Estadio Municipal de Guadix, which holds a capacity of 3,000 people.

== History ==
Founded in 1954, after a previous Guadix CF was already dissolved in the city, the club initially only lasted six seasons active. In 1962, UD Accitana was founded, but folded two years later. In 1969, Club Amigos del Deporte was created, later adopting the name Guadix CF.

After years floating between the lower divisions, Guadix club came to national recognition during the 2000–01 Copa del Rey, after knocking out Valencia CF in the round of 32 on penalties; in the following round, however, it was eliminated by Granada CF also from the spot.

In 2005, Guadix sold his spot in the Tercera División to Granada Atlético CF, whilst at the same time AD Íllora (from Íllora) was named Guadix CD. In 2008, Guadix CD was renamed to the actual Guadix CF, inheriting the old club's history.

=== Club background ===
- Guadix Club de Fútbol - (1954–1960)
- Unión Deportiva Accitana - (1962–1964)
- Guadix Club de Fútbol - (1969–2005)
- Club Amigos del Deporte - (1969–1971)
- Guadix Club de Fútbol - (1971–2005)
- Granada Atlético Club de Fútbol - (2005–2009)
- Guadix Club de Fútbol - (1995–)
- Íllora Club Deportivo - (1995–2005)
- Guadix Club Deportivo - (2005–2008)
- Guadix Club de Fútbol - (2008–)

== Season to season ==
=== Guadix CF (1954) ===
Season	Tier	Division	Place	Copa del Rey
1954–55	5	2ª Reg.	4th	
1955–56	4	1ª Reg.	2nd	
1956–57	3	3ª	9th	
1957–58	3	3ª	6th	
1958–59	3	3ª	7th	
1959–60	3	3ª	14th	

- 4 seasons in Tercera División

=== Guadix CF (1969) ===
Season	Tier	Division	Place	Copa del Rey
1969–70	5	1ª Reg.	1st	
1970–71	5	1ª Reg.	8th	
1971–72	6	2ª Reg.	2nd	
1972–73	6	2ª Reg.	2nd	
1973–74	6	2ª Reg.	1st	
1974–75	6	2ª Reg.	3rd	
1975–76	5	1ª Reg.	16th	
1976–77	5	1ª Reg.	16th	
1977–78	6	1ª Reg.	14th	
1978–79	6	1ª Reg.	8th	
1979–80	6	1ª Reg.	7th	
1980–81	5	Reg. Pref.	8th	
1981–82	5	Reg. Pref.	6th	
1982–83	5	Reg. Pref.	12th	
1983–84	5	Reg. Pref.	9th	
1984–85	5	Reg. Pref.	13th	
1985–86	5	Reg. Pref.	15th	
1986–87	5	Reg. Pref.	1st	
1987–88	4	3ª	12th	

Season	Tier	Division	Place	Copa del Rey
1988–89	4	3ª	10th	
1989–90	4	3ª	8th	
1990–91	4	3ª	9th	
1991–92	4	3ª	15th	
1992–93	4	3ª	5th	
1993–94	4	3ª	4th	1st round
1994–95	4	3ª	8th	
1995–96	4	3ª	3rd	
1996–97	3	2ª B	15th	1st round
1997–98	3	2ª B	19th	
1998–99	4	3ª	3rd	
1999–2000	3	2ª B	7th	1st round
2000–01	3	2ª B	17th	Round of 16
2001–02	4	3ª	12th	
2002–03	4	3ª	7th	
2003–04	4	3ª	14th	
2004–05	4	3ª	8th	
2005–2009	as Granada Atlético CF			

- 4 seasons in Segunda División B
- 14 seasons in Tercera División

=== Guadix CF (1995) ===
Season	Tier	Division	Place	Copa del Rey
1995–96	7	2ª Reg.	2nd	
1996–97	6	1ª Reg.	11th	
1997–98	6	1ª Reg.	9th	
1998–99	6	1ª Reg.	2nd	
1999–2000	5	Reg. Pref.	15th	
2000–01	5	Reg. Pref.	9th	
2001–02	5	Reg. Pref.	4th	
2002–03	5	Reg. Pref.	4th	
2003–04	5	Reg. Pref.	4th	
2004–05	5	1ª And.	9th	
2005–06	5	1ª And.	10th	
2006–07	5	1ª And.	13th	
2007–08	6	Reg. Pref.	2nd	
2008–09	5	1ª And.	6th	
2009–10	5	1ª And.	3rd	
2010–11	5	1ª And.	5th	
2011–12	5	1ª And.	5th	
2012–13	5	1ª And.	3rd	
2013–14	5	1ª And.	2nd	
2014–15	4	3ª	9th	

Season	Tier	Division	Place	Copa del Rey
2015–16	4	3ª	7th	
2016–17	4	3ª	10th	
2017–18	4	3ª	19th	
2018–19	4	3ª	21st	
2019–20	5	Div. Hon.	18th	
2020–21	5	Div. Hon.	10th / 12th	
2021–22	7	1ª And.	2nd	
2022–23	7	1ª And.	8th	
2023–24	7	1ª And.	6th	
2024–25	7	1ª And.	2nd	
2025–26	7	1ª And.	1st	
2026–27	6	Div. Hon.		

- 5 seasons in Tercera División
