= Iñaki Dorronsoro =

Spanish industrial engineer (1947–2026)

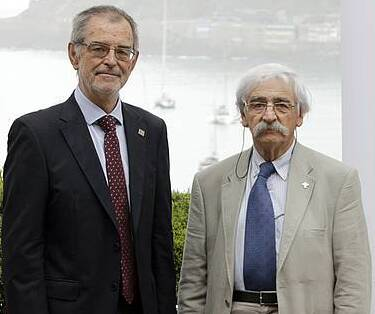
- Dorronsoro Plazaola (left) with Fermin Leizaola, 2017
- Born: 14 September 1947; Ataun, Gipuzkoa, Spain
- Died: 21 June 2026 (aged 78); Beasain, Gipuzkoa, Spain
- Education: Higher Technical School of Engineering; University of the Basque Country
- Occupation: Industrial engineer

Iñaki Dorronsoro Plazaola (14 September 1947 – 21 June 2026) was a Spanish industrial engineer. He served as president of the Basque Studies Society from 2013 to 2020, and as president of Gaindegia from 2022 to 2026.

Dorronsoro died in Beasain, Gipuzkoa, on 21 June 2026, at the age of 78.
