= Coria CF =

Association football club in Spain

Coria
- Full name: Coria Club de Fútbol
- Founded: 1923
- Ground: Estadio Guadalquivir, Coria del Río, Andalusia, Spain
- Capacity: 5,000
- President: (Spain) Manuel Romero Pacheco
- Head coach: (Spain) Juan Antonio Márquez Rojas "Cachola"
- League: División de Honor – Group 1
- 2025–26: Tercera Federación – Group 10, 18th of 18 (relegated)
Home colours	Away colours

Coria Club de Fútbol is a Spanish football team based in Coria del Río, in the autonomous community of Andalusia. Founded in 1923, it plays in División de Honor – Group 1, holding home matches at Estadio Guadalquivir with a capacity of 5,000 seats.

== History ==
In the 2017-18 season club managed to promote back to Tercera División after being relegated from it in 2017.

== Season to season ==
Season	Tier	Division	Place	Copa del Rey
1940–41	4	1ª Reg.	3rd	
1941–42	3	1ª Reg.	3rd	
1942–43	3	1ª Reg.	5th	
1943–44	3	3ª	4th	Second round
1944–45	3	3ª	3rd	
1945–46	3	3ª	7th	
1946–47	3	3ª	4th	
1947–48	3	3ª	12th	
1948–49	4	1ª Reg.	3rd	
1949–50	4	1ª Reg.	4th	
1950–51	4	1ª Reg.	2nd	
1951–52	4	1ª Reg.	5th	
1952–53	4	1ª Reg.	15th	
1953–54	4	1ª Reg.		
1954–55	4	1ª Reg.	1st	
1955–56	3	3ª	6th	
1956–57	3	3ª	2nd	
1957–58	3	3ª	3rd	
1958–59	3	3ª	16th	
1959–60	4	1ª Reg.	4th	

Season	Tier	Division	Place	Copa del Rey
1960–61	3	3ª	11th	
1961–62	3	3ª	13th	
1962–63	3	3ª	8th	
1963–64	3	3ª	13th	
1964–65	3	3ª	12th	
1965–66	3	3ª	12th	
1966–67	3	3ª	10th	
1967–68	3	3ª	12th	
1968–69	4	1ª Reg.	7th	
1969–70	4	1ª Reg.	6th	
1970–71	4	1ª Reg.	7th	
1971–72	4	1ª Reg.	11th	
1972–73	4	1ª Reg.	12th	
1973–74	4	1ª Reg.	10th	
1974–75	4	1ª Reg.	14th	
1975–76	5	1ª Reg.	1st	
1976–77	4	Reg. Pref.	16th	
1977–78	5	Reg. Pref.	8th	
1978–79	5	Reg. Pref.	13th	
1979–80	5	Reg. Pref.	3rd	

Season	Tier	Division	Place	Copa del Rey
1980–81	4	3ª	5th	
1981–82	4	3ª	5th	First round
1982–83	4	3ª	2nd	First round
1983–84	4	3ª	4th	Second round
1984–85	4	3ª	8th	First round
1985–86	4	3ª	2nd	
1986–87	4	3ª	8th	First round
1987–88	4	3ª	9th	
1988–89	4	3ª	4th	
1989–90	4	3ª	11th	
1990–91	4	3ª	13th	
1991–92	4	3ª	11th	
1992–93	4	3ª	7th	
1993–94	4	3ª	9th	
1994–95	4	3ª	13th	
1995–96	4	3ª	9th	
1996–97	4	3ª	10th	
1997–98	4	3ª	6th	
1998–99	4	3ª	3rd	
1999–2000	3	2ª B	15th	Second round

Season	Tier	Division	Place	Copa del Rey
2000–01	3	2ª B	6th	
2001–02	3	2ª B	20th	
2002–03	4	3ª	6th	
2003–04	4	3ª	7th	
2004–05	4	3ª	15th	
2005–06	4	3ª	19th	
2006–07	5	1ª And.	6th	
2007–08	5	1ª And.	2nd	
2008–09	4	3ª	6th	
2009–10	4	3ª	12th	
2010–11	4	3ª	12th	
2011–12	4	3ª	4th	
2012–13	4	3ª	3rd	
2013–14	4	3ª	12th	
2014–15	4	3ª	11th	
2015–16	4	3ª	17th	
2016–17	4	3ª	19th	
2017–18	5	Div. Hon.	2nd	
2018–19	4	3ª	13th	
2019–20	4	3ª	10th	

Season	Tier	Division	Place	Copa del Rey
2020–21	4	3ª	10th / 6th	
2021–22	6	Div. Hon.	1st	
2022–23	5	3ª Fed.	15th	
2023–24	5	3ª Fed.	15th	
2024–25	5	3ª Fed.	14th	
2025–26	5	3ª Fed.		

- 3 seasons in Segunda División B
- 52 seasons in Tercera División
- 4 seasons in Tercera Federación

== Former players ==
- (Spain) Juan Velasco
- (Spain) Mario Hidalgo
- (Spain) Francisco Lledó
- (Spain) Álvaro Cejudo
- (Spain) José Manuel Casado
- (Spain) Manuel Ruiz
- (Spain) Manuel Asián Bejarano

== Former coaches ==
- (Spain) Francisco López
- (Spain) Manuel Ruiz
- (Spain) Juan Carlos Álvarez
