= Xanin Dorronsoro =

Spanish-Basque footballer (1937–1960)

Juan Dorronsoro Landá (2 November 1937 – 9 August 1960), known popularly as Xanín, was a Spanish-Basque footballer who played as a forward for Real Betis.

== Career ==
Xanín began playing football with Basque side SD Eibar. He would also play for CE Sabadell FC, before making 14 La Liga appearances with Real Betis.

== Personal ==
Xanín died from leukemia at age 22.
