= CE Premià =

Spanish football club

Premià
- Full name: Club Esportiu Premià
- Founded: 1915
- Ground: Municipal, Premià de Mar, Catalonia, Spain
- Capacity: 1,500
- President: Walter Maiello
- Head coach: Christian Carriqui
- League: Primera Catalana – Group 1
- 2024–25: Segona Catalana – Group 2, 4th of 16 (promoted via play-offs)
Home colours	Away colours

Club Esportiu Premià is a Spanish football team based in Premià de Mar, in the autonomous community of Catalonia. Founded in 1915, it plays in Primera Catalana – Group 1, holding home matches at Estadio Municipal de Premià, with a capacity of 1,500 spectators.

== Season to season ==
Season	Tier	Division	Place	Copa del Rey
1940–41	7	2ª Reg.	1st	
1941–42	5	2ª Reg. P.	5th	
1942–43	5	2ª Reg.	5th	
1943–44	6	2ª Reg.	4th	
1944–45	7	2ª Reg.	2nd	
1945–46	6	2ª Reg. P.	3rd	
1946–47	7	4ª Reg.	7th	
1947–48	6	2ª Reg.	1st	
1948–49	6	2ª Reg.	2nd	
1949–50	6	2ª Reg.	7th	
1950–51	5	1ª Reg. B	3rd	
1951–52	5	1ª Reg. B	10th	
1952–53	5	1ª Reg. B	15th	
1953–54	5	2ª Reg.	9th	
1954–55	5	2ª Reg.	9th	
1955–56	5	2ª Reg.	13th	
1956–57	5	2ª Reg.	16th	
1957–58	5	2ª Reg.	2nd	
1958–59	5	2ª Reg.		
1959–60	4	1ª Reg.	8th	

Season	Tier	Division	Place	Copa del Rey
1960–61	4	1ª Reg.	10th	
1961–62	4	1ª Reg.	14th	
1962–63	4	1ª Reg.	15th	
1963–64	5	2ª Reg.	15th	
1964–65	5	2ª Reg.	7th	
1965–66	5	2ª Reg.	8th	
1966–67	5	2ª Reg.	14th	
1967–68	5	2ª Reg.	8th	
1968–69	6	2ª Reg.	2nd	
1969–70	6	2ª Reg.	2nd	
1970–71	6	2ª Reg.	2nd	
1971–72	6	2ª Reg.	2nd	
1972–73	6	2ª Reg.	2nd	
1973–74	5	1ª Reg.	11th	
1974–75	5	1ª Reg.	14th	
1975–76	5	1ª Reg.	9th	
1976–77	5	1ª Reg.	8th	
1977–78	6	1ª Reg.	16th	
1978–79	6	1ª Reg.	15th	
1979–80	6	1ª Reg.	16th	

Season	Tier	Division	Place	Copa del Rey
1980–81	6	1ª Reg.	4th	
1981–82	6	1ª Reg.	8th	
1982–83	6	1ª Reg.	14th	
1983–84	6	1ª Reg.	18th	
1984–85	7	2ª Reg.	10th	
1985–86	7	2ª Reg.	6th	
1986–87	7	2ª Reg.	5th	
1987–88	7	2ª Reg.	1st	
1988–89	6	1ª Reg.	1st	
1989–90	5	Reg. Pref.	2nd	
1990–91	5	Reg. Pref.	1st	
1991–92	4	3ª	4th	
1992–93	4	3ª	1st	First round
1993–94	3	2ª B	16th	Second round
1994–95	3	2ª B	20th	First round
1995–96	4	3ª	6th	
1996–97	4	3ª	8th	
1997–98	4	3ª	13th	
1998–99	4	3ª	2nd	
1999–2000	3	2ª B	12th	First round

Season	Tier	Division	Place	Copa del Rey
2000–01	3	2ª B	20th	
2001–02	4	3ª	15th	
2002–03	4	3ª	18th	
2003–04	5	1ª Cat.	10th	
2004–05	5	1ª Cat.	10th	
2005–06	5	1ª Cat.	3rd	
2006–07	4	3ª	16th	
2007–08	4	3ª	7th	
2008–09	4	3ª	6th	
2009–10	4	3ª	17th	
2010–11	4	3ª	20th	
2011–12	5	1ª Cat.	16th	
2012–13	6	2ª Cat.	8th	
2013–14	6	2ª Cat.	4th	
2014–15	6	2ª Cat.	2nd	
2015–16	6	2ª Cat.	3rd	
2016–17	6	2ª Cat.	6th	
2017–18	6	2ª Cat.	8th	
2018–19	6	2ª Cat.	7th	
2019–20	6	2ª Cat.	7th	

Season	Tier	Division	Place	Copa del Rey
2020–21	6	2ª Cat.	5th	
2021–22	7	2ª Cat.	3rd	
2022–23	7	2ª Cat.	10th	
2023–24	8	2ª Cat.	6th	
2024–25	8	2ª Cat.	4th	
2025–26	7	1ª Cat.		

- 4 seasons in Segunda División B
- 13 seasons in Tercera División

== Famous players ==
- (Romania) Claudiu Răducanu
- (Spain) Mariano Diaz Mejia
- (Spain) Aday Benitez
- (Spain) Enric Gallego
- (Senegal) Bambo Diaby
