= Pedro Dorronsoro =

Spanish footballer

Personal information
- Full name: Pedro José Dorronsoro González
- Date of birth: 19 May 1977 (age 49)
- Place of birth: Torrelavega, Spain
- Height: 1.80 m (5 ft 11 in)
- Position: Goalkeeper

Youth career
- Reocín

Senior career*
Years	Team	Apps	(Gls)
1996–1997	Reocín		
1997–2000	Gimnástica	39	(0)
2000–2001	Oviedo B	30	(0)
2001–2003	Oviedo	9	(0)
2003–2004	Barakaldo	34	(0)
2004–2005	Jerez	36	(0)
2005–2007	Logroñés	33	(0)
2007–2013	Melilla	185	(0)
2013–2014	Tropezón	17	(0)
Total		383	(0)

Managerial career
- 2014–2018: Tropezón (assistant)
- * Club domestic league appearances and goals

Pedro José Dorronsoro González (born 19 May 1977) is a Spanish retired footballer who played as a goalkeeper.

== Club career ==
Born in Torrelavega, Cantabria, Dorronsoro finished his youth career with local Reocín, and made his senior debut with the club in the Tercera División. In the summer of 1997, he first arrived in the Segunda División B, signing with Gimnástica.

In 2000, Dorronsoro joined Real Oviedo, being initially assigned to the reserves in the fourth level. On 25 May 2002, he appeared in his first match as a professional, starting in a 1–2 away loss against Xerez in the Segunda División.

Dorronsoro left the Asturians in 2003 and resumed his career in the third tier, representing Barakaldo, Jerez, Logroñés, Melilla and Tropezón. He retired with the latter side in June 2014 at the age of 37, being immediately appointed their assistant manager and goalkeeper coach. He left the position in June 2018, joining Racing Santander in the latter capacity shortly after.
