= Figueruelas =

- municipality
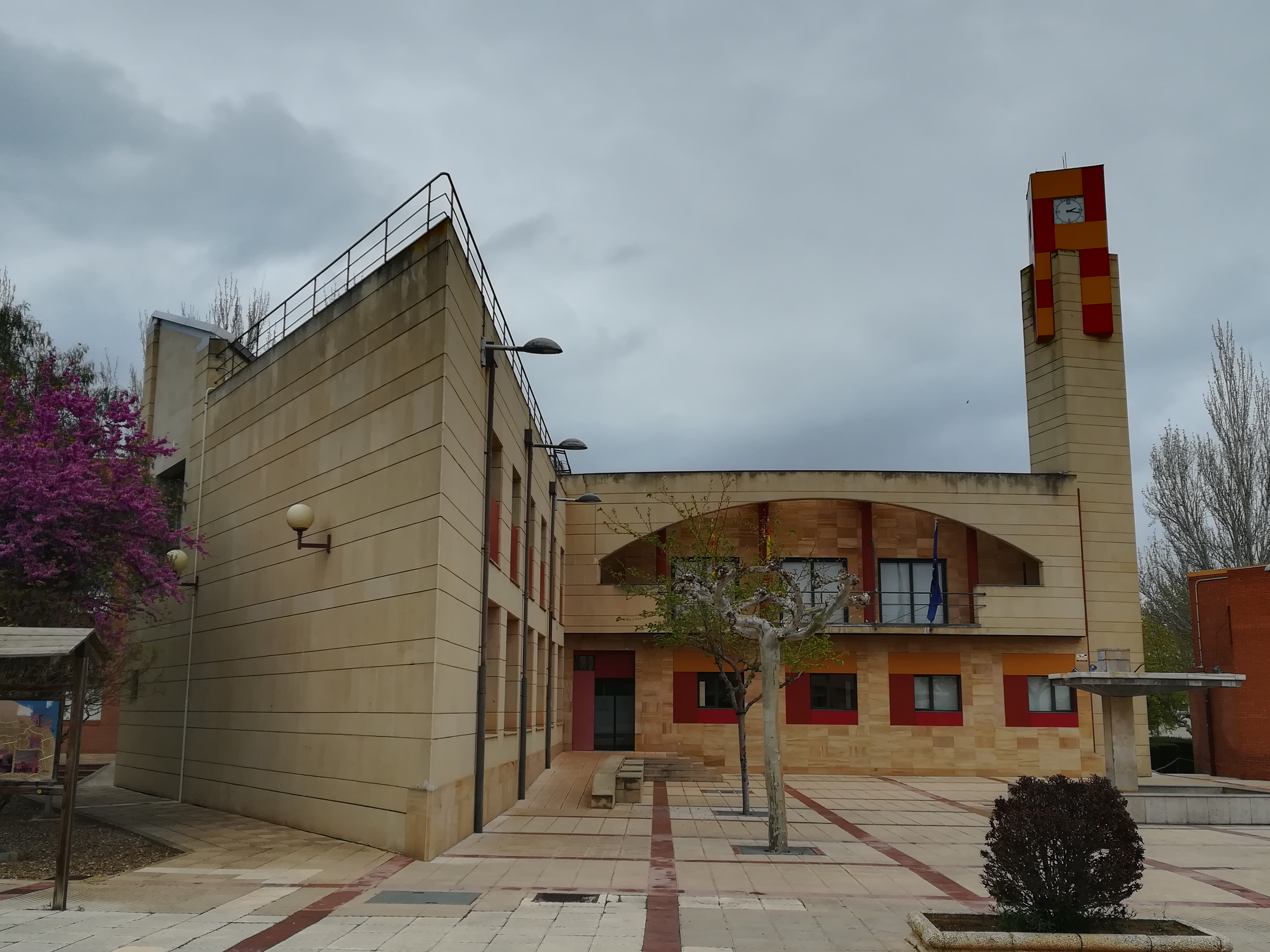

- Coat of arms

- Location within Aragon Location within Spain Location within Europe
- Country: Spain
- Autonomous community: Aragon
- Province: Zaragoza

Population (2025-01-01)
  - Total: 1,303
- Time zone: UTC+1 (CET)
  - Summer (DST): UTC+2 (CEST)

Figueruelas (population 1,040) is a small town and municipality in the Spanish Autonomous Region of Aragón, province of Zaragoza.

The town is home to car factory, opened in 1982 by General Motors and later sold to the PSA Group and currently Stellantis. It has built five generations of the Opel Corsa, as well as the Peugeot 208 among others.

== See also ==
- List of municipalities in Zaragoza
