= Sergi Segura =

Spanish footballer

Personal information
- Full name: Sergio Segura García
- Date of birth: 30 August 1995 (age 31)
- Place of birth: Villarreal, Spain
- Height: 1.80 m (5 ft 11 in)
- Position: Left back

Team information
- Current team: Guadalajara

Youth career
- Castellón

Senior career*
Years	Team	Apps	(Gls)
2014–2017	Leganés B	60	(5)
2016	Leganés	0	(0)
2017–2019	Navalcarnero	41	(1)
2019–2021	Pozuelo de Alarcón	45	(2)
2021–2024	Guadalajara	90	(6)
2024–2025	Merida	15	(0)
2025–2026	Sabadell	36	(0)
2026–	Guadalajara	0	(0)
- * Club domestic league appearances and goals as of 25 May 2026

Sergio "Sergi" Segura García (born 30 August 1995) is a Spanish footballer who plays as a left back for CD Guadalajara.

== Club career ==
Segura was born in Villarreal, Castellón, Valencian Community, and was a CD Castellón youth graduate. In 2014 he joined CD Leganés, being initially assigned to the reserves in the regional leagues.

Segura made his first-team debut on 29 November 2016, starting in a 1–3 home loss against Valencia CF for the season's Copa del Rey. He left the club in the following year, and moved to Segunda División B side CDA Navalcarnero.

In 2021, after two seasons at CF Pozuelo de Alarcón, Segura signed for Segunda División RFEF side CD Guadalajara. He agreed to a deal with Mérida AD of the Primera Federación on 15 June 2024, but returned to the fourth division the following 24 January, with CE Sabadell FC.

On 14 July 2026, after achieving two consecutive promotions with the Arquelinats, Segura returned to Guadalajara on a two-year contract.
