= Coria del Río =

- Municipality
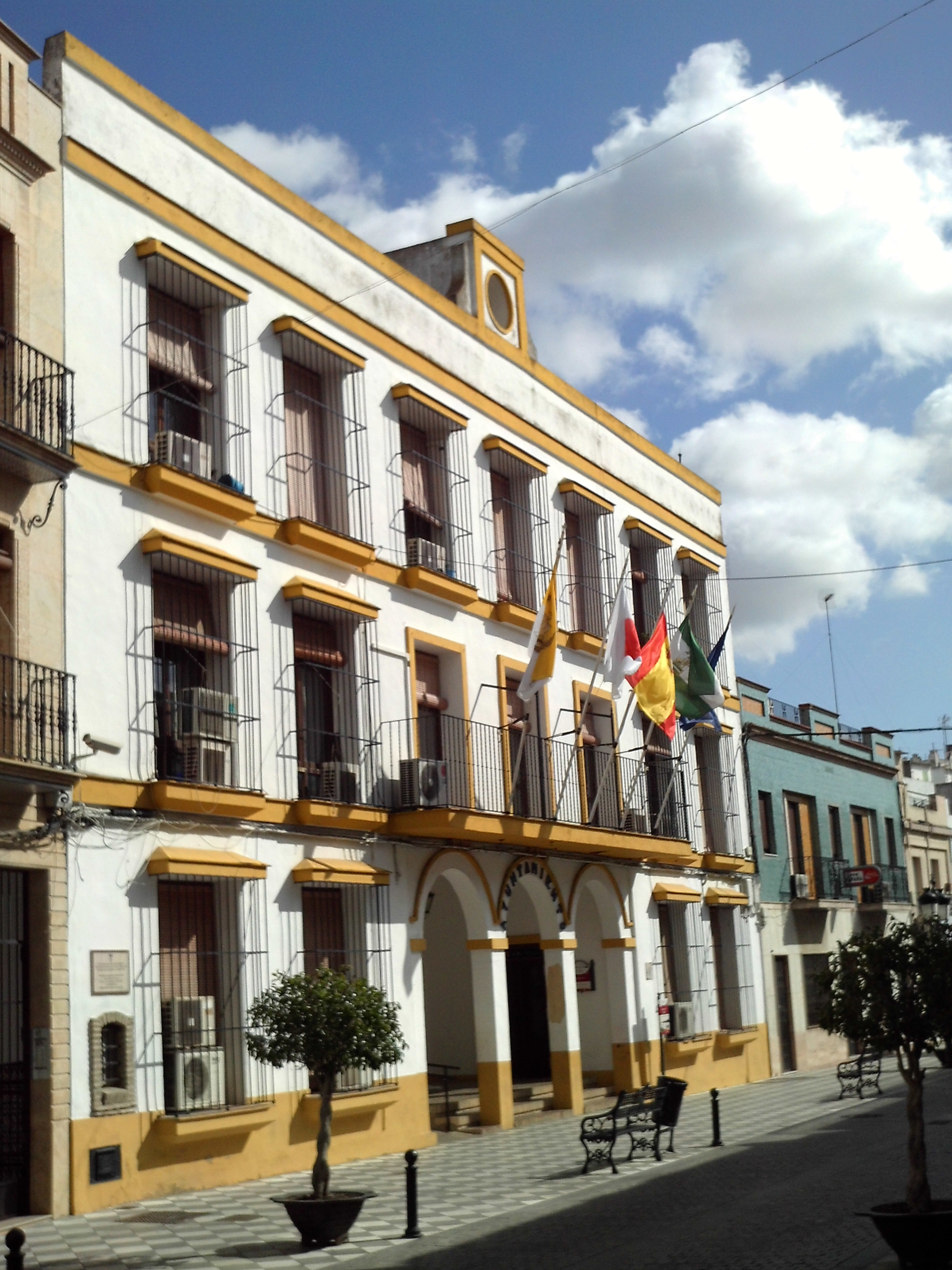
- Town hall

- Flag Coat of arms

- Location of Coria del Río in Spain
- Coordinates: 37°17′N 6°03′W
- Country: Spain
- Autonomous community: Andalusia
- Province: Seville

Government
  - Mayor: Modesto González (Andalucía por Sí)

Area
  - Total: 61.99 km^{2} (23.93 sq mi)
- Elevation: 5 m (16 ft)

Population (2025-01-01)
  - Total: 31,278
  - Density: 504.6/km^{2} (1,307/sq mi)
- Demonym(s): coriano (m), coriana (f)
- Postal code: 41100

Coria del Río is a town in Spain near Seville, on the shores of the Guadalquivir river.

== History ==
Early in the 17th century, daimyō Date Masamune of Sendai sent a delegation led by Hasekura Tsunenaga (1571–1622) to Europe. In 1613, Hasekura and the delegates visited the Spanish court of King Philip III and the Vatican. An embassy was established and six samurai stayed in Spain. Approximately 650 of Coria's 24,000 residents, as reported in 2003, use the surname Japón (originally Hasekura de Japón), identifying them as the descendants of the first Japanese official envoy to Spain. The name first appeared on an official document in 1646. Some babies born within the town are known to display the mongolian spot which is common in Asians.

A statue of Hasekura Tsunenaga was donated to the city by Japan in 1992 and stands watch over the river.

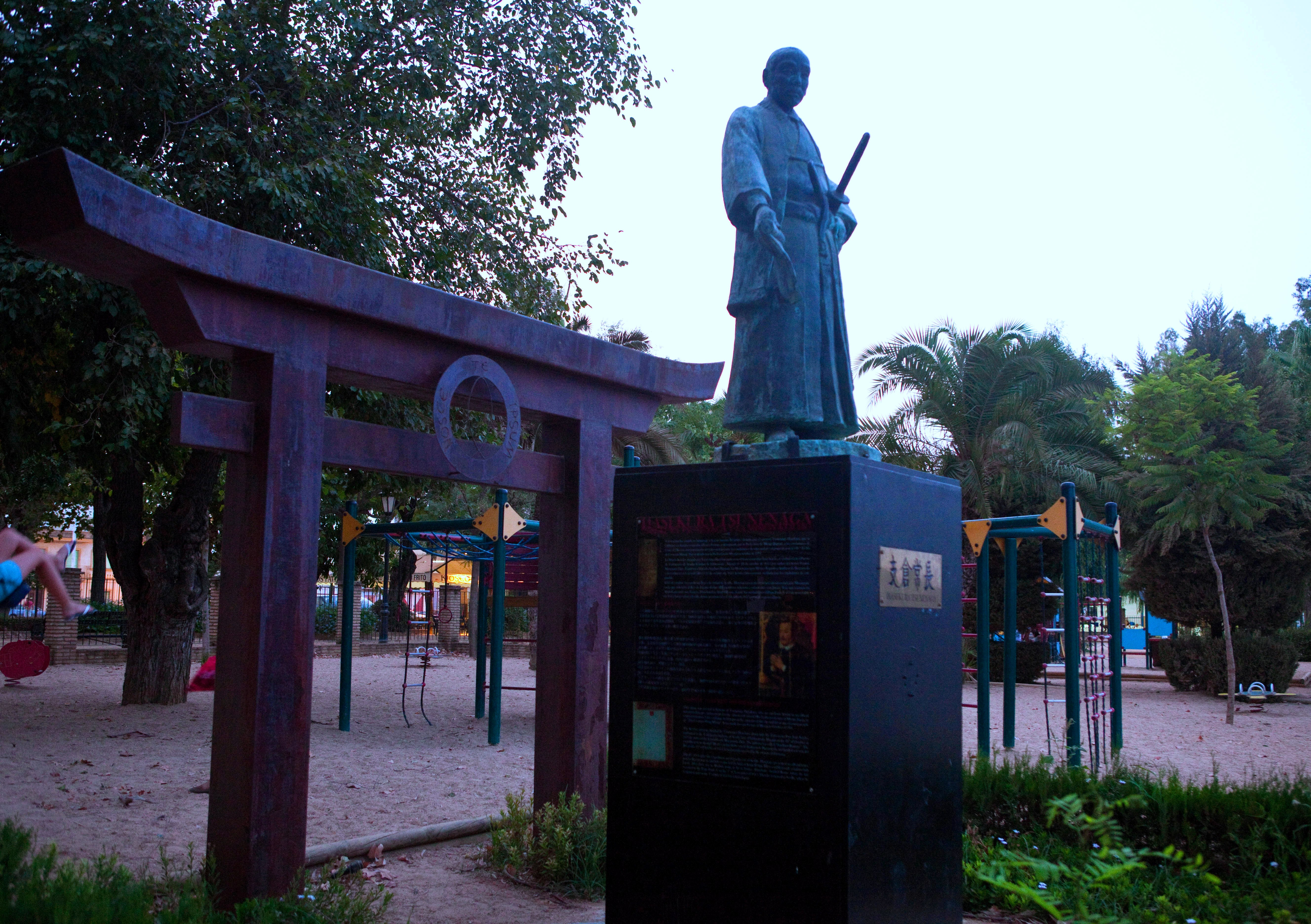
The torii gate and the Hasekura Tsunenaga statue in Coria del Rio

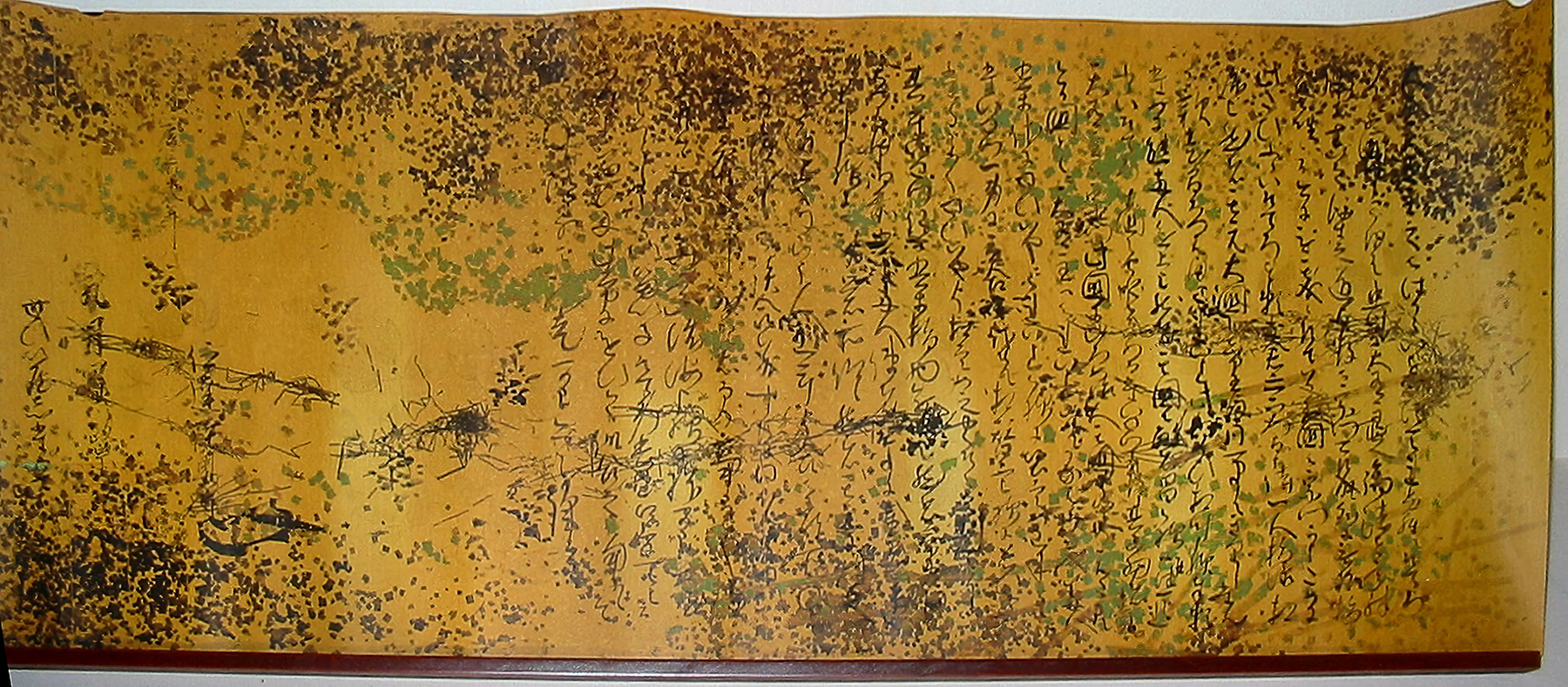
Historic letter from the first Japanese delegation to Spain

The football club Coria CF hails from Coria del Río. On April 4, 2025, a strong IF2 tornado struck the city, killing three workers as it collapsed a business.

== See also ==
- List of municipalities in Seville
